= Ramone Moore =

American basketball player

Personal information
- Born: May 27, 1989 (age 37) Philadelphia, Pennsylvania, U.S.
- Listed height: 6 ft 4 in (1.93 m)
- Listed weight: 190 lb (86 kg)

Career information
- High school: South Philadelphia (Philadelphia, Pennsylvania)
- College: Temple (2008–2012)
- NBA draft: 2012: undrafted
- Playing career: 2012–2021
- Position: Shooting guard

Career history
- 2012: Biella
- 2012: Hapoel Tel Aviv
- 2012–2013: Springfield Armor
- 2013–2014: Alba Fehérvár
- 2014–2015: Khimik
- 2015–2016: Pieno žvaigždės Pasvalys
- 2016–2017: Melbourne United
- 2017–2020: Adelaide 36ers
- 2019: Peristeri
- 2021: CSM Oradea

Career highlights
- NBL Best Sixth Man (2018); Ukrainian SuperLeague champion (2015); First-team All-Atlantic 10 (2012); Second-team All-Atlantic 10 (2011); Atlantic 10 Sixth Man of the Year (2010)

Ramone Edward Moore Jr. (born May 27, 1989) is an American former professional basketball player. He attended South Philadelphia High School, where he was coached by George Anderson. Moore led the Philadelphia Public League in scoring as a senior and earned Public League MVP honors. He enrolled at Temple as a non-scholarship student and redshirted his freshman year. As a redshirt sophomore, he was the Atlantic 10 Sixth Man of the Year. As a junior, he was an All-Atlantic 10 Second Team selection, and as a senior, he was an All-Atlantic 10 First Team selection.

== Early life ==
Moore was born on May 27, 1989, in Philadelphia, the son of Ramone Moore Sr. and Stephanie Pugh. The younger Moore spent his childhood on the basketball court, playing until nightfall to hone his skills. He attended South Philadelphia High School, the alma mater of basketball players Nate Blackwell and Lionel Simmons. He played on the school basketball team, the Rams, and was coached by George Anderson. As a junior, he was named All-Philadelphia Public League honorable mention.

In Moore's senior year, he led the Public League in scoring with 25.1 points per game and was named Public League Most Valuable Player. He finished his career at South Philadelphia High with 1,186 points. He was on the All-State Second Team and the Philadelphia Daily News named him to their All-City Team. In addition, Moore participated in the All-Star Labor Classic. Hoop Scoop named him the 166th best player in the Class of 2007. On January 9, 2007, Moore committed to Temple University over Nebraska. He said that he originally wanted to move out of the city, but Nebraska was simply too far. Ultimately, his relationship with Temple coach Fran Dunphy, who began recruiting Moore at a summer Amateur Athletic Union (AAU) event, proved to be the deciding factor. Moore said that he "not only know what kind of coach [Dunphy]'s going to be, but he's going to help turn me into a man."

== College career ==
=== Freshman year ===
To improve his academic profile, Moore planned to attend American Christian School in Aston, Pennsylvania, but a new NCAA rule was instituted that limited the number of core classes able to be taken at a prep school. Lacking the required number of credits to receive an athletic scholarship, he enrolled at Temple as a non-scholarship student and sat out his freshman year as a redshirt. In his freshman debut the following year, he scored 11 points against East Tennessee State. Moore followed that performance up with a double-double of 11 points and 10 rebounds versus the College of Charleston, and a season-high 13 points in a loss to Clemson. As a freshman, Moore averaged 4.5 points and 2.3 rebounds per game in 13.2 minutes of playing time. After his 13th game, he was suspended due to Temple eligibility rules and did not play in the remainder of the season.

=== Sophomore year ===
In his sophomore season, Moore played 34 games, starting five, and averaged 7.6 points and 3.0 rebounds per game. In the November 17 game against Georgetown, with Temple maintaining a one-point lead with 23 seconds left, Moore missed the front end of a one-and-one foul shot. Afterwards, Greg Monroe of Georgetown hit a layup to give the Hoyas a 46–45 victory. The following game against Siena, Moore was at the foul line with a one-point lead and, with 22 seconds left, hit both free throws to hand Temple a 73–69 victory. He increased his scoring average to 9.8 points per game in conference play, receiving more minutes due to a head injury to teammate Juan Fernandez. On February 20, 2010, he scored a season-high 24 points in an overtime victory over city rival Saint Joseph's, and made a critical fullcourt layup with 1.5 seconds left to send the game into overtime. Moore helped Temple to a 29–5 record and a third consecutive Atlantic 10 conference tournament title and an automatic bid to the NCAA tournament. He was named Atlantic 10 Sixth Man of the Year.

=== Junior year ===
Prior to his junior season, Moore participated in workouts in Houston with Houston Rocket and former Villanova Wildcat Kyle Lowry. The workouts focused on three point shooting, and Moore improved his percentages from 12.5 percent as a sophomore to 38.3 percent as a junior. His averages increased as well, to 15.2 points per game, a team high, and 4.2 rebounds per game, while also being the only Temple player to start all 34 games. On December 9, 2010, Moore scored a season-high 30 points in a 68–65 upset of Georgetown. He shot 12-for-18 in the game, which was coach Fran Dunphy's 400th career victory. During the season, Moore scored in double digits in 15 straight games.

Moore led Temple to a 26–8 record and a seven seed in the 2011 NCAA Men's Division I Basketball Tournament. He had 23 points as they defeated tenth-seeded Penn State in the Round of 64, 66–64. Moore finished with 17 points against San Diego State, but the Owls fell in double overtime. He was named to the All-Atlantic 10 Second Team at the conclusion of the regular season and was a Philadelphia Big Five First Team honoree. He was recognized as an All-Fourth District second-team selection by the National Association of Basketball Coaches making him eligible for the State Farm Division I All‐America teams. Since the Atlantic 10 Conference was its own district, this is equivalent to being named second team All-Atlantic 10 by the NABC. Moore considered entering the 2011 NBA draft to receive NBA evaluations, but decided not to fill out the paperwork.

=== Senior year ===
Moore was a Preseason All-Atlantic 10 First Team selection as a senior. He changed his jersey number from 23 to 10 in honor of his cousin Zaire, who died in a car crash in the summer of 2011 at the age of 10. He was named to the All-Atlantic 10 First Team at the conclusion of the regular season. He was recognized as an All-Fourth District first-team selection by the National Association of Basketball Coaches making him eligible for the State Farm Division I All-America teams. According to the Sporting News, Moore was the Player of the Year in the Atlantic 10.

== Professional career ==
After going undrafted in the 2012 NBA draft, Moore joined the Chicago Bulls for the 2012 NBA Summer League. On August 2, 2012, he signed with Angelico Biella of Italy for the 2012–13 season. He appeared in five games for Biella before leaving in November and joining Israeli club Hapoel Tel Aviv. He appeared in just one game for Hapoel before parting ways with the club on November 21.

On December 19, 2012, Moore was acquired by the Springfield Armor of the NBA Development League. In 37 games for the Armor in 2012–13, he averaged 9.2 points, 2.3 rebounds and 2.4 assists per game.

In September 2013, Moore signed with Alba Fehérvár of Hungary for the 2013–14 season. In 32 games for Alba, he averaged 16.3 points, 4.0 rebounds, 2.6 assists and 1.1 steals per game.

On August 10, 2014, Moore signed with Ukrainian club Khimik for the 2014–15 season. In 35 games for Khimik, he averaged 13.3 points, 4.1 rebounds, 5.2 assists and 1.7 steals per game, helping the team win the SuperLeague championship.

In September 2015, Moore signed with Pieno žvaigždės Pasvalys of Lithuania for the 2015–16 season. In 38 games for Pieno žvaigždės, he averaged 13.9 points, 3.7 rebounds, 2.7 assists and 1.3 steals per game.

On August 2, 2016, Moore signed with Melbourne United for the 2016–17 NBL season. On January 12, 2017, he was ruled out for the rest of the season with a calf injury. In 20 games for United, he averaged 10.1 points, 2.9 rebounds and 2.0 assists per game.

On March 13, 2017, Moore signed a two-week contract with Lithuanian club Lietkabelis Panevėžys. He left the team before playing in a game for them.

On August 7, 2017, Moore signed with the Adelaide 36ers for the 2017–18 NBL season. In 32 games, he averaged 11.6 points, 3.2 rebounds and 2.6 assists per game.

On May 24, 2018, Moore re-signed with the 36ers on a two-year deal. A left calf strain saw him sit out from mid-January to early February 2019. In 19 games for the 36ers in 2018–19, Moore averaged 9.2 points, 3.6 rebounds and 4.3 assists per game.

On February 22, 2019, Moore signed with Peristeri of the Greek Basket League. In eight games, he averaged 8.8 points, 3.1 rebounds and 3.0 assists per game.

Moore rejoined the 36ers in the 2019–20 NBL season. In January 2020, Moore was sidelined with a shoulder injury and subsequently ruled out for the final seven games of the 36ers' season. He averaged 7.8 points per game in 20 games.

== Career statistics ==
Legend
GP	Games played	GS	Games started	MPG	Minutes per game
FG%	Field goal percentage	3P%	3-point field goal percentage	FT%	Free throw percentage
RPG	Rebounds per game	APG	Assists per game	SPG	Steals per game
BPG	Blocks per game	PPG	Points per game	**Bold**	Career high

=== College ===
Year	Team	GP	GS	MPG	FG%	3P%	FT%	RPG	APG	SPG	BPG	PPG
2008–09	Temple	13	0	13.2	.393	.381	**.857**	2.3	.7	.3	.0	4.5
2009–10	Temple	**35**	5	18.0	**.479**	.125	.667	3.1	1.5	.4	.0	7.6
2010–11	Temple	34	**34**	33.9	.447	**.383**	.795	4.2	3.1	**1.2**	**.2**	15.2
2011–12	Temple	32	32	**36.6**	.426	**.383**	.763	**4.3**	**3.4**	1.1	**.2**	**17.3**
