= Matt Langel =

American basketball coach (born 1977)

Current position
- Title: Head coach
- Team: Colgate
- Conference: Patriot League
- Record: 261–222 (.540)

Biographical details
- Born: November 21, 1977 (age 49); Moorestown, New Jersey, U.S.

Playing career
- 1996–2000: Penn

Coaching career (HC unless noted)
- 2004–2006: Penn (assistant)
- 2006–2011: Temple (assistant)
- 2011–present: Colgate

Head coaching record
- Overall: 261–222 (.540)
- Tournaments: 0–5 (NCAA Division I); 0–1 (CBI)

Accomplishments and honors

Championships
- 5 Patriot League tournament (2019, 2021–2024); 5 Patriot League regular season (2019, 2020, 2022–2024); Patriot League North division (2021)

Awards
- First-team All-Ivy League (2000); 5× Patriot League Coach of the Year (2018–2020, 2023, 2024)

Matthew James Langel (born November 21, 1977) is an American college basketball coach who is currently the head coach for the Colgate Raiders men's basketball team. He previously served as an assistant for the Temple Owls men's basketball team for five seasons under Fran Dunphy.

== College career ==
From 1996 to 2000, Langel attended the University of Pennsylvania, where he starred on the Quaker basketball team under coach Fran Dunphy. As a freshman, he helped the 1996–97 team finish with a record of 12–15 and 8–6 in the Ivy League. In Langel's sophomore year, the 1997–98 Quaker team went 17–12 and 10–4 in the Ivy. The 1998–99 team reached the 1999 NCAA Division I men's basketball tournament after going 21–6 and 17–1 in conference.

He was honorary co-captain (along with Michael-Hakim Jordan) in his senior season in 1999–2000. He led the team to an undefeated (14–0) Ivy League season, a 21–8 record, and an NCAA tournament berth. On February 5, 2000, against Brown University, Langel knocked down eight three-point shots, two shy of the school record. He netted 70 3-pointers on the season, eighth in Penn history. After the season, Langel was selected to the All-Ivy League First Team. Langel finished his career at the University of Pennsylvania with 1,191 points. His 201 career 3-pointers ranks fourth in the Quaker record books, and 11th in Ivy League history.

== Professional career ==
The Atlantic City Seagulls of the United States Basketball League drafted Langel in the 2000 USBL Draft. He tried out for the Seattle SuperSonics in 2000, but did not make the squad. He began his professional career playing for Chene BC in Switzerland and ALM Evreux Basket in the France Pro A league. In 2001, Langel worked out in the Philadelphia 76ers summer camp before Mitteldeutscher BC and Phoenix Hagen in German Bundesliga I came calling. He ended his professional career with Eiffel Towers in the Netherlands.

== Coaching career ==
=== Penn ===
In November 2004, Langel joined the Penn coaching staff as an assistant to Fran Dunphy. Langel thought that his relative youth would provide a different perspective in coaching Quaker players. He helped the 2004–05 team go 20–9 and reach the 2005 NCAA Division I men's basketball tournament. The following season, Penn finished with an identical record and earned a berth to the 2006 NCAA Division I men's basketball tournament.

=== Temple ===
When Dunphy was hired at Temple University in 2006, he brought Langel along with him. In their first year at the helm, Dunphy and Langel guided Temple to a 12–18 finish, 6–10 in Atlantic 10 play. The following season, the 2007–08 team improved to 21–13 and 11–5 in conference and won the 2008 Atlantic 10 men's basketball tournament and its automatic bid to the NCAA tournament. Langel helped lead the 2008–09 team to a 22–12 mark (11–5 in the Atlantic 10) and won the 2009 Atlantic 10 men's basketball tournament to reach the NCAA tournament. The 2009–10 Owls went 29–6 and 14–2 in conference action, captured a third consecutive Atlantic 10 tournament title and reached the NCAA tournament. The 2010–11 team finished with a 29–6 record overall and 14–2 in the Atlantic 10 and defeated Penn State in the NCAA tournament round of 64 as Juan Fernandez hit an off balance shot with less than a second remaining to lift the Owls, 66–64.

Langel was responsible for recruiting Fernandez to Temple. On the recruiting trail in the summer of 2008, he took a plane ride down to Cordoba, Argentina, not far from Fernandez's home in Rio Tercero. When he landed there, he found out that Fernandez was practicing with the Argentine national team hundreds of miles away, and the taxi service would cost $1,000. With the next flight arriving the following morning, Langel rented a compact car and drove along a two-lane road for almost 10 hours. He made two more recruiting trips to Argentina before Fernandez signed his letter of intent. Langel convinced Fernandez to consult a sports psychologist when he was in the midst of a shooting slump in the 2010–11 season.

=== Colgate ===
On April 28, 2011, Langel was formally introduced as the new coach of the Colgate Raiders men's basketball team. He was chosen from a field of over 100 candidates to succeed Emmett Davis, who was fired after going 165–212 in 13 years. Langel inherits a team that finished 7–23 and 4–10 in the Patriot League. When he heard the news, Dunphy said: "I'm thrilled for Matt. Colgate gets a person with great character who is very wise and can be a mentor to all of his student-athletes." He hired Terrell Ivory, Michael McGarvey, and former Penn teammate David Klatsky as assistants.

On February 26, 2018 Langel was named the 2017–18 Patriot League Coach of the Year after leading the Raiders to a 12–6 conference record, finishing second in the league standings and representing a seven-game improvement over the prior year.

On March 4, 2019, Langel was named the 2018–2019 Patriot League Coach of the Year for the second consecutive year after leading the Raiders to a 13–5 conference record and capturing the regular season Patriot League championship.

He was named the 2019–20 Patriot League Coach of the Year for the third straight season after leading the team to a 13–3 conference record and regular season title.

In 2022, Langel was named as a training camp assistant for the USA Basketball men's U18 national team, under Colorado head coach Tad Boyle.

== Personal life ==
Langel was born and raised in Moorestown, New Jersey, where he attended Moorestown Friends School and then transferred to Moorestown High School, where he scored 1,497 points on the basketball team and graduated in 1996. At Penn, he was a member of the Friars Senior Society and the University Student-Athlete Advisory Committee and graduated from the Wharton School of Business in 2000. He is married to Tara Twomey Langel, who also played basketball at the University of Pennsylvania. The couple have a daughter, Logan Anne, and two sons, Lucas and Jackson.

== Head coaching record ==
Record table
| Season | Team | Overall | Conference | Standing | Postseason |
|---|---|---|---|---|---|
Colgate Raiders (Patriot League) (2011–present)
| 2011–12 | Colgate | 8–22 | 2–12 | 7th | |
| 2012–13 | Colgate | 11–21 | 5–9 | 5th | |
| 2013–14 | Colgate | 13–18 | 6–12 | 7th | |
| 2014–15 | Colgate | 16–17 | 12–6 | 2nd | |
| 2015–16 | Colgate | 13–17 | 9–9 | T–4th | |
| 2016–17 | Colgate | 10–22 | 8–10 | T–6th | |
| 2017–18 | Colgate | 19–14 | 12–6 | 2nd | CBI first round |
| 2018–19 | Colgate | 24–11 | 13–5 | T–1st | NCAA Division I Round of 64 |
| 2019–20 | Colgate | 25–9 | 14–4 | 1st | Postseason cancelled |
| 2020–21 | Colgate | 14–2 | 11–1 | 1st (North) | NCAA Division I Round of 64 |
| 2021–22 | Colgate | 23–12 | 16–2 | 1st | NCAA Division I Round of 64 |
| 2022–23 | Colgate | 26–9 | 17–1 | 1st | NCAA Division I Round of 64 |
| 2023–24 | Colgate | 25–10 | 16–2 | 1st | NCAA Division I Round of 64 |
| 2024–25 | Colgate | 14–19 | 10–8 | T–3rd | |
| 2025–26 | Colgate | 18–15 | 11–7 | T–2nd | |
| 2026–27 | Colgate | 2–4 | 0–0 | | |
| Colgate: | | 261–222 (.540) | 162–94 (.633) | | |
| Total: | | 261–222 (.540) | | | |
National champion Postseason invitational champion Conference regular season champion Conference regular season and conference tournament champion Division regular season champion Division regular season and conference tournament champion Conference tournament champion

== Bibliography ==
- Penn Quakers (2009). 2009–10 Men's Basketball Guide. University of Pennsylvania.
- Temple Owls (2010). 2010–11 Temple Men's Basketball Media Guide. Temple University.
