= 2009–10 Temple Owls men's basketball team =

American college basketball season

2009–10 Temple Owls men's basketball

A-10 Regular Season co-champions A-10 Tournament champions Philadelphia Big 5 champions

NCAA tournament, Round of 64
- Conference: Atlantic 10 Conference

Ranking
- AP: No. 12
- Record: 29–6 (14–2 A-10)
- Head coach: Fran Dunphy
- Assistant coaches: Dave Duke; Matt Langel; Shawn Trice
- Home arena: Liacouras Center

2009–10 Atlantic 10 men's basketball standings
	Conf.				Overall
Team	W		L	PCT	W		L	PCT
No. 12 Temple†	14	–	2	.875	29	–	6	.829
No. 25 Xavier	14	–	2	.875	26	–	9	.743
No. 24 Richmond	13	–	3	.813	26	–	9	.743
Saint Louis	11	–	5	.688	23	–	13	.639
Rhode Island	9	–	7	.563	26	–	10	.722
Charlotte	9	–	7	.563	19	–	12	.613
Dayton	8	–	8	.500	25	–	12	.676
St. Bonaventure	7	–	9	.438	15	–	16	.484
Duquesne	7	–	9	.438	16	–	16	.500
George Washington	6	–	10	.375	16	–	15	.516
UMass	5	–	11	.313	12	–	20	.375
Saint Joseph's	5	–	11	.313	11	–	20	.355
La Salle	4	–	12	.250	12	–	18	.400
Fordham	0	–	16	.000	2	–	26	.071
† 2010 Atlantic 10 Tournament winner Rankings from AP Poll

The 2009–10 Temple Owls men's basketball team represented Temple University in the 2009–10 NCAA Division I men's basketball season. They were led by head coach Fran Dunphy and played their home games at the Liacouras Center. The Owls are members of the Atlantic 10 Conference. They finished the season 29–6, 14–2 in A-10 play, to claim a share of the regular season championship. They won the 2010 Atlantic 10 men's basketball tournament for the third consecutive year, to receive the conference's automatic bid to the 2010 NCAA Division I men's basketball tournament. They received a 5 seed in the East Region, where they were upset in the first round by 12 seed Cornell.

== Preseason ==
The team was set to play their home games at Liacouras Center, which has a capacity of 10,206. They were in their 28th season as a member of the Atlantic 10 Conference. Coming back from their 2008–09 season, they compiled a record of 22–12 and won the Atlantic 10 men's basketball tournament for the second consecutive year.

However, Temple lost star player Dionte Christmas to graduation, whom Blue Ribbon Yearbook said that, if "anything good that happened to the Owls last year, Christmas had a hand in it." He led Temple in three statistics: points per game (19.5), three-pointers completed (107), and total steals (51); he finished second in two more: rebounds per game (5.5) and assists (28). In addition, he was an honorable mention All-American and scored 2,000 points over his college basketball career. Also graduating were two other starters: 7–0 center Sergio Olmos, who was selected as an All-A10 Tournament player, and point guard Semaj Inge.

Temple's schedule was announced on September 3, 2009, consisting of a school record-tying 31 games in the regular season. The out-of-conference portion, adopted on July 21, was regarded as one of the toughest in college hoops. Highlights included Georgetown and Siena, which began the season ranked; Virginia Tech, a competitor in the Atlantic Coast Conference; Penn State, who won the 2009 National Invitation Tournament; and Villanova and Kansas, two top 10 teams.

Due to these factors, Temple was picked to finish fifth in the conference by the Atlantic 10 Preseason Poll, tied with Duquesne. Lavoy Allen was the only team member selected on the Preseason All-Atlantic 10 First Team. The Blue Ribbon Yearbook gave the backcourt a grade of B, the frontcourt a B, the bench/depth a C+, and the intangibles a B+. They commented that "the Owls have had a way the last couple years of surprising people," and that while Temple "might still surprise some people, but don't expect it to be with an NCAA Tournament berth."

=== Recruiting ===
==== Incoming signees ====
College recruiting
Name	Hometown	School	Height	Weight	Commit date
Rahlir Jefferson; SF	Chester, Pennsylvania	Chester (PA)	6 ft 5.5 in (1.97 m)	192.5 lb (87.3 kg)	Sep 19, 2008
Rahlir Jefferson; SF	Recruit ratings: Scout: Rivals: (85)				
Khalif Wyatt; SG	Norristown, Pennsylvania	Norristown (PA)	6 ft 3 in (1.91 m)	200 lb (91 kg)	Aug 18, 2008
Khalif Wyatt; SG	Recruit ratings: Scout: Rivals: (84)				
Overall recruit ranking:
Note: In many cases, Scout, Rivals, 247Sports, On3, and ESPN may conflict in their listings of height and weight.; In these cases, the average was taken. ESPN grades are on a 100-point scale.; Sources: "Temple 2009 Basketball Commitments". Rivals.; "2009 Temple Basketball Commits". Scout.; "ESPN". ESPN.; "Scout.com Team Recruiting Rankings". Scout.; "2009 Team Ranking". Rivals.

==== 2010–11 team recruits ====
College recruiting
Name	Hometown	School	Height	Weight	Commit date
Anthony Lee; F/C	Orlando, Florida	Eustis HS (FL)	6 ft 9 in (2.06 m)	195 lb (88 kg)	Sep 26, 2009
Anthony Lee; F/C	Recruit ratings: Scout: Rivals: (88)				
Aaron Brown; SF	Newark, New Jersey	St. Benedict's Prep (NJ)	6 ft 3 in (1.91 m)	185 lb (84 kg)	Nov 2, 2009
Aaron Brown; SF	Recruit ratings: Scout: Rivals: (83)				
Jimmy McDonnell; PF	Jackson, New Jersey	Jackson Memorial HS (NJ)	6 ft 10 in (2.08 m)	190 lb (86 kg)	Aug 8, 2010
Jimmy McDonnell; PF	Recruit ratings: (40)				
Overall recruit ranking:
Note: In many cases, Scout, Rivals, 247Sports, On3, and ESPN may conflict in their listings of height and weight.; In these cases, the average was taken. ESPN grades are on a 100-point scale.; Sources: "Temple 2010 Basketball Commitments". Rivals.; "2010 Temple Basketball Commits". Scout.; "ESPN". ESPN.; "Scout.com Team Recruiting Rankings". Scout.; "2010 Team Ranking". Rivals.

== Roster ==
=== Players ===
#	Name	Height	Weight (lbs.)	Position	Class	Hometown		High school
1	Khalif Wyatt	6 ft 4 in (1.93 m)	210 pounds (95 kg)	G	Fr.	Norristown, Pennsylvania	U.S.	Norristown HS
2	Ryan Brooks	6 ft 4 in (1.93 m)	200 pounds (91 kg)	G	Sr.	Narberth, Pennsylvania	U.S.	Lower Merion HS
4	Juan Fernandez	6 ft 4 in (1.93 m)	180 pounds (82 kg)	G	So.	Río Tercero, Córdoba	Argentina	Dr. Alexis Carrel HS
10	Luis Guzman	6 ft 3 in (1.91 m)	200 pounds (91 kg)	G	Sr.	New York City	U.S.	Paramus Catholic HS
11	T. J. DiLeo	6 ft 2 in (1.88 m)	195 pounds (88 kg)	G	Fr.	Cinnaminson, New Jersey	U.S.	Cinnaminson HS
15	Carmel Bouchman	6 ft 8 in (2.03 m)	215 pounds (98 kg)	F	Fr.	Tel Aviv	Israel	Irani Tet HS
21	Rafael DeLeon	6 ft 5 in (1.96 m)	200 pounds (91 kg)	F	Sr.	District Heights, Maryland	U.S.	Bishop McNamara HS
23	Ramone Moore	6 ft 4 in (1.93 m)	180 pounds (82 kg)	G	So.	Philadelphia, Pennsylvania	U.S.	South Philadelphia HS
24	Lavoy Allen	6 ft 9 in (2.06 m)	225 pounds (102 kg)	F	Jr.	Morrisville, Pennsylvania	U.S.	Pennsbury HS
30	Craig Williams	6 ft 9 in (2.06 m)	240 pounds (110 kg)	F	Jr.	Christiansted, U.S. Virgin Islands	U.S.	St. Croix Central HS
31	Jake Godino	6 ft 0 in (1.83 m)	170 pounds (77 kg)	G	So.	Chester, Pennsylvania	U.S.	Delaware County Christian School
32	Rahlir Jefferson	6 ft 6 in (1.98 m)	200 pounds (91 kg)	F	Fr.	Chester, Pennsylvania	U.S.	Chester HS
33	Scootie Randall	6 ft 6 in (1.98 m)	205 pounds (93 kg)	F	So.	Philadelphia, Pennsylvania	U.S.	Communications Tech HS
45	Chris Clarke	6 ft 8 in (2.03 m)	200 pounds (91 kg)	F	So.	Orchard Lake, Michigan	U.S.	St. Mary's Prep
50	Micheal Eric	6 ft 11 in (2.11 m)	240 pounds (110 kg)	F/C	So.	Lagos	Nigeria	Church Farm School

=== Coaches ===
Name	Position	Year at Temple	Alma mater (year)
Fran Dunphy	Head coach	4th	La Salle (1970)
Dave Duke	Assistant coach	4th	Villanova (1974)
Matt Langel	Assistant coach	4th	Pennsylvania (2000)
Shawn Trice	Assistant coach	4th	Pennsylvania (1995)
Jeff Wilson	Director of operations	4th	Temple (2004)
Steve Spirro	Athletic trainer	6th	Temple (2002)
Dion Dacons	Coordinator of student development/manager	2nd	Temple (2007)

== Schedule ==
2009–10 game log
November

Game	Date	Team	Score	High points	High rebounds	High assists	Location Attendance	Record
1	November 14	Delaware	W 76–56	Ryan Brooks – 23	Lavoy Allen – 15	Juan Fernandez – 5	Bob Carpenter Center, Newark, DE (3,080)	1–0
2	November 17	Georgetown (#19)	L 46–45	Allen – 12	Allen – 14	Luiz Guzman – 6	Verizon Center, Washington, DC (8,712)	1–1
3	November 21	Siena	W 73–69	Fernandez – 20	Allen – 7	Allen – 5	Liacouras Center, Philadelphia, PA (6,759)	2–1
4	November 24	Ball State	W 66–46	Brooks – 17	Allen – 9	Allen/Brooks – 7	Liacouras Center, Philadelphia, PA (3,597)	3–1
5	November 27	Virginia Tech	W 61–50	Allen – 18	Allen – 10	Fernandez – 6	Palestra, Philadelphia, PA (3,750)	4–1
6	November 28	St. John's	L 55–48	Ramone Moore – 10	Rahlir Jefferson – 12	Fernandez – 4	Palestra, Philadelphia, PA (3,469)	4–2

December

Game	Date	Team	Score	High points	High rebounds	High assists	Location Attendance	Record
7	December 1	Western Michigan	W 76–70	Brooks – 17	Brooks – 10	Guzman – 6	University Arena in Read Fieldhouse, Kalamazoo, MI (3,086)	5–2
8	December 5	Penn State	W 45–42	Brooks – 19	Allen – 12	Fernandez – 4	Liacouras Center, Philadelphia, PA (7,012)	6–2
9	December 8	Miami (OH)	W 64–42	Allen – 15	Allen – 7	Allen/Fernandez – 4	John D. Millett Hall, Miami, OH (1,457)	7–2
10	December 13	Villanova (#3)	W 75–65	Fernandez – 33	Allen – 17	Guzman – 7	Liacouras Center, Philadelphia, PA (8,449)	8–2
11	December 19	Seton Hall	W 71–65	Brooks – 24	Allen – 12	Brooks – 3	Prudential Center, Newark, NJ (7,100)	9–2
12	December 28	Bowling Green	W 63–39	Brooks – 19	Allen – 13	Brooks – 6	Liacouras Center, Philadelphia, PA (3,900)	10–2
13	December 30	Northern Illinois	W 70–60	Fernandez – 26	Allen – 11	Brooks – 4	Convocation Center, DeKalb, IL (1,234)	11–2

January

Game	Date	Team	Score	High points	High rebounds	High assists	Location Attendance	Record
14	January 2	Kansas (#1)	L 84–52	Brooks/Fernandez – 11	Guzman – 6	Allen/Brooks/Fernandez/Guzman – 2	Liacouras Center, Philadelphia, PA (10,206)	11–3
15	January 6	St. Joseph's	W 73–46	Allen – 20	Allen – 11	Craig Williams/Guzman/Moore – 3	Liacouras Center, Philadelphia, PA (6,103)	12–3 (1–0)
16	January 10	Rhode Island (#32)	W 68–64 (OT)	Fernandez – 18	Allen – 12	Fernandez – 4	Thomas M. Ryan Center, Kingston, RI (6,122)	13–3 (2–0)
17	January 13	Pennsylvania	W 60–45	Brooks – 15	Allen/Guzman – 6	Brooks/Fernandez – 3	Palestra, Philadelphia, Pennsylvania (6,353)	14–3
18	January 16	Massachusetts	W 76–64	Brooks – 29	Allen – 14	Guzman – 7	Liacouras Center, Philadelphia, PA (4,263)	15–3 (3–0)
19	January 20	Xavier	W 77–72	Brooks – 22	Allen/Brooks – 7	Fernandez – 7	Liacouras Center, Philadelphia, PA (6,813)	16–3 (4–0)
20	January 23	Fordham	W 62–45	Fernandez – 13	Micheal Eric – 5	Brooks – 6	Rose Hill Gym, New York, NY (2,690)	17–3 (5–0)
21	January 27	Charlotte	L 74–64	Brooks – 20	Allen – 14	Fernandez – 6	Dale F. Halton Arena, Charlotte, NC (7,623)	17–4 (5–1)
22	January 30	La Salle	W 64–52	Moore – 14	Allen – 10	Allen/Guzman – 5	Liacouras Center, Philadelphia, PA (8,501)	18–4 (6–1)

February

Game	Date	Team	Score	High points	High rebounds	High assists	Location Attendance	Record
23	February 3	Duquesne	W 76–60	Moore – 15	Allen – 15	Guzman – 4	Liacouras Center, Philadelphia, PA (4,391)	19–4 (7–1)
24	February 6	Richmond	L 71–54	Allen/Moore – 17	Allen – 19	Guzman – 3	Robins Center, Richmond, VA (6,806)	19–5 (7–2)
25	February 13	Rhode Island	W 78–56	Eric – 19	Allen/Guzman – 7	Fernandez – 6	Liacouras Center, Philadelphia, PA (7,080)	20–5 (8–2)
26	February 17	St. Bonaventure	W 73–55	Moore – 18	Allen – 6	Fernandez – 5	Reilly Center, St. Bonaventure, NY (4,522)	21–5 (9–2)
27	February 20	St. Joseph's	W 75–67 (OT)	Moore – 24	Allen – 10	Guzman – 4	Hagan Arena, Philadelphia, PA (8,151)	22–5 (10–2)
28	February 24	Dayton	W 49–41	Moore – 13	Allen – 17	Guzman – 7	Liacouras Center, Philadelphia, PA (5,833)	23–5 (11–2)
29	February 28	La Salle	W 68–53	Fernandez – 23	Allen – 21	Guzman – 7	Tom Gola Arena, Philadelphia, PA (4,000)	24–5 (12–2)

March

Game	Date	Team	Score	High points	High rebounds	High assists	Location Attendance	Record
30	March 3	St. Louis	W 57–51	Allen – 18	Allen – 14	Guzman – 4	Chaifetz Arena, St. Louis, MO (7,984)	25–5 (13–2)
31	March 6	George Washington	W 70–57	Eric – 18	Eric – 6	Fernandez – 5	Liacouras Center, Philadelphia, PA (6,356)	26–5 (14–2)
32	March 12	St. Bonaventure	W 69–51	Fernandez – 17	Allen – 15	Fernandez – 7	Boardwalk Hall, Atlantic City, NJ; A-10 tournament quarterfinals	27–5
33	March 13	Rhode Island	W 57–44	Brooks – 16	Allen – 10	Fernandez – 6	Boardwalk Hall, Atlantic City, NJ; A-10 Tournament semifinals	28–5
34	March 14	Richmond	W 56–52	Fernandez – 18	Allen – 11	Allen – 3	Boardwalk Hall, Atlantic City, NJ; A-10 Tournament finals (7,882)	29–5
35	March 19	Cornell (12 Seed)	L 65–78	Fernandez/Brooks – 14	Allen – 5	Allen – 4	Jacksonville Veterans Memorial Arena, Jacksonville, FL; NCAA tournament First round (10,657)	29–6

2015–16 season schedule

== Season ==
=== Preconference season ===
The Owls kicked off their season on November 14, 2009 with a 76–56 win against the University of Delaware, sending the Fighting Blue Hens to their fourth straight loss as a home opener. On November 17, the Owls failed to capitalize on preseason No. 19 Georgetown Hoyas' sloppy play, as the Hoyas were victorious 45–46. The game featured more fouls (18) and turnovers (16) than completed baskets (15) for Georgetown, playing their home opener at the Verizon Center. Georgetown led 19–13 at halftime, but Temple managed to mount a comeback, as they led with 6 seconds left in regulation until Hoya Greg Monroe scored the winning 3-pointer. After the game, Temple's 68-game winning streak when opponents scored less than 50 points was crushed.

On November 21, Temple beat the Siena Saints, after overcoming a six-point deficit at the half to end the game at 73–69. As a result, the Owls began receiving votes in the 2008-09 NCAA Division I men's basketball rankings for the week of November 23. After an easy win against Ball State on November 24, the Owls next faced Virginia Tech in the semifinals of the Philly Hoop Group Classic. Temple overcame Malcolm Delaney's 32 points to defeat the Hokies 60–51 on November 27. Their 4–1 start was the Owls' best since 2000.

The team suffered their second loss of the season by the undefeated Red Storm of St. John's on November 28, in the championship game of the Philly Hoop Group Classic. Temple led 22–21 at the half, but the Red Storm went on a 14–2 run in the beginning of the second half from which the Owls could not recover, and St. John's won 55–48. This caused Temple to lose all support in the national rankings. The Owls rebounded with three consecutive wins: against Western Michigan, Penn State, and Miami (Ohio). The Penn State game was notable in that it was the second lowest scoring game in the 13-year history of the Liacouras Center. Ryan Brooks's 19 points, the only Owl scoring in double figures, helped lead Temple over the Nittany Lions 45–42 in the largely defensive matchup.

Temple entered the top 25 in national rankings for the first time since 2001.

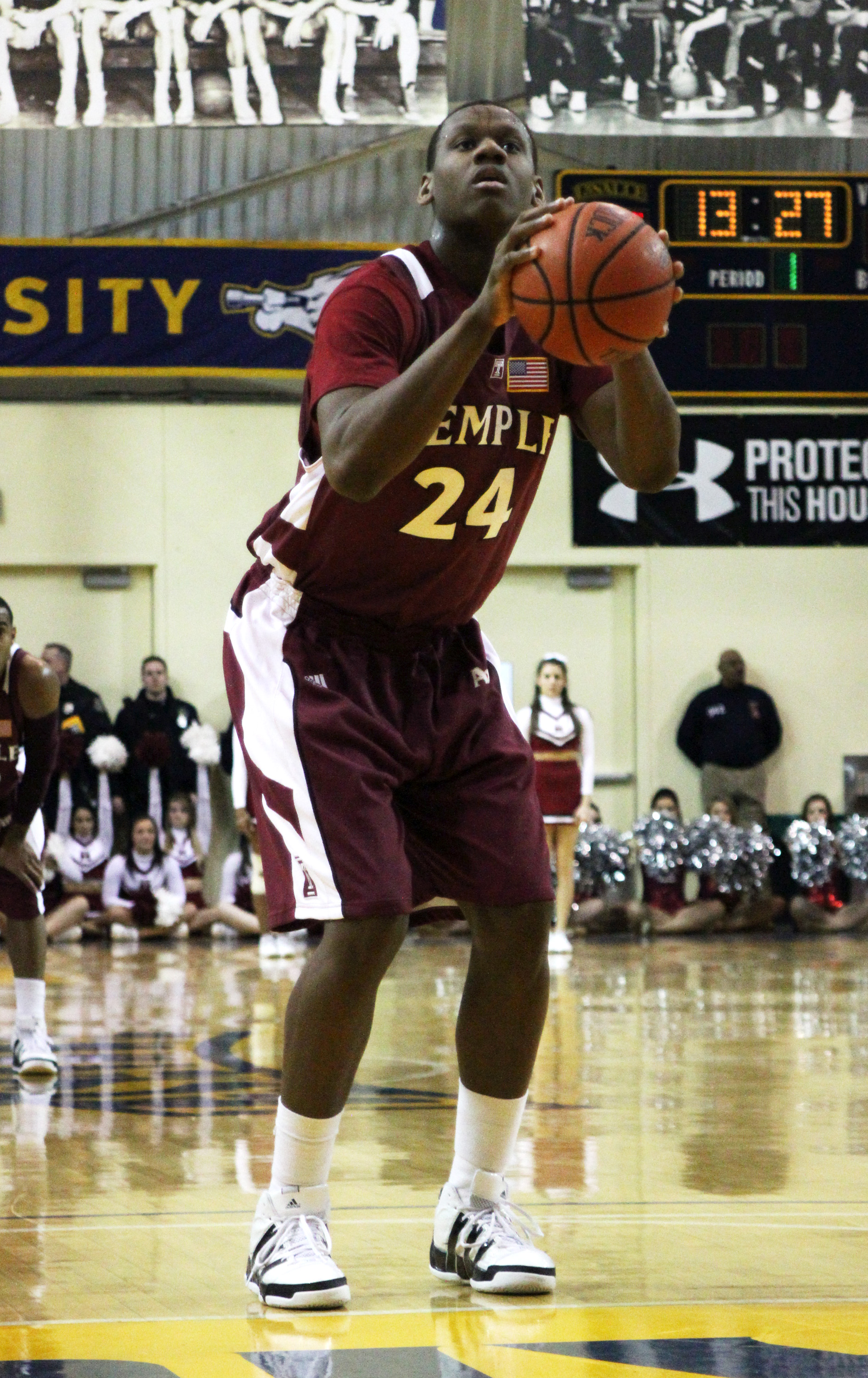
Lavoy Allen shooting a free throw against La Salle on February 28, 2010

== Rankings ==
Ranking movement Legend: ██ Increase in ranking. ██ Decrease in ranking.
Poll	Pre	Wk 1	Wk 2	Wk 3	Wk 4	Wk 5	Wk 6	Wk 7	Wk 8	Wk 9	Wk 10	Wk 11	Wk 12	Wk 13	Wk 14	Wk 15	Wk 16	Wk 17	Wk 18	Final
AP			47			30	21	18	21	19	16	15	19	21	21	20	20	17	12	
Coaches						30	25	19	25	21	17	15	17	21	20	18	16	17	13	27
ESPN.com Power Rankings	N/A	N/A	N/A	N/A	N/A	N/A	N/A	N/A	N/A	23	18	16	18	19	21	20	16	19	N/A	

== Awards & honors ==
Lavoy Allen

- Preseason All-Atlantic 10 First Team
- November 30, 2009 Philadelphia Big Five Player of the Week
- November 30, 2009 Temple University Athlete of the Week
- December 14, 2009 Philadelphia Big Five Honor Roll
- January 11, 2010 Philadelphia Big Five Player of the Week
- January 11, 2010 Temple University Athlete of the Week

Ryan Brooks

- November 16, 2009 Philadelphia Big Five Honor Roll
- December 7, 2009 Philadelphia Big Five Honor Roll
- December 21, 2009 Philadelphia Big Five Player of the Week
- December 21, 2009 Temple University Athlete of the Week
- January 4, 2010 Philadelphia Big Five Honor Roll

Juan Fernandez

- December 14, 2009 Philadelphia Big Five Player of the Week
- December 14, 2009 Temple University Athlete of the Week
- December 20, 2009 A-10 Player of the Week
- January 6, 2010 Temple University Athlete of the Month
