= 2009–10 Charlotte 49ers men's basketball team =

American college basketball season

2009–10 Charlotte 49ers men's basketball
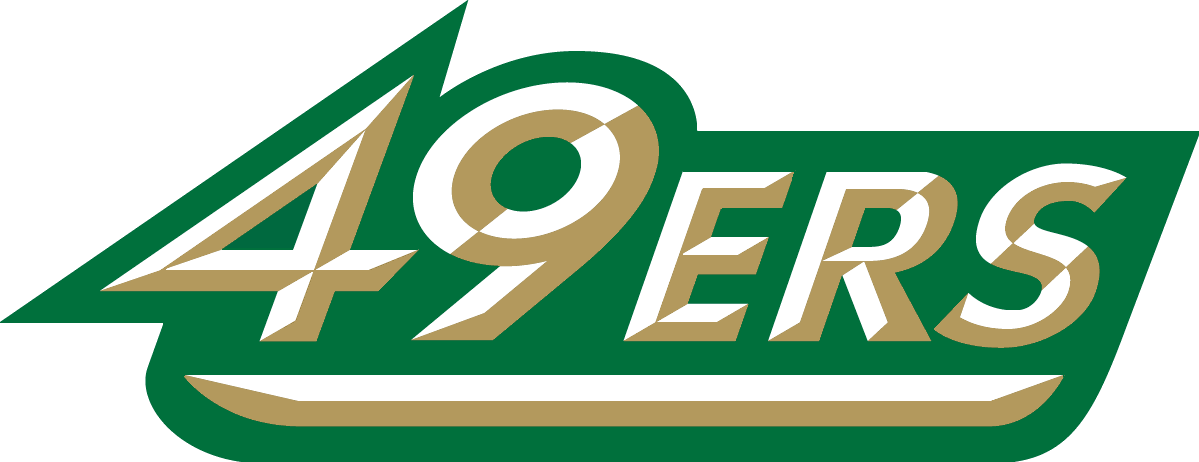
- Conference: Atlantic 10 Conference
- Record: 19–12 (9–7 A-10)
- Head coach: Bobby Lutz
- Assistant coaches: Rob Moxley; Chris Cheeks; Bobby Kummer
- Home arena: Dale F. Halton Arena

2009–10 Atlantic 10 men's basketball standings
| | Conf. | | | | Overall |
| Team | W | | L | PCT | W | | L | PCT |
|---|---|---|---|---|---|---|---|---|
| No. 12 Temple† | 14 | – | 2 | .875 | 29 | – | 6 | .829 |
| No. 25 Xavier | 14 | – | 2 | .875 | 26 | – | 9 | .743 |
| No. 24 Richmond | 13 | – | 3 | .813 | 26 | – | 9 | .743 |
| Saint Louis | 11 | – | 5 | .688 | 23 | – | 13 | .639 |
| Rhode Island | 9 | – | 7 | .563 | 26 | – | 10 | .722 |
| Charlotte | 9 | – | 7 | .563 | 19 | – | 12 | .613 |
| Dayton | 8 | – | 8 | .500 | 25 | – | 12 | .676 |
| St. Bonaventure | 7 | – | 9 | .438 | 15 | – | 16 | .484 |
| Duquesne | 7 | – | 9 | .438 | 16 | – | 16 | .500 |
| George Washington | 6 | – | 10 | .375 | 16 | – | 15 | .516 |
| UMass | 5 | – | 11 | .313 | 12 | – | 20 | .375 |
| Saint Joseph's | 5 | – | 11 | .313 | 11 | – | 20 | .355 |
| La Salle | 4 | – | 12 | .250 | 12 | – | 18 | .400 |
| Fordham | 0 | – | 16 | .000 | 2 | – | 26 | .071 |
† 2010 Atlantic 10 Tournament winner Rankings from AP Poll

The 2009–10 Charlotte 49ers men's basketball team represented the University of North Carolina at Charlotte in the 2009–10 college basketball season. This was head coach Bobby Lutz's twelfth season at Charlotte. The 49ers compete in the Atlantic 10 Conference and played their home games at Dale F. Halton Arena. They finished the season 19–12, 9–7 in A-10 play and lost in the first round of the 2010 Atlantic 10 men's basketball tournament. They were not invited to a post season tournament.

== Roster ==
| # | Name | Height | Weight (lbs.) | Position | Class | Hometown | Previous Team(s) |
|---|---|---|---|---|---|---|---|
| 00 | Barnett, Javarris | 6'6" | 200 | G | So. | Charlotte, NC, U.S. | Victory Christian |
| 1 | Derrio Green | 6'2" | 160 | G | So. | Panama City, FL, U.S. | Mosley HS |
| 2 | KJ Sherrill | 6'7" | 225 | F | Fr. | Cleveland, NC, U.S. | West Rowan HS |
| 3 | DiJuan Harris | 5'9" | 170 | G | Sr. | Charlotte, NC, U.S. | Victory Christian HS |
| 5 | Phil Jones | 6'10" | 255 | C | Jr. | Brooklyn, NY, U.S. | Laurinburg Prep |
| 11 | Ian Andersen | 6'4" | 200 | G | Sr. | Portland, OR, U.S. | Wilson HS |
| 12 | Colby Lewis | 6'2" | 185 | G | Fr. | Clemmons, NC, U.S. | Forsyth Country Day School |
| 14 | Kyle Church | 5'11" | 170 | G | Sr. | Durham, NC, U.S. | Riverside HS |
| 15 | Gokhan Sirin | 6'9" | 200 | F | Fr. | Istanbul, Turkey | St. Mary's Ryken HS |
| 21 | An'Juan Wilderness | 6'6" | 220 | F | Jr. | Dunwoody, GA, U.S. | Dunwoody HS |
| 22 | RaShad Coleman | 6'5" | 186 | G | Sr. | LaGrange, GA, U.S. | LaGrange HS |
| 31 | Charles Dewhurst | 6'5" | 190 | G | Jr. | Charlotte, NC, U.S. | Charlotte Latin School |
| 35 | Chris Braswell | 6'9" | 235 | F | Fr. | Capitol Heights, MD, U.S. | Hargrave Military Academy |
| 43 | Shamari Spears | 6'6" | 245 | F | Jr. | Salisbury, NC | U.S., Salisbury HS |

== Schedule and results ==
| Date time, TV | Rank^{#} | Opponent^{#} | Result | Record | Site (attendance) city, state |
Regular Season
| 11/13/2009*; 7:30pm | | UNC Asheville | W 86–70 | 1–0 | Halton Arena (6,552); Charlotte, NC |
| 11/16/2009*; 9:30pm | | vs. Elon; NIT Season Tip-Off | W 75–61 | 2–0 | Cameron Indoor Stadium (9,314); Durham, NC |
| 11/17/2009*; 6:00pm, ESPN2 | | at No. 9 Duke; NIT Season Tip-Off | L 59–101 | 2–1 | Cameron Indoor Stadium (9,314); Durham, NC |
| 11/23/2009*; 4:30pm | | vs. Yale; NIT Season Tip-Off | W 88–74 | 3–1 | Mack Sports Complex; Hempstead, NY |
| 11/24/2009*; 7:00pm | | at Hofstra; NIT Season Tip-Off | W 80–72 | 4–1 | Mack Sports Complex (783); Hempstead, NY |
| 12/2/2009*; 8:00pm | | East Carolina | W 80–68 | 5–1 | Halton Arena (6,634); Charlotte, NC |
| 12/5/2009*; 7:00pm, ESPNU | | at No. 20 Louisville | W 87–65 | 6–1 | Freedom Hall (19,221); Louisville, KY |
| 12/8/2009*; 8:00pm | | Winston-Salem State | W 94–52 | 7–1 | Halton Arena (6,022); Charlotte, NC |
| 12/12/2009*; 3:30pm | | Gardner–Webb | W 95–66 | 8–1 | Halton Arena (5,425); Charlotte, NC |
| 12/20/2009*; 4:00pm | | at Winthrop | W 57–47 | 9–1 | Rock Hill, SC (3,084); Winthrop Coliseum |
| 12/23/2009*; 7:00pm | | at Old Dominion | L 48–81 | 9–2 | Ted Constant Convocation Center (6,513); Norfolk, VA |
| 12/29/2009*; 7:30pm | | Mercer | W 91–80 | 10–2 | Halton Arena (5,460); Charlotte, NC |
| 1/2/2010*; 7:00pm | | No. 20 Georgia Tech | L 67–76 | 10–3 | Halton Arena (9,105); Charlotte, NC |
| 1/6/2010*; 7:00pm, CSS | | at No. 16 Tennessee | L 71–88 | 10–4 | Thompson–Boling Arena (17,023); Knoxville, TN |
| 1/9/2010; 7:00pm | | St. Bonaventure | W 57–54 | 11–4 (1–0) | Halton Arena (5,683); Charlotte, NC |
| 1/13/2010; 7:30pm | | at Xavier | L 74–86 | 11–5 (1–1) | Cintas Center (10,137); Cincinnati, OH |
| 1/17/2010; 4:00pm, CBSCS | | Saint Louis | W 63–61 ^{OT} | 12–5 (2–1) | Halton Arena (5,570); Charlotte, NC |
| 1/20/2010; 7:00pm | | at Richmond | W 71–59 | 13–5 (3–1) | Robins Center (4,042); Richmond, VA |
| 1/23/2010; 2:00pm | | at La Salle | W 84–82 | 14–5 (4–1) | Tom Gola Arena (3,022); Philadelphia, PA |
| 1/27/2010; 7:00pm, CBSCS | | No. 15 Temple | W 74–64 | 15–5 (5–1) | Halton Arena (7,623); Charlotte, NC |
| 1/30/2010; 6:00pm, ESPNU | | at UMass | W 72–58 | 16–5 (6–1) | Mullins Center (6,003); Amherst, MA |
| 2/3/2010; 7:30pm | | George Washington | W 72–68 | 17–5 (7–1) | Halton Arena (5,743); Charlotte, NC |
| 2/6/2010; 2:00pm, MASN | | at Fordham | W 77–72 | 18–5 (8–1) | Rose Hill Gymnasium; Bronx, NY |
| 2/10/2010; 7:00pm | | at Dayton | L 47–75 | 18–6 (8–2) | UD Arena (12,716); Dayton, OH |
| 2/17/2010; 7:00pm, CBSCS | | Duquesne | L 77–83 | 18–7 (8–3) | Halton Arena (5,720); Charlotte, NC |
| 2/20/2010; 2:00pm, CBSCS | | Xavier | L 67–81 | 18–8 (8–4) | Halton Arena (9,105); Charlotte, NC |
| 2/24/2010; 7:30pm | | Saint Joseph's | W 95–58 | 19–8 (9–4) | Halton Arena (5,204); Charlotte, NC |
| 2/27/2010; 6:00pm, MASN | | at George Washington | L 70–75 | 19–9 (9–5) | Charles E. Smith Center (2,979); Washington, DC |
| 3/3/2010; 7:00pm | | at Rhode Island | L 58–80 | 19–10 (9–6) | Ryan Center (6,984); Kingston, RI |
| 3/6/2010; 2:00pm | | Richmond | L 84–89 ^{OT} | 19–11 (9–7) | Halton Arena (6,559); Charlotte, NC |
Atlantic 10 tournament
| 3/9/2010; 7:00pm | (11) | (6) UMass; A-10 First Round | L 56–59 | 19–12 | Halton Arena (1,941); Charlotte, NC |
*Non-conference game. ^{#}Rankings from AP Poll. (#) Tournament seedings in parentheses. All times are in Eastern Time. Source
