= 2009–10 George Washington Colonials men's basketball team =

American college basketball season

2009–10 George Washington Colonials men's basketball

CBI, First Round
- Conference: Atlantic 10 Conference
- Record: 16–15 (6–10 A-10)
- Head coach: Karl Hobbs (9th season)
- Assistant coaches: Roland Houston (6th season); Greg Collucci (4th season); Brian Ellerbe (1st season)
- Home arena: Charles E. Smith Center

2009–10 Atlantic 10 men's basketball standings
	Conf.				Overall
Team	W		L	PCT	W		L	PCT
No. 12 Temple†	14	–	2	.875	29	–	6	.829
No. 25 Xavier	14	–	2	.875	26	–	9	.743
No. 24 Richmond	13	–	3	.813	26	–	9	.743
Saint Louis	11	–	5	.688	23	–	13	.639
Rhode Island	9	–	7	.563	26	–	10	.722
Charlotte	9	–	7	.563	19	–	12	.613
Dayton	8	–	8	.500	25	–	12	.676
St. Bonaventure	7	–	9	.438	15	–	16	.484
Duquesne	7	–	9	.438	16	–	16	.500
George Washington	6	–	10	.375	16	–	15	.516
UMass	5	–	11	.313	12	–	20	.375
Saint Joseph's	5	–	11	.313	11	–	20	.355
La Salle	4	–	12	.250	12	–	18	.400
Fordham	0	–	16	.000	2	–	26	.071
† 2010 Atlantic 10 Tournament winner Rankings from AP Poll

The 2009–10 George Washington Colonials men's basketball team represented George Washington University in the 2009–10 NCAA Division I men's basketball season. The Colonials were led by head coach Karl Hobbs in his ninth year leading the team. George Washington played their home games at the Charles E. Smith Center in Washington, D.C., as members of the Atlantic 10 Conference.

The Colonials finished conference play with an 6–10 record, earning the 10th seed in the Atlantic 10 tournament. George Washington was eliminated in the first round of the A-10 tournament by Dayton.

George Washington failed to qualify for the NCAA tournament, but were invited to the 2010 College Basketball Invitational. The Colonials were eliminated in the first round of the CBI by eventual tournament champion VCU, 79–73.

The Colonials finished the season with a 16–15 record.

== Roster ==
2009–10 George Washington Colonials men's basketball team
Players
Coaches

Pos.	#	Name	Height	Weight	Year	Hometown
F	00	Dwayne Smith	6 ft 6 in (1.98 m)	215 lb (98 kg)	Fr	Toronto, Ontario, Canada
G	1	Travis King	6 ft 2 in (1.88 m)	215 lb (98 kg)	Jr	New Haven, Connecticut
G	3	Tony Taylor	6 ft 1 in (1.85 m)	191 lb (87 kg)	So	Sleepy Hollow, New York
G	4	Jeff Alston	5 ft 10 in (1.78 m)	175 lb (79 kg)	GS	Silver Spring, Maryland
G	5	Bryan Bynes	6 ft 3 in (1.91 m)	160 lb (73 kg)	Fr	Fort Lauderdale, Florida
G	10	Michael Conward	6 ft 3 in (1.91 m)	183 lb (83 kg)	So	Miami, Florida
F	12	David Pellom	6 ft 8 in (2.03 m)	212 lb (96 kg)	Jr	Wilmington, North Carolina
F	13	Jabari Edwards	6 ft 10 in (2.08 m)	222 lb (101 kg)	Jr	Brooklyn, New York
G/F	15	Aaron Ware	6 ft 5 in (1.96 m)	201 lb (91 kg)	So	Los Angeles, California
G	20	Lasan Kromah	6 ft 5 in (1.96 m)	190 lb (86 kg)	Fr	Greenbelt, Maryland
F	22	Damian Hollis	6 ft 8 in (2.03 m)	215 lb (98 kg)	Sr	Fort Lauderdale, Florida
G	32	Tim Johnson	6 ft 3 in (1.91 m)	180 lb (82 kg)	Fr	Harvey, Illinois
C	33	Daymon Warren	6 ft 9 in (2.06 m)	223 lb (101 kg)	Fr	Richmond, California
C	42	Joseph Katuka	6 ft 11 in (2.11 m)	222 lb (101 kg)	Jr	Zaria, Nigeria
F	44	Hermann Opoku	6 ft 10 in (2.08 m)	236 lb (107 kg)	Sr	Vienna, Austria

Head coach

- Karl Hobbs (Connecticut)

Assistant coach(es)

- Greg Collucci (George Washington)
- Brian Ellerbe (Rutgers)
- Roland Houston (Rhode Island)

Legend

- (C) Team captain
- (S) Suspended
- (I) Ineligible
- (W) Walk-on
- Injured
- Current redshirt

Roster
Last update: February 15, 2023

== Schedule and results ==
Date time, TV	Rank^{#}	Opponent^{#}	Result	Record	Site (attendance) city, state
Exhibition
November 7, 2009*; 1:00 pm		West Georgia	W 78–44	—	Charles E. Smith Center; Washington, D.C.
Regular season
November 15, 2009*; 4:30 pm		at UNC Wilmington	W 76–71	1–0	Trask Coliseum (3,079); Wilmington, NC
November 17, 2009*; 7:00 pm		at Boston University	W 69–59	2–0	Agganis Arena (2,149); Boston, MA
November 21, 2009*; 2:00 pm		UMBC	W 94–51	3–0	Charles E. Smith Center (1,924); Washington, D.C.
November 24, 2009*; 7:00 pm		Princeton	W 65–50	4–0	Charles E. Smith Center (1,315); Washington, D.C.
November 28, 2009*; 2:00 pm		Oregon State	L 57–64	4–1	Charles E. Smith Center (2,401); Washington, D.C.
December 2, 2009*; 7:00 pm		George Mason; Rivalry	W 66–49	5–1	Charles E. Smith Center (4,125); Washington, D.C.
December 6, 2009*; 5:00 pm		vs. Navy; BB&T Classic	W 81–69	6–1	Verizon Center (16,389); Washington, D.C.
December 9, 2009*; 7:00 pm		Providence	L 97–110	6–2	Charles E. Smith Center (3,015); Washington, D.C.
December 12, 2009*; 4:00 pm		at Towson	W 73–69	7–2	Towson Center (1,558); Towson, MD
December 22, 2009*; 7:00 pm		at East Carolina	W 84–80 ^{OT}	8–2	Williams Arena at Minges Coliseum (3,468); Greenville, NC
December 28, 2009*; 7:00 pm		at Holy Cross	W 70–68	9–2	Hart Center (2,872); Worcester, MA
December 30, 2009*; 7:00 pm		at Harvard	L 53–66	9–3	Lavietes Pavilion (1,670); Cambridge, MA
January 2, 2010*; 2:30 pm		Howard	W 81–63	10–3	Charles E. Smith Center (1216); Washington, D.C.
January 6, 2010; 7:00 pm		at St. Bonaventure	W 78–71	11–3 (1–0)	Reilly Center (3,685); St. Bonaventure, NY
January 10, 2010; 12:00 pm		Xavier	L 69–76	11–4 (1–1)	Charles E. Smith Center (3,002); Washington, D.C.
January 13, 2010; 7:00 pm		at La Salle	L 64–65	11–5 (1–2)	Tom Gola Arena (1,630); Philadelphia, PA
January 20, 2010; 7:00 pm		at Dayton	L 51–66	11–6 (1–3)	UD Arena (12,630); Dayton, OH
January 23, 2010; 2:00 pm		Richmond	L 57–62	11–7 (1–4)	Charles E. Smith Center (3,298); Washington, D.C.
January 27, 2010; 7:00 pm		Saint Louis	W 67–62 ^{OT}	12–7 (2–4)	Charles E. Smith Center (1,782); Washington, D.C.
January 30, 2010; 1:00 pm		at Rhode Island	L 66–72	12–8 (2–5)	Ryan Center (7,280); Kingston, RI
February 3, 2010; 7:30 pm		at Charlotte	L 68–72	12–9 (2–6)	Dale F. Halton Arena (5,743); Charlotte, NC
February 6, 2010; 2:00 pm		Duquesne	L 63–70	12–10 (2–7)	Charles E. Smith Center (1,507); Washington, D.C.
February 13, 2010; 1:00 pm		at Fordham	W 78–53	13–10 (3–7)	Rose Hill Gymnasium (2,634); The Bronx, NY
February 17, 2010; 7:00 pm		UMass	W 66–60	14–10 (4–7)	Charles E. Smith Center (1,646); Washington, D.C.
February 20, 2010; 7:00 pm		at No. 20 Richmond	L 70–74	14–11 (4–8)	Robins Center (9,025); Richmond, VA
February 24, 2010; 7:00 pm		La Salle	W 81–72	15–11 (5–8)	Charles E. Smith Center (1,797); Washington, D.C.
February 27, 2010; 6:00 pm		Charlotte	W 75–70	16–11 (6–8)	Charles E. Smith Center (2,979); Washington, D.C.
March 3, 2010; 7:00 pm		Saint Joseph's	L 71–80	16–12 (6–9)	Charles E. Smith Center (2,313); Washington, D.C.
March 6, 2010; 2:00 pm		at No. 25 Temple	L 57–70	16–13 (6–10)	Liacouras Center (6,356); Philadelphia, PA
Atlantic 10 tournament
March 9, 2010; 7:00 pm	(10)	at (7) Dayton; A-10 First Round	L 60–70	16–14	UD Arena (6,930); Dayton, OH
CBI
March 17, 2010; 7:00 pm		VCU; CBI First Round	L 73–79	16–15	Charles E. Smith Center (793); Washington, D.C.
*Non-conference game. ^{#}Rankings from AP Poll. (#) Tournament seedings in parentheses. All times are in Eastern Time. Source
