= 2009–10 UMass Minutemen basketball team =

American college basketball season

2009–10 UMass Minutemen men's basketball
- Conference: Atlantic 10 Conference
- Record: 12–20 (5–11 A-10)
- Head coach: Derek Kellogg (2nd season)
- Assistant coaches: Adam Ginsburg; Antwon Jackson; Vance Walberg
- Home arena: William D. Mullins Memorial Center

2009–10 Atlantic 10 men's basketball standings
	Conf.				Overall
Team	W		L	PCT	W		L	PCT
No. 12 Temple†	14	–	2	.875	29	–	6	.829
No. 25 Xavier	14	–	2	.875	26	–	9	.743
No. 24 Richmond	13	–	3	.813	26	–	9	.743
Saint Louis	11	–	5	.688	23	–	13	.639
Rhode Island	9	–	7	.563	26	–	10	.722
Charlotte	9	–	7	.563	19	–	12	.613
Dayton	8	–	8	.500	25	–	12	.676
St. Bonaventure	7	–	9	.438	15	–	16	.484
Duquesne	7	–	9	.438	16	–	16	.500
George Washington	6	–	10	.375	16	–	15	.516
UMass	5	–	11	.313	12	–	20	.375
Saint Joseph's	5	–	11	.313	11	–	20	.355
La Salle	4	–	12	.250	12	–	18	.400
Fordham	0	–	16	.000	2	–	26	.071
† 2010 Atlantic 10 Tournament winner Rankings from AP Poll

The 2009–10 UMass Minutemen basketball team represented the University of Massachusetts Amherst during the 2009–10 NCAA Division I men's basketball season. The Minutemen were led by second year head coach Derek Kellogg and played their home games at William D. Mullins Memorial Center. They were members of the Atlantic 10 Conference. They finished the season 12–20, 5–11 in A-10 play to finish in 11th place. The Minutemen lost to Richmond in the A-10 tournament.

== Roster ==
2009–10 UMass Minutemen men's basketball team
Pos	No	Name	Class	Height	Weight	Hometown	Summary
G	1	David Gibbs	6–4	185	SO	East Hartford, CT	2.6 Pts, 1.8 Reb, 2.4 Ast
G/F	2	Terrell Vinson	6–7	205	FR	Baltimore, Maryland	9.6 Pts, 5.4 Reb, 0.9 Ast
G	4	Lex Mongo	5–11	180	SR	Boston, Massachusetts	0.0 Pts, 0.0 Reb, 0.3 Ast
G	5	Ricky Harris	6–2	175	SR	Baltimore, Maryland	19.8 Pts, 3.5 Reb, 2.9 Ast
G/F	10	Javorn Farrell	6–5	180	FR	Woodbridge, Virginia	4.6 Pts, 3.6 Reb, 1.4 Ast
G	11	Gary Correia	6–1	180	JR	Providence, Rhode Island	2.2 Pts, 1.7 Reb, 2.2 As
G	12	Anthony Gurley	6–3	185	RS JR	Boston, Massachusetts	13.6 Pts, 4.2 Reb, 1.0 Ast
F	13	Trey Lang	6–7	215	RS SO	Marietta, Georgia	0.8 Pts, 0.8 Reb, 0.1 Ast
F	22	Sampson Carter	6–8	200	FR	Baton Rouge, Louisiana	4.3 Pts, 3.4 Reb, 0.4 Ast
F	23	Sean Carter	6–9	225	RS SO	Fayetteville, North Carolina	5.1 Pts, 7.1 Reb, 0.9 Ast
G	24	Freddie Riley	6–5	175	FR	Ocala, Florida	9.3 Pts, 2.0 Reb, 0.6 Ast
F	34	Raphiael Putney	6–8	180	FR	Woodbridge, Virginia	
F/C	35	Hashim Bailey	6–10	275	RS JR	Paterson, New Jersey	2.5 Pts, 4.7 Reb, 0.1 Ast
F	50	Matt Hill	6–7	210	RS SO	Middletown, Connecticut	0.5 Pts, 1.3 Reb, 0.0 Ast
G		Bud Gaffney	6-0	175	JR	Berkley, Massachusetts	

== Schedule ==
Date time, TV	Rank^{#}	Opponent^{#}	Result	Record	Site (attendance) city, state
Exhibition
11/07/2009*; 7:00 pm		Dowling	W 80-78	—	Mullins Center; Amherst, MA
Regular season
11/13/2009*; 7:00 pm		at UCF	L 67–84	0–1	UCF Arena (8,727); Orlando, Florida
11/18/2009*; 7:30 pm		Cornell; Legends Classic	L 61–74	0–2	Mullins Center (3,482); Amherst, MA
11/21/2009*; 7:00 pm		Arkansas–Fort Smith; Legends Classic	W 94–68	1–2	Mullins Center (2,866); Amherst, MA
11/24/2009*; 7:00 pm		St. Francis Brooklyn	W 83–65	2–2	Mullins Center (2,411); Amherst, MA
11/27/2009*; 5:30 pm		vs. Rutgers; Legends Classic	L 75–83	2–3	Boardwalk Hall; Atlantic City, New Jersey
11/28/2009*; 5:30 pm		vs. No. 2 Michigan State; Legends Classic	L 68–106	2-4	Boardwalk Hall (3,836); Atlantic City, NJ
12/2/2009*; 7:00 pm		Quinnipiac	W 62–58	3–4	Mullins Center (2,502); Amherst, MA
12/5/2009*; 3:30 pm		at Holy Cross	W 84–63	4–4	DCU Center (2,028); Worcester, Massachusetts
12/07/2009*; 7:00 pm		at Seton Hall	L 68–86	4-5	Prudential Center (5,861); Newark, New Jersey
12/11/2009*; 8:00 pm		Grambling State	W 81-58	5-5	Mullins Center (2,421); Amherst, MA
12/19/2009*; 6:00 pm		Memphis	W 73-72	6-5	TD Garden (8,096); Boston, Massachusetts
12/23/2009*; 2:00 pm		at Boston College; Commonwealth Classic	L 67-79	6-6	Conte Forum (6,519); Chestnut Hill, Massachusetts
12/30/2009*; 7:00 pm		at Davidson	L 61-63	6-7	Belk Arena (4,122); Davidson, North Carolina
1/06/2010; 7:30 pm		Fordham	W 78-76	7–7 (1-0)	Mullins Center (3,557); Amherst, MA
01/10/2010; 2:00 pm		La Salle	L 74-80	7-8 (1–1)	Mullins Center (4,012); Amherst, MA
01/13/2010; 7:00 pm		at Richmond	L 63-70	7-9 (1–2)	Robins Center (4,019); Richmond, Virginia
01/16/2010; 2:00 pm		at No. 19 Temple	L 64-76	7-10 (1–3)	Liacouras Center (4,263); Philadelphia, Pennsylvania
01/20/2010; 7:00 pm		St. Bonaventure	L 69–70	7–11 (1-4)	Mullins Center (3,121); Amherst, MA
01/23/2010*; 7:00 pm		at Baylor	L 45–71	7–12	Ferrell Center (7,779); Waco, Texas
01/27/2010; 7:00 pm		at Saint Joseph's	W 87-80	8-12 (2-4)	Hagan Arena (4,051); Philadelphia, Pennsylvania
1/30/2010; 6:00 pm		Charlotte	L 58–72	8-13 (2–5)	Mullins Center (6,003); Amherst, MA
02/3/2010; 7:00 pm		Xavier	L 79-87	8-14 (2-6)	Mullins Center (3,538); Amherst, MA
02/6/2010; 2:00 pm		at Rhode Island	L 85-93	8-15 (2-7)	Ryan Center (7,579); Kingston, Rhode Island
02/11/2010; 7:00 pm		at Duquesne	W 84-80	9-15 (3-7)	Palumbo Center (2,602); Pittsburgh, Pennsylvania
02/14/2010; 4:00 pm		Saint Joseph's	W 70-62	10-15 (4-7)	Mullins Center (4,833); Amherst, MA
02/17/2010; 7:00 pm		at George Washington	L 60-66	10-16 (4-8)	Charles E. Smith Center (1,646); Washington, DC
02/21/2010; 4:00 pm		Saint Louis	L 56-69	10–17 (4-9)	Mullins Center (3,454); Amherst, MA
02/27/2010; 7:00 pm		at Dayton	L 68-96	10-18 (4-10)	UD Arena (13,435); Dayton, Ohio
03/3/2010; 7:00 pm		at La Salle	L 78–89	10-19 (4-11)	Tom Gola Arena (1,810); Philadelphia, Pennsylvania
03/6/2010; 4:00 pm		Rhode Island	W 69-67	11-19 (5-11)	Mullins Center (5,527); Amherst, MA
Atlantic 10 tournament
03/9/2010; 4:00 pm	(11)	at (6) Charlotte; A-10 First Round	W 59-56	12-19	Halton Arena (1,941); Charlotte, North Carolina
03/12/2010; 9:30 pm	(11)	vs. (3) Richmond; A-10 Quarterfinals	L 72-77	12-20	Boardwalk Hall (6,027); Atlantic City, New Jersey
*Non-conference game. ^{#}Rankings from AP Poll. (#) Tournament seedings in parentheses. All times are in Eastern Time.
