= 2009–10 Saint Louis Billikens men's basketball team =

American college basketball season

2009–10 Saint Louis Billikens men's basketball
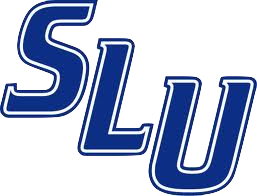

CBI, Finals
- Conference: Atlantic 10 Conference
- Record: 23–13 (11–5 A-10)
- Head coach: Rick Majerus
- Assistant coaches: Porter Moser; Chris Harriman; Alex Jensen
- Home arena: Chaifetz Arena

2009–10 Atlantic 10 men's basketball standings
	Conf.				Overall
Team	W		L	PCT	W		L	PCT
No. 12 Temple†	14	–	2	.875	29	–	6	.829
No. 25 Xavier	14	–	2	.875	26	–	9	.743
No. 24 Richmond	13	–	3	.813	26	–	9	.743
Saint Louis	11	–	5	.688	23	–	13	.639
Rhode Island	9	–	7	.563	26	–	10	.722
Charlotte	9	–	7	.563	19	–	12	.613
Dayton	8	–	8	.500	25	–	12	.676
St. Bonaventure	7	–	9	.438	15	–	16	.484
Duquesne	7	–	9	.438	16	–	16	.500
George Washington	6	–	10	.375	16	–	15	.516
UMass	5	–	11	.313	12	–	20	.375
Saint Joseph's	5	–	11	.313	11	–	20	.355
La Salle	4	–	12	.250	12	–	18	.400
Fordham	0	–	16	.000	2	–	26	.071
† 2010 Atlantic 10 Tournament winner Rankings from AP Poll

The 2009–10 Saint Louis Billikens men's basketball team represented Saint Louis University in the 2009–10 college basketball season. This was head coach Rick Majerus's third season at Saint Louis. The Billikens compete in the Atlantic 10 Conference and played their home games at Chaifetz Arena. They finished the season 23–13, 11–5 in A-10 play and lost in the quarterfinals of the 2010 Atlantic 10 men's basketball tournament. They were invited to the 2010 College Basketball Invitational where they advanced to the best-of-3 games final. They lost 0–2 to VCU.

== 2009-10 Roster ==
NO	Name	Position	Height	Weight	Year	Hometown (Last School)
3	Kwamain Mitchell	Guard	5-10	175	SO	Milwaukee, Wisconsin (Dominican)
10	Paul Eckerle	Guard	6-1	175	JR	Washington, Missouri (St. Francis Borgia)
12	Justin Jordan	Guard	5-9	179	FR	Fort Wayne, Indiana (North Side)
13	Femi John	Guard	6-2	205	RS FR	St. Louis, Missouri (McCluer North)
14	Brian Conklin	Forward	6-6	230	SO	North Eugene, Oregon (North Eugene)
15	Christian Salecich	Guard	6-3	190	FR	Gold Coast, Australia (Australian Institute of Sport)
20	Darrin Young	Guard	5-10	165	FR	Kirkwood, Missouri (Kirkwood)
21	Jon Smith	Forward	6-5	190	FR	Columbus, Ohio (Grove City)
22	Jeff Reid	Guard	6-4	185	FR	Topeka, Kansas (Hayden)
23	Kyle Cassity	Guard	6-3	200	SO	Tamaroa, Illinois(Pinckneyville)
24	Cody Ellis	Forward	6-8	240	FR	Perth, Australia (Australian Institute of Sport)
32	Cory Remekun	Forward	6-7	205	FR	Dallas, Texas (Mesquite))
33	Willie Reed	Forward	6-9	220	SO	Kansas City, Missouri (Bishop Miege)

== Schedule and results ==
Date time, TV	Rank^{#}	Opponent^{#}	Result	Record	Site (attendance) city, state
Exhibition
10/30/2009*; 8:00pm		Arkansas–Fort Smith	W 79–51	—	Chaifetz Arena; St. Louis, Missouri
11/7/2009*; 2:00pm		St. Ambrose	W 61–47	—	Chaifetz Arena; St. Louis, Missouri
Regular Season
11/14/2009*; 7:00pm		Southeast Missouri State	W 59–41	1–0	Chaifetz Arena (7,131); St. Louis, Missouri
11/18/2009*; 7:00pm, FS Midwest		Nebraska	W 69–55	2–0	Chaifetz Arena (7,596); St. Louis, Missouri
11/22/2009*; 1:00pm		Kennesaw State; Chicago Invitational Challenge	W 76–66	3–0	Chaifetz Arena (6,538); St. Louis, Missouri
11/24/2009*; 7:00pm		Mississippi Valley State; Chicago Invitational Challenge	W 75–39	4–0	Chaifetz Arena (6,842); St. Louis, Missouri
11/27/2009*; 5:00pm		vs. Iowa State; Chicago Invitational Challenge	L 54–65	4–1	UIC Pavilion; Chicago, Illinois
11/28/2009*; 4:30pm		vs. Notre Dame; Chicago Invitational Challenge	L 52–64	4–2	UIC Pavilion; Chicago, Illinois
12/2/2009*; 6:00pm, FS Midwest		at Georgia	L 56–64	4–3	Stegeman Coliseum (4,650); Athens, Georgia
12/5/2009*; 7:00pm, KPLR		Southern Illinois	W 71–61	5–3	Chaifetz Arena (9,483); St. Louis, Missouri
12/12/2009*; 7:00pm		Rockhurst	W 66–53	6–3	Chaifetz Arena (7,823); St. Louis, Missouri
12/16/2009*; 7:00pm		Belmont	W 75–67	7–3	Chaifetz Arena (6,432); St. Louis, Missouri
12/19/2009*; 7:00pm, KPLR		Missouri State	L 63–73	7–4	Chaifetz Arena (8,483); St. Louis, Missouri
12/22/2009*; 7:00pm		UMKC	W 61–54	8–4	Chaifetz Arena (6,762); St. Louis, Missouri
12/29/2009*; 7:00pm		Eastern Illinois	W 60–42	9–4	Chaifetz Arena (7,354); St. Louis, Missouri
1/2/2010*; 6:00pm		at Bowling Green	L 50–59	9–5	Anderson Arena (1,518); Bowling Green, Ohio
1/9/2010; 4:00pm, FS Midwest		Richmond	W 63–58	10–5 (1–0)	Chaifetz Arena (8,134); St. Louis, Missouri
1/13/2010; 6:00pm		Duquesne	W 79–75 ^{2OT}	11–5 (2–0)	A. J. Palumbo Center (2,563); Pittsburgh, Pennsylvania
1/17/2010; 3:00pm, CBSCS		at Charlotte	L 61–63 ^{OT}	11–6 (2–1)	Dale F. Halton Arena (5,570); Charlotte, North Carolina
1/20/2010; 7:00pm, KPLR		Fordham	W 75–48	12–6 (3–1)	Chaifetz Arena (7,076); St. Louis, Missouri
1/27/2010; 6:00pm		at George Washington	L 62–67 ^{OT}	12–7 (3–2)	Charles E. Smith Athletic Center (1,782); Washington, D.C.
1/30/2010; 1:00pm, CCIN		at Richmond	L 36–62	12–8 (3–3)	Robins Center (3,193); Richmond, Virginia
2/3/2010; 7:00pm, KPLR		St. Bonaventure	W 67–65	13–8 (4–3)	Chaifetz Arena (6,687); St. Louis, Missouri
2/6/2010; 3:00pm, CCIN		at La Salle	W 68–65	14–8 (5–3)	Tom Gola Arena (1,177); Philadelphia, Pennsylvania
2/9/2010; 6:00pm, CCIN		at Saint Joseph's	W 56–52	15–8 (6–3)	Hagan Arena (3,152); Philadelphia, Pennsylvania
2/13/2010; 3:00pm, ESPNU		Dayton	W 68–65 ^{2OT}	16–8 (7–3)	Chaifetz Arena (9,453); St. Louis, Missouri
2/17/2010; 8:00pm, CCIN		Rhode Island	W 62–57	17–8 (8–3)	Chaifetz Arena (7,257); St. Louis, Missouri
2/21/2010; 3:00pm		at UMass	W 69–56	18–8 (9–3)	Mullins Center (3,454); Amherst, Massachusetts
2/24/2010; 7:00pm, FS Midwest		Xavier	L 71–73	18–9 (9–4)	Chaifetz Arena (10,008); St. Louis, Missouri
2/27/2010; 7:00pm, KPLR		Duquesne	W 69–59	19–9 (10–4)	Chaifetz Arena (8,169); St. Louis, Missouri
3/3/2010; 7:00pm, FS Midwest		No. 20 Temple	L 51–57	19–10 (10–5)	Chaifetz Arena (7,984); St. Louis, Missouri
3/6/2010; 6:00pm, CCIN		at Dayton	W 71–66	20–10 (11–5)	UD Arena (13,435); Dayton, Ohio
Atlantic 10 tournament
3/12/2010; 1:30pm, CBSCS	(4)	vs. (5) Rhode Island; A-10 Quarterfinals	L 47–63	20–11	Boardwalk Hall (5,416); Atlantic City, New Jersey
CBI
3/16/2010; 8:00pm, HDNet		Indiana State; CBI First Round	W 63–54	21–11	Chaifetz Arena (3,542); St. Louis, Missouri
3/22/2010; 8:00pm, HDNet		Green Bay; CBI Quarterfinals	W 68–62 ^{2OT}	22–11	Chaifetz Arena (4,235); St. Louis, Missouri
3/24/2010; 8:00pm, HDNet		Princeton; CBI Semifinals	W 69–59	23–11	Chaifetz Arena (4,682); St. Louis, Missouri
3/29/2010; 6:00pm, HDNet		at VCU; CBI Finals – Game 1	L 56–68	23–12	Stuart C. Siegel Center (4,386); Richmond, Virginia
3/31/2010; 7:00pm, HDNet		VCU; CBI Finals – Game 2	L 65–71	23–13	Chaifetz Arena (5,612); St. Louis, Missouri
*Non-conference game. ^{#}Rankings from AP Poll. (#) Tournament seedings in parentheses. All times are in Central Time. Source
