= Yves Mekongo Mbala =

Cameroonian basketball player (born 1987)

Personal information
- Born: July 25, 1987 (age 39) Yaoundé, Cameroon
- Listed height: 201 cm (6 ft 7 in)
- Listed weight: 100 kg (220 lb)

Career information
- High school: St. Patrick (Elizabeth, New Jersey)
- College: La Salle (2006–2010)
- NBA draft: 2010: undrafted
- Playing career: 2010–2012
- Position: Small forward / power forward

Career history
- 2010–2011: Factum Sport Debrecen
- 2011: Basket Navarra Club
- 2012: Amicale Steinsel

Career highlights
- First-team Academic All-American (2010); Sedond-team Academic All-American (2009)

Yves Lionel Mekongo Mbala (born July 25, 1987) is a Cameroonian basketball player who has played collegiately and professionally.

== College career ==
After leading St. Patrick high school to the state title in their category and earning individual awards, including being on the honor roll, Mekongo Mbala committed in October 2005 to La Salle University to play in the Atlantic 10 Conference of the Division I (NCAA). He was one of the many freshmen in coach John Giannini's recruiting class including St Patrick teammate and friend Ruben Guillandeaux.

The squad was a young team with few returning starters and Mekongo Mbala acquired significant gametime, with solid stats, especially in rebounding where he was second best of the team. In his sophomore season, as a starter, he posted nearly identical stats, again second best rebounder of his team. He earned the first of many individual awards, a selection to the All-Atlantic 10 Academic Team for 2008.

His junior year proved to be a breakthrough season, still a starter, he was his team's best rebounder and third best scorer. More so, he was recognised for his academic capabilities with an array of awards including a selection to the 2009 Academic All-American Second Team and the All-A-10 Academic Team.

His senior season saw him continue as a starter and a valuable contributor for his team, however a pinkie finger injury suffered in a 14 February 2010 game saw him miss all but 1 of the Explorers last 9 games, playing his final college game with his ring finger and pinkie taped together.

In contrast it proved to be his most successful season off the court as his 3.81 GPA and athletic prowess amongst other qualities earned him numerous personal awards including selections to the Academic All-American First Team and the All-A-10 Academic Team in which he was also named Student-Athlete of the Year. He also was awarded the NACDA Division I-AAA Men's Basketball Scholar-Athlete of the Year award after having also made the Scholar-Athlete Team in 2008 and 2009.

== Professional career ==
As part of one of the weakest programs of the conference (with a Conference tournament second round in 2008 as best result in 4 years) Mekongo Mbala's exposure on the court had been limited, he used the Eurobasket.com Summer League to show his skills and was selected to New York City All Tournament First Team

He signed his first professional contract in October 2010, with Hungarian side Factum Sport Debrecen of the NB I/A.

Following a good first pro season, where he had 19.3 points and 8.2 rebounds on average in 25 games, he moved to the stronger Liga Española de Baloncesto, the Spanish second division, where he joined Grupo Iruña Navarra in July 2011. He joined along with Debrecen teammate Kevin Langford and also re-encountered former La Salle teammate Kimmani Barrett in unfortunate circumstances as Kimmani was a temporary injury replacement for Yves.

Barrett would leave after 4 games and Mekongo Mbala would follow soon after, rescinding his contract in December after only 7 games with averages of 3.4 points and 2.6 rebounds.

Mekong Mbala would then join Luxembourgian club Amicale Steinsel of the Total League midseason in February 2012. At a level of play lower than his previous experiences, including College, he flourished, becoming an instant fit and playing 10 games for an average of 19.10 points and 11.70 rebounds. After his team's final game of the season on May 5, 2012, he left the team, returning to La Salle to pursue a MSc.

== International career ==
Yves Mekongo Mbala was selected to play for the Cameroon national basketball team at the AfroBasket 2009, he played significant minutes to average 6,4 points and 3,1 rebounds as Cameroon lost in the semifinals. They also lost the third-place playoff against Tunisia that would have qualified them for the 2010 FIBA World Championship, he grabbed 8 rebounds and scored 7 free throws but also committed 4 turnovers and missed his 7 shots in the field.

He was again selected by Cameroon for the AfroBasket 2013, playing in all games as a substitute but having little impact with 2,9 points and 3 rebounds on average.

== Personal life ==
In 2003, he participated in the first edition of Basketball Without Borders (Africa 100), a tournament organised by FIBA in conjunction with the NBA that gathered 100 of the continent's best players to take part in games and classes with coaching from African NBA players. He was part of a group of Cameroonian players, the majority from local club Onyx de Yaoundé, that also included future NBA player and international teammate Luc Mbah a Moute.

He later moved to the U.S. around 2004 for both athletic and academic reasons. After a first experience in a school that did not challenge him enough academically he moved to St. Patrick High School in New Jersey, one of the strongest programs in the nation.

== Player profile ==
A Stretch four, his main assets were his athleticism and work ethic and his primary skill rebounding, both defensive and offensive. On defense, he could defend nearly every position on the court through effort and strength. On offense, he was an opportunistic scorer who could score in a variety of ways thanks to his shooting and ball handling skills.
