= 2009–10 Rhode Island Rams men's basketball team =

American college basketball season

2009–10 Rhode Island Rams men's basketball

NIT, Semifinals
- Conference: Atlantic 10 Conference
- Record: 26–10 (9–7 A-10)
- Head coach: Jim Baron
- Assistant coaches: Kevin Clark; Pat Clarke; Momir Gajic
- Home arena: Ryan Center

2009–10 Atlantic 10 men's basketball standings
	Conf.				Overall
Team	W		L	PCT	W		L	PCT
No. 12 Temple†	14	–	2	.875	29	–	6	.829
No. 25 Xavier	14	–	2	.875	26	–	9	.743
No. 24 Richmond	13	–	3	.813	26	–	9	.743
Saint Louis	11	–	5	.688	23	–	13	.639
Rhode Island	9	–	7	.563	26	–	10	.722
Charlotte	9	–	7	.563	19	–	12	.613
Dayton	8	–	8	.500	25	–	12	.676
St. Bonaventure	7	–	9	.438	15	–	16	.484
Duquesne	7	–	9	.438	16	–	16	.500
George Washington	6	–	10	.375	16	–	15	.516
UMass	5	–	11	.313	12	–	20	.375
Saint Joseph's	5	–	11	.313	11	–	20	.355
La Salle	4	–	12	.250	12	–	18	.400
Fordham	0	–	16	.000	2	–	26	.071
† 2010 Atlantic 10 Tournament winner Rankings from AP Poll

The 2009–10 Rhode Island Rams men's basketball team represented the University of Rhode Island in the 2009–10 college basketball season. This was head coach Jim Baron's ninth season at Rhode Island. The Rams competed in the Atlantic 10 Conference and played their home games at the Ryan Center. They finished the season 26–10, 9–7 in A-10 play and lost in the semifinals of the 2010 Atlantic 10 men's basketball tournament. They were invited to the 2010 National Invitation Tournament where they advanced to the semifinals before falling to North Carolina.

== Roster ==
#	Name	Height	Weight (lbs.)	Position	Class	Hometown	Previous Team(s)
1	Stevie Mejia	5'9"	175	G	So.	Boston, Massachusetts, U.S.	Lawrence Academy
2	Ben Eaves	6'7"	225	F	Jr.	Lancashire, England, U.K.	Worcester Academy; UConn
4	Jamal Wilson	6'5"	195	G	So.	Norristown, Pennsylvania, U.S.	Neumann-Goretti HS
5	Marquis Jones	6'1"	200	G	Jr.	South Plainfield, New Jersey, U.S.	St. Thomas More Prep
10	Akeem Richmond	6'1"	180	G	Fr.	Sanford, North Carolina, U.S.	Southern Lee HS
12	Orion Outerbridge	6'9"	210	F	So.	Boston, Massachusetts, U.S.	New Hampton School
15	LaMonte Ulmer	6'6"	215	F	Sr.	New Haven, Connecticut, U.S.	Notre Dame Prep
20	Lisandro Ruiz Moreno	6'0"	180	G	Fr.	Paraná, Entre Ríos, Argentina	South Kent School
21	Delroy James	6'8"	220	F	Jr.	Brooklyn, New York, U.S.	Laurinburg Prep
22	Keith Cothran	6'4"	195	G	Sr.	New Haven, Connecticut, U.S.	The Winchendon School
23	Nikola Malesevic	6'7"	200	F	Fr.	Užice, Serbia	Uzicka Gimnazija
24	Ryan Brooks	6'8"	220	F	Fr.	Mays Landing, New Jersey, U.S.	South Kent School
32	Will Martell	7'0"	245	C	Jr.	Fair Haven, New Jersey, U.S.	Hun School
44	Anthony Malhoit	6'3"	200	G	Jr.	Waterford, Connecticut, U.S.	Piney Woods HS

== Schedule and results ==
Date time, TV	Rank^{#}	Opponent^{#}	Result	Record	Site (attendance) city, state
Regular Season
11/18/2009*; 7:30pm		at Brown	W 78–57	1–0	Pizzitola Sports Center (2,695); Providence, Rhode Island
11/22/2009*; 1:00pm		Holy Cross	W 92–75	2–0	Ryan Center (4,080); Kingston, Rhode Island
11/24/2009*; 7:30pm		Stony Brook	W 75–58	3–0	Ryan Center (4,030); Kingston, Rhode Island
11/28/2009*; 2:00pm		at Davidson	W 75–65	4–0	John M. Belk Arena (3,731); Davidson, North Carolina
12/2/2009*; 7:30pm		at VCU	L 80–82	4–1	Stuart C. Siegel Center (5,229); Richmond, Virginia
12/5/2009*; 1:00pm, Cox Sports		Providence	W 86–82	5–1	Ryan Center (7,675); Kingston, Rhode Island
12/8/2009*; 7:00pm, NESN		Quinnipiac	W 83–74	6–1	Ryan Center (4,061); Kingston, Rhode Island
12/10/2009*; 7:00pm, Cox Sports		Northeastern	W 79–76	7–1	Ryan Center (4,271); Kingston, Rhode Island
12/13/2009*; 6:45pm, NESN		at Boston College	W 80–69	8–1	Conte Forum (4,263); Chestnut Hill, Massachusetts
12/20/2009*; 1:00pm		Fairfield	W 89–84	9–1	Ryan Center (3,114); Kingston, Rhode Island
12/29/2009*; 7:00pm, Cox Sports		at Drexel	W 80–79	10–1	Daskalakis Athletic Center (1,703); Philadelphia, Pennsylvania
1/2/2010*; 2:00pm		vs. Oklahoma State	W 63–59	11–1	Mohegan Sun Arena (7,111); Uncasville, Connecticut
1/5/2010*; 7:00pm		at Akron	W 68–63	12–1	James A. Rhodes Arena (2,429); Akron, Ohio
1/10/2010; 1:00pm, Cox Sports		No. 21 Temple	L 64–68 ^{OT}	12–2 (0–1)	Ryan Center (6,122); Kingston, Rhode Island
1/13/2010; 7:00pm, Cox Sports		Saint Joseph's	W 101–4	13–2 (1–1)	Ryan Center (4,579); Kingston, Rhode Island
1/16/2010; 2:00pm		at Fordham	W 85–67	14–2 (2–1)	Rose Hill Gymnasium (2,354); Bronx, New York
1/20/2010; 7:00pm, Cox Sports		Duquesne	W 75–67	15–2 (3–1)	Ryan Center (5,236); Kingston, Rhode Island
1/23/2010; 6:00pm, Cox Sports		at Xavier	L 61–72	15–3 (3–2)	Cintas Center (10,250); Cincinnati, Ohio
1/26/2010; 7:00pm, Cox Sports		at Dayton	W 65–64	16–3 (4–2)	UD Arena (12,501); Dayton, Ohio
1/30/2010; 1:00pm		George Washington	W 72–66	17–3 (5–2)	Ryan Center (7,280); Kingston, Rhode Island
2/2/2010; 7:00pm		at La Salle	W 90–83	18–3 (6–2)	Tom Gola Arena (1,812); Philadelphia, Pennsylvania
2/6/2010; 2:00pm, Cox Sports		UMass	W 93–85	19–3 (7–2)	Ryan Center (7,579); Kingston, Rhode Island
2/10/2010; 7:00pm, Cox Sports		Richmond	L 67–69	19–4 (7–3)	Ryan Center (7,101); Kingston, Rhode Island
2/13/2010; 4:00pm, Cox Sports		at Temple	L 56–78	19–5 (7–4)	Liacouras Center (7,080); Philadelphia, Pennsylvania
2/17/2010; 9:00pm, Cox Sports		at Saint Louis	L 57–62	19–6 (7–5)	Chaifetz Arena (7,257); St. Louis, Missouri
2/20/2010; 4:00pm		Fordham	W 101–75	20–6 (8–5)	Ryan Center (6,620); Kingston, Rhode Island
2/27/2010; 2:00pm, Cox Sports		at St. Bonaventure	L 74–81	20–7 (8–6)	Reilly Center (3,511); St. Bonaventure, New York
3/3/2010; 7:00pm, Cox Sports		Charlotte	W 80–58	21–7 (9–6)	Ryan Center (6,984); Kingston, Rhode Island
3/6/2010; 4:00pm, Cox Sports		at UMass	L 67–69	21–8 (9–7)	Mullins Center (5,527); Amherst, Massachusetts
Atlantic 10 tournament
3/9/2010; 7:00pm, Cox Sports	(5)	(12) Saint Joseph's; A-10 First Round	W 87–76	22–8	Ryan Center (3,960); Kingston, Rhode Island
3/12/2010; 2:30pm	(5)	vs. (4) Saint Louis; A-10 Quarterfinals	W 63–47	23–8	Boardwalk Hall (5,416); Atlantic City, New Jersey
3/13/2010; 1:00pm, CBSCS	(5)	vs. (1) No. 17 Temple; A-10 Semifinals	L 44–57	23–9	Boardwalk Hall; Atlantic City, New Jersey
NIT
3/17/2010; 7:00pm, ESPNU	(2 VT)	(7 VT) Northwestern; NIT First Round	W 76–64	24–9	Ryan Center (2,734); Kingston, Rhode Island
3/22/2010; 6:00pm, ESPNU	(2 VT)	(6 VT) Nevada; NIT Second Round	W 85–83	25–9	Ryan Center (3,419); Kingston, Rhode Island
3/24/2010; 7:00pm, ESPN2	(2 VT)	at (1 VT) Virginia Tech; NIT Quarterfinals	W 79–72	26–9	Cassell Coliseum (7,055); Blacksburg, Virginia
3/30/2010; 9:00pm, ESPN2	(2 VT)	vs. (4 MS) North Carolina; NIT Semifinals	L 67–68 ^{OT}	26–10	Madison Square Garden (11,689); New York, New York
*Non-conference game. ^{#}Rankings from AP Poll. (#) Tournament seedings in parentheses. MS=NIT Mississippi State bracket. VT=NIT Virginia Tech bracket. All times are in Eastern Time. Source
