= Juan Fernández (basketball, born 1990) =

Argentine basketball player (born 1990)

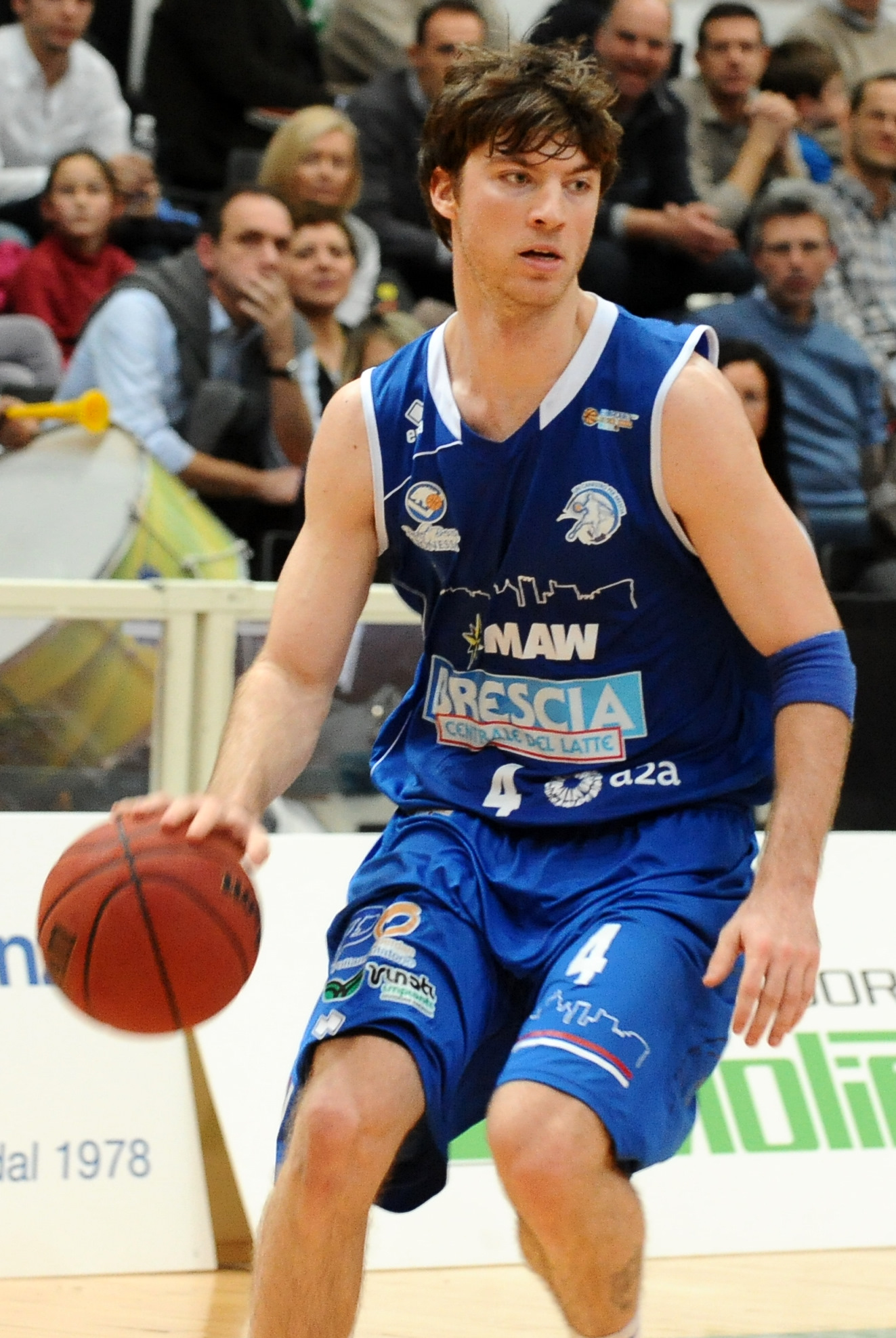
- Fernández playing with Basket Brescia

No. 4 – Luiss Roma
- Position: Point guard
- League: Basket Serie B

Personal information
- Born: July 22, 1990 (age 36) Río Tercero, Córdoba, Argentina
- Listed height: 1.93 m (6 ft 4 in)
- Listed weight: 93 kg (205 lb)

Career information
- High school: Dr. Alexis Carrel
- College: Temple (2008–2012)
- NBA draft: 2012: undrafted
- Playing career: 2012–present

Career history
- 2012–2013: Basket Brescia
- 2013: Dinamo Sassari
- 2014: Obras Sanitarias
- 2014–2016: Basket Brescia
- 2016–2017: CB Breogán
- 2017–2022: Pallacanestro Trieste
- 2024–2025: Reyer Venezia
- 2025-2026: Luiss Roma
Medals
Men's basketball
Representing Argentina
FIBA South American Championship
Gold medal – first place	2012 Argentina
FIBA AmeriCup
Bronze medal – third place	2013 Venezuela

Juan Manuel "Lobito" Fernández (born July 22, 1990) is an Argentine-Italian professional basketball player for Reyer Venezia of the Italian Lega Basket Serie A (LBA). His father, Gustavo, was a point guard for a number of professional basketball teams in Argentina. Pepe Sánchez convinced Fernández to play basketball at his alma mater, Temple University, and Fernández joined the Temple Owls team in December 2008. As a sophomore, he was named Atlantic 10 Tournament Most Valuable Player. After struggling through a prolonged shooting slump as a junior, he hit an off-balance 18-foot shot with .4 seconds remaining to defeat Penn State in the 2011 NCAA Men's Division I Basketball Tournament and was named to the All-Atlantic 10 Third Team. In addition to his college exploits, he defended Argentina bringing home a gold medal at the 2008 Under-18 World Championship.

== Early life ==
Fernández was born on July 22, 1990, in Rio Tercero, Argentina to Gustavo Fernández and Nancy Fiandrino. His father was a point guard for a number of professional basketball teams in Argentina. He earned the nickname "Lobito" (Spanish for "little wolf") after starring on a basketball team with a wolf mascot. Juan Fernández's little brother, also named Gustavo, fell out of a chair when he was a toddler and used a wheelchair for life. He is one of the top wheelchair tennis players in the world under the age of 18. The family operates the Pinot Grigio restaurant in Río Tercero.

At the urging of his father, Juan Fernández began playing basketball when he was six years old. He described himself as a "fat little kid" who was more interested in being a soccer goalie at first. When Fernández showed star potential on junior club teams, he was given the "Lobito" nickname, while his father became known as "Lobo".

As a teenager, Fernández was offered deals to play in the Spanish B and C league when he graduated from Dr. Alexis Carrel High School. At the same time, he was considering playing college basketball in the United States. His mother went to Connecticut for six months to learn English, and she persuaded him that it would be a good place to be a student-athlete. Pepe Sánchez, an Argentine basketball player who played college basketball at Temple University, offered some advice in an e-mail:

"I'm not the kind of guy who preaches about what people should do. But when kids like Juan ask me, I tell them my two greatest experiences in basketball was playing for my college team and my national team – the two times that money wasn't involved. It was about the chance to represent your school and your country. More than that, it just opened my mind to so much. "When I spoke with Juan, it just struck me he was the same and that college was the right situation to him. I told him regardless of what happens in basketball – whether he plays in the NBA, in Europe, whatever – going to college would make the biggest difference in his life."

Sánchez had recommended Fernández to the coach of his alma mater, Fran Dunphy. Dunphy dispatched assistant Matt Langel to recruit Fernández to Temple. On one recruiting trip, Langel drove for 10 hours on the backroads of Argentina searching for Fernández, who was practicing with the national team instead of home in Rio Tercero as Langel had thought. After his official visit to the Philadelphia campus in September 2008, Fernández signed his letter of intent. He graduated high school in December, and enrolled at Temple.

== College career ==
=== Freshman ===
Fernández played college basketball with the Temple Owls men's basketball team. At Temple, Fernández drew immediate comparisons to Sánchez; he was dubbed "Pepe Sánchez with a jump shot." He chose Sánchez's jersey, number 4, but Fernández said this was to honor his father. Unfamiliar with the practice of lifting weights, Fernández wore gloves to his first session, drawing the laughs of his teammates. Against Kent State, Fernández contributed eight points and four assists in his Temple debut, three days after arriving in the United States. He scored a season-high 19 points on February 15, 2009, to power Temple past Duquesne 78–73. The Owls reached the 2009 NCAA tournament after winning the Atlantic 10 tournament title. In 23 games, he averaged 5.5 points and 2.7 assists per game on the basketball court, and earned a 3.0 grade point average in the classroom.

=== Sophomore ===
In his sophomore year, Fernández was moved to shooting guard in the Temple starting lineup, a change that felt strange for him as he was used to playing point guard. He was still in frequent playmaking positions, and led the team in assists with 3.6 per game. He increased his scoring average to 12.6 points per game, second on the team, and led the Atlantic 10 in three-point percentage (45.3%). Fernández scored in double figures in 23 games. On December 13, he netted a career best 33 points to upset local rival and third-ranked Villanova 75–65; he shot 7-for-10 from beyond the arc. This earned him Philadelphia Big Five Player of the Week honors for the week of December 7–14. As a result of his performance against Villanova and his 21 points versus Seton Hall, Fernández was named Atlantic 10 Player of the Week on December 20. In the Fordham game on January 23, 2010, he took a blow to the head and was forced to leave in the second half. He missed the February 2 game against Richmond with post-concussive symptoms.

Fernández became a fan favorite at Temple. Every time he made a three-pointer against Bowling Green, the Temple student section chanted "Ole, ole, ole!" Seton Hall fans were not so kind, mocking him with "Messi, Messi." Little did they realize that Lionel Messi was one of his favorite soccer players, and their comments only served as inspiration. On his return flights to Argentina, strangers frequently went up to Fernández to congratulate him on his recent performances.

Fernández helped Temple to a 29–5 season, capture a share of the Atlantic 10 conference regular season championship with a 14–2 record, and earn a third consecutive Atlantic 10 conference tournament title and an automatic bid to the NCAA tournament. He was named Atlantic 10 Tournament Most Valuable Player after scoring 18 points in the final versus Richmond. In the NCAA Tournament, Temple was seeded fifth and matched up with 12 seed Cornell in the first round. Fernández had 14 points, but his Owls were upset by the Big Red 78–65. Following the season, Fernandez was an All-Atlantic 10 Honorable Mention selection.

=== Junior ===
With the graduation of Luis Guzmán, Fernández switched back to his natural position at point guard in his junior campaign. Fernandez was a preseason All-Atlantic 10 Second Team selection. He was on the watchlist for the Bob Cousy Award honoring the top point guard in college basketball. A shooting slump that lasted the majority of the season saw his field goal percentage drop to 35.5%, his three-point percentage drop to 33.3%, and his scoring average drop to 11.2 points per game. He still led the team in assists, with 3.9 per game. Fernández did miss four games in the middle of the season due to a bone bruise in his knee, but the shooting slump was more devastating and caused him to consult a sports psychologist. One of the worst games of his career was in an Atlantic 10 Tournament loss to Richmond, in which he went 3-for-17 from the field and committed three turnovers. After the game Fran Dunphy convinced Fernández that he had to take less shots and get his teammates involved.

Fernández led Temple to a 26–8 record and a seven seed in the 2011 NCAA Men's Division I Basketball Tournament. In the Round of 64, he hit an off-balance 18-foot shot with .4 seconds to play to defeat Penn State, 66–64, and finished with a season-high 23 points. In the timeout that preceded the shot, teammate Khalif Wyatt convinced coach Dunphy to draw up a play for Fernández, despite his struggles during the season. Fernández finished with 14 points against San Diego State, but the Owls fell in double overtime. He was named to the All-Atlantic 10 Third Team and Academic Team at the conclusion of the regular season and was a Philadelphia Big Five Second Team honoree.

=== Senior ===
Fernández was a preseason All-Atlantic 10 First Team selection as a senior. He was named to the All-Atlantic 10 Third Team and Academic Team at the conclusion of the regular season.

== Professional career ==
Fernández began his professional career in 2012, after signing with the Italian League club Olimpia Milano. At the beginning of the 2012–13 season he was loaned to Centrale del Latte Brescia of the Italian Second Division. In 40 games played in the Italian 2nd Division, he averaged 28.2 minutes, 8.8 points and 4.8 assists per game.

He was then released by Olimpia Milano, and signed with the first division Italian League club Dinamo Sassari.

For the next season he returned to Centrale del Latte Brescia of the Italian Second Division. Posting 12.7 PPG and 5 APG in 23 games of the 2014–15 regular season.

In the 2015–16 season "Lobito" played in 28 games of the regular season, he averaged 23 minutes, 10.6 points and 4.3 assists per game. In the Second Division playoffs he started 16 games, averaged 8.1 points and 4.3 assist per game helping Basket Brescia Leonessa win the finals against Fortitudo Bologna in 5 games and returning to Italian League after 28 years.

In June 2017, Fernandez signed with Pallacanestro Trieste. Fernandez averaged 8.8 points and 3.6 assists per game in 2019–20. On June 17, 2020, he signed a two-year extension.

On July 10, 2024, he signed with Reyer Venezia of the Italian Lega Basket Serie A (LBA).

His agent is Igor Crespo of Xpheres Basketball Management.

In August 2025, Juan signed a new agreement with Luiss Roma Basketball, continuing both his playing career and his work as a Mental Coach within the club's Luiss Sport Lab project. The contract formalizes his dual role, balancing on-court contributions as a member of the Serie B team with his off-court responsibilities in athlete mental performance and well-being. Through this role, Juan supports players across the Luiss Sport Association, drawing from his professional experience and mentorship to help athletes strengthen resilience, clarity, and balance alongside their athletic development. https://sport.luiss.it/basket-serie-a2/

== National junior/senior team careers ==
Fernández defended Argentina at the 2008 Under-18 World Championship. In six U18 matches, he averaged 8.4 points, 3.0 assists, 1.4 steals and 17 minutes per game. In a victory over the United States squad in the World Championship game, he scored 16 points. In the 2009 U19 World Championship, he averaged 8.4 points, 3.6 rebounds, and 3.6 assists per game.

== Personal life ==
Juan met his wife, who also attended Temple University, during his college years. They married in 2013 and have two children. In 2022, during his two-year break from professional basketball, Juan and his wife co-founded TRUEMIND ATHLETE, a mental performance coaching brand focused on athlete well-being and growth.

== Statistics ==
=== NCAA ===
College statistics

Legend
GP	Games played	GS	Games started	MPG	Minutes per game
FG%	Field goal percentage	3P%	3-point field goal percentage	FT%	Free throw percentage
RPG	Rebounds per game	APG	Assists per game	SPG	Steals per game
BPG	Blocks per game	PPG	Points per game	**Bold**	Career high

Year	Team	GP	GS	MPG	FG%	3P%	FT%	RPG	APG	SPG	BPG	PPG
2008–09	Temple Owls	23	0	19.6	.364	.353	.682	1.9	2.7	0.4	0.0	5.5
2009–10	Temple Owls	**34**	30	31.6	**.427**	**.453**	**.847**	2.4	3.6	0.9	0.1	**12.6**
2010–11	Temple Owls	30	29	31.8	.355	.333	.806	**2.9**	**3.9**	0.8	0.1	11.2
2011–12	Temple Owls	32	**32**	**32.3**	.403	.431	.804	2.8	3.8	**1.0**	**0.2**	11.1

== Awards and accomplishments ==
=== College ===
- 2009–10 All-Atlantic 10 Honorable Mention
- 2010 Atlantic 10 tournament MVP
- 2010–11 All-Atlantic 10 Third Team
- 2010–11 All-Atlantic 10 Academic Team
