= 2009–10 Xavier Musketeers men's basketball team =

American college basketball season

2009–10 Xavier Musketeers men's basketball

Atlantic 10 regular season co-champions

NCAA tournament, Sweet Sixteen
- Conference: Atlantic 10 Conference

Ranking
- Coaches: No. 14
- AP: No. 25
- Record: 26–9 (14–2 A-10)
- Head coach: Chris Mack (1st season)
- Assistant coaches: Pat Kelsey; Orlando Ranson; Travis Steele
- Home arena: Cintas Center

2009–10 Atlantic 10 men's basketball standings
	Conf.				Overall
Team	W		L	PCT	W		L	PCT
No. 12 Temple†	14	–	2	.875	29	–	6	.829
No. 25 Xavier	14	–	2	.875	26	–	9	.743
No. 24 Richmond	13	–	3	.813	26	–	9	.743
Saint Louis	11	–	5	.688	23	–	13	.639
Rhode Island	9	–	7	.563	26	–	10	.722
Charlotte	9	–	7	.563	19	–	12	.613
Dayton	8	–	8	.500	25	–	12	.676
St. Bonaventure	7	–	9	.438	15	–	16	.484
Duquesne	7	–	9	.438	16	–	16	.500
George Washington	6	–	10	.375	16	–	15	.516
UMass	5	–	11	.313	12	–	20	.375
Saint Joseph's	5	–	11	.313	11	–	20	.355
La Salle	4	–	12	.250	12	–	18	.400
Fordham	0	–	16	.000	2	–	26	.071
† 2010 Atlantic 10 Tournament winner Rankings from AP Poll

The 2009–10 Xavier Musketeers men's basketball team represented Xavier University in the 2009–10 college basketball season. This was head coach Chris Mack's first season at Xavier. The Musketeers competed in the Atlantic 10 Conference and played their home games at the Cintas Center. Xavier finished the season with a record of 26–9; 14–2 in A-10 play to capture a share of the regular season championship with Temple. The Musketeers lost in the semifinals of the 2010 Atlantic 10 men's basketball tournament to Richmond. Xavier received an at-large bid to the NCAA tournament, as a #6 seed. They defeated Minnesota and Pittsburgh to advance to the Sweet Sixteen. In the Sweet Sixteen, they fell to Kansas State in double overtime.

== Previous season ==
The Musketeers finished the 2008–09 season with a record of 26–9, 14–2 win the A-10 regular season championship. The Musketeers lost to Saint Joseph's in the A-10 tournament. Xavier received a #4 seed in the NCAA tournament where they advanced to the Sweet Sixteen before losing to Pittsburgh.

== Roster ==
#	Name	Height	Weight (lbs.)	Position	Class	Hometown	Previous Team(s)
3	Brian Walsh	6'4"	195	G/F	Fr.	Coraopolis, Pennsylvania, U.S.	Moon HS
10	Mark Lyons	6'1"	195	G	Fr.	Schenectady, New York, U.S.	Brewster Academy
12	Brad Redford	6'0"	175	G	So.	Frankenmuth, Michigan, U.S.	Frankenmuth HS
13	Kevin Feeney	6'3"	170	G	Jr.	Monticello, Illinois, U.S.	Monticello HS
14	Johnny Mazza	6'0"	160	G	Jr.	Cincinnati, Ohio, U.S.	St. Xavier HS
15	Andrew Taylor	6'8"	215	F	Jr.	Toledo, Ohio, U.S.	St. John's Jesuit HS
21	Jeff Robinson	6'9"	200	F	Fr.	Indianapolis, Indiana, U.S.	Lawrence HS
22	Jamel McLean	6'8"	235	F	Jr.	Hampton, Virginia, U.S.	Bethel HS
25	Danté Jackson	6'5"	195	G	Jr.	Greenfield, Ohio, U.S.	McClain HS
31	Jason Love	6'9"	265	F/C	Sr.	Philadelphia, Pennsylvania, U.S.	Abington Friends School
32	Kenny Frease	7'0"	265	C	So.	Massillon, Ohio, U.S.	Perry HS
33	Joe Hughes	6'6"	205	F	Jr.	Indianapolis, Indiana, U.S.	Cathedral HS
52	Terrell Holloway	6'0"	185	G	So.	Hempstead, New York, U.S.	Harmony Community School
55	Jordan Crawford	6'4"	195	G	So.	Detroit, Michigan, U.S.	Communication & Media Arts HS

== Schedule and results ==
Date time, TV	Rank^{#}	Opponent^{#}	Result	Record	Site (attendance) city, state
Exhibition
11/3/2009*; 7:30 pm		Rollins	W 86–47	—	Cintas Center (9,349); Cincinnati, Ohio
11/7/2009*; 7:30 pm		Northern Kentucky	W 83–66	—	Cintas Center (9,574); Cincinnati, Ohio
Regular season
11/13/2009*; 7:30 pm, FS Ohio		Youngstown State	W 83–57	1–0	Cintas Center (10,136); Cincinnati, Ohio
11/17/2009*; 7:30 pm, FS Ohio		Bowling Green	W 101–57	2–0	Cintas Center (10,067); Cincinnati, Ohio
11/21/2009*; 7:30 pm		Sacred Heart	W 105–65	3–0	Cintas Center (9,753); Cincinnati, Ohio
11/26/2009*; 2:30 pm, ESPN2		vs. Marquette; Old Spice Classic	L 61–71	3–1	Milk House (2,853); Lake Buena Vista, Florida
11/27/2009*; 2:30 pm, ESPNU		vs. Creighton; Old Spice Classic	W 80–67	4–1	Milk House (3,660); Lake Buena Vista, Florida
11/29/2009*; 12:30 pm, ESPNU		vs. Baylor; Old Spice Classic	L 64–69	4–2	Milk House (1,846); Lake Buena Vista, Florida
12/4/2009*; 7:30 pm, FS Ohio		Kent State	W 77–61	5–2	Cintas Center (9,896); Cincinnati, Ohio
12/8/2009*; 9:00 pm, ESPNU		at Kansas State	L 56–71	5–3	Bramlage Coliseum (12,528); Manhattan, Kansas
12/13/2009*; 7:00 pm, ESPNU		No. 19 Cincinnati; Crosstown Shootout	W 83–79 ^{2OT}	6–3	Cintas Center (10,250); Cincinnati, Ohio
12/19/2009*; 2:00 pm, ESPN2		at No. 21 Butler	L 68–69	6–4	Hinkle Fieldhouse (9,114); Indianapolis, Indiana
12/23/2009*; 7:00 pm, FS Ohio		Miami (OH)	W 70–67	7–4	Cintas Center (10,250); Cincinnati, Ohio
12/28/2009*; 7:00 pm, ESPNU		LSU	W 89–65	8–4	Cintas Center (10,250); Cincinnati, Ohio
1/3/2010*; 5:30 pm, FSN		at Wake Forest	L 92–96 ^{2OT}	8–5	LJVM Coliseum (14,148); Winston-Salem, North Carolina
1/7/2010; 7:00 pm, CBSCS		at La Salle	W 68–62	9–5 (1–0)	Tom Gola Arena (2,041); Philadelphia, Pennsylvania
1/10/2010; 12:00 pm, FS Ohio		at George Washington	W 76–69	10–5 (2–0)	Charles E. Smith Center (3,002); Washington, D.C.
1/13/2010; 7:30 pm, FS Ohio		Charlotte	W 86–74	11–5 (3–0)	Cintas Center (10,137); Cincinnati, Ohio
1/16/2010; 11:00 am, ESPN2		Dayton	W 78–75	12–5 (4–0)	Cintas Center (10,250); Cincinnati, Ohio
1/20/2010; 7:00 pm, FS Ohio		at No. 16 Temple	L 72–77	12–6 (4–1)	Liacouras Center (6,813); Philadelphia, Pennsylvania
1/23/2010; 6:00 pm, FS Ohio		Rhode Island	W 72–61	13–6 (5–1)	Cintas Center (10,250); Cincinnati, Ohio
1/28/2010; 7:00 pm, CBSCS		Duquesne	W 86–50	14–6 (6–1)	Cintas Center (10,250); Cincinnati, Ohio
1/31/2010; 2:00 pm, FS Ohio		Fordham	W 108–60	15–6 (7–1)	Cintas Center (10,058); Cincinnati, Ohio
2/3/2010; 7:00 pm, FS Ohio		at UMass	W 87–79	16–6 (8–1)	Mullins Center (3,538); Amherst, Massachusetts
2/6/2010; 12:00 pm, ESPN2		at Dayton	L 65–90	16–7 (8–2)	UD Arena (13,435); Dayton, Ohio
2/13/2010*; 6:00 pm, ESPN		at Florida	W 76–64	17–7	Stephen C. O'Connell Center (12,113); Gainesville, Florida
2/17/2010; 7:30 pm, FS Ohio		Saint Joseph's	W 88–52	18–7 (9–2)	Cintas Center (10,015); Cincinnati, Ohio
2/20/2010; 2:00 pm, FS Ohio		at Charlotte	W 81–67	19–7 (10–2)	Dale F. Halton Arena (9,105); Charlotte, North Carolina
2/24/2010; 8:00 pm, FS Ohio		at Saint Louis	W 73–71	20–7 (11–2)	Chaifetz Arena (10,008); St. Louis, Missouri
2/28/2010; 1:00 pm, ESPN2		No. 23 Richmond	W 78–76 ^{2OT}	21–7 (12–2)	Cintas Center (10,250); Cincinnati, Ohio
3/3/2010; 7:00 pm, FS Ohio	No. 25	at Fordham	W 82–56	22–7 (13–2)	Rose Hill Gymnasium (2,298); Bronx, New York
3/6/2010; 4:00 pm, FS Ohio	No. 25	St. Bonaventure	W 93–72	23–7 (14–2)	Cintas Center (10,031); Cincinnati, Ohio
Atlantic 10 tournament
3/12/2010; 6:30 pm	(2) No. 24	vs. (7) Dayton; A-10 Quarterfinals	W 78–73	24–7	Boardwalk Hall; Atlantic City, New Jersey
3/13/2010; 3:30 pm, CBSCS	(2) No. 24	vs. (3) Richmond; A-10 Semifinals	L 85–89 ^{OT}	24–8	Boardwalk Hall (8,208); Atlantic City, New Jersey
NCAA tournament
3/19/2010*; 12:25 pm, CBS	(6 W) No. 25	vs. (11 W) Minnesota; NCAA First Round	W 65–54	25–8	Bradley Center (17,847); Milwaukee, Wisconsin
3/21/2010*; 4:50pm, CBS	(6 W) No. 25	vs. (3 W) No. 18 Pittsburgh; NCAA Second Round	W 71–68	26–8	Bradley Center (18,031); Milwaukee, Wisconsin
3/25/2010*; 9:37pm, CBS	(6 W) No. 25	vs. (2 W) No. 7 Kansas State; NCAA Sweet Sixteen	L 96–101 ^{2OT}	26–9	EnergySolutions Arena (17,254); Salt Lake City, Utah
*Non-conference game. ^{#}Rankings from AP Poll. (#) Tournament seedings in parentheses. W=West Region. All times are in Eastern Time. Source
