= 2009–10 Richmond Spiders men's basketball team =

American college basketball season

2009–10 Richmond Spiders men's basketball

South Padre Island Invitational Champions

NCAA tournament, Round of 64
- Conference: Atlantic 10 Conference

Ranking
- AP: No. 24
- Record: 26–9 (13–3 A-10)
- Head coach: Chris Mooney (5th season)
- Assistant coaches: Kevin McGeehan (5th season); Jamal Brunt (3rd season); Rob Jones (2nd season)
- Home arena: Robins Center

2009–10 Atlantic 10 men's basketball standings
	Conf.				Overall
Team	W		L	PCT	W		L	PCT
No. 12 Temple†	14	–	2	.875	29	–	6	.829
No. 25 Xavier	14	–	2	.875	26	–	9	.743
No. 24 Richmond	13	–	3	.813	26	–	9	.743
Saint Louis	11	–	5	.688	23	–	13	.639
Rhode Island	9	–	7	.563	26	–	10	.722
Charlotte	9	–	7	.563	19	–	12	.613
Dayton	8	–	8	.500	25	–	12	.676
St. Bonaventure	7	–	9	.438	15	–	16	.484
Duquesne	7	–	9	.438	16	–	16	.500
George Washington	6	–	10	.375	16	–	15	.516
UMass	5	–	11	.313	12	–	20	.375
Saint Joseph's	5	–	11	.313	11	–	20	.355
La Salle	4	–	12	.250	12	–	18	.400
Fordham	0	–	16	.000	2	–	26	.071
† 2010 Atlantic 10 Tournament winner Rankings from AP Poll

The 2009–10 Richmond Spiders men's basketball team represented the University of Richmond in National Collegiate Athletic Association (NCAA) Division I college basketball during the 2009–10 season. Richmond competed as a member of the Atlantic 10 Conference (A-10) under fifth-year head basketball coach Chris Mooney and played its home games at the Robins Center.

Coming off a 20–16 performance in the 2008–09 season that saw the Spiders advance to the semifinals of the 2009 College Basketball Invitational, the Spiders were picked third in the Atlantic-10 preseason poll. Point guard Kevin Anderson was named to the Preseason All-Atlantic 10 First Team, with guard David Gonzalvez being named to the Second Team and center Dan Geriot to the Third Team.

Following the end of the regular season, Anderson was named Atlantic 10 Player of the Year, while Gonzalvez was named to both the All-Atlantic 10 Second Team and Defensive Team.

With its 26th win of the season coming in the semifinals of the Atlantic 10 tournament against Xavier, Richmond tied a school record for number of wins in a season.

After finishing in third place in the Atlantic 10 during the regular season, Richmond advanced to the finals of the conference tournament before falling to Temple. Richmond was awarded an at-large bid to the 2010 NCAA Division I men's basketball tournament. As the seventh seed in the tournament's South region, Richmond earned the highest seeding in its history. They lost in the first round to ten seed Saint Mary's to end their season.

== Preseason ==
=== Recruiting ===
College recruiting information
Name	Hometown	School	Height	Weight	Commit date
Darien Brothers; G	Richmond, VA	Benedictine HS	6 ft 3 in (1.91 m)	185 lb (84 kg)	Aug 6, 2008
Darien Brothers; G	Recruit ratings: Scout: Rivals: (85)				
Greg Robbins; F/G	Wynnewood, PA	Lower Merion HS	6 ft 5 in (1.96 m)	195 lb (88 kg)	Aug 8, 2008
Greg Robbins; F/G	Recruit ratings: Scout: Rivals: (73)				
Overall recruit ranking: Scout: NR Rivals: NR ESPN: NR
Note: In many cases, Scout, Rivals, 247Sports, On3, and ESPN may conflict in their listings of height and weight.; In these cases, the average was taken. ESPN grades are on a 100-point scale.; Sources: "Rivals.com 2009 Richmond Commitments". Rivals.; "Scout.com 2009 Richmond Commitments". Scout.; "ESPN 2009 Richmond Commitments". ESPN.; "Scout.com Team Recruiting Rankings". Scout.; "2009 Team Ranking". Rivals.

== Roster ==
2009–10 Richmond Spiders men's basketball team
Players
Coaches

Pos.	#	Name	Height	Weight	Year	Hometown
F	1	Darrius Garrett	6 ft 9 in (2.06 m)	210 lb (95 kg)	So	Raleigh, North Carolina
G	3	Darien Brothers	6 ft 3 in (1.91 m)	195 lb (88 kg)	Fr	Richmond, Virginia
G	5	David Gonzalvez	6 ft 4 in (1.93 m)	205 lb (93 kg)	Sr	Marietta, Georgia
G	10	Jonathan Benjamin	5 ft 11 in (1.8 m)	160 lb (73 kg)	Fr	Rochester, New York
F/C	11	Josh Duinker	6 ft 11 in (2.11 m)	230 lb (104 kg)	RS So	Sydney, Australia
F	12	Kevin Smith	6 ft 5 in (1.96 m)	200 lb (91 kg)	Jr	Murfreesboro, Tennessee
G/F	13	Zak Estes	6 ft 4 in (1.93 m)	200 lb (91 kg)	So	Indianapolis, Indiana
G	14	Kevin Anderson	6 ft 0 in (1.83 m)	175 lb (79 kg)	Jr	Atlanta, Georgia
F	15	Francis-Cedric Martel	6 ft 6 in (1.98 m)	205 lb (93 kg)	So	Montreal, Canada
G/F	21	Kevin Hovde (injured)	6 ft 6 in (1.98 m)	215 lb (98 kg)	Sr	Kennett Square, Pennsylvania
G/F	22	Greg Robbins	6 ft 5 in (1.96 m)	215 lb (98 kg)	Fr	Wynnewood, Pennsylvania
G	24	Liam Billings	6 ft 4 in (1.93 m)	195 lb (88 kg)	So	Winter Park, Florida
F	31	Conor Smith	6 ft 9 in (2.06 m)	225 lb (102 kg)	RS So	Brookfield, Wisconsin
F	32	Justin Harper	6 ft 10 in (2.08 m)	225 lb (102 kg)	Jr	Richmond, Virginia
C	41	Dan Geriot	6 ft 9 in (2.06 m)	255 lb (116 kg)	RS Jr	Springfield, Pennsylvania
G/F	44	Ryan Butler	6 ft 7 in (2.01 m)	210 lb (95 kg)	RS Sr	Richmond, Virginia

Head coach

- Chris Mooney (Princeton)

Assistant coach(es)

- Kevin McGeehan (Gettysburg)
- Jamal Brunt (Randolph-Macon)
- Rob Jones (Toccoa Falls)

Legend

- (C) Team captain
- (S) Suspended
- (I) Ineligible
- (W) Walk-on
- Injured
- Current redshirt

Roster
Last update: 2009-11-19

== Schedule ==
Date time, TV	Rank^{#}	Opponent^{#}	Result	Record	Site (attendance) city, state
Regular Season
November 13*; 7:00 pm		Lehigh	W 65–53	1–0	Robins Center (4,139); Richmond, Virginia
November 16*; 7:00 pm		VMI	W 103–59	2–0	Robins Center (3,802); Richmond, Virginia
November 19*; 7:00 pm		at William & Mary	L 71–78	2–1	Kaplan Arena (2,104); Williamsburg, Virginia
November 22*; 5:00 pm		Chattanooga; South Padre Island Invitational	W 75–49	3–1	Robins Center (3,185); Richmond, Virginia
November 24*; 7:00 pm		Longwood; South Padre Island Invitational	W 65–52	4–1	Robins Center (3,338); Richmond, Virginia
November 27*; 6:00 pm, Fox College Sports		vs. Mississippi State; South Padre Island Invitational	W 63–62	5–1	South Padre Island Convention Centre (585); South Padre Island, Texas
November 28*; 8:00 pm, Fox College Sports		vs. Missouri; South Padre Island Invitational	W 59–52	6–1	South Padre Island Convention Centre (543); South Padre Island, Texas
December 2*; 7:00 pm		Old Dominion	W 67–60	7–1	Robins Center (4,130); Richmond, Virginia
December 12*; 7:30 pm		at VCU; Black & Blue Classic	L 57–65	7–2	Siegel Center (7,567); Richmond, Virginia
December 16*; 7:00 pm, SportSouth		at South Carolina	L 58–76	7–3	Colonial Life Arena (9,640); Columbia, South Carolina
December 19*; 6:30 pm, Sun Sports		vs. No. 13 Florida; Orange Bowl Basketball Classic	W 56–53	8–3	BankAtlantic Center (13,258); Sunrise, Florida
December 22*; 12:00 pm		UNC Greensboro	W 89–63	9–3	Robins Center (3,127); Richmond, Virginia
December 28*; 7:00 pm		UNC Wilmington	W 66–64	10–3	Robins Center (4,027); Richmond, Virginia
December 31*; 7:00 pm, ESPNU		at Wake Forest	L 68–74 ^{OT}	10–4	LJVM Coliseum (10,210); Winston-Salem, North Carolina
January 2*; 2:00 pm		at Bucknell	W 59–50	11–4	Sojka Pavilion (2,322); Lewisburg, Pennsylvania
January 6; 7:00 pm		at Duquesne	W 80–68	12–4 (1–0)	A. J. Palumbo Center (2,523); Pittsburgh, Pennsylvania
January 9; 5:00 pm		at Saint Louis	L 58–63	12–5 (1–1)	Chaifetz Arena (8,134); St. Louis, Missouri
January 13; 7:00 pm		UMass	W 70–63 ^{OT}	13–5 (2–1)	Robins Center (4,019); Richmond, Virginia
January 16; 4:00 pm, CBS College Sports		La Salle	W 67–63	14–5 (3–1)	Robins Center (4,641); Richmond, Virginia
January 20; 7:00 pm		Charlotte	L 59–71	14–6 (3–2)	Robins Center (4,042); Richmond, Virginia
January 23; 2:00 pm		at George Washington	W 62–57	15–6 (4–2)	Smith Center (3,298); Washington, D.C.
January 30; 2:00 pm, CBS College Sports		Saint Louis	W 62–36	16–6 (5–2)	Robins Center (3,193); Richmond, Virginia
February 3; 7:00 pm		at Saint Joseph's	W 68–58	17–6 (6–2)	Hagan Arena (3,886); Philadelphia, Pennsylvania
February 6; 2:00 pm, ESPNU		No. 19 Temple	W 71–54	18–6 (7–2)	Robins Center (6,806); Richmond, Virginia
February 10; 7:00 pm		at Rhode Island	W 69–67	19–6 (8–2)	Ryan Center (7,109); Kingston, Rhode Island
February 13; 2:00 pm, CBS College Sports		at St. Bonaventure	W 68–49	20–6 (9–2)	Reilly Center (5,013); St. Bonaventure, New York
February 17; 7:00 pm	No. 25	Fordham	W 84–56	21–6 (10–2)	Robins Center (4,834); Richmond, Virginia
February 20; 7:00 pm	No. 25	George Washington	W 74–70	22–6 (11–2)	Robins Center (9,025); Richmond, Virginia
February 28; 1:00 pm, ESPN2	No. 23	at Xavier	L 76–78 ^{2OT}	22–7 (11–3)	Cintas Center (10,250); Cincinnati, Ohio
March 4; 7:00 pm, CBS College Sports		Dayton	W 60–56	23–7 (12–3)	Robins Center (7,121); Richmond, Virginia
March 6; 2:00 pm		at Charlotte	W 89–84 ^{OT}	24–7 (13–3)	Halton Arena (6,559); Charlotte, North Carolina
Atlantic 10 tournament
March 12; 9:00 pm, CBS College Sports	(3)	vs. (11) UMass; A-10 Quarterfinal	W 77–72	25–7	Boardwalk Hall (6,027); Atlantic City, New Jersey
March 13; 3:30 pm, CBS College Sports	(3)	vs. (2) No. 24 Xavier; A-10 Semifinal	W 89–85 ^{OT}	26–7	Boardwalk Hall (8,208); Atlantic City, New Jersey
March 14; 1:00 pm, CBS	(3)	vs. (1) No. 17 Temple; A-10 Championship Game	L 52–56	26–8	Boardwalk Hall (7,882); Atlantic City, New Jersey
NCAA tournament
March 18*; 2:50 pm, CBS	(7 S) No. 24	vs. (10 S) Saint Mary's; NCAA First Round	L 71–80	26–9	Dunkin' Donuts Center (11,106); Providence, RI
*Non-conference game. ^{#}Rankings from AP Poll. (#) Tournament seedings in parentheses. S=NCAA South Regional. All times are in Eastern Time. Source
