= 2009–10 Atlantic 10 Conference men's basketball season =

- League: NCAA Division I
- Sport: Basketball
- Duration: January 6, 2010 through March 4, 2010
- Teams: 14
- TV partner: CBS College Sports Network

Regular Season

Tournament

Basketball seasons
- ← 08–09 10–11 →

2009–10 Atlantic 10 men's basketball standings
	Conf.				Overall
Team	W		L	PCT	W		L	PCT
No. 12 Temple†	14	–	2	.875	29	–	6	.829
No. 25 Xavier	14	–	2	.875	26	–	9	.743
No. 24 Richmond	13	–	3	.813	26	–	9	.743
Saint Louis	11	–	5	.688	23	–	13	.639
Rhode Island	9	–	7	.563	26	–	10	.722
Charlotte	9	–	7	.563	19	–	12	.613
Dayton	8	–	8	.500	25	–	12	.676
St. Bonaventure	7	–	9	.438	15	–	16	.484
Duquesne	7	–	9	.438	16	–	16	.500
George Washington	6	–	10	.375	16	–	15	.516
UMass	5	–	11	.313	12	–	20	.375
Saint Joseph's	5	–	11	.313	11	–	20	.355
La Salle	4	–	12	.250	12	–	18	.400
Fordham	0	–	16	.000	2	–	26	.071
† 2010 Atlantic 10 Tournament winner Rankings from AP Poll

The 2009–10 Atlantic 10 Conference men's basketball season marks the 34th season of Atlantic 10 Conference basketball.

== Preseason ==
In the preseason, talk centered around the University of Dayton, who returned four starters from a 27–8 team that advanced to the second round of the 2009 NCAA tournament. Dayton forward Chris Wright was named to the John R. Wooden Award preseason top 50 candidate list on August 19, the only Atlantic 10 player so honored. Wright also was named to the Naismith Award watch list on October 29. In other preseason recognition, Jason Duty of Duquesne and Yves Mekongo of La Salle were named to the 30-man preseason candidate list for the Lowe's Senior CLASS Award.

In a vote of league coaches and media, Dayton was named the preseason favorite to win the league. Dayton also received national recognition as the Flyers were ranked in both preseason polls – #21 in the AP Poll and #22 in the ESPN/USA Today Coaches' poll.

=== Atlantic 10 Preseason Poll ===
Rank	Team
1	Dayton (33)
2	Xavier (18)
3	Richmond (4)
4	La Salle (2)
5	Duquesne
5	Temple
7	Charlotte
8	Rhode Island
9	Massachusetts
10	Saint Joseph's
11	St. Bonaventure
12	Saint Louis
13	George Washington
14	Fordham

=== Preseason All-A10 Team ===
First Team

- Lavoy Allen, Temple
- Kevin Anderson, Richmond
- Rodney Green, La Salle
- Ricky Harris, Massachusetts
- Chris Wright, Dayton

Second Team

- David Gonzalvez, Richmond
- DiJuan Harris, Charlotte
- Andrew Nicholson, St. Bonaventure
- Marcus Johnson, Dayton
- Damian Saunders, Duquesne

Third Team

- Bill Clark, Duquesne
- Keith Cothran, Rhode Island
- Jordan Crawford, Xavier
- Dan Geriot, Richmond
- Kwamain Mitchell, Saint Louis

=== Preseason A10 All-Defensive Team ===
- Dante’ Jackson, Xavier
- Jason Love, Xavier
- Andrew Nicholson, St. Bonaventure
- London Warren, Dayton
- Garrett Williamson, Saint Joseph’s

=== Preseason A10 All-Rookie Team ===
- Shamarr Bowden, Charlotte
- Chris Gaston, Fordham
- Aaric Murray, La Salle
- Freddie Riley, Massachusetts
- Terrell Vinson, Massachusetts

== Postseason ==
=== Atlantic 10 tournament ===
Beginning this season, the Atlantic 10 men's basketball tournament changed formats so that first-round games would be played on the home court of the higher-seeded team, then the tournament would move to Boardwalk Hall in Atlantic City. In 2009, all rounds were held at the same site.

== Conference awards & honors ==
=== Weekly awards ===
Atlantic 10 Players of the Week
Throughout the conference season, the Atlantic 10 offices name a player and rookie of the week.

Week	Player of the week	Rookie of the week
November 15	Damian Saunders, Duquesne	Shamarr Bowden, Charlotte
November 15	Chris Wright, Dayton	Aaric Murray, LaSalle
November 22	Jordan Crawford, Xavier	Carl Jones, Saint Joseph's
November 22	Damian Saunders, Duquesne	Lasan Kromah, George Washington
November 29	Andrew Nicholson, St. Bonaventure	Akeem Richmond, Rhode Island
November 29	Shamari Spears, Charlotte	Akeem Richmond, Rhode Island
December 6	Ricky Harris, Massachusetts	Chris Braswell, Charlotte
December 6	Damian Hollis, George Washington	Chris Braswell, Charlotte
December 13	Keith Cothran, Rhode Island	Chris Gaston, Fordham
December 20	Juan Fernandez, Temple	Terrell Vinson, Massachusetts
December 27	Kwamian Mitchell, Saint Louis	Carl Baptiste, Saint Joseph's
December 27	Kwamian Mitchell, Saint Louis	Mark Lyons, Xavier
January 3	Kevin Anderson, Richmond	Chris Braswell, Charlotte
January 3	Derrio Green, Charlotte	Chris Gaston, Fordham
January 10	Jordan Crawford, Xavier	Lasan Kromah, George Washington
January 10	Chris Johnson, Dayton	Lasan Kromah, George Washington
January 17	Ryan Brooks, Temple	Aaric Murray, LaSalle
January 24	Andrew Nicholson, St. Bonaventure	Chris Braswell, Charlotte
January 31	Derrio Green, Charlotte	Chris Gaston, Fordham
January 31	Derrio Green, Charlotte	Aaric Murray, LaSalle
February 7	Kwamian Mitchell, Saint Louis	Chris Gaston, Fordham
February 7	Shamari Spears, Charlotte	Chris Gaston, Fordham
February 14	Ricky Harris, Massachusetts	Dwayne Smith, George Washington
February 14	Jason Love, Xavier	Dwayne Smith, George Washington
February 21	Kevin Anderson, Richmond	Lasan Kromah, George Washington
February 21	Bill Clark, Duquesne	Akeem Richmond, Rhode Island
February 28	Jordan Crawford, Xavier	Cody Ellis, Saint Louis
February 28	Jonathan Hall, St. Bonaventure	Cody Ellis, Saint Louis
March 7	Lavoy Allen, Temple	Carl Jones, Saint Joseph's
March 7	Ricky Harris, Massachusetts	Carl Jones, Saint Joseph's

=== All-Conference Awards ===
- Player of the Year: Kevin Anderson, Richmond
- Rookie of the Year: Chris Gaston, Fordham
- Defensive Player of the Year: Damian Saunders, Duquesne
- Chris Daniels Most Improved Player of the Year: Chris Johnson, Dayton
- Sixth Man of the Year: Ramone Moore, Temple
- Student-Athlete of the Year: Yves Mekongo, La Salle
- Coach of the Year: Fran Dunphy, Temple

==== Atlantic 10 Men's Basketball All-Conference Teams ====
First Team

- Kevin Anderson, Richmond
- Lavoy Allen, Temple
- Jordan Crawford, Xavier
- Damian Saunders, Duquesne
- Chris Wright, Dayton

Second Team

- Ryan Brooks, Temple
- David Gonzalvez, Richmond
- Rodney Green, La Salle
- Kwamain Mitchell, Saint Louis
- Andrew Nicholson, St. Bonaventure

Third Team

- Keith Cothran, Rhode Island
- Ricky Harris, Massachusetts
- Delroy James, Rhode Island
- Jason Love, Xavier
- Shamari Spears, Charlotte

Honorable Mention

- Juan Fernandez, Temple
- Damian Hollis, George Washington
- Willie Reed, Saint Louis

Rookie Team

- Chris Braswell, Charlotte
- Cody Ellis, Saint Louis
- Chris Gaston, Fordham
- Lasan Kromah, George Washington
- Aaric Murray, La Salle
- Akeem Richmond, Rhode Island

Defensive Team

- Lavoy Allen, Temple
- David Gonzalvez, Richmond
- Damian Saunders, Duquesne
- London Warren, Dayton
- Garrett Williamson, Saint Joseph’s

Academic Team

- Brian Conklin, Saint Louis
- Jason Duty, Duquesne
- Kurt Huelsman, Dayton
- Will Martell, Rhode Island
- Yves Mekongo, La Salle

== Rankings ==
2009–10 Atlantic 10 Conference Weekly Rankings Key: ██ Increase in ranking. ██ Decrease in ranking. RV = Received Votes
AP Poll	Pre	Wk 1	Wk 2	Wk 3	Wk 4	Wk 5	Wk 6	Wk 7	Wk 8	Wk 9	Wk 10	Wk 11	Wk 12	Wk 13	Wk 14	Wk 15	Wk 16	Wk 17	Wk 18
Charlotte					37	38	37						36	30					
Dayton	21	18	37	42	45	36	34	28	34	31									
Duquesne																			
Fordham																			
George Washington																			
La Salle																			
Massachusetts																			
Rhode Island						49	53	49	32		37		32	32					
Richmond					39		51		37					41	25	23	27	27	24
Saint Louis																			
St. Bonaventure																			
St. Joseph's																			
Temple			47			30	21	18	21	19	16	15	19	21	21	20	20	17	12
Xavier	37	35	31								44	37	30		35	31	25	24	25
