= Río Tercero, Córdoba =

Río Tercero
- City
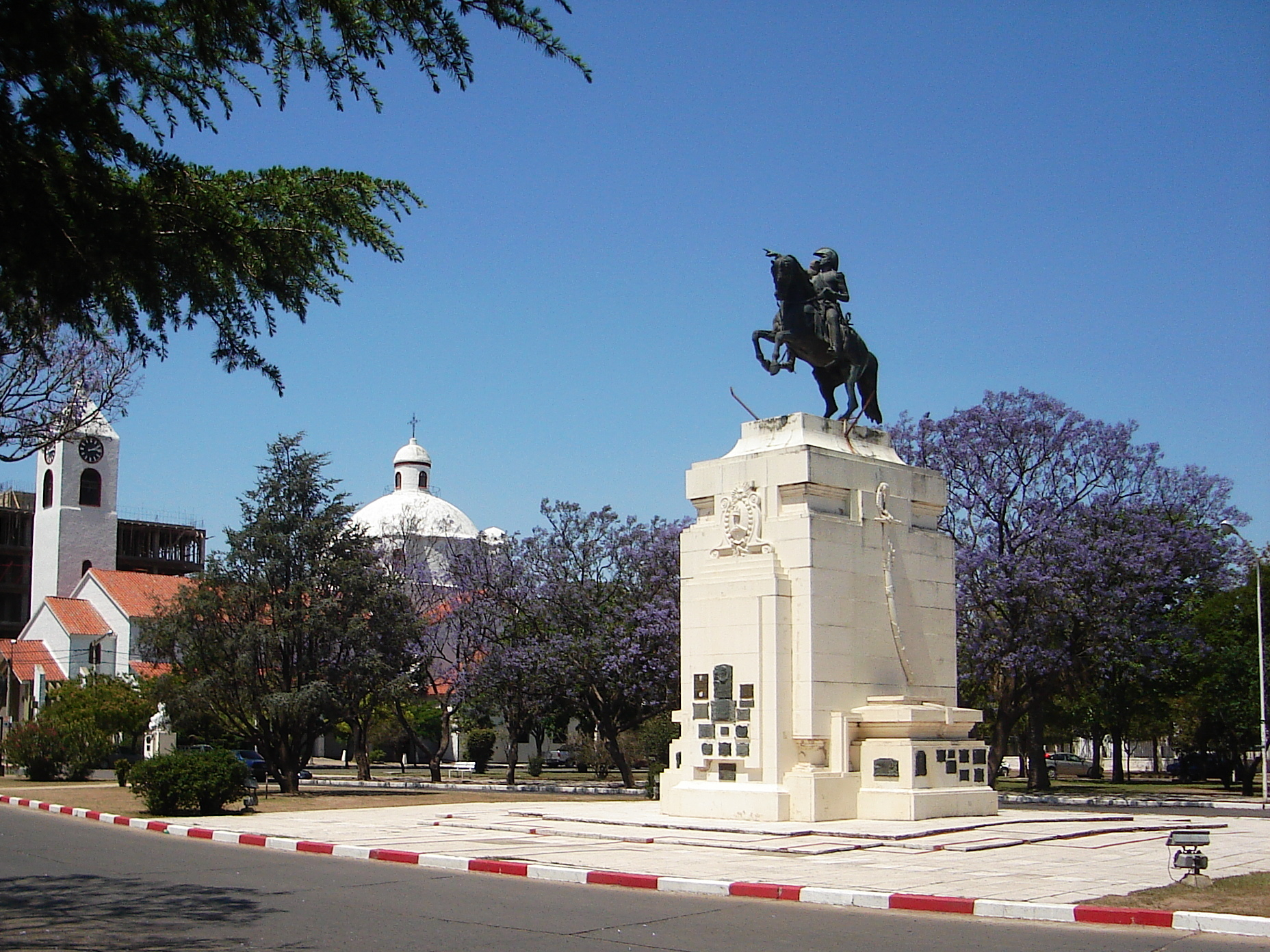

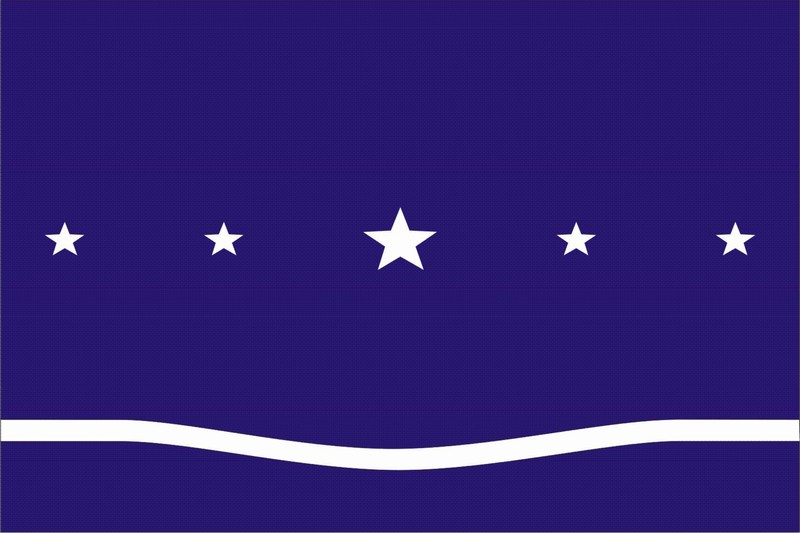
- Flag

- Location of Río Tercero in Argentina
- Coordinates: 32°11′S 64°06′W
- Country: Argentina
- Province: Córdoba
- Department: Tercero Arriba

Government
  - Intendant: Marcos Ferrer (UCR)
- Elevation: 386 m (1,266 ft)

Population (2022 census)
  - Total: 53,166
- Time zone: UTC−3 (ART)
- CPA base: X5850
- Dialing code: +54 3571
- Website: Official website

Río Tercero is a city in the center of Argentina, 96 km from Córdoba city, 35 km east of the city of Embalse, and 386 m above sea level. With a population of 53,166 people is the seventh biggest city in the province of Cordoba.

The city was founded by Modesto Acuña on 9 September 1913.

Río Tercero entered into a sister-city relationship with Carmagnola, Italy in 2008.

== Notable residents ==
- Juan Fernandez, college basketball player with the Temple Owls
- Pablo Prigioni, basketball player
- Ivanna Madruga, tennis player that reached US Open semifinals (1980 and 1982) and Roland Garros semifinals (1980 and 1983)
- Oscar Galindez, world class triathlete
- Claudio Javier "Piojo" Lopez, soccer player
- Jose Maria "Pechito" Lopez, race car driver
- Marcelo Milanesio, basketball player

== See also ==
- Río Tercero explosion
