= 2010 Atlantic 10 men's basketball tournament =

- Tournament logo
- Classification: Division I
- Season: 2009–10
- Teams: 12
- Site: Boardwalk Hall; Atlantic City, New Jersey
- Champions: Temple Owls (9th title)
- Winning coach: Fran Dunphy (3rd title)
- MVP: Juan Fernandez (Temple)
- Top scorer: Kevin Anderson (Richmond) (54 points)

2009–10 Atlantic 10 men's basketball standings
	Conf.				Overall
Team	W		L	PCT	W		L	PCT
No. 12 Temple†	14	–	2	.875	29	–	6	.829
No. 25 Xavier	14	–	2	.875	26	–	9	.743
No. 24 Richmond	13	–	3	.813	26	–	9	.743
Saint Louis	11	–	5	.688	23	–	13	.639
Rhode Island	9	–	7	.563	26	–	10	.722
Charlotte	9	–	7	.563	19	–	12	.613
Dayton	8	–	8	.500	25	–	12	.676
St. Bonaventure	7	–	9	.438	15	–	16	.484
Duquesne	7	–	9	.438	16	–	16	.500
George Washington	6	–	10	.375	16	–	15	.516
UMass	5	–	11	.313	12	–	20	.375
Saint Joseph's	5	–	11	.313	11	–	20	.355
La Salle	4	–	12	.250	12	–	18	.400
Fordham	0	–	16	.000	2	–	26	.071
† 2010 Atlantic 10 Tournament winner Rankings from AP Poll

The 2010 Atlantic 10 men's basketball tournament was played initially at campus sites for the first round on March 9, 2010, and subsequently at Boardwalk Hall in Atlantic City, New Jersey, from March 12 through March 14, 2010. The Temple Owls won the tournament and thereby received an automatic bid to the 2010 NCAA Men's Division I Basketball Tournament.

Seeding for the tournament was determined by the conference standings at the end of the regular season. The last two teams in the standings did not qualify for the tournament.

Temple's victory was their third consecutive A-10 tournament championship. They became the first team to win three straight since UMass won five consecutive titles from 1992 through 1996.

The championship game was nationally televised on CBS, the first time the league's championship game was broadcast by the network. In years past, ESPN had televised the game.

== Bracket ==
First round Campus Sites; March 9
8	St. Bonaventure	83
9	Duquesne	71
5	Rhode Island	87
12	Saint Joseph's	76
6	Charlotte	56
11	UMass	59
7	Dayton	70
10	George Washington	60

Second round Boardwalk Hall; March 12
1	#17 Temple	69
8	St. Bonaventure	51
4	Saint Louis	47
5	Rhode Island	63
3	Richmond	77
11	UMass	72
2	#24 Xavier	78
7	Dayton	73

Semifinals; Boardwalk Hall; March 13
1	#17 Temple	57
5	Rhode Island	44
3	Richmond	89*
2	#24 Xavier	85

Championship Game; Boardwalk Hall; March 14
1	#17 Temple	56
3	Richmond	52

Asterisk denotes game ended in overtime.
