= List of Duquesne Dukes men's basketball seasons =

This is a list of seasons completed by the Duquesne Dukes men's college basketball team.

== Seasons ==
Statistics overview
Season	Coach	Overall	Conference	Standing	Postseason
Alexander Hogarty (Independent) (1913–1914)
1913–14	Alexander Hogarty	7–2			
Fr. Eugene McGuigan (Independent) (1914–1920)
1914–15	Fr. Eugene McGuigan	12–2			
1915–16	Fr. Eugene McGuigan	7–2			
1916–17	Fr. Eugene McGuigan	7–3			
1917–18	Fr. Eugene McGuigan	4–4			
1918–19	Fr. Eugene McGuigan	4–6			
1919–20	Fr. Eugene McGuigan	6–10			
Ben Lubic (Independent) (1920–1921)
1920–21	Ben Lubic	11–6			
Fr. Eugene McGuigan (Independent) (1921–1923)
1921–22	Fr. Eugene McGuigan	10–6			
1922–23	Fr. Eugene McGuigan	16–2			
Bill Campbell (Independent) (1923–1924)
1923–24	Bill Campbell	8–6			
Chick Davies (Independent) (1924–1948)
1924–25	Chick Davies	11–7			
1925–26	Chick Davies	15–3			
1926–27	Chick Davies	16–4			
1927–28	Chick Davies	15–7			
1928–29	Chick Davies	12–8			
1929–30	Chick Davies	18–10			
1930–31	Chick Davies	12–6			
1931–32	Chick Davies	14–6			
1932–33	Chick Davies	15–1			
1933–34	Chick Davies	19–2			
1934–35	Chick Davies	18–1			
1935–36	Chick Davies	14–3			
1936–37	Chick Davies	13–6			
1937–38	Chick Davies	6–11			
1938–39	Chick Davies	14–4			
1939–40	Chick Davies	20–3			NCAA Final Four; NIT Runner-up
1940–41	Chick Davies	17–3			Declined NCAA Invite; NIT Quarterfinal
1941–42	Chick Davies	15–6			
1942–43	Chick Davies	12–7			
1946–47	Chick Davies	21–2			Declined NCAA Invite; NIT Quarterfinal
1947–48	Chick Davies	17–6			
Dudey Moore (Independent) (1948–1958)
1948–49	Dudey Moore	17–5			
1949–50	Dudey Moore	23–6			NIT Fourth Place
1950–51	Dudey Moore	16–11			National Campus Tournament Quarterfinal
1951–52	Dudey Moore	23–4			NCAA Elite Eight; NIT Fourth Place
1952–53	Dudey Moore	21–8			NIT Third Place
1953–54	Dudey Moore	26–3			NIT Runner-up
1954–55	Dudey Moore	22–4			NIT Champion
1955–56	Dudey Moore	17–10			NIT Quarterfinal
1956–57	Dudey Moore	16–7			
1957–58	Dudey Moore	10–12			
Red Manning (Independent) (1958–1974)
1958–59	Red Manning	13–11			
1959–60	Red Manning	8–15			
1960–61	Red Manning	15–7			
1961–62	Red Manning	22–7			NIT Fourth Place
1962–63	Red Manning	13–9			
1963–64	Red Manning	16–7			NIT Quarterfinal
1964–65	Red Manning	14–10			
1965–66	Red Manning	14–9			
1966–67	Red Manning	7–15			
1967–68	Red Manning	18–7			NIT First Round
1968–69	Red Manning	21–5			NCAA University Division Sweet Sixteen
1969–70	Red Manning	17–7			NIT First Round
1970–71	Red Manning	21–4			NCAA Division I First Round
1971–72	Red Manning	20–5			
1972–73	Red Manning	16–8			
1973–74	Red Manning	12–12			
John Cinicola (Independent) (1974–1976)
1974–75	John Cinicola	14–11			
1975–76	John Cinicola	12–13			
John Cinicola (Atlantic 10 Conference) (1976–1978)
1976–77	John Cinicola	15–15	3–7	3rd (West)	NCAA Division I First Round
1977–78	John Cinicola	11–17	5–5	1st (West)	
Mike Rice (Atlantic 10 Conference) (1978–1982)
1978–79	Mike Rice	13–13	2–8	7th	
1979–80	Mike Rice	18–10	7–3	T–1st	NIT Second Round
1980–81	Mike Rice	20–10	10–3	T–1st	NIT First Round
1981–82	Mike Rice	11–16	5–9	6th	
Jim Satalin (Atlantic 10 Conference) (1982–1989)
1982–83	Jim Satalin	12–16	6–8	4th (West)	
1983–84	Jim Satalin	10–18	8–10	T–6th	
1984–85	Jim Satalin	12–18	6–12	8th	
1985–86	Jim Satalin	15–14	9–9	5th	
1986–87	Jim Satalin	12–17	7–11	T–6th	
1987–88	Jim Satalin	11–21	6–12	8th	
1988–89	Jim Satalin	13–16	7–11	T–6th	
John Carroll (Atlantic 10 Conference) (1989–1992)
1989–90	John Carroll	7–22	5–13	T–8th	
1990–91	John Carroll	13–15	10–8	T–3rd	
1991–92	John Carroll	13–15	6–10	T–6th	
John Carroll (Midwestern Collegiate Conference) (1992–1993)
1992–93	John Carroll	13–15	5–9	T–5th	
John Carroll (Atlantic 10 Conference) (1993–1995)
1993–94	John Carroll	17–13	8–8	T–3rd	NIT Second Round
1994–95	John Carroll	10–18	5–11	8th	
Scott Edgar (Atlantic 10 Conference) (1995–1998)
1995–96	Scott Edgar	9–18	3–13	T–5th (West)	
1996–97	Scott Edgar	9–18	5–11	T–5th (West)	
1997–98	Scott Edgar	11–19	5–11	T–4th (West)	
Darelle Porter (Atlantic 10 Conference) (1998–2001)
1998–99	Darelle Porter	5–23	1–15	6th (West)	
1999–00	Darelle Porter	9–20	4–12	6th (West)	
2000–01	Darelle Porter	9–21	3–13	10th	
Danny Nee (Atlantic 10 Conference) (2001–2006)
2001–02	Danny Nee	9–19	4–12	6th (West)	
2002–03	Danny Nee	10–20	4–12	6th (West)	
2003–04	Danny Nee	12–17	6–10	5th (West)	
2004–05	Danny Nee	8–22	5–11	5th (West)	
2005–06	Danny Nee	3–24	1–15	14th	
Ron Everhart (Atlantic 10 Conference) (2006–2012)
2006–07	Ron Everhart	10–19	6–10	T–10th	
2007–08	Ron Everhart	17–13	7–9	10th	
2008–09	Ron Everhart	21–14	9–7	T–5th	NIT First Round
2009–10	Ron Everhart	16–16	7–9	8th	CBI First Round
2010–11	Ron Everhart	19–13	10–6	4th	CBI Quarterfinal
2011–12	Ron Everhart	16–15	7–9	T–9th	
Jim Ferry (Atlantic 10 Conference) (2012–2017)
2012–13	Jim Ferry	8–22	1–15	16th	
2013–14	Jim Ferry	13–17	5–11	10th	
2014–15	Jim Ferry	12–19	6–12	11th	
2015–16	Jim Ferry	17–17	6–12	T–10th	CBI Quarterfinal
2016–17	Jim Ferry	10–22	3–15	14th	
Keith Dambrot (Atlantic 10 Conference) (2017–2024)
2017–18	Keith Dambrot	16–16	7–11	T–10th	
2018–19	Keith Dambrot	19–13	10–8	T–6th	
2019–20	Keith Dambrot	21–9	11–7	T–5th	No postseason held
2020–21	Keith Dambrot	9–9	7–7	9th	
2021–22	Keith Dambrot	6–24	1–16	14th	
2022–23	Keith Dambrot	20–13	10–8	T–6th	CBI First Round
2023–24	Keith Dambrot	25–12	10–8	6th	NCAA Division I Second Round
Dru Joyce III (Atlantic 10 Conference) (2024–present)
2024–25	Dru Joyce III	13–19	8–10	9th	
2025–26	Dru Joyce III	18–15	9–9	7th	
Total:		1,504–1,206 (.555)			
National champion Postseason invitational champion Conference regular season champion Conference regular season and conference tournament champion Division regular season champion Division regular season and conference tournament champion Conference tournament champion
