= List of Duquesne Dukes men's basketball head coaches =

The following is a list of Duquesne Dukes men's basketball head coaches. There have been 18 head coaches of the Dukes in their 107-season history.

== Coaches ==
Duquesne's current head coach is Keith Dambrot. He was hired as the Dukes' head coach in March 2017, replacing Jim Ferry, who was fired after the 2016–17 season.

No.	Tenure	Coach	Years	Record	Pct.
1	1913–1914	Alexander Hogarty	1	7–3	.700
2	1914–1920; 1921–1923	Eugene McGuigan	8	67–35	.657
3	1920–1921	Ben Lubic	1	11–6	.647
4	1923–1924	Bill Campbell	1	8–6	.571
5	1924–1948 (Note: Duquesne did not field a team for the 1943–44, 1944–45, and 1945–46 seasons.)	Chick Davies	21	314–106	.748
6	1948–1958	Dudey Moore	10	191–70	.732
7	1958–1974	Red Manning	16	247–138	.642
8	1974–1978	John Cinicola	4	52–56	.481
9	1978–1982	Mike Rice	4	62–49	.559
10	1982–1989	Jim Satalin	7	85–120	.415
11	1989–1995	John Carroll	6	73–98	.427
12	1995–1998	Scott Edgar	3	29–55	.345
13	1998–2001	Darelle Porter	3	23–64	.264
14	2001–2006	Danny Nee	5	42–102	.292
15	2006–2012	Ron Everhart	6	99–89	.527
16	2012–2017	Jim Ferry	5	60–97	.382
17	2017–2024	Keith Dambrot	6	91–84	.520
18	2024–present	Dru Joyce III	1	–	–
Totals		18 coaches	107 seasons	1,461–1,178	.554
Records updated through end of 2022–23 season Source
