= Duquesne Dukes men's basketball statistical leaders =

The Duquesne Dukes men's basketball statistical leaders are individual statistical leaders of the Duquesne Dukes men's basketball program in various categories, including points, rebounds, assists, steals, and blocks. Within those areas, the lists identify single-game, single-season, and career leaders. The Dukes represent Duquesne University in the NCAA's Atlantic 10 Conference.

Duquesne began competing in intercollegiate basketball in 1913. However, the school's record book does not generally list records from before the 1950s, as records from before this period are often incomplete and inconsistent. Since scoring was much lower in this era, and teams played much fewer games during a typical season, it is likely that few or no players from this era would appear on these lists anyway.

The NCAA did not officially record assists as a stat until the 1983–84 season, and blocks and steals until the 1985–86 season, but Duquesne's record books includes players in these stats before these seasons. These lists are updated through the end of the 2020–21 season.

== Scoring ==
Career
Rk	Player	Points	Seasons
1	Dick Ricketts	1,963	1951–52 1952–53 1953–54 1954–55
2	Derrick Alston	1,903	1990–91 1991–92 1992–93 1993–94
3	Tom Pipkins	1,828	1993–94 1994–95 1995–96 1996–97
4	Wayne Smith	1,820	1998–99 1999–00 2000–01 2001–02
5	Norm Nixon	1,805	1973–74 1974–75 1975–76 1976–77
6	Willie Somerset	1,725	1961–62 1963–64 1964–65
7	Derrick Colter	1,695	2012–13 2013–14 2014–15 2015–16
8	Bill Clark	1,628	2007–08 2008–09 2009–10 2010–11
9	Sihugo Green	1,605	1953–54 1954–55 1955–56
10	Bryant McAllister	1,546	2002–03 2003–04 2004–05 2005–06

Season
Rk	Player	Points	Season
1	Mark Stevenson	788	1989–90
2	Sihugo Green	662	1955–56
3	Norm Nixon	661	1976–77
4	Aaron Jackson	657	2008–09
5	Derrick Alston	639	1993–94
6	Derrick Colter	609	2015–16
7	Micah Mason	608	2015–16
8	Dick Ricketts	606	1952–53
9	Rick Suder	593	1985–86
	Willie Somerset	593	1964–65

Single game
Rk	Player	Points	Season	Opponent
1	Ron Guziak	50	1967–68	St. Francis
2	B.B. Flenory	48	1978–79	Ohio U.
3	Willie Somerset	47	1963–64	Xavier
4	Aaron Jackson	46	2008–09	Virginia Tech
	Willie Somerset	46	1963–64	St. Bonaventure
6	Mark Stevenson	44	1989–90	St. Joseph’s
	Sihugo Green	44	1955–56	Bowling Green
8	Mark Stevenson	43	1989–90	West Virginia
9	Willie Somerset	42	1964–65	DePaul
	Jim Tucker	42	1951–52	So. Baldwin-Wallace

== Rebounds ==
Career
Rk	Player	Rebounds	Seasons
1	Dick Ricketts	1,359	1951–52 1952–53 1953–54 1954–55
2	Bruce Atkins	1,147	1978–79 1979–80 1980–81 1981–82
3	Damian Saunders	1,019	2007–08 2008–09 2009–10 2010–11
4	Sihugo Green	936	1953–54 1954–55 1955–56
5	Lionel Billingy	893	1971–72 1972–73 1973–74
6	Derrick Alston	879	1990–91 1991–92 1992–93 1993–94
7	Bob Slobodnik	815	1958–59 1959–60 1960–61
8	Garry Nelson	722	1968–69 1969–70 1970–71
9	Wayne Smith	690	1998–99 1999–00 2000–01 2001–02
10	Bill Clark	680	2007–08 2008–09 2009–10 2010–11

Season
Rk	Player	Rebounds	Season
1	Dick Ricketts	450	1954–55
2	Damian Saunders	360	2009–10
3	Lionel Billingy	357	1971–72
4	Sihugo Green	356	1955–56
5	Bruce Atkins	352	1980–81
6	Sihugo Green	341	1954–55
7	Phil Washington	334	1967–68
8	Dick Ricketts	318	1952–53
9	Lionel Billingy	313	1972–73
10	Bob Slobodnik	308	1959–60
	Bob Slobodnik	308	1958–59

Single game
Rk	Player	Rebounds	Season	Opponent
1	Lionel Billingy	29	1972–73	Wheeling
2	Dick Ricketts	28	1954–55	Villanova
3	Willie Ross	27	1964–65	Kent State
	Bob DePalma	27	1956–57	Geneva
	Dick Ricketts	27	1954–55	Westminster

== Assists ==
Career
Rk	Player	Assists	Seasons
1	Norm Nixon	577	1973–74 1974–75 1975–76 1976–77
2	Clayton Adams	573	1987–88 1988–89 1989–90 1990–91
3	Derrick Colter	526	2012–13 2013–14 2014–15 2015–16
4	Aaron Jackson	505	2005–06 2006–07 2007–08 2008–09
5	Kenya Hunter	439	1992–93 1993–94 1994–95 1995–96
6	Tony Petrarca	418	1986–87 1987–88 1988–89 1989–90 1990–91
7	Brian Shanahan	373	1985–86 1986–87 1987–88 1988–89
8	Andy Sisinni	366	1980–81 1981–82 1982–83 1983–84
9	Courtney Wallace	364	1997–98 1998–99 1999–00 2000–01
10	Mike James	348	1994–95 1995–96 1996–97 1997–98

Season
Rk	Player	Assists	Season
1	Aaron Jackson	194	2008–09
2	Norm Nixon	178	1976–77
3	Martin Osimani	172	2003–04
4	T. J. McConnell	171	2011–12
5	Clayton Adams	163	1987–88
6	Sincere Carry	161	2018–19
7	Clayton Adams	159	1988–89
8	Sincere Carry	158	2019–20
9	Derrick Colter	156	2015–16
	Derrick Colter	156	2012–13

Single game
Rk	Player	Assists	Season	Opponent
1	Tarence Guinyard	12	2025–26	St. Bonaventure
	Bryant McAllister	12	2005–06	Fordham
	Martin Osimani	12	2003–04	Ohio
	Clayton Adams	12	1987–88	Indiana, Pa.
	Brian Shanahan	12	1986–87	Iona
6	Sincere Carry	11	2019–20	St. Bonaventure
	Derrick Colter	11	2015–16	Saint Joseph’s
	Derrick Colter	11	2012–13	Charlotte
	T. J. McConnell	11	2011–12	UDC
	Martin Osimani	11	2004–05	N.C. A&T
	Tony Petrarca	11	1989–90	Geo. Wash.
	Clayton Adams	11	1989–90	Pitt
	Clayton Adams	11	1988–89	UMass
	Rick Suder	11	1983–84	Saint Joseph’s
	Andy Sisinni	11	1983–84	Maryland

== Steals ==
Career
Rk	Player	Steals	Seasons
1	Damian Saunders	277	2007–08 2008–09 2009–10 2010–11
2	Kenya Hunter	218	1992–93 1993–94 1994–95 1995–96
3	Clayton Adams	215	1987–88 1988–89 1989–90 1990–91
4	Mike James	201	1994–95 1995–96 1996–97 1997–98
5	T. J. McConnell	177	2010–11 2011–12
	Tom Pipkins	177	1993–94 1994–95 1995–96 1996–97
7	Wayne Smith	173	1998–99 1999–00 2000–01 2001–02
8	Aaron Jackson	169	2005–06 2006–07 2007–08 2008–09
9	Jimmy Clark III	163	2022–23 2023–24
10	Bryant McAllister	159	2002–03 2003–04 2004–05 2005–06

Season
Rk	Player	Steals	Season
1	T. J. McConnell	91	2010–11
2	Damian Saunders	89	2009–10
3	Jimmy Clark III	87	2023–24
4	T. J. McConnell	86	2011–12
5	Jimmy Clark III	76	2022–23
6	Damian Saunders	72	2010–11
7	Damian Saunders	71	2008–09
8	Clayton Adams	70	1987–88
9	Sincere Carry	68	2018–19
10	Kenya Hunter	65	1992–93
	Mike James	65	1997–98

Single game
Rk	Player	Steals	Season	Opponent
1	Bill Clark	7	2010–11	Houston Baptist
	Aaron Jackson	7	2008–09	St. Francis, Pa.
	Reggie Jackson	7	2006–07	Saint Louis
	Mike James	7	1997–98	La Salle
	Kenya Hunter	7	1992–93	Evansville
	Clayton Adams	7	1987–88	Rutgers

== Blocks ==
Career
Rk	Player	Blocks	Seasons
1	Damian Saunders	300	2007–08 2008–09 2009–10 2010–11
2	Derrick Alston	229	1990–91 1991–92 1992–93 1993–94
3	Kieron Achara	185	2003–04 2004–05 2005–06 2006–07 2007–08
4	David Dixon	184	2022–23 2023–24 2024–25 2025–26
5	Michael Hughes	177	2018–19 2019–20 2020–21
6	Shawn James	111	2007–08
7	Andre Marhold	107	2009–10 2010–11 2011–12 2012–13
8	Darius Lewis	105	2013–14 2014–15 2015–16 2016–17
9	Tre Williams	98	2021–22 2022–23 2023–24
10	B.J. Monteiro	80	2008–09 2009–10 2010–11 2011–12

Season
Rk	Player	Blocks	Season
1	Shawn James	111	2007–08
2	Damian Saunders	94	2009–10
3	Damian Saunders	84	2010–11
4	Damian Saunders	83	2008–09
5	Michael Hughes	82	2019–20
6	Tydus Verhoeven	71	2017–18
7	Michael Hughes	66	2018–19
8	Derrick Alston	60	1992–93
	Derrick Alston	60	1991–92
	David Dixon	60	2023–24

Single game
Rk	Player	Blocks	Season	Opponent
1	Shawn James	12	2007–08	Oakland
2	Shawn James	10	2007–08	Saint Joe’s
3	Tydus Verhoeven	9	2017–18	G. Mason
	Damian Saunders	9	2009–10	ODU
5	Michael Hughes	7	2019–20	Saint Louis
	Michael Hughes	7	2018–19	GW
	Tydus Verhoeven	7	2017–18	Robt Morris
	Darius Lewis	7	2015–16	Saint Louis
	Darius Lewis	7	2014–15	Saint Louis
	Damian Saunders	7	2009–10	Saint Joe’s
	Damian Saunders	7	2009–10	Canisius
	Shawn James	7	2007–08	La Salle
	Shawn James	7	2007–08	Xavier
	Shawn James	7	2007–08	St. Francis, Pa.
	Shawn James	7	2007–08	Niagara
	Derrick Alston	7	1990–91	Saint Joe’s
