= Suder =

Suder is a surname. Notable people with the name include:

- Joseph Suder, German composer
- Scott Suder (born 1968), American politician from Wisconsin
- A family of American sportspeople:
  - Pete Suder (1916–2006), baseball player
  - Rick Suder (born c. 1964), Pete's grandson; basketball player and businessman
  - Peter Suder (born 2003), Rick's son; basketball player

Fictional

- Lon Suder, fictional character in Star Trek: Voyager

== See also ==
- Suter, surname
