= 1939–40 Duquesne Dukes men's basketball team =

American college basketball season

1939–40 Duquesne Dukes men's basketball

NIT championship game, NCAA tournament Final Four
- Conference: Independent
- Record: 20–3
- Head coach: Chick Davies (16th season)
- Home arena: Duquesne Gardens

The 1939–40 Duquesne Dukes men's basketball team represented Duquesne University during the 1939–40 NCAA men's basketball season. The Dukes were led by head coach Chick Davies and played their home games at Duquesne Gardens in Pittsburgh, Pennsylvania. Playing as an NCAA independent, Duquesne finished the regular season with a 17–1 record. The team advanced to the championship game of the National Invitation Tournament before losing to Colorado, then played in the NCAA tournament where they reached the only Final Four in program history. The Dukes finished with a 20–3 record overall with two of the losses coming to National champion Indiana.

== Roster ==
1939–40 Duquesne Dukes men's basketball team
Players
Coaches

Pos.	#	Name	Height	Weight	Year	Hometown
G/F		Moe Becker	6 ft 1 in (1.85 m)	185 lb (84 kg)	Jr	Pittsburgh
G		Rudy Debnar	5 ft 11 in (1.8 m)	160 lb (73 kg)	Jr	Charleroi, Pennsylvania
		Lou Kasperik	—	—	Jr	Smithton, Pennsylvania
G		Ed Milkovich	5 ft 9 in (1.75 m)	170 lb (77 kg)	Jr	Pittsburgh
F		Paul Widowitz	6 ft 1 in (1.85 m)	170 lb (77 kg)	Jr	Pittsburgh

Head coach

- Chick Davies

Assistant coach(es)

Legend

- (C) Team captain
- (S) Suspended
- (I) Ineligible
- (W) Walk-on
- Injured
- Current redshirt

== Schedule and results ==
Date time, TV	Rank^{#}	Opponent^{#}	Result	Record	Site city, state
Regular season
Dec 27, 1939*		Indiana	L 49–51	3–1	Duquesne Gardens; Pittsburgh, Pennsylvania
Jan 2, 1940*		Colorado	W 47–45 ^{OT}	4–1	Duquesne Gardens; Pittsburgh, Pennsylvania
NIT
Mar 11, 1940*		vs. St. John's; Quarterfinals	W 38–31	18–1	Madison Square Garden; New York, New York
Mar 13, 1940*		vs. Oklahoma A&M; Semifinals	W 34–30	19–1	Madison Square Garden; New York, New York
Mar 15, 1940*		vs. Colorado; Championship game	L 40–51	19–2	Madison Square Garden; New York, New York
NCAA tournament
Mar 22, 1940*		vs. Western Kentucky; East Regional Final – Elite Eight	W 30–29	20–2	Butler Fieldhouse; Indianapolis, Indiana
Mar 23, 1940*		vs. Indiana; National Semifinal – Final Four	L 30–39	20–3	Butler Fieldhouse; Indianapolis, Indiana
*Non-conference game. ^{#}Rankings from AP Poll. (#) Tournament seedings in parentheses. E=East.
