= 1976–77 Duquesne Dukes men's basketball team =

American college basketball season

1976–77 Duquesne Dukes men's basketball

NCAA tournament, First round
- Conference: Atlantic 10
- Record: 15–15 (3–7 Atlantic 10)
- Head coach: John Cinicola (3rd season)
- Home arena: Civic Arena

1976–77 Eastern 8 men's basketball standings
	Conf.				Overall
Team	W		L	PCT	W		L	PCT
East
Rutgers	7	–	1	.875	18	–	10	.643
Villanova	6	–	1	.857	23	–	10	.697
George Washington	5	–	3	.625	14	–	12	.538
UMass	3	–	4	.429	20	–	11	.645
West
West Virginia	5	–	5	.500	18	–	11	.621
Penn State	5	–	5	.500	11	–	15	.423
Duquesne †	3	–	7	.300	15	–	15	.500
Pittsburgh	1	–	9	.100	6	–	21	.222
† 1977 Eastern 8 Tournament winner Rankings from AP Poll

The 1976–77 Duquesne Dukes men's basketball team represented Duquesne University in the 1976–77 NCAA Division I men's basketball season. The Dukes qualified for the NCAA tournament by winning the Eastern 8 tournament (a few years later, the conference became known as the Atlantic 10). The Dukes did not reach another NCAA Tournament for over four decades despite winning the regular season title twice in the 1980s. In 2024, Duquesne finally won a conference tournament again.
