= 2009–10 Duquesne Dukes men's basketball team =

American college basketball season

2009–10 Duquesne Dukes men's basketball

CBI, First Round, L 51–65 vs. Princeton
- Conference: Atlantic 10
- Record: 16–16 (7–9 A-10)
- Head coach: Ron Everhart (4th season)
- Assistant coaches: Bill Barton; Steve Hall; Scott Rigot
- Home arena: A.J. Palumbo Center (Capacity: 4,406)

2009–10 Atlantic 10 men's basketball standings
	Conf.				Overall
Team	W		L	PCT	W		L	PCT
No. 12 Temple†	14	–	2	.875	29	–	6	.829
No. 25 Xavier	14	–	2	.875	26	–	9	.743
No. 24 Richmond	13	–	3	.813	26	–	9	.743
Saint Louis	11	–	5	.688	23	–	13	.639
Rhode Island	9	–	7	.563	26	–	10	.722
Charlotte	9	–	7	.563	19	–	12	.613
Dayton	8	–	8	.500	25	–	12	.676
St. Bonaventure	7	–	9	.438	15	–	16	.484
Duquesne	7	–	9	.438	16	–	16	.500
George Washington	6	–	10	.375	16	–	15	.516
UMass	5	–	11	.313	12	–	20	.375
Saint Joseph's	5	–	11	.313	11	–	20	.355
La Salle	4	–	12	.250	12	–	18	.400
Fordham	0	–	16	.000	2	–	26	.071
† 2010 Atlantic 10 Tournament winner Rankings from AP Poll

The 2009–10 Duquesne Dukes men's basketball team represented Duquesne University in 2009–10 NCAA Division I men's basketball season.

Duquesne hoped to build on the success of the 2008–09 season and began the new year with five straight victories. Soon, however, a string of setbacks hit the team, including the loss of two players, one due to injury and the other to suspension. Duquesne lost its final non-conference game and slipped into a five-game losing streak. The team did manage to break the streak, but had trouble gaining any momentum. In mid-February the Dukes finally seemed to break free with a solid 21 point victory over La Salle, followed by a crucial road upset of the University of Charlotte, which was ranked first in the Atlantic 10 Conference at the time, and finally another upset of the University of Dayton Flyers in front of a sellout Pittsburgh crowd. However, Duquesne then lost its final two road games of the season.

Despite its lackluster season's end, Duquesne won an invitation to the College Basketball Invitational postseason tournament. The team lost to the Princeton Tigers, and the Dukes were eliminated in the first round, ending the 2009 season.

== Duquesne University ==
Duquesne University, also called Duquesne University of the Holy Spirit, is a private Catholic university in Pittsburgh, Pennsylvania, United States. The university's Duquesne Dukes compete in NCAA Division I (D-I). D-I schools are generally the major collegiate athletic powers, with larger budgets, more elaborate facilities, and higher numbers of athletic scholarships in comparison to Division II and III. This level was once called the University Division of the NCAA, and the Division II and III levels, the College Division; this terminology was replaced with the current numeric (I, II, III) divisions in 1973.

The Dukes have played twice in national championship games in the 1950s and won the National Invitation Tournament championship in 1955, when the NIT was the premier collegiate basketball tournament in the country. The men's basketball Dukes annually play its cross-town rival, the University of Pittsburgh Panthers, in Pittsburgh's highly anticipated and well-attended City Game. The current head coach is Ron Everhart, who has a two-year record of 27–32 (13–19 in the Atlantic 10 Conference). Well-known Duquesne players of the past include All-Americans Chuck Cooper, Sihugo Green, Dick Ricketts and Willie Somerset, and Norm Nixon, who won the Most Outstanding Player in Duquesne's 57–54 victory over the Villanova Wildcats in the 1977 Atlantic 10 men's basketball tournament.

== Preseason ==
Duquesne lost only one starter, Aaron Jackson, from the 2008–09 team which ended with a record of 21–13, the first time since 1981 that the school had 20 or more wins in a season. Picked to finish 12th in the Atlantic 10, Duquesne went on to finish second, losing to Temple by only five points in the conference championship game. This earned Duquesne a bid into the National Invitation Tournament, its first postseason appearance since 1994. The team was eliminated in a double-overtime first round loss to Virginia Tech, but the Dukes' unlikely success inspired the hope of a return to the NIT, or perhaps even the NCAA tournament.

On May 12, 2009, the school announced that two freshman forwards, Shawntez Patterson and Aleksandar Milovic, had been released from their scholarships and cleared to transfer to other schools. Both saw limited action in the 2008 season. Shawntez Patterson transferred to Pensacola Junior College, and Aleksandar Milovic transferred to the University of Hawaii.

Andre Marhold, a small forward and the first of two incoming freshmen, signed with Duquesne on April 16. Marhold, a native of Pittsburgh who moved to North Carolina for High School, averaged 17.0 points and 10.0 rebounds per game his senior year, in which his team was the regular season champion. He was ranked 188 in the top 1000 high school seniors by Hoop Scoop. Marhold turned down scholarship offers from Clemson, Charlotte, and Purdue.

Several weeks later on May 13, guard Sean Johnson of Queens, New York also signed with the team. He attended Christ the King high school, whose basketball team finished his senior year ranked fourth in the state and eleventh in the nation by ESPN. He averaged 22.4 points per game and was named New York City Catholic High School Athletic Association Most Valuable Player. Johnson also received scholarship offers from Nebraska, Manhattan, and Quinnipiac.

Prior to the start of the season, ESPN picked Duquesne to finish fifth in the Atlantic 10 conference, noting the loss of star Aaron Jackson but looking with optimism at the addition of 7 ft (2.1 m) center Morakinyo Williams and the continued development of other stars. Sophomore Melquan Bolding was also highlighted by ESPN as a key player in the Atlantic 10.

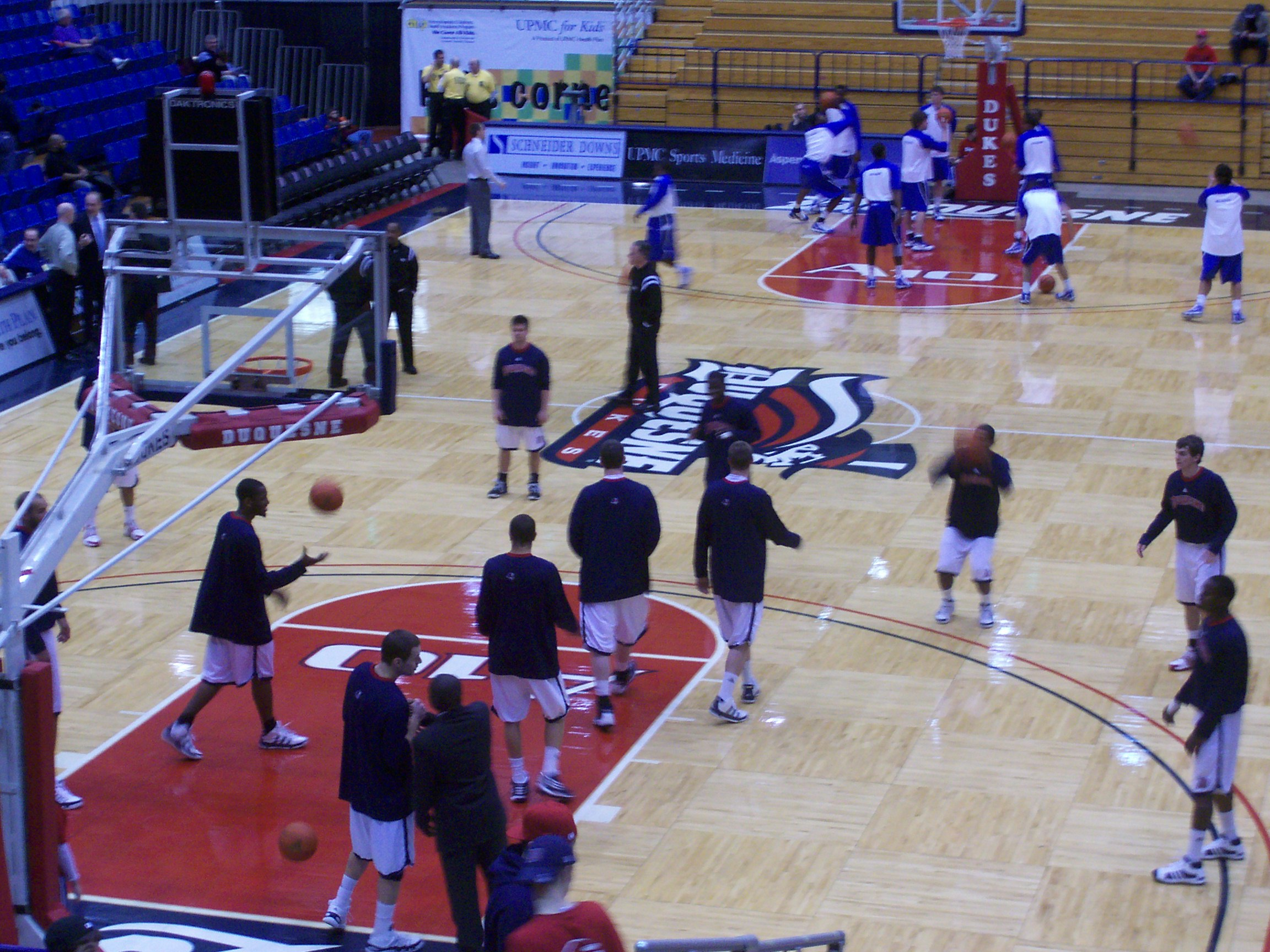
The 2009–10 Dukes warming up prior to a game

=== Incoming recruits ===
College recruiting information
Name	Hometown	School	Height	Weight	Commit date
Andre Marhold; SF	Charlotte, North Carolina	North Mecklenburg High	6 ft 6 in (1.98 m)	205 lb (93 kg)	Feb 16, 2009
Andre Marhold; SF	Recruit ratings: Scout: Rivals: (85)				
Sean Johnson; SG	Queens, New York	Christ the King	6 ft 2 in (1.88 m)	175 lb (79 kg)	May 4, 2009
Sean Johnson; SG	Recruit ratings: Scout: Rivals: (83)				
Overall recruit ranking: Scout: Unranked Rivals: Unranked
Note: In many cases, Scout, Rivals, 247Sports, On3, and ESPN may conflict in their listings of height and weight.; In these cases, the average was taken. ESPN grades are on a 100-point scale.; Sources: "Duquesne 2009 Basketball Commitments". Rivals.; "2009 Duquesne Basketball Commits". Scout.; "ESPN". ESPN.; "Scout.com Team Recruiting Rankings". Scout.; "2009 Team Ranking". Rivals.

=== Roster ===
#	Name	Height	Weight	Position	Class	Hometown		High School
0	Andre Marhold	6 ft 6 in (1.98 m)	205 lb (93 kg)	F	Fr.	Charlotte, North Carolina	United States	North Mecklenburg HS
2	Chase Robinson	6 ft 2 in (1.88 m)	190 lb (86 kg)	G	So.	Huntsville, Alabama	United States	Lee HS
3	Eric Evans	5 ft 11 in (1.80 m)	200 lb (91 kg)	G	So.	Detroit, Michigan	United States	Northwestern HS
4	Salim Fauras	5 ft 10 in (1.78 m)	160 lb (73 kg)	G	Fr.	Geneva	Switzerland	Bishop Ireton HS
5	Morakinyo Williams	7 ft 0 in (2.13 m)	270 lb (120 kg)	C	So.	Solihull	England	Bishop Ireton HS
13	Jason Duty	6 ft 1 in (1.85 m)	180 lb (82 kg)	G	Sr.	Cranberry Township, Pennsylvania	United States	Chartiers Valley HS
20	Sean Johnson	6 ft 2 in (1.88 m)	175 lb (79 kg)	G	Fr.	Queens, New York	United States	Christ the King HS
22	David Theis	6 ft 7 in (2.01 m)	230 lb (100 kg)	F	Jr.	Pittsburgh, Pennsylvania	United States	Vincentian Academy
23	Melquan Bolding	6 ft 3 in (1.91 m)	195 lb (88 kg)	G/F	So.	Mount Vernon, New York	United States	Notre Dame Prep
25	Damian Saunders	6 ft 7 in (2.01 m)	210 lb (95 kg)	F	Jr.	Waterbury, Connecticut	United States	Notre Dame Prep
30	Bill Clark	6 ft 5 in (1.96 m)	205 lb (93 kg)	G/F	Jr.	Redondo Beach, California	United States	Worcester Academy
32	B. J. Monteiro	6 ft 5 in (1.96 m)	195 lb (88 kg)	G/F	So.	Waterbury, Connecticut	United States	Crosby HS
33	Rodrigo Peggau	6 ft 8 in (2.03 m)	235 lb (107 kg)	F	Fr.	São Paulo	Brazil	The Patterson School
54	Oliver Lewinson	6 ft 9 in (2.06 m)	255 lb (116 kg)	C	So.	Payson, Arizona	United States	Payson HS
55	Lucas Newton	5 ft 10 in (1.78 m)	165 lb (75 kg)	G	Jr.	Ft. Lauderdale, Florida	United States	Westminster Academy

=== Coaching staff ===
Ron Everhart returned for his fourth season as head coach. After the departure of previous coach Danny Nee, Everhart steadily improved the team's record year after year, taking the team from 3–24 the year before he arrived to the 21–13 record of 2008–09. Everhart attended Virginia Tech, from which he graduated in 1985. He served as an assistant coach at Georgia Tech, Virginia Military Institute, and Tulane University. In 1995, he took his first head coaching job at McNeese State University, and also coached at Northeastern University before moving to Duquesne in 2006.

Bill Barton returned for his third season as Associate Head Coach. Steve Hall and Scott Rigot both served as assistant coaches for their second year. Jason Byrd was the Director of Basketball Operations.

== Regular season ==
=== Exhibition, Nicholls State, and Iowa ===
The Dukes played their first game of the season on November 7 in an exhibition match against Division III La Roche. Duquesne scored a 47-point victory in which Damian Saunders led in scoring with 17 points. Despite the solid win, Duquesne made only 47.6% from the free throw line, a trend which haunted the team the rest of the season.

The regular season home-opener was another victory for the team, as they defeated Nicholls State 85–62 on November 13. Early in the game, Melquan Bolding hit the floor on a hard foul during a breakaway. After a few minutes, he recovered and went on to lead the team with 25 points. Saunders scored 17 points with 19 rebounds, his first of a long streak of double-doubles. This game was also the second and final game of B.J. Monteiro's 2-game suspension following allegations of participating in a robbery. Three days later, it was announced that Bolding had fractured his wrist when he was fouled, and would be unable to play for 4–6 weeks.

Despite the loss of Bolding, the team went on the road to face Iowa on November 17, with newly returned B.J. Monteiro starting in place of Melquan Bolding. When down 49–50 with 11.7 seconds left, Bill Clark took an off-balance 3-point shot which spun in, putting the team up 52–50 and sealing their second victory of the regular season. This was Duquesne's first ever victory at a Big Ten arena, and its first victory against a Big Ten school since a win over Illinois in 1973.

=== The CBE Classic ===
The team then traveled to Cullowhee, North Carolina for three games as part of the O'Reilly Auto Parts CBE Classic. Duquesne defeated Binghamton 70–52 to extend its record to 3–0, with Saunders leading the way with 24 points. The next day the team improved to 4–0 with an overtime 75–72 victory against Division II Arkansas-Monticello. On the third day of play, Duquesne finally lost to Western Carolina, 77–83.

=== The City Game and Chuck Cooper Classic ===
The Dukes then returned home, where they faced Radford on November 29. B.J. Monteiro continued to perform well as a starter in replacing Melquan Bolding, leading the team with 21 points. Next up for the team was the annual City Game match-up between Duquesne and its crosstown rival Pitt. In front of 12,336 fans at the Mellon Arena, Duquesne sprang out to a 16-point lead before slipping and losing 58–67 in double overtime. Bill Clark led all players with 23 points but the team hit foul trouble, with Saunders, Monteiro, and Peggau all fouling out in the final minutes.

On December 5, Duquesne hosted the Chuck Cooper Classic, in which it defeated the Savannah State Tigers by a score of 58–44. Eric Evans led with 17 points and Damian Saunders contributed 15.

=== West Virginia, Robert Morris, and Canisius ===
Four days later, the Dukes were blown out 39–68 by #7 West Virginia. Saunders led the team with only 12 points. One analyst attributed this loss to the skill of the Mountaineers, an abysmal night by star Bill Clark, as well as the continued absence of Melquan Bolding and now senior captain Jason Duty, who missed the game with a sprained ankle.

On December 12 the Dukes faced off against another local rival, Robert Morris. In a 59–54 win, B.J. Monteiro again led the team with 17 points. Monteiro's continued high level of play prompted some analysts, as well as fans, to wonder whether the approaching return of Melquan Bolding would send Monteiro back to the bench, or if someone else would lose their starting position. Four days later the Dukes held off the Canisius Golden Griffins in a double overtime 86–77 victory at home. Bill Clark and Damian Saunders both contributed double doubles while B.J. Monteiro scored a career high 27 points.

=== The end of non-conference play ===
The team then traveled to Indianapolis, where they lost to IUPUI 64–73, despite a career high 20 points from Eric Evans. In their final game before a short Christmas break, Duquesne defeated the Saint Francis Red Flash 86–56. Damian Saunders scored his tenth double-double, making him the national leader in that statistic, as well as second in rebounds. Following the break, Duquesne lost its final non-conference game to the Old Dominion Monarchs by a score of 54–63, the first of a five-game losing streak. Saunders still managed to post his eleventh double-double, coming just one block short of what would have been only the second triple-double in school history.

=== Early conference play ===
Duquesne opened conference play on January 6 in a match against the Richmond Spiders, a team which the Dukes had not defeated since the Spiders joined the Atlantic 10 in 2001. This game marked the return of Melquan Bolding, though he did not start and scored only three points in fourteen minutes of playing time. Richmond managed to extend their streak, defeating the Dukes 86–80, while Saunders maintained his nation-leading position and now placed eighth in both blocks and steals. Duquesne then traveled to Dayton, Ohio where they lost to the Dayton Flyers 72–78 in overtime in front of a crowd of 13,435, the largest crowd the team would see all season. Senior Jason Duty was fouled on a 3-point attempt at the end of the game when his team was down by one, but made only one of three foul shots, sending the game into overtime. Melquan Bolding scored 13 points in 36 minutes, though he did not start, and Saunders came into the game now leading the nation in rebounds.

Duquesne found itself in overtime once again as they dropped another game against the St. Louis Billikens in double overtime, 75–79. Melquan Bolding suffered another setback as he sat out most of the game, playing only five minutes due to strep throat. The team then went back out on the road to face the Rhode Island Rams, where they again lost with a final score of 67–75, dropping their conference record to 0–4. Bill Clark missed a game for the first time in his college career due to a suspension on suspicion of a "secondary NCAA rules violation." Melquan Bolding started the game for the first time since his injury, but only scored 6 points.

=== First conference win, Xavier, and Saint Joseph's ===
Two days later, Clark was reinstated. With Clark back in the lineup for a home game against St. Bonaventure Bonnies, Ron Everhart tried a new starting lineup: one that included Bolding and Monteiro, but left Senior Jason Duty on the bench. The Dukes took a 15-point lead at half time, but the Bonnies came back. With less than thirty seconds left, Bill Clark drew a charging penalty which gave his team the ball, down by two. One quick possession by each team left it 67–69 in favor of the Bonnies. On the final play, Damian Saunders drove towards the basket before passing it out to Melquan Bolding, who hit a 3-point shot to put the Dukes up by one with 3.5 seconds remaining. Duquesne won 70–69, giving them their first win since December 22.

The winning feeling was short-lived, however, as the Dukes were shut down by the Xavier Musketeers on January 28, losing 86–50. Melquan Bolding led the team with 14 points, Damian Saunders scored only 6, and Bill Clark only 4. On January 31 the team pulled out a 74–71 win against the Saint Joseph's Hawks at home, with Melquan Bolding leading the team with 24 points.

=== Temple, George Washington, and Massachusetts ===
Once again, though, the Dukes were unable to build momentum as they lost 60–76 to #19 ranked Temple. Bill Clark and Eric Evans led the team with just 12 points each. On February 6, the Dukes braved a blizzard for a game against the George Washington Colonials in Washington, D.C.. Saunders led the way to a 70–63 win with a career-high 27 points. Returning home on February 11 to face the Massachusetts Minutemen, the Dukes were unable to win two consecutive games for the third straight time, losing 80–84. Damian Saunders scored 15 points, but was injured and left the game for a while; when he returned, he did not score in the remainder of his playing time. He did, however, become Duquesne's 33rd player to pass the 1,000 career points mark.

=== Introducing the 10–40, Charlotte, and a rematch with Dayton ===
Duquesne enjoyed another game at home on February 14 against the La Salle Explorers. Ron Everhart sought a new strategy for his team, which was struggling in conference play. In this game, La Salle was missing three players, leaving them with an active roster of only eight players. Duquesne ran a 10–40 pattern, in which two squads of five players execute short, intense bursts before being switched out for the other squad. At first, Duquesne fell behind by 14 points, but the strategy paid off as La Salle's players tired. With La Salle fatigued, Duquesne switched back to a normal rotation and went on to win 103–82. Bill Clark scored a career high 34 points, and also surpassed the 1,000 point mark.

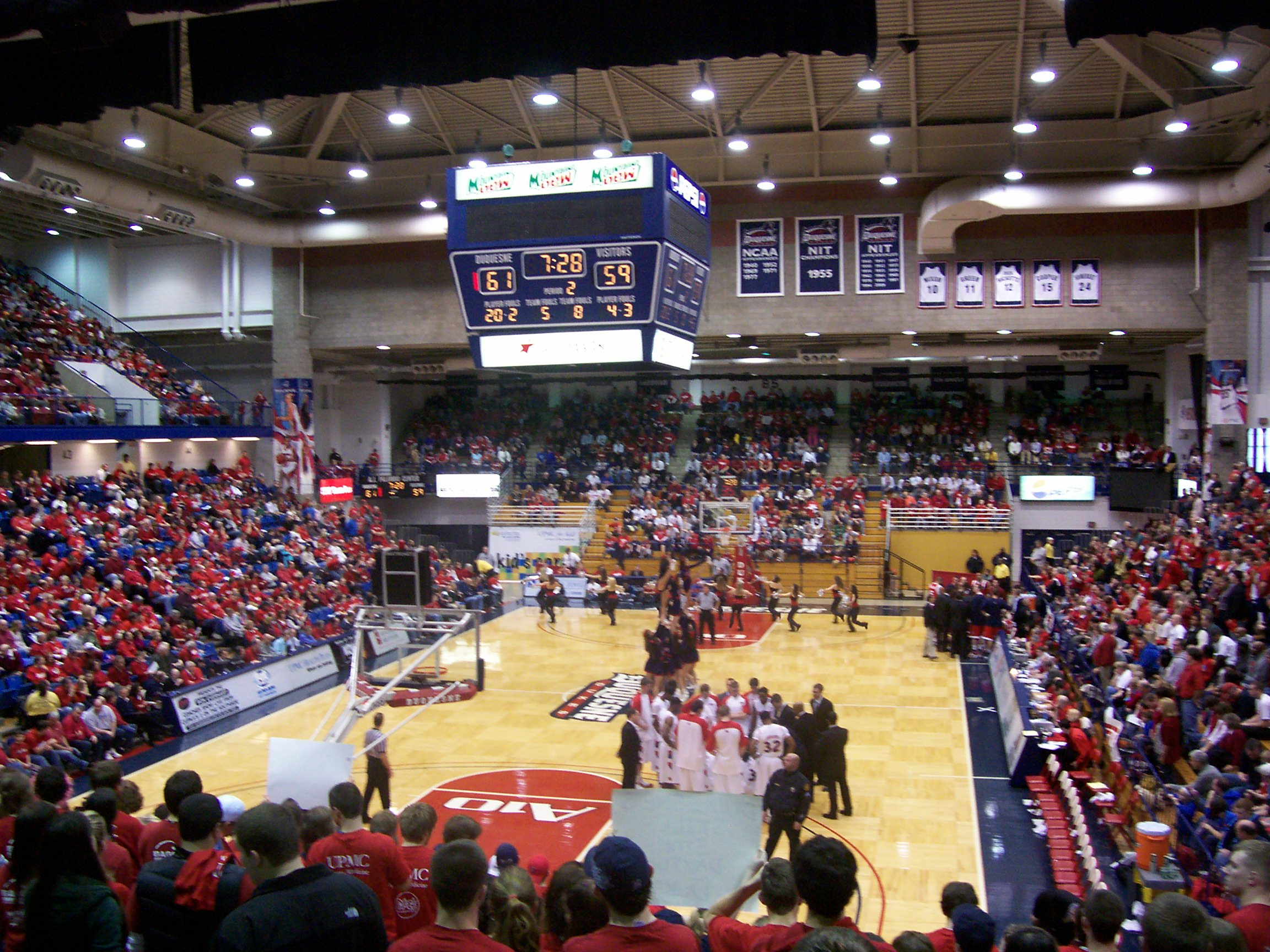
The nearly sold-out Palumbo Center during the Dayton game on February 21

As underdogs on the road against the Charlotte 49ers, the Dukes' new 10–40 strategy led them to an 83–77 upset victory. This was the first time of the season the team had managed to win two consecutive conference games. On February 21, Duquesne again returned home for a nationally televised game against the Dayton Flyers. Senior Jason Duty was honored in a pre-game ceremony, and the game's attendance of 5,144 was only 214 short of the A.J. Palumbo Center's capacity. A late layup drive by Damian Saunders put the Dukes up by one, and they went on to win 73–71.

=== Ending the regular season ===
Duquesne was unable to extend its streak on the road against St. Louis, as they lost 59–69. Bill Clark led the team with 17 points and Saunders grabbed four steals, enough to raise his per-game average to 2.9, a nation-leading figure. With this, Saunders had at one point led the nation in double-doubles, rebounds, and steals. The Dukes lost again, 80–92, in their final road game against Saint Bonaventure. The loss put a damper on Duquesne's hopes for a home game in the first round of the Atlantic 10 tournament, as they fell into a tie for the ninth seed position.

Duquesne closed its season against Fordham, who had yet to win a conference game and had only won two games all season. Fordham was hungry for a win, and a lack of effective defense on both sides led to a high scoring 111–100 victory for Duquesne. Melquan Bolding and Eric Evans both posted career high scores of 32 and 23, respectively.

== Postseason ==
After Duquesne lost to Saint Bonaventure, the Bonnies also lost their final regular season game to Xavier, which left the two teams in a tie for the eighth seed and the home tournament game that went with it. The two teams had played each other twice during the season, with each team taking one victory, so the second tiebreaker came down to who had scored the best victory. Duquesne's best win came against Charlotte, while Saint Bonaventure's was against Rhode Island. Unfortunately, those two teams were also in a tie. So for Duquesne to get their home game, Charlotte had to win their final home game, and Rhode Island had to lose. Both teams lost, so the tie remained and Rhode Island won out due to their head-to-head records. Thus Duquesne would head back out on the road against the Bonnies.

The game was played on March 9 and was close until the Bonnies went on a 14–0 run halfway into the second half, going on to win 71–83. Despite Damian Saunders posting his 20th and final double-double of the year, Duquesne's 5 for 21 performance from beyond the 3-point arc combined with St. Bonaventure's 75% 3-point shooting and two players scoring in the upper twenties put the game out of the Dukes' reach. The loss dashed Duquesne's last hopes at a bid to the NIT. However, an invitation to either the College Basketball Invitational (CBI) or CollegeInsider.com Postseason Tournament was still possible.

Early on March 15, hours after the NCAA and NIT fields were announced, Duquesne accepted a bid into the CBI. This would be Duquesne's 23rd postseason appearance and first in the CBI, which started in 2008. This also marked the first time since 1981 that the Dukes made two consecutive postseason appearances. It was announced that the Dukes would face off against the Princeton Tigers at Jadwin Gymnasium on March 17.

On Tuesday, March 16, it was announced that Junior Bill Clark had been suspended indefinitely from the team due to "conduct" issues. Clark had not attended practice the day before and would not travel to Princeton with the team for the CBI opening game on Wednesday. This would be only the second game that Bill Clark has missed in his college career.

Duquesne suffered its final disappointment of the season on March 17 as it fell to the Princeton Tigers. Bill Clark remained suspended and Damian Saunders led the team with only 14 points. Duquesne dominated the game early on, taking a 20–11 lead before Princeton came back, eventually leading 28–23 at the half. The Dukes were unable to turn the momentum and continued to fall behind, eventually losing 51–65. The absence of Bill Clark showed on defense, as the Dukes were out-rebounded heavily. The Dukes also failed to improve on their issues from the regular season, going only 8 for 18 from the free throw line and 3 for 15 from 3-point range. This loss ended the 2009 season, and all Duquesne could do was look ahead to the next year.

== Schedule ==
Date time, TV	Rank^{#}	Opponent^{#}	Result	Record	Site (attendance) city, state
November 7*; 7:00 pm		La Roche; Exhibition	W 95–48	0–0	A.J. Palumbo Center (1,819); Pittsburgh, Pennsylvania
November 13*; 7:00 pm		Nicholls State	W 85–62	1–0	A.J. Palumbo Center (2,631); Pittsburgh, Pennsylvania
November 17*; 9:05 pm, ESPNU		at Iowa; O'Reilly Auto Parts CBE Classic	W 52–50	2–0	Carver-Hawkeye Arena (7,943); Iowa City, Iowa
November 23*; 5:00 pm		vs. Binghamton; O'Reilly Auto Parts CBE Classic	W 70–52	3–0	Ramsey Center (1,073); Cullowhee, North Carolina
November 24*; 5:00 pm		vs. Arkansas-Monticello; O'Reilly Auto Parts CBE Classic	W 75–72 ^{OT}	4–0	Ramsey Center (909); Cullowhee, North Carolina
November 25*; 7:30 pm		vs. Western Carolina; O'Reilly Auto Parts CBE Classic	L 77–83	4–1	Ramsey Center (787); Cullowhee, North Carolina
November 29*; 2:00 pm		Radford	W 71–63	5–1	A.J. Palumbo Center (2,073); Pittsburgh, Pennsylvania
December 2*; 7:00 pm, CBS College Sports		vs. Pittsburgh; The City Game	L 58–67 ^{20T}	5–2	Mellon Arena (12,336); Pittsburgh, Pennsylvania
December 5*; 3:30 pm		Savannah State; Chuck Cooper Classic	W 58–44	6–2	A.J. Palumbo Center (2,780); Pittsburgh, Pennsylvania
December 9*; 7:00 pm, FSN Pittsburgh		at No. 6 West Virginia	L 39–68	6–3	WVU Coliseum (9,835); Morgantown, West Virginia
December 12*; 7:05 pm		Robert Morris	W 59–54	7–3	A.J. Palumbo Center (2,594); Pittsburgh, Pennsylvania
December 16*; 7:30 pm		Canisius	W 86–77 ^{20T}	8–3	A.J. Palumbo Center (1,922); Pittsburgh, Pennsylvania
December 19*; 7:00 pm		at IUPUI	L 64–73	8–4	The Jungle (1,088); Indianapolis, Indiana
December 22*; 7:00 pm		St. Francis (PA)	W 86–56	9–4	A.J. Palumbo Center (1,860); Pittsburgh, Pennsylvania
December 30*; 7:00 pm		at Old Dominion	L 54–63	9–5	Ted Constant Convocation Center (6,612); Norfolk, Virginia
January 6; 7:00 pm		Richmond	L 68–80	9–6 (0–1)	A. J. Palumbo Center (2,523); Pittsburgh, Pennsylvania
January 9; 2:00 pm		at Dayton	L 72–78 ^{OT}	9–7 (0–2)	University of Dayton Arena (13,435); Dayton, Ohio
January 13; 7:00 pm		Saint Louis	L 75–79 ^{2OT}	9–8 (0–3)	A. J. Palumbo Center (2,563); Pittsburgh, Pennsylvania
January 20; 7:00 pm, PCNC		at Rhode Island	L 67–75	9–9 (0–4)	Thomas M. Ryan Center (5,236); Kingston, Rhode Island
January 23; 7:00 pm		St. Bonaventure	W 70–69	10–9 (1–4)	A. J. Palumbo Center (3,208); Pittsburgh, Pennsylvania
January 28; 7:00 pm, CBS College Sports		at Xavier	L 50–86	10–10 (1–5)	Cintas Center (10,250); Cincinnati, Ohio
January 31; 4:05 pm, CBS College Sports		Saint Joseph's	W 74–71	11–10 (2–5)	A. J. Palumbo Center (3,789); Pittsburgh, Pennsylvania
February 3; 7:00 pm		at No. 19 Temple	L 60–76	11–11 (2–6)	Liacouras Center (4,391); Philadelphia, Pennsylvania
February 6; 2:00 pm		at George Washington	W 70–63	12–11 (3–6)	Robins Center (1,507); Washington, D.C.
February 11; 7:00 pm, CBS College Sports		Massachusetts	L 80–84 ^{OT}	12–12 (3–7)	A. J. Palumbo Center (2,602); Pittsburgh, Pennsylvania
February 14; 2:00 pm		La Salle	W 103–82	13–12 (4–7)	A. J. Palumbo Center (2,452); Pittsburgh, Pennsylvania
February 17; 7:00 pm, CBS College Sports		at Charlotte	W 83–77	14–12 (5–7)	Halton Arena (5,720); Charlotte, North Carolina
February 21; 1:00 pm, ESPN2		Dayton	W 73–71	15–12 (6–7)	A. J. Palumbo Center (5,144); Pittsburgh, Pennsylvania
February 27; 8:00 pm		at St. Louis	L 59–69	15–13 (6–8)	Chaifetz Arena (8,169); St. Louis, Missouri
March 3; 7:00 pm		at St. Bonaventure	L 80–92	15–14 (6–9)	Reilly Center (4,139); Olean, New York
March 5; 12:00 pm		Fordham	W 111–100	16–14 (7–9)	A.J. Palumbo Center (3,441); Pittsburgh, Pennsylvania
2010 Atlantic 10 men's basketball tournament
March 9; 7:00 pm		at St. Bonaventure; First round	L 71–83	16–15 (7–9)	Reilly Center (3,609); Olean, New York
2010 College Basketball Invitational
March 17*; 7:00 pm, HDNet		at Princeton; First round	L 51–65	16–16 (7–9)	Jadwin Gymnasium (665); Princeton, New Jersey
*Non-conference game. ^{#}Rankings from AP Poll. (#) Tournament seedings in parentheses. All times are in Eastern Time.

== Statistics ==
Duquesne was plagued by a few issues during the 2009 season. Most notable were the poor free-throw and 3-point shooting percentages. Duquesne was last in the Atlantic 10 in both of these categories at 60.8% and 26.3% respectively. Despite their poor performance shooting from beyond the 3-point line, Duquesne still shot the fourth most three-pointers of all teams in the Atlantic 10. The following chart displays player per-game average statistics for the regular season and Atlantic 10 tournament.

#	Name	Minutes	Points	Assists	Turnovers	Rebounds	Blocks	Steals	Field Goal %	3-Point %	Free Throw %	Fouls
0	Andre Marhold	6.4	0.6	0.1	0.2	0.7	0.4	0.1	.263	0	.200	.8
2	Chase Robinson	3.8	0.7	0	0.1	0.6	0	0.1	.286	.200	1.000	0.5
3	Eric Evans	31.1	10.2	3.8	2.4	2.6	0	1.3	.383	.229	.633	2.5
4	Salim Fauras	0.5	0	0.5	0.5	1.0	0	0	0	0	0	0.5
5	Morakinyo Williams	9.7	2.0	0.2	0.7	2.2	0.1	0	.435	0	.385	1.3
13	Jason Duty	27.7	5.4	1.4	0.7	2.0	0.1	0.6	.352	.342	.741	2.0
20	Sean Johnson	15	5.4	0.9	1.3	1.3	0.1	0.4	.425	.160	.678	1.6
22	David Theis	3.8	0.3	0	0.2	0.3	0.2	0.2	.200	0	0	0.8
23	Melquan Bolding	27.7	12.1	2.1	2.2	3.7	0	1.4	.409	.243	.731	1.9
25	Damian Saunders	36.6	15.0	2.5	3.0	11.3	3.0	2.8	.497	.196	.487	2.6
30	Bill Clark	32.1	14.1	2.1	2.5	6.0	0.4	1.0	.412	.279	.740	3.2
32	B.J. Monteiro	27.9	11.1	1.8	1.9	4.3	0.4	0.8	.471	.317	.505	2.7
33	Rodrigo Peggau	7.7	1.3	0.1	0.4	1.6	0	0.2	.424	0	.300	1.4
54	Oliver Lewinson	6.8	0.9	0.1	0.8	1.5	0	0.2	.500	0	.667	1.1
55	Lucas Newton	5.2	1.0	0.4	0.2	0.2	0	0.2	.444	.429	1.000	0.5

=== Awards and controversies ===
Duquesne players received a few accolades in the 2009–10 season. Junior Damian Saunders's outstanding play earned him a spot on the Atlantic 10 All-Conference First Team. He was also named the Atlantic 10 Defensive Player of the Year. Earlier in the season, Jason Duty was nominated as a finalist for the Lowe's Senior CLASS award, an award which recognizes college seniors who demonstrate exemplary outstanding performance both on the court and in the classroom. Duty, who held a 3.72 GPA as an accounting major and had already accepted a job with PricewaterhouseCoopers, was named to the Atlantic 10 All-Academic Team.

Early in the season, Damian Saunders was named Atlantic 10 (A-10) player of the week for two consecutive weeks, sharing the honors with Chris Wright of Dayton and Jordan Crawford of Xavier, respectively. Following his 34-point performance against La Salle, Bill Clark earned his first career A-10 Player of the Week award, with Richmond's Kevin Anderson.

The season was also marred by a few controversies. Prior to the beginning of play, B.J. Monteiro was arrested on October 3 in Middletown, Connecticut. He turned himself into police on suspicion of participating in the theft of a laptop, iPod, and cash from a house during a party in early August. He was charged with third-degree larceny and, on October 6, he was suspended indefinitely from the team. Following his court appearance on October 13, all charges were dropped and Monteiro was reinstated to the team.

In late January, Junior Bill Clark was benched for the game against Rhode Island as the NCAA investigated a potential secondary rules violation. The specific details of the incident were not released by Duquesne, even after Clark's return to the team the next day. A secondary rules violation is defined as "one that is isolated or inadvertent in nature, provides or is intended to provide only a minimal recruiting, competitive or other advantage."

In the postseason, Bill Clark was again suspended, this time by coach Everhart for a conduct issue. The day before the CBI game against Princeton, Everhart announced that Clark would not travel to the game or participate in any practices or team activities until he felt the student ready to return. Clark was reinstated two weeks later, and, as before, no details were revealed.
