= Pete Suder =

American baseball player (1916–2006)

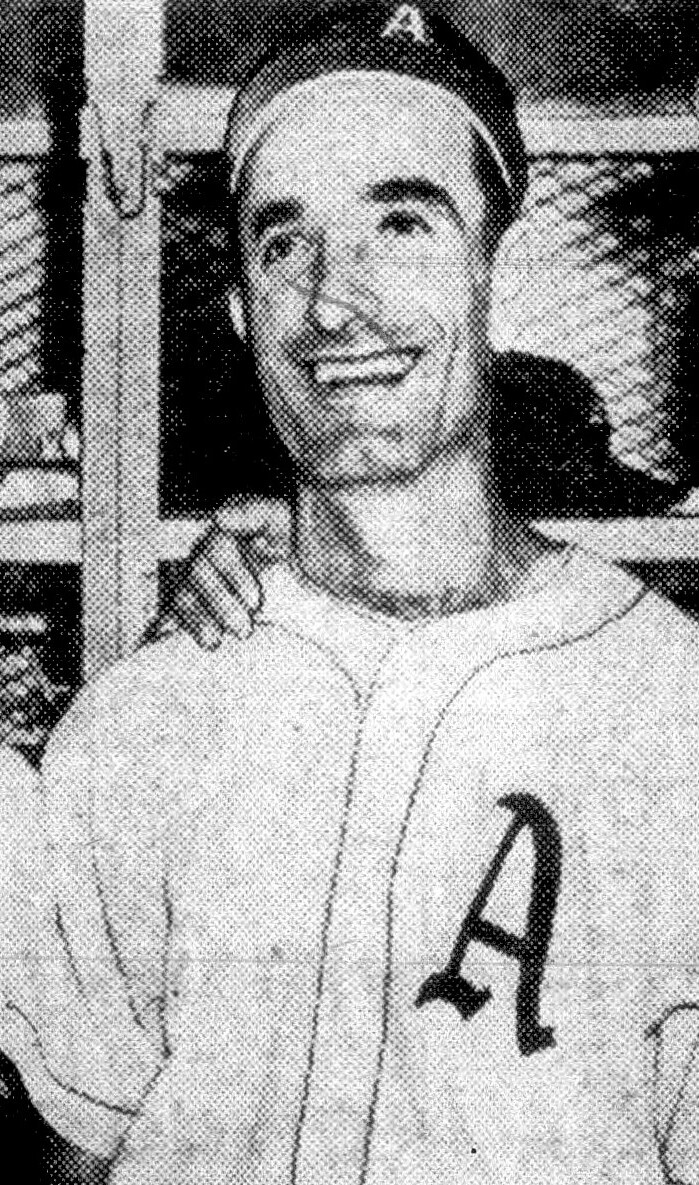
- Suder, circa 1949
- Infielder
- Born: April 16, 1916; Aliquippa, Pennsylvania, U.S.
- Died: November 14, 2006 (aged 90); Aliquippa, Pennsylvania, U.S.
- Batted: Right Threw: Right

MLB debut
- April 15, 1941, for the Philadelphia Athletics

Last MLB appearance
- May 30, 1955, for the Kansas City Athletics

MLB statistics
- Batting average: .249
- Home runs: 49
- Runs batted in: 541
- Stats at Baseball Reference

Teams
- Philadelphia / Kansas City Athletics (1941–1943, 1946–1955)

Peter Suder (April 16, 1916 – November 14, 2006), nicknamed "Pecky", was an American professional baseball player, a utility infielder for the Philadelphia / Kansas City Athletics (1941–43, 1946–55).

He threw and batted right-handed, stood 6 feet (1.8 m) tall and weighed 180 pounds (82 kg).

== Biography ==
Born in Aliquippa, Pennsylvania, on April 16, 1916, Peter Suder was the eighth of ten children born to Božidar ("Bogić") and Smilja (née Šegan) Sučević. Sučević emigrated from Serbia before the turn of the 20th century, and worked at a steel mill in Monessen, Pennsylvania. After three years, he sent for his Serbian wife.

Peter Suder's twenty-year career in baseball began in 1935. He led the American League in grounding into double plays (23) in 1941 before his career was interrupted in 1944 and 1945 by his World War II service in the United States Army in the European Theater of Operations.

After completing his military service, Suder returned home, resumed his baseball career, and became the Athletics' all-time leader in grounding into double plays (158). In the field, Suder was a member of the 1949 Philadelphia Athletics team that set a Major League team record of 217 double plays, a record which still stood as of 2010. He participated in 94 double plays that year, 85 as a second baseman (where he platooned with future Baseball Hall of Famer Nellie Fox) and nine at third base.

In 13 seasons, he played in 1,421 games, had 5,085 at bats, 469 runs, 1,268 hits, 210 doubles, 44 triples, 49 home runs, 541 runs batted in, 19 stolen bases, 288 bases on balls, a .249 batting average, .290 on-base percentage, .337 slugging percentage, 1,713 total bases and 92 sacrifice hits.

== Family and death ==
Suder died in Aliquippa on November 14, 2006. He was 90 years old. He is the grandfather of All-Atlantic 10 Conference basketball player Rick Suder, who played for Duquesne, and the great-grandfather of Miami of Ohio basketball player Peter Suder.

== See also ==
- List of Major League Baseball players who spent their entire career with one franchise
- Johnny Miljus
- Nick Strincevich
- Doc Medich
- Walt Dropo
- Eli Grba
- Steve Swetonic
- Babe Martin
- Dave Rajsich
- Gary Rajsich
