= Peter Suder =

American basketball player (born 2003)

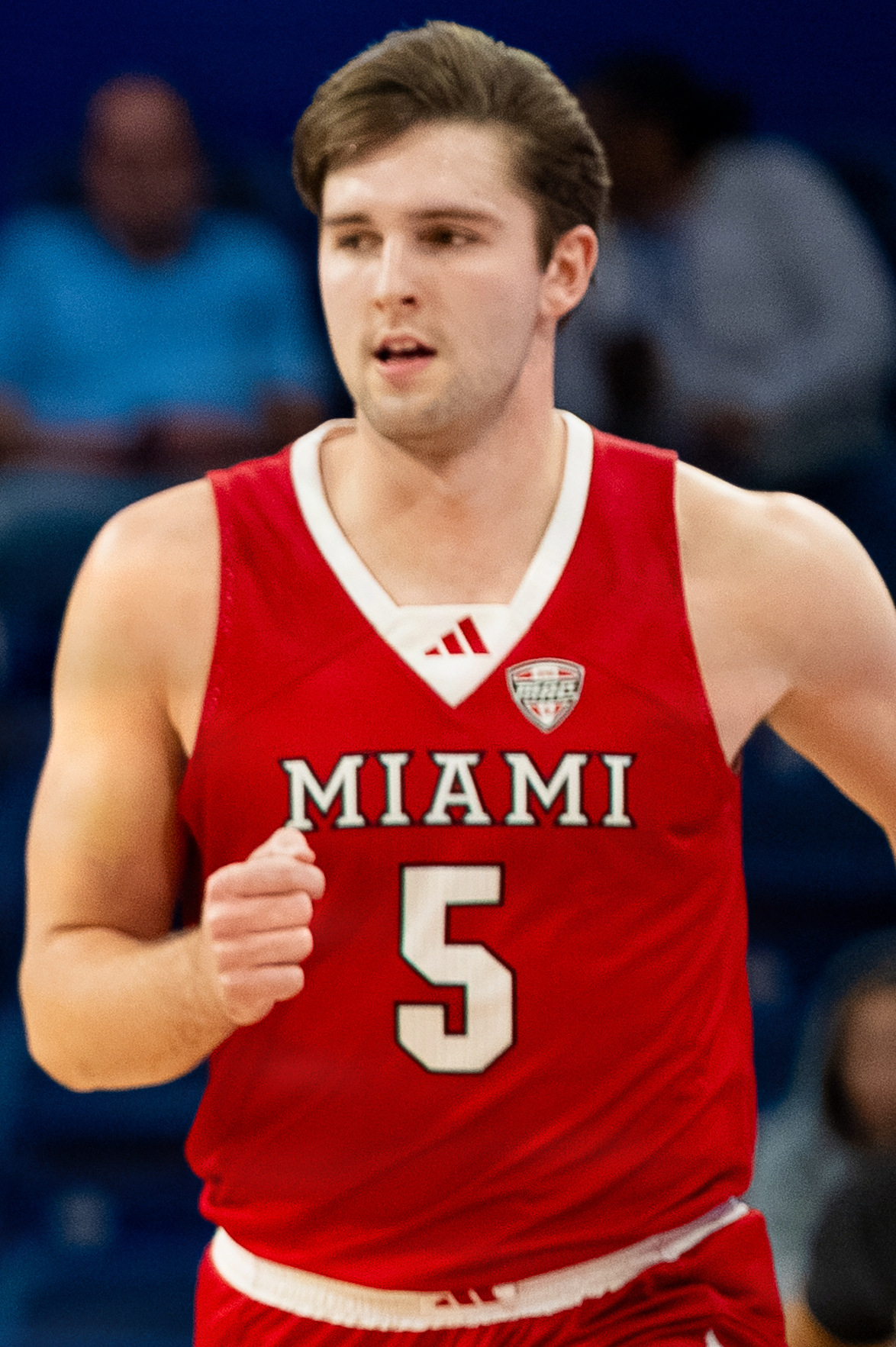
- Suder with Miami (Ohio) in 2025

No. 3 – Windy City Bulls
- Position: Shooting guard
- League: NBA G League

Personal information
- Born: July 29, 2003 (age 23) Carmel, Indiana, U.S.
- Listed height: 6 ft 5 in (1.96 m)
- Listed weight: 215 lb (98 kg)

Career information
- High school: Carmel (Carmel, Indiana)
- College: Bellarmine (2022–2024); Miami (Ohio) (2024–2026)
- NBA draft: 2026: undrafted
- Playing career: 2026–present

Career history
- 2026–present: Windy City Bulls

Career highlights
- MAC Player of the Year (2026); 2× First-team All-MAC (2025, 2026); ASUN All-Freshman team (2023)
- Stats at NBA.com
- Stats at Basketball Reference

Peter Jovan Suder (born July 29, 2003) is an American professional basketball player for the Windy City Bulls of the NBA G League. He played college basketball for the Bellarmine Knights and Miami RedHawks.

He earned 2023 ASUN All-Freshman honors. He was the leading scorer and a 2025 first team All-MAC honoree for the first 25-win Miami Redhawks basketball team (2024–25) as well as both the Pre-Season MAC Player of the year and post season MAC Player of the Year for the record-setting 2025–26 Miami RedHawks men's basketball team.

In high school he was a starter on Carmel High School's 2019 and 2021 Indiana High School Athletic Association (IHSAA) state champion basketball teams as a freshman and junior. He is the son of basketball player Rick Suder and the great-grandson of baseball player Pete Suder.

== Early life and high school career ==
In March 2003, the Suder family reportedly lived in Indianapolis, Indiana, and had a 16-month old daughter named Kaitlyn. By 2010, Suder's father Rick and mother Kimberly Ann were residents of Carmel, Indiana.

Peter Suder entered his 2018–19 freshman season listed at 6 ft 2 in (1.88 m). In the 2019 IHSAA semifinals Carmel defeated Penn High School 71–42 and Suder tied for the team high with 15 points. In Carmel's (26–1) 2019 IHSAA Class 4A Championship game 60–55 victory over Ben Davis High School, he posted a team-high 14 points, team-high 3 steals, 7 rebounds, 3 assists and a block. Although Suder led the team in scoring for the game, the team was mostly dominated by seniors.

In 2020, Carmel had an 18–7 record going into the regional round of the IHSAA tournament, but COVID canceled the tournament. In the 2021 IHSAA playoffs, his team defeated Lawrence North High School 51–46 in overtime for the state championship with a 26–2 record. Along the way, the team defeated a Braden Smith led Westfield High School team 53–27. The Indiana Basketball Coaches Association voted Suder to the 2021 12-player boys IndyStar Junior All-Star team.

Suder's school had won five state championships in the 10 seasons prior to his senior season. In January 2022, Smith led Westfield to a 43–42 victory over Carmel with a 28–point performance including a layup with 13.1 seconds for the schools first victory over Carmel since 2015. In a February 7, 2022 rematch against Lawrence North High School, Suder posted a career-high 33 points to surpass 1000 career points. As a senior in 2022, his team had never lost an IHSAA state tournament game until they ran into Smith's Westfield team. After falling behind by 13 points early in the second half, Carmel took a 46–43 lead only to lose 59–54. Suder's team-high 14 points was overshadowed by Smith's game-high 22. The Indiana Basketball Coaches Association voted Suder to the 2022 14-player boys Indiana All-Stars team. He ended his career with 1,062 points and 572 rebounds, and Carmel was 88–17 during his tenure.

=== Recruiting ===
Suder regards himself as a "blue collar" player because of rebounding, defense and overall hustle. He notes that he does not boast a 20+ scoring average himself but his blue collar efforts impact the score of others. Indianapolis Star reporter Kyle Neddenriep agrees with this assessment noting in February 2022 that "Suder's impact is often in areas other than scoring. He leads the team in rebounds, steals and assists..." Suder's coach say notes his willingness to take on any task or assignment. Suder says the toughest basketball player he ever played against was Dawand Jones who went on to become an offensive tackle in the National Football League (NFL) because of Jones' size and agility. Jones was 6 ft 8 in (2.03 m) 360 pounds (163 kg) when he was at Ben Davis High School during Suder's freshman season.

By June 2020, Suder was contacted by Duquesne, his father's alma mater. He was recruited by several MAC schools, New Orleans, Furman, Wright State and other programs, but Bellarmine head coach Scott Davenport showed significantly more interest than other coaches and he had been advised by his parents to find a program that wants him rather than focus on the schools that he wants.

== College career ==
=== Bellarmine ===
The 2022–23 Bellarmine Knights opened the season with a 67–66 upset of Louisville on November 9. It was Bellarmine's first victory against Louisville in 13 meetings. In Bellarmine's next game on November 12, Suder established a career high of 24 points in a 62–55 loss to Morehead State. In a January 26 72–71 victory over Eastern Kentucky, Suder posted a career-high 11 rebounds, 10 points and a team-high 5 assists. On January 30, 2023, Suder became the first Bellarmine Knight to be named ASUN Conference Men's Basketball Newcomer of the Week for a week in which he averaged 10.0 points, 8.5 rebounds and 5.0 assists. Bellarmine had jumped to NCAA Division I for the 2020–21 NCAA Division I men's basketball season. On February 2, he matched his career-high with 24 points in a double-overtime loss against Kennesaw State, and this would be his season high. Suder posted a team-high 16 points and team-high 8 rebounds in a February 19, 2023 68–67 victory over Central Arkansas. On February 27, 2023, Suder, who started all but one game, was named to the ASUN All-Freshman Team following a season in which he posted 11.6 points and 4.9 rebounds in ASUN competition. Overall he averaged 9.9 points, 4.3 rebounds, 2.6 assists and 1.1 steals averages as a freshman.

On November 14, 2023, in a loss against Chattanooga, Suder posted 21 points and 4 steals, which would be his season high and career high, respectively. In the February 22, 2024 68–65 victory over Central Arkansas, Suder posted a team-high 20 points and three steels. Suder averaged 10.5 points, 4.3 rebounds, 3.3 assists, and 1.2 steals as a sophomore before transferring to Miami. In his Bellarmine career, he scored 644 points across 63 games.

=== Miami ===
During the November 26, 2024 75–72 victory over Mercer, Suder posted a team-high 16 points, 6 rebounds and four steals. On December 2, Suder posted a career-high 42 points against the Air Force. It was the most points by a Redhawk at Millett Hall, their home court, and the most by a Redhawk player since Wally Szczerbiak scored 43 in 1999, which helped him earn MAC Co-Player of the Week. On February 22, Suder achieved his 1000th career point by making all 10 of his free throws and a crucial late three point shot as well as posting 22 points, 5 rebounds and 6 assists in an overtime victory against Kent State. Following the 2024–25 Mid-American Conference men's basketball season, Suder was named to the All-MAC first team. He was the first RedHawk to earn the honor since Julian Mavunga in 2012. In the 2025 MAC men's basketball tournament quarterfinals, he nearly secured the second triple-double (Ron Harper, 1986) in school history with season-high 10 rebounds, career-high 10 assists and 7 points against Eastern Michigan. In the semifinals, he posted 23 points and a career-high 11 rebounds against Kent State, leading Miami to a school-record 25th victory. It was Miami's first Mid-American Conference men's basketball tournament championship game since the 2006–07 Miami RedHawks men's basketball team won the 2007 MAC men's basketball tournament. In the championship game loss 76–74 to Akron, Suder posted 24 points and was named to the All-tournament team. After averaging 13.7 points, 4.9 rebounds, 3.8 assists and 1.3 steals, Suder opted to return rather than pursue the NCAA transfer portal.

On September 8, 2025, the Blue Ribbon College Basketball Yearbook named Suder to its Preseason All-MAC team as its Preseason Player of the year with Miami predicted as the conference runner-up. On October 21, 2025, Suder was named Preseason first-team All-MAC by the conference coaches as Miami was again predicted to finish second out of 13 teams (receiving 2 of 13 first place votes). On December 16, 2025, Miami defeated Wright State 83–76 for its 11th consecutive victory to set a school record for best start with Suder contributing 10 points, including a team-high 8 in the second half. On January 6, Miami defeated 2025–26 Western Michigan Broncos 87–76 to notch a school record 24th consecutive home win with Suder contributing 12 points. On January 17, 2026, Suder posted a season-high 37 points (including 7-for-10 three point shooting) against Buffalo, including the overtime game winning three point shot, to secure the Miami Redhawks 19th consecutive win to start the season, which tied the 1975–76 Western Michigan Broncos men's basketball team for the best start in MAC history. The game was close throughout and featured 27 lead changes and 8 ties. Following the victory, Miami entered the 2025–26 basketball rankings in the AP Poll for the first time since the 1998–99 Miami RedHawks men's basketball team did so. Although he did not earn the MAC Men's Basketball Player of the Week, Suder's performance was recognized as the MAC Male Scholar-Athlete of the Week. On January 20, Suder led Miami to a 20–0 start with an overtime victory over Kent State on the road with a game-high 27 points, team-high 10 rebounds and game-high 8 assists, breaking the MAC record for consecutive wins to start a season (20) and the school record for consecutive road wins (9). On January 27, with starting point guard Evan Ipsaro already lost for the season, and backup point guard Luke Skaljac sidelined due to an illness, Suder posted 13 points and a season-high tying 9 assists in an 86–84 victory against UMass, extending the MAC record for consecutive wins to start a season to 21 and tying the 2001–02 Kent State Golden Flashes for the longest in-season winning streak in MAC history. Suder posted 20 points on February 13 in a victory against Battle of the Bricks rival Ohio, to reach 29 consecutive home wins, 25–0 and a 12–0 conference start, to gave Miami its best conference start since the 1957–58 Miami RedHawks. 23 points from Suder helped Miami reach both 13–0 in conference play and more than 25 wins (26–0) for the first time in school history with an 86–77 win on February 17 against UMass. On February 24 against Eastern Michigan, Suder posted his second double-double (13 points and a game-high 10 rebounds) of the season and surpassed 1500 career points.

On March 3, the team defeated Toledo 74–72, clinching the 2025–26 MAC regular season, its first conference regular season championship since the 2004–05 Miami RedHawks. Suder contributed 19 points (on 7-for-10 shooting, including 4-for-7 on threes), four rebounds, four assists, three steals, and a block. The win set the conference record for consecutive MAC conference games wins at 17, surpassing the 1956–57 Miami Redskins. (Note: This published record is in discord with Sports Reference, which shows the 56-57 team won its first 7 conference games and the 55-56 team won its last two conference games.) (Note: The 2012–13 & 2024–25 Akron Zips men's basketball teams are both known to have started the MAC conference schedule with 13–0 records.) On March 6 against Battle of the Bricks rival Ohio, Suder helped Miami become the third team (2013–14 Wichita State & 2014–15 Kentucky) to achieve a 31–0 undefeated regular season with 5 of his 13 points and of his team's 10 points in overtime. It was the school's 1500th win. Suder's performance included the go-ahead free throws with 12 seconds left. He accounted for 2 other overtime points via an assist to Trey Perry. Following the regular season, Suder was named to the All-MAC First Team and selected as MAC Player of the Year. He was Miami's first player of the year since Michael Bramos in 2009. During the 2026 NCAA tournament March 18 First Four 89–79 victory against SMU, Suder led Miami in rebounds (7) and assists (6). He was Miami's only double-digit scorer with 27 points in the first round loss to 23rd-ranked Tennessee.

Suder was invited to participate in the April 3, 2026 NABC-Reese's Division I College All-Star Game at Lucas Oil Stadium on Final Four Friday. Suder was named to the 2025-26 Men's Basketball Academic All-MAC Team. He was also invited to participate in the April 15–18, 2026 Portsmouth Invitational Tournament at Churchland High School. On May 1, the NBA announced its 73 player May 10–17 NBA draft combine invitation list, which included Suder.

== Professional career ==
After going undrafted in the 2026 NBA draft, Suder signed a Two-way contract with the Los Angeles Lakers. He was included on the Lakers' 2026 NBA Summer League roster. On July 21, 2026, the Lakers waived him from his two-way contract to make space for Arthur Kaluma.

On September 25, 2026, the Chicago Bulls announced that Suder was part of their training camp roster. Suder was waived on October 2 to make way for Isaiah Stevens. On October 25, he was named to the Windy City Bulls training camp roster.

== Personal life ==
Suder is the son of Rick Suder. Rick was a two-time 1980s All-Atlantic 10 Conference basketball player, and Rick is the grandson of 1940s and 1950s Major League Baseball infielder Pete Suder.

== Career statistics ==
Legend
GP	Games played	GS	Games started	MPG	Minutes per game
FG%	Field goal percentage	3P%	3-point field goal percentage	FT%	Free throw percentage
RPG	Rebounds per game	APG	Assists per game	SPG	Steals per game
BPG	Blocks per game	PPG	Points per game	**Bold**	Career high

=== College ===
College statistics
Year	Team	GP	GS	MPG	FG%	3P%	FT%	RPG	APG	SPG	BPG	PPG
2022–23	Bellarmine	32	32	28.1	.450	.273	**.789**	4.3	2.6	1.1	.2	9.9
2023–24	Bellarmine	31	31	**32.0**	.411	.240	.725	4.3	3.3	1.2	.3	10.5
2024–25	Miami (OH)	**34**	**34**	29.6	.497	.351	.777	**4.9**	3.8	**1.3**	**.4**	13.7
2025–26	Miami (OH)	33	33	31.1	**.546**	**.421**	.734	4.6	**4.0**	**1.3**	**.4**	**14.8**
Career		130	130	30.2	.479	.331	.754	4.5	3.4	1.2	.3	12.3

== See also ==
- Miami RedHawks men's basketball statistical leaders
