= Rick Suder =

American basketball player and businessman

Personal information
- Born: c. 1964 (age 61–62)
- Listed height: 6 ft 4 in (1.93 m)

Career information
- High school: Central Valley (Center Township, Pennsylvania)
- College: Duquesne (1982–1986)
- NBA draft: 1986: undrafted

Career highlights
- AP Honorable Mention All-American (1986); First-team All-Atlantic 10 (1986); Second-team All-Atlantic 10 (1985)

Rick Suder Jr. (born c. 1964) is an American retired athlete who played college basketball for Duquesne of the Atlantic 10 Conference (A-10) from 1982 to 1986. He holds the Duquesne single-season and career free throw percentage records as well as the A-10 career free throw percentage record. Suder formerly held the school single-game assists record. He led the A-10 in scoring and free throw percentage for the 1985–86 season. Suder graduated from Center High School before attending college locally at Duquesne. Following his basketball career, he had a career in business and became a financial advisor. Suder is the grandson of Major League Baseball infielder Pete Suder and father of Mid-American Conference Men's Basketball Player of the Year Peter Suder.

== Early life ==
Rick Suder attended a basketball camp at Robert Morris University where he learned free throw shooting from Calvin Murphy who emphasized making the shot one motion. Suder is from Center Township, Beaver County, Pennsylvania. Like Pete Maravich, Suder has Serbian heritage and claims roots from nearby Aliquippa, Pennsylvania. He attended Center High School in Monaca, Pennsylvania— which merged into Central Valley High School in 2010— before matriculating to Duquesne, where he would earn the nickname "Suder the Shooter". He committed to Duquesne on April 18, 1982. Suder was a 1982 Pittsburgh Post-Gazette Fabulous 5 selection from the Western Pennsylvania Interscholastic Athletic League (WPIAL) and the Pittsburgh Public Schools. According to the Beaver County Sports Hall of Fame, he was also an (All-Area, Pittsburgh) first team selection by the Pittsburgh Press.

== College career ==
When Suder tallied 11 assists on February 11, 1984, as a sophomore against Saint Joseph's, it tied Andy Sisinni's single-game school record set two months earlier on December 10, 1983. The record was surpassed by Brian Shanahan on December 14, 1986.

=== Junior season ===
In January 1985, a rape trial commenced involving four suspended players on the team. Suder's first 30-point game occurred when he scored 30 points in the opening round of the 1985 Atlantic 10 men's basketball tournament against Penn State on March 6, 1985. He led Duquesne in both free throw percentage and scoring as a junior. Suder was a 1985 second team All-A-10 selection when his 17.7 points per game was third in the conference. During the offseason, Duquesne basketball went through two player expulsions and two additional suspensions following the rape trial, which hampered the team with cascading effects.

=== Senior season ===
Prior to his senior season Suder was a selection for the media's preseason first team All A-10 team, along with Maurice Martin, Rod Blake, Nate Blackwell and Dale Blaney. Suder scored 34 points against Penn State on January 11, 1986. He was a 1986 NCAA Men's Basketball All-American honorable mention selection by the Associated Press, after being among the 1985–86 NCAA Division I statistical leaders. Suder led Duquesne in steals, free throw percentage and scoring as a senior. Following his senior season, he was a first team All-A-10 selection (with Blaney, Martin, Blake and Barry Mungar) when his 20.5 scoring average and 91.8% free throw percentage both led the conference. The 91.8% ranked second among A-10 single-season free throw percentages but fell to fourth by the time of the A-10 2019–20 Media Guide. Although Duquesne was eliminated in the semi-finals, Suder was a member of the All-tournament team for the 1986 Atlantic 10 men's basketball tournament.

=== Legacy ===
According to the A-10 2019–20 Media Guide records, Suder is the A-10 career free throw percentage leader (342–390 87.69%, 1983–86, min 2.5 FT/game). Suder's career percentage was listed among the top 25 in the NCAA Division I record book until the 2006 edition. In the 2007 edition JJ Redick (662–726=91.2%) and Gerry McNamara (435–490=88.8%) displaced him from the list. Suder's 1985–86 (135–147=91.8%) and 1984–85 (139–157=88.5%) single-season free throw percentages rank first and second in Duquesne basketball history.

Suder was inducted into the Duquesne's Sports Hall of Fame on January 13, 1995. He was a class of 2002 inductee into the Beaver County, Sports Hall of Fame. The Beaver County Times noted that he was a 2017 inductee into the Pittsburgh Basketball Club Hall of Fame.

== Professional career ==
=== Basketball ===
Suder was invited to the July 1986 Philadelphia 76ers three-day rookie and free-agent training camp hosted by St. Joseph's University. The camp had 7 rookies, 8 veteran free agents and 4 other veterans. Although practices were not open, daily scrimmages with 10-minute quarters were open to the paying public. In the final day scrimmage, Suder had 18 points. Roster cuts were made that evening paring the 19 attendees down to 10 or 11 (including the 4 veterans). In September 1986, Suder signed with the Cincinnati Slammers of the Continental Basketball Association.

=== Business ===
In 1988, Suder and business partner Gary Sullivan acquired a 50% stake in the Hader Hardware chain of the Cincinnati metropolitan and Northern Kentucky region. In 1993, they acquired the remaining 50%. By the time of a 1996 acquisition of the chain, it had 15 locations and 200 employees.

In 2001, Suder was one of three agents of Worldwide Financial Management Group LLC, which reached a consent decree with the Indiana Securities Divisions following allegations of numerous securities law violations. The agents each agreed to become licensed before serving as investment advisers and the LLC, which is a financial advisory service provider to professional athletes, would forgo reinstatement of its investment adviser license for three years. At that time he was managing a mortgage company and facilitating smooth immigration for Eastern European athletes into the United States.

Suder became a professional investment advisor. In 2009, he was a named defendant in Predrag Danilović's federal complaint in Danilovic v. Worldwide Associates, LLC et al, which was filed February 9, and was also sued by Dejan Bodiroga and Zeljko Rebraca on April 9. All three litigants were 1990s NBA draftees from Serbia, with two having playing experience in the National Basketball Association. Both suits were for investment fraud. Suder claimed that poor investment results were due to the 2008 financial crisis.

== Personal life ==
Suder is the grandson of Pete Suder, who was a Major League Baseball infielder for the Philadelphia / Kansas City Athletics and is notable for platooning with Nellie Fox as part of a double play record-setting infield. His son, Peter, was a Carmel High School Class of 2022 signee for the Bellarmine Knights men's basketball team. Peter was a 2023 ASUN All-Freshman honoree before transferring to the Miami RedHawks men's basketball program and becoming a 2025 first-team Mid-American Conference selection and 2026 Mid-American Conference Men's Basketball Player of the Year. Suder has relatives in Yugoslavia. His wife's name is Kimberly Ann Suder. By March 2003, he had settled in Indianapolis with his wife, Kim, and 16-month-old daughter, Kaitlyn. As of May 1, 2010, Suder was living in the Indianapolis suburb of Carmel, Indiana.

== See also ==
- 1986 NCAA Men's Basketball All-Americans
- Duquesne Dukes men's basketball statistical leaders
