= 1977 National Invitation Tournament =

Edition of USA college basketball tournament

- Season: 1976–77
- Teams: 16
- Finals site: Madison Square Garden, New York City
- Champions: St. Bonaventure Bonnies (1st title)
- Runner-up: Houston Cougars (1st title game)
- Semifinalists: Villanova Wildcats (4th semifinal); Alabama Crimson Tide (2nd semifinal)
- Winning coach: Jim Satalin (1st title)
- MVP: Greg Sanders (St. Bonatenture)

The 1977 National Invitation Tournament was the 1977 edition of the annual NCAA college basketball competition.

== Selected teams ==
Below is a list of the 16 teams selected for the tournament. This was the first edition of the tournament in which early round games were played at campus sites.

- Alabama
- Creighton
- Georgetown
- Houston
- Illinois State
- Indiana State
- Massachusetts
- Memphis State
- Old Dominion
- Oral Roberts
- Oregon
- Rutgers
- St. Bonaventure
- Seton Hall
- Villanova
- Virginia Tech

== Bracket ==
Below is the tournament bracket.

First Round
Alabama	86
Memphis State	63
Virginia Tech	83
Georgetown	79
Illinois State	65
Creighton	58
Houston	83
Indiana State	82
Villanova	71
Old Dominion	68
Massachusetts	86
Seton Hall	85
Oregon	90
Oral Roberts	89
St. Bonaventure	79
Rutgers	77

Quarterfinals
Alabama	79
Virginia Tech	72
Illinois State	90
Houston	91
Villanova	81
Massachusetts	71
Oregon	73
St. Bonaventure	76

Semifinals
Alabama	76
Houston	82
Villanova	82
St. Bonaventure	86

Finals
Houston	91
St. Bonaventure	94

Third place game
Alabama	89
Villanova	102

== See also ==
- 1977 NCAA Division I basketball tournament
- 1977 NCAA Division II basketball tournament
- 1977 NCAA Division III basketball tournament
- 1977 NAIA Division I men's basketball tournament
- 1977 National Women's Invitational Tournament
