= 1977 Eastern 8 men's basketball tournament =

- Classification: Division I
- Season: 1976–77
- Teams: 8
- Site: The Spectrum; Philadelphia, Pennsylvania
- Champions: Duquesne (1st title)
- Winning coach: John Cinicola (1st title)
- MVP: Norm Nixon (Duquesne)

1976–77 Eastern 8 men's basketball standings
	Conf.				Overall
Team	W		L	PCT	W		L	PCT
East
Rutgers	7	–	1	.875	18	–	10	.643
Villanova	6	–	1	.857	23	–	10	.697
George Washington	5	–	3	.625	14	–	12	.538
UMass	3	–	4	.429	20	–	11	.645
West
West Virginia	5	–	5	.500	18	–	11	.621
Penn State	5	–	5	.500	11	–	15	.423
Duquesne †	3	–	7	.300	15	–	15	.500
Pittsburgh	1	–	9	.100	6	–	21	.222
† 1977 Eastern 8 Tournament winner Rankings from AP Poll

The 1977 Eastern 8 men's basketball tournament was the first edition of the men's basketball postseason competition now known as the Atlantic 10 men's basketball tournament. It was organized by the Eastern Collegiate Basketball League, popularly known as the "Eastern 8", an NCAA Division I basketball-only conference that was formally founded in 1975 and began competition in the 1976–77 season. The conference added sports other than basketball starting with the 1977–78 school year, changing its name to the Eastern Athletic Association, and adopted its current name of Atlantic 10 Conference in 1982.

The inaugural tournament winner was the Duquesne team.

== Bracket ==
First round March 2, 1977; Philadelphia
1	Rutgers	74
8	UMass	78
4	Duquesne	65
5	Penn State	55
2	Villanova	80
7	George Washington	72
3	West Virginia	66
6	Pittsburgh	54

Semi-finals; March 4, 1977; Philadelphia
8	UMass	65
4	Duquesne	82
2	Villanova	83
3	West Virginia	75

Finals; March 5, 1977; Philadelphia
4	Duquesne	57
2	Villanova	54
