= Bill Clark (basketball) =

American retired basketball player

Personal information
- Born: April 15, 1988 (age 38) Redondo Beach, California
- Listed height: 195 cm (6 ft 5 in)
- Listed weight: 93 kg (205 lb)

Career information
- High school: Oak Hill Academy (Mouth of Wilson, Virginia); Worcester Academy (Worcester, Massachusetts)
- College: Duquesne (2007–2011)
- NBA draft: 2011: undrafted
- Playing career: 2011–2017
- Position: Small forward

Career history
- 2013–2014: MBC Mykolaiv
- 2014–2015: Provence
- 2015: Donar
- 2015–2016: Caen
- 2017: Chorale Roanne

Career highlights
- Dutch Cup champion (2015)

William Clinton Clark (born April 15, 1988) is an American retired basketball player. He played four seasons collegiate for the Duquesne Dukes men's basketball team. He usually played as small forward.

== College career ==
In the 2010–11 season, Clark was named the best player of the NABC District.

== Professional career ==
Clark played for MBC Mykolaiv in Ukraine during the 2013–14 season.

For the 2014–15 season, he signed with Fos Ouest Provence Basket of the French Pro B.

In January 2015, he signed with Donar of the Dutch DBL. With Donar, he won the NBB Cup.

After playing one more season in France with Caen Basket Calvados and a short stint with Chorale Roanne Basket, Clark retired in 2017.
