= Alexander Hogarty =

American sports coach, athletics administrator (1888–1955)

Biographical details
- Born: November 11, 1888; Lexington, Kentucky, U.S.
- Died: April 9, 1955 (aged 66); Boynton Beach, Florida, U.S.

Playing career

Football
- 1909: St. Mary's (KY)
- 1918: Dayton Triangles
- Positions: Halfback, quarterback

Coaching career (HC unless noted)

Football
- 1910–1911: Lexington HS (KY)
- 1912: Morris Harvey
- 1913: Bethany (WV)

Basketball
- 1910–1912: Lexington HS (KY)
- 1913–1914: Duquesne

Baseball
- 1911–1912: Lexington HS (KY)

Administrative career (AD unless noted)
- 1910–1912: Lexington HS (KY)
- 1912: Morris Harvey
- 1913: Duquesne
- 1918: Camp Taylor (KY)

Head coaching record
- Overall: 5–7 (college football); 7–2 (college basketball)

Alexander Joseph Hogarty (November 11, 1888 – April 9, 1955) was an American football player, coach of football, basketball, baseball, and track and field coach, and athletics administrator.

== Early life and education ==
Hogarty was born on November 11, 1888, in Lexington, Kentucky. He attended St. Mary's College in St. Mary, Kentucky, and pursued graduate studies at Battle Creek College in Battle Creek, Michigan, the University of Illinois, and Northwestern University. In 1909, Hogarty starred as quarterback or the football team at St. Mary's.

== Coaching career ==
From 1910 to 1912, Hogarty was the athletic director and coach at Lexington High School in his hometown of Lexington, Kentucky. In 1912, he was hired as the athletic director at Morris Harvey College—now known as the University of Charleston–in Charleston, West Virginia. He also served as head coach of the 1912 Morris Harvey football team.

Hogarty was the head football coach at Bethany College in Bethany, West Virginia in 1913. In December 1913, Hogarty was appointed as the first athletic director at Duquesne University in Pittsburgh. He was also Duquesne's head basketball coach for the 1913–14 season.

In October 1918, he accepted a position as athletic director at Camp Taylor in Louisville, Kentucky.

== Professional football ==
Hogarty spent one season playing for the Dayton Triangles of the Ohio League in 1918. He played both quarterback and halfback.

== Death ==
Hogarty died on April 9, 1955, at his home in Boynton Beach, Florida.

== Head coaching record ==
=== College football ===
Year	Team	Overall	Conference	Standing	Bowl/playoffs
Morris Harvey (Independent) (1912)
1912	Morris Harvey	3–1			
Morris Harvey:		3–1			
Bethany Bison (Independent) (1913)
1913	Bethany	2–6			
Bethany:		2–6			
Total:		5–7			
