= Paul Widowitz =

American basketball player

Personal information
- Born: October 8, 1917 Pittsburgh, Pennsylvania, U.S.
- Died: October 29, 2007 (aged 90) Wixom, Michigan, U.S.
- Listed height: 6 ft 1 in (1.85 m)
- Listed weight: 170 lb (77 kg)

Career information
- High school: Fifth Avenue (Pittsburgh, Pennsylvania)
- College: Duquesne (1938–1941)
- Playing career: 1941–1947
- Position: Forward

Career history
- 1941–1942: Detroit Eagles
- 1942: Saratoga
- 1942: Hagerstown Conoco Oilers
- 1945–1946: Cleveland Allmen Transfers
- 1945–1947: Detroit Mansfields

Career highlights
- 2× Second-team All-American – MSG (1940, 1941)

Paul J. Widowitz (October 8, 1917 – October 29, 2007) was an American professional basketball player. He played for the Cleveland Allmen Transfers in the National Basketball League during the 1945–46 season and averaged 7.1 points per game. He also played in other semi-professional leagues.
