= Jim Satalin =

American college basketball coach

Biographical details
- Born: November 18, 1946 (age 79); Syracuse, New York, U.S.

Playing career
- 1965–1969: St. Bonaventure
- Position: Guard

Coaching career (HC unless noted)
- 1971–1973: St. Bonaventure (assistant)
- 1973–1982: St. Bonaventure
- 1982–1989: Duquesne

Head coaching record
- Overall: 240–213 (.530)
- Tournaments: 0–1 (NCAA Division I); 4–1 (NIT)

Accomplishments and honors

Championships
- NIT (1977)

Awards
- Atlantic 10 co-Coach of the Year (1983)

James Satalin (born November 18, 1943) is an American former college basketball coach and the current radio analyst for Syracuse men's basketball. Satalin spent 16 seasons as a head coach for St. Bonaventure and Duquesne.

A native of Syracuse, New York, Satalin played college basketball at St. Bonaventure from 1965 to 1969. At the close of his college career, he was drafted by the Milwaukee Bucks in the ninth round (115th pick overall) of the 1969 NBA draft. Satalin turned to coaching in 1971, returning to his Alma mater as freshman basketball coach and varsity assistant to Larry Weise. When Weise resigned to focus on his duties as athletic director, Satalin was tapped as the Bonnies' new head coach. Satalin coached the Bonnies for nine seasons, winning one National Invitation Tournament (NIT) title in 1977 and making one NCAA tournament appearance the following season. He then moved to Duquesne in 1982.

Satalin inherited the Dukes' job with low expectations but guided the team to a 12–16 record with a number of surprisingly competitive games. At the close of his first season, he was named the Atlantic 10 Conference co-Coach of the Year with his replacement at St. Bonaventure, Jim O'Brien. The honor was to be the high point of Satalin's Duquesne tenure. He had six losing seasons in his seven years at the school and had a variety of off-season controversies. Ultimately, he was fired on March 8, 1989, with an overall record of 85–120 at Duquesne.

Following his coaching career, Satalin stayed close to college basketball. He oversaw officials with both the Big East Conference and Atlantic 10 and was national director of Coaches vs. Cancer. In 2013, he began doing radio play-by-play for Syracuse men's basketball.

== Head coaching record ==
Record table
Season	Team	Overall	Conference	Standing	Postseason
St. Bonaventure Brown Indians (NCAA Division I Independent) (1973–1979)
1973–74	St. Bonaventure	17–9			
1974–75	St. Bonaventure	14–13			
1975–76	St. Bonaventure	17–10			
1976–77	St. Bonaventure	23–6			NIT Champion
1977–78	St. Bonaventure	21–8			NCAA Division I First Round
1978–79	St. Bonaventure	19–9			NIT First Round
St. Bonaventure Brown Indians (Eastern Athletic Association) (1979–1982)
1979–80	St. Bonaventure	16–11	5–5	T–4th	
1980–81	St. Bonaventure	14–13	6–7	6th	
1981–82	St. Bonaventure	14–14	7–7	T–4th	
St. Bonaventure:		155–93 (.625)	18–19 (.486)		
Duquesne Dukes (Atlantic 10 Conference) (1982–1989)
1982–83	Duquesne	12–16	6–8	4th (West)	
1983–84	Duquesne	10–18	8–10	T–6th	
1984–85	Duquesne	12–18	6–12	8th	
1985–86	Duquesne	15–14	9–9	5th	
1986–87	Duquesne	12–17	7–11	T–6th	
1987–88	Duquesne	11–21	6–12	8th	
1988–89	Duquesne	13–16	7–11	T–6th	
Duquesne:		85–120 (.415)	49–73 (.402)		
Total:		240–213 (.530)			
National champion Postseason invitational champion Conference regular season champion Conference regular season and conference tournament champion Division regular season champion Division regular season and conference tournament champion Conference tournament champion
