= Chick Davies (basketball) =

American basketball coach

Biographical details
- Born: March 1900; New Castle, Pennsylvania, U.S.
- Died: April 15, 1985 (aged 85); Pittsburgh, Pennsylvania, U.S.

Coaching career (HC unless noted)
- 1924–1948: Duquesne

Head coaching record
- Overall: 314–106
- Tournaments: 1–1 (NCAA); 2–3 (NIT)

Charles Robinson "Chick" Davies (March 1900 – April 15, 1985) was an American basketball coach. He served as the head men's basketball coach at Duquesne University from 1924 to 1948, compiling a record of 314–106. Davies' teams played in one NCAA tournament and three National Invitation Tournaments. He led Duquesne to the 1940 NCAA Final Four as well as the 1940 NIT championship game, where the Dukes lost to Colorado. Davies was born in March 1900 in New Castle, Pennsylvania. He died on April 15, 1985, in Pittsburgh, Pennsylvania.

== Head coaching record ==
Statistics overview
Season	Team	Overall	Conference	Standing	Postseason
Duquesne Dukes (Independent) (1924–1948)
1924–25	Duquesne	12–6			
1925–26	Duquesne	15–4			
1926–27	Duquesne	16–4			
1927–28	Duquesne	15–7			
1928–29	Duquesne	12–8			
1929–30	Duquesne	18–10			
1930–31	Duquesne	12–6			
1931–32	Duquesne	14–6			
1932–33	Duquesne	15–1			
1933–34	Duquesne	19–2			
1934–35	Duquesne	18–1			
1935–36	Duquesne	14–3			
1936–37	Duquesne	13–6			
1937–38	Duquesne	6–11			
1938–39	Duquesne	14–4			
1939–40	Duquesne	20–3			NCAA Final Four, NIT Runner–up
1940–41	Duquesne	17–3			NIT Quarterfinals
1941–42	Duquesne	15–6			
1942–43	Duquesne	12–7			
1946–47	Duquesne	20–2			NIT Quarterfinals
1947–48	Duquesne	17–6			
Duquesne:		314–106 (.748)			
Total:		314–106 (.748)			
National champion Postseason invitational champion Conference regular season champion Conference regular season and conference tournament champion Division regular season champion Division regular season and conference tournament champion Conference tournament champion

== See also ==
- List of NCAA Division I Men's Final Four appearances by coach
