= Ron Everhart =

American college basketball coach (born 1962)

Biographical details
- Born: January 11, 1962 (age 64); Fairmont, West Virginia, U.S.

Playing career
- 1981–1985: Virginia Tech

Coaching career (HC unless noted)
- 1985–1986: Georgia Tech (assistant)
- 1986–1988: VMI (assistant)
- 1988–1994: Tulane (assistant)
- 1994–2001: McNeese State
- 2001–2006: Northeastern
- 2006–2012: Duquesne
- 2012–2023: West Virginia (assistant)

Head coaching record
- Overall: 273–261
- Tournaments: 0–3 (NIT); 1–2 (CBI)

Accomplishments and honors

Championships
- Southland regular season (2001)

Awards
- Southland Coach of the Year (2001); America East Coach of the Year (2005)

Ronald Cochran Everhart (born January 11, 1962) is a former American college basketball coach who was most recently an assistant coach at West Virginia University. Born in Fairmont, West Virginia, he was previously head coach at Duquesne University, Northeastern University and McNeese State University.

== Career ==
Everhart took over as head coach of the Duquesne Dukes basketball team on March 29, 2006. Growing up less than 100 miles from the campus, Everhart watched Duquesne basketball frequently. In his first two seasons at Duquesne, he took a team that had won only three games the season prior to his arrival to 10 wins in 2006–07 and 17 in 2007–08. Everhart had previously turned around programs at both McNeese State and Northeastern.

In 2008–09, the Dukes made even more strides under Everhart, their signature performance coming in an upset win over #9 Xavier on February 7, 2009, Duquesne's biggest win in years. The sellout crowd stormed the court following the game. In his third season at Duquesne, he led the Dukes to the Atlantic 10 championship game. The Dukes lost the game 69–64, but earned an NIT bid, marking Duquesne's first postseason tournament since the 1994 NIT.

He was fired on March 22, 2012, following the completion of his sixth season as coach of the Dukes. On May 14, 2012, Everhart was named an assistant coach at his home-state West Virginia University under Hall of Fame coach and close friend Bob Huggins.

== Head coaching record ==
Record table
Season	Team	Overall	Conference	Standing	Postseason
McNeese State Cowboys (Southland Conference) (1994–2001)
1994–95	McNeese State	11–16	7–11	T–7th	
1995–96	McNeese State	15–12	11–7	T–4th	
1996–97	McNeese State	18–12	10–6	T–1st	
1997–98	McNeese State	7–19	4–12	9th	
1998–99	McNeese State	13–15	11–7	T–5th	
1999–00	McNeese State	6–21	5–13	T–9th	
2000–01	McNeese State	22–9	17–3	1st	NIT First Round
McNeese State:		92–104 (.469)	65–59 (.524)		
Northeastern Huskies (America East Conference) (2001–2005)
2001–02	Northeastern	7–21	5–11	T–7th	
2002–03	Northeastern	16–15	8–8	T–5th	
2003–04	Northeastern	19–11	13–5	3rd	
2004–05	Northeastern	21–10	15–3	2nd	NIT First Round
Northeastern Huskies (Colonial Athletic Association) (2005–2006)
2005–06	Northeastern	19–11	12–6	5th	
Northeastern:		82–68 (.547)	53–33 (.616)		
Duquesne Dukes (Atlantic 10 Conference) (2006–2012)
2006–07	Duquesne	10–19	6–10	T–10th	
2007–08	Duquesne	17–13	7–9	T–9th	
2008–09	Duquesne	21–13	9–7	T–5th	NIT First Round
2009–10	Duquesne	16–16	7–9	T–8th	CBI First Round
2010–11	Duquesne	19–13	10–6	T–4th	CBI Second Round
2011–12	Duquesne	16–15	7–9	T-9th	
Duquesne:		99–89 (.527)	46–50 (.479)		
Total:		273–261 (.511)			
National champion Postseason invitational champion Conference regular season champion Conference regular season and conference tournament champion Division regular season champion Division regular season and conference tournament champion Conference tournament champion
