= Eugene McGuigan =

American basketball player-coach

Father Eugene McGuigan, C.S.Sp.
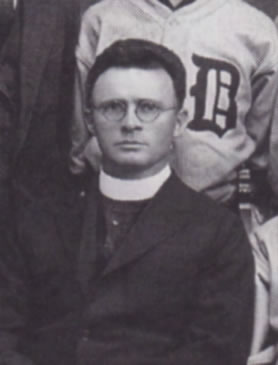
- McGuigan in the 1922 men's baseball team photo
- Occupation(s): Roman Catholic priest Athletic director

Eugene McGuigan, C.S.Sp. was the first athletic director of Duquesne University, serving in that capacity from 1920 until 1923. Known on campus as "Father Mac," McGuigan also coached baseball, football, and basketball.

== Men's basketball ==
McGuigan was the Duquesne Dukes men's basketball coach from 1914 to 1920 and again from 1921 and 1923. During his overall tenure as coach, the Dukes garnered 66 wins and 35 losses, a .653 win percentage. Aiming to avoid the association of the name of a Holy Ghost father with the perceived rowdiness of the game of basketball, Father McGuigan was dubbed "Coach Gene Martin" in newspaper reports.
