= Norm Nixon =

American basketball player (born 1955)

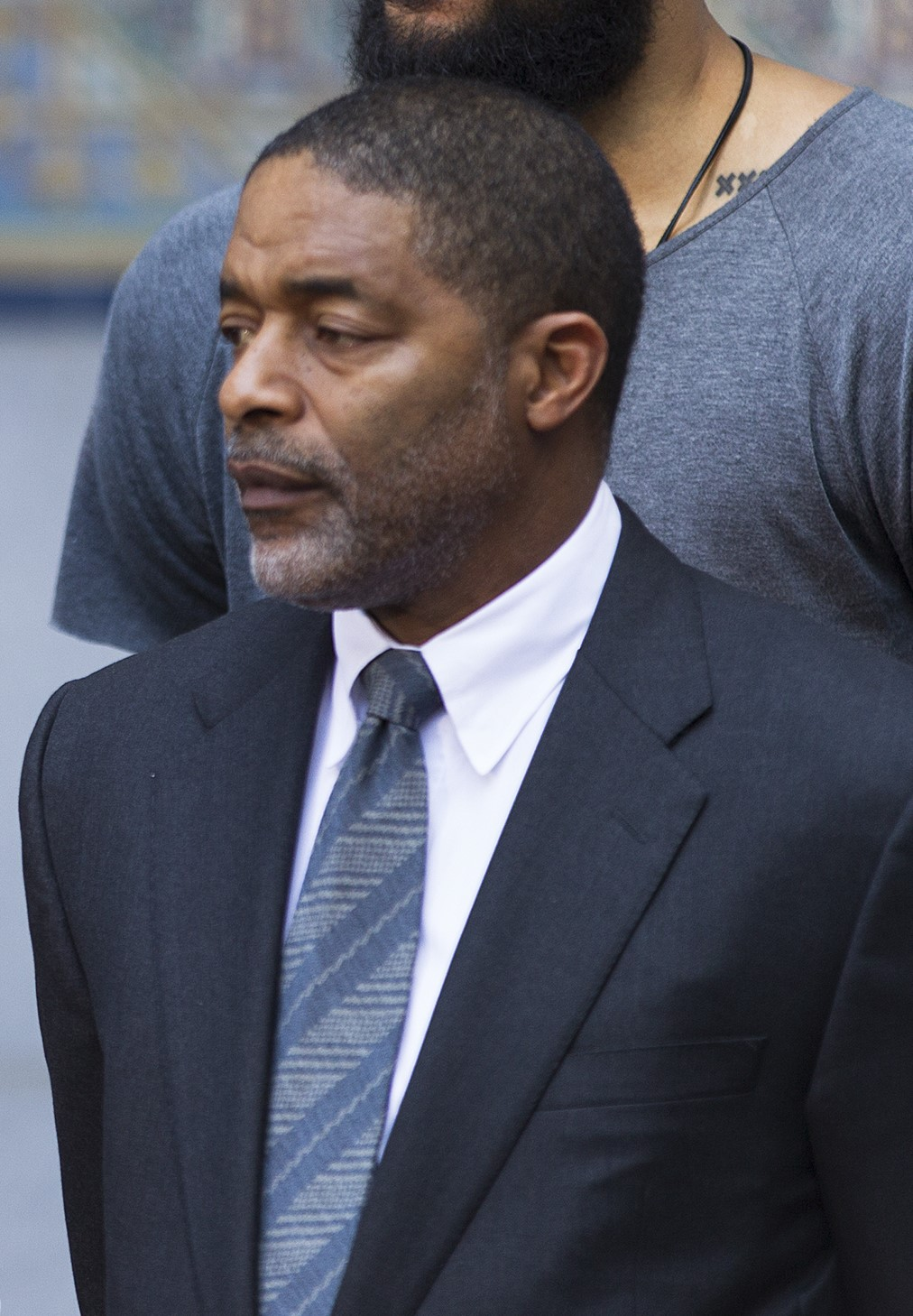
- Nixon in 2014

Personal information
- Born: October 11, 1955 (age 71) Macon, Georgia, U.S.
- Listed height: 6 ft 2 in (1.88 m)
- Listed weight: 170 lb (77 kg)

Career information
- High school: Southwest (Macon, Georgia)
- College: Duquesne (1973–1977)
- NBA draft: 1977: 1st round, 22nd overall pick
- Drafted by: Los Angeles Lakers
- Playing career: 1977–1989
- Position: Point guard
- Number: 10

Career history
- 1977–1983: Los Angeles Lakers
- 1983–1989: San Diego / Los Angeles Clippers
- 1989: Scavolini Pesaro

Career highlights
- 2× NBA champion (1980, 1982); 2× NBA All-Star (1982, 1985); NBA All-Rookie First Team (1978); Eastern 8 Player of the Year (1977); Eastern 8 tournament MVP (1977); No. 10 retired by Duquesne Dukes

Career NBA statistics
- Points: 12,065 (15.7 ppg)
- Assists: 6,386 (8.3 apg)
- Steals: 1,187 (1.5 spg)
- Stats at NBA.com
- Stats at Basketball Reference

Norman Ellard Nixon (born October 11, 1955) is an American former professional basketball player who played for the Los Angeles Lakers and the San Diego/Los Angeles Clippers of the National Basketball Association (NBA). He also played with Scavolini Pesaro in Italy. Nicknamed "Stormin' Norman", he is a two-time NBA All-Star. He won two NBA championships with the Lakers in 1980 and 1982, at the beginning of their Showtime era.

== Early life ==
Norm Nixon was born the third of three sons to Mary Jo and Elmer Nixon, in Macon, Georgia. His mother contracted myasthenia gravis when Norm was a baby, and his parents divorced when he was two years old. The three boys were raised with the help of their maternal grandmother and great-aunt. Norm and his two brothers, Ken and Ron, were raised in the Methodist church, where he became an usher.

A gifted athlete, Nixon played basketball and football in high school at Southwest High School in Macon. He was named to all-state in both sports. In football, he played defensive back and tailback. He was offered a free-agent tryout by both the Pittsburgh Steelers and Dallas Cowboys. He was senior class president and named as the starting guard on the Georgia All-State team for 1973. He had also led Southwest to the 1973 state high school basketball championship under coach Donald "Duck" Richardson. He was on the track team, where he ran the 440 yard dash, and won a regional title in the high jump at 6 feet, 5 inches. Nixon also played the trumpet and was on the yearbook staff.

== College ==
In college Nixon played four full seasons of basketball at Duquesne University in Pittsburgh, Pennsylvania. While there, he averaged 17.2 points, 5.5 assists, and 4.0 rebounds, scoring 1,805 points and adding 577 assists in 104 games for his career with the Duquesne Dukes. Nixon was named first-team All-Eastern Eight Conference, and left holding the record for career assists.

On January 27, 2001, during the halftime of a game against Xavier University, the Duquesne University Department of Athletics retired the jerseys of five of its all-time greatest players. These included Nixon's #10 (also retired were Chuck Cooper, Sihugo Green, Dick Ricketts, and Willie Somerset).

In 2019, Nixon approved his retired number 10 being worn by sophomore point guard Sincere Carry. The young Carry asked to wear it to honor a friend who wore number 10 in high school, and who had died that spring from gun violence.

== Professional career ==
=== Los Angeles Lakers ===
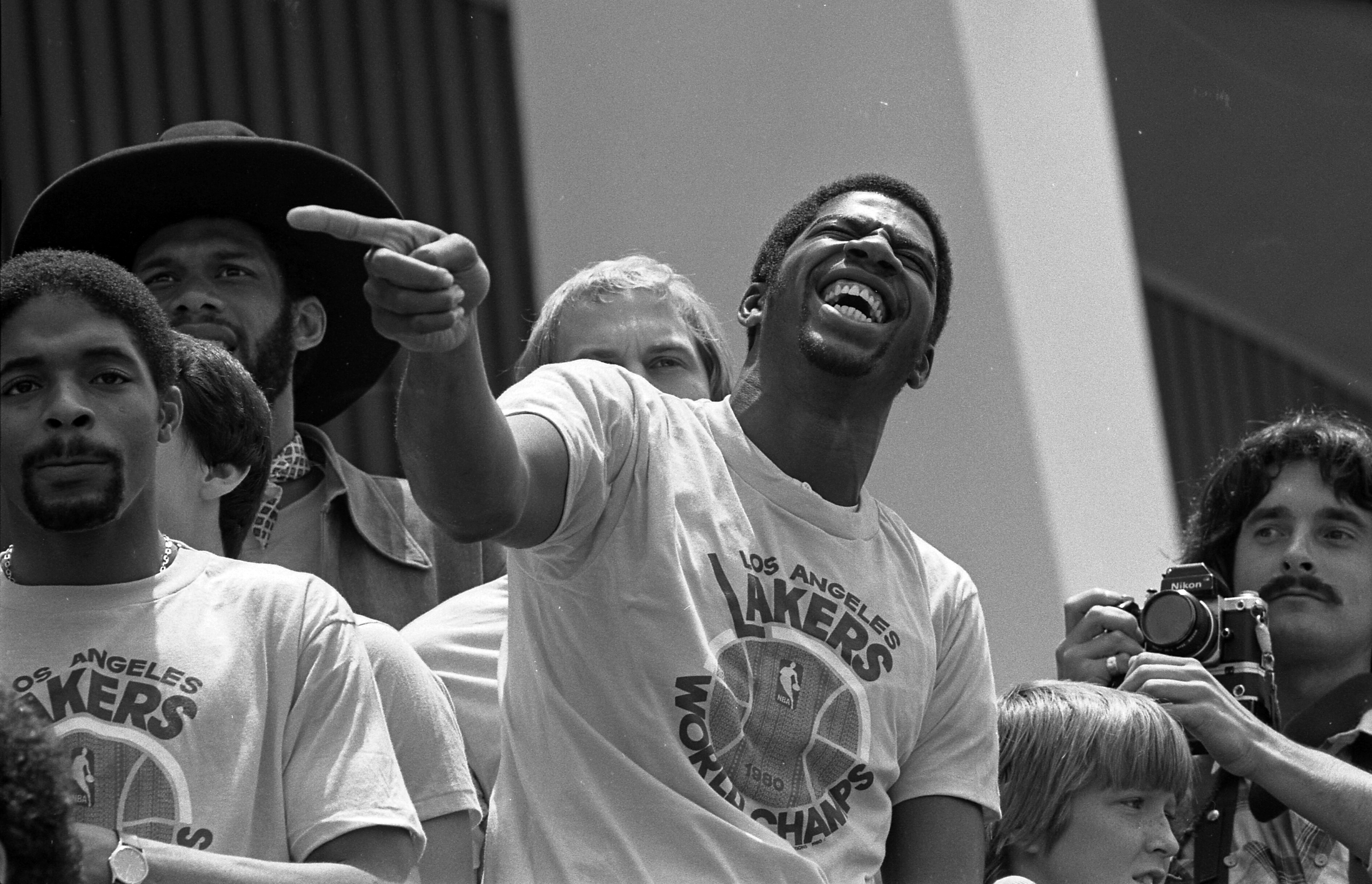
Nixon (left) stands next to Magic Johnson during the Los Angeles Lakers championship rally in 1980

Nixon was selected in the first round of the 1977 NBA draft by the Los Angeles Lakers with the 22nd overall pick. They had already picked another point guard, Brad Davis, earlier in that draft. Nixon played for the Lakers for six successful seasons. For the 1978–79 season, Nixon tied Eddie Jordan of the New Jersey Nets for the NBA lead in steals with 201. The next season (1979–80), he led the league in minutes played (3,226), minutes-per-game (39.3), and was third in assists with 642. In 1979–80, Lakers coach Jack McKinney had the 6-foot-9-inch (2.06 m) rookie Magic Johnson, who some analysts thought should play forward, be a point guard, even though Nixon was already one of the best in the league. In his four years sharing play-making responsibilities with Johnson, Nixon averaged at least seven assists each season.

In the 1978 (Seattle SuperSonics), 1979 (Seattle), and 1981 (Houston Rockets) playoffs, the Lakers were eliminated by the eventual Western Conference champion. But Nixon helped the Showtime Lakers win NBA championships in 1980 (4–2) and 1982 (4–2), both against the Philadelphia 76ers. Nixon led the team in scoring in the 1982 playoffs, averaging 20.4 points per game.

The Lakers lost in the 1983 NBA Finals, in which Philadelphia swept 4–0. In game one of the 1983 finals, Nixon had a violent collision with Andrew Toney of the 76ers early in the first quarter. He continued to play in games one and two despite a separated shoulder.

=== San Diego/Los Angeles Clippers ===
Prior to the start of the 1983–84 season, Nixon was traded to the San Diego Clippers in exchange for the draft rights to guard Byron Scott and backup center Swen Nater. Lakers general manager Jerry West made the deal to free Johnson from sharing the ball with Nixon. In his first year with the Clippers, Nixon led the league in total assists with 914, and regular season games played (82). He made the All-Star team for the second time in the 1984–85 season.

After the 1985–86 season, he spent much of his later career on the injured list, spending more than two full seasons on the injured list before retiring for good at the end of the 1988–89 season. During his time with the Clippers, the team never made the playoffs.

Nixon missed the 1986–87 season after stepping into a hole during a softball game in Central Park on July 23, 1986. He suffered severe damage to the tendon just above his left knee. Nixon ruptured his right Achilles tendon during a pre-season practice on November 4, 1987; the injury caused him to miss the entire 1987–88 season. Before his injuries, he played in 715 of 725 games available in his first nine seasons.

=== Scavolini Pesaro ===
After leaving the NBA in March 1989, Nixon played for Scavolini Pesaro of the Italian Serie A in April and May. In August 1989 Valerio Bianchini (who had coached Pesaro the previous season) head coach of Messaggero Roma tried to get Nixon to come play for the 1989–90 season.

=== Career accomplishments ===
During his NBA career, Nixon scored 12,065 points (15.7 points per game) and had 6,386 assists (8.3) in 768 games played. He was also remembered for faking a free throw at the end of a Lakers-San Antonio Spurs game on November 30, 1982, which caused a double lane violation. The referees erroneously ordered a jump ball, instead of requiring Nixon to re-shoot the free throw. The Lakers got the ball and Nixon made a field goal to tie the game, where they prevailed in overtime. The last three seconds of the game were later replayed in April 1983.

== Post-playing career ==
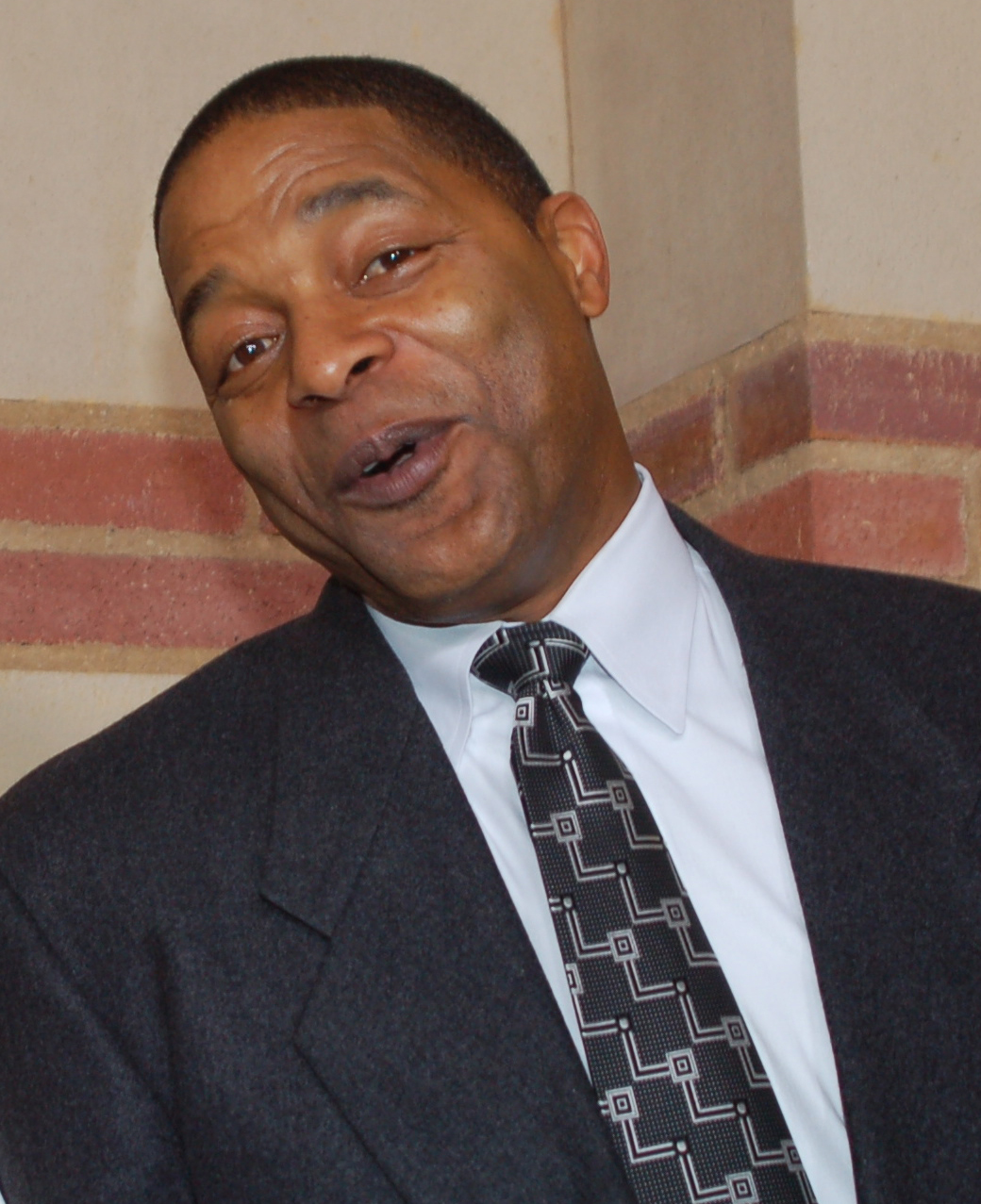
Nixon in 2010

Nixon participated in some of the NBA's Legends Classic games that took place during All-Star Weekend in the late 80s and early 90s, before a leg injury forced him out of a game. The league later ended these games due to fear of injuries among veteran players.

Nixon became a sports agent at Premier Management Group Inc. He later established his own firm, Norm Nixon & Associates, representing such clients as Doug Edwards, Samaki Walker, Jalen Rose, Maurice Taylor, Teddy Dupay, Gary Grant, Gerald Fitch, the NFL's Peter Warrick, Larry Smith, and Al Wilson, and entertainers such as LL Cool J and TLC.

With his wife, Nixon founded the Debbie Allen Dance Academy (DADA) in Culver City, California.

In his retirement years, Nixon concentrated on several business ventures. He served one season as radio commentator for the Clippers (2004–05), and was an analyst for KABC-TV's NBA post-game shows during the mid-2000s.

Subsequently, he was hired by Fox Sports West to take over Jack Haley's position as studio color analyst for all Lakers home games. He worked alongside studio host Bill McDonald during pregame, halftime, and postgame coverage.

== Personal life ==
Nixon has been married to actress/producer/director/dancer Debbie Allen since 1984. They have four children. Tristan Fuller-Nixon and DeVaughn Nixon, sons of Nixon from previous relationships, and two together: Vivian Nichole Nixon, who became a dancer and Norman Ellard Nixon Jr., who became a basketball player (he attended Wofford College and Southern University). Nixon's sister-in-law is Phylicia Rashad / actress/director/singer. His biological sister is Tracy Nixon-Moore. His biological brothers are Larry Nixon, Ronald Nixon, Kenneth Nixon, and David Jackson.

Before they were married, both Nixon and Allen appeared in the 1979 film The Fish That Saved Pittsburgh, which also featured NBA stars Julius Erving and Kareem Abdul-Jabbar.

Nixon's son DeVaughn portrayed him in the HBO drama series Winning Time: The Rise of the Lakers Dynasty.

== NBA career statistics ==
Legend
GP	Games played	GS	Games started	MPG	Minutes per game
FG%	Field goal percentage	3P%	3-point field goal percentage	FT%	Free throw percentage
RPG	Rebounds per game	APG	Assists per game	SPG	Steals per game
BPG	Blocks per game	PPG	Points per game	**Bold**	Career high
†	Won an NBA championship	*	Led the league

=== Regular season ===
Year	Team	GP	GS	MPG	FG%	3P%	FT%	RPG	APG	SPG	BPG	PPG
1977–78	L.A. Lakers	81	–	34.3	.497	–	.714	**3.0**	6.8	1.7	0.1	13.7
1978–79	L.A. Lakers	**82**	–	38.4	**.542**	–	.775	2.8	9.0	**2.5**	**0.2**	17.1
1979–80†	L.A. Lakers	**82**	–	**39.3***	.516	.125	.779	2.8	7.8	1.8	**0.2**	**17.6**
1980–81	L.A. Lakers	79	–	37.5	.476	.167	.778	2.9	8.8	1.8	0.1	17.1
1981–82†	L.A. Lakers	**82**	**82**	36.9	.493	.250	.808	2.1	8.0	1.6	0.1	**17.6**
1982–83	L.A. Lakers	79	79	34.3	.475	.000	.744	2.6	7.2	1.3	0.1	15.1
1983–84	San Diego	**82**	**82**	37.2	.462	.239	.760	2.5	**11.1**	1.1	0.0	17.0
1984–85	L.A. Clippers	81	81	35.7	.465	.333	.780	2.7	8.8	1.2	0.0	17.2
1985–86	L.A. Clippers	67	62	31.9	.438	**.347**	**.809**	2.7	8.6	1.3	0.0	14.6
1988–89	L.A. Clippers	53	30	24.9	.414	.276	.738	1.5	6.4	0.9	0.0	6.8
Career		768	416	35.5	.483	.294	.772	2.6	8.3	1.5	0.1	15.7
All-Star		2	0	19.0	.571	–	.500	1.0	5.0	1.0	0.0	12.5

=== Playoffs ===
Year	Team	GP	GS	MPG	FG%	3P%	FT%	RPG	APG	SPG	BPG	PPG
1978	L.A. Lakers	3	–	30.7	.458	–	.667	3.0	5.3	1.3	**0.3**	8.0
1979	L.A. Lakers	8	–	40.9	.471	–	.733	3.5	**11.8**	1.4	0.0	15.4
1980†	L.A. Lakers	**16**	–	40.5	.477	.200	**.804**	3.5	7.8	**2.0**	0.2	16.9
1981	L.A. Lakers	3	–	**44.3**	**.510**	–	.800	**3.7**	8.7	0.3	0.3	19.3
1982†	L.A. Lakers	14	–	39.2	.478	.333	.754	3.1	8.1	**1.6**	0.1	**20.4**
1983	L.A. Lakers	14	–	38.4	.477	**.429**	.740	3.4	6.4	1.3	0.1	19.0
Career		58	–	39.4	.478	.333	.763	3.4	8.0	1.5	0.1	17.7

== See also ==
- List of National Basketball Association career assists leaders
