= 1940 National Invitation Tournament =

Annual NCAA basketball competition

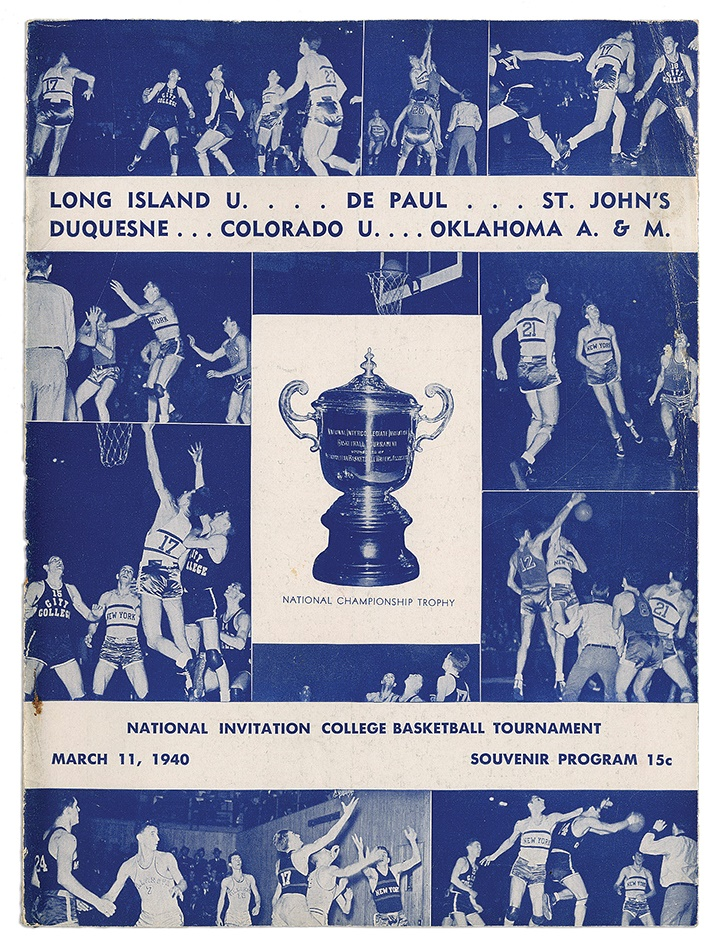

Tournament details
- City: New York City
- Venue: Madison Square Garden
- Teams: 6

Final positions
- Champions: Colorado Buffaloes (1st title)
- Runners-up: Duquesne Dukes
- Semifinalists: Oklahoma A&M Aggies; DePaul Blue Demons

Awards
- MVP: Bob Doll (Colorado)

The 1940 National Invitation Tournament was the 1940 edition of the annual NCAA college basketball competition.

== Selected teams ==
Below is a list of the six teams selected for the tournament.

Team	Conference
Colorado	Mountain States Conference
DePaul	Independent
Duquesne	Independent
Long Island	Independent
Oklahoma A&M	Missouri Valley Conference
St. John's Redmen	Metropolitan New York Conference

== Bracket ==
Below is the tournament bracket.

Quarterfinals
DePaul	45
Long Island	38
Duquesne	38
St. John's	31

Semifinals
Colorado	52
DePaul	37
Oklahoma A&M	30
Duquesne	34

Finals
Colorado	51
Duquesne	40
Third place
DePaul	22
Oklahoma A&M	23

== See also ==
- 1940 NCAA basketball tournament
- 1940 NAIA Division I men's basketball tournament
