= John Cinicola =

American basketball coach

Biographical details
- Born: August 14, 1929
- Died: August 14, 2014 (aged 85); Bellevue, Pennsylvania
- Education: Duquesne University

Coaching career (HC unless noted)
- 1960–1974: Duquesne (assistant)
- 1974–1978: Duquesne

Head coaching record
- Overall: 52–56

John L. Cinicola Jr. (August 14, 1929 – August 14, 2014) was an American high school and college basketball coach. He was head coach of his alma mater, Duquesne University, where he led the Dukes to the 1977 NCAA Tournament behind star guard Norm Nixon. His overall record at Duquesne was 52–56 in four seasons.

Cinicola died of cancer on August 14, 2014, in his home in Bellevue, Pennsylvania.
