= Duquesne Dukes men's basketball =

Men's college basketball team

Duquesne Dukes
2026–27 Duquesne Dukes men's basketball team
- University: Duquesne University
- Head coach: Dru Joyce III (3rd season)
- Location: Pittsburgh, Pennsylvania
- Arena: UPMC Cooper Fieldhouse (capacity: 3,500)
- Conference: Atlantic 10
- Nickname: Dukes
- Colors: Red and blue

NCAA Division I tournament Final Four
- 1940
Other NCAA Division I tournament results
Elite Eight	1940, 1952
Sweet Sixteen	1952, 1969
Appearances	1940, 1952, 1969, 1971, 1977, 2024

NIT champions
- 1955

Conference tournament champions
- 1977, 2024

Conference regular-season champions
- 1980, 1981

Uniforms
Home	Away	Alternate

The Duquesne Dukes represent Duquesne University in college basketball. The team, which started in 1914, has only ever played in NCAA Division I and has had six appearances in the NCAA Tournament. The Dukes play in the Atlantic 10 Conference, of which they have been members since 1976 (minus the 1992–93 season in which the Dukes were single-season members of the Midwestern Collegiate Conference). Their head basketball coach is Dru Joyce III.

The Dukes men's basketball team has had great success over the years, playing twice in national championship games in the 1950s and winning the National Invitation Tournament championship in 1955. Duquesne also emerged victorious in the 1976–77 Eastern Collegiate Basketball League (the forerunner to the Eastern Athletic Association, now known as the Atlantic 10 Conference) tournament and 2024 Atlantic 10 tournament. The Dukes were also 1979–80 and 1980–81 Eastern Athletic Association regular-season co-champions. The Associated Press ranked Duquesne as the No. 1 college basketball team in the country for two consecutive weeks during the 1953–54 season. They reached (and lost) the A10 tournament final in 1981 and 2009 before finally winning the conference tournament in 2024 and snapping the 47-year appearance drought in the NCAA tournament.

Duquesne is the only school to have back-to-back first overall picks in the National Basketball Association draft (Dick Ricketts by the Saint Louis Hawks in 1955 and Sihugo Green by the Rochester Royals in 1956). The Dukes men's basketball program can also claim the first African-American player selected in an NBA draft (Chuck Cooper by the Boston Celtics in 1950). The 1939–40 Dukes basketball team finished with a 20–3 record and appeared in the Final Four of both the NIT and NCAA Tournaments.

== History ==
=== Early history ===
The history of basketball at Duquesne University can be dated back to 1914, when the university administration established basketball as a varsity sport. The first game, against Bethany College, was won in a gym under the college chapel on January 9, 1914 (Rishel 23). The team was first coached by Alexander Hogarty, whose tenure lasted only one season. The position was filled by Father Eugene McGuigan, who was called "Father Mac" on campus and "Coach Gene Martin" in newspaper reports in order to prevent the name of a Holy Ghost father from being associated with the rowdiness of "Basket-ball". Father McGuigan coached football, baseball, and basketball until he was transferred from Duquesne University in 1923 (Rishel 38).

When a proper gymnasium was constructed in 1923, Duquesne Basketball was finally allowed to come into its own, as the previous court was in reality a stage below the chapel and was not only slanted but demarcated by a steel cage on its perimeter. Teams had previously refused to play the "Bluffites" on their home court. Coach "Chick" Davies initiated a new era in the basketball program, filling the 1,200-seat gymnasium and bringing the team into national prominence. In its first season with Davies, Duquesne tied with Waynesburg University for the Tri-State Conference championship and dominated the same conference in 1926 and 1927 before moving to a higher level of competition. The season expanded from 20 to 28 games and became more competitive in 1930 when the team faced the University of Iowa, Loyola University Chicago, Adrian College, Elmhurst College, Alfred State College, John Carroll University, American University, Catholic University, Colgate University, St. Bonaventure University, Seton Hall University, Manhattan College, and the City College of New York. Davies, immensely popular, coached Duquesne basketball until 1948 (Rishel 40–41).

=== World War II era ===
The university tried to hold on to basketball during World War II, having reworked the gymnasium in 1942 to seat an extra 800 spectators, but was forced to drop the sport at the end of the 1943 season (Rishel 81–82). However, the sport was reinstated in the spring of 1946. During the 1946–1947 season Davies led the Dukes to 19 straight victories before a loss to Georgetown University. In that same season, Duquesne received its third invitation to the NIT, losing by one point to the University of Utah, the eventual champion, which it had defeated during the regular season (Rishel 101).

During this first postwar season, the University of Tennessee refused to play a scheduled game against Duquesne at the McKeesport (PA) Vocational High School because the Dukes had a black player--Chuck Cooper. The December 23, 1946, game had been highly anticipated since Tennessee had two All-Americans and four other returning lettermen. As Davies refused to remove Cooper from the squad, Tennessee canceled at the last minute. In 1950, Cooper became the first African-American drafted to play professional basketball when he joined the Boston Celtics (Rishel 101).

=== Mid-century success ===
Dukes Basketball continued to impress with a new coach in the 1948–49 season--Donald "Dudey" Moore, who had also played for Duquesne. In the 1949–50 season, Moore's team achieved a 17–5 record in the 1948–49 season, and in 1950, 23 wins and another bid to the NIT. By the 1950s, Duquesne's Locust Street gym had become inadequate to seat the team's spectators, so games were usually played in a high school gym in McKeesport or the Duquesne Gardens in Oakland. Even at this point, daily practice was held at North Catholic High School (Rishel 102).

The 1950s marked an age of immense success for Dukes Basketball, with Moore leading his team to six NIT bids (1950, 1952, 1953, 1954, 1955, 1956). The team went 21–1 during the 1951–52 regular season and was the top seed in the tournament. Moore was named "Coach of the Year" by the New York Basketball Writers Association. In 1953, Duquesne was rated as a preseason "best in the East" and possibly the nation. With a 23–2 record, they were top seed for the NIT that year. Although they lost to the College of the Holy Cross, they achieved a new record of 26 victories in a season. Top-seeded again in '54, Duquesne, following a 19–4 regular season, finally won the title of NIT Champions in 1955 (Rishel 137–138).

The 1956 season almost came to an early end, as the Duquesne Gardens, then Duquesne's home court, was to be demolished. However, in a gesture which athletic director Doc Skender called "one of the finest acts of sportsmanship I've ever known," long-standing rival the University of Pittsburgh allowed the Dukes use of the Fitzgerald Field House for home games (Rishel 138).

Coach Red Manning, initially unpopular, soon led the Dukes to another era of postseason play, ending up in the Final Four in the 1962 NIT tournament, with further appearances in the NIT in 1964, 1968, and 1970, plus appearances in the NCAA Tournament in 1969 and 1971.

Notable in this decade was Willie Somerset, nicknamed by the press as "Wonderful Willie." Though only 5'11", he could jump higher than any other player on the team (Rishel 177).

=== 1970s to 1990s ===
Retired basketball jerseys
Number	Player	Year
15	Chuck Cooper	1947–1950
11	Sihugo Green	1954–1956
10	Norm Nixon	1974–1977
12	Dick Ricketts	1952–1955
24	Willie Somerset	1962–1965
13	Mike James	1995–1998

The 1970s saw the end of Manning's tenure. Duquesne had seen only four different basketball coaches in fifty years, but this decade alone saw three coaches: Red Manning, John Cinicola, and Mike Rice. The decade was relatively lackluster, although it saw the likes of "the greatest guard in Duquesne basketball history"--Norm Nixon (Rishel 216). The 1980s were marked by problems with many players' academic eligibility—calling into question the university's recruiting and support procedures—and are best described as "trying times" for the Dukes (Rishel 246). There were only two winning seasons in the decade--'80–81 and '85–86. Even so, the 1988 construction of the A. J. Palumbo Center—Duquesne Basketball's current home—is a notable event of this time period.

=== 21st century ===
The Dukes have had mixed success in the 21st century, reaching one NCAA Tournament (reaching the second round in 2024), one NIT Tournament (eliminated in the first round in 2009) and four College Basketball Invitational tournaments (twice making the second round). Despite coming off a second straight winning season and losing to Temple in the Atlantic 10 Conference Championship Game in 2009, coach Ron Everhart was fired after the 2011–2012 season; the university cited a lack of postseason success as the main reason for the firing. Jim Ferry was hired but failed to improve the team's performance and was fired in 2017 with an overall record of 60–97. Keith Dambrot was hired away from Akron and coached the team to a bid in the 2024 NCAA Tournament as an 11 seed after winning the Atlantic 10 Conference Tournament for the second time. They defeated the 6th-seeded BYU Cougars in the first round 71–67, their first NCAA tournament win in 55 years.

== Postseason ==
=== NCAA tournament results ===
The Dukes have appeared in the NCAA Tournament six times. Their combined record is 5–6.

Year	Seed	Round	Opponent	Result
1940		Elite Eight; Final Four	Western Kentucky; Indiana	W 30–29; L 30–39
1952		Sweet Sixteen; Elite Eight	Princeton; Illinois	W 60–49; L 68–74
1969		First Round; Sweet Sixteen; Regional 3rd Place Game	Saint Joseph's; North Carolina; St. John's	W 74–52; L 78–79; W 75–72
1971		First Round	Penn	L 65–70
1977		First Round	VMI	L 66–73
2024	11	First Round; Second Round	(6) BYU (3) Illinois	W 71–67; L 63–89

=== NIT results ===
The Dukes have appeared in the National Invitation Tournament (NIT) 17 times. Their combined record is 17–19. They were NIT champions in 1955.

Year	Round	Opponent	Result
1940	Quarterfinals; Semifinals; Final	St. John's; Oklahoma A&M; Colorado	W 38–31; W 34–30; L 40–51
1941	Quarterfinals	Ohio	L 40–55
1947	Quarterfinals	Utah	L 44–45
1950	Quarterfinals; Semifinals; 3rd Place Game	La Salle; CCNY; St. John's	W 49–47; L 52–62; L 67–69
1952	Quarterfinals; Semifinals; 3rd Place Game	Holy Cross; La Salle; St. Bonaventure	W 78–68; L 46–59; L 34–48
1953	First Round; Quarterfinals; Semifinals; 3rd Place Game	Tulsa; Western Kentucky; St. John's; Manhattan	W 88–69; W 69–61; L 55–64; W 81–67
1954	Quarterfinals; Semifinals; Final	Saint Francis (PA); Niagara; Holy Cross	W 69–63; W 66–51; L 62–71
1955	Quarterfinals; Semifinals; Final	Louisville; Cincinnati; Dayton	W 74–66; W 65–61; W 70–58
1956	First Round; Quarterfinals	Oklahoma A&M; Louisville	W 69–61; L 72–84
1962	First Round; Quarterfinals; Semifinals; 3rd Place Game	Navy; Bradley; St. John's; Loyola–Chicago	W 70–58; W 88–85; L 65–75; L 84–95
1964	Quarterfinals	Army	L 65–67
1968	First Round	Fordham	L 60–69
1970	First Round	Georgia Tech	L 68–78
1980	First Round; Second Round	Pittsburgh; Saint Peter's	W 65–63; L 33–34
1981	First Round	Michigan	L 58–74
1994	First Round; Second Round	Charlotte; Villanova	W 75–73; L 66–82
2009	First Round	Virginia Tech	L 108–116^{2OT}

=== CBI results ===
The Dukes have appeared in the College Basketball Invitational (CBI) four times. Their combined record is 2–4.

Year	Round	Opponent	Result
2010	First Round	Princeton	L 51–55
2011	First Round; Quarterfinals	Montana; Oregon	W 87–74; L 75–77
2016	First Round; Quarterfinals	Omaha; Morehead State	W 120–112; L 72–82
2023	First Round	Rice	L 78–84

=== National Campus Basketball Tournament results ===
The Dukes appeared in the only National Campus Basketball Tournament. Their record is 0–1.

Year	Round	Opponent	Result
1951	Quarterfinals	Wyoming	L 63–78

== Retired numbers ==
On January 27, 2001, during the halftime of a game against Xavier University, the Duquesne University Department of Athletics retired the jersey numbers of five of its all-time greatest players: Chuck Cooper, Sihugo Green, Norm Nixon, Dick Ricketts and Willie Somerset. Mike James' number 13 was retired in 2017.

Duquesne Dukes retired numbers
No.	Player	Pos.	Career	No. ret.	Ref.
10	Norm Nixon	PG	1973–1977	2001	
11	Sihugo Green	PG / SG	1953–1956	2001	
12	Dick Ricketts	PF / C	1951–1955	2001	
13	Mike James	PG	1994–1998	2017	
15	Chuck Cooper	SF / SG	1946–1950	2001	
24	Willie Somerset	PG	1961–1965	2001	

== Notable players ==
All-Americans

- 1935 – Paul Birch
- 1936 – Herb Bonn, Walter Miller
- 1940 – Ed Milkovich, Paul Widowitz
- 1941 – Moe Becker, Paul Widowitz
- 1950 – Chuck Cooper
- 1952 – Jim Tucker
- 1953 – Dick Ricketts
- 1954 – Sihugo Green, Dick Ricketts
- 1955 – Sihugo Green, Dick Ricketts
- 1956 – Sihugo Green
- 1965 – Willie Somerset
- 1973 – Norm Nixon

Professional

- Derrick Alston (born 1972), American basketball player
- Mike James (born 1975), American basketball player
- Aaron Jackson (born 1986), American basketball player
- Shawn James (born 1983), Guyanese-American basketball player
- T. J. McConnell (born 1992), American basketball player
- Tavian Dunn-Martin, (born 1998), American basketball player
