= 2009–10 Colonial Athletic Association men's basketball season =

- League: NCAA Division I
- Sport: Basketball
- Teams: 12

Regular Season
- Champions: Old Dominion

Tournament
- Champions: Old Dominion

CAA men's basketball seasons
- ← 2008–09 2010–11 →

2009–10 CAA men's basketball standings
	Conf.				Overall
Team	W		L	PCT	W		L	PCT
Old Dominion †	15	–	3	.833	27	–	9	.750
Northeastern	14	–	4	.778	20	–	13	.606
William & Mary	12	–	6	.667	22	–	11	.667
George Mason	12	–	6	.667	17	–	15	.531
VCU	11	–	7	.611	27	–	9	.750
Drexel	11	–	7	.611	16	–	16	.500
Hofstra	10	–	8	.556	19	–	15	.559
Towson	6	–	12	.333	10	–	21	.323
Georgia State	5	–	13	.278	12	–	20	.375
UNCW	5	–	13	.278	9	–	22	.290
James Madison	4	–	14	.222	13	–	20	.394
Delaware	3	–	15	.167	7	–	24	.226
† 2010 CAA tournament winner Rankings from AP poll

The 2009–10 CAA men's basketball season marks the 25th season of Colonial Athletic Association basketball. The conference had numerous "Silver Anniversary" programs and highlights throughout the season.

== Preseason ==
On September 23, 2009 the Colonial Athletic Association announced that all 12 CAA teams had been named to ESPN's BracketBusters, which is set for February 19–20, 2010. Home games will be played by Delaware, George Mason, Georgia State, Hofstra, Northeastern and Virginia Commonwealth (VCU). Drexel, James Madison, UNC Wilmington, Old Dominion, Towson and William & Mary are all road teams.

=== CAA Media Day ===
On October 20, 2009 the Colonial Athletic Association held their annual Media Day at the ESPN Zone in Washington, D.C. The results of a vote of the league's coaches, sports information directors and media was announced to unveil the predicted order of finish for the CAA teams in the conference as well as the preseason all-conference teams.

=== 2009–10 Preseason All-CAA Team ===
First Team	Class	Position	Height	Hometown / Previous School(s)
Matt Janning, Northeastern	Sr.	G/F	6'4"	Watertown, MN / Watertown-Mayer
Charles Jenkins, Hofstra	Jr.	G	6'3"	Queens, N.Y. / Springfield Gardens
Gerald Lee, Old Dominion	Sr.	C/F	6'10"	Uusikaupunki, Finland / Korhait
Cam Long, George Mason	Jr.	G	6'4"	Palm Bay, FL / Freedom (VA)
Larry Sanders, VCU	Jr.	F	6'11"	Fort Pierce, FL / Port St. Lucie

Second Team	Class	Position	Height	Hometown / Previous School(s)
Manny Adako, Northeastern	Sr.	F	6'8"	Decatur, GA / Towers / Winchendon Prep
Joe Dukes, Georgia State	Sr.	G	6'1"	Cuthbert, GA / Randolph Clay / Wake Forest
David Schneider, William & Mary	Sr.	G	6'3"	Phoenix, AZ / Brophy Prep
Chad Tomko, UNC Wilmington	Jr.	G	5'11"	Charlotte, NC / Independence
Julius Wells, James Madison	So.	F	6'5"	Toledo, OH / Libbey

CAA Preseason Co-Players of the Year
Charles Jenkins (Hofstra) and Gerald Lee (Old Dominion)
Honorable Mention
Ben Finney, Jr., G/F, Old Dominion; Jawan Carter, Jr., G, Delaware; Chaisson Allen, Jr., G, Northeastern

=== CAA Preseason Poll ===
1. Old Dominion
2. Northeastern
3. VCU
4. George Mason
5. James Madison
6. Hofstra

7. Drexel
8. Georgia State
9. Towson
10. William and Mary
11. Delaware
12. UNC Wilmington

== Notable upsets ==
Date	Winner	Opponent	Score	Notes
19 November 2009	UNCW	Penn State	80–69	Penn State came into the 2009–10 season as the defending NIT champion.
21 November 2009	VCU	#17 Oklahoma	82–69	Marked former VCU head coach Jeff Capel's return to Richmond; was the first ranked team to play in the Siegel Center, which opened in 1999.
28 November 2009	William & Mary	Wake Forest	78–68	
12 December 2009	George Mason	Creighton	75–72	
19 December 2009	Old Dominion	#11 Georgetown	61–57	
30 December 2009	William & Mary	Maryland	83–77	William & Mary completed their season sweep of Atlantic Coast Conference opponents (2–0), marking the first time in school history that they have defeated two ACC foes on the road in the same season; the win was the Tribe's 9th in a row, good for the second longest winning streak in program history.
