= 2009–10 Old Dominion Monarchs basketball team =

American college basketball season

2009–10 Old Dominion Monarchs basketball

CAA regular season & tournament champions

NCAA tournament, Round of 32
- Conference: Colonial Athletic Association
- Record: 27–9 (15–3 CAA)
- Head coach: Blaine Taylor
- Assistant coaches: Jim Corrigan; John Richardson; Robert Wilkes
- Home arena: Ted Constant Convocation Center

2009–10 CAA men's basketball standings
	Conf.				Overall
Team	W		L	PCT	W		L	PCT
Old Dominion †	15	–	3	.833	27	–	9	.750
Northeastern	14	–	4	.778	20	–	13	.606
William & Mary	12	–	6	.667	22	–	11	.667
George Mason	12	–	6	.667	17	–	15	.531
VCU	11	–	7	.611	27	–	9	.750
Drexel	11	–	7	.611	16	–	16	.500
Hofstra	10	–	8	.556	19	–	15	.559
Towson	6	–	12	.333	10	–	21	.323
Georgia State	5	–	13	.278	12	–	20	.375
UNCW	5	–	13	.278	9	–	22	.290
James Madison	4	–	14	.222	13	–	20	.394
Delaware	3	–	15	.167	7	–	24	.226
† 2010 CAA tournament winner Rankings from AP poll

The 2009–10 Old Dominion Monarchs basketball team represented Old Dominion University in the 2009–10 college basketball season. This was head coach Blaine Taylor's ninth season at Old Dominion. The Monarchs compete in the Colonial Athletic Association and played their home games at the Ted Constant Convocation Center. They finished the season 27–9, 15–3 in CAA play to win the regulars season championship. They also won the 2010 CAA men's basketball tournament to earn the CAA's automatic bid to the 2010 NCAA Division I men's basketball tournament. They earned an 11 seed in the South Region where they upset 6 seed Notre Dame in the first round before losing to 3 seed and AP #19 Baylor in the second round.

== Preseason ==
In the CAA preseason polls, released October 20 in Washington, D.C., Old Dominion was predicted to finish first in the CAA. Sr. C/F Gerald Lee was selected to the preseason all conference first team and was picked as the conference preseason co–player of the year with Hofstra's Charles Jenkins. Jr. G/F Ben Finney was a preseason conference honorable mention.

== Roster ==
Monarch Men's Basketball; 2009–2010 roster
G/F	24	Kent Bazemore	Sophomore (RS)	6'5", 190 lb	(Kelford, North Carolina)
F	33	Keyon Carter	Junior (RS)	6'8", 218 lb	(Riveiera Beach, Florida)
F	20	Chris Cooper	Sophomore	6'9", 215 lb	(Woodridge, Virginia)
G	22	Marquel De Lancey	Sophomore	6'0", 190 lb	(Alexandria, Virginia)
G/F	35	Ben Finney	Junior	6'5", 220 lb	(Portsmouth, Virginia)
F	21	Frank Hassell	Junior (RS)	6'8", 245 lb	(Chesapeake, Virginia)
G	2	Josh Hicks	Freshman	5'9, 160 lb	(Virginia Beach, Virginia)
G	15	Trian Iliadis	Sophomore	6'3", 185 lb	(Perth, W. Australia)
G	3	Darius James	Junior	6'1", 165 lb	(Virginia Beach, Virginia)
C/F	40	Anton Larsen	Freshman	7'0, 240 lb	(Copenhagen, Denmark)
F	12	Gerald Lee	Senior	6'10", 250 lb	(Uusikaupunki, Finland)
G	23	Marsharee Neely	Senior	6'2", 190 lb	(Greensboro, North Carolina)
F	1	Nick Wright	Freshman (RS)	6'8", 205 lb	(Suffolk, Virginia)

== Coaching staff ==
- Blaine Taylor – Head Coach
- Jim Corrigan – Assistant Coach
- John Richardson – Assistant Coach
- Robert Wilkes – Assistant Coach
- Joel Hines – Director of Basketball Operations

== Schedule and results ==
- All times are Eastern

Date time, TV	Rank^{#}	Opponent^{#}	Result	Record	Site (attendance) city, state
Exhibition
11/2/2009*; 7:00pm		Barton	W 91–62		Ted Constant Convocation Center (5,696); Norfolk, Virginia
11/7/2009*; 7:00pm		Elizabeth City State	W 91–62		Ted Constant Convocation Center (6,972); Norfolk, Virginia
Regular Season
11/15/2009*; 1:00pm		Bethune–Cookman; South Padre Island Invitational	W 69–38	1–0	Ted Constant Convocation Center (6,015); Norfolk, Virginia
11/17/2009*; 7:00pm		Longwood; South Padre Island Invitational	W 98–59	2–0	Ted Constant Convocation Center (6,264); Norfolk, Virginia
11/19/2009*; 7:00pm		at Liberty	W 73–41	3–0	Vines Center (2,013); Lynchburg, Virginia
11/21/2009*; 7:00pm		Marshall	W 70–62	4–0	Ted Constant Convocation Center (7,141); Norfolk, Virginia
11/27/2009*; 8:30pm, FCS		vs. Missouri; South Padre Island Invitational	L 61–66	4–1	South Padre Island Convention Centre (NA); South Padre Island, Texas
11/28/2009*; 5:30pm, FCS		vs. Mississippi State; South Padre Island Invitational	L 55–69	4–2	South Padre Island Convention Centre (NA); South Padre Island, Texas
12/2/2009*; 7:00pm		at Richmond	L 60–67	4–3	Robins Center (4,130); Richmond, Virginia
12/5/2009; 7:00pm		Delaware	W 65–44	5–3 (1–0)	Ted Constant Convocation Center (6,318); Norfolk, Virginia
12/8/2009*; 7:00pm		Mount St. Mary's	W 64–38	6–3	Ted Constant Convocation Center (5,803); Norfolk, Virginia
12/11/2009*; 7:00pm, Cox Channel 11; Comcast Plus		at Dayton	L 50–58	6–4	UD Arena (13,159); Dayton, Ohio
12/19/2009*; 7:00pm, MASN		at No. 11 Georgetown	W 61–57	7–4	McDonough Gymnasium (2,400); Washington, D.C.
12/23/2009*; 7:00pm		Charlotte	W 81–48	8–4	Ted Constant Convocation Center (6,513); Norfolk, Virginia
12/30/2009*; 7:00pm		Duquesne	W 63–54	9–4	Ted Constant Convocation Center (6,612); Norfolk, Virginia
1/2/2010; 12:00pm, CSN-Washington		at George Mason	L 55–71	9–5 (1–1)	Patriot Center (8,629); Fairfax, Virginia
1/4/2010; 7:00pm		at Towson	W 87–71	10–5 (2–1)	Towson Center (1,077); Towson, Maryland
1/6/2010; 7:00pm		James Madison; Rivalry	W 74–72	11–5 (3–1)	Ted Constant Convocation Center (7,078); Norfolk, Virginia
1/9/2010; 4:00pm, CSN-Washington		Hofstra	W 57–46	12–5 (4–1)	Ted Constant Convocation Center (6,834); Norfolk, Virginia
1/13/2010; 7:00pm, WSKY		at UNC Wilmington	W 70–52	13–5 (5–1)	Trask Coliseum (2,820); Wilmington, North Carolina
1/16/2010; 7:00pm		Drexel	W 71–48	14–5 (6–1)	Ted Constant Convocation Center (2,820); Norfolk, Virginia
1/20/2010; 7:00pm, WSKY		at Delaware	W 68–49	15–5 (7–1)	Bob Carpenter Center (2,178); Newark, Delaware
1/23/2010; 7:00pm, WSKY		at William & Mary; Rivalry	W 58–55	16–5 (8–1)	Kaplan Arena (7,216); Williamsburg, Virginia
1/28/2010; 7:00pm, MASN		Georgia State	W 56–40	17–5 (9–1)	Ted Constant Convocation Center (7,029); Norfolk, Virginia
1/30/2010; 4:00pm, CSN-Washington		at Northeastern	L 64–74	17–6 (9–2)	Matthews Arena (3,061); Boston, Massachusetts
2/3/2010; 6:00pm		William & Mary; Rivalry	W 61–42	18–6 (10–2)	Ted Constant Convocation Center (8,015); Norfolk, Virginia
2/6/2010; 4:00pm, CSN-Washington		at VCU; Rivalry	L 58–70	18–7 (10–3)	Stuart C. Siegel Center (7,556); Richmond, Virginia
2/10/2010; 7:00pm, WSKY		at James Madison; Rivalry	W 64–44	19–7 (11–3)	Convocation Center (3,434); Harrisonburg, Virginia
2/13/2010; 4:00pm, CSN-Washington		George Mason	W 76–60	20–7 (12–3)	Ted Constant Convocation Center (8,424); Norfolk, Virginia
2/16/2010; 7:00pm, CSN-Washington		Towson	W 78–67	21–7 (13–3)	Ted Constant Convocation Center (6,832); Norfolk, Virginia
2/19/2010*; 7:00pm, ESPN2		at Northern Iowa; ESPN BracketBusters	L 62–71	21–8	McLeod Center (7,031); Cedar Falls, Iowa
2/23/2010; 7:00pm, CSN-Washington		at Georgia State	W 75–62	22–8 (14–3)	GSU Sports Arena (1,142); Atlanta
2/27/2010; 7:00pm, CSN-Washington		VCU; Rivalry	W 73–70	23–8 (15–3)	Ted Constant Convocation Center (8,424); Norfolk, Virginia
2010 CAA men's basketball tournament
3/6/2010; 12:00pm, CSN-NE		vs. Towson; Quarterfinals	W 86–56	24–8	Richmond Coliseum (NA); Richmond, Virginia
3/7/2010; 3:00pm, CSN-NE		vs. VCU; Semifinals	W 73–69 ^{OT}	25–8	Richmond Coliseum (NA); Richmond, Virginia
3/8/2010; 7:00pm, ESPN		vs. William & Mary; Finals	W 60–53	26–8	Richmond Coliseum (8,455); Richmond, Virginia
2010 NCAA Division I men's basketball tournament
3/18/2010; 12:25pm, CBS		vs. Notre Dame; First Round	W 51–50	27–8	New Orleans Arena (10,484); New Orleans
3/20/2010; 5:45pm, CBS		vs. No. 19 Baylor; Second Round	L 68–76	27–9	New Orleans Arena (11,966); New Orleans
*Non-conference game. ^{#}Rankings from AP Poll. (#) Tournament seedings in parentheses.
