= 2010 CAA men's basketball tournament =

- Classification: Division I
- Season: 2009–10
- Teams: 12
- Site: Richmond Coliseum; Richmond, Virginia, United States
- Champions: Old Dominion (7th title)
- Winning coach: Blaine Taylor (2nd title)
- MVP: Gerald Lee (Old Dominion)
- Television: Comcast SportsNet; ESPN

2009–10 CAA men's basketball standings
	Conf.				Overall
Team	W		L	PCT	W		L	PCT
Old Dominion †	15	–	3	.833	27	–	9	.750
Northeastern	14	–	4	.778	20	–	13	.606
William & Mary	12	–	6	.667	22	–	11	.667
George Mason	12	–	6	.667	17	–	15	.531
VCU	11	–	7	.611	27	–	9	.750
Drexel	11	–	7	.611	16	–	16	.500
Hofstra	10	–	8	.556	19	–	15	.559
Towson	6	–	12	.333	10	–	21	.323
Georgia State	5	–	13	.278	12	–	20	.375
UNCW	5	–	13	.278	9	–	22	.290
James Madison	4	–	14	.222	13	–	20	.394
Delaware	3	–	15	.167	7	–	24	.226
† 2010 CAA tournament winner Rankings from AP poll

The 2010 CAA men's basketball tournament was held from March 5–8, 2010 at the Richmond Coliseum in Richmond, Virginia. The winner of the tournament was Old Dominion, who received an automatic bid to the 2010 NCAA Men's Division I Basketball Tournament. Old Dominion was unbeaten on home court this season, winning 15 of their 23 games at the Ted Constant Convocation Center. The final matchup between William & Mary and Old Dominion was their 53rd match-up in school history.

== Television ==
The first round was not televised but was streamed live on CAASports.com. Quarterfinals and semifinals games were broadcast on various Comcast SportsNet networks. The championship game was broadcast on ESPN.

== Tournament bracket ==
First round Friday, March 5, 2010
8	Towson	91
9	UNC Wilmington	74
5	VCU	66
12	Delaware	49
7	Hofstra	68
10	Georgia State	67
6	Drexel	65
11	James Madison	77

Quarterfinals; Saturday, March 6, 2010
1	Old Dominion	86
8	Towson	56
4	George Mason	60
5	VCU	75
2	Northeastern	74**
7	Hofstra	71
3	William & Mary	70
11	James Madison	65

Semifinals; Sunday, March 7, 2010
1	Old Dominion	73*
5	VCU	69
2	Northeastern	45
3	William & Mary	47

Championship Game; Monday, March 8, 2010
1	Old Dominion	60
3	William & Mary	53

== Honors ==
CAA All-Tournament Team	Player	School	Position	Year
CAA All-Tournament Team	Matt Janning	Northeastern	Guard/Forward	Senior
CAA All-Tournament Team	Joey Rodriguez	VCU	Guard	Sophomore
CAA All-Tournament Team	Gerald Lee	Old Dominion	Forward	Senior
CAA All-Tournament Team	Kent Bazemore	Old Dominion	Guard/Forward	Sophomore
CAA All-Tournament Team	David Schneider	William & Mary	Guard	Senior
CAA All-Tournament Team	Danny Sumner	William & Mary	Forward	Senior

== See also ==
- Colonial Athletic Association
- 2009–10 Colonial Athletic Association men's basketball season
