= 2014–15 Anadolu Efes S.K. season =

Anadolu Efes S.K.
2014–15 season
- Chairman: Tuncay Özilhan
- Head coach: Dušan Ivković
- Arena: Abdi İpekçi Arena
- Euroleague: Quarterfinalist
- TBL: 2nd Playoffs: Runners-up
- Turkish Cup: Champions
Home	Away

The 2014–15 season of Anadolu Efes S.K. is the 36th season of the club in the highest division of Turkish basketball. It was the first full season Dušan Ivković was the head coach of the team.

== Roster ==
Note: Flags indicate national team eligibility at FIBA-sanctioned events. Players may hold other non-FIBA nationalities not displayed.

Anadolu Efes roster
Players
Coaches

Pos.	No.	Nat.	Name	Ht.	Wt.	Age
PG	4	(Turkey)	Balbay, Doğuş	1.85 m (6 ft 1 in)	85 kg (187 lb)	26 – 21 January 1989
SG	5	(Ireland)	McGrath, Donnie	1.93 m (6 ft 4 in)	88 kg (194 lb)	31 – 7 May 1984
SG	6	(Turkey)	Osman, Cedi	2.06 m (6 ft 9 in)	88 kg (194 lb)	19 – 4 August 1995
SF	7	(Greece)	Perperoglou, Stratos	2.03 m (6 ft 8 in)	104 kg (229 lb)	30 – 7 August 1984
SG	8	(Turkey)	Batuk, Birkan	1.96 m (6 ft 5 in)	87 kg (192 lb)	25 – 30 January 1990
PF	9	(Croatia)	Šarić, Dario	2.08 m (6 ft 10 in)	104 kg (229 lb)	21 – 8 April 1994
PG	10	(Croatia)	Draper, Dontaye	1.80 m (5 ft 11 in)	82 kg (181 lb)	30 – 10 August 1984
C	12	(Serbia)	Krstić, Nenad	2.13 m (7 ft 0 in)	121 kg (267 lb)	31 – 25 July 1983
PF	13	(Gabon)	Lasme, Stephane	2.03 m (6 ft 8 in)	98 kg (216 lb)	32 – 17 December 1982
SF	17	(Turkey)	Akyol, Cenk	2.00 m (6 ft 7 in)	94 kg (207 lb)	28 – 16 April 1987
SG	18	(Turkey)	Coşar, Efekan	1.92 m (6 ft 4 in)		21 – 7 February 1994
SF	21	(Turkey)	Ulubay, Okben	2.01 m (6 ft 7 in)	86 kg (190 lb)	19 – 25 May 1996
SG	22	(Turkey)	Korkmaz, Furkan	1.98 m (6 ft 6 in)	77 kg (170 lb)	17 – 24 July 1997
SG	23	(United States)	Janning, Matt	1.97 m (6 ft 6 in)	88 kg (194 lb)	26 – 22 June 1988
PF	32	(Turkey)	Kılıçlı, Deniz	2.06 m (6 ft 9 in)	129 kg (284 lb)	24 – 23 October 1990
C	41	(Turkey)	Koşut, Emircan	2.16 m (7 ft 1 in)	98 kg (216 lb)	19 – 3 July 1995
PF	51	(Montenegro)	Bjelica, Milko	2.07 m (6 ft 9 in)	102 kg (225 lb)	31 – 4 June 1984
PG	22	(France)	Heurtel, Thomas	1.89 m (6 ft 2 in)	90.5 kg (200 lb)	26 – 10 April 1989

Head coach

- (Serbia) Dušan Ivković

Assistant coach(es)

- (Greece) Vangelis Angelou
- (Turkey) Ahmet Çakı
- (Croatia) Tomislav Mijatović
- (Serbia) Djordje Adzic

Team manager

- (Turkey) Engin Özerhun

Legend

- (C) Team captain
- Injured

- Roster
Updated: December 27, 2014

== Transactions ==
=== In ===
No.	Pos.	Nat.	Name	Age	Moving from		Type	Ends	Transfer fee	Date	Source
–	PF	(Croatia)	Dario Šarić	20	Cibona	(Croatia)	Transfer	2016 (Note: Dario Šarić signed a contract with an option for a third year.)	€1.2M	24 June 2014	
–	C	(Serbia)	Nenad Krstić	30	CSKA Moscow	(Russia)	Free agency	2016	–	23 June 2014	
–	G	(United States)	Matt Janning	26	Montepaschi Siena	(Italy)	Free agency	2015 (Note: Matt Janning signed a 1+1 contract.)	–	10 July 2014	
–	PG	(United States)	Dontaye Draper	29	Real Madrid	(Spain)	Free agency	2016	–	2 July 2014	
–	C	(Gabon)	Stéphane Lasme	31	Panathinaikos	(Greece)	Free agency	2016	–	22 June 2014	
–	SF	(Greece)	Stratos Perperoglou	29	Olympiacos	(Greece)	Free agency	2016	–	18 June 2014	
–	PG	(France)	Thomas Heurtel	25	Laboral Kutxa Vitoria	(Spain)	Transfer	2017	€1M	27 December 2014	

=== Out ===
No.	Pos.	Nat.	Name	Age	Moving to		Type	Transfer fee	Date	Source
9	C	(Turkey)	Semih Erden	27	Fenerbahçe Ülker	(Turkey)	Free agency	–	27 June 2014	
12	PF	(Turkey)	Kerem Gönlüm	36	Galatasaray Liv Hospital	(Turkey)	Team opts out	–	27 June 2014	
22	G	(United States)	Jamon Gordon	29	Darüşşafaka	(Turkey)	End of contract	–	21 June 2014	
12	SF	(Greece)	Kostas Vasileiadis	30	Unicaja Málaga	(Spain)	End of contract	–	21 June 2014	
30	SF	(United States)	D.J. Stephens	23	New Orleans Pelicans	(United States)	End of contract	–	21 June 2014	
42	C	(Croatia)	Stanko Barać	27	Cedevita Zagreb	(Croatia)	End of contract	–	21 June 2014	
20	PF	(Serbia)	Duško Savanović	30	Bayern Munich	(Germany)	End of contract	–	21 June 2014	
