= 2009–10 Hofstra Pride men's basketball team =

American college basketball season

2009–10 Hofstra Pride men's basketball

CBI, First Round
- Conference: Colonial Athletic Association
- Record: 19–15 (10–8 CAA)
- Head coach: Tom Pecora (9th season)
- Associate head coach: Van Macon (3rd season)
- Assistant coaches: David Duke (10th season); Michael Kelly (4th season)
- Home arena: Mack Sports Complex

2009–10 CAA men's basketball standings
	Conf.				Overall
Team	W		L	PCT	W		L	PCT
Old Dominion †	15	–	3	.833	27	–	9	.750
Northeastern	14	–	4	.778	20	–	13	.606
William & Mary	12	–	6	.667	22	–	11	.667
George Mason	12	–	6	.667	17	–	15	.531
VCU	11	–	7	.611	27	–	9	.750
Drexel	11	–	7	.611	16	–	16	.500
Hofstra	10	–	8	.556	19	–	15	.559
Towson	6	–	12	.333	10	–	21	.323
Georgia State	5	–	13	.278	12	–	20	.375
UNCW	5	–	13	.278	9	–	22	.290
James Madison	4	–	14	.222	13	–	20	.394
Delaware	3	–	15	.167	7	–	24	.226
† 2010 CAA tournament winner Rankings from AP poll

The 2009–10 Hofstra Pride men's basketball team represented Hofstra University in the 2009–10 NCAA Division I men's basketball season. The Pride were led by head coach Tom Pecora in his ninth year leading the team. Hofstra played their home games at Mack Sports Complex in Hempstead, New York, as members of the Colonial Athletic Association.

The Pride finished conference play with a 10–8 record, earning the seventh seed in the CAA tournament. Hofstra won its first-round game, but were defeated in the quarterfinals by Northeastern.

Boston University failed to qualify for the NCAA tournament, but were invited to the 2010 College Basketball Invitational. The Pride were eliminated in the first round of the CBI by IUPUI, 74–60.

This was Pecora's final season as head coach of the Pride. One week after the end of Hofstra's season, Pecora was hired as head coach of the Fordham Rams.

The Pride finished the season with a 19–15 record.

== Roster ==
2009–10 Hofstra Pride men's basketball team
Players
Coaches

Pos.	#	Name	Height	Weight	Year	Hometown
G	1	Nathaniel Lester	6 ft 5 in (1.96 m)	200 lb (91 kg)	Jr	Brooklyn, New York
F	2	Miklos Szabo	6 ft 9 in (2.06 m)	250 lb (113 kg)	Sr	Szeghalom, Hungary
G	3	Brad Kelleher	6 ft 0 in (1.83 m)	185 lb (84 kg)	Jr	Victoria, Australia
G	5	Chaz Williams	5 ft 9 in (1.75 m)	170 lb (77 kg)	Fr	Brooklyn, New York
F	11	David Imes	6 ft 7 in (2.01 m)	230 lb (104 kg)	Fr	Brooklyn, New York
F	12	Paul Bilbo	6 ft 8 in (2.03 m)	230 lb (104 kg)	Fr	Oyster Bay, New York
F	15	Halil Kanacević	6 ft 8 in (2.03 m)	245 lb (111 kg)	Fr	Staten Island, NY
G	20	Yves Jules	6 ft 2 in (1.88 m)	180 lb (82 kg)	Fr	Brooklyn, New York
G	22	Charles Jenkins	6 ft 3 in (1.91 m)	220 lb (100 kg)	Jr	Queens, New York
G	23	Cornelius Vines	6 ft 2 in (1.88 m)	190 lb (86 kg)	Sr	Syracuse, New York
G	31	Mike Moore	6 ft 5 in (1.96 m)	195 lb (88 kg)	Jr	New Haven, Connecticut
F	32	Greg Washington	6 ft 10 in (2.08 m)	215 lb (98 kg)	Jr	Centereach, New York
G	35	Matt Grogan	6 ft 5 in (1.96 m)	195 lb (88 kg)	Fr	Middle Village, New York

Head coach

- Tom Pecora (Adelphi)

Assistant coach(es)

- Van Macon (Southampton)
- David Duke (Albany)
- Michael Kelly (Haverford)

Legend

- (C) Team captain
- (S) Suspended
- (I) Ineligible
- (W) Walk-on
- Injured
- Current redshirt

Roster
Last update: February 18, 2023

== Schedule and results ==
Date time, TV	Rank^{#}	Opponent^{#}	Result	Record	Site (attendance) city, state
Regular season
November 13, 2009*; 8:00 pm		at No. 1 Kansas	L 65–101	0–1	Allen Fieldhouse (16,300); Lawrence, KS
November 16, 2009*; 7:00 pm		vs. Yale; NIT Season Tip-Off	W 68–63	1–1	Harry A. Gampel Pavilion (8,562); Storrs, CT
November 17, 2009*; 7:00 pm		at No. 12 Connecticut; NIT Season Tip-Off	L 67–76	1–2	Harry A. Gampel Pavilion (8,713); Storrs, CT
November 20, 2009*; 7:00 pm		Farmingdale State	W 87–48	2–2	Mack Sports Complex (2,655); Hempstead, NY
November 23, 2009*; 7:00 pm		Elon; NIT Season Tip-Off	W 70–46	3–2	Mack Sports Complex (737); Hempstead, NY
November 24, 2009*; 7:00 pm		Charlotte; NIT Season Tip-Off	L 72–80	3–3	Mack Sports Complex (783); Hempstead, NY
November 30, 2009*; 7:00 pm		Fairfield	W 84–80	4–3	Mack Sports Complex (2,146); Hempstead, NY
December 5, 2009; 4:00 pm		at Towson	W 84–64	5–3 (1–0)	Towson Center (1,376); Towson, MD
December 9, 2009*; 7:00 pm, FiOS1		Manhattan	W 44–39	6–3	Mack Sports Complex (3,076); Hempstead, NY
December 12, 2009*; 4:00 pm, FiOS1		New Hampshire	W 75–58	7–3	Mack Sports Complex (2,687); Hempstead, NY
December 20, 2009*; 2:30 pm, MSG		at St. John's; Aeropostale Holiday Festival	L 60–72	7–4	Madison Square Garden (5,780); New York, NY
December 21, 2009*; 7:00 pm, MSG		vs. Davidson; Aeropostale Holiday Festival	L 52–61	7–5	Madison Square Garden (5,210); New York, NY
December 29, 2010*; 7:00 pm		at Florida Atlantic	W 67–63	8–5	FAU Arena (1,123); Boca Raton, FL
January 2, 2010; 4:00 pm		William & Mary	L 47–48	8–6 (1–1)	Mack Sports Complex (3,132); Hempstead, NY
January 4, 2010; 7:00 pm, FiOS1		at George Mason	L 63–67	8–7 (1–2)	Patriot Center (3,826); Fairfax, VA
January 6, 2010; 7:00 pm		Towson	W 77–61	9–7 (2–2)	Mack Sports Complex (2,061); Hempstead, NY
January 9, 2010; 4:00 pm, MSG		at Old Dominion	L 46–57	9–8 (2–3)	Constant Convocation Center (6,834); Norfolk, VA
January 12, 2010; 7:00 pm, ESPNU		VCU	L 68–81	9–9 (2–4)	Mack Sports Complex (2,224); Hempstead, NY
January 16, 2010; 7:00 pm		at William & Mary	L 66–73	9–10 (2–5)	Kaplan Arena (3,414); Williamsburg, VA
January 19, 2010; 7:00 pm, ESPNU		George Mason	L 72–90	9–11 (2–6)	Mack Sports Complex (2,573); Hempstead, NY
January 23, 2010; 12:00 pm, MSG		at Drexel	L 62–75	9–12 (2–7)	Daskalakis Athletic Center (1,732); Philadelphia, PA
January 27, 2010; 7:00 pm		UNC Wilmington	W 93–54	10–12 (3–7)	Mack Sports Complex (2,525); Hempstead, NY
January 30, 2010; 4:00 pm		Delaware	W 77–67	11–12 (4–7)	Mack Sports Complex (4,019); Hempstead, NY
February 3, 2010; 7:00 pm		at James Madison	W 68–48	12–12 (5–7)	JMU Convocation Center (3,522); Harrisonburg, VA
February 6, 2010; 4:00 pm		Northeastern	L 55–75	12–13 (5–8)	Mack Sports Complex (3,417); Hempstead, NY
February 10, 2010; 7:00 pm		Drexel	W 75–64	13–13 (6–8)	Mack Sports Complex (893); Hempstead, NY
February 13, 2010; 7:00 pm		at UNC Wilmington	W 87–70	14–13 (7–8)	Trask Coliseum (2,462); Wilmington, NC
February 16, 2010; 7:00 pm		at Delaware	W 82–69	15–13 (8–8)	Bob Carpenter Center (2,090); Newark, DE
February 20, 2010*; 4:00 pm		Rider; ESPN BracketBusters	W 92–89 ^{OT}	16–13	Mack Sports Complex (3,119); Hempstead, NY
February 23, 2010; 9:00 pm, ESPNU		at Northeastern	W 73–62	17–13 (9–8)	Matthews Arena (1,954); Boston, MA
February 27, 2010; 4:00 pm		Georgia State	W 87–74	18–13 (10–8)	Mack Sports Complex (3,694); Hempstead, NY
CAA tournament
March 5, 2010; 6:00 pm	(7)	vs. (10) Georgia State; CAA First Round	W 68–67	19–13	Richmond Coliseum (5,494); Richmond, VA
March 6, 2010; 6:00 pm	(7)	vs. (2) Northeastern; CAA Quarterfinals	L 71–74 ^{2OT}	19–14	Richmond Coliseum (5,461); Richmond, VA
CBI
March 17, 2010; 10:00 pm		IUPUI; CBI First Round	L 60–74	19–15	Mack Sports Complex (952); Hempstead, NY
*Non-conference game. ^{#}Rankings from AP Poll. (#) Tournament seedings in parentheses. All times are in Eastern Time. Source
