= 2009–10 VCU Rams men's basketball team =

American college basketball season

2009–10 VCU Rams men's basketball

College Basketball Invitational Champions
- Conference: Colonial Athletic Association
- Record: 27–9 (11–7 CAA)
- Head coach: Shaka Smart
- Assistant coaches: Will Wade; Mike Rhoades; Mike Jones
- Home arena: Stuart C. Siegel Center

2009–10 CAA men's basketball standings
	Conf.				Overall
Team	W		L	PCT	W		L	PCT
Old Dominion †	15	–	3	.833	27	–	9	.750
Northeastern	14	–	4	.778	20	–	13	.606
William & Mary	12	–	6	.667	22	–	11	.667
George Mason	12	–	6	.667	17	–	15	.531
VCU	11	–	7	.611	27	–	9	.750
Drexel	11	–	7	.611	16	–	16	.500
Hofstra	10	–	8	.556	19	–	15	.559
Towson	6	–	12	.333	10	–	21	.323
Georgia State	5	–	13	.278	12	–	20	.375
UNCW	5	–	13	.278	9	–	22	.290
James Madison	4	–	14	.222	13	–	20	.394
Delaware	3	–	15	.167	7	–	24	.226
† 2010 CAA tournament winner Rankings from AP poll

The 2009–10 VCU Rams men's basketball team represented Virginia Commonwealth University during the 2009–10 college basketball season. This was head coach Shaka Smart's first season at VCU. The Rams compete in the Colonial Athletic Association and played their home games at Stuart C. Siegel Center. They finished the season 27–9, 11–7 in CAA play and lost in the semifinals of the 2010 CAA men's basketball tournament. They were champions of the 2010 College Basketball Invitational.

== Preseason ==
In the CAA preseason polls, released October 20 in Washington, DC, VCU was predicted to finish third in the CAA. Jr. forward Larry Sanders was selected to the preseason all conference first team.

== Roster ==
#	Name	Height	Weight (lbs.)	Position	Class	Hometown	Previous Team(s)
1	Larry Sanders	6'11"	235	F	Jr.	Fort Pierce, FL	Port St. Lucie HS
2	Issiah Grayson	5'11"	160	G	Fr.	Atlanta, GA	Findlay Prep
4	Terrance Saintil	6'8"	240	F	So.	North Miami, FL	Monsignor Edward Pace HS
10	Darius Theus	6'3"	195	G	Fr.	Portsmouth, VA	I. C. Norcom HS
11	Kirill Pishchalnikov	6'8"	265	F	Sr.	Maykop, Russia	MGGTK AGU
12	Joey Rodriguez	5'10"	175	G	Jr.	Oviedo, FL	Lake Howell HS
20	Bradford Burgess	6'5"	215	G	So.	Midlothian, VA	Benedictine HS
21	Jamie Skeen	6'9"	245	F	Jr.	Charlotte, NC	North Mecklenburg HS; Wake Forest
30	Troy Daniels	6'4"	195	G	Fr.	Roanoke, VA	William Fleming HS
32	Brandon Rozzell	6'2"	185	G	Jr.	Richmond, VA	Highland Springs HS
34	David Hinton	6'8"	230	F	Fr.	Winston-Salem, NC	RJ Reynolds HS
42	T.J. Gwynn	6'4"	205	F	Sr.	Burlington, NC	Cummings HS
50	Ed Nixon	6'4"	200	G	Jr.	St. Petersburg, FL	Lakewood HS

== Schedule and results ==
Date time, TV	Rank^{#}	Opponent^{#}	Result	Record	Site (attendance) city, state
Exhibition
11/5/2009*; 7:30pm		Virginia Union; U.S Army Downtown Showdown	W 85–55	—	Stuart C. Siegel Center; Richmond, VA
Regular season
11/13/2009*; 7:30pm		Bethune–Cookman	W 77–51	1–0	Stuart C. Siegel Center (6,741); Richmond, VA
11/18/2009*; 7:00pm		at Western Michigan	L 67–83	1–1	University Arena (2,654); Kalamazoo, MI
11/21/2009*; 7:30pm		No. 17 Oklahoma	W 82–69	2–1	Stuart C. Siegel Center; Richmond, VA
11/23/2009*; 7:00pm		at Hampton	W 63–52	3–1	Hampton Convocation Center (3,214); Hampton, VA
11/27/2009*; 7:30pm		Nevada	W 85–76	4–1	Stuart C. Siegel Center (5,769); Richmond, VA
12/2/2009*; 7:30pm		Rhode Island	W 82–80	5–1	Stuart C. Siegel Center (5,229); Richmond, VA
12/5/2009; 12:00pm, CSNW/CSS		at William & Mary	L 74–75	5–2 (0–1)	Kaplan Arena (3,215); Williamsburg, VA
12/12/2009*; 7:30pm		Richmond; Black & Blue Classic	W 65–57	6–2	Stuart C. Siegel Center (7,567); Richmond, VA
12/19/2009*; 2:00pm		at Tulane	W 78–77	7–2	Fogelman Arena (1,769); New Orleans, LA
12/29/2009*; 7:30pm		East Carolina	W 82–74	8–2	Stuart C. Siegel Center (7,124); Richmond, VA
1/2/2010; 2:00pm		UNC Wilmington	W 91–57	9–2 (1–1)	Stuart C. Siegel Center (5,828); Richmond, VA
1/4/2010; 7:00pm, CSNW/CSS		Northeastern	L 57–62	9–3 (1–2)	Stuart C. Siegel Center (5,741); Richmond, VA
1/6/2010; 7:00pm		at Drexel	L 72–75	9–4 (1–3)	Daskalakis Athletic Center (1,417); Philadelphia, PA
1/9/2010; 2:00pm		Delaware	W 77–64	10–4 (2–3)	Stuart C. Siegel Center (7,152); Richmond, VA
1/12/2010; 7:00pm, ESPNU		at Hofstra	W 81–68	11–4 (3–3)	Hofstra Arena (2,224); Hempstead, NY
1/16/2010; 6:00pm		at Georgia State	W 82–69	12–4 (4–3)	GSU Sports Arena (1,697); Atlanta, GA
1/20/2010; 7:00pm		William & Mary	W 81–59	13–4 (5–3)	Stuart C. Siegel Center (7,524); Richmond, VA
1/23/2010; 1:00pm, TCN/CSNW/CSS		at Northeastern	L 62–74	13–5 (5–4)	Matthews Arena (2,858); Boston, MA
1/27/2010; 7:30pm		Towson	W 112–53	14–5 (6–4)	Stuart C. Siegel Center (5,384); Richmond, VA
1/30/2010; 2:00pm, CSN+		Georgia State	W 78–62	15–5 (7–4)	Stuart C. Siegel Center (4,548); Richmond, VA
2/3/2010; 7:00pm		at UNC Wilmington	W 73–68	16–5 (8–4)	Trask Coliseum (2,375); Wilmington, NC
2/6/2010; 4:00pm, TCN/CSNW/CSS		Old Dominion; Rivalry	W 70–58	17–5 (9–4)	Stuart C. Siegel Center (7,556); Richmond, VA
2/9/2010; 7:00pm, ESPNU		at George Mason	L 77–82	17–6 (9–5)	Patriot Center (5,486); Fairfax, VA
2/13/2010; 6:00pm, TCN/CSNW		at James Madison	L 71–76	17–7 (9–6)	JMU Convocation Center (5,398); Harrisonburg, VA
2/16/2010; 7:00pm, TCN/CSNW		Drexel	W 73–54	18–7 (10–6)	Stuart C. Siegel Center (5,127); Richmond, VA
2/20/2010*; 7:00pm, ESPNU		at Akron; ESPN BracketBusters	W 70–53	19–7	Stuart C. Siegel Center (3,882); Richmond, VA
2/24/2010; 7:30pm		at James Madison	W 76–62	20–7 (11–6)	Stuart C. Siegel Center (6,873); Richmond, VA
2/27/2010; 4:00pm, CSNW		at Old Dominion; Rivalry	L 70–73	20–8 (11–7)	Ted Constant Convocation Center (8,424); Norfolk, VA
CAA Tournament
3/5/2010; 6:00pm	(5)	vs. (12) Delaware; CAA First Round	W 66–49	21–8	Richmond Coliseum (4,854); Richmond, VA
3/6/2010; 2:30pm, CSN	(5)	vs. (4) George Mason; CAA Quarterfinals	W 75–60	22–8	Richmond Coliseum (8,908); Richmond, VA
3/7/2010; 3:00pm, CSN	(5)	vs. (1) Old Dominion; CAA Semifinals	L 69–73 ^{OT}	22–9	Richmond Coliseum; Richmond, VA
CBI
3/16/2010; 7:00pm, HDNet		at George Washington; CBI First Round	W 79–73	23–9	Charles E. Smith Athletic Center (793); Washington, DC
3/22/2010; 7:00pm, HDNet		College of Charleston; CBI Quarterfinals	W 93–86	24–9	Stuart C. Siegel Center (3,297); Richmond, VA
3/24/2010; 7:00pm, HDNet		Boston University; CBI Semifinals	W 88–75	25–9	Stuart C. Siegel Center (3,352); Richmond, VA
3/29/2010; 7:00pm, HDNet		Saint Louis; CBI Finals – Game 1	W 68–56	26–9	Stuart C. Siegel Center (4,386); Richmond, VA
3/31/2010; 8:00pm, HDNet		at Saint Louis; CBI Finals – Game 2	W 71–65	27–9	Chaifetz Arena (5,612); Saint Louis, MO
*Non-conference game. ^{#}Rankings from AP Poll. (#) Tournament seedings in parentheses. All times are in Eastern Time. Source
