= 2009–10 Northeastern Huskies men's basketball team =

American college basketball season

2009–10 Northeastern Huskies men's basketball

NIT, First Round
- Conference: Colonial Athletic Association
- Record: 20–13 (14–4 CAA)
- Head coach: Bill Coen
- Assistant coaches: Tom Murphy; Jim McCarthy; Antonio Reynolds-Dean
- Home arena: Matthews Arena

2009–10 CAA men's basketball standings
	Conf.				Overall
Team	W		L	PCT	W		L	PCT
Old Dominion †	15	–	3	.833	27	–	9	.750
Northeastern	14	–	4	.778	20	–	13	.606
William & Mary	12	–	6	.667	22	–	11	.667
George Mason	12	–	6	.667	17	–	15	.531
VCU	11	–	7	.611	27	–	9	.750
Drexel	11	–	7	.611	16	–	16	.500
Hofstra	10	–	8	.556	19	–	15	.559
Towson	6	–	12	.333	10	–	21	.323
Georgia State	5	–	13	.278	12	–	20	.375
UNCW	5	–	13	.278	9	–	22	.290
James Madison	4	–	14	.222	13	–	20	.394
Delaware	3	–	15	.167	7	–	24	.226
† 2010 CAA tournament winner Rankings from AP poll

The 2009–10 Northeastern Huskies men's basketball team represented Northeastern University during the 2009–10 college basketball season. This was Bill Coen's fourth season as head coach at Northeastern. The Huskies competed in the Colonial Athletic Association and play their home games at Matthews Arena. They finished the season 20–13, 14–4 in CAA play to finish in second place. They lost in the semifinals of the 2010 CAA men's basketball tournament to William & Mary and were invited to play in the 2010 National Invitation Tournament where they lost in the first round to Connecticut.

== Preseason ==
In the CAA preseason polls, released October 20 in Washington, DC, Northeastern was predicted to finish second in the CAA. Sr. guard/forward Matt Janning was selected to the preseason all conference first team and Sr. forward Manny Adako was selected the second team.

== Roster ==
#	Name	Height	Weight (lbs.)	Position	Class	Hometown	Previous Team(s)
1	Chris Avenant	6'4"	193	G/F	Fr.	Sacramento, CA	Sacramento HS
3	Chaisson Allen	6'4"	190	G	Jr.	Murfreesboro, TN	Oakland HS
10	Kauri Black	6'7"	213	F	Fr.	Rialto, CA	Eisenhower HS
11	Vinny Lima	6'10"	210	F	Jr.	São Vicente, Cape Verde	Jose Augusto Pinto
14	Jonathan Lee	6'2"	196	G	Fr.	Flint, MI	Carman-Ainsworth HS
15	Brian McDonald	6'2"	180	G	Sr.	Southbury, CT	Pomperaug HS
20	Joel Smith	6'4"	175	G	Fr.	Leander, TX	Leander HS
21	Dinko Marshavelski	6'11"	240	F	Fr.	Plovdiv, Bulgaria	Wilbraham & Monson Academy
22	Alwayne Bigby	6'5"	207	G/F	Fr.	Toronto, Ontario Canada	Eastern Commerce C.I.
23	Matt Janning	6'4"	198	G/F	Sr.	Watertown, MN	Watertown-Mayer HS
24	Mathiang Muo	6'6"	227	G/F	Fr.	Sydney, Australia	Patterson School; Quinnipiac
25	Baptiste Bataille	5'10"	189	G	Sr.	Férin, France	Community Christian
32	Manny Adako	6'8"	254	F	Sr.	Decatur, GA	The Winchendon School
33	Ben Felix	6'11"	240	C	So.	Mill Bay, British Columbia Canada	Brentwood College School
54	Nkem Ojougboh	6'9"	220	C	Sr.	Scottsdale, AZ	Scottsdale Christian Academy; Texas San Antonio

== Schedule and results ==
- All times are Eastern

Date time, TV	Rank^{#}	Opponent^{#}	Result	Record	Site (attendance) city, state
Regular season
11/17/2009*; 12:00pm, ESPN		at Siena	L 53–59	0–1	Times Union Center (6,445); Albany, NY
11/21/2009*; 12:00pm		Utah State	W 64–61	1–1	Matthews Arena (1,927); Boston, MA
11/25/2009*; 4:00pm		at Boston University	L 64–69 ^{OT}	1–2	Case Gym (575); Boston, MA
11/28/2009*; 2:00pm		Wright State	W 70–67	2–2	Matthews Arena (945); Boston, MA
12/1/2009*; 7:00pm, Cox		Providence	L 72–76	2–3	Matthews Arena (2,622); Boston, MA
12/5/2009; 4:00pm, TCN		at Drexel	L 47–49	2–4 (0–1)	Daskalakis Athletic Center (1,565); Philadelphia, PA
12/10/2009*; 7:00pm, Cox		at Rhode Island	L 76–79	2–5	Ryan Center (4,271); Kingston, RI
12/22/2009; 3:00pm, ESPNU		vs. Saint Mary's; Diamond Head Classic	L 67–78	2–6	Stan Sheriff Center; Honolulu, HI
12/23/2009*; 3:00pm, ESPNU		vs. Western Michigan; Diamond Head Classic	L 60–75	2–7	Stan Sheriff Center; Honolulu, HI
12/25/2009*; 2:00pm		vs. SMU; Diamond Head Classic	W 73–62	3–7	Stan Sheriff Center; Honolulu, HI
12/29/2009*; 9:00pm		at Santa Clara; Cable Car Classic	W 62–50	4–7	Leavey Center (1,480); Santa Clara, CA
12/30/2009*; 11:00pm		vs. Kent State; Cable Car Classic	W 61–58	5–7	Leavey Center; Santa Clara, CA
1/2/2010; 4:00pm		James Madison	W 73–61	6–7 (1–1)	Matthews Arena (824); Boston, MA
1/4/2010; 7:00pm, CSN		at VCU	W 62–57	7–7 (2–1)	Stuart C. Siegel Center (5,741); Richmond, VA
1/7/2010; 7:00pm, CSN		George Mason	W 71–46	8–7 (3–1)	Matthews Arena (1,148); Boston, MA
1/9/2010; 7:00pm, CSN-NE/CSS		at Georgia State	W 66–54	9–7 (4–1)	GSU Sports Arena (1,170); Atlanta, GA
1/13/2010; 7:00pm		Delaware	W 59–55	10–7 (5–1)	Matthews Arena (1,510); Boston, MA
1/16/2010; 1:00pm		UNC Wilmington	W 79–56	11–7 (6–1)	Matthews Arena (1,429); Boston, MA
1/20/2010; 7:00pm		at Towson	W 73–48	12–7 (7–1)	Towson Center (1,146); Towson, MD
1/23/2010; 2:00pm, TCN/CSN-NE		VCU	W 74–62	13–7 (8–1)	Matthews Arena (2,858); Boston, MA
1/27/2010; 7:00pm		Drexel	L 48–61	13–8 (8–2)	Matthews Arena (2,145); Boston, MA
1/30/2010; 4:00pm, CSN		Old Dominion	W 74–64	14–8 (9–2)	Matthews Arena (3,061); Boston, MA
2/2/2010; 9:00pm, ESPNU		at Delaware	W 67–51	15–8 (10–2)	Bob Carpenter Center (2,356); Newark, DE
2/6/2010; 4:00pm		at Hofstra	W 75–55	16–8 (11–2)	Hofstra Arena (3,417); Hempstead, NY
2/10/2010; 7:00pm		Georgia State	W 62–53	17–8 (12–2)	Matthews Arena (2,065); Boston, MA
2/13/2010; 7:00pm		at William & Mary	L 52–53	17–9 (12–3)	Kaplan Arena (3,882); Williamsburg, VA
2/16/2010; 7:00pm		at UNC Wilmington	W 65–56	18–9 (13–3)	Trask Coliseum (2,339); Wilmington, NC
2/20/2010*; 1:00pm, ESPN2		Louisiana Tech; ESPN BracketBusters	L 67–70	18–10	Matthews Arena (4,414); Boston, MA
2/23/2010; 9:00pm, ESPNU		Hofstra	L 62–73	18–11 (13–4)	Matthews Arena (1,954); Boston, MA
2/27/2010; 12:00pm, ESPN2		George Mason	W 50–48	19–11 (14–4)	Patriot Center (8,940); Fairfax, VA
CAA tournament
3/6/2010; 6:00pm, CSN-NE	(2)	vs. (7) Hofstra; Quarterfinals	W 74–71 ^{2OT}	20–11	Richmond Coliseum; Richmond, VA
3/7/2010; 5:30pm, CSN-NE	(2)	vs. (3) William & Mary; Semifinals	L 45–47	20–12	Richmond Coliseum (11,200); Richmond, VA
NIT
3/16/2010; 7:00pm, ESPN2	(5 VT)	at (4 VT) Connecticut; NIT First Round	L 57–59	20–13	Gampel Pavilion (5,571); Storrs, CT
*Non-conference game. ^{#}Rankings from AP Poll. (#) Tournament seedings in parentheses. VT=NIT Virginia Tech bracket.
