= 2009–10 William & Mary Tribe men's basketball team =

American college basketball season

2009–10 William & Mary Tribe men's basketball

NIT, First Round
- Conference: Colonial Athletic Association
- Record: 22–11 (12–6 CAA)
- Head coach: Tony Shaver (7th season)
- Assistant coach: Jamion Christian
- Home arena: Kaplan Arena

2009–10 CAA men's basketball standings
	Conf.				Overall
Team	W		L	PCT	W		L	PCT
Old Dominion †	15	–	3	.833	27	–	9	.750
Northeastern	14	–	4	.778	20	–	13	.606
William & Mary	12	–	6	.667	22	–	11	.667
George Mason	12	–	6	.667	17	–	15	.531
VCU	11	–	7	.611	27	–	9	.750
Drexel	11	–	7	.611	16	–	16	.500
Hofstra	10	–	8	.556	19	–	15	.559
Towson	6	–	12	.333	10	–	21	.323
Georgia State	5	–	13	.278	12	–	20	.375
UNCW	5	–	13	.278	9	–	22	.290
James Madison	4	–	14	.222	13	–	20	.394
Delaware	3	–	15	.167	7	–	24	.226
† 2010 CAA tournament winner Rankings from AP poll

The 2009–10 William & Mary Tribe men's basketball team represented The College of William & Mary during the 2009–10 college basketball season. This was head coach Tony Shaver's seventh season at William & Mary. The Tribe competed in the Colonial Athletic Association and played their home games at Kaplan Arena. They finished the season 22–11, 12–6 in CAA play and lost in the championship game of the 2010 CAA men's basketball tournament to Old Dominion. They were invited to play in the 2010 National Invitation Tournament where they lost in the first round to North Carolina.

== Preseason ==
In the CAA preseason polls, released October 20 in Washington, D.C., William & Mary was predicted to finish tenth in the CAA. Sr. guard David Schneider was selected to the preseason all conference second team.

== Roster ==
#	Name	Height	Weight (lbs.)	Position	Class	Hometown	Previous Team(s)
0	Steven Hess	6'10"	245	F	Sr.	Charlotte, North Carolina, United States	Gaston Day School
1	Kendrix Brown	6'3"	205	G	So.	Norfolk, Virginia, United States	Norview HS
2	David Schneider	6'3"	190	G	Sr.	Phoenix, Arizona, United States	Brophy Prep
11	Doug Howard II	5'9"	150	G	Fr.	Leesburg, Virginia, United States	Flint Hill School
13	Andrew Pavloff	6'9"	210	F	Fr.	Akron, Ohio, United States	Walsh Jesuit HS
20	Quinn McDowell	6'6"	212	G F	So.	Mason, Ohio, United States	Moeller HS
22	Danny Sumner	6'7"	225	F	Sr.	Fairfax, Virginia, United States	Paul VI Catholic High School
23	Kyle Gaillard	6'7"	210	F	Fr.	Huntersville, North Carolina, United States	North Mecklenburg HS
24	Sean McCurdy	6'1"	184	G	Sr.	Jersey City, New Jersey, United States	St. Anthony HS; Arkansas
31	Matt Rum	6'4"	180	G	Fr.	Chapel Hill, North Carolina, United States	Loyola Blakefield
33	JohnMark Ludwick	6'8"	230	F	So.	San Antonio, Texas, United States	Reagan HS; UT San Antonio
45	Marcus Kitts	6'9"	230	F	Jr.	Holly Springs, North Carolina, United States	Middle Creek

== Schedule and results ==
- All times are Eastern

Date time, TV	Rank^{#}	Opponent^{#}	Result	Record	Site (attendance) city, state
Regular Season
11/13/2009*; 7:30pm, SNY; WCTX		at No. 12 Connecticut	L 66–75	0–1	Harry A. Gampel Pavilion (9,719); Storrs, Connecticut
11/15/2009*; 2:00pm		at Harvard	L 85–87 ^{3OT}	0–2	Lavietes Pavilion (1,297); Cambridge, Massachusetts
11/19/2009*; 7:00pm		Richmond	W 78–71	1–2	Kaplan Arena (2,104); Williamsburg, Virginia
11/21/2009*; 2:00pm		at Manhattan	W 75–70	2–2	Draddy Gymnasium (1,654); Riverdale, New York
11/25/2009*; 7:00pm		Hampton	W 62–61	3–2	Kaplan Arena (1,687); Williamsburg, Virginia
11/28/2009*; 7:00pm		at Wake Forest	W 78–68	4–2	LJVM Coliseum (9,911); Winston-Salem, North Carolina
12/2/2009*; 7:00pm		Longwood	W 84–65	5–2	Kaplan Arena (1,958); Williamsburg, Virginia
12/5/2009; 12:00pm, CSN-Washington		VCU	W 75–74	6–2 (1–0)	Kaplan Arena (3,215); Williamsburg, Virginia
12/19/2009*; 1:00pm		Vassar	W 94–48	7–2	Kaplan Arena (2,215); Williamsburg, Virginia
12/22/2009*; 7:00pm		at Radford	W 70–68	8–2	Dedmon Center (5,361); Radford, Virginia
12/30/2009*; 7:30pm, CSN-Washington		at Maryland	W 83–77	9–2	Comcast Center (16,418); College Park, Maryland
1/2/2010; 4:00pm		at Hofstra	W 48–47	10–2 (2–0)	Mack Sports Complex (3,132); Hempstead, New York
1/4/2010; 7:00pm		UNC Wilmington	L 61–62	10–3 (2–1)	Kaplan Arena (3,196); Williamsburg, Virginia
1/6/2010; 7:00pm		at Delaware	W 74–73 ^{OT}	11–3 (3–1)	Bob Carpenter Center (2,720); Newark, Delaware
1/9/2010; 4:00pm		at Drexel	W 73–48	12–3 (4–1)	Daskalakis Center (6,957); Philadelphia
1/14/2010; 7:00pm, CSN-Washington		James Madison	W 85–78	13–3 (5–1)	Kaplan Arena (3,072); Williamsburg, Virginia
1/16/2010; 7:00pm		Hofstra	W 73–66	14–3 (6–1)	Kaplan Arena (3,414); Williamsburg, Virginia
1/20/2010; 7:30pm		at VCU	L 59–81	14–4 (6–2)	Stuart C. Siegel Center (7,524); Richmond, Virginia
1/23/2010; 7:00pm, WSKY		Old Dominion	L 55–58	14–5 (6–3)	Kaplan Arena (7,216); Williamsburg, Virginia
1/27/2010; 7:00pm		at James Madison	L 63–65	14–6 (6–4)	Convocation Center (3,496); Harrisonburg, Virginia
1/31/2010; 5:30pm		Drexel	W 54–51	15–6 (7–4)	Kaplan Arena (2,645); Williamsburg, Virginia
2/3/2010; 7:00pm		at Old Dominion	L 42–61	15–7 (7–5)	Ted Constant Convocation Center (8,015); Norfolk, Virginia
2/6/2010; 6:00pm		at Georgia State	W 59–56	16–7 (8–5)	GSU Sports Arena (2,347); Atlanta
2/10/2010; 7:00pm		Delaware	W 67–54	17–7 (9–5)	Kaplan Arena (2,586); Williamsburg, Virginia
2/13/2010; 7:00pm		Northeastern	W 53–52	18–7 (10–5)	Kaplan Arena (3,882); Williamsburg, Virginia
2/16/2010; 7:00pm, MASN		at George Mason	W 63–60	19–7 (11–5)	Patriot Center (5,539); Fairfax, Virginia
2/19/2010*; 9:00pm, ESPNU		at Iona; ESPN BracketBusters	L 53–69	19–8	Hynes Athletic Center (2,611); New Rochelle, New York
2/24/2010; 7:00pm		Towson	L 77–83	19–9 (11–6)	Kaplan Arena (3,217); Williamsburg, Virginia
2/27/2010; 8:00pm		at UNC Wilmington	W 62–51	20–9 (12–6)	Trask Coliseum (3,014); Wilmington, North Carolina
2010 CAA men's basketball tournament
3/6/2010; 9:06pm, CSN-NE		vs. James Madison; Quarterfinals	W 70–65	21–9	Richmond Coliseum (5,461); Richmond, Virginia
3/7/2010; 5:30pm, CSN-NE		vs. Northeastern; Semifinals	W 47–45	22–9	Richmond Coliseum (11,200); Richmond, Virginia
3/8/2010; 7:00pm, ESPN		vs. Old Dominion; Finals	L 53–60	22–10	Richmond Coliseum (8,455); Richmond, Virginia
2010 National Invitation Tournament
3/16/2010; 9:30pm, ESPN		at North Carolina; First Round	L 72–80	22–11	Carmichael Arena (6,822); Chapel Hill, North Carolina
*Non-conference game. ^{#}Rankings from AP Poll. (#) Tournament seedings in parentheses.
