= 2009–10 Drexel Dragons men's basketball team =

American college basketball season

2009–10 Drexel Dragons men's basketball
- Conference: Colonial Athletic Association
- Record: 16–16 (11–7 CAA)
- Head coach: Bruiser Flint (9th season)
- Assistant coach: Mike Connors (2nd season)
- MVP: Jamie Harris
- Home arena: Daskalakis Athletic Center

2009–10 CAA men's basketball standings
	Conf.				Overall
Team	W		L	PCT	W		L	PCT
Old Dominion †	15	–	3	.833	27	–	9	.750
Northeastern	14	–	4	.778	20	–	13	.606
William & Mary	12	–	6	.667	22	–	11	.667
George Mason	12	–	6	.667	17	–	15	.531
VCU	11	–	7	.611	27	–	9	.750
Drexel	11	–	7	.611	16	–	16	.500
Hofstra	10	–	8	.556	19	–	15	.559
Towson	6	–	12	.333	10	–	21	.323
Georgia State	5	–	13	.278	12	–	20	.375
UNCW	5	–	13	.278	9	–	22	.290
James Madison	4	–	14	.222	13	–	20	.394
Delaware	3	–	15	.167	7	–	24	.226
† 2010 CAA tournament winner Rankings from AP poll

The 2009–10 Drexel Dragons men's basketball team represented Drexel University during the 2009–10 NCAA Division I men's basketball season. The Dragons, led by 9th year head coach Bruiser Flint, played their home games at the Daskalakis Athletic Center and were members of the Colonial Athletic Association. They lost in the first round of the CAA tournament to James Madison.

== Roster ==
2009–10 Drexel Dragons men's basketball team
Players
Coaches

Pos.	#	Name	Height	Weight	Year	Previous school	Hometown
F	1	Yannick Formbor	6 ft 8 in (2.03 m)	245 lb (111 kg)	RS Jr	St. Patrick's	Roselle, NJ
G	3	Chris Fouch	6 ft 2 in (1.88 m)	170 lb (77 kg)	RS Fr	Rice	Bronx, NY
F	5	Leon Spencer	6 ft 8 in (2.03 m)	217 lb (98 kg)	Sr	Brunswick Community College	Charlotte, NC
G	11	Gerald Colds	6 ft 1 in (1.85 m)	180 lb (82 kg)	Jr	St. Raymond's	New York, NY
G	12	Jamie Harris	5 ft 10 in (1.78 m)	175 lb (79 kg)	Jr	Wings Academy	New York, NY
G	15	Ronald Colbert	6 ft 2 in (1.88 m)	185 lb (84 kg)	Jr	Thomas Stone	Capitol Heights, MD
F	21	Kevin Phillip (W)	6 ft 6 in (1.98 m)	225 lb (102 kg)	So	Bishop Loughlin	Brooklyn, NY
G	32	Derrick Thomas	6 ft 4 in (1.93 m)	190 lb (86 kg)	Fr	St. John's College High School (D.C.)	New York, NY
F	33	Evan Neisler	6 ft 8 in (2.03 m)	225 lb (102 kg)	RS Sr	Word of God Christian Academy	Raleigh, NC
F	33	Kenny Tribbett	6 ft 9 in (2.06 m)	240 lb (109 kg)	RS Sr	Chester (Pa.)	Berlin, NJ
F	44	Daryl McCoy	6 ft 9 in (2.06 m)	270 lb (122 kg)	So	Hartford Public	Hartford, CT
F	45	Samme Givens	6 ft 5 in (1.96 m)	220 lb (100 kg)	Jr	Academy of the New Church	Philadelphia, PA
G	54	Shannon Givens	6 ft 0 in (1.83 m)	190 lb (86 kg)	Fr	Fels	Philadelphia, PA

Head coach

- James "Bruiser" Flint (Saint Joseph's)

Assistant coach(es)

- Mike Connors (Ithaca)

Legend

- (C) Team captain
- (S) Suspended
- (I) Ineligible
- (W) Walk-on
- Injured
- Current redshirt

Roster
Last update: August 13, 2014

== Schedule ==
Date time, TV	Rank^{#}	Opponent^{#}	Result	Record	Site city, state
Regular season
November 13, 2009*; 7:00 pm, TCN		at Saint Joseph's	L 67-77 ^{OT}	0-1	Hagan Arena (4,200); Philadelphia, PA
November 17, 2009*; 8:00 am, ESPN		at Niagara	L 69-76	0-2	Gallagher Center; Lewiston, NY
November 20, 2009*; 7:30 pm		at Rutgers; Legends Classic	L 56-58	0-3	Louis Brown Athletic Center; Piscataway, NJ
November 24, 2009*; 7:00 pm, TCN		at Penn; Battle of 33rd Street	W 58-49	1-3	Palestra; Philadelphia, PA
November 27, 2009*; 4:30 pm		Vermont; Legends Classic	W 74-61	2-3	Daskalakis Athletic Center; Philadelphia, PA
November 28, 2009*; 4:30 pm, TCN		Toledo; Legends Classic	W 69-59	3-3	Daskalakis Athletic Center; Philadelphia, PA
November 29, 2009*; 2:30 pm		Cornell; Legends Classic	L 54-61	3-4	Daskalakis Athletic Center (1,033); Philadelphia, PA
December 2, 2009*; 7:00 pm		at No. 3 Villanova	L 58-77	3-5	The Pavilion (6,500); Villanova, PA
December 5, 2009; 4:00 pm, TCN		Northeastern	W 49-47	4-5 (1-0)	Daskalakis Athletic Center; Philadelphia, PA
December 13, 2009*; 1:00 pm		Saint Francis (PA)	W 57-35	5-5	Daskalakis Athletic Center; Philadelphia, PA
December 18, 2009*; 10:00 pm		at Cal State Northridge	W 75-63	6-5	Matadome; Northridge, CA
December 21, 2009*; 7:00 pm, ESPNU		at No. 3 Kentucky	L 44-88	6-6	Rupp Arena (24,354); Lexington, KY
December 29, 2009*; 7:00 pm, TCN		Rhode Island	W 80-79	6-7	Daskalakis Athletic Center; Philadelphia, PA
January 2, 2010; 2:00 pm, TCN		at Delaware	L 58-62	6-8 (1-1)	Bob Carpenter Center; Newark, DE
January 4, 2010; 7:00 pm		Georgia State	W 72-57	7-8 (2-1)	GSU Sports Arena; Atlanta, GA
January 6, 2010; 7:00 pm		VCU	W 75-72	8-8 (3-1)	Daskalakis Athletic Center; Philadelphia, PA
January 9, 2010; 4:00 pm		William and Mary	L 48-73	8-9 (3-2)	Daskalakis Athletic Center; Philadelphia, PA
January 13, 2010; 7:00 pm		at Towson	W 52-49	9-9 (4-2)	Towson Center; Towson, MD
January 16, 2010; 7:00 pm		at Old Dominion	L 48-71	9-10 (4-3)	Ted Constant Convocation Center; Norfolk, VA
January 20, 2010; 7:00 pm, TCN		James Madison	W 78-57	10-10 (5-3)	Daskalakis Athletic Center; Philadelphia, PA
January 23, 2010; 12:00 pm, TCN		Hofstra	W 75-62	11-10 (6-3)	Daskalakis Athletic Center; Philadelphia, PA
January 27, 2010; 7:00 pm		at Northeastern	W 61-48	12-10 (7-3)	Matthews Arena; Boston, MA
January 31, 2010; 4:00 pm		at William and Mary	W 61-54	12-11 (7-4)	Kaplan Arena; Williamsburg, VA
February 2, 2010; 7:00 pm, TCN		Towson	W 97-55	13-11 (8-4)	Daskalakis Athletic Center; Philadelphia, PA
February 6, 2010; 4:00 pm		George Mason	W 73-60	14-11 (9-4)	Daskalakis Athletic Center; Philadelphia, PA
February 10, 2010; 7:00 pm		at Hofstra	L 64-75	14-12 (9-5)	Hofstra Arena; Hempstead, NY
February 13, 2010; 12:00 pm		Delaware	W 68-60	15-12 (10-5)	Daskalakis Athletic Center; Philadelphia, PA
February 16, 2010; 7:00 pm, CSN, TCN		at VCU	L 54-73	15-13 (10-6)	Siegel Center; Richmond, VA
February 20, 2010*; 8:00 pm		at Bradley	L 60-76	15-14	Carver Arena; Peoria, Il
February 24, 2010; 7:00 pm, TCN		UNC Wilmington	L 69-75	15-15 (10-7)	Daskalakis Athletic Center; Philadelphia, PA
February 27, 2010; 7:00 pm		at James Madison	W 67-64	16-15 (11-7)	JMU Convocation Center; Harrisonburg, VA
CAA tournament
March 5, 2010; 8:30 pm	(6)	vs. (11) James Madison; CAA tournament First Round	L 65-77	16-16	Richmond Coliseum; Richmond, VA
*Non-conference game. ^{#}Rankings from AP. (#) Tournament seedings in parentheses. All times are in Eastern Time.

== Awards ==
Chris Fouch

- CAA Rookie of the Year
- CAA All-Rookie Team
- CAA Player of the Week
- CAA Rookie of the Week (3)

Samme Givens

- CAA Player of the Week

Jamie Harris

- CAA All-Conference Third Team
- CAA Player of the Week

Derrick Thomas

- CAA Rookie of the Week
