= 2009–10 George Mason Patriots men's basketball team =

American college basketball season

2009–10 George Mason Patriots men's basketball

CIT, First Round
- Conference: Colonial Athletic Association
- Record: 17–15 (12–6 CAA)
- Head coach: Jim Larranaga
- Assistant coaches: Eric Konkol; Chris Caputo; Michael Huger
- Home arena: Patriot Center

2009–10 CAA men's basketball standings
	Conf.				Overall
Team	W		L	PCT	W		L	PCT
Old Dominion †	15	–	3	.833	27	–	9	.750
Northeastern	14	–	4	.778	20	–	13	.606
William & Mary	12	–	6	.667	22	–	11	.667
George Mason	12	–	6	.667	17	–	15	.531
VCU	11	–	7	.611	27	–	9	.750
Drexel	11	–	7	.611	16	–	16	.500
Hofstra	10	–	8	.556	19	–	15	.559
Towson	6	–	12	.333	10	–	21	.323
Georgia State	5	–	13	.278	12	–	20	.375
UNCW	5	–	13	.278	9	–	22	.290
James Madison	4	–	14	.222	13	–	20	.394
Delaware	3	–	15	.167	7	–	24	.226
† 2010 CAA tournament winner Rankings from AP poll

The 2009–10 George Mason Patriots men's basketball team represented George Mason University during the 2009–10 college basketball season. The Patriots, led by head coach Jim Larranaga, are members of the Colonial Athletic Association and played their home games at the Patriot Center. They finished the season 17–15, 12–6 in CAA play and lost in the quarterfinals of the 2010 CAA men's basketball tournament to VCU. They were invited to play in the 2010 CollegeInsider.com Tournament where they lost in the first round to Fairfield.

== Season notes ==
- On January 3, 2010, it was announced that sophomore guard Jimmy Nolan will seek a transfer from the team with hopes of obtaining a scholarship with a Division II school.
- On May 24, 2009, ESPN rated the 2009-10 George Mason men's basketball recruiting class #1 among non-BCS schools

== Awards ==
Second Team All-CAA

- Cam Long

CAA All Rookie Team

- Luke Hancock

CAA Player of the Week

- Cam Long - Jan. 25

CAA Rookie of the Week

- Luke Hancock - Nov. 16
- Luke Hancock - Nov. 23
- Sherrod Wright - Dec. 28
- Kevin Foster - Feb. 22

== Roster ==
2009–10 George Mason Patriots men's basketball team
Players
Coaches

Pos.	#	Name	Height	Weight	Year	Previous school	Hometown
F	1	Paris Bennett	6 ft 6 in (1.98 m)	190 lb (86 kg)	So	St. Patrick's	Elizabeth, NJ
F	33	Louis Birdsong	6 ft 6 in (1.98 m)	230 lb (104 kg)	Sr	Mount Saint Joseph’s	Baltimore, MD
G	45	Andre Cornelius	5 ft 10 in (1.78 m)	172 lb (78 kg)	So	Victory Christian	Charlotte, NC
G	14	Luke Hancock	6 ft 5 in (1.96 m)	175 lb (79 kg)	Fr	Hidden Valley/Hargrave	Roanoke, VA
G	20	Cam Long (C)	6 ft 4 in (1.93 m)	187 lb (85 kg)	Jr	Freedom	Palm Bay, FL
F	22	Mike Morrison	6 ft 9 in (2.06 m)	222 lb (101 kg)	So	Lakewood	St. Petersburg, FL
F	24	Ryan Pearson	6 ft 6 in (1.98 m)	230 lb (104 kg)	So	Christ the King	Far Rockaway, NY
G	13	Isaiah Tate	6 ft 4 in (1.93 m)	214 lb (97 kg)	Jr	DeMatha	Upper Marlboro, MD
G	23	Rashad Whack	6 ft 2 in (1.88 m)	170 lb (77 kg)	Fr	Bishop McNamara	Forestville, MD
F	32	Johnnie Williams	6 ft 8 in (2.03 m)	249 lb (113 kg)	Fr	Briarcrest Christian	Memphis, TN
G	15	Sherrod Wright	6 ft 4 in (1.93 m)	190 lb (86 kg)	Fr	Mount Vernon	Mount Vernon, NY
G	4	Vertrail Vaughns	6 ft 2 in (1.88 m)	185 lb (84 kg)	Fr	Mesquite	Mesquite, TX

Head coach

- Jim Larranaga (Providence)

Assistant coach(es)

- Eric Konkol (Wisconsin-Eau Claire)
- Michael Huger (Bowling Green)
- Chris Caputo (Westfield)

Legend

- (C) Team captain
- (S) Suspended
- (I) Ineligible
- (W) Walk-on
- Injured
- Current redshirt

Roster
Last update: 2010-07-27

== Stats ==
Player	GP	GS	MPG	FG%	3FG%	FT%	RPG	APG	SPG	BPG	PPG
Cam Long	31	31	32.9	.381	.318	.736	3.9	3.1	1.3	.1	12.2
Ryan Pearson	30	28	28.4	.457	.286	.654	6.4	1.2	1.1	.5	11.9
Andre Cornelius	31	29	27.9	.422	.433	.734	2.6	1.6	.8	.0	9.4
Mike Morrison	30	29	24.7	.557	.000	.485	5.9	1.1	.7	1.6	8.5
Luke Hancock	32	5	23.0	.503	.324	.692	3.5	3.0	.8	.3	7.7
Sherrod Wright	31	1	16.1	.466	.262	.710	1.7	.5	.5	.2	5.5
Kevin Foster	26	0	13.3	.465	.330	.605	3.3	.0	.3	.6	4.5
Isaiah Tate	30	23	18.9	.371	.330	.545	2.5	.8	.6	.1	4.4
Johnnie Williams	30	1	9.6	.418	.000	.361	2.1	.2	.3	.3	2.6
Louis Birdsong	30	11	12.9	.408	.360	.667	2.0	.6	.4	.6	2.6
Rashaad Whack	18	1	5.3	.379	.286	.625	.4	.2	.2	.0	1.7
Vertrail Vaughns	6	0	6.7	.200	.250	.667	.3	.3	.0	.0	1.5
Paris Bennett	3	0	4.7	.000	.000	.000	.3	.3	.0	.0	0.0
Jimmy Nolan	1	0	2.0	.000	.000	.000	.0	.0	.0	.0	0.0

== Game log ==
Date time, TV	Rank^{#}	Opponent^{#}	Result	Record	High points	High rebounds	High assists	Site (attendance) city, state
Exhibition
November 5*; 7:00 pm		Virginia State	W 100–82	—	– -	– -	– -	Patriot Center (1,854); Fairfax, VA
Regular season
November 13, 2009*; 7:30 pm		Liberty	W 76–72	1–0	17 – Cornelius	8 – Pearson	5 – Long	Patriot Center (6,014); Fairfax, VA
November 15, 2009*; 4:00 pm		Dartmouth	W 60–44	2–0	19 – Pearson	10 – 2 tied	2 – 3 tied	Patriot Center (6,098); Fairfax, VA
November 19, 2009*; 2:00 pm, ESPNU		vs. No. 6 Villanova; ESPN Puerto Rico Tip-Off	L 68–69	2–1	14 – Pearson	8 – Pearson	2 – Hancock	José Miguel Agrelot Coliseum (5,073); San Juan, Puerto Rico
November 20, 2009*; 1:00 pm, ESPNU		vs. Georgia Tech; ESPN Puerto Rico Tip-Off	L 62–70	2–2	15 – Foster	9 – 2 tied	7 – Hancock	José Miguel Agrelot Coliseum (5,762); San Juan, Puerto Rico
November 22, 2009*; 11:30 pm, ESPNU		vs. Indiana; ESPN Puerto Rico Tip-Off	W 69–66	3–2	18 – Long	13 – Morrison	8 – Hancock	José Miguel Agrelot Coliseum (8,357); San Juan, Puerto Rico
November 28, 2009*; 2:00 pm		at Tulane	L 71–76	3–3	24 – Long	7 – Foster	5 – Long	Avron B. Fogelman Arena (1,527); New Orleans, LA
December 2, 2009*; 7:00 pm, MASN		at George Washington; Rivalry	L 49–66	3–4	15 – Hancock	6 – Morrison	2 – 3 tied	Charles E. Smith Athletic Center (4,125); Washington, D.C.
December 5, 2009; 5:00 pm, MASN		at UNC Wilmington	W 57–52	4–4 (1–0)	14 – Pearson	8 – Pearson	3 – Cornelius	Trask Coliseum (4,374); Wilmington, NC
December 8, 2009*; 7:00 pm, MASN		Dayton	L 55–56	4–5	17 – Wright	6 – Wright	4 – 2 tied	Patriot Center (5,727); Fairfax, VA
December 12, 2009*; 1:00 pm, KMTV		Creighton	W 75–72	5–5	22 – Long	10 – Pearson	2 – Long	Patriot Center (5,502); Fairfax, VA
December 22, 2009*; 7:30 pm		VMI	W 89–86	6–5	24 – Wright	13 – Pearson	3 – 4 tied	Patriot Center (5,420); Fairfax, VA
December 30, 2009*; 7:00 pm, MASN		at Radford	L 53–80	6–6	10 – Hancock	6 – 2 tied	3 – 2 tied	Dedmon Center (1,564); Radford, VA
January 2, 2010; 12:00 pm, CSN		Old Dominion	W 71–55	7–6 (2–0)	17 – Pearson	8 – 2 tied	4 – Long	Patriot Center (8,629); Fairfax, VA
January 4, 2010; 7:00 pm, FiOS1		Hofstra	W 67–63	8–6 (3–0)	17 – Pearson	7 – Hancock	4 – Long	Patriot Center (3,826); Fairfax, VA
January 7, 2010; 7:00 pm, TCN		at Northeastern	L 46–71	8–7 (3–1)	20 – Pearson	10 – Pearson	5 – Long	Matthews Arena (1,148); Boston, MA
January 9, 2010; 4:00 pm, MASN		UNC Wilmington	W 59–46	9–7 (4–1)	15 – Morrison	6 – 2 tied	4 – Pearson	Patriot Center (5,705); Fairfax, VA
January 13, 2010; 7:00 pm		Georgia State	W 52–49	10–7 (5–1)	14 – 2 tied	5 – Pearson	5 – Long	Patriot Center (3,826); Fairfax, VA
January 16, 2010; 2:00 pm, CSN		at James Madison	W 82–71	11–7 (6–1)	24 – Long	6 – Pearson	4 – 3 tied	JMU Convocation Center (5,424); Harrisonburg, VA
January 19, 2010; 7:00 pm, ESPNU		at Hofstra	W 90-72	12–7 (7–1)	27 – Long	9 – Pearson	7 – Long	Mack Sports Complex (2,573); Hempstead, NY
January 23, 2010; 4:00 pm, MASN		at Towson	W 80–71	13–7 (8–1)	21 – Long	12 – Morrison	4 – Pearson	Towson Center (1,988); Towson, MD
January 27, 2010; 7:00 pm		Delaware	W 77–66	14–7 (9–1)	18 – Long	8 – Birdsong	3 – 2 tied	Patriot Center (4,435); Fairfax, VA
January 30, 2010; 12:00 pm, CSN		James Madison	W 70–68	15–7 (10–1)	23 – Long	8 – Pearson	4 – Hancock	Patriot Center (7,813); Fairfax, VA
February 3, 2010; 7:00 pm		at Georgia State	L 57–61	15–8 (10–2)	13 – Pearson	8 – Pearson	3 – 3 tied	GSU Sports Arena (1,341); Atlanta, GA
February 6, 2010; 4:00 pm		at Drexel	L 60–73	15–9 (10–3)	17 – 2 tied	9 – Pearson	4 – Long	Daskalakis Athletic Center (863); Philadelphia, PA
February 9, 2010; 7:00 pm, ESPNU		VCU	W 82–77 ^{OT}	16–9 (11–3)	19 – Long	10 – Morrison	5 – 2 tied	Patriot Center (5,486); Fairfax, VA
February 13, 2010; 4:00 pm, CSN		at Old Dominion	L 60–76	16–10 (11–4)	13 – Cornelius	6 – Long	3 – Hancock	Ted Constant Convocation Center (8,424); Norfolk, VA
February 16, 2010; 7:00 pm, MASN		William & Mary	L 60–63	16–11 (11–5)	22 – Foster	9 – Foster	7 – Hancock	Patriot Center (5,539); Fairfax, VA
February 20, 2010*; 8:00 pm, ESPNU		College of Charleston; ESPN BracketBusters	L 83–85	16–12	18 – Williams	10 – Foster	6 – Long	Patriot Center (8,370); Fairfax, VA
February 24, 2010; 7:00 pm		at Delaware	W 61–59	17–12 (12–5)	16 – Cornelius	9 – Long	4 – 2 tied	Bob Carpenter Center (2,174); Newark, DE
February 27, 2010; 12:00 pm, ESPN2		Northeastern	L 48–50	17–13 (12–6)	13 – Wright	12 – Morrison	5 – Hancock	Patriot Center (8,940); Fairfax, VA
CAA tournament
March 6, 2010; 2:30 pm, Comcast	(4)	vs. (5) VCU; CAA Quarterfinals	L 60–75	17–14	22 – Pearson	7 – Pearson	2 – 2 tied	Richmond Coliseum (8,908); Richmond, VA
CollegeInsider.com tournament
March 16, 2010; 7:00 pm		Fairfield; CIT First Round	L 96–101 ^{OT}	17–15	28 – Cornelius	9 – 3 tied	11 – Hancock	Patriot Center (2,062); Fairfax, VA
*Non-conference game. ^{#}Rankings from AP Poll. (#) Tournament seedings in parentheses. All times are in Eastern Time.

== Recruiting ==
The following is a list of players signed for the 2010-11 season:

College recruiting information
Name	Hometown	School	Height	Weight	Commit date
Bryon Allen; PG	Largo, MD	St. Thomas More School	6 ft 3 in (1.91 m)	205 lb (93 kg)	Mar 29, 2010
Bryon Allen; PG	Recruit ratings: Scout: Rivals: (90)				
Jonathan Arledge; PF	Washington, DC	KIMA School	6 ft 9 in (2.06 m)	220 lb (100 kg)	Sep 24, 2009
Jonathan Arledge; PF	Recruit ratings: Scout: Rivals: (88)				
Overall recruit ranking:
Note: In many cases, Scout, Rivals, 247Sports, On3, and ESPN may conflict in their listings of height and weight.; In these cases, the average was taken. ESPN grades are on a 100-point scale.; Sources: "ESPN". ESPN.; "2010 Team Ranking". Rivals.
