= 2009–10 Dayton Flyers men's basketball team =

American college basketball season

2009–10 Dayton Flyers men's basketball
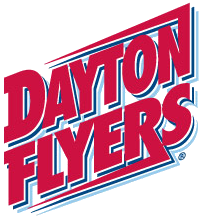

NIT Champions
- Conference: Atlantic 10 Conference
- Record: 25–12 (8–8 A-10)
- Head coach: Brian Gregory (7th season)
- Assistant coaches: Billy Schmidt; Cornell Mann; Jon Borovich
- Home arena: University of Dayton Arena

2009–10 Atlantic 10 men's basketball standings
	Conf.				Overall
Team	W		L	PCT	W		L	PCT
No. 12 Temple†	14	–	2	.875	29	–	6	.829
No. 25 Xavier	14	–	2	.875	26	–	9	.743
No. 24 Richmond	13	–	3	.813	26	–	9	.743
Saint Louis	11	–	5	.688	23	–	13	.639
Rhode Island	9	–	7	.563	26	–	10	.722
Charlotte	9	–	7	.563	19	–	12	.613
Dayton	8	–	8	.500	25	–	12	.676
St. Bonaventure	7	–	9	.438	15	–	16	.484
Duquesne	7	–	9	.438	16	–	16	.500
George Washington	6	–	10	.375	16	–	15	.516
UMass	5	–	11	.313	12	–	20	.375
Saint Joseph's	5	–	11	.313	11	–	20	.355
La Salle	4	–	12	.250	12	–	18	.400
Fordham	0	–	16	.000	2	–	26	.071
† 2010 Atlantic 10 Tournament winner Rankings from AP Poll

The 2009–10 Dayton Flyers men's basketball team represented the University of Dayton in the 2009–10 college basketball season. This was head coach Brian Gregory's seventh season at Dayton. The Flyers compete in the Atlantic 10 Conference and played their home games at the University of Dayton Arena. They finished the season 25–12, 8–8 in A-10 play and lost in the quarterfinals of the 2010 Atlantic 10 men's basketball tournament. They were invited to and were champions of the 2010 National Invitation Tournament.

== Roster ==
#	Name	Height	Weight (lbs.)	Position	Class	Hometown	Previous Team(s)
0	Mickey Perry	6'2"	197	G	Sr.	Maywood, Illinois	Proviso East HS
1	London Warren	6'0"	187	G	Sr.	Jacksonville, Florida	Raines HS
3	Rob Lowery	6'3"	172	G	Sr.	Forestville, Maryland	McDonough HS
4	Chris Johnson	6'6"	191	F	So.	Columbus, Ohio	Brookhaven HS
12	Dan Fox	6'4"	194	F	Sr.	Wolcottville, Indiana	Lakeland HS
22	Paul Williams	6'4"	206	G	So.	Detroit, Michigan	Renaissance HS
23	Luke Fabrizius	6'9"	227	F	So.	Arlington Heights, Illinois	John Hersey HS
24	Luke Hendrick	6'4"	170	F	Sr.	Saginaw, Michigan	Nouvel Catholic Central HS
25	Logan Nourse	6'1"	176	G	Jr.	Spencerville, Ohio	Spencerville HS
32	Marcus Johnson	6'3"	200	G	Sr.	Cleveland, Ohio	St. Vincent – St. Mary HS
33	Chris Wright	6'8"	226	F	Jr.	Trotwood, Ohio	Trotwood-Madison HS
34	Devin Searcy	6'10"	226	F/C	Jr.	Romulus, Michigan	Romulus HS
35	Matt Kavanaugh	6'9"	250	F/C	Fr.	Centerville, Ohio	Centerville HS
40	Peter Zestermann	6'8"	219	F/C	Jr.	Cincinnati, Ohio	St. Xavier HS
41	Kurt Huelsman	6'10"	245	F/C	Sr.	St. Henry, Ohio	St. Henry HS
44	Josh Benson	6'9"	215	F/C	Fr.	Dayton, Ohio	Dunbar HS

== Schedule and results ==
Date time, TV	Rank^{#}	Opponent^{#}	Result	Record	Site (attendance) city, state
Exhibition
11/3/2009*; 7:00pm	No. 21	Ferris State	W 62–51	—	UD Arena; Dayton, Ohio
11/9/2009*; 7:00pm	No. 21	Northern Kentucky	W 71–61	—	UD Arena; Dayton, Ohio
Regular Season
11/14/2009*; 1:00pm, WHIO	No. 21	Creighton	W 90–80	1–0	UD Arena (13,435); Dayton, Ohio
11/19/2009*; 11:30am, ESPN Plus	No. 18	vs. No. 21 Georgia Tech; Puerto Rico Tip-Off	W 63–59	2–0	José Miguel Agrelot Coliseum (5,073); San Juan, PR
11/20/2009*; 3:30pm, ESPNU	No. 18	vs. No. 5 Villanova; Puerto Rico Tip-Off	L 65–71	2–1	José Miguel Agrelot Coliseum (5,762); San Juan, PR
11/22/2009*; 5:30pm, ESPNU	No. 18	vs. Kansas State; Puerto Rico Tip-Off	L 75–83	2–2	José Miguel Agrelot Coliseum (8,357); San Juan, PR
11/28/2009*; 2:00pm		Towson	W 74–69	3–2	UD Arena (12,730); Dayton, Ohio
12/2/2009*; 7:05pm, WHIO		at Miami (OH)	W 65–58	4–2	Millett Hall (4,820); Oxford, Ohio
12/5/2009*; 2:00pm		Lehigh	W 89–71	5–2	UD Arena (12,719); Dayton, Ohio
12/8/2009*; 7:00pm, WHIO		at George Mason	W 56–55	6–2	Patriot Center (5,727); Fairfax, Virginia
December 11, 2009*; 7:00pm, WHIO		Old Dominion	W 58–50	7–2	UD Arena (13,159); Dayton, Ohio
12/19/2009*; 8:00pm		Presbyterian	W 71–52	8–2	UD Arena (12,269); Dayton, Ohio
12/21/2009*; 8:00pm		Appalachian State	W 65–49	9–2	UD Arena (13,435); Dayton, Ohio
12/29/2009*; 7:00pm		Boston University	W 74–60	10–2	UD Arena (13,435); Dayton, Ohio
1/1/2010*; 9:00pm, CBSCS		at No. 19 New Mexico	L 66–68	10–3	The Pit (14,586); Albuquerque, New Mexico
1/5/2010*; 8:00pm		at Ball State	W 59–35	11–3	UD Arena (13,167); Dayton, Ohio
1/9/2010; 2:00pm, CBSCS		Duquesne	W 78–72	12–3 (1–0)	UD Arena (13,435); Dayton, Ohio
1/13/2010; 9:30pm, WHIO		at Fordham	W 74–58	13–3 (2–0)	Madison Square Garden (7,040); New York City
1/16/2010; 11:00am, ESPN2		at Xavier	L 75–78	13–4 (2–1)	Cintas Center (10,250); Cincinnati, Ohio
1/20/2010; 7:00pm		George Washington	W 66–51	14–4 (3–1)	UD Arena (12,630); Dayton, Ohio
1/23/2010; 6:00pm, ESPNU		at Saint Joseph's	L 59–60	14–5 (3–2)	Hagan Arena (4,200); Philadelphia, Pennsylvania
1/26/2010; 7:00pm, WHIO		Rhode Island	L 64–65	14–6 (3–3)	UD Arena (12,501); Dayton, Ohio
1/30/2010; 7:00pm		at St. Bonaventure	W 75–58	15–6 (4–3)	Reilly Center (5,290); St. Bonaventure, New York
2/6/2010; 11:00am, ESPN2		Xavier	W 90–65	16–6 (5–3)	UD Arena (13,435); Dayton, Ohio
February 10, 2010; 7:00pm		Charlotte	W 75–47	17–6 (6–3)	UD Arena (12,716); Dayton, Ohio
2/13/2010; 4:00pm, ESPNU		at Saint Louis	L 65–68 ^{2OT}	17–7 (6–4)	Chaifetz Arena (9,453); St. Louis, Missouri
2/18/2010; 7:00pm, CBSCS		La Salle	W 68–54	18–7 (7–4)	UD Arena (12,664); Dayton, Ohio
2/21/2010; 1:00pm, ESPN2		at Duquesne	L 71–73	18–8 (7–5)	A. J. Palumbo Center (5,144); Pittsburgh, Pennsylvania
2/24/2010; 6:30pm, CBSCS		at No. 20 Temple	L 41–49	18–9 (7–6)	Liacouras Center (5,833); Philadelphia, Pennsylvania
2/27/2010; 7:00pm, CBSCS		UMass	W 96–68	19–9 (8–6)	UD Arena (13,435); Dayton, Ohio
3/4/2010; 7:00pm, CBSCS		at Richmond	L 56–60	19–10 (8–7)	Robins Center (7,121); Richmond, Virginia
3/6/2010; 7:00pm, CBSCS		Saint Louis	L 66–71	19–11 (8–8)	UD Arena (13,435); Dayton, Ohio
Atlantic 10 tournament
3/9/2010; 7:00pm	(7)	(10) George Washington; A-10 First Round	W 70–60	20–11	UD Arena (6,930); Dayton, Ohio
March 12, 2010; 6:30pm, CBSCS	(7)	vs. (2) No. 24 Xavier; A-10 Quarterfinals	L 73–78	20–12	Boardwalk Hall; Atlantic City, New Jersey
NIT
3/17/2010; 7:00pm	(3 I)	(6 I) Illinois State; NIT First Round	W 63–42	21–12	UD Arena (5,127); Dayton, Ohio
3/22/2010; 9:00pm, ESPN	(3 I)	at (2 I) Cincinnati; NIT Second Round	W 81–66	22–12	Fifth Third Arena (6,479); Cincinnati, Ohio
3/24/2010; 9:00pm, ESPN2	(3 I)	at (1 I) Illinois; NIT Quarterfinals	W 77–71	23–12	Assembly Hall (8,548); Champaign, Illinois
3/30/2010; 7:00pm, ESPN2	(3 I)	vs. (2 AS) Ole Miss; NIT Semifinals	W 68–63	24–12	Madison Square Garden (11,689); New York City
4/1/2010; 7:00pm, ESPN	(3 I)	vs. (4 MS) North Carolina; NIT Championship Game	W 79–68	25–12	Madison Square Garden (9,827); New York
*Non-conference game. ^{#}Rankings from AP Poll. (#) Tournament seedings in parentheses. AS=NIT Arizona State bracket. I=NIT Illinois bracket. MS=NIT Mississippi State bracket. All times are in Eastern Time. Source
