= Gerald Lee (basketball) =

Finnish basketball player (born 1987)

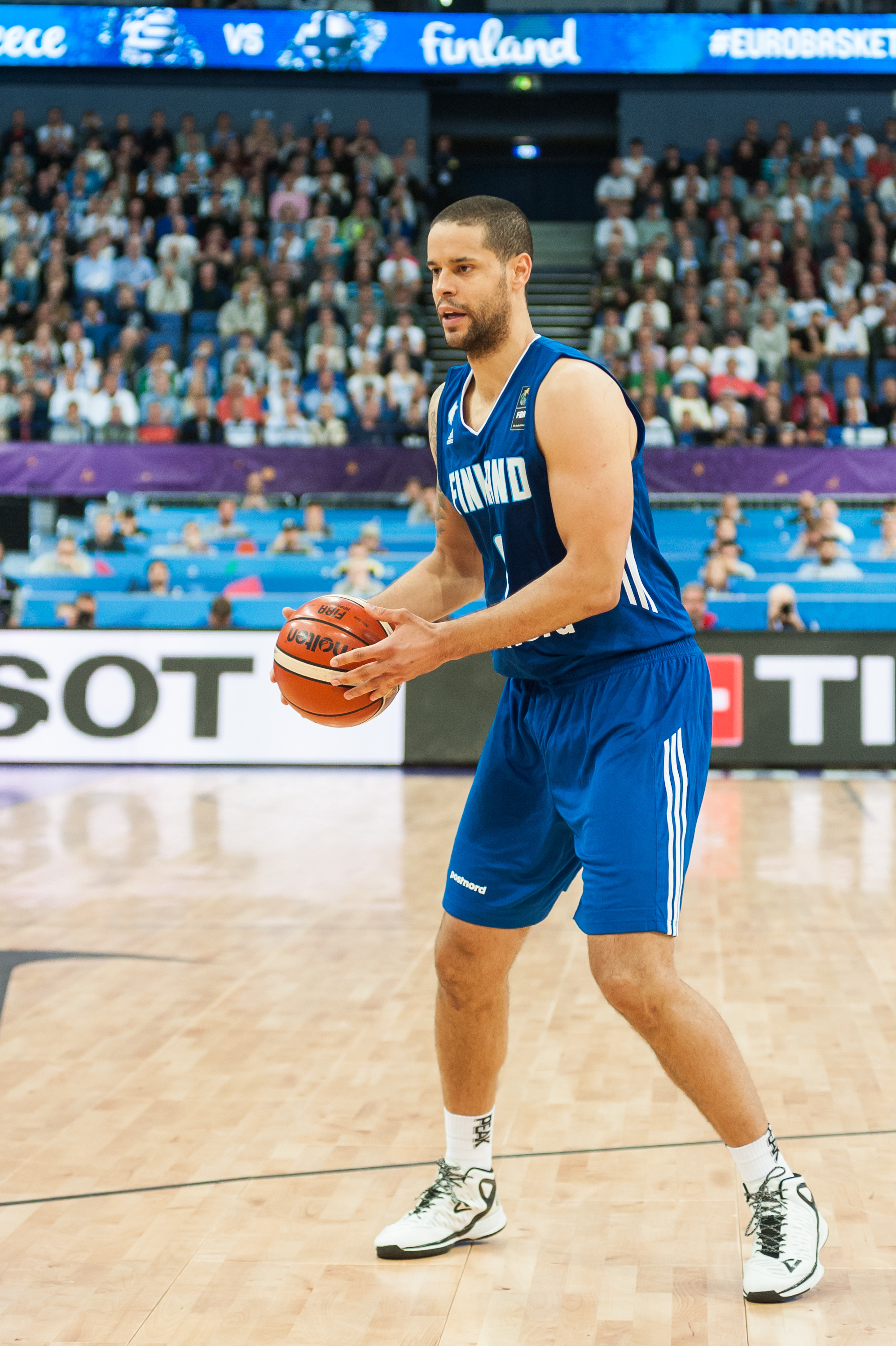
- Lee with Finland during EuroBasket 2017

Free agent
- Position: Center

Personal information
- Born: November 23, 1987 (age 38) Uusikaupunki, Finland
- Listed height: 6 ft 10 in (2.08 m)
- Listed weight: 250 lb (113 kg)

Career information
- College: Old Dominion (2006–2010)
- NBA draft: 2010: undrafted
- Playing career: 2004–present

Career history
- 2004–2006: UU-Korihait
- 2010–2011: Snaidero Udine
- 2011–2012: Prima Veroli
- 2012–2013: Budućnost Podgorica
- 2013–2015: CSU Asesoft Ploiești
- 2015: Murcia
- 2015–2016: Steaua București
- 2016: Le Mans Sarthe
- 2016–2017: Helsinki Seagulls
- 2017–2018: Maccabi Ashdod
- 2018–2019: Ironi Nes Ziona

Career highlights
- Montenegrin League champion (2013); 2× First-team All-CAA (2009, 2010); CAA tournament MVP (2010)

Gerald Raymond Lee Jr. (born November 23, 1987) is a Finnish professional basketball player who last played for Ironi Nes Ziona of the Israeli Premier League. He played college basketball for Old Dominion University.

== Basketball career ==
Lee began his professional career in 2004 with UU-Korihait of the Finnish Korisliiga, and played with them for two seasons.

From 2006 to 2010, he played college basketball at the Old Dominion University, with the Old Dominion Monarchs.

From 2010 to 2012 he played in the Italian Legadue Basket, first with Snaidero Udine and then with Prima Veroli.

In August 2012, he signed a two-year contract with Budućnost Podgorica of Montenegro. He left Budućnost after one season.

In September 2013, he signed a one-year deal with the Romanian team CSU Asesoft Ploiești. In July 2014, he extended his contract with Asesoft for one more season. On February 2, 2015, he left Asesoft Ploiești and signed with UCAM Murcia of Spain for the rest of the 2014–15 ACB season.

On September 16, 2015, he signed a one-year deal with Steaua București of Romania.

On September 13, 2016, Lee signed with French club Le Mans Sarthe Basket. He left Le Mans after appearing in only three games, and on October 13, 2016, he signed with Helsinki Seagulls for the rest of the season.

On August 2, 2017, Lee signed with Israeli club Maccabi Ashdod for the 2017–18 season. Lee helped Ashdod to reach the 2018 Israeli League Playoffs, where they eventually lost to Hapoel Tel Aviv. In 28 games played during the 2017–18 season, Lee averaged 11.2 points and 4.9 rebounds per game, shooting 58.9 percent from the field. Gerald Lee has birthed one son by the name of Hudson Thomas Lee.

On July 6, 2018, Lee signed a one-year deal with Ironi Nes Ziona. On January 8, 2019, Lee parted ways with Nes Ziona after appearing in 22 games.

== Career statistics ==
Legend
GP	Games played	GS	Games started	MPG	Minutes per game
FG%	Field goal percentage	3P%	3-point field goal percentage	FT%	Free throw percentage
RPG	Rebounds per game	APG	Assists per game	SPG	Steals per game
BPG	Blocks per game	PPG	Points per game	**Bold**	Career high

=== National team ===
Team	Tournament	Pos.	GP	PPG	RPG	APG
Finland	EuroBasket 2011	9th	8	9.6	2.9	1.3
Finland	EuroBasket 2013	9th	8	8.3	4.3	0.5
Finland	2014 FIBA World Cup	22nd	5	7.2	3.2	0.6
Finland	EuroBasket 2015	16th	6	6.0	4.5	1.0
Finland	EuroBasket 2017	11th	4	4.0	3.8	0.7

=== EuroCup ===
Year	Team	GP	GS	MPG	FG%	3P%	FT%	RPG	APG	SPG	BPG	PPG	PIR
2012–13	Budućnost	**14**	**14**	21.3	.533	–	**.692**	3.4	.8	.6	.1	8.8	7.1
2013–14	Ploiești	10	2	**27.9**	**.717**	–	.657	**7.3**	**1.3**	**.7**	**.6**	**15.5**	**19.6**
2014–15	Ploiești	**14**	13	24.0	.638	–	.517	3.9	**1.3**	.6	.4	13.7	12.4
2015–16	Steaua București	6	5	20.5	.549	–	.632	4.0	.5	.3	.0	11.3	8.8
Career		44	34	23.5	.619	–	0.609	4.5	1.0	.6	.3	12.2	11.9

== National team career ==
Lee is a member of the Finland national basketball team. He played for them at the FIBA EuroBasket 2011, FIBA EuroBasket 2013, EuroBasket 2015, EuroBasket 2017, and 2014 FIBA Basketball World Cup.

== Personal life ==
Lee was born in Finland to a Finnish mother and an African-American father. He is a dual citizen of Finland and the United States. His father Gerald Lee Sr. played basketball in Finland from 1973 to 1997, and he also played eight matches for Finland national team in 1992.

Lee has a daughter with his wife Ida. Ida's sister is Finnish high jumper Tilda Huff (née Hämäläinen), who was married to Finnish basketball player Shawn Huff.
