= Matt Janning =

American-Georgian basketball player (born 1988)

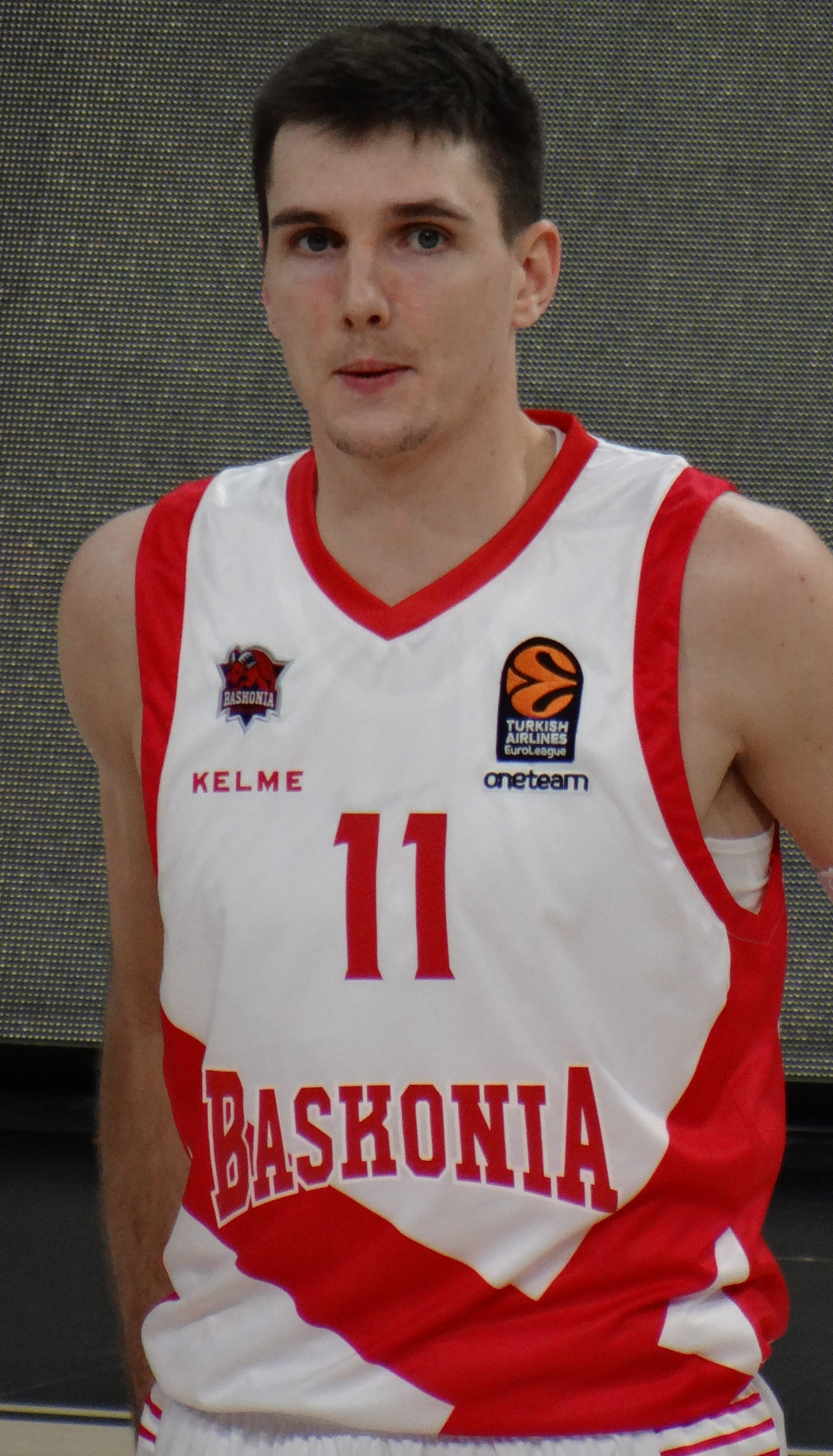
- Janning with Saski Baskonia in 2017

Northeastern Huskies
- Title: Assistant coach
- League: Coastal Athletic Association

Personal information
- Born: June 22, 1988 (age 38) Watertown, Minnesota
- Listed height: 6 ft 5 in (1.96 m)
- Listed weight: 195 lb (88 kg)

Career information
- High school: Watertown-Mayer (Watertown, Minnesota)
- College: Northeastern (2006–2010)
- NBA draft: 2010: undrafted
- Playing career: 2010–2023
- Position: Shooting guard
- Coaching career: 2024–present

Career history

Playing
- 2010–2011: Maine Red Claws
- 2011: Rio Grande Valley Vipers
- 2011–2012: Casale Monferrato
- 2012–2013: Montepaschi Siena
- 2013: Cibona
- 2014: Montepaschi Siena
- 2014–2015: Anadolu Efes
- 2015–2016: Hapoel Jerusalem
- 2016–2017: Lokomotiv Kuban
- 2017–2020: Saski Baskonia
- 2020–2021: Manresa
- 2021–2023: Kawasaki Brave Thunders

Coaching
- 2024–present: Northeastern (assistant)

Career highlights
- Italian League champion (2013); Italian Cup winner (2013); Turkish Cup winner (2015); Spanish League champion (2020); Japan Cup champion (2022)
- Stats at Basketball Reference

Matthew Lawrence Janning (born June 22, 1988) is a former American-born naturalized Georgian professional basketball player and assistant coach. He is a 6 ft 5 in (1.96 m) tall shooting guard that played college basketball for Northeastern University.

== High school career ==
A combo guard, Janning attended Watertown-Mayer High School, where he averaged a Metro-high 31.8 points per game and 8.4 rebounds, earning All-Conference honors three times, a two-time All-Area award and was a two-time team MVP. In October of 2021, Janning was inducted into the Watertown-Mayer High School Athletics Hall of Fame alongside his younger sister, Marissa.

== College career ==
After high school, Janning played college basketball with the Northeastern University Huskies. He was proclaimed as one of Northeastern University's most prolific scorers of the program after ending as the program's fourth-leading scorer of all time with 1,836 points. He was a three-time All-CAA performer, including first-team honors in 2009 and 2010. On November 7th, 2024, Janning was inducted into the Northeastern University Athletics Hall of Fame.

== Professional career ==
After going undrafted in the 2010 NBA draft, Janning played with the Boston Celtics in the Orlando Summer League and later for the Phoenix Suns in the Las Vegas Summer League. On August 4, 2010, he signed a multi-year contract with the Phoenix Suns. On November 16, he was released by the Phoenix Suns before appearing in a game for them.

On December 1, he was signed by the Maine Red Claws, after they released Jordan Eglseder, due to injury. On January 20, he was traded to the Rio Grande Valley Vipers, in exchange for Antonio Anderson. He led the Vipers to the NBDL Finals, averaging 11 points per game.

On July 16, 2011, he signed a 1-year contract for $120,000 with Novipiù Casale Monferrato of the Lega Basket Serie A. In his first Italian League season, he averaged 12.6 points, 3.6 rebounds, and 1.7 assists per game, while shooting 41% from 2-point range, 38% from 3-point range, and 70% from the free throw stripe. Janning then played with the Indiana Pacers in the Orlando Summer League, and later for the Memphis Grizzlies, in the Las Vegas Summer League, during the 2012 summer.

Janning then signed with the reigning Italian League champions, Montepaschi Siena, in August 2012. He made the Lega Basket Serie A BEKO All-Star team. In his 2nd Italian League season he is averaging 7.1 points, 2.3 rebounds, and 1.0 assists per game, while shooting 48% from 2-point range, 31% from 3-point range, and 87% from the free throw stripe.

On August 4, 2013, it was announced that Janning signed for Croatian champions Cibona Zagreb. He was released in December 2013, due to financial problems of the club. On January 3, 2014, he signed with his former club Montepaschi Siena for the rest of the season.

On July 10, 2014, he signed a 1+1 contract with the Turkish team Anadolu Efes.

On September 28, 2015, Janning signed with the Denver Nuggets. However, he was later waived by the Nuggets on October 15 in order for him to sign with Hapoel Jerusalem of the Israeli Basketball Premier League. On February 7, 2016, he parted ways with Hapoel Jerusalem. Two days later, he signed a deal with Lokomotiv Kuban until the end of the 2016–17 season.

On September 15, 2017, Janning signed a two-month deal with Baskonia of the Liga ACB and the EuroLeague to replace the injured Jordan McRae. He finally extended his contract for the whole season on November 17.

On July 6, 2018, Janning re-signed on a 2 + 1 deal with Baskonia. On July 7, 2020, Janning was officially released from the Spanish club.

On December 23, 2020, he signed with Baxi Manresa of the Liga ACB.

On June 30, 2021, Janning with Kawasaki Brave Thunders of the B.League for the 2021–22 season. Janning helped lead the Brave Thunders to the JBA Emperor's Cup Title in his first season, earning a spot on the "Best Five" awards list for the tournament. Janning would spend 2 seasons with the Brave Thunders before retiring from his playing career in 2023.

== Coaching career ==
On July 30, 2024, it was announced that Janning would be hired as an assistant coach at his alma mater, Northeastern.

== Georgia national team ==
On September 4, 2018, Janning got a Georgian passport, becoming a member of the Georgia national basketball team for the 2019 FIBA Basketball World Cup qualification games.

On September 13, 2018, he made his first appearance for the Georgian team in an 85–80 win over Israel, recording 15 points, three rebounds and three assists.

== Career statistics ==
Legend
GP	Games played	GS	Games started	MPG	Minutes per game
FG%	Field-goal percentage	3P%	3-point field-goal percentage	FT%	Free-throw percentage
RPG	Rebounds per game	APG	Assists per game	SPG	Steals per game
BPG	Blocks per game	PPG	Points per game	PIR	Performance index rating
**Bold**	Career high

=== EuroLeague ===
*	Led the league

Year	Team	GP	GS	MPG	FG%	3P%	FT%	RPG	APG	SPG	BPG	PPG	PIR
2012–13	Mens Sana	21	14	19.7	**.464**	**.476**	.643	1.7	1.6	.6	**.1**	8.4	6.9
2014–15	Anadolu Efes	27	**22**	21.6	.384	.336	.650	1.9	1.4	.7	.0	6.9	4.5
2015–16	Lokomotiv Kuban	14	0	21.9	.443	.393	**1.000**	1.8	1.4	.4	**.1**	8.6	5.6
2017–18	Baskonia	**34**	15	22.4	.431	.388	.905	1.7	1.5	.6	**.1**	8.3	7.0
2018–19	Baskonia	28	17	**24.9**	.413	.377	.795	**2.1**	**1.8**	**.8**	**.1**	**10.1**	**8.4**
2019–20	Baskonia	28*	13	22.7	.303	.285	.909	2.0	1.5	.8	.0	6.0	3.9
Career		152	81	22.4	.402	.370	.810	1.9	1.6	.7	.1	8.0	6.1

=== College ===
Year	Team	GP	GS	MPG	FG%	3P%	FT%	RPG	APG	SPG	BPG	PPG
2006–07	Northeastern	32	31	35.4	.414	.353	.724	4.5	2.8	0.9	0.2	11.6
2007–08	Northeastern	31	31	**36.3**	**.447**	**.376**	**.812**	3.5	2.4	1.3	0.2	**16.1**
2008–09	Northeastern	32	32	36.0	.406	.323	.742	**4.7**	2.7	**1.5**	0.2	14.3
2009–10	Northeastern	**33**	**33**	36.1	.412	.329	.752	4.0	**3.1**	**1.5**	0.2	15.4
Career		128	127	35.9	.419	.345	.757	4.2	2.8	1.3	0.2	14.3
