= 2009–10 NCAA Division I men's basketball rankings =

- Season: 2009–10
- NCAA Tournament: 2010
- Preseason No. 1: Kansas
- NCAA Tournament Champions: Duke
NCAA Division I men's basketball rankings


Two human polls made up the 2009–10 NCAA Division I men's basketball rankings, the AP Poll and the Coaches Poll, in addition to various publications' preseason polls.

== Legend ==
	Increase in ranking
	Decrease in ranking
	Not ranked previous week
Italics	Number of first place votes
(#-#)	Win–loss record
т	Tied with team above or below also with this symbol

== AP poll ==
The Associated Press (AP) preseason poll was released on November 2, 2009. This poll is compiled by sportswriters across the nation. In Division I men's and women's college basketball, the AP Poll is largely just a tool to compare schools throughout the season and spark debate, as it has no bearing on postseason play. Generally, all top 25 teams in the poll are invited to the NCAA basketball tournament, also known as March Madness.

	Preseason Nov 2	Week 1 Nov 16	Week 2 Nov 23	Week 3 Nov 30	Week 4 Dec 7	Week 5 Dec 14	Week 6 Dec 21	Week 7 Dec 28	Week 8 Jan 4	Week 9 Jan 11	Week 10 Jan 18	Week 11 Jan 25	Week 12 Feb 1	Week 13 Feb 8	Week 14 Feb 15	Week 15 Feb 22	Week 16 Mar 1	Week 17 Mar 8	Week 18 Mar 15	
1.	Kansas 55	Kansas (1–0) 58	Kansas (3–0) 56	Kansas (5–0) 63	Kansas (7–0) 62	Kansas (9–0) 61	Kansas (10–0) 55	Kansas (11–0) 52	Kansas (13–0) 56	Texas (15–0) 56	Texas (17–0) 57	Kentucky (19–0) 65	Kansas (20–1) 54	Kansas (22–1) 55	Kansas (24–1) 62	Kansas (26–1) 61	Syracuse (27–2) 59	Kansas (29–2) 63	Kansas (32–2) 65	1.
2.	Michigan State 5	Michigan St (1–0) 5	Michigan St (4–0) 7	Texas (5–0) 1	Texas (6–0) 1	Texas (8–0) 1	Texas (10–0) 7	Texas (11–0) 11	Texas (14–0) 8	Kentucky (16–0) 9	Kentucky (18–0) 8	Kansas (18–1)	Villanova (19–1) 4	Syracuse (23–1) 8	Kentucky (24–1) 3	Kentucky (26–1) 4	Kansas (27–2) 6	Kentucky (29–2) 2	Kentucky (32–2)	2.
3.	Texas 1	Texas (1–0) 1	Texas (2–0) 1	Villanova (6–0)	Villanova (8–0) 1	Kentucky (10–0)	Kentucky (11–0) 1	Kentucky (13–0) 1	Kentucky (15–0) 1	Kansas (14–1)	Kansas (16–1)	Villanova (18–1)	Syracuse (21–1) 6	Kentucky (22–1) 2	Villanova (22–3)	Purdue (23–3)	Kentucky (27–2)	Syracuse (28–3)	Duke (29–5)	3.
4.	Kentucky 3	Kentucky (1–0) 1	Villanova (5–0)	Purdue (6–0)	Kentucky (8–0)	Purdue (9–0)	Purdue (10–0)	Purdue (11–0)	Purdue (14–0)	Villanova (14–1)	Villanova (16–1)	Syracuse (19–1)	Kentucky (20–1) 1	Villanova (20–2)	Purdue (21–3)	Syracuse (25–2)	Duke (25–4)	Duke (26–5)	Syracuse (28–4)	4.
5.	Villanova	Villanova (1–0)	Kentucky (4–0)	Kentucky (7–0)	Purdue (7–0)	Syracuse (10–0) 2	Syracuse (11–0) 2	Syracuse (12–0)	Duke (12–1)	Syracuse (15–1)	Syracuse (17–1)	Michigan State (17–3)	Michigan State (19–3)	West Virginia (19–3)	Syracuse (24–2)	Duke (23–4)	Kansas State (24–4)	Ohio State (24–7)	Ohio State (27–7)	5.
6.	North Carolina 1	North Carolina (3–0)	Purdue (3–0)	Duke (6–0)	West Virginia (5–0)	West Virginia (7–0)	West Virginia (8–0)	West Virginia (10–0)	Villanova (12–1)	Purdue (14–1)	Michigan State (15–3)	Texas (17–2)	West Virginia (17–3)	Purdue (19–3)	Duke (21–4)	Kansas State (22–4)	Ohio State (23–7)	Purdue (26–4)	West Virginia (27–6)	6.
7.	Purdue	Purdue (1–0)	Duke (4–0)	West Virginia (5–0)	Syracuse (8–0) 1	Duke (7–1)	Duke (9–1)	Duke (9–1)	Syracuse (13–1)	Michigan State (13–3)	Duke (15–2)	Georgetown (15–3)	Georgetown (16–4)	Georgetown (17–5)	Kansas State (20–4)	Villanova (22–4)	Purdue (24–4)	West Virginia (24–6)	Kansas State (26–7)	7.
8.	West Virginia	West Virginia (1–0)	West Virginia (1–0)	Syracuse (7–0) 1	Duke (7–1)	Villanova (9–1)	Villanova (10–1)	Villanova (11–1)	West Virginia (11–1)	Duke (13–2)	Tennessee (14–2)	Duke (16–3)	Purdue (18–3)	Duke (19–4)	West Virginia (19–5)	West Virginia (21–5)	New Mexico (27–3)	New Mexico (28–3)	New Mexico (29–4)	8.
9.	Duke	Duke (1–0)	Tennessee (4–0)	Michigan St (5–2)	Tennessee (6–1)	Tennessee (7–1)	Michigan State (9–2)	North Carolina (9–3)	North Carolina (11–4)	Tennessee (12–2)	Pittsburgh (15–2)	West Virginia (15–3)	Texas (18–3)	Kansas State (19–4)	Ohio State (20–6)	Ohio State (21–7)	Villanova (23–5)	Kansas State (24–6)	Villanova (24–7)	9.
10.	Tennessee	Tennessee (1–0)	Syracuse (4–0) 1	North Carolina (7–1)	Florida (8–0)	North Carolina (8–2)	North Carolina (8–3)	Connecticut (9–2)	Michigan State (11–3)	West Virginia (12–2)	Kansas State (15–2)	Purdue (16–3)	Duke (17–4) т	Michigan State (19–5)	Georgetown (18–6)	New Mexico (25–3)	West Virginia (22–6)	Villanova (24–6)	Purdue (27–5)	10.
11.	Butler	Butler (1–0)	North Carolina (4–1)	Tennessee (5–1)	North Carolina (7–2)	Georgetown (8–0)	Connecticut (7–2)	Michigan State (9–3)	Kansas State (13–1)	Georgetown (12–2)	West Virginia (13–3)	Kansas State (16–3)	Kansas State (17–4) т	Wisconsin (18–5)	Michigan State (20–6)	Georgetown (18–7)	Michigan State (22–7)	Michigan State (24–7)	Butler (28–4)	11.
12.	Connecticut	Connecticut (1–0)	Butler (3–0)	Washington (5–0)	Michigan State (6–2)	Michigan State (8–2)	Kansas State (10–1)	Kansas State (11–1)	Georgetown (11–1)	North Carolina (12–4)	Georgetown (13–3)	BYU (20–1)	BYU (21–2)	Tennessee (18–4)	New Mexico (23–3)	Pittsburgh (21–6)	Butler (26–4)	Butler (26–4)	Temple (29–5)	12.
13.	California	California (2–0)	Connecticut (3–0)	Florida (7–0)	Ohio State (7–1)	Florida (8–1)	New Mexico (12–0)	Georgetown (9–1)	Connecticut (10–3)	Kansas State (13–2) т	Purdue (14–3)	Gonzaga (16–3)	Ohio State (16–6)	Ohio State (18–6)	Gonzaga (21–4)	BYU (25–3)	Vanderbilt (22–6)	Wisconsin (23–7)	Michigan State (24–8)	13.
14.	Washington	Washington (3–0)	Washington (4–0)	Connecticut (4–1)	Connecticut (6–1)	Connecticut (6–2)	Georgetown (8–1)	Tennessee (9–2)	Mississippi (12–2)	Wisconsin (12–2) т	BYU (18–1)	Tennessee (15–3)	Tennessee (16–4)	Texas (19–4)	Wisconsin (19–6)	Michigan State (21–7)	BYU (26–4)	BYU (28–4)	Georgetown (23–10)	14.
15.	Michigan	Michigan (2–0) т	Michigan (2–0)	Ohio State (5–1)	Georgetown (6–0)	Gonzaga (8–2)	Mississippi (10–1)	Ohio State (10–2)	New Mexico (14–2)	Connecticut (11–4)	Gonzaga (14–3)	Temple (16–4)	New Mexico (20–3)	New Mexico (21–3)	Texas (20–5)	Butler (25–4)	Wisconsin (21–7)	Tennessee (23–7)	Tennessee (25–8)	15.
16.	Ohio State	Ohio State (2–0) т	Louisville (3–0)	Georgetown (6–0)	Texas A&M (7–1)	Texas Tech (9–0)	Tennessee (8–2)	Mississippi (10–2)	Tennessee (10–2)	Pittsburgh (13–2)	Temple (15–3)	Wisconsin (15–4)	Wisconsin (16–5)	Gonzaga (19–4)	BYU (23–3)	Vanderbilt (20–6)	Tennessee (21–7)	Pittsburgh (24–7)	Wisconsin (23–8)	16.
17.	Oklahoma	Oklahoma (1–0)	Ohio State (3–1)	Gonzaga (6–2)	Washington (6–1)	Kansas State (9–1)	Ohio State (9–2)	Washington (9–2)	Wisconsin (12–2)	Gonzaga (12–3)	Clemson (15–3)	Pittsburgh (15–4)	Gonzaga (17–4)	BYU (22–3)	Vanderbilt (19–5)	Wisconsin (20–7)	Pittsburgh (22–7)	Temple (26–5)	BYU (29–5)	17.
18.	Mississippi State	Dayton (1–0)	Georgetown (3–0)	Clemson (7–2)	UNLV (7–0)	Ohio State (7–2)	Florida (8–2)	Temple (9–2)	Florida State (13–2)	BYU (16–1)	Wisconsin (14–4)	Mississippi (15–4)	Vanderbilt (16–4)	Butler (20–4)	Butler (23–4)	Gonzaga (22–5)	Gonzaga (24–5)	Gonzaga (25–5)	Pittsburgh (24–8)	18.
19.	Louisville	Georgetown (1–0)	Clemson (3–0)	Texas A&M (7–1)	Cincinnati (5–1)	New Mexico (10–0)	Texas A&M (9–2)	New Mexico (12–1)	Gonzaga (11–3)	Temple (13–3)	Georgia Tech (13–4)	Connecticut (13–6)	Temple (18–4)	Northern Iowa (21–2)	Pittsburgh (19–6)	Tennessee (20–6)	Georgetown (19–8)	Maryland (23–7)	Baylor (25–7)	19.
20.	Georgetown	Louisville (0–0)	Illinois (3–0)	Louisville (5–2)	Wisconsin (6–1)	Mississippi (8–1)	Butler (8–3)	Texas Tech (10–1)	Georgia Tech (11–3)	Georgia Tech (12–3)	Northern Iowa (16–1)	Ohio State (14–6)	Baylor (16–4)	Georgia Tech (17–6)	Tennessee (18–6)	Temple (22–5)	Temple (24–5)	Vanderbilt (23–7)	Maryland (23–8)	20.
21.	Dayton	Georgia Tech (1–0)	Maryland (3–0)	Florida State (7–2)	Gonzaga (6–2)	Butler (7–3)	Temple (9–2)	Clemson (11–2)	Temple (11–3)	Mississippi (12–3)	Ohio State (13–5)	Vanderbilt (15–3)	Georgia Tech (16–5)	Temple (19–5)	Temple (20–5)	Texas (21–6)	Baylor (22–6)	Baylor (24–6)	Vanderbilt (24–8)	21.
22.	Georgia Tech	Clemson (1–0)	Minnesota (3–0)	Cincinnati (5–1)	Butler (6–2)	Georgia Tech (6–1)	Washington (7–2)	Florida State (11–2)	Texas Tech (12–2)	Baylor (13–1)	Mississippi (13–4)	Georgia Tech (14–5)	Pittsburgh (16–5)	Vanderbilt (17–5)	Baylor (19–5)	Texas A&M (19–7)	Maryland (21–7)	Georgetown (20–9)	Gonzaga (26–6)	22.
23.	Illinois	Illinois (1–0)	Notre Dame (4–0)	Butler (6–2)	Texas Tech (8–0)	Texas A&M (8–2)	Texas Tech (9–1)	Wisconsin (10–2)	Pittsburgh (13–2)	Miami (FL) (15–1)	Mississippi State (15–3)	New Mexico (18–3)	Butler (18–4)	UNLV (19–4)	Wake Forest (18–5)	Richmond (22–6)	Texas A&M (20–8)	Texas A&M (22–8)	Texas A&M (23–9)	23.
24.	Clemson	Minnesota (1–0)	Vanderbilt (2–0)	UNLV (7–0)	Georgia Tech (6–1)	Washington (6–2)	Clemson (10–2)	UAB (11–1)	Washington (10–3)	Clemson (13–3)	North Carolina (12–6)	Baylor (15–3)	Northern Iowa (19–2)	Baylor (17–5)	Texas A&M (18–6)	Baylor (20–6)	UTEP (22–5)	Xavier (23–7)	Richmond (26–8)	24.
25.	Minnesota	Maryland (1–0)	Oklahoma (2–1)	Portland (5–2)	Mississippi (7–1)	Cincinnati (6–2)	Gonzaga (8–3)	Northwestern (10–1)	BYU (14–1)	Florida State (13–3)	Baylor (14–2)	UAB (17–2)	Mississippi (16–5)	Pittsburgh (17–6)	Richmond (20–6)	Northern Iowa (24–3)	Xavier (21–7)	UTEP (24–5)	Xavier (24–8)	25.
	Preseason Nov 2	Week 1 Nov 16	Week 2 Nov 23	Week 3 Nov 30	Week 4 Dec 7	Week 5 Dec 14	Week 6 Dec 21	Week 7 Dec 28	Week 8 Jan 4	Week 9 Jan 11	Week 10 Jan 18	Week 11 Jan 25	Week 12 Feb 1	Week 13 Feb 8	Week 14 Feb 15	Week 15 Feb 22	Week 16 Mar 1	Week 17 Mar 8	Week 18 Mar 15	
		Dropped: Mississippi St (0–1)	Dropped: California (2–2); Dayton (2–2); Georgia Tech (3–1)	Dropped: Michigan (2–2); Illinois (4–2); Maryland (4–2); Minnesota (4–2); Notre Dame (6–1); Vanderbilt (4–1); Oklahoma (3–3)	Dropped: Clemson (7–2); Louisville (5–2); Florida State (7–2); Portland (5–3)	Dropped: UNLV (7–1); Wisconsin (7–2)	Dropped: Georgia Tech (8–2); Cincinnati (7–3)	Dropped: Florida (8–3); Texas A&M (9–3); Butler (8–4); Gonzaga (8–3)	Dropped: Ohio State (10–4); Clemson (12–3); UAB (12–2); Northwestern (10–3)	Dropped: New Mexico (14–3); Texas Tech (12–3); Washington (10–5)	Dropped: Connecticut (11–6); Miami (FL) (15–3); Florida State (14–4)	Dropped: Clemson (15–5); Northern Iowa (17–2); Mississippi State (15–4); North Carolina (12–7)	Dropped: Connecticut (13–8); UAB (18–3)	Dropped: Mississippi (17–6)	Dropped: Northern Iowa (22–3); Georgia Tech (17–8); UNLV (19–6)	Dropped: Wake Forest (18–7)	Dropped: Texas (22–7); Richmond (22–7); Northern Iowa (25–4)	None	Dropped: UTEP (26–6)	

== ESPN/USA Today Coaches Poll ==
The Coaches Poll is the second oldest poll still in use after the AP Poll. It is compiled by a rotating group of 31 college Division I head coaches. The Poll operates by Borda count. Each voting member ranks teams from 1 to 25. Each team then receives points for their ranking in reverse order: Number 1 earns 25 points, number 2 earns 24 points, and so forth. The points are then combined and the team with the highest points is then ranked #1; second highest is ranked #2 and so forth. Only the top 25 teams with points are ranked, with teams receiving first place votes noted the quantity next to their name. Any team receiving votes after the top 25 are listed after the top 25 by their point totals. However, these are not real rankings: They are not considered #26, #27, etc. The maximum points a single team can earn is 775. The preseason poll was released on November 2, 2009.

	Preseason Nov 2	Week 1 Nov 16	Week 2 Nov 23	Week 3 Nov 30	Week 4 Dec 7	Week 5 Dec 14	Week 6 Dec 21	Week 7 Dec 28	Week 8 Jan 4	Week 9 Jan 11	Week 10 Jan 18	Week 11 Jan 25	Week 12 Feb 1	Week 13 Feb 8	Week 14 Feb 15	Week 15 Feb 22	Week 16 Mar 1	Week 17 Mar 8	Week 18 Mar 14	Week 19 Final	
1.	Kansas 27	Kansas (1–0)27	Kansas (3–0) 28	Kansas (5–0) 30	Kansas (7–0) 31	Kansas (9–0) 30	Kansas (10–0) 31	Kansas (11–0) 28	Kansas (13–0) 30	Texas (15–0) 30	Texas (17–0) 30	Kentucky (19–0) 31	Kansas (20–1) 26	Kansas (22–1) 29	Kansas (25–1) 30	Kansas (26–1) 30	Syracuse (27–2) 23	Kansas (29–2) 30	Kansas (32–2) 31	Duke (35–5) 31	1.
2.	Michigan State 3	Michigan St (1–0) 3	Michigan St (4–0) 2	Texas (5–0)	Texas (6–0)	Texas (8–0)	Texas (10–0)	Texas (11–0) 3	Texas (14–0) 1	Kentucky (16–0) 1	Kentucky (18–0) 1	Kansas (18–1)	Villanova (19–1) 4	Kentucky (22–1) 1	Kentucky (24–1) 1	Kentucky (26–1) 1	Kansas (27–2) 7	Kentucky (29–2)	Kentucky (32–2)	Butler (33–5)	2.
3.	Texas	Texas (1–0)	Texas (2–0)	Villanova (6–0)	Villanova (8–0)	Kentucky (10–0) 1	Kentucky (11–0)	Kentucky (13–0)	Kentucky (15–0)	Kansas (14–1)	Kansas (16–1)	Villanova (18–1)	Kentucky (20–1) 1	Syracuse (23–1) 1	Villanova (22–3)	Purdue (23–3)	Kentucky (27–2)	Syracuse (28–3) 1	Duke (29–5)	West Virginia (31–7)	3.
4.	North Carolina 1	North Carolina (3–0) 1	Villanova (5–0)	Kentucky (6–0)	Kentucky (8–0)	Purdue (9–0)	Purdue (10–0)	Purdue (11–0)	Purdue (14–0)	Villanova (14–1)	Villanova (16–1)	Syracuse (19–1)	Syracuse (21–1)	West Virginia (19–3)	Purdue (21–3)	Syracuse (25–2)	Duke (25–4) 1	Duke (26–5)	Syracuse (28–4)	Michigan State (28–9)	4.
5.	Kentucky	Kentucky (3–0)	Kentucky (4–0)	Duke (6–0) 1	Purdue (7–0)	Syracuse (10–0)	Syracuse (11–0)	Syracuse (12–0)	Duke (12–1)	Syracuse (15–1)	Syracuse (17–1)	Michigan State (17–3)	Michigan State (19–3)	Villanova (20–2)	Syracuse (24–2)	Duke (23–4)	Kansas State (24–4)	Purdue (26–4)	West Virginia (27–6)	Kentucky (35–3)	5.
6.	Villanova	Villanova (1–0)	Purdue (3–0)	Purdue (5–0)	Syracuse (8–0)	West Virginia (7–0)	West Virginia (8–0)	West Virginia (10–0)	Villanova (12–1)	Purdue (14–1)	Duke (15–2)	Texas (17–2)	West Virginia (17–3)	Purdue (19–3)	Duke (21–4)	Kansas State (22–4)	Purdue (24–4)	West Virginia (24–6)	Ohio State (27–7)	Kansas (33–3)	6.
7.	Purdue	Purdue (1–0)	Duke (4–0) 1	Syracuse (6–0)	West Virginia (5–0)	Duke (7–1)	Duke (9–1)	Duke (9–1)	Syracuse (13–1)	Duke (13–2)	Michigan State (15–3)	Duke (17–3)	Purdue (18–3)	Duke (19–4)	Kansas State (20–4)	West Virginia (21–5)	Ohio State (23–7)	Ohio State (24–7)	Kansas State (26–7)	Kansas State (29–8)	7.
8.	Duke	Duke (1–0)	West Virginia (1–0)	West Virginia (5–0)	Duke (7–1)	Tennessee (7–1)	Villanova (10–1)	Villanova (11–1)	West Virginia (11–1)	Michigan State (13–3)	Tennessee (14–2)	Gonzaga (16–3)	Georgetown (16–4)	Georgetown (17–5)	West Virginia (19–5)	Villanova (22–4)	West Virginia (22–6)	New Mexico (28–3)	Butler (28–4)	Syracuse (30–5)	8.
9.	West Virginia	West Virginia (1–0)	Syracuse (4–0)	Michigan State (5–1)	Tennessee (6–1)	Villanova (9–1)	Michigan State (9–2)	North Carolina (9–3)	North Carolina (11–4)	West Virginia (12–2)	Kansas State (15–2)	West Virginia (15–3)	Duke (17–4)	Kansas State (19–4)	Gonzaga (21–4)	Ohio State (21–7)	Villanova (23–5)	Kansas State (24–6)	Villanova (24–7)	Tennessee (28–9)	9.
10.	Butler	Butler (1–0)	Butler (3–0)	Washington (5–0)	North Carolina (7–2)	North Carolina (8–2)	North Carolina (8–3)	Connecticut (9–2)	Kansas State (13–1)	Tennessee (12–2)	Gonzaga (14–3)	BYU (20–1)	Texas (18–3)	Michigan State (19–5)	Georgetown (18–6)	Butler (25–4)	New Mexico (27–3)	Villanova (24–6)	New Mexico (29–4)	Baylor (28–8)	10.
11.	Tennessee	Tennessee (1–0)	Tennessee (4–0)	North Carolina (6–1)	Florida (8–0)	Georgetown (8–0)	Connecticut (7–2)	Michigan State (9–3)	Michigan State (11–3)	Georgetown (12–2)	Pittsburgh (15–2)	Georgetown (15–3)	Kansas State (17–4)	Gonzaga (19–4)	Michigan State (20–6)	BYU (25–3)	Butler (26–4)	Michigan State (24–7)	Purdue (27–5)	Ohio State (29–8)	11.
12.	California	California (2–0)	North Carolina (4–1)	Tennessee (5–1)	Connecticut (6–1)	Michigan State (8–2)	New Mexico (12–0)	Kansas State (11–1)	Georgetown (11–1)	Kansas State (13–2)	West Virginia (13–3)	Purdue (16–3)	BYU (21–2)	Tennessee (18–4)	Ohio State (20–6)	New Mexico (25–3)	Michigan State (22–7)	Butler (27–4)	Michigan State (24–8)	Purdue (29–6)	12.
13.	Washington	Connecticut (1–0)	Connecticut (3–0)	Connecticut (4–1)	Georgetown (6–0)	Florida (8–1)	Georgetown (8–1)	Georgetown (9–1)	Connecticut (10–3)	North Carolina (12–4)	BYU (18–1)	Kansas State (16–3)	Gonzaga (17–4)	Wisconsin (18–5)	Butler (23–4)	Georgetown (18–7)	Tennessee (21–7)	Tennessee (23–7)	Temple (29–5)	Northern Iowa (30–5)	13.
14.	Connecticut	Washington (3–0)	Washington (4–0)	Georgetown (4–0)	Michigan State (6–2)	Connecticut (6–2)	Tennessee (8–2)	Tennessee (9–2)	New Mexico (14–2)	Gonzaga (12–3)	Georgetown (13–3)	Tennessee (15–3)	Tennessee (16–4)	Texas (19–4)	BYU (23–3)	Michigan State (21–7)	Gonzaga (24–5)	Gonzaga (26–5)	Tennessee (25–8)	Xavier (26–9)	14.
15.	Michigan	Ohio State (2–0)	Michigan (2–0)	Ohio State (5–1)	Ohio State (7–1)	Gonzaga (8–2) т	Kansas State (10–1)	Ohio State (10–2)	Tennessee (10–2)	Connecticut (11–4)	Purdue (14–3)	Temple (17–3)	Butler (18–4)	Butler (20–4)	New Mexico (23–3)	Gonzaga (22–5)	BYU (26–4)	BYU (28–4)	Georgetown (23–10)	Villanova (25–8)	15.
16.	Oklahoma	Michigan (1–0)	Louisville (3–0) т	Gonzaga (5–1)	Washington (6–1)	Georgia Tech (6–1) т	Butler (8–3)	Washington (9–2)	Mississippi (12–2)	Wisconsin (12–2)	Clemson (15–3)	Wisconsin (16–4)	Wisconsin (16–5)	Ohio State (18–6)	Wisconsin (19–6)	Pittsburgh (21–6)	Temple (24–5)	Pittsburgh (24–7)	BYU (29–5) т	New Mexico (30–5)	16.
17.	Ohio State	Oklahoma (1–0)	Minnesota (3–0) т	Florida (6–0)	UNLV (7–0)	Butler (7–3)	Ohio State (9–2)	New Mexico (12–1)	Georgia Tech (11–3)	BYU (16–1)	Temple (15–3)	Pittsburgh (15–4)	Temple (18–4)	BYU (22–3)	Texas (20–5)	Tennessee (20–6)	Wisconsin (21–7)	Temple (26–5)	Pittsburgh (24–8) т	Cornell (29–5)	17.
18.	Minnesota	Minnesota (1–0)	Ohio State (3–1)	Louisville (4–1)	Texas A&M (7–1)	Ohio State (7–2)	Florida (8–2)	Clemson (11–2)	Gonzaga (11–3)	Georgia Tech (12–3)	Georgia Tech (13–4)	Butler (16–4)	Ohio State (16–6)	Northern Iowa (21–2)	Tennessee (18–6)	Temple (22–5)	Pittsburgh (22–7)	Wisconsin (23–7)	Gonzaga (26–6)	Maryland (24–9)	18.
19.	Mississippi State	Georgia Tech (1–0)	Georgetown (3–0) т	Clemson (6–1)	Cincinnati (5–1)	New Mexico (10–0)	Washington (7–2)	Temple (9–2)	Florida State (13–2)	Clemson (13–3)	Wisconsin (14–4)	Connecticut (13–6)	Georgia Tech (16–5)	New Mexico (21–3)	Vanderbilt (19–5)	Wisconsin (20–7)	Vanderbilt (22–6)	Maryland (23–7)	Wisconsin (23–8)	Saint Mary's (28–6)	19.
20.	Georgia Tech	Georgetown (1–0)	Clemson (3–0) т	Butler (4–2)	Butler (6–2)	Texas Tech (9–0)	UNLV (10–1)	Georgia Tech (9–2)	Wisconsin (12–2)	Pittsburgh (13–2)	Butler (14–4)	Mississippi (15–4)	Vanderbilt (16–4)	Georgia Tech (17–6)	Temple (20–5)	Vanderbilt (20–6)	Georgetown (19–8)	Baylor (24–6)	Maryland (23–8)	Pittsburgh (25–9)	20.
21.	Georgetown	Dayton (1–0)	Illinois (3–0)	UNLV (5–0)	Georgia Tech (6–1)	Washington (6–2)	Mississippi (10–1)	Mississippi (10–2)	Clemson (12–3)	Temple (13–3)	Connecticut (11–6)	Clemson (15–5)	Pittsburgh (16–5)	Temple (19–5)	Pittsburgh (19–6)	Texas (21–6)	UTEP (22–5)	UTEP (24–5)	Baylor (25–7)	Washington (26–10)	21.
22.	Dayton	Louisville (0–0)	Maryland (3–0)	Texas A&M (5–1)	Gonzaga (6–2)	Kansas State (9–1)	Georgia Tech (8–2)	Gonzaga (8–3)	Washington (10–3)	Butler (12–4)	Northern Iowa (16–1)	Georgia Tech (14–5)	Northern Iowa (19–2)	Cornell (20–3)	Baylor (19–5)	Northern Iowa (24–3)	Baylor (22–6)	Georgetown (20–9)	Vanderbilt (24–8)	BYU (30–6)	22.
23.	Louisville	Clemson (1–0)	California (2–2)	Georgia Tech (4–1)	Wisconsin (6–1)	UNLV (7–1)	Clemson (10–2)	Butler (8–4)	BYU (14–1)	Mississippi (12–3)	North Carolina (12–6)	Vanderbilt (15–3)	New Mexico (20–3)	Pittsburgh (17–6)	Texas A&M (18–7)	Texas A&M (19–7)	Maryland (21–7)	Vanderbilt (23–7)	Texas A&M (23–9)	Gonzaga (27–7)	23.
24.	Clemson	Syracuse (2–0)	Vanderbilt (2–0)	Cincinnati (4–1)	Clemson (7–2)	Clemson (8–2)	Gonzaga (8–3)	Texas Tech (10–1)	Butler (10–4)	Baylor (13–1)	Mississippi (13–4)	Ohio State (14–6)	Baylor (16–4)	Vanderbilt (17–5)	Northern Iowa (22–3)	Richmond (22–6)	Texas A&M (20–8)	Texas A&M (22–8)	Northern Iowa (28–4)	Wisconsin (24–9)	24.
25.	Syracuse	Illinois (1–0)	Georgia Tech (3–1)	California (4–2)	Vanderbilt (6–1)	Mississippi (8–1)	Temple (9–2)	Florida State (11–2)	Temple (11–3)	Florida State (13–3)	Ohio State (13–5)	Northern Iowa (17–2)	Cornell (18–3)	UNLV (19–4)	Wake Forest (18–5)	UTEP (20–5)	Texas (22–7)	Northern Iowa (28–4)	UTEP (26–6)	Texas A&M (24–10)	25.
	Preseason Nov 2	Week 1 Nov 16	Week 2 Nov 23	Week 3 Nov 30	Week 4 Dec 7	Week 5 Dec 14	Week 6 Dec 21	Week 7 Dec 28	Week 8 Jan 4	Week 9 Jan 11	Week 10 Jan 18	Week 11 Jan 25	Week 12 Feb 1	Week 13 Feb 8	Week 14 Feb 15	Week 15 Feb 22	Week 16 Mar 1	Week 17 Mar 8	Week 18 Mar 14	Week 19 Final	
		Dropped: Mississippi State (0–1)	Dropped: Oklahoma (2–1); Dayton (2–2)	Dropped: Michigan (3–2); Minnesota (4–2); Illinois (4–2); Maryland (4–2); Vanderbilt (4–1)	Dropped: Louisville (5–2); California (5–3)	Dropped: Texas A&M (8–2); Cincinnati (6–2); Wisconsin (7–2); Vanderbilt (6–3)	Dropped: Texas Tech (9–1)	Dropped: Florida (8–3); UNLV (12–2)	Dropped: Ohio State (10–4); Texas Tech (12–2)	Dropped: New Mexico (14–3); Washington (10–5)	Dropped: Baylor (14–2); Florida State (14–4)	Dropped: North Carolina (12–7)	Dropped: Connecticut (13–8); Mississippi (16–5); Clemson (16–6)	Dropped: Baylor (17–5)	Dropped: Georgia Tech (17–8); Cornell (21–4); UNLV (19–6)	None	Dropped: Northern Iowa (25–4); Richmond (22–7)	Dropped: Texas (24–8)	None	Dropped: Temple (29–6); Georgetown (23–11); Vanderbilt (24–9); UTEP (26–7)	

== Preseason polls ==
Various publications and news sources release their preseason top 25 months before the season commences.

	Athlon	Lindy's	Sporting News	Fox Sports	CBS Sports	SI.com	Sports Illustrated	Rivals.com	Blue Ribbon Yearbook
1.	Kansas	Kansas	Kansas	Kansas	Kansas	Kansas	Kansas	Kansas	Kansas
2.	Michigan State	Texas	Kentucky	Kentucky	Kentucky	Michigan State	Michigan State	Kentucky	Michigan State
3.	Texas	Michigan State	Michigan State	Texas	Michigan State	Connecticut	Villanova	Michigan State	Texas
4.	Purdue	Villanova	North Carolina	Michigan State	Texas	Villanova	Texas	Villanova	Villanova
5.	North Carolina	North Carolina	West Virginia	North Carolina	North Carolina	Kentucky	Kentucky	Purdue	North Carolina
6.	Kentucky	Purdue	Texas	West Virginia	Villanova	Texas	Purdue	Texas	Purdue
7.	Villanova	Butler	Purdue	Villanova	Connecticut	Purdue	North Carolina	North Carolina	Kentucky
8.	Tennessee	Kentucky	Duke	California	Purdue	West Virginia	West Virginia	Duke	California
9.	Oklahoma	Michigan	Villanova	Washington	West Virginia	North Carolina	Washington	West Virginia	Duke
10.	West Virginia	California	Mississippi State	Purdue	Duke	Butler	Connecticut	California	Tennessee
11.	Connecticut	Duke	Georgetown	Tennessee	Butler	Washington	California	Butler	Butler
12.	Butler	Tennessee	Tennessee	Connecticut	Washington	Duke	Duke	Connecticut	West Virginia
13.	Georgia Tech	Georgia Tech	Washington	Duke	Clemson	Tennessee	Tennessee	Ohio State	Georgia Tech
14.	California	Oklahoma	Butler	Butler	Tennessee	California	Butler	Michigan	Minnesota
15.	Mississippi State	Louisville	Connecticut	Ohio State	Oklahoma	Ohio State	Michigan	Washington	Syracuse
16.	Vanderbilt	Washington	California	Michigan	Minnesota	Michigan	Ohio State	Oklahoma	Ohio State
17.	Washington	Dayton	Clemson	Georgia Tech	Dayton	Clemson	Louisville	Tennessee	Oklahoma
18.	Duke	West Virginia	Wake Forest	Illinois	Ohio State	Georgetown	Mississippi State	Georgetown	Connecticut
19.	Louisville	Tulsa	Ohio State	Georgetown	Michigan	Dayton	Georgetown	Oklahoma State	Dayton
20.	BYU	Maryland	Maryland	Minnesota	California	Siena	Siena	Louisville	Maryland
21.	Georgetown	Mississippi St	Illinois	Oklahoma	Siena	Mississippi St	Georgia Tech	Siena	Oklahoma St
22.	Maryland	Ohio State	Notre Dame	Siena	Louisville	South Carolina	Dayton	Dayton	Michigan
23.	Michigan	UCLA	Dayton	Vanderbilt	Illinois	Georgia Tech	Maryland	Clemson	Washington
24.	Clemson	South Carolina	Michigan	Xavier	Georgetown	Oklahoma	Oklahoma	Illinois	Georgetown
25.	Dayton	Illinois	Florida State	Mississippi	Gonzaga	Gonzaga	Illinois	Georgia Tech	Siena/Illinois
