= 2010 America East men's basketball tournament =

- Classification: Division I
- Season: 2009–10
- First round site: Chase Arena; West Hartford, Connecticut
- Quarterfinals site: Chase Arena; West Hartford, Connecticut
- Semifinals site: Chase Arena; West Hartford, Connecticut
- Finals site: Patrick Gym; Burlington, VT
- Champions: Vermont (4th title)
- Winning coach: Mike Lonergan (1st title)
- MVP: Marqus Blakely (Vermont)

2009–10 America East men's basketball standings
	Conf.				Overall
Team	W		L	PCT	W		L	PCT
Stony Brook	13	–	3	.813	22	–	10	.688
Vermont †	12	–	4	.750	25	–	10	.714
Maine	11	–	5	.688	19	–	11	.633
Boston University	11	–	5	.688	21	–	14	.600
Binghamton	8	–	8	.500	13	–	18	.419
Hartford	6	–	10	.375	8	–	22	.267
New Hampshire	6	–	10	.375	13	–	17	.433
UMBC	3	–	13	.188	4	–	26	.133
Albany	2	–	14	.125	7	–	25	.219
† 2010 America East tournament winner As of March 19, 2010; Rankings from AP Poll

The 2010 America East men's basketball tournament was held from March 4–7 at Chase Arena on the University of Hartford campus. The final was held at Patrick Gym in Burlington, VT on March 13. As winners, the Vermont Catamounts won an automatic berth to the 2010 NCAA Division I men's basketball tournament for the fourth time as a member of the America East conference, and first since 2005. Vermont was given the 16th seed in the West Regional of the NCAA Tournament and faced the #1 seed Syracuse Orange in a game played on March 19. As winners of the regular season championship the Stony Brook claimed an automatic berth to the 2010 National Invitation Tournament, seeded at #8, the Seawolves took on #1 seeded Illinois Fighting Illini at home on March 17. The Boston University also gained a bid to the 2010 CBI, were given the #4 seed in the West Region, and faced the Oregon State Beavers on March 17 in Corvallis, OR.

== Bracket and results ==
Quarterfinals; Saturday, March 6
1	Stony Brook	68
8	Albany	59
4	Boston University	87
5	Hartford	46
3	Maine	57
6	New Hampshire	68
2	Vermont	76
7	UMBC	59

Semifinals; Sunday, March 7
1	Stony Brook	63
4	Boston University	70
6	New Hampshire	38
2	Vermont	57

Finals; Saturday, March 13
4	Boston University	70
2	Vermont	83

== Trivia ==
- Binghamton was initially slated as the #5 seed in the tournament. However, due to a series of scandals surrounding the program, the Bearcats announced they would sit out the tournament. According to The New York Times, the conference's other members pressured Binghamton to sit out. Conference commissioner Patrick Nero, however, said the decision was Binghamton's alone. Therefore this led to the original #6 seed Hartford Hawks to become the #5 seed, the #7 seed New Hampshire Wildcats to become #6, and the cancellation of the first-round game between UMBC and Albany who become the #7 and #8 seeds in the tournament.
- This was the first time in America East Conference history that the Men's and Women's basketball tournaments were held at the same arena over the same weekend.
- It was also the first time the Women's Championship game was not held at a 'neutral site' and was played at the highest remaining seed's home arena.

== See also ==
- America East Conference
