= 2009–10 Vermont Catamounts men's basketball team =

American college basketball season

2009–10 Vermont Catamounts men's basketball

America East Tournament champions

NCAA tournament, Round of 64
- Conference: America East Conference
- Record: 25–10 (12–4 America East)
- Head coach: Mike Lonergan (5th season)
- Assistant coaches: Hajj Turner; John Becker; Matt O'Brien
- Home arena: Patrick Gym

2009–10 America East men's basketball standings
	Conf.				Overall
Team	W		L	PCT	W		L	PCT
Stony Brook	13	–	3	.813	22	–	10	.688
Vermont †	12	–	4	.750	25	–	10	.714
Maine	11	–	5	.688	19	–	11	.633
Boston University	11	–	5	.688	21	–	14	.600
Binghamton	8	–	8	.500	13	–	18	.419
Hartford	6	–	10	.375	8	–	22	.267
New Hampshire	6	–	10	.375	13	–	17	.433
UMBC	3	–	13	.188	4	–	26	.133
Albany	2	–	14	.125	7	–	25	.219
† 2010 America East tournament winner As of March 19, 2010; Rankings from AP Poll

The 2009–10 Vermont Catamounts men's basketball team represented the University of Vermont in the 2009–10 NCAA Division I men's basketball season. The Catamounts won the America East conference tournament title for the first time since 2005 to earn the conference’s automatic berth in the NCAA tournament. The Catamounts lost in the first round to No. 1 seed Syracuse, 79–56.

== Roster ==
2009–10 Vermont Catamounts men's basketball team
Players
Coaches

Pos.	#	Name	Height	Weight	Year	Hometown
F	23	Marqus Blakely	6 ft 5 in (1.96 m)	225 lb (102 kg)	Sr	Metuchen, New Jersey
G	24	Maurice Joseph	6 ft 4 in (1.93 m)	190 lb (86 kg)	Sr
F	32	Evan Fjeld	6 ft 8 in (2.03 m)	215 lb (98 kg)	Jr	Durham, North Carolina

Head coach

- Mike Lonergan

Assistant coach(es)

Legend

- (C) Team captain
- (S) Suspended
- (I) Ineligible
- (W) Walk-on
- Injured
- Current redshirt

== Schedule and results ==
Date time, TV	Rank^{#}	Opponent^{#}	Result	Record	Site (attendance) city, state
Regular season
Nov 13, 2009*		at Loyola (MD)	L 66–79	0–1	Reitz Arena (2,100); Baltimore, Maryland
Nov 15, 2009*		at Buffalo	W 58–57	1–1	Alumni Arena (2,996); Buffalo, New York
Nov 22, 2009*		at Rutgers	W 77–71	2–1	Louis Brown Athletic Center (4,966); Piscataway, New Jersey
Nov 24, 2009*		at Providence	L 64–106	2–2	Dunkin' Donuts Center (6,954); Providence, Rhode Island
Nov 27, 2009*		at Drexel	L 61–74	2–3	Daskalakis Athletic Center (1,347); Philadelphia, Pennsylvania
Nov 28, 2009*		vs. Cornell	L 59–67	2–4	Daskalakis Athletic Center (500); Philadelphia, Pennsylvania
Nov 29, 2009*		vs. Toledo	W 82–49	3–4	Daskalakis Athletic Center (500); Philadelphia, Pennsylvania
Dec 1, 2009*		at Dartmouth	W 63–58	4–4	Leede Arena (1,013); Hanover, New Hampshire
Dec 5, 2009*		at NJIT	W 88–49	5–4	Prudential Center (323); Newark, New Jersey
Dec 7, 2009*		at Yale	W 72–60	6–4	Payne Whitney Gymnasium (955); New Haven, Connecticut
Dec 13, 2009*		Quinnipiac	W 80–77	7–4	Patrick Gymnasium (2,558); Burlington, Vermont
Dec 20, 2009*		Delaware	L 50–56	7–5	Patrick Gymnasium (2,477); Burlington, Vermont
Dec 28, 2009*		at Marist	W 72–62	8–5	McCann Arena (1,806); Poughkeepsie, New York
Dec 30, 2009*		at Mount St. Mary's	W 71–69	9–5	Knott Arena (1,659); Emmitsburg, Maryland
Jan 2, 2010		UMBC	W 73–58	10–5 (1–0)	Patrick Gymnasium (2,459); Burlington, Vermont
Jan 7, 2010		at Maine	W 64–56	11–5 (2–0)	Alfond Arena (1,012); Orono, Maine
Jan 10, 2010		at Albany	W 71–54	12–5 (3–0)	SEFCU Arena (3,014); Albany, New York
Jan 17, 2010		Boston University	W 78–58	13–5 (4–0)	Patrick Gymnasium (3,266); Burlington, Vermont
Jan 19, 2010		Hartford	W 78–66	14–5 (5–0)	Patrick Gymnasium (2,635); Burlington, Vermont
Jan 21, 2010		Stony Brook	L 60–65	14–6 (5–1)	Patrick Gymnasium (2,909); Burlington, Vermont
Jan 24, 2010		at Binghamton	L 67–73	14–7 (5–2)	Binghamton University Events Center (3,928); Binghamton, New York
Jan 27, 2010		at New Hampshire	L 56–75	14–8 (5–3)	Lundholm Gym (2,355); Durham, New Hampshire
Jan 30, 2010		Albany	W 64–46	15–8 (6–3)	Patrick Gymnasium (3,266); Burlington, Vermont
Feb 3, 2010		Maine	W 64–51	16–8 (7–3)	Patrick Gymnasium (2,577); Burlington, Vermont
Feb 5, 2010		at UMBC	W 79–60	17–8 (8–3)	RAC Arena (670); Catonsville, Maryland
Feb 9, 2010		at Boston University	W 76–75	18–8 (9–3)	Agganis Arena (968); Boston, Massachusetts
Feb 14, 2010		New Hampshire	W 85–76 ^{OT}	19–8 (10–3)	Patrick Gymnasium (3,266); Burlington, Vermont
Feb 17, 2010		at Hartford	W 74–56	20–8 (11–3)	Chase Arena at Reich Family Pavilion (1,127); Hartford, Connecticut
Feb 20, 2010*		Fairfield; ESPN BracketBusters	W 77–67	21–8	Patrick Gymnasium (2,585); Burlington, Vermont
Feb 24, 2010		at Stony Brook	L 78–82	21–9 (11–4)	Pritchard Gymnasium (1,650); Stony Brook, New York
Feb 28, 2010		Binghamton	W 78–69	22–9 (12–4)	Patrick Gymnasium (3,266); Burlington, Vermont
America East tournament
Mar 6, 2010*	(2)	vs. (7) UMBC; Quarterfinals	W 76–59	23–9	Chase Arena at Reich Family Pavilion (2,160); Hartford, Connecticut
Mar 7, 2010*	(2)	vs. (6) New Hampshire; Semifinals	W 57–38	24–9	Chase Arena at Reich Family Pavilion (2,440); Hartford, Connecticut
Mar 13, 2010*	(2)	(4) Boston University; Championship	W 83–70	25–9	Patrick Gymnasium (3,266); Burlington, Vermont
NCAA Tournament
Mar 19, 2010*	(16 W)	vs. (1 W) No. 4 Syracuse; NCAA First Round	L 56–79	25–10	HSBC Arena (18,948); Buffalo, New York
*Non-conference game. ^{#}Rankings from AP Poll. (#) Tournament seedings in parentheses. W=NCAA West Regional.
