= 2009–10 Stony Brook Seawolves men's basketball team =

American college basketball season

2009–10 Stony Brook Seawolves men's basketball

America East regular season champions

NIT, First Round
- Conference: America East Conference
- Record: 22–10 (13–3 America East)
- Head coach: Steve Pikiell (5th season)
- Assistant coaches: Jay Young (5th season); Lamar Chapman; Dan Rickard
- Home arena: Pritchard Gymnasium

2009–10 America East men's basketball standings
	Conf.				Overall
Team	W		L	PCT	W		L	PCT
Stony Brook	13	–	3	.813	22	–	10	.688
Vermont †	12	–	4	.750	25	–	10	.714
Maine	11	–	5	.688	19	–	11	.633
Boston University	11	–	5	.688	21	–	14	.600
Binghamton	8	–	8	.500	13	–	18	.419
Hartford	6	–	10	.375	8	–	22	.267
New Hampshire	6	–	10	.375	13	–	17	.433
UMBC	3	–	13	.188	4	–	26	.133
Albany	2	–	14	.125	7	–	25	.219
† 2010 America East tournament winner As of March 19, 2010; Rankings from AP Poll

The 2009–10 Stony Brook Seawolves men's basketball team was a college basketball team which represented Stony Brook University in the 2009–10 college basketball season. This was head coach Steve Pikiell's fifth season at Stony Brook. The Seawolves competed in the America East Conference and played their home games at Pritchard Gymnasium. They finished the season 22–10, 13–3 in America East play to win the regular season championship. They lost in the semifinals of the 2010 America East men's basketball tournament but received an automatic bid to the 2010 National Invitation Tournament as the regular season champions. The NIT berth was Stony Brook's first ever postseason bid as a Division I school. They hosted Illinois in the first round and lost 76–66.

== Roster ==
#	Name	Height	Weight (lbs.)	Position	Class	Hometown	Previous Team(s)
1	Preye Preboye	6'6"	220	G/F	Fr.	Springfield, MA	Winchendon Prep
2	Danny Carter	6'9"	210	F	So.	Windsor, England	Reading Rockets
10	Bryan Dougher	6'1"	185	G	So.	Scotch Plains, NJ	Scotch Plains-Fanwood HS
11	Marcus Rouse	6'0"	170	G	Fr.	Upper Marlboro, MD	DeMatha HS
12	Eddie Castellanos	6'1"	180	G	Sr.	Jersey City, NJ	Hoboken HS
15	Leonard Hayes	6'4"	185	G	Fr.	Voorhees, NJ	Lawrenceville Prep
20	Desmond Adedeji	6'10"	305	F/C	Sr.	Landover Hills, MD	DeMatha HS; Dayton
22	Eric McAlister	6'8"	200	F	Fr.	Hightstown, NJ	Hightstown HS
23	Dallis Joyner	6'7"	250	F	So.	Norfolk, VA	Granby HS
24	Tommy Brenton	6'5"	215	G/F	So.	Columbia, MD	Hargrave Military Academy
30	Chris Martin	6'1"	223	G	Jr.	Springfield Gardens, NY	Christ The King HS
32	Andrew Goba	6'9"	235	F/C	Sr.	Durban, South Africa	Durban HS
35	Muhammad El-Amin	6'5"	210	G	Sr.	Lansing, MI	Holt HS; Lansing CC

== Schedule and results ==
- All times are Eastern

Date time, TV	Rank^{#}	Opponent^{#}	Result	Record	Site (attendance) city, state
Regular Season
11/13/2009*; 7:00pm		at Maryland Eastern Shore	W 75–57	1–0	Hytche Athletic Center (1,713); Princess Anne, MD
11/16/2009*; 7:00pm		Mount St. Mary's	W 87–53	2–0	Pritchard Gymnasium (1,258); Stony Brook, NY
11/21/2009*; 7:00pm		at Wagner	W 72–48	3–0	Spiro Sports Center (1,310); Staten Island, NY
11/24/2009*; 7:30pm		at Rhode Island	L 58-75	3–1	Ryan Center (4,030); Kingston, RI
11/28/2009*; 2:00pm		NJIT	W 60–46	4–1	Pritchard Gymnasium (842); Stony Brook, NY
11/30/2009*; 7:00pm		at Lehigh	W 71–52	5–1	Stabler Arena (609); Bethlehem, PA
12/2/2009*; 7:00pm, SNY		at St. John's	L 55-63	5–2	Carnesecca Arena (3,302); Queens, NY
12/5/2009*; 2:00pm, MSG Plus		Columbia	W 63–60	6–2	Pritchard Gymnasium (1,342); Stony Brook, NY
12/8/2009*; 7:00pm		at Fordham	L 77-93	6–3	Rose Hill Gymnasium (1,250); The Bronx, NY
12/12/2009*; 2:00pm		at Colgate	W 66–55	7–3	Cotterell Court (406); Hamilton, NY
12/21/2009*; 3:00pm		at Sacred Heart	L 70-78	7–4	William H. Pitt Center (279); Fairfield, CT
12/28/2009*; 7:00pm		Saint Peter's	L 46-67	7–5	Pritchard Gymnasium (1,113); Stony Brook, NY
12/31/2009*; 2:00pm		Holy Cross	W 69–60	8–5	Pritchard Gymnasium (1,144); Stony Brook, NY
1/2/2010; 12:00pm, MSG Plus/NESN		at Boston University	W 84–75	9–5 (1–0)	Case Gym (547); Boston, MA
1/7/2010; 7:00pm		Hartford	W 70–59	10–5 (2–0)	Pritchard Gymnasium (1,029); Stony Brook, NY
1/10/2010; 2:00pm		New Hampshire	W 69–63	11–5 (3–0)	Pritchard Gymnasium (971); Stony Brook, NY
1/12/2010; 7:00pm		at Binghamton	L 62–64	11–6 (3–1)	Binghamton University Events Center (2,578); Vestal, NY
1/16/2010; 2:00pm		at Maine	L 61–67	11–7 (3–2)	Alfond Arena (1,507); Orono, ME
1/18/2010; 5:00pm, MSG Plus/MASN		UMBC	W 81–69	12–7 (4–2)	Pritchard Gymnasium (1,058); Stony Brook, NY
1/21/2010; 7:00pm		at Vermont	W 65–60	13–7 (5–2)	Patrick Gym (2,909); Burlington, VT
1/24/2010; 12:00pm, MSG Plus		Albany	W 67–61	14–7 (6–2)	Pritchard Gymnasium (1,139); Stony Brook, NY
1/30/2010; 7:00pm		Boston University	W 71–55	15–7 (7–2)	Pritchard Gymnasium (1,595); Stony Brook, NY
2/3/2010; 7:00pm		at Hartford	W 54–44	16–7 (8–2)	Chase Arena at Reich Family Pavilion (1,062); Hartford, CT
2/10/2010; 7:00pm		Maine	W 83–64	17–7 (9–2)	Pritchard Gymnasium (1,595); Stony Brook, NY
2/13/2010; 7:00pm		Binghamton	W 81–61	18–7 (10–2)	Pritchard Gymnasium (1,630); Stony Brook, NY
2/16/2010; 7:00pm		at UMBC	W 86–72	19–7 (11–2)	Retriever Activities Center (2,010); Baltimore, MD
2/19/2010; 7:00pm, MSG Plus		at Albany	W 68–66	20–7 (12–2)	SEFCU Arena (2,891); Albany, NY
2/24/2010; 7:00pm, MSG Plus/NESN		Vermont	W 82–78	21–7 (13–2)	Pritchard Gymnasium (1,650); Stony Brook, NY
2/28/2010; 1:00pm		at New Hampshire	L 55–77	21–8 (13–3)	Lundholm Gym (1,136); Durham, NH
America East tournament
3/6/2010; 12:00pm	(1)	vs. (8) Albany; AE Quarterfinals	W 68–59	22–8	Chase Arena at Reich Family Pavilion; Hartford, CT
3/7/2010; 5:00pm	(1)	vs. (4) Boston University; AE Semifinals	L 63–70	22–9	Chase Arena at Reich Family Pavilion; Hartford, CT
NIT
3/17/2010; 9:00pm, ESPNU	(8 I)	(1 I) Illinois; NIT First round	L 66–76	22–10	Stony Brook Arena (4,423); Stony Brook, NY
*Non-conference game. ^{#}Rankings from AP Poll. (#) Tournament seedings in parentheses. I=NIT Illinois bracket.
