= Mike Lonergan =

American basketball player and coach

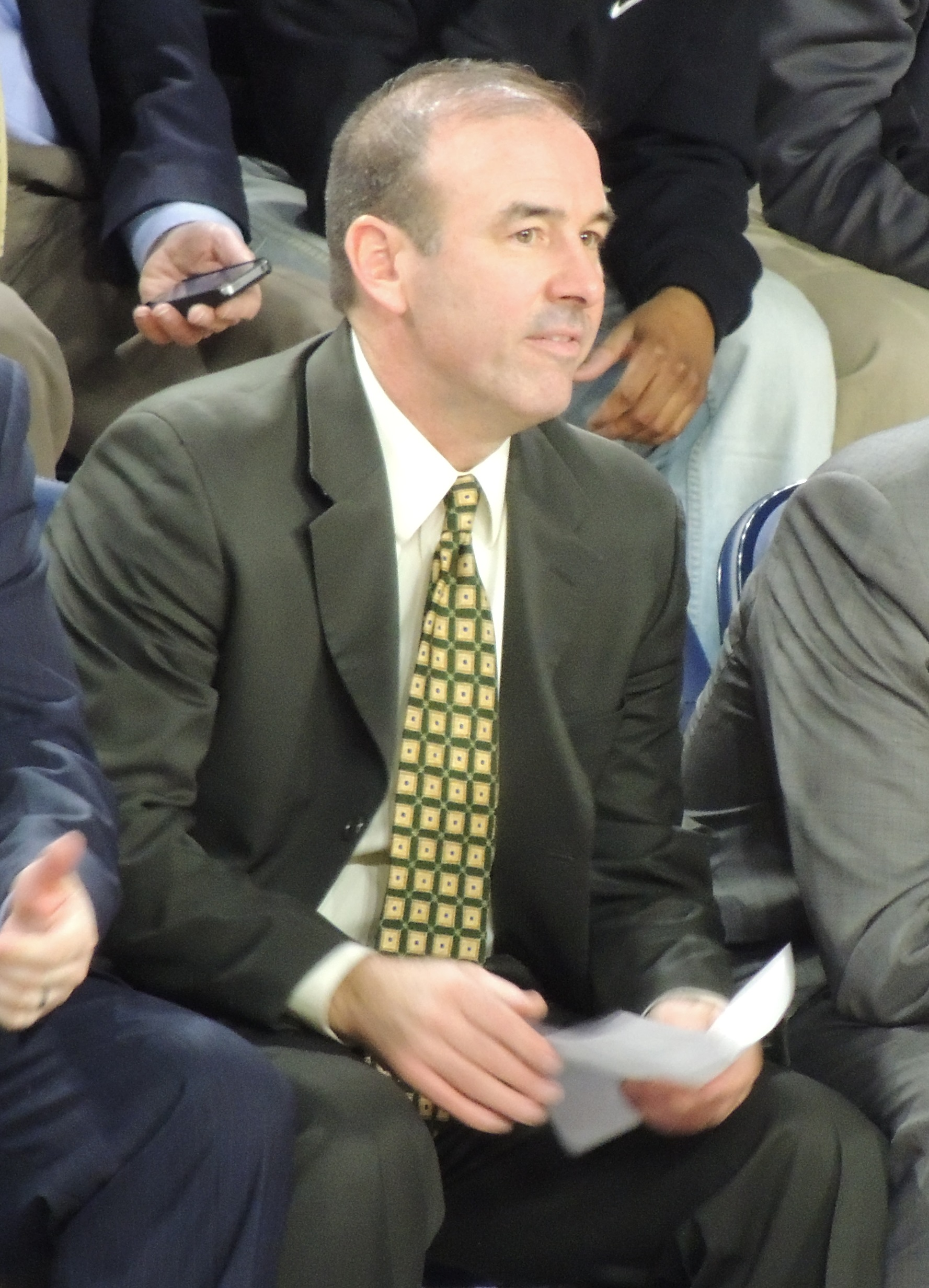
- Lonergan in February, 2015

Biographical details
- Born: January 28, 1966 (age 60); Bowie, Maryland, U.S.

Playing career
- 1984–1988: Catholic
- Position: Point guard

Coaching career (HC unless noted)
- 1988–1989: American International (assistant)
- 1989–1992: Colgate (assistant)
- 1992–2004: Catholic
- 2004–2005: Maryland (assistant)
- 2005–2011: Vermont
- 2011–2016: George Washington

Head coaching record
- Overall: 474–226 (.677)
- Tournaments: 0–2 (NCAA Division I); 13–8 (NCAA Division III); 6–3 (NIT); 1–1 (CBI)

Accomplishments and honors

Championships
- NCAA Division III tournament (2001); NIT (2016); America East tournament (2010); 3 America East regular season (2007, 2009, 2011); 5 CAC tournament (1993, 1998, 2001, 2002, 2004); 9 CAC regular season (1993, 1996, 1998–2004)

Awards
- NCAA Division III Coach of the Year (2001); 4× CAC Coach of the Year (1998, 2000, 2001, 2003); 2× America East Coach of the Year (2007, 2011)

Michael Thomas Lonergan (born January 28, 1966) is the former head coach of the George Washington University Colonials men's basketball team. He replaced Karl Hobbs. He was formerly the coach of the University of Vermont Catamounts and the Catholic University of America (CUA) and before that a point guard for CUA.

== Biography ==
=== Early life and education ===
Lonergan grew up in Bowie, Maryland and attended Archbishop Carroll High School in Washington, D.C. Lonergan's late mother and first coach, Maureen, was coach and athletic director at Bladensburg's Elizabeth Seton High School. His father, Jack, was a successful college baseball player, gaining national attention for pitching a one-hitter for Holy Cross in the 1952 College World Series. Lonergan holds a B.A. in History from CUA and an M.S. in Criminal Justice from American International College.

=== Coaching career ===
In 12 seasons at CUA, Lonergan guided the Cardinals to nine NCAA Tournaments, and an overall record of 251-88, a school-best .740 winning percentage. The Cardinals won seven straight regular-season conference championships (1997–2004). No other college coach in the nation during that time – at any NCAA division – accomplished that feat. Lonergan was recognized for the achievement during the 2004 NCAA Division I Final Four. The team won the 2001 Division III National Championship during that run.

After spending the 2004-05 season as an assistant at University of Maryland, College Park under Gary Williams, where he helped the Terrapins to the NIT Semifinals, Lonergan accepted the head coaching position at the University of Vermont, replacing Tom Brennan. Lonergan coached the Catamounts for six seasons where he averaged 21 wins a year and finished with a career record of 126-68 and .649 winning percentage at UVM, which is the second-highest in school history among coaches with at least 100 career decisions, behind current UVM coach John Becker. In the last six seasons he guided Vermont to four postseason appearances, including a trip to the NCAA Tournament in 2010. He ranks third all-time at UVM in career wins.

In May 2011, Lonergan was hired by George Washington University athletic director and former America East commissioner Patrick Nero to take over as head coach of the Colonials. Early in his tenure, Lonergan highlighted his origins in the Washington, DC metropolitan area and his understanding of Colonials basketball's historical reliance on foreign-born recruits and committed to recruiting locally, nationally and internationally. His first complete recruiting class boasted two players from the DC area and players from Argentina, Greece and Denmark.

The Colonials struggled to consecutive losing records under Lonergan in 2011-12 and 2012–13, marking the first time in his Division I coaching career that a Lonergan-coached team failed to reach the postseason in consecutive seasons. In 2013-14, GW finished the year 24-9, finishing third in the Atlantic 10 and earning a ninth-seed in the NCAA Tournament, where the Colonials lost to Memphis.

Following the trip to the NCAAs, George Washington announced that Lonergan had signed a contract extension that keeps him at GW through the 2020-21 season.

Lonergan completed his fourth season as head coach for men's basketball at George Washington University in 2014-15, leading the Colonials to back-to-back 20-win seasons and postseason appearances for the first time since 2006 and 2007. He guided GW to 22 victories, seventh-most in a season in program history, and a return trip to the postseason with an at-large selection to the National Invitation Tournament. Coach Lonergan helped the Colonials post a 60-54 opening round victory at Pittsburgh for the program's first-ever win in five NIT appearances.

Lonergan led the Colonials to a 5-0 record to open the 2015-16 season, including a noteworthy upset victory over the No. 6 Virginia Cavaliers on November 16, 2015. This was George Washington's first win over an opponent ranked that high since beating No. 1 Massachusetts 78-75 on Feb. 5, 1995. The Colonials would go on to finish the regular season with a 23-10 record, good enough for an NIT invite for a second consecutive season. They would go on to win the NIT Championship Game that season.

In a July 21, 2016 article in the Washington Post, several former players charged Lonergan with "verbal and emotional abuse", charges that Lonergan did not respond to in a statement. The article also noted that three players transferred out of the university after each of the previous four seasons. Later that day, George Washington University announced that it was hiring outside counsel to assist in the investigation of these allegations. Lonergan was fired on September 16, 2016, reportedly on the basis of the allegations. Nearly a year later on September 13, 2017, Lonergan and George Washington officials settled the former coach's legal dispute against the school over his firing. Both sides continue to maintain their initial positions, but per the agreement the settlement cannot be publicly discussed.

On the May 10, 2017 edition of Randy Foye's Outside Shot podcast, guest Jeremy Lin described an incident which alleged that a Vermont coach called Lin, an Asian-American, a racial slur while Lin was playing for Harvard in a game at Vermont in 2006. Lonergan refuted the allegation. On November 18, 2018, Deadspin published a story which detailed the conduct and dismissals of both former George Washington athletic director Patrick Nero and Lonergan along with the tumultuous relationship between the two.

=== Personal life ===
Lonergan and his wife Maggie have five children: John (Jack), Margaret, Michael Jr., Robert (Moe) and Regina. Mike and Maggie met while both working at the basketball camp of legendary DeMatha Catholic High School coach Morgan Wootten. Lonergan has been involved with the Coaches vs. Cancer campaign from the beginning to help raise awareness about the devastating disease which took his mother's life.

== Head coaching record ==
Record table
Season	Team	Overall	Conference	Standing	Postseason
Catholic University Cardinals (Capital Athletic Conference) (1992–2004)
1992–93	Catholic	21–6	11–3	1st	NCAA Division III first round
1993–94	Catholic	9–16	6–6	T–3rd	
1994–95	Catholic	16–10	10–4	2nd	
1995–96	Catholic	19–8	11–2	T–1st	NCAA Division III first round
1996–97	Catholic	12–13	6–8	T–5th	
1997–98	Catholic	25–4	14–0	1st	NCAA Division III Sweet 16
1998–99	Catholic	23–7	12–2	T–1st	NCAA Division III Sweet 16
1999–00	Catholic	24–5	13–1	1st	NCAA Division III Elite Eight
2000–01	Catholic	28–5	11–3	1st	NCAA Division III champion
2001–02	Catholic	26–3	13–1	1st	NCAA Division III Sweet 16
2002–03	Catholic	24–5	13–1	1st	NCAA Division III second round
2003–04	Catholic	24–6	12–2	T–1st	NCAA Division III second round
Catholic:		251–88 (.740)	133–33 (.801)		
Vermont Catamounts (America East Conference) (2005–2011)
2005–06	Vermont	13–17	7–9	T–6th	
2006–07	Vermont	25–8	15–1	1st	NIT first round
2007–08	Vermont	16–15	9–7	T–4th	
2008–09	Vermont	24–9	13–3	T–1st	CBI second round
2009–10	Vermont	25–10	12–4	2nd	NCAA Division I first round
2010–11	Vermont	23–9	13–3	1st	NIT first round
Vermont:		126–68 (.649)	69–27 (.719)		
George Washington Colonials (Atlantic 10 Conference) (2011–2016)
2011–12	George Washington	10–21	5–11	T–11th	
2012–13	George Washington	13–17	7–9	T–11th	
2013–14	George Washington	24–9	11–5	T–3rd	NCAA Division I second round
2014–15	George Washington	22–13	10–8	T–6th	NIT second round
2015–16	George Washington	28–10	11–7	5th	NIT champion
George Washington:		97–70 (.581)	44–39 (.530)		
Total:		474–226 (.677)			
National champion Postseason invitational champion Conference regular season champion Conference regular season and conference tournament champion Division regular season champion Division regular season and conference tournament champion Conference tournament champion
