= 2009–10 Siena Saints men's basketball team =

American college basketball season

2009–10 Siena Saints men's basketball

MAAC Regular Season and Tournament Champions

NCAA tournament, Round of 64
- Conference: Metro Atlantic Athletic Conference
- Record: 27–7 (17–1 MAAC)
- Head coach: Fran McCaffery (5th season)
- Assistant coaches: Mitch Buonaguro; Andrew Francis; Adam Chaskin
- Home arena: Times Union Center

2009–10 MAAC men's basketball standings
	Conf.				Overall
Team	W		L	PCT	W		L	PCT
Siena †	17	–	1	.944	27	–	7	.794
Fairfield	13	–	5	.722	23	–	11	.676
Iona	12	–	6	.667	21	–	10	.677
Saint Peter's	11	–	7	.611	16	–	14	.533
Rider	9	–	9	.500	17	–	16	.515
Niagara	9	–	9	.500	18	–	15	.545
Canisius	8	–	10	.444	15	–	17	.469
Loyola	6	–	12	.333	13	–	17	.433
Manhattan	4	–	14	.222	11	–	20	.355
Marist	1	–	17	.056	1	–	29	.033
† 2010 MAAC tournament winner Rankings from AP Poll

The 2009–10 Siena Saints men's basketball team represented Siena College in the 2009–10 college basketball season. This was head coach Fran McCaffery's fifth season at Siena. The Saints competed in the Metro Atlantic Athletic Conference and played their home games at Times Union Center. They finished the season 27–7, 17–1 in MAAC play to capture the regular season championship. They also won the 2010 MAAC men's basketball tournament for the third consecutive year to earn the conference's automatic bid to the 2010 NCAA Division I men's basketball tournament. They earned a 13 seed in the South Region where they lost to 4 seed and AP #10 Purdue in the first round.

== Preseason ==
In the MAAC preseason poll, released October 27 in Edison, New Jersey, Siena was predicted to finish first in the MAAC.

== Roster ==
#	Name	Height	Weight (lbs.)	Position	Class	Hometown	Previous team(s)
0	Conner Fenlon	6'0"	157	G	So.	Tampa, Florida, U.S.	Tampa Prep
1	O. D. Anosike	6'7"	217	F	Fr.	Staten Island, New York, U.S.	St. Peter's Boys HS
2	Denzel Yard	5'11"	166	G	Fr.	Philadelphia, Pennsylvania, U.S.	Franklin Learning Center
3	Kyle Downey	6'2"	203	G	So.	Fairport, New York, U.S.	Fairport
4	Just-in'love Smith	5'11"	190	G	Sr.	East Greenbush, New York, U.S.	Columbia HS
5	Kyle Griffin	6'3"	198	G	So.	Allentown, Pennsylvania, U.S.	Germantown Academy; La Salle
13	Clarence Jackson	6'3"	185	G	Jr.	Marlton, New Jersey, U.S.	Cherokee
21	Davis Martens	6'9"	220	F	Fr.	Cologne, Germany	The Patterson School
22	Ryan Rossiter	6'9"	234	F	Jr.	Staten Island, New York, U.S.	Monsignor Farrell HS
23	Edwin Ubiles	6'6"	204	G F	Sr.	Poughkeepsie, New York, U.S.	St. Thomas More HS
25	Ronald Moore	6'0"	156	G	Sr.	Conshohocken, Pennsylvania, U.S.	Plymouth-Whitemarsh HS
31	Owen Wignot	6'5"	210	F	So.	Wilkes-Barre, Pennsylvania, U.S.	Holy Redeemer HS
32	Jonathan Breeden	5'11"	163	G	Fr.	Harrisburg, Pennsylvania, U.S.	Central Dauphin East HS
42	Alex Franklin	6'5"	226	F	Sr.	Reading, Pennsylvania, U.S.	Central Catholic HS
43	Steven Priestley	6'5"	241	F	Jr.	Baldwin, New York, U.S.	Uniondale HS
	Brandon Walters	6'5"	226	C	Jr.	Brooklyn, New York, U.S.	Abraham Lincoln HS; Seton Hall University

=== Coaching staff ===
Name	Position	Year at Siena	Alma Mater (Year)
Fran McCaffery	Head coach	5th	Pennsylvania (1982)
Mitch Buonaguro	Assistant coach	5th	Boston College (1975)
Andrew Francis	Assistant coach	3rd	LIU-Southampton (1998)
Adam Chaskin	Assistant coach	5th	Michigan (1992)
Cory Magee	Student assistant coach	1st	Siena (2010)
David Matturro	Director of basketball operations	2nd	St. John Fisher (2006)

== Schedule and results ==
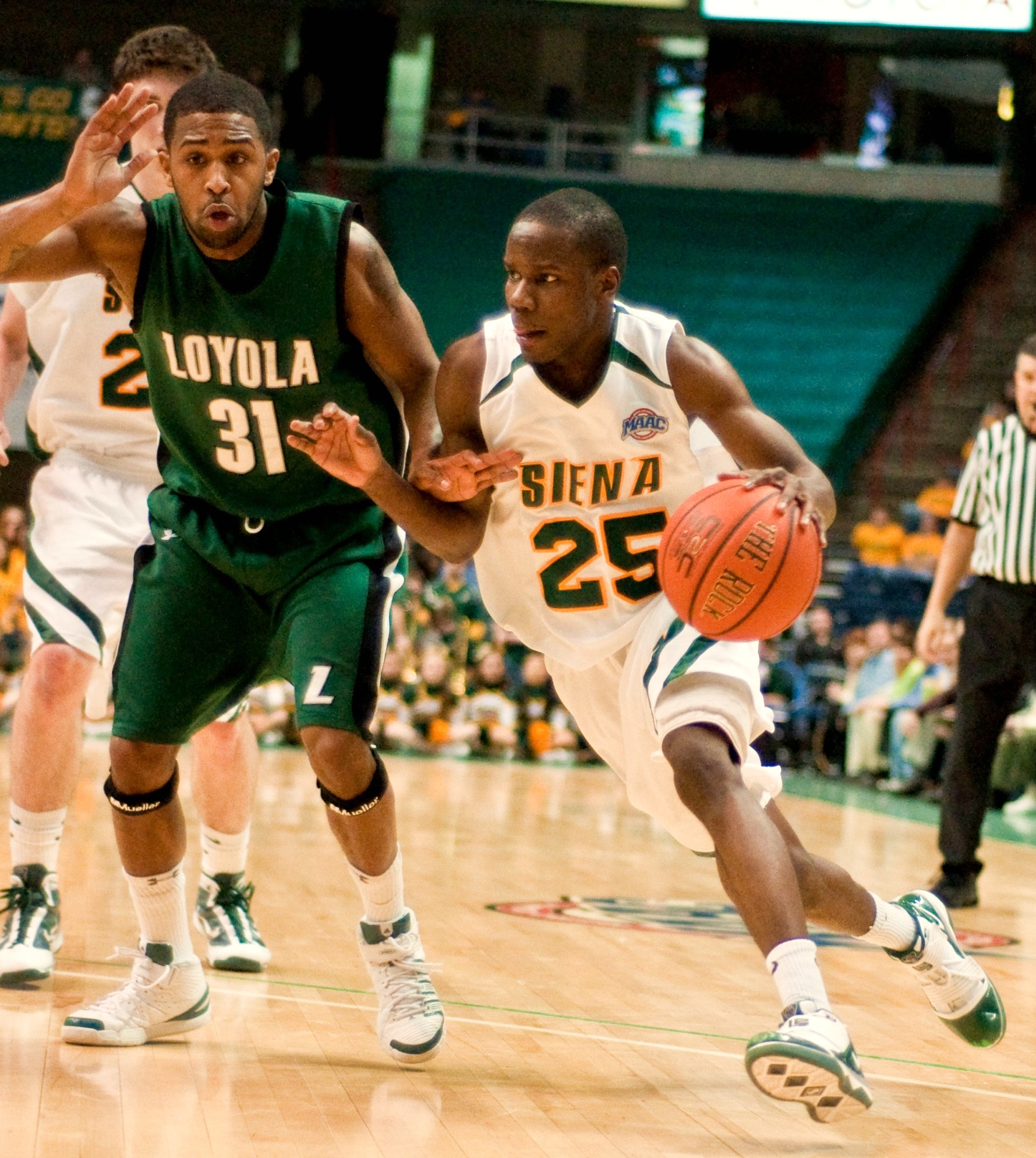
Siena guard Ronald Moore dribbles toward the basket in a game against Loyola in January 2010.

- All times are Eastern

Date time, TV	Rank^{#}	Opponent^{#}	Result	Record	Site (attendance) city, state
Regular Season
11/13/2009*; 8:00pm		at Tennessee State	W 85–69	1–0	Gentry Center (2,139); Nashville, Tennessee
11/17/2009*; 12:00pm, ESPN		Northeastern	W 59–53	2–0	Times Union Center (6,445); Albany, New York
11/21/2009*; 7:00pm		at Temple; Philly Hoop Group Classic	L 73–69	2–1	Liacouras Center (6,759); Philadelphia, Pennsylvania
11/24/2009*; 7:00pm		Delaware; Philly Hoop Group Classic	W 90–56	3–1	Times Union Center (7,437); Albany, New York
11/27/2009*; 5:30pm		vs. St. John's; Philly Hoop Group Classic	L 77–68	3–2	The Palestra (NA); Philadelphia, Pennsylvania
11/28/2009*; 4:00pm		vs. Brown; Philly Hoop Group Classic	W 99–79	4–2	The Palestra (NA); Philadelphia, Pennsylvania
12/2/2009*; 7:00pm		at Georgia Tech	L 74–61	4–3	Alexander Memorial Coliseum (6,898); Atlanta, Georgia
12/5/2009*; 7:30pm		Albany	W 83–54	5–3	Times Union Center (12,960); Albany, New York
12/7/2009; 7:30pm		at Iona	W 73–60	6–3 (1–0)	Hynes Center (2,130); New Rochelle, New York
12/12/2009*; 8:05pm		at Northern Iowa	L 82–65	6–4	McLeod Center (5,096); Cedar Falls, Iowa
12/23/2009; 7:00pm		Rider	W 84–62	7–4 (2–0)	Times Union Center (6,672); Albany, New York
12/29/2009*; 7:00pm		Saint Joseph's	W 92–75	8–4	Times Union Center (7,998); Albany, New York
12/31/2009; 4:00pm		Saint Peter's	W 64–53	9–4 (3–0)	Times Union Center (6,081); Albany, New York
1/2/2010*; 7:00pm		Mount St. Mary's	W 79–76 ^{OT}	10–4	Times Union Center (6,516); Albany, New York
1/4/2010; 7:00pm		at Loyola	W 76–56	11–4 (4–0)	Reitz Arena (852); Baltimore, Maryland
1/9/2010; 1:00pm		Niagara	W 83–65	12–4 (5–0)	Times Union Center (8,065); Albany, New York
1/11/2010; 7:00pm, TW3		Canisius	W 82–70	13–4 (6–0)	Times Union Center (5,889); Albany, New York
1/16/2010; 4:00pm, TW3		at Fairfield	W 81–73	14–4 (7–0)	Arena at Harbor Yard (3,384); Bridgeport, Connecticut
1/18/2010; 7:00pm		Manhattan	W 83–68	15–4 (8–0)	Times Union Center (7,632); Albany, New York
1/21/2010; 7:00pm, TW3		Loyola	W 67–61	16–4 (9–0)	Times Union Center (6,653); Albany, New York
1/24/2010; 2:00pm		at Manhattan	W 66–58	17–4 (10–0)	Draddy Gymnasium (1,452); Riverdale, New York
1/28/2010; 7:00pm		at Saint Peter's	W 66–58	18–4 (11–0)	Yanitelli Center (1,609); Jersey City, New Jersey
1/30/2010; 4:00pm, MSG		at Marist	W 79–60	19–4 (12–0)	McCann Field House (2,858); Poughkeepsie, New York
2/5/2010; 7:00pm, TW1		Iona	W 88–68	20–4 (13–0)	Times Union Center (8,065); Albany, New York
2/8/2010; 7:00pm, MSG		Fairfield	W 69–67	21–4 (14–0)	Times Union Center (7,184); Albany, New York
2/12/2010; 7:00pm, ESPN2		at Niagara	L 87–74	21–5 (14–1)	Gallagher Center (2,310); Lewiston, New York
2/14/2010; 7:00pm, TW3		at Canisius	W 74–57	22–5 (15–1)	Koessler Athletic Center (1,504); Buffalo, New York
2/20/2010*; 11:00am, ESPN2		at No. 18 Butler; ESPN Bracket Busters	L 70–53	22–6	Hinkle Fieldhouse (9,111); Indianapolis, Indiana
2/26/2010; 7:00pm, ESPNU		at Rider	W 80–54	23–6 (16–1)	Alumni Gymnasium (1,650); Lawrenceville, New Jersey
2/28/2010; 4:00pm, TW3		at Marist	W 76–51	24–6 (17–1)	Times Union Center (8,065); Albany, New York
2010 MAAC men's basketball tournament
3/6/2010; 5:25pm, MSG		Manhattan; Quarterfinals	W 78–61	25–6	Times Union Center (8,914); Albany, New York
3/7/2010; 4:00pm, MSG		Rider; Semifinals	W 72–62	26–6	Times Union Center (8,250); Albany, New York
3/8/2010; 7:00pm, ESPN2		Fairfield; Finals	W 72–65 ^{OT}	27–6	Times Union Center (10,679); Albany, New York
2010 NCAA Division I men's basketball tournament
3/19/2010*; 2:30pm, CBS		vs. No. 10 Purdue; First Round	L 72–64	27–7	Spokane Arena (10,899); Spokane, Washington
*Non-conference game. ^{#}Rankings from AP Poll. (#) Tournament seedings in parentheses.
