= 2009–10 Boston University Terriers men's basketball team =

American college basketball season

2009–10 Boston University Terriers men's basketball

CBI, Semifinals
- Conference: America East Conference
- Record: 21–14 (11–5 AE)
- Head coach: Patrick Chambers (1st season)
- Associate head coach: Orlando Vandross (3rd season)
- Assistant coaches: Ross Condon (1st season); Brian Daly (1st season)
- Home arena: Agganis Arena; Case Gym

2009–10 America East men's basketball standings
	Conf.				Overall
Team	W		L	PCT	W		L	PCT
Stony Brook	13	–	3	.813	22	–	10	.688
Vermont †	12	–	4	.750	25	–	10	.714
Maine	11	–	5	.688	19	–	11	.633
Boston University	11	–	5	.688	21	–	14	.600
Binghamton	8	–	8	.500	13	–	18	.419
Hartford	6	–	10	.375	8	–	22	.267
New Hampshire	6	–	10	.375	13	–	17	.433
UMBC	3	–	13	.188	4	–	26	.133
Albany	2	–	14	.125	7	–	25	.219
† 2010 America East tournament winner As of March 19, 2010; Rankings from AP Poll

The 2009–10 Boston University Terriers men's basketball team represented Boston University in the 2009–10 NCAA Division I men's basketball season. The Terriers were led by head coach Patrick Chambers in his first year leading the team after being hired as head coach in April of 2009. Boston University played their home games at Agganis Arena and Case Gym in Boston, Massachusetts, as members of the America East Conference.

The Terriers finished conference play with an 11–5 record, earning the fourth seed in the America East tournament. Boston University made a run to the America East Championship game, but were defeated in the title game by Vermont.

Boston University failed to qualify for the NCAA tournament, but were invited to the 2010 College Basketball Invitational. The Terriers won their first two games in the CBI, earning their first postseason victories since 1959 and advancing to the semifinals of the CBI. They were eliminated by eventual tournament champion VCU, 88–75.

The Terriers finished the season with a 21–14 record.

== Roster ==
2009–10 Boston University Terriers men's basketball team
Players
Coaches

Pos.	#	Name	Height	Weight	Year	Hometown
G	1	Darryl Partin	6 ft 6 in (1.98 m)	190 lb (86 kg)	Jr	Seattle, Washington
G	2	Matt Griffin	5 ft 10 in (1.78 m)	180 lb (82 kg)	Jr	Narberth, Pennsylvania
G	3	Michael Schulze	6 ft 0 in (1.83 m)	185 lb (84 kg)	Sr	Townsend, Massachusetts
G	13	Corey Lowe	6 ft 2 in (1.88 m)	200 lb (91 kg)	Sr	Newton, Massachusetts
F	14	Patrick Hazel	6 ft 6 in (1.98 m)	220 lb (100 kg)	Jr	Jamaica, New York
F	15	Valdas Sirutis	6 ft 7 in (2.01 m)	215 lb (98 kg)	Sr	Gargždai, Lithuania
G	20	Tunde Agboola	6 ft 4 in (1.93 m)	197 lb (89 kg)	Sr	Springfield, Massachusetts
F	21	Jake O'Brien	6 ft 8 in (2.03 m)	220 lb (100 kg)	So	Weymouth, Massachusetts
G	22	Carlos Strong	6 ft 3 in (1.91 m)	215 lb (98 kg)	Sr	Portland, Maine
G/F	23	John Holland	6 ft 5 in (1.96 m)	205 lb (93 kg)	Jr	The Bronx, New York
G	24	Tyler Morris	6 ft 2 in (1.88 m)	190 lb (86 kg)	Sr	Indianapolis, Indiana
F	25	Brendan Sullivan	6 ft 7 in (2.01 m)	205 lb (93 kg)	Sr	Darien, Connecticut
F	31	Scott Brittain	6 ft 9 in (2.06 m)	221 lb (100 kg)	Sr	Oakville, Ontario, Canada
C	32	Jeff Pelage	6 ft 8 in (2.03 m)	240 lb (109 kg)	So	Pompano Beach, Florida
G/F	34	Sherrod Smith	6 ft 4 in (1.93 m)	185 lb (84 kg)	Sr	Milwaukee, Wisconsin
F	43	Chris Kurz	6 ft 8 in (2.03 m)	210 lb (95 kg)	So	Philadelphia, Pennsylvania

Head coach

- Patrick Chambers (Philadelphia)

Assistant coach(es)

- Orlando Vandross (American International)
- Ross Condon (Villanova)
- Brian Daly (Saint Joseph's)

Legend

- (C) Team captain
- (S) Suspended
- (I) Ineligible
- (W) Walk-on
- Injured
- Current redshirt

Roster
Last update: February 7, 2023

== Schedule and results ==
Date time, TV	Rank^{#}	Opponent^{#}	Result	Record	Site (attendance) city, state
Regular season
November 13, 2009*; 7:30 pm		at Iona	L 73–82	0–1	Hynes Athletics Center (2,110); New Rochelle, NY
November 17, 2009*; 7:00 pm, NESN		George Washington	L 59–69	0–2	Agganis Arena (2,149); Boston, MA
November 19, 2009*; 7:30 pm		vs. Kansas State; Puerto Rico Tip-Off	L 70–80	0–3	Coliseo de Puerto Rico (5,073); San Juan, Puerto Rico
November 20, 2009*; 6:00 pm		vs. Indiana; Puerto Rico Tip-Off	W 71–67	1–3	Coliseo de Puerto Rico (5,762); San Juan, Puerto Rico
November 22, 2009*; 12:30 pm, ESPNU		vs. No. 21 Georgia Tech; Puerto Rico Tip-Off	L 67–85	1–4	Coliseo de Puerto Rico (8,357); San Juan, Puerto Rico
November 25, 2009*; 7:00 pm		Northeastern	W 69–64 ^{OT}	2–4	Case Gym (575); Boston, MA
November 29, 2009*; 5:00 pm		Harvard	L 70–78	2–5	Case Gym (650); Boston, MA
December 2, 2009*; 7:00 pm, SNY/WCTX		at No. 14 Connecticut	L 64–92	2–6	XL Center (11,502); Hartford, CT
December 6, 2009*; 2:00 pm		Bucknell	W 63–53	3–6	Agganis Arena (1,227); Boston, MA
December 12, 2009*; 2:00 pm		at Marist	W 88–72	4–6	McCann Arena (1,935); Poughkeepsie, NY
December 22, 2009*; 7:00 pm		Mount St. Mary's	W 86–77	5–6	Case Gym (397); Boston, MA
December 29, 2009*; 7:00 pm		at Dayton	L 60–74	5–7	UD Arena (13,435); Dayton, OH
January 2, 2010; 12:00 pm, NESN		Stony Brook	L 75–84	5–8 (0–1)	Case Gym (547); Boston, MA
January 7, 2010; 7:00 pm		at New Hampshire	W 60–56	6–8 (1–1)	Lundholm Gym (624); Durham, NH
January 9, 2010; 12:00 pm		at Hartford	W 84–70	7–8 (2–1)	Chase Arena at Reich Family Pavilion (1,079); West Hartford, CT
January 12, 2010; 7:00 pm		UMBC	W 75–63	8–8 (3–1)	Case Gym (560); Boston, MA
January 14, 2010; 7:00 pm		at Binghamton	W 63–55	9–8 (4–1)	Binghamton University Events Center (2,944); Vestal, NY
January 17, 2010; 2:00 pm, ESPNU		at Vermont	L 58–78	9–9 (4–2)	Patrick Gym (3,266); Burlington, VT
January 19, 2010; 7:00 pm		Albany	W 79–58	10–9 (5–2)	Agganis Arena (1,548); Boston, MA
January 24, 2010; 1:00 pm		at UMBC	W 79–61	11–9 (6–2)	Retriever Activities Center (1,355); Catonsville, MD
January 27, 2010; 7:30 pm		at Maine	L 54–56	11–10 (6–3)	Alfond Arena (1,546); Orono, ME
January 30, 2010; 7:00 pm		at Stony Brook	L 55–71	11–11 (6–4)	Pritchard Gymnasium (1,595); Stony Brook, NY
February 4, 2010; 7:00 pm, CSN		New Hampshire	W 69–47	12–11 (7–4)	Agganis Arena (1,091); Boston, MA
February 6, 2010; 7:00 pm, TW3		at Albany	W 68–53	13–11 (8–4)	SEFCU Arena (4,410); Albany, NY
February 9, 2010; 7:00 pm, CSN		Vermont	L 75–76	13–12 (8–5)	Agganis Arena (968); Boston, MA
February 13, 2010; 4:00 pm, CSN		Hartford	W 58–55	14–12 (9–5)	Case Gym (714); Boston, MA
February 17, 2010; 7:30 pm		Binghamton	W 93–51	15–12 (10–5)	Agganis Arena (1,477); Boston, MA
February 20, 2010*; 2:00 pm		at Delaware; ESPN BracketBusters	W 78–65	16–12	Bob Carpenter Center (2,513); Newark, DE
February 27, 2010; 2:30 pm		Maine	W 76–56	17–12 (11–5)	Case Gym (1,007); Boston, MA
America East tournament
March 6, 2010; 2:15 pm	(4)	at (5) Hartford; AE Quarterfinals	W 87–46	18–12	Chase Arena at Reich Family Pavilion (2,802); West Hartford, CT
March 7, 2010; 5:00 pm	(4)	vs. (1) Stony Brook; AE Semifinals	W 70–63	19–12	Chase Arena at Reich Family Pavilion (2,440); West Hartford, CT
March 13, 2010; 12:00 pm, ESPN2	(4)	at (2) Vermont; AE Championship Game	L 70–83	19–13	Patrick Gym (3,266); Burlington, VT
CBI
March 17, 2010; 10:00 pm		at Oregon State; CBI First Round	W 96–78	20–13	Gill Coliseum (2,913); Corvallis, OR
March 22, 2010; 7:00 pm		Morehead State; CBI Quarterfinals	W 91–89 ^{OT}	21–13	Case Gym (640); Boston, MA
March 24, 2010; 7:00 pm, HDNet		at VCU; CBI Semifinals	L 75–88	21–14	Siegel Center (3,352); Richmond, VA
*Non-conference game. ^{#}Rankings from AP Poll. (#) Tournament seedings in parentheses. All times are in Eastern Time. Source
