= 2010 Ohio Valley Conference men's basketball tournament =

- 2010 tournament logo
- Classification: Division I
- Season: 2009–10
- Teams: 8
- First round site: campus sites
- Semifinals site: Bridgestone Arena; Nashville, Tennessee
- Finals site: Bridgestone Arena; Nashville, Tennessee
- Champions: Murray State (14th title)
- Winning coach: Billy Kennedy (1st title)
- MVP: Isaiah Canaan (Murray State)
- Television: ESPNU, ESPN2

2009–10 Ohio Valley Conference men's basketball standings
	Conf.				Overall
Team	W		L	PCT	W		L	PCT
Murray State †	17	–	1	.944	31	–	5	.861
Morehead State	15	–	3	.833	24	–	11	.686
Eastern Illinois	11	–	7	.611	19	–	12	.613
Austin Peay	11	–	7	.611	17	–	15	.531
Eastern Kentucky	11	–	7	.611	20	–	12	.625
Tennessee Tech	8	–	10	.444	15	–	17	.469
Jacksonville State	7	–	11	.389	11	–	19	.367
Tennessee State	6	–	12	.333	9	–	23	.281
Southeast Missouri State	3	–	15	.167	7	–	23	.233
UT Martin	1	–	17	.056	4	–	25	.138
† 2010 OVC tournament winner As of March 22, 2010; Rankings from AP Poll

The 2010 Ohio Valley Conference men's basketball tournament took place March 2, 5, and 6, 2010. The first round was hosted by the better seed in each game, and the semifinals and finals took place at Bridgestone Arena in Nashville, Tennessee. The tournament was won by the #1 seed Murray State, who received an automatic berth in the 2010 NCAA tournament.

== Format ==
The top eight eligible men's basketball teams in the Ohio Valley Conference receive a berth in the conference tournament. After the 20 game conference season, teams are seeded by conference record. The winner earns an automatic berth in the 2010 NCAA tournament. Had #1 seed Murray State failed to win the tournament, they would have received an automatic bid to the 2010 NIT.

== Seeds ==
Only eight Ohio Valley schools will play in the tournament. Teams are seeded by conference record, with a tiebreaker system to seed teams with identical conference records.

Through games of Feb. 17, 2010, the seeds would be as follows after implementing tiebreakers:

Seed	School	Conf (Overall)	Tiebreaker
#1	Murray State	16–0 (25–3)	
#2	Morehead State	13–3 (19–8)	
#3	Eastern Kentucky	10–6 (18–10)	1–1 vs. APSU; 1–1 vs. EIU
#4	Austin Peay	9–6 (15–12)	1–1 vs. EKU; 1–0 vs. EIU
#5	Eastern Illinois	9–7 (15–11)	1–1 vs. EKU; 0–1 vs. APSU
#6	Tennessee Tech	7–9 (13–14)	1–0 TTU
#7	Jacksonville State	7–10 (11–16)	0–1 vs. TTU
#8	Tennessee State	5–11 (8–20)	
	Southeast Missouri State	3–13 (7–20)	
	Tennessee-Martin	1–15 (4–22)	

== Bracket ==
Quarterfinals; March 2
1	Murray State	84
8	Tennessee State	51
4	Eastern Illinois	68
5	Eastern Kentucky	61
3	Austin Peay	65
6	Tennessee Tech	68
2	Morehead State	87
7	Jacksonville State	54

Semifinals; March 5
1	Murray State	55
4	Eastern Illinois	51
6	Tennessee Tech	47
2	Morehead State	76

Finals; March 6
1	Murray State	62
2	Morehead State	51
