= 2009–10 Eastern Kentucky Colonels basketball team =

American college basketball season

2009–10 Eastern Kentucky Colonels basketball
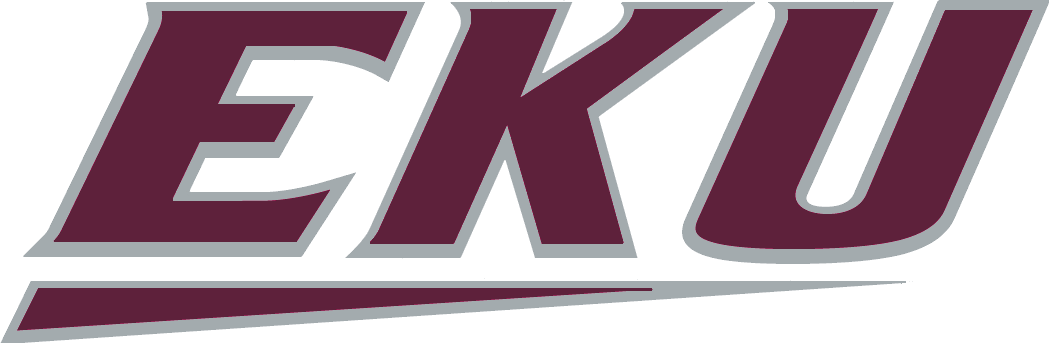

CBI, First Round
- Conference: Ohio Valley Conference
- Record: 20–13 (11–7 OVC)
- Head coach: Jeff Neubauer (5th season)
- Assistant coaches: Ted Hotaling (5th season); Josh Merkel (5th season); Everick Sullivan (2nd season)
- Home arena: McBrayer Arena

2009–10 Ohio Valley Conference men's basketball standings
	Conf.				Overall
Team	W		L	PCT	W		L	PCT
Murray State †	17	–	1	.944	31	–	5	.861
Morehead State	15	–	3	.833	24	–	11	.686
Eastern Illinois	11	–	7	.611	19	–	12	.613
Austin Peay	11	–	7	.611	17	–	15	.531
Eastern Kentucky	11	–	7	.611	20	–	12	.625
Tennessee Tech	8	–	10	.444	15	–	17	.469
Jacksonville State	7	–	11	.389	11	–	19	.367
Tennessee State	6	–	12	.333	9	–	23	.281
Southeast Missouri State	3	–	15	.167	7	–	23	.233
UT Martin	1	–	17	.056	4	–	25	.138
† 2010 OVC tournament winner As of March 22, 2010; Rankings from AP Poll

The 2009–10 Eastern Kentucky Colonels basketball team represented Eastern Kentucky University in the 2009–10 NCAA Division I men's basketball season. The Colonels were led by head coach Jeff Neubauer in his fifth year leading the team. Eastern Kentucky played their home games at McBrayer Arena in Richmond, Kentucky, as members of the Ohio Valley Conference.

The Colonels finished conference play with an 11–7 record, earning the fifth seed in the Ohio Valley tournament. Eastern Kentucky lost in the first round of the OVC tournament to Eastern Illinois.

Eastern Kentucky failed to qualify for the NCAA tournament, but were invited to the 2010 College Basketball Invitational. The Colonels were eliminated by College of Charleston, 82–79.

The Colonels finished the season with a 20–13 record.

== Roster ==
2009–10 Eastern Kentucky Colonels men's basketball team
Players
Coaches

Pos.	#	Name	Height	Weight	Year	Hometown
G	1	Willie Cruz	6 ft 4 in (1.93 m)	203 lb (92 kg)	Fr	Rochester, New York
G	3	Robin Mestdagh	6 ft 4 in (1.93 m)	192 lb (87 kg)	Sr	Ieper, Belgium
G	4	Antonio Gilkey	6 ft 0 in (1.83 m)	168 lb (76 kg)	Jr	Louisville, Kentucky
G	5	Joshua Jones	6 ft 4 in (1.93 m)	185 lb (84 kg)	So	Indianapolis, Indiana
G	10	Mike Lewis	5 ft 7 in (1.7 m)	140 lb (64 kg)	So	Upper Marlboro, Maryland
G	11	Papa Oppong	6 ft 4 in (1.93 m)	180 lb (82 kg)	Sr	Toronto, Ontario, Canada
F	21	Cordaro Ellis	6 ft 8 in (2.03 m)	231 lb (105 kg)	So	Lynchburg, Virginia
G	22	Josh Daniel	6 ft 5 in (1.96 m)	200 lb (91 kg)	RS Jr	Charleston, West Virginia
G	23	Dayvon Ellis	6 ft 0 in (1.83 m)	178 lb (81 kg)	Sr	Elgin, Illinois
F	24	Josh Taylor	6 ft 6 in (1.98 m)	245 lb (111 kg)	Sr	Pittsburgh, Pennsylvania
G	31	Justin Stommes	6 ft 7 in (2.01 m)	200 lb (91 kg)	Jr	Cold Spring, Minnesota
F	32	Spencer Perrin	6 ft 5 in (1.96 m)	185 lb (84 kg)	Jr	Danville, Kentucky

Head coach

- Jeff Neubauer (La Salle)

Assistant coach(es)

- Ted Hotaling (Albany)
- Josh Merkel (Salisbury)
- Everick Sullivan (Louisville)

Legend

- (C) Team captain
- (S) Suspended
- (I) Ineligible
- (W) Walk-on
- Injured
- Current redshirt

Roster
Last update: February 16, 2023

== Schedule and results ==
Date time, TV	Rank^{#}	Opponent^{#}	Result	Record	Site (attendance) city, state
Regular season
November 14, 2009*; 8:00 pm		West Virginia Wesleyan	W 102–71	1–0	McBrayer Arena (4,700); Richmond, KY
November 19, 2009*; 7:00 pm, CBSSports.com		at Pittsburgh; CBE Classic	L 60–71	1–1	Petersen Events Center (9,148); Pittsburgh, PA
November 23, 2009*; 6:00 pm		Fairleigh Dickinson; CBE Classic	W 68–39	2–1	McBrayer Arena (1,700); Richmond, KY
November 24, 2009*; 6:00 pm		UC Irvine; CBE Classic	W 67–57	3–1	McBrayer Arena (1,350); Richmond, KY
November 25, 2009*; 6:00 pm		UTSA; CBE Classic	W 74–72	4–1	McBrayer Arena (1,100); Richmond, KY
November 28, 2009*; 7:00 pm		FIU	W 81–67	5–1	McBrayer Arena (1,200); Richmond, KY
December 3, 2009; 7:00 pm, ESPNU		at Murray State	L 60–62	5–2 (0–1)	Regional Special Events Center (3,984); Murray, KY
December 5, 2009; 7:00 pm		at UT Martin	W 85–74	6–2 (1–1)	Skyhawk Arena (2,216); Martin, TN
December 9, 2009*; 7:00 pm		Ohio Valley	W 74–58	7–2	McBrayer Arena (2,700); Richmond, KY
December 12, 2009*; 4:30 pm, Comcast SportsNet		at Maryland	L 72–83	7–3	Comcast Center (16,183); College Park, MD
December 19, 2009*; 2:30 pm		at Ohio	L 62–74	7–4	Convocation Center (3,714); Athens, OH
December 29, 2009*; 6:00 pm		vs. Morgan State; Dr. Pepper Classic	W 76–62	8–4	McKenzie Arena (3,116); Chattanooga, TN
December 30, 2009*; 8:00 pm		at Chattanooga; Dr. Pepper Classic	L 54–68	8–5	McKenzie Arena (3,063); Chattanooga, TN
January 2, 2010; 7:00 pm		Tennessee State	W 79–71	9–5 (2–1)	McBrayer Arena (1,150); Richmond, KY
January 4, 2010; 7:30 pm		Austin Peay	W 76–71	10–5 (3–1)	McBrayer Arena (1,450); Richmond, KY
January 7, 2010; 6:30 pm		at Jacksonville State	L 65–68	10–6 (3–2)	Pete Mathews Coliseum (738); Jacksonville, AL
January 9, 2010; 8:30 pm		at Tennessee Tech	W 78–73	11–6 (4–2)	Eblen Center (1,041); Cookeville, TN
January 14, 2010; 7:30 pm		Eastern Illinois	W 67–59	12–6 (5–2)	McBrayer Arena (3,100); Richmond, KY
January 16, 2010; 7:00 pm		Southeast Missouri State	W 79–63	13–6 (6–2)	McBrayer Arena (2,400); Richmond, KY
January 19, 2010*; 7:00 pm		Chicago State	W 74–50	14–6	McBrayer Arena (2,050); Richmond, KY
January 23, 2010; 7:00 pm, Wazoo Sports		Morehead State	L 53–69	14–7 (6–3)	McBrayer Arena (5,600); Richmond, KY
January 28, 2010; 8:30 pm		at Austin Peay	L 76–80	14–8 (6–4)	Dunn Center (3,017); Clarksville, TN
January 31, 2010; 6:00 pm		at Tennessee State	W 75–58	15–8 (7–4)	Gentry Complex (518); Nashville, TN
February 4, 2010; 7:30 pm		Tennessee Tech	W 76–58	16–8 (8–4)	McBrayer Arena (2,200); Richmond, KY
February 6, 2010; 7:00 pm		Jacksonville State	W 66–65	17–8 (9–4)	McBrayer Arena (1,800); Richmond, KY
February 11, 2010; 8:45 pm		at Southeast Missouri State	W 59–56	18–8 (10–4)	Show Me Center (2,490); Cape Girardeau, MO
February 13, 2010; 7:00 pm		at Eastern Illinois	L 54–77	18–9 (10–5)	Lantz Arena (1,011); Charleston, IL
February 17, 2010; 7:00 pm		at Morehead State	L 64–77	18–10 (10–6)	Ellis Johnson Arena (5,290); Morehead, KY
February 20, 2010*; 7:00 pm		Winthrop; ESPN BracketBusters	W 77–57	19–10	McBrayer Arena (1,150); Richmond, KY
February 25, 2010; 7:30 pm		UT Martin	W 84–60	20–10 (11–6)	McBrayer Arena (1,200); Richmond, KY
February 27, 2010; 7:00 pm		Murray State	L 74–88	20–11 (11–7)	McBrayer Arena (4,800); Richmond, KY
Ohio Valley tournament
March 2, 2010; 8:30 pm	(5)	at (4) Eastern Illinois; OVC Quarterfinals	L 61–68	20–12	Lantz Arena (1,174); Charleston, IL
CBI
March 17, 2010; 7:00 pm		College of Charleston; CBI First Round	L 79–82	20–13	McBrayer Arena (1,750); Richmond, KY
*Non-conference game. ^{#}Rankings from AP Poll. (#) Tournament seedings in parentheses. All times are in Eastern Time. Source
