= Isaiah Canaan =

American basketball player (born 1991)

- Canaan with Trabzonspor in 2026

Free agent
- Position: Point guard

Personal information
- Born: May 21, 1991 (age 35) Biloxi, Mississippi, U.S.
- Listed height: 6 ft 0 in (1.83 m)
- Listed weight: 201 lb (91 kg)

Career information
- High school: Biloxi (Biloxi, Mississippi)
- College: Murray State (2009–2013)
- NBA draft: 2013: 2nd round, 34th overall pick
- Drafted by: Houston Rockets
- Playing career: 2013–present

Career history
- 2013–2015: Houston Rockets
- 2013–2015: →Rio Grande Valley Vipers
- 2015–2016: Philadelphia 76ers
- 2016–2017: Chicago Bulls
- 2017: Houston Rockets
- 2017: Northern Arizona Suns
- 2017–2018: Phoenix Suns
- 2019: Minnesota Timberwolves
- 2019: Milwaukee Bucks
- 2019–2020: Stockton Kings
- 2020–2022: UNICS Kazan
- 2022: Galatasaray
- 2022–2024: Olympiacos
- 2024–2026: Crvena zvezda
- 2026: Trabzonspor

Career highlights
- Greek League champion (2023); 2× Greek Cup winner (2023, 2024); Serbian Cup winner (2025); 2× Greek Supercup winner (2022, 2023); Greek All-Star Game MVP (2023); Greek All-Star (2023); NBA D-League All-Star (2014); Consensus second-team All-American (2012); 2× OVC Player of the Year (2012, 2013); 3× First-team All-OVC (2011–2013); OVC Freshman of the Year (2010); No. 3 retired by Murray State Racers
- Stats at NBA.com
- Stats at Basketball Reference

Isaiah Andre Canaan (pronounced Cannon; born May 21, 1991) is an American professional basketball player who last played for Trabzonspor of the Basketbol Süper Ligi (BSL). He was an All-American college player for the Murray State Racers.

== College career ==
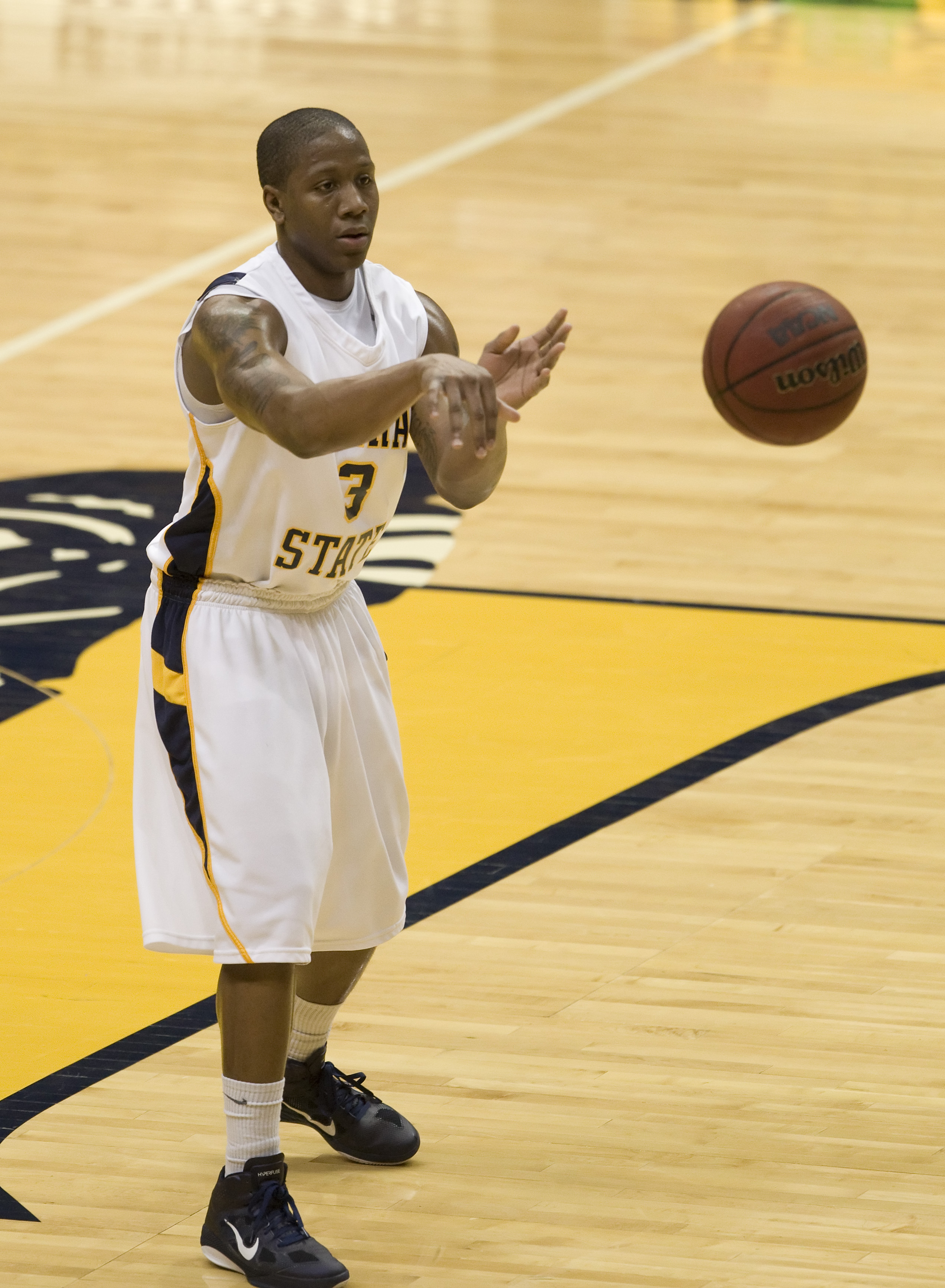
Canaan at Murray State

Canaan, a 6'0" guard from Biloxi, Mississippi, went to Murray State after leading Biloxi High School to the 5A Mississippi state championship as a senior. Canaan had an instant impact for the Racers, as he averaged 10.4 points per game and led the Racers in three-point percentage at .485 as a freshman in the 2009–10 season. He was named 2010 Ohio Valley Conference (OVC) freshman of the year as the Racers went 17–1 in OVC play, winning the league. They also won the 2010 OVC tournament. Canaan was named tournament MVP as he scored 16 points off the bench for the Racers in the final. Murray State went on to knock off 4-seeded Vanderbilt in the NCAA tournament, before losing to eventual national runner-up Butler 54–52 in the second round.

In his sophomore year, Canaan raised his scoring average to 11.7 points per game and was named to the first team All-OVC team. He led the Racers to their second straight OVC regular-season championship. Though they lost in the 2011 OVC tournament, the Racers again went to the postseason in the form of the 2011 National Invitation Tournament.

As a junior, Canaan and the Racers had a breakout season. Canaan was named to the preseason All-OVC team. Led by Canaan, Murray State began the season with a school and conference record 23 straight wins. Included was a 2011 Great Alaska Shootout tournament championship, as Canaan was named MVP, scoring 36 in the tournament final. Canaan, the Racers' leading scorer, was named to the finalist lists for the Bob Cousy Award and the Oscar Robertson Award.

On February 17, 2018, Murray State retired Canaan's number 3 jersey.

== Professional career ==
=== Houston Rockets (2013–2015) ===
Canaan was selected 34th overall in the 2013 NBA draft by the Houston Rockets. On July 15, 2013, he signed his rookie scale contract with the Rockets. During his rookie season, he had multiple assignments with the Rio Grande Valley Vipers of the NBA Development League.

On February 3, 2014, Canaan was named to the Prospects All-Star roster for the 2014 NBA D-League All-Star Game.

On November 26, 2014, Canaan scored a career high 24 points on 9-of-16 shooting in the 102–89 win over the Sacramento Kings. Two days later, Cannan left the game against the Los Angeles Clippers with a left ankle sprain and didn't return. At the time he left the injury, he was the Rockets leading scorer with 13 points. As a result of the injury, he was required to wear a walking boot and use crutches. After being forced to sit out for a few weeks to heal, he was reassigned to the Rio Grande Valley Vipers on January 11, 2015, while he continued his recovery. On January 26, 2015, he was recalled by the Rockets after averaging 21.0 points, 8.5 assists and 3.1 rebounds per game.

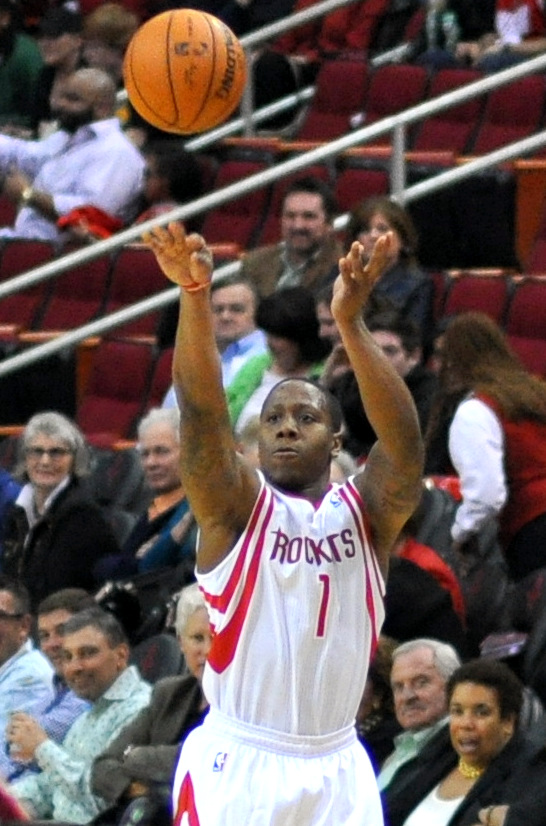
Canaan with the Houston Rockets in 2014

=== Philadelphia 76ers (2015–2016) ===
On February 19, 2015, Canaan was traded, along with a 2015 second-round draft pick, to the Philadelphia 76ers in exchange for K. J. McDaniels. Three days later, he made his debut for the 76ers as the team's starting point guard. In 29 minutes of action, he recorded 14 points, 4 rebounds and 3 assists in a 103–98 loss to the Orlando Magic. On March 4, 2015, he recorded career highs of 31 points and eight three-pointers in a 123–118 overtime loss to the Oklahoma City Thunder.

On March 21, 2016, Canaan made three three-pointers against the Indiana Pacers, giving him 158 for the 2015–16 season and breaking a tie with Allen Iverson for No. 5 on the franchise's single-season list. On April 8, 2016, he was ruled out for the rest of the season with a torn labrum in his left shoulder.

=== Chicago Bulls (2016–2017) ===
On July 20, 2016, Canaan signed with the Chicago Bulls. In 2016–17, Canaan appeared in 39 games and averaged 4.6 points, 1.3 rebounds, 0.9 assists, and 0.56 steals in 15.2 minutes per game. He shot .364 from the field, .266 from three-point range and .909 from the free throw line. Canaan made his first career postseason appearance on April 23, 2017, against the Boston Celtics and logged his first career playoff start on April 26. On June 30, 2017, he was waived by the Bulls.

=== Return to Houston (2017) ===
On September 24, 2017, Canaan signed with the Oklahoma City Thunder. He was waived by the Thunder on October 14 after appearing in three preseason games. On October 24, 2017, Canaan signed with the Houston Rockets. He was waived by the Rockets four days later after appearing in one game.

=== Phoenix Suns (2017–2018) ===
On December 12, 2017, Canaan was acquired by the Northern Arizona Suns of the NBA G League. The next day, he was called up by the Phoenix Suns, after Phoenix received an injury hardship exemption. He made his debut with Phoenix on December 16, scoring 15 points and making three game-winning free throws with six seconds left in a 108–106 win over the Minnesota Timberwolves. Two days later, he scored 17 points in a 97–91 win over the Dallas Mavericks. With seven assists against Minnesota and six against Dallas, Canaan became the first player in Suns history to come off the bench and have at least 15 points and five assists in their first two games with the team. On December 23, 2017, the Suns retained him for the rest of the season. On January 31, 2018, Canaan fractured his left ankle while driving to the rim in the first quarter of their game against the Mavericks. He was subsequently waived by the Suns on February 8.

On August 3, 2018, Canaan re-signed with the Phoenix Suns. In the Suns' season opener on October 17, 2018, Canaan got the start at point guard and had eight points, six rebounds and seven assists in a 121–100 win over the Dallas Mavericks. On November 14, he had 19 points and made all five of his 3-pointers in a 116–96 win over the San Antonio Spurs. Canaan began the season as the team's starting point guard before coach Igor Kokoškov moved Devin Booker to the point and inserted rookie Mikal Bridges into the starting lineup. On November 28, he was waived by the Suns. Kokoškov noted that it "was a business decision" to waive Canaan.

=== Minnesota Timberwolves (2019) ===
On January 30, 2019, Canaan signed a 10-day contract with the Minnesota Timberwolves. On February 11, he signed a second 10-day contract with the Timberwolves. Following the expiration of his second 10-day contract, the Timberwolves decided not to sign Canaan for the rest of the season.

=== Milwaukee Bucks (2019) ===
On February 25, 2019, Canaan signed a 10-day contract with the Milwaukee Bucks, but was released on March 3.

=== Stockton Kings (2019–2020) ===
On August 22, 2019, Canaan signed with Shandong Golden Stars of the CBA.

On December 7, 2019, the Stockton Kings had acquired the returning right of Canaan with a third-round draft pick in the 2020 NBA G League draft from the Austin Spurs for the returning rights of Cameron Reynolds and a second-round draft pick in the 2020 NBA G League Draft. Canaan made his Stockton debut on December 13, 2019. On January 19, 2020, Canaan scored 32 points and had six assists in a loss to the Agua Caliente Clippers.

=== UNICS Kazan (2020–2022) ===
On July 19, 2020, Canaan signed with UNICS Kazan of the VTB United League and the EuroCup. He averaged 14.2 points and 2.7 assists per game. Canaan re-signed with the team on July 7, 2021. He left the team in early 2022 due to the 2022 Russian invasion of Ukraine.

=== Galatasaray (2022) ===
On March 31, 2022, he signed with Galatasaray Nef of the Basketbol Süper Ligi (BSL). During his 12 appearances in Turkish BSL he averaged 11.3 points, 2.2 assists, 1.9 rebounds, and 0.6 steals per game.

=== Olympiacos (2022–2024) ===
On 8 July 2022, Canaan signed a two-year (1+1) deal with Olympiacos of the Greek Basket League and the EuroLeague. On 5 July 2023, Olympiacos picked up the option in their mutual contract and Canaan remained with the club.

=== KK Crvena Zvezda (2024–2026) ===
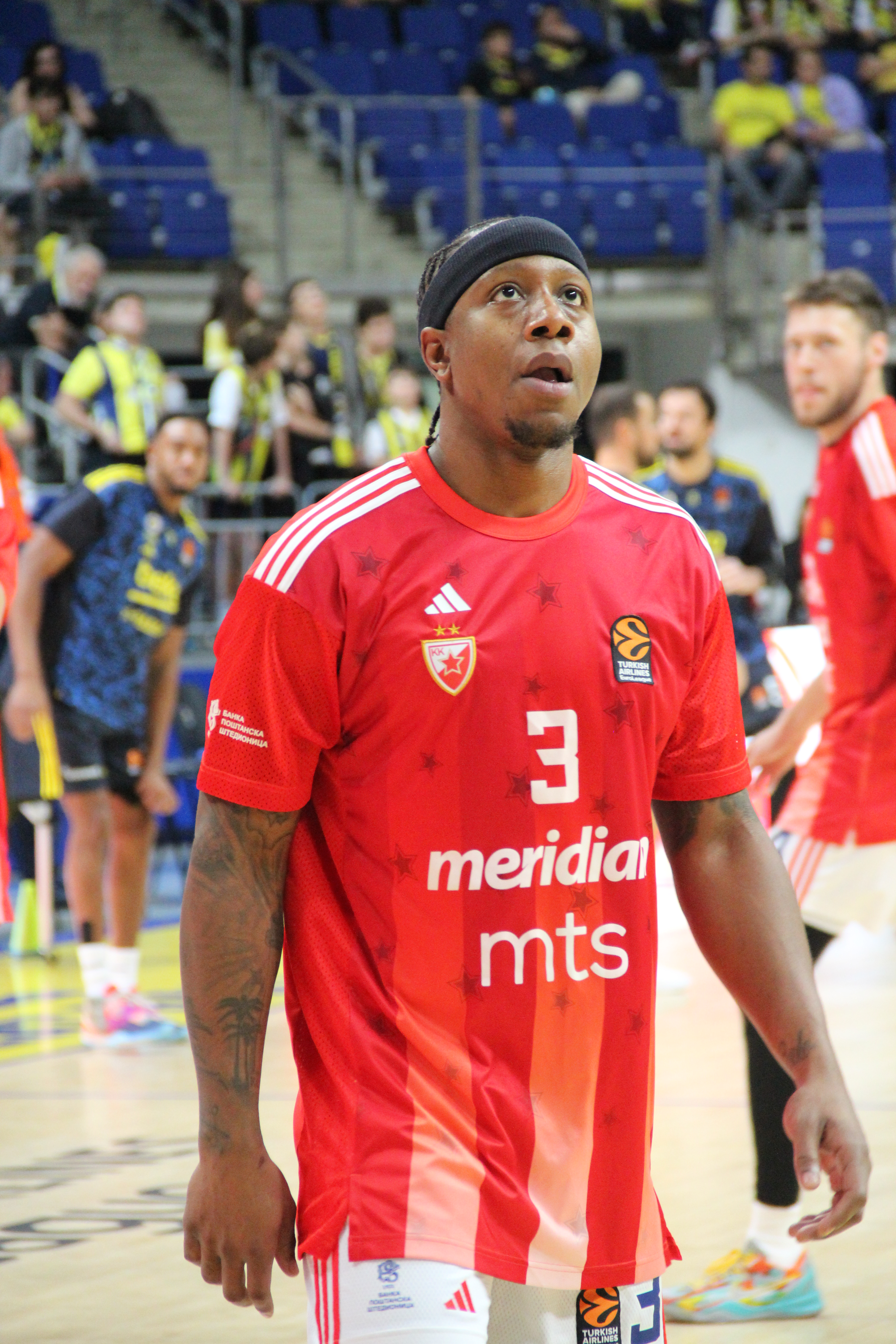
Canaan with Crvena zvezda in 2024

On September 29, 2025, Canaan suffered an injury to the ACL during the first half of the VTB Supercup game against Dubai.

=== Trabzonspor (2026) ===
On August 21, 2026, Canaan signed with Trabzonspor of the Basketbol Süper Ligi (BSL). On November 12, 2026, Canaan's contract with the team was terminated due to his failure to comply with team instructions.

== Career statistics ==
Legend
GP	Games played	GS	Games started	MPG	Minutes per game
FG%	Field-goal percentage	3P%	3-point field-goal percentage	FT%	Free-throw percentage
RPG	Rebounds per game	APG	Assists per game	SPG	Steals per game
BPG	Blocks per game	PPG	Points per game	PIR	Performance index rating
**Bold**	Career high

=== NBA ===
==== Regular season ====
Year	Team	GP	GS	MPG	FG%	3P%	FT%	RPG	APG	SPG	BPG	PPG
2013–14	Houston	22	0	11.5	.356	.327	.724	1.1	1.0	.4	.2	4.6
2014–15	Houston	25	9	14.8	**.405**	.381	.762	1.3	1.2	.6	—	6.2
2014–15	Philadelphia	22	12	25.9	.377	.364	.846	2.5	3.1	**.7**	.1	**12.6**
2015–16	Philadelphia	**77**	**39**	25.5	.360	.363	.833	2.3	1.8	**.7**	.2	11.0
2016–17	Chicago	39	0	25.5	.364	.266	.909	1.3	.9	.6	.0	4.6
2017–18	Houston	1	0	4.0	—	—	—	1.0	—	—	—	0.0
2017–18	Phoenix	19	1	22.0	.382	.333	.902	2.3	**4.0**	.8	.1	9.1
2018–19	Phoenix	19	15	**26.5**	.395	.347	.750	**2.6**	3.3	.6	—	7.5
2018–19	Minnesota	7	1	13.5	.379	.368	**1.000**	.7	2.7	.3	.1	4.7
2018–19	Milwaukee	4	0	7.8	.333	**.400**	.000	1.0	.8	—	**.3**	1.5
Career		235	77	20.4	.371	.351	.836	1.9	1.9	.6	.1	8.1

==== Playoffs ====
Year	Team	GP	GS	MPG	FG%	3P%	FT%	RPG	APG	SPG	BPG	PPG
2017	Chicago	3	2	31.7	.500	.357	.667	1.3	1.3	1.0	—	11.7
Career		3	2	31.7	.500	.357	.667	1.3	1.3	1.0	—	11.7

=== EuroLeague ===
*	Led the league

Year	Team	GP	GS	MPG	FG%	3P%	FT%	RPG	APG	SPG	BPG	PPG	PIR
2021–22	UNICS	24	2	**23.9**	.410	.410	.816	**1.8**	1.3	.5	**.2**	**11.8**	6.9
2022–23	Olympiacos	39	36	16.1	.390	.382	.667	1.0	.9	.6	.1	6.3	3.4
2023–24	Olympiacos	**41***	**41***	23.0	**.462**	**.425**	**.882**	1.2	**1.4**	**.9**	.1	11.1	**8.4**
2024–25	Crvena zvezda	35	8	21.0	.412	.383	.864	1.5	1.3	.6	.0	10.0	7.6
Career		138	87	20.4	.426	.402	.837	1.3	1.2	.7	.1	9.6	6.3

=== EuroCup ===
Year	Team	GP	GS	MPG	FG%	3P%	FT%	RPG	APG	SPG	BPG	PPG	PIR
2020–21	UNICS	24	21	27.0	.404	.356	.944	2.9	3.1	.9	.0	14.1	12.1
Career		24	21	27.0	.404	.356	.944	2.9	3.1	.9	.0	14.1	12.1

=== Domestic leagues ===
Year	Team	League	GP	MPG	FG%	3P%	FT%	RPG	APG	SPG	BPG	PPG
2013–14	(United States) R. G. Valley Vipers	D-League	18	34.0	.437	.369	.811	4.0	8.2	.7	.2	21.8
2014–15	(United States) R. G. Valley Vipers	D-League	4	35.9	.368	.349	.633	3.5	8.5	.7	—	21.0
2017–18	(United States) N. A. Suns	G League	1	24.9	.667	.750	.750	3.0	6.0	—	1.0	18.0
2019–20	(United States) Stockton Kings	G League	30	31.3	.434	.417	.814	4.0	5.9	1.2	.0	21.4
2020–21	(Russia) UNICS	VTBUL	24	26.3	.422	.418	.877	2.6	2.4	.4	.2	14.3
2021–22	(Russia) UNICS	VTBUL	12	21.1	.420	.440	.813	1.8	1.1	1.2	.1	12.7
2021–22	(Turkey) Galatasaray	TBSL	12	22.5	.421	.432	.700	1.9	2.2	.6	—	11.3
2022–23	(Greece) Olympiacos	GBL	16	17.7	.442	.448	.938	1.1	1.1	.6	—	10.0
2023–24	(Greece) Olympiacos	GBL	33	22.8	.446	.462	.727	1.7	1.5	.9	.0	10.8

=== College ===
Year	Team	GP	GS	MPG	FG%	3P%	FT%	RPG	APG	SPG	BPG	PPG
2009–10	Murray State	**36**	0	20.4	**.498**	**.482**	.778	2.3	1.6	.9	—	10.4
2010–11	Murray State	32	20	28.1	.416	.403	.744	1.9	2.4	1.1	**.1**	11.7
2011–12	Murray State	33	**33**	33.7	.468	.456	**.837**	**3.5**	3.6	1.4	**.1**	19.0
2012–13	Murray State	31	30	**36.5**	.431	.370	.822	**3.5**	**4.3**	**1.5**	**.1**	**21.8**
Career		132	83	29.4	.450	.419	.803	2.8	2.9	1.2	.1	15.5
