= 2009–10 Morehead State Eagles men's basketball team =

American college basketball season

2009–10 Morehead State Eagles men's basketball

CBI, Quarterfinals
- Conference: Ohio Valley Conference
- Record: 24–11 (15–3 OVC)
- Head coach: Donnie Tyndall (4th season)
- Assistant coaches: Chris Moore (4th season); Joel Zimmerman (2nd season); Matt Grady (1st season)
- Home arena: Ellis Johnson Arena

2009–10 Ohio Valley Conference men's basketball standings
	Conf.				Overall
Team	W		L	PCT	W		L	PCT
Murray State †	17	–	1	.944	31	–	5	.861
Morehead State	15	–	3	.833	24	–	11	.686
Eastern Illinois	11	–	7	.611	19	–	12	.613
Austin Peay	11	–	7	.611	17	–	15	.531
Eastern Kentucky	11	–	7	.611	20	–	12	.625
Tennessee Tech	8	–	10	.444	15	–	17	.469
Jacksonville State	7	–	11	.389	11	–	19	.367
Tennessee State	6	–	12	.333	9	–	23	.281
Southeast Missouri State	3	–	15	.167	7	–	23	.233
UT Martin	1	–	17	.056	4	–	25	.138
† 2010 OVC tournament winner As of March 22, 2010; Rankings from AP Poll

The 2009–10 Morehead State Eagles men's basketball team represented Morehead State University in the 2009–10 NCAA Division I men's basketball season. The Eagles were led by head coach Donnie Tyndall in his fourth year leading the team. Morehead State played their home games at Ellis Johnson Arena in Morehead, Kentucky, as members of the Ohio Valley Conference.

The Eagles finished conference play with an 15–3 record, earning the second seed in the Ohio Valley tournament. Morehead State advanced to the OVC Championship game, but were defeated in the title game by Murray State.

Morehead State failed to qualify for the NCAA tournament, but were invited to the 2010 College Basketball Invitational. The Eagles won their first game in the CBI, but were eliminated in the quarterfinals by Boston University, 91–89, in overtime.

The Eagles finished the season with a 24–11 record.

== Roster ==
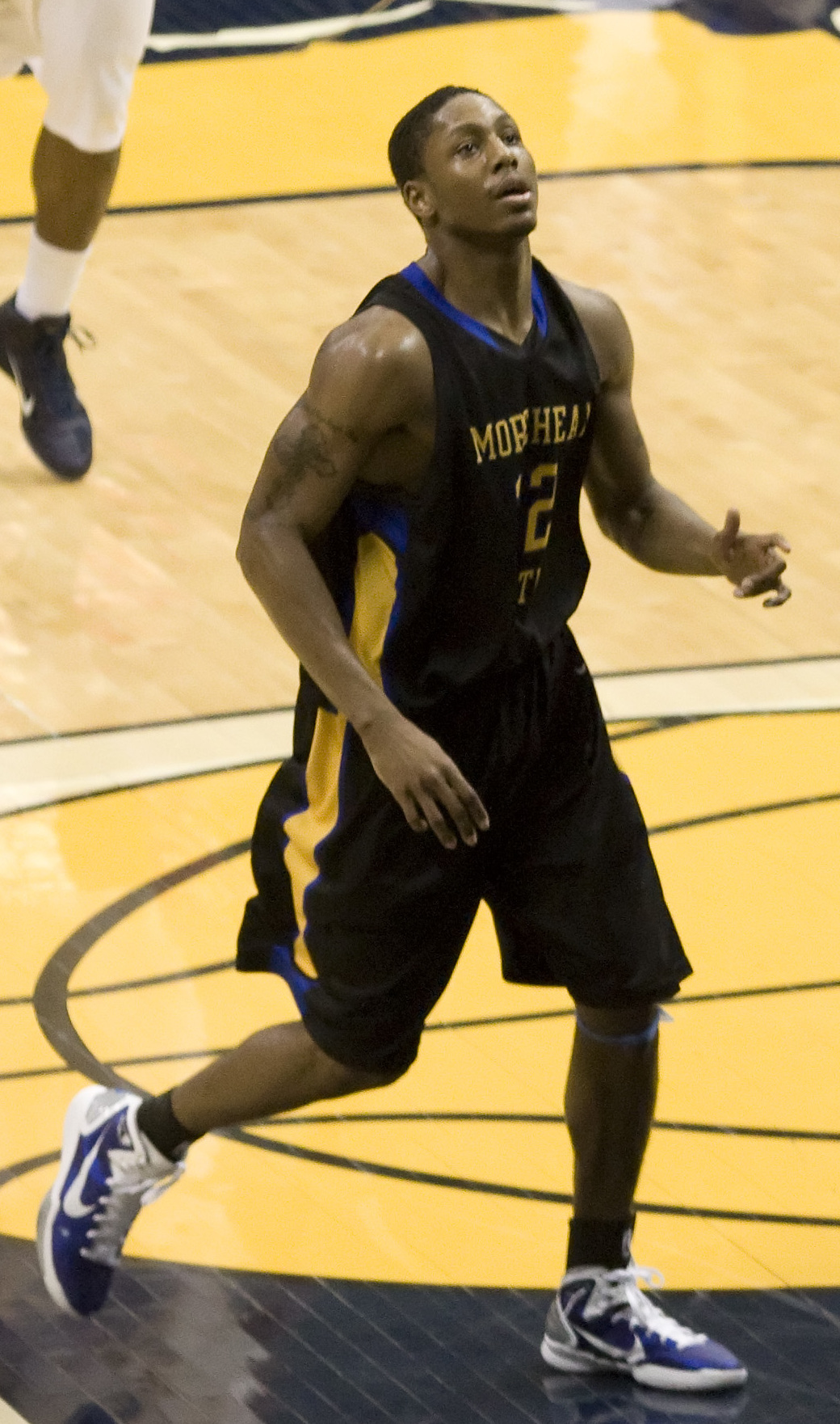
Demonte Harper

2009–10 Morehead State Eagles men's basketball team
Players
Coaches

Pos.	#	Name	Height	Weight	Year	Hometown
F	1	Maze Stallworth	6 ft 4 in (1.93 m)	215 lb (98 kg)	Sr	Elizabethtown, Kentucky
F	2	Jamel Marshall	6 ft 5 in (1.96 m)	225 lb (102 kg)	Fr	Orlando, Florida
G	3	Aaron Williams	5 ft 10 in (1.78 m)	175 lb (79 kg)	RS Fr	Louisville, Kentucky
G	5	Rashad Hosea	6 ft 3 in (1.91 m)	185 lb (84 kg)	RS So	Detroit, Michigan
G	10	Corey Clemens	6 ft 2 in (1.88 m)	175 lb (79 kg)	Fr	New Castle, Indiana
G	11	Terrance Hill	6 ft 1 in (1.85 m)	170 lb (77 kg)	So	Columbus, Georgia
G	13	Ty Proffitt	6 ft 4 in (1.93 m)	200 lb (91 kg)	RS So	London, Kentucky
G	15	Brandon Shingles	6 ft 3 in (1.91 m)	175 lb (79 kg)	Sr	Albany, Georgia
G	22	Demonte Harper	6 ft 4 in (1.93 m)	185 lb (84 kg)	Jr	Nashville, Tennessee
F	23	David Terrell	6 ft 5 in (1.96 m)	225 lb (102 kg)	Jr	Houston, Texas
F	24	Steve Peterson	6 ft 5 in (1.96 m)	190 lb (86 kg)	So	Columbus, Georgia
G	25	John Lamb	6 ft 1 in (1.85 m)	180 lb (82 kg)	Jr	Indianola, Iowa
F	33	Jason Beharie	6 ft 9 in (2.06 m)	230 lb (104 kg)	Fr	London, England, United Kingdom
G	34	Sam Goodman	6 ft 2 in (1.88 m)	185 lb (84 kg)	Jr	Lawrenceville, Georgia
F/C	35	Kenneth Faried	6 ft 8 in (2.03 m)	225 lb (102 kg)	Jr	Newark, New Jersey
F/C	45	Les Simmons	6 ft 7 in (2.01 m)	220 lb (100 kg)	RS Sr	Mountainville, New York

Head coach

- Donnie Tyndall (Morehead State)

Assistant coach(es)

- Matt Grady (Saint Joseph's)
- Chris Moore (Kentucky State)
- Joel Zimmerman (Anderson (IN))

Legend

- (C) Team captain
- (S) Suspended
- (I) Ineligible
- (W) Walk-on
- Injured
- Current redshirt

Roster
Last update: February 17, 2023

== Schedule and results ==
Date time, TV	Rank^{#}	Opponent^{#}	Result	Record	Site (attendance) city, state
Exhibition
November 4, 2009*; 7:00 pm		Cedarville	W 90–58	—	Ellis Johnson Arena; Morehead, KY
November 9, 2009*; 7:00 pm		Asbury	W 91–57	—	Ellis Johnson Arena; Morehead, KY
Regular season
November 13, 2009*; 6:30 pm, ESPNU		at No. 4 Kentucky	L 59–75	0–1	Rupp Arena (24,338); Lexington, KY
November 16, 2009*; 7:00 pm		Brescia	W 86–51	1–1	Ellis Johnson Arena (1,659); Morehead, KY
November 21, 2009*; 7:30 pm		Louisiana–Monroe	L 73–74	1–2	Ellis Johnson Arena (2,114); Morehead, KY
November 29, 2009*; 7:00 pm, Wazoo Sports		Kent State	L 57–63	1–3	Ellis Johnson Arena (2,201); Morehead, KY
December 3, 2009; 8:30 pm		at UT Martin	W 74–66	2–3 (1–0)	Skyhawk Arena (2,135); Martin, TN
December 5, 2009; 8:30 pm		at Murray State	L 56–86	2–4 (1–1)	Regional Special Events Center (3,831); Murray, KY
December 15, 2009*; 12:00 pm		St. Catharine	W 81–53	3–4	Ellis Johnson Arena (2,525); Morehead, KY
December 18, 2009*; 7:45 pm		East Tennessee State	W 60–58	4–4	Ellis Johnson Arena (1,746); Morehead, KY
December 21, 2009*; 10:05 pm		at Utah State; Basketball Travelers Invitational	L 72–79	4–5	Smith Spectrum (9,086); Logan, UT
December 22, 2009*; 7:30 pm		vs. Weber State; Basketball Travelers Invitational	L 64–66	4–6	Smith Spectrum (1,187); Logan, UT
December 23, 2009*; 7:30 pm		vs. Cal State Fullerton; Basketball Travelers Invitational	W 69–62	5–6	Smith Spectrum (757); Logan, UT
December 28, 2009*; 8:00 pm		at South Dakota	W 66–64	6–6	DakotaDome (1,045); Vermillion, SD
January 2, 2010; 9:00 pm, ESPNU		Austin Peay	W 68–65 ^{OT}	7–6 (2–1)	Ellis Johnson Arena (3,497); Morehead, KY
January 4, 2010; 7:30 pm, Wazoo Sports		Tennessee State	W 72–66	8–6 (3–1)	Ellis Johnson Arena (2,022); Morehead, KY
January 7, 2010; 8:30 pm		at Tennessee Tech	W 77–64	9–6 (4–1)	Eblen Center (555); Cookeville, TN
January 9, 2010; 5:30 pm		at Jacksonville State	W 78–71	10–6 (5–1)	Pete Mathews Coliseum (1,632); Jacksonville, AL
January 14, 2010; 7:30 pm		Southeast Missouri State	W 80–40	11–6 (6–1)	Ellis Johnson Arena (2,824); Morehead, KY
January 16, 2010; 4:30 pm		Eastern Illinois	W 73–51	12–6 (7–1)	Ellis Johnson Arena (2,345); Morehead, KY
January 19, 2010*; 7:00 pm		SIU Edwardsville	W 66–46	13–6	Ellis Johnson Arena (1,910); Morehead, KY
January 23, 2010; 7:00 pm		at Eastern Kentucky	W 69–53	14–6 (8–1)	McBrayer Arena (5,600); Richmond, KY
January 28, 2010; 8:30 pm		at Tennessee State	W 65–50	15–6 (9–1)	Gentry Complex (2,486); Nashville, TN
January 31, 2010; 4:00 pm		at Austin Peay	L 55–56	15–7 (9–2)	Dunn Center (2,807); Clarksville, TN
February 4, 2010; 7:30 pm		Jacksonville State	W 94–75	16–7 (10–2)	Ellis Johnson Arena (2,854); Morehead, KY
February 6, 2010; 8:00 pm, Wazoo Sports		Tennessee Tech	W 84–75	17–7 (11–2)	Ellis Johnson Arena (3,772); Morehead, KY
February 11, 2010; 9:00 pm, ESPNU		at Eastern Illinois	L 75–76	17–8 (11–3)	Lantz Arena (1,701); Charleston, IL
February 13, 2010; 8:45 pm		at Southeast Missouri State	W 73–54	18–8 (12–3)	Show Me Center (2,319); Cape Girardeau, MO
February 17, 2010; 7:00 pm, Wazoo Sports		Eastern Kentucky	W 77–64	19–8 (13–3)	Ellis Johnson Arena (5,290); Morehead, KY
February 20, 2010*; 5:05 pm		at Illinois State; ESPN BracketBusters	L 62–71	19–9	Redbird Arena (5,953); Normal, IL
February 25, 2010; 8:00 pm, Wazoo Sports		Murray State	W 75–70	20–9 (14–3)	Ellis Johnson Arena (5,103); Morehead, KY
February 27, 2010; 7:30 pm		UT Martin	W 73–63	21–9 (15–3)	Ellis Johnson Arena (4,012); Morehead, KY
Ohio Valley tournament
March 2, 2010; 7:45 pm	(2)	(7) Jacksonville State; OVC Quarterfinals	W 87–54	22–9	Ellis Johnson Arena (2,238); Morehead, KY
March 5, 2010; 9:00 pm	(2)	vs. (6) Tennessee Tech; OVC Semifinals	W 76–47	23–9	Bridgestone Arena (2,879); Nashville, TN
March 6, 2010; 8:00 pm, ESPNU	(2)	vs. (1) Murray State; OVC Championship Game	L 51–62	23–10	Bridgestone Arena (3,530); Nashville, TN
CBI
March 17, 2010; 9:00 pm, HDNet		Colorado State; CBI First Round	W 74–60	24–10	Ellis Johnson Arena (1,612); Morehead, KY
March 22, 2010; 7:00 pm		at Boston University; CBI Quarterfinals	L 89–91 ^{OT}	24–11	Case Gym (640); Boston, MA
*Non-conference game. ^{#}Rankings from AP Poll. (#) Tournament seedings in parentheses. All times are in Eastern Time. Source
