= 2009–10 Iona Gaels men's basketball team =

American college basketball season

2009–10 Iona Gaels men's basketball
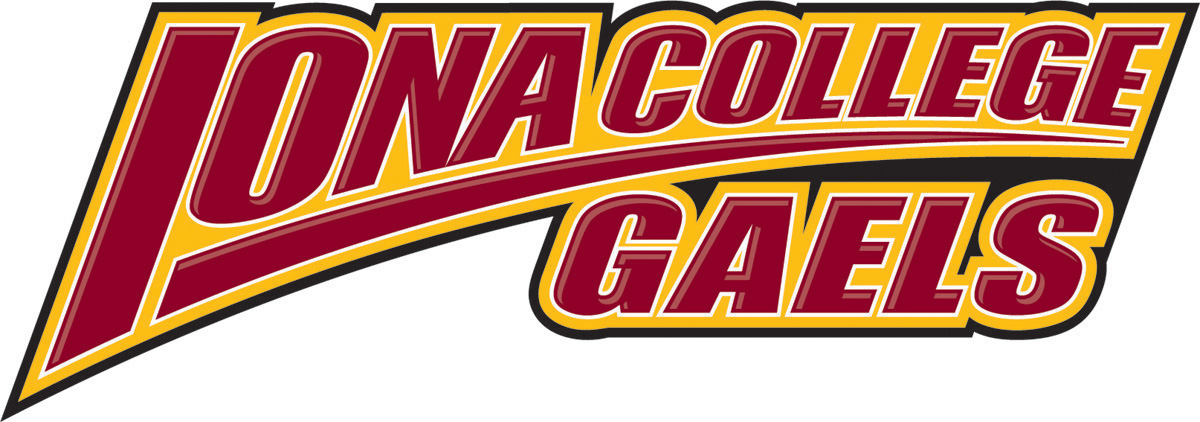
- Conference: Metro Atlantic Athletic Conference
- Record: 21–10 (12–6 MAAC)
- Head coach: Kevin Willard (3rd season)
- Home arena: Hynes Athletics Center

2009–10 MAAC men's basketball standings
	Conf.				Overall
Team	W		L	PCT	W		L	PCT
Siena †	17	–	1	.944	27	–	7	.794
Fairfield	13	–	5	.722	23	–	11	.676
Iona	12	–	6	.667	21	–	10	.677
Saint Peter's	11	–	7	.611	16	–	14	.533
Rider	9	–	9	.500	17	–	16	.515
Niagara	9	–	9	.500	18	–	15	.545
Canisius	8	–	10	.444	15	–	17	.469
Loyola	6	–	12	.333	13	–	17	.433
Manhattan	4	–	14	.222	11	–	20	.355
Marist	1	–	17	.056	1	–	29	.033
† 2010 MAAC tournament winner Rankings from AP Poll

The 2009–10 Iona Gaels men's basketball team represented Iona College during the 2009–10 NCAA Division I men's basketball season. The Gaels, led by third year head coach Kevin Willard, played their home games at Hynes Athletics Center and are members of the Metro Atlantic Athletic Conference. They finished the season 21–10, 12–6 in MAAC and lost in the quarterfinals of the 2010 MAAC men's basketball tournament to Niagara.

== Roster ==
Number	Name	Position	Height	Weight	Year	Hometown
1	Mike McFadden	Forward	6–8	220	Freshman	Newark, NJ
2	Keon Williams	Forward	6-6	175	Freshman	Hackensack, NJ
3	Scott Machado	Guard	6–1	180	Junior	Queens, NY
5	Rashon Dwight	Guard	6–3	185	Junior	Newark, NJ
10	Jermel Jenkins	Guard	5–11	185	Junior	Union, NJ
11	Trinity Fields	Guard	6–2	175	Junior	Queens, NY
11	Milan Prodanovic	Guard	6–2	180	Senior	Queens, NY
12	Rashard McGill	Guard	6–5	205	Freshman	Havana, FL
21	Alejo Rodriquez	Forward	6–8	235	Junior	New York, NY
30	Jonathan Huffman	Forward	7–0	235	Senior	Montgomery, AL
44	Chris Pelcher	Center	6–10	240	Sophomore	Albany, NY
50	David Nelson	Forward	6–8	240	Junior	Denver, CO

== Schedule ==
Date time, TV	Rank^{#}	Opponent^{#}	Result	Record	Site (attendance) city, state
Regular season
Nov 13, 2009*		Boston University	W 82–73	1–0	Hynes Athletics Center (2,110); New Rochelle, NY
Nov 17, 2009*		at Hampton	W 68–63	2–0	Hampton Convocation Center (5,634); Hampton, VA
Nov 21, 2009*		Norfolk State	W 80–68	3–0	Hynes Athletics Center (1,907); New Rochelle, NY
Nov 26, 2009*		vs. Florida State; Old Spice Classic	L 49–54	3–1	State Farm Field House (2,149); Bay Lake, FL
Nov 27, 2009*		vs. Baylor; Old Spice Classic	L 62–72 ^{OT}	3–2	State Farm Field House (1,915); Bay Lake, FL
Nov 29, 2009*		vs. Creighton; Old Spice Classic	W 63–55	4–2	State Farm Field House (1,846); Bay Lake, FL
Dec 4, 2009		Saint Peter's	L 54–56	4–3 (0–1)	Hynes Athletics Center (1,955); New Rochelle, NY
Dec 7, 2009		Siena	L 60–73	4–4 (0–2)	Hynes Athletics Center (2,130); New Rochelle, NY
Dec 9, 2009*		Long Island	W 80–64	5–4	Hynes Athletics Center (1,249); New Rochelle, NY
Dec 12, 2009*		at Providence	W 82–73	6–4	Dunkin' Donuts Center (6,851); Providence, RI
Dec 17, 2009*		Albany	W 75–62	7–4	Hynes Athletics Center (1,462); New Rochelle, NY
Dec 23, 2009*		at Fairleigh Dickinson	W 82–60	8–4	Rothman Center (489); Hackensack, NJ
Dec 27, 2009*		at No. 11 Connecticut	L 74–93	8–5	XL Center (13,867); Hartford, CT
Jan 2, 2010		vs. Niagara	W 63–60	9–5 (1–2)	HSBC Arena (2,616); Buffalo, NY
Jan 4, 2010		at Canisius	L 65–77	9–6 (1–3)	Koessler Athletic Center (981); Buffalo, NY
Jan 9, 2010		at Rider	W 69–49	10–6 (2–3)	Alumni Gymnasium (1,584); Lawrenceville, NJ
Jan 11, 2010		at Loyola (MD)	W 59–50	11–6 (3–3)	Reitz Arena (1,125); Baltimore, MD
Jan 16, 2010		Niagara	W 64–47	12–6 (4–3)	Hynes Athletics Center (2,235); New Rochelle, NY
Jan 18, 2010		Rider	W 72–59	13–6 (5–3)	Hynes Athletics Center (2,370); New Rochelle, NY
Jan 22, 2010		at Manhattan	W 56–53	14–6 (6–3)	Draddy Gymnasium (2,010); Bronx, NY
Jan 24 ,2010		Fairfield	W 68–58	15–6 (7–3)	Hynes Athletics Center (1,524); New Rochelle, NY
Jan 28, 2010		Marist	W 61–42	16–6 (8–3)	Hynes Athletics Center (2,015); New Rochelle, NY
Feb 1, 2010		Canisius	W 72–53	17–6 (9–3)	Hynes Athletics Center (2,424); New Rochelle, NY
Feb 5, 2010		at Siena	L 68–88	17–7 (9–4)	Times Union Center (8,065); Albany, NY
Feb 7, 2010		at Marist	W 56–51	18–7 (10–4)	McCann Arena (1,604); Poughkeepsie, NY
Feb 12, 2010		Manhattan	L 60–66	18–8 (10–5)	Hynes Athletics Center (2,564); New Rochelle, NY
Feb 14, 2010		Loyola (MD)	W 70–62	19–8 (11–5)	Hynes Athletics Center (2,403); New Rochelle, NY
Feb 19, 2010*		William & Mary; ESPN BracketBusters	W 69–53	20–8	Hynes Athletics Center (2,611); New Rochelle, NY
Feb 26, 2010		at Fairfield	L 54–71	20–9 (11–6)	Arena at Harbor Yard (3,143); Bridgeport, CT
Feb 28, 2010		at Saint Peter's	W 49–48	21–9 (12–6)	Yanitelli Center (1,028); Jersey City, NJ
MAAC tournament
Mar 6, 2010	(3)	vs. (6) Niagara; Quarterfinals	L 64–68	21–10	Times Union Center (4,413); Albany, NY
*Non-conference game. ^{#}Rankings from AP Poll. (#) Tournament seedings in parentheses. All times are in Eastern Time.
