= 2009–10 Murray State Racers men's basketball team =

American college basketball season

2009–10 Murray State Racers men's basketball

OVC Regular Season and tournament champions

NCAA tournament, Round of 32
- Conference: Ohio Valley Conference
- Record: 31–5 (17–1 OVC)
- Head coach: Billy Kennedy
- Assistant coaches: Amir Abdur-Rahim; Isaac Chew; Steve Prohm
- Home arena: Regional Special Events Center

2009–10 Ohio Valley Conference men's basketball standings
	Conf.				Overall
Team	W		L	PCT	W		L	PCT
Murray State †	17	–	1	.944	31	–	5	.861
Morehead State	15	–	3	.833	24	–	11	.686
Eastern Illinois	11	–	7	.611	19	–	12	.613
Austin Peay	11	–	7	.611	17	–	15	.531
Eastern Kentucky	11	–	7	.611	20	–	12	.625
Tennessee Tech	8	–	10	.444	15	–	17	.469
Jacksonville State	7	–	11	.389	11	–	19	.367
Tennessee State	6	–	12	.333	9	–	23	.281
Southeast Missouri State	3	–	15	.167	7	–	23	.233
UT Martin	1	–	17	.056	4	–	25	.138
† 2010 OVC tournament winner As of March 22, 2010; Rankings from AP Poll

The 2009–10 Murray State Racers men's basketball team represented Murray State University in the 2009–10 college basketball season. This was head coach Billy Kennedy's fourth season at Murray State. The Racers competed in the Ohio Valley Conference and played their home games at the Regional Special Events Center, also known simply as the RSEC. They finished the season 31–5, 17–1 in OVC play to capture the regular season championship. They also won the 2010 Ohio Valley Conference men's basketball tournament to earn the conference's automatic bid to the 2010 NCAA Division I men's basketball tournament. They earned a 13 seed in the West Region where they upset 4 seed and AP #21 Vanderbilt in the first round before losing to 5 seed and AP #11 Butler in the second round.

== Roster ==
#	Name	Height	Weight (lbs.)	Position	Class	Hometown	Previous Team(s)
0	Isaac Miles	6'2"	205	G	Jr.	Kansas City, MO, U.S.	Bishop Miege HS
1	B. J. Jenkins	6'0"	180	G	Jr.	Virginia Beach, VA, U.S.	Green Run HS
2	Ed Daniel	6'7"	220	F	Fr.	Birmingham, AL, U.S.	Woodlawn HS
3	Isaiah Canaan	6'0"	175	G	Fr.	Biloxi, MS, U.S.	Biloxi HS
10	Jordan Burge	5'11"	170	G	Fr.	Mayfield, KY, U.S.	Northside Baptist Christian
11	Donte Poole	6'3"	185	G	So.	Las Vegas, NV, U.S.	Mojave HS
12	Danero Thomas	6'4"	190	F	Sr.	New Orleans, LA, U.S.	Mount Zion Christian Academy
14	Picasso Simmons	6'0"	170	G	Jr.	Gallatin, TN, U.S.	Lee Academy
22	Jeffery McClain	6'6"	230	F	Jr.	Hickman, KY, U.S.	Fulton County HS; Three Rivers CC
23	A.J. Wilson	6'8"	215	F	Jr.	St. Paul, MN, U.S.	Saint Bernard's HS; Northeastern JC (CO)
33	Jewuan Long	6'1"	180	G	So.	Jackson, TN, U.S.	Liberty Tech HS
42	Ivan Aska	6'7"	230	F	So.	Ft. Lauderdale, FL, U.S.	Boyd H. Anderson HS
43	Tony Easley	6'9"	200	F	Sr.	Auburn, AL, U.S.	Auburn HS
50	Georges Fotso	6'8"	240	F	Sr.	Douala, Cameroon	Piney Woods HS

== Schedule and results ==
Date time, TV	Rank^{#}	Opponent^{#}	Result	Record	Site (attendance) city, state
Exhibition
11/5/2009; 7:00pm		Bethel (TN)	W 93–39	—	RSEC (1,954); Murray, KY
Regular season
11/9/2009*; 10:00pm, ESPNU		at No. 13 California; Coaches vs. Cancer Classic	L 70–75	0–1	Haas Pavilion (7,603); Berkeley, CA
11/14/2009*; 7:00pm		UMKC	W 92–54	1–1	RSEC (2,936); Murray, KY
11/20/2009*; 3:00pm		vs. James Madison; Coaches vs. Cancer Classic	W 71–43	2–1	U.S. Century Bank Arena; Miami, FL
11/22/2009*; 7:00pm		vs. North Carolina Central; Coaches vs. Cancer Classic	W 84–61	3–1	U.S. Century Bank Arena (1,043); Miami, FL
11/23/2009*; 6:00pm		at FIU; Coaches vs. Cancer Classic	W 84–71	4–1	U.S. Century Bank Arena (905); Miami, FL
11/28/2009*; 7:00pm		Tennessee Wesleyan	W 108–49	5–1	RSEC (2,106); Murray, KY
12/3/2009; 6:00pm, ESPNU		Eastern Kentucky	W 62–60	6–1 (1–0)	RSEC (3,984); Murray, KY
12/5/2009; 7:30pm		Morehead State	W 86–56	7–1 (2–0)	RSEC (3,831); Murray, KY
12/12/2009*; 3:00pm		at East Tennessee State	W 61–57	8–1	MSHA Athletic Center (2,888); Johnson City, TN
12/15/2009*; 7:00pm		at Louisiana Tech	L 81–87	8–2	Thomas Assembly Center (1,911); Ruston, LA
12/19/2009*; 2:00pm		Chattanooga	W 73–62	9–2	RSEC (2,290); Murray, KY
12/22/2010*; 8:00pm		at Western Kentucky	L 72–83	9–3	E. A. Diddle Arena (5,576); Bowling Green, KY
12/30/2010*; 7:00pm		at SIU Edwardsville	W 82–51	10–3	Vadalabene Center (1,912); Edwardsville, IL
1/4/2010; 7:30pm		UT Martin	W 83–59	11–3 (3–0)	RSEC (2,931); Murray, KY
1/7/2010; 6:00pm		at Tennessee State	W 80–59	12–3 (4–0)	Gentry Center (348); Nashville, TN
1/9/2010; 5:00pm, ESPN2		at Austin Peay	W 69–53	13–3 (5–0)	Dunn Center (4,203); Clarksville, TN
1/11/2010; 7:00pm		Eastern Illinois	W 75–59	14–3 (6–0)	RSEC (3,444); Murray, KY
1/14/2010; 7:30pm		Jacksonville State	W 92–68	15–3 (7–0)	RSEC (3,832); Murray, KY
1/16/2010; 7:30pm		Tennessee Tech	W 88–66	16–3 (8–0)	RSEC (4,837); Murray, KY
1/21/2010; 7:45pm		at Eastern Illinois	W 60–51	17–3 (9–0)	Lantz Arena (1,169); Charleston, IL
1/23/2010; 7:45pm		at Southeast Missouri State	W 80–61	18–3 (10–0)	Show Me Center (3,261); Cape Girardeau, MO
1/27/2010*; 7:00pm		SIU Edwardsville	W 84–51	19–3	RSEC (3,060); Murray, KY
1/30/2010; 1:00pm		at UT Martin	W 77–45	20–3 (11–0)	Skyhawk Arena (1,129); Martin, TN
2/4/2010; 7:30pm		Tennessee State	W 76–54	21–3 (12–0)	RSEC (3,894); Murray, KY
2/6/2010; 7:30pm		Austin Peay	W 65–63	22–3 (13–0)	RSEC (6,017); Murray, KY
2/11/2010; 7:30pm		at Tennessee Tech	W 94–62	23–3 (14–0)	Eblen Center (4,221); Cookeville, TN
2/13/2010; 4:30pm		at Jacksonville State	W 75–67	24–3 (15–0)	Pete Mathews Coliseum (1,919); Jacksonville, AL
2/16/2010; 7:00pm		Southeast Missouri State	W 80–68	25–3 (16–0)	RSEC (3,698); Murray, KY
2/20/2010*; 11:00am, ESPNU		Morgan State; ESPN BracketBusters	W 75–66	26–3	RSEC (5,125); Murray, KY
2/25/2010; 7:00pm		at Morehead State	L 65–70	26–4 (16–1)	Ellis Johnson Arena (5,103); Morehead, KY
2/27/2010; 1:00pm		at Eastern Kentucky	W 88–74	27–4 (17–1)	Alumni Coliseum (4,800); Richmond, KY
OVC tournament
3/2/2010; 7:00pm	(1)	(8) Tennessee State; OVC Quarterfinals	W 84–51	28–4	RSEC (3,245); Murray, KY
3/5/2010; 6:00pm, ESPNU	(1)	vs. (4) Eastern Illinois; OVC Semifinals	W 55–51	29–4	Bridgestone Arena; Nashville, TN
3/6/2010; 7:00pm, ESPN2	(1)	vs. (2) Morehead State; OVC Championship Game	W 62–51	30–4	Bridgestone Arena (3,530); Nashville, TN
NCAA tournament
3/18/2010*; 1:30pm, CBS	(13 W)	vs. (4 W) No. 21 Vanderbilt; NCAA First Round	W 66–65	31–4	HP Pavilion (12,712); San Jose, CA
3/20/2010*; 2:20pm, CBS	(13 W)	vs. (5 W) No. 11 Butler; NCAA Second Round	L 52–54	31–5	HP Pavilion (16,044); San Jose, CA
*Non-conference game. ^{#}Rankings from AP Poll. (#) Tournament seedings in parentheses. W=NCAA West Regional. All times are in Central Time. Source
