= 2009–10 Fairfield Stags men's basketball team =

American college basketball season

2009–10 Fairfield Stags men's basketball

CIT, Second Round
- Conference: Metro Atlantic Athletic Conference
- Record: 23–11 (13–5 MAAC)
- Head coach: Ed Cooley (4th season)
- Home arena: Arena at Harbor Yard

2009–10 MAAC men's basketball standings
	Conf.				Overall
Team	W		L	PCT	W		L	PCT
Siena †	17	–	1	.944	27	–	7	.794
Fairfield	13	–	5	.722	23	–	11	.676
Iona	12	–	6	.667	21	–	10	.677
Saint Peter's	11	–	7	.611	16	–	14	.533
Rider	9	–	9	.500	17	–	16	.515
Niagara	9	–	9	.500	18	–	15	.545
Canisius	8	–	10	.444	15	–	17	.469
Loyola	6	–	12	.333	13	–	17	.433
Manhattan	4	–	14	.222	11	–	20	.355
Marist	1	–	17	.056	1	–	29	.033
† 2010 MAAC tournament winner Rankings from AP Poll

The 2009–10 Fairfield Stags men's basketball team represented Fairfield University during the 2009–10 NCAA Division I men's basketball season. The Stags, led by 4th year head coach Ed Cooley, played their home games at The Arena at Harbor Yard and are members of the Metro Atlantic Athletic Conference. The Stags finished the season 23–11, 13–5 in MAAC play. They lost in the finals of the 2010 MAAC men's basketball tournament to Siena in an overtime thriller. They earned a bid to the 2010 CollegeInsider.com Postseason Tournament where they defeated George Mason in the first round before falling in the second round to Creighton.

== Roster ==
Number	Name	Position	Height	Weight	Year	Hometown
1	Jamal Turner	Guard	6–3	190	Sophomore	Boston, MA
3	Derek Needham	Guard	5–11	180	Freshman	Dolton, IL
4	Yorel Hawkins	Forward	6–5	207	Junior	Apex, NC
10	Jimmy O'Sullivan	Guard	6–2	170	Senior	Honeoye Falls, NY
11	Lyndon Jordan	Guard	6–2	180	Freshman	Winder, GA
12	Sean Crawford	Guard	5–10	150	Sophomore	Queens, NY
13	Gary Martin	Guard	6–2	180	Sophomore	Cleveland, OH
20	Sean Grzeck	Forward	6–7	217	Junior	Wilmington, NC
25	Colin Nickerson	Guard	6–3	150	Freshman	Waukegan, IL
32	Anthony Johnson	Forward	6–8	245	Senior	Lake Wales, FL
34	Ryan Olander	Forward	7–0	220	Sophomore	Mansfield, CT
41	Mike Evanovich	Forward	6–9	220	Senior	Storrs, CT

== Schedule ==
Date time, TV	Rank^{#}	Opponent^{#}	Result	Record	Site (attendance) city, state
Regular season
Nov 13, 2009*		Central Connecticut	W 67–58	1–0	Arena at Harbor Yard; Bridgeport, CT
Nov 15, 2009*		Fordham	W 63–55	2–0	Alumni Hall (2,190); Fairfield, CT
Nov 17, 2009*		at No. 25 Maryland	L 42–71	2–1	Comcast Center (16,227); College Park, MD
Nov 23, 2009*		at American	W 72–56	3–1	Bender Arena (1,033); Washington, D.C.
Nov 25, 2009*		at Howard	W 81–60	4–1	Burr Gymnasium (461); Washington, D.C.
Nov 30, 2009*		at Hofstra	L 80–84	4–2	Mack Sports Complex (2,146); Hempstead, NY
Dec 3, 2009		Marist	W 70–61	5–2 (1–0)	Arena at Harbor Yard (1,841); Bridgeport, CT
Dec 6, 2009		at Saint Peter's	W 61–48	6–2 (2–0)	Yanitelli Center (792); Newark, NJ
Dec 9, 2009*		Holy Cross	W 73–54	7–2	Alumni Hall (2,329); Fairfield, CT
Dec 13, 2009*		Sacred Heart	W 93–77	8–2	Arena at Harbor Yard (3,124); Bridgeport, CT
Dec 20, 2009*		at Rhode Island	L 84–89	8–3	Ryan Center (3,114); Kingston, RI
Dec 29, 2009*		St. Francis (NY)	W 65–58	9–3	Alumni Hall (1,960); Fairfield, CT
Jan 2, 2010		at Canisius	W 58–52	10–3 (3–0)	HSBC Arena (2,616); Buffalo, NY
Jan 4, 2010		at Niagara	L 68–77	10–4 (3–1)	Gallagher Center (1,292); Lewiston, NY
Jan 8, 2010		Loyola (MD)	W 65–60	11–4 (4–1)	Alumni Hall (2,025); Fairfield, CT
Jan 10, 2010		Manhattan	W 88–85	12–4 (5–1)	Arena at Harbor Yard (1,574); Bridgeport, CT
Jan 16, 2010		Siena	L 73–81	12–5 (5–2)	Arena at Harbor Yard (3,384); Bridgeport, CT
Jan 18, 2010		Canisius	W 76–74	13–5 (6–2)	Arena at Harbor Yard (1,826); Bridgeport, CT
Jan 21, 2010		at Marist	W 70–50	14–5 (7–2)	McCann Arena (1,775); Poughkeepsie, NY
Jan 24, 2010		at Iona	L 58–68	14–6 (7–3)	Hynes Athletics Center (1,524); New Rochelle, NY
Jan 28, 2010		at Loyola (MD)	W 73–69	15–6 (8–3)	Reitz Arena (1,212); Baltimore, MD
Jan 30, 2010		Rider	L 80–88	15–7 (8–4)	Arena at Harbor Yard (3,413); Bridgeport, CT
Feb 5, 2010		Saint Peter's	W 59–46	16–7 (9–4)	Arena at Harbor Yard (2,123); Bridgeport, CT
Feb 8, 2010		at Siena	L 67–69	16–8 (9–5)	Times Union Center (7,184); Albany, NY
Feb 12, 2010		at Rider	W 79–75 ^{OT}	17–8 (10–5)	Alumni Gymnasium (1,650); Lawrenceville, NJ
Feb 15, 2010		at Manhattan	W 74–56	18–8 (11–5)	Draddy Gymnasium (1,141); Bronx, NY
Feb 20, 2010*		at Vermont; ESPN BracketBusters	L 67–77	18–9	Patrick Gym (2,585); Burlington, VT
Feb 26, 2010		Iona	W 71–54	19–9 (12–5)	Arena at Harbor Yard (3,143); Bridgeport, CT
Feb 28, 2010		Niagara	W 80–74 ^{OT}	19–9 (13–5)	Arena at Harbor Yard (1,907); Bridgeport, CT
MAAC tournament
Mar 6, 2010	(2)	vs. (7) Canisius; Quarterfinals	W 67–57	21–9	Times Union Center; Albany, NY
Mar 7, 2010	(2)	vs. (6) Niagara; Semifinals	W 69–63	22–9	Times Union Center (8,250); Albany, NY
Mar 8, 2010	(2)	at (1) Siena; Finals	L 65–72 ^{OT}	22–10	Times Union Square (10,679); Albany, NY
CIT
Mar 16, 2010*		at George Mason; First Round	W 101–96 ^{OT}	23–10	Patriot Center (2,062); Fairfax, VA
Mar 22, 2010*		vs. Creighton; Quarterfinals	L 55–73	23–11	Omaha Civic Auditorium (3,824); Omaha, NE
*Non-conference game. ^{#}Rankings from AP Poll. (#) Tournament seedings in parentheses. C=NIT Colorado bracket. All times are in Eastern Time.
