= Emanuel Neto =

Angolan basketball player

Personal information
- Born: May 15, 1984 (age 42) Luanda, Angola
- Listed height: 206 cm (6.76 ft)
- Listed weight: 104 kg (229 lb)

Career information
- College: San Jacinto (2004–2006); Stony Brook (2006–2007)
- NBA draft: 2008: undrafted
- Position: Center
Medals
Men's Basketball
Representing Angola
FIBA Africa Under-18 Championship
| Silver medal – second place | Alexandria 2002 | Angola U18 |
FIBA Africa Clubs Champions Cup
| Silver medal – second place | Kigali 2009 | Petro Atlético |

Emanuel Neto (born 1984 in Luanda, Angola) is a 6'9" basketball center who attended Stony Brook University from 2006-07 after transferring from San Jacinto College. Neto was also a member of the Angola national basketball team which ranked 10th in the 2006 FIBA World Championship. During the 2006-2007 season for Stony Brook, Neto's first, he averaged 4.8 points per game and 5.6 rebounds. He had a career high in both points and rebounds on January 25, 2007. On that day against the University of Maine, Neto scored 13 points and grabbed 16 rebounds in 23 minutes while his squad lost 74-66.

== 2008 Summer Olympics ==
Neto was invited to join the Angolan national team for the 2008 Summer Olympics in Beijing, accepted the invitation, but was "banned" by the Republic of China, from participating in the summer Olympic games in Beijing, consequence of his very active role in the fight for peace in Sudan(Darfur), and involvement with Team Darfur.
