= 2010 MAAC men's basketball tournament =

- Classification: Division I
- Season: 2009–10
- Teams: 10
- Site: Times Union Center; Albany, New York
- Champions: Siena (5th title)
- Winning coach: Fran McCaffery (3rd title)
- MVP: Alex Franklin (Siena)
- Television: MSG, ESPN2

2009–10 MAAC men's basketball standings
	Conf.				Overall
Team	W		L	PCT	W		L	PCT
Siena †	17	–	1	.944	27	–	7	.794
Fairfield	13	–	5	.722	23	–	11	.676
Iona	12	–	6	.667	21	–	10	.677
Saint Peter's	11	–	7	.611	16	–	14	.533
Rider	9	–	9	.500	17	–	16	.515
Niagara	9	–	9	.500	18	–	15	.545
Canisius	8	–	10	.444	15	–	17	.469
Loyola	6	–	12	.333	13	–	17	.433
Manhattan	4	–	14	.222	11	–	20	.355
Marist	1	–	17	.056	1	–	29	.033
† 2010 MAAC tournament winner Rankings from AP Poll

The 2010 Metro Atlantic Athletic Conference men's basketball tournament took place from March 5–8, 2010 at the Times Union Center in Albany, New York. Siena was crowned with the Metro Atlantic Athletic Conference championship and its automatic bid into the 2010 NCAA tournament. Siena earned a 13 seed in the South Region where they lost to 4 seed and AP #10 Purdue in the first round 72-64.

== Bracket ==
First round Friday, March 5
8	Loyola (MD)	79
9	Manhattan	94
7	Canisius	72
10	Marist	54

Quarterfinals; Saturday, March 6
1	Siena	78
9	Manhattan	61
5	Rider	69
4	Saint Peter's	57
2	Fairfield	67
7	Canisius	57
6	Niagara	68
3	Iona	64

Semifinals; Sunday, March 7
1	Siena	72
5	Rider	62
2	Fairfield	69
6	Niagara	63

Final; Monday, March 8
1	Siena	72
2	Fairfield	65^{OT}
