= 2010 College Basketball Invitational =

College basketball tournament

- Teams: 16
- Finals site: Chaifetz Arena; Stuart C. Siegel Center; Saint Louis, Missouri; Richmond, Virginia
- Champions: VCU Rams (1st title)
- Runner-up: Saint Louis Billikens (1st title game)
- Semifinalists: Boston University Terriers (1st semifinal); Princeton (1st semifinal)
- Winning coach: Shaka Smart (1st title)
- MVP: Joey Rodriguez (VCU)

The 2010 College Basketball Invitational (CBI) is a single-elimination tournament of 16 National Collegiate Athletic Association (NCAA) Division I teams that did not participate in the 2010 NCAA Division I men's basketball tournament or the 2010 National Invitation Tournament. The opening round began Tuesday, March 16. A best-of-three championship series between the two teams in the final was held on March 29, March 31, and April 2. The tournament was won by VCU.

== Participants ==
=== Round 1 away teams ===
| School | Conference | Overall record | Conference record |
|---|---|---|---|
| Indiana State | Missouri Valley | 17–14 | 9–9 |
| Green Bay | Horizon | 21–12 | 11–7 |
| VCU | CAA | 22–9 | 11–7 |
| Charleston | Southern | 21–11 | 14–4 |
| Boston University | America East | 19–13 | 11–5 |
| Colorado State | Mountain West | 16–15 | 7–9 |
| IUPUI | The Summit League | 24–10 | 15–3 |
| Duquesne | Atlantic 10 | 16–15 | 7–9 |

=== Round 1 home teams ===
| School | Conference | Overall record | Conference record |
|---|---|---|---|
| Saint Louis | Atlantic 10 | 20–11 | 11–5 |
| Akron | MAC | 24–10 | 12–4 |
| George Washington | Atlantic 10 | 16–14 | 6–10 |
| Eastern Kentucky | Ohio Valley | 20–12 | 11–7 |
| Oregon State | Pac-10 | 14–17 | 8–10 |
| Morehead State | Ohio Valley | 23–10 | 15–3 |
| Hofstra | CAA | 19–14 | 10–8 |
| Princeton | Ivy League | 20–8 | 11–3 |

== Bracket ==
First round March 16–17
Saint Louis | 63
Indiana State | 54
Akron | 67
Green Bay | 70
George Washington | 73
VCU | 79
Eastern Kentucky | 79
College of Charleston | 82
Oregon State | 78
Boston University | 96
Morehead State | 74
Colorado State | 60
Hofstra | 60
IUPUI | 74
Princeton | 65
Duquesne | 51

Quarterfinals; March 22
Saint Louis | 68**
Green Bay | 62
VCU | 93
College of Charleston | 86
Boston University | 91*
Morehead State | 89
IUPUI | 68
Princeton | 74**

Semifinals (Reseeded); March 24
Saint Louis | 69
Princeton | 59
Boston University | 75
VCU | 88

Finals (Best of three); March 29, 31, April 2
Saint Louis | 56 | 65 | –
VCU | 68 | 71 | –

* Denotes overtime period.
