= Marqus Blakely =

American basketball player (born 1988)

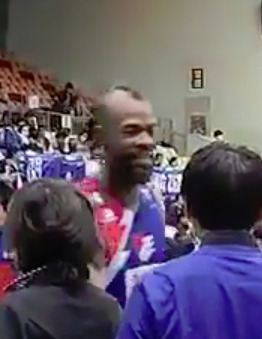
- Blakely in 2019

Personal information
- Born: October 22, 1988 (age 37) Metuchen, New Jersey, U.S.
- Listed height: 6 ft 5 in (1.96 m)
- Listed weight: 231 lb (105 kg)

Career information
- High school: Metuchen (Metuchen, New Jersey)
- College: Vermont (2006–2010)
- NBA draft: 2010: undrafted
- Playing career: 2010–2020
- Position: Shooting guard / small forward

Career history
- 2010–2011: Bakersfield Jam
- 2011–2012: Iowa Energy
- 2012: Sioux Falls Skyforce
- 2012: B-Meg Llamados
- 2013: Neckar Riesen Ludwigsburg
- 2013–2015: San Mig Coffee Mixers / San Mig Super Coffee Mixers / Star Hotshots
- 2015–2016: Busan KT Sonicboom
- 2016: Star Hotshots
- 2018: TNT KaTropa
- 2018: Hyundai Phoebus
- 2018–2019: Shiga Lakestars
- 2019: Rizing Zephyr Fukuoka
- 2019: Blackwater Elite
- 2020: Kumamoto Volters

Career highlights
- South Korean League Defensive Player of the Year (2016); 2× PBA champion (2013 Governors', 2014 Governors'); PBA Best Import (2013 Governors'); 2× America East Player of the Year (2009, 2010); 3× First-team All-America East (2008–2010); 3× America East Defensive Player of the Year (2008–2010); 3× America East All-Defensive Team (2008–2010); America East tournament MVP (2010)
- Stats at NBA.com
- Stats at Basketball Reference

Marqus Austin Blakely (born October 22, 1988) is an American former professional basketball player. He played college basketball for Vermont.

== College career ==
Blakely gained a reputation at Vermont by winning the Kevin Roberson America East Conference Men's Basketball Player of the Year twice and the America East Defensive Player of the Year Award three times. He earned national recognition by winning the 2010 State Farm Division I College Basketball Slam Dunk Contest. He performed a dunk invented by then teammate Evan Fjeld that had never been done before. The dunk is now widely known as the "Double Dunk" where Fjeld dunked the ball from the right side and Blakely caught the ball out of the bottom of the net and dunked it back in mid-air. He also performed three dunks that appeared on ESPN SportsCenter's Top Plays.

He finished his senior season at Vermont by leading the America East in steals (2.6 pg) and blocks (1.9 pg), finishing second in points (17.4 pg), rebounds (9.1 pg) and field goal percentage (54.1%), and came in fourth in assists (3.7 pg). He finished his career with the Catamounts ranked fifth all-time in scoring (1,875), second in rebounding (1,044) and steals (226), third in blocks (254), and 10th in assists (304). He helped lead Vermont to a 25–10 record as a senior and a trip to the NCAA tournament.

Following the season Blakely was also one of only 64 seniors in the nation to take part in the Portsmouth Invitational Tournament, helping lead his team to a championship.

== Professional career ==
After going undrafted in the 2010 NBA draft, Blakely joined the Los Angeles Clippers for the 2010 NBA Summer League. On July 26, 2010, he signed with Clippers on a reported two-year partially guaranteed contract worth $473,604 per year. He was later waived by the Clippers on October 25, 2010.

=== Bakersfield Jam (2010–2011) ===
After his release from the Clippers, Blakely was acquired by the Bakersfield Jam with the 12th overall pick in the 2010 NBA D-League Draft. He appeared in 25 games for the Jam, before a mid-season trade with the Iowa Energy.

=== Iowa Energy (2011) ===
In January 2011, Blakely was traded to the Iowa Energy. Blakely averaged 17.2 points per game and 6.6 rebounds per game for the Energy.

=== Houston Rockets (2011) ===
On April 13, 2011, Blakely signed with the Houston Rockets. He suited up for the Rockets in their final game of the regular season, but did not play. Blakely entered training camp with the Rockets following the resolution of the NBA Lockout for the 2011–12 preseason, but was released on December 19, 2011.

=== Returned to Iowa Energy (2011–2012) / Sioux Falls Skyforce (2012) ===
On December 27, 2011, Blakely was re-acquired by the Iowa Energy of the NBA D-League, appearing in 14 games before being traded to the Sioux Falls Skyforce in February 2012, where he averaged 16 points per game and 7 rebounds per contest while also being named an NBA D-League All-Star.

=== B-Meg Llamados (2012) ===
After the NBA D-League season was completed, Blakely signed as an import player for the B-Meg Llamados of the Philippine Basketball Association (PBA) for the 2012 PBA Governors' Cup. While with B-Meg, Blakely averaged a double-double (22.3 points per game and 13.3 rebounds per game), guiding the team to the Governors' Cup final, falling 4–3 in a seven-game series.

=== Los Angeles Clippers (2012) ===
In September 2012, Blakely signed with Los Angeles Clippers. He appeared in three preseason games, but failed to score a point. On October 27, 2012, Blakely was waived by the Clippers.

=== Telekom Baskets Bonn (2012) ===
On December 26, 2012, Blakely signed with Telekom Baskets Bonn of the Basketball Bundesliga. After failing some medical tests, he was waived on January 1, 2013.

=== Neckar Riesen Ludwigsburg (2013) ===
In January 2013, he signed with Neckar Riesen Ludwigsburg of Germany.

=== San Mig Coffee Mixers / Purefoods Star Hotshots (2013–2015) ===
After his season in Germany ended, Blakely signed to play as an import in his return to B-Meg (this time renamed as the San Mig Coffee Mixers). Blakely helped the San Mig Coffee Mixers defeat Petron Blaze Boosters in the 2013 Governor's Cup finals. However, the finals were tainted by monkey chants shouted against him from Petron fans. He was expected to return the following year as the import for the Mixers.

Blakely signed again as San Mig's import, now renamed as the San Mig Super Coffee Mixers for the third time. He led the Mixers to clinch a historic Grand Slam. It was also San Mig Coffee's fourth consecutive championship. Along with the Mixers' "Big 3" of James Yap, Marc Pingris and PJ Simon, they defeated the Rain or Shine Elasto Painters on a do or die game at a best-of-5 championship series of the 2014 PBA Governors' Cup.

He came back again as the team's import for the fourth time for the franchise, this time again renamed as the Purefoods Star Hotshots for the 2015 PBA Commissioner's Cup, serving as their temporary import while Purefoods Star could find a suitable fit for the team. However, Blakely still stayed with the team as a practice player when the team was able to find a suitable replacement for the team and played as the team's regular import in the following conference, the 2015 Governors' Cup.

=== Busan KT Sonicboom (2015–2016) ===
Blakely was signed by Busan KT Sonicboom of the Korean Basketball League.

=== Star Hotshots (2016) ===
Blakely returned to the Philippines, this time playing again for the renamed-again Star Hotshots as the team's import for the 2016 PBA Governors' Cup. It was Blakely's sixth conference playing in the PBA and for the team.

On August 6, 2016, Blakely was released by the team due to the team's disappointing performance with him. He was replaced by Joel Wright.

=== TNT KaTropa (2018) ===
In 2018, he signed with TNT KaTropa. In his debut with the Katropa, Blakely almost recorded a triple-double after posting 26 points, 14 rebounds and 8 assists in a 110–104 win over the Rain or Shine Elasto Painters.

=== Japan (2018–2019) ===
After his stint with the TNT Katropa, he signed a deal with the Japanese team Shiga Lakestars. However, he left the team after just appearing for them for 13 games. After leaving, he signed a contract with another Japanese team, Fukuoka Zephyr. In his second game with Fukuoka, he recorded a triple-double of 37 points, 11 rebounds and a career-high 12 assists in a 105–108 loss to the Kawasaki Brave Thunders.

=== Blackwater Elite (2019) ===
During the Governors Cup back in 2019, he signed with the Blackwater Elite. He scored a conference-high 37 points to go along with 17 rebounds and 6 assists in a 117–120 loss to the Phoenix Fuel Masters.

=== Kumamoto Volters (2020) ===
After his stint with the Blackwater Elite, he signed with the Japanese team, Kumamoto Volters of the Japanese Basketball League. On January 29, 2020, Blakely recorded a triple-double of 24 points, 16 rebounds and 11 assists against Fukuoka.

== Player profile ==
Blakely recorded 4 triple-doubles throughout his entire career. He averaged 9.5 rebounds per game for his career.

== Professional career statistics ==
Legend
GP	Games played	MPG	Minutes per game	FG%	Field goal percentage
3P%	3-point field goal percentage	FT%	Free throw percentage	RPG	Rebounds per game
APG	Assists per game	SPG	Steals per game	BPG	Blocks per game
PPG	Points per game	**Bold**	Career high		Led the league

Year	Team	League	GP	MPG	FG%	3P%	FT%	RPG	APG	SPG	BPG	PPG
2010–11	Bakersfield Jam/Iowa	NBA D-League	49	25.2	**.625**	.167	.636	6.4	1.2	1.5	.8	15.0
2011–12	Sioux Falls/Iowa	NBA D-League	35	31.1	.522	.231	.566	6.4	2.7	1.8	1.3	15.1
2011–12	B-Meg	PBA	22	41.0	.437	.362	**.641**	13.4	3.3	2.7	2.6	22.4
2012–13	San Mig Coffee	PBA	21	**42.8**	.488	.239	.459	15.5	4.5	2.1	2.2	**23.9**
2012–13	MHP Riesen Ludwigsburg	Bundesliga	11	23.6	.516	**.429**	.544	6.5	2.2	.7	1.2	11.5
2013–14	San Mig Coffee	PBA	20	39.4	.483	.008	.547	15.7	3.9	1.8	2.4	19.2
2014–15	Star Hotshots	PBA	19	38.5	.543	.143	.635	12.7	4.3	2.9	2.7	21.9
2015–16	Busan KT Sonicboom	KBL	53	20.9	.540	.172	.589	6.9	3.0	1.5	1.1	13.8
2015–16	Star Hotshots	PBA	4	41.0	.482	.000	.529	**17.5**	4.5	2.5	1.8	18.0
2016–17	Hyundai Mobis Phoebus	KBL	11	26.2	.525	.200	.510	9.8	5.4	1.3	1.5	18.0
2017–18	TNT Katropa	PBA	5	41.0	.575	.364	.614	15.2	**6.6**	2.2	1.2	23.0
2017–18	Hyundai Mobis Phoebus	KBL	**58**	25.8	.571	.235	.562	8.5	3.3	1.2	.8	14.4
2018–19	Blackwater Elite	PBA	10	36.7	.504	.400	.632	13.1	5.6	**3.5**	**2.9**	18.0
2018–19	Shiga/Fukuoka	B.League	25	35.2	.426	.333	.610	9.6	5.8	2.3	.5	17.3
2019–20	Kumamoto Volters	B.League	14	35.6	.554	.290	.612	9.4	5.4	2.4	1.8	21.4
Career		All Leagues	357	30.6	.524	.270	.575	9.5	3.5	1.8	1.4	16.9
