= Kansas State Wildcats men's basketball statistical leaders =

The Kansas State Wildcats men's basketball statistical leaders are individual statistical leaders of the Kansas State Wildcats men's basketball program in various categories, including points, rebounds, assists, steals, and blocks. Within those areas, the lists identify single-game, single-season, and career leaders. The Wildcats represent Kansas State University in the NCAA Division I Big 12 Conference.

Kansas State began competing in intercollegiate basketball in 1902. However, the school's record book does not generally list records from before the 1950s, as records from before this period are often incomplete and inconsistent. Since scoring was much lower in this era, and teams played much fewer games during a typical season, it is likely that few or no players from this era would appear on these lists anyway.

The NCAA did not officially record assists as a stat until the 1983–84 season, and blocks and steals until the 1985–86 season, but Kansas State's record books includes players in these stats before these seasons.

These lists are updated through the 2022–23 season.

== Scoring ==
Career
Rank	Player	Points	Seasons
1	Jacob Pullen	2,132	2007–08 2008–09 2009–10 2010–11
2	Mike Evans	2,115	1974–75 1975–76 1976–77 1977–78
3	Rolando Blackman	1,844	1977–78 1978–79 1979–80 1980–81
4	Askia Jones	1,834	1990–91 1991–92 1992–93 1993–94
5	Barry Brown Jr.	1,781	2015–16 2016–17 2017–18 2018–19
6	Bob Boozer	1,685	1956–57 1957–58 1958–59
7	Steve Henson	1,655	1986–87 1987–88 1988–89 1989–90
8	Rodney McGruder	1,576	2009–10 2010–11 2011–12 2012–13
9	Cartier Martin	1,546	2003–04 2004–05 2005–06 2006–07
10	Dean Wade	1,510	2015–16 2016–17 2017–18 2018–19

Season
Rank	Player	Points	Season
1	Michael Beasley	866	2007–08
2	Mitch Richmond	786	1987–88
3	Askia Jones	729	1993–94
4	P.J. Haggerty	725	2025–26
5	Jacob Pullen	715	2009–10
6	Bob Boozer	691	1958–59
7	Willie Murrell	648	1963–64
8	Chuckie Williams	640	1974–75
9	Markquis Nowell	633	2022–23
10	Keyontae Johnson	627	2022–23

Single game
Rank	Player	Points	Season	Opponent
1	Askia Jones	62	1993–94	Fresno State
2	Chuckie Williams	47	1975–76	Holy Cross
3	Mike Wroblewski	46	1961–62	Kansas
4	Bob Boozer	45	1958–59	Purdue
5	Michael Beasley	44	2007–08	Baylor
	Denis Clemente	44	2008–09	Texas
7	Dick Knostman	42	1952–53	Oklahoma
8	Mitch Richmond	41	1987–88	Oklahoma
	Steve Henson	41	1989–90	Iowa State
10	Mike Evans	40	1976–77	Colorado
	Michael Beasley	40	2007–08	Winston-Salem State
	Michael Beasley	40	2007–08	Missouri

== Rebounds ==
Career
Rank	Player	Rebounds	Seasons
1	Ed Nealy	1,069	1978–79 1979–80 1980–81 1981–82
2	Jack Parr	889	1955–56 1956–57 1957–58
3	David Hall	827	1969–70 1970–71 1971–72
4	Bob Boozer	824	1956–57 1957–58 1958–59
5	Dick Knostman	774	1950–51 1951–52 1952–53
6	Jamar Samuels	716	2008–09 2009–10 2010–11 2011–12
7	Thomas Gipson	700	2011–12 2012–13 2013–14 2014–15
8	Dean Wade	684	2015–16 2016–17 2017–18 2018–19
9	Rodney McGruder	654	2009–10 2010–11 2011–12 2012–13
10	Steve Mitchell	649	1970–71 1971–72 1972–73

Season
Rank	Player	Rebounds	Season
1	Michael Beasley	408	2007–08
2	Jack Parr	340	1955–56
3	Willie Murrell	321	1963–64
4	Dick Knostman	319	1951–52
5	Larry Comley	315	1960–61
6	Bob Boozer	306	1958–59
7	Ed Nealy	301	1980–81
8	Gene Williams	298	1968–69
9	Deryl Cunningham	295	1993–94
10	Jack Parr	290	1956–57

Single game
Rank	Player	Rebounds	Season	Opponent
1	David Hall	27	1970–71	Oklahoma
2	Jack Parr	26	1956–57	Drake
	Hayden Abbott	26	1957–58	Iowa State
4	Nick Pino	24	1967–68	Creighton
	Michael Beasley	24	2007–08	Sacramento State
6	Dick Knostman	23	1952–53	Oklahoma
	Bob Boozer	23	1956–57	Colorado
	Larry Comley	23	1960–61	Colorado State
	Nick Pino	23	1965–66	Indiana
10	Dick Knostman	22	1951–52	Iowa State
	Jack Parr	22	1955–56	Wyoming
	Bob Boozer	22	1958–59	Indiana
	Cedric Price	22	1960–61	Missouri
	Michael Beasley	22	2007–08	Western Illinois

== Assists ==
Career
Rank	Player	Assists	Seasons
1	Steve Henson	582	1986–87 1987–88 1988–89 1989–90
2	Jacob Pullen	455	2007–08 2008–09 2009–10 2010–11
3	Markquis Nowell	433	2021–22 2022–23
4	Kamau Stokes	415	2015–16 2016–17 2017–18 2018–19
5	Clent Stewart	395	2004–05 2005–06 2006–07 2007–08
6	Wesley Iwundu	366	2013–14 2014–15 2015–16 2016–17
7	Barry Brown Jr.	350	2015–16 2016–17 2017–18 2018–19
8	Will Spradling	331	2010–11 2011–12 2012–13 2013–14
9	Tyrone Adams	323	1978–79 1979–80 1980–81 1981–82
10	Rolando Blackman	320	1977–78 1978–79 1979–80 1980–81

Season
Rank	Player	Assists	Season
1	Markquis Nowell	297	2022–23
2	Steve Henson	186	1987–88
3	Angel Rodriguez	173	2012–13
4	Jim Roder	163	1983–84
5	Dug McDaniel	158	2024–25
6	Denis Clemente	154	2009–10
7	Anthony Beane	153	1993–94
8	Larry Reid	149	2001–02
9	Tylor Perry	148	2023–24
10	Frank Richards	146	2002–03
	Nate Johnson	146	2025–26

Single game
Rank	Player	Assists	Season	Opponent
1	Markquis Nowell	19	2022–23	Michigan State
2	Keith Frazier	16	1976–77	Central Missouri
3	Tim Jankovich	14	1980–81	Kansas
	Markquis Nowell	14	2022–23	Baylor
	Markquis Nowell	14	2022–23	Montana State
6	Jim Roder	13	1983–84	Kansas
7	Steve Henson	12	1986–87	Colorado
	Steve Henson	12	1987–88	Purdue
	Steve Henson	12	1988–89	Oklahoma State
	Markquis Nowell	12	2022–23	Rhode Island
	Markquis Nowell	12	2022–23	Abilene Christian
	Markquis Nowell	12	2022–23	Florida Atlantic

== Steals ==
Career
Rank	Player	Steals	Seasons
1	Barry Brown Jr.	254	2015–16 2016–17 2017–18 2018–19
2	Jacob Pullen	210	2007–08 2008–09 2009–10 2010–11
3	Xavier Sneed	195	2016–17 2017–18 2018–19 2019–20
4	Steve Henson	190	1986–87 1987–88 1988–89 1989–90
5	Markquis Nowell	151	2021–22 2022–23
6	Kamau Stokes	135	2015–16 2016–17 2017–18 2018–19
7	Askia Jones	133	1990–91 1991–92 1992–93 1993–94
8	Will Spradling	128	2010–11 2011–12 2012–13 2013–14
9	Wesley Iwundu	121	2013–14 2014–15 2015–16 2016–17
10	Ed Nealy	118	1978–79 1979–80 1980–81 1981–82
	Elliot Hatcher	118	1994–95 1995–96
	Dean Wade	118	2015–16 2016–17 2017–18 2018–19
	Mike McGuirl	118	2017–18 2018–19 2019–20 2020–21 2021–22

Season
Rank	Player	Steals	Season
1	Markquis Nowell	92	2022–23
2	Barry Brown Jr.	82	2016–17
3	Nate Johnson	71	2025–26
4	Jacob Pullen	67	2009–10
	Barry Brown Jr.	67	2017–18
6	Jeff Wires	66	1990–91
7	Elliot Hatcher	65	1995–96
	Barry Brown Jr.	65	2018–19
9	Steve Henson	62	1989–90
	Fred Peete	62	2004–05

Single game
Rank	Player	Steals	Season	Opponent
1	Lynn Smith	8	1986–87	South Dakota
	Elliot Hatcher	8	1995–96	Wichita State
	Dominique Sutton	8	2008–09	Idaho State
4	Scott Langton	7	1977–78	Vanderbilt
	Tyrone Adams	7	1981–82	Northern Iowa
	Tyrone Adams	7	1981–82	Auburn-Montgomery
	LaKeith Humphrey	7	1988–89	Nebraska
	Steve Henson	7	1989–90	Western Kentucky
	Markquis Nowell	7	2021–22	TCU
	Markquis Nowell	7	2022–23	West Virginia

== Blocks ==
Career
Rank	Player	Blocks	Seasons
1	Jordan Henriquez	210	2009–10 2010–11 2011–12 2012–13
2	Manny Dies	121	1995–96 1996–97 1997–98 1998–99
3	Shawn Rhodes	120	1995–96 1996–97 1997–98 1998–99
4	D.J. Johnson	110	2012–13 2013–14 2015–16 2016–17
5	Curtis Kelly	107	2009–10 2010–11
6	Gerald Eaker	103	1995–96 1996–97
7	Les Craft	101	1979–80 1980–81 1981–82 1982–83
8	Jamar Samuels	93	2008–09 2009–10 2010–11 2011–12
9	Pervis Pasco	92	2001–02 2002–03
	Makol Mawien	92	2017–18 2018–19 2019–20

Season
Rank	Player	Blocks	Season
1	Jordan Henriquez	77	2011–12
2	Curtis Kelly	74	2009–10
3	Jordan Henriquez	64	2012–13
4	Gerald Eaker	59	1995–96
5	Michael Beasley	54	2007–08
6	D.J. Johnson	52	2016–17
7	Jason Bennett	50	2006–07
8	Manny Dies	49	1997–98
9	Kelvin Howell	48	2000–01
10	Tony Kitt	46	1999–00
	Pervis Pasco	46	2001–02
	Pervis Pasco	46	2002–03

Single game
Rank	Player	Blocks	Season	Opponent
1	Jason Bennett	8	2006–07	Chicago State
2	Jordan Henriquez	7	2011–12	Iowa State
3	Tony Kitt	6	1998–99	Kansas
	Dramane Diarra	6	2005–06	Stephen F. Austin
	Jason Bennett	6	2006–07	California
	Curtis Kelly	6	2009–10	South Dakota
	Curtis Kelly	6	2010–11	Texas A&M
	Jordan Henriquez	6	2011–12	Kansas
	Jordan Henriquez	6	2011–12	Southern Miss
	Jordan Henriquez	6	2012–13	Lamar
