= 2009–10 Kansas State Wildcats men's basketball team =

American college basketball season

2009–10 Kansas State Wildcats men's basketball

NCAA tournament, Elite Eight
- Conference: Big 12 Conference

Ranking
- Coaches: No. 7
- AP: No. 7
- Record: 29–8 (11–5 Big 12)
- Head coach: Frank Martin
- Assistant coaches: Matt Figger; Dalonte Hill; Brad Underwood
- Home arena: Bramlage Coliseum (12,500)

2009–10 Big 12 men's basketball standings
	Conf.				Overall
Team	W		L	PCT	W		L	PCT
No. 1 Kansas†	15	–	1	.938	33	–	3	.917
No. 7 Kansas State	11	–	5	.688	29	–	8	.784
No. 19 Baylor	11	–	5	.688	28	–	8	.778
No. 23 Texas A&M	11	–	5	.688	24	–	10	.706
Missouri	10	–	6	.625	23	–	11	.676
Texas	9	–	7	.563	24	–	10	.706
Oklahoma State	9	–	7	.563	22	–	11	.667
Colorado	6	–	10	.375	15	–	16	.484
Texas Tech	4	–	12	.250	19	–	16	.543
Iowa State	4	–	12	.250	15	–	17	.469
Oklahoma	4	–	12	.250	13	–	18	.419
Nebraska	2	–	14	.125	15	–	18	.455
† 2010 Big 12 Tournament winner Rankings from AP poll

The 2009–10 Kansas State Wildcats men's basketball team represented Kansas State University in the 2009–10 NCAA Division I men's basketball season. The head coach was Frank Martin, who served his 3rd year at the helm of the Wildcats. The team played its home games in Bramlage Coliseum in Manhattan, Kansas. Kansas State is a member of the Big 12 Conference. The Wildcats began conference play with a trip to Columbia, Missouri and faced the Missouri Tigers and finished the year with a home game against the Iowa State Cyclones. They finished the season 29–8 and ranked #7 in the AP Poll and the ESPN/USA Today Coaches' Poll. They lost to the rival Kansas Jayhawks in the finals of the Big 12 tournament, 72–64.

The team received a #2 seed for the 2010 NCAA Division I men's basketball tournament, and beat North Texas and BYU to advance to the Sweet Sixteen, where the Wildcats faced Xavier. The KSU-Xavier game was a double-overtime thriller won by Kansas State 101–96, which CBSSports.com called "one of the best games in the history of the Sweet 16." Kansas State lost in the next round to Butler.

== Recruiting ==
The following is a list of the recruits that are on the 2009-10 roster.

College recruiting information
Name	Hometown	School	Height	Weight	Commit date
Jordan Henriquez; C	Winchendon, Massachusetts	The Winchendon School	6 ft 11 in (2.11 m)	220 lb (100 kg)	May 27, 2008
Jordan Henriquez; C	Recruit ratings: Scout: Rivals: (91)				
Martavious Irving; PG	Lauderdale Lakes, Florida	Boyd H. Anderson HS	6 ft 2 in (1.88 m)	190 lb (86 kg)	Apr 29, 2009
Martavious Irving; PG	Recruit ratings: Scout: Rivals: (86)				
Wally Judge; PF	Jacksonville, Florida	Arlington Country Day School	6 ft 8 in (2.03 m)	210 lb (95 kg)	Oct 16, 2007
Wally Judge; PF	Recruit ratings: Scout: Rivals: (97)				
Rodney McGruder; SG	Jacksonville, Florida	Arlington Country Day School	6 ft 4 in (1.93 m)	187 lb (85 kg)	Oct 18, 2007
Rodney McGruder; SG	Recruit ratings: Scout: Rivals: (89)				
Nick Russell; SG	Arlington, Texas	Grace Preparatory Academy	6 ft 4 in (1.93 m)	180 lb (82 kg)	Oct 26, 2008
Nick Russell; SG	Recruit ratings: Scout: Rivals: (89)				
Overall recruit ranking: Scout: 28 Rivals: 20 ESPN: 16
Note: In many cases, Scout, Rivals, 247Sports, On3, and ESPN may conflict in their listings of height and weight.; In these cases, the average was taken. ESPN grades are on a 100-point scale.; Sources: "2009 Kansas State Basketball Commits". Rivals.; "2009 Kansas State Basketball Commits". Scout.; "2009 Kansas State Basketball Commits". ESPN.; "Scout.com Team Recruiting Rankings". Scout.; "2009 Team Ranking". Rivals.

== Schedule ==
Date time, TV	Rank^{#}	Opponent^{#}	Result	Record	Site (attendance) city, state
Exhibition
11/08/2009*; 3:00 pm, FSKC		Pittsburg State	W 89–53	—	Bramlage Coliseum (12,566); Manhattan, Kansas
Regular Season
11/13/2009*; 7:00 pm, FSKC		Loyola Chicago	W 92–54	1–0	Bramlage Coliseum (12,528); Manhattan, Kansas
11/15/2009*; 3:00 pm, FSKC		Western Illinois	W 82–50	2–0	Bramlage Coliseum (12,528); Manhattan, Kansas
11/19/2008*; 6:30 pm		vs. Boston University; Puerto Rico Tip-Off Quarterfinals	W 80–70	3–0	José Miguel Agrelot Coliseum (5,073); San Juan, PR
11/20/2009*; 7:30 pm, ESPNU		vs. Ole Miss; Puerto Rico Tip-Off Semifinals	L 74–86	3–1	José Miguel Agrelot Coliseum (5,762); San Juan, PR
11/22/2009*; 4:30 pm, ESPNU		vs. No. 18 Dayton; Puerto Rico Tip-Off 3rd Place Game	W 83–75	4–1	José Miguel Agrelot Coliseum (8,357); San Juan, PR
11/28/2009*; 3:00 pm, FSKC		vs. IUPUI; K-State Holiday Classic	W 70–57	5–1	Sprint Center (7,053); Kansas City, Missouri
12/01/2009*; 7:00 pm, FSKC		Fort Hays State	W 83–76	6–1	Bramlage Coliseum (12,528); Manhattan, Kansas
12/05/2009*; 8:00 pm, ESPNU		Washington State; Big 12/Pac-10 Hardwood Series	W 86–69	7–1	Bramlage Coliseum (12,528); Manhattan, Kansas
12/08/2009*; 8:00 pm, ESPNU		Xavier	W 71–56	8–1	Bramlage Coliseum (12,528); Manhattan, Kansas
12/12/2009*; 6:00 pm, FSKC		vs. No. 18 UNLV	W 95–80	9–1	Orleans Arena (8,320); Paradise, Nevada
12/19/2009*; 8:00 pm, Cox	No. 17	vs. Alabama; Coors Classic	W 87–74	10–1	Mitchell Center (5,192); Mobile, AL
12/21/2009*; 7:00 pm, FSKC	No. 12	Arkansas–Pine Bluff	W 90–76	11–1	Bramlage Coliseum (9,134); Manhattan, Kansas
12/29/2009*; 7:00 pm, FSKC	No. 12	Cleveland State	W 85–56	12–1	Bramlage Coliseum (12,528); Manhattan, Kansas
01/03/2010*; 12:00 pm, FSKC	No. 12	South Dakota	W 91–69	13–1	Bramlage Coliseum (10,441); Manhattan, Kansas
01/09/2010; 1:00 pm, ESPN2	No. 11	at Missouri	L 68–74	13–2 (0–1)	Mizzou Arena (13,824); Columbia, Missouri
01/12/2010; 6:00 pm, ESPN2	No. 13	Texas A&M	W 88–65	14–2 (1–1)	Bramlage Coliseum (12,528); Manhattan, Kansas
01/16/2010; 3:00 pm, B12N	No. 13	at Colorado	W 87–81	15–2 (2–1)	Coors Events Center (10,852); Boulder, Colorado
01/18/2010; 8:00 pm, ESPN	No. 10	No. 1 Texas	W 71-62	16–2 (3–1)	Bramlage Coliseum (12,528); Manhattan, Kansas
01/23/2010; 3:00 pm, B12N	No. 10	Oklahoma State	L 69–73	16–3 (3–2)	Bramlage Coliseum (12,528); Manhattan, Kansas
01/26/2010; 7:00 pm, FSKC	No. 11	at No. 24 Baylor	W 76–74	17–3 (4–2)	Ferrell Center (8,833); Waco, Texas
01/30/2010; 6:00 pm, ESPN	No. 11	No. 2 Kansas; Sunflower Showdown, ESPN College GameDay	L 79–81 ^{OT}	17–4 (4–3)	Bramlage Coliseum (12,528); Manhattan, Kansas
02/02/2010; 7:00 pm, B12N	No. 10	at Nebraska	W 76–57	18–4 (5–3)	Bob Devaney Sports Center (10,453); Lincoln, Nebraska
02/06/2010; 1:00 pm, ESPN2	No. 10	at Iowa State	W 79–75	19–4 (6–3)	Hilton Coliseum (12,649); Ames, Iowa
02/13/2010; 5:00 pm, B12N	No. 9	Colorado	W 68–51	20–4 (7–3)	Bramlage Coliseum (12,528); Manhattan, Kansas
02/17/2010; 6:00 pm, FSKC	No. 7	Nebraska	W 91–87	21–4 (8–3)	Bramlage Coliseum (12,528); Manhattan, Kansas
02/20/2010; 5:00 pm, ESPNU	No. 7	at Oklahoma	W 83–68	22–4 (9–3)	Lloyd Noble Center (12,425); Norman, Oklahoma
02/23/2010; 7:00 pm, B12N	No. 6	at Texas Tech	W 83–64	23–4 (10–3)	United Spirit Arena (9,447); Lubbock, Texas
02/27/2010; 7:00 pm, ESPNU	No. 6	Missouri	W 63–53	24–4 (11–3)	Bramlage Coliseum (12,528); Manhattan, Kansas
03/03/2010; 7:00 pm, B12N	No. 5	at No. 2 Kansas; Sunflower Showdown	L 65–82	24–5 (11–4)	Allen Fieldhouse (16,300); Lawrence, Kansas
03/06/2010; 5:00 pm, B12N	No. 5	Iowa State	L 82–85 ^{OT}	24–6 (11–5)	Bramlage Coliseum (12,528); Manhattan, Kansas
Big 12 tournament
03/11/2010; 6:00 pm, B12N	(2) No. 9	vs. (7) Oklahoma State; Big 12 Quarterfinals	W 83–64	25–6	Sprint Center (18,879); Kansas City, Missouri
03/12/2010; 8:30 pm, B12N	(2) No. 9	vs. (3) No. 21 Baylor; Big 12 Semifinals	W 82–75	26–6	Sprint Center (18,879); Kansas City, Missouri
03/13/2010; 5:00 pm, ESPN	(2) No. 9	vs. (1) No. 1 Kansas; Big 12 Championship Game	L 64–72	26–7	Sprint Center (19,003); Kansas City, Missouri
NCAA tournament
03/18/2010*; 1:50 pm, CBS	(2 W) No. 7	vs. (15 W) North Texas; NCAA First Round	W 82–62	27–7	Ford Center (13,382); Oklahoma City
03/20/2010*; 7:10 pm, CBS	(2 W) No. 7	vs. (7 W) No. 17 Brigham Young; NCAA Second Round	W 84–72	28–7	Ford Center (15,668); Oklahoma City, Oklahoma
03/25/2010*; 8:37 pm, CBS	(2 W) No. 7	vs. (6 W) No. 25 Xavier; NCAA Sweet Sixteen	W 101–96 ^{2OT}	29–7	EnergySolutions Arena (17,254); Salt Lake City
03/27/2010*; 3:30 pm, CBS	(2 W) No. 7	vs. (5) No. 11 Butler; NCAA Elite Eight	L 56–63	29–8	EnergySolutions Arena (17,587); Salt Lake City
*Non-conference game. ^{#}Rankings from AP Poll. (#) Tournament seedings in parentheses. W=NCAA West Regional. All times are in Central Time.

== Record breaking season ==
Kansas State earned its highest ranking since the 1987–88 season on December 14, as the Wildcats jumped into The Associated Press Top 25 poll for the first time this season at No. 17. K-State also appeared in the ESPN/USA Today poll at No. 22. The team had been receiving votes in both polls since the preseason. The Wildcats are ranked for the first time in the AP poll since the 2007–08 season when the squad was ranked No. 24 on Feb. 19, 2008. K-State appeared in the poll eight times during the season, including 18th twice on Nov. 20, 2007 and Feb. 12, 2008. The last time the team was ranked as high or higher than 17th was during the 1987-88 when the Wildcats were 14th on Feb. 9, 1988. It is also the highest ranking prior to conference play since K-State was ranked No. 14 in the preseason poll in 1975.

On December 21, Kansas State's rise in the polls reached historical levels, as the Wildcats earned their highest ranking in nearly 36 years on Monday at number 12 in The Associated Press Top 25. Those rankings marked the first ranking since the 2007-08 season when the team checked in at number 24 on Feb. 19, 2008. It is the highest ranking in the AP poll since head coach Jack Hartman led the Wildcats to a number 9 ranking in the poll on March 13, 1973, with a 23-5 record. In addition, it is the highest ranking prior to conference play since K-State was ranked No. 10 in the preseason poll in 1965. The two wins over ranked non-conference teams are a first since the 1958-59 squad knocked off number 4 N.C. State (69-67) and number 14 St. Joseph's (68-55) on consecutive days on Dec. 19-20, 1958. The eight 80-point games after 11 games are the most in school history.

With the win over Cleveland State on December 29, the Wildcats moved to 12-1 on the season and are off to their best start since the 1958–59 squad also began 12-1. Also, the last time a K-State team won nine games in a row was back in 1997-98, when that squad won its first nine games of the season.

On January 12, Kansas State beat Texas A&M 88-65. The victory set a new record for consecutive home wins at Bramlage Coliseum with 13. The school record for consecutive home victories is 20, which occurred in Ahearn Fieldhouse that stretched from January 1981 to January 1982.

On February 15, Kansas State rose to a number 7 ranking. It is the highest in The Associated Press poll in almost 50 years since the Wildcats were ranked sixth on March 13, 1962. It is the highest ranking in the Coaches' poll since USA Today took over ownership of the poll in 1991-92.

The Wildcats have now been ranked among the nation's Top 25 in both polls for 10 consecutive weeks, while they have been ranked among the AP Top 15 for seven straight weeks. It is the longest stretch in the Top 25 since ranking 16 consecutive weeks in the AP poll from 1972–73, while it is the longest stretch in the AP Top 15 since the 1961–62 team was among the Top 10 for 14 weeks in a row from Dec. 19, 1961 to March 13, 1962. Kansas State is off to its best start in nearly 50 years with a 20-4 overall mark. The record ties for the fifth-best start in school history and the best since the 1961–62 squad opened the year at 21-3. The team posted their 20th win of the season against Colorado on 13 February, becoming the first team to tally 20 or more wins in four consecutive seasons. Head coach Frank Martin also became the first head coach to post three 20-win seasons to start a career. It is also the earliest a K-State squad has won 20 games, surpassing the 1958-59 team that won its 20th game on Feb. 16, 1959.

== Rankings ==
Ranking movement Legend: ██ Improvement in ranking. ██ Decrease in ranking. ██ Not ranked the previous week. rv=Others receiving votes.
Poll	Pre	Wk 1	Wk 2	Wk 3	Wk 4	Wk 5	Wk 6	Wk 7	Wk 8	Wk 9	Wk 10	Wk 11	Wk 12	Wk 13	Wk 14	Wk 15	Wk 16	WK 17	Wk 18	Final
AP	rv	rv	rv	rv	rv	17	12	12	11	13	10	11	10	9	7	6	5	9	7	7
Coaches	rv	rv	rv	rv	rv	22	15	12	10	12	9	13	11	9	7	6	5	9	7	7

== Roster ==
#	Name	Height	Weight (lbs.)	Position	Class	Hometown	Previous Team(s)
0	Jacob Pullen	6'0"	200	G	Jr.	Maywood, Illinois	Proviso East HS
2	Jordan Henriquez	7'0"	245	F	Fr.	Port Chester, New York	The Winchendon School Winchendon, Massachusetts
3	Martavious Irving	6'1"	209	G	Fr.	Fort Lauderdale, Florida	Boyd H. Anderson HS
10	Victor Ojeleye	6'6"	225	F	So.	Ottawa, Kansas	The Patterson School
12	Nick Russell	6'4"	200	F	Fr.	Duncanville, Texas	Grace Preparatory Academy Arlington, Texas
13	Justin Werner	6'3"	190	G	So.	Topeka, Kansas	Washburn Rural HS
15	Luis Colon	6'10"	265	C	Sr.	Bayamón, Puerto Rico	Krop HS (Miami)
21	Denis Clemente	6'1"	175	G	Sr.	Bayamón, Puerto Rico	Calusa Prep HS (Miami); Miami
22	Rodney McGruder	6'4"	205	G	Fr.	Washington, D.C.	Arlington Country Day
23	Dominique Sutton	6'5"	210	G	Jr.	Durham, North Carolina	Patterson HS (Lenoir, North Carolina)
24	Curtis Kelly	6'8"	250	F	Jr.	Manhattan, New York	Rice HS; Connecticut
31	Chris Merriewether	6'3"	210	G	Sr.	Jacksonville, Florida	Arlington Country Day HS
32	Jamar Samuels	6'7"	215	F	So.	Washington, D.C.	Patterson HS (Lenoir, North Carolina)
33	Wally Judge	6'9"	248	F	Fr.	Washington, D.C.	Arlington Country Day
