= Bramlage Coliseum =

Multi-purpose arena in Manhattan, Kansas, United States

Fred Bramlage Coliseum
- Octagon of Doom
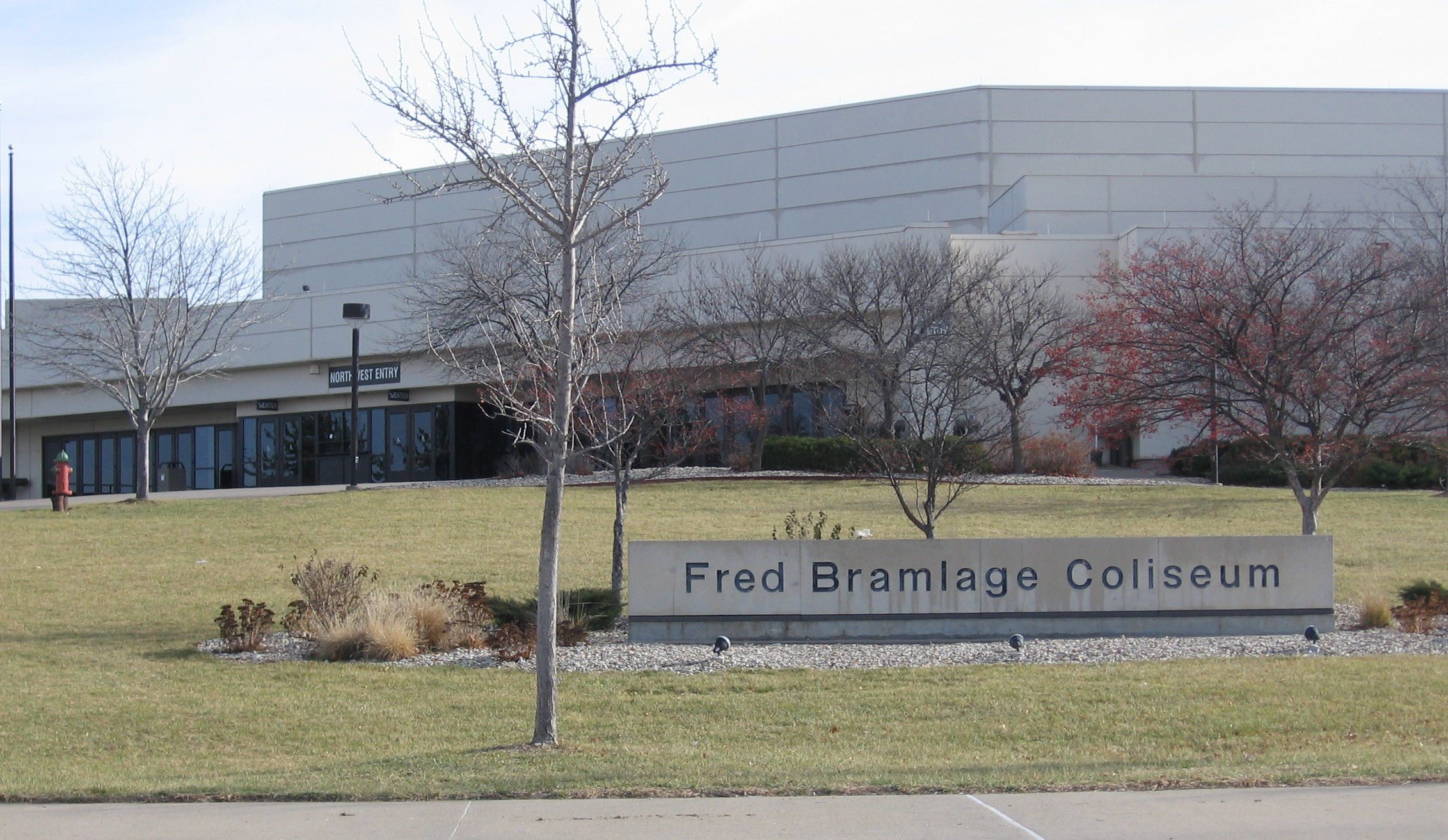
- Interactive map of Fred Bramlage Coliseum
- Location: 1800 College Avenue; Manhattan, KS 66502
- Coordinates: 39°12′01.3″N 96°35′37.8″W
- Operator: Kansas State University
- Capacity: 11,654 (2022–present); 12,528 (2007–2021); 13,340 (2001–2007); 13,500 (1988–2001)
- Surface: Hardwood
- Record attendance: 13,762 (2/22/1992 vs. Kansas)

Construction
- Groundbreaking: October 18, 1986
- Opened: October 21, 1988
- Cost: $17.5 million ($47.6 million in 2025 dollars)
- Architect: Gossen Livingston Architects
- General contractor: JE Dunn Construction

Tenant
- Kansas State Wildcats (NCAA DI) (1988–present)

Fred Bramlage Coliseum is a multi-purpose indoor arena in Manhattan, Kansas, with an official capacity of 11,000. It is the home to the Kansas State University men's and women's basketball teams, and used to serve as the venue for Kansas State's women's volleyball team. The facility currently holds offices for various administrative and business units for K-State Athletics, and the track & field team. Bramlage was previously the home for other K-State team offices, including women's soccer and baseball.

== Construction and usage ==
The arena is located in the northwest corner of the KSU campus, along with the rest of the school's athletic facilities, abutting the south end zone of Bill Snyder Family Football Stadium.

The arena was built to replace Ahearn Field House, K-State's basketball facility from 1950 to 1988. Construction of Bramlage Coliseum began with a groundbreaking on October 18, 1986, and was completed in 1988. The construction was funded entirely by student fees and donations from alumni and friends of the university.

It was named for Junction City businessman Fred Bramlage, who played a major role in raising the funds needed to build the arena.

On November 26, 1988, Kansas State University officially opened Bramlage Coliseum with an 81–77 victory over Purdue University in a rematch from the Sweet 16 of the 1988 NCAA tournament. The first basketball game actually played in the arena, however, was an NBA exhibition game between the Dallas Mavericks, led by former K-State standout Rolando Blackman, and the San Antonio Spurs on October 21, 1988.

Entering the 2018–19 season, the Kansas State Wildcats men's basketball team has posted a 366–116 (.759) record in Bramlage Coliseum. Over the previous 13 seasons, the home record is 165–36 (.821).

The facility hosted women's NCAA basketball tournament games in 2002, 2003, 2017 and 2024. K-State hosted the first rounds of games as the #7 seed over #2 Stanford due to a venue scheduling conflict with the Pac-12 Women's Gymnastics Championships at Stanford.

Bramlage has also been home to the Kansas State High School Activities Association Class 2A boys and girls state championship tournaments since 1990.

The arena hosted its first ESPN College Gameday show on January 30, 2010, ahead of the competition featuring the #11 K-State Wildcats and the #2 Kansas Jayhawks. This set the attendance record for the show at 8,159 fans, breaking the previous record of 6,700 set the week prior.

=== Upgrades and Renovations ===
In 2011, the playing court was refurbished with a new surface and design which was originally purchased and installed in 2004. The changes were spurred by a combination of NCAA rule changes and a branding initiative by the Athletic Department. New features included changes to the 3 point line, the addition of the restricted area arc under the basket, as well as aesthetic changes with contrasting wood color shading in addition to an octagonal baseline to echo the arenas fundamental shape. The project cost $39,000 and was completed by Robbins Sports Surfaces.

In 2012, a dedicated $18 million basketball training facility was completed adjacent to Bramlage Coliseum and was later named the 'Ice Family Basketball Center' in 2015. This facility is the home to the men's and women's basketball teams and features team offices, two practice courts, locker rooms, player lounges, a theatre-style team film room, weight room, and a sports medicine center with a state-of-the-art hydrotherapy facility.

2014 saw $2.4 million in upgrades to the video and audio systems in the arena including a new center-hung video board that was 4-times larger than the one it replaced which was originally installed in 2000.

In September 2019, an updated facilities master plan and fundraising initiative was launched and currently is ongoing. This plan includes the renovation and construction of new and existing facilities encapsulating all university sponsored sports. The plan called for $85 million in changes to Bramlage including additional premium seating within the arena, updates to entrances and the concourse, expanded fan amenities, and a permanent team store. Funding is being primarily driven by philanthropic gifts.

In 2021, the Shamrock Zone was completed on the north end of the coliseum and replaced the existing Legends Club and offices. This $50 million addition is a dual-purpose space which provides premium amenities for basketball and football including additional premium seating for football games.

Plans were announced in May 2022 calling for additional premium seating upgrades for Bramlage. This includes an increase in courtside seats, new Loge boxes, and the new 'Legends Lounge' spanning the top of Sections 17–22.These additions are expected to generate an additional $500,000 in revenue for the department.

=== Historical displays ===
The concourse around the arena is decorated with pictures of Wildcat greats and trophies won by the men's and women's teams over the years. A painted border around the top of the walls inside the Coliseum shows the years the Wildcat basketball programs won conference crowns or participated in the NCAA Tournament or NIT (WNIT). Hanging from the rafters in Bramlage are the retired numbers of former Wildcat greats including: Ernie Barrett, Rolando Blackman, Mitch Richmond, Bob Boozer, Mike Evans, Dick Knostman, Lon Kruger, Jack Parr, Chuckie Williams, Nicole Ohlde, Kendra Wecker and Shalee Lehning.

== Traditions ==
The unofficial nickname for Bramlage Coliseum is the "Octagon of Doom", due to the octagon shape of the arena. The nickname was popularized in the media during the 2009–2010 season, but it was first used in an online internet forums in early 2007. K-State students bring octagonal shaped signs with "Doom" written on them and wear "Doom" T-shirts to games.

Before every game, the crowd sings Wildcat Victory, the Kansas State fight song, and then rocks back and forth to the Wabash Cannonball. This had been touted as one of the best traditions in college sports by ESPN and other Sports Broadcasting outlets. While the opposing team's starting lineup is announced, the student section shakes newspapers, and after each name chants, "So What" "Who Cares" "Who's He?" "Big Deal" "Go Home," and then rips the papers and throws them in the air at the beginning of the introduction of the Kansas State starting lineup. Each time an opposing player commits a foul the student section chants the number of fouls that player has, and every time a K-State player sinks a three-point basket, the announcer says the name of the player followed by "for", and then the crowd echoes "three!" Following a K-State victory, the crowd performs a "K-S-U Wildcats" chant. If an opposing team's player fouls out of the game, the crowd chants "left, right, left" for each step. If he stands, they chant "standing, standing" until the player sits down, at which time the crowd yells "Sit down!"

== Seating capacity ==
Seating capacity in Bramlage was originally 13,500. Adjustments for fire codes lowered this number to 13,340 in the 2000s, and construction prior to the 2007-2008 season eliminated another approximately 800 seats to add luxury boxes and bring handicap seating up to compliance. The current capacity, as of the 2022–23 season, is 11,654. Seating types include chairbacks, cushioned and bench seating, and loge boxes.

=== Largest crowds ===
- 13,762 - Kansas Jayhawks - February 22, 1992
- 13,685 - Kansas Jayhawks - January 27, 1990
- 13,597 - Missouri Tigers - March 1, 1989
- 13,586 - Kansas Jayhawks - January 14, 1989
- 13,584 - Kansas Jayhawks - January 18, 1993
- 13,580 - Oklahoma Sooners - February 19, 1994
- 13,573 - Missouri Tigers - February 8, 1990
- 13,553 - Kansas Jayhawks - February 12, 1994
- 13,536 - Oklahoma State Cowboys - February 25, 1989
- 13,520 - Nebraska Cornhuskers - March 3, 1990

== Non-sporting events ==
In addition to Kansas State basketball, Bramlage Coliseum also hosts concerts, speeches, trade shows, auctions, and commencement ceremonies. The arena has seated up to 14,000 for concerts. It has featured performances by the following groups and individuals:

- Beach Boys - October 1, 1988
- Def Leppard - October 20, 1988
- Mötley Crüe - March 2, 1990
- AC/DC - December 9, 1990
- Poison - February 1, 1991
- Damn Yankees / Bad Company - February 20, 1991
- Van Halen - April 6, 1992
- Weezer - November 7, 1994
- Garth Brooks - April 26, 27 1996
- The Dixie Chicks - November 16, 2000
- The Destiny's Child - March 31, 2001
- Toby Keith - January 24, 2004
- Bob Dylan - October 26, 2004
- Dierks Bentley - 2006
- Will Ferrell - February 29, 2008
- Ben Folds - April 8, 2009
- Jason Derulo - April 11, 2011
- Seth Meyers - September 29, 2012
- Bill Nye - October 11, 2013
- Kevin Hart - October 5, 2015
- Jon Bellion - April 27, 2017
- Kareem Abdul-Jabbar - February 6, 2018
- Nick Jonas - April 12, 2018
- Harlem Globetrotters - February 11, 2019
- T-Pain - May 4, 2019

The arena has also hosted speaking events as part of the Landon Lecture Series by the following personalities:

- President Jimmy Carter
- Ross Perot
- Henry Kissinger
- Janet Reno
- Jesse Jackson
- Paul Harvey
- President George W. Bush
- Donald Rumsfeld
- President Bill Clinton

== See also ==
- List of NCAA Division I basketball arenas
