= Jason Bennett =

Jason Bennett may refer to:

- Jason Bennett (cricketer) (born 1982), West Indian first-class cricketer
- Jason Bennett (basketball) (born 1986), American basketball player
