= Rodney McGruder =

American basketball player (born 1991)

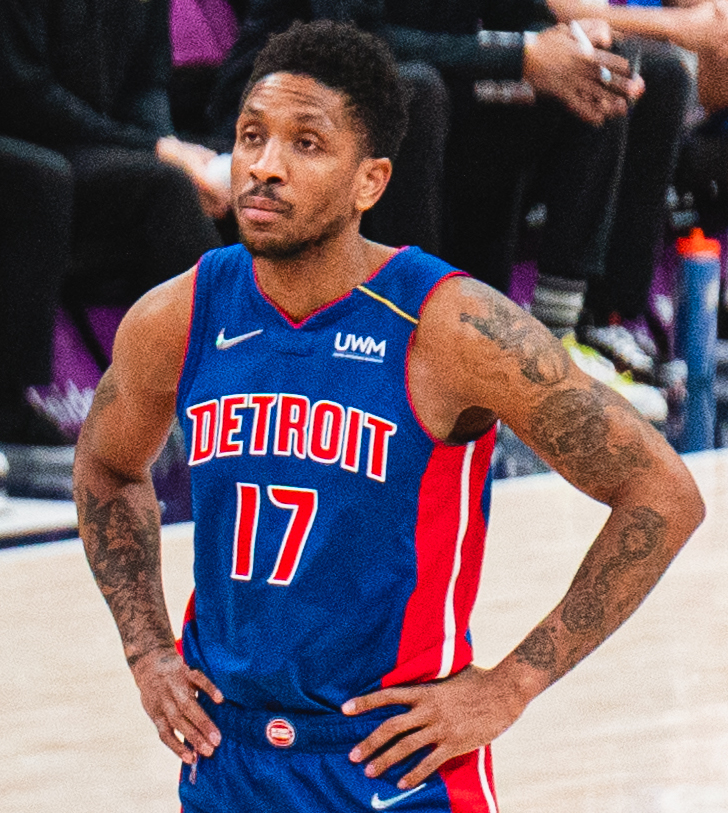
- McGruder with the Detroit Pistons in 2022

No. 17 – Longobardi Scafati Basket
- Position: Shooting guard
- League: LBA

Personal information
- Born: July 29, 1991 (age 35) Landover, Maryland, U.S.
- Listed height: 6 ft 4 in (1.93 m)
- Listed weight: 205 lb (93 kg)

Career information
- High school: Archbishop Carroll (Washington, D.C.); Arlington Country Day (Jacksonville, Florida)
- College: Kansas State (2009–2013)
- NBA draft: 2013: undrafted
- Playing career: 2013–present

Career history
- 2013–2014: Paks Atomerőmű
- 2014–2015: Maine Red Claws
- 2015–2016: Sioux Falls Skyforce
- 2016–2019: Miami Heat
- 2018: →Sioux Falls Skyforce
- 2019–2020: Los Angeles Clippers
- 2020–2023: Detroit Pistons
- 2024: Olimpia Milano
- 2024–2025: Reyer Venezia
- 2026–present: Scafati Basket

Career highlights
- NBA D-League champion (2016); AP honorable mention All-American (2013); First-team All-Big 12 (2013); Second-team All-Big 12 (2012); Third-team All-Big 12 (2011)
- Stats at NBA.com
- Stats at Basketball Reference

Rodney Christian McGruder (born July 29, 1991) is an American professional basketball player for Scafati Basket of the Lega Basket Serie A (LBA). He played college basketball for the Kansas State Wildcats.

== College career ==
McGruder, a 6'4" shooting guard from Landover, Maryland, was an AAU teammate of Michael Beasley's and followed Beasley's path to Kansas State to play for coach Frank Martin. McGruder started for three seasons for the Wildcats. As a sophomore in 2010–11, McGruder teamed with backcourt mate Jacob Pullen to lead the Wildcats to a third place Big 12 Conference finish. McGruder averaged 11.1 points and a team-best 5.9 rebounds per game.

In his junior season, McGruder upped his scoring to 15.8 per game and made the second team All-Big 12.

As a senior in 2012–13, McGruder was a preseason All-Big 12 pick. He was also named a top 30 finalist for the Naismith College Player of the Year on February 27, 2013. During his senior season, McGruder led the Wildcats to a first-place finish in the Big XII.

== Professional career ==
=== Atomerőmű (2013–2014) ===
After going undrafted in the 2013 NBA draft, McGruder joined the Orlando Magic for the Orlando Summer League and the Charlotte Bobcats for the Las Vegas Summer League. On September 27, 2013, he signed with the Oklahoma City Thunder. However, he was later waived by the Thunder on October 25, 2013.

In November 2013, McGruder signed with Atomerőmű SE of Hungary for the 2013–14 season. In 29 league games for Atomerőmű, he averaged 14.4 points, 5.3 rebounds and 2.3 assists per game.

=== Maine Red Claws (2014–2015) ===
In July 2014, McGruder joined the Golden State Warriors for the 2014 NBA Summer League. On September 29, 2014, he signed with the Boston Celtics. However, he was later waived by the Celtics on October 27, 2014. Four days later, he was acquired by the Maine Red Claws as an affiliate player. On March 26, 2015, he was waived by the Red Claws after appearing in 26 games.

=== Sioux Falls Skyforce (2015–2016) ===
On March 29, 2015, McGruder was acquired by the Sioux Falls Skyforce.

In July 2015, McGruder joined the Miami Heat for the 2015 NBA Summer League. On November 2, 2015, he was reacquired by the Skyforce. He helped the Skyforce finish with a D-League-best 40–10 record in 2015–16, and went on to help the team win the league championship with a 2–1 Finals series win over the Los Angeles D-Fenders.

=== Miami Heat (2016–2019) ===
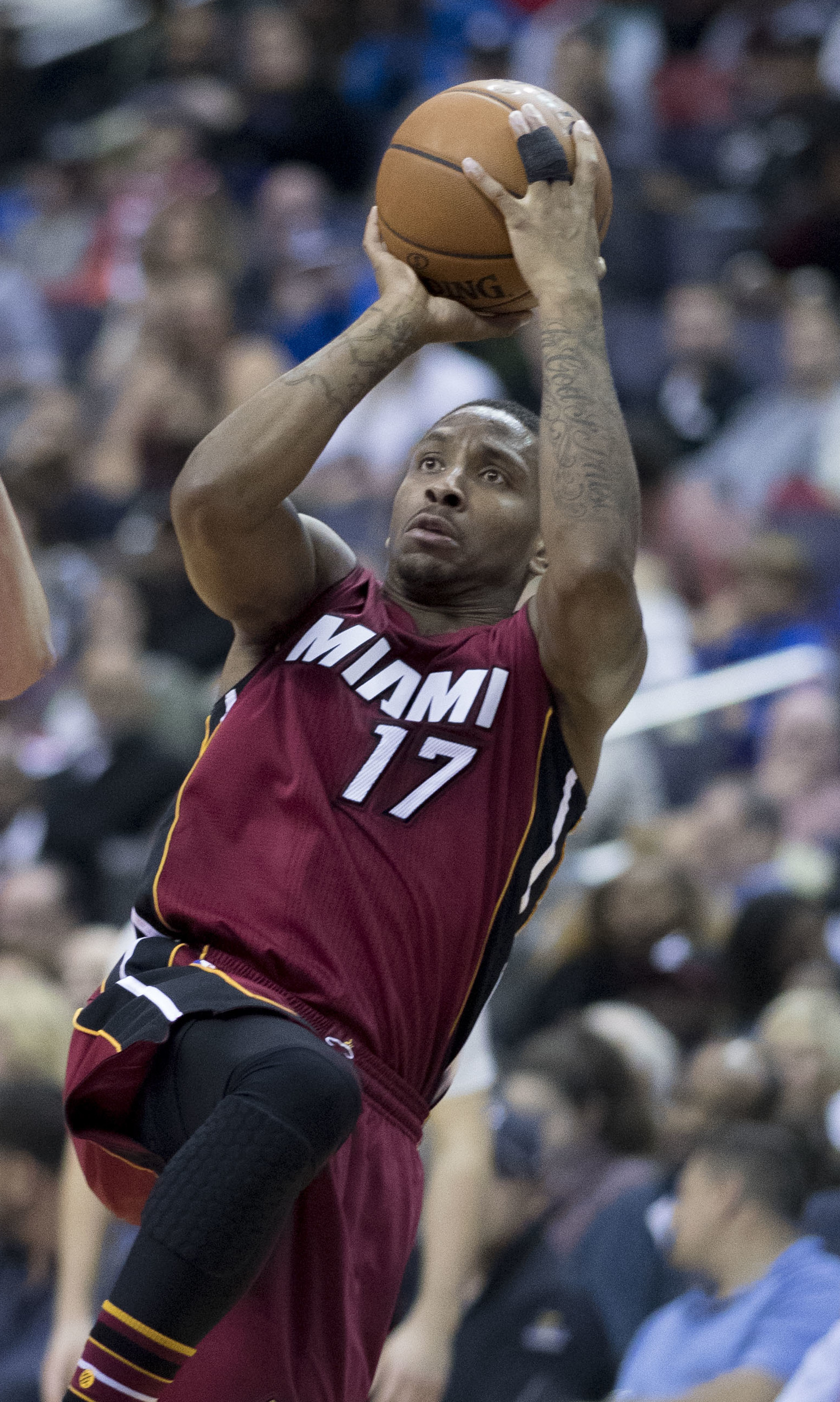
McGruder shoots while with the Miami Heat in 2016

In July 2016, McGruder re-joined the Miami Heat for the 2016 NBA Summer League. On July 7, he signed a three-year, partially guaranteed contract with the Heat. He made his NBA debut in the Heat's season opener on October 26, 2016, against the Orlando Magic. In just under 24 minutes off the bench, he recorded six points, three rebounds and two steals in a 108–96 win. On February 6, 2017, he scored a season-high 15 points against the Minnesota Timberwolves.

On October 12, 2017, McGruder was ruled out indefinitely with a stress fracture in his left leg. He made his season debut for the Heat on February 27, 2018, against the Philadelphia 76ers after playing two games for the Sioux Falls Skyforce just days prior.

On April 7, 2019, McGruder was waived by the Heat.

=== Los Angeles Clippers (2019–2020) ===
On April 9, 2019, McGruder was claimed off waivers by the Los Angeles Clippers.

=== Detroit Pistons (2020–2023) ===
On November 19, 2020, McGruder was traded to the Detroit Pistons in a three-team trade that sent Justin Patton and Luke Kennard to the Clippers.

On August 6, 2021, McGruder was waived by the Pistons. On August 11, however, he re-signed with the Pistons.

On January 10, 2022, McGruder was traded along with a 2022 second-round draft pick via the Brooklyn Nets to the Denver Nuggets in exchange for Bol Bol. However, the trade was voided on January 13, 2022, after Bol failed his physical, leading to McGruder returning to the Pistons.

On August 1, 2022, McGruder re-signed with the Pistons.

On September 28, 2023, McGruder signed with the Golden State Warriors, but was waived on October 20.

=== Olimpia Milano (2024) ===
On January 10, 2024, McGruder signed with EA7 Emporio Armani Milan of the Lega Basket Serie A and the EuroLeague. On March 13, 2024, he parted ways with the Italian powerhouse due to a personal matter overseas. In 7 EuroLeague games, he averaged 7.6 points and 2.6 rebounds in 18 minutes per contest.

=== Reyer Venezia (2024–2025) ===
On October 4, 2024, McGruder signed with Reyer Venezia of the Italian Lega Basket Serie A (LBA).

=== Scafati Basket (2026–present) ===
On September 15, 2026, McGruder signed with Scafati Basket of the Lega Basket Serie A (LBA).

== Career statistics ==
Legend
GP	Games played	GS	Games started	MPG	Minutes per game
FG%	Field-goal percentage	3P%	3-point field-goal percentage	FT%	Free-throw percentage
RPG	Rebounds per game	APG	Assists per game	SPG	Steals per game
BPG	Blocks per game	PPG	Points per game	PIR	Performance index rating
**Bold**	Career high

=== NBA ===
==== Regular season ====
Year	Team	GP	GS	MPG	FG%	3P%	FT%	RPG	APG	SPG	BPG	PPG
2016–17	Miami	**78**	**65**	**25.2**	.413	.332	.620	3.3	1.6	**.6**	**.2**	6.4
2017–18	Miami	18	2	16.6	.493	.429	.500	1.8	.9	.4	**.2**	5.1
2018–19	Miami	66	45	23.5	.403	.351	.722	**3.6**	**1.7**	.5	**.2**	**7.6**
2019–20	L.A. Clippers	56	4	15.6	.398	.270	.559	2.7	.6	.5	.1	3.3
2020–21	Detroit	16	2	12.1	**.529**	**.458**	.750	1.4	1.0	.5	.1	5.7
2021–22	Detroit	51	2	14.8	.436	.397	.731	2.2	.9	.4	.1	5.4
2022–23	Detroit	33	12	15.9	.408	.423	**.818**	2.2	.8	.5	.0	5.5
Career		318	132	19.4	.420	.360	.672	2.8	1.2	.5	.2	5.7

==== Playoffs ====
Year	Team	GP	GS	MPG	FG%	3P%	FT%	RPG	APG	SPG	BPG	PPG
2018	Miami	4	0	**4.0**	.250	.000	—	**1.0**	—	—	—	0.5
2020	L.A. Clippers	**5**	0	3.2	**.600**	**.667**	—	.8	**.4**	—	—	**1.6**
Career		9	0	3.6	.444	.400	—	.9	.2	—	—	1.1

=== EuroLeague ===
Year	Team	GP	GS	MPG	FG%	3P%	FT%	RPG	APG	SPG	BPG	PPG	PIR
2023–24	Olimpia Milano	7	2	18.1	.444	.300	.636	2.6	.9	.6	—	7.6	6.3
Career		7	2	18.1	.444	.300	.636	2.6	.9	.6	—	7.6	6.3

=== FIBA EuroChallenge ===
Year	Team	GP	GS	MPG	FG%	3P%	FT%	RPG	APG	SPG	BPG	PPG
2013–14	Atomerőmű SE	6	6	28.5	.387	.286	.600	4.5	2.0	1.2	—	12.7
Career		6	6	28.5	.387	.286	.600	4.5	2.0	1.2	—	12.7

=== Domestic leagues ===
Year	Team	League	GP	MPG	FG%	3P%	FT%	RPG	APG	SPG	BPG	PPG
2013–14	(Hungary) Atomerőmű SE	NB I/A	29	27.8	.496	.216	.724	5.3	2.3	1.6	.3	14.4
2014–15	(United States) Maine Red Claws	D-League	26	22.9	.466	.333	.581	4.0	1.3	.5	.1	9.6
2014–15	(United States) Sioux Falls Skyforce	D-League	3	24.8	.529	.429	1.000	3.7	2.0	.3	—	7.3
2015–16	(United States) Sioux Falls Skyforce	D-League	48	37.5	.513	.384	.739	5.3	2.3	1.4	.3	15.8
2017–18	(United States) Sioux Falls Skyforce	G League	2	22.5	.433	.091	.000	5.0	1.0	.5	—	13.5
2023–24	(Italy) Olimpia Milano	LBA	7	18.1	.444	.300	.636	2.6	.9	.6	—	7.6

=== College ===
Year	Team	GP	GS	MPG	FG%	3P%	FT%	RPG	APG	SPG	BPG	PPG
2009–10	Kansas State	33	0	12.3	**.495**	**.419**	.720	2.8	.5	.3	**.3**	3.9
2010–11	Kansas State	34	33	30.6	.439	.408	.710	**5.9**	1.5	.7	.2	11.1
2011–12	Kansas State	33	33	32.9	.463	.385	**.802**	5.2	1.4	1.2	**.3**	**15.8**
2012–13	Kansas State	**35**	**34**	**33.5**	.442	.336	.752	5.4	**2.0**	**1.3**	**.3**	15.6
Career		135	100	27.4	.452	.381	.759	4.8	1.4	.9	.3	11.7
