= Ernie Barrett =

American basketball player (1929–2023)

Personal information
- Born: August 27, 1929 Pratt, Kansas, U.S.
- Died: April 21, 2023 (aged 93) Manhattan, Kansas, U.S.
- Listed height: 6 ft 3 in (1.91 m)
- Listed weight: 180 lb (82 kg)

Career information
- High school: Wellington (Wellington, Kansas)
- College: Kansas State (1948–1951)
- NBA draft: 1951: 1st round, 7th overall pick
- Drafted by: Boston Celtics
- Playing career: 1951–1956
- Position: Forward / guard
- Number: 23

Career history
- 1953–1954, 1955–1956: Boston Celtics

Career highlights
- Consensus second-team All-American (1951); First-team All-Big Seven (1951); No. 22 jersey retired by Kansas State Wildcats

Career NBA statistics
- Points: 641 (4.9 ppg)
- Rebounds: 343 (2.6 rpg)
- Assists: 229 (1.7 apg)
- Stats at NBA.com
- Stats at Basketball Reference

Ernie Drew "Black Jack" Barrett (August 27, 1929 – April 21, 2023) was an American professional basketball player for the Boston Celtics of the National Basketball Association (NBA). He played college basketball for the Kansas State Wildcats. He was selected by the Celtics in the first round of the 1951 NBA draft with the seventh overall pick.

== College and professional career ==
Barrett was recruited by coaches including, Phog Allen and Henry Iba, but he chose to attend Kansas State University to play for Jack Gardner and Tex Winter in 1947.

Barrett led the Wildcats to the national championship game in 1951. He suffered a shoulder injury in the semi-finals against Oklahoma A&M, and his injury heavily impacted the Wildcats, who lost in the title game.

Barrett was selected by the Boston Celtics in the 1st round (7th pick overall) of the 1951 NBA draft and played for the Celtics (1953–54, 1955–56) in the NBA for 131 games.

== Personal life and death ==
A local restaurant, is named Mr. K's in Barrett's honor. He helped raise money for many athletic facilities that are still in use. He has a statue, which depicts him extending his right arm for a handshake.

Barrett died in Manhattan, Kansas, on April 21, 2023, at the age of 93.

== Career statistics ==
Legend
GP	Games played	GS	Games started	MPG	Minutes per game
FG%	Field goal percentage	3P%	3-point field goal percentage	FT%	Free throw percentage
RPG	Rebounds per game	APG	Assists per game	SPG	Steals per game
BPG	Blocks per game	PPG	Points per game	**Bold**	Career high

=== NBA ===
==== Regular season ====
Year	Team	GP	MPG	FG%	FT%	RPG	APG	PPG
1953–54	Boston	59	10.9	.314	.560	1.7	.9	2.3
1955–56	Boston	**72**	**20.2**	**.388**	**.788**	**3.4**	**2.4**	**7.0**
Career		131	16.0	.369	.748	2.6	1.7	4.9

==== Playoffs ====
Year	Team	GP	MPG	FG%	FT%	RPG	APG	PPG
1954	Boston	**6**	10.5	.150	**1.000**	1.0	.7	1.3
1956	Boston	3	**14.3**	**.308**	**1.000**	**2.3**	**1.3**	**3.7**
Career		9	11.8	.212	1.000	1.4	.9	2.1
