= Chuckie Williams =

American basketball player

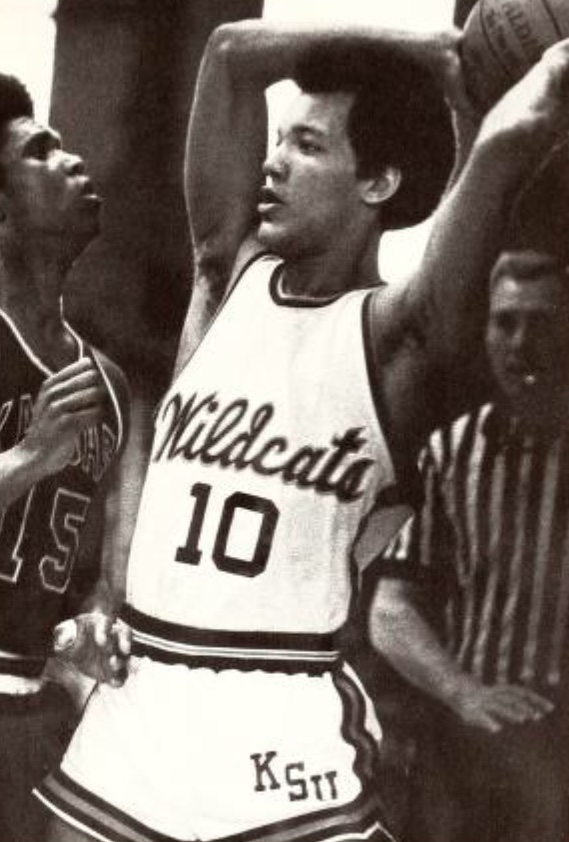
- Williams from the 1976 Royal Purple

Personal information
- Born: December 31, 1953 (age 72) Columbus, Ohio, U.S.
- Listed height: 6 ft 3 in (1.91 m)
- Listed weight: 180 lb (82 kg)

Career information
- High school: East (Columbus, Ohio)
- College: Kansas State (1972–1976)
- NBA draft: 1976: 1st round, 15th overall pick
- Drafted by: Cleveland Cavaliers
- Playing career: 1976–1978
- Position: Shooting guard
- Number: 15

Career history
- 1976–1977: Cleveland Cavaliers
- 1978: Richmond Virginians

Career highlights
- 2× First-team All-Big Eight (1975, 1976); No. 10 Jersey retired by Kansas State Wildcats; First-team Parade All-American (1972)
- Stats at NBA.com
- Stats at Basketball Reference

Chuckie Williams (born December 31, 1953) is an American former professional basketball player.

== Biography ==
A 6 ft 3 in (1.91 m) guard, Williams played at Kansas State University from 1972 to 1976 for head coach Jack Hartman. One of the school's most potent long-range shooters, Williams was a four-year letterman from 1972 to 1976. He helped lead the Wildcats to an 82–30 (.732) record, including two NCAA Elite Eight appearances and the 1973 Big Eight regular-season championship. Ironically, he spanned the years between his fellow retirees and was a teammate of both Mike Evans and Lon Kruger.

After averaging just 5.3 points as a sophomore, Williams made one of the biggest scoring jumps in school history the following season as he paced the Wildcats in scoring at 22.1 points per game en route to guiding K-State to the 1975 Elite Eight. He was named first team All-Big Eight and a Helms Foundation All-American. The following year, Williams guided the squad to its second consecutive 20-win season en route to earning second team All-America honors from The Sporting News, Converse Yearbook and Basketball Weekly. He also repeated his first-team All-Big Eight honors as well as Helms Foundation All-America accolade.

A native of Columbus, Ohio, Williams still ranks among the top 10 in 24 single-game, season or career statistical categories in school history, including tops in field goals made in a game (22), field goals attempted in a game (42), season field goals made (290) and season field goal attempts (594). He is also the school's sixth all-time leading scorer with 1,364 points.

Williams held the school single-game scoring mark for 19 years with 47 points against Holy Cross in 1975 before Askia Jones broke the mark with 62 against Fresno State on March 24, 1994. He also shares the mark for most points in an NCAA Tournament game with 35 against Syracuse in 1975. For his career, Williams averaged 16.2 points on 47.0 percent shooting with 2.7 rebounds in 84 games.

Williams became just the second player in school history to be selected in the first round of the 1976 NBA draft when he was picked 15th by the Cleveland Cavaliers. He played 22 games for Cleveland in 1976–77, averaging 1.7 points per game. An injury to Williams' back in his first professional year ended his career.

== Career statistics ==
Legend
GP	Games played	GS	Games started	MPG	Minutes per game
FG%	Field goal percentage	3P%	3-point field goal percentage	FT%	Free throw percentage
RPG	Rebounds per game	APG	Assists per game	SPG	Steals per game
BPG	Blocks per game	PPG	Points per game	**Bold**	Career high

=== NBA ===
==== Regular season ====
Year	Team	GP	GS	MPG	FG%	FT%	RPG	APG	SPG	BPG	PPG
1976–77	Cleveland	22	0	3.0	.298	.750	.2	.3	.0	.0	1.7
