= Gene Williams (basketball) =

American basketball player (born 1947)

Personal information
- Born: April 1, 1947 (age 79) San Francisco, California, U.S.
- Listed height: 6 ft 7 in (2.01 m)
- Listed weight: 235 lb (107 kg)

Career information
- High school: Galileo (San Francisco, California)
- College: CC of San Francisco (1965–1967); Kansas State (1967–1969)
- NBA draft: 1969: 2nd round, 24th overall pick
- Drafted by: Phoenix Suns
- Position: Forward
- Number: 25

Career history
- 1969: Kentucky Colonels

Career highlights
- Second team All-Big Eight (1969)
- Stats at Basketball Reference

Eugene James Williams (born April 1, 1947) is an American former professional basketball player.

He played college basketball for Kansas State from 1967 to 1969 and was All-Big Eight Conference second team selection in his senior year.

Williams had been selected by the Kentucky Colonels in the third round of the 1969 ABA Draft and by the Phoenix Suns in the second round of the 1969 NBA draft. He signed with the Suns during the summer. In October, the Suns assigned him to the Eastern League. On November 12, he signed with the Colonels after they bought out his contract with the Suns. Less than 10-days later, he was waived by the Colonels after appearing in one game.
