= D. J. Johnson (basketball) =

American basketball player (born 1993)

Personal information
- Born: October 8, 1993 (age 33) St. Louis, Missouri, U.S.
- Listed height: 6 ft 9 in (2.06 m)
- Listed weight: 225 lb (102 kg)

Career information
- High school: Parkway North (St. Louis County, Missouri)
- College: Kansas State (2012–2017)
- NBA draft: 2017: undrafted
- Playing career: 2017–2022
- Position: Power forward / center

Career history
- 2017–2018: Lavrio
- 2018–2019: Mobis Phoebus
- 2019: Dorados de Chihuahua
- 2019: Bambitious Nara
- 2019–2020: Santa Cruz Warriors
- 2020: Jeonju KCC Egis
- 2021–2022: Grand Rapids Gold
- 2022: Fort Wayne Mad Ants

Darrell Jerome Johnson Jr. (born October 8, 1993) is an American former professional basketball player. Standing at 2.06 m (6 ft 9 in), he played the power forward and the center positions. After playing five years of college basketball at Kansas State, Johnson entered the 2017 NBA draft, but was not selected.

== Early life ==
Johnson played high school basketball at Parkway North High School in St. Louis County, Missouri. He finished with a No. 10 final ranking in the St. Louis Post-Dispatch large school classification. Johnson averaged 16.3 points, 11.9 rebounds, 5.0 blocks, 1.6 steals and 1.2 assists per game in 28 games as a senior in 2011–12 and led the Vikings in scoring, rebounding, field goal percentage and blocks, while he ranked among the area leaders in both blocks (second) and rebounding (fourth).

== College career ==
As a freshman at Kansas State, Johnson played 30 games, producing 2.3 points and 2.5 rebounds per game with a total of 11 blocks. As a sophomore Johnson played in 33 contests, and improved his numbers, averaging 3.4 points, 3.5 rebounds and 0.5 blocks per game, improving his playing time to 13.9 minutes per game. The next season, he did't appear to a single game due to an injury. During his senior year, Johnson was the starter center of his team, having 11.3 points 5.7 rebounds and 1.5 blocks per game. He became just the fourth Wildcat to connect on 60 percent or better from the field in a single season, joining Tony Kitt, Marcus McCollough and Steve Soldner.

== Professional career ==
After going undrafted in the 2017 NBA draft, Johnson joined Lavrio of the Greek Basket League.

=== Santa Cruz Warriors (2019–2020) ===
He joined the Santa Cruz Warriors of the NBA G League in 2019.

=== Grand Rapids Gold (2021–2022) ===
In October 2021, Johnson joined the Grand Rapids Gold after a successful tryout.

=== Fort Wayne Mad Ants (2022) ===
On January 17, 2022, Johnson was traded from the Grand Rapids Gold to the Fort Wayne Mad Ants. He was waived on January 31.

== The Basketball Tournament ==
D.J. Johnson played for Team Purple & Black in the 2018 edition of The Basketball Tournament. He had nine points, three rebounds and two assists in the team's first-round loss to Atlanta Dirty South.
