= The Patterson School =

Coordinates: 36.0127°N 81.5187°W

Location
- 4646 Patterson School Drive; Lenoir, North Carolina 28645; United States

Information
- School type: Boarding and Day
- Motto: Dedicati nobis totis
- Established: 1909
- Founder: Samuel Legerwood Patterson
- Closed: 2009
- Grades: 7–12 & Postgraduate
- Campus size: 1,400 acres (5.7 km^{2})
- Colours: Blue and Gold
- Nickname: Bulldogs
- Website: https://pattersonschoolfoundation.org/

The Patterson School was a private, non-profit, co-educational, non-denominational, multi-cultural boarding and day school for grades seven through twelve, and one year of post-secondary study, located in Lenoir, North Carolina. The school opened in 1909 under the auspices of Samuel L. Patterson, the school's namesake and the first elected agricultural commissioner for the state of North Carolina.

== Basketball program ==
Patterson was most noted for its successful basketball teams during the 2000s, producing many players who would go on to play professionally. Citing financial concerns, the school closed its doors in 2009, and the facility was leased to the Caldwell County Schools system in 2012.

== Notable former athletes ==
- Tony Crocker, international basketball player and TBL All-Star
- Courtney Fortson, professional basketball player and CBA Most Valuable Player in 2018
- Jeremy Hazell, international basketball player and French League All-Star
- Jordan Hill, former 1st round NBA draft pick in 2009, selected by the New York Knicks
- Ahmad Ibrahim, played in the Lebanese Basketball League
- Davon Jefferson, played in the LBA, plays in the Israeli Basketball Premier League
- Welsey Johnson, basketball player
- DeAndre Kane, played in the Israeli Premier League and EuroLeague
- Arsalan Kazemi, played in the IBSL
- Angel McCoughtry, WNBA player for the Atlanta Dream
- Jamar Samuels, basketball player for Bnei Herzliya of the Israeli Basketball Premier League
- Dominique Sutton, professional basketball player
- Hassan Whiteside, NBA player for the Portland Trail Blazers
