= Nick Russell (basketball) =

American basketball player (born 1991)

Personal information
- Born: March 8, 1991 (age 35) Duncanville, Texas
- Listed height: 6 ft 4 in (1.93 m)
- Listed weight: 209 lb (95 kg)

Career information
- High school: Grace Preparatory Academy (Arlington, Texas)
- College: Kansas State (2009–2011); SMU (2012–2014)
- NBA draft: 2014: undrafted
- Playing career: 2014–2020
- Position: Shooting guard

Career history

Playing
- 2014–2015: ETHA Engomis
- 2015–2016: Walter Tigers Tübingen
- 2016–2017: Apollon Patras
- 2017–2018: Piteşti
- 2019–2020: KFUM Nässjö

Coaching
- 2021–present: Indiana (graduate manager)

Career highlights
- Cypriot Cup champion (2015)

Nick Russell (born March 8, 1991) is an American former professional basketball player. He played college basketball for Kansas State and for SMU from 2009 until 2014.

== High school career ==
Russell attended Grace Preparatory Academy being regarded as one of the top point guards in the country, including the No. 89 overall prospect by ESPN Scouts, and No. 116 in the Rivals150 by Rivals.com. In his senior season, Russell led the Lions to a 31-5 overall record, including an 8-0 record in district play, averaging 17.8 points, 7.0 rebounds and 4.0 assists per game. He was ranked among the top-40 at his position by a number of outlets, including No. 21 by Rivals.com and No. 38 by ESPN Scouts, Inc.. He was also rated as the No. 4 player in the state of Texas for the Class of 2009 by Texashoops.com.

== College career ==
After graduating Grace Preparatory, Russell attended Kansas State where he appeared in 46 games and averaged 3 points, 1.5 rebounds and 0.8 assists in 9.8 minutes per game, during his two years with the Wildcats. In 2011, Russell transferred to SMU, where he played from 2012 until 2014 under coach Larry Brown. In 69 games, Russell managed to improve his numbers averaging 11.8 points, 3.5 rebounds and 3.7 assists in 34.2 minutes per game.

== Professional career ==
After going undrafted in the 2014 NBA draft, Russell joined ETHA Engomis of the Cypriot Basketball League. With ETHA, he won the Cypriot Cup in 2015. With the Cypriot club, he averaged 12.3 points, 4.4 rebounds, 2.5 rebounds and 1.7 steals per game.

On July 7, 2015, he signed with Walter Tigers Tübingen of the Basketball Bundesliga. On August 23, 2016, Russell left the Tigers and signed with the Greek club Apollon Patras.

== Personal life ==
In 2021, Russell joined Indiana as a graduate manager

== Personal life ==
The son of the son of Raymond and Cindy Russell. He earned his bachelor's degree in psychology at SMU in August, 2013.
