= Jason Bennett (basketball) =

American basketball player (born 1986)

Personal information
- Born: December 2, 1986 (age 39) Jacksonville, Florida, U.S.
- Listed height: 7 ft 4 in (2.24 m)
- Listed weight: 310 lb (141 kg)

Career information
- High school: Arlington Country Day School (Jacksonville, Florida)
- College: Kansas State (2006–2007); Tallahassee CC (2007–2008); Detroit Mercy (2008–2009)
- NBA draft: 2009: undrafted
- Playing career: 2009–2011
- Position: Center
- Number: 55

Career history
- 2009–2010: Neptune
- 2010–2011: Jacksonville Giants

Jason Bennett (born December 2, 1986) is an American basketball player who last played for the Jacksonville Giants of the ABA.

== College years ==
A center, Bennett played in college with the Kansas State Wildcats under Bob Huggins. He holds the record for the most blocks in a game in Kansas State history. After one season, he then transferred to Tallahassee Community College and then to the University of Detroit Mercy.

== Professional career ==
In the 2009 to 2010 season he played basketball overseas for the Neptune Basketball Club in Cork, Ireland.

Jason signed with the Jacksonville Giants in 2010.
