= Curtis Kelly =

American basketball player

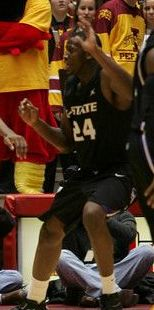
- Kelly playing for Kansas State in 2010

Personal information
- Born: April 11, 1988 (age 38) Bronx, New York, U.S.
- Listed height: 6 ft 10 in (2.08 m)
- Listed weight: 255 lb (116 kg)

Career information
- High school: Rice (New York City, New York)
- College: UConn (2006–2008); Kansas State (2009–2011)
- NBA draft: 2011: undrafted
- Playing career: 2011–2019
- Position: Power forward / center

Career history
- 2011–2013: Hapoel Tel Aviv
- 2013–2014: Vanoli Cremona
- 2014–2015: Maccabi Ashdod
- 2015: Hapoel Tel Aviv
- 2015–2016: Mondi Melikşah Üniversitesi
- 2016–2017: Homenetmen B.C.
- 2017: Maccabi Kiryat Gat
- 2018: Aix Maurienne Savoie Basket
- 2018: Magnolia Hotshots
- 2018–2019: Akhisar Belediyespor

Curtis Ezell Kelly (born April 11, 1988) is an American former professional basketball player.
