= Jordan Henriquez =

American basketball player (born 1989)

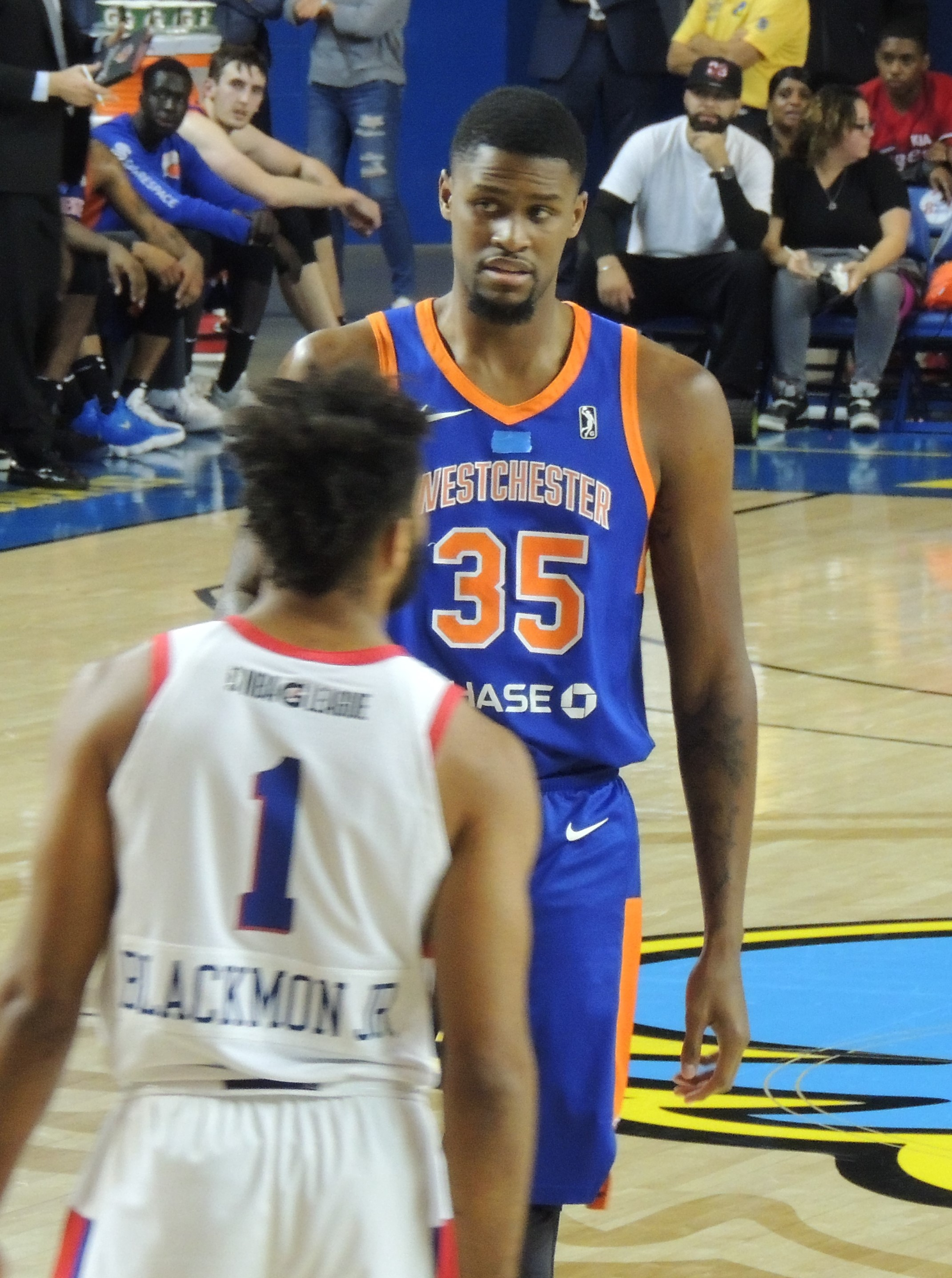
- Henriquez in 2017 with the Westchester Knicks

Personal information
- Born: August 29, 1989 (age 37) Baldwin, New York, U.S.
- Listed height: 6 ft 11 in (2.11 m)
- Listed weight: 250 lb (113 kg)

Career information
- High school: Rice (Harlem, New York)
- College: Kansas State (2009–2013)
- NBA draft: 2013: undrafted
- Playing career: 2013–2018
- Position: Center / power forward
- Number: 35

Career history
- 2013–2014: Rio Grande Valley Vipers
- 2014: Kataja
- 2014–2015: Science City Jena
- 2015–2016: Yokohama B-Corsairs
- 2016–2017: Estudiantes Concordia
- 2017: Correcaminos de Colón
- 2017: Atlético Aguada
- 2017: Saigon Heat
- 2017–2018: Westchester Knicks
- 2018: Rayos de Hermosillo

Career highlights
- NBA D-League All-Rookie Third Team (2014); Big 12 All-Defensive Team (2012)
- Stats at Basketball Reference

Jordan Henriquez-Roberts (born August 29, 1989) is an American professional basketball player. He played college basketball for Kansas State University.

== Professional career ==
After going undrafted in the 2013 NBA draft, Henriquez joined the Houston Rockets for the 2013 NBA Summer League. On August 5, 2013, he signed with the Rockets. However, he was later waived by the Rockets on October 4, 2013. In November 2013, he was acquired by the Rio Grande Valley Vipers as an affiliate player.

In July 2014, Henriquez joined the New York Knicks for the 2014 NBA Summer League. On August 22, 2014, he signed with Kataja Basket Club of the Korisliiga. Afterwards, he signed with Science City Jena, where he averaged 11.3 points and 7.7 rebounds in seven games.

The next season, Henriquez signed with the Yokohama B-Corsairs of the Japanese Bj league, where he played 52 games and averaged 14.6 points, 11.7 rebounds, 1.7 assists and 2.1 blocks. In September 2016, he signed with Estudiantes Concordia of the Argentinian LNB, where he played 6 games and averaged 5.7 points and 5.8 rebounds.

In January, 2017, Henriquez signed with Panamanian team Correcaminos de Colón to dispute the FIBA Americas League, playing three games and averaging 6.7 points and 9.3 rebounds. Later he signed with Atlético Aguada of the Uruguayan LUB, where he averaged 10.0 points, 5.0 rebounds and 1.5 blocks in two games.

In February 2017, Henriquez signed with Vietnamese club Saigon Heat of the ASEAN Basketball League.

On November 3, 2017, Henriquez was included in the final roster of Westchester Knicks of the NBA G League.

On April 27, 2018, Henriquez signed with Rayos de Hermosillo of the Mexican CIBACOPA.

== The Basketball Tournament ==
Jordan Henriquez played for Team Purple & Black in the 2018 edition of The Basketball Tournament. He scored seven points and grabbed 10 rebounds in the team's first-round loss to Atlanta Dirty South.
