= Jamar Samuels =

American basketball player (born 1989)

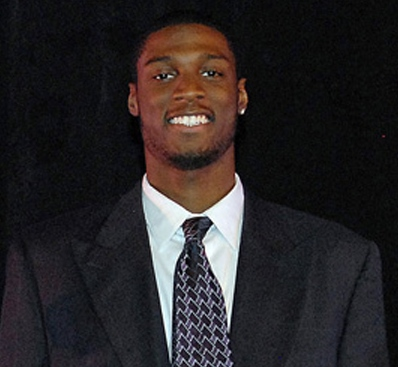
- Samuels in 2011.

Personal information
- Born: May 25, 1989 (age 36) Washington D.C., U.S.
- Listed height: 6 ft 7 in (2.01 m)
- Listed weight: 230 lb (104 kg)

Career information
- High school: The Patterson School (Lenoir, North Carolina)
- College: Kansas State (2008–2012)
- NBA draft: 2012: undrafted
- Playing career: 2012–2019
- Position: Small forward / power forward

Career history
- 2012–2013: Lobe Huesca
- 2013–2014: Veroli Basket
- 2014: Bàsquet Manresa
- 2014–2015: Novipiù Casale Monferrato
- 2015–2016: Bnei Herzliya
- 2017–2018: SCM CSU Craiova
- 2018–2019: Maccabi Kiryat Motzkin

Career highlights
- Big 12 Sixth Man of the Year (2010)

Jamar Lascells Samuels (born May 25, 1989) is an American former professional basketball player who last played for Maccabi Kiryat Motzkin of the Israeli National League in 2019. He played college basketball for Kansas State University.

== Amateur career ==
Samuels attended The Patterson School in Lenoir, North Carolina, and enrolled at Kansas State University to play college basketball for the Kansas State Wildcats. As a senior, he was ruled ineligible by the NCAA for accepting a $200 wire transfer.

== Professional career ==
After going undrafted in the 2012 NBA draft, Samuels moved to Spain and signed with Lobe Huesca for the 2012–13 season. In 29 games for Huesca, he averaged 14.3 points, 7.6 rebounds, 1.7 steals and 1.1 blocks per game.

On August 10, 2013, Samuels signed with Veroli Basket of Italy for the 2013–14 season. In 35 games played for Veroli, he averaged 12.2 points, 5.5 rebounds, 1.1 assists and 1.1 steals per game.

On September 10, 2014, Samuels signed with Bàsquet Manresa of Spain for the 2014–15 season. On November 25, 2014, he parted ways with Manresa after appearing in just eight games. On December 4, 2014, he signed with Novipiù Casale Monferrato of Italy for the rest of the season. In 25 games for Casale, he averaged 7.6 points, 5.8 rebounds and 1.0 assists per game.

On July 30, 2015, Samuels signed with Bnei Herzliya of Israel for the 2015–16 season.

On July 28, 2017, Samuels signed with Romanian club SCM CSU Craiova for the 2017–18 season.

On July 23, 2018, Samuels returned to Israel for a second stint, signing a one-year deal with Maccabi Kiryat Motzkin of the Israeli National League. In 28 games played for Kiryat Motzkin, he averaged 12.1 points and 6.6 rebounds per game.
