= Dick Knostman =

American basketball player

Personal information
- Born: August 9, 1931 Wamego, Kansas, U.S.
- Died: March 16, 2022 (aged 90)
- Listed height: 6 ft 6 in (1.98 m)
- Listed weight: 215 lb (98 kg)

Career information
- High school: Wamego (Wamego, Kansas)
- College: Kansas State (1950–1953)
- NBA draft: 1953: – round, –
- Drafted by: Syracuse Nationals
- Playing career: 1953–1954
- Position: Center
- Number: 10

Career history
- 1953–1954: Syracuse Nationals

Career highlights
- Consensus second-team All-American (1953); No. 33 Jersey retired by Kansas State Wildcats
- Stats at NBA.com
- Stats at Basketball Reference

Richard W. Knostman (August 9, 1931 – March 16, 2022) was an American professional basketball player.

He attended Wamego High School in Wamego, Kansas. A 6' 6" center, Knostman played at Kansas State University. He was a third-team All-American in 1951–52 and a second team All-American in 1952–53. He was also All-Conference in the Big 7 Conference in 1952 and 1953.

Knostman was a three-year lettermen for head coach Jack Gardner from 1950 to 1953. He helped guide the Wildcats to a 61–13 (.824) record, including three consecutive final top-10 finishes and a runner-up finish at the 1951 NCAA Final Four.

Knostman is one of just 12 players in Kansas State history to be named a first team All-American. He earned this recognition from the Helms Foundation, Look magazine and the Newspaper Enterprises Association as a senior in 1953 after averaging 22.7 points in helping the Wildcats to a 17–4 overall record and a final ranking of number 9 in the UPI and number 12 in the AP polls. Knostman was also recognized as a second team All-American by The Associated Press, United Press International, Colliers and International News Service.

Knostman first earned All-America accolades as a junior when he led Kansas State to a 19–5 overall record and a final ranking of number 3 in the AP and number 6 in the UPI polls. He averaged 16.3 points in 24 games en route to collecting second team All-American honors from the Converse Yearbook and third team accolades from The Associated Press. He was also twice selected first team All-Big Seven.

Knostman averaged 7.5 points in 29 games as a sophomore in 1950–51 in helping Kansas State advance to their first and only NCAA Championship game, where the Wildcats lost to Kentucky.

Despite having played over 50 years ago, Knostman still ranks among the top 5 in 17 single-game, season and/or career statistical categories in school history, including tops in most free throws attempted in a game (26 vs. Oklahoma on Feb. 14, 1953). He also ranks in the top 5 in several career categories, including second in free throws attempted (541), third in free throws made (349) and fifth in rebounding (774) and rebounding average (10.5 rpg.). Knostman also places second in single-season scoring average (22.7 ppg.; 1953) and third in rebounding average (13.3 rpg.; 1952). He is one of just 19 players in school history to top 1,000 points, while he ranks 13th on the all-time scoring list with 1,083 points and 14th in career scoring average (14.6 ppg.). Knostman remains one of the few Wildcats to average a double-double for his career with 14.6 points and 10.5 rebounds in 74 games.

Knostman was selected by the Syracuse Nationals in the 1953 NBA draft. His career lasted five games and he scored a total of 13 points.

He died on March 16, 2022, in Arizona.

== Career statistics ==
Legend
GP	Games played	GS	Games started	MPG	Minutes per game
FG%	Field goal percentage	3P%	3-point field goal percentage	FT%	Free throw percentage
RPG	Rebounds per game	APG	Assists per game	SPG	Steals per game
BPG	Blocks per game	PPG	Points per game	**Bold**	Career high

=== NBA ===
==== Regular season ====
Year	Team	GP	MPG	FG%	FT%	RPG	APG	PPG
1953–54	Syracuse	5	9.4	.300	.636	3.4	1.2	2.6
