= Kansas State Wildcats men's basketball =

NCAA Division I basketball program

2026–27 Kansas State Wildcats men's basketball team
- University: Kansas State University
- First season: 1902–03; 124 years ago
- Athletic director: Gene Taylor
- Head coach: Casey Alexander; 1st season, 0–0 (–)
- Location: Manhattan, Kansas, U.S.
- Arena: Bramlage Coliseum (capacity: 11,000)
- NCAA division: Division I
- Conference: Big 12
- Nickname: Wildcats
- Colors: Royal purple and white
- All-time record: 1,764–1,274 (.581)
- NCAA tournament record: 40–36 (.526)

NCAA Division I tournament runner-up
- 1951
Other NCAA Division I tournament results
Final Four	1948, 1951, 1958, 1964
Elite Eight	1948, 1951, 1958, 1959, 1961, 1964, 1972, 1973, 1975, 1981, 1988, 2010, 2018, 2023
Sweet Sixteen	1951, 1956, 1958, 1959, 1961, 1964, 1968, 1970, 1972, 1973, 1975, 1977, 1981, 1982, 1988, 2010, 2018, 2023
Appearances	1948, 1951, 1956, 1958, 1959, 1961, 1964, 1968, 1970, 1972, 1973, 1975, 1977, 1980, 1981, 1982, 1987, 1988, 1989, 1990, 1993, 1996, 2008, 2010, 2011, 2012, 2013, 2014, 2017, 2018, 2019, 2023

Conference tournament champions
- Big Eight: 1977, 1980

Conference regular-season champions
- MVIAA: 1917, 1919 Big Eight: 1948, 1950, 1951, 1956, 1958, 1959, 1960, 1961, 1963, 1964, 1968, 1970, 1972, 1973, 1977 Big 12: 2013, 2019

Uniforms
Home	Away
Alternate	Alternate

The Kansas State Wildcats men's basketball team represents Kansas State University in college basketball competition. The program is classified in the NCAA Division I, and is a member of the Big 12 Conference. Their Head Coach is Casey Alexander.

The program began competition in 1902. The first two major-conference regular season titles won by the school were won by the men's basketball team, in 1917 and 1919 (in the Missouri Valley Intercollegiate Athletic Association). Kansas State has gone on to win 19 regular season conference crowns. The Wildcats have appeared in the NCAA tournament 32 times, most recently in 2023. Kansas State's best season finish came in 1951, losing the national final to Kentucky. Jeff Sagarin listed the program 27th in his all-time rankings in the ESPN College Basketball Encyclopedia. Following the 2024-25 season, the Wildcats have a record of 1,752-1,254.

== History ==
Kansas State University has appeared in 32 NCAA basketball tournaments, most recently in 2023. The team's all-time record in the NCAA tournament is 39–35 (.527). Kansas State's best finish at the tournament came in 1951, when it lost to Kentucky in the national championship game. The school has reached the Final Four 4 times, the Elite Eight 14 times, and the Sweet Sixteen 18 times. Included among K-State's tournament wins are some all-time classics, including an 83–80 win over Oscar Robertson's Cincinnati team in 1958, which Sports Illustrated called "the most exciting game of the 1958 season," and a 50–48 win over second-ranked Oregon State in 1981, which USA Today listed as one of the greatest games in NCAA tournament history.

The team also had some notably successful seasons before the creation of the NIT (1938) and the NCAA tournament (1939), including conference titles in 1917 and 1919 under coach Zora Clevenger. The Helms Athletic Foundation named Frank Reynolds the program's first All-American player in 1917, and the Premo-Porretta Power Poll retroactively ranked Kansas State #12 in 1910, #18 in 1916, #8 in 1917 and #7 in 1919.

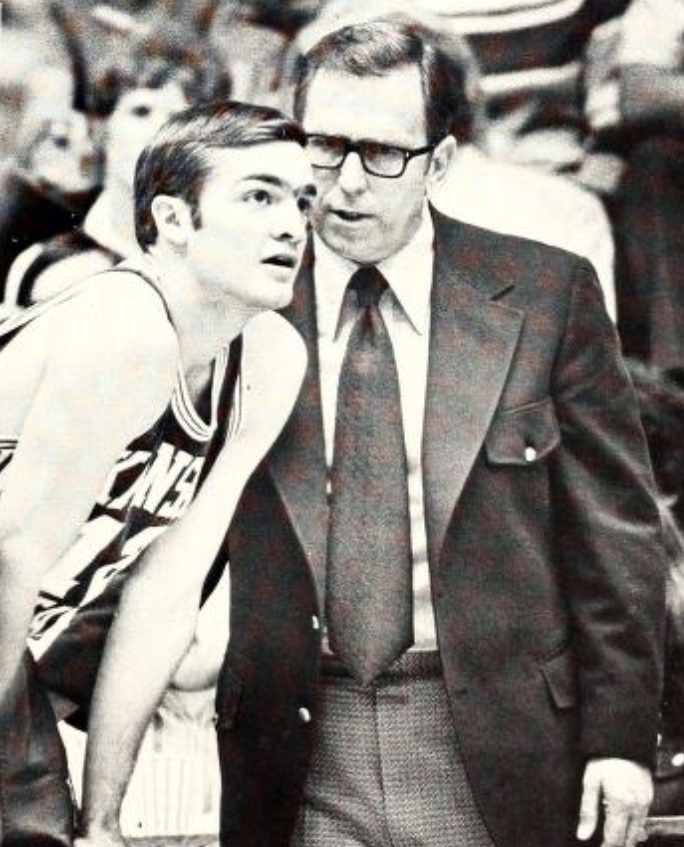
Big Eight Player of the Year Lon Kruger with coach Jack Hartman.

The best season in the school's history may have been 1959, when the team finished the season ranked #1 in the final Associated Press poll and Coaches poll. K-State has finished ranked in the Top 10 of one of the two polls on eleven total occasions (most recently in 2023), and in the final top 25 polls 22 total times. The team has also posted a winning record at home every year since 1946.

After a lengthy period with little success during the 1990s and 2000s, the team returned to prominence under head coach Frank Martin. Following a twelve-year absence, the team returned to the NCAA tournament after the 2007–08 season. Following that season, Kansas State freshman Michael Beasley was named an All-American and Big 12 Conference Player of the Year. In the 2009–10 season, the team spent much of the year ranked in the Top 10 of the AP poll and finished second in the Big 12. The team received a #2 seed in the 2010 NCAA Division I men's basketball tournament and advanced to the Elite Eight. Along the way, the Wildcats defeated Xavier in a double-overtime thriller, which CBSSports.com called "one of the best games in the history of the Sweet 16."

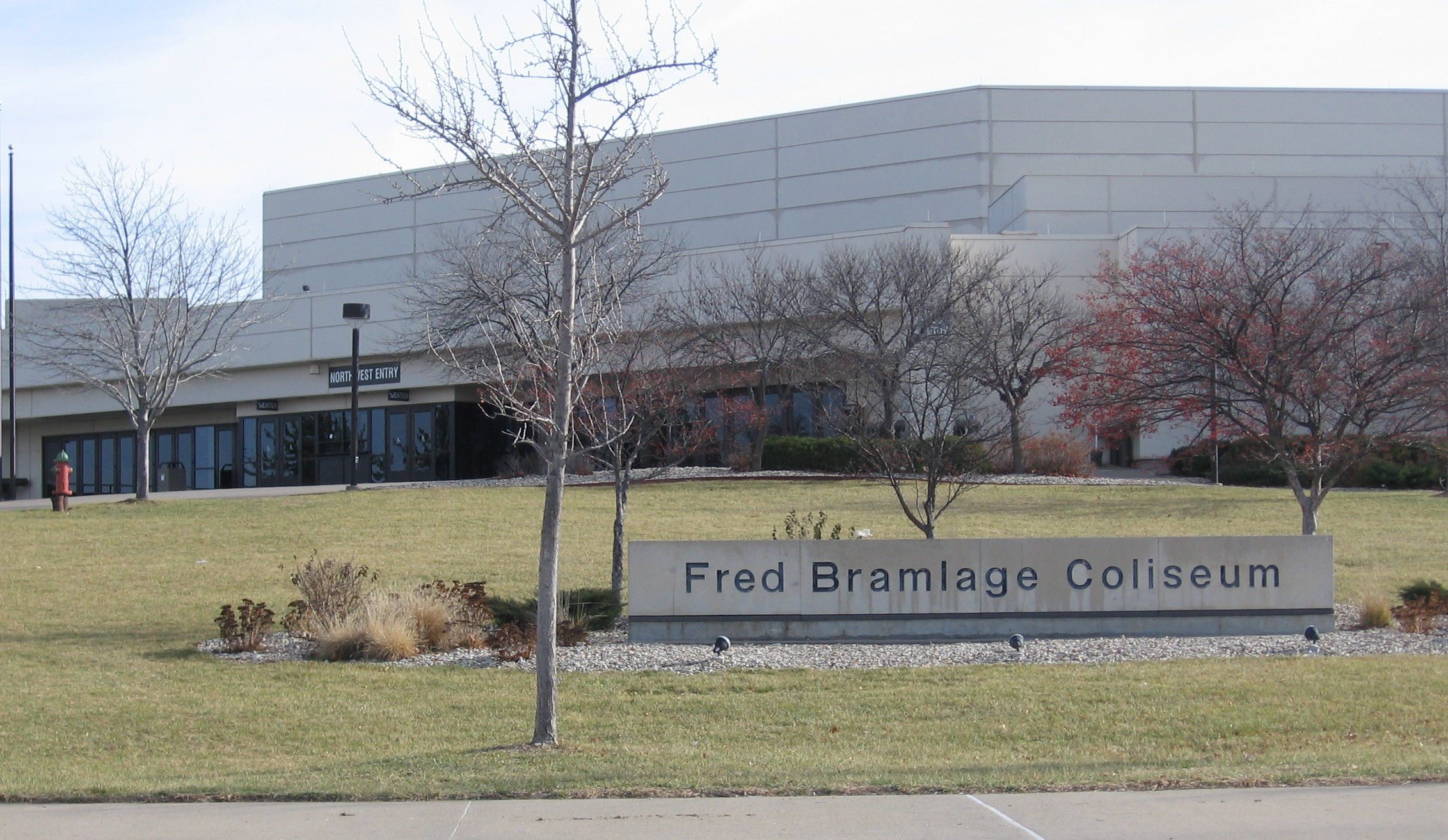
Bramlage Coliseum, home of KSU basketball

On March 31, 2012, Bruce Weber was announced as head coach after Frank Martin left for South Carolina. During the 2012–2013 season, Weber's first in Manhattan, Kansas State won its first regular season conference title since 1977 and advanced to the NCAA tournament. Weber's team won the conference title again in the 2018–2019 season. K-State appeared in the NCAA tournament five times in Weber's seven seasons, including advancing to the Elite Eight in 2018.

After three consecutive losing seasons, Weber resigned under pressure in March 2022. He was succeeded by longtime Baylor assistant coach Jerome Tang. In Tang's first season, he guided a KSU team picked to finish last in the Big 12 to a third-place finish and to the NCAA Tournament, the first NCAA appearance since 2019. With wins over Montana State, Kentucky, and Michigan State, Tang brought the Wildcats to its first Elite Eight appearance since 2018 and its fourteenth Elite Eight appearance in program history.

== Achievements ==
Kansas State has a total of 36 All-Americans, 19 regular-season conference championships and nine conference tournament championships.

The program ranks in the top 25 nationally in the following categories:

Top 25 All-Time	Ranking
Weeks ranked #1 in AP poll	16th (tie)
Weeks ranked in top 5 of AP poll	25th
NCAA Tournament appearances	22nd
NCAA Final Four appearances	22nd (tie)
NCAA Elite Eight appearances	6th (tie)
NCAA Sweet Sixteen appearances	12th
#1 NBA draft picks	3rd (tie)
NCAA Tournament wins	25th

The program also ranks in the top 50 nationally in the following categories:

Top 40 All-Time	Ranking
All-time wins (NCAA Division I)	42nd
Appearances in final AP poll	29th (tie)
Appearances in top 10 of AP poll	38th (tie)

=== Top 25 rankings ===
Kansas State University has finished in the final rankings of the AP poll or Coaches poll on 22 occasions throughout its history, including one season at #1 in the final polls (pre-NCAA Tournament). The AP poll first appeared in 1948, and has been published continuously since 1950–51. The Coaches poll began in the 1950–51 season. Currently, the final AP poll is released before the tournament and the final Coaches poll is released after the tournament.

Season	Final record	AP poll	Coaches poll
1949–50	17–7	14	n/a
1950–51	25–4	4	3
1951–52	19–5	3	6
1952–53	17–4	12	9
1956–57	15–8	—	20
1957–58	22–5	3	4
1958–59	25–2	1	1
1959–60	16–10	—	16
1960–61	22–5	4	4
1961–62	22–3	6	5
1962–63	16–9	—	19
1972–73	23–5	9	7
1974–75	20–9	15	—
1976–77	24–7	16	11
1979–80	22–9	—	20
1987–88	25–9	20	8
2009–10	29–8	7	7
2010–11	23–11	21	24
2012–13	27–8	12	20
2017–18	25–12	—	19
2018–19	25–9	18	19
2022–23	26–10	15	9

== Rivalries ==
=== Kansas: Sunflower Showdown ===
Kansas State's main rivalry is with the Kansas Jayhawks. The rivalry peaked in the 1950s when both teams were annually national title contenders. The 1987–88 season also proved to be momentous in the rivalry. In the first matchup of the season, on January 30, 1988, Mitch Richmond scored 35 points to lead Kansas State to a 72–61 win to halt KU's then-record 55-game home winning streak. On February 18, KU turned the tables, prevailing 64–63 at Ahearn Field House in Manhattan to deny K-State a victory over KU in the old field house's last year. In what was supposed to be the rubber game, in the 1988 Big Eight Conference men's basketball tournament, Kansas State won a decisive victory by a 69–54 score. However, the biggest was yet to come. Both teams qualified for the NCAA tournament, and after three wins each in the tournament they faced each other on March 27 in Pontiac, Michigan, for the right to advance to the Final Four. Led by Danny Manning's 20 points, KU turned a tight game into a runaway and prevailed 71–58. Kansas would go on to win the national championship.

The rivalry slipped in significance after the 1988 season, and from 1994 to 2005 KU won 31 straight games against K-State, the longest streak for either school in the series. KU also posted a 24-game win streak against the Wildcats in Manhattan, which ended on January 30, 2008, when #22 Kansas State upset #2 Kansas 84–75.

Jeff Sagarin's rankings of the nation's top programs by decade in the ESPN College Basketball Encyclopedia nicely track the history of the rivalry. In the 1950s, when the rivalry was at its peak, Kansas State finished the decade ranked as the #3 program in the nation and KU was ranked as #4. In the 1960s KU was ranked #9 for the decade and KSU was ranked #11. In the 1970s, the programs were again nearly even, with Kansas State ranked at #24 and KU at #25. In the 1980s some separation appeared, as KU finished the decade ranked at #19 and Kansas State at #31. The big difference appeared in the 1990s and 2000s when KU was ranked at #4 and #2 for the decades, while Kansas State does not appear anywhere in the top 40.

The rivalry has become more relevant again in recent years, with both teams ranked in the AP Top 25 for many of their match-ups.

=== Missouri ===
As of the 2022–23 season, Missouri is Kansas State's second most-played rival, with 237 games dating back to 1907. Kansas State leads the series 121–116. The series was last played regularly in the 2011–12 season, before Missouri moved to the Southeastern Conference. For nearly a century beforehand, the two schools shared conferences, beginning in the 1913–14 season in the Missouri Valley Conference, then in the Big Eight Conference and its predecessors from 1928 to 1996, and finally the Big 12 Conference from 1996 to 2012.

Since Missouri's move to the SEC, the two teams have matched up twice, meeting on neutral floors in 2015 and 2018, both Kansas State victories.

=== Wichita State ===
Kansas State had an ongoing in-state, out-of-conference rivalry with Wichita State, dating back to 1932 and last played in 2022. Kansas State leads the series 22–11. The series had six games from 1932 to 1964, then six games on a home-and-home rotation from the 1969–70 to 1971–72 seasons, and most recently 19 home-and-home games every season from 1985–86 to 2003–04.

When Wichita State became a Top 25 regular in the early 2010s, there came interest in reviving the series. In February 2013, Kansas state senator Michael O'Donnell introduced a bill requiring Kansas and Kansas State to schedule Wichita State.

The series was renewed in 2021, with a four-game series calling for games at Intrust Bank Arena in Wichita that year, at Bramlage Coliseum in 2022, T-Mobile Center in Kansas City in 2023, and finally at Charles Koch Arena in 2024.

== Postseason ==
=== NCAA tournament results ===
The Wildcats have appeared in the NCAA tournament 32 times. Their overall record in the NCAA Tournament is 40–36 (.526) through the 2023 tournament.

Year	Seed	Round	Opponent	Result
1948		Elite Eight; Final Four; National 3rd-place game	Wyoming; Baylor; Holy Cross	W 58–48; L 52–60; L 54–60
1951		Sweet Sixteen; Elite Eight; Final Four; National Championship	Arizona; BYU; Oklahoma A&M; Kentucky	W 61–59; W 64–54; W 68–44; L 58–68
1956		Sweet Sixteen; Regional 3rd-place game	Oklahoma City; Houston	L 93–97; W 89–70
1958		Sweet Sixteen; Elite Eight; Final Four; National 3rd-place game	Cincinnati; Oklahoma State; Seattle; Temple	W 83–80^{OT} W 69–57; L 51–73; L 57–67
1959		Sweet Sixteen; Elite Eight	DePaul; Cincinnati	W 102–70; L 75–85
1961		Sweet Sixteen; Elite Eight	Houston; Cincinnati	W 75–64; L 64–69
1964		Sweet Sixteen; Elite Eight; Final Four; National 3rd-place game	Texas Western; Wichita; UCLA; Michigan	W 64–60; W 94–93; L 84–90; L 90–100
1968		Sweet Sixteen; Regional 3rd-place game	TCU; Louisville	L 72–77; L 63–93
1970		Sweet Sixteen; Regional 3rd-place game	New Mexico State; Houston	L 66–70; W 107–98
1972		Sweet Sixteen; Elite Eight	Texas; Louisville	W 66–55; L 65–72
1973		Sweet Sixteen; Elite Eight	Southwestern Louisiana; Memphis State	W 66–63; L 72–92
1975		First round Sweet Sixteen; Elite Eight	Penn; Boston College; Syracuse	W 69–62; W 74–65; L 87–95^{OT}
1977		First round Sweet Sixteen	Providence; Marquette	W 87–80; L 66–67
1980	#7	First round Second round	#10 Arkansas #2 Louisville	W 71–53; L 69–71^{OT}
1981	#8	First round Second round Sweet Sixteen; Elite Eight	#9 San Francisco #1 Oregon State #4 Illinois #2 North Carolina	W 64–60; W 50–48; W 57–52; L 68–82
1982	#5	First round Second round Sweet Sixteen	#12 Northern Illinois #4 Arkansas #8 Boston College	W 77–68; W 65–64; L 65–69
1987	#9	First round Second round	#8 Georgia #1 UNLV	W 82–79^{OT} L 61–80
1988	#4	First round Second round Sweet Sixteen; Elite Eight	#13 La Salle #5 DePaul #1 Purdue #6 Kansas	W 66–53; W 66–58; W 73–70; L 58–71
1989	#6	First round	#11 Minnesota	L 75–86
1990	#11	First round	#6 Xavier	L 79–87
1993	#6	First round	#11 Tulane	L 53–55
1996	#10	First round	#7 New Mexico	L 48–69
2008	#11	First round Second round	#6 USC #3 Wisconsin	W 80–67; L 55–72
2010	#2	First round Second round Sweet Sixteen; Elite Eight	#15 North Texas #7 BYU #6 Xavier #5 Butler	W 82–62; W 84–72; W 101–96^{2OT} L 56–63
2011	#5	Second round Third Round	#12 Utah State #4 Wisconsin	W 73–68; L 65–70
2012	#8	Second round Third Round	#9 Southern Miss #1 Syracuse	W 70–64; L 59–75
2013	#4	Second round	#13 La Salle	L 61–63
2014	#9	Second round	#8 Kentucky	L 49–56
2017	#11	First Four; First round	#11 Wake Forest #6 Cincinnati	W 95–88; L 61–75
2018	#9	First round Second round Sweet Sixteen; Elite Eight	#8 Creighton #16 UMBC #5 Kentucky #11 Loyola Chicago	W 69–59; W 50–43; W 61–58; L 62–78
2019	#4	First round	#13 UC Irvine	L 64–70
2023	#3	First round Second round Sweet Sixteen; Elite Eight	#14 Montana State #6 Kentucky #7 Michigan State #9 Florida Atlantic	W 77–65; W 75–69; W 98–93^{OT} L 76–79

From 2011 to 2015 the round of 64 was known as the Second round, round of 32 was Third Round

=== NCAA tournament seeding history ===
The NCAA began seeding the tournament with the 1979 edition.

Years →	'80	'81	'82	'87	'88	'89	'90	'93	'96	'08	'10	'11	'12	'13	'14	'17	'18	'19	'23
Seeds→	7	8	5	9	4	6	11	6	10	11	2	5	8	4	9	11	9	4	3

=== NIT results ===
The Wildcats have appeared in the National Invitation Tournament (NIT) seven times. Their combined record is 6–9.

Year	Round	Opponent	Result
1976	Quarterfinals	Kentucky	L 76–81
1992	First round Second round	Western Kentucky; Notre Dame	W 85–74; L 48–64
1994	First round Second round Quarterfinals; Semifinals; 3rd-place game	Mississippi State; Gonzaga; Fresno State; Vanderbilt; Siena	W 78–69; W 66–64; W 115–77; L 76–82; L 79–92
1998	First round	NC State	L 39–59
1999	First round	TCU	L 71–72
2007	First round Second round	Vermont; DePaul	W 59–57; L 65–70
2009	First round Second round	Illinois State; San Diego State	W 83–79^{OT} L 52–70
2024	First round	Iowa	L 82-91

=== NCIT results ===
The Wildcats appeared in one of the only two ever National Commissioners Invitational Tournaments. Their record is 0–1.

Year	Round	Opponent	Result
1974	Quarterfinals	Bradley	L 64–68

== Individual awards and accomplishments ==
=== Retired jerseys ===
The following players' jerseys have been retired by Kansas State, though their respective jersey numbers remain available for use. They represent the finest basketball players to come through Kansas State. The criteria for determining the honor includes statistical achievement, conference and national records, honors received (such as all-conference, All-American, Academic All-American), character and sportsmanship.

Kansas State Wildcats retired jerseys
No.	Player	Position	Career	Year of Retirement
10	Chuckie Williams	SG	1972–1976	2006
12	Mike Evans	PG	1974–1978	2006
12	Lon Kruger	PG	1971–1974	2006
22	Ernie Barrett	F / G	1948–1951	2005
23	Mitch Richmond	SG	1986–1988	2009
25	Rolando Blackman	SG	1977–1981	2007
30	Bob Boozer	PF	1956–1959	2005
33	Jack Parr	C	1955–1958	2005
33	Dick Knostman	C	1950–1953	2007

44 - Willie Murrell SF 1962-1964 2009

=== National honors ===
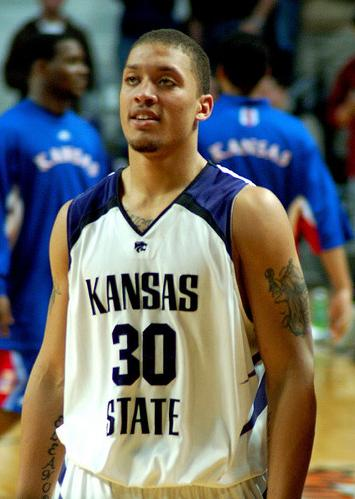
Michael Beasley was named National Freshman of the Year, an All-American and the Big 12 Player of the Year in 2008

The following Kansas State players and coaches are in the Naismith Memorial Basketball Hall of Fame (with induction year):

- Bob Boozer (2010) (as member of 1960 United States men's Olympic basketball team)
- Cotton Fitzsimmons (2021)
- Jack Gardner (1984)
- Mitch Richmond (2014)
- Tex Winter (2011)

The following Kansas State players and coaches are in the National Collegiate Basketball Hall of Fame (with induction year):

- Bob Boozer (2016)
- Rolando Blackman (2015)
- Jack Gardner (2006)
- Tex Winter (2010)

Kansas State players and coaches have won the following national awards:

Player honors

- USBWA National Freshman of the Year
  Best freshman

Michael Beasley – 2008

- Frances Pomeroy Naismith Award
  Outstanding undersized senior

Jacob Pullen – 2011

- Pete Newell Big Man Award
  Top low-post player

Michael Beasley – 2008

- Bob Cousy Award
  Top point guard

Markquis Nowell - 2023

Coaching honors

- NABC Coach of the Year Award
  Coach of the year

Jack Hartman – 1981

- UPI College Basketball Coach of the Year
  Coach of the year

Tex Winter – 1958

- Naismith College Coach of the Year
  Coach of the year

Jerome Tang – 2023

==== All-Americans ====
The following players were named first, second or third-team All-Americans by one of outlets used by the NCAA to determine consensus selections

Player	Year(s)	Team(s)
F. I. Reynolds	1917	Consensus First Team – Helms (1st)
Frank Groves	1937	Converse (3rd), Omaha World Newspaper (2nd)
Ernie Barrett	1951	Consensus Second Team – AP (2nd), UPI (3rd), Look Magazine (2nd), International News Service (1st)
Dick Knostman	1952	AP (3rd)
Dick Knostman	1953	Consensus Second Team – AP (2nd), UPI (2nd), Look Magazine (1st), NEA (1st), International News Service (2nd), Collier's (2nd)
Jack Parr	1958	NABC (3rd)
Bob Boozer	1958	Consensus First Team – AP (2nd), USBWA (1st), NABC (1st), UPI (2nd), NEA (2nd), International News Service (2nd)
Bob Boozer	1959	Consensus First Team – AP (1st), USBWA (1st), NABC (1st), UPI (1st), NEA (1st)
Mike Evans	1978	AP (3rd)
Rolando Blackman	1980	AP (3rd)
Rolando Blackman	1981	NABC (3rd)
Mitch Richmond	1988	Consensus Second Team – USBWA (2nd), UPI (2nd)
Michael Beasley	2008	Consensus First Team – AP (1st), USBWA (1st), USBWA (1st), SN (1st)
Jacob Pullen	2010	SN (3rd)
Jacob Pullen	2011	AP (3rd), NABC (3rd), SN (3rd)
Keyontae Johnson	2023	AP (3rd), NABC (3rd)
Markquis Nowell	2023	AP (3rd), USBWA (3rd), NABC (3rd), SN (3rd)

=== Conference honors ===
The Big Eight Conference established the Conference Player of the Year and Coach of the Year awards in 1957. These awards have continued into the Big 12 Conference era.

- Player of the Year

Bob Boozer – 1958, 1959
Lon Kruger – 1973, 1974
Mike Evans – 1978
Rolando Blackman – 1980
Michael Beasley – 2008

- Coach of the Year

Tex Winter – 1958, 1959, 1960
Cotton Fitzsimmons – 1970
Jack Hartman – 1975, 1977
Dana Altman – 1993
Frank Martin – 2010
Bruce Weber − 2013
Jerome Tang − 2023

=== Notable Wildcats to pros ===
The following former Wildcats have gone on to play professionally, either in the NBA or elsewhere. Kansas State University has had two overall #1 draft picks in the NBA since the draft began in 1947: Howie Shannon (1949) and Bob Boozer (1959).

- Ernie Barrett
- Michael Beasley
- Rolando Blackman
- Bob Boozer
- Barry Brown Jr.
- Norris Coleman
- Denis Clemente
- Larry Comley
- Cartier Diarra
- Mike Evans
- Marcus Foster
- Carl R. Gerlach
- Cortez Groves
- Thomas Gipson
- David Hall
- Jordan Henriquez
- Steve Henson
- Lew Hitch
- Jim Iverson
- Wes Iwundu
- D.J. Johnson
- Keyontae Johnson
- Askia Jones
- Wally Judge
- Curtis Kelly
- Dick Knostman
- Lon Kruger
- Cartier Martin
- Jeremiah Massey
- Mike McGuirl
- Rodney McGruder
- Steve Mitchell
- Willie Murrell
- Ed Nealy
- Markquis Nowell
- Jack Parr
- Jacob Pullen
- Mitch Richmond
- Ángel Rodríguez
- Nick Russell
- Jamar Samuels
- Howie Shannon
- Mark Smith
- Xavier Sneed
- Dominique Sutton
- Dean Wade
- Bill Walker
- Jeff Webb
- Chuckie Williams
- Gene Williams

==== Draft history ====
NBA/ABA Draft Picks
Round	Pick	Overall	Player	Year
1st	1st	1st	Howie Shannon	1949
1st	1st	1st	Bob Boozer	1959
1st	2nd	2nd	Michael Beasley	2008
1st	5th	5th	Mitch Richmond	1988
1st	7th	7th	Ernie Barrett	1951
1st	9th	9th	Rolando Blackman	1981
1st	15th	15th	Chuckie Williams	1976
2nd	10th	19th	Lew Hitch	1951
1st	21st	21st	Mike Evans	1978
2nd	9th	24th	Gene Williams	1969
4th	6th	31st	Willie Murrell	1964
2nd	3rd	33rd	Wes Iwundu	2017
2nd	15th	38th	Norris Coleman	1987
2nd	17th	44th	Steve Henson	1990
2nd	17th	47th	Bill Walker	2008
2nd	20th	50th	Keyontae Johnson	2023
10th	2nd	70th	Jack Parr	1958
10th	8th	91st	Larry Comley	1961
8th	5th	166th	Ed Nealy	1982

=== Former players as coaches ===
A number of former Wildcat players have gone to successful careers as head basketball coaches, including:

- Bob Chipman – finished career as 21st-winningest coach in college basketball history
- Mike Evans
- Bill Guthridge – National college coach of the year (1998)
- Steve Henson
- Tim Jankovich
- Gene Keady – 4x national college coach of the year; National Collegiate Basketball Hall of Fame
- Lon Kruger – Coached five Division I schools to the NCAA tournament
- Jim Molinari
- Brad Underwood

== Coaches ==
Kansas State has had 23 head coaches. A number of notable and successful coaches have led the Wildcats through the years. Following are all the coaches that have been at Kansas State.

Coach	Years at KSU	W	L	Win%	Conf. W	Conf. L	Conf. Win %	Awards and Achievements During Tenure
Charles W. Melick	1905–1906	7	9	.438	N/A	N/A	N/A	
Mike Ahearn	1906–1911	26	24	.520	N/A	N/A	N/A	
Guy Lowman	1911–1914	30	16	.652	0	10	.000	
Carl J. Merner	1914–1916	19	15	.559	13	13	.500	
Zora Clevenger	1916–1920	54	17	.761	38	16	.704	• Highest winning percentage in program history • 2 Conference regular season championships (1917, 1919)
E.A. Knoth	1920–1921	14	6	.700	11	4	.733	• Highest conference winning percentage in program history
E.C. Curtiss	1921–1923	5	28	.152	5	27	.156	
Charles Corsaut	1923–1933	89	81	.524	61	63	.492	
Frank Root	1933–1939	38	72	.345	19	47	.287	
Jack Gardner^{†}^	1939–1942; 1946–1953	147	81	.645	66	46	.589	• NCAA Championship Game (1951) • 2 Final Fours (1948, 1951) • 2 Elite Eights (1948, 1951) • 1 Sweet Sixteen (1951) • 2 NCAA Tournament appearances (1948, 1951) • 3 Conference regular season championships (1948, 1950, 1951) • 3 Conference Holiday tournament championships (1947, 1950, 1952) • 2 times ranked in top 6 of final AP and UPI polls (1951, 1952)
Chili Cochrane	1942–1943	6	14	.300	1	9	.100	
Cliff Rock	1943–1944	7	15	.318	1	9	.100	
Fritz Knorr	1944–1946	14	33	.298	6	14	.300	
Tex Winter^{†}^	1953–1968	261	118	.689	154	57	.730	• 2 Final Fours (1958, 1964) • 4 Elite Eights (1958, 1959, 1961,1964) • 6 Sweet Sixteens (1956, 1958, 1959, 1961, 1964, 1968) • 6 NCAA Tournament appearances (1956, 1958, 1959, 1961, 1964, 1968) • 8 Conference regular season championships (1956, 1958–1961, 1963, 1964, 1968) • 4 Conference Holiday tournament championships (1958, 1960, 1961, 1963) • Ranked No. 1 in final AP and UPI polls (1959) • 4 times ranked in top 6 of final AP and UPI polls (1958, 1959, 1961, 1962) • UPI National Coach of the Year (1958) • Big 7 Coach of the Year (1958) • 2× Big 8 Coach of the Year (1959, 1960) • Undefeated conference season (14–0) (1959) • Developed the Triangle offense
Cotton Fitzsimmons	1968–1970	34	20	.630	19	9	.679	• 1 Sweet Sixteen (1970) • 1 NCAA Tournament Appearance (1970) • 1 Conference regular season Championship (1970) • Big 8 Coach of the Year (1970) • NABC District Coach of the Year (1970)
Jack Hartman	1970–1986	295	169	.636	133	91	.594	• 4 Elite Eights (1972, 1973, 1975, 1981) • 6 Sweet Sixteens (1972, 1973, 1975, 1977, 1981, 1982) • 7 NCAA Tournament appearances (1972, 1973, 1975, 1977, 1980–1982) • 1 NIT Tournament Appearance (1976) • 3 Conference regular season championships (1972, 1973, 1977) • 2 Conference tournament championships (1977, 1980) • NABC Coach of the Year (1980) • 2× Big 8 Coach of the Year (1975, 1977) • NABC District Coach of the Year (1977) • Most wins in program history
Lon Kruger^	1986–1990	81	46	.638	34	22	.607	• 1 Elite Eight (1988) • 1 Sweet Sixteen (1988) • 4 NCAA Tournament appearances (1987–1990) • NABC District Coach of the Year (1988) • Only KSU coach to take squads to NCAA Tournament in four consecutive seasons
Dana Altman	1990–1994	68	54	.557	19	37	.339	• 1 NCAA Tournament Appearance (1993) • 2 NIT Tournament appearances (1992, 1994) • Big 8 Coach of the Year (1993)
Tom Asbury	1994–2000	85	88	.491	29	63	.315	• 1 NCAA Tournament Appearance (1996) • 2 NIT Tournament appearances (1998, 1999)
Jim Wooldridge	2000–2006	83	90	.480	32	64	.333	
Bob Huggins^{†}	2006–2007	23	12	.657	10	6	.625	• 1 NIT Tournament Appearance (2007)
Frank Martin	2007–2012	117	54	.684	50	32	.610	• 1 Elite Eight (2010) • 1 Sweet Sixteen (2010) • 4 NCAA Tournament appearances (2008, 2010–2012) • 1 NIT Tournament Appearance (2009) • Big 12 Coach of the Year (AP & Coaches) (2010) • Highest NCAA seed (2) in program history (2010) • Most wins (29) in one season (2010) • CollegeInsider.com Big 12 Coach of the Year (2008) • Jim Phelan Award as mid-season National Coach of the Year (2009–10) • USBWA District VI Coach of the Year (2010) • NABC District 8 Coach of the Year (2010) • Only KSU coach to win 20 or more games in first 5 seasons
Bruce Weber	2012–2022	184	147	.556	82	98	.456	• 1 Elite Eight (2018) • 1 Sweet Sixteen (2018) • 5 NCAA Tournament appearances (2013, 2014, 2017-2019) • 2 Conference regular season championships (2013, 2019) • Big 12 Coach of the Year (AP & Coaches) (2013) • USBWA District VI Coach of the Year (2013) • NABC District 8 Coach of the Year (2013) • Most wins (27) in the first year (2013) • Most wins (47) in the first 2 years • Most conference wins (14) in the first year (2013) • Most conference wins (24) in the first 2 years • Most conference wins (32) in the first 3 years • Most all-time Top 25 victories (27) • Only KSU coach to win 25 or more games in back to back seasons
Jerome Tang	2022–2026	71	57	.555	29	39	.426	• 1 Elite Eight (2023) • 1 Sweet Sixteen (2023) • 1 NCAA Tournament Appearance (2023) • Naismith College Coach of the Year (2023) • College Hoops Today Coach of the Year (2023) • Big 12 Coach of the Year (AP & Coaches) (2023) • USBWA District VI Coach of the Year (2023) • NABC District 8 Coach of the Year (2023) • Most Top 25 wins in a single season (7)
Matthew Driscoll	2026 interim	2	5	.286	2	5	.286	
Casey Alexander	2026-present	0	0	–	0	0	–	

†Inducted into the Naismith Memorial Basketball Hall of Fame
^Inducted into the National Collegiate Basketball Hall of Fame

== Conference membership history ==
- ?–1912: Kansas Intercollegiate Athletic Association
- 1913–1927: Missouri Valley Intercollegiate Athletic Association
- 1928–1947: Big 6 Conference
- 1948–1957: Big 7 Conference
- 1958–1995: Big 8 Conference
- 1996–Present: Big 12 Conference

== Series records ==
=== Record vs. Big 12 opponents ===
Kansas State vs.	Overall record	at Manhattan	at Opponent's Venue	at neutral site	Last 5 meetings	Last 10 meetings	Current streak	Big 12 era Games
Arizona	KSU, 8-6	KSU, 5-0	UA, 4-2	UA, 2-1	UA, 3-2	Tied, 5-5	L 3	Tied, 0-0
Arizona State	ASU, 5-4	KSU, 2-1	ASU, 2-1	ASU, 2-1	KSU, 3-2	ASU,4-5	L 1	Tied, 0-0
Baylor	KSU, 26–25	KSU, 14–11	BU, 11–9	tied, 3–3	KSU, 3–2	BU, 7–3	W 3	BU, 24–21
BYU	KSU, 5-4	KSU, 1-0	BYU, 3-1	KSU, 3–1	KSU, 3–2	KSU, 5–4	W 1	tied, 1-1
Cincinnati	UC, 8-1	UC, 2-0	UC, 3-0	UC, 3–1	UC, 5–0	UC, 8–1	L 7	UC, 1-0
Colorado	KSU, 96–48	KSU, 54–11	CU, 33–32	KSU, 10–4	CU, 4–1	KSU, 6–4	L 5	tied, 0-0
Houston	KSU, 5-4	tied, 1-1	UH, 3-1	KSU, 3–0	UH, 3–2	KSU, 5–4	L 1	UH, 1-0
Iowa State	KSU, 146–93	KSU, 85–29	KSU, 54–53	ISU, 11–7	KSU, 3–2	KSU, 6–4	W 1	ISU, 30–29
Kansas	KU, 203–97	KU, 81–50	KU, 95–35	KU, 29–11	KU, 3–2	KU, 8–2	L 1	KU, 58–8
Oklahoma State	KSU, 86–59	KSU, 43–18	OSU, 37–28	KSU, 15–4	KSU, 3–2	OSU, 6–4	L 1	OSU, 24–20
TCU	KSU, 21–13	KSU, 9–7	KSU, 8–3	KSU, 4–3	TCU, 3–2	tied, 5-5	L 2	KSU, 18–11
Texas Tech	KSU, 26–23	KSU, 18–5	TTU, 17–7	tied, 1–1	TTU, 3–2	TTU, 7–3	L 2	TTU, 22–19
UCF	KSU, 3-0	KSU, 2-0	tied, 0–0	KSU, 1–0	KSU, 3-0	KSU, 3–0	W 3	KSU, 1-0
Utah	KSU, 2-1	KSU, 1-0	KSU, 1-0	Utah, 1-0	KSU, 2-1	KSU, 2-1	L 1	Tied, 0-0
West Virginia	WVU, 16–12	KSU, 8–4	WVU, 9–4	WVU, 3–0	KSU, 3–2	tied, 5–5	W 2	WVU, 15–11
*As of July 13, 2024

=== Record vs. former Big 12 opponents ===
Kansas State vs.	Overall record	at Manhattan	at Opponent's Venue	at neutral site	Last 5 meetings	Last 10 meetings	Current streak	Last meeting
Missouri	KSU, 121–116	KSU, 62–44	MU, 64–42	KSU, 17–8	KSU, 5–0	KSU, 7–3	W 5	Nov 19, 2018
Nebraska	KSU, 128–93	KSU, 69–35	NU, 55–39	KSU, 20–3	KSU, 5–0	KSU, 8–2	W 7	Dec 17, 2022
Oklahoma	OU, 114–104	KSU, 65–38	OU, 67–28	KSU, 11–9	OU, 4–1	OU, 6–4	L 1	Jan 30, 2024
Texas	KSU, 25–23	KSU, 11–10	UT, 12–11	KSU, 3–1	KSU, 3–2	UT, 7–3	W 1	Mar 13, 2024
Texas A&M	KSU, 18–10	KSU, 11–1	TAMU, 8–3	KSU, 4–1	TAM, 3–2	tied, 5–5	L 3	Jan 30, 2021
*As of July 13, 2024

== See also ==
- List of teams with the most victories in NCAA Division I men's college basketball
- NCAA Division I Men's Final Four appearances by school
