= Jack Parr =

American basketball player (1936–2015)

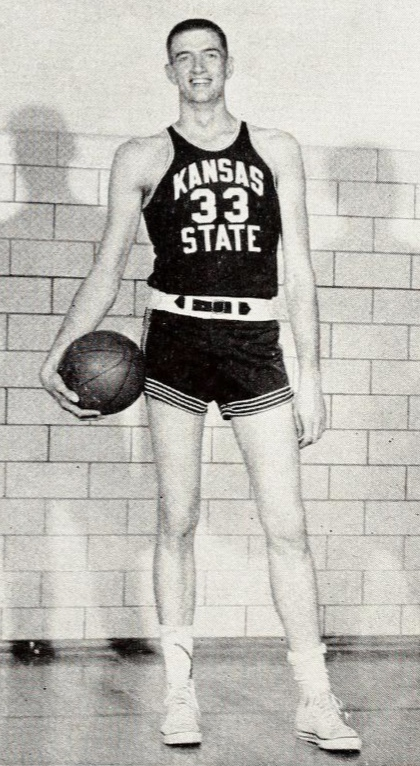
- Parr as a senior at Kansas State

Personal information
- Born: March 13, 1936 Louisville, Kentucky, U.S.
- Died: January 4, 2015 (aged 78) Lindsborg, Kansas, U.S.
- Listed height: 6 ft 9 in (2.06 m)
- Listed weight: 220 lb (100 kg)

Career information
- High school: St. Christopher's (Richmond, Virginia)
- College: Kansas State (1955–1958)
- NBA draft: 1958: 10th round, 70th overall pick
- Drafted by: Cincinnati Royals
- Playing career: 1958–1959
- Position: Center
- Number: 16

Career history
- 1958–1959: Cincinnati Royals

Career highlights
- Third-team All-American – NABC (1958); 3× First-team All-Big Eight (1956–1958); No. 33 Jersey retired by Kansas State Wildcats

Career NBA statistics
- Points: 262 (4.0 ppg)
- Rebounds: 278 (4.2 rpg)
- Assists: 51 (0.8 apg)
- Stats at NBA.com
- Stats at Basketball Reference

Jack Parr (March 13, 1936 – January 4, 2015) was an American professional basketball player for the Cincinnati Royals of the National Basketball Association (NBA). He played college basketball for the Kansas State Wildcats.

== Career ==
Parr was born in Louisville, Kentucky. He played college basketball at Kansas State University and was drafted by the Cincinnati Royals in the 10th round of the 1958 NBA draft. He played 66 games for the Royals in 1958–1959, averaging 4.0 points per game.

Three times Parr gained all-league honors. Twice he helped the Wildcats to conference championships and NCAA play and twice received All-America recognition. He still holds the Wildcats single-season rebounding record and is second overall. He ranks 10th among the all-time Wildcat scoring leaders with 1,184 points. Parr played one season professionally with the Cincinnati Royals before turning to private business and becoming a Big Eight basketball official.

== Career statistics ==
Legend
GP	Games played	GS	Games started	MPG	Minutes per game
FG%	Field goal percentage	3P%	3-point field goal percentage	FT%	Free throw percentage
RPG	Rebounds per game	APG	Assists per game	SPG	Steals per game
BPG	Blocks per game	PPG	Points per game	**Bold**	Career high

=== NBA ===
==== Regular season ====
Year	Team	GP	MPG	FG%	FT%	RPG	APG	PPG
1958–59	Cincinnati	66	15.7	.355	.603	4.2	.8	4.0
