= Mike Evans (basketball) =

American basketball coach and former player

Personal information
- Born: April 19, 1955 (age 71) Goldsboro, North Carolina, U.S.
- Listed height: 6 ft 1 in (1.85 m)
- Listed weight: 170 lb (77 kg)

Career information
- High school: Laurinburg Institute (Laurinburg, North Carolina)
- College: Kansas State (1974–1978)
- NBA draft: 1978: 1st round, 21st overall pick
- Drafted by: Denver Nuggets
- Playing career: 1979–1989
- Position: Point guard
- Number: 1, 5
- Coaching career: 1990–2009

Career history

Playing
- 1979–1980: San Antonio Spurs
- 1980–1982: Milwaukee Bucks
- 1982: Cleveland Cavaliers
- 1982–1983: Montana Golden Nuggets
- 1983–1988: Denver Nuggets
- 1988–1989: Ipifim Torino

Coaching
- 1990–1994; 1998–2001: Denver Nuggets (assistant)
- 2001–2002: Denver Nuggets (interim)
- 2007–2009: Toronto Raptors (assistant)
- 2010–2011: Halifax Rainmen
- 2011–2012: Moncton Miracles

Career highlights
- Third-team All-American – AP (1978); Big Eight Player of the Year (1978); 3× First-team All-Big Eight (1976–1978); No. 12 Jersey retired by Kansas State Wildcats

Career NBA statistics
- Points: 4,531 (7.7 ppg)
- Rebounds: 808 (1.4 rpg)
- Assists: 1,514 (2.6 apg)
- Stats at NBA.com
- Stats at Basketball Reference

Michael Leeroyall Evans (born April 19, 1955) is an American former National Basketball Association (NBA) player and coach. He played collegiately at Kansas State University where he is Kansas State's second all-time leading points scorer, behind Jacob Pullen, with 2,115 points. He was drafted by the Denver Nuggets with the 21st pick of the 1978 NBA draft and had a 9-year NBA career with four teams (the San Antonio Spurs, Milwaukee Bucks, Cleveland Cavaliers, and the Denver Nuggets). He was widely regarded throughout his career as an excellent 3-point shooter, being among the league leaders in that statistical category during his stint in Denver.

After his retirement as a player, he became an assistant coach with the Nuggets. In 2001, when Dan Issel was fired, Evans assumed coaching duties for the remainder of the 2001–02 season, after which Jeff Bzdelik was hired as the team's head coach. In 2006–07 he was a scout for the Toronto Raptors. He then joined the Raptors' coaching staff in 2007–08. He was fired in the 2009 off-season.

== NBA career statistics ==
Legend
GP	Games played	GS	Games started	MPG	Minutes per game
FG%	Field goal percentage	3P%	3-point field goal percentage	FT%	Free throw percentage
RPG	Rebounds per game	APG	Assists per game	SPG	Steals per game
BPG	Blocks per game	PPG	Points per game	**Bold**	Career high

=== Regular season ===
Year	Team	GP	GS	MPG	FG%	3P%	FT%	RPG	APG	SPG	BPG	PPG
1979–80	San Antonio	79	-	15.8	.448	.286	.682	1.4	2.9	0.8	**0.1**	6.2
1980–81	Milwaukee	71	-	12.8	.460	.143	.781	1.2	2.4	0.5	**0.1**	4.5
1981–82	Milwaukee	14	0	14.0	.471	.000	.667	0.9	1.6	0.6	0.0	4.0
1981–82	Cleveland	8	0	9.3	.314	.000	.625	1.3	2.5	0.5	0.0	3.4
1982–83	Denver	42	**5**	16.5	.473	.000	.805	1.4	2.7	0.5	**0.1**	6.3
1983–84	Denver	78	**5**	**21.6**	.431	.360	.847	**1.8**	**3.7**	0.8	**0.1**	8.1
1984–85	Denver	**81**	0	17.7	**.489**	.363	**.863**	1.5	2.9	0.8	**0.1**	**10.1**
1985–86	Denver	**81**	1	17.1	.425	.222	.846	1.2	2.2	0.8	0.0	9.5
1986–87	Denver	**81**	4	19.3	.458	.314	.780	1.6	2.3	**1.0**	**0.1**	**10.1**
1987–88	Denver	56	0	11.7	.453	**.396**	.811	0.9	1.4	0.6	**0.1**	6.1
Career		591	15	16.7	.452	.307	.807	1.4	2.6	0.7	0.1	7.7

=== Playoffs ===
Year	Team	GP	GS	MPG	FG%	3P%	FT%	RPG	APG	SPG	BPG	PPG
1979–80	San Antonio	2	-	6.0	.375	**.500**	.750	1.0	1.0	0.0	0.0	5.5
1980–81	Milwaukee	4	-	9.5	**.529**	.000	.875	0.3	1.5	0.0	**0.3**	6.3
1982–83	Denver	8	-	**22.9**	.486	.300	.647	**2.4**	**4.8**	0.6	0.0	**10.8**
1983–84	Denver	5	-	15.4	.321	.125	**1.000**	0.6	2.4	0.0	0.0	4.6
1984–85	Denver	**15**	0	18.7	.434	.333	.824	2.1	3.1	0.9	0.2	10.3
1985–86	Denver	10	0	20.4	.366	.241	.833	2.0	2.5	1.0	**0.3**	9.2
1986–87	Denver	3	0	19.0	.368	.286	**1.000**	2.3	2.7	1.0	0.0	6.0
1987–88	Denver	11	**1**	19.9	.395	.273	.933	2.0	2.1	**1.1**	0.0	10.5
Career		58	1	18.5	.414	.284	.825	1.8	2.8	0.7	0.1	9.1

== Head coaching record ==
Legend
Regular season	G	Games coached	W	Games won	L	Games lost	W–L %	Win–loss %
Playoffs	PG	Playoff games	PW	Playoff wins	PL	Playoff losses	PW–L %	Playoff win–loss %

Team	Year	G	W	L	W–L%	Finish	PG	PW	PL	PW–L%	Result
Denver	2001–02	56	18	38	.321	6th in Midwest	—	—	—	—	Missed playoffs
Career		56	18	38	.321		—	—	—	—	
