= Denis Clemente =

Puerto Rican basketball player

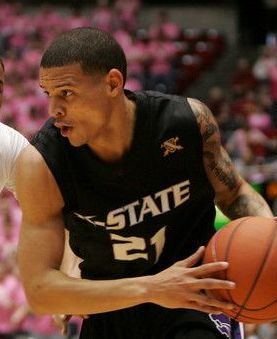
- Clemente at Kansas State against Iowa State

No. 16 – Mets de Guaynabo
- Position: Point guard
- League: Baloncesto Superior Nacional

Personal information
- Born: April 10, 1986 (age 40) Bayamón, Puerto Rico
- Listed height: 6 ft 1 in (1.85 m)
- Listed weight: 175 lb (79 kg)

Career information
- High school: Calusa Preparatory School
- College: Miami (Florida) (2006–2008); Kansas State (2008–2010)
- NBA draft: 2010: undrafted
- Playing career: 2010–present

Career history
- 2010–2011: Maccabi Rishon Lezion
- 2011–2014: Caciques de Humacao
- 2014–2017: Capitanes de Arecibo
- 2017–2018: Fuerza Regia de Monterrey
- 2018–2020: Mineros de Zacatecas
- 2021: Cangrejeros de Santurce
- 2022: Brujos de Guayama
- 2023: Capitanes de Arecibo
- 2024–2025: Santeros de Aguada
- 2025: Piratas de Quebradillas
- 2026–present: Mets de Guaynabo

Denis Clemente (born April 10, 1986, in Bayamón, Puerto Rico) is a Puerto Rican professional basketball player for the Mets de Guaynabo of the Baloncesto Superior Nacional (BSN). He played collegiately in the United States with the Kansas State University Wildcats, and led the team to the Elite 8 round of the 2010 NCAA Tournament, before losing to the Butler Bulldogs. He is a 6'1, 175 pound combo guard.

Clemente graduated from Kansas State in 2010, and he entered the 2010 NBA draft. After he went undrafted, he played in the NBA Summer League with the Charlotte Bobcats, but was cut prior to training camp. In December 2010 he signed with Greek club Maroussi BC. In September 2011 he signed with Slovak club BK Bemaco SPU Nitra. In 2011 he was selected Rookie of the Year in Puerto Rico's Professional league. He has also had a stint playing professional basketball in Mexico.

== Personal life ==
He is the second cousin of Major League Baseball Hall of Fame player Roberto Clemente.
