= Jacob Pullen =

American basketball player (born 1989)

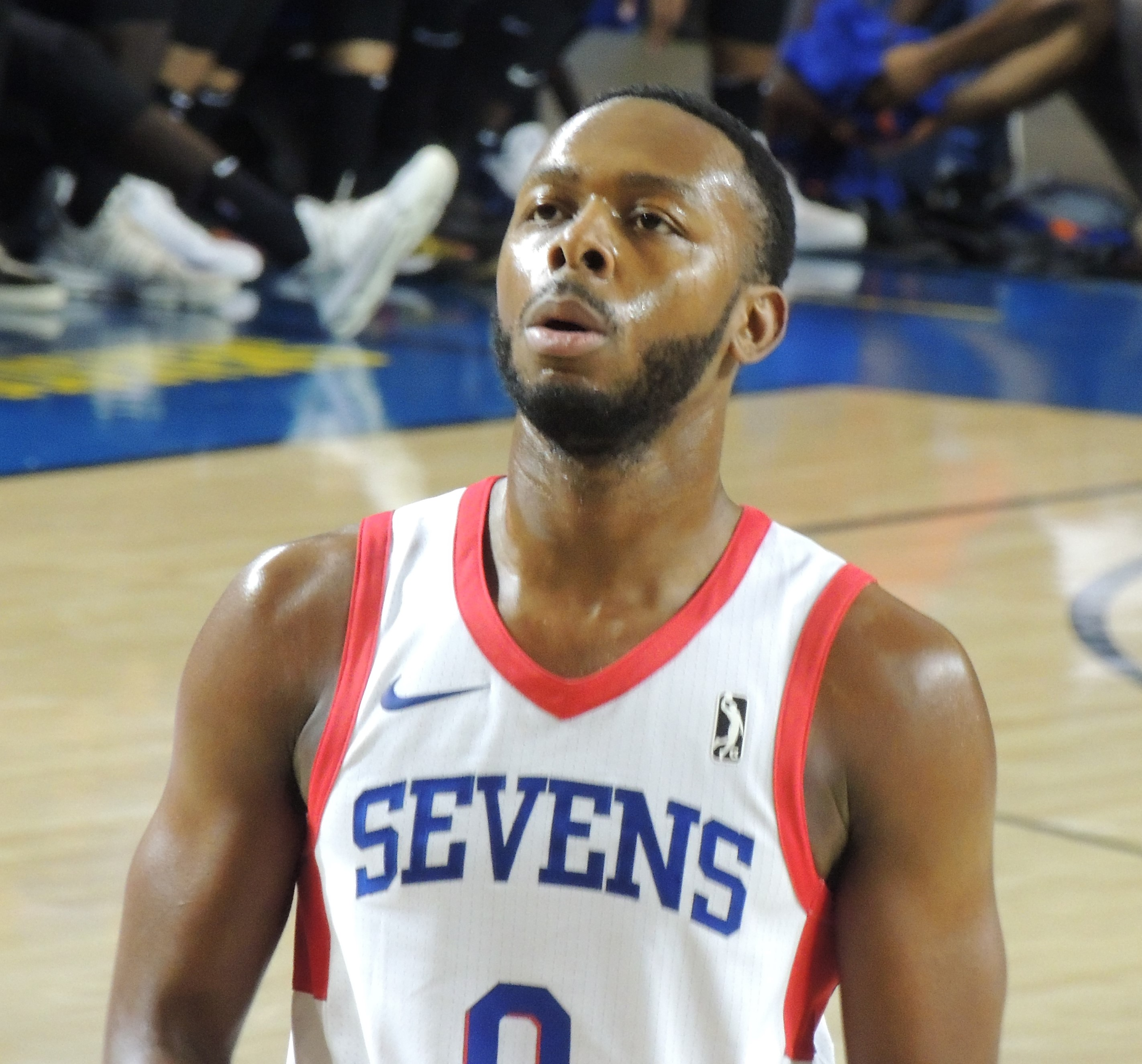
- Pullen with the Delaware 87ers in 2017

No. 0 – MKE Ankaragücü
- Position: Point guard
- League: TBL

Personal information
- Born: November 10, 1989 (age 37) Maywood, Illinois, U.S.
- Listed height: 6 ft 0 in (1.83 m)
- Listed weight: 200 lb (91 kg)

Career information
- High school: Proviso East (Maywood, Illinois)
- College: Kansas State (2007–2011)
- NBA draft: 2011: undrafted
- Playing career: 2011–present

Career history
- 2011–2012: Biella
- 2012–2013: Hapoel Jerusalem
- 2013: Virtus Bologna
- 2013–2014: Barcelona
- 2014: Sevilla
- 2014–2015: Brindisi
- 2015–2016: Cedevita
- 2016–2017: Khimki
- 2017–2018: Philadelphia 76ers
- 2017–2018: →Delaware 87ers
- 2018: Mahram Tehran
- 2018: Afyon
- 2018–2019: Cedevita
- 2019–2021: Mornar
- 2021–2022: Cedevita Olimpija
- 2022–2023: Kuwait SC
- 2023–2024: Napoli
- 2024: Tezenis Verona
- 2024–2025: Napoli
- 2025–2026: Dinamo Sassari
- 2026–present: MKE Ankaragücü

Career highlights
- Spanish League champion (2014); Croatian League champion (2016); 2× Croatian Cup winner (2016, 2019); Slovenian League winner (2022); Slovenian Cup winner (2022); Italian Cup winner (2024); 2× All-ABA League Team (2016, 2019); 2× Third-team All-American – SN (2010, 2011); Third-team All-American – AP, NABC (2011); 2× First-team All-Big 12 (2010, 2011); Frances Pomeroy Naismith Award (2011)
- Stats at NBA.com
- Stats at Basketball Reference

Jacob Everse Pullen (born November 10, 1989) is an American-Georgian professional basketball player for MKE Ankaragücü of the Türkiye Basketbol Ligi (TBL). He played for the Kansas State Wildcats. Pullen has both American and Georgian citizenship, and has played for the Georgian national team.

== College career ==
In his college debut against Sacramento State, Pullen scored 18 points on 7-of-11 shooting and ended up scoring in double figures in eight of his first 10 games. He was a large part of Kansas State's renewed basketball success. As a freshman, he was one of just three players who appeared in all 33 games. Alongside Michael Beasley, he helped upset #2 Kansas with a season-high 20 points, going 10-for-10 from the free throw line.

In the 2008–09 season, Pullen was one of only two players to start all 34 games for the Wildcats (Luis Colon was the other). He notched his career best of 38 points against Kansas on Feb. 14, 2011. He recorded at least one steal in 27 games of the 2009 season and had at least one three-pointer in 29 games.

In the 2009–10 season, Pullen continued his strong play in his junior season, leading Kansas State to a 29–8 overall record (11–5, Big 12), with wins at Dayton, at UNLV, at Alabama, against Xavier, and against then undefeated, #1-ranked Texas. Playing under coach Frank Martin, Pullen averaged 19.3 points per game on 41.9% shooting. With backcourt mate Denis Clemente, Pullen received accolades for his part in the turnaround in K-State's basketball. In 2009–2010, Pullen and Clemente combined for the third-highest points-per-game of any guard tandem in school history, at almost 35 combined points. They trailed only the combo of Mike Evans and Chuckie Williams (who averaged more in both the 1974–75, and 1975–76 seasons) in the K-State record books. The two led the Wildcats to the Elite Eight of the NCAA Tournament before eventually losing to Butler. Pullen was selected to the All Big-12 Team that year. As a senior, Pullen and the Cats lost to Wisconsin in the third round of the NCAA tournament and he was named a Fourth Team All-American by Fox Sports. Pullen is the All Time Scoring Leader in the history of Kansas State University Men's Basketball with 2,132 career points.

== Professional career ==
=== 2011–12 season ===
Pullen went undrafted in the 2011 NBA draft. On July 12, 2011, he signed with Angelico Biella of the Italian Lega Basket Serie A for the 2011–12 season.

=== 2012–13 season ===
In July 2012, Pullen joined the Philadelphia 76ers for the 2012 NBA Summer League. On August 31, 2012, he signed with Hapoel Jerusalem of the Israeli Basketball Super League for the 2012–13 season. On March 13, 2013, he signed with Virtus Bologna of Italy for the rest of the season.

=== 2013–14 season ===
On August 13, 2013, Pullen signed with FC Barcelona of Spain for the 2013–14 season. On 8 March 2014, Pullen scored 12 three-point field goals in a 111–66 win over CB Valladolid, breaking the Liga ACB single-game record, which was previously held by Oscar Schmidt.

=== 2014–15 season ===
In August 2014, he signed with Liaoning Flying Leopards of the Chinese Basketball Association. However, he left Liaoning before the start of the season. On September 28, 2014, Pullen returned to Spain and signed with Baloncesto Sevilla. On November 7, 2014, he parted ways with Sevilla.

On November 14, 2014, he signed with New Basket Brindisi of Italy for the rest of the season.

=== 2015–16 season ===
On August 8, 2015, Pullen signed with Cedevita Zagreb of Croatia for the 2015–16 season.

=== 2016–17 season ===
On September 29, 2016, Pullen signed a one-month deal with Russian club Khimki. On October 31, he re-signed with Khimki for the rest of the season. He was officially released from the Russian team on July 4, 2017.

=== 2017–18 season ===
On September 22, 2017, Pullen signed with the Philadelphia 76ers. On October 14, his contract was converted to a two-way deal. Under terms of the deal, he split time between the 76ers and their G League affiliate, the Delaware 87ers. On January 4, 2018, he was waived by the 76ers after appearing in three NBA games.

On January 7, 2018, Pullen signed with Mahram Tehran of the Iranian Super League for the rest of the season.

On February 20, 2018, Pullen signed with Afyon Belediye of the Turkish second-tier Turkish Basketball First League (TBL). With Afyon, he won promotion to the first-tier Basketbol Süper Ligi (BSL) after winning the play-off finals.

=== 2018–19 season ===
On November 1, 2018, Pullen returned to Cedevita Zagreb for his second stint with the club.

=== Mornar (2019–2021) ===
On July 12, 2019, Pullen signed with Montenegrin club Mornar Bar of the ABA League.

Pullen averaged 16 points, three assists, and 1.4 assists per game during the 2020–21 season with Mornar Bar.

=== 2021–22 season ===
On August 9, 2021, Pullen signed with KK Cedevita Olimpija of the Slovenian Basketball League.

=== 2023–24 season ===
On August 26, 2023, he signed with Napoli Basket of the Italian Lega Basket Serie A (LBA).

=== 2025–26 season ===
On November 28, 2025, he signed with Dinamo Sassari of the Italian Lega Basket Serie A (LBA).

== National team career ==
In August, 2012, Pullen was granted Georgian citizenship, which increased his career options across Europe and allowed him to play for the Georgian national team in EuroBasket 2013. He began playing with the team during EuroBasket qualification in 2012.

== NBA statistics ==
| Year | Team | GP | GS | MPG | FG% | 3P% | FT% | RPG | APG | SPG | BPG | PPG |
|---|---|---|---|---|---|---|---|---|---|---|---|---|
| 2017–18 | Philadelphia | 3 | 0 | 2.0 | .500 | .000 | — | .0 | .0 | .0 | .0 | .7 |
| Career | | 3 | 0 | 2.0 | .500 | .000 | — | .0 | .0 | .0 | .0 | .7 |

== See also ==
- 2010 NCAA Men's Basketball All-Americans
