= 2009–10 Pacific-10 Conference men's basketball season =

2009–10 Pac-10 Men's Basketball Season
- League: NCAA Division I
- Sport: Basketball
- Teams: 10

Regular Season

Tournament

Basketball seasons
- 08–09 10–11

2009–10 Pacific-10 Conference men's basketball standings
	Conf.				Overall
Team	W		L	PCT	W		L	PCT
California	13	–	5	.722	24	–	11	.686
Arizona State	12	–	6	.667	22	–	11	.667
Washington †	11	–	7	.611	26	–	10	.722
Arizona	10	–	8	.556	16	–	15	.516
USC*	8	–	10	.444	16	–	14	.533
Oregon State	8	–	10	.444	14	–	18	.438
UCLA	8	–	10	.444	14	–	18	.438
Stanford	7	–	11	.389	14	–	17	.452
Oregon	7	–	11	.389	16	–	16	.500
Washington State	6	–	12	.333	16	–	15	.516
† Conference tournament winner As of March 25, 2010; Rankings from AP Poll * Ineligible for conference tournament

The 2009–10 Pacific-10 Conference men's basketball season began with practices on October 17, 2009 and ended with the Pac-10 Tournament on March 10–13, 2010 at the Staples Center in Los Angeles.

== Pre-season ==
- Tim Floyd, the head coach at USC resigned and was replaced by Kevin O'Neill, who was on the Arizona staff.
- Pre-season media day is scheduled for October 29.
- 2009–10 PAC-10 Men's Basketball Media Poll:

1. California (25 first place votes)
2. Washington (7)
3. UCLA (5)
4. Arizona
5. Oregon State
6. Oregon
7. Arizona State
8. Washington State
9. USC
10. Stanford

- In the ESPN/USA poll: California, No. 12; Washington, No. 13.
- In the AP poll: California, No. 13; Washington, No. 14.
- In the ESPN The Magazine: California, No. 10; Washington, No. 13; UCLA, No. 30; Oregon State, No. 36

== Rankings ==
- November 2, 2009 – Washington (0–0) #14 (AP), #13 (Coaches); California (0–0) #13 (AP), #12 (Coaches)
- November 16, 2009 – Washington (3–0) #14 (AP), #14 (Coaches); California (2–0) #13 (AP), #12 (Coaches)
- November 23, 2009 – Washington (4–0) #14 (AP), #14 (Coaches); California (2–2) #23 (Coaches)
- November 30, 2009 – Washington (5–0) #12 (AP), #10 (Coaches); California (4–2) #25 (Coaches)
- December 7, 2009 – Washington (6–1) #17 (AP), #16 (Coaches)
- December 14, 2009 – Washington (6–2) #24 (AP), #21 (Coaches)
- December 21, 2009 – Washington (7–2) #22 (AP), #19 (Coaches)
- December 28, 2009 – Washington (9–2) #17 (AP), #16 (Coaches)
- January 4, 2010 – Washington (10–3) #24 (AP), #22 (Coaches)

== Conference games ==
- January 23, 2010 – Five conference teams are tie for second place, and the Oregon schools are last.
- January 23, 2010 – Washington has lost all road games, including four conference games.
- January 31, 2009 – After playing 9 conference games, California and Arizona are tied for first place with 6 wins and 3 losses, followed by Arizona State and UCLA at third place with a 5–4 conference record.
- February 4, 2010 – Four teams tied for first place, Arizona, Arizona State, California and UCLA.

== Conference tournament ==
- March 10–13, 2010 at the Staples Center in Los Angeles, California
- Tournament winner became the NCAA tournament automatic qualifier
- USC did not participate in the conference tournament this season

First Round; March 10
8	Oregon	82
9	Washington State	80

Quarterfinals; March 11
1	California	90
8	Oregon	74
4	Arizona	69
5	UCLA	75
2	Arizona State	61
7	Stanford	70
3	Washington	59
6	Oregon State	52

Semifinals; March 12
1	California	85
5	UCLA	72
7	Stanford	64
3	Washington	79

Final; March 13
1	California	75
3	Washington	79

== Head coaches ==
Sean Miller, Arizona
Herb Sendek, Arizona State
Mike Montgomery, California
Ernie Kent, Oregon
Craig Robinson, Oregon State
Johnny Dawkins, Stanford
Ben Howland, UCLA
Kevin O'Neill, USC
Lorenzo Romar, Washington
Ken Bone, Washington State

== Postseason ==
=== NCAA tournament ===
- Thurs., Mar. 18, – No. 11 Washington def. No. 6 Marquette 80–78, San Jose, CA (East Region)
- Fri., Mar. 19, – No. 8 California def. No. 9 Louisville 77–62, Jacksonville, FL (South Region)
- Sat., Mar. 20 – Washington def. New Mexico 82–64, San Jose, Calif. (East Region)
- Sun., Mar. 21 – Duke def. California 68–53, Jacksonville, FL (South Region)
- Thu., Mar. 25 – West Virginia def. Washington 69–56, Carrier Dome, Syracuse, New York (East Region)

=== NIT ===
- Tues., Mar. 18 – No. 8-seed Jacksonville def. No. 1-seed Arizona State 67–66, (first round, Arizona State bracket)

=== CBI ===
- Wed., Mar. 19 – Boston University def. Oregon State 96–78, 7 p.m. (first round, Gill Coliseum)

== Highlights and notes ==
=== November ===
- 50 former Pac-10 players were listed on the NBA opening day rosters, the average of 5.0 player per conference team tops among all conferences, with 14 former UCLA players are on the teams.
- November 26, 2009 – UCLA's loss to Portland 74–47 was the worst defeat during the Ben Howland era.

=== December ===
- December 1, 2009 – UCLA head coach Ben Howland announced that by mutual agreement, sophomore forward Drew Gordon is no longer a member of the team. Gordon will transfer at the end of the school quarter.
- December 6, 2009 – After winning just one in their first four games, the Beavers won three games in a row.

=== January ===
- January 3, 2010 – USC Athletic Director Mike Garrett announced that the school is forfeiting the 2007–08 season's victories, not participating in any post season tournaments in 2010 and reducing the number of scholarships for two years for violation of NCAA rules.

=== March ===
- Oregon State basketball coach Craig Robinson has agreed to a two-year contract extension, through the 2015–16 season.
- March 17, 2010 – California's Omondi Amoke was suspended for team rules violation going into the NCAA tournament.
- March 17, 2010 – Oregon head coach Ernie Kent's contract was terminated effective June 30.
- March 19, 2010 – Oregon athletic director Mike Bellotti step down to join ESPN as a football analyst.

=== June ===
- June 10, 2010 – NCAA to release the report of its investigation of the USC basketball team.
- June 10, 2010 – Colorado Buffaloes join the Pac-10 as its 11th member.

== Awards and honors ==
Three guards from the Pac-10 Conference have been named to the pre-season John R. Wooden Award list: Nic Wise, Arizona; Jerome Randle, California; Isaiah Thomas, Washington.

=== Scholar-Athlete of the Year ===
- Senior Landry Fields, Stanford – Scholar-Athlete of the Year, presented by Toyo Tires

=== Player-of-the-Week ===
- Nov. 16 – Quincy Pondexter, WASH
- Nov. 23 – Klay Thompson, WSU
- Nov. 30 – Klay Thompson, WSU
- Dec. 7 – Quincy Pondexter, WASH
- Dec. 14 – Patrick Christopher, CAL
- Dec. 21 – Alex Stepheson, USC
- Dec. 28 – Mike Gerrity, USC
- Jan. 4 – Michael Dunigan, ORE
- Jan. 11 – Ty Abbott, ASU
- Jan. 18 – Quincy Pondexter, WASH
- Jan. 25 – Landry Fields, STAN
- Feb. 1 – Nic Wise, ARIZ
- Feb. 8 – Quincy Pondexter, WASH
- Feb. 15 – Jerome Randle, CAL
- Feb. 22 – Landry Fields, STAN
- Mar. 1 – Jamal Boykin, CAL
- Mar. 8 – Quincy Pondexter, WASH

=== All-Pac-10 teams ===
- Player of The Year: Jerome Randle, California
- Freshman of The Year: Derrick Williams, Arizona
- Defensive Player of The Year: Seth Tarver, Oregon State
- Most Improved Player of The Year: Nikola Vucevic, USC
- Coach of The Year: Herb Sendek, Arizona State

FIRST TEAM:

Name	School	Pos.	Year	Hometown
Ty Abbott	ASU	G	Jr.	Phoenix, ARIZ
Patrick Christopher	CAL	G	Sr.	Compton, Calif.
Landry Fields	STAN	G/F	Sr.	Long Beach, Calif.
Quincy Pondexter	WASH	F	Sr.	Fresno, Calif.
Jerome Randle	CAL	G	Sr.	Chicago, Ill.
Michael Roll	UCLA	G	Sr.	Aliso Viejo, Calif.
Isaiah Thomas	WASH	G	So.	Tacoma, Wash.
Klay Thompson	WSU	G	So.	Ladera Ranch, Calif.
Derrick Williams	ARIZ	F	Fr.	La Mirada, Calif.
Nic Wise	ARIZ	G	Sr.	Houston, Texas

=== All-Academic ===
First Team:

Player, School	Year	GPA	Major
Mustafa Abdul-Hamid, UCLA	Jr.	3.81	Global Studies
Landry Fields, Stanford	Sr.	3.03	Communication
Nikola Koprivica, Washington State	Sr.	3.32	International Studies
Roeland Schaftenaar, Oregon State	Sr.	3.17	Business
Drew Shiller, Stanford	Sr.	3.14	Communication

Second Team:

Player, School	Year	GPA	Major
Jorge Gutierrez, California	So.	3.09	Undeclared
Malcolm Lee, UCLA	So.	3.13	Undeclared
Abe Lodwick, Washington State	So.	3.26	Communication
Garrett Sim, Oregon	So.	3.08	Undeclared
Jack Trotter, Stanford	So.	3.31	Undeclared

== NBA draft ==
Round	Pick	Player	Position	Nationality	Team	School/club team
1	26	Quincy Pondexter	SF	United States	Oklahoma City Thunder (from Phoenix, traded to New Orleans)	Washington (Sr.)
2	39	Landry Fields	SG	United States	New York (from L.A. Clippers via Denver)	Stanford (Sr.)
