= 2009–10 Arizona State Sun Devils men's basketball team =

American college basketball season

2009–10 Arizona State Sun Devils men's basketball

NIT, First Round
- Conference: Pacific-10 Conference
- Record: 22–11 (12–6 Pac-10)
- Head coach: Herb Sendek
- Assistant coaches: Dedrique Taylor; Scott Pera; Lamont Smith
- Home arena: Wells Fargo Arena

2009–10 Pacific-10 Conference men's basketball standings
	Conf.				Overall
Team	W		L	PCT	W		L	PCT
California	13	–	5	.722	24	–	11	.686
Arizona State	12	–	6	.667	22	–	11	.667
Washington †	11	–	7	.611	26	–	10	.722
Arizona	10	–	8	.556	16	–	15	.516
USC*	8	–	10	.444	16	–	14	.533
Oregon State	8	–	10	.444	14	–	18	.438
UCLA	8	–	10	.444	14	–	18	.438
Stanford	7	–	11	.389	14	–	17	.452
Oregon	7	–	11	.389	16	–	16	.500
Washington State	6	–	12	.333	16	–	15	.516
† Conference tournament winner As of March 25, 2010; Rankings from AP Poll * Ineligible for conference tournament

The 2009–10 Arizona State Sun Devils men's basketball team represented Arizona State University during the 2009–10 NCAA Division I men's basketball season. The head coach was Herb Sendek. The Sun Devils played their home games at the Wells Fargo Arena and are members of the Pacific-10 Conference. The Sun Devils finished with 22–11, 12–6 in Pac-10 play and lost in the quarterfinals of the 2010 Pacific-10 Conference men's basketball tournament to Stanford. They earn to the trip to the 2010 National Invitation Tournament, where they lost to Jacksonville in the first round.

== Departures ==
The Sun Devils lost James Harden and Jeff Pendergraph they were both averaging over 10 points per game.

== Roster ==
Number	Name	Position	Height	Weight	Year	Hometown	High School/Last College
2	Eric Boateng	Center	6–10	257	Senior	London, England	Duke University/St. Andrew's School
3	Ty Abbott	Guard	6–3	207	Junior	Phoenix, AZ	Desert Vista HS
10	Jamelle McMillan	Guard	6–2	180	Junior	Seattle, WA	O'Dea HS
11	Brandon Thompson	Guard	6–0	180	Freshman	San Antonio, TX	John Paul Stevens HS
12	Derek Glasser	Guard	6–1	190	Senior	Marina Del Rey, CA	Artesia HS
22	Victor Rudd	Forward	6–7	207	Freshman	Los Angeles, CA	Henderson Intl School
23	Ruslan Pateev	Center	7–0	231	Freshman	Moscow, RUS	Montverde Acad.
24	Trent Lockett	Guard	6–4	211	Freshman	Golden Valley, MN	Hopkins Sr. HS
25	Marcus Jackson	Guard	6–1	190	Freshman	Sacramento, CA	Sheldon HS
30	Rihards Kuksiks	Guard/Forward	6–6	210	Junior	Riga, Latvia	Florida Air Acad.
32	Taylor Rohde	Forward/Center	6–8	235	Sophomore	Phoenix, AZ	Pinnacle HS
33	Alex English	Cener	6–10	235	Junior	Phoenix, AZ	Colgate University/Paradise Valley HS
40	Demetrius Walker	Guard	6–2	195	Freshman	Phoenix, AZ	St. Mary's HS
44	Jerren Shipp	Guard	6–3	208	Senior	Los Angeles, CA	Fairfax HS

== Schedule ==
Date time, TV	Rank^{#}	Opponent^{#}	Result	Record	Site (attendance) city, state
Regular Season
11/13/2009*; 7:00 pm, FSAZ		Western Illinois	W 87–35	1–0	Wells Fargo Arena (8,992); Tempe, AZ
11/16/2009*; 9:00 pm, ESPNU		Texas State; NIT Season Tip-Off First Round	W 84–62	2–0	Wells Fargo Arena (5,457); Tempe, AZ
11/17/2009*; 9:30 pm, ESPN2		TCU; NIT Season Tip-Off Quarterfinals	W 52–49	3–0	Wells Fargo Arena (5,622); Tempe, AZ
11/20/2009*; 4:30 pm		San Francisco	W 104–65	4–0	Wells Fargo Arena (7,569); Tucson, AZ
11/25/2009*; 7:00 pm, ESPN2		vs. No. 7 Duke; NIT Season Tip-Off Semifinals	L 53–64	4–1	Madison Square Garden (N/A); New York City, NY
11/30/2008*; 6:00 pm, ESPN2		vs. LSU; NIT Season Tip-Off 3rd place game	W 71–52	5–1	Madison Square Garden (N/A); New York City, NY
11/30/2009*; 5:00 pm, FSAZ		Arkansas-Pine Bluff	W 72–57	6–1	Wells Fargo Arena (6,800); Tempe, AZ
12/03/2009*; 8:30 pm, FSN		Baylor; Big 12/Pac-10 Hardwood Series	L 61–64	6–2	Wells Fargo Arena (7,948); Tempe, AZ
12/08/2009*; 8:00 pm, The Mtn.		at BYU	L 68–81	6–3	Marriott Center (11,587); Provo, UT
12/12/2009*; 2:00 pm		Delaware State	W 76–34	7–3	Wells Fargo Arena (5,977); Tempe, AZ
12/19/2009*; 4:30 pm, FSAZ		San Diego State	W 55–52	8–3	Wells Fargo Arena (10,055); Tempe, AZ
12/21/2009*; 6:30 pm		UC Santa Barbara	W 69–42	9–3	Wells Fargo Arena (6,549); Tempe, AZ
12/23/2009*; 2:00 pm, FSAZ		USC Upstate	W 61–52	10–3	Wells Fargo Arena (6,549); Tempe, AZ
12/31/2009; 2:30 pm, FSN		at UCLA	L 70–72	10–4 (0–1)	Pauley Pavilion (8,008); Los Angeles, CA
01/02/2010; 8:30 pm, FSAZ		at USC	L 37–47	10–5 (0–2)	Galen Center (5,917); Los Angeles, CA
01/08/2010; 8:30 pm, FSAZ		No. 24 Washington	W 68–51	11–5 (1–2)	Wells Fargo Arena (7,682); Tempe, AZ
01/10/2010; 12:30 pm, FSN		Washington State	W 71–46	12–5 (2–2)	Wells Fargo Arena (6,433); Tempe, AZ
01/14/2010; 6:30 pm, CSNNW		at Oregon	W 76–57	13–5 (3–2)	McArthur Court (7,117); Eugene, OR
01/16/2010; 4:30 pm, FSAZ		at Oregon State	W 66–57	14–5 (4–2)	Gill Coliseum (7,472); Corvallis, OR
01/23/2010; 7:30 pm, FSAZ		Arizona	L 58–77	14–6 (4–3)	Wells Fargo Arena (13,966); Tempe, AZ
01/28/2010; 6:30 pm, FSAZ		California	L 70–78	14–7 (4–4)	Wells Fargo Arena (10,745); Tempe, AZ
01/30/2010; 2:00 pm		Stanford	W 88–70	15–7 (5–4)	Wells Fargo Arena (9,406); Tempe, AZ
02/04/2010; 8:00 pm		at Washington State	W 81–70	16–7 (6–4)	Beasley Coliseum (7,360); Pullman, WA
02/06/2010; 8:30 pm, FSN		at Washington	L 56–79	16–8 (6–5)	Bank of America Arena (10,000); Seattle, WA
02/11/2010; 7:30 pm		Oregon State	W 56–46	17–8 (7–5)	Wells Fargo Arena (6,962); Tempe, AZ
02/13/2010; 4:00 pm, FSAZ		Oregon	W 61–51	18–8 (8–5)	Wells Fargo Arena (7,618); Tempe, AZ
02/21/2010; 3:30 pm, FSN		at Arizona	W 73–69	19–8 (9–5)	McKale Center (14,631); Tucson, AZ
02/25/2010; 8:00 pm		at Stanford	W 68–60	20–8 (10–5)	Maples Pavilion (6,661); Stanford, CA
02/27/2010; 1:00 pm, FSN		at California	L 46–62	20–9 (10–6)	Haas Pavilion (11,877); Berkeley, CA
03/04/2010; 6:30 pm, FSN		USC	W 59–54	21–9 (11–6)	Wells Fargo Arena (7,304); Tempe, AZ
03/06/2010; 2:00 pm, CBS		UCLA	W 56–46	22–9 (12–6)	Wells Fargo Arena (9,039); Tempe, AZ
2010 Pacific-10 Conference men's basketball tournament
03/11/2010; 7:00 pm, FSN		vs. Stanford; Quarterfinals	L 61–70	22–10	Staples Center (N/A); Los Angeles, CA
NIT
03/16/2010*; 8:00 pm, ESPN2		Jacksonville; First Round	L 66–67	22–11	Wells Fargo Arena (2,968); Tempe, AZ
*Non-conference game. ^{#}Rankings from AP Poll. (#) Tournament seedings in parentheses. All times are in Mountain Time.
