= 2009–10 Arizona Wildcats men's basketball team =

American college basketball season

2009–10 Arizona Wildcats men's basketball
- Conference: Pacific-10 Conference
- Record: 16–15 (10–8 Pac-10)
- Head coach: Sean Miller (1st season)
- Assistant coaches: Archie Miller; James Whitford; Emanuel Richardson
- Home arena: McKale Center

2009–10 Pacific-10 Conference men's basketball standings
	Conf.				Overall
Team	W		L	PCT	W		L	PCT
California	13	–	5	.722	24	–	11	.686
Arizona State	12	–	6	.667	22	–	11	.667
Washington †	11	–	7	.611	26	–	10	.722
Arizona	10	–	8	.556	16	–	15	.516
USC*	8	–	10	.444	16	–	14	.533
Oregon State	8	–	10	.444	14	–	18	.438
UCLA	8	–	10	.444	14	–	18	.438
Stanford	7	–	11	.389	14	–	17	.452
Oregon	7	–	11	.389	16	–	16	.500
Washington State	6	–	12	.333	16	–	15	.516
† Conference tournament winner As of March 25, 2010; Rankings from AP Poll * Ineligible for conference tournament

The 2009–10 Arizona Wildcats men's basketball team represented the University of Arizona during the 2009–10 NCAA Division I men's basketball season. The Wildcats, led by first year head coach Sean Miller, played their home games at the McKale Center and are members of the Pacific-10 Conference.

== Recruiting class ==
College recruiting information
Name	Hometown	School	Height	Weight	Commit date
Solomon Hill; SF	Los Angeles, California	Fairfax High School	6 ft 6 in (1.98 m)	210 lb (95 kg)	Nov 11, 2009
Solomon Hill; SF	Recruit ratings: Scout: Rivals: (92)				
Lamont Jones; SG	Harlem, New York	Oak Hill Academy (Virginia)	6 ft 0 in (1.83 m)	190 lb (86 kg)	Jun 24, 2009
Lamont Jones; SG	Recruit ratings: Scout: Rivals: (88)				
Kyryl Natyazhko; C	Dnipropetrovsk, Ukraine	IMG Academy (Florida)	6 ft 11 in (2.11 m)	250 lb (110 kg)	Apr 13, 2009
Kyryl Natyazhko; C	Recruit ratings: Scout: Rivals: (94)				
Kevin Parrom; SF	Bronx, New York	South Kent High School (Connecticut)	6 ft 6 in (1.98 m)	200 lb (91 kg)	May 3, 2009
Kevin Parrom; SF	Recruit ratings: Scout: Rivals: (91)				
Derrick Williams; PF	La Mirada, California	La Mirada High School	6 ft 8 in (2.03 m)	215 lb (98 kg)	Jun 29, 2009
Derrick Williams; PF	Recruit ratings: Scout: Rivals: (92)				
Overall recruit ranking: Scout: 12 Rivals: 12 ESPN: NR
Note: In many cases, Scout, Rivals, 247Sports, On3, and ESPN may conflict in their listings of height and weight.; In these cases, the average was taken. ESPN grades are on a 100-point scale.; Sources: "ESPN". ESPN.; "2009 Team Ranking". Rivals.

== Roster ==
2009–10 Arizona Wildcats men's basketball team
Players
Coaches

Pos.	#	Name	Height	Weight	Year	Hometown
C	1	Kyryl Natyazhko	6 ft 10 in (2.08 m)	255 lb (116 kg)	Fr	Dnipropetrovsk, Ukraine
G/F	3	Kevin Parrom	6 ft 6 in (1.98 m)	205 lb (93 kg)	Fr	Bronx, New York
G	12	Lamont Jones	6 ft 0 in (1.83 m)	200 lb (91 kg)	Fr	Harlem, New York
G	13	Nic Wise	5 ft 10 in (1.78 m)	180 lb (82 kg)	Sr	Houston, Texas
G	20	Dondre Wise	6 ft 1 in (1.85 m)	215 lb (98 kg)	So	Houston, Texas
G	21	Kyle Fogg	6 ft 3 in (1.91 m)	185 lb (84 kg)	So	Brea, California
F	23	Derrick Williams	6 ft 8 in (2.03 m)	235 lb (107 kg)	Fr	La Mirada, California
G	24	Brendon Lavender	6 ft 5 in (1.96 m)	205 lb (93 kg)	So	Mesa, Arizona
F	42	Jamelle Horne	6 ft 7 in (2.01 m)	215 lb (98 kg)	Jr	San Diego, California
F	44	Solomon Hill	6 ft 6 in (1.98 m)	230 lb (104 kg)	Fr	Los Angeles, California
C	50	Alex Jacobson	7 ft 0 in (2.13 m)	245 lb (111 kg)	RS So	Brea, California
F	52	Max Wiepking	6 ft 6 in (1.98 m)	193 lb (88 kg)	Fr	Englewood, Colorado}note=W

Head coach

- Sean Miller (Pittsburgh)

Assistant coach(es)

- Archie Miller (NC State)
- James Whitford (Wisconsin)
- Emanuel Richardson (Pitt–Johnstown)

Legend

- (C) Team captain
- (S) Suspended
- (I) Ineligible
- (W) Walk-on
- Injured
- Current redshirt

Roster
Last update: July 4, 2011

=== Depth chart ===
Pos.	Starting 5	Bench 1	Bench 2
C	Derrick Williams	Kyryl Natyazhko	Alex Jacobson
PF	Jamelle Horne
SF	Solomon Hill	Kevin Parrom
SG	Kyle Fogg	Brendon Lavender
PG	Nic Wise	Lamont Jones	Dondre Wise

== Schedule ==
Date time, TV	Rank^{#}	Opponent^{#}	Result	Record	Site (attendance) city, state
Exhibition
November 4, 2009*; 7:00 pm		Augustana	W 92–76	–	McKale Center (13,202); Tucson, Arizona
November 10, 2009*; 7:00 pm		Western New Mexico	W 96–55	–	McKale Center (13,348); Tucson, Arizona
Non-conference regular season
November 15, 2009*; 3:00 pm, KWBA/FSAZ		Northern Arizona	W 87–70	1–0	McKale Center (13,448); Tucson, Arizona
November 19, 2009*; 8:30 pm, FSAZ		Rice	W 66–49	2–0	McKale Center (13,531); Tucson, Arizona
November 23, 2009*; 10:00 pm, ESPN2		vs. Wisconsin; Maui Invitational first round	L 61–65	2–1	Lahaina Civic Center (2,400); Maui, Hawaii
November 24, 2009*; 2:00 pm, ESPN2		vs. Colorado; Maui Invitational 2nd round consolation	W 91–87 ^{OT}	3–1	Lahaina Civic Center (2,400); Maui, Hawaii
November 25, 2009*; 5:00 pm, ESPNU		vs. No. 24 Vanderbilt; Maui Invitational 5th place game	L 72–84	3–2	Lahaina Civic Center (2,400); Maui, Hawaii
December 2, 2009*; 7:00 pm, KGUN/FSAZ		No. 21 UNLV	L 72–74 ^{2OT}	3–3	McKale Center (13,485); Tucson, Arizona
December 6, 2009*; 5:00 pm, ESPNU		at Oklahoma; Big 12/Pac-10 Hardwood Series	L 62–79	3–4	Lloyd Noble Center (7,763); Norman, Oklahoma
December 9, 2009*; 9:00 pm, KWBA/FSAZ		Louisiana Tech	W 83–67	4–4	McKale Center (13,270); Tucson, Arizona
December 12, 2009*; 8:00 pm, The Mtn.		at San Diego State	L 46–63	4–5	Viejas Arena (12,414); San Diego, California
December 21, 2009*; 7:00 pm, FCS		Lipscomb	W 83–82 ^{OT}	5–5	McKale Center (12,972); Tucson, Arizona
December 23, 2009*; 8:30 pm, FSN		NC State	W 76–74	6–5	McKale Center (12,809); Tucson, Arizona
December 28, 2009*; 7:00 pm, KGUN/FCS		BYU; Fiesta Bowl Basketball Classic	L 69–99	6–6	McKale Center (13,992); Tucson, Arizona
Pac-10 regular season
December 31, 2009; 4:00 pm, FSAZ		at USC	L 50–56	6–7 (0–1)	Galen Center (4,823); Los Angeles, California
January 2, 2010; 11:00 am, CBS		at UCLA	W 77–63	7–7 (1–1)	Pauley Pavilion (8,681); Los Angeles, California
January 8, 2010; 6:30 pm, KGUN/FSAZ		Washington State	L 76–78	7–8 (1–2)	McKale Center (12,758); Tucson, Arizona
January 10, 2010; 3:30 pm, KWBA/FSAZ		No. 22 Washington	W 87–70	8–8 (2–2)	McKale Center (12,899); Tucson, Arizona
January 14, 2010; 4:30 pm		at Oregon State	L 64–67	8–9 (2–3)	Gill Coliseum (7,472); Corvallis, Oregon
January 16, 2010; 2:30 pm, FSN		at Oregon	W 74–60	9–9 (3–3)	McArthur Court (7,641); Eugene, Oregon
January 23, 2010; 7:30 pm, FSAZ		at Arizona State	W 77–58	10–9 (4–3)	Wells Fargo Arena (13,966); Tempe, Arizona
January 28, 2010; 6:00 pm, FCS		Stanford	W 76–68	11–9 (5–3)	McKale Center (14,563); Tucson, Arizona
January 31, 2010; 1:30 pm, FSN		California	W 76–72	12–9 (6–3)	McKale Center (14,629); Tucson, Arizona
February 4, 2010; 8:30 pm, FSN		at Washington	L 75–81	12–10 (6–4)	Bank of America Arena (9,917); Seattle, Washington
February 6, 2010; 6:30 pm, FSAZ		at Washington State	L 60–78	12–11 (6–5)	Beasley Coliseum (8,135); Pullman, Washington
February 11, 2010; 8:30 pm, FSN		Oregon	W 70–57	13–11 (7–5)	McKale Center (14,496); Tucson, Arizona
February 13, 2010; 6:00 pm, KWBA/FCS		Oregon State	L 55–63	13–12 (7–6)	McKale Center (14,566); Tucson, Arizona
February 21, 2010; 3:30 pm, FSN		Arizona State	L 69–73	13–13 (7–7)	McKale Center (14,631); Tucson, Arizona
February 25, 2010; 7:00 pm, ESPN		at California	L 71–95	13–14 (7–8)	Haas Pavilion (10,545); Berkeley, California
February 27, 2010; 5:00 pm		at Stanford	W 71–69	14–14 (8–8)	Maples Pavilion (7,106); Stanford, California
March 4, 2010; 8:30 pm, FSN		UCLA	W 78–73	15–14 (9–8)	McKale Center (14,407); Tucson, Arizona
March 6, 2010; 11:30 am, KWBA/FSAZ		USC	W 86–84 ^{2OT}	16–14 (10–8)	McKale Center (14,591); Tucson, Arizona
Pac-10 tournament
March 11, 2010; 1:00 pm, FSN		vs. UCLA; Quarterfinals	L 69–75	16–15	Staples Center (12,125); Los Angeles, California
*Non-conference game. ^{#}Rankings from AP Poll. (#) Tournament seedings in parentheses. All times are in Mountain Time.

== Awards ==
Derrick Williams

- Pac-10 All-Conference First Team
- Pac-10 Freshman of the Year

Nic Wise

- Pac-10 All-Conference First Team
- Pac-10 Player of the Week – February 1, 2010
