= 2010 Pacific-10 Conference men's basketball tournament =

- Classification: Division I
- Season: 2009–10
- Teams: 9
- Site: Staples Center; Los Angeles, California
- Champions: Washington (2nd title)
- Winning coach: Lorenzo Romar (2nd title)
- MVP: Isaiah Thomas, (Washington)
- Attendance: 15,851
- Television: FSN, CBS

2009–10 Pacific-10 Conference men's basketball standings
	Conf.				Overall
Team	W		L	PCT	W		L	PCT
California	13	–	5	.722	24	–	11	.686
Arizona State	12	–	6	.667	22	–	11	.667
Washington †	11	–	7	.611	26	–	10	.722
Arizona	10	–	8	.556	16	–	15	.516
USC*	8	–	10	.444	16	–	14	.533
Oregon State	8	–	10	.444	14	–	18	.438
UCLA	8	–	10	.444	14	–	18	.438
Stanford	7	–	11	.389	14	–	17	.452
Oregon	7	–	11	.389	16	–	16	.500
Washington State	6	–	12	.333	16	–	15	.516
† Conference tournament winner As of March 25, 2010; Rankings from AP Poll * Ineligible for conference tournament

The 2010 Pacific Life Pacific-10 Conference men's basketball tournament was played with the first round on March 10, 2010 at Staples Center in Los Angeles, California, with quarterfinals on March 11, semifinals on March 12, and the finals on March 13 (3:00 p.m. PT). Washington, the tournament champion, became the NCAA tournament automatic qualifier from the conference.

== Seeds ==
All Pacific-10 schools except USC played in the tournament. USC was banned from post season play as a result of self-imposed sanctions for illegal benefits received during the 2007–2008 season. Teams were seeded by conference record, with a tiebreaker system used to seed teams with identical conference records.

Seed	School	Record: Conference (Overall)	Tiebreaker
1	California	13–5 (21–9)	
2	Arizona State	12–6 (22–9)	
3	Washington	11–7 (21–9)	
4	Arizona	10–8 (16–14)	
5	UCLA	8–10 (13–17)	2-0 vs. Oregon St.
6	Oregon State	8–10 (14–16)	0-2 vs. UCLA
7	Stanford	7–11 (13–17)	2-0 vs. Oregon
8	Oregon	7–11 (15–15)	0-2 vs. Stanford
9	Washington State	6–12 (16–14)	

== 2010 Pac-10 tournament ==
=== Schedule ===
- Wed., Mar. 10: Oregon vs. Washington State, 8 p.m. FSN;
- Thur., Mar. 11: Arizona vs. UCLA, 12 noon FSN; Oregon vs. California, 2:30 p.m. FSN; Stanford vs. Arizona State, 6 p.m. FSN; Washington vs. Oregon State, 8:30 p.m. FSN
- Fri., Mar. 12: Semifinal 1, 6 p.m. FSN; Semifinal 2, 8:30 p.m. FSN
- Sat., Mar. 13 Championship Game, 3:15 p.m. CBS (Pacific time)

First Round; March 10
8	Oregon	82
9	Washington State	80

Quarterfinals; March 11
1	California	90
8	Oregon	74
4	Arizona	69
5	UCLA	75
2	Arizona State	61
7	Stanford	70
3	Washington	59
6	Oregon State	52

Semifinals; March 12
1	California	85
5	UCLA	72
7	Stanford	64
3	Washington	79

Final; March 13
1	California	75
3	Washington	79

== Tournament notes ==
- Officials: Dick Cartmell, Scott Thornley, Michael Reed
- The championship game attendance (15,851) declined for the second consecutive year and dropped by over 1,000 from 2009.
- Cal earned its first regular season conference title in a half century and was the top seed in the conference tournament for the first time.
- Jerome Randle became Cal's leading scorer during the tournament when Cal defeated UCLA 85–72 in the semifinals, surpassing Sean Lampley with 1,790 career points and was perfect at the free-throw line (16–16), a new record. The old mark was made by Sean Elliott of Arizona, who was 96.3% (26–27) in 1989.
- The Golden Bears shot 87.0% free throws (20–23) at the championship game and set the Pac-10 tournament team record of 85.2% (52–61) for the three games, breaking Arizona's 1989 mark of 82.6% (57–69).
- This was the second meeting between Cal and Washington in the Pac-10 tournament, Cal won 84–81 in the play-in round in 2008.
- Cal and Washington both were invited to participate in the NCAA Tournament, with Cal getting an at-large bid.
- Arizona State was invited to the National Invitation Tournament (NIT)
- Oregon State was invited to the College Basketball Invitational (CBI)

== All-Tournament Team ==
- Jamal Boykin, F, California
- Quincy Pondexter, F, Washington
- Jerome Randle, G, California
- Theo Robertson, F, California
- Michael Roll, G, UCLA

== Most Outstanding Player ==
- Isaiah Thomas, G, Washington

== 2010 Hall of Honor inductees ==
Pac-10 men’s basketball Pac-10 Hall of Honor luncheon was held on Saturday, March 13, 2010 to honor an individual from each of the Pac-10 member schools.

- Mike Bibby (Arizona)
- Jeremy Veal (Arizona State)
- Earl Robinson (California)
- Kenya Wilkins (Oregon)
- Dave Gambee (Oregon State)
- Reggie Miller (UCLA)
- John Arrillaga (Stanford)
- John Block (USC)
- Eldridge Recasner (Washington)
- Paul Lindemann (Washington State)

== See also ==
- 2008–09 Pacific-10 Conference men's basketball standings
