= 2009–10 Oregon Ducks men's basketball team =

American college basketball season

2009–10 Oregon Ducks men's basketball

BTI Tip-Off tournament champions
- Conference: Pacific-10 Conference
- Record: 16–16 (7–11 Pac-10)
- Head coach: Ernie Kent
- Assistant coaches: Mike Dunlap; Kenny Payne; Yasir Rosemond
- Home arena: McArthur Court

2009–10 Pacific-10 Conference men's basketball standings
	Conf.				Overall
Team	W		L	PCT	W		L	PCT
California	13	–	5	.722	24	–	11	.686
Arizona State	12	–	6	.667	22	–	11	.667
Washington †	11	–	7	.611	26	–	10	.722
Arizona	10	–	8	.556	16	–	15	.516
USC*	8	–	10	.444	16	–	14	.533
Oregon State	8	–	10	.444	14	–	18	.438
UCLA	8	–	10	.444	14	–	18	.438
Stanford	7	–	11	.389	14	–	17	.452
Oregon	7	–	11	.389	16	–	16	.500
Washington State	6	–	12	.333	16	–	15	.516
† Conference tournament winner As of March 25, 2010; Rankings from AP Poll * Ineligible for conference tournament

The 2009–10 Oregon Ducks men's basketball team represented the University of Oregon in the 2009–10 college basketball season. This was head coach Ernie Kent's 13th and final season at Oregon. The Ducks played their home games at McArthur Court and were members of the Pacific-10 Conference. They finished the season 16–16, 7–11 in Pac-10 play and lost in the quarterfinals of the 2010 Pacific-10 Conference men's basketball tournament. They were not invited to a post season tournament and Ernie Kent was fired at the end of the season, leading to an extensive coaching search in the subsequent offseason.

== Pre-season ==
In the Pac-10 preseason poll, released October 29 in Los Angeles, California during the Pac-10 media days Oregon was selected to finish 6th in the conference.

== Team ==
=== Roster ===
#	Name	Height	Weight (lbs.)	Position	Class	Hometown	Previous Team(s)
1	Nicholas Fearn	6'1"	190	G	So.	Seattle, WA, U.S.	Seattle Prep
2	Garrett Sim	6'1"	180	G	So.	Portland, OR, U.S.	Sunset HS
11	Malcolm Armstead	6'0"	204	G	So.	Florence, AL, U.S.	Florence HS; Chipola CC
12	Tajuan Porter	5'7"	155	G	Sr.	Detroit, MI, U.S.	Renaissance HS
14	Matthew Humphrey	6'5"	185	G	So.	Chicago, IL, U.S.	Hales Franciscan HS
15	John Elorriaga	6'2"	183	G	So.	Portland, OR, U.S.	Jesuit HS
21	Jamil Wilson	6'7"	209	F	Fr.	Racine, WI, U.S.	Horlick HS
22	Drew Wiley	6'7"	215	F	So.	McKenzie River, OR, U.S.	Thurston HS
23	Jeremy Jacob	6'8"	225	F	So.	Baton Rouge, LA, U.S.	Hargrave Military Academy; Chipola CC
24	LeKendric Longmire	6'5"	200	G	Jr.	Pascagoula, MS, U.S.	Pscagoula HS
25	E. J. Singler	6'6"	210	F	Fr.	Medford, OR, U.S.	South Medford HS
32	Teondre Williams	6'4"	199	G	So.	Ellenwood, GA, U.S.	Meadowcreek HS
33	Michael Dunigan	6'10"	242	C	So.	Chicago, IL, U.S.	Farragut Academy
34	Joevan Catron	6'6"	237	F	Sr.	Phoenix, IL, U.S.	Thornton Township HS
42	Josh Crittle	6'8"	250	F	So.	Bellwood, IL, U.S.	Hales Franciscan HS

=== Coaching staff ===
Name	Position	Year at Oregon	Alma Mater (Year)
Ernie Kent	Head coach	13th	Oregon (1977)
Kenny Payne	Associate head coach	6th	Louisville (2003)
Mike Dunlap	Assistant coach	1st	Loyola Marymount (1980)
Yasir Rosemond	Assistant coach	3rd	Oregon (2003)
Josh Jamieson	Director of Basketball Operations	3rd	Southern Oregon (2000)

== Schedule and results ==
Date time, TV	Rank^{#}	Opponent^{#}	Result	Record	Site (attendance) city, state
Regular season
Fri, Nov 13*; 7:00pm		Winston-Salem State; BTI Tip-Off Tournament	W 94–43	1–0	McArthur Court (6,872); Eugene, OR
Sat, Nov 14*; 2:00pm		UC Davis; BTI Tip-Off Tournament	W 95–64	2–0	McArthur Court (6,748); Eugene, OR
Sun, Nov 15*; 3:30pm, CSNNW		Colorado State; BTI Tip-Off Tournament	W 68–53	3–0	McArthur Court (6,769); Eugene, OR
Sat, Nov 21*; 7:00pm		at Portland	L 81–88	3–1	Chiles Center (3,386); Portland, OR
Mon, Nov 23*; 7:00pm		Montana	L 55–68	3–2	McArthur Court (7,095); Eugene, OR
Sat, Nov 28*; 7:00pm, CSNNW		Montana State	W 89–66	4–2	McArthur Court (6,265); Eugene, OR
Sat, Dec 5*; 2:00pm, ESPNU		at Missouri; Big 12/Pac-10 Hardwood Series	L 69–106	4–3	Mizzou Arena (9,940); Columbia, MO
Sat, Dec 12*; 1:00pm		Saint Mary's	L 76–81	4–4	McArthur Court (6,487); Eugene, OR
Wed, Dec 16*; 7:00pm		Mississippi Valley State	W 79–51	5–4	McArthur Court (5,713); Eugene, OR
Sat, Dec 19*; 7:30pm, CSNNW		Oakland	W 72–60	6–4	McArthur Court (6,121); Eugene, OR
Tue, Dec 22*; 7:00pm		Idaho State	W 77–71	7–4	McArthur Court (6,034); Eugene, OR
Mon, Dec 28*; 7:00pm		Arkansas–Pine Bluff	W 73–53	8–4	McArthur Court (6,374); Eugene, OR
Thu, Dec 31; 3:30pm, CSNNW		at Washington State	W 91–89 ^{2OT}	9–4 (1–0)	Beasley Coliseum (5,810); Pullman, WA
Sat, Jan 2; 2:00pm, CSNNW		at No. 17 Washington	W 90–79	10–4 (2–0)	Bank of America Arena (10,000); Seattle, WA
Sun, Jan 10; 7:30pm, FSN		Oregon State; Civil War	L 57–64	10–5 (2–1)	McArthur Court (8,217); Eugene, OR
Thu, Jan 14; 5:30pm, CSNNW		Arizona State	L 57–76	10–6 (2–2)	McArthur Court (7,117); Eugene, OR
Sat, Jan 16; 1:30pm, FSN		Arizona	L 60–74	10–7 (2–3)	McArthur Court (7,641); Eugene, OR
Thu, Jan 21; 7:30pm, CSNBA		at California	L 57–89	10–8 (2–4)	Haas Pavilion (8,535); Berkeley, CA
Sat, Jan 23; 5:00pm		at Stanford	L 69–84	10–9 (2–5)	Maples Pavilion (6,654); Stanford, CA
Thu, Jan 28; 7:30pm, FSN		UCLA	W 71–66 ^{OT}	11–9 (3–5)	McArthur Court (7,528); Eugene, OR
Sat, Jan 30; 3:00pm, CSNNW		USC	W 67–57	12–9 (4–5)	McArthur Court (7,774); Eugene, OR
Sat, Feb 6; 3:00pm, FSNW		at Oregon State; Civil War	L 42–62	12–10 (4–6)	Gill Coliseum (9,124); Corvallis, OR
Thu, Feb 11; 7:30pm, FSN		at Arizona	L 57–70	12–11 (4–7)	McKale Center (14,496); Tucson, AZ
Sat, Feb 13; 3:00pm, CSNNW		at Arizona State	L 51–61	12–12 (4–8)	Wells Fargo Arena (7,618); Tempe, AZ
Thu, Feb 18; 7:00pm		Stanford	L 65–72	12–13 (4–9)	McArthur Court (7,703); Eugene, OR
Sat, Feb 20; 3:00pm, CSNNW		California	L 49–64	12–14 (4–10)	McArthur Court (8,099); Eugene, OR
Thu, Feb 25; 7:30pm		at USC	W 54–44	13–14 (5–10)	Galen Center ( 6,152); Los Angeles, CA
Sat, Feb 27; 2:00pm, CSNNW		at UCLA	W 70–68	14–14 (6–10)	Pauley Pavilion (9,073); Los Angeles, CA
Thu, Mar 4; 7:00pm		Washington	L 72–86	14–15 (6–11)	McArthur Court (8,004); Eugene, OR
Sat, Mar 6; 5:00pm		Washington State	W 74–66	15–15 (7–11)	McArthur Court (8,761); Eugene, OR
Pac-10 tournament
Wed, Mar 10; 8:00pm, FSN	(8)	vs. (9) Washington State; Pac-10 First Round	W 82–80 ^{OT}	16–15	Staples Center (6,090); Los Angeles, CA
Thu, Mar 11; 2:30 pm, FSN	(8)	vs. (1) California; Pac-10 Quarterfinals	L 74–90	16–16	Staples Center (12,125); Los Angeles, CA
*Non-conference game. ^{#}Rankings from AP Poll. (#) Tournament seedings in parentheses. All times are in Pacific Time. Source
