= 2009–10 Washington State Cougars men's basketball team =

American college basketball season

2009–10 Washington State Cougars men's basketball

2009 Great Alaska Shootout Champions
- Conference: Pacific-10 Conference
- Record: 16–15 (6–12 Pac-10)
- Head coach: Ken Bone
- Assistant coaches: Curtis Allen; Jeff Hironaka; Ben Johnson
- Home arena: Beasley Coliseum

2009–10 Pacific-10 Conference men's basketball standings
| | Conf. | | | | Overall |
| Team | W | | L | PCT | W | | L | PCT |
|---|---|---|---|---|---|---|---|---|
| California | 13 | – | 5 | .722 | 24 | – | 11 | .686 |
| Arizona State | 12 | – | 6 | .667 | 22 | – | 11 | .667 |
| Washington † | 11 | – | 7 | .611 | 26 | – | 10 | .722 |
| Arizona | 10 | – | 8 | .556 | 16 | – | 15 | .516 |
| USC* | 8 | – | 10 | .444 | 16 | – | 14 | .533 |
| Oregon State | 8 | – | 10 | .444 | 14 | – | 18 | .438 |
| UCLA | 8 | – | 10 | .444 | 14 | – | 18 | .438 |
| Stanford | 7 | – | 11 | .389 | 14 | – | 17 | .452 |
| Oregon | 7 | – | 11 | .389 | 16 | – | 16 | .500 |
| Washington State | 6 | – | 12 | .333 | 16 | – | 15 | .516 |
† Conference tournament winner As of March 25, 2010; Rankings from AP Poll * Ineligible for conference tournament

The 2009–10 Washington State Cougars men's basketball team represented Washington State University during the 2009-10 NCAA Division I men's basketball season. The team played its home games on Jack Friel Court at Beasley Coliseum in Pullman, Washington and are members of the Pacific-10 Conference. They finished the season 16–15, 6–12 in Pac-10 play and lost in the first round of the 2010 Pacific-10 Conference men's basketball tournament. They were not invited to a post season tournament.

== Roster ==
| Name | Number | Position | Height | Weight | Year | Hometown |
|---|---|---|---|---|---|---|
| John Allen | 20 | Guard | 6–0 | 188 | RS Freshman | Brier, Washington |
| Steven Bjornstad | 13 | Center | 6–10 | 217 | Freshman | Vancouver, Washington |
| Austin Bragg | 44 | Forward | 6–8 | 182 | Freshman | Longview, Washington |
| Anthony Brown | 2 | Guard | 6–4 | 206 | Freshman | Spokane, Washington |
| Marcus Capers | 0 | Guard | 6–4 | 180 | Sophomore | Winter Haven, Florida |
| DeAngelo Casto | 23 | Forward | 6–8 | 231 | Sophomore | Spokane, Washington |
| Charlie Enquist | 40 | Forward | 6–10 | 222 | RS Sophomore | Edmonds, Washington |
| Michael Harthun | 30 | Guard | 6–3 | 181 | Sophomore | Medford, Oregon |
| Nikola Koprivica | 4 | Guard | 6–6 | 221 | Senior | Belgrade, Serbia |
| Abe Lodwick | 31 | Guard | 6–7 | 200 | RS Sophomore | Bend, Oregon |
| Ben Loewen | 22 | Guard | 6–0 | 172 | RS Sophomore | Spokane, Washington |
| Reggie Moore | 3 | Guard | 6–1 | 178 | Freshman | Seattle, Washington |
| Brock Motum | 12 | Forward | 6–9 | 205 | Freshman | Brisbane, Australia |
| Xavier Thames | 11 | Guard | 6–3 | 186 | Freshman | Sacramento, California |
| Klay Thompson | 1 | Guard | 6–6 | 200 | Sophomore | Ladera Ranch, California |
| James Watson | 14 | Forward | 6–7 | 213 | Sophomore | Atoka, Oklahoma |

== Schedule ==
| Date time, TV | Rank^{#} | Opponent^{#} | Result | Record | Site (attendance) city, state |
Exhibition
| 11/09/2009*; 7:00 pm | | Lewis-Clark State | W 73–51 | -- | Beasley Coliseum (3,476); Pullman, WA |
Regular Season
| 11/13/2009*; 7:00 pm | | Mississippi Valley State | W 94–66 | 1–0 | Beasley Coliseum (9,188); Pullman, WA |
| 11/16/2009*; 7:00 pm, FSNNW | | Eastern Washington | W 67–61 | 2–0 | Beasley Coliseum (5,767); Pullman, WA |
| 11/19/2009*; 7:00 pm | | IPFW | W 89–70 | 3–0 | Beasley Coliseum (5,399); Pullman, WA |
| 11/25/2009*; 8:30 pm, FSNNW | | at Alaska Anchorage; Great Alaska Shootout 1st Round | W 87–68 | 4–0 | Sullivan Arena (5,849); Anchorage, AK |
| 11/27/2009*; 6:00 pm, FSNNW | | vs. Nicholls State; Great Alaska Shootout Semi-finals | W 78–69 | 5–0 | Sullivan Arena (5,657); Anchorage, AK |
| 11/28/2009*; 8:00 pm, FSNNW | | vs. San Diego; Great Alaska Shootout Championship | W 93–56 | 6–0 | Sullivan Arena (5,821); Anchorage, AK |
| 12/02/2009*; 6:00 pm, FSNNW | | at No. 16 Gonzaga | L 69–74 | 6–1 | McCarthey Athletic Center (6,000); Spokane, WA |
| 12/05/2009*; 6:00 pm, ESPNU | | at Kansas State; Big 12/Pac-10 Hardwood Series | L 69–86 | 6–2 | Bramlage Coliseum (12,528); Manhattan, KS |
| 12/09/2009*; 8:00 pm, FSNNW | | Idaho; Battle of the Palouse | W 76–64 | 7–2 | Beasley Coliseum (7,285); Pullman, WA |
| 12/12/2009*; 1:00 pm | | vs. Air Force | W 75–68 | 8–2 | Spokane Arena (7,024); Spokane, WA |
| 12/19/2009*; 4:30 pm, FSNNW | | vs. Portland State | W 93–69 | 9–2 | Toyota Center (6,286); Kennewick, WA |
| 12/22/2009*; 7:00 pm, CBSCS | | vs. Louisiana State; Cougar Hardwood Classic | W 72–70 ^{OT} | 10–2 | KeyArena (15,341); Seattle, WA |
| 12/31/2009; 3:30 pm | | Oregon | L 89–91 ^{2OT} | 10–3 (0–1) | Beasley Coliseum (5,810); Pullman, WA |
| 01/02/2010; 4:00 pm, FSNNW | | Oregon State | W 65–60 | 11–3 (1–1) | Beasley Coliseum (5,967); Pullman, WA |
| 01/08/2010; 5:30 pm, FSNNW | | at Arizona | W 78–76 | 12–3 (2–1) | McKale Center (12,758); Tucson, AZ |
| 01/10/2010; 11:30 am, FSN | | at Arizona State | L 46–71 | 12–4 (2–2) | Wells Fargo Arena (6,433); Tempe, AZ |
| 01/14/2010; 7:00 pm | | California | L 88–93 | 12–5 (2–3) | Beasley Coliseum (8,277); Pullman, WA |
| 01/16/2010; 2:00 pm | | Stanford | W 77–73 | 13–5 (3–3) | Beasley Coliseum (8,148); Pullman, WA |
| 01/21/2010; 7:30 pm | | at USC | W 67–60 | 14–5 (4–3) | Galen Center (4,422); Los Angeles, CA |
| 01/23/2010; 1:00 pm, FSN | | at UCLA | L 62–74 | 14–6 (4–4) | Pauley Pavilion (8,349); Los Angeles, CA |
| 01/30/2010; 12:30 pm, FSN | | at Washington | L 64–92 | 14–7 (4–5) | Bank of America Arena (10,000); Seattle, WA |
| 02/04/2010; 7:00 pm | | Arizona State | L 70–81 | 14–8 (4–6) | Beasley Coliseum (7,360); Pullman, WA |
| 02/06/2010; 5:30 pm, FSNNW | | Arizona | W 78–60 | 15–8 (5–6) | Beasley Coliseum (8,135); Pullman, WA |
| 02/11/2010; 7:00 pm | | at Stanford | L 58–60 | 15–9 (5–7) | Maples Pavilion (6,547); Stanford, CA |
| 02/13/2010; 1:00 pm, FSN | | at California | L 70–86 | 15–10 (5–8) | Haas Pavilion (9,536); Berkeley, CA |
| 02/18/2010; 5:30 pm, FSNNW | | UCLA | L 51–71 | 15–11 (5–9) | Beasley Coliseum (6,566); Pullman, WA |
| 02/20/2010; 2:00 pm | | USC | W 51–47 | 16–11 (6–9) | Beasley Coliseum (6,967); Pullman, WA |
| 02/27/2010; 7:00 pm, FSNNW | | Washington | L 52–59 | 16–12 (6–10) | Beasley Coliseum (11,671); Pullman, WA |
| 03/04/2011; 7:00 pm | | at Oregon State | L 55–59 | 16–13 (6–11) | Gill Coliseum (6,507); Corvallis, OR |
| 03/06/2010; 5:00 pm, CSNNW | | at Oregon | L 66–74 | 16–14 (6–12) | McArthur Court (8,761); Eugene, OR |
Pacific-10 Conference tournament
| 03/10/2010; 8:00 pm, FSN | | vs. Oregon; First round | L 80–82 ^{OT} | 16–15 | Staples Center (6,090); Los Angeles, CA |
*Non-conference game. ^{#}Rankings from Coaches' Poll. (#) Tournament seedings in parentheses. All times are in Pacific Time.
