= 2009–10 California Golden Bears men's basketball team =

American college basketball season

2009–10 California Golden Bears men's basketball

Pac-10 regular season champions

NCAA tournament, Round of 32
- Conference: Pacific-10 Conference
- Record: 24–11 (13–5 Pac-10)
- Head coach: Mike Montgomery
- Assistant coaches: Jay John; Travis DeCuire; Gregg Gottlieb
- Home arena: Haas Pavilion

2009–10 Pacific-10 Conference men's basketball standings
	Conf.				Overall
Team	W		L	PCT	W		L	PCT
California	13	–	5	.722	24	–	11	.686
Arizona State	12	–	6	.667	22	–	11	.667
Washington †	11	–	7	.611	26	–	10	.722
Arizona	10	–	8	.556	16	–	15	.516
USC*	8	–	10	.444	16	–	14	.533
Oregon State	8	–	10	.444	14	–	18	.438
UCLA	8	–	10	.444	14	–	18	.438
Stanford	7	–	11	.389	14	–	17	.452
Oregon	7	–	11	.389	16	–	16	.500
Washington State	6	–	12	.333	16	–	15	.516
† Conference tournament winner As of March 25, 2010; Rankings from AP Poll * Ineligible for conference tournament

The 2009–10 California Golden Bears men's basketball team represented the University of California, Berkeley in the 2009–10 NCAA Division I men's basketball season. This was head coach Mike Montgomery's second season at California. The Golden Bears played their home games at Haas Pavilion and participated in the Pacific-10 Conference. They finished the season 24–11, 13–5 in Pac-10 play to win the regular season conference championship, their first regular season title since the 1959–60 season. They lost to Washington in the finals of the Pac-10 tournament. They received an at–large bid to the 2010 NCAA Division I men's basketball tournament, earning an 8 seed in the South Region. They defeated 9 seed Louisville in the first round before falling to 1 seed and AP #3 Duke in the second round. The Blue Devils went on to claim their fourth national title.

== Pre-season ==
In the Pac-10 preseason poll, released on October 29 in Los Angeles, California during the Pac-10 media days, California was selected to finish 1st in the conference.

== Roster ==
#	Name	Height	Weight (lbs.)	Position	Class	Hometown	Previous team(s)
0	Nigel Carter	6'4"	205	G	So.	Los Angeles, CA, U.S.	Dorsey HS
1	D. J. Seeley	6'4"	195	G	So.	Stockton, CA, U.S.	Modesto Christian HS
2	Jorge Gutierrez	6'3"	195	G	So.	Chihuahua, Mexico	Findlay Prep
3	Jerome Randle	5'10"	172	G	Sr.	Chicago, IL, U.S.	Hales Franciscan HS
10	Jamal Boykin	6'8"	240	F	Sr.	Los Angeles, CA, U.S.	Fairfax High School HS; Duke
12	Brandon Smith	5'11"	185	G	Fr.	San Ramon, CA, U.S.	De La Salle HS
13	Nikola Knezevic	6'3"	190	G	Sr.	Belgrade, Serbia	Fifth Economy School
14	Max Zhang	7'3"	240	C	So.	Yantai, Shandong China	No. 4 Yantai HS
15	Bak Bak	6'9"	210	F	Fr.	Sun Valley, CA, U.S.	Village Christian HS
21	Omondi Amoke	6'7"	225	F	So.	Oxnard, CA, U.S.	Oxnard
23	Patrick Christopher	6'5"	220	G	Sr.	Compton, CA, U.S.	Dominguez HS
24	Theo Robertson	6'6"	230	F	Sr.	Pittsburg, CA, U.S.	De La Salle HS
32	Robert Thurman	6'10"	245	F	So.	North Edwards, CA, U.S.	Desert HS; Norwich
43	Harper Kamp	6'8"	250	F	Jr.	Mesa, AZ, U.S.	Mountain View HS
45	Markhuri Sanders-Frison	6'7"	275	C	Jr.	Portland, OR, U.S.	Jefferson HS; South Plains

=== Coaching staff ===
Name	Position	Year at Cal	Alma mater (year)
Mike Montgomery	Head coach	2nd	Colorado State (1976)
Jay John	Assistant coach	2nd	Arizona (1981)
Travis DeCuire	Assistant coach	2nd	Montana (1994)
Gregg Gottlieb	Assistant coach	3rd	UCLA (1995)
John Montgomery	Director of basketball operations	2nd	Loyola Marymount (2007)

== Schedule and results ==
- All times are Pacific

Date time, TV	Rank^{#}	Opponent^{#}	Result	Record	Site (attendance) city, state
Exhibition
11/5/2009*; 7:30pm	No. 13	Chico State	W 84–47		Haas Pavilion (7,453); Berkeley, CA
Regular season
11/9/2009*; 8:00pm, ESPNU	No. 13	Murray State; Coaches Vs. Cancer Classic	W 75–70	1–0	Haas Pavilion (7,603); Berkeley, CA
11/11/2009*; 8:00pm, ESPNU	No. 13	Detroit; Coaches Vs. Cancer Classic	W 95–61	2–0	Haas Pavilion (7,541); Berkeley, CA
11/19/2009*; 4:00pm, ESPN2	No. 13	vs. Syracuse; Coaches Vs. Cancer Classic	L 73–95	2–1	Madison Square Garden (NA); New York, NY
11/20/2009*; 2:00pm, ESPN2	No. 13	vs. No. 15 Ohio State; Coaches Vs. Cancer Classic	L 70–76	2–2	Madison Square Garden (15,552); New York, NY
11/24/2009*; 7:30pm		Jacksonville	W 79–47	3–2	Haas Pavilion (9,672); Berkeley, CA
11/29/2009*; 2:00pm, CSNC		Princeton	W 81–60	4–2	Haas Pavilion (8,919); Berkeley, CA
12/2/2009*; 6:00pm, CBSCS		at New Mexico	L 78–86	4–3	The Pit (13,549); Albuquerque, NM
12/5/2009*; 8:00pm, ESPNU		Iowa State; Big 12/Pac-10 Hardwood Series	W 82–63	5–3	Haas Pavilion (9,845); Berkeley, CA
12/9/2009*; 7:00pm, Big West TV		at Pacific	W 79–53	6–3	Stockton Arena (8,704); Stockton, CA
12/22/2009*; 6:00pm, ESPN2		at No. 1 Kansas	L 69–84	6–4	Allen Fieldhouse (16,300); Lawrence, KS
12/28/2009*; 7:30pm		Utah Valley; Colliers International Golden Bear Classic	W 85–51	7–4	Haas Pavilion (8,450); Berkeley, CA
12/29/2009; 7:30pm, CSNC		UC Santa Barbara; Colliers International Golden Bear Classic	W 87–66	8–4	Haas Pavilion (9,052); Berkeley, CA
1/2/2010; 4:00pm, CSNC		Stanford	W 92–66	9–4 (1–0)	Haas Pavilion (10,758); Berkeley, CA
1/6/2010; 7:30pm, FSN/CSNBA		UCLA	L 75–76 ^{OT}	9–5 (1–1)	Haas Pavilion (10,005); Berkeley, CA
1/9/2010; 7:30pm, FSN/CSNBA		USC	W 67–59	10–5 (2–1)	Haas Pavilion (9,930); Berkeley, CA
1/14/2010; 7:00pm		at Washington State	W 93–88	11–5 (3–1)	Beasley Coliseum (8,277); Pullman, WA
1/16/2010; 11:30am, CSNBA		at Washington	L 69–84	11–6 (3–2)	Bank of America Arena (9,897); Seattle, WA
1/21/2010; 7:30pm, CSNBA		Oregon	W 89–57	12–6 (4–2)	Haas Pavilion (8,535); Berkeley, CA
1/23/2010; 11:00am, CBS		Oregon State	W 65–61	13–6 (5–2)	Haas Pavilion (8,666); Berkeley, CA
1/26/2010; 5:30pm, CSNC		at Arizona State	W 78–70	14–6 (6–2)	Wells Fargo Arena (8,416); Tempe, AZ
1/31/2010; 12:30pm, FSN/CSNBA		at Arizona	L 72–76	14–7 (6–3)	McKale Center (14,629); Tucson, AZ
2/4/2010; 7:30pm		at USC	L 63–66	14–8 (6–4)	Galen Center (7,412); Los Angeles, CA
2/6/2010; 1:00pm, CBS		at UCLA	W 72–58	15–8 (7–4)	Pauley Pavilion (10,450); Los Angeles, CA
2/11/2010; 6:00pm, ESPN2		Washington	W 93–81	16–8 (8–4)	Haas Pavilion (9,839); Berkeley, CA
2/13/2010; 1:00pm, FSN/CSNBA		Washington State	W 86–70	17–8 (9–4)	Haas Pavilion (9,536); Berkeley, CA
2/18/2010; 7:30pm, FSN/CSNBA		at Oregon State	L 64–80	17–9 (9–5)	Gill Coliseum (6,609); Corvallis, OR
2/20/2010; 3:00pm, CSNC		at Oregon	W 64–49	18–9 (10–5)	McArthur Court (8,099); Eugene, OR
2/25/2010; 6:00pm, ESPN2		Arizona	W 95–71	19–9 (11–5)	Haas Pavilion ( 10,545); Berkeley, CA
2/27/2010; 12:00pm		Arizona State	W 62–46	20–9 (12–5)	Haas Pavilion (11,877); Berkeley, CA
3/6/2010; 3:00pm		at Stanford	W 71–61	21–9 (13–5)	Maples Pavilion (7,329); Stanford, CA
2010 Pacific-10 Conference men's basketball tournament
3/11/2010; 2:30pm, FSN	(1)	vs. (8) Oregon; Quarterfinals	W 90–74	22–9	Staples Center (12,125); Los Angeles, CA
3/12/2010; 6:00pm, FSN	(1)	vs. (5) UCLA; Semifinals	W 85–72	23–9	Staples Center (NA); Los Angeles, CA
3/13/2010; 3:15pm, CBS	(1)	vs. (3) Washington; Finals	L 75–79	23–10	Staples Center (15,851); Los Angeles, CA
NCAA tournament
March 19; 6:45pm, CBS	(8)	vs. (9) Louisville; First Round	W 77–62	24–10	Jacksonville Veterans Memorial Arena (12,251); Jacksonville, FL
March 21; 2:15 pm, CBS	(8)	vs. (1) No. 3 Duke; Second Round	L 53–68	24–11	Jacksonville Veterans Memorial Arena (12,547); Jacksonville, FL
*Non-conference game. ^{#}Rankings from AP Poll. (#) Tournament seedings in parentheses.

== Notes ==
- Point guard Jerome Randle was named the 2010 Pac-10 Player of the Year. He also became Cal's leading scorer on March 13, 2010, when Cal defeated UCLA 85–72 in the semifinals of the Pac-10 tournament, surpassing Sean Lampley with 1,790 career points.
- March 17, 2010 – Forward Omondi Amoke was suspended for violating team rules going into the NCAA tournament, and did not play in the Bears' first round match against Louisville.

== Rankings ==
Ranking movements Legend: ██ Increase in ranking ██ Decrease in ranking — = Not ranked RV = Received votes
	Week																			
Poll	Pre	1	2	3	4	5	6	7	8	9	10	11	12	13	14	15	16	17	18	Final
AP	13	13	RV	RV	RV	—	RV	RV	RV	—	—	RV	—	—	—	—	—	—	RV	Not released
Coaches	12	12	23	25	RV	—	RV	RV	RV	—	—	RV	RV	—	RV	—	RV	RV	RV	

*AP does not release post-NCAA Tournament rankings.
^Coaches did not release a Week 2 poll.
