= 2009–10 Stanford Cardinal men's basketball team =

American college basketball season

2009–2010 Stanford Cardinal men's basketball
- Conference: Pac-10 Conference
- Record: 14–18 (7–11 Pac-10)
- Head coach: Johnny Dawkins (2nd season)
- Assistant coaches: Dick Davey; Rodney Tention; Mike Schrage
- Home arena: Maples Pavilion

2009–10 Pacific-10 Conference men's basketball standings
	Conf.				Overall
Team	W		L	PCT	W		L	PCT
California	13	–	5	.722	24	–	11	.686
Arizona State	12	–	6	.667	22	–	11	.667
Washington †	11	–	7	.611	26	–	10	.722
Arizona	10	–	8	.556	16	–	15	.516
USC*	8	–	10	.444	16	–	14	.533
Oregon State	8	–	10	.444	14	–	18	.438
UCLA	8	–	10	.444	14	–	18	.438
Stanford	7	–	11	.389	14	–	17	.452
Oregon	7	–	11	.389	16	–	16	.500
Washington State	6	–	12	.333	16	–	15	.516
† Conference tournament winner As of March 25, 2010; Rankings from AP Poll * Ineligible for conference tournament

The 2009–10 Stanford Cardinal men's basketball team represented Stanford University during the 2009–10 NCAA Division I men's basketball season. The Cardinal were led by second year head coach Johnny Dawkins, and played their home games at Maples Pavilion as a member of the Pacific-10 Conference.

== Previous season ==
The Cardinal started the year off strong starting 10–0 in non-conference play but couldn't keep up in conference play ending up under .500. In the Pac-10 tournament they received a #9 seed and would win in the first round against Oregon State In the second round the Cardinal faced #1 seed Washington but lost 85–73. Stanford received a bid to the College Basketball Invitational as a #1 seed in the Midwest and a first round opponent of Boise State. After the win against Boise State, Stanford hit the road and traveled to Wichita, Kansas to face the Shockers and would come out with a 70–56 victory. With the Semifinals being reseeded, the Cardinal would face Pac-10 foe, for the fourth time in the season, Oregon State. Stanford took Oregon State to overtime, but came up short losing by three, going 1–3 against the Beavers in the season and finishing 20–14 overall and 6–12 in conference play.

== Offseason ==
=== Departures ===
Stanford Departures
Name	Number	Pos.	Height	Weight	Year	Hometown	Reason for Departure
Kenny Brown	22	G	6'1"	190	RS-Senior	Southlake, TX	Graduated
Anthony Goods	4	G	6'3"	195	Senior	Corona, CA	Graduated
Lawrence Hill	15	F	6'8"	205	Senior	Glendale, AZ	Graduated
Mitch Johnson	1	G	6'1"	185	Senior	Seattle, WA	Graduated
Will Paul	34	C	6'9"	220	Junior	Corpus Christi, TX	Transferred to Arkansas Tech

=== Incoming ===
College recruiting information
Name	Hometown	School	Height	Weight	Commit date
Gabriel Harris; G	Birmingham, AL	Altamont School	6 ft 2 in (1.88 m)	185 lb (84 kg)	
Gabriel Harris; G	Recruit ratings: Rivals: ESPN: (89)				
Andy Brown; F	Santa Ana, CA	Mater Dei High School	6 ft 8 in (2.03 m)	210 lb (95 kg)	Nov 6, 2008
Andy Brown; F	Recruit ratings: Rivals: ESPN: (87)				
Overall recruit ranking:
Note: In many cases, Scout, Rivals, 247Sports, On3, and ESPN may conflict in their listings of height and weight.; In these cases, the average was taken. ESPN grades are on a 100-point scale.; Sources: "Stanford Commit List for 2009". Rivals.; "2009 Team Ranking". Rivals.

=== Transfers In ===
Name	Number	Pos.	Height	Weight	Year	Hometown	Transferred From
Andrew Zimmermann	34	F	6’9”	215	Sophomore	Oostburg, WI	Foothill College

== Roster ==
2009–10 Stanford Cardinal men's basketball team
Players
Coaches

Pos.	#	Name	Height	Weight	Year	Previous school	Hometown
G	2	Landry Fields	6 ft 7 in (2.01 m)	210 lb (95 kg)	Sr	Los Alamitos High School	Los Alamitos, CA
G	3	Chris Ebersole	6 ft 2 in (1.88 m)	180 lb (82 kg)	Sr	French American International School	San Francisco, CA
G	10	Drew Shiller	6 ft 0 in (1.83 m)	180 lb (82 kg)	RS Sr	Burlingame High School; San Francisco	Burlingame, CA
F	11	Andy Brown (redshirt)	6 ft 8 in (2.03 m)	225 lb (102 kg)	Fr	Mater Dei High School	Yorba Linda, CA
G	13	Emmanuel Igbinosa	6 ft 2 in (1.88 m)	185 lb (84 kg)	Sr	Bellaire High School	Houston, TX
C	15	Matei Daian	6 ft 10 in (2.08 m)	240 lb (109 kg)	So	Saint Sava National College	Bucharest, Romania
F	20	Peter Abraham	6 ft 6 in (1.98 m)	200 lb (91 kg)	Fr	Troy High School	Brea, CA
G	22	Jarrett Mann	6 ft 3 in (1.91 m)	185 lb (84 kg)	So	Blair Academy	Middletown, DE
G	23	Gabriel Harris	6 ft 2 in (1.88 m)	185 lb (84 kg)	Fr	Altamont School	Birmingham, AL
F	24	Josh Owens	6 ft 8 in (2.03 m)	215 lb (98 kg)	So	Phillips Exeter Academy	Kennesaw, GA
G	32	Da'veed Dildy	6 ft 5 in (1.96 m)	185 lb (84 kg)	RS Jr	King College Prep	Chicago, IL
F	34	Andrew Zimmerman	6 ft 9 in (2.06 m)	215 lb (98 kg)	RS So	Oostburg High School; Foothill College	Oosburg, WI
F	40	Elloitt Bullock	6 ft 11 in (2.11 m)	220 lb (100 kg)	RS So	Olympus High School	Salt Lake City, UT
F	42	Tavita Pritchard	6 ft 4 in (1.93 m)	210 lb (95 kg)	RS Sr	Clover Park High School	Tacoma, WA
G	45	Jeremy Green	6 ft 4 in (1.93 m)	190 lb (86 kg)	So	Bowie High School	Austin TX
F	50	Jack Trotter	6 ft 9 in (2.06 m)	220 lb (100 kg)	So	Campolindo High School	Maraga, CA

Head coach

- Johnny Dawkins (Duke)

Assistant coach(es)

- Dick Davey (Pacific)
- Rodney Tention (San Francisco)
- Mike Schrage (Indiana)

Legend

- (C) Team captain
- (S) Suspended
- (I) Ineligible
- (W) Walk-on
- Injured
- Current redshirt

Roster
Last update: May 15, 2022

== Schedule and results ==
Date time, TV	Rank^{#}	Opponent^{#}	Result	Record	Site (attendance) city, state
Exhibition
November 7, 2009; 7:00 PM		Sonoma State	W 82–61	–	Maples Pavilion; Stanford, CA
Non-conference regular season
November 13, 2009*; 7:00 PM		at San Diego	L 64–77	0–1	Jenny Craig Pavilion (3,518); San Diego, CA
November 15, 2009*; 7:00 PM		Cal Poly	W 70–53	1–1	Maples Pavilion (6,341); Stanford, CA
November 18, 2009*; 7:00 PM		Oral Roberts; Cancún Challenge campus games	L 81–82	1–2	Maples Pavilion (6,265); Stanford, CA
November 21, 2009*; 1:07 PM		Florida A&M; Cancún Challenge campus games	W 99–69	2–2	Maples Pavilion (5,765); Stanford, CA
November 24, 2009*; 6:00 PM, CBS Sports		vs. Virginia; Cancún Challenge Semifinals	W 57–52	3–2	Moon Palace Resort (200); Cancún, Mexico
November 25, 2009*; 8:30 PM, CBS Sports		vs. No. 5 Kentucky; Cancún Challenge Finals	L 65–73 ^{OT}	3–3	Moon Palace Resort (1,425); Cancún, Mexico
November 29, 2009*; 7:00 PM, CSNBA		Portland State	W 83–64	4–3	Maples Pavilion (6,465); Stanford, CA
December 13, 2009*; 7:06 PM		UC Davis	W 85–69	5–3	Maples Pavilion (6,492); Stanford, CA
December 16, 2009*; 8:00 PM, FSN		Oklahoma State; Big 12/Pac-10 Hardwood Series	L 70–71	5–4	Maples Pavilion (6,427); Stanford, CA
December 19, 2009*; 1:00 PM, BTN		at Northwestern	L 62–70	5–5	Welsh–Ryan Arena (5,098); Evanston, IL
December 22, 2009*; 7:00 PM		at No. 23 Texas Tech	L 87–100	5–6	United Spirit Arena (13,617); Lubbock, TX
December 29, 2009*; 7:00 PM		James Madison	W 80–76	6–6	Maples Pavilion (6,651); Stanford, CA
Pac-10 regular season
January 2, 2010; 4:00 PM, CSNCA		at California	L 66–92	6–7 (0–1)	Haas Pavilion (10,758); Berkeley, CA
January 6, 2010; 7:07 PM		USC	W 54–53	7–7 (1–1)	Maples Pavilion (6,520); Stanford, CA
January 9, 2010; 3:00 PM, CSNBA		UCLA	W 70–59	8–7 (2–1)	Maples Pavilion (6,946); Stanford, CA
January 14, 2010; 7:30 PM, FSN		at Washington	L 61–94	8–8 (2–2)	Bank of America Arena (9,720); Seattle, WA
January 16, 2010; 2:00 PM		at Washington State	L 73–77	8–9 (2–3)	Friel Court (8,148); Pullman, WA
January 21, 2010; 7:00 PM		Oregon State	W 59–35	9–9 (3–3)	Maples Pavilion (6,460); Stanford, CA
January 23, 2010; 5:00 PM		Oregon	W 84–69	10–9 (4–3)	Maples Pavilion (6,654); Stanford, CA
January 28, 2010; 5:00 PM, Fox College Sports		at Arizona	L 68–76	10–10 (4–4)	McKale Center (14,563); Tucson, AZ
January 30, 2010; 1:00 PM		at Arizona State	L 70–88	10–11 (4–5)	Wells Fargo Arena (9,406); Tempe, AZ
February 4, 2010; 7:30 PM, Fox Sports Prime Ticket		at UCLA	L 73–77	10–12 (4–6)	Pauley Pavilion (8,903); Los Angeles, CA
February 10, 2010; 4:30 PM, Fox Sports Prime Ticket		at USC	L 49–54	10–13 (4–7)	Galen Center (6,457); Los Angeles, CA
February 11, 2010; 7:00 PM		Washington State	W 60–58	11–13 (5–7)	Maples Pavilion (6,547); Stanford, CA
February 13, 2010; 5:00 PM, CSNBA		Washington	L 61–78	11–14 (5–8)	Maples Pavilion (6,932); Stanford, CA
February 18, 2010; 7:05 PM		at Oregon	W 72–65	12–14 (6–8)	McArthur Court (7,703); Eugene, OR
February 20, 2010; 12:06 PM, FSN		at Oregon State	W 65–55	13–14 (7–8)	Gill Coliseum (7,061); Corvallis, OR
February 25, 2010; 7:00 PM		Arizona State	L 60–68	13–15 (7–9)	Maples Pavilion (6,661); Stanford, CA
February 27, 2010; 4:00 PM, CSNBA		Arizona	L 69–71	13–16 (7–10)	Maples Pavilion (7,106); Stanford, CA
March 6, 2010; 3:00 PM, FSN		California	L 61–71	13–17 (7–11)	Maples Pavilion (7,329); Stanford, CA
Pac-10 tournament
March 11, 2010; 6:00 pm, FSN	(7)	vs. (2) Arizona State; Quarterfinals	W 70–61	14–17	Staples Center (-); Los Angeles, CA
March 12, 2010; 8:45 pm, FSN	(7)	vs. (3) Washington; Semifinals	L 64–79	14–18	Staples Center (15,971); Los Angeles, CA
*Non-conference game. ^{#}Rankings from AP Poll. (#) Tournament seedings in parentheses. All times are in Pacific Standard Time.
