= 2009–10 UCLA Bruins men's basketball team =

American college basketball season

2009–10 UCLA Bruins men's basketball
- Conference: Pacific-10 Conference
- Record: 14–18 (8–10, T5th Pac-10)
- Head coach: Ben Howland (7th season)
- Assistant coaches: Donny Daniels; Scott Duncan; Scott Garson
- Home arena: Pauley Pavilion

2009–10 Pacific-10 Conference men's basketball standings
| | Conf. | | | | Overall |
| Team | W | | L | PCT | W | | L | PCT |
|---|---|---|---|---|---|---|---|---|
| California | 13 | – | 5 | .722 | 24 | – | 11 | .686 |
| Arizona State | 12 | – | 6 | .667 | 22 | – | 11 | .667 |
| Washington † | 11 | – | 7 | .611 | 26 | – | 10 | .722 |
| Arizona | 10 | – | 8 | .556 | 16 | – | 15 | .516 |
| USC* | 8 | – | 10 | .444 | 16 | – | 14 | .533 |
| Oregon State | 8 | – | 10 | .444 | 14 | – | 18 | .438 |
| UCLA | 8 | – | 10 | .444 | 14 | – | 18 | .438 |
| Stanford | 7 | – | 11 | .389 | 14 | – | 17 | .452 |
| Oregon | 7 | – | 11 | .389 | 16 | – | 16 | .500 |
| Washington State | 6 | – | 12 | .333 | 16 | – | 15 | .516 |
† Conference tournament winner As of March 25, 2010; Rankings from AP Poll * Ineligible for conference tournament

The 2009–10 UCLA Bruins men's basketball team represented University of California, Los Angeles during the 2009–10 NCAA Division I men's basketball season. The Bruins were led by head coach Ben Howland and played their home games at Pauley Pavilion. They finished the season 14–18, 8–10 in Pac-10 play and lost in the semifinals of the 2010 Pacific-10 Conference men's basketball tournament. They were not invited to a post season tournament.

== Recruiting class ==
- In November 2009, five student-athletes signed a national letters of intent to attend UCLA. They are Tyler Honeycutt, a 6-foot-8-inch, 190-pound guard/forward out of Sylmar, Calif. (Sylmar HS); Brendan Lane, a 6-foot-10-inch, 205-pound forward from Rocklin, Calif. (Rocklin HS); Mike Moser, a 6-foot-7-inch, 185 pound forward out of Portland, Oregon (Grant HS); Reeves Nelson, a 6-foot-7-inch, 220-pound forward out of Modesto, Calif. (Modesto Christian HS) and Anthony Stover, a 6-foot-10-inch, 210-pound center from La Cañada, Calif. (Windward HS).
- Tyler Lamb, Mater Dei's 6'4", 190-pound shooting guard, and Josh Smith, a 6'10", 280-pound center from Kentwood, have signed a letter of intent to play for UCLA next season. Lazeric Jones, of John A. Logan College, in Carterville, Illinois, is 6'1", 195 pounds, and he will be a junior for UCLA next year.

College recruiting information
| Name | Hometown | School | Height | Weight | Commit date |
|---|---|---|---|---|---|
| Tyler Honeycutt; SF | Sylmar, CA | Sylmar HS | 6 ft 8 in (2.03 m) | 190 lb (86 kg) | Sep 17, 2008 |
| Tyler Honeycutt; SF | Recruit ratings: Scout: Rivals: (93) | | | | |
| Brendan Lane; PF | Rocklin, CA | Rocklin HS | 6 ft 10 in (2.08 m) | 205 lb (93 kg) | Jun 14, 2008 |
| Brendan Lane; PF | Recruit ratings: Scout: Rivals: (92) | | | | |
| Mike Moser; SF | Portland, OR | Grant HS | 6 ft 7 in (2.01 m) | 185 lb (84 kg) | Nov 19, 2008 |
| Mike Moser; SF | Recruit ratings: Scout: Rivals: (92) | | | | |
| Reeves Nelson; PF | Modesto, CA | Modesto Christian HS | 6 ft 7 in (2.01 m) | 220 lb (100 kg) | Jan 9, 2008 |
| Reeves Nelson; PF | Recruit ratings: Scout: Rivals: (89) | | | | |
| Anthony Stover; C | Los Angeles, CA | Windward HS | 6 ft 10 in (2.08 m) | 200 lb (91 kg) | Oct 3, 2008 |
| Anthony Stover; C | Recruit ratings: Scout: Rivals: (88) | | | | |
Overall recruit ranking: Scout: 9 Rivals: 13 ESPN: 8
Note: In many cases, Scout, Rivals, 247Sports, On3, and ESPN may conflict in their listings of height and weight.; In these cases, the average was taken. ESPN grades are on a 100-point scale.; Sources: "UCLA Commit List for 2009". Rivals.; "Men's Basketball Recruiting". Scout.; "ESPN - UCLA Bruins Basketball Recruiting 2009". ESPN.; "Scout.com Team Recruiting Rankings". Scout.; "2009 Team Ranking". Rivals.

== Roster ==
2009–10 UCLA Bruins men's basketball team
Players
Coaches

| Pos. | # | Name | Height | Weight | Year | Hometown |
|---|---|---|---|---|---|---|
| G | 10 | Mustafa Abdul-Hamid | 6 ft 2 in (1.88 m) | 195 lb (88 kg) | RS Jr | St. Louis, Missouri |
| G | 5 | Jerime Anderson | 6 ft 1 in (1.85 m) | 165 lb (75 kg) | So | Anaheim, California |
| G | 15 | Balke Arnet | 6 ft 0 in (1.83 m) | 185 lb (84 kg) | So | Laguna Niguel, California |
| G | 24 | Matt DeMarcus | 6 ft 3 in (1.91 m) | 190 lb (86 kg) | So | Solvang, California |
| F | 41 | Nikola Dragović | 6 ft 9 in (2.06 m) | 216 lb (98 kg) | Sr | Belgrade, Serbia |
| F | 23 | Tyler Honeycutt | 6 ft 9 in (2.06 m) | 180 lb (82 kg) | Fr | Los Angeles, California |
| F | 13 | James Keefe | 6 ft 8 in (2.03 m) | 238 lb (108 kg) | Sr | Rancho Santa Margarita, California |
| F | 21 | Brendan Lane | 6 ft 9 in (2.06 m) | 205 lb (93 kg) | Fr | Rocklin, California |
| G | 3 | Malcolm Lee | 6 ft 5 in (1.96 m) | 180 lb (82 kg) | So | Moreno Valley, California |
| C | 22 | J'mison Morgan | 6 ft 10 in (2.08 m) | 248 lb (112 kg) | So | Dallas, Texas |
| F | 1 | Mike Moser | 6 ft 8 in (2.03 m) | 195 lb (88 kg) | Fr | Portland, Oregon |
| F | 11 | Reeves Nelson | 6 ft 8 in (2.03 m) | 225 lb (102 kg) | Fr | Modesto, California |
| G | 20 | Michael Roll (C) | 6 ft 5 in (1.96 m) | 200 lb (91 kg) | RS Sr | Aliso Viejo, California |
| G | 2 | Spencer Soo | 5 ft 8 in (1.73 m) | 160 lb (73 kg) | Jr | Fresno, California |
| C | 12 | Anthony Stover | 6 ft 10 in (2.08 m) | 225 lb (102 kg) | Fr | Pasadena, California |
| G | 4 | Tyler Trapani | 6 ft 0 in (1.83 m) | 185 lb (84 kg) | Fr | Simi Valley, California |

Head coach

Ben Howland (Weber State)

Assistant coach(es)

- Donny Daniels (Cal State Fullerton)
- Scott Duncan
- Scott Garson (UCSB)

Legend

- (C) Team captain
- (S) Suspended
- (I) Ineligible
- (W) Walk-on
- Injured
- Current redshirt

== Schedule ==
| Date time, TV | Rank^{#} | Opponent^{#} | Result | Record | Site city, state |
Exhibition
| November 4, 2009*; 7:30 p.m., uclabruins.com | | Concordia | W 62–61 | | Pauley Pavilion; Los Angeles, CA |
| November 10, 2009*; 7:30 p.m., uclabruins.com | | Humboldt State | W 74–57 | | Pauley Pavilion; Los Angeles, CA |
Non-Conference Season
| November 16, 2009*; 9:00 p.m., ESPN | | Cal State Fullerton; ESPN 24 Hour Tip-Off Marathon | L 65–68 ^{2OT} | 0–1 | Pauley Pavilion (6,145); Los Angeles, CA |
| November 20, 2009*; 7:30 p.m., FSW | | Cal State Bakersfield | W 75–64 | 1–1 | Pauley Pavilion (6,782); Los Angeles, CA |
| November 23, 2009*; 8:00 p.m., FSW | | Pepperdine | W 71–52 | 2–1 | Pauley Pavilion (7,316); Los Angeles, CA |
| November 26, 2009*; 8:00 p.m., ESPN2 | | vs. Portland; 76 Classic | L 47–74 | 2–2 | Anaheim Convention Center (2,697); Anaheim, CA |
| November 27, 2009*; 8:30 p.m., ESPNU | | vs. Butler; 76 Classic | L 67–69 | 2–3 | Anaheim Convention Center (3,027); Anaheim, CA |
| November 29, 2009*; 11:30 a.m., ESPNU | | vs. Long Beach State; 76 Classic | L 68–79 | 2–4 | Anaheim Convention Center (2,247); Anaheim, CA |
| December 6, 2009*; 2:30 p.m., FSN | | Kansas; Big 12/Pac-10 Hardwood Series | L 61–73 | 2–5 | Pauley Pavilion (10,451); Los Angeles, CA |
| December 12, 2009*; 1:30 p.m., FSN | | vs. Mississippi State; John R. Wooden Classic | L 54–72 | 2–6 | Honda Center (13,043); Anaheim, CA |
| December 15, 2009*; 7:30 p.m., Prime Ticket | | New Mexico State | W 100–68 | 3–6 | Pauley Pavilion (5,933); Los Angeles, CA |
| December 19, 2009*; 11:00 a.m., CBS | | at Notre Dame | L 73–84 | 3–7 | Edmund P. Joyce Center (9,149); Notre Dame, IN |
| December 22, 2009*; 7:30 p.m., uclabruins.com | | Colorado State | W 75–63 | 4–7 | Pauley Pavilion (6,755); Los Angeles, CA |
| December 27, 2009*; 1:00 p.m., uclabruins.com | | Delaware State | W 66–49 | 5–7 | Pauley Pavilion (7,244); Los Angeles, CA |
Conference Season
| December 31, 2009; 1:30 p.m., FSN | | Arizona State | W 72–70 | 6–7 (1–0) | Pauley Pavilion (8,008); Los Angeles, CA |
| January 2, 2010; 10:00 a.m., CBS | | Arizona | L 63–77 | 6–8 (1–1) | Pauley Pavilion (8,681); Los Angeles, CA |
| January 6, 2010; 7:30 p.m., FSN/FSW | | at California | W 76–75 ^{OT} | 7–8 (2–1) | Haas Pavilion (10,005); Berkeley, CA |
| January 9, 2010; 3:00 p.m., Prime Ticket | | at Stanford | L 59–70 | 7–9 (2–2) | Maples Pavilion (6,946); Stanford, CA |
| January 16, 2010; 4:30 p.m., Prime Ticket | | USC | L 46–67 | 7–10 (2–3) | Pauley Pavilion (11,108); Los Angeles, CA |
| January 21, 2010; 7:30 p.m., FSN | | Washington | W 62–61 | 8–10 (3–3) | Pauley Pavilion (6,503); Los Angeles, CA |
| January 23, 2010; 1:00 p.m., FSN | | Washington State | W 74–62 | 9–10 (4–3) | Pauley Pavilion (8,349); Los Angeles, CA |
| January 28, 2010; 7:30 p.m., FSN | | at Oregon | L 66–71 | 9–11 (4–4) | McArthur Court (7,528); Eugene, OR |
| January 30, 2010; 4:30 p.m., Prime Ticket | | at Oregon State | W 62–52 | 10–11 (5–4) | Gill Coliseum (8,067); Corvallis, OR |
| February 4, 2010; 7:30 p.m., Prime Ticket | | Stanford | W 77–73 | 11–11 (6–4) | Pauley Pavilion (8,903); Los Angeles, CA |
| February 6, 2010; 1:00 p.m., CBS | | California | L 58–71 | 11–12 (6–5) | Pauley Pavilion (10,450); Los Angeles, CA |
| February 14, 2010; 7:00 p.m., FSN | | at USC | L 64–68 | 11–13 (6–6) | Galen Center (8,836); Los Angeles, CA |
| February 18, 2010; 5:30 p.m., FSN | | at Washington State | W 71–51 | 12–13 (7–6) | Beasley Coliseum (6,566); Pullman, WA |
| February 20, 2010; 6:00 p.m., ESPN | | at Washington; ESPN College GameDay | L 68–97 | 12–14 (7–7) | Hec Edmundson Pavilion (10,000); Seattle, WA |
| February 25, 2010; 8:00 p.m., FSN | | Oregon State | W 65–56 | 13–14 (8–7) | Pauley Pavilion (7,589); Los Angeles, CA |
| February 27, 2010; 2:00 p.m., Prime Ticket | | Oregon | L 68–70 | 13–15 (8–8) | Pauley Pavilion (9,073); Los Angeles, CA |
| March 4, 2010; 7:30 p.m., FSN | | at Arizona | L 73–78 | 13–16 (8–9) | McKale Center (14,407); Tucson, AZ |
| March 6, 2010; 1:00 p.m., CBS | | at Arizona State | L 46–56 | 13–17 (8–10) | Wells Fargo Arena (9,039); Tempe, AZ |
Pac-10 Tournament
| March 11, 2010; 12:00 p.m., FSN | (5) | vs. (4) Arizona; Quarterfinals | W 75–69 | 14–17 | Staples Center (12,125); Los Angeles, CA |
| March 12, 2010; 6:00 p.m., FSN | (5) | vs. (1) California; Pac-10 Semifinals | L 72–85 | 14–18 | Staples Center (15,971); Los Angeles, CA |
*Non-conference game. ^{#}Rankings from AP Poll. (#) Tournament seedings in parentheses. All times are in Pacific Time.

== See also ==
- 2009–10 NCAA Division I men's basketball rankings
- List of UCLA Bruins in the NBA

== Notes ==
- Freshman Jrue Holiday left the team to go to the NBA. Seniors Darren Collison, Josh Shipp and Alfred Aboya graduated.
- 14 former UCLA players are on the NBA teams on opening day.
- Starter power forward Nikola Dragovic, who averaged 9.4points per game, is returning.
- November 20, 2009 – Dragovic was suspended for the November 20 and 23 games after the Los Angeles County District Attorney filed felony assault charges for an off-court altercation at a Hollywood concert.
- November 26, 2009 – UCLA's worst defeat in the Ben Howland era.
- November 29, 2009 - Long Beach State's first ever win over UCLA.
- December 1, 2009 - Head coach Ben Howland announced that by mutual agreement, sophomore forward Drew Gordon has left the team. Gordon would transfer at the end of the school quarter.
- Feb. 18, 2010 – Senior forward James Keefe's career at UCLA ends with a left shoulder injury.
- July 13, 2010 - Mustafa Abdul-Hamid has been named a recipient of the Pac-10 Postgraduate Scholarship for 2009-10.
