= 2009–10 Oregon State Beavers men's basketball team =

American college basketball season

2009–10 Oregon State Beavers men's basketball

CBI First Round
- Conference: Pacific-10 Conference
- Record: 14–18 (8–10 Pac-10)
- Head coach: Craig Robinson
- Assistant coaches: Doug Stewart; Nate Pomeday; David Grace
- Home arena: Gill Coliseum

2009–10 Pacific-10 Conference men's basketball standings
| | Conf. | | | | Overall |
| Team | W | | L | PCT | W | | L | PCT |
|---|---|---|---|---|---|---|---|---|
| California | 13 | – | 5 | .722 | 24 | – | 11 | .686 |
| Arizona State | 12 | – | 6 | .667 | 22 | – | 11 | .667 |
| Washington † | 11 | – | 7 | .611 | 26 | – | 10 | .722 |
| Arizona | 10 | – | 8 | .556 | 16 | – | 15 | .516 |
| USC* | 8 | – | 10 | .444 | 16 | – | 14 | .533 |
| Oregon State | 8 | – | 10 | .444 | 14 | – | 18 | .438 |
| UCLA | 8 | – | 10 | .444 | 14 | – | 18 | .438 |
| Stanford | 7 | – | 11 | .389 | 14 | – | 17 | .452 |
| Oregon | 7 | – | 11 | .389 | 16 | – | 16 | .500 |
| Washington State | 6 | – | 12 | .333 | 16 | – | 15 | .516 |
† Conference tournament winner As of March 25, 2010; Rankings from AP Poll * Ineligible for conference tournament

The 2009–10 Oregon State Beavers men's basketball team represented Oregon State University in the 2009-10 college basketball season. Their head coach was Craig Robinson, who was in his second year. The team played their home games at Gill Coliseum in Corvallis, Oregon and were members of the Pacific-10 Conference. They finished the season 14–18, 8–10 in Pac-10 play and lost in the quarterfinals of the 2010 Pacific-10 Conference men's basketball tournament. Despite a sub .500 record, the Beavers were invited to the 2010 College Basketball Invitational, where they lost in the first round.

== 2009 recruiting class ==
College recruiting
| Name | Hometown | School | Height | Weight | Commit date |
|---|---|---|---|---|---|
| Angus Brandt; C | Lake Forest, IL | Lake Forest Academy | 6 ft 10 in (2.08 m) | 215 lb (98 kg) | Feb 19, 2009 |
| Angus Brandt; C | Recruit ratings: Scout: Rivals: (84) | | | | |
| Rhys Murphy; SF | Lee, ME | Lee Academy | 6 ft 7 in (2.01 m) | 180 lb (82 kg) | Feb 23, 2009 |
| Rhys Murphy; SF | Recruit ratings: Scout: Rivals: (74) | | | | |
| Jared Cunningham; PG | San Leandro, CA | San Leandro High School | 6 ft 3 in (1.91 m) | 165 lb (75 kg) | Jan 7, 2009 |
| Jared Cunningham; PG | Recruit ratings: Scout: Rivals: (79) | | | | |
| Roberto Nelson; SG | Santa Barbara, CA | Santa Barbara High School | 6 ft 4 in (1.93 m) | 185 lb (84 kg) | Sep 9, 2008 |
| Roberto Nelson; SG | Recruit ratings: Scout: Rivals: (92) | | | | |
| Joe Burton; C | Hemet, CA | West Valley High School | 6 ft 7 in (2.01 m) | 270 lb (120 kg) | Aug 4, 2008 |
| Joe Burton; C | Recruit ratings: Scout: Rivals: (87) | | | | |
Overall recruit ranking: Scout: 25 Rivals: 23
Note: In many cases, Scout, Rivals, 247Sports, On3, and ESPN may conflict in their listings of height and weight.; In these cases, the average was taken. ESPN grades are on a 100-point scale.; Sources: "Oregon State Commit List for 2009". Rivals.; "Men's Basketball Recruiting". Scout.; "ESPN - Oregon State Beavers Basketball Recruiting 2009". ESPN.; "Scout.com Team Recruiting Rankings". Scout.; "2009 Team Ranking". Rivals.

== Roster ==
2009–10 Oregon State Beavers men's basketball team
Players
Coaches

| Pos. | # | Name | Height | Weight | Year | Hometown |
|---|---|---|---|---|---|---|
| F | 0 | Kevin McShane | 6 ft 9 in (2.06 m) | 215 lb (98 kg) | So | Clackamas, Oregon |
| G | 1 | Jared Cunningham | 6 ft 3 in (1.91 m) | 170 lb (77 kg) | Fr | San Leandro, California |
| C | 2 | Calvin Hampton | 6 ft 10 in (2.08 m) | 250 lb (113 kg) | Sr | Fort Washington, Maryland |
| G | 3 | Chris Richard | 6 ft 3 in (1.91 m) | 190 lb (86 kg) | Fr | Portland, Oregon |
| F | 4 | David Sturner | 6 ft 8 in (2.03 m) | 205 lb (93 kg) | Fr | Philomath, Oregon |
| G | 5 | Josh Tarver | 6 ft 3 in (1.91 m) | 185 lb (84 kg) | Sr | Portland, Oregon |
| C | 10 | Roeland Schaftenaar | 6 ft 11 in (2.11 m) | 240 lb (109 kg) | Sr | Utrecht, Netherlands |
| F | 11 | Joe Burton | 6 ft 7 in (2.01 m) | 270 lb (122 kg) | Fr | Hemet, California |
| C | 12 | Angus Brandt | 6 ft 10 in (2.08 m) | 215 lb (98 kg) | Fr | Sydney, Australia |
| F | 13 | Rhys Murphy | 6 ft 7 in (2.01 m) | 185 lb (84 kg) | Fr | Sydney, Australia |
| F | 15 | Seth Tarver | 6 ft 5 in (1.96 m) | 205 lb (93 kg) | Sr | Portland, Oregon |
| G | 22 | Calvin Haynes | 6 ft 2 in (1.88 m) | 185 lb (84 kg) | Jr | Reseda, California |
| F | 24 | Omari Johnson | 6 ft 7 in (2.01 m) | 205 lb (93 kg) | Jr | Los Angeles, California |
| F | 30 | Daniel Deane | 6 ft 8 in (2.03 m) | 245 lb (111 kg) | Jr | Park City, Utah |
| G | 34 | Lathen Wallace | 6 ft 3 in (1.91 m) | 200 lb (91 kg) | Jr | Portland, Oregon |
| G | 55 | Roberto Nelson | 6 ft 4 in (1.93 m) | 190 lb (86 kg) | Fr | Santa Barbara, California |

Head coach

- Craig Robinson (Princeton)

Assistant coach(es)

- Doug Stewart (Brown)
- Nate Pomeday (Northwestern)
- David Grace (Park)

Legend

- (C) Team captain
- (S) Suspended
- (I) Ineligible
- (W) Walk-on
- Injured
- Current redshirt

Roster
Last update: 2009-11-24

== Schedule ==
| Date time, TV | Rank^{#} | Opponent^{#} | Result | Record | Site (attendance) city, state |
Exhibition
| 11/01/2009*; 2:00 pm | | Southern Oregon | W 94–53 | — | Gill Coliseum (2,477); Corvallis, OR |
| 11/07/2009*; 1:00 pm | | Western Oregon | W 75–55 | — | Gill Coliseum (2,047); Corvallis, OR |
Regular season
| 11/13/2009*; 6:00 pm | | vs. Texas A&M–Corpus Christi; Dual at the Desert | L 43–67 | 0–1 | United Spirit Arena (8,541); Lubbock, TX |
| 11/14/2009*; 6:00 pm | | vs. South Dakota; Dual at the Desert | W 62–47 | 1–1 | United Spirit Arena (7,761); Lubbock, TX |
| 11/15/2009*; 1:00 pm | | at Texas Tech; Dual at the Desert | L 60–64 | 1–2 | United Spirit Arena (7,860); Lubbock, TX |
| 11/21/2009*; 12:00 pm | | Sacramento State | L 63–65 | 1–3 | Gill Coliseum (4,316); Corvallis, OR |
| 11/28/2009*; 11:00 am | | at George Washington | W 64–57 | 2–3 | Charles E. Smith Athletic Center (2,401); Washington, D.C. |
| 12/04/2009*; 8:00 pm, FSN | | Colorado; Big 12/Pac-10 Hardwood Series | W 74–69 | 3–3 | Gill Coliseum (5,417); Corvallis, OR |
| 12/06/2009*; 2:00 pm | | Cal State Bakersfield | W 74–39 | 4–3 | Gill Coliseum (4,927); Corvallis, OR |
| 12/12/2009*; 5:00 pm | | at Nebraska | L 44–50 | 4–4 | Bob Devaney Sports Center (10,553); Lincoln, NE |
| 12/16/2009*; 5:00 pm | | at UIC | L 61–63 | 4–5 | UIC Pavilion (3,906); Chicago, IL |
| 12/19/2009*; 7:00 pm | | Mississippi Valley State | W 76–62 | 5–5 | Gill Coliseum (4,723); Corvallis, OR |
| 12/23/2009*; 5:30 pm, FSNNW | | Fresno State | W 73–65 | 6–5 | Gill Coliseum (4,167); Corvallis, OR |
| 12/31/2009; 7:00 pm, FSNNW | | at Washington | L 70–76 | 6–6 (0–1) | Bank of America Arena (9,843); Seattle, WA |
| 01/02/2010; 4:00 pm, FSNNW | | at Washington State | L 60–65 | 6–7 (0–2) | Beasley Coliseum (5,967); Pullman, WA |
| 01/06/2010*; 5:30 pm, FSNNW | | Seattle | L 48–99 | 6–8 | Gill Coliseum (4,622); Corvallis, OR |
| 01/10/2010; 7:30 pm, FSN | | at Oregon; Civil War | W 64–57 | 7–8 (1–2) | McArthur Court (8,217); Eugene, OR |
| 01/14/2010; 7:00 pm | | Arizona | W 67–64 | 8–8 (2–2) | Gill Coliseum (6,746); Corvallis, OR |
| 01/16/2010; 3:30 pm, FSNNW | | Arizona State | L 57–66 | 8–9 (2–3) | Gill Coliseum (7,472); Corvallis, OR |
| 01/21/2010; 7:00 pm | | at Stanford | L 35–59 | 8–10 (2–4) | Maples Pavilion (6,460); Stanford, CA |
| 01/23/2010; 11:00 am, CBS | | at California | L 61–65 | 8–11 (2–5) | Haas Pavilion (8,666); Berkeley, CA |
| 01/28/2010; 5:30 pm, FSNNW | | USC | W 51–45 | 9–11 (3–5) | Gill Coliseum (6,654); Corvallis, OR |
| 01/30/2010; 4:30 pm, FSNNW | | UCLA | L 52–62 | 9–12 (3–6) | Gill Coliseum (8,067); Corvallis, OR |
| 02/06/2010; 3:00 pm, FSNNW | | Oregon; Civil War | W 62–42 | 10–12 (4–6) | Gill Coliseum (9,124); Corvallis, OR |
| 02/11/2010; 5:30 pm | | at Arizona State | L 46–56 | 10–13 (4–7) | Wells Fargo Arena (6,962); Tempe, AZ |
| 02/13/2010; 5:00 pm | | at Arizona | W 63–55 | 11–13 (5–7) | McKale Center (14,566); Tucson, AZ |
| 02/18/2010; 7:30 pm, FSN | | California | W 80–64 | 12–13 (6–7) | Gill Coliseum (6,609); Corvallis, OR |
| 02/20/2010; 12:00 pm, FSN | | Stanford | L 55–65 | 12–14 (6–8) | Gill Coliseum (7,061); Corvallis, OR |
| 02/25/2010; 8:00 pm, FSN | | at UCLA | L 56–65 | 12–15 (6–9) | Pauley Pavilion (7,589); Los Angeles, CA |
| 02/27/2010; 4:30 pm | | at USC | W 49–44 | 13–15 (7–9) | Galen Center (6,158); Los Angeles, CA |
| 03/04/2010; 7:00 pm | | Washington State | W 59–55 | 14–15 (8–9) | Gill Coliseum (6,507); Corvallis, OR |
| 03/06/2010; 5:00 pm, FSNNW | | Washington | L 70–82 | 14–16 (8–10) | Gill Coliseum (8,014); Corvallis, OR |
Pac-10 tournament
| 03/11/10; 7:40 pm, FSN | (6) | vs. (3) Washington; Pac-10 Quarterfinals | L 52–59 | 14–17 | Staples Center (12,255); Los Angeles, CA |
CBI
| 03/17/2010; 7:00 pm | | Boston University; CBI First Round | L 78–96 | 14–18 | Gill Coliseum (2,913); Corvallis, OR |
*Non-conference game. ^{#}Rankings from AP Poll. (#) Tournament seedings in parentheses. All times are in Pacific Time.

== Highlights ==
- December 6, 2009 – After winning just one of their first four games, the Beavers won their next three games in a row.
- Sweeps of archrival Oregon, 2009 Pac-10 Tournament Champion USC, and perennial power Arizona
- February 13, 2010 - First win at Arizona (McKale Center, Tucson) in 27 years
- Seth Tarver was awarded Pac-10 Defensive Player of the Year
- Calvin Haynes was named to the All-Pac-10 Second Team.
