= 2009–10 Washington Huskies men's basketball team =

American college basketball season

2009–10 Washington Huskies men's basketball

Pacific-10 Tournament champions

NCAA tournament, Sweet Sixteen
- Conference: Pacific-10 Conference

Ranking
- Coaches: No. 21
- Record: 26–10 (11–7 Pac-10)
- Head coach: Lorenzo Romar
- Assistant coaches: Raphael Chillious; Paul Fortier; Jim Shaw
- Home arena: Bank of America Arena

2009–10 Pacific-10 Conference men's basketball standings
	Conf.				Overall
Team	W		L	PCT	W		L	PCT
California	13	–	5	.722	24	–	11	.686
Arizona State	12	–	6	.667	22	–	11	.667
Washington †	11	–	7	.611	26	–	10	.722
Arizona	10	–	8	.556	16	–	15	.516
USC*	8	–	10	.444	16	–	14	.533
Oregon State	8	–	10	.444	14	–	18	.438
UCLA	8	–	10	.444	14	–	18	.438
Stanford	7	–	11	.389	14	–	17	.452
Oregon	7	–	11	.389	16	–	16	.500
Washington State	6	–	12	.333	16	–	15	.516
† Conference tournament winner As of March 25, 2010; Rankings from AP Poll * Ineligible for conference tournament

The 2009–10 Washington Huskies men's basketball team represented the University of Washington in the 2009–10 college basketball season. This was head coach Lorenzo Romar's 8th season at Washington. The Huskies played their home games at Bank of America Arena and were members of the Pacific-10 Conference. They finished the season 26–10, 11–7 in Pac-10 play and defeated California in the finals of the Pac-10 Tournament to claim the conference tournament championship and an automatic bid to the 2010 NCAA Division I men's basketball tournament. They earned an 11 seed in the East Region, where they upset 6 seed Marquette in the first round and 3 seed and AP #8 New Mexico in the second round, to advance to the Sweet Sixteen, where they were defeated by 2 seed and AP #6 West Virginia to end their season.

== Pre-season ==
In the Pac-10 preseason poll, released October 29 in Los Angeles, CA during the Pac-10 media days, Washington was selected to finish 2nd in the conference.

== 2009–10 team ==
=== Roster ===
A number of players on this team would one day play in the NBA. The list includes:

- Isaiah Thomas
- Quincy Pondexter
- Justin Holiday
- CJ Wilcox

#	Name	Height	Weight (lbs.)	Position	Class	Hometown	Previous team(s)
1	Venoy Overton	5'11"	185	G	Jr.	Seattle, WA, U.S.	Franklin HS
2	Isaiah Thomas	5'8"	185	G	So.	Tacoma, WA, U.S.	South Kent School
10	Abdul Gaddy	6'3"	190	G	Fr.	Tacoma, WA, U.S.	Bellarmine Prep
11	Matthew Bryan-Amaning	6'9"	240	F	Jr.	London, England, U.K.	South Kent School
12	Clarence Trent	6'5"	225	F	Fr.	Tacoma, WA, U.S.	The Patterson School
15	Scott Suggs	6'6"	185	G	So.	Washington, MO, U.S.	Washington HS
20	Quincy Pondexter	6'6"	215	F	Sr.	Fresno, CA, U.S.	San Joaquin Memorial HS
22	Justin Holiday	6'6"	180	F	Jr.	Chatsworth, CA, U.S.	Campbell Hall School
23	C. J. Wilcox	6'5"	180	G	Fr.	Pleasant Grove, UT, U.S.	Pleasant Grove HS
31	Elston Turner	6'4"	205	G	So.	Missouri City, TX, U.S.	Elkins HS
33	Tyreese Breshers	6'7"	255	F	Fr.	Los Angeles, CA, U.S.	Price HS
42	Brendan Sherrer	6'9"	240	F	So.	Monroe, WA, U.S.	Archbishop Murphy HS
44	Darnell Gant	6'8"	225	F	RS So.	Los Angeles, CA, U.S.	Crenshaw HS

=== Coaching staff ===
Name	Position	Year at Washington	Alma mater (year)
Lorenzo Romar	Head coach	8th	Washington (1980)
Raphael Chillious	Assistant coach	2nd	Lafayette (1996)
Paul Fortier	Assistant coach	5th	Washington (2003)
Jim Shaw	Assistant coach	6th	Western Oregon State (1985)
Lance LaVetter	Director of basketball operations	8th	Northern Arizona (1992)

== 2009–10 schedule and results ==
- All times are Pacific

Date time, TV	Rank^{#}	Opponent^{#}	Result	Record	Site (attendance) city, state
Exhibition
11/04/2009; 7:00 pm	No. 14	Central Washington	W 77–48	–	Bank of America Arena (8,570); Seattle, WA
Regular season
11/13/2009*; 7:00 pm, FSNNW	No. 14	Wright State; Athletes In Action Basketball Classic	W 74–69	1–0	Bank of America Arena (8,239); Seattle, WA
11/14/2009*; 7:00 pm	No. 14	Belmont; Athletes In Action Basketball Classic	W 96–78	2–0	Bank of America Arena (8,410); Seattle, WA
11/15/2009*; 7:00 pm, FSNNW	No. 14	Portland State; Athletes In Action Basketball Classic	W 111–55	3–0	Bank of America Arena (8,236); Seattle, WA
11/20/2009*; 8:00 pm, FSNNW	No. 14	San Jose State	W 80–70	4–0	Bank of America Arena (8,155); Seattle, WA
11/29/2009*; 6:00 pm, FSNNW	No. 14	Montana	W 63–59	5–0	Bank of America Arena (8,515); Seattle, WA
12/03/2009*; 6:00 pm, ESPN2	No. 12	at Texas Tech; Big 12/Pac-10 Hardwood Series	L 92–99 ^{OT}	5–1	United Spirit Arena (9,912); Lubbock, TX
12/06/2009*; 7:00 pm, FSNNW	No. 12	Cal State Northridge	W 88–76	6–1	Bank of America Arena (8,125); Seattle, WA
12/12/2009*; 11:00 am, FSN	No. 17	vs. No. 15 Georgetown; John R. Wooden Classic	L 66–74	6–2	Honda Center (N/A); Anaheim, CA
12/19/2009*; 7:00 pm, FSNNW	No. 24	Portland	W 89–54	7–2	Bank of America Arena (9,275); Seattle, WA
12/22/2009*; 8:00 pm, FSN	No. 22	Texas A&M	W 73–64	8–2	Bank of America Arena (10,000); Seattle, WA
12/27/2009*; 12:00 pm, FSNNW	No. 22	San Francisco	W 86–71	9–2	Bank of America Arena (9,949); Seattle, WA
12/31/2009; 7:00 pm, FSNNW	No. 17	Oregon State	W 76–70	10–2 (1–0)	Bank of America Arena (9,843); Seattle, WA
01/02/2010; 2:00 pm, FSNNW	No. 17	Oregon	L 79–90	10–3 (1–1)	Bank of America Arena (10,000); Seattle, WA
01/08/2010; 7:30 pm, FSNNW	No. 24	at Arizona State	L 51–68	10–4 (1–2)	Wells Fargo Arena (7,682); Tempe, AZ
01/10/2010; 2:30 pm, FSNNW	No. 24	at Arizona	L 70–87	10–5 (1–3)	McKale Center (12,899); Tucson, AZ
01/14/2010; 7:30 pm, FSN		Stanford	W 94–61	11–5 (2–3)	Bank of America Arena (9,720); Seattle, WA
01/16/2010; 11:30 am, FSN		California	W 84–69	12–5 (3–3)	Bank of America Arena (9,897); Seattle, WA
01/21/2010; 7:30 pm, FSN		at UCLA	L 61–62	12–6 (3–4)	Pauley Pavilion (6,503); Los Angeles, CA
01/23/2010; 7:30 pm, FSNNW		at USC	L 61–87	12–7 (3–5)	Galen Center (5,876); Los Angeles, CA
01/26/2010*; 7:00 pm, FSNNW		Seattle; Rivalry	W 123–76	13–7	Bank of America Arena (10,000); Seattle, WA
01/30/2010; 12:30 pm, FSN		Washington State	W 92–64	14–7 (4–5)	Bank of America Arena (10,000); Seattle, WA
02/04/2010; 7:30 pm, FSN		Arizona	W 81–75	15–7 (5–5)	Bank of America Arena (9,917); Seattle, WA
02/06/2010; 7:30 pm, FSN		Arizona State	W 79–56	16–7 (6–5)	Bank of America Arena (10,000); Seattle, WA
02/11/2010; 6:00 pm, ESPN2		at California	L 81–93	16–8 (6–6)	Haas Pavilion (9,839); Berkeley, CA
02/13/2010; 5:00 pm, FSNNW		at Stanford	W 78–61	17–8 (7–6)	Maples Pavilion (6,932); Stanford, CA
02/18/2010; 7:30 pm, FSNNW		USC	L 64–67	17–9 (7–7)	Bank of America Arena (10,000); Seattle, WA
02/20/2010; 6:00 pm, ESPN		UCLA; ESPN College GameDay	W 97–68	18–9 (8–7)	Bank of America Arena (10,000); Seattle, WA
02/27/2010; 7:00 pm, FSNNW		at Washington State	W 59–52	19–9 (9–7)	Beasley Coliseum (11,671); Pullman, WA
03/04/2010; 7:00 pm		at Oregon	W 86–72	20–9 (10–7)	McArthur Court (8,004); Eugene, OR
03/06/2010; 5:00 pm, FSNNW		at Oregon State	W 82–70	21–9 (11–7)	Gill Coliseum (8,014); Corvallis, OR
Pac-10 tournament
03/11/2010; 7:40 pm, FSN	(3)	vs. (6) Oregon State; Quarterfinals	W 59–52	22–9	Staples Center (12,255); Los Angeles, CA
03/12/2010; 8:45 pm, FSN	(3)	vs. (7) Stanford; Semifinals	W 79–64	23–9	Staples Center (15,971); Los Angeles, CA
03/13/2010; 3:00 pm, CBS	(3)	vs. (1) California; Finals	W 79–75	24–9	Staples Center (15,851); Los Angeles, CA
NCAA tournament
03/18/2010*; 4:20 pm, CBS	(11)	vs. (6) Marquette; First Round	W 80–78	25–9	HP Pavilion (15,427); San Jose, CA
03/20/2010*; 2:50 pm, CBS	(11)	vs. (3) No. 8 New Mexico; Second Round	W 82–64	26–9	HP Pavilion ( 16,044); San Jose, CA
03/25/2010*; 4:27 pm, CBS	(11)	vs. (2) No. 6 West Virginia; Sweet Sixteen	L 56–69	26–10	Carrier Dome (22,271); Syracuse, NY
*Non-conference game. ^{#}Rankings from AP Poll. (#) Tournament seedings in parentheses.
