= Herb Sendek =

American basketball player and coach (born 1963)

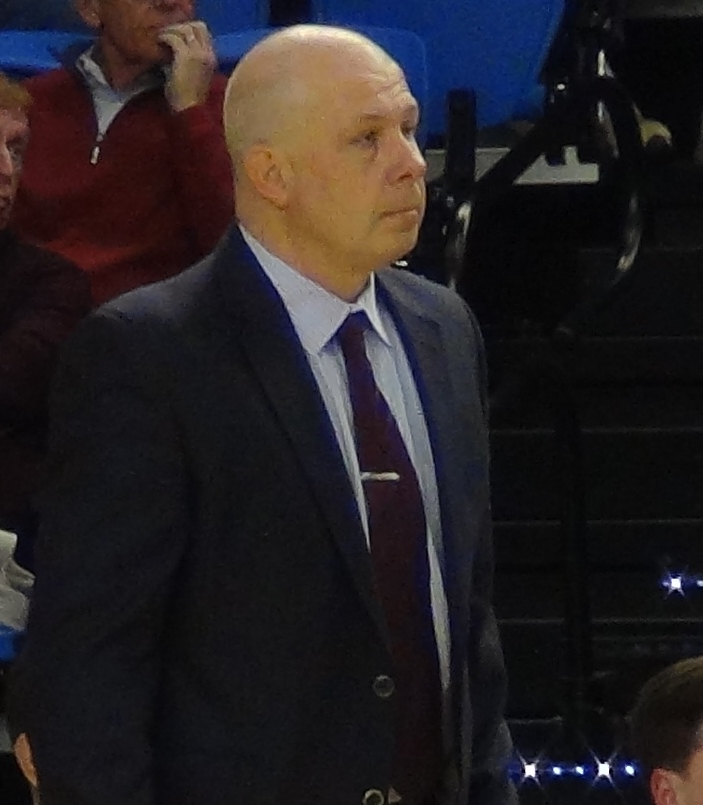
- Sendek in 2016

Current position
- Title: Head coach
- Team: Santa Clara
- Conference: WCC
- Record: 192–129 (.598)

Biographical details
- Born: February 22, 1963 (age 63); Pittsburgh, Pennsylvania, U.S.

Playing career
- 1981–1984: Carnegie Mellon

Coaching career (HC unless noted)
- 1984–1985: Central Catholic HS (PA) (assistant)
- 1985–1986: Providence (GA)
- 1986–1989: Providence (assistant)
- 1989–1993: Kentucky (assistant)
- 1993–1996: Miami (OH)
- 1996–2006: NC State
- 2006–2015: Arizona State
- 2016–present: Santa Clara

Head coaching record
- Overall: 605–424 (.588)
- Tournaments: 7–10 (NCAA Division I); 11–14 (NIT)

Accomplishments and honors

Championships
- MAC regular season (1995)

Awards
- MAC Coach of the Year (1995); ACC Coach of the Year (2004); Pac-10 Coach of the Year (2010); WCC Coach of the Year (2026)

Herbert Joseph Sendek Jr. (born February 22, 1963) is an American college basketball coach who is the current men's basketball head coach at Santa Clara.

== Early life ==
Herbert Joseph Sendek Jr. grew up in Pittsburgh and attended Penn Hills High School. He starred as a point guard in basketball, lettering two years, serving as team captain, and earning All-East Suburban honors. He graduated with a perfect 4.0 grade-point average and was valedictorian of the Class of 1981. Sendek's father, Herb Sr., was a teacher and basketball coach at both the high school and junior college levels. Sendek is of Slovak descent.

== College career ==
He played college basketball at Carnegie Mellon University, where he was a three-year letterman. He graduated summa cum laude in 1985 with a bachelor's degree in industrial management and earned the Carnegie Merit Scholarship.

== Assistant coach ==
In 1984–85, Sendek served as an assistant coach at Central Catholic High School in Pittsburgh.

Sendek served as a graduate assistant coach at Providence in 1985, then as an assistant coach at Providence from 1987 to 1989. He then served as an assistant coach at Kentucky under Rick Pitino from 1989 to 1993.

== Head coach ==
=== Miami (Ohio) ===
In 1993, Sendek accepted his first college head coaching job, at Miami University in Oxford, Ohio, succeeding Joby Wright, who left to become head coach at Wyoming. In his first season, 1993–94, the Redskins (now RedHawks) posted a 19–11 record and finished second in the Mid-American Conference (MAC).

In 1994–95, Miami improved to 23–7 overall, winning the MAC championship with a 16–2 record and earning a spot in the NCAA tournament. In the Midwest Regional, #12 seeded Miami shocked #5 seeded Arizona 71–62, before losing to #4 seeded Virginia in overtime in the second round.

In Sendek's third season at Miami, 1995–96, the team went 21–8 and finished third in the MAC. Miami earned a berth in the NIT, losing a first-round game to Fresno State, 58–57. Sendek was named the 1995 MAC Coach of the Year.

=== North Carolina State ===
After three seasons at Miami, Sendek was hired at North Carolina State in 1996, becoming the youngest head coach in the Atlantic Coast Conference (ACC). He immediately improved upon the Les Robinson era, winning 17 games for the program's first winning record in six years. The Wolfpack ended the season winning eight of 11 games, advanced to the finals of the ACC tournament, and earned a trip to the postseason in the NIT.

Sendek coached NC State to the NCAA tournament five consecutive years from 2002 until 2006 (tying the school record). He won his 100th game at NC State in 2002. In 2004, Sendek won ACC Coach of the Year and Julius Hodge, one of Sendek's most prized recruits during his NC State tenure, was named ACC Men's Basketball Player of the Year. In 2005, NC State upset defending champion Connecticut in the Second Round of the NCAA tournament to advance to the Sweet 16, NC State's deepest run into the tournament during Sendek's years.

Due in part to an 8–38 record against Duke and North Carolina combined with failing to win an ACC championship, fan and booster support was in steep decline. This ultimately played a factor in Sendek deciding to leave NC State for the head coaching vacancy at Arizona State.

=== Arizona State ===
On April 3, 2006, Sendek accepted the head coaching job at Arizona State. While his first year record in the Pac-10 was a paltry 2–16, recruiting went well: ASU signed Jerren Shipp, a highly regarded high school guard, point guard Derek Glasser from the LA area, and Eric Boateng, a McDonald's All-American who transferred from Duke. His second recruiting class included highly touted McDonald's All-American James Harden and point guard Jamelle McMillan (a four-star recruit and the son of former NC State basketball star Nate McMillan).

The 2007–08 season was a great improvement over the previous season. Sendek and freshman guard James Harden led the Sun Devils to fifth place in the Pac-10 Conference, including a sweep of rival Arizona. Arizona State was rewarded with a number 1 seed in the 2008 NIT. The 2008–09 team led by Pac-10 Player of the Year Harden improved to a 25–10 record and advanced to the second round of the NCAA tournament.

After the departure of Harden for the NBA, the Sun Devils program finished second in the Pac-10 during the 2009–10 season in what was a weak Pac-10 Conference. That year, the conference RPI was so weak, it was the first time the second-place Pac-10 team did not get an at-large invitation to the NCAA tournament. The Sun Devils instead were given a #1 Seed in the NIT and lost 67–66 to Jacksonville in Tempe. With three returning seniors, there were high expectations for the 2010–11 season with an expected run at the Pac-10 title again. However, the Sun Devils finished in last place with a record of 12–19 (4–14).

The 2011–12 season was anticipated to be better with the addition of newcomer and 2010–11 Arizona High School Player of the Year Jahii Carson. However, Carson failed to gain NCAA clearance to play. The season became even more troublesome as Sendek dismissed his leading scorer, Keala King, from the team on January 7, 2012, for undisclosed reasons. The season resulted in a tenth-place finish in the new Pac-12. A sixth-place finish followed in 2012–13 with a trip to the NIT. In 2013–14, ASU finished with a 21–12 record and a loss in the second round of the NCAA tournament.

On March 24, 2015, Sendek was fired by Arizona State after an 18–16 record, losing to USC in the Pac-12 tournament, and a trip to the NIT.

=== Santa Clara ===
On March 28, 2016, Sendek accepted the head coaching job at Santa Clara, replacing recently fired coach Kerry Keating, who was fired after nine years. On January 12, 2022, Sendek got his 500th career win against Pacific. On March 9, 2026, he got his 600th career win after a victory over Saint Mary's in the West Coast Conference men’s basketball tournament semifinals.

== Personal life ==
Sendek is married to Melanie (Scheuer); they have three daughters.

Sendek was inducted into the Penn Hills Hall of Fame and into the East Boros Chapter of the Pennsylvania Hall of Fame.

== Head coaching record ==
Record table
Season	Team	Overall	Conference	Standing	Postseason
Miami Redskins (Mid-American Conference) (1993–1996)
1993–94	Miami (OH)	19–11	12–6	2nd	NIT First Round
1994–95	Miami (OH)	23–7	16–2	1st	NCAA Division I Round of 32
1995–96	Miami (OH)	21–8	12–6	3rd	NIT First Round
Miami:		63–26 (.708)	40–14 (.741)		
NC State Wolfpack (Atlantic Coast Conference) (1996–2006)
1996–97	NC State	17–15	4–12	8th	NIT Second Round
1997–98	NC State	17–15	5–11	8th	NIT Second Round
1998–99	NC State	19–14	6–10	5th	NIT Second Round
1999–00	NC State	20–14	6–10	6th	NIT Fourth Place
2000–01	NC State	13–16	5–11	7th	
2001–02	NC State	23–11	9–7	T–3rd	NCAA Division I Round of 32
2002–03	NC State	18–13	9–7	4th	NCAA Division I Round of 64
2003–04	NC State	21–10	11–5	2nd	NCAA Division I Round of 32
2004–05	NC State	21–14	7–9	T–6th	NCAA Division I Sweet 16
2005–06	NC State	22–10	10–6	4th	NCAA Division I Round of 32
NC State:		191–132 (.591)	72–88 (.450)		
Arizona State Sun Devils (Pacific-10 Conference / Pac-12 Conference) (2006–2015)
2006–07	Arizona State	8–22	2–16	10th	
2007–08	Arizona State	21–13	9–9	5th	NIT Quarterfinal
2008–09	Arizona State	25–10	11–7	3rd	NCAA Division I Round of 32
2009–10	Arizona State	22–11	12–6	2nd	NIT First Round
2010–11	Arizona State	12–19	4–14	10th	
2011–12	Arizona State	10–21	6–12	10th	
2012–13	Arizona State	21–12	9–9	6th	NIT Second Round
2013–14	Arizona State	22–13	10–8	T–3rd	NCAA Division I Round of 64
2014–15	Arizona State	18–16	9–9	T–5th	NIT Second Round
Arizona State:		159–137 (.537)	72–90 (.444)		
Santa Clara Broncos (West Coast Conference) (2016–present)
2016–17	Santa Clara	17–16	10–8	T–4th	
2017–18	Santa Clara	11–20	8–10	7th	
2018–19	Santa Clara	16–15	8–8	T–5th	
2019–20	Santa Clara	20–13	6–10	7th	Postseason not held
2020–21	Santa Clara	12–8	4–5	6th	
2021–22	Santa Clara	21–12	10–5	3rd	NIT First Round
2022–23	Santa Clara	23–10	11–5	3rd	NIT First Round
2023–24	Santa Clara	20–13	10–6	4th	
2024–25	Santa Clara	21–13	12–6	4th	NIT Second Round
2025–26	Santa Clara	26–9	15–3	3rd	NCAA Division I Round of 64
2026–27	Santa Clara	5–0	0–0		
Santa Clara:		192–129 (.598)	94–66 (.588)		
Total:		605–424 (.588)			
National champion Postseason invitational champion Conference regular season champion Conference regular season and conference tournament champion Division regular season champion Division regular season and conference tournament champion Conference tournament champion

== See also ==
- List of college men's basketball coaches with 600 wins
