= Nic Wise =

American professional basketball player (born 1987)

Free agent
- Position: Point guard

Personal information
- Born: September 8, 1987 (age 38) Houston, Texas, U.S.
- Listed height: 5 ft 10 in (1.78 m)
- Listed weight: 180 lb (82 kg)

Career information
- High school: Kingwood (Houston, Texas)
- College: Arizona (2006–2010)
- NBA draft: 2010: undrafted
- Playing career: 2010–present

Career history
- 2010–2011: Telekom Baskets Bonn
- 2011–2012: STB Le Havre
- 2012: Juvecaserta Basket
- 2013: Rosa Radom
- 2013–2014: Akhisar Belediyespor
- 2014: İstanbul Teknik Üniversitesi
- 2015: KB Peja

Career highlights
- First-team All-Pac-10 (2010); Second-team All-Pac-10 (2009); Co-Texas Mr. Basketball (2006)

Dominique Giovanni "Nic" Wise (born September 8, 1987) is an American professional basketball player who last played for KB Peja of the Siguria Superleague.

== High school ==
At Kingwood High School, Nic Wise was a two-year letterwinner. He played his freshman year of high school at Cinco Ranch High School in Katy. The following year, he played under his father at Hightower High School. His high school junior year he then went to Westfield High School and quickly left when playing time was in question. He then transferred to Kingwood High School and finished his career with a record of 131–23 (.851), the most wins by any player in Texas Class 5A history. He averaged 19.0 points, 8.0 assists, 6.0 rebounds, and 4.0 steals per contest.

Wise led Kingwood to the Texas Class 5A State Championship game in two straight years, which resulted in a state title to finish his junior year by defeating DeSoto High School, and a loss in his senior year in an overtime game to Plano Senior High School. He was ranked the 26th best high school prospect and the 4th best point guard in the nation by Bob Gibbons's All-Star sports Top 100.

== Collegiate career ==
Nic Wise played four years for the Arizona Wildcats. During his junior year, Wise was named to the All-Pac-10 Second Team. In his senior campaign, Wise was selected to the All-Pac-10 First Team and the NABC All District 20 Team.

== Professional career ==
In July 2010, Wise was signed by the Telekom Baskets Bonn of Germany for the 2010–11 season.

In August 2011 he signed a one-year deal with STB Le Havre of the LNB Pro A.

On July 12, 2012, he signed with Juvecaserta Basket of Italy. On October 16, 2012, he parted ways with Juvecaserta after playing only three games in Serie A. In January 2013, he signed with Rosa Radom of the Polish Basketball League for the rest of the 2012–13 season.

In August 2013, he signed with Akhisar Belediye of the Turkish Basketball Second League.

On March 1, 2015, he signed with KB Peja of the Siguria Superleague.

== NCAA career statistics ==
Legend
GP	Games played	GS	Games started	MPG	Minutes per game
FG%	Field goal percentage	3P%	3-point field goal percentage	FT%	Free throw percentage
RPG	Rebounds per game	APG	Assists per game	SPG	Steals per game
BPG	Blocks per game	PPG	Points per game	**Bold**	Career high

Year	Team	GP	GS	MPG	FG%	3P%	FT%	RPG	APG	SPG	BPG	PPG
2006–07	Arizona	22	...	8.2	.255	.233	.688	.5	.5	.3	0.0	1.9
2007–08	Arizona	27	...	29.4	.451	**.481**	.768	2.3	4.4	**2.0**	**0.1**	9.2
2008–09	Arizona	**35**	...	**36.4**	**.452**	.415	. 848	2.5	**4.6**	1.5	**0.1**	**15.7**
2009–10	Arizona	31	...	32.9	.386	.360	**.878**	**3.3**	3.3	1.7	**0.1**	14.4
