= Quincy Pondexter =

American basketball player and coach (born 1988)

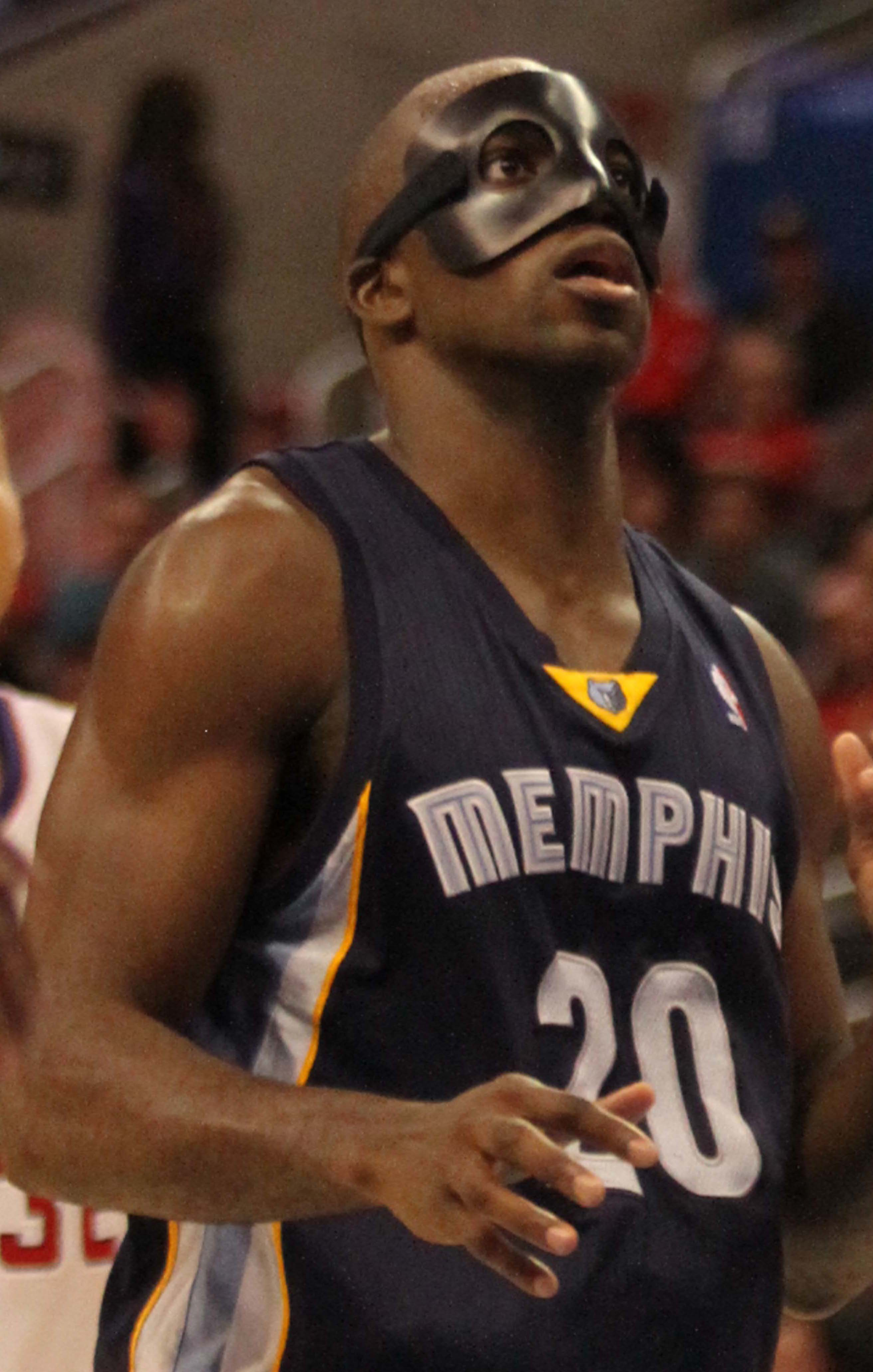
- Pondexter with the Memphis Grizzlies in 2013, wearing a protective mask

Windy City Bulls
- Title: Head coach
- League: NBA G League

Personal information
- Born: March 10, 1988 (age 38) Fresno, California, U.S.
- Listed height: 6 ft 7 in (2.01 m)
- Listed weight: 230 lb (104 kg)

Career information
- High school: San Joaquin Memorial (Fresno, California)
- College: Washington (2006–2010)
- NBA draft: 2010: 1st round, 26th overall pick
- Drafted by: Oklahoma City Thunder
- Playing career: 2010–2019
- Position: Small forward / shooting guard
- Number: 20, 8, 3
- Coaching career: 2021–present

Career history

Playing
- 2010–2011: New Orleans Hornets
- 2011–2015: Memphis Grizzlies
- 2015–2017: New Orleans Pelicans
- 2017–2018: Chicago Bulls
- 2018–2019: San Antonio Spurs

Coaching
- 2021–2024: Washington (assistant)
- 2024–2025: USC (assistant)
- 2025–2026: Washington (assistant)
- 2026–present: Windy City Bulls

Career highlights
- First-team All-Pac-10 (2010)
- Stats at NBA.com
- Stats at Basketball Reference
Medals
Men's basketball
Representing United States
Summer Universiade
Bronze medal – third place	2009 Belgrade	Team competition

Quincy Coe Pondexter (born March 10, 1988) is an American basketball coach and former professional player, who serves as the head coach for the Windy City Bulls of the NBA G League. He played high school basketball in Fresno, California, at San Joaquin Memorial High School. Pondexter played four years of college basketball for the Washington Huskies. At the end of his senior season, he earned first-team All-Pac-10 honors and an All-American honorable mention by the Associated Press.

== Early life ==
Pondexter was born on March 10, 1988, in Fresno, California. As a high school senior, Pondexter was a highly sought after recruit, rated five stars and the 16th best prospect in the 2006 class by Scout.com. Pondexter eventually signed a letter-of-intent with the University of Washington, over scholarship offers from Arizona, Connecticut, and Memphis. Washington's 2006 recruiting class of Pondexter, Spencer Hawes, Adrian Oliver, and Phil Nelson was rated amongst the top in the country. They were ranked sixth overall by Scout.com, and eighth overall by Rivals.com. As a Senior, He would average 21.5 points, 6.1 rebounds and 1.6 steals.

== College career ==
=== Freshman season ===
As a freshman, Pondexter was selected as a starter in his first collegiate game at Washington, scoring 21 points and grabbing 7 rebounds in a 99–91 win against Pepperdine. After a hot start, Pondexter endured struggles and fell in the Huskies rotation. However, Pondexter once again began seeing increased playing time near the end of the season, in which the Huskies won 3 of their final 4 games, including wins over #24 USC and #2 UCLA. Pondexter finished his freshman season as an honorable mention on the Pac-10 All-Freshman team. His 10.7 ppg was the fourth highest scoring average for a Washington freshman in school history.

=== Sophomore season ===
At the beginning of his sophomore season, Pondexter regained his spot in the starting lineup. However, seven games into the season he lost his starting position and once again began to slide in the Huskies rotation. Mid-season, fellow sophomore Oliver announced his intention to transfer to San Jose State. The departure of Oliver, paired with the loss of Hawes to the 2007 NBA draft and off-season transfer of Nelson to Portland State left Pondexter as the last remaining member of the previously heralded 2006 recruiting class. Reflecting on his difficult sophomore season and the departure of his classmates, Pondexter said in 2009, "It was really tough my sophomore year. People bond with people in their recruiting class: you come in together, you’re friends. And I was kind of alone sometimes. It was a heart-breaking year for me to see everyone go."

Pondexter's sophomore struggles extended throughout most of the season, and his scoring average dropped from the previous season to 9.9 ppg. Near the end of the season Pondexter was able to show glimpses of the promise he showed early in his freshman season, averaging 15.2 points and 6.4 rebounds in the final five games of his sophomore season. Following the season, Pondexter won the school's "Industrial Award" as the hardest worker on the team.

=== Junior season ===
Prior to his junior season, Pondexter was selected as a captain along with senior teammates Jon Brockman and Justin Dentmon. The 2008–2009 season got off to a disappointing start, as Washington was upset by Portland in the season opener 80–74. In the loss, Pondexter failed to register a point. The source of some initial frustration from Washington fans, Pondexter steadily improved throughout the season as the Huskies climbed to the top of the Pac-10 conference standings. Pondexter lead Washington to a 60-51 road victory over USC, leading the Huskies with 22 points and 5 rebounds. In a key game against co-leader Arizona State, Pondexter delivered a double-double of 10 points and 12 rebounds in the Huskies 73–70 overtime victory. The victory put Washington in position to claim their first outright Pac-10 conference title since 1953. One week after the victory against Arizona State, Washington defeated rival Washington State 67–60 to win the conference title. In the clinching game, Pondexter led the Huskies in scoring with 16 points. Washington finished the season ranked 10th, and earned a 4 seed in the 2009 NCAA Tournament. In Washington's first-round game against Mississippi State, Pondexter lead the team to a 71–58 victory by scoring 23 points and grabbing 7 rebounds. Washington was eliminated in the second round by fifth-seeded Purdue, losing 76–74. In the loss Pondexter delivered a double-double, scoring 20 points and grabbing 10 rebounds.

=== Senior season ===
Prior to his senior season, Pondexter participated in the World University Games, helping the USA claim a bronze medal. Pondexter was once again elected captain of the Huskies. Pondexter was expected to replace the production of Jon Brockman, who had graduated following the 2009 season and was selected by the Sacramento Kings in the 2009 NBA draft. Pondexter started the season hot, scoring 25 points and grabbing 11 rebounds for the Huskies in a 96–78 victory over Belmont. In the fourth game of the season, the Huskies defeated San Jose State, who were led by former Husky player Adrian Oliver. Following the 80–70 victory in which Pondexter scored 30 points and totaled 15 rebounds, Pondexter said of Oliver, "Adrian, he got what he wanted. He got a school where he can score as many points as he wants. But we’re winning games. He scored 32, I got the win."

Pondexter would have a successful senior season, averaging 19.3 points and 7.4 rebounds. Pondexter won the Pac-10 Conference Player of the Week five times throughout the 2009–2010 season. At the conclusion of the season Pondexter finished second to Cal's Jerome Randle for Pac-10 Player of the Year, becoming the first Pac-10 player not to win the award despite winning the Player of the Week award five times. However, Pondexter led Washington over Randle's Golden Bears in the 2010 Pac-10 Tournament Championship in a 79–75 victory. Pondexter led the Huskies with 18 points, and clinched an automatic berth for Washington in the 2010 NCAA Tournament.

Washington was awarded an #11 seed, and a first round matchup against #6 seed Marquette. In a back-and-forth game, Pondexter banked in the game winning shot with 1.7 seconds remaining to lead the Huskies to an 80–78 upset victory over the Golden Eagles. The shot capped an 18-point, 11 rebound game for Pondexter, and advanced Washington to a second round matchup against the #3 seeded New Mexico Lobos. Washington upset New Mexico 82–64, with Pondexter scoring 18 points to lead the Huskies to the Sweet 16 for the first time since 2005–2006.

Pondexter concluded his Washington career as the all-time leader in career games played and career home wins. Pondexter finished as the 3rd highest scoring player in school history with 1,786 points.

=== College statistics ===
Year	Team	GP	GS	MPG	FG%	3P%	FT%	RPG	APG	SPG	BPG	PPG
2006–07	Washington	32	22	23.9	.498	.375	.760	4.0	1.5	.7	.2	10.7
2007–08	Washington	33	9	24.4	.452	.288	.685	4.8	1.9	.5	.2	9.9
2008–09	Washington	35	35	28.1	.511	.214	.742	5.9	1.6	.7	.4	12.1
2009–10	Washington	36	36	32.3	.528	.353	.827	7.4	1.8	1.3	.6	19.3
Career		136	102	27.3	.503	.327	.768	5.6	1.7	.8	.3	13.1

=== Honors ===
- First Team All-Pac 10
- Pac-10 Player of the Week five times in 2009–10 (Pac-10 Record)
- NABC All-District 24 First Team
- Pac-10 All Tournament Team
- FoxSports.com All-American Fourth Team
- USBWA All-District Team
- Member of Team USA's 2009 Team World University Games bronze medal team

== Professional career ==
=== New Orleans Hornets (2010–2011) ===
On June 24, 2010, Pondexter was selected by the Oklahoma City Thunder with the 26th overall pick in the 2010 NBA draft. On July 8, 2010, the New Orleans Hornets acquired the rights to Pondexter and Craig Brackins in exchange for the rights to Cole Aldrich and Morris Peterson.

=== Memphis Grizzlies (2011–2017) ===
On December 24, 2011, one day before the start of the 2011–12 NBA season, the Hornets traded Pondexter to the Memphis Grizzlies in exchange for Greivis Vásquez.

On October 31, 2013, Pondexter signed a four-year, $14 million contract extension with the Grizzlies.

After appearing in a 189 games over his first three seasons in the NBA, injury struck him down during the 2013–14 season. On December 9, 2013, Pondexter was ruled out indefinitely after he was diagnosed with a tarsal navicular stress fracture in his right foot. He subsequently missed the rest of the season after undergoing surgery on December 20.

Pondexter returned for the 2014–15 season and played out the first two months of the season with Memphis. On January 12, 2015, he was traded back to New Orleans, now known as the Pelicans, in a three-team deal that involved the Grizzlies and the Boston Celtics. He enjoyed a career-best tenure with the Pelicans during the second half of the 2014–15 season, averaging 9.0 points per game and registering a career-high 25 points in a 102–96 win over the Brooklyn Nets on February 25, 2015. However, injury struck him down again following the Pelicans' 2015 playoff run.

On May 6, 2015, Pondexter underwent successful arthroscopic surgery on his left knee. Pondexter was slated to return in November 2015, but after undergoing another round of left knee surgery on January 20, 2016, he was ruled out for the entire 2015–16 season. He was expected to make a full recovery for the 2016–17 season, but he failed to appear in a game for the Pelicans for the second straight season after undergoing arthroscopic left knee surgery for a third time on January 4, 2017. Following surgery number three, Pondexter battled the life-threatening skin infection Methicillin-resistant Staphylococcus aureus.

=== Chicago Bulls (2017–2018) ===
On September 1, 2017, Pondexter was traded, along with a 2018 second-round pick and cash considerations, to the Chicago Bulls in exchange for the draft rights to Ater Majok. Despite missing all of preseason with a strained left hamstring, Pondexter played for the first time since April 2015 in the Bulls' 2017–18 season opener on October 19, 2017, against the Toronto Raptors. On February 1, 2018, he was waived by the Bulls.

=== San Antonio Spurs (2018–2019) ===
On August 29, 2018, Pondexter signed a one-year contract with the San Antonio Spurs. He played under head coach Gregg Popovich who he considered to be "the greatest coach of all time."

== Coaching career ==
On May 3, 2021, Pondexter returned to the Washington Huskies as an assistant under head coach Mike Hopkins.

On May 16, 2024, Pondexter was announced as an assistant coach for the USC Trojans under incoming head coach Eric Musselman. He rejoined the coaching staff at Washington before the start of the 2025–26 season.

On August 25, 2026, Pondexter was hired by the Chicago Bulls to be the new head coach of their NBA G League affiliate team, the Windy City Bulls.

== NBA career statistics ==
Legend
GP	Games played	GS	Games started	MPG	Minutes per game
FG%	Field goal percentage	3P%	3-point field goal percentage	FT%	Free throw percentage
RPG	Rebounds per game	APG	Assists per game	SPG	Steals per game
BPG	Blocks per game	PPG	Points per game	**Bold**	Career high

=== Regular season ===
Year	Team	GP	GS	MPG	FG%	3P%	FT%	RPG	APG	SPG	BPG	PPG
2010–11	New Orleans	**66**	6	11.1	.406	.360	.706	1.3	.4	.3	.2	2.8
2011–12	Memphis	64	8	15.7	.452	.301	.623	2.0	.4	.4	.1	4.2
2012–13	Memphis	59	1	21.1	.428	.395	.787	2.2	1.0	**.6**	.1	6.4
2013–14	Memphis	15	2	18.0	.392	.324	.808	1.7	1.3	.3	.1	6.3
2014–15	Memphis	30	2	18.0	.356	.233	.700	1.9	.9	.2	.2	4.5
2014–15	New Orleans	45	**28**	**27.8**	.449	**.433**	.758	**3.1**	**1.5**	.3	**.4**	**9.0**
2017–18	Chicago	23	1	8.5	.286	.136	**.824**	1.2	.4	.3	.1	2.0
2018–19	San Antonio	53	0	5.5	**.500**	.333	.810	.9	.5	.2	.0	1.8
Career		355	48	15.6	.423	.356	.746	1.8	.7	.3	.1	4.5

=== Playoffs ===
Year	Team	GP	GS	MPG	FG%	3P%	FT%	RPG	APG	SPG	BPG	PPG
2011	New Orleans	3	0	3.0	.167	.000	–	.3	.3	.0	.0	.7
2012	Memphis	7	0	16.3	**.667**	**.500**	.778	2.3	.3	.6	.0	4.7
2013	Memphis	**15**	0	23.8	.489	.453	.607	2.5	.7	.7	**.1**	**8.9**
2015	New Orleans	4	**4**	**31.0**	.357	.300	**.857**	**5.0**	**3.0**	**1.8**	.0	7.3
2019	San Antonio	5	0	2.4	.000	.000	–	.2	.4	.2	.0	.0
Career		34	4	18.1	.466	.408	.682	2.2	.8	.7	.1	5.8

== Personal life ==
Pondexter's father, Roscoe, was a third-round pick of the Boston Celtics in the 1974 NBA draft and played professional basketball overseas. He is the nephew of former Chicago Bulls player Cliff Pondexter. Pondexter's cousin, Deshon Taylor, has played basketball professionally overseas. Another cousin, Wesley Yates III, played for the Washington Huskies when Pondexter was an assistant and followed him to USC.

Pondexter holds an annual basketball camp in the San Joaquin Valley for boys and girls in kindergarten through 12th grade.
