= Ty Abbott =

American basketball player (born 1988)

Los Angeles Lakers
- Title: Assistant coach
- League: NBA

Personal information
- Born: August 19, 1988 (age 38) Phoenix, Arizona, U.S.
- Listed height: 6 ft 3 in (1.91 m)
- Listed weight: 209 lb (95 kg)

Career information
- High school: Desert Vista (Phoenix, Arizona)
- College: Arizona State (2007–2011)
- NBA draft: 2011: undrafted
- Playing career: 2011–2018
- Position: Shooting guard

Career history
- 2012–2014: BC Kalev
- 2014: Fulgor Libertas Forlì
- 2014–2015: Eskişehir Basket
- 2015: Nea Kifissia
- 2015: Pallacanestro Chieti
- 2015–2016: Universo Treviso
- 2016–2017: Doxa Lefkadas
- 2017–2018: Delaware 87ers
- 2018: Rayos de Hermosillo

Career highlights
- 2× Estonian League champion (2013, 2014); First-team All-Pac-12 (2010)

Tyshawn Abbott (born August 19, 1988, in Phoenix, Arizona) is an American former professional basketball player who last played for the Rayos de Hermosillo of the CIBACOPA. He had played college basketball at Arizona State.

== High school career ==
Abbott played high school basketball at Desert Vista in Phoenix.

He averaged 17.3 points per game in his senior year leading Desert Vista to a 29–2 overall record and a 5A Division I semifinal appearance and averaged 17 points and nine boards in junior season as team was 26–7.

== College career ==
Abbott played college basketball for Sun Devils men's basketball at Arizona State University from 2007 to 2011.

== Professional career ==
After going undrafted in the 2011 NBA draft, Abbott joined Kalev/Cramo of the Estonian League. He led his team at two league championships during the two years that he stayed at the team. On September 18, 2014, he signed with Fulgor Libertas Forlì. In December that year, Abbott left Forlì and joined Eskişehir Basket of the Turkish Basket League until the end of the season. On January 28, 2015, Abbott joined Nea Kifissia of the Greek Basket League. The next season, he signed in Italy with Pallacanestro Chieti of the Serie A2.

On December 4, 2015, he joined Universo Treviso replacing La'Marshall Corbett on the team's squad. On December 22, 2016, he signed until the end of the season with the Greek team Doxa Lefkadas of the Greek Basket League.

On October 23, 2017, Abbott signed with the Delaware 87ers of the NBA G League, where he averaged 6.3 points, 1.7 rebounds and 2.1 assists in 39 games. After the season ended, he signed with Rayos de Hermosillo of the Mexican CIBACOPA on March 16, 2018.

== Coaching career ==
In September 2018, Abbott was hired by the Delaware Blue Coats as manager of player development. In November 2020, Abbott joined the Chicago Bulls as a player development coordinator. In August 2024, Abbott was hired by the Los Angeles Lakers as their lead player development coach.

In May 2025, Abbott was named a coach of the Adidas Eurocamp held in Treviso, Italy.
