= 2006–07 Iowa State Cyclones men's basketball team =

American college basketball season

2006–07 Iowa State Cyclones men's basketball
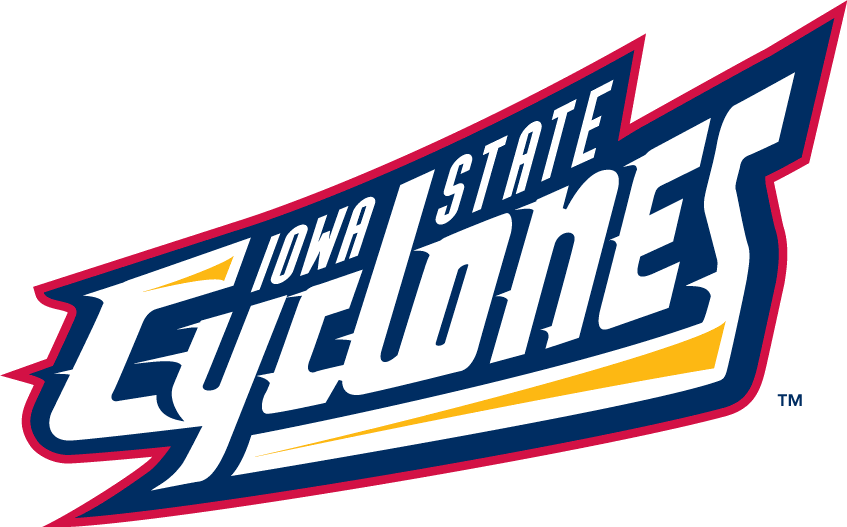
- Conference: Big 12 Conference
- Record: 15-16 (6-10 Big 12)
- Head coach: Greg McDermott (1st season)
- Assistant coaches: T.J. Otzelberger (1st season); Jeff Rutter; Jean Prioleau
- Home arena: Hilton Coliseum

2006–07 Big 12 men's basketball standings
	Conf.				Overall
Team	W		L	PCT	W		L	PCT
No. 2 Kansas †	14	–	2	.875	33	–	5	.868
No. 9 Texas A&M	13	–	3	.813	27	–	7	.794
No. 11 Texas	12	–	4	.750	25	–	10	.714
Kansas State	10	–	6	.625	23	–	12	.657
Texas Tech	9	–	7	.563	21	–	13	.618
Missouri	7	–	9	.438	18	–	12	.600
Oklahoma State	6	–	10	.375	22	–	13	.629
Iowa State	6	–	10	.375	15	–	16	.484
Oklahoma	6	–	10	.375	16	–	15	.516
Nebraska	6	–	10	.375	17	–	14	.548
Baylor	4	–	12	.250	15	–	16	.484
Colorado	3	–	13	.188	7	–	20	.259
† 2007 Big 12 Tournament winner Rankings from AP poll

The 2006–07 Iowa State Cyclones men's basketball team represented Iowa State University during the 2006–07 NCAA Division I men's basketball season. The Cyclones were coached by Greg McDermott, who was in his first season. They played their home games at Hilton Coliseum in Ames, Iowa and competed in the Big 12 Conference.

== Previous season ==
The Cyclones finished 16–14, 6–10 in Big 12 play to finish 8th the regular season conference standings. They lost to Colorado in the first round of the Big 12 tournament.

On March 17, 2006, it was announced that Wayne Morgan and his staff would be fired by the university. Lack of results played into the decision, and there were other contributing factors. While Morgan was a high-level recruiter, on the court, success did not follow. In addition, Morgan and his staff had used a company called D1 Scheduling to schedule games in previous seasons. There were allegations that money was being exchanged for recruits.

On March 21, 2006, it was announced that Greg McDermott, then head coach of the UNI Panthers, would be hired as head coach of the Cyclones.

=== Offseason departures ===
Offseason departures
Name	Position	Reason
Wayne Morgan	Head coach	Fired
Curtis Stinson	Guard	Declared for NBA draft
Will Blalock	Guard	Declared for NBA draft
Shawn Taggart	Forward	Transferred to Memphis
Tasheed Carr	Guard	Transferred to St. Joseph's
Mike Evanovich	Forward	Transferred to Fairfield
Farnold Degand	Guard	Transferred to North Carolina State
John Neal	Guard	Graduated
Anthony Davis	Forward	Graduated

== Recruiting ==
College recruiting
Name	Hometown	School	Height	Weight	Commit date
Corey McIntosh; PG	Fullerton, California	Fullerton College	5 ft 11 in (1.80 m)	170 lb (77 kg)	Jun 30, 2006
Corey McIntosh; PG	Recruit ratings: Rivals: 247Sports:				
Dodie Dunson; PG	Bloomington, Illinois	Brewster Academy	6 ft 2 in (1.88 m)	185 lb (84 kg)	Apr 9, 2006
Dodie Dunson; PG	Recruit ratings: Scout: Rivals: 247Sports:				
Mike Taylor; SG	Milwaukee	Chipola College	6 ft 2 in (1.88 m)	175 lb (79 kg)	Apr 7, 2006
Mike Taylor; SG	Recruit ratings: Rivals: 247Sports:				
Cory Johnson; SF	Duluth, Minnesota	Duluth East	6 ft 7 in (2.01 m)	213 lb (97 kg)	Jun 29, 2005
Cory Johnson; SF	Recruit ratings: Scout: Rivals: 247Sports:				
Wesley Johnson; PF	Corsicana, Texas	Corsicana	6 ft 7 in (2.01 m)	190 lb (86 kg)	Apr 27, 2006
Wesley Johnson; PF	Recruit ratings: Scout: Rivals: 247Sports:				
Overall recruit ranking: 247Sports: 70
Note: In many cases, Scout, Rivals, 247Sports, On3, and ESPN may conflict in their listings of height and weight.; In these cases, the average was taken. ESPN grades are on a 100-point scale.; Sources: "Iowa State 2006 Basketball Commitments". Rivals.; "2006 Iowa State Basketball Commits". Scout.; "ESPN". ESPN.; "Scout.com Team Recruiting Rankings". Scout.; "2006 Team Ranking". Rivals.

== Roster ==
2006–07 Iowa State Cyclones men's basketball team
Players
Coaches

Pos.	#	Name	Height	Weight	Year	Previous school	Hometown
G	1	Dodie Dunson	6 ft 2 in (1.88 m)	190 lb (86 kg)	Fr	Brewster Academy	Bloomington, Illinois
G	2	Brock Jacobson	6 ft 2 in (1.88 m)	185 lb (84 kg)	RS Fr	Webster City High	Webster City, Iowa
G	3	Corey McIntosh	6 ft 0 in (1.83 m)	160 lb (73 kg)	Jr	Fullerton College	West Covina, California
F	4	Wesley Johnson	6 ft 7 in (2.01 m)	195 lb (88 kg)	Fr	Corsicana, Texas	Corsicana
G	12	Tyler Norman (W)	6 ft 2 in (1.88 m)	170 lb (77 kg)	Fr	Faith Lutheran	Las Vegas, Nevada
F	13	Rahshon Clark (C)	6 ft 6 in (1.98 m)	190 lb (86 kg)	Jr	Bridgton Academy	Queens, New York
F	15	Alex Thompson (redshirt)	6 ft 10 in (2.08 m)	230 lb (104 kg)	RS Jr	Iowa	Ames, Iowa
G	21	Mark Currie	6 ft 4 in (1.93 m)	205 lb (93 kg)	RS Jr	Nebraska-Omaha	Odebolt, Iowa
G	23	Chris Ceaser	6 ft 3 in (1.91 m)	185 lb (84 kg)	Sr	Nimitz High	Humble, Texas
G	24	Mike Taylor	6 ft 2 in (1.88 m)	165 lb (75 kg)	Jr	Chipola College	Milwaukee
F	25	Jessan Gray	6 ft 10 in (2.08 m)	200 lb (91 kg)	Sr	Tyler JC	Davenport, Iowa
F	31	Cory Johnson	6 ft 7 in (2.01 m)	230 lb (104 kg)	Fr	Duluth East	Duluth, Minnesota
C	33	Jiri Hubalek	6 ft 11 in (2.11 m)	205 lb (93 kg)	RS Jr	Marshalltown CC	Prague
F	34	Jeff Bergstrom	6 ft 4 in (1.93 m)	190 lb (86 kg)	Sr	Kingwood High	Kingwood, Texas
C	40	Ross Marsden	6 ft 10 in (2.08 m)	210 lb (95 kg)	So	Ames High	Ames, Iowa
F	43	Dustin Streff	6 ft 7 in (2.01 m)	245 lb (111 kg)	RS Sr	NIACC	Orange City, Iowa
F	52	Mike Smith	6 ft 8 in (2.03 m)	220 lb (100 kg)	Jr	Iowa Central CC	Runnells, Iowa

Head coach

- Greg McDermott (Northern Iowa)

Assistant coach(es)

- T.J. Otzelberger (UW–Whitewater)
- Jeff Rutter (Winona State)
- Jean Prioleau (Fordham)

Legend

- (C) Team captain
- (S) Suspended
- (I) Ineligible
- (W) Walk-on
- Injured
- Current redshirt

== Schedule and results ==
Date time, TV	Rank^{#}	Opponent^{#}	Result	Record	Site city, state
Exhibition
November 3, 2006*; 7:00 pm, Cyclones.com		EA Sports; Exhibition	W 58-57		Hilton Coliseum; Ames, Iowa
November 6, 2006*; 7:00 pm, Cyclones.com		Wayne State; Exhibition	W 55-41		Hilton Coliseum; Ames, Iowa
Regular season
November 10, 2006*; 8:00 pm, Mediacom		UC-Riverside; Cyclone Challenge	W 69-61	1-0	Hilton Coliseum; Ames, Iowa
November 11, 2006*; 8:00 pm, Mediacom		Louisiana–Monroe; Cyclone Challenge	W 68-40	2-0	Hilton Coliseum; Ames, Iowa
November 12, 2006*; 2:30 pm, Mediacom		Eastern Illinois; Cyclone Challenge	W 56-54	3-0	Hilton Coliseum; Ames, Iowa
November 19, 2006*; 1:00 pm, Mediacom		Norfolk State	W 57-49	4-0	Hilton Coliseum; Ames, Iowa
November 21, 2006*; 7:00 pm, Cyclone Television Network		at Minnesota	W 68-63	5-0	Williams Arena; Minneapolis
November 25, 2006*; 7:00 pm, Mediacom		Lake Superior State	W 90-61	6-0	Hilton Coliseum; Ames, Iowa
November 29, 2006*; 7:00 pm, KFXA/KDSM		at UNI; Iowa Big Four	L 57-70	6-1	McLeod Center; Cedar Falls, Iowa
December 3, 2006*; 1:00 pm, Cyclone Television Network		Drake; Iowa Big Four	L 78-80	6-2	Hilton Coliseum; Ames, Iowa
December 8, 2006*; 7:00 pm, ESPN Plus/ESPNU		at Iowa; Hy-Vee Cy-Hawk Series	L 59-77	6-3	Carver–Hawkeye Arena; Iowa City, Iowa
December 13, 2006*; 7:00 pm, Mediacom		Savannah State	W 70-59	7-3	Hilton Coliseum; Ames, Iowa
December 16, 2006*; 2:00 pm, ESPN2		vs. Bradley; Mediacom Cyclone Capital Classic	L 66-76	7-4	Wells Fargo Arena; Des Moines, Iowa
December 19, 2006*; 7:00 pm, Cyclone Television Network		at No. 3 Ohio State	L 56-75	7-5	Value City Arena; Columbus, Ohio
December 23, 2006*; 1:00 pm, Mediacom		SE Missouri State	W 87-71	8-5	Hilton Coliseum; Ames, Iowa
December 31, 2006*; 1:00 pm, Cyclone Television Network		North Dakota State	W 67-54	9-5	Hilton Coliseum; Ames, Iowa
January 6, 2007; 5:00 pm, Cyclone Television Network		at Missouri	W 66-65	10-5 (1-0)	Hearnes Center; Columbia, Missouri
January 10, 2007; 7:00 pm, Cyclone Television Network		Nebraska	W 71-62	11-5 (2-0)	Hilton Coliseum; Ames, Iowa
January 13, 2007; 1:00 pm, ESPN		No. 6 Kansas	L 64-68 ^{OT}	11-6 (2-1)	Hilton Coliseum; Ames, Iowa
January 17, 2007; 8:00 pm, Cyclone Television Network		at Colorado	L 65-74	11-7 (2-2)	Coors Events Center; Boulder, Colorado
January 20, 2007; 12:45 pm, ESPN Plus		Kansas State	L 60-69	11-8 (2-3)	Hilton Coliseum; Ames, Iowa
January 27, 2007; 7:00 pm, ESPN Plus		at No. 13 Oklahoma State	L 50-62	11-9 (2-4)	Gallagher-Iba Arena; Stillwater, Oklahoma
January 31, 2007; 6:30 pm, ESPNU		at No. 10 Texas A&M	L 49-73	11-10 (2-5)	Reed Arena; College Station
February 3, 2007; 5:00 pm, Cyclone Television Network		Baylor	W 71-58	12-10 (3-5)	Hilton Coliseum; Ames, Iowa
February 6, 2007; 7:00 pm, Cyclone Television Network		Missouri	L 55-77	12-11 (3-6)	Hilton Coliseum; Ames, Iowa
February 10, 2007; 12:45 pm, ESPN Plus		at Texas	L 68-77	12-12 (3-7)	Frank Erwin Center; Austin, Texas
February 13, 2007; 7:00 pm, Cyclone Television Network		Oklahoma	W 58-51	13-12 (4-7)	Hilton Coliseum; Ames, Iowa
February 17, 2007; 5:00 pm, ESPN Plus		at Kansas State	L 47-65	13-13 (4-8)	Bramlage Coliseum; Manhattan, Kansas
February 21, 2007; 7:00 pm, Cyclone Television Network		Colorado	W 55-53	14-13 (5-8)	Hilton Coliseum; Ames, Iowa
February 24, 2007; 5:00 pm, ESPN		at No. 6 Kansas	L 52-89	14-14 (5-9)	Allen Fieldhouse; Lawrence, Kansas
February 28, 2007; 7:00 pm, Cyclone Television Network		at Nebraska	W 69-63	15-14 (6-9)	Bob Devaney Sports Center; Lincoln, Nebraska
March 3, 2007; 7:00 pm, ESPN Plus		Texas Tech	L 63-68	15-15 (6-10)	Hilton Coliseum; Ames, Iowa
Big 12 Tournament
March 8, 2007; 11:30 am, ESPN Plus		vs. Oklahoma; Big 12 Tournament First round	L 63-68	15-16 (6-10)	Ford Center; Oklahoma City, Oklahoma
*Non-conference game. ^{#}Rankings from AP poll. (#) Tournament seedings in parentheses. All times are in Central Time.

== Awards and honors ==
- All-Conference Selections

Mike Taylor (basketball) (Honorable Mention)

- Freshman All-American

Mike Taylor (basketball) (2004)

- Academic All-Big 12 First Team

Ross Marsden (2007)
Jeff Bergstrom (2007)

- Ralph A. Olsen Award

Mike Taylor (basketball) (2007)
