= 2006–07 Texas Tech Red Raiders basketball team =

American college basketball season

2006–07 Texas Tech Red Raiders basketball

NCAA Division I men's basketball tournament First round, L 75–84 v. Boston College
- Conference: Big 12 Conference
- South
- Record: 21–13 (9–7 Big 12)
- Head coach: Bob Knight (6th season)
- Assistant coaches: Chris Beard (6th season); Pat Knight (6th season); Stew Robinson (4th season)
- Home arena: United Spirit Arena

2006–07 Big 12 men's basketball standings
	Conf.				Overall
Team	W		L	PCT	W		L	PCT
No. 2 Kansas †	14	–	2	.875	33	–	5	.868
No. 9 Texas A&M	13	–	3	.813	27	–	7	.794
No. 11 Texas	12	–	4	.750	25	–	10	.714
Kansas State	10	–	6	.625	23	–	12	.657
Texas Tech	9	–	7	.563	21	–	13	.618
Missouri	7	–	9	.438	18	–	12	.600
Oklahoma State	6	–	10	.375	22	–	13	.629
Iowa State	6	–	10	.375	15	–	16	.484
Oklahoma	6	–	10	.375	16	–	15	.516
Nebraska	6	–	10	.375	17	–	14	.548
Baylor	4	–	12	.250	15	–	16	.484
Colorado	3	–	13	.188	7	–	20	.259
† 2007 Big 12 Tournament winner Rankings from AP poll

The 2006–07 Texas Tech Red Raiders men's basketball team represented Texas Tech University in the Big 12 Conference during the 2006–07 NCAA Division I men's basketball season. The head coach was Bob Knight, his 6th year with the team. The Red Raiders played their home games in the United Spirit Arena in Lubbock, Texas.

== Roster ==
2006–07 Texas Tech Red Raiders men's basketball team
Players
Coaches

Pos.	#	Name	Height	Weight	Year	Hometown
F	0	Decenase White	6 ft 6 in (1.98 m)	215 lb (98 kg)	Fr	San Francisco, California
G	3	Martin Zeno	6 ft 5 in (1.96 m)	205 lb (93 kg)	Jr	Sulphur, Louisiana
G	5	Benny Valentine	5 ft 7 in (1.7 m)	175 lb (79 kg)	So	Omaha, Nebraska
F	11	Tyler Hoffmeister (W)	6 ft 6 in (1.98 m)	200 lb (91 kg)	Jr	The Woodlands, Texas
F	12	Jay Mitchell	6 ft 9 in (2.06 m)	240 lb (109 kg)	So	La Grange, Georgia
G	20	Alan Voskuil	6 ft 3 in (1.91 m)	181 lb (82 kg)	So	Bedford, Texas
G	22	Jarrius Jackson	6 ft 1 in (1.85 m)	175 lb (79 kg)	Sr	Monroe, Louisiana
F	30	Michael Prince	6 ft 7 in (2.01 m)	208 lb (94 kg)	So	Plano, Texas
F	31	Tanner Ogden	6 ft 7 in (2.01 m)	220 lb (100 kg)	Sr	Seminole, Texas
F	32	Jon Plefka	6 ft 8 in (2.03 m)	245 lb (111 kg)	Sr	New Britain, Connecticut
F	33	Justin Wilkerson	6 ft 8 in (2.03 m)	220 lb (100 kg)	So	Greenville, Texas
G	33	LucQuente White	6 ft 1 in (1.85 m)	176 lb (80 kg)	Sr	Midland, Texas
C	34	Esmir Rizvić	7 ft 0 in (2.13 m)	262 lb (119 kg)	So	Zenica, Bosnia
F	41	Damir Suljagic	6 ft 8 in (2.03 m)	250 lb (113 kg)	So	Tucson, Arizona
G	42	Charlie Burgess	6 ft 1 in (1.85 m)	193 lb (88 kg)	Jr	New York City, New York
G	44	Darryl Dora	6 ft 9 in (2.06 m)	250 lb (113 kg)	Sr	Gonzales, Texas

Head coach

- Bob Knight

Assistant coach(es)

- Chris Beard
- Pat Knight
- Stew Robinson

Legend

- (C) Team captain
- (S) Suspended
- (I) Ineligible
- (W) Walk-on
- Injured
- Current redshirt

Roster
Last update: August 17, 2026

== Schedule ==
Date time, TV	Rank^{#}	Opponent^{#}	Result	Record	Site (attendance) city, state
Regular Season
November 11, 2006*; 1:00 p.m.		Sam Houston	W 79–64	1–0	United Spirit Arena; Lubbock, Texas
November 13, 2006*; 9:00 p.m.		Gardner–Webb	W 86–74	2–0	United Spirit Arena; Lubbock, Texas
November 14, 2006*; 9:00 p.m.		Little Rock	W 93–59	3–0	United Spirit Arena; Lubbock, Texas
November 17, 2006*; 7:00 p.m.		North Dakota State	W 85–81	4–0	United Spirit Arena; Lubbock, Texas
November 20, 2006*; 8:30 p.m.		vs. No. 13 Marquette; CBE Classic	L 72–87	4–1	Municipal Auditorium; Kansas City, Missouri
November 21, 2006*; 7:00 p.m.		vs. Air Force; CBE Classic	L 53–67	4–2	Municipal Auditorium; Kansas City, Missouri
November 25, 2006*; 2:00 p.m.		at UTEP	W 94–77	5–2	Don Haskins Center; El Paso, Texas
November 29, 2006*; 7:00 p.m.		at TCU	W 70–60	6–2	Daniel–Meyer Coliseum; Fort Worth, Texas
December 3, 2006*; 5:30 p.m.		vs. Stanford; Pete Newell Classic	L 59–70	6–3	HP Pavilion; San Jose, California
December 6, 2006*; 7:00 p.m.		at Louisiana Tech	W 66–59	7–3	Thomas Assembly Center; Ruston, Louisiana
December 9, 2006*; 1:00 p.m.		Centenary	W 98–64	8–3	United Spirit Arena; Lubbock, Texas
December 16, 2006*; 1:00 p.m.		vs. Arkansas	W 71–56	9–3	Alltell Arena; Little Rock, Arkansas
December 23, 2006*; 3:30 p.m.		Bucknell	W 72–60	10–3	United Spirit Arena; Lubbock, Texas
December 28, 2006*; 8:00 p.m.		UNLV	L 66–74	10–4	United Spirit Arena; Lubbock, Texas
January 1, 2007*; 11:00 a.m.		New Mexico	W 70–68	11–4	United Spirit Arena; Lubbock, Texas
January 6, 2007; 12:30 p.m.		Oklahoma	W 68–54	12–4	United Spirit Arena; Lubbock, Texas
January 8, 2007; 9:00 p.m.		at Kansas State	W 62–52	13–4	Bramlage Coliseum; Manhattan, Kansas
January 13, 2007; 3:00 p.m.		at Baylor	L 70–73	13–5	Ferrell Center; Waco, Texas
January 20, 2007; 3:00 p.m.		No. 5 Kansas	W 69–64	14–5	United Spirit Arena; Lubbock, Texas
January 24, 2007; 7:00 p.m.		No. 6 Texas A&M	W 70–68	15–5	United Spirit Arena; Lubbock, Texas
January 27, 2007; 3:00 p.m.		at Missouri	L 58–71	15–6	Mizzou Arena; Columbia, Missouri
January 31, 2007; 8:00 p.m.		No. 22 Texas	L 64–76	15–7	United Spirit Arena; Lubbock, Texas
February 3, 2007; 7:00 p.m.		at Oklahoma	L 61–75	15–8	Lloyd Noble Center; Norman, Oklahoma
February 6, 2007; 7:00 p.m.		Nebraska	L 59–61	15–9	United Spirit Arena; Lubbock, Texas
February 10, 2007; 3:00 p.m.		at No. 17 Oklahoma State	L 91–93 ^{2OT}	15–10	Gallagher-Iba Arena; Stillwater, Oklahoma
February 13, 2007; 6:00 p.m.		at No. 6 Texas A&M	W 77–75	16–10	Reed Arena; College Station, Texas
February 17, 2007; 6:30 p.m.		Colorado	W 95–74	17–10	United Spirit Arena; Lubbock, Texas
February 20, 2007; 8:00 p.m.		at No. 19 Texas	L 51–80	17–11	Frank Erwin Center; Austin, Texas
February 24, 2007; 11:00 a.m.		Oklahoma State	W 59–57	18–11	United Spirit Arena; Lubbock, Texas
February 28, 2007; 7:00 p.m.		Baylor	W 85–74	19–11	United Spirit Arena; Lubbock, Texas
March 3, 2007; 7:00 p.m.		Iowa State	W 63–61	20–11	United Spirit Arena; Lubbock, Texas
Big 12 tournament
March 8, 2007; 2:00 p.m.	(5)	vs. (12) Colorado; First Round	W 81–71	21–11	Ford Center; Oklahoma City, Oklahoma
March 9, 2007; 2:00 p.m.	(5)	vs. (4) Kansas State; Quarterfinals	L 45–66	21–12	Ford Center; Oklahoma City, Oklahoma
NCAA Tournament
March 15*; 12:25 p.m.	(10 W)	vs. (7 W) Boston College; First Round	L 75–84	21–13	Lawrence Joel Veterans Memorial Coliseum; East Rutherford, New Jersey
*Non-conference game. ^{#}Rankings from AP Poll. (#) Tournament seedings in parentheses. All times are in Central Time.
