= Seminole High School (Texas) =

Location
- 2100 NW Ave D Seminole, Texas 79360-3024; United States

Information
- School type: Public high school
- School district: Seminole Independent School District
- Principal: Erik Kirkpatrick
- Teaching staff: 75.37 (FTE)
- Grades: 9-12
- Enrollment: 836 (2023-2024)
- Student to teacher ratio: 11.09
- Colors: Black & Yellow
- Athletics conference: UIL Class AAAA
- Mascot: Indians & Maidens
- Yearbook: Tepee
- Website: Seminole High School

Seminole High School is a public high school located in Seminole, Texas (USA) and classified as a 4A school by the UIL. It is part of the Seminole Independent School District located in central Gaines County. In 2015, the school was rated "Met Standard" by the Texas Education Agency.

== Academics ==
- UIL Academic Meet Champions
  - 1993(3A), 1994(3A), 2002(3A)

== Athletics ==
The Seminole Indians compete in these sports -

Cross Country, Volleyball, Football, Basketball, Powerlifting, Golf, Tennis, Track, Softball & Baseball

=== State Titles ===
- Boys Basketball -
  - 1955(2A), 1979(2A)
- Boys Track -
  - 1948(1A)
- Volleyball -
  - 1971(3A), 1976(3A), 1977(3A)

==== State Finalists ====
- Baseball -
  - 1962(3A)
- Boys Basketball -
  - 1957(2A), 1963(2A), 1999(3A)
- Volleyball -
  - 1978(3A), 1979(2A), 1982(3A), 1983(3A)

== Band ==
- Marching Band Swepstakes Champions
  - 1981(3A)

== Theater ==
- One Act Play
  - 2014(3A)- Sf Golden Boy, 2015(4A) - The Night Thoreau Spent in Jail, 2016 (4A) - A View From the Bridge

=== State Finalists ===
- 1993(3A) 1994(3A), 1995(3A), 1996(3A), 1997(3A)

== Alumni ==
- Marcus Haddock, opera singer
