= 2006–07 Texas Longhorns men's basketball team =

American college basketball season

2006–07 Texas Longhorns men's basketball

NCAA Tournament, Round of 32
- Conference: Big 12
- South

Ranking
- Coaches: No. 16
- AP: No. 11
- Record: 25-10 (12-4 Big 12)
- Head coach: Rick Barnes
- Home arena: Frank Erwin Center

2006–07 Big 12 men's basketball standings
	Conf.				Overall
Team	W		L	PCT	W		L	PCT
No. 2 Kansas †	14	–	2	.875	33	–	5	.868
No. 9 Texas A&M	13	–	3	.813	27	–	7	.794
No. 11 Texas	12	–	4	.750	25	–	10	.714
Kansas State	10	–	6	.625	23	–	12	.657
Texas Tech	9	–	7	.563	21	–	13	.618
Missouri	7	–	9	.438	18	–	12	.600
Oklahoma State	6	–	10	.375	22	–	13	.629
Iowa State	6	–	10	.375	15	–	16	.484
Oklahoma	6	–	10	.375	16	–	15	.516
Nebraska	6	–	10	.375	17	–	14	.548
Baylor	4	–	12	.250	15	–	16	.484
Colorado	3	–	13	.188	7	–	20	.259
† 2007 Big 12 Tournament winner Rankings from AP poll

The 2006–07 Texas Longhorns men's basketball team represented The University of Texas at Austin in NCAA Division I intercollegiate men's basketball competition as a member of the Big 12 Conference. The 2006–07 team posted a 25–10 record, finished in third place in the Big 12, and reached the second round of the 2007 NCAA tournament. Forward Kevin Durant received unanimous recognition as the National Player of the Year in 2007 as a true freshman; Durant was the first freshman ever to win any of the national player of the year awards.

== Roster ==
	#	Position	Height	Weight	Year	Home Town
A.J. Abrams	3	Point Guard	5–10	155	Sophomore	Austin, Texas
Connor Atchley	32	Center	6–10	225	Sophomore	Clear Lake (Houston), Texas
D. J. Augustin	14	Point Guard	5-11	175	Freshman	Sugar Land, Texas
Kevin Durant	35	Small Forward	6–9	225	Freshman	Rockville, Maryland
Matt Hill	21	Power Forward	6–9	230	Freshman	Lincoln, Nebraska
Damion James	5	Small Forward	6–7	227	Freshman	Nacogdoches, Texas
J.D. Lewis	4	Point Guard	6–1	180	Junior	Amarillo, Texas
Justin Mason	24	Shooting Guard	6–2	185	Freshman	Amarillo, Texas
Dexter Pittman	34	Center	6–10	315	Freshman	Rosenberg, Texas
Harrison Smith	23	Shooting Guard	6–2	185	Freshman	Houston, Texas
Craig Winder	30	Point Guard	6–2	190	Senior	Salisbury, Maryland

== Recruiting ==
College recruiting information
Name	Hometown	School	Height	Weight	Commit date
D. J. Augustin; PG	Sugar Land, Texas	Hightower HS	6 ft 1 in (1.85 m)	170 lb (77 kg)	Nov 7, 2005
D. J. Augustin; PG	Recruit ratings: Scout: Rivals:				
Kevin Durant; SF	Rockville, Maryland	Montrose Christian School	6 ft 9 in (2.06 m)	190 lb (86 kg)	Jun 16, 2005
Kevin Durant; SF	Recruit ratings: Scout: Rivals:				
Matt Hill; C	Lincoln, Nebraska	Lincoln Southeast HS	6 ft 10 in (2.08 m)	220 lb (100 kg)	Oct 24, 2005
Matt Hill; C	Recruit ratings: Scout: Rivals:				
Damion James; SF	Nacogdoches, Texas	Nacogdoches HS	6 ft 8 in (2.03 m)	225 lb (102 kg)	May 22, 2006
Damion James; SF	Recruit ratings: Scout: Rivals:				
Justin Mason; SG	Amarillo, Texas	Palo Duro HS	6 ft 3 in (1.91 m)	175 lb (79 kg)	Jun 29, 2005
Justin Mason; SG	Recruit ratings: Scout: Rivals:				
Dexter Pittman; C	Rosenberg, Texas	B F Terry HS	6 ft 10 in (2.08 m)	320 lb (150 kg)	Oct 18, 2005
Dexter Pittman; C	Recruit ratings: Scout: Rivals:				
Harrison Smith; SG	Houston, Texas	Jones HS	6 ft 3 in (1.91 m)	185 lb (84 kg)	Oct 10, 2005
Harrison Smith; SG	Recruit ratings: Scout: Rivals:				
Overall recruit ranking: Scout: 3 Rivals: 3
Note: In many cases, Scout, Rivals, 247Sports, On3, and ESPN may conflict in their listings of height and weight.; In these cases, the average was taken. ESPN grades are on a 100-point scale.; Sources: "Texas 2006 Basketball Commitments". Rivals.; "2006 Texas Basketball Commits". Scout.; "ESPN". ESPN.; "Scout.com Team Recruiting Rankings". Scout.; "2006 Team Ranking". Rivals.

== Schedule ==
Date time, TV	Rank^{#}	Opponent^{#}	Result	Record	Site (attendance) city, state	
Exhibition games
Tue, Oct 31 7 p.m.	No. 21	Lenoir-Rhyne	Frank Erwin Center • Austin, Texas	W 98–64		(1–0 exhib.)
Mon, Nov 6 7 p.m.	No. 21	Xavier (La.)	Frank Erwin Center • Austin, Texas	W 103–53		(2–0 exhib.)
Regular season
Thu, Nov 9 8:30 p.m. ESPNU	No. 21	Alcorn State	Frank Erwin Center • Austin, Texas (2K Sports College Hoops Classic Regional)	W 103–44	9623	1–0
Fri, Nov 10 8 p.m. ESPNU	No. 21	Chicago State	Frank Erwin Center • Austin, Texas (2K Sports College Hoops Classic Regional)	W 92–66	9918	2–0
Thu, Nov 16 9:30 p.m. ESPN2	No. 19	vs. Michigan State	Madison Square Garden • New York City (2K Sports College Hoops Classic Semifinal Game 2)	L 61–63		2–1
Fri, Nov 17 7 p.m. ESPN2	No. 19	vs. St. John's	Madison Square Garden • New York (2K Sports College Hoops Classic Consolation Game)	W 77–76		3–1
Tue, Nov 21 7 p.m. FSNSW (Texas)		Nicholls State	Frank Erwin Center • Austin, Texas	W 91–60	10474	4–1
Tue, Nov 28 7 p.m. FSNSW (Texas)		Texas Southern	Frank Erwin Center • Austin, Texas	W 90–50	9690	5–1
Sat, Dec 2 1:10 p.m. ESPN		vs. Gonzaga	US Airways Center • Phoenix, Arizona	L 77–87		5–2
Sun, Dec 10 7 p.m. ESPN		vs. No. 9 LSU	Toyota Center • Houston	W 76–75 ^{OT}		6–2
Sat, Dec 16 3 p.m. FSNSW (Texas)		Texas State	Frank Erwin Center • Austin, Texas	W 96–70	10754	7–2
Wed, Dec 20 8 p.m. ESPN2		Arkansas	Frank Erwin Center • Austin, Texas	W 80–76	14451	8–2
Sat, Dec 23 noon ESPN		@ Tennessee	Thompson–Boling Arena • Knoxville, Tennessee	L 105–111 ^{OT}		8–3
Thu, Dec 28 7 p.m. FSNSW (Texas)		Centenary	Frank Erwin Center • Austin, Texas	W 76–66	10913	9–3
Tue, Jan 2 7 p.m. FSNSW (Texas)		Texas-Arlington	Frank Erwin Center • Austin, Texas	W 84–52	9732	10–3
Sat, Jan 6 2:01 p.m. ESPN Plus		@ Colorado*	Coors Events Center • Boulder, Colorado	W 102–78		11–3 (1–0 Big 12)
Wed, Jan 10 7 p.m. FSNSW (Texas)	No. 25	Missouri*	Frank Erwin Center • Austin, Texas	W 88–68	11983	12–3 (2–0)
Sat, Jan 13 2:30 p.m. ABC	No. 25	Oklahoma*	Frank Erwin Center • Austin, Texas	W 80–69	14935	13–3 (3–0)
Tue, Jan 16 8:05 p.m. ESPN2	No. 21	@ No. 12 Oklahoma State*	Gallagher-Iba Arena • Stillwater, Oklahoma	L 103–105 ^{3OT}		13–4 (3–1)
Sat, Jan 20 1:37 p.m. CBS	No. 21	@ Villanova	Wachovia Center • Philadelphia	L 69–76		13–5
Wed, Jan 24 7:05 p.m. FSNSW (Texas)		@ Nebraska*	Devaney Center • Lincoln, Nebraska	W 62–61		14–5 (4–1)
Sat, Jan 27 5 p.m. ESPN2		Baylor*	Frank Erwin Center • Austin, Texas	W 84–79	15256	15–5 (5–1)
Wed, Jan 31 8 p.m. ESPN2	No. 22	@ Texas Tech*	United Spirit Arena • Lubbock, Texas	W 76–64		16–5 (6–1)
Sat, Feb 3 2:30 p.m. ABC	No. 22	Kansas State*	Frank Erwin Center • Austin, Texas	L 72–73	15709	16–6 (6–2)
Mon, Feb 5 8 p.m. ESPN		@ No. 6 Texas A&M*	Reed Arena • College Station, Texas	L 82–100		16–7 (6–3)
Sat, Feb 10 12:47 p.m. ESPN Plus		Iowa State*	Frank Erwin Center • Austin, Texas	W 77–68	14743	17–7 (7–3)
Mon, Feb 12 8 p.m. ESPN		No. 18 Oklahoma State*	Frank Erwin Center • Austin, Texas	W 83–54	15815	18–7 (8–3)
Sat, Feb 17 7 p.m. FSNSW (Texas)		@ Baylor*	Ferrell Center • Waco, Texas	W 68–67		19–7 (9–3)
Tue, Feb 20 8 p.m. ESPN Plus	No. 19	Texas Tech*	Frank Erwin Center • Austin, Texas	W 80–51	16753	20–7 (10–3)
Sat, Feb 24 3 p.m. ESPNU/ ESPN Plus	No. 19	@ Oklahoma*	Lloyd Noble Center • Norman, Oklahoma	W 68–58		21–7 (11–3)
Wed, Feb 28 8 p.m. ESPN2	No. 15	No. 7 Texas A&M*	Frank Erwin Center • Austin, Texas	W 98–96 ^{2OT}	16755	22–7 (12–3)
Sat, Mar 3 11 a.m. CBS	No. 15	@ No. 3 Kansas*	Allen Fieldhouse • Lawrence, Kansas	L 86–90		22–8 (12–4)
2007 Big 12 Conference tournament — No. 3 Seed
Fri, Mar 9 8:20 p.m. ESPN Plus	No. 15	vs. (11) Baylor*	Ford Center • Oklahoma City (Big 12 Conference tournament quarterfinals)	W 74–69		23–8
Sat, Mar 10 3:20 p.m. ESPN2	No. 15	vs. (7) Oklahoma State*	Ford Center • Oklahoma City (Big 12 Conference tournament semifinals)	W 69–64		24–8
Sun, Mar 11 2 p.m. ESPN	No. 15	vs. (1) No. 2 Kansas*	Ford Center • Oklahoma City (Big 12 Conference tournament finals)	L 84–88 ^{OT}		24–9
2007 NCAA tournament — No. 4 Seed
Fri, Mar 16 4:30 p.m. CBS	No. 11 (4 E)	vs. (13) New Mexico State	Spokane Arena • Spokane, Washington (NCAA Tournament first round)	W 79–67		25–9
Sun, Mar 18 2:15 p.m. CBS	No. 11 (4 E)	vs. (5) Southern California	Spokane Arena • Spokane, Washington (NCAA Tournament second round)	L 68–87		25–10
*Big 12 Conference Game. ^{†}All times in Central Standard Time. ^{#}Rank according to Associated Press (AP) Poll. ^{OT} indicates overtime.
