= 2006–07 Kansas State Wildcats men's basketball team =

American college basketball season

2006–07 Kansas State Wildcats men's basketball

Las Vegas Holiday Classic champion

NIT tournament, Second Round
- Conference: Big 12 Conference
- Record: 23–12 (10–6 Big 12)
- Head coach: Bob Huggins
- Assistant coaches: Frank Martin; Dalonte Hill; Erik Martin
- Home arena: Fred Bramlage Coliseum (12,500)

2006–07 Big 12 men's basketball standings
	Conf.				Overall
Team	W		L	PCT	W		L	PCT
No. 2 Kansas †	14	–	2	.875	33	–	5	.868
No. 9 Texas A&M	13	–	3	.813	27	–	7	.794
No. 11 Texas	12	–	4	.750	25	–	10	.714
Kansas State	10	–	6	.625	23	–	12	.657
Texas Tech	9	–	7	.563	21	–	13	.618
Missouri	7	–	9	.438	18	–	12	.600
Oklahoma State	6	–	10	.375	22	–	13	.629
Iowa State	6	–	10	.375	15	–	16	.484
Oklahoma	6	–	10	.375	16	–	15	.516
Nebraska	6	–	10	.375	17	–	14	.548
Baylor	4	–	12	.250	15	–	16	.484
Colorado	3	–	13	.188	7	–	20	.259
† 2007 Big 12 Tournament winner Rankings from AP poll

The 2006–07 Kansas State Wildcats men's basketball team represented Kansas State University in the 2006–07 college basketball season. The team was led by first-year head coach Bob Huggins. It was Huggins' only season at K-State, as he left the following season to coach at his alma mater, West Virginia Mountaineers.

The team concluded the year with a 23–12 (10–6) record, and reached the second round of the NIT tournament in the post-season.

== Roster ==
#	Name	Height	Weight (lbs.)	Position	Class	Hometown	Previous Team(s)
1	Ryan Patzwald	5'11"	190	G	Jr.	Cincinnati, OH, U.S.	Anderson HS
2	Blake Young	6'2"	195	G	Jr.	Orlando, FL, U.S.	Oak Ridge HS; Daytona Beach CC
3	Lance Harris	6'5"	190	G	Sr.	Columbia, MO, U.S.	Hickman HS
5	Clent Stewart	6'4"	205	G	Jr.	Tulsa, OK, U.S.	Union HS
12	Bill Walker^{2}	6'6"	220	F	Fr.	Huntington, WV, U.S.	North College Hill HS (North College Hill, OH)
14	Serge Afeli	6'9"	235	F	Sr.	Orlando, FL, U.S.	Oak Ridge HS; Daytona Beach CC
15	David Hoskins^{3}	6'5"	230	G	Jr.	Abidjan, Ivory Coast	
15	Luis Colon	6'10"	265	F	Fr.	Bayamón, Puerto Rico	Krop HS (Miami, FL)
20	Cartier Martin	6'7"	220	F	Sr.	Houston, TX, U.S.	Nimitz HS
23	Jermaine Maybank	6'5"	180	F	Fr.	Bronx, NY, U.S.	Bronx Regional High School
31	Chris Merriewether	6'4"	219	G	Fr.	Jacksonville, FL, U.S.	Arlington Country Day HS
31	Deilvez Yearby	6'6"	212	F	So.	Detroit, MI, U.S.	Central HS
34	Akeem Wright	6'6"	190	G	Sr.	Philadelphia, PA, U.S.	M.L. King HS
42	Darren Kent	6'11"	230	F	So.	Apple Valley, MN, U.S.	Eastview HS
44	Brady Johnson	6'7"	220	F	FR.	Salina, KS, U.S.	Ell-Saline HS
51	James Franklin	6'	190	G	Jr.	Kansas City, KS, U.S.	Blue Valley West HS; Cowley County CC
55	Jason Bennett	7'3"	265	C	Fr.	Jacksonville, FL, U.S.	Arlington County

== Schedule ==
Date time, TV	Rank^{#}	Opponent^{#}	Result	Record	Site (attendance) city, state
Regular season
November 11*		William & Mary	W 70-60	1–0 (0-0)	Bramlage Coliseum (13,340); Manhattan, KS
November 15*		at Rutgers	W 55-41	2–0 (0-0)	Louis Brown Athletic Center (4,519); Piscataway, NJ
November 18*		Tennessee Tech	W 101-69	3–0 (0-0)	Bramlage Coliseum (12,806); Manhattan, KS
November 21*		at New Mexico	L 54-78	3–1 (0-0)	The Pit (14,320); Albuquerque, NM
November 25*		Coppin State	W 68-57	4–1 (0-0)	Bramlage Coliseum (13,034); Manhattan, KS
November 29*		at California	L 48-78	4-2 (0-0)	Haas Pavilion (9,026); Berkeley, CA
December 2*		at Colorado State	L 83-84	4–3 (0-0)	Moby Arena (3,894); Fort Collins, CO
December 5*		Cleveland State	W 93-60	5–3 (0-0)	Bramlage Coliseum (12,591); Manhattan, KS
December 9*		at North Dakota State	W 83-81	6–3 (0-0)	Bison Sports Arena (6,110); Fargo, ND
December 17*		Kennesaw State	W 82-54	7–3 (0-0)	Bramlage Coliseum (8,764); Manhattan, KS
December 19*		Maryland Eastern Shore	W 79-58	8–3 (0-0)	Bramlage Coliseum (8,534); Manhattan, KS
December 22*		vs. USC; Findley Toyota Las Vegas Holiday Classic	W 68-55	9–3 (0-0)	Orleans Arena (1,000); Las Vegas, NV
December 23*		vs. New Mexico; Findley Toyota Las Vegas Holiday Classic	W 72-56	10-3 (0-0)	Orleans Arena (3,576); Las Vegas, NV
January 3*		at Xavier	L 66-76	10–4 (0-0)	U.S. Bank Arena (12,298); Cincinnati, OH
Big 12 Regular Season
January 6		at No. 11 Texas A&M	L 65-69	10–5 (0-1)	Reed Arena (11,358); College Station, TX
January 8		Texas Tech	L 52-62	10-6 (0–2)	Bramlage Coliseum (12,913); Manhattan, KS
January 13		at Missouri	W 85-81	11-6 (1-2)	Mizzou Arena (7,340); Columbia, MO
January 17		Baylor	W 69-60	12-6 (2-2)	Bramlage Coliseum (12,637); Manhattan, KS
January 20		at Iowa State	W 69-60	13-6 (3-2)	Hilton Coliseum (14,356); Ames, IA
January 20*		Chicago State	W 73-36	14-6 (3-2)	Bramlage Coliseum (12,628); Manhattan, KS
January 27		Nebraska	W 61-45	15-6 (4-2)	Bramlage Coliseum (13,340); Manhattan, KS
January 31		Missouri	W 80-73	16-6 (5-2)	Bramlage Coliseum (13,266); Manhattan, KS
February 3		at No. 22 Texas	W 73-72	17-6 (6-2)	Frank Erwin Center (15,709); Austin, TX
February 7 Big 12 Network		at No. 9 Kansas; Sunflower Showdown	L 70-97	17–7 (6-3)	Allen Fieldhouse (16,300); Lawrence, KS
February 10		Colorado	W 78-59	18-7 (7-3)	Bramlage Coliseum (13,340); Manhattan, KS
February 13		at Nebraska	L 63-74	18-7 (7-4)	Devaney Sports Center (10,562); Lincoln, NE
February 17		Iowa State	W 65–47	19–7 (8-4)	Bramlage Coliseum (13,314); Manhattan, KS
February 19; ESPN		No. 9 Kansas; Sunflower Showdown	L 62-71	19-8 (8-5)	Bramlage Coliseum (13,340); Manhattan, KS
February 24		at Colorado	W 87-71	20-8 (9-5)	Coors Events Center (4,582); Boulder, CO
February 27		at Oklahoma State	L 70-84	20–9 (9–6)	Gallagher-Iba Arena (13,627); Stillwater, OK
March 3		Oklahoma	W 72–61	21-9 (10-6)	Bramlage Coliseum (13,340); Manhattan, KS
Phillips 66 2007 Big 12 Championship tournament
March 9		vs. Texas Tech	W 66–45	22-10 (10-6)	Ford Center (18,879); Oklahoma City, OK
March 10; ESPN2		vs. No. 2 Kansas	L 61-67	22-11 (10-6)	Ford Center (18,879); Oklahoma City, OK
2007 NIT
March 14*		Vermont; First Round	W 59-57	23-11 (10-6)	Bramlage Coliseum (8,596); Manhattan, KS
March 19*		DePaul; Second Round	L 65-70	23-12 (10-6)	Bramlage Coliseum (13,340); Manhattan, KS
*Non-conference game. ^{#}Rankings from AP Poll. (#) Tournament seedings in parentheses. All times are in Central Time.

== Post-season ==
=== Big 12 tournament ===
The Wildcats went on to a 10–6 record in conference play, earning a number 4 seed in the 2007 Big 12 men's basketball tournament at the Sprint Center in Kansas City, Missouri. The Wildcats faced the #5 seed Texas Tech Red Raiders and won 64-47. They went on to lose in the next round to the #1 seed and eventual champion, Kansas Jayhawks, 67-61.

=== NIT tournament ===
The Wildcats earned a berth in the 2007 National Invitation Tournament as the #2 seed and host team in the West Region. In the first round, Kansas State beat the #7 seed Vermont Catamounts, 59-57. In the second round, the team lost to the #3 seed DePaul Blue Demons, 70-65.
