= 2006–07 Texas A&M Aggies men's basketball team =

American college basketball season

2006–07 Texas A&M Aggies men's basketball

Shelby Metcalf Classic Champion

NCAA Tournament, Sweet Sixteen
- Conference: Big 12 Conference

Ranking
- Coaches: No. 9
- AP: No. 9
- Record: 27–7 (13–3 Big 12)
- Head coach: Billy Gillispie
- Home arena: Reed Arena

2006–07 Big 12 men's basketball standings
	Conf.				Overall
Team	W		L	PCT	W		L	PCT
No. 2 Kansas †	14	–	2	.875	33	–	5	.868
No. 9 Texas A&M	13	–	3	.813	27	–	7	.794
No. 11 Texas	12	–	4	.750	25	–	10	.714
Kansas State	10	–	6	.625	23	–	12	.657
Texas Tech	9	–	7	.563	21	–	13	.618
Missouri	7	–	9	.438	18	–	12	.600
Oklahoma State	6	–	10	.375	22	–	13	.629
Iowa State	6	–	10	.375	15	–	16	.484
Oklahoma	6	–	10	.375	16	–	15	.516
Nebraska	6	–	10	.375	17	–	14	.548
Baylor	4	–	12	.250	15	–	16	.484
Colorado	3	–	13	.188	7	–	20	.259
† 2007 Big 12 Tournament winner Rankings from AP poll

The 2006–07 Texas A&M Aggies men's basketball team represented Texas A&M University in the 2006–07 college basketball season. The team was led by third-year head coach Billy Gillispie, who afterward left the Aggies to coach at the University of Kentucky. The Aggies finished 27–7 (13–3 in the Big 12), achieved the highest national ranking in school history to that point, and advanced to the NCAA Sweet Sixteen. This season was Acie Law IV's senior season, after which he would become the highest draft pick in A&M history at number 11 to the Atlanta Hawks. The Aggies also won the inaugural Shelby Metcalf Classic.

== Recruiting ==
College recruiting information
Name	Hometown	School	Height	Weight	Commit date
Bryan Beasley; PG	Pflugerville, Texas	Pflugerville	5 ft 10 in (1.78 m)	178 lb (81 kg)	Jun 30, 2005
Bryan Beasley; PG	Recruit ratings: Scout: Rivals:				
Bryan Davis; PF	Grand Prairie, Texas	Grand Prairie	6 ft 8 in (2.03 m)	220 lb (100 kg)	Nov 16, 2005
Bryan Davis; PF	Recruit ratings: Scout: Rivals:				
Bryson Graham; SG	San Antonio, Texas	Lon Morris	6 ft 3 in (1.91 m)	190 lb (86 kg)	Mar 30, 2006
Bryson Graham; SG	Recruit ratings: Scout: Rivals:				
Jerrod Johnson; SF	Humble, Texas	Humble	6 ft 6 in (1.98 m)	225 lb (102 kg)	Jun 11, 2004
Jerrod Johnson; SF	Recruit ratings: Scout: Rivals:				
Derrick Roland; SG	Seagoville, Texas	Seagoville	6 ft 4 in (1.93 m)	175 lb (79 kg)	Oct 17, 2005
Derrick Roland; SG	Recruit ratings: Scout: Rivals:				
Donald Sloan; SG	Seagoville, Texas	Seagoville	6 ft 1 in (1.85 m)	180 lb (82 kg)	Oct 17, 2005
Donald Sloan; SG	Recruit ratings: Scout: Rivals:				
Overall recruit ranking: Scout: NR
Note: In many cases, Scout, Rivals, 247Sports, On3, and ESPN may conflict in their listings of height and weight.; In these cases, the average was taken. ESPN grades are on a 100-point scale.; Sources: "Texas A&M 2006 Basketball Commitments". Rivals.; "2006 Texas A&M Commits". Scout.; "Scout.com Team Recruiting Rankings". Scout.; "2006 Team Ranking". Rivals.

== Roster ==
Name	Number	Position	Height	Weight*	Year	Hometown
Law IV, Acie	1	G	6–3	195	Sr.	Dallas, Texas
Bennett, Martellus	2		6–7	250	So.	Houston, Texas
Roland, Derrick	3	G	6–4	185	Fr.	Dallas, Texas
Johnson, Jerrod	4		6–6	220	Fr.	Houston, Texas
Graham, Bryson	5	G	6–3	195	So.	San Antonio, Texas
Blackburn, Brian	12	G	5–10	165	Sr.	La Vernia, Texas
Beasley, Bryan	13		6-0	185	Fr.	Pflugerville, Texas
Johnston, Josh	14		6-2	165	Sr.	Lumberton, Texas
Sloan, Donald	15	G	6–2	210	Fr.	Dallas, Texas
Lee, Logan	20		6–2	185	Sr.	San Antonio, Texas
Kirk, Dominique	22	G	6–3	180	Jr.	Dallas, Texas
Carter, Josh	23	F	6–5	195	So.-2L	Dallas, Texas
Jones, Joseph	30	F	6–9	250	Jr.	Normangee, Texas
Chapman, Chris	31	G	5–11	170	Fr.	Houston, Texas
Muhlbach, Beau	32	G/F	6–4	200	Jr.-2L	Lufkin, Texas
Davis, Bryan	34	F/C	6–9	245	Fr.	Dallas, Texas
Weishuhn, Slade	40		6–9	225	So.	Wall, Texas
Elonu, Chinemelu	41	F/C	6–10	225	Fr.	Houston, Texas
Pompey, Marlon	42		6–8	225	Sr.	Toronto, Canada
Kavaliauskas, Antanas	44	C	6–10	250	Sr.	Vilnius, Lithuania

== Schedule ==
Date time, TV	Rank^{#}	Opponent^{#}	Result	Record	Site (attendance) city, state
Regular season
Nov. 10, 2006	No. 13	Prairie View A&M	W 81–49	1–0	Reed Arena (10,722); College Station, Texas
Nov. 17, 2006	No. 12	Lamar; Shelby Metcalf Classic	W 94–60	2–0	Reed Arena (6,978); College Station, Texas
Nov. 18, 2006	No. 12	Louisiana Tech; Shelby Metcalf Classic	W 75–59	3–0	Reed Arena (6,595); College Station, Texas
Nov. 19, 2006; FSN-SW	No. 12	St. Louis; Shelby Metcalf Classic	W 69–33	4–0	Reed Arena (6,053); College Station, Texas
Nov. 25, 2006	No. 10	Idaho State	W 74–44	5–0	Reed Arena (5,777); College Station, Texas
Nov. 27, 2006	No. 11	Arkansas-Little Rock	W 75–35	6–0	Reed Arena (5,544); College Station, Texas
Dec. 2, 2006	No. 9	Pacific	W 74–62	7–0	Reed Arena (9,977); College Station, Texas
Dec. 5, 2006; FSN-SW	No. 6	at No. 9 LSU	L 52–64	7–1	Pete Maravich Assembly Center (9,274); Baton Rouge, Louisiana
Dec. 9, 2006; CBS	No. 6	vs. No. 1 UCLA; John R. Wooden Classic	L 62–65	7–2	Honda Center (15,811); Anaheim, California
Dec. 12, 2006	No. 13	Fordham	W 84–61	8–2	Reed Arena (7,112); College Station, Texas
Dec. 16, 2006	No. 13	Jacksonville	W 97–58	9–2	Reed Arena (8,908); College Station, Texas
Dec. 22, 2006; CSS	No. 13	at Auburn	W 87–58	10–2	Beard-Eaves-Memorial Coliseum (6,781); Auburn, AL
Dec. 28, 2006	No. 11	Grambling St.	W 101–27	11–2	Reed Arena (7,622); College Station, Texas
Jan. 2, 2007	No. 11	Winthrop	W 71–51	12–2	Reed Arena (10,015); College Station, Texas
Jan. 6, 2007; ESPN+	No. 11	Kansas State	W 69–65	13–2 (1–0)	Reed Arena (11,358); College Station, Texas
Jan. 9, 2007; FSN-SW	No. 8	at Baylor	W 61–51	14–2 (2–0)	Ferrell Center (9,104); Waco, Texas
Jan. 13, 2007; FSN-SW	No. 8	at Colorado	W 87–69	15–2 (3–0)	Coors Events Center (2,953); Boulder, Colorado
Jan. 20, 2007; ESPN+	No. 8	No. 12 Oklahoma State	W 67–49	16–2 (4–0)	Reed Arena (13,187); College Station, Texas
Jan. 24, 2007; TTTV	No. 6	at Texas Tech	L 68–70	16–3 (4–1)	United Spirit Arena (15,011); Lubbock, Texas
Jan. 27, 2007; ESPN	No. 6	Oklahoma	W 70–61	17–3 (5–1)	Reed Arena (13,048); College Station, Texas
Jan. 31, 2007; FSN-SW	No. 10	Iowa State	W 73–49	18–3 (6–1)	Reed Arena (11,148); College Station, Texas
Feb. 3, 2007; ESPN	No. 10	at No. 6 Kansas; ESPN College GameDay	W 69–66	19–3 (7–1)	Allen Fieldhouse (16,300); Lawrence, Kansas
Feb. 5, 2007; ESPN	No. 10	No. 22 Texas	W 100–82	20–3 (8–1)	Reed Arena (13,196); College Station, Texas
Feb. 10, 2007; FSN-SW	No. 6	at Nebraska	W 66–55	21–3 (9–1)	Bob Devaney Sports Center (11,957); Lincoln, Nebraska
Feb. 13, 2007; ESPN2	No. 6	Texas Tech	L 75–77	21–4 (9–2)	Reed Arena (12,926); College Station, Texas
Feb. 17, 2007; ABC	No. 6	at Oklahoma	W 56–49	22–4 (10–2)	Lloyd Noble Center (10,963); Norman, Oklahoma
Feb. 21, 2007; ESPN+	No. 8	at Oklahoma State	W 66–46	23–4 (11–2)	Gallagher-Iba Arena (16,637); Stillwater, Oklahoma
Feb. 24, 2007; ESPN+	No. 8	Baylor	W 97–87	24–4 (12–2)	Reed Arena (13,051); College Station, Texas
Feb. 28, 2007; ESPN2	No. 7	at No. 15 Texas	L 96–98 ^{2OT}	24–5 (12–3)	Frank Erwin Center (16,755); Austin, Texas
Mar. 3, 2007; ESPN+	No. 7	Missouri	W 94–78	25–5 (13–3)	Reed Arena (13,203); College Station, Texas
Postseason
Mar. 8, 2007; ESPN+	No. 7	Oklahoma State; Big 12 Championship Game, First Round	L 56–57	25–6	Ford Center (18,879); Oklahoma City, Oklahoma
Mar. 15, 2007; CBS	No. 9	Penn; First Round	W 68–52	26–6	Rupp Arena (20,816); Lexington, Kentucky
Mar. 17, 2007; CBS	No. 9	No. 16 Louisville; Second Round	W 72–69	27–6	Rupp Arena (20,882); Lexington, Kentucky
Mar. 22, 2007; CBS	No. 9	No. 5 Memphis; Sweet Sixteen	L 64–65	27–7	Alamodome (26,060); San Antonio, Texas
*Non-conference game. ^{#}Rankings from AP Poll. (#) Tournament seedings in parentheses. All times are in Central Time.
