= Caput, Texas =

Ghost town in Texas, US

Caput is a ghost town in Gaines County, Texas, United States.

== History ==
A post office opened in Caput on December 19, 1904. By 1905, the establishment of Seminole caused the town's decline, and its post office was consolidated with Seminole's on January 22, 1906.
