= Marcus Haddock =

American opera singer and voice teacher (born 1957)

- Born: 19 June 1957 (age 69); Fort Worth, Texas
- Other name: Marcus Jerome-Haddock
- Education: Boston University College of Fine Arts (B.M. 1981)
- Occupations: opera singer (tenor); voice teacher
- Years active: 1984–2009 (as opera singer); 2012–present (as voice teacher)

Marcus Haddock (born 19 June 1957) is an American opera singer and voice teacher who in the course of his 25-year stage career sang leading tenor roles throughout the United States and Europe. Born in Fort Worth, Texas and trained at the Boston University College of Fine Arts under Phyllis Curtin, Haddock began his career in the United States after winning the Metropolitan Opera National Council Auditions in 1984. From the late 1980s to the late 1990s he was primarily based in Europe where he sang in all the major opera houses, sometimes performing under the name Marcus Jerome-Haddock. He increasingly sang in American opera houses from 1998 and made his Metropolitan Opera debut in 2003 in the title role of Faust. His early roles were those of the tenore di grazia repertoire, but as his career progressed he also took on heavier lyric and spinto tenor roles such as Rodolfo in La bohème and Don José in Carmen, both of which he has recorded. Haddock retired from the stage in 2009 after suffering two serious strokes, and began a new career as a voice teacher in 2012.

== Life and career ==
Haddock was born in Fort Worth, Texas, the son of Southern Baptist minister. He grew up in West Texas where he attended Seminole High School and played on its football team as well playing trumpet on the school's marching band. After high school, he attended Baylor University as a pre-med student but then transferred to Boston University. There he majored in vocal performance, studying under Phyllis Curtin and graduating with a Bachelor of Music degree in 1981. He entered the Metropolitan Opera National Council Auditions in 1984 winning first place in the New England Region and went on to become one of the 11 National Council winners.

A series of house and orchestra debuts in the United States followed over the next three years, with Haddock's early roles primarily in the tenore di grazia repertoire—Count Almaviva in Il Barbiere di Siviglia, Ramiro in La Cenerentola, Lindoro in L'Italiana in Algeri, and Tonio in La fille du régiment. Haddock made his European debut in 1986 as Ford in Salieri's Falstaff with Opéra National de Bordeaux and returned there the following year as Nemorino in L'elisir d'amore. In 1992 he joined the Opera Bonn ensemble where he made several role debuts including the title roles of The Tales of Hoffmann and Werther, and Roberto in Puccini's Le Villi. He remained based in Europe throughout most of the 1990s, although he returned to the US in 1998 to appear as Ruggero in Washington National Opera's production of La rondine, and increasingly assayed lyric tenor roles, singing as a guest artist at the Vienna Staatsoper, La Scala and the Opéra Bastille in Paris.

From 2000, Haddock continued performing in Europe but increasingly appeared on North American stages as well. He reprised the roles of Ruggero in La rondine and Hoffmann at Los Angeles Opera, appeared as the Duke of Mantua in Rigoletto at Dallas Opera, returned to Washington National Opera as Cavaradossi in Tosca and Pinkerton in Madame Butterfly, and sang Gabriele Adorno in Simon Boccanegra at Santa Fe Opera. His Metropolitan Opera house debut came in 2003 when he sang the title role in Gounod's Faust and appeared there later that season as Alfredo in La traviata. His last performance at the Met was in 2007 as Gabriele Adorno in Simon Boccanegra. In Europe his performances during this time included his house debut at Barcelona's Liceu as Alfredo in La traviata, his role and house debuts as Don José in Carmen at Glyndebourne, and a reprisal of Gabriele Adorno at London's Royal Opera House in 2008.

Haddock retired from the opera stage in 2009. He was preparing to leave for a series of opera engagements in Europe in March of that year when he suffered two massive strokes in 24 hours at his home in Skaneateles, New York where he and wife Kathleen had settled in the late 1990s. The strokes left him partially paralyzed on his left side and also affected his voice. After three years of rehabilitation, surgery, and physiotherapy, he began a new career as a voice teacher. He initially taught in his private studio in Skaneateles and at Hobart and William Smith Colleges. He continues to teach at his private studio and at Colgate University.

== Recordings ==
Haddock's full-length opera recordings include:

- Mercadante: Orazi e Curiazi – Nelly Miricioiu (Camilla), Anthony Michaels-Moore (Orazio), Marcus Haddock (Curiazio), Alastair Miles (Old Orazio); Philharmonia Orchestra and the Mitchell Choir, David Parry (conductor). Released on CD in 1995. Label: Opera Rara.
- Puccini: La Rondine – Ainhoa Arteta (Magda), Marcus Haddock (Ruggero), Inva Mula (Lisette), Richard Troxell (Prunier), William Parcher (Rambaldo); Washington National Opera Orchestra and Chorus, Emmanuel Villaume (conductor). Recorded live at Washington National Opera in 1998, released on DVD in 2009. Label: Decca
- Montemezzi: L'amore dei tre re – Denia Mazzola-Gavazzeni (Fiora), Marcus Haddock (Avito), Stephan Pyatnychko (Manfredo), Kurt Rydl (Arcibaldo); Vienna Symphony, Bregenz Festival Chorus, Vladimir Fedoseyev (conductor). Recorded live at the Bregenz Festival in 1998, released on CD in 1999. Label: Koch Schwann
- Bizet: Carmen – Anne Sofie von Otter (Carmen), Marcus Haddock (Don José), Lisa Milne (Micaëla), Laurent Naouri (Escamillo); London Philharmonic Orchestra, Philippe Jordan (conductor). Recorded live at the Glyndebourne Opera House in 2002, released on DVD in 2003. Label: Opus Arte
- Puccini: La bohème – Norah Amsellem (Mimì), Marcus Haddock (Rodolfo), Georgia Jarman (Musetta), Fabio Capitanucci (Marcello), Christopher Schaldenbrand (Schaunard), Denis Sedov (Colline), Kevin Glavin (Benoit); Atlanta Symphony Orchestra and Chorus, Robert Spano (conductor). Recorded live at Woodruff Arts Center, Atlanta in 2007, released on CD in 2008. Label: Telarc.
