= Seminole Independent School District =

School district in Texas

- 207 SW 6th Street; Seminole, Texas 79360

District information
- Superintendent: Glen Teal
- Schools: 5

Seminole Independent School District is a public school district based in Seminole, Texas, United States.

In 2009, the school district was rated "academically acceptable" by the Texas Education Agency.

== Schools ==
- Seminole High School (grades 9-12)
- Seminole Junior High School (grades 6-8)
- Seminole Elementary School (grades 4-5)
- Seminole Primary School (grades 2-3)
- F.J. Young Elementary School (prekindergarten-grade 1)
