= 2006–07 Nebraska Cornhuskers men's basketball team =

American college basketball season

2006–07 Nebraska Cornhuskers men's basketball

Orange Bowl Basketball Classic Champion
- Conference: Big 12 Conference
- Record: 17-14 (6-10 Big 12)
- Head coach: Doc Sadler
- Home arena: Bob Devaney Sports Center

2006–07 Big 12 men's basketball standings
	Conf.				Overall
Team	W		L	PCT	W		L	PCT
No. 2 Kansas †	14	–	2	.875	33	–	5	.868
No. 9 Texas A&M	13	–	3	.813	27	–	7	.794
No. 11 Texas	12	–	4	.750	25	–	10	.714
Kansas State	10	–	6	.625	23	–	12	.657
Texas Tech	9	–	7	.563	21	–	13	.618
Missouri	7	–	9	.438	18	–	12	.600
Oklahoma State	6	–	10	.375	22	–	13	.629
Iowa State	6	–	10	.375	15	–	16	.484
Oklahoma	6	–	10	.375	16	–	15	.516
Nebraska	6	–	10	.375	17	–	14	.548
Baylor	4	–	12	.250	15	–	16	.484
Colorado	3	–	13	.188	7	–	20	.259
† 2007 Big 12 Tournament winner Rankings from AP poll

The 2006–07 Nebraska Cornhuskers men's basketball team represented the University of Nebraska–Lincoln in the 2006–07 college basketball season. The Cornhuskers were coached by Doc Sadler. The Cornhuskers competed in the Big 12 Conference and played their home games at the Bob Devaney Sports Center.

On December 30, 2006, Nebraska defeated Miami 82–67 in the Orange Bowl Basketball Classic.

They finished with a 17–14 record and their season ended on March 8, 2007, with a 54–39 loss to Oklahoma State in the Big 12 tournament first round.
