= 2007 Big 12 men's basketball tournament =

- Classification: Division I
- Season: 2006–07
- Teams: 12
- Site: Ford Center; Oklahoma City, Oklahoma
- Champions: Kansas (5th title)
- Winning coach: Bill Self (2nd title)
- MVP: Kevin Durant (Texas)
- Attendance: 113,274 (overall); 18,879 (championship)
- Top scorer: Kevin Durant (Texas) (92 points)
- Television: ESPN, ESPN2, ESPN Plus, ESPNU

2006–07 Big 12 men's basketball standings
| | Conf. | | | | Overall |
| Team | W | | L | PCT | W | | L | PCT |
|---|---|---|---|---|---|---|---|---|
| No. 2 Kansas † | 14 | – | 2 | .875 | 33 | – | 5 | .868 |
| No. 9 Texas A&M | 13 | – | 3 | .813 | 27 | – | 7 | .794 |
| No. 11 Texas | 12 | – | 4 | .750 | 25 | – | 10 | .714 |
| Kansas State | 10 | – | 6 | .625 | 23 | – | 12 | .657 |
| Texas Tech | 9 | – | 7 | .563 | 21 | – | 13 | .618 |
| Missouri | 7 | – | 9 | .438 | 18 | – | 12 | .600 |
| Oklahoma State | 6 | – | 10 | .375 | 22 | – | 13 | .629 |
| Iowa State | 6 | – | 10 | .375 | 15 | – | 16 | .484 |
| Oklahoma | 6 | – | 10 | .375 | 16 | – | 15 | .516 |
| Nebraska | 6 | – | 10 | .375 | 17 | – | 14 | .548 |
| Baylor | 4 | – | 12 | .250 | 15 | – | 16 | .484 |
| Colorado | 3 | – | 13 | .188 | 7 | – | 20 | .259 |
† 2007 Big 12 Tournament winner Rankings from AP poll

The 2007 Phillips 66 Big 12 Men's Basketball Championship was the 2007 edition of the Big 12 Conference's championship tournament held at the Ford Center in Oklahoma City from March 8 until March 11, 2007. The tournament ended in an 88–84 overtime victory by the #1 seed Kansas Jayhawks over the #3 seed Texas Longhorns, and was the first Big 12 tournament ever to end in an overtime game.

== Regular season/Tournament seeding ==
In the first preseason poll, Kansas was picked first and received 11 first-place votes. Texas A&M was picked second and received one first-place vote. The rest of the voting was as follows: Oklahoma State was picked third, Texas fourth, Kansas State fifth, Texas Tech sixth, Baylor seventh, Missouri eighth, Oklahoma ninth, Iowa State tenth, Nebraska eleventh, and Colorado twelfth. As preseason polls predicted, Kansas did win the regular-season title, clinching it outright with a 90–86 win over Texas on March 3. Thus, the seedings for the tournament were earned as follows, with tiebreaker procedures followed in breaking a four-way tie for seventh place between Oklahoma State, Iowa State, Oklahoma, and Nebraska (see Tie-Breaking Procedures for more information on seeding in the tournament).

Standings
| | | CONF | | TOT | | Post-Tournament Play | |
| Seed | School | W | L | W | L | NCAA/NIT | Eliminated |
| 1 | Kansas†* | 14 | 2 | 27 | 4 | NCAA | Elite Eight |
| 2 | Texas A&M | 13 | 3 | 25 | 5 | NCAA | Sweet Sixteen |
| 3 | Texas | 12 | 4 | 22 | 8 | NCAA | Second Round |
| 4 | Kansas State | 10 | 6 | 21 | 10 | NIT | Second Round |
| 5 | Texas Tech | 9 | 7 | 21 | 11 | NCAA | First Round |
| 6 | Missouri | 7 | 9 | 18 | 11 | | |
| 7 | Oklahoma State | 6 | 10 | 20 | 11 | NIT | First Round |
| 8 | Iowa State | 6 | 10 | 15 | 16 | | |
| 9 | Oklahoma | 6 | 10 | 16 | 14 | | |
| 10 | Nebraska | 6 | 10 | 17 | 13 | | |
| 11 | Baylor | 4 | 12 | 14 | 15 | | |
| 12 | Colorado | 3 | 13 | 7 | 19 | | |

† – Denotes Tournament Champion. * – Denotes Regular Season Champion

== Schedule ==
| Session | Game | Time | Matchup | Television | Attendance |
First Round – Thursday, March 8
| 1 | 1 | 11:30 am | #9 Oklahoma 68 vs #8 Iowa State 63 | ESPNU | 18,879 |
| 1 | 2 | 2:00 pm | #5 Texas Tech 81 vs #12 Colorado 71 | ESPNU | 18,879 |
| 2 | 3 | 6:00 pm | #7 Oklahoma State 54 vs #10 Nebraska 39 | ESPN Plus | 18,879 |
| 2 | 5 | 8:30 pm | #11 Baylor 97 vs #6 Mizzou 83 | ESPNU | 18,879 |
Quarterfinals – Friday, March 9
| 3 | 5 | 11:30 am | #1 Kansas 64 vs #9 Oklahoma 47 | ESPNU | 18,879 |
| 3 | 6 | 2:00 pm | #4 Kansas State 66 vs #5 Texas Tech 45 | ESPNU | 18,879 |
| 4 | 7 | 6:00 pm | #7 Oklahoma State 57 vs #2 Texas A&M 56 | ESPN Plus | 18,879 |
| 4 | 8 | 8:20 pm | #3 Texas 74 vs #11 Baylor, 69 | ESPN Plus | 18,879 |
Semifinals – Saturday, March 10
| 5 | 9 | 1:00 pm | #1 Kansas 67 vs #4 Kansas State 61 | ESPN2 | 18,879 |
| 5 | 10 | 3:20 pm | #3 Texas 69 vs #7 Oklahoma State 64 | ESPN2 | 18,879 |
Final – Sunday, March 11
| 6 | 11 | 2:00 pm | #1 Kansas 88 vs #3 Texas 84 ^{OT} | ESPN | 18,879 |
Game times in CT. #-Rankings denote tournament seed

== Tournament ==
=== Bracket ===
First Round (March 8)
8 | Iowa State | 63
9 | Oklahoma | 68
5 | Texas Tech | 81
12 | Colorado | 71
7 | Oklahoma State | 54
10 | Nebraska | 39
6 | Missouri | 83
11 | Baylor | 97

Quarterfinals (March 9)
1 | #2 Kansas | 64
9 | Oklahoma | 47
4 | Kansas State | 66
5 | Texas Tech | 45
2 | #7 Texas A&M | 56
7 | Oklahoma State | 57
3 | #15 Texas | 74
11 | Baylor | 69

Semifinals (March 10)
1 | #2 Kansas | 67
4 | Kansas State | 61
7 | Oklahoma State | 64
3 | #15 Texas | 69

Championship (March 11)
1 | #2 Kansas (OT) | 88
3 | #15 Texas | 84

=== Championship game ===
Big 12 Championship
| Teams | 1st Half | 2nd Half | OT | Final |
| Kansas | 34 | 45 | 9 | 88 |
| Texas | 39 | 40 | 5 | 84 |

In a flip-flopping game, Texas charged out of the box to gain an early lead of 32–10. Kansas, however, went on a 24–7 run to cut the Texas lead to 39–34 at the half. The lead then switched to Kansas early in the second half, but a rally by Texas pulled them ahead 73–71 in the final minutes. However, one missed free throw by Texas' Craig Winder allowed a Kansas three-pointer by Mario Chalmers to tie the game with 15 seconds left. In overtime, Kansas was up five with 15.3 seconds left, but a Texas three-pointer by A. J. Abrams cut the lead to two. It took two free throws by Kansas' Darnell Jackson with just over five seconds left to seal the win, 88–84. Durant actually had a chance to score for the win in the second half, but missed the jump shot. He, however, led the game with 37 points. Kansas' Sherron Collins followed with 20. The game is the biggest comeback in Kansas basketball history, eclipsing a 19-point comeback over UCLA in December 1995.

=== Tournament summary ===
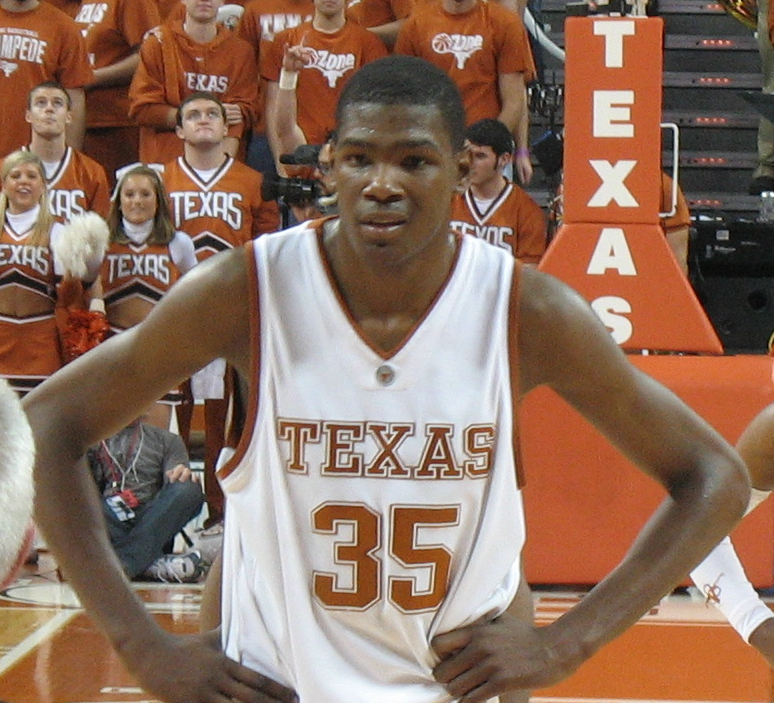
Tournament MVP Kevin Durant.

This was the first Big 12 Basketball Tournament to end with an overtime game. With the win, Kansas moved to 5–1 in the championship game, while Texas fell to 0–4. The 22-point comeback by the Jayhawks in the championship was the biggest in the tournament's history. The second-biggest occurred in the same tournament, when Texas came back from 18 down to defeat the Baylor Bears. This tournament was home to the lowest score in tournament history (39 by Nebraska against Oklahoma State), as well as the highest combined score (180 points in the Missouri-Baylor first-round game).

The Tournament MVP was Kevin Durant, a freshman from the University of Texas, who was a member of the 2007 Big 12 All-Tournament Team with Brandon Rush (Kansas), A. J. Abrams (Texas), Curtis Jerrells (Baylor), and Julian Wright (Kansas). Durant also scored 92 points to surpass the previous Big 12 tournament record of 79 set by Marcus Fizer in 2000.

This edition of the tournament was the first to be played in Oklahoma City; previous tournaments had been played in Kansas City, Missouri or Dallas, Texas. The tournament final was televised by ESPN with play-by-play and commentary by Ron Franklin, Fran Fraschilla, and Holly Rowe.

== All-Tournament Team ==
Most Outstanding Player – Kevin Durant, Texas

| Player | Team | Position | Class |
|---|---|---|---|
| Kevin Durant | Texas | Fr. | F/G |
| Curtis Jerrells | Baylor | So. | G |
| Brandon Rush | Kansas | So. | G |
| Julian Wright | Kansas | So. | F |
| A.J. Abrams | Texas | So. | G |

== See also ==
- 2007 Big 12 Conference women's basketball tournament
- 2007 NCAA Division I men's basketball tournament
- 2006–07 NCAA Division I men's basketball rankings
