= 2006–07 Missouri Tigers men's basketball team =

American college basketball season

2006–07 Missouri Tigers men's basketball
- Conference: Big 12
- North
- Record: 18–12 (7–9 Big 12)
- Head coach: Mike Anderson
- Assistant coaches: Melvin Watkins; Matt Zimmerman; T.J. Cleveland
- Home arena: Mizzou Arena

2006–07 Big 12 men's basketball standings
	Conf.				Overall
Team	W		L	PCT	W		L	PCT
No. 2 Kansas †	14	–	2	.875	33	–	5	.868
No. 9 Texas A&M	13	–	3	.813	27	–	7	.794
No. 11 Texas	12	–	4	.750	25	–	10	.714
Kansas State	10	–	6	.625	23	–	12	.657
Texas Tech	9	–	7	.563	21	–	13	.618
Missouri	7	–	9	.438	18	–	12	.600
Oklahoma State	6	–	10	.375	22	–	13	.629
Iowa State	6	–	10	.375	15	–	16	.484
Oklahoma	6	–	10	.375	16	–	15	.516
Nebraska	6	–	10	.375	17	–	14	.548
Baylor	4	–	12	.250	15	–	16	.484
Colorado	3	–	13	.188	7	–	20	.259
† 2007 Big 12 Tournament winner Rankings from AP poll

The 2006–07 Missouri Tigers men's basketball team represented the University of Missouri in the 2006–07 NCAA Division I men's basketball season. The season marked the first year of Mike Anderson's tenure.

== Pre-season ==
Missouri returned just two starters from the 2005-06 team, which finished 11th in the Big 12 and 12–16 overall. Guard Jimmy McKinney and center Kevin Young graduated, and leading scorer Thomas Gardner left school for the professional ranks. The coaching turmoil involving Quin Snyder had defined the previous season; the Tigers controversially fired the head coach in February in the middle of a losing streak. Athletic director Mike Alden chose Mike Anderson from the University of Alabama at Birmingham (UAB), hiring him on March 26, 2006.

Anderson promised to bring "The Fastest Forty Minutes of Basketball" to Columbia, a style of play modeled after Nolan Richardson's "40 Minutes of Hell." However, Anderson's moniker did not become popular until a few seasons had passed.

Anderson inherited seven players from Snyder's tenure. Junior Marshall Brown appeared to be a rising star after averaging almost double figures in scoring as a sophomore. Point guard Jason Horton, center Kalen Grimes and swingman Glen Dandridge—all of whom arrived in Columbia as a highly touted group of recruits—rounded out the junior class. Sophomore Leo Lyons returned as well, along with sophomore Matt Lawrence, who played sparingly as a freshman. The only senior on the squad was Marcus Watkins, son of assistant coach Melvin Watkins.

Anderson's first recruiting class featured three junior college players in point guard Stefhon Hannah, forward Vaidatos Volkus and forward Darryl Butterfield. Hannah figured to star for Missouri right away; Anderson had plucked him away from Kansas State and Bob Huggins, who also heavily recruited him. Volkus was signed by Snyder's staff and retained by Anderson, and Butterfield was an obscure recruit from Mineral Area College. Anderson also brought in two freshmen: Keon Lawrence and J.T. Tiller. Lawrence was also a Snyder signee but stayed on because the school kept Watkins on staff. Tiller had committed to Anderson at UAB and followed him to MU.

With the program in turmoil and the loss of so many productive players from the previous team, the media picked Missouri to finish eighth in the Big 12.

== Non-Conference ==
Missouri did not have much difficulty in Mike Anderson's first three games as head coach, defeating North Carolina A&T, Army and Stetson to capture the John Thompson Foundation Classic title. The Tigers, who did not play a road game until December, began 9–0, facing mostly inferior opponents. However, MU did actually defeat two eventual NCAA tournament squads during this stretch. On November 19, the Tigers overcome a modest five-point deficit in the second half to defeat Davidson, a team that wound up with a 13-seed in March. Freshman Stephen Curry, a future First-Team All-American and NBA Draft pick in 2009, played for the Wildcats and scored 16 points. A few weeks later on November 30, Missouri routed the University of Arkansas 86–64 in a nationally televised game. The Razorbacks—the program that employed Anderson for 17 seasons as an assistant and later hired him as head coach in 2011—turned the ball over 24 times, giving Anderson's frenetic style of play a signature win for the first time in Columbia. Due to one of the more significant snowfalls in mid-Missouri history, only 5,428 fans attended the game. The athletic department allowed the fans to fill the lower bowl, though, to compensate for a storm that forced MU to cancel classes the next day.

Missouri's undefeated start ended when it played its first true road game in West Lafayette, Indiana. A Carl Landry-led Purdue team broke away in the second half to win 79–62. Less than two weeks later, Missouri dropped its second game of the season, a 73–70 loss to rival Illinois in the Braggin' Rights series. The loss marked the seventh straight loss in the series for the Tigers. In a back-and-forth game, Illinois held on for the victory after junior guard Stefhon Hannah fumbled the ball on the final possession and failed to get off a potential game-tying three-pointer.

The Tigers won their final two games of non-conference play, which included an 83–75 home win over Mississippi State. Ben Hansbrough, who later transferred to Notre Dame and earned Big East Player of the Year honors in 2011, scored eight points in that game for the Bulldogs.

== Conference play ==
The momentum of MU's surprising 11–2 start faded immediately, as the Tigers began Big 12 play with four straight losses. In Anderson's Big 12 debut, Iowa State overcame a 16-point second-half deficit to win on a last-second tip-in by Wesley Johnson. Keeping with the trend of undiscovered stars, Johnson is yet another Missouri opponent during the 2006–07 season that eventually reached stardom—Johnson transferred to Syracuse and won Big East Player of the Year honors in 2010 and was drafted fourth in the 2010 NBA draft. Four days later, a heavily favored Texas Longhorns team dominated Missouri in Austin, thanks to 34 points from Kevin Durant. Then, in the midst of another ice storm, Missouri dropped a home game to Kansas State. The Tigers nearly recovered from a 16-point hole in the second half, and trailed by just five points with less than a minute to play. However, with a chance to throw down a monstrous dunk in the open court, junior forward Marshall Brown missed the jam and killed any hope of a comeback. Two days after that loss, Missouri faced the rival Kansas Jayhawks in Lawrence in an ESPN "Big Monday" game on Martin Luther King Day. The underdog Tigers battled the 6th-ranked Jayhawks wire-to-wire, but sophomore Matt Lawrence's tying three-point attempt as time expired did not even catch the rim.

Anderson won his first Big 12 game in Boulder, Colo., as the Tigers dominated the Buffaloes in a 14-point victory. MU returned home to defeat Bob Knight's Texas Tech team to draw to 2–4 in conference play, but it lost three of its next four games to fall to 3–7.

The Tigers worked their way back into post-season contention, though, with a three-game winning streak. First, Missouri edged Baylor by seven points on Valentine's Day. Three days later, Anderson won his first game against a ranked opponent by beating 18th-ranked Oklahoma State 75–64 at Gallagher-Iba Arena, a traditionally difficult Big 12 venue. Freshman guard Keon Lawrence led the team with 18 points, and even little-used reserve Glen Dandridge made a three-pointer and scored five points in four minutes of action. The next week, Lawrence—no relation to Matt Lawrence—continued his strong play and came up with one of the season's most exciting plays in a win over the Oklahoma Sooners. Lawrence made the game-winning basket with a turnaround jumper with less than a minute to play, despite not making a field goal in the first half.

At 6–7, the Tigers had finally worked their way into the NCAA tournament at-large conversation. Although experts said it was a pipe dream, Missouri appeared to have a very slim chance if it could win the remainder of its games and finish above .500 in the Big 12. Any talk of the NCAA Tournament ended after MU dropped an overtime game to the Nebraska Cornhuskers in Lincoln, though, a game dominated by Australian center Aleks Maric, who scored 31 points. Maric, who proved to be an extremely difficult match-up for the smaller Tigers during his career, made five free throws to seal the game in the final minute of overtime. Freshman J.T. Tiller missed a game-winning attempt at the end of regulation in that game, and the Tigers missed three shots from behind the arc with a chance to tie the game in OT.

Missouri finished the conference season with a home win over Colorado on senior night, which honored lone senior Marcus Watkins, the son of assistant coach Melvin Watkins. The Tigers battled Texas A&M to a tie at half-time in the Big 12 finale, but the Sweet 16-bound Aggies blew the game open in the second half for a comfortable win. That left MU with a 7–9 record and a sixth-place finish in the Big 12.

== Big 12 Tournament ==
Missouri drew 11th-seeded Baylor in the first round of the 2007 Big 12 Tournament, a game televised by ESPN2. The Bears entered the game with a 14–15 record but featured a young, talented backcourt—the same players who took the program to a surprising NCAA Tournament appearance just one year later. Baylor's talent was obvious on the court that night, and Scott Drew's team shocked Missouri with a 14-point win. The loss was considered embarrassing at the time for Anderson's program, which appeared to take a step back after a promising regular season. Anderson's vaunted pressing style did not fare well against Baylor, as it shot 63 percent from the field and burned Missouri's full-court pressure for 40 minutes.

Upon elimination from the Big 12 Tournament, the Tigers clearly did not have the credentials for an NCAA Tournament at-large bid. However, with a 6th-place finish in a power conference and an 18–12 overall record, the Tigers appeared headed to at least the NIT. On March 12, 2007, though, the NIT did not select Missouri to participate, ending Anderson's first season as head coach.

== Schedule ==
Date time, TV	Rank^{#}	Opponent^{#}	Result	Record	Site (attendance) city, state
Preseason
2006/11/3; 7:00 p.m., MSN		University of Missouri-Rolla	W 105–67		Mizzou Arena (5,626); Columbia, MO
2007/11/6; 7:00 p.m., MSN		Lithuania Academy	W 94–40		Mizzou Arena (4,212); Columbia, MO
Non-Conference Regular Season
2006/11/10*; 7:00 p.m.		North Carolina A&T; John Thompson Foundation Classic	W 101–80	1–0	Mizzou Arena (6,230); Columbia, MO
2006/11/11*; 3:00 p.m., MSN		Army; John Thompson Foundation Classic	W 67–58	2–0	Mizzou Arena (7,386); Columbia, MO
2006/11/12*; 4:00 p.m., MSN		Stetson; John Thompson Foundation Classic	W 66–45	3–0	Mizzou Arena (4,634); Columbia, MO
2006/11/16*; 7:00 p.m.		Lipscomb	W 89–69	4–0	Mizzou Arena (5,413); Columbia, MO
2006/11/19*; 1:00 p.m., MSN		Davidson	W 81–75	5–0	Mizzou Arena (5,319); Columbia, MO
2006/11/25*; 6:00 p.m.		Stephen F. Austin	W 85–56	6–0	Mizzou Arena (7,470); Columbia, MO
2006/11/27*; 7:00 p.m.		Coppin State	W 98–77	7–0	Mizzou Arena (5,737); Columbia, MO
2006/11/30*; 8:00 p.m., ESPN2		Arkansas	W 86–64	8–0	Mizzou Arena (5,428); Columbia, MO
2006/12/3*; 12:00 p.m., MSN		Evansville	W 73–54	9–0	Mizzou Arena (4,857); Columbia, MO
2006/12/9*; 2:00 p.m., ESPN360		at Purdue	L 62–79	9–1	Mackey Arena (13,505); West Lafayette, IN
2006/12/19*; 8:00 p.m., ESPN		vs. Illinois; Busch Braggin’ Rights Game	L 70–73	9–2	Scottrade Center (22,153); St. Louis, MO
2006/12/30*; 5:30 p.m., MSN		Southern	W 87–58	10–2	Mizzou Arena (9,091); Columbia, MO
2007/1/2*; 7:00 p.m., MSN		Mississippi State	W 83–75	11–2	Mizzou Arena (7,527); Columbia, MO
Big 12 Regular Season
2007/1/6; 5:00 p.m., MSN		Iowa State	L 65–66	11–3 (0–1)	Mizzou Arena (10,142); Columbia, MO
2007/1/10; 7:00 p.m., MSN		at No. 25 Texas	L 68–88	11–4 (0–2)	Frank Erwin Center (11,983); Austin, TX
2007/1/13; 3:00 p.m., ESPN+		Kansas State	L 81–85	11–5 (0–3)	Mizzou Arena (7,340); Columbia, MO
2007/1/15; 8:00 p.m., ESPN		at No. 5 Kansas	L 77–80	11–6 (0–4)	Allen Fieldhouse (16,300); Lawrence, KS
2007/1/24; 8:00 p.m., MSN		at Colorado	W 79–65	12–6 (1–4)	Coors Events Center (3,186); Boulder, CO
2007/1/27; 3:00 p.m., ESPN+		Texas Tech	W 71–58	13–6 (2–4)	Mizzou Arena (15,061); Columbia, MO
2007/1/31; 8:00 p.m., ESPNU		at Kansas State	L 73–80	13–7 (2–5)	Bramlage Coliseum (13,266); Manhattan, KS
2007/2/3; 12:47 p.m., ESPN+		Nebraska	L 61–66	13–8 (2–6)	Mizzou Arena (15,061); Columbia, MO
2007/2/6; 7:00 p.m., MSN		at Iowa State	W 77–55	14–8 (3–6)	Hilton Coliseum (11,933); Ames, IA
2007/2/10; 2:30 p.m., ABC		No. 8 Kansas	L 74–92	14–9 (3–7)	Mizzou Arena (15,061); Columbia, MO
2007/2/14; 6:00 p.m., MSN		Baylor	W 78–71	15–9 (4–7)	Mizzou Arena (6,549); Columbia, MO
2007/2/17; 12:47 p.m., ESPN+		at No. 18 Oklahoma State	W 75–64	16–9 (5–7)	Gallagher-Iba Arena (14,044); Stillwater, OK
2007/2/20; 6:00 p.m., MSN		Oklahoma	W 72–68	17–9 (6–7)	Mizzou Arena (9,165); Columbia, MO
2007/2/24; 12:47 p.m., ESPN+		at Nebraska	L 77–82 ^{OT}	17–10 (6–8)	Bob Devaney Sports Center (11,154); Lincoln, NE
2007/2/28; 6:00 p.m., MSN		Colorado	W 91–82	18–10 (7–8)	Mizzou Arena (9,141); Columbia, MO
2007/3/3; 3:00 p.m., ESPN+		at No. 7 Texas A&M	L 78–94	18–11 (7–9)	Reed Arena (13,203); College Station, TX
Big 12 Tournament
2007/3/8; 8:20 p.m., ESPN2		vs. Baylor; First Round	L 83–97	18–12 (7–9)	Ford Center (18,879); Oklahoma City, OK
*Non-conference game. ^{#}Rankings from AP Poll. (#) Tournament seedings in parentheses. All times are in Central Standard Time.

== Roster ==
Name	#	Position	Height	Weight	Year	Home Town
Keon Lawrence	2	Guard	6–2	180	FR	Newark, New Jersey
Stefhon Hannah	3	Guard	6–1	175	JR	Chicago, Illinois
J. T. Tiller	4	Guard	6–3	190	FR	Marietta, Georgia
Leo Lyons	5	Forward	6–9	225	SO	Kansas City, Kansas
Nick Berardini	10	Guard	6–1	180	JR	Lake Forest, Illinois
Jason Horton	12	Guard	6–2	190	JR	Dallas, Texas
Michael Anderson Jr.	13	Guard	5–11	170	JR	Birmingham, Alabama
Marshall Brown	15	Forward	6–6	220	JR	Austin, Texas
Marcus Watkins	23	Forward	6–4	200	SR	Charlotte, North Carolina
Glen Dandridge	25	Forward	6–6	220	JR	Goochland, Virginia
Vaidotas Volkus	32	Forward	6–8	220	JR	Panevėžys, Lithuania
Matt Lawrence	33	Guard	6–7	210	SO	Wildwood, Missouri
Darryl Butterfield	35	Forward	6–7	225	JR	Miami, Florida
Kalen Grimes	44	Center	6–9	250	JR	Hazelwood, Missouri

== Rankings ==
Poll	Pre	Wk 1	Wk 2	Wk 3	Wk 4	Wk 5	Wk 6	Wk 7	Wk 8	Wk 9	Wk 10	Wk 11	Wk 12	Wk 13	Wk 14	Wk 15	Wk 16	Wk 17	Final
AP																			
Coaches																			

== Final season statistics ==
Player	GP-GS	Min/G	FG%	3PT%	FT%	R/G	A/G	STL	BLK	PTS/G
**Stefhon Hannah**	30–29	30.4	.452	.391	.788	3.5	4.6	72	0	15.4
**Matt Lawrence**	30–30	27.3	.485	.443	.722	3.1	0.8	28	1	11.2
**Marshall Brown**	30–29	21.8	.450	.294	.705	4.2	1.5	23	11	10.1
Keon Lawrence	30–8	23.5	.433	.388	.788	2.9	1.9	35	11	9.7
Leo Lyons	30–6	17.9	.550	.190	.646	4.3	1.1	33	22	7.4
**Kalen Grimes**	30–24	16.7	.497	.000	.596	5.6	0.4	8	35	7.0
Darryl Butterfield	29–1	14.0	.491	.263	.600	2.8	0.8	21	3	4.6
J.T. Tiller	30–0	13.6	.427	.324	.703	1.3	1.1	22	1	4.2
**Jason Horton**	30–22	21.7	.351	.345	.568	1.9	3.2	38	22	3.6
Marcus Watkins	24–1	6.7	.488	.400	.647	1.0	0.2	9	0	2.3
Vaidotas Volkus	23–0	6.9	.500	.000	.625	1.8	0.0	6	4	2.2
Glen Dandridge	18–0	4.8	.276	.211	.833	0.7	0.1	7	1	1.4
Nick Berardini	8–0	1.1	.333	.333	.333	0.1	0.0	0	0	0.5
Michael Anderson Jr.	10–0	1.9	.333	1.000	.000	0.3	0.1	0	0	0.3

- starters in bold (Determined as five players with most starts)

== See also ==
- 2007 NCAA Men's Division I Basketball Tournament
- 2006-07 NCAA Division I men's basketball season
- 2006-07 NCAA Division I men's basketball rankings
- List of NCAA Division I institutions
