= 2006–07 Kansas Jayhawks men's basketball team =

American college basketball season

2006–07 Kansas Jayhawks men's basketball

Big 12 tournament champions Big 12 regular season champions

NCAA Tournament, Elite Eight
- Conference: Big 12 Conference

Ranking
- Coaches: No. 5
- AP: No. 2
- Record: 33–5 (14–2 Big 12)
- Head coach: Bill Self (4th Season)
- Assistant coaches: Joe Dooley (4th season); Tim Jankovich (4th season); Kurtis Townsend (3rd season)
- Captain: Russell Robinson
- Home arena: Allen Fieldhouse

2006–07 Big 12 men's basketball standings
	Conf.				Overall
Team	W		L	PCT	W		L	PCT
No. 2 Kansas †	14	–	2	.875	33	–	5	.868
No. 9 Texas A&M	13	–	3	.813	27	–	7	.794
No. 11 Texas	12	–	4	.750	25	–	10	.714
Kansas State	10	–	6	.625	23	–	12	.657
Texas Tech	9	–	7	.563	21	–	13	.618
Missouri	7	–	9	.438	18	–	12	.600
Oklahoma State	6	–	10	.375	22	–	13	.629
Iowa State	6	–	10	.375	15	–	16	.484
Oklahoma	6	–	10	.375	16	–	15	.516
Nebraska	6	–	10	.375	17	–	14	.548
Baylor	4	–	12	.250	15	–	16	.484
Colorado	3	–	13	.188	7	–	20	.259
† 2007 Big 12 Tournament winner Rankings from AP poll

The 2006–07 Kansas Jayhawks men's basketball team represented the University of Kansas Jayhawks for the NCAA Division I men's intercollegiate basketball season of 2006–07. The team was led by Bill Self in his fourth season as head coach. The team played its home games in Allen Fieldhouse in Lawrence, Kansas.

The Jayhawks' won the regular season championship with fourteen conference wins—the third straight season in which the team has claimed a share of the championship. In postseason play the team defeated its conference opponents to claim its second straight title. In the NCAA Division I tournament, the Jayhawks were defeated in the Elite Eight.

== Recruiting ==
College recruiting information
Name	Hometown	School	Height	Weight	Commit date
Darrell Arthur; PF	Dallas, Texas	South Oak Cliff HS	6 ft 9 in (2.06 m)	217 lb (98 kg)	May 9, 2005
Darrell Arthur; PF	Recruit ratings: Scout: Rivals: (N/A)				
Sherron Collins; PG	Chicago	Crane Technical Prep Common HS	5 ft 11 in (1.80 m)	180 lb (82 kg)	Oct 16, 2005
Sherron Collins; PG	Recruit ratings: Scout: Rivals: (N/A)				
Brady Morningstar; SG	Lawrence, Kansas	The New Hampton School (New Hampton, New Hampshire)	6 ft 3 in (1.91 m)	165 lb (75 kg)	Oct 4, 2005
Brady Morningstar; SG	Recruit ratings: Scout: Rivals: (N/A)				
Overall recruit ranking: Scout: 8 Rivals: 12 ESPN: N/A
Note: In many cases, Scout, Rivals, 247Sports, On3, and ESPN may conflict in their listings of height and weight.; In these cases, the average was taken. ESPN grades are on a 100-point scale.; Sources: "Kansas 2006 Basketball Commitments". Rivals.; "2006 Kansas Basketball Commits". Scout.; "ESPN". ESPN.; "Scout.com Team Recruiting Rankings". Scout.; "2006 Team Ranking". Rivals.

== Season Synopsis ==
After returning every key player from the 2006 team that shared the Big 12 regular season title with the Texas Longhorns and defeated Texas for the conference tournament title, the Jayhawks expected to repeat as Big 12 champs and contend for the national title in 2006–07. ESPN's Andy Katz had ranked the Jayhawks as the second best team in the nation for the preseason, while Dick Vitale had the Jayhawks ranked third. The starting lineup included Russell Robinson (guard), Mario Chalmers (guard), Brandon Rush (small forward), Julian Wright (power/small forward), and Sasha Kaun (Center). Darrell Arthur and Sherron Collins were the nucleus of Bill Self's recruiting class for the 06–07 season and provided valuable minutes coming off the bench. Some key returnees included Darnell Jackson and Jeremy Case.

One early-season casualty was C.J. Giles. He was suspended in early November for failure to attend practices, for poor showing in the classroom, and because of unpaid child support. He was to have been reinstated for the Winston-Salem State game, but another incident involving charges of assault and battery against his ex-girlfriend left Bill Self with no choice but to dismiss the troubled center from the team. Giles transferred to play for the Oregon State Beavers. His problems, however, persisted to a degree that he was dismissed from OSU in January 2008.

Following the victory over #1 ranked and defending National Champion Florida in Las Vegas, athletic director Lew Perkins announced that he had extended Coach Bill Self's contract through 2011.

Until February 3, no team from the Big 12 South division had ever beaten Kansas in Allen Fieldhouse since the conference's formation in the 1996 offseason. That streak came to an end when Texas A&M came from 11 down to beat KU 69–66; this also marked the first time ever that the Aggies had beaten the Jayhawks. As it turned out, that would be the last time until 2011 that anyone would beat the Jayhawks in Allen Fieldhouse, as KU would go on to post a school and conference record 69-game homecourt winning streak.

There were two streaks that remained intact. Kansas extended its streak of consecutive home wins against Colorado to 24 with a 97–74 victory on January 27, 2007. KU also maintained the 24-game on-the-road win streak against Kansas State in Manhattan with a 71–62 victory in Bramlage Coliseum on February 19, 2007. KU won the final five games with KSU in Ahearn Fieldhouse and the first 19 meetings in Bramlage through 2007.

Kansas won the 2007 regular season Big 12 championship, finishing in first place with a 14–2 record in conference play. In doing so, they clinched their third straight regular season title and their first outright Big 12 title since 2003, having settled for ties with Oklahoma and Texas the previous two seasons. They came from down 16 against Texas to win 90–86, leading by as many as 10 at one point and holding on for the four-point win. The title is the Jayhawks' 50th all-time since joining the Missouri Valley Conference in 1907–08. It is also KU's fifth outright Big 12 championship and seventh overall.

The outright title gave Kansas the top seed for the Big 12 Tournament and a bye for the preliminary rounds of play. In the quarterfinal, KU faced ninth-seed Oklahoma and prevailed 64–47. In the semifinal, KU faced fourth-seed Kansas State and prevailed 67–61. Finally, in the title game, KU defeated Texas 88–84 in overtime to win the Big 12 Tournament. They pulled off an even bigger comeback than in the regular-season meeting, coming from down 22 to win. The 22-point comeback is the biggest in KU history, eclipsing the 19-point comeback in an 85–70 win over UCLA in 1995.

Kansas earned the top seed for the West Region of the 2007 NCAA Division I men's basketball tournament. In subregional action at the United Center in Chicago, KU defeated Niagara 107–67 and Kentucky 88–76.

In the Sweet 16, KU escaped a tough defensive stance from Southern Illinois, winning 61–58 at HP Pavilion in San Jose, California. The victory sent KU to the Elite Eight against the second-seeded UCLA Bruins, but they lost 68–55, their largest margin of defeat all season. KU has never won a game against UCLA in NCAA Tournament play, losing all five meetings. The loss also left Bill Self at 0–4 all-time in Elite Eight games, having lost with Tulsa, Illinois, and Kansas (twice), a problem he eliminated the following season.

Kansas finished the season 33–5, winning the Big 12 regular-season and postseason championships, reaching the Elite Eight, and achieving the seventh 30-win season in school history.

On April 9, 2007, sophomore forward Julian Wright announced that he would forgo his junior and senior seasons, hire an agent (therefore forfeiting his amateur status and college eligibility), and enter his name into the NBA draft. Teammate and fellow sophomore Brandon Rush had originally chosen to follow suit, announcing on April 26, 2007 his plan of entering his name into the NBA draft, but decided to not hire an agent (therefore allowing him to return to KU if he decided to withdraw his name from the draft). However, after tearing his anterior cruciate ligament in a pickup game of basketball, Rush changed his mind and decided to return for his junior season at KU. Rush's surgery was successful; and, as it turned out the following season, the injury was a blessing in disguise for Rush and the Jayhawks.

== Roster ==
Name	#	Position	Height	Weight	Year	Hometown
Darrell Arthur	00	Power forward	6–9	230	Freshman	Dallas, Texas
Brennan Bechard	11	Point guard	6–0	183	Sophomore	Lawrence, Kansas
Jeremy Case	10	Point guard	6–1	182	Junior	McAlester, Oklahoma
Mario Chalmers	15	Point guard	6–1	195	Sophomore	Anchorage, Alaska
Sherron Collins	4	Point guard	5–11	200	Freshman	Chicago, Illinois
Darnell Jackson	32	Power forward	6–8	250	Junior	Oklahoma City, Oklahoma
Sasha Kaun	24	Center	6–11	245	Junior	Tomsk, Russia
Matt Kleinmann	54	Center	6–10	247	Sophomore	Overland Park, Kansas
Brady Morningstar	12	Shooting guard	6–3	185	Freshman	Lawrence, Kansas
Russell Robinson	3	Point guard	6–1	200	Junior	New York City, New York
Brandon Rush	25	Shooting guard	6–6	210	Sophomore	Kansas City, Missouri
Rodrick Stewart	5	Shooting guard	6–4	205	Junior	Seattle, Washington
Brad Witherspoon	40	Point guard	6–1	180	Junior	Humboldt, Kansas
Julian Wright	30	Small forward	6–8	225	Sophomore	Chicago Heights, Illinois

== Schedule ==
Date time, TV	Rank^{#}	Opponent^{#}	Result	Record	Site (attendance) city, state
Exhibition
November 2*; 7:00 p.m., KU-ESPN+	No. 3	Washburn exhibition	W 99–69	1–0	Allen Fieldhouse (16,300); Lawrence, Kansas
November 7*; 7:00 p.m., KU-ESPN+	No. 3	Emporia State exhibition	W 90–55	2–0	Allen Fieldhouse (16,300); Lawrence, Kansas
Regular season
November 11*; 7:00 p.m., KU-ESPN+	No. 3	Northern Arizona	W 91–57	1–0	Allen Fieldhouse (16,300); Lawrence, Kansas
November 15*; 7:00 p.m., KU-ESPN+	No. 3	Oral Roberts	L 71–78	1–1	Allen Fieldhouse (16,300); Lawrence, Kansas
November 19*; 7:00 p.m., KU-ESPN+	No. 3	Towson; Findlay Toyota Las Vegas Invitational	W 87–61	2–1	Allen Fieldhouse (16,300); Lawrence, Kansas
November 21*; 7:00 p.m., KU-ESPN+	No. 10	Tennessee State; Findlay Toyota Las Vegas Invitational	W 89–54	3–1	Allen Fieldhouse (16,300); Lawrence, Kansas
November 24*; 7:00 p.m., KU-ESPN+	No. 10	vs. Ball State; Findlay Toyota Las Vegas Invitational	W 64–46	4–1	Orleans Arena (8,500); Las Vegas
November 25*; 10:00 p.m., ESPN2	No. 10	vs. No. 1 Florida; Findlay Toyota Las Vegas Invitational	W 82–80 ^{OT}	5–1	Orleans Arena (8,500); Las Vegas
November 28*; 7:00 p.m., KU-ESPN+	No. 5	Dartmouth	W 83–32	6–1	Allen Fieldhouse (16,300); Lawrence, Kansas
December 2*; 1:00 p.m., ESPNU	No. 5	at DePaul	L 57–64	6–2	Allstate Arena (16,922); Rosemont, Illinois
December 4*; 8:00 p.m., ESPN2	No. 5	USC	W 72–62	7–2	Allen Fieldhouse (16,300); Lawrence, Kansas
December 9*; 12:00 p.m., ESPN2	No. 12	vs. Toledo; American Century Investments Shootout	W 68–58	8–2	Kemper Arena (16,488); Kansas City, Missouri
December 19*; 7:00 p.m., KU-ESPN+	No. 11	Winston-Salem State	W 94–43	9–2	Allen Fieldhouse (16,300); Lawrence, Kansas
December 23*; 1:00 p.m., CBS	No. 11	Boston College	W 84–66	10–2	Allen Fieldhouse (16,300); Lawrence, Kansas
December 28*; 7:00 p.m., KU-ESPN+	No. 9	Detroit Mercy	W 63–43	11–2	Allen Fieldhouse (16,300); Lawrence, Kansas
December 30*; 7:00 p.m., KU-ESPN+	No. 9	Rhode Island	W 80–69	12–2	Allen Fieldhouse (16,300); Lawrence, Kansas
January 7*; 3:30 p.m., CBS	No. 9	at South Carolina	W 70–54	13–2	Colonial Center (14,713); Columbia, South Carolina
January 10; 8:00 p.m., ESPN2	No. 6	No. 9 Oklahoma State	W 87–57	14–2 (1–0)	Allen Fieldhouse (16,300); Lawrence, Kansas
January 13; 1:00 p.m., ESPN	No. 6	at Iowa State	W 68–64 ^{OT}	15–2 (2–0)	Hilton Coliseum (13,226); Ames, Iowa
January 15; 8:00 p.m., ESPN	No. 6	Missouri	W 80–77	16–2 (3–0)	Allen Fieldhouse (16,300); Lawrence, Kansas
January 20; 3:00 p.m., ESPN	No. 5	at Texas Tech	L 64–69	16–3 (3–1)	United Spirit Arena (11,469); Lubbock, Texas
January 24; 7:00 p.m., KU-ESPN+	No. 8	at Baylor	W 82–56	17–3 (4–1)	Ferrell Center (8,102); Waco, Texas
January 27; 12:30 p.m., BIG 12-ESPN+	No. 8	Colorado	W 97–74	18–3 (5–1)	Allen Fieldhouse (16,300); Lawrence, Kansas
January 29; 8:00 p.m., ESPN	No. 8	at Nebraska	W 76–56	19–3 (6–1)	Bob Devaney Sports Center (12,262); Lincoln, Nebraska
February 3; 8:00 p.m., ESPN	No. 6	No. 10 Texas A&M	L 66–69	19–4 (6–2)	Allen Fieldhouse (16,300); Lawrence, Kansas
February 7; 8:00 p.m., BIG 12-ESPN+	No. 9	Kansas State	W 97–70	20–4 (7–2)	Allen Fieldhouse (16,300); Lawrence, Kansas
February 10; 2:30 p.m., ABC	No. 9	at Missouri	W 92–74	21–4 (8–2)	Mizzou Arena (15,061); Columbia, Missouri
February 14; 8:00 p.m., KU-ESPN+	No. 9	at Colorado	W 75–46	22–4 (9–2)	Coors Events Center (6,608); Boulder, Colorado
February 17; 3:00 p.m., BIG 12-ESPN+	No. 9	Nebraska	W 92–39	23–4 (10–2)	Allen Fieldhouse (16,300); Lawrence, Kansas
February 19; 8:00 p.m., ESPN	No. 9	at Kansas State	W 71–62	24–4 (11–2)	Bramlage Coliseum (13,340); Manhattan, Kansas
February 24; 5:00 p.m., ESPN	No. 6	Iowa State	W 89–52	25–4 (12–2)	Allen Fieldhouse (16,300); Lawrence, Kansas
February 26; 8:00 p.m., ESPN	No. 6	at Oklahoma	W 67–65	26–4 (13–2)	Lloyd Noble Center (11,192); Norman, Oklahoma
March 3; 11:00 a.m., CBS	No. 3	No. 15 Texas	W 90–86	27–4 (14–2)	Allen Fieldhouse (16,300); Lawrence, Kansas
Big 12 tournament
March 9; 11:30 a.m., BIG 12-ESPN+ ESPNU	No. 2	vs. Oklahoma; Quarterfinals	W 64–47	28–4	Ford Center (18,879); Oklahoma City
March 10; 1:00 p.m., BIG 12-ESPN+ /ESPN2	No. 2	vs. Kansas State; Semifinals	W 67–61	29–4	Ford Center (18,879); Oklahoma City
March 11; 2:00 p.m., ESPN	No. 2	vs. No. 15 Texas; Championship	W 88–84 ^{OT}	30–4	Ford Center (18,879); Oklahoma City
NCAA tournament
March 16; 6:10 p.m., CBS	No. 2 (1)	vs. (16) Niagara; First Round	W 107–67	31–4	United Center (19,274); Chicago
March 18; 4:05 p.m., CBS	No. 2 (1)	vs. (8) Kentucky; Second Round	W 88–76	32–4	United Center (20,916); Chicago
March 22; 6:10 p.m., CBS	No. 2 (1)	vs. No. 14 (4) Southern Illinois; Sweet Sixteen	W 61–58	33–4	HP Pavilion (18,049); San Jose, California
March 24; 6:05 p.m., CBS	No. 2 (1)	vs. No. 7 (2) UCLA; Elite Eight	L 55–68	33–5	HP Pavilion (18,102); San Jose, California
*Non-conference game. ^{#}Rankings from AP Poll. (#) Tournament seedings in parentheses. All times are in Central Time.

== Awards ==
Big 12 Defensive Player of the Year
Mario Chalmers (Sophomore, Guard)
Phillips 66 Big 12 Player of the Week
Julian Wright (Sophomore, Forward), November 27 and March 5 (co-winner)
All-Big 12 First Team
Brandon Rush (Sophomore, Guard)
Julian Wright
Phillips 66 Big 12 Championship All-Tournament Team
Brandon Rush
Julian Wright
