= Matt Hill (basketball) =

American professional basketball coach

Charlotte Hornets
- Title: Assistant coach
- League: NBA

Personal information
- Listed height: 6 ft 10 in (2.08 m)
- Listed weight: 245 lb (111 kg)

Career information
- College: Texas (2006–2011)
- NBA draft: 2011: undrafted
- Position: Forward
- Coaching career: 2012–present

Career history

Coaching
- 2012–2017: Orlando Magic (video analyst/scout/player development)
- 2017–2018: Orlando Magic (assistant)
- 2018–2023: Atlanta Hawks (assistant)
- 2023–2024: Phoenix Suns (assistant)
- 2024–present: Charlotte Hornets (assistant)

Matt Hill is an American professional basketball coach who is an assistant coach for the Charlotte Hornets of the National Basketball Association (NBA).

== Coaching career ==
Hill began his coaching career as a video analyst, scout, and player development coach with the Orlando Magic under head coaches Jacque Vaughn, James Borrego, Scott Skiles, and Frank Vogel.

In 2017, Hill was promoted to the position of assistant coach with the Magic.

Hill coached as an assistant coach with the Atlanta Hawks from 2018 to 2023, coaching the Hawks NBA Summer League team in 2022.

In 2023, Hill joined the Phoenix Suns as an assistant coach. He was not retained by new head coach Mike Budenholzer during the 2024 offseason, ending his time in Phoenix.

In 2024, Hill was hired as an assistant coach with the Charlotte Hornets.
