= Cyclones.tv =

- Country: United States
- Broadcast area: Iowa

History
- Launched: August 31, 2013 (cable channel) 2012 (streaming)

Links
- Website: www.cyclones.tv

Cyclones.tv is a regional sports network and streaming network founded in 2012 (and first went on the air on August 31, 2013) to carry sports broadcasting. Cyclones.tv focuses solely on Iowa State University athletics. The channel used to carry live sporting events, but with the addition of the Big 12 Now streaming channel on ESPN+, the channel is expected to only carry game replays, coaches shows, vignettes and historical pieces. In the past, the channel would carry a wide range of third-tier events, including one non-conference football game per year, a handful of home, non-conference men's basketball games, and most of all home events in sports such as women's basketball, volleyball, softball, women's soccer and wrestling.

Iowa State athletics first started to monetize the streaming of Iowa State football games through an online portal known as CloneZone. CloneZone was used to webcast a pay-per-view version of Iowa State athletics events until 2012, when the online portal was rebranded as Cyclones.tv. Cyclones.tv existed solely as an online portal until August 31, 2013, when Mediacom unveiled a new television channel in and around the state of Iowa.

== Football Games Carried by Cyclones.tv ==
Cyclones.tv carried a total of eight football games on traditional television, with the last game coming on December 1, 2018, as Iowa State hosted Drake.

Date	Game	Streaming	Televised
September 3, 2007	Kent State @ Iowa State	as CloneZone	
September 22, 2007	Iowa State @ Toledo	as CloneZone	
August 28, 2008	South Dakota State @ Iowa State	as CloneZone	FCS
September 3, 2009	North Dakota State @ Iowa State	as CloneZone	MC22
September 26, 2009	Army @ Iowa State	as CloneZone	
September 2, 2010	Northern Illinois @ Iowa State	as CloneZone	FSN
September 25, 2010	Northern Iowa @ Iowa State	as CloneZone	MC22
September 3, 2011	Northern Iowa @ Iowa State	as CloneZone	
October 15, 2011	Iowa State @ Missouri	as CloneZone	
September 15, 2012	Western Illinois @ Iowa State	check	
August 31, 2013	Northern Iowa @ Iowa State	check	check
October 11, 2014	Toledo @ Iowa State	check	check
October 18, 2014	Iowa State @ Texas	(only in Iowa)	(on Mediacom) Longhorn Network (US)
September 5, 2015	Northern Iowa @ Iowa State	check	check
September 3, 2016	Northern Iowa @ Iowa State	check	check
October 15, 2016	Iowa State @ Texas	(only in Iowa)	(on Mediacom) Longhorn Network (US)
September 2, 2017	Northern Iowa @ Iowa State	check	check
December 1, 2018	Drake @ Iowa State	check	check
