= Seminole, Texas =

- City
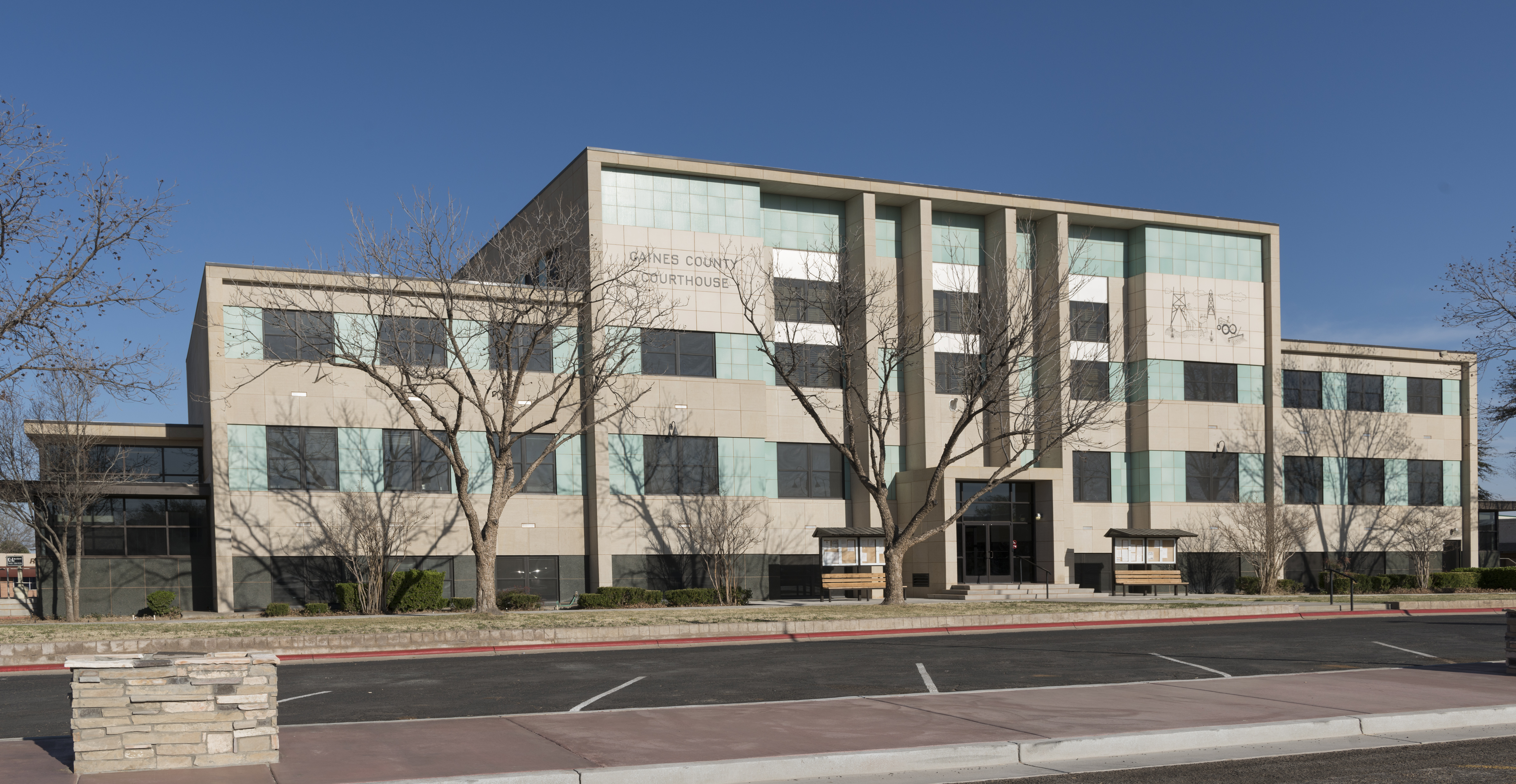
- The Gaines County Courthouse in Seminole

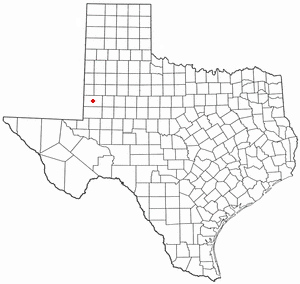
- Location of Seminole, Texas

- Coordinates: 32°43′7″N 102°39′0″W
- Country: United States
- State: Texas
- County: Gaines

Area
  - Total: 3.80 sq mi (9.83 km^{2})
  - Land: 3.80 sq mi (9.83 km^{2})
  - Water: 0 sq mi (0.00 km^{2})
- Elevation: 3,297 ft (1,005 m)

Population (2020)
  - Total: 6,988
  - Density: 2,058.4/sq mi (794.74/km^{2})
- Time zone: UTC-6 (Central (CST))
  - Summer (DST): UTC-5 (CDT)
- ZIP code: 79360
- Area code: 432
- FIPS code: 48-66764
- GNIS feature ID: 2411866
- Website: https://cityofseminoletx.org/

Seminole is a city in and the county seat of Gaines County, Texas, United States. As of the 2020 census, Seminole had a population of 6,988. Seminole and Gaines County are home to a large population of Low German Mennonites from Russia who came to West Texas in the 1980s.

It is the birthplace of country music singers Larry Gatlin and Tanya Tucker.

== History ==
The land for Seminole was donated by nonresident landowners to become the county seat for Gaines County. In 1906, the first move to Seminole was made by W. B. Austin and his wife Emma, who moved their general store there, which was located in Caput, Texas. During this time, several post offices found a new home in Seminole. Seminole National Bank opened its doors in 1906, followed by First State Bank in 1907. In 1912, Seminole National Bank lost over $3,000 when it was robbed. In 1914, the two banks merged to form First State Bank. In 1950, Seminole's population surpassed Seagraves, Texas, for the first time.

In 1977, some 100 families of Plautdietsch-speaking "Russian" Mennonites from Mexico bought land southwest of Seminole to settle there, but faced difficulties with immigration. In 1980, President Jimmy Carter signed legislation allowing the original 100 families to gain full citizenship. These Mennonites are of German, Flemish, and Frisian ancestry and became an ethnoreligious group in the Russian Empire in the 19th century. They migrated from there to Canada in the 1870s and then to Mexico in 1922. In 2016, about 6,000 of these Plautdietsch speakers lived around Seminole.

On April 6, 2025, Secretary of Health and Human Services Robert F. Kennedy Jr flew to Seminole to investigate a measles epidemic and attended the funeral of Daisy Hildebrand, aged eight.

== Geography ==
Seminole is located at 32°43′7″N 102°39′00″W.

According to the United States Census Bureau, the city has a total area of 3.3 square miles (8.5 km^{2}), all land.

=== Climate ===
Climate chart for Seminole

The climate is cold semiarid (Köppen: BSk) affected by elevation with well defined seasons, more extreme and drier than most of the great cities of Texas. The lowest temperature measured in the state of Texas (which tied an 1899 mark set in Tulia) was set in Seminole with −23 °F (−31 °C), recorded on February 8, 1933.

Climate data for Seminole, Texas (1991–2020 normals, (Note: Mean monthly maxima and minima (i.e. the highest and lowest temperature readings during an entire month or year) calculated based on data at said location from 1991 to 2020.) extremes 1922–present)
Month	Jan	Feb	Mar	Apr	May	Jun	Jul	Aug	Sep	Oct	Nov	Dec	Year
Record high °F (°C)	83 (28)	88 (31)	95 (35)	99 (37)	109 (43)	114.0 (45.6)	113 (45)	110 (43)	106 (41)	102 (39)	89 (32)	83 (28)	114.0 (45.6)
Mean maximum °F (°C)	75.4 (24.1)	79.5 (26.4)	86.4 (30.2)	92.0 (33.3)	99.1 (37.3)	104.2 (40.1)	102.3 (39.1)	101.3 (38.5)	97.5 (36.4)	91.8 (33.2)	81.8 (27.7)	74.3 (23.5)	106.1 (41.2)
Mean daily maximum °F (°C)	56.2 (13.4)	61.2 (16.2)	69.1 (20.6)	77.8 (25.4)	85.8 (29.9)	93.2 (34.0)	94.0 (34.4)	93.1 (33.9)	85.6 (29.8)	77.1 (25.1)	64.9 (18.3)	56.7 (13.7)	76.2 (24.6)
Daily mean °F (°C)	42.1 (5.6)	46.0 (7.8)	53.4 (11.9)	61.4 (16.3)	70.5 (21.4)	78.6 (25.9)	80.6 (27.0)	79.6 (26.4)	72.4 (22.4)	62.5 (16.9)	50.5 (10.3)	42.6 (5.9)	61.7 (16.5)
Mean daily minimum °F (°C)	27.9 (−2.3)	30.7 (−0.7)	37.6 (3.1)	44.9 (7.2)	55.2 (12.9)	64.1 (17.8)	67.2 (19.6)	66.2 (19.0)	59.3 (15.2)	48.0 (8.9)	36.0 (2.2)	28.6 (−1.9)	47.1 (8.4)
Mean minimum °F (°C)	15.6 (−9.1)	18.0 (−7.8)	23.4 (−4.8)	32.0 (0.0)	42.1 (5.6)	56.1 (13.4)	61.6 (16.4)	60.7 (15.9)	47.6 (8.7)	33.1 (0.6)	21.7 (−5.7)	15.0 (−9.4)	11.2 (−11.6)
Record low °F (°C)	−9 (−23)	−23 (−31)	8 (−13)	20 (−7)	28 (−2)	44 (7)	50 (10)	51 (11)	34 (1)	20 (−7)	5 (−15)	−1 (−18)	−23 (−31)
Average precipitation inches (mm)	0.69 (18)	0.72 (18)	1.01 (26)	1.05 (27)	2.23 (57)	1.92 (49)	2.05 (52)	1.78 (45)	2.75 (70)	1.33 (34)	1.00 (25)	0.68 (17)	17.21 (438)
Average snowfall inches (cm)	1.7 (4.3)	1.3 (3.3)	0.1 (0.25)	0.1 (0.25)	0.0 (0.0)	0.0 (0.0)	0.0 (0.0)	0.0 (0.0)	0.0 (0.0)	0.0 (0.0)	0.8 (2.0)	0.8 (2.0)	4.8 (12.1)
Average precipitation days (≥ 0.01 in)	3.9	4.1	3.7	3.0	4.8	5.2	5.2	5.1	5.8	4.6	3.6	3.1	52.1
Average snowy days (≥ 0.1 in)	1.0	0.7	0.0	0.1	0.0	0.0	0.0	0.0	0.0	0.0	0.3	0.7	2.8
Source 1: NOAA
Source 2: National Weather Service

== Demographics ==
Historical population
Census	Pop.	Note	%±
1940	1,761		—
1950	3,479		97.6%
1960	5,737		64.9%
1970	5,007		−12.7%
1980	6,080		21.4%
1990	6,342		4.3%
2000	5,910		−6.8%
2010	6,430		8.8%
2020	6,988		8.7%
2025 (est.)	7,730		10.6%
U.S. Decennial Census

=== 2020 census ===
As of the 2020 census, 6,988 people, 2,471 households, and 1,727 families were residing in the city. The median age was 32.4 years; 29.4% of the residents were under 18 and 12.7% were 65 or older. This relative young population is the result of typical Conservative Mennonite family traditions. For every 100 females, there were 98.7 males, and for every 100 females 18 and over, there were 95.2 males 18 and over.

All of the residents lived in urban areas, while none lived in rural areas.

Of the 2,471 households in Seminole, 41.0% had children under 18 living in them, 54.3% were married-couple households, 17.1% were households with a male householder and no spouse or partner present, and 24.6% were households with a female householder and no spouse or partner present. About 23.6% of all households were made up of individuals, and 10.3% had someone living alone who was 65 or older.

The city had 2,778 housing units, of which 11.1% were vacant. The homeowner vacancy rate was 1.9% and the rental vacancy rate was 12.7%.

Racial composition as of the 2020 census
Race	Number	Percentage
White	4,308	61.6%
Black or African American	126	1.8%
American Indian and Alaska Native	55	0.8%
Asian	62	0.9%
Native Hawaiian and other Pacific Islander	5	0.1%
Some other race	886	12.7%
Two or more races	1,546	22.1%
Hispanic or Latino (of any race)	3,357	48.0%

=== 2000 census ===
As of the census of 2000, 5,910 people, 2,082 households, and 1,590 families resided in the city. The population density was 1,762.3 inhabitants per square mile (680.4/km^{2}) . The 2,337 housing units had an average density of 696.9 per square mile (269.1/km^{2}). The racial makeup of the city was 80.64% White, 1.98% African American, 0.98% Native American, 0.29% Asian, 0.02% Pacific Islander, 13.52% from other races, and 2.57% from two or more races. Hispanics or Latinos of any race were 39.59% of the population.

Of the 2,082 households, 41.3% had children under 18 living with them, 61.6% were married couples living together, 11.2% had a female householder with no husband present, and 23.6% were not families. About 21.8% of all households were made up of individuals, and 10.2% had someone living alone who was 65 or older. The average household size was 2.79, and the average family size was 3.28.

In the city, the population was distributed as 31.9% under 18, 8.9% from 18 to 24, 27.2% from 25 to 44, 19.0% from 45 to 64, and 13.0% who were 65 or older. The median age was 32 years. For every 100 females, there were 92.5 males. For every 100 females age 18 and over, there were 89.4 males.

The median income for a household in the city was $32,063, and for a family was $36,019. Males had a median income of $31,563 versus $17,010 for females. The per capita income for the city was $14,624. About 14.6% of families and 18.2% of the population were below the poverty line, including 24.1% of those under 18 and 13.4% of those 65 or over.

== Education and library ==
The City of Seminole is served by the Seminole Independent School District. The Gaines County Library celebrated its 50th anniversary in 2008.

== Notable people ==
- Mary Ann Almager, world champion boxer, was born in Seminole.
- La Costa (born 1951), country music artist and the older sister of Tanya Tucker, was born in Seminole.
- Larry Gatlin, country and gospel music artist, was born in Seminole.
- Tanya Tucker (born 1958), country music artist, the younger sister of La Costa and two-time 2020 Grammy winner (Best Country Album and Best Country Song), was born in Seminole.
- Chris Ogden, an American college basketball coach and former player, was born in Seminole.
