= Reed Arena =

Sports arena on Texas A&M campus in College Station, Texas

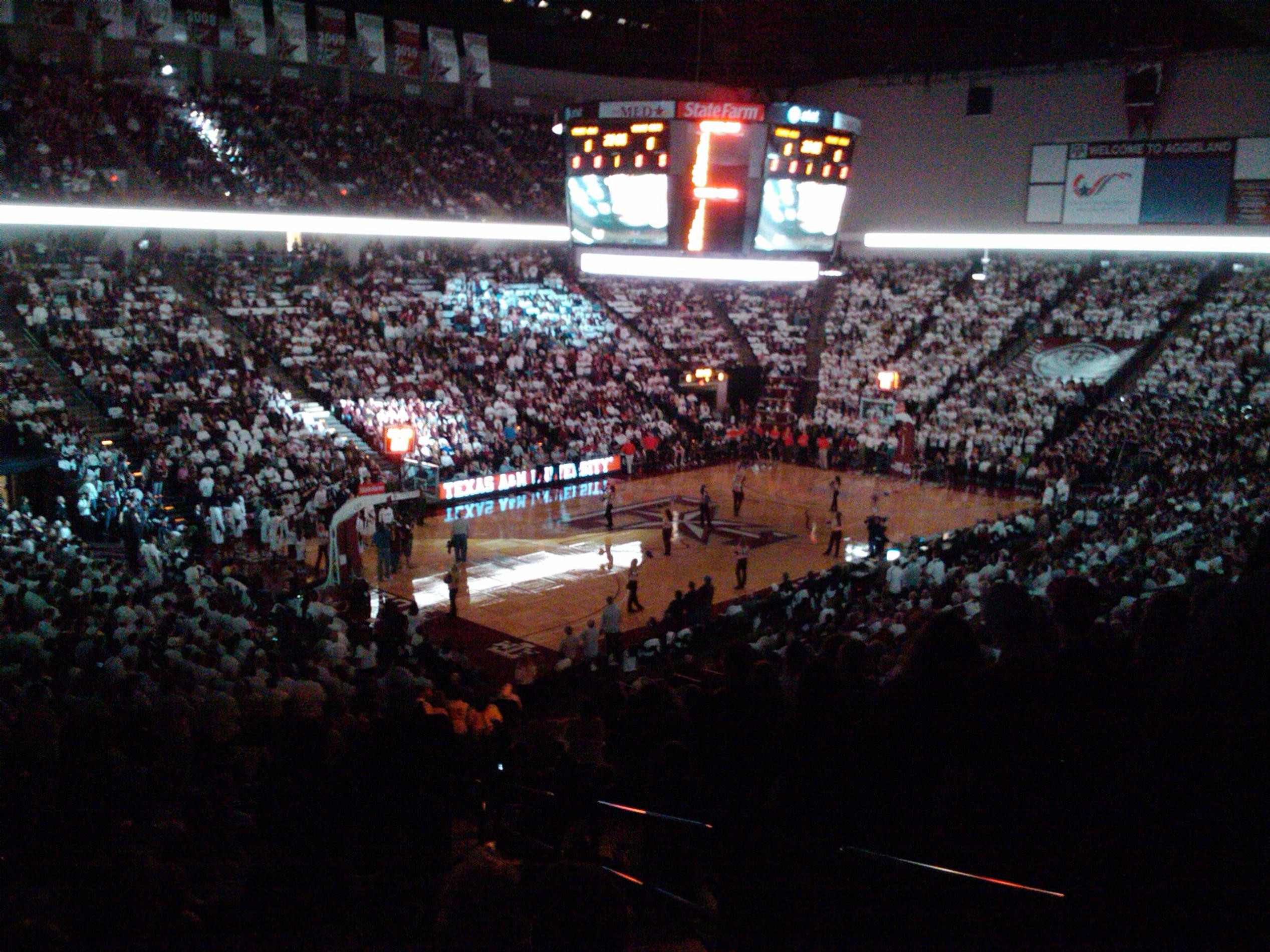
- Interactive map of Reed Arena
- Location: 730 Olsen Boulevard; College Station, Texas 77843
- Coordinates: 30.60578°N 96.34619°W
- Owner: Texas A&M University
- Operator: Texas A&M University
- Capacity: 12,989
- Surface: Hardwood

Construction
- Groundbreaking: September 16, 1995
- Opened: November 22, 1998
- Cost: $36.7 Million ($72.5 million in 2025 dollars)
- Architect: Lockwood, Andrews & Newnam, Inc.
- Structural engineers: Walter P Moore; D.Y. Davis Associates, Inc.
- Services engineers: Kalmans Marshall Engineering, Inc.
- General contractor: Huber, Hunt & Nichols, Inc.

Tenants
- Texas A&M Aggies men's basketball (NCAA) (1998–present); Texas A&M Aggies women's basketball (NCAA) (1998–present); Texas A&M Aggies volleyball (NCAA) (2009–present)

Reed Arena is a sports arena and entertainment venue located at the corner of Olsen Boulevard and Kimbrough Boulevard in College Station, Texas. This facility is used for Texas A&M University basketball games, volleyball matches, commencement ceremonies, concerts, trade shows, family entertainment, and Texas A&M student programs, including the on-campus Aggie Muster. The building replaced the G. Rollie White Coliseum, and is named for Dr. & Mrs. Chester J. Reed, a 1947 A&M graduate whose donations made the new arena possible.

In 2005, Reed Arena served as the site of men's and women's first round NIT games, as the men played Clemson and the women played Tulsa.

In recent years, Reed Arena has gained a reputation as one of the most hostile arenas in the nation, coinciding with the men's and women's Aggie basketball teams' rise to national prominence. This is partly due to a group of students calling themselves the Reed Rowdies, which have been instrumental in helping to create an energetic fan atmosphere during basketball games similar to that of football games at Kyle Field.

== Facilities ==
Reed Arena first opened its doors in 1998 as a member of Texas A&M Special Event Facilities. The arena was named after its primary donor Chester J. Reed, Texas A&M Class of 1947. The building hosts many official functions for Texas A&M University. With enough indoor seating capacity for 12,500 guests, the arena makes an ideal location for the university's graduation ceremonies, freshmen convocation, and Aggie Muster ceremonies. The main purpose behind building the arena was to house the Texas A&M's men's and women's basketball teams. However, unlike all the other athletic facilities on campus, Reed Arena operates under the Department of Finance, not the Athletic Department.

While in the planning stages, Chester Reed donated an operations endowment to help run the building during its first five years. However, due to initial over-estimating of revenue and budget shortfalls during construction, this endowment was unable to make the arena become self-sufficient. For all of these reasons mentioned above, Reed Arena cannot just focus on basketball and other university events. As a necessary function, the Arena has developed pipelines of support from a multitude of different stakeholders and events that operate both within the local community and internationally. In its many years of operation, Reed Arena has hosted a wide variety of famous performers including Bill Cosby, Garth Brooks, The Dixie Chicks, as well as the performers of WWE, Cirque du Soleil, and Ringling Brothers and Barnum & Bailey Circus.

The $36 million Reed Arena was designed by the Houston firm Lockwood, Andrews, and Newman, Inc. and built in 1998 by Dallas-based Huber, Hunt and Nichols, Inc. The arena has seats for 12,989 fans, while an additional 2,000 people can be accommodated on the main floor for concerts.

Reed Arena is able to provide group accommodations on many different levels. Events can greatly vary in size; the Arena can accommodate an event involving thousands of patrons or a small meeting that contains only 15 participants on any given day. The arena floor contains 25,000 square feet (2,300 m^{2}) of column-free space, large enough to accommodate 150 exhibit booths or a 1,800 seat banquet. This figure almost doubles the space any other building in the Bryan/College Station area. The second floor contains four 1,200 square feet (110 m^{2}) rooms, which can be used to accommodate smaller events. The lower level of the arena also contains a 7,500 square feet (700 m^{2}) multi-purpose room, a full-service commercial kitchen, and numerous types of dressing rooms.

=== Cox-McFerrin Center ===
In February 2006, the 12th Man Foundation, a fund raising organization associated with Texas A&M Athletics, announced plans for an effort to build the Cox-McFerrin Center, a 40,000-square-foot (3,700 m^{2}) addition to Reed Arena, providing new men's and women's basketball locker rooms, practice gyms, and player lounges. On February 2, 2007, the A&M System Board of Regents approved a revised plan, increasing the size of the facility to 69,400 square feet (6,450 m^{2}) and a total cost of $21.5 million.

== Attendance records ==
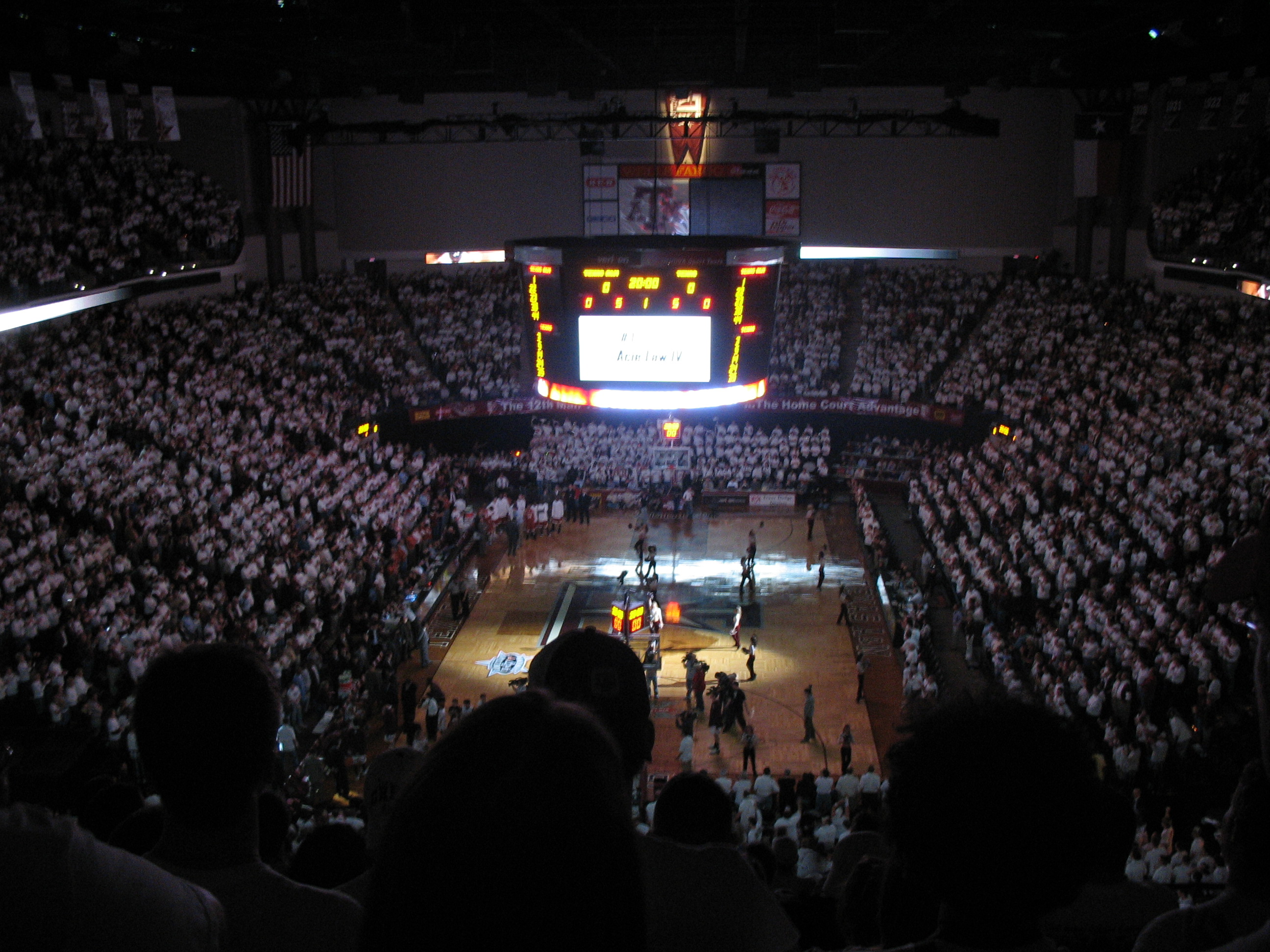
2007 Lone Star Showdown game at Reed Arena

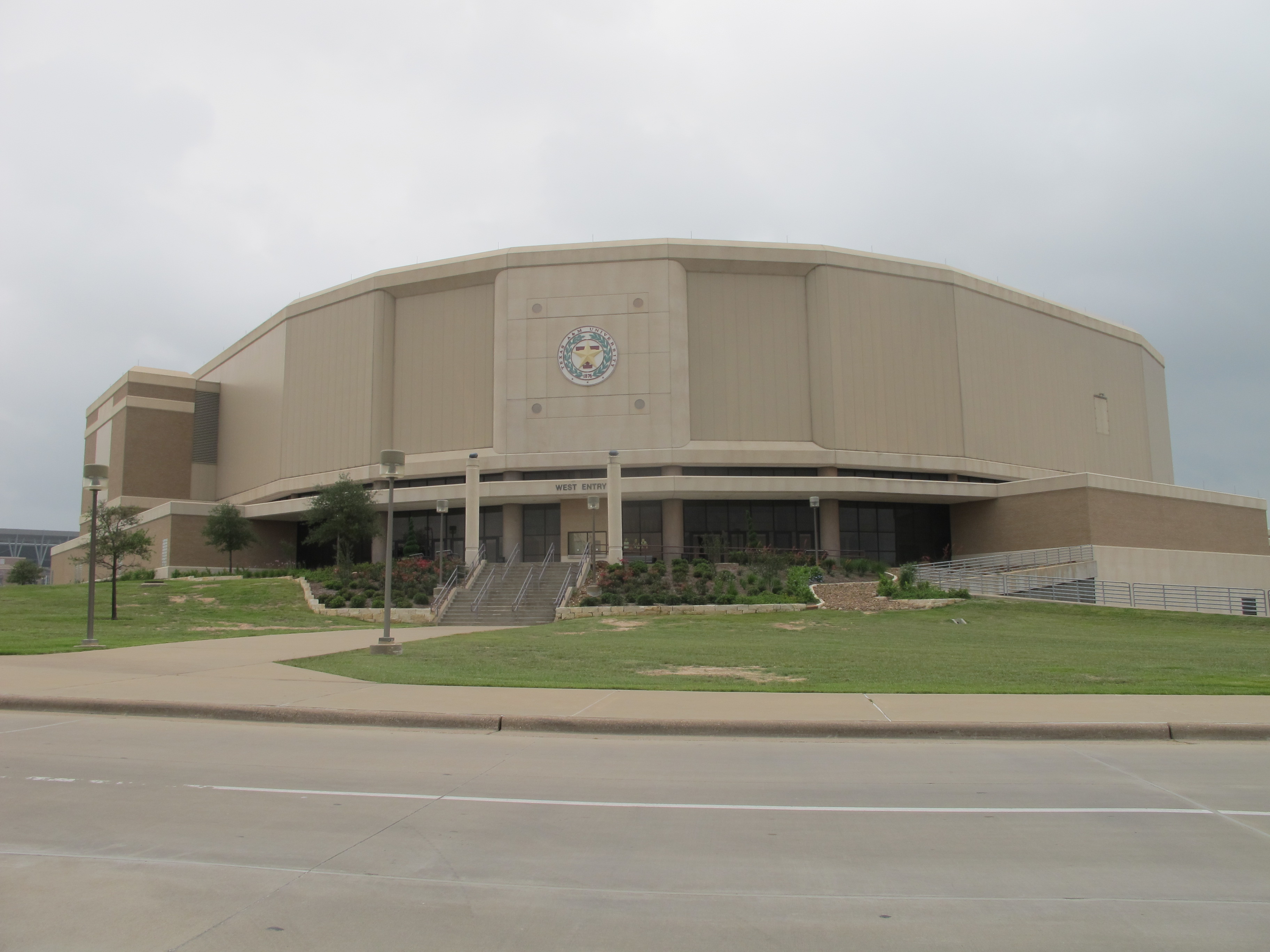
Reed Arena Exterior, 2016

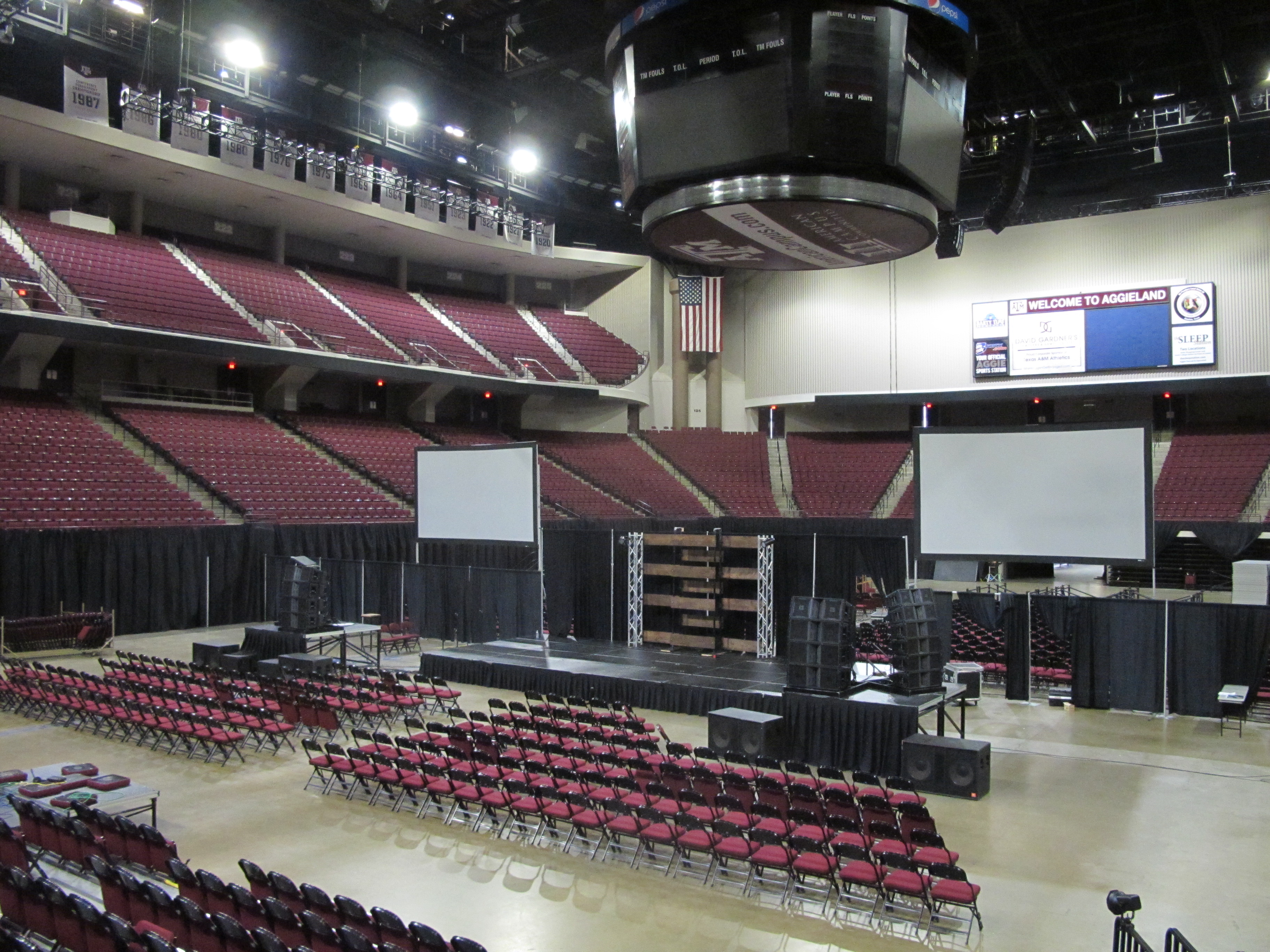
Reed Arena's Interior, 2016

13 largest men's basketball crowds:

	Attendance	Opponent	Date
1	14,036	Kentucky	January 19, 2022
2	13,888	LSU	January 19, 2016
3	13,717	Texas	February 27, 2010
4	13,657	Kansas	February 15, 2010
5	13,648	Texas Tech	January 30, 2010
6	13,584	Oklahoma State	February 16, 2008
7	13,555	Texas	January 30, 2008
8	13,300	Texas	January 31, 2011
9	13,263	Kentucky	February 10, 2018
10	13,203	Missouri	March 3, 2007
11	13,196	Texas	February 5, 2007
12	13,187	Oklahoma State	January 20, 2007
13	13,176	Texas	March 1, 2006

== See also ==
- List of NCAA Division I basketball arenas
