= 2009–10 Oklahoma Sooners men's basketball team =

American college basketball season

2009–10 Oklahoma Sooners men's basketball
- Conference: Big 12 Conference
- Record: 13–18, 13 wins vacated (4–12 Big 12, 4 wins vacated)
- Head coach: Jeff Capel
- Home arena: Lloyd Noble Center

2009–10 Big 12 men's basketball standings
	Conf.				Overall
Team	W		L	PCT	W		L	PCT
No. 1 Kansas†	15	–	1	.938	33	–	3	.917
No. 7 Kansas State	11	–	5	.688	29	–	8	.784
No. 19 Baylor	11	–	5	.688	28	–	8	.778
No. 23 Texas A&M	11	–	5	.688	24	–	10	.706
Missouri	10	–	6	.625	23	–	11	.676
Texas	9	–	7	.563	24	–	10	.706
Oklahoma State	9	–	7	.563	22	–	11	.667
Colorado	6	–	10	.375	15	–	16	.484
Texas Tech	4	–	12	.250	19	–	16	.543
Iowa State	4	–	12	.250	15	–	17	.469
Oklahoma	4	–	12	.250	13	–	18	.419
Nebraska	2	–	14	.125	15	–	18	.455
† 2010 Big 12 Tournament winner Rankings from AP poll

The 2009–10 Oklahoma Sooners men's basketball team represented the University of Oklahoma during the 2009–10 NCAA Division I men's basketball season. Their head coach was Jeff Capel, who was in his fourth year with the school. The team played its home games at the Lloyd Noble Center in Norman, OK with a capacity of 11,528 and are members of the Big 12 Conference. The Sooners finished the season 13–18, 4–12 in Big 12 play and lost in the first round of the 2010 Big 12 men's basketball tournament. They finished the season on a nine-game losing streak. All wins were subsequently vacated due to use of an ineligible player, Keith "Tiny" Gallon, who had received impermissible benefits.

== Pre-season ==
On April 19, 2009, Willie Warren announced that he would forgo the NBA draft and return of the 2009–10 season. In the offseason the Sooners lost seniors Omar Leary, Austin Johnson and Taylor Griffin and junior Blake Griffin. The younger Griffin was the number one pick in the 2009 NBA draft while the elder Griffin was pick number 48. In the pre-season Big 12 coaches' poll, which is a poll of the current head coaches in the Big 12 and not to be confused with the Coaches Poll, the Sooners were picked to finish third. The Sporting News also named Warren their preseason Player of the Year.

College recruiting
Name	Hometown	School	Height	Weight	Commit date
Andrew Fitzgerald; C	Wolfeboro, NH	Brewster Academy	6 ft 9 in (2.06 m)	245 lb (111 kg)	Oct 19, 2008
Andrew Fitzgerald; C	Recruit ratings: Scout: Rivals: (92)				
Keith Gallon; C	Mouth of Wilson, VA	Oak Hill Academy	6 ft 8 in (2.03 m)	290 lb (130 kg)	Nov 19, 2008
Keith Gallon; C	Recruit ratings: Scout: Rivals: (97)				
Kyle Hardrick; PF	Norman, OK		6 ft 7 in (2.01 m)	233 lb (106 kg)	May 20, 2006
Kyle Hardrick; PF	Recruit ratings: Scout: Rivals: (89)				
Tommy Mason-Griffin; PG	Houston, TX		5 ft 10 in (1.78 m)	206 lb (93 kg)	Jul 21, 2008
Tommy Mason-Griffin; PG	Recruit ratings: Scout: Rivals: (96)				
Steven Pledger; SG	Chesapeake, VA	Atlantic Shores Christian	6 ft 3 in (1.91 m)	185 lb (84 kg)	May 27, 2008
Steven Pledger; SG	Recruit ratings: Scout: Rivals: (91)				
Overall recruit ranking: Scout: 7 Rivals: 7
Note: In many cases, Scout, Rivals, 247Sports, On3, and ESPN may conflict in their listings of height and weight.; In these cases, the average was taken. ESPN grades are on a 100-point scale.; Sources: "Oklahoma Commit List for 2009". Rivals.; "Commits: Oklahoma". Scout.; "Oklahoma Basketball Recruiting 2009". ESPN.; "Scout.com Team Recruiting Rankings". Scout.; "2009 Team Ranking". Rivals.

== Schedule ==
2009–10 game log
November

Game	Date	Team	Score	High points	High rebounds	High assists	Location Attendance	Record
Ex.	November 3	British Columbia	93–53	Willie Warren (23)	Tiny Gallon (9)	Willie Warren & Tommy Mason-Griffin (5)	Lloyd Noble Center, Norman, OK; 8,246	
1	November 14	Mount St. Mary's	95-71	Steven Pledger (21)	Tiny Gallon (15)	Willie Warren (11)	Lloyd Noble Center, Norman, OK; 10,490	1–0
2	November 17	Louisiana–Monroe	72–61	Willie Warren (24)	Tiny Gallon (10)	Tommy Mason-Griffin (5)	Lloyd Noble Center, Norman, OK; 9,575	2–0
3	November 21	VCU	69–82	Tony Crocker (19)	Tiny Gallon (11)	Tommy Mason-Griffin (6)	Stuart C. Siegel Center, Richmond, VA	2–1
4	November 25	San Diego	64–76	Willie Warren (30)	Orlando Allen (7)	Tommy Mason-Griffin (5)	Sullivan Arena, Anchorage, AK	2–2
5	November 26	Houston	93–100	Willie Warren (25)	Tony Crocker (10)	Willie Warren (7)	Sullivan Arena, Anchorage, AK	2–3
6	November 28	Nicholls State	81–60	Cade Davis (18)	Tiny Gallon (12)	Tommy Mason-Griffin (6)	Sullivan Arena, Anchorage, AK	3–3

December

Game	Date	Team	Score	High points	High rebounds	High assists	Location Attendance	Record
7	December 2	Arkansas	67–47	Tony Crocker (16)	Tony Crocker (16)	Willie Warren (4)	Lloyd Noble Center, Norman, OK; 10,612	4–3
8	December 6	Arizona	67–47	Willie Warren (25)	Tiny Gallon (7)	Tommy Mason-Griffin (6)	Lloyd Noble Center, Norman, OK; 10,030	5–3
9	December 9	Centenary College	86–62	Tony Crocker (33)	Tiny Gallon (15)	Tommy Mason-Griffin (7)	Lloyd Noble Center, Norman, OK; 9,456	6–3
10	December 12	Utah	78–73 (OT)	Willie Warren (27)	Tony Crocker (10)	Willie Warren (4)	Jon M. Huntsman Center, Salt Lake City, UT; 9,268	7–3
11	December 19	Northern Colorado	80–79	Cade Davis (25)	Tony Crocker (10)	Tommy Mason-Griffin & Willie Warren (4)	Lloyd Noble Center, Norman, OK; 10,528	8–3
12	December 21	UTEP	74–89	Willie Warren (26)	Tiny Gallon & Tony Crocker (8)	Willie Warren (4)	Ford Center, Oklahoma City, OK	8–4
13	December 31	#22 Gonzaga	69–83	Willie Warren (19)	Andrew Fitzgerald & Tiny Gallon (5)	Tommy Mason-Griffin (10)	Spokane Arena, Spokane, WA; 11,452	8–5

January

Game	Date	Team	Score	High points	High rebounds	High assists	Location Attendance	Record
14	January 4	Maryland Eastern Shore	88–54	Cade Davis (19)	Tony Crocker & Tiny Gallon (12)	Tommy Mason-Griffin (7)	Lloyd Noble Center, Norman, OK; 9,402	9–5
15	January 9	Baylor	60–91	Tiny Gallon (17)	Tiny Gallon & Willie Warren (5)	Tony Crocker (5)	Ferrell Center, Waco, TX; 8,757	9–6 (0–1)
16	January 11	Oklahoma State	62–57	Willie Warren (15)	Tiny Gallon (18)	Willie Warren (7)	Lloyd Noble Center, Norman, OK; 11,143	10–6 (1–1)
17	January 16	Missouri	66–61	Willie Warren (21)	Cade Davis (11)	Willie Warren & Tommy Mason-Griffin (5)	Lloyd Noble Center, Norman, OK; 12,384	11–6 (2–1)
18	January 19	Texas A&M	62–65	Tommy Mason-Griffin (21)	Cade Davis & Tiny Gallon (7)	Tommy Mason-Griffin (5)	Reed Arena, College Station, TX; 11,109	11–7 (2–2)
19	January 23	Texas Tech	65–75	Tommy Mason-Griffin (28)	Tony Crocker (13)	Cade Davis (3)	United Spirit Arena, Lubbock, TX; 10,408	11–8 (2–3)
20	January 27	Iowa State	89–84	Tommy Mason-Griffin (38)	Ray Willis (7)	Tommy Mason-Griffin (6)	Lloyd Noble Center, Norman, OK; 9,468	12–8 (3–3)
21	January 30	Nebraska	46–63	Cade Davis (13)	Ryan Wright (8)	Tommy Mason-Griffin (4)	Bob Devaney Sports Center, Lincoln, NE; 8,040	12–9 (3–4)

February

Game	Date	Team	Score	High points	High rebounds	High assists	Location Attendance	Record
22	February 6	#10 Texas	71–80	Thomas Mason-Griffin (24)	Ryan Wright (14)	Thomas Mason-Griffin (4)	Lloyd Noble Center, Norman, OK; 12,036	13–9 (4–4)
23	February 9	Texas Tech	71–72	Willie Warren (18)	Tony Crocker (11)	Willie Warren (5)	Lloyd Noble Center, Norman, OK; 10,323	13–10 (4–5)
24	February 13	Oklahoma State	76–97	Thomas Mason-Griffin (30)	Ray Willis (7)	Thomas Mason-Griffin (5)	Gallagher-Iba Arena, Stillwater, OK; 12,380	13–11 (4–6)
25	February 17	Colorado	67–77	Thomas Mason-Griffin & Willie Warren (19)	Tiny Gallon (10)	Tony Crocker & Thomas Mason-Griffin (3)	Coors Events Center, Boulder, CO; 5,976	13–12 (4–7)
26	February 20	#7 Kansas State	68–83	Thomas Mason-Griffin (16)	Tony Crocker (9)	Thomas Mason-Griffin & Tony Crocker (5)	Lloyd Noble Center, Norman, OK; 12,425	13–13 (4–8)
27	February 22	#1 Kansas	68–81	Thomas Mason-Griffin (17)	Cade Daivs (8)	Thomas Mason-Griffin (8)	Allen Fieldhouse, Lawrence, KS; 16,300	13–14 (4–9)
28	February 27	#24 Baylor	63–70	Tiny Gallon (23)	Tiny Gallon (15)	Thomas Mason-Griffin (8)	Lloyd Noble Center, Norman, OK; 7,894	13–15 (4–10)

March

Game	Date	Team	Score	High points	High rebounds	High assists	Location Attendance	Record
29	March 1	Texas	76–87	Tony Crocker (24)	Tiny Gallon (9)	Thomas Mason-Griffin (7)	Frank Erwin Center, Austin, TX; 16,012	13–16 (4–11)
30	March 6	#23 Texas A&M	54–69	Thomas Mason-Griffin (16)	Cade Davis (7)	Cade Davis & Thomas Mason-Griffin (4)	Lloyd Noble Center, Norman, OK; 11,074	13–17 (4–12)
31	March 10	Oklahoma State; Big 12 tournament	67–81	Thomas Mason-Griffin (22)	Tiny Gallon, Tony Crocker, & Cade Davis (6)	Thomas Mason-Griffin (9)	Sprint Center, Kansas City, MO; 18,879	13–18

2009–10 season schedule

== Roster ==
2009–10 Oklahoma Sooners men's basketball team
Players
Coaches

Pos.	#	Name	Height	Weight	Year	Hometown
F	1	Ryan Wright	6 ft 9 in (2.06 m)	241 lb (109 kg)	Sr	Mississauga, Ontario
G	2	Steven Pledger	6 ft 4 in (1.93 m)	217 lb (98 kg)	Fr	Chesapeake, Virginia
G	3	T. J. Franklin	5 ft 11 in (1.8 m)	166 lb (75 kg)	So	Fort Worth, Texas
F	4	Andrew Fitzgerald	6 ft 8 in (2.03 m)	258 lb (117 kg)	Fr	Baltimore, Maryland
G	5	Tony Crocker	6 ft 6 in (1.98 m)	209 lb (95 kg)	Sr	San Antonio, Texas
G	11	Tommy Mason-Griffin	5 ft 11 in (1.8 m)	206 lb (93 kg)	Fr	Houston, Texas
G	13	Willie Warren	6 ft 4 in (1.93 m)	203 lb (92 kg)	So	Fort Worth, Texas
F	15	Barry Honoré	6 ft 7 in (2.01 m)	268 lb (122 kg)	Jr	Garland, Texas
C	21	Orlando Allen	6 ft 10 in (2.08 m)	288 lb (131 kg)	Jr	Cincinnati, Ohio
G	22	Ryan Randolph	6 ft 4 in (1.93 m)	191 lb (87 kg)	Fr	Oklahoma City, Oklahoma
F	24	Tiny Gallon	6 ft 9 in (2.06 m)	296 lb (134 kg)	Fr	Vallejo, California
F	25	Kyle Hardrick	6 ft 8 in (2.03 m)	229 lb (104 kg)	Fr	Oklahoma City, Oklahoma
G	34	Cade Davis	6 ft 5 in (1.96 m)	199 lb (90 kg)	Jr	Elk City, Oklahoma
G	41	Ray Willis	6 ft 6 in (1.98 m)	164 lb (74 kg)	So	Atlanta, Georgia
F	45	Beau Gerber	6 ft 8 in (2.03 m)	227 lb (103 kg)	Sr	Winfield, Kansas

Head coach

- Jeff Capel (Duke)

Assistant coach(es)

- Ben Betts (Roanoke)
- Mark Cline (Wake Forest)
- Oronde Taliaferro (Wayne State (MI))

Legend

- (C) Team captain
- (S) Suspended
- (I) Ineligible
- (W) Walk-on
- Injured
- Current redshirt

Roster
Last update: 2009-11-05

== Rankings ==
Poll	Pre	Wk 1	Wk 2	Wk 3	Wk 4	Wk 5	Wk 6	Wk 7	Wk 8	Wk 9	Wk 10	Wk 11	Wk 12	Wk 13	Wk 14	Wk 15	Wk 16	Wk 17	Wk 18	Wk 19	Final
AP	17	17	25	--	--	--	--	--	--	--	--	--	--	--	--	--	--	--	--	--	--
Coaches	16	17	--	--	--	--	--	--	--	--	--	--	--	--	--	--	--	--	--	--	--
