= 2009–10 Big 12 Conference men's basketball season =

- League: NCAA Division I
- Sport: Basketball
- Duration: January 9, 2010 through March 6, 2010
- Teams: 12

Regular Season
- Regular Season Champion: Kansas
- Season MVP: James Anderson

Tournament
- Champions: Kansas
- Runners-up: Kansas State
- Finals MVP: Sherron Collins

Basketball seasons
- 2008–09 2010–11

2009–10 Big 12 men's basketball standings
	Conf.				Overall
Team	W		L	PCT	W		L	PCT
No. 1 Kansas†	15	–	1	.938	33	–	3	.917
No. 7 Kansas State	11	–	5	.688	29	–	8	.784
No. 19 Baylor	11	–	5	.688	28	–	8	.778
No. 23 Texas A&M	11	–	5	.688	24	–	10	.706
Missouri	10	–	6	.625	23	–	11	.676
Texas	9	–	7	.563	24	–	10	.706
Oklahoma State	9	–	7	.563	22	–	11	.667
Colorado	6	–	10	.375	15	–	16	.484
Texas Tech	4	–	12	.250	19	–	16	.543
Iowa State	4	–	12	.250	15	–	17	.469
Oklahoma	4	–	12	.250	13	–	18	.419
Nebraska	2	–	14	.125	15	–	18	.455
† 2010 Big 12 Tournament winner Rankings from AP poll

The 2009–10 Big 12 Conference men's basketball season marks the 14th season of Big 12 Conference basketball.

== Preseason ==
=== Big 12 Coaches Poll ===
Rank	Team	Votes
1	Kansas (11)	121
2	Texas (1)	111
3	Oklahoma	95
4	Kansas State	92
5	Texas A&M	74
6	Oklahoma State	69
7	Missouri	66
8	Iowa State	57
9	Texas Tech	34
10	Baylor	33
11	Nebraska	27
12	Colorado	13

=== All-Big 12 players ===
- Sherron Collins, Kansas
- Willie Warren, Oklahoma
- Damion James, Texas
- Craig Brackins, Iowa State
- James Anderson, Oklahoma State
- Cole Aldrich, Kansas

Player of the Year

- James Anderson, Oklahoma State

Newcomer of the Year

- Marquis Gilstrap, Iowa State

Freshman of the Year

- Avery Bradley, Texas

== Regular season ==
=== Rankings ===
AP Poll	Pre	Wk 1	Wk 2	Wk 3	Wk 4	Wk 5	Wk 6	Wk 7	Wk 8	Wk 9	Wk 10	Wk 11	Wk 12	Wk 13	Wk 14	Wk 15	Wk 16	Wk 17	Wk 18
Baylor			RV		RV	RV	RV	RV	RV	22	25	24	20	24	22	24	21	21	19
Colorado																			
Iowa State																			
Kansas	1	1	1	1	1	1	1	1	1	3	3	2	1	1	1	1	2	1	1
Kansas State	RV	RV	RV	RV	RV	17	12	12	11	13	10	11	10	9	7	6	5	9	7
Missouri	RV	RV	RV	RV						RV	RV	RV	RV	RV		RV	RV		
Nebraska																			
Oklahoma	17	17	25																
Oklahoma State	RV	RV	RV	RV	RV	RV	RV	RV	RV	RV		RV	RV			RV	RV	RV	
Texas	3	3	3	2	2	2	2	2	2	1	1	6	9	14	15	21	RV	RV	RV
Texas A&M	RV	RV	RV	19	16	23	19	RV	RV	RV	RV	RV		RV	24	22	23	23	23
Texas Tech				RV	23	16	23	20	22	RV									

=== In-season honors ===
Players of the week

Throughout the conference regular season, the Big 12 offices name a player of the week each Monday.

== National awards & honors ==
=== Academic All-American of the Year ===
Cole Aldrich, Kansas

- CoSIDA

== See also ==
- 2009–10 NCAA Division I men's basketball season
- 2010 Big 12 men's basketball tournament
