= 2009–10 Texas Longhorns men's basketball team =

American college basketball season

2009–10 Texas Longhorns men's basketball

NCAA tournament, Round of 64
- Conference: Big 12
- South
- Record: 24–10 (9–7 Big 12)
- Head coach: Rick Barnes
- Assistant coaches: Rodney Terry; Russell Springmann; Chris Ogden
- Home arena: Frank Erwin Center

2009–10 Big 12 men's basketball standings
| | Conf. | | | | Overall |
| Team | W | | L | PCT | W | | L | PCT |
|---|---|---|---|---|---|---|---|---|
| No. 1 Kansas† | 15 | – | 1 | .938 | 33 | – | 3 | .917 |
| No. 7 Kansas State | 11 | – | 5 | .688 | 29 | – | 8 | .784 |
| No. 19 Baylor | 11 | – | 5 | .688 | 28 | – | 8 | .778 |
| No. 23 Texas A&M | 11 | – | 5 | .688 | 24 | – | 10 | .706 |
| Missouri | 10 | – | 6 | .625 | 23 | – | 11 | .676 |
| Texas | 9 | – | 7 | .563 | 24 | – | 10 | .706 |
| Oklahoma State | 9 | – | 7 | .563 | 22 | – | 11 | .667 |
| Colorado | 6 | – | 10 | .375 | 15 | – | 16 | .484 |
| Texas Tech | 4 | – | 12 | .250 | 19 | – | 16 | .543 |
| Iowa State | 4 | – | 12 | .250 | 15 | – | 17 | .469 |
| Oklahoma | 4 | – | 12 | .250 | 13 | – | 18 | .419 |
| Nebraska | 2 | – | 14 | .125 | 15 | – | 18 | .455 |
† 2010 Big 12 Tournament winner Rankings from AP poll

The 2009–10 Texas Longhorns men's basketball team represented the University of Texas in the 2009-10 NCAA Division I men's basketball season. Their head coach was Rick Barnes, who was in his 12th year. The team played its home games at the Frank Erwin Center in Austin, Texas and were members of the Big 12 Conference. The Longhorns finished the season 24–10, 9–7 in Big 12 play and lost in the first round of the 2010 Big 12 men's basketball tournament. They received an at-large bid to the 2010 NCAA Division I men's basketball tournament, earning an 8 seed in the East Region. They were defeated in the first round by 9 seed Wake Forest in overtime.

== Recruiting ==
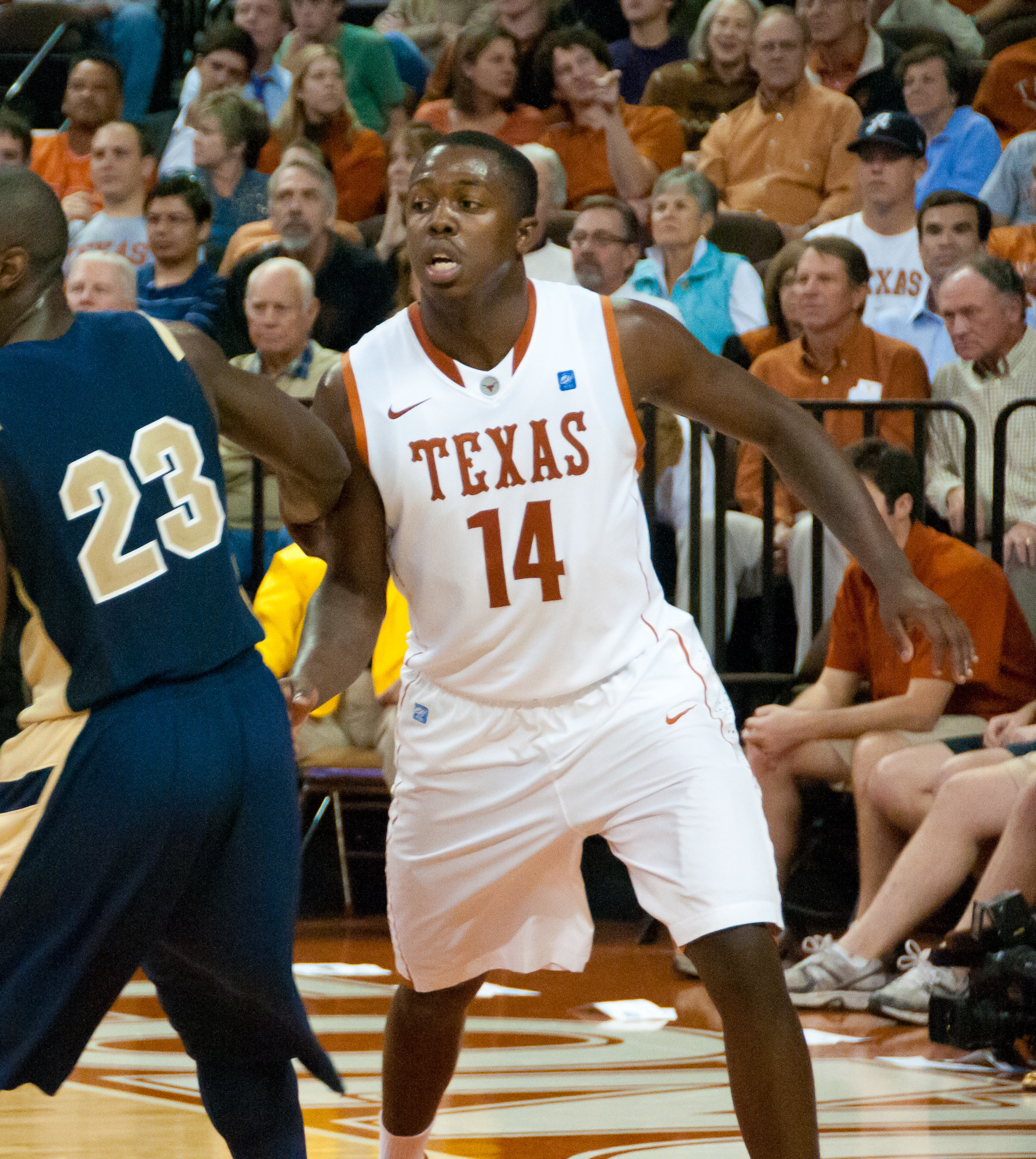
J'Covan Brown

College recruiting
| Name | Hometown | School | Height | Weight | Commit date |
|---|---|---|---|---|---|
| Avery Bradley; SG | Henderson, NV | Findlay Prep | 6 ft 3 in (1.91 m) | 170 lb (77 kg) | Sep 17, 2008 |
| Avery Bradley; SG | Recruit ratings: Scout: Rivals: (98) | | | | |
| Jordan Hamilton; SF | Compton, CA | Dominguez HS | 6 ft 7 in (2.01 m) | 210 lb (95 kg) | Oct 9, 2008 |
| Jordan Hamilton; SF | Recruit ratings: Scout: Rivals: (98) | | | | |
| Shawn Williams; SF | Duncanville, TX | Duncanville HS | 6 ft 6 in (1.98 m) | 200 lb (91 kg) | Aug 7, 2008 |
| Shawn Williams; SF | Recruit ratings: Scout: Rivals: (93) | | | | |
Overall recruit ranking: Scout: 6 Rivals: 3 ESPN: 4
Note: In many cases, Scout, Rivals, 247Sports, On3, and ESPN may conflict in their listings of height and weight.; In these cases, the average was taken. ESPN grades are on a 100-point scale.; Sources: "Texas 2009 Basketball Commitments". Rivals.; "2009 Texas Basketball Commits". Scout.; "ESPN". ESPN.; "Scout.com Team Recruiting Rankings". Scout.; "2009 Team Ranking". Rivals.

== Schedule ==
| Date time, TV | Rank^{#} | Opponent^{#} | Result | Record | Site (attendance) city, state |
Regular season
| 11/15/2009*; 1:00 pm, ESPNU | No. 3 | UC Irvine; O'Reilly Auto Parts CBE Classic Regional Round | W 89-42 | 1–0 | Frank Erwin Center (6,471); Austin, TX |
| 11/18/2009*; 8:00 pm, ESPNU | No. 3 | Western Carolina; O'Reilly Auto Parts CBE Classic Regional Round | W 73–41 | 2–0 | Frank Erwin Center (11,317); Austin, TX |
| 11/23/2009*; 9:00 pm, ESPN2 | No. 3 | vs. Iowa; O'Reilly Auto Parts CBE Classic Semifinals | W 85–60 | 3–0 | Sprint Center (7,226); Kansas City, MO |
| 11/24/2009*; 9:25 pm, ESPN2 | No. 3 | vs. Pittsburgh; O'Reilly Auto Parts CBE Classic Championship Game | W 78–62 | 4–0 | Sprint Center (8,076); Kansas City, MO |
| 11/28/2009*; 3:00 pm, CBS | No. 3 | at Rice | W 77–59 | 5–0 | Tudor Fieldhouse (4,669); Houston, TX |
| 12/03/2009*; 8:00 pm, ESPN2 | No. 2 | Southern California; Big 12/Pac-10 Hardwood Series | W 69–50 | 6–0 | Frank Erwin Center (14,423); Austin, TX |
| 12/07/2009*; 8:00 pm, ESPNU | No. 2 | Long Beach State | W 107–74 | 7–0 | Frank Erwin Center (11,194); Austin, TX |
| 12/12/2009*; 3:00 pm, ESPN Full Court | No. 2 | Texas State | W 87–54 | 8–0 | Frank Erwin Center (14,304); Austin, TX |
| 12/15/2009*; 7:00 pm, ESPN Full Court | No. 2 | Texas-Pan American | W 104–42 | 9–0 | Frank Erwin Center (11,548); Austin, TX |
| 12/19/2009*; 1:00 pm, ESPN | No. 2 | vs. No. 10 North Carolina | W 103–90 | 10–0 | Cowboys Stadium (38,052); Arlington, TX |
| 12/22/09*; 6:00 pm, ESPN2 | No. 2 | No. 9 Michigan State | W 79–68 | 11–0 | Frank Erwin Center (16,734); Austin, TX |
| 12/29/09*; 5:00 pm, ESPN Full Court | No. 2 | Gardner-Webb | W 95–63 | 12–0 | Frank Erwin Center (14,804); Austin, TX |
| 01/02/09*; 3:30 pm, ESPN Full Court | No. 2 | Texas A&M-Corpus Christi | W 76–70 | 13–0 | Frank Erwin Center (13,584); Austin, TX |
| 01/05/09*; 6:00 pm, ESPN2 | No. 2 | at Arkansas | W 96–85 | 14–0 | Bud Walton Arena (12,865); Fayetteville, AR |
| 01/09/09; 12:45 pm, Big 12 (ESPN+) | No. 2 | Colorado | W 103–86 | 15–0 (1–0) | Frank Erwin Center (15,146); Austin, TX |
| 01/13/10; 7:00 pm, Big 12 (ESPN+) | No. 1 | at Iowa State | W 90–83 | 16–0 (2–0) | Hilton Coliseum (12,066); Ames, IA |
| 01/16/10; 5:00 pm, ESPNU | No. 1 | Texas A&M; State Farm Lone Star Showdown | W 72–67 ^{(OT)} | 17–0 (3–0) | Frank Erwin Center (16,734); Austin, TX |
| 01/18/10; 8:00 pm, ESPN | No. 1 | at No. 10 Kansas State | L 62–71 | 17–1 (3–1) | Bramlage Coliseum (12,528); Manhattan, KS |
| 01/23/10*; 3:00 pm, CBS | No. 1 | at Connecticut | L 74–88 | 17–2 (3–1) | Harry A. Gampel Pavilion (10,167); Storrs, CT |
| 01/27/10; 8:00 pm, ESPN | No. 6 | Texas Tech | W 95–83 | 18–2 (4–1) | Frank Erwin Center (16,414); Austin, TX |
| 01/30/10; 3:00 pm, Big 12 (ESPN+) | No. 6 | No. 24 Baylor | L 77–80 | 18–3 (4–2) | Frank Erwin Center (16,734); Austin, TX |
| 02/01/10; 8:00 pm, ESPN | No. 10 | at Oklahoma State | W 72–60 | 19–3 (5–2) | Gallagher-Iba Arena (11,096); Stillwater, OK |
| 02/06/10; 3:00 pm, ESPN | No. 10 | at Oklahoma | L 71–80 | 19–4 (5–3) | Lloyd Noble Center (12,036); Norman, OK |
| 02/08/10; 8:00 pm, ESPN | No. 14 | No. 1 Kansas | L 68–80 | 19–5 (5–4) | Frank Erwin Center (16,755); Austin, TX |
| 02/13/10; 3:30 pm, Big 12 (ESPN+) | No. 14 | Nebraska | W 91–51 | 20–5 (6–4) | Frank Erwin Center (16,734); Austin, TX |
| 02/17/10; 8:00 pm, ESPN2 | No. 17 | at Missouri | L 77–82 | 20–6 (6–5) | Mizzou Arena (14,389); Columbia, MO |
| 02/20/10; 1:00 pm, ESPN | No. 17 | at Texas Tech | W 71–67 | 21–6 (7–5) | United Spirit Arena (12,481); Lubbock, TX |
| 02/24/10; 8:00 pm, ESPN2 | No. 21 | Oklahoma State | W 69–59 | 22–6 (8–5) | Frank Erwin Center (15,052); Austin, TX |
| 02/27/10; 1:00 pm, ESPN | No. 21 | at No. 22 Texas A&M; State Farm Lone Star Showdown | L 58–74 | 22–7 (8–6) | Reed Arena (13,717); College Station, TX |
| 03/01/10; 8:00 pm, ESPN | | Oklahoma | W 87–76 | 23–7 (9–6) | Frank Erwin Center (16,012); Austin, TX |
| 03/06/10; 3:00 pm, ESPN | | at No. 21 Baylor | L 77–92 | 23–8 (9–7) | Ferrell Center (10,562); Waco, TX |
2010 Big 12 men's basketball tournament
| 03/10/10; 8:30 pm, Big 12 (ESPN+) | | vs. Iowa State; First Round | W 82–75 | 24–8 | Sprint Center (18,879); Kansas City, MO |
| 03/11/10; 8:30 pm, Big 12 (ESPN+) | | vs. No. 21 Baylor; Quarterfinals | L 67–86 | 24–9 | Sprint Center (18,879); Kansas City, MO |
2010 NCAA Division I men's basketball tournament
| 03/18/10*; 8:35 pm, CBS | | vs. Wake Forest; First round | L 80–81 ^{OT} | 24–10 | New Orleans Arena (10,984); New Orleans, LA |
*Non-conference game. ^{#}Rankings from AP Poll. (#) Tournament seedings in parentheses. All times are in Central Time.

== Rankings ==
Ranking movements Legend: ██ Increase in ranking ██ Decrease in ranking RV = Received votes ( ) = First-place votes
| | Week | | | | | | | | | | | | | | | | | | | |
| Poll | Pre | 1 | 2 | 3 | 4 | 5 | 6 | 7 | 8 | 9 | 10 | 11 | 12 | 13 | 14 | 15 | 16 | 17 | 18 | Final |
|---|---|---|---|---|---|---|---|---|---|---|---|---|---|---|---|---|---|---|---|---|
| AP | 3 (1) | 3 (1) | 3 (1) | 2 (1) | 2 (1) | 2 (1) | 2 (7) | 2 (11) | 2 (8) | 1 (56) | 1 (57) | 6 | 9 | 14 | 15 | 21 | RV | RV | RV | Not released |
| Coaches | 3 | 3 | 3 | 2 | 2 | 2 | 2 | 2 (3) | 2 (1) | 1 (30) | 1 (30) | 6 | 10 | 14 | 17 | 21 | 25 | RV | RV | RV |

== Roster ==
2009–10 Texas Longhorns men's basketball team
Players
Coaches

| Pos. | # | Name | Height | Weight | Year | Hometown |
|---|---|---|---|---|---|---|
| G | 0 | Avery Bradley | 6 ft 2 in (1.88 m) | 180 lb (82 kg) | Fr | Tacoma, Washington |
| F | 1 | Gary Johnson | 6 ft 6 in (1.98 m) | 238 lb (108 kg) | Jr | Houston, Texas |
| G | 2 | Shawn Williams | 6 ft 6 in (1.98 m) | 215 lb (98 kg) | Fr | Duncanville, Texas |
| G | 4 | Dogus Balbay | 6 ft 1 in (1.85 m) | 175 lb (79 kg) | Jr | Istanbul, Turkey |
| F | 5 | Damion James | 6 ft 7 in (2.01 m) | 225 lb (102 kg) | Sr | Nacogdoches, Texas |
| G | 10 | Jai Lucas | 5 ft 10 in (1.78 m) | 150 lb (68 kg) | Jr | Houston, Texas |
| G | 14 | J'Covan Brown | 6 ft 1 in (1.85 m) | 185 lb (84 kg) | Fr | Port Arthur, Texas |
| F | 20 | Alexis Wangmene | 6 ft 7 in (2.01 m) | 241 lb (109 kg) | So | Maroua, Cameroon |
| C | 21 | Matt Hill | 6 ft 10 in (2.08 m) | 240 lb (109 kg) | Jr | Lincoln, Nebraska |
| G | 22 | Andrew Dick | 6 ft 2 in (1.88 m) | 180 lb (82 kg) | Fr | Sherman, Texas |
| F | 23 | Jordan Hamilton | 6 ft 7 in (2.01 m) | 226 lb (103 kg) | Fr | Los Angeles, California |
| G | 24 | Justin Mason | 6 ft 2 in (1.88 m) | 195 lb (88 kg) | Sr | Amarillo, Texas |
| G | 25 | Dean Melchionni | 6 ft 4 in (1.93 m) | 185 lb (84 kg) | Fr | Lancaster, Pennsylvania |
| C | 34 | Dexter Pittman | 6 ft 10 in (2.08 m) | 290 lb (132 kg) | Sr | Rosenberg, Texas |
| G | 50 | Varez Ward | 6 ft 2 in (1.88 m) | 190 lb (86 kg) | So | Montgomery, Alabama |
| C | 53 | Clint Chapman | 6 ft 10 in (2.08 m) | 239 lb (108 kg) | Jr | Canby, Oregon |

Head coach

- Rick Barnes (Lenoir–Rhyne)

Assistant coach(es)

- Rodney Terry (St. Edward's)
- Russell Springmann (Salisbury)
- Christopher Ogden (Texas)

Legend

- (C) Team captain
- (S) Suspended
- (I) Ineligible
- (W) Walk-on
- Injured
- Current redshirt

Roster
Last update: 2009-11-06
