= 2009–10 Missouri Tigers men's basketball team =

American college basketball season

2009–10 Missouri Tigers men's basketball

NCAA tournament, Round of 32
- Conference: Big 12
- North
- Record: 23–11 (10–6 Big 12)
- Head coach: Mike Anderson
- Assistant coaches: Melvin Watkins; Matt Zimmerman; T.J. Cleveland
- Home arena: Mizzou Arena

2009–10 Big 12 men's basketball standings
	Conf.				Overall
Team	W		L	PCT	W		L	PCT
No. 1 Kansas†	15	–	1	.938	33	–	3	.917
No. 7 Kansas State	11	–	5	.688	29	–	8	.784
No. 19 Baylor	11	–	5	.688	28	–	8	.778
No. 23 Texas A&M	11	–	5	.688	24	–	10	.706
Missouri	10	–	6	.625	23	–	11	.676
Texas	9	–	7	.563	24	–	10	.706
Oklahoma State	9	–	7	.563	22	–	11	.667
Colorado	6	–	10	.375	15	–	16	.484
Texas Tech	4	–	12	.250	19	–	16	.543
Iowa State	4	–	12	.250	15	–	17	.469
Oklahoma	4	–	12	.250	13	–	18	.419
Nebraska	2	–	14	.125	15	–	18	.455
† 2010 Big 12 Tournament winner Rankings from AP poll

The 2009–10 Missouri Tigers men's basketball team represented the University of Missouri in the 2009–10 NCAA Division I men's basketball season. Their head coach was Mike Anderson, who was in his 4th year at Missouri. The team played its home games at Mizzou Arena in Columbia, Missouri and was a member of the Big 12 Conference. The Tigers finished the season 23–11, 10–6 in Big 12 play and they lost in the first round of the 2010 Big 12 men's basketball tournament. They received an at–large bid to the 2010 NCAA Division I men's basketball tournament, earning a 10 seed in the East Region. They upset 7 seed Clemson in the first round before falling to 2 seed and AP #6 West Virginia in the second round.

== Roster ==
Name	#	Position	Height	Weight	Year	Home Town
Miguel Paul	3	Guard	6-1	172	SO	Lakeland, Florida
J. T. Tiller	4	Guard	6-3	200	SR	Marietta, Georgia
Michael Dixon, Jr.	10	Guard	6-1	175	FR	Kansas City, Missouri
Zaire Taylor	11	Guard	6-4	189	RS SR	Staten Island, New York
Marcus Denmon	12	Guard	6-3	185	SO	Kansas City, Missouri
Keith Ramsey	15	Forward	6-9	210	SR	Murfreesboro, Tennessee
Laurence Bowers	21	Forward	6-8	205	SO	Memphis, Tennessee
Justin Safford	23	Forward	6-8	230	JR	Bloomington, Illinois
Kim English	24	Guard	6-6	200	SO	Baltimore, Maryland
Jarrett Sutton	25	Guard	6-3	190	JR	Kansas City, Missouri
Steve Moore	32	Center	6-9	264	SO	Kansas City, Missouri
Tyler Stone	33	Forward	6-7	225	FR	Memphis, Tennessee
John Underwood	35	Forward	6-9	208	FR	Phoenix, Arizona

== Schedule ==
Date time, TV	Rank^{#}	Opponent^{#}	Result	Record	Site (attendance) city, state
Exhibition
11/06/2009*; 7:00 pm, MSN		Truman State	W 96–33		Mizzou Arena (8,120); Columbia, MO
11/13/2009*; 7:00 pm, MSN		NW Missouri State	W 83–60		Mizzou Arena (7,839); Columbia, MO
Non-conference regular season
11/17/2009*; 7:00 pm, MSN		Tennessee-Martin	W 83–68	1–0	Mizzou Arena (6,986); Columbia, MO
11/22/2009*; 1:00 pm, MSN		Texas-Pan American; South Padre Island Invitational Opening Rounds	W 100–44	2–0	Mizzou Arena (5,796); Columbia, MO
11/24/2009*; 7:00 pm, MSN		Chattanooga; South Padre Island Invitational Opening Rounds	W 99–56	3–0	Mizzou Arena (6,173); Columbia, MO
11/27/2009*; 7:30 pm, Fox College Sports		vs. Old Dominion; South Padre Island Invitational	W 66–61	4–0	South Padre Island Convention Centre ( NA); South Padre Island, TX
11/28/2009*; 7:00 pm, Fox College Sports		vs. Richmond; South Padre Island Invitational	L 52–59	4–1	South Padre Island Convention Centre ( NA); South Padre Island, TX
12/02/2009*; 8:30 pm, ESPNU		at Vanderbilt	L 83–89	4–2	Memorial Gymnasium (14,256); Nashville, TN
12/5/2009*; 4:00 pm, ESPNU		Oregon; Big 12/Pac-10 Hardwood Series	W 106–69	5–2	Mizzou Arena ( 9,940); Columbia, MO
12/09/2009*; 7:00 pm, MSN		at Oral Roberts	L 59–60	5–3	Mabee Center ( 6,487); Tulsa, OK
12/12/2009*; 7:00 pm, MSN		Fairleigh Dickinson	W 87–36	6–3	Mizzou Arena ( 7,583); Columbia, MO
12/19/2009*; 7:00 pm, MSN		Arkansas-Pine Bluff	W 88–70	7–3	Mizzou Arena (7,425); Columbia, MO
12/23/09*; 8:30 pm, ESPN2		vs. Illinois; Braggin' Rights	W 81–68	8–3	Scottrade Center (20,497); St. Louis, MO
12/27/09*; 2:00 pm, MSN		Austin Peay	W 94–79	9–3	Mizzou Arena (7,129); Columbia, MO
12/30/09*; 7:00 pm, MSN		UMKC	W 91–57	10–3	Mizzou Arena (7,638); Columbia, MO
01/02/10*; 3:00 pm, MSN		Georgia	W 89–61	11–3	Mizzou Arena (13,336); Columbia, MO
01/06/10*; 7:00 pm, MSN		Savannah State	W 74–45	12–3	Mizzou Arena ( 3,394); Columbia, MO
Big 12 Regular Season
01/09/10; 1:00 pm, ESPN 2		Kansas State	W 74–68	13–3 (1–0)	Mizzou Arena ( 13,824); Columbia, MO
01/13/10; 8:00 pm, ESPNU		at Texas Tech	W 94–89 ^{OT}	14–3 (2–0)	United Spirit Arena (9,788); Lubbock, TX
01/16/10; 12:00 pm, ESPN 2		at Oklahoma	L 61–66	14–4 (2–1)	Lloyd Noble Center (12,384); Norman, OK
01/23/10; 5:00 pm, Big 12 Network		Nebraska	W 70–53	15–4 (3–1)	Mizzou Arena (15,061); Columbia, MO
01/25/10; 8:00 pm, ESPN		at No. 2 Kansas; Border Showdown	L 65–84	15–5 (3–2)	Allen Fieldhouse (16,300); Lawrence, KS
01/30/10; 1:00 pm, ESPN2		Oklahoma State	W 95–80	16–5 (4–2)	Mizzou Arena (15,061); Columbia, MO
02/03/10; 8:00 pm, ESPNU		Texas A&M	L 74–77	16–6 (4–3)	Mizzou Arena (11,431); Columbia, MO
02/06/10; 3:00 pm, Big 12 Network		at Colorado	W 84–66	17–6 (5–3)	Coors Events Center (8,248); Boulder, CO
02/10/10; 6:30 pm, MSN		Iowa State	W 65–56	18–6 (6–3)	Mizzou Arena (11,760); Columbia, MO
02/13/10; 12:45 pm, Big 12 Network		at No. 24 Baylor	L 62–64	18–7 (6–4)	Ferrell Center (9,347); Waco, TX
02/17/10; 8:00 pm, ESPN2		No. 15 Texas	W 82–77	19–7 (7–4)	Mizzou Arena (14,389); Columbia, MO
02/20/10; 5:00 pm, Big 12 Network		at Nebraska	W 74–59	20–7 (8–4)	Bob Devaney Sports Center (10,979); Lincoln, NE
02/24/10; 6:30 pm		Colorado	W 92–63	21–7 (9–4)	Mizzou Arena (14,303); Columbia, MO
02/27/10; 7:00 pm, ESPNU		at No. 6 Kansas State	L 53–63	21–8 (9–5)	Bramlage Coliseum (12,528); Manhattan, KS
03/02/10; 7:00 pm, Big 12 Network		at Iowa State	W 69–67 ^{OT}	22–8 (10–5)	Hilton Coliseum (11,282); Ames, IA
03/06/10; 1:00 pm, CBS		No. 2 Kansas; Border Showdown	L 56–77	22–9 (10–6)	Mizzou Arena (15,061); Columbia, MO
Big 12 Tournament
03/10/10; 2:00 pm, Big 12 Network	(5)	vs. (12) Nebraska; First Round	L 60–75	22–10	Sprint Center (18,879); Kansas City, MO
NCAA Tournament
03/19/10*; 1:50 pm, CBS	(10)	vs. (7) Clemson; First Round	W 86–78	23–10	HSBC Arena (18,653); Buffalo, NY
03/21/10*; 1:40 pm, CBS	(10)	vs. (2) No. 6 West Virginia; Second Round	L 59–68	23–11	HSBC Arena (18,934); Buffalo, NY
*Non-conference game. ^{#}Rankings from AP Poll. (#) Tournament seedings in parentheses. All times are in Central Time.
