= 2009–10 Baylor Bears basketball team =

American college basketball season

2009–10 Baylor Bears men's basketball

NCAA tournament, Elite Eight
- Conference: Big 12 Conference

Ranking
- Coaches: No. 10
- AP: No. 19
- Record: 28–8 (11–5 Big 12)
- Head coach: Scott Drew (7th season)
- Assistant coaches: Mark Morefield; Jerome Tang; Paul Mills
- Home arena: Ferrell Center

2009–10 Big 12 men's basketball standings
	Conf.				Overall
Team	W		L	PCT	W		L	PCT
No. 1 Kansas†	15	–	1	.938	33	–	3	.917
No. 7 Kansas State	11	–	5	.688	29	–	8	.784
No. 19 Baylor	11	–	5	.688	28	–	8	.778
No. 23 Texas A&M	11	–	5	.688	24	–	10	.706
Missouri	10	–	6	.625	23	–	11	.676
Texas	9	–	7	.563	24	–	10	.706
Oklahoma State	9	–	7	.563	22	–	11	.667
Colorado	6	–	10	.375	15	–	16	.484
Texas Tech	4	–	12	.250	19	–	16	.543
Iowa State	4	–	12	.250	15	–	17	.469
Oklahoma	4	–	12	.250	13	–	18	.419
Nebraska	2	–	14	.125	15	–	18	.455
† 2010 Big 12 Tournament winner Rankings from AP poll

The 2009–10 Baylor Bears basketball team represented Baylor University in the 2009–10 NCAA Division I men's basketball season. This was head coach Scott Drew's seventh season at Baylor. The Bears compete in the Big 12 Conference and played their home games at the Ferrell Center. They advanced to the semifinals of the 2010 Big 12 men's basketball tournament before losing to Kansas State. They received an at–large bid to the 2010 NCAA Division I men's basketball tournament, earning a #3 seed in the South Region. Their first round win over #14 seed Sam Houston State was the school's first tournament win since 1950. They defeated #11 seed Old Dominion in second round to advance to the Sweet Sixteen for the first time in school history. They extended their record breaking run by defeating #10 seed Saint Mary's to advance to the Elite Eight where they would fall to #1 seed and AP #3 Duke. They finished the season with a record of 28–8, the 28 wins is a school record.

== Pre-season ==
In the Big 12 preseason polls, released October 14, Baylor was selected to finish tenth in the Big 12 coaches poll.

== Roster ==
#	Name	Height	Weight (lbs.)	Position	Class	Hometown	Previous Team(s)
3	Fred Ellis	6'6"	215	F	So.	Sacramento, CA, U.S.	Sacramento HS
4	Quincy Acy	6'7"	225	F	So.	Mesquite, TX, U.S.	Horn HS
12	Nolan Dennis	6'5"	180	G	Fr.	North Richland Hills, TX, U.S.	Richland HS
13	Ekpe Udoh	6'10"	240	F C	Jr.	Edmond, OK, U.S.	Edmond Santa Fe HS; Michigan
14	Dragan Sekelja	7'0"	275	C	Fr.	Zagreb, Croatia	Sportska Gimnazija
20	Givon Crump	6'7"	210	F	Fr.	Washington, DC, U.S.	Brewster Academy
21	Oscar Griffin	6'4"	200	G	Fr.	Philadelphia, PA, U.S.	Life Center Academy
22	A. J. Walton	6'1"	190	G	Fr.	Little Rock, AR, U.S.	Hall HS
24	LaceDarius Dunn	6'4"	205	G	Jr.	Monroe, LA, U.S.	Excelsior Christian School
34	Cory Jefferson	6'9"	200	F	Fr.	Killeen, TX, U.S.	Killeen HS
41	Anthony Jones	6'10"	195	F	So.	Houston, TX, U.S.	Yates HS
45	Tweety Carter	5'11"	185	G	Sr.	Reserve, LA, U.S.	Reserve Christian School
50	Josh Lomers	7'0"	280	C	Sr.	Boerne, TX, U.S.	Boerne HS

== Schedule and results ==
- All times are Central

Date time, TV	Rank^{#}	Opponent^{#}	Result	Record	Site (attendance) city, state
Exhibition
11/5/2009*; 7:00pm		Central Oklahoma	W 86–71		Ferrell Center (5,239); Waco, TX
Regular Season
11/13/2009*; 7:00pm		Norfolk State	W 86–58	1–0	Ferrell Center (6,361); Waco, TX
11/15/2009*; 1:30pm		Hartford	W 71–69	2–0	Ferrell Center (5,026); Waco, TX
11/16/2009*; 7:00pm		Southern	W 61–45	3–0	Ferrell Center (5,093); Waco, TX
11/22/2009*; 4:30pm		Hardin-Simmons	W 106–45	4–0	Ferrell Center (5,351); Waco, TX
11/26/2009*; 5:30pm, ESPN2		vs. Alabama; Old Spice Classic	L 76–79	4–1	The Milk House (2,149); Lake Buena Vista, FL
11/27/2009*; 6:30pm, ESPNU		vs. Iona; Old Spice Classic	W 72–62	5–1	The Milk House (1,915); Lake Buena Vista, FL
11/29/2009*; 11:30am, ESPNU		vs. Xavier; Old Spice Classic	W 69–64	6–1	The Milk House (1,846); Lake Buena Vista, FL
12/3/2009*; 9:30pm, FSN		at Arizona State; Big 12/Pac-10 Hardwood Series	W 64–61	7–1	Wells Fargo Arena (7,948); Tempe, AZ
12/15/2009*; 7:00pm		Jackson State	W 90–60	8–1	Ferrell Center (5,191); Waco, TX
12/20/2009*; 2:00pm, FS SW		Texas–Arlington	W 94–63	9–1	Ferrell Center (5,361); Waco, TX
12/30/2009*; 8:00pm, ESPN2		vs. Arkansas	W 70–47	10–1	Verizon Arena (11,162); North Little Rock, AR
1/2/2010*; 11:00am, FS Carolinas		at South Carolina	W 85–74	11–1	Colonial Life Arena (11,312); Columbia, SC
1/6/2010*; 7:00pm		Morgan State	W 79–63	12–1	Ferrell Center (5,187); Waco, TX
1/9/2010; 5:00pm, Big 12 Network		Oklahoma	W 91–60	13–1 (1–0)	Ferrell Center (8,757); Waco, TX
1/12/2010; 8:00pm, FS RM	No. 22	at Colorado	L 71–78	13–2 (1–1)	Coors Events Center (6,957); Boulder, CO
1/16/2010; 3:00pm, Big 12 Network	No. 22	Oklahoma State	W 83–70	14–2 (2–1)	Ferrell Center (9,223); Waco, TX
1/20/2010; 8:00pm, ESPN2	No. 25	at No. 3 Kansas	L 75–81	14–3 (2–2)	Allen Fieldhouse (16,300); Lawrence, KS
1/23/2010*; 3:00pm, ESPNU	No. 25	Massachusetts	W 71–45	15–3 (2–2)	Ferrell Center (7,779); Waco, TX
1/26/2010; 7:00pm, FS SW	No. 24	No. 11 Kansas State	L 74–76	15–4 (2–3)	Ferrell Center (8,833); Waco, TX
1/30/2010; 3:00pm, Big 12 Network	No. 24	at No. 6 Texas	W 80–77	16–4 (3–3)	Frank Erwin Center (16,734); Austin, TX
2/3/2010; 6:30pm, FS SW	No. 20	Iowa State	W 84–63	17–4 (4–3)	Ferrell Center (7,749); Waco, TX
2/6/2010; 3:00pm, Big 12 Network	No. 20	at Texas A&M	L 71–78	17–5 (4–4)	Reed Arena (13,021); College Station, TX
2/10/2010; 8:00pm, ESPN2	No. 24	at Nebraska	W 55–53	18–5 (5–4)	Bob Devaney Sports Center (9,787); Lincoln, NE
2/13/2010; 12:45pm, Big 12 Network	No. 24	Missouri	W 64–62	19–5 (6–4)	Ferrell Center (9,347); Waco, TX
2/16/2010; 7:00pm, FS SW	No. 22	Texas Tech	W 88–70	20–5 (7–4)	Ferrell Center (9,391); Waco, TX
2/20/2010; 12:30pm, Big 12 Network	No. 22	at Oklahoma State	L 75–82	20–6 (7–5)	Gallagher-Iba Arena (11,722); Stillwater, OK
2/24/2010; 8:00pm, ESPNU	No. 24	No. 22 Texas A&M	W 70–66	21–6 (8–5)	Ferrell Center (10,094); Waco, TX
2/27/2010; 12:45pm, Big 12 Network	No. 24	at Oklahoma	W 70–63	22–6 (9–5)	Lloyd Noble Center (7,894); Norman, OK
3/2/2010; 7:00pm, FSN SW	No. 21	at Texas Tech	W 86–68	23–6 (10–5)	United Spirit Arena (9,232); Lubbock, TX
3/6/2010; 3:00pm, ESPN	No. 21	Texas	W 92–77	24–6 (11–5)	Ferrell Center (10,562); Waco, TX
2010 Big 12 men's basketball tournament
3/11/2010; 8:35pm, ESPN2	(3) No. 21	vs. (6) Texas; Quarterfinals	W 86–67	25–6	Sprint Center (18,879); Kansas City, MO
3/12/2010; 8:38 pm, ESPN2	(3) No. 21	vs. (2) No. 9 Kansas State; Semifinals	L 75–82	25–7	Sprint Center (18,879); Kansas City, MO
2010 NCAA Division I men's basketball tournament
3/18/2010*; 1:45 pm, CBS	(3 S) No. 19	vs. (14 S) Sam Houston State; First Round	W 68–59	26–7	New Orleans Arena (10,484); New Orleans, LA
3/20/2010*; 4:45 pm, CBS	(3 S) No. 19	vs. (11 S) Old Dominion; Second Round	W 76–68	27–7	New Orleans Arena (11,966); New Orleans, LA
3/26/2010*; 6:27 pm, CBS	(3 S) No. 19	vs. (10 S) Saint Mary's; Sweet Sixteen	W 72–49	28–7	Reliant Stadium (45,505); Houston, TX
3/28/2010*; 4:05pm, CBS	(3 S) No. 19	vs. (1 S) No. 3 Duke; Elite Eight	L 71–78	28–8	Reliant Stadium (47,492); Houston, TX
*Non-conference game. ^{#}Rankings from AP Poll. (#) Tournament seedings in parentheses.

== All Conference ==
Lacedarius Dunn was named to the All-Big 12 2nd team. Ekpe Udoh and Tweety Carter were named to the All-Big 12 3rd team after the season.

== Rankings ==
Ranking movements Legend: ██ Increase in ranking ██ Decrease in ranking — = Not ranked
	Week																			
Poll	Pre	1	2	3	4	5	6	7	8	9	10	11	12	13	14	15	16	17	18	Final
AP	—	—	—	—	—	—	—	—	—	22	25	24	20	24	22	24	21	21	19	Not released
Coaches	—	—	—	—	—	—	—	—	—	24	—	—	24	—	22	—	22	20	21	10

*AP does not release post-NCAA Tournament rankings
^Coaches did not release a Week 2 poll.
