= 2009–10 Texas A&M Aggies men's basketball team =

American college basketball season

2009–10 Texas A&M Aggies men's basketball

76 Classic, Third place

NCAA tournament, Round of 32
- Conference: Big 12 Conference

Ranking
- Coaches: No. 25
- AP: No. 23
- Record: 24–10 (11–5 Big 12)
- Head coach: Mark Turgeon
- Assistant coaches: Scott Spinelli; Pooh Williamson; Bill Walker
- Home arena: Reed Arena

2009–10 Big 12 men's basketball standings
	Conf.				Overall
Team	W		L	PCT	W		L	PCT
No. 1 Kansas†	15	–	1	.938	33	–	3	.917
No. 7 Kansas State	11	–	5	.688	29	–	8	.784
No. 19 Baylor	11	–	5	.688	28	–	8	.778
No. 23 Texas A&M	11	–	5	.688	24	–	10	.706
Missouri	10	–	6	.625	23	–	11	.676
Texas	9	–	7	.563	24	–	10	.706
Oklahoma State	9	–	7	.563	22	–	11	.667
Colorado	6	–	10	.375	15	–	16	.484
Texas Tech	4	–	12	.250	19	–	16	.543
Iowa State	4	–	12	.250	15	–	17	.469
Oklahoma	4	–	12	.250	13	–	18	.419
Nebraska	2	–	14	.125	15	–	18	.455
† 2010 Big 12 Tournament winner Rankings from AP poll

The 2009–10 Texas A&M Aggies men's basketball team represented Texas A&M University in the 2009-10 NCAA Division I men's basketball season. The team was led by third-year head coach Mark Turgeon, who coached the team to a 24–10 record and an NCAA tournament appearance in the previous season. The Aggies play their home games in Reed Arena. The team was picked to finish fifth in the Big 12 in the preseason coaches' poll but finished tied for second. With their 22–8 regular-season finish and 11–5 mark in conference play, the Aggies participated in the 2010 Big 12 men's basketball tournament and defeated Nebraska before losing to No. 1 Kansas in the semifinals. They received an at–large bid to the 2010 NCAA Division I men's basketball tournament and earned a 5 seed in the South Region. They defeated 12 seed Utah State in the first round before falling to 4 seed Purdue in overtime in the second round to finish their season at 24–10. In the final Coaches' Poll, the Aggies were ranked No. 25.

== Pre-season ==
Nearly all of the contributors from the previous year's NCAA Tournament second-round team returned for the Aggies, including seniors Donald Sloan, Derrick Roland and Bryan Davis, along with juniors B.J. Holmes and Nathan Walkup and sophomores David Loubeau and Dash Harris. Despite that, the Aggies began the year unranked. A&M faced a much tougher non-conference schedule than they had played in recent years, featuring a trip to Los Angeles for the 76 Classic. Among the other participants in the tournament were nationally ranked West Virginia, Butler, Minnesota and Clemson. Their other marquee matchup before the beginning of conference play was scheduled against the preseason-No. 14 Washington Huskies. Though the Aggies were not ranked in any major poll, they received votes in both the AP and Coaches' polls.

=== Departures ===
The main factors contributing to A&M's being unranked in the preseason were the departures of senior guard Josh Carter—the winningest player in Aggie basketball history—and junior post player Chinemelu Elonu, two of the team's starters the previous year. Carter graduated and signed a contract to play in Germany, while Elonu was drafted in the second round of the NBA draft. The loss of Elonu, who along with Bryan Davis constituted much of the Aggies' inside game, was tabbed as being especially detrimental to the team's hopes for success as the 2009–10 season began.

=== Recruiting ===
In 2008 the Aggies received commitments from four-star rated Naji Hibbert and three-star prospects Khris Middleton, Kourtney Roberson and Ray Turner. They later added Jeremy Adams to a class that narrowly missed being ranked in the top 25 classes nationally by ESPN. Roberson was later declared ineligible and, after waiting one year, will join the nationally ranked A&M class of 2010. Turner was ineligible for the fall semester and joined the team in January, bringing an immediate impact. While Hibbert, who was the prize recruit of the class, contributed in many ways as a freshman, it was Middleton, called the best-shooting forward in the high school class of 2009 by many, who later became a starter and threw his name into the ring as a potential future star for the Aggies.

==== Class of 2009 ====
College recruiting information
Name	Hometown	School	Height	Weight	Commit date
Naji Hibbert; SG	Baltimore, Maryland	DeMatha Catholic H.S.	6 ft 6 in (1.98 m)	200 lb (91 kg)	May 5, 2008
Naji Hibbert; SG	Recruit ratings: Scout: Rivals: (92)				
Khris Middleton; SF	Charleston, South Carolina	Porter-Gaud School	6 ft 7 in (2.01 m)	215 lb (98 kg)	May 30, 2008
Khris Middleton; SF	Recruit ratings: Scout: Rivals: (91)				
Jeremy Adams; SG	Madison, Mississippi	Madison Central H.S. (MS)	6 ft 5 in (1.96 m)	195 lb (88 kg)	Feb 20, 2009
Jeremy Adams; SG	Recruit ratings: Scout: Rivals: (90)				
Ray Turner; PF	Houston, Texas	Jesse H. Jones High	6 ft 8 in (2.03 m)	220 lb (100 kg)	Nov 14, 2008
Ray Turner; PF	Recruit ratings: Scout: Rivals: (84)				
Overall Recruiting Rankings: Scout – NR Rivals – NR ESPN – 27

== Roster ==
2009–10 Texas A&M Aggies men's basketball team
Players
Coaches

Pos.	#	Name	Height	Weight	Year	Hometown
F	0	Bryan Davis	6 ft 9 in (2.06 m)	250 lb (113 kg)	Sr	Dallas, Texas
G	2	Derrek Lewis	6 ft 5 in (1.96 m)	195 lb (88 kg)	Jr	Tulsa, Oklahoma
G	3	Derrick Roland (injured)	6 ft 4 in (1.93 m)	190 lb (86 kg)	Sr	Dallas, Texas
G	5	Dash Harris	6 ft 1 in (1.85 m)	175 lb (79 kg)	So	Los Angeles, California
F	10	David Loubeau	6 ft 8 in (2.03 m)	230 lb (104 kg)	So	Miami, Florida
G	11	B.J. Holmes	6 ft 0 in (1.83 m)	175 lb (79 kg)	Jr	Houston, Texas
C	12	James Blasczyk	7 ft 0 in (2.13 m)	230 lb (104 kg)	RS Fr	Houston, Texas
G	14	Andrew Darko	6 ft 1 in (1.85 m)	175 lb (79 kg)	Jr	Conroe, Texas
G	15	Donald Sloan	6 ft 3 in (1.91 m)	205 lb (93 kg)	Sr	Dallas, Texas
F	21	Ray Turner	6 ft 8 in (2.03 m)	220 lb (100 kg)	Fr	Houston, Texas
F	22	Khris Middleton	6 ft 7 in (2.01 m)	215 lb (98 kg)	Fr	Charleston, South Carolina
G	23	Naji Hibbert	6 ft 6 in (1.98 m)	200 lb (91 kg)	Fr	Baltimore, Maryland
G	24	Shawn Schepel	6 ft 3 in (1.91 m)	205 lb (93 kg)	Jr	Phoenix, Arizona
G	25	Jeremy Adams (redshirt)	6 ft 5 in (1.96 m)	195 lb (88 kg)	Fr	Madison, Mississippi
G	31	Chris Chapman	5 ft 11 in (1.8 m)	175 lb (79 kg)	Sr	Houston, Texas
F	33	Marshall Carrell	6 ft 8 in (2.03 m)	230 lb (104 kg)	Jr	Paris, Texas
F	45	Nathan Walkup	6 ft 7 in (2.01 m)	210 lb (95 kg)	Jr	Houston, Texas

Head coach

- Mark Turgeon (Kansas)

Assistant coach(es)

- Scott Spinelli (Boston University)
- Pooh Williamson (Tulsa)
- Bill Walker (UAB)

Legend

- (C) Team captain
- (S) Suspended
- (I) Ineligible
- (W) Walk-on
- Injured
- Current redshirt

Roster
Last update: 2010-02-20

== Schedule ==
Date time, TV	Rank^{#}	Opponent^{#}	Result	Record	Site (attendance) city, state
Exhibition
11/05/09*; 7:00 p.m.		Texas A&M–Commerce	W 89–65		Reed Arena (7,350); College Station, TX
Regular season
11/13/09*; 7:05 p.m.		Angelo State	W 88–69	1–0	Reed Arena (7,843); College Station, TX
11/16/09*; 7:00 p.m.		at SMU	W 80–68	2–0	Moody Coliseum (6,729); Dallas, TX
11/20/09*; 7:00 p.m.		Samford	W 68–49	3–0	Reed Arena (8,329); College Station, TX
11/26/09*; 3:30 p.m., ESPN2		No. 19 Clemson; 76 Classic	W 69–60	4–0	Anaheim Arena (2,117); Anaheim, CA
11/27/09*; 1:30 p.m., ESPN		No. 8 West Virginia; 76 Classic	L 66–73	4–1	Anaheim Arena (NA); Anaheim, CA
11/29/09*; 4:00 p.m., ESPN2		No. 22 Minnesota; 76 Classic	W 66–65	5–1	Anaheim Arena (2,247); Anaheim, CA
12/2/09*; 8:00 p.m.	No. 19	Prairie View A&M	W 84–59	6–1	Reed Arena (9,151); College Station, TX
12/4/09*; 7:00 p.m., FSN SW	No. 19	Akron	W 74–62	7–1	Reed Arena (7,668); College Station, TX
12/7/09*; 7:00 p.m., FSN SW	No. 16	North Texas	W 75–65	8–1	Reed Arena (6,366); College Station, TX
12/12/09*; 5:00 p.m., FSN SW	No. 16	vs. New Mexico	L 84–81	8–2	Toyota Center (7,757); Houston, TX
12/19/09*; 8:00 p.m.	No. 23	The Citadel	W 71–50	9–2	Reed Arena (7,165); College Station, TX
12/22/09*; 10:00 p.m., FSN	No. 19	No. 22 @ Washington; Big 12/Pac-10 Hardwood Series	L 73–64	9–3	Bank of America Arena (10,000); Seattle, WA
1/2/10*; 12:00 p.m.		Northwestern State	W 89–63	10–3	Reed Arena (7,213); College Station, TX
1/5/10*; 7:00 p.m., FSN SW		North Dakota	W 82–41	11–3	Reed Arena (7,903); College Station, TX
1/9/10; 3:00 p.m., Big 12 Network		Nebraska	W 64–53	12–3 (1–0)	Reed Arena (9,628); College Station, TX
1/12/10; 6:00 p.m., ESPN2		No. 13 @ Kansas State	L 88–65	12–4 (1–1)	Bramlage Coliseum (12,528); Manhattan, KS
1/16/10; 5:00 p.m., ESPNU		No. 1 @ Texas; State Farm Lone Star Showdown	L 72–67 ^{OT}	12–5 (1–2)	Frank Erwin Center (16,734); Austin, TX
1/19/10; 7:00 p.m., Big 12 Network		Oklahoma	W 65–62	13–5 (2–2)	Reed Arena (11,109); College Station, TX
1/23/10; 12:30 p.m., Big 12 Network		Colorado	W 67–63	14–5 (3–2)	Reed Arena (10,316); College Station, TX
1/27/10; 6:30 p.m., ESPN2		@ Oklahoma State	L 76–69	14–6 (3–3)	Gallagher-Iba Arena (11,328); Stillwater, OK
1/30/10; 8:00 p.m., FSN SW		Texas Tech	W 85–70	15–6 (4–3)	Reed Arena (13,648); College Station, TX
2/3/10; 8:00 p.m., ESPNU		@ Missouri	W 77–74	16–6 (5–3)	Mizzou Arena (11,431); Columbia, MO
2/6/10; 3:00 p.m., Big 12 Network		No. 20 Baylor; Battle of the Brazos	W 78–71	17–6 (6–3)	Reed Arena (13,021); College Station, TX
2/13/10; 4:00 p.m., ESPN2		@ Texas Tech	W 67–65	18–6 (7–3)	United Spirit Arena (11,453); Lubbock, TX
2/15/10; 8:00 p.m., ESPN	No. 24	No. 1 Kansas	L 59–54	18–7 (7–4)	Reed Arena (13,657); College Station, TX
2/20/10; 3:00 p.m., Big 12 Network	No. 24	@ Iowa State	W 60–56	19–7 (8–4)	Hilton Coliseum (13,031); Ames, IA
2/24/10; 8:00 p.m., ESPNU	No. 22	No. 24 @ Baylor	L 70–66	19–8 (8–5)	Ferrell Center (10,094); Waco, TX
2/27/10; 1:00 p.m., ESPN	No. 22	No. 21 Texas; State Farm Lone Star Showdown	W 74–58	20–8 (9–5)	Reed Arena (13,717); College Station, TX
3/3/10; 8:00 p.m., ESPN2	No. 23	Oklahoma State	W 76–61	21–8 (10–5)	Reed Arena (11,488); College Station, TX
3/6/10; 11:00 a.m., ESPN	No. 23	@ Oklahoma	W 69–54	22–8 (11–5)	Lloyd Noble Center (11,074); Norman, OK
2010 Big 12 men's basketball tournament
3/11/2010; 2:00 p.m., Big 12 Network	No. 23	vs. Nebraska; Quarterfinals	W 70–64	23–8	Sprint Center (18,879); Kansas City, MO
3/12/2010; 6:00 p.m., Big 12 Network	No. 23	vs. No. 1 Kansas; Semifinals	L 79–66	23–9	Sprint Center (18,879); Kansas City, MO
2010 NCAA Division I men's basketball tournament
3/19/2010; 4:00 p.m., CBS	No. 23 (5)	vs. (12) Utah State; First Round	W 69–53	24–9	Spokane Arena (10,899); Spokane, WA
3/21/2010; 4:00 p.m., CBS	No. 23 (5)	vs. No. 10 (4) Purdue; Second Round	L 63–61 ^{OT}	24–10	Spokane Arena (11,036); Spokane, WA
*Non-conference game. ^{#}Rankings from AP Poll. (#) Tournament seedings in parentheses. All times are in Central Standard Time.

== Derrick Roland ==
On December 22, 2009, senior guard Derrick Roland broke the tibia and fibula in his right leg early in the second half of the Aggies' game against Washington. After going up for a rebound, he came down awkwardly, his leg emitting a loud crack that was heard throughout the arena. The leg bent outwards at a ninety-degree angle in the middle of his shin. Many of the Aggies began crying on the court at the sight, including Roland's childhood friend, senior guard Donald Sloan, who had to be helped off of the court. Pondexter called it "One of the nastiest things I've ever seen." Turgeon said, "Derrick was the heart and soul of this team. Everyone is devastated. Our guys had their eyes swollen in the last five minutes of the game. They were crying during the game. They never came out of it." The Aggies, who were shaken, stumbled to a 73-64 defeat. After the loss, the previously No. 19 Aggies (in the AP poll) dropped out of the rankings and did not re-enter until February 15, 2010. Roland was treated in a Seattle-area hospital before returning to Texas. At the time of his injury, he was averaging 11.1 points per game, second on the team, and had been named to the All-Big 12 Defensive Team the year before. Roland's injury significantly altered the course and prospects of the Aggies' season.

In A&M's conference play-opening win against Nebraska, Roland returned to the team bench on crutches and watched his teammates play in person for the first time since his injury. Despite missing one of their team captains, their best defender and a viable scoring option—or perhaps using it as motivation—the Aggies continued on to a 22-8 regular-season record and an 11-5 conference record, tied for second in the Big 12. The team became a mainstay in the top 15 of the RPI and ranked in both the AP and Coaches' polls for the entirety of the second half of the season. Roland's quick progression in his recovery led to rumors that he may have been able to return to the team, able to play, in time for the Big 12 tournament or the NCAA tournament, but Texas A&M was reluctant to feed speculation regarding the possibilities and no situation in which he could enter a game ever materialized.

On March 3, 2010, Roland was honored along with fellow seniors Donald Sloan and Bryan Davis at the Aggies' Senior Night before and after Texas A&M's win against Oklahoma State in their last home game of the season. The Aggies' season ended in the second round of the 2010 NCAA Tournament with a loss to fourth-seeded Purdue, and it was announced that coach Mark Turgeon would help Roland pursue a medical redshirt in order to return to the team for the 2010-11 season.

"He's always thought about it, but the thing about it is there is no guarantee," Turgeon said. "Let's just say we're going to try to get him a redshirt year. I'm not going to sit here and fight it in the media. It's something we are going to try. He wants to try but we are fighting an uphill battle on this one."

== Rankings ==
Legend: ██ Increase in ranking. ██ Decrease in ranking. ██ Final ranking. *No poll released.
Poll	Pre	Wk 1	Wk 2	Wk 3	Wk 4	Wk 5	Wk 6	Wk 7	Wk 8	Wk 9	Wk 10	Wk 11	Wk 12	Wk 13	Wk 14	Wk 15	Wk 16	Wk 17	Wk 18	Final
AP				19	16	23	19								24	22	23	23	23	*
Coaches				22	18										23	23	24	24	23	25

Note: Team received votes in every poll for which they were unranked, with the exception of Week 12.
