= 2009 76 Classic =

- Season: 2009–10
- Teams: 8
- Finals site: Anaheim Convention Center; Anaheim, California
- Champions: West Virginia
- MVP: DaSean Butler, West Virginia

The 2009 76 Classic was a 3-day, 8-team, 12-game men's National Collegiate Athletic Association (NCAA) Division I exempt basketball event held on November 26, 27, & 29, 2009 during the 2009-10 NCAA Division I men's basketball season. The tournament was sponsored by ConocoPhillips-owned brand 76. All games were played at the Anaheim Convention Center in Anaheim, California. The 76 Classic was an ESPN Regional TV owned and operated event, hosted by ESPN and the Big West Conference. All games were televised on the ESPN family of networks.

Butler, with 6'9" Gordon Hayward, was rated No. 9 by ESPN The Magazine in its pre-season rankings, followed by No. 11 West Virginia, No. 23 Minnesota, No. 27 Texas A&M, and No. 30 UCLA. West Virginia won the tournament by defeating Long Beach State, Texas A&M, and upstart Portland in the finals to capture the 76 Classic title in 2009.

== Bracket ==
* – Denotes overtime period

5th Place Game; November 29
19	Clemson	70
10	Butler	69
7th Place Game; November 29
Long Beach State	79
UCLA	68

Consolation 2nd Round; November 27
19	Clemson	87
Long Beach State	79
10	Butler	69
UCLA	67

First Round; November 26
8	West Virginia	85
Long Beach State	62
Texas A&M	69
19	Clemson	60
16	Minnesota	82
10	Butler	73
Portland	74
UCLA	47

Semifinals; November 27
8	West Virginia	73
Texas A&M	66
16	Minnesota	56
Portland	61

Championship; November 29
8	West Virginia	84
Portland	66
3rd Place Game; November 29
Texas A&M	66
16	Minnesota	65

== Awards and honors ==
Tournament MVP

- DaSean Butler, West Virginia

All-Tournament Team

- DaSean Butler, West Virginia
- T.J. Campbell, Portland
- T.J. Robinson, Long Beach State
- Gordon Hayward, Butler

== See also ==
- 76 Classic
