= 2009–10 Iowa State Cyclones men's basketball team =

American college basketball season

2009–10 Iowa State Cyclones men's basketball
- Conference: Big 12 Conference
- Record: 15-17 (4-12 Big 12)
- Head coach: Greg McDermott (4th season)
- Assistant coaches: T. J. Otzelberger (4th season); Jeff Rutter; Daniyal Robinson
- Home arena: Hilton Coliseum

2009–10 Big 12 men's basketball standings
	Conf.				Overall
Team	W		L	PCT	W		L	PCT
No. 1 Kansas†	15	–	1	.938	33	–	3	.917
No. 7 Kansas State	11	–	5	.688	29	–	8	.784
No. 19 Baylor	11	–	5	.688	28	–	8	.778
No. 23 Texas A&M	11	–	5	.688	24	–	10	.706
Missouri	10	–	6	.625	23	–	11	.676
Texas	9	–	7	.563	24	–	10	.706
Oklahoma State	9	–	7	.563	22	–	11	.667
Colorado	6	–	10	.375	15	–	16	.484
Texas Tech	4	–	12	.250	19	–	16	.543
Iowa State	4	–	12	.250	15	–	17	.469
Oklahoma	4	–	12	.250	13	–	18	.419
Nebraska	2	–	14	.125	15	–	18	.455
† 2010 Big 12 Tournament winner Rankings from AP poll

The 2009–10 Iowa State Cyclones men's basketball team represented Iowa State University during the 2009–10 NCAA Division I men's basketball season. The Cyclones were coached by Greg McDermott, who was in his 4th season. They played their home games at Hilton Coliseum in Ames, Iowa and competed in the Big 12 Conference.

== Previous season ==
The Cyclones finished 15–17, and 4–12 in Big 12 play to finish 10th in the regular season conference standings. They lost to Oklahomas State in the first round of the Big 12 tournament.

=== Offseason departures ===
Offseason departures
Name	Position	Reason
Wes Eikmeier	Guard	Transferred to Colorado State
Cameron Lee	Guard	Transferred to University of Mary
Clinton Mann	Forward	Transferred to Davidson
Sean Haluska	Guard	Graduated
Alex Thompson	Forward	Graduated
Brian Peterson	Guard	Graduated

== Recruiting ==
College recruiting information
Name	Hometown	School	Height	Weight	Commit date
Chris Colvin; PG #19	Chicago	Whitney M. Young Magnet	6 ft 3 in (1.91 m)	185 lb (84 kg)	Nov 19, 2008
Chris Colvin; PG #19	Recruit ratings: Scout: Rivals: 247Sports: (91)				
Antwon Oliver; SG	Racine, Wisconsin	William Horlick High	6 ft 5 in (1.96 m)	175 lb (79 kg)	Apr 30, 2009
Antwon Oliver; SG	Recruit ratings: Scout: Rivals: 247Sports: (86)				
LaRon Dendy; PF	Greer, South Carolina	Indian Hills CC	6 ft 10 in (2.08 m)	205 lb (93 kg)	Mar 24, 2009
LaRon Dendy; PF	Recruit ratings: Scout: Rivals: 247Sports: (NR)				
Marquis Gilstrap; SF	Covington, GA	Gulf Coast CC	6 ft 6 in (1.98 m)	210 lb (95 kg)	Aug 6, 2008
Marquis Gilstrap; SF	Recruit ratings: Scout: Rivals: 247Sports: (NR)				
Overall recruit ranking: 247Sports: 34
Note: In many cases, Scout, Rivals, 247Sports, On3, and ESPN may conflict in their listings of height and weight.; In these cases, the average was taken. ESPN grades are on a 100-point scale.; Sources: "Iowa State 2009 Basketball Commitments". Rivals.; "2009 Iowa State Basketball Commits". Scout.; "ESPN". ESPN.; "Scout.com Team Recruiting Rankings". Scout.; "2009 Team Ranking". Rivals.

== Roster ==
2008–09 Iowa State Cyclones men's basketball team
Players
Coaches

Pos.	#	Name	Height	Weight	Year	Previous school	Hometown
G	1	Dominique Buckley	6 ft 2 in (1.88 m)	205 lb (93 kg)	So	Romulus High	Detroit
G	2	Chris Colvin	6 ft 3 in (1.91 m)	195 lb (88 kg)	Fr	Whitney M. Young Magnet	Chicago
F	3	Marquis Gilstrap	6 ft 7 in (2.01 m)	215 lb (98 kg)	Sr	Gulf Coast CC	Covington, GA
G	4	Charles Boozer	6 ft 3 in (1.91 m)	195 lb (88 kg)	Jr	Stoneridge Prep	Raleigh, North Carolina
G	5	Lucca Staiger	6 ft 5 in (1.96 m)	220 lb (100 kg)	Jr	Decatur Christian	Blaustein, GER
G	10	Diante Garrett	6 ft 4 in (1.93 m)	180 lb (82 kg)	Jr	Vincent High	Milwaukee, Wisconsin
G	11	Scott Christopherson	6 ft 3 in (1.91 m)	205 lb (93 kg)	RS So	Marquette	La Crosse, Wisconsin
F	12	Alex Dorr (W)	6 ft 7 in (2.01 m)	210 lb (95 kg)	Fr	Norwalk	Norwalk, Iowa
G	15	Antwon Oliver	6 ft 6 in (1.98 m)	175 lb (79 kg)	Fr	William Horlick High	Racine, Wisconsin
F	21	Craig Brackins	6 ft 10 in (2.08 m)	230 lb (104 kg)	Jr	Brewster Academy	Palmdale, California
F	22	LaRon Dendy	6 ft 9 in (2.06 m)	230 lb (104 kg)	Jr	Indian Hills CC	Greer, South Carolina
F	23	Jamie Vanderbeken	6 ft 11 in (2.11 m)	245 lb (111 kg)	Sr	Tyler JC	Belleville, ON
F	34	L.A. Pomlee	6 ft 8 in (2.03 m)	235 lb (107 kg)	So	Davenport Central	Davenport, Iowa
C	41	Justin Hamilton	6 ft 11 in (2.11 m)	255 lb (116 kg)	So	Lone Peak	Alpine, Utah

Head coach

- Greg McDermott (Northern Iowa)

Assistant coach(es)

- T. J. Otzelberger (UW–Whitewater)
- Jeff Rutter (Winona State)
- Daniyal Robinson (Little Rock)

Legend

- (C) Team captain
- (S) Suspended
- (I) Ineligible
- (W) Walk-on
- Injured
- Current redshirt

== Schedule and results ==
Date time, TV	Rank^{#}	Opponent^{#}	Result	Record	Site (attendance) city, state
Exhibition
November 2, 2009; 7:00 pm, CloneZone		Black Hills State	W 86-47		Ames, Iowa (12,720); Hilton Coliseum
November 6, 2009; 7:00 pm, CloneZone		UNC-Pembroke	W 106-52		Ames, Iowa (13,293); Hilton Coliseum
Regular season
November 13, 2009*; 7:00 pm, ESPN Full Court		Idaho State	W 88-68	1-0	Ames, Iowa (13,727); Hilton Coliseum
November 15, 2009*; 6:00 pm, CloneZone		Chicago State	W 72-50	2-0	Ames, Iowa (13,260); Hilton Coliseum
November 17, 2009*; 7:00 pm, Mediacom		at Drake	W 90-70	3-0	Knapp Center (6,257); Des Moines, Iowa
November 22, 2009*; 1:00 pm, CloneZone		Mississippi Valley State; Chicago Invitational	W 96-55	4-0	Ames, Iowa (11,077); Hilton Coliseum
November 24, 2009*; 7:00 pm, CloneZone		Tennessee State; Chicago Invitational	W 84-53	5-0	Ames, Iowa (11,352); Hilton Coliseum
November 27, 2009*; 5:00 pm		vs. St. Louis; Chicago Invitational	W 65-54	6-0	UIC Pavilion (3,308); Chicago
November 28, 2009*; 7:00 pm, Big Ten Network		vs. Northwestern; Chicago Invitational	L 65-67	6-1	UIC Pavilion (3,308); Chicago
December 2, 2009*; 7:00 pm, ESPN Full Court		Northern Iowa	L 60-63	6-2	Ames, Iowa (14,376); Hilton Coliseum
December 5, 2009*; 10:00 pm, ESPNU		at California; Big 12/Pac-10 Hardwood Series	L 63-82	6-3	Haas Pavilion (9,845); Berkeley, California
December 11, 2009*; 7:00 pm, ESPN Full Court		Iowa; Hyvee Cy-Hawk Series	W 81-71	7-3	Ames, Iowa (13,203); Hilton Coliseum
December 20, 2009*; 1:00 pm, ESPN Full Court		Bradley	W 87-68	8-3	Ames, Iowa (12,293); Hilton Coliseum
December 22, 2009*; 7:00 pm, ESPN Full Court		North Dakota	W 83-52	9-3	Ames, Iowa (11,549); Hilton Coliseum
January 3, 2010*; 1:00 pm, ESPN Full Court		Houston	W 82-75	10-3	Ames, Iowa (13,288); Hilton Coliseum
January 6, 2010*; 9:00 pm, ESPN2		vs. No. 5 Duke	L 65-86	10-4	United Center (10,067); Chicago
January 9, 2010*; 2:00 pm, ESPNU		North Dakota State	W 73-71	11-4	Ames, Iowa (12,937); Hilton Coliseum
January 13, 2010; 7:00 pm, ESPN Full Court		No. 1 Texas	L 83-90	11-5 (0-1)	Ames, Iowa (12,066); Hilton Coliseum
January 16, 2010; 7:00 pm, Big 12 Network		at Nebraska	W 56-53	12-5 (1-1)	Bob Devaney Center (11,367); Lincoln, Nebraska
January 20, 2010; 6:30 pm, ESPN Full Court		at Texas Tech	L 71-78	12-6 (1-2)	United Supermarkets Arena (8,410); Lubbock, Texas
January 23, 2010; 1:00 pm, ESPN		No. 3 Kansas	L 61-84	12-7 (1-3)	Ames, Iowa (14,356); Hilton Coliseum
January 27, 2010; 8:00 pm, ESPN Full Court		at Oklahoma	L 84-89	12-8 (1-4)	Lloyd Noble Center (9,468); Norman, Oklahoma
January 30, 2010; 8:00 pm, ESPN Full Court		Colorado	W 64-63	13-8 (2-4)	Ames, Iowa (11,877); Hilton Coliseum
February 3, 2010; 6:30 pm, Fox Sports Southwest		at Baylor	L 63-84	13-9 (2-5)	Ferrell Center (7,749); Waco, Texas
February 6, 2010; 1:00 pm, ESPN2		No. 10 Kansas State	L 75-79	13-10 (2-6)	Ames, Iowa (12,649); Hilton Coliseum
February 10, 2010; 6:30, ESPN Full Court		at Missouri	L 56-65	13-11 (2-7)	Mizzou Arena (11,760); Columbia, Missouri
February 13, 2010; 7:00 pm, ESPNU		at No. 1 Kansas	L 59-73	13-12 (2-8)	Allen Fieldhouse (16,300); Lawrence, Kansas
February 17, 2010; 7:00 pm, ESPN Full Court		Oklahoma State	L 64-69	13-13 (2-9)	Ames, Iowa (11,360); Hilton Coliseum
February 20, 2010; 3:00 pm, ESPN Full Court		No. 24 Texas A&M	L 56-60	13-14 (2-10)	Ames, Iowa (13,031); Hilton Coliseum
February 24, 2010; 6:30 pm, ESPN Full Court		Nebraska	W 78-74	14-14- (3-10)	Ames, Iowa (11,163); Hilton Coliseum
February 27, 2010; 12:45 pm, ESPN Full Court		at Colorado	L 72-75	14-15 (3-11)	Coors Events Center (6,613); Boulder, Colorado
March 2, 2010; 7:00 pm, ESPN Full Court		Missouri	L 67-69 ^{OT}	14-16 (3-12)	Ames, Iowa (11,282); Hilton Coliseum
March 6, 2010; 5:00 pm, ESPN Full Court		at No. 5 Kansas State	W 85-82	15-16 (4-12)	Bramlage Coliseum (12,528); Manhattan, Kansas
Big 12 Tournament
March 10, 2010; 8:30 pm, ESPN Full Court		vs. Texas	L 75-82	15-17 (4-12)	Sprint Center (18,879); Kansas City, Missouri
*Non-conference game. ^{#}Rankings from AP poll. (#) Tournament seedings in parentheses. All times are in Central Time.

== Awards and honors ==
- All-Conference Selections

Craig Brackins (2nd Team)
Marquis Gilstrap (Honorable Mention)

- Ralph A. Olsen Award

Craig Brackins (2009)
