= 2010 Big 12 men's basketball tournament =

- Classification: Division I
- Season: 2009–10
- Teams: 12
- Site: Sprint Center; Kansas City, Missouri
- Champions: Kansas (7th title)
- Winning coach: Bill Self (4th title)
- MVP: Sherron Collins (Kansas)
- Attendance: 113,398 (overall); 19,003 (championship)
- Top scorer: Jacob Pullen (Kansas State) (58 points)
- Television: ESPN, Big 12 Network, ESPN2

2009–10 Big 12 men's basketball standings
	Conf.				Overall
Team	W		L	PCT	W		L	PCT
No. 1 Kansas†	15	–	1	.938	33	–	3	.917
No. 7 Kansas State	11	–	5	.688	29	–	8	.784
No. 19 Baylor	11	–	5	.688	28	–	8	.778
No. 23 Texas A&M	11	–	5	.688	24	–	10	.706
Missouri	10	–	6	.625	23	–	11	.676
Texas	9	–	7	.563	24	–	10	.706
Oklahoma State	9	–	7	.563	22	–	11	.667
Colorado	6	–	10	.375	15	–	16	.484
Texas Tech	4	–	12	.250	19	–	16	.543
Iowa State	4	–	12	.250	15	–	17	.469
Oklahoma	4	–	12	.250	13	–	18	.419
Nebraska	2	–	14	.125	15	–	18	.455
† 2010 Big 12 Tournament winner Rankings from AP poll

The 2010 Phillips 66 Big 12 Men's Basketball Championship was the 2010 edition of the Big 12 Conference's championship tournament held at Sprint Center in Kansas City, Missouri from March 10 until March 13, 2010. It was won by top-seeded Kansas. The all-tournament team consisted of Kansas' Sherron Collins and Cole Aldrich, Kansas State's Jacob Pullen and Denis Clemente, and Texas A&M's Donald Sloan.

== Seeding ==
The Tournament consisted of a 12 team single-elimination tournament with the top 4 seeds receiving a bye.

2010 Big 12 Men's Basketball Tournament seeds
Seed	School	Conf.	Over.	Tiebreaker
1	Kansas ‡#	15–1	33–3	
2	Kansas State #	11–5	29–8	1–0 vs. BU
3	Baylor #	11–5	28–8	1–1 vs. TAMU, 8–2 vs. division, 0–1 vs. BU
4	Texas A&M #	11–5	24–10	1–1 vs. BU, 7–3 vs. division
5	Missouri	10–6	23–11	
6	Texas	9–7	24–10	2–0 vs. OSU
7	Oklahoma State	9–7	22–11	0–2 vs. UT
8	Colorado	6–10	15–16	
9	Texas Tech	4–12	19–16	2–0 vs. OU
10	Oklahoma	4–12	13–18	0–2 vs. TT
11	Iowa State	4–12	15–17	0–2 vs. TT/OU
12	Nebraska	2–14	15–18	
‡ – Big 12 Conference regular season champions, and tournament No. 1 seed. # – Received a single-bye in the conference tournament. Overall records include all games played in the Big 12 Conference tournament.

== Schedule ==
Session	Game	Time	Matchup	Television	Attendance
First Round – Wednesday, March 10
1	1	11:30 am	#9 Texas Tech 82 vs #8 Colorado 67	Big 12 Network	18,879
1	2	2:00 pm	#12 Nebraska 75 vs #5 Missouri 60	Big 12 Network	18,879
2	3	6:00 pm	#7 Oklahoma State 81 vs #10 Oklahoma 67	Big 12 Network	18,879
2	5	11:30 am	#1 Kansas 80 vs #9 Texas Tech 68	Big 12 Network	18,879
Quarterfinals – Thursday, March 11
3	5	11:30 am	#1 Kansas 80 vs #9 Texas Tech 68	ESPN2	18,879
3	6	2:00 pm	#4 Texas A&M 70 vs #12 Nebraska 64	Big 12 Network	18,879
4	7	6:00 pm	#2 Kansas State 83 vs #7 Oklahoma State 64	Big 12 Network	18,879
4	8	8:30 pm	#3 Baylor 86 vs #6 Texas 67	ESPN2	18,879
Semifinals – Friday, March 12
5	9	6:00 pm	#1 Kansas 79 vs #4 Texas A&M 66	Big 12 Network	18,879
5	10	8:30 pm	#2 Kansas State 82 vs #3 Baylor 75	Big 12 Network	18,879
Final – Saturday, March 13
6	11	5:00 pm	#1 Kansas 72 vs #2 Kansas State 64	ESPN	19,003
Game times in CT. #-Rankings denote tournament seed

== Tournament bracket ==
First Round; Wednesday, March 10
8	Colorado	67
9	Texas Tech	82
5	Missouri	60
12	Nebraska	75
6	Texas	82
11	Iowa State	75
7	Oklahoma State	81
10	Oklahoma	67

Quarterfinals; Thursday, March 11
1	Kansas (#1)	80
9	Texas Tech	68
4	Texas A&M (#23)	70
12	Nebraska	64
3	Baylor (#21)	86
6	Texas	67
2	Kansas State (#9)	83
7	Oklahoma State	64

Semifinals; Friday, March 12
1	Kansas (#1)	79
4	Texas A&M (#23)	66
3	Baylor (#21)	75
2	Kansas State (#9)	82

Finals; Saturday, March 13
1	Kansas (#1)	72
2	Kansas State (#9)	64

Asterisk denotes game ended in overtime.
Rankings reflect AP Poll for the week of 3/8/2010.

== All-Tournament Team ==
Most Outstanding Player – Sherron Collins, Kansas

Player	Team	Position	Class
Sherron Collins	Kansas	Sr.	G
Cole Aldrich	Kansas	Jr.	C
Denis Clemente	Kansas State	Sr.	G
Jacob Pullen	Kansas State	Jr.	G
Donald Sloan	Texas A&M	Sr.	G

== See also ==
- 2010 Big 12 Conference women's basketball tournament
- 2010 NCAA Division I men's basketball tournament
- 2009–10 NCAA Division I men's basketball rankings
