= 2009–10 Oklahoma State Cowboys basketball team =

American college basketball season

2009–10 Oklahoma State Cowboys basketball

Las Vegas Invitational Champions

NCAA tournament, Round of 64
- Conference: Big 12 Conference
- Record: 22–11 (9–7 Big 12)
- Head coach: Travis Ford
- Assistant coaches: Butch Pierre; Chris Ferguson; Steve Middleton
- Home arena: Gallagher-Iba Arena

2009–10 Big 12 men's basketball standings
	Conf.				Overall
Team	W		L	PCT	W		L	PCT
No. 1 Kansas†	15	–	1	.938	33	–	3	.917
No. 7 Kansas State	11	–	5	.688	29	–	8	.784
No. 19 Baylor	11	–	5	.688	28	–	8	.778
No. 23 Texas A&M	11	–	5	.688	24	–	10	.706
Missouri	10	–	6	.625	23	–	11	.676
Texas	9	–	7	.563	24	–	10	.706
Oklahoma State	9	–	7	.563	22	–	11	.667
Colorado	6	–	10	.375	15	–	16	.484
Texas Tech	4	–	12	.250	19	–	16	.543
Iowa State	4	–	12	.250	15	–	17	.469
Oklahoma	4	–	12	.250	13	–	18	.419
Nebraska	2	–	14	.125	15	–	18	.455
† 2010 Big 12 Tournament winner Rankings from AP poll

The 2009–10 Oklahoma State Cowboys men's basketball team represented Oklahoma State University in the 2009–10 NCAA Division I men's basketball season. This was head coach Travis Ford's second season at Oklahoma State. The Cowboys competed in the Big 12 Conference and played their home games at Gallagher-Iba Arena. They finished the season 22–11, 9–7 in Big 12 play. They lost in the quarterfinals of the 2010 Big 12 men's basketball tournament. They received an at–large bid to the 2010 NCAA Division I men's basketball tournament, earning a 7 seed in the Midwest Region, where they lost to 10 seed Georgia Tech in the first round.

== Pre-season ==
In the Big 12 preseason polls, released October 14, Oklahoma State was selected to finish sixth in the Big 12 coaches poll.

== Roster ==
#	Name	Height	Weight (lbs.)	Position	Class	Hometown	Previous Team(s)
1	Jarred Shaw	6'10"	230	F/C	Fr.	Dallas, TX, U.S.	Carter HS
2	Obi Muonelo	6'5"	220	G	Sr.	Edmond, OK, U.S.	Santa Fe HS
5	Reger Dowell	6'1"	180	G	Fr.	Duncanville, TX, U.S.	Duncanville HS
10	Torin Walker	6'11"	245	F C	Fr.	Columbus, GA, U.S.	Northside HS
12	Keiton Page	5'9"	170	G	So.	Pawnee, OK, U.S.	Pawnee HS
14	Ray Penn	5'9"	165	G	Fr.	Houston, TX, U.S.	Travis HS
15	Nick Sidorakis	6'4"	185	G	Jr.	Jenks, OK, U.S.	Jenks HS
21	Fred Gulley	6'2"	175	G	Fr.	Fayetteville, AR, U.S.	Fayetteville HS
23	James Anderson	6'6"	210	G	Jr.	Junction City, AR, U.S.	Junction City HS
25	Garrett Thomas	6'2"	180	G	Jr.	Edmond, OK, U.S.	Edmond Memorial HS
31	Matt Pilgrim	6'8"	235	F	Jr.	Cincinnati, OH, U.S.	Bridgton Academy; Hampton
32	Roger Franklin	6'5"	220	F	Fr.	Duncanville, TX, U.S.	Duncanville HS
33	Marshall Moses	6'7"	240	F	Jr.	Aiken, SC, U.S.	The Patterson School
41	Steven Cantrell	6'6"	210	F	So.	Broken Arrow, OK, U.S.	Broken Arrow HS; Oklahoma City
43	Lee Ledford	6'0"	180	G	So.	Perkins, OK, U.S.	Perkins-Tryon HS

== Schedule and results ==
- All times are Central

Date time, TV	Rank^{#}	Opponent^{#}	Result	Record	Site (attendance) city, state
Exhibition
11/7/2009*; 7:00pm		Central Oklahoma	W 89–80		Gallagher-Iba Arena (3,946); Stillwater, OK
11/10/2009*; 7:00pm		Dillard	W 97–55		Gallagher-Iba Arena (4,007); Stillwater, OK
Regular Season
11/14/2009*; 1:30pm		Seattle; Las Vegas Invitational	W 86–64	1–0	Gallagher-Iba Arena (5,672); Stillwater, OK
11/18/2009*; 7:05pm		Southern; Las Vegas Invitational	W 93–61	2–0	Gallagher-Iba Arena (4,029); Stillwater, OK
11/21/2009*; 1:05pm		North Texas	W 82–68	3–0	Gallagher-Iba Arena (4,118); Stillwater, OK
11/24/2009*; 7:00pm		Prairie View A&M	W 80–58	4–0	Gallagher-Iba Arena (4,132); Stillwater, OK
11/27/2009*; 7:00pm		vs. Bradley; Las Vegas Invitational semifinals	W 68–57	5–0	Orleans Arena (NA); Las Vegas, NV
11/28/2009*; 9:30pm		vs. Utah; Las Vegas Invitational championship	W 77–55	6–0	Orleans Arena (NA); Las Vegas, NV
12/2/2009*; 7:05am		at Tulsa	L 86–65	6–1	Reynolds Center (8,455); Tulsa, OK
12/5/2009*; 3:05pm		UT–San Antonio	W 61–55	7–1	Gallagher-Iba Arena (10,889); Stillwater, OK
12/13/2009*; 3:05pm		Arkansas–Pine Bluff	W 81–66	8–1	Gallagher-Iba Arena (10,981); Stillwater, OK
12/16/2009*; 10:00pm, FSN		at Stanford; Big 12/Pac-10 Hardwood Series	W 71–70	9–1	Maples Pavilion (6,427); Stanford, CA
12/21/2009*; 7:30pm, ESPN2		vs. La Salle; All-College Basketball Classic	W 77–62	10–1	Ford Center (8,681); Oklahoma City, OK
12/29/2009*; 7:05pm		Pacific	W 66–50	11–1	Gallagher-Iba Arena (13,590); Stillwater, OK
1/2/2010*; 1:00pm, ESPNU		vs. Rhode Island	L 63–59	11–2	Mohegan Sun Arena (7,111); Uncasville, CT
1/5/2010*; 7:05pm		Coppin State	W 79–61	12–2	Gallagher-Iba Arena (10,991); Stillwater, OK
1/9/2010; 7:05pm		No. 20 Texas Tech	W 81–52	13–2 (1–0)	Gallagher-Iba Arena (11,548); Stillwater, OK
1/11/2010; 8:00pm, ESPN		at Oklahoma; Bedlam	L 62–57 ^{OT}	13–3 (1–1)	Lloyd Noble Center (11,143); Norman, OK
1/16/2010; 3:00pm, Big 12 Network		at No. 22 Baylor	L 83–70	13–4 (1–2)	Ferrell Center (9,223); Waco, TX
1/20/2010; 8:00pm, ESPNU		Colorado	W 90–78	14–4 (2–2)	Gallagher-Iba Arena (11,244); Stillwater, OK
1/23/2010; 3:00pm, Big 12 Network		No. 10 Kansas State	W 73–69	15–4 (3–2)	Bramlage Coliseum (12,528); Manhattan, KS
1/27/2010; 6:30pm, ESPN2		at Texas A&M	W 76–69	16–4 (4–2)	Gallagher-Iba Arena (11,328); Stillwater, OK
1/30/2010; 1:00pm, ESPN		at Missouri	L 95–80	16–5 (4–3)	Mizzou Arena (15,061); Columbia, MO
2/1/2010; 8:00pm, ESPN		No. 9 Texas	L 72–60	16–6 (4–4)	Gallagher-Iba Arena (11,096); Stillwater, OK
2/6/2010; 12:30pm, Big 12 Network		at Texas Tech	L 81–74	16–7 (4–5)	United Spirit Arena (9,508); Lubbock, TX
2/13/2010; 1:00pm, ESPN		Oklahoma; Bedlam	W 97–76	17–7 (5–5)	Gallagher-Iba Arena (12,380); Stillwater, OK
2/17/2010; 7:00pm, Big 12 Network		at Iowa State	W 69–64	18–7 (6–5)	Hilton Coliseum (11,360); Ames, IA
2/20/2010; 12:30pm, Big 12 Network		at No. 22 Baylor	W 82–75	19–7 (7–5)	Gallagher-Iba Arena (11,722); Stillwater, OK
2/24/2010; 8:00pm, ESPN2		No. 21 Texas	L 69–59	19–8 (7–6)	Frank Erwin Center (15,052); Austin, TX
2/27/2010; 3:00pm, CBS		No. 1 Kansas	W 85–77	20–8 (8–6)	Gallagher-Iba Arena (13,611); Stillwater, OK
3/3/2010; 8:00pm, ESPN2		at No. 23 Texas A&M	L 76–61	20–9 (8–7)	Reed Arena (11,488); College Station, TX
3/6/2010; 3:00pm, Big 12 Network		Nebraska	W 74–55	21–9 (9–7)	Gallagher-Iba Arena (12,018); Stillwater, OK
2010 Big 12 men's basketball tournament
3/10/2010; 6:00pm, Big 12 Network	(7)	vs. (10) Oklahoma; First Round	W 81–67	22–9	Sprint Center (18,879); St. Louis, MO
3/11/2010; 6:00pm, Big 12 Network	(7)	vs. (2) No. 9 Kansas State; Quarterfinals	L 83–64	22–10	Sprint Center (18,879); St. Louis, MO
2010 NCAA Division I men's basketball tournament
3/19/2010; 6:15pm, CBS	(7 MW)	vs. (10 MW) Georgia Tech; First Round	L 64–59	22–11	Bradley Center (17,580); Milwaukee, WI
*Non-conference game. ^{#}Rankings from AP Poll. (#) Tournament seedings in parentheses.
