= 2009–10 Texas Tech Red Raiders basketball team =

American college basketball season

2009–10 Texas Tech Red Raiders basketball

NIT Quarterfinals, L, 90-87 2OT v. Ole Miss
- Conference: Big 12
- South
- Record: 19–16 (4–12 Big 12)
- Head coach: Pat Knight (2nd season)
- Assistant coaches: Chris Beard (9th season); Stew Robinson (7th season); Bubba Jennings (2nd season)
- Home arena: United Spirit Arena

2009–10 Big 12 men's basketball standings
	Conf.				Overall
Team	W		L	PCT	W		L	PCT
No. 1 Kansas†	15	–	1	.938	33	–	3	.917
No. 7 Kansas State	11	–	5	.688	29	–	8	.784
No. 19 Baylor	11	–	5	.688	28	–	8	.778
No. 23 Texas A&M	11	–	5	.688	24	–	10	.706
Missouri	10	–	6	.625	23	–	11	.676
Texas	9	–	7	.563	24	–	10	.706
Oklahoma State	9	–	7	.563	22	–	11	.667
Colorado	6	–	10	.375	15	–	16	.484
Texas Tech	4	–	12	.250	19	–	16	.543
Iowa State	4	–	12	.250	15	–	17	.469
Oklahoma	4	–	12	.250	13	–	18	.419
Nebraska	2	–	14	.125	15	–	18	.455
† 2010 Big 12 Tournament winner Rankings from AP poll

The 2009-10 Texas Tech Red Raiders men's basketball team represented Texas Tech University in the 2009-10 NCAA Division I men's basketball season. The Red Raiders' were led by Pat Knight in his second full season as head coach. The team played its home games in the United Spirit Arena in Lubbock, Texas and are members of the Big 12 Conference. They finished the season 19–16, 4–12 in Big 12 play. They advanced to the quarterfinals of the 2010 Big 12 men's basketball tournament before falling to #1 Kansas. They were invited to the 2010 National Invitation Tournament where they advanced to the quarterfinals before falling to Mississippi.

== Recruiting ==
=== 2009 ===
College recruiting
Name	Hometown	School	Height	Weight	Commit date
Jaye Crockett; SF	Clovis, New Mexico	Clovis HS	6 ft 6 in (1.98 m)	190 lb (86 kg)	May 6, 2008
Jaye Crockett; SF	Recruit ratings: Scout: Rivals: (88)				
Mike Davis; PG	Houston, Texas	Wheatley High School	6 ft 3 in (1.91 m)	190 lb (86 kg)	Sep 14, 2008
Mike Davis; PG	Recruit ratings: Scout: Rivals: (86)				

=== Transfers ===
College recruiting
Name	Hometown	School	Height	Weight	Commit date
Theron Jenkins; SF	Fulton, Mississippi	Itawamba Community College	6 ft 6 in (1.98 m)	211 lb (96 kg)	Transfer
Theron Jenkins; SF	Recruit ratings: Scout: Rivals: (N/A)				
Brad Reese; SF	Panama City, Florida	Gulf Coast Community College	6 ft 6 in (1.98 m)	200 lb (91 kg)	Transfer
Brad Reese; SF	Recruit ratings: Scout: Rivals: (N/A)				
David Tairu; SG	Levelland, Texas	South Plains College	6 ft 3 in (1.91 m)	177 lb (80 kg)	Transfer
David Tairu; SG	Recruit ratings: Scout: Rivals: (N/A)				
Overall recruit ranking:
Note: In many cases, Scout, Rivals, 247Sports, On3, and ESPN may conflict in their listings of height and weight.; In these cases, the average was taken. ESPN grades are on a 100-point scale.; Sources: "Texas Tech 2009 Basketball Commitments". Rivals.; "2009 Texas Tech Basketball Commits". Scout.; "ESPN". ESPN.; "Scout.com Team Recruiting Rankings". Scout.; "2009 Team Ranking". Rivals.

== Schedule ==
Date time, TV	Rank^{#}	Opponent^{#}	Result	Record	Site (attendance) city, state
Regular season
11/13/09*; 6:00 pm		South Dakota; Duel in the Desert	W 88–49	1–0	United Spirit Arena (8,541); Lubbock, Texas
11/14/09*; 6:00 pm		Texas A&M–Corpus Christi; Duel in the Desert	W 66–59	2–0	United Spirit Arena (7,761); Lubbock, Texas
11/15/09*; 3:00 pm		Oregon State; Duel in the Desert	W 64–60	3–0	United Spirit Arena (7,860); Lubbock, Texas
11/19/09*; 7:00 pm		Northwestern State	W 94–75	4–0	United Spirit Arena (7,913); Lubbock, Texas
11/21/09*; 7:00 pm		Lamar	W 77–54	5–0	United Spirit Arena (8,783); Lubbock, Texas
11/24/09*; 7:00 pm		at Stephen F. Austin	W 63–61	6–0	William R. Johnson Coliseum (3,752); Nacogdoches, Texas
11/28/09*; 3:30 pm		Samford	W 74–53	7–0	United Spirit Arena (7,930); Lubbock, Texas
12/03/09*; 6:00 pm, ESPN2		No. 10 Washington; Big 12/Pac-10 Hardwood Series	W 99–92 ^{OT}	8–0	United Spirit Arena (9,912); Lubbock, Texas
12/08/09*; 6:30 pm, The Mtn.	No. 23	at TCU	W 80–70	9–0	Daniel-Meyer Coliseum (5,825); Fort Worth, Texas
12/19/09*; 7:05 pm	No. 16	at Wichita State	L 85–83	9–1	Charles Koch Arena (10,506); Wichita, Kansas
12/22/09*; 7:00 pm	No. 23	Stanford	W 100–87	10–1	United Spirit Arena (13,617); Lubbock, Texas
12/29/09*; 7:00 pm, CBS College Sports	No. 20	at No. 19 New Mexico	L 90–75	10–2	University Arena (14,586); Albuquerque, New Mexico
01/01/09*; 2:00 pm	No. 20	McNeese State	W 76–75	11–2	United Spirit Arena (9,972); Lubbock, Texas
01/03/09*; 2:00 pm, ESPN360	No. 20	UTEP	W 86–78	12–2	United Spirit Arena (8,029); Lubbock, Texas
01/09/09; 7:00 pm, ESPN360	No. 20	at Oklahoma State	L 81–52	12–3 (0–1)	Gallagher-Iba Arena (11,548); Stillwater, Oklahoma
01/13/10; 8:00 pm, ESPNU		Missouri	L 94–89 ^{OT}	12–4 (0–2)	United Spirit Arena (9,788); Lubbock, Texas
01/16/10; 12:45 pm, ESPN360		at No. 3 Kansas	L 89–63	12–5 (0–3)	Allen Fieldhouse (16,300); Lawrence, Kansas
01/20/10; 6:30 pm, ESPN360		Iowa State	W 78–71	13–5 (1–3)	United Spirit Arena (8,410); Lubbock, Texas
01/23/10; 7:00 pm, ESPN360		Oklahoma	W 75–65	14–5 (2–3)	United Spirit Arena (10,408); Lubbock, Texas
01/27/10; 8:00 pm, ESPNU		at No. 6 Texas	L 95–83	14–6 (2–4)	Frank Erwin Center (16,414); Austin, Texas
01/30/10; 8:00 pm		at Texas A&M	L 85–70	14–7 (2–5)	Reed Arena (13,648); College Station, Texas
02/06/10; 12:30 pm, ESPN360		Oklahoma State	W 81–74	15–7 (3–5)	United Spirit Arena (9,508); Lubbock, Texas
02/09/10; 7:00 pm, ESPN360		at Oklahoma	W 72–71	16–7 (4–5)	Lloyd Noble Center (10,323); Norman, Oklahoma
02/13/10; 4:00 pm, ESPN2		Texas A&M	L 67–65	16–8 (4–6)	United Spirit Arena (11,453); Lubbock, Texas
02/16/10; 7:00 pm, ESPN360		at No. 22 Baylor	L 88–70	16–9 (4–7)	Ferrell Center (9,391); Waco, Texas
02/20/10; 1:00 pm, ESPN		No. 15 Texas	L 71–67	16–10 (4–8)	United Spirit Arena (12,481); Lubbock, Texas
02/23/10; 7:00 pm, ESPN360		No. 6 Kansas State	L 83–64	16–11 (4–9)	United Spirit Arena (9,447); Lubbock, Texas
02/27/10; 3:00 pm, ESPN360		at Nebraska	L 83–79 ^{2OT}	16–12 (4–10)	Bob Devaney Sports Center (10,785); Lincoln, Nebraska
03/02/10; 7:00 pm, ESPN360		No. 21 Baylor	L 86–68	16–13 (4–11)	United Spirit Arena (9,232); Lubbock, Texas
03/06/10; 3:00 pm, ESPN360		at Colorado	L 101–90	16–14 (4–12)	Coors Events Center (8,826); Boulder, Colorado
Phillips 66 Big 12 Championship
03/10/10; 11:30 am, ESPN360		vs. Colorado; First Round	W 82–67	17–14	Sprint Center (18,879); Kansas City, Missouri
03/11/10; 11:30 am, ESPN2		vs. No. 1 Kansas; Quarterfinals	L 80–68	17–15	Sprint Center (18,879); Kansas City, Missouri
National Invitation Tournament
03/16/10; 8:00 pm, ESPN2		at Seton Hall; First Round	W 87–69	18–15	Prudential Center (1,829); Newark, New Jersey
03/20/10; 2:00 pm		Jacksonville; Second Round	W 69–64	19–15	United Spirit Arena (5,465); Lubbock, Texas
03/23/10; 6:00 pm, ESPN		at Ole Miss; Quarterfinals	L 90–87 ^{2OT}	19–16	Tad Smith Coliseum (6,014); Oxford, Mississippi
*Non-conference game. ^{#}Rankings from AP Poll. (#) Tournament seedings in parentheses. All times are in Central Time.

== Rankings ==
Ranking movement Legend: ██ Increase in ranking. ██ Decrease in ranking.
Poll	Pre	Wk 1	Wk 2	Wk 3	Wk 4	Wk 5	Wk 6	Wk 7	Wk 8	Wk 9	Wk 10	Wk 11	Wk 12	Wk 13	Wk 14	Wk 15	Wk 16	Wk 17	Wk 18	Final
AP	NR	NR	NR	RV	23	16	23	20	22	RV	NR	NR	NR	NR	NR	NR	NR	NR	NR	
Coaches	NR	NR	NR	RV	RV	20	RV	24	RV	RV	NR	NR	NR	NR	NR	NR	NR	NR	NR	

== See also ==
- 2010 NCAA Men's Division I Basketball Tournament
- 2010 Big 12 men's basketball tournament
- 2009-10 NCAA Division I men's basketball season
