= 2009–10 Nebraska Cornhuskers men's basketball team =

American college basketball season

2009–10 Nebraska Cornhuskers men's basketball
- Conference: Big 12 Conference
- Record: 15-18 (2-14 Big 12)
- Head coach: Doc Sadler (4th season)
- Assistant coaches: Philip Mathews; David Anwar; Walter Roese
- Home arena: Bob Devaney Sports Center

2009–10 Big 12 men's basketball standings
	Conf.				Overall
Team	W		L	PCT	W		L	PCT
No. 1 Kansas†	15	–	1	.938	33	–	3	.917
No. 7 Kansas State	11	–	5	.688	29	–	8	.784
No. 19 Baylor	11	–	5	.688	28	–	8	.778
No. 23 Texas A&M	11	–	5	.688	24	–	10	.706
Missouri	10	–	6	.625	23	–	11	.676
Texas	9	–	7	.563	24	–	10	.706
Oklahoma State	9	–	7	.563	22	–	11	.667
Colorado	6	–	10	.375	15	–	16	.484
Texas Tech	4	–	12	.250	19	–	16	.543
Iowa State	4	–	12	.250	15	–	17	.469
Oklahoma	4	–	12	.250	13	–	18	.419
Nebraska	2	–	14	.125	15	–	18	.455
† 2010 Big 12 Tournament winner Rankings from AP poll

The 2009–10 Nebraska Cornhuskers men's basketball team represented the University of Nebraska–Lincoln in the 2009–10 college basketball season. Head coach Doc Sadler entered his 4th season at Nebraska. The Cornhuskers competed in the Big 12 Conference and played their home games at the Bob Devaney Sports Center. They finished with a record of 15-18 overall and 2-12 in Big 12 Conference play. Nebraska defeated Missouri in the first round of the 2010 Big 12 men's basketball tournament before being eliminated by Texas A&M in the semifinals.

== Roster ==
2009–10 Nebraska Cornhuskers men's basketball team
Players
Coaches

Pos.	#	Name	Height	Weight	Year	Hometown
G	1	Eshaunte Jones	6 ft 4 in (1.93 m)	190 lb (86 kg)	RS Fr	Fort Wayne, IN
G	2	Myles Holley	6 ft 4 in (1.93 m)	190 lb (86 kg)	So	Norfolk, VA
G	3	Brandon Richardson	6 ft 0 in (1.83 m)	190 lb (86 kg)	So	Los Angeles, CA
G	5	Sek Henry	6 ft 4 in (1.93 m)	200 lb (91 kg)	Sr	Los Angeles, CA
F	11	Christian Standhardinger	6 ft 8 in (2.03 m)	210 lb (95 kg)	Fr	Munich, GER
G	12	Matt Karn	6 ft 3 in (1.91 m)	190 lb (86 kg)	RS Sr	Philpot, KY
F	13	Brandon Ubel	6 ft 10 in (2.08 m)	220 lb (100 kg)	Fr	Overland Park, KS
C	14	Christopher Niemann	6 ft 11 in (2.11 m)	275 lb (125 kg)	So	Kühlungsborn, GER
G	15	Ray Gallegos	6 ft 3 in (1.91 m)	175 lb (79 kg)	Fr	Salt Lake City, UT
G	20	Drake Beranek	6 ft 3 in (1.91 m)	185 lb (84 kg)	Sr	Ravenna, NE
C	21	Jorge Brian Diaz	6 ft 11 in (2.11 m)	235 lb (107 kg)	RS Fr	Caguas, PR
F	23	Quincy Hankins-Cole	6 ft 8 in (2.03 m)	240 lb (109 kg)	Jr	Roosevelt, NY
G	30	Toney McCray	6 ft 6 in (1.98 m)	205 lb (93 kg)	So	Missouri City, TX
F	33	Mike Fox	6 ft 4 in (1.93 m)	195 lb (88 kg)	RS Fr	Beatrice, NE
G	34	Lance Jeter	6 ft 3 in (1.91 m)	225 lb (102 kg)	Jr	Beaver Falls, PA
F	35	Ben Nelson	6 ft 9 in (2.06 m)	230 lb (104 kg)	Sr	Atwater, MN
G	44	Ryan Anderson	6 ft 4 in (1.93 m)	205 lb (93 kg)	Fr	Seattle, WA

Head coach

- Doc Sadler (Arkansas)

Assistant coach(es)

- Chris Croft (Southern Miss)
- David Anwar (Fitchburg State)
- Jim Shaw (Grinnell)

Legend

- (C) Team captain
- (S) Suspended
- (I) Ineligible
- (W) Walk-on
- Injured
- Current redshirt

== Schedule and results ==
Date time, TV	Rank^{#}	Opponent^{#}	Result	Record	Site (attendance) city, state
Exhibition
11/06/2009*; 7:05 pm		Arkansas–Fort Smith	W 86–66	–	Bob Devaney Sports Center (9,406); Lincoln, NE
11/10/2009*; 7:05 pm		Hastings College	W 71–39	–	Bob Devaney Sports Center (9,312); Lincoln, NE
Regular Season
11/14/2009*; 7:05 pm		USC Upstate	W 76–49	1–0	Bob Devaney Sports Center (9,090); Lincoln, NE
11/18/2009*; 7:00 pm, FSMW		Saint Louis	L 55–69	1–1	Bob Devaney Sports Center (7,596); Lincoln, NE
11/21/2009*; 1:05 pm		TCU	W 90–77	2–1	Bob Devaney Sports Center (9,799); Lincoln, NE
11/24/2009*; 7:05 pm, FSMW		UMKC	W 70–48	3–1	Bob Devaney Sports Center (9,415); Lincoln, NE
11/29/2009*; 1:30 pm, FSN		at USC	W 51–48	4–1	Galen Center (4,214); Los Angeles, CA
12/02/2009*; 7:05 pm		Texas–Pan American	W 81–53	5–1	Bob Devaney Sports Center (9,077); Lincoln, NE
12/06/2009*; 4:05 pm		at Creighton; Rivalry	L 61–67	5–2	Qwest Center Omaha (16,739); Omaha, NE
12/10/2009*; 7:05 pm, FSMW		Chicago State	W 74–39	6–2	Bob Devaney Sports Center (9,909); Lincoln, NE
12/12/2009*; 7:05 pm, FSMW		Oregon State	W 50–44	7–2	Bob Devaney Sports Center (10,553); Lincoln, NE
12/19/2009*; 7:05 pm, FSMW		Jackson State	W 57–41	8–2	Bob Devaney Sports Center (9,358); Lincoln, NE
12/22/2009*; 2:30 pm		vs. Tulsa; HoopTV Las Vegas Classic First Round	W 74–40	9–2	Orleans Arena; Las Vegas, NV
12/23/2009*; 7:30 pm		vs. BYU; HoopTV Las Vegas Classic Championship	L 66–88	9–3	Orleans Arena; Las Vegas, NV
12/29/2009*; 7:05 pm		Southern Utah	W 94–61	10-3	Bob Devaney Sports Center (8,653); Lincoln, NE
01/02/2010*; 3:05 pm		Maryland Eastern Shore	W 74–60	11–3	Bob Devaney Sports Center (8,483); Lincoln, NE
01/05/2010*; 7:05 pm		Southeastern Louisiana	W 77–59	12–3	Bob Devaney Sports Center (7,989); Lincoln, NE
01/09/2010; 3:00 pm, B12N		at Texas A&M	L 53–64	12–4 (0–1)	Reed Arena (9,628); College Station, TX
01/13/2010; 8:05 pm, ESPN2		No. 3 Kansas	L 72–84	12–5 (0–2)	Bob Devaney Sports Center (12,990); Lincoln, NE
01/16/2010; 7:05 pm, FSMW		Iowa State	L 53–56	12–6 (0–3)	Bob Devaney Sports Center (11,367); Lincoln, NE
01/23/2010; 5:05 pm, B12N		at Missouri	L 53–70	12–7 (0–4)	Mizzou Arena (15,061); Columbia, MO
01/27/2010; 8:05 pm		at Colorado	L 60–72	12–8 (0–5)	Coors Events Center (7,108); Boulder, CO
01/30/2010; 7:05 pm		Oklahoma	W 63–46	13–8 (1–5)	Bob Devaney Sports Center (10,854); Lincoln, NE
02/02/2010; 7:05 pm, B12N		No. 10 Kansas State	L 57–76	13–9 (1–6)	Bob Devaney Sports Center (10,453); Lincoln, NE
02/06/2010; 5:05 pm, ESPNU		at No. 1 Kansas	L 64–75	13–10 (1–7)	Allen Fieldhouse (16,300); Lawrence, KS
02/10/2010; 8:05 pm, ESPN2		No. 24 Baylor	L 53–55	13–11 (1–8)	Bob Devaney Sports Center (9,787); Lincoln, NE
02/13/2010; 3:00 pm, B12N		at No. 14 Texas	L 51–91	13–12 (1–9)	Erwin Center (16,734); Austin, TX
02/17/2010; 6:10 pm, FSMW		at No. 7 Kansas State	L 87–91	13–13 (1–10)	Bramlage Coliseum (12,528); Manhattan, KS
02/20/2010; 5:05 pm, B12N		Missouri	L 59–74	13–14 (1–11)	Bob Devaney Sports Center (10,979); Lincoln, NE
02/24/2010; 6:30 pm, FSMW		at Iowa State	L 74–78	13–15 (1–12)	Hilton Coliseum (11,163); Ames, IA
02/27/2010; 3:00 pm, B12N		Texas Tech	W 83–79 ^{2OT}	14–15 (2–12)	Bob Devaney Sports Center (10,785); Lincoln, NE
03/02/2010; 7:05 pm, FSMW		Colorado	L 68–81	14–16 (2–13)	Bob Devaney Sports Center (9,803); Lincoln, NE
03/06/2010; 12:45 pm, B12N		at Oklahoma State	L 55–74	14–17 (2-14)	Gallagher-Iba Arena (12,018); Stillwater, OK
Phillips 66 2010 Big 12 men's basketball tournament
03/10/2010; 2:00 pm, ESPN2/B12N		vs. Missouri; First Round	W 75–60	15–17	Sprint Center (18,879); Kansas City, MO
03/11/2010; 2:00 pm, B12N		vs. No. 23 Texas A&M; Quarterfinals	L 64–70	15–18	Sprint Center (18,879); Kansas City, MO
*Non-conference game. ^{#}Rankings from Coaches' Poll. (#) Tournament seedings in parentheses. All times are in Central Time.
