= Sherron Collins =

American professional basketball player

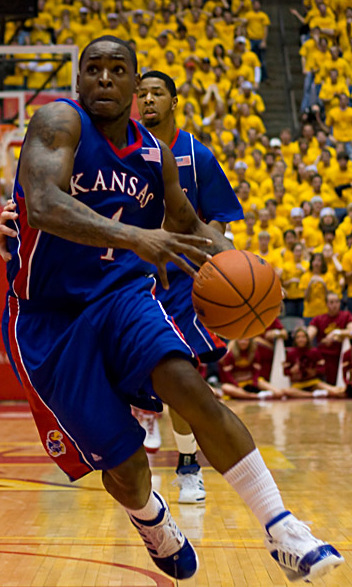
- Collins playing for Kansas in 2009

Personal information
- Born: March 18, 1987 (age 39) Chicago, Illinois, U.S.
- Listed height: 5 ft 11 in (1.80 m)
- Listed weight: 205 lb (93 kg)

Career information
- High school: Richard T. Crane Tech (Chicago, Illinois)
- College: Kansas (2006–2010)
- NBA draft: 2010: undrafted
- Playing career: 2010–2018
- Position: Point guard
- Number: 11
- Coaching career: 2022–present

Career history

Playing
- 2010–2011: Charlotte Bobcats
- 2010: →Maine Red Claws
- 2011–2012: Hacettepe Üniversitesi
- 2014–2015: Texas Legends
- 2016: Windsor Express
- 2018: Kansas City Tornados

Coaching
- 2022–2023: Lawrence Free State HS
- 2023–present: Oak Park HS

Career highlights
- NCAA champion (2008); Consensus first-team All-American (2010); Consensus second-team All-American (2009); Lute Olson Award (2010); Frances Pomeroy Naismith Award (2010); 2x First-team All-Big 12 (2009–2010); All-Big 12 Sixth Man of the Year (2008); Big 12 All-Rookie Team (2007); No. 4 retired by Kansas Jayhawks; McDonald's All-American (2006); Third-team Parade All-American (2006)
- Stats at NBA.com
- Stats at Basketball Reference

Sherron Marlon Collins (born March 18, 1987) is an American former professional basketball player who is currently the head coach for Oak Park High School in Kansas City, Missouri. He formerly played for the Charlotte Bobcats of the National Basketball Association (NBA) and Kansas City Tornados of the NAPB (NAPB). He has also played for the Texas Legends and Maine Red Claws of the NBA D-League and Hacettepe Üniversitesi in the Turkish Basketball League. As an All-American member of the Kansas Jayhawks men's basketball team, he earned a national championship in the 2008 NCAA Men's Division I Basketball Tournament, three Big 12 men's basketball tournament championships, and four consecutive Big 12 Conference regular season championships. He was regarded as one of the leaders of the team and was its captain during his senior year.

Collins grew up in Chicago where he was a multisport standout athlete at Crane High School. He was regarded as the second best point guard in the nation by Scout.com and was considered one of the two best class of 2006 basketball prospects in the state of Illinois (along with Jon Scheyer).

Collins was a well-decorated basketball player at Kansas. He was unanimously selected to the Big 12 All-Freshman Team for the 2006–07 Kansas Jayhawks men's basketball team. After leading the 2008–09 Kansas Jayhawks men's basketball team to the Big 12 Conference regular season title, Collins was named to the 2009 first team All-Big 12 team. That season, he was named a consensus second team 2009 NCAA Men's Basketball All-American. He was also a consensus first team 2010 NCAA Men's Basketball All-American as a senior and earned the Most Outstanding Player award while leading his team to the 2010 Big 12 men's basketball tournament championship. He was included on many of the watchlists for the most prestigious college basketball awards as both a junior and senior. Collins holds the school record for most consecutive free throws.

Following his senior season, Collins was eligible for the 2010 NBA draft but went undrafted. Shortly after, he signed a free-agent contract with the Charlotte Bobcats and participated in their summer camp. He represented them in the Orlando Summer League before being signed for the regular season. In October 2012, he signed with the San Antonio Spurs, but he did not make their final roster.

== Early life ==
Collins was born in Chicago, Illinois to Stacey Harris. While growing up in Chicago he overcame the adversity of a father who periodically spent time in jail as well as an environment filled with gang life. He lost his best friend to gunfire at the age of 16. Collins had two children by the time of his National Championship season: Sherron Jr. and Sherr'mari Marlon Collins (born April 6, 2007; mother is Re'Quiya Aguirre). In 2006, he dealt with the death of his first born and the following year, he endured a sex scandal.

Growing up, Collins was very active playing several sports including football, basketball, and baseball. In 2002, Collins began his high school career at Crane Tech Prep High School. During his time at Crane, Collins was a standout multi-sport athlete, playing wide-receiver/free safety on the football team and pitching for the baseball team. On the basketball court, Collins averaged 19.8 points, 3.1 rebounds and 5.1 assists as a junior during the 2004–05 season. During his senior season, he averaged 33 points, 8 rebounds and 6 assists for the Cougars. He was regarded as the number 2 Chicago metropolitan area and Illinois basketball prospect in the class of 2006 behind Jon Scheyer. As a result, he was named a McDonald's All-American as well as a third-team Parade All-American. He was selected as a First-Team All-State selection in 2006. Additionally, Collins played in the Michael Jordan All-American Classic in April 2006. Scout.com ranked him as the number 2 point guard in the nation. He was the No. 21-ranked player in the class of 2006 and the No. 4-ranked point guard by Rivals.com. Collins helped guide Crane to the 2003 and 2005 conference and city championship titles. His best game was a 45-point performance against Whitney Young Magnet High School during his senior season. In 2009, ESPN named Collins to the Illinois Prep All-Decade Team.

College recruiting
Name	Hometown	School	Height	Weight	Commit date
Sherron Collins; Point guard	Chicago, Illinois	Crane (IL)	5 ft 11 in (1.80 m)	180 lb (82 kg)	Oct 16, 2005
Sherron Collins; Point guard	Recruit ratings: Scout: Rivals:				
Overall recruit ranking: Scout: 12, 2 (PG) Rivals: 21, 4 (PG)
Note: In many cases, Scout, Rivals, 247Sports, On3, and ESPN may conflict in their listings of height and weight.; In these cases, the average was taken. ESPN grades are on a 100-point scale.; Sources: "Kansas Basketball Commitments". Rivals.; "2006 Kansas Basketball Commits". Scout.; "ESPN". ESPN.; "Scout.com Team Recruiting Rankings". Scout.; "2006 Team Ranking". Rivals.

== College career ==
=== Freshman season ===
As a freshman, Collins was an honorable mention All-Big 12 selection and a unanimous selection to the Big 12 All-Rookie team. He averaged 22.3 minutes and 9.3 points per game. He led Kansas in scoring five times and in assists on 12 occasions. On January 15, 2007, Collins scored 23 points vs. Missouri. He scored 20 points at Kansas State on February 19 and he had 20 vs. Texas on March 11 in the 88–84 overtime 2007 Big 12 men's basketball tournament championship game victory. Collins was also a solid student earning Athletic Director's and Big 12 Commissioner's honor rolls in the spring of 2007.

=== Sophomore season ===
In his second season with the Jayhawks, Collins won the 2008 Big 12 Sixth Man Award. For the week of March 12, he earned Big 12 Player of the week. Collins helped the Jayhawks capture the 2008 national championship, averaging 8.3 points and 3.8 assists in the NCAA tournament. He made two key plays in the title game versus the Memphis Tigers, first stealing an inbound pass with under two minutes remaining in regulation and Kansas trailing by seven, then hitting a three to cut the deficit to four. Later, with seconds remaining in regulation and with Kansas trailing by three, he took the ball down the court following a Memphis free throw, barely escaping fouls, and passed the ball to teammate Mario Chalmers, who made a three-pointer to tie the game with two seconds remaining. Kansas would go on to win in overtime. He missed six games due to a stress fracture of his foot. Following the season, he had arthroscopic surgery on his left knee.

=== Junior season ===
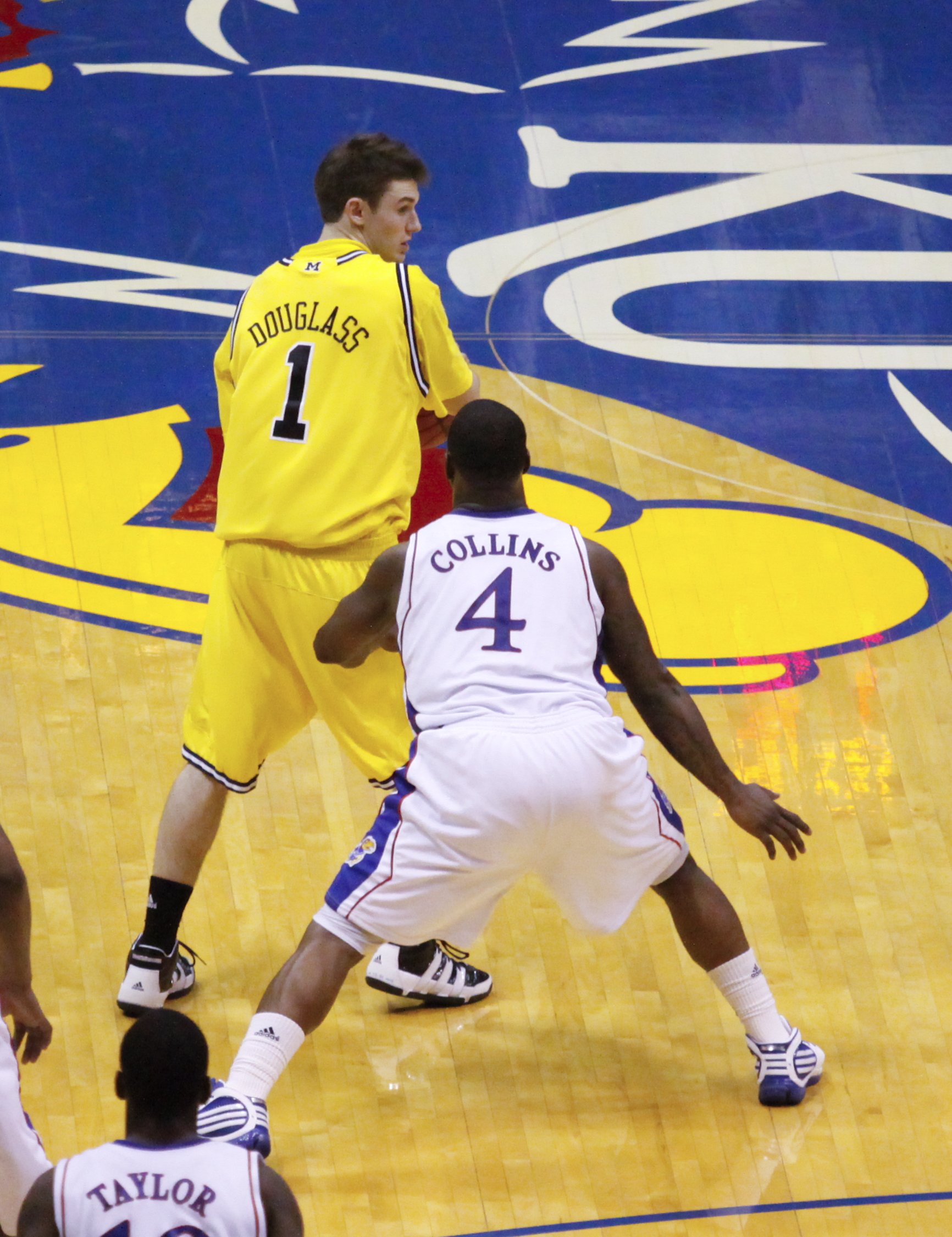
Collins guards Stu Douglass of Michigan.

Collins was the top returning scorer for the 2008–09 Kansas Jayhawks men's basketball team his junior year; every starter from the previous year's National Championship team graduated or departed for the NBA. Collins was on the early season Top 50 watchlist for the Naismith Award. He was also selected as being among the 17 Bob Cousy Award finalists, the Top 30 midseason Wooden Award candidates, the Top 30 midseason Naismith Award candidates and the Top 15 Oscar Robertson Trophy candidates. The team captain and vocal leader of the team, Collins was awarded the team's Danny Manning MVP award with Cole Aldrich following the season. Collins led the 2008–09 Jayhawks in points, minutes, assists and free-throw percentage. He led the team in scoring in 27 games, including the final 10 of the season. In the Big 12, he ranked third in scoring and fourth in assists. Collins made 35 consecutive free-throws over an eight-game span from January 10 – February 2 to set KU's all-time record. Over the course of the season he was named Big 12 Player of the Week three times. He was a unanimous selection to the 2008–09 Big 12 All-conference first team. He was a second-team 2009 NCAA Men's Basketball All-American by the United States Basketball Writers Association (USBW) and the National Association of Basketball Coaches (NABC) and was a third-team All America selection by the Associated Press and The Sporting News. On Monday, April 13, Collins announced that he would return to KU for his senior season.

=== Senior season ===
After having been named a consensus second-team All-American selection at the end of his junior year, he was a unanimous selection to the preseason All-Big 12 first-team. The 2009-10 Kansas Jayhawks men's basketball team were the preseason number-one ranked team in the 2009–10 Big 12 Conference poll, marking the third time in Collins' career the Jayhawks were preseason number one in conference. Collins was a preseason top 50 watchlist candidate for both the 2010 Naismith Award and the 2010 Wooden Award. As the season progressed, Collins was named to the Midseason top 30 candidates list for the Wooden Award, Midseason top 30 list for the Naismith Trophy, 20 finalists list for the 2010 Bob Cousy Award and the finalist list for the 2010 Oscar Robertson Trophy. At the end of the regular season, he was selected as a first-team All-Big 12 member by the league's coaches. Then, he earned the Most Outstanding Player Award of the 2010 Big 12 men's basketball tournament after leading Kansas to the championship. Collins has been recognized as a first team 2010 NCAA Men's Basketball All-American by the USBW and NABC, making him a consensus first team selection. He was a second team selection by Associated Press, Fox Sports, The Sporting News, and Yahoo! Sports. He was also included on the final 26-man ballot for the Wooden Award and subsequently selected to the ten-man Wooden All-American team as one of ten finalists for the award. At the end of the year he was recognized as the inaugural recipient of the Lute Olsen Award as National Player of the Year at the collegeinsider.com awards banquet. He was recognized along with Jon Scheyer, Scottie Reynolds, and Greivis Vasquez for the NABC Career Achievement Awards. Collins was awarded the 2010 Frances Pomeroy Naismith Award, which recognizes a seniors male basketball player 6 feet (1.8 m) and shorter, who excel in both academics and athletics. He was one of five finalists flown out to Los Angeles for the announcement of the Wooden Award along with eventual winner Evan Turner, John Wall, Wesley Johnson and Da'Sean Butler. Collins went undrafted in the 2010 NBA draft.

=== College stats ===
Year	Games Played	Minutes	PPG	Assists	Turnovers	Steals	3 PM	3 PA	3 P %	FG %	FT %	Points
2006–07	38	22.3	9.3	112	63	28	47	116	.405%	.478%	.766%	345
2007–08	34	23.8	9.3	105	68	39	38	105	.362%	.462%	.776%	315
2008–09	35	35.1	18.9	174	115	39	77	205	.376%	.434%	.795%	661
2009–10	36	33.0	15.5	161	85	39	70	189	.370%	.426%	.855%	558
Total	143	28.5	13.3	552	331	145	232	615	.378%	.450%	.798%	1,879

== Professional career ==
After going undrafted in the 2010 NBA draft, Collins joined the Charlotte Bobcats for the 2010 NBA Summer League. During the Orlando Summer League, he played four games, including a 32-point performance in his finale. On August 6, 2010, the Bobcats signed Collins to a two-year deal. He made his NBA debut on November 3, 2010, against the New Jersey Nets and posted two assists in four minutes. On December 4, 2010, he scored his first NBA points. On December 8, 2010, Collins was assigned to the Maine Red Claws of the NBA Development League. The Bobcats recalled Collins on December 21, 2010. That night, he played a career-high 14 minutes, made his first three point shot, recorded his first two steals and scored five points for the first time in his career in a 99–81 loss to the Oklahoma City Thunder.

On February 24, 2011, Collins was waived by the Bobcats to create roster room following a trade between the Bobcats and Portland Trail Blazers. On March 18, 2011, it was reported that he had signed a contract with Lietuvos Rytas until the end of the season. However, a few days later, another player was reported to be the choice to fill the roster slot. In June, he signed with Quebradillas Pirates of the Baloncesto Superior Nacional, but he supposedly failed a physical and returned to the United States before appearing in a game for them.

In August 2011, Collins signed with Hacettepe Universitesi of the Turkish Basketball League. He had been slated to play in Russia and Puerto Rico before signing in Turkey. In June 2012, he was rehabilitating a knee injury with hopes of signing an NBA Summer League contract the following month.

On October 1, 2012, Collins signed with the San Antonio Spurs. However, he was later waived by the Spurs on October 5, 2012.

On April 3, 2014, Collins was acquired by the Texas Legends of the NBA Development League, where he spent the rest of the 2013–14 season. However, he did not appear in a game for the Legends.

On October 31, 2015, Collins returned to the Legends. He played in two games for the team before being waived on November 20.

On January 21, 2016, Collins signed a contract to play with the Chicago Blues of the Midwest Professional Basketball Association. In March, he signed with the Windsor Express of the National Basketball League of Canada with no indication that he ever played for the Blues.

On November 10, 2017, he was announced as part of the inaugural roster for the Kansas City Tornados of the North American Premier Basketball league. However, the team opened its season without Collins.

On February 19, 2018, his Jayhawks number four jersey was retired in the rafters of Allen Fieldhouse during halftime of the Kansas and Oklahoma Men's Basketball game. This came two days after Cole Aldrich had his jersey retired by Kansas.

=== NBA statistics ===
Year	Team	GP	GS	MPG	FG%	3P%	FT%	RPG	APG	SPG	BPG	PPG
2010–11	Charlotte	20	0	3.3	.280	.200	1.000	.3	.4	.1	.0	.9
Career		20	0	3.3	.280	.200	1.000	.3	.4	.1	.0	.9

== See also ==
- 2006 high school boys basketball All-Americans
- 2009 NCAA Men's Basketball All-Americans
- 2010 NCAA Men's Basketball All-Americans
