= Andrew Fitzgerald (basketball) =

American basketball player

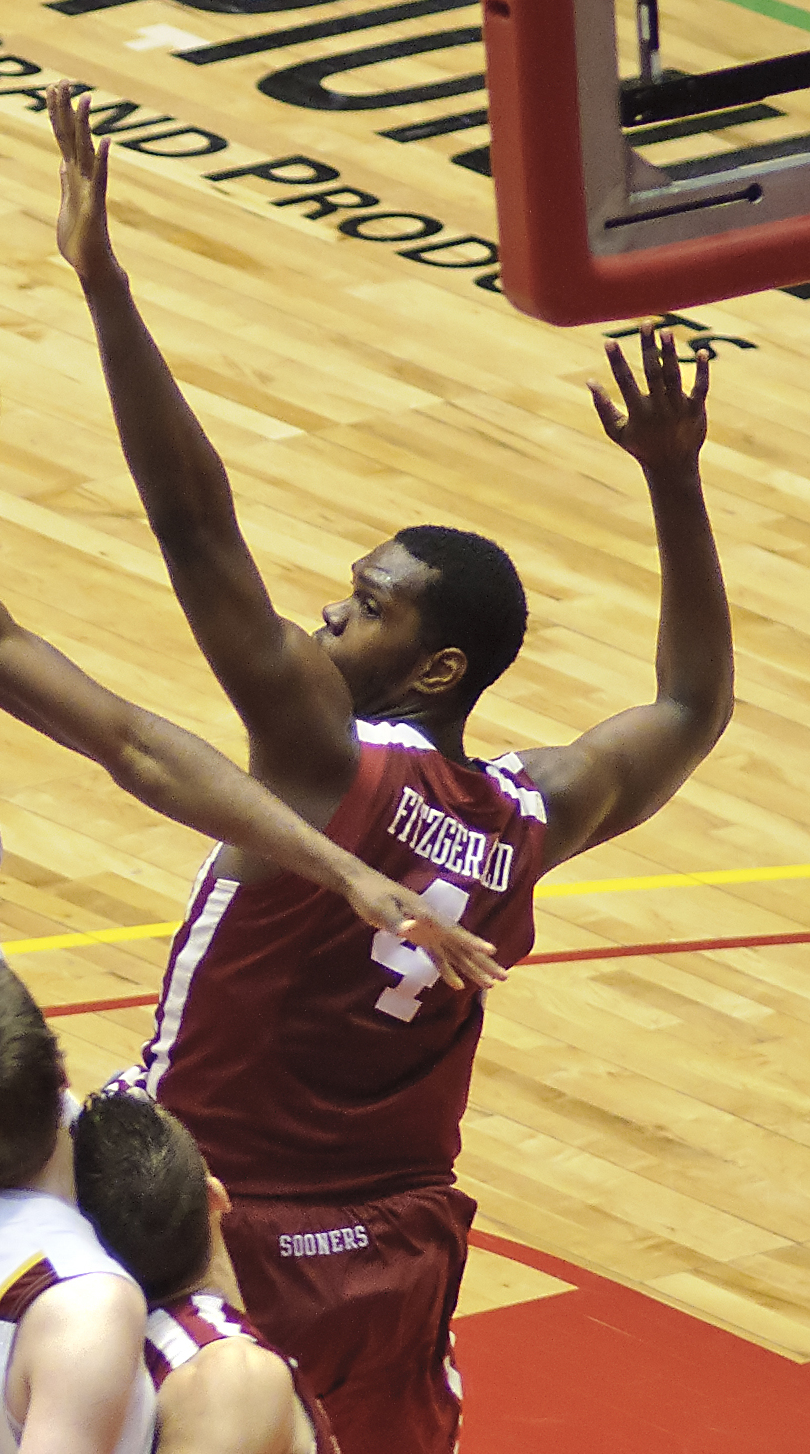
- Fitzgerald playing for Oklahoma

No. 12 – Tachikawa Dice
- Position: Power forward
- League: B.League

Personal information
- Born: December 10, 1990 (age 35) Baltimore, Maryland
- Listed height: 6 ft 8 in (2.03 m)
- Listed weight: 238 lb (108 kg)

Career information
- High school: Brewster Academy (Wolfeboro, New Hampshire)
- College: Oklahoma (2009–2013)
- NBA draft: 2013: undrafted
- Playing career: 2013–present

Career history
- 2013–2014: ASK KS Siarka Tarnobrzeg
- 2014–2015: Poitiers Basket 86
- 2015–2018: Kanazawa Samuraiz
- 2018–2019: Ehime Orange Vikings
- 2019–2020: Bambitious Nara
- 2020-2021: Toyotsu Fighting Eagles Nagoya
- 2021-2023: Ehime Orange Vikings
- 2023-present: Tachikawa Dice

Career highlights
- bj League 6th Man (2016)

Andrew Fitzgerald (born December 10, 1990) is an American professional basketball player for Tachikawa Dice in Japan. He played college basketball for Oklahoma University.

== Career statistics ==
Legend
GP	Games played	GS	Games started	MPG	Minutes per game
FG%	Field goal percentage	3P%	3-point field goal percentage	FT%	Free throw percentage
RPG	Rebounds per game	APG	Assists per game	SPG	Steals per game
BPG	Blocks per game	PPG	Points per game	**Bold**	Career high

Year	Team	GP	GS	MPG	FG%	3P%	FT%	RPG	APG	SPG	BPG	PPG
2015–16	Kanazawa	50	4	23.1	.526	.200	.773	6.6	1.0	.6	.2	16.3
2016–17	Kanazawa	50		21.2	.558	.000	.784	7.3	1.2	.6	.4	16.2
2017–18	Kanazawa	60	60	28.1	.553	.000	.722	8.8	2.1	.8	.4	20.4
