= Polynice =

Polynice is a surname. Notable people with the surname include:

- Eniel Polynice (born 1988), American basketball player
- Olden Polynice (born 1964), Haitian basketball player

Dieunika Polynice (born 2000), Haitian-Canadian Author
