= 2008–09 Tennessee Volunteers basketball team =

American college basketball season

2008–09 Tennessee Volunteers men's basketball

SEC East Division champions

NCAA tournament, Round of 64
- Conference: Southeastern Conference
- East
- Record: 21–13 (10–6 SEC)
- Head coach: Bruce Pearl (4th season)
- Assistant coaches: Tony Jones; Steve Forbes; Jason Shay
- Home arena: Thompson-Boling Arena

2008–09 Southeastern Conference men's basketball standings
	Conf.				Overall
Team	W		L	PCT	W		L	PCT
East
South Carolina	10	–	6	.625	21	–	10	.677
Tennessee	10	–	6	.625	21	–	13	.618
Florida	9	–	7	.563	25	–	11	.694
Vanderbilt	8	–	8	.500	19	–	12	.613
Kentucky	8	–	8	.500	22	–	14	.611
Georgia	3	–	13	.188	12	–	20	.375
West
No. 21 LSU	13	–	3	.813	27	–	8	.771
Auburn	10	–	6	.625	24	–	12	.667
Mississippi State†	9	–	7	.563	23	–	13	.639
Alabama	7	–	9	.438	18	–	14	.563
Ole Miss	7	–	9	.438	16	–	15	.516
Arkansas	2	–	14	.125	14	–	16	.467
† SEC Tournament winner Rankings from AP Poll

The 2008–09 Tennessee Volunteers basketball team represented the University of Tennessee in the 2008-09 NCAA Division I men's basketball season. This was the fourth season for Bruce Pearl as the Volunteers' head coach. The team, a member of the Eastern Division of the Southeastern Conference, played its home games at Thompson-Boling Arena.

== Preseason ==
The 2007–08 Volunteers finished the season 31–5 overall with a 14–2 mark in conference play. They won their first outright SEC regular season men's basketball championship in 41 years. In postseason play, the Volunteers earned a No. 2 seed in the NCAA tournament. The team went on to lose in the Sweet Sixteen to the Louisville Cardinals and finished ranked at #7 in the ESPN/USA Today poll.

The Vols lost three seniors from their team during the off-season: Chris Lofton, JaJuan Smith, and Jordan Howell. Also, sophomore forward Duke Crews and sophomore point guard Ramar Smith were dismissed from the team for a combination of "violations of the University of Tennessee’s substance-abuse policy and academic shortcomings."

On November 3, 2008, the SEC released the rosters for the preseason All-SEC first and second teams. Junior forward Tyler Smith was chosen for both SEC Player of the Year and first team All-SEC. Wayne Chism and J. P. Prince were selected for the second team All-SEC, thus tying Tennessee with LSU for the most All-SEC selections (3).

== Recruiting ==
Bruce Pearl was able to pull together a highly ranked recruiting class for the 2008–09 season. The class included: Emmanuel Negedu, rated 13th among power forwards in the Class of 2008 by Rivals.com; Renaldo Woolridge, the 11th ranked small forward; Bobby Maze, a junior college guard averaging 20.7 points, 4.5 rebounds and 6.8 assists per game; and Scotty Hopson, a McDonald's All-American and ranked 5th overall by Rivals.com. The class also includes point guard Daniel West and center Philip Jurick. Rivals.com ranked the class as 7th best in the nation.

== 2008–09 Roster ==
Name	Number	Position	Height	Weight	Year	Hometown	Former School
Renaldo Woolridge	0	G/F	6–8	208	Freshman	North Hollywood, California	Harvard-Westlake
Tyler Smith	1	F	6–7	215	Junior	Pulaski, Tennessee	Iowa
Bobby Maze	3	PG	6–2	185	Junior	Suitland, Maryland	Hutchinson (Kan.) C.C.
Wayne Chism	4	F/C	6–9	242	Junior	Jackson, Tennessee	Bolivar Central
Emmanuel Negedu	5	PF	6–7	240	Freshman	Kaduna, Nigeria	Brewster (N.H.) Academy
Quinn Cannington	11	SG	6–4	165	Junior	Knoxville, Tennessee	Fulton
Steven Pearl	22	SF	6–5	228	Sophomore	Knoxville, Tennessee	West
Cameron Tatum	23	G/F	6–6	196	Redshirt freshman	Lithonia, Georgia	The Patterson School
Tanner Wild	24	PG	6–0	170	Senior	Huntington, West Virginia	Huntington
Josh Tabb	25	PG	6–4	196	Junior	Carbondale, Illinois	Harmony Community Prep
J. P. Prince	30	SG	6–7	205	Junior	Memphis, Tennessee	Arizona
Scotty Hopson	32	SG	6–7	185	Freshman	Hopkinsville, Kentucky	University Heights
Brian Williams	33	C	6–10	267	Sophomore	Bronx, New York	Harmony Community Prep
Ryan Childress	34	PF	6–9	235	Senior	Cincinnati, Ohio	Moeller
Phillip Jurick	44	C	6–10	250	Freshman	Chattanooga, Tennessee	East Ridge

== Schedule and results ==
Date time, TV	Rank^{#}	Opponent^{#}	Result	Record	Site (attendance) city, state
November 3*; 7:00 pm	No. 14	Indianapolis	W 87-73		Thompson-Boling Arena (18,378); Knoxville, TN
November 7*; 7:30 pm	No. 14	Tusculum	W 82-51		Thompson-Boling Arena (20,421); Knoxville, TN
Regular season
November 15*; 7:00 pm, SportSouth	No. 14	Chattanooga	W 114-75	1–0	Thompson-Boling Arena (21,864); Knoxville, TN
November 18*; 7:00 pm, SportSouth	No. 14	UT-Martin	W 91-64	2–0	Thompson-Boling Arena (19,761); Knoxville, TN
November 21*; 8:30 pm, CSS	No. 14	at MTSU	W 76–66	3–0	Murphy Center (11,802); Murfreesboro, TN
November 27*; 12:00 pm, ESPN2	No. 12	vs. Siena; Old Spice Classic	W 78–64	4–0	The Milk House (3,357); Lake Buena Vista, FL
November 28*; 1:00 pm, ESPN2	No. 12	vs. No. 16 Georgetown; Old Spice Classic	W 90–78	5–0	The Milk House (3,926); Lake Buena Vista, FL
November 30*; 7:30 pm, ESPN2	No. 12	vs. No. 10 Gonzaga; Old Spice Classic	L 74–83	5–1	The Milk House (3,914); Lake Buena Vista, FL
December 3*; 7:00 pm, SportSouth	No. 10	UNC-Asheville	W 87-69	6–1	Thompson-Boling Arena (19,391); Knoxville, TN
December 13*; 12:00 pm, ESPN	No. 8	at Temple	L 72–88	6–2	Liacouras Center (8,068); Philadelphia, PA
December 16*; 9:30 pm, ESPN	No. 16	vs. No. 23 Marquette	W 80-68	7–2	Sommet Center (9,498); Nashville, TN
December 20*; 3:00 pm, SportSouth	No. 16	Belmont	W 79-77	8–2	Thompson-Boling Arena (21,314); Knoxville, TN
December 29*; 7:30 pm	No. 14	Louisiana-Lafayette	W 89-62	9–2	Thompson-Boling Arena (21,863); Knoxville, TN
January 3*; 2:00 pm, ESPN	No. 14	at Kansas	L 85–92	9–3	Allen Fieldhouse (16,300); Lawrence, KS
January 7*; 9:00 pm, ESPN2	No. 15	Gonzaga	L 79–89 ^{OT}	9–4	Thompson-Boling Arena (22,326); Knoxville, TN
January 10; 12:00 pm, Raycom	No. 15	at Georgia	W 86–77	10–4	Stegeman Coliseum (8,769); Athens, GA
January 13; 9:00 pm, ESPN	No. 24	Kentucky	L 72-90	10–5	Thompson-Boling Arena (20,474); Knoxville, TN
January 17; 6:00 pm, FSN	No. 24	South Carolina	W 82–79	11–5	Thompson-Boling Arena (20,203); Knoxville, TN
January 20; 9:00 pm, ESPN		at Vanderbilt	W 76–63	12–5	Memorial Gymnasium (14,057); Nashville, TN
January 24*; 3:30 pm, CBS		Memphis	L 52-54	12–6	Thompson-Boling Arena (21,905); Knoxville, TN
January 28; 8:00 pm, Raycom		LSU	L 73–79	12–7	Thompson-Boling Arena (18,526); Knoxville, TN
January 31; 9:00 pm, ESPN		Florida; ESPN College GameDay	W 79-63	13–7	Thompson-Boling Arena (20,984); Knoxville, TN
February 4; 8:00 pm, Raycom		at Arkansas	W 72–70	14–7	Bud Walton Arena (16,064); Fayetteville, AR
February 7; 1:00 pm, Raycom		at Auburn	L 77–78	14–8	Beard-Eaves-Memorial Coliseum (6,321); Auburn, AL
February 11; 8:00 pm, Raycom		Georgia	W 79-48	15–8	Thompson-Boling Arena (18,623); Knoxville, TN
February 14; 3:00 pm, Raycom		Vanderbilt	W 69–50	16–8	Thompson-Boling Arena (20,375); Knoxville, TN
February 18; 8:00 pm, Raycom		at Mississippi	L 65–81	16–9	Tad Smith Coliseum (7,250); Oxford, MS
February 21; 1:00 pm, CBS		at Kentucky	L 58–77	16–10	Rupp Arena (24,394); Lexington, KY
February 25; 9:00 pm, Raycom		Mississippi State	W 81–76	17–10	Thompson-Boling Arena (19,137); Knoxville, TN
March 1; 2:00 pm, CBS		at Florida	W 79–75	18–10	O'Connell Center (12,490); Gainesville, FL
March 5; 7:00 pm, ESPN		at South Carolina	W 87–70	19–10	Colonial Life Arena (18,000); Columbia, SC
March 8; 12:00 pm, CBS		Alabama	L 67–70	19–11	Thompson-Boling Arena (20,493); Knoxville, TN
SEC Tournament
March 13; 7:30 pm, Raycom		vs. Alabama; SEC Quarterfinals	W 86–62	20–11	St. Pete Times Forum (14,128); Tampa, FL
March 14; 3:15 pm, Raycom		vs. Auburn; SEC Semifinals	W 94–85	21–11	St. Pete Times Forum (10,387); Tampa, FL
March 15; 1:00 pm, CBS		vs. Mississippi State; SEC Championship Game	L 61–64	21–12	St. Pete Times Forum (10,093); Tampa, FL
NCAA Tournament
March 20; 12:25 pm, CBS	(9 E)	vs. (8 E) Oklahoma State; 1st Round NCAA Tournament	L 75–77	21–13	University of Dayton Arena (12,499); Dayton, OH
*Non-conference game. ^{#}Rankings from AP Poll. (#) Tournament seedings in parentheses. All times are in Eastern Time.

== Rankings ==
Ranking movements Legend: ██ Increase in ranking ██ Decrease in ranking — = Not ranked т = Tied with team above or below
	Week																			
Poll	Pre	1	2	3	4	5	6	7	8	9	10	11	12	13	14	15	16	17	18	Final
AP	14	14	12	10	8	16	16	14	15	24	—									Not released
Coaches	13	13	12	13	8	19	21	18 т	25	—										
