= 2008–09 Ole Miss Rebels men's basketball team =

American college basketball season

2008–09 Ole Miss Rebels men's basketball
- Conference: Southeastern Conference
- West
- Record: 16–15 (7–9 SEC)
- Head coach: Andy Kennedy
- Assistant coaches: Mike White; Owen Miller; Torrey Ward
- Home arena: Tad Smith Coliseum

2008–09 Southeastern Conference men's basketball standings
	Conf.				Overall
Team	W		L	PCT	W		L	PCT
East
South Carolina	10	–	6	.625	21	–	10	.677
Tennessee	10	–	6	.625	21	–	13	.618
Florida	9	–	7	.563	25	–	11	.694
Vanderbilt	8	–	8	.500	19	–	12	.613
Kentucky	8	–	8	.500	22	–	14	.611
Georgia	3	–	13	.188	12	–	20	.375
West
No. 21 LSU	13	–	3	.813	27	–	8	.771
Auburn	10	–	6	.625	24	–	12	.667
Mississippi State†	9	–	7	.563	23	–	13	.639
Alabama	7	–	9	.438	18	–	14	.563
Ole Miss	7	–	9	.438	16	–	15	.516
Arkansas	2	–	14	.125	14	–	16	.467
† SEC Tournament winner Rankings from AP Poll

The 2008–09 Ole Miss Rebels men's basketball team represented the University of Mississippi in the 2008–09 college basketball season. This was head coach Andy Kennedy's third season at Ole Miss. The Rebels competed in the Southeastern Conference and played their home games at Tad Smith Coliseum. They finished the season with a record of 16–15, 7–9 in SEC play and did not qualify for any postseason tournaments.

== Roster ==
#	Name	Height	Weight (lbs.)	Position	Class	Hometown
3	Will Bogan	6'1"	175	G	Fr.	Boise, ID, U.S.
25	Ryan Brown	6'2"	208	G	Jr.	Texarkana, TX, U.S.
34	Kevin Cantinol	6'10"	254	C	Fr.	Guadeloupe
52	Deaundre Cranston	6'9"	196	F	Fr.	Orlando, FL, U.S.
32	Zach Graham	6'6"	218	G	So.	Suwanee, GA, U.S.
1	Terrance Henry	6'9"	210	F	Fr.	Monroe, LA, U.S.
31	Murphy Holloway	6'7"	240	F	So.	Irmo, SC, U.S.
33	David Huertas	6'5"	200	G	Jr.	Humacao, Puerto Rico
14	Eniel Polynice	6'5"	220	G	Jr.	Sarasota, FL, U.S.
22	Patrick Spach	6'1"	165	G	Sr.	Memphis, TN, U.S.
12	Chris Warren	5'10"	168	G	So.	Orlando, FL, U.S.
5	Malcolm White	6'9"	220	F	So.	Baton Rouge, LA, U.S.
24	Terrico White	6'5"	213	G	Fr.	Memphis, TN, U.S.

== Rankings ==
Ranking movement Legend: ██ Improvement in ranking. ██ Decrease in ranking. ██ Not ranked the previous week. RV=Others receiving votes.
Poll	Pre	Wk 1	Wk 2	Wk 3	Wk 4	Wk 5	Wk 6	Wk 7	Wk 8	Wk 9	Wk 10	Wk 11	Wk 12	Wk 13	Wk 14	Wk 15	Wk 16	WK 17	Wk 18	Final
AP	--	--	--	--	--	--	--	--	--	--	--	--	--	--	--	--	--	--	--	
Coaches	--	--	--	--	--	--	--	--	--	--	--	--	--	--	--	--	--	--	--	

== Schedule and results ==
Date time, TV	Rank^{#}	Opponent^{#}	Result	Record	Site (attendance) city, state
Regular Season
11/14/2008		Arkansas State	W 65–52	1–0	Tad Smith Coliseum; Oxford, MS
11/18/2008*		South Alabama	W 89–71	2–0	Tad Smith Coliseum; Oxford, MS
11/21/2008*		at Utah	L 72–83	2–1	Jon M. Huntsman Center; Salt Lake City, UT
11/23/2008*; 4:00pm		Marshall	W 82–78	3–1	Tad Smith Coliseum; Oxford, MS
11/26/2008*		UCF	W 78–46	4–1	Tad Smith Coliseum; Oxford, MS
11/29/2008*		Morgan State	W 78–70	5–1	Tad Smith Coliseum; Oxford, MS
12/3/2008*		West Virginia	L 78–80	5–2	Tad Smith Coliseum; Oxford, MS
12/6/2008*		at New Orleans	W 78–65	6–2	Lakefront Arena; New Orleans, LA
12/13/2008*; 12:00pm, FSN		at New Mexico	L 70–103	6–3	The Pit; Albuquerque, NM
12/15/2008*		Alabama State	W 85–81	7–3	Tad Smith Coliseum; Oxford, MS
12/18/2008*		at No. 9 Louisville	L 68–77	7–4	KFC Yum! Center; Louisville, KY
12/22/2008*		Florida A&M	W 86–63	8–4	Tad Smith Coliseum; Oxford, MS
12/30/2008*		at Southern Miss	L 59–78	8–5	Reed Green Coliseum; Hattiesburg, MS
1/3/2009*		Nicholls State	W 53–41	9–5	Tad Smith Coliseum; Oxford, MS
1/10/2009		at Florida	L 68–78	9–6 (0–1)	O'Connell Center; Gainesville, FL
1/14/2009		Arkansas	W 74–65	10–6 (1–1)	Tad Smith Coliseum; Oxford, MS
1/17/2009; Ray/Com		LSU	L 51–83	10–7 (1–2)	Tad Smith Coliseum; Oxford, MS
1/21/2009; SEC Network		at Alabama	L 73–76	10–8 (1–3)	Coleman Coliseum; Tuscaloosa, AL
1/24/2009; Fox Sports Network		at South Carolina	L 71–82	10–9 (1–4)	Colonial Life Arena; Columbia, SC
1/27/2009; ESPN		No. 24 Kentucky	W 85–80	11–9 (2–4)	Tad Smith Coliseum; Oxford, MS
1/31/2009; Ray/Com		at Mississippi State	W 67–63	12–9 (3–4)	Humphrey Coliseum; Starkville, MS
1/31/2009; 6:00pm		Auburn	W 78–59	13–9 (4–4)	Tad Smith Coliseum; Oxford, MS
2/7/2009; CBS		at Vanderbilt	L 61–71	13–10 (4–5)	Memorial Gymnasium; Nashville, TN
2/6/2010; 5:00pm		at LSU	L 66–73	13–11 (4–6)	Pete Maravich Assembly Center; Baton Rouge, LA
2/18/2009; Ray/Com		Tennessee	W 81–65	14–11 (5–6)	Tad Smith Coliseum; Oxford, MS
2/21/2009; Fox Sports Network		Georgia	W 69–47	15–11 (6–6)	Tad Smith Coliseum; Oxford, MS
2/25/2009		at Auburn	L 64–77	15–12 (6–7)	Auburn Arena; Auburn, AL
2/28/2009; Ray/Com		Alabama	L 69–90	15–13 (6–8)	Tad Smith Coliseum; Oxford, MS
2/28/2009		at Arkansas	W 98–91 ^{OT}	16–13 (7–8)	Bud Walton Arena; Fayetteville, AR
3/4/2010		Mississippi State	L 80–82	16–14 (7–9)	Tad Smith Coliseum; Oxford, MS
SEC tournament
3/12/2009; Sec Network	No. (5)	No. (4) Kentucky; First Round	L 58–71	16–15 (7–10)	Amalie Arena; Tampa Bay, FL
