= 2008–09 South Carolina Gamecocks men's basketball team =

American college basketball season

2008–09 South Carolina Gamecocks men's basketball

SEC East Division champion

NIT First Round vs. Davidson, L 63-70
- Conference: Southeastern Conference
- East
- Record: 21–10 (10–6 SEC)
- Head coach: Darrin Horn (1st season)
- Assistant coaches: Michael Boynton; Cypheus Bunton; Scott Cherry
- Home arena: Colonial Life Arena

2008–09 Southeastern Conference men's basketball standings
	Conf.				Overall
Team	W		L	PCT	W		L	PCT
East
South Carolina	10	–	6	.625	21	–	10	.677
Tennessee	10	–	6	.625	21	–	13	.618
Florida	9	–	7	.563	25	–	11	.694
Vanderbilt	8	–	8	.500	19	–	12	.613
Kentucky	8	–	8	.500	22	–	14	.611
Georgia	3	–	13	.188	12	–	20	.375
West
No. 21 LSU	13	–	3	.813	27	–	8	.771
Auburn	10	–	6	.625	24	–	12	.667
Mississippi State†	9	–	7	.563	23	–	13	.639
Alabama	7	–	9	.438	18	–	14	.563
Ole Miss	7	–	9	.438	16	–	15	.516
Arkansas	2	–	14	.125	14	–	16	.467
† SEC Tournament winner Rankings from AP Poll

The 2008–09 South Carolina men's basketball team represented University of South Carolina. The head coach was Darrin Horn, who was in his first season with the Gamecocks. The team played its home games in the 18,000-seat Colonial Life Arena in Columbia, South Carolina. The Gamecocks won the SEC Eastern Division Championship.

== Regular season ==
On November 14, 2008, Carolina defeated the Jacksonville State Gamecocks 89–76 to win the first game of the Darrin Horn Era at USC.

On December 2, 2008, Carolina defeated Princeton 84–58, handing the Tigers their worst defeat in Jadwin Gym since it opened in 1969.

On January 2, 2009, Carolina defeated #19 Baylor, 85–84.

On January 21, 2009, Carolina defeated #24 Florida, 70–69.

On January 31, 2009, Carolina defeated #24 Kentucky, 78–77, the Gamecocks' second win in history at Rupp Arena.

On February 25, 2009, Carolina defeated Kentucky 77–59, setting a school-record for blocked shots with 16, and sweeping the season series with the Wildcats for only the second time (1997) since joining the SEC.

== Roster ==
No.	Name	Ht.	Wt.	Position	Year	Hometown
21	Dominique Archie	6'7"	200	F	JR	Augusta, Georgia, United States
31	Evaldas Baniulis	6'7"	210	F	JR	Vilnius, Lithuania
55	Mitchell Carter	6'10"	260	C	JR	Milwaukee, Wisconsin, United States
12	Branden Conrad	6'2"	180	G	SR	Charlotte, North Carolina, United States
2	Devan Downey	5'9"	175	G	JR	Chester, South Carolina, United States
20	Zam Fredrick	6'0"	203	G	SR	St. Matthews, South Carolina, United States
24	Mike Holmes	6'7"	230	F/C	SO	Bishopville, South Carolina, United States
44	Sam Muldrow	6'9"	216	F	SO	Florence, South Carolina, United States
5	Brandis Raley-Ross	6'2"	193	G	JR	Gastonia, North Carolina, United States
25	Austin Steed	6'8"	215	F	SO	Hephzibah, Georgia, United States
14	Robert Wilder	6'1"	185	G	JR	Chapin, South Carolina, United States

=== 2009 Commitments ===
College recruiting information
Name	Hometown	School	Height	Weight	Commit date
Ramon Galloway; PG	Palm Beach Gardens, FL	William T. Dwyer HS	6 ft 2 in (1.88 m)	175 lb (79 kg)	Sep 13, 2008
Ramon Galloway; PG	Recruit ratings: Scout: Rivals: (89)				
Lakeem Jackson; SF	Arden, NC	Christ School	6 ft 5 in (1.96 m)	215 lb (98 kg)	Jul 16, 2008
Lakeem Jackson; SF	Recruit ratings: Scout: Rivals: (91)				
Johndre Jefferson; PF	Niceville, FL	Northwest Florida State College	6 ft 9 in (2.06 m)	210 lb (95 kg)	Mar 5, 2009
Johndre Jefferson; PF	Recruit ratings: Scout: Rivals:				
Steve Spinella; SG	Pennsauken, NJ	Apex Academy	6 ft 5 in (1.96 m)	180 lb (82 kg)	Jan 23, 2009
Steve Spinella; SG	Recruit ratings: Scout: Rivals: (86)				
Overall recruit ranking:
Note: In many cases, Scout, Rivals, 247Sports, On3, and ESPN may conflict in their listings of height and weight.; In these cases, the average was taken. ESPN grades are on a 100-point scale.; Sources: "South Carolina Basketball Commitments". Rivals.; "2009 South Carolina Basketball Commits". Scout.; "ESPN". ESPN.; "Scout.com Team Recruiting Rankings". Scout.; "2009 Team Ranking". Rivals.

== Schedule and results ==
Date time, TV	Rank^{#}	Opponent^{#}	Result	Record	Site (attendance) city, state
Fri, Nov. 7*; 7:00pm		Kentucky Wesleyan; Exhibition	W 75–55		Colonial Life Arena (3,053); Columbia, SC
Regular season
Fri, Nov. 14*; 7:00pm, SportsSouth		Jacksonville State	W 89–76	1–0	Colonial Life Arena (11,439); Columbia, SC
Sun, Nov. 16*; 4:00pm, SportsSouth		Winthrop	W 86–63	2–0	Colonial Life Arena (7,231); Columbia, SC
Sat, Nov. 22*; 1:00pm, SportsSouth		USC Upstate	W 75–53	3–0	Colonial Life Arena (5,573); Columbia, SC
Tue, Nov. 25*; 7:00pm, SportsSouth		Gardner-Webb	W 85–70	4–0	Colonial Life Arena (9,545); Columbia, SC
Fri, Nov. 28*; 7:00pm, CSS		at College of Charleston	L 80–82 ^{OT}	4–1	Carolina First Arena (5,032); Charleston, SC
Tue, Dec. 2*; 7:00pm		at Princeton	W 84–58	5–1	Jadwin Gymnasium (1,984); Princeton, NJ
Fri, Dec. 5*; 6:00pm		Furman	W 72–48	6–1	Colonial Life Arena (9,031); Columbia, SC
Tue, Dec. 16*; 8:00pm, SportsSouth		North Carolina Central	W 90–43	7–1	Colonial Life Arena (9,065); Columbia, SC
Sat, Dec. 20*; 5:00pm, SportsSouth		The Citadel	W 80–66	8–1	Colonial Life Arena (9,493); Columbia, SC
Tue, Dec. 23*; 7:00pm, SportsSouth		Presbyterian	W 75–56	9–1	Colonial Life Arena (9,404); Columbia, SC
Tue, Dec. 30*; 7:00pm, FSN		No. 16 Clemson; Carolina-Clemson Rivalry	L 87–98	9–2	Colonial Life Arena (16,168); Columbia, SC
Fri, Jan. 2*; 5:30pm, FSN		at No. 19 Baylor	W 85–84	10–2	Ferrell Center (6,149); Waco, TX
Tue, Dec. 30*; 7:00pm, SportsSouth		Wofford	W 78–61	11–2	Colonial Life Arena (9,165); Columbia, SC
Sat, Jan. 10; 7:00pm		Auburn	W 68–56	12–2 (1–0)	Colonial Life Arena (11,725); Columbia, SC
Wed, Jan. 14; 8:00pm, CST		at LSU	L 68–85	12–3 (1–1)	Pete Maravich Assembly Center (11,393); Baton Rouge, LA
Sat, Jan. 17; 6:00pm, FSN		at Tennessee	L 79–82	12–4 (1–2)	Thompson-Boling Arena (20,203); Knoxville, TN
Wed, Jan. 21; 7:00pm, Raycom		No. 24 Florida	W 70–69	13–4 (2–2)	Colonial Life Arena (12,825); Columbia, SC
Sat, Jan. 24; 8:00pm, FSN		Mississippi	W 82–71	14–4 (3–2)	Colonial Life Arena (14,527); Columbia, SC
Wed, Jan. 28; 7:00pm		Vanderbilt	W 86–76	15–4 (4–2)	Colonial Life Arena (12,766); Columbia, SC
Sat, Jan. 31; 3:00pm, Raycom		at No. 24 Kentucky	W 78–77	16–4 (5–2)	Rupp Arena (24,322); Lexington, KY
Tue, Feb. 3; 9:00pm, ESPN		at Florida	L 93–97	16–5 (5–3)	O'Connell Center (11,152); Gainesville, FL
Sat, Feb. 7; 7:00pm, FSN		Georgia	W 79–68	17–5 (6–3)	Colonial Life Arena (18,000); Columbia, SC
Sat, Feb. 14; 3:00pm, Raycom		at Alabama	W 75–73	18–5 (7–3)	Coleman Coliseum (10,224); Tuscaloosa, AL
Wed, Feb. 18; 8:00pm		at Mississippi State	L 70–75	18–6 (7–4)	Humphrey Coliseum (7,369); Starkville, MS
Sat, Feb. 21; 7:00pm		Arkansas	W 82–78 ^{OT}	19–6 (8–4)	Colonial Life Arena (16,507); Columbia, SC
Wed, Feb. 25; 7:00pm, Raycom		Kentucky	W 77–59	20–6 (9–4)	Colonial Life Arena (16,035); Columbia, SC
Sat, Feb. 28; 9:00pm, ESPNU		at Vanderbilt	L 83–96	20–7 (9–5)	Memorial Gymnasium (13,963); Nashville, TN
Thu, Mar. 5; 7:00pm, ESPN		Tennessee	L 70–86	20–8 (9–6)	Colonial Life Arena (18,000); Columbia, SC
Sat, Mar. 7; 7:00pm, Raycom		at Georgia	W 68–51	21–8 (10–6)	Stegeman Coliseum (7,110); Athens, GA
Postseason
Thu, Mar. 12; 3:15pm, Raycom		vs. Mississippi State; SEC tournament	L 68–82	21–9	St. Pete Times Forum (13,306); Tampa, FL
Tue, Mar. 17*; 7:00pm, ESPN2		Davidson; NIT • First Round	L 63–70	21–10	Colonial Life Arena (7,251); Columbia, SC
*Non-conference game. ^{#}Rankings from Coaches Poll. (#) Tournament seedings in parentheses. All times are in Eastern Time.

== Awards ==
=== SEC Post-Season Awards ===
- Devan Downey – First Team All-SEC, All-Defensive Team
- Dominique Archie – Second Team All-SEC, All-Defensive Team
- Zam Fredrick, Jr. – Second Team All-SEC
- Brandis Raley-Ross – Sixth Man of the Year

=== SEC Pre-Season Awards ===
- Devan Downey – First Team All-SEC
- Dominique Archie – Second Team All-SEC

=== SEC Player of the Week ===
- Devan Downey – February 2, 2009
