= 2008–09 Kentucky Wildcats men's basketball team =

2008–09 season of University of Kentucky men's basketball team

2008–09 Kentucky Wildcats men's basketball

NIT, Quarterfinals
- Conference: Southeastern Conference
- Eastern
- Record: 22–14 (8–8 SEC)
- Head coach: Billy Gillispie (2nd season)
- Assistant coaches: Jeremy Cox; Glynn Cyprien; Tracy Webster
- Home arena: Rupp Arena

2008–09 Southeastern Conference men's basketball standings
	Conf.				Overall
Team	W		L	PCT	W		L	PCT
East
South Carolina	10	–	6	.625	21	–	10	.677
Tennessee	10	–	6	.625	21	–	13	.618
Florida	9	–	7	.563	25	–	11	.694
Vanderbilt	8	–	8	.500	19	–	12	.613
Kentucky	8	–	8	.500	22	–	14	.611
Georgia	3	–	13	.188	12	–	20	.375
West
No. 21 LSU	13	–	3	.813	27	–	8	.771
Auburn	10	–	6	.625	24	–	12	.667
Mississippi State†	9	–	7	.563	23	–	13	.639
Alabama	7	–	9	.438	18	–	14	.563
Ole Miss	7	–	9	.438	16	–	15	.516
Arkansas	2	–	14	.125	14	–	16	.467
† SEC Tournament winner Rankings from AP Poll

The 2008–09 Kentucky Wildcats men's basketball team represented the University of Kentucky in the college basketball season of 2008–09. The team's head coach was Billy Gillispie, who was in his second and final year as coach. The Wildcats played their home games at Rupp Arena in Lexington, Kentucky. The team's season started with a controversial early Midnight Madness event on October 10, 2008, which is not the traditional date for celebration that coincides with the first day of NCAA-sanctioned regular practice sessions that occurred on October 17, 2008.

On March 15, 2009, the Wildcats accepted a bid to the 2009 National Invitation Tournament, ending a streak of 17 consecutive appearances in the NCAA Men's Division I Basketball Championship dating back to 1992.

== Roster ==
2008–09 Kentucky Wildcats men's basketball team
Players
Coaches

Pos.	#	Name	Height	Weight	Year	Previous school	Hometown
F	1	Darius Miller	6 ft 7 in (2.01 m)	223 lb (101 kg)	Fr	Mason County	Maysville, Kentucky
G	2	Matt Scherbenske	6 ft 0 in (1.83 m)	165 lb (75 kg)	Jr	Oak Hill Academy (VA)/Oral Roberts	Lexington, Kentucky
G	3	Kevin Galloway	6 ft 7 in (2.01 m)	215 lb (98 kg)	Jr	Sacramento/Southern Idaho	Sacramento, California
F	5	Ramon Harris	6 ft 7 in (2.01 m)	218 lb (99 kg)	Jr	West Anchorage	Anchorage, Alaska
G	10	Landon Slone	6 ft 3 in (1.91 m)	188 lb (85 kg)	Fr	Paintsville	Paintsville, Kentucky
G	11	Adam Delph	6 ft 1 in (1.85 m)	161 lb (73 kg)	Fr	Pleasure Ridge Park	Louisville, Kentucky
G	12	Mark Krebs	6 ft 5 in (1.96 m)	207 lb (94 kg)	Jr	Newport Central Catholic	Newport, Kentucky
G	13	Michael Porter	6 ft 3 in (1.91 m)	198 lb (90 kg)	Jr	Modesto Christian	Modesto, California
G	14	Mark Halsell	5 ft 11 in (1.8 m)	182 lb (83 kg)	So	St. Charles/Southwestern Illinois	St. Charles, Missouri
F	15	A.J. Stewart	6 ft 7 in (2.01 m)	218 lb (99 kg)	So	Arlington Country Day	Jacksonville, Florida
F	21	Perry Stevenson	6 ft 9 in (2.06 m)	215 lb (98 kg)	Jr	Lafayette	Lafayette, Louisiana
G	23	Jodie Meeks	6 ft 4 in (1.93 m)	208 lb (94 kg)	Jr	Norcross	Norcross, Georgia
G	25	Donald Williams	6 ft 3 in (1.91 m)	205 lb (93 kg)	Fr	Progressive Christian Academy	Baton Rouge, Louisiana
G	30	Dwight Perry	6 ft 1 in (1.85 m)	187 lb (85 kg)	Jr	Southern	Durham, North Carolina
F	33	Matt Pilgrim (redshirt)	6 ft 8 in (2.03 m)	233 lb (106 kg)	Jr	Bridgton Academy/Hampton	Cincinnati, Ohio
G	34	DeAndre Liggins	6 ft 6 in (1.98 m)	202 lb (92 kg)	Fr	Findlay Prep (NV)	Chicago, Illinois
C	43	Jared Carter	7 ft 2 in (2.18 m)	277 lb (126 kg)	Sr	Scott County	Georgetown, Kentucky
F	54	Patrick Patterson	6 ft 9 in (2.06 m)	235 lb (107 kg)	So	Huntington	Huntington, West Virginia
C	55	Josh Harrellson	6 ft 10 in (2.08 m)	265 lb (120 kg)	So	St. Charles/Southwestern Illinois	St. Charles, Missouri

Head coach

- Billy Gillispie (Texas State)

Assistant coach(es)

- Tracy Webster (Wisconsin)
- Glynn Cyprien (Southern)
- Jeremy Cox (Mesa State)

Legend

- (C) Team captain
- (S) Suspended
- (I) Ineligible
- (W) Walk-on
- Injured
- Current redshirt

=== 2008 signees ===
College recruiting information (2008)
Name	Hometown	School	Height	Weight	Commit date
DeAndre Liggins; G	Chicago, Illinois	Findlay Prep	6 ft 6 in (1.98 m)	202 lb (92 kg)	Jun 27, 2007
DeAndre Liggins; G	Recruit ratings: Scout: Rivals: (89)				
Darius Miller; G/F	Maysville, Kentucky	Mason County	6 ft 7 in (2.01 m)	223 lb (101 kg)	Sep 7, 2007
Darius Miller; G/F	Recruit ratings: Scout: Rivals: (91)				
Kevin Galloway; G/F	Sacramento, California	College of Southern Idaho	6 ft 6 in (1.98 m)	215 lb (98 kg)	Mar 10, 2008
Kevin Galloway; G/F	Recruit ratings: Scout: Rivals: (n/a)				
Josh Harrellson; C	St. Charles, Missouri	Southwestern Illinois Community College	6 ft 10 in (2.08 m)	265 lb (120 kg)	Apr 29, 2008
Josh Harrellson; C	Recruit ratings: Scout: Rivals: (n/a)				
Overall recruit ranking: Scout: 15 Rivals: 21
Note: In many cases, Scout, Rivals, 247Sports, On3, and ESPN may conflict in their listings of height and weight.; In these cases, the average was taken. ESPN grades are on a 100-point scale.; Sources: "Kentucky 2008 Basketball Commitments". Rivals.; "2008 Kentucky Basketball Commits". Scout.; "ESPN". ESPN.; "Scout.com Team Recruiting Rankings". Scout.; "2008 Team Ranking". Rivals.

== 2008–09 schedule and results ==
Date time, TV	Rank^{#}	Opponent^{#}	Result	Record	Site (attendance) city, state
Exhibition
November 3, 2008*; 7:00 pm, FSN South		Missouri-Saint Louis	W 111–53	0–0	Rupp Arena; Lexington, KY
November 7, 2008*; 7:00 pm, FSN South		Ouachita Baptist	W 94–72	0–0	Rupp Arena; Lexington, KY
Non-Conference Regular Season
November 14, 2008*; 7:00 pm, FSN South		VMI	L 103–111	0–1	Rupp Arena (22,579); Lexington, KY
November 18, 2008*; 9:00 pm, ESPN		at No. 1 North Carolina	L 58–77	0–2	Dean Smith Center (21,538); Chapel Hill, NC
November 22, 2008*; 12:00 pm, FSN South		Delaware State; 2008 Findlay Toyota Las Vegas Invitational	W 71–42	1–2	Rupp Arena (21,594); Lexington, KY
November 24, 2008*; 7:00 pm, FSN South		Longwood; 2008 Findlay Toyota Las Vegas Invitational	W 91–57	2–2	Rupp Arena (20,105); Lexington, KY
November 28, 2008*; 11:59 pm, ESPNU		vs. Kansas State; 2008 Findlay Toyota Las Vegas Invitational	W 74–72	3–2	Orleans Arena (5,000); Las Vegas, NV
November 29, 2008*; 10:30 pm, ESPN2		vs. West Virginia; 2008 Findlay Toyota Las Vegas Invitational	W 54–43	4–2	Orleans Arena (5,500); Las Vegas, NV
December 3, 2008*; 7:00 pm, FSN South		Lamar	W 103–61	5–2	Rupp Arena (21,350); Lexington, KY
December 6, 2008*; 5:00 pm, ESPN		No. 22 Miami (FL)	L 67–73	5–3	Rupp Arena (24,109); Lexington, KY
December 7, 2008*; 3:00 pm, FSN South		Mississippi Valley State	W 88–65	6–3	Rupp Arena (21,476); Lexington, KY
December 13, 2008*; 4:00 pm, CBS		Indiana	W 72–54	7–3	Rupp Arena (23,767); Lexington, KY
December 20, 2008*; 12:00 pm, FSN South		Appalachian State	W 93–69	8–3	Freedom Hall (10,173); Louisville, KY
December 22, 2008*; 7:00 pm, FSN South		Tennessee State	W 102–58	9–3	Rupp Arena (21,958); Lexington, KY
December 27, 2008*; 3:00 pm, FSN South		Florida Atlantic	W 76–69	10–3	Rupp Arena (24,018); Lexington, KY
December 29, 2008*; 7:00 pm, FSN South		Central Michigan	W 84–52	11–3	Rupp Arena (22,944); Lexington, KY
January 4, 2009*; 4:30 pm, CBS		at No. 18 Louisville; Battle for the Bluegrass	L 71–74	11–4	Freedom Hall (20,078); Louisville, KY
SEC Regular Season
January 10, 2009; 2:00 pm, Raycom		Vanderbilt	W 70–60	12–4 (1–0)	Rupp Arena (24,249); Lexington, KY
January 13, 2009; 9:00 pm, ESPN		at Tennessee	W 90–72	13–4 (2–0)	Thompson-Boling Arena (20,474); Knoxville, TN
January 18, 2009; 9:00 pm, Raycom		at Georgia	W 68–45	14–4 (3–0)	Stegeman Coliseum (9,090); Athens, GA
January 21, 2009; 9:00 pm, Raycom		Auburn	W 73–64	15–4 (4–0)	Rupp Arena (22,760); Lexington, KY
January 24, 2009; 3:00 pm, Raycom		at Alabama	W 61–51	16–4 (5–0)	Coleman Coliseum (15,316); Tuscaloosa, AL
January 27, 2009; 7:00 pm, ESPN	No. 24	at Ole Miss	L 80–85	16–5 (5–1)	Tad Smith Coliseum (6,852); Oxford, MS
January 31, 2009; 3:00 pm, Raycom	No. 24	South Carolina	L 77–78	16–6 (5–2)	Rupp Arena (24,322); Lexington, KY
February 3, 2009; 7:00 pm, Raycom		Mississippi State	L 57–66	16–7 (5–3)	Rupp Arena (21,940); Lexington, KY
February 10, 2009; 9:00 pm, ESPN		Florida	W 68–65	17–7 (6–3)	Rupp Arena (24,355); Lexington, KY
February 14, 2009; 1:00 pm, CBS		at Arkansas	W 79–63	18–7 (7–3)	Bud Walton Arena (19,041); Fayetteville, AR
February 17, 2009; 9:00 pm, ESPN		at Vanderbilt	L 64–77	18–8 (7–4)	Memorial Gymnasium (14,316); Nashville, TN
February 21, 2009; 1:00 pm, CBS		Tennessee	W 77–58	19–8 (8–4)	Rupp Arena (24,394); Lexington, KY
February 25, 2009; 7:00 pm, Raycom		at South Carolina	L 59–77	19–9 (8–5)	Colonial Life Arena (16,035); Columbia, SC
February 28, 2009; 4:00 pm, CBS		No. 18 LSU	L 70–73	19–10 (8–6)	Rupp Arena (24,411); Lexington, KY
March 4, 2009; 8:00 pm, Raycom		Georgia; Senior Night	L 85–90	19–11 (8–7)	Rupp Arena (23,889); Lexington, KY
March 7, 2009; 2:00 pm, CBS		at Florida	L 53–60	19–12 (8–8)	O'Connell Center (12,131); Gainesville, FL
SEC Tournament
March 12, 2009; 1:00 pm, Raycom	(E4)	vs. (W5) Ole Miss; First Round	W 71–58	20–12	St. Pete Times Forum (N/A); Tampa, FL
March 13, 2009; 1:00 pm, Raycom	(E4)	vs. (W1) No. 20 LSU; Quarterfinals	L 58–67	20–13	St. Pete Times Forum (N/A); Tampa, FL
National Invitation Tournament
March 17, 2009*; 9:30 pm, ESPN	(4)	(5) UNLV; First Round	W 70–60	21–13	Memorial Coliseum (8,327); Lexington, KY
March 23, 2009*; 7:00 pm, ESPN	(4)	at (1) Creighton; Second round	W 65–63	22–13	Qwest Center Omaha (16,984); Omaha, NE
March 25, 2009*; 7:00 pm, ESPN2	(4)	at (2) Notre Dame; Quarterfinals	L 67–77	22–14	Edmund P. Joyce Center (7,636); Notre Dame, IN
*Non-conference game. ^{#}Rankings from Coaches' Poll. (#) Tournament seedings in parentheses.

== Season honors and awards ==
=== All-SEC ===
Team	Player	Position
First	Jodie Meeks	Guard
First	Patrick Patterson	Forward
All-SEC

=== SEC Player of the Week ===
Date	Player	Position
12/1	Jodie Meeks	Guard
12/22	Jodie Meeks	Guard
12/29	Patrick Patterson	Forward
1/19	Jodie Meeks	Guard
2/16	Jodie Meeks	Guard
SEC Player of the Week

=== SEC Freshman of the Week ===
Date	Player	Position
12/8	DeAndre Liggins	Guard
SEC Freshman of the Week

=== Pre-Season All-SEC ===
Team	Player	Position
First	Patrick Patterson	Forward
Second	Jodie Meeks	Guard
All-SEC

== Class of 2009 signees ==
The signees who formed the 2009-10 recruiting classes are considered one of the best all-time recruiting classes

College recruiting information (2009)
Name	Hometown	School	Height	Weight	Commit date
John Wall; PG	Raleigh, North Carolina	Word of God	6 ft 4 in (1.93 m)	184 lb (83 kg)	May 18, 2009
John Wall; PG	Recruit ratings: Scout: Rivals: (98)				
DeMarcus Cousins; PF	Mobile, Alabama	LeFlore	6 ft 9 in (2.06 m)	250 lb (110 kg)	Apr 8, 2009
DeMarcus Cousins; PF	Recruit ratings: Scout: Rivals: (98)				
Daniel Orton; C	Oklahoma City, Oklahoma	Bishop McGuinness	6 ft 10 in (2.08 m)	265 lb (120 kg)	Oct 12, 2008
Daniel Orton; C	Recruit ratings: Scout: Rivals: (97)				
Eric Bledsoe; G	Birmingham, Alabama	Parker	6 ft 1 in (1.85 m)	180 lb (82 kg)	May 6, 2009
Eric Bledsoe; G	Recruit ratings: Scout: Rivals: (90)				
Jon Hood; SG	Madisonville, Kentucky	Madisonville-North Hopkins	6 ft 6 in (1.98 m)	185 lb (84 kg)	May 25, 2008
Jon Hood; SG	Recruit ratings: Scout: Rivals: (91)				
Darnell Dodson; G/F	Greenbelt, Maryland	Miami-Dade CC	6 ft 7 in (2.01 m)	215 lb (98 kg)	Apr 22, 2009
Darnell Dodson; G/F	Recruit ratings: Scout: Rivals: (95)				
Overall recruit ranking: Scout: 1 Rivals: 1 ESPN: 1
Note: In many cases, Scout, Rivals, 247Sports, On3, and ESPN may conflict in their listings of height and weight.; In these cases, the average was taken. ESPN grades are on a 100-point scale.; Sources: "Kentucky 2009 Basketball Commitments". Rivals.; "2009 Kentucky Basketball Commits". Scout.; "ESPN". ESPN.; "Scout.com Team Recruiting Rankings". Scout.; "2009 Team Ranking". Rivals.
