= List of Southeastern Conference men's basketball champions =

Below is a list of SEC Men's Basketball Champions and Award Winners.

== Champions and Award Winners ==
Official SEC champions in bold. From 1933 to 1952, except 1935, the SEC only awarded a championship to the winner of the conference tournament. In 1935 and from 1953 to 1978, the SEC did not hold a conference tournament and awarded its championship to the team with the best conference winning percentage. Since 1979, the SEC has held a conference tournament but continues to award the SEC Championship to the team with the best conference winning percentage.

From the 1939 to 1950, the NCAA tournament did not guarantee bids to conferences, and the SEC champion only participated in four tournaments. Starting in 1951, the NCAA has guaranteed a bid to the SEC champion. From 1951 to 1974, the team with the best conference winning percentage was awarded the SEC's sole bid to the NCAA tournament. Two teams in the 1950s declined the bid after players were declared ineligible for the tournament by the NCAA, and four champions declined the bid between 1959 and 1962 due to segregationist policies banning the schools from playing teams with black players; in these cases the other co-champion or the runner-up represented the SEC in the NCAA tournament. In 1972 and 1974, two ties were broken by head-to-head results or rankings. In 1975, the NCAA expanded the tournament field and allowed multiple teams from each conference, making tiebreakers between co-champions unnecessary. Since 1979, the SEC Tournament Champion is awarded the SEC's automatic bid to the NCAA tournament.

The SEC Player of the Year was first awarded in 1965.

For the years when the SEC held the conference tournament and did not officially award a regular season champion, this table uses the modern definition of the regular season championship of having the best winning percentage.

Year	Regular Season Champion(s)	SEC Tournament Champion	SEC Player of the Year	NCAA Tournament Results
1933	Kentucky	**Kentucky**		
1934	Kentucky	**Alabama**		
1935	**Kentucky**; **LSU**	No Tournament		
1936	Kentucky	**Tennessee**		
1937	Georgia Tech	**Kentucky**		
1938	Kentucky	**Georgia Tech**		
1939	Alabama	**Kentucky** (Note: Kentucky was not selected for the 1939 NCAA tournament.)		
1940	Alabama	**Kentucky** (Note: Kentucky declined a bid to the 1940 NCAA tournament.)		
1941	Kentucky	**Tennessee** (Note: Tennessee was not selected for the 1941 NCAA tournament.)		
1942	Tennessee	**Kentucky** (Note: Kentucky was selected for the 1942 NCAA tournament.)		Kentucky 1942 Final Four
1943	Kentucky	**Tennessee** (Note: Tennessee was not selected for the 1943 NCAA tournament.)		
1944	Georgia Tech; Tulane	**Kentucky** (Note: Kentucky was not selected for the 1944 NCAA tournament.)		
1945	Kentucky; Tennessee	**Kentucky** (Note: Kentucky was selected for the 1945 NCAA tournament.)		
1946	Kentucky; LSU	**Kentucky** (Note: Kentucky was not selected for the 1946 NCAA tournament.)		
1947	Kentucky	**Kentucky** (Note: Kentucky was not selected for the 1947 NCAA tournament.)		
1948	Kentucky	**Kentucky** (Note: Kentucky was selected for the 1948 NCAA tournament.)		**Kentucky 1948 NCAA Champions**
1949	Kentucky	**Kentucky** (Note: Kentucky was selected for the 1949 NCAA tournament.)		**Kentucky 1949 NCAA Champions**
1950	Kentucky	**Kentucky** (Note: Kentucky was not selected for the 1950 NCAA tournament.)		
1951	**Kentucky**	Vanderbilt		**Kentucky 1951 NCAA Champions**
1952	**Kentucky**	Kentucky		
1953	**LSU**	No Tournament		LSU 1953 Final Four
1954	**Kentucky**; **LSU** (Note: Kentucky beat LSU in a playoff game for the SEC's NCAA tournament bid, but declined the bid because the NCAA ruled three players ineligible for the tournament. As a result, LSU represented the SEC in the 1954 tournament.)	No Tournament		
1955	**Kentucky**	No Tournament		
1956	**Alabama** (Note: Alabama declined the bid to the NCAA tournament after the NCAA deemed their starting lineup ineligible for having played as freshmen. Runner-up Kentucky represented the SEC in the 1956 tournament.)	No Tournament		
1957	**Kentucky**	No Tournament		
1958	**Kentucky**	No Tournament		**Kentucky 1958 NCAA Champions**
1959	**Mississippi State** (Note: Mississippi State declined the NCAA bid due to their segregationist policy against playing teams with black players. Runner-up Kentucky represented the SEC in the 1959 tournament.)	No Tournament		
1960	**Auburn** (Note: Auburn declined the NCAA bid due to their segregationist policy against playing teams with black players. Runner-up Georgia Tech represented the SEC in the 1960 tournament.)	No Tournament		
1961	**Mississippi State** (Note: Mississippi State declined the NCAA bid due to their segregationist policy against playing teams with black players. Runner-up Kentucky represented the SEC in the 1961 tournament.)	No Tournament		
1962	**Kentucky (Note: Mississippi State declined the NCAA bid due to their segregationist policy against playing teams with black players. Co-champion Kentucky represented the SEC in the 1962 tournament.)**; **Mississippi State**	No Tournament		
1963	**Mississippi State** (Note: See Game of Change.)	No Tournament		
1964	**Kentucky**	No Tournament		
1965	**Vanderbilt**	No Tournament	Clyde Lee, Vanderbilt	
1966	**Kentucky**	No Tournament	Clyde Lee, Vanderbilt; Pat Riley, Kentucky	Kentucky 1966 NCAA Runner-Up
1967	**Tennessee**	No Tournament	Ron Widby, Tennessee	
1968	**Kentucky**	No Tournament	Pete Maravich, LSU	
1969	**Kentucky**	No Tournament	Pete Maravich, LSU	
1970	**Kentucky**	No Tournament	Pete Maravich, LSU	
1971	**Kentucky**	No Tournament	Johnny Neumann, Ole Miss	
1972	**Kentucky (Note: As a result of Kentucky beating Tennessee in both regular-season matchups, Kentucky represented the SEC in the 1972 tournament.)**; **Tennessee**	No Tournament	Mike Edwards, Tennessee; Tom Parker, Kentucky	
1973	**Kentucky**	No Tournament	Kevin Grevey, Kentucky; Wendell Hudson, Alabama	
1974	**Alabama**; **Vanderbilt** (Note: Vanderbilt received the SEC's bid to the 1974 NCAA tournament because they were ranked higher than co-champion Alabama.)	No Tournament	Jan van Breda Kolff, Vanderbilt	
1975	**Alabama**; **Kentucky**	No Tournament	Kevin Grevey, Kentucky; Bernard King, Tennessee	Kentucky 1975 NCAA Runner-Up
1976	**Alabama**	No Tournament	Bernard King, Tennessee	
1977	**Kentucky**; **Tennessee**	No Tournament	Ernie Grunfeld, Tennessee; Bernard King, Tennessee	
1978	**Kentucky**	No Tournament	Reggie King, Alabama	**Kentucky 1978 NCAA Champions**
1979	**LSU**	Tennessee	Reggie King, Alabama	
1980	**Kentucky**	LSU	Kyle Macy, Kentucky	
1981	**LSU**	Ole Miss	Dominique Wilkins, Georgia	LSU 1981 Final Four
1982	**Kentucky**; **Tennessee**	Alabama	Dale Ellis, Tennessee	
1983	**Kentucky**	Georgia	Dale Ellis, Tennessee; Jeff Malone, Mississippi State	Georgia 1983 Final Four
1984	**Kentucky**	Kentucky	Charles Barkley, Auburn	Kentucky 1984 Final Four
1985	**LSU**	Auburn	Kenny Walker, Kentucky	
1986	**Kentucky**	Kentucky	Kenny Walker, Kentucky	LSU 1986 Final Four
1987	**Alabama**	Alabama	Derrick McKey, Alabama; Tony White, Tennessee	
1988	Kentucky (stripped) (Note: The presidents of the Southeastern Conference voted to strip Kentucky of their 1988 regular season and conference tournament championships due to NCAA violations. Note that these games were not vacated by the NCAA; only Kentucky's 1988 NCAA Tournament games were vacated.)	Kentucky (stripped)	Will Perdue, Vanderbilt	
1989	**Florida**	Alabama	Chris Jackson, LSU	
1990	**Georgia**	Alabama	Chris Jackson, LSU	
1991	**LSU**; **Mississippi State** (Note: Kentucky had the best conference record at 14–4, one game ahead of the co-champions, but they were not eligible for the championship due to NCAA sanctions.)	Alabama	Shaquille O'Neal, LSU	
1992	**Arkansas**	Kentucky	Shaquille O'Neal, LSU	
1993	**Vanderbilt**	Kentucky	Billy McCaffrey, Vanderbilt; Jamal Mashburn, Kentucky	Kentucky 1993 Final Four
1994	**Arkansas**	Kentucky	Corliss Williamson, Arkansas	**Arkansas 1994 NCAA Champions**; Florida 1994 Final Four
1995	**Kentucky**	Kentucky	Corliss Williamson, Arkansas	Arkansas 1995 NCAA Runner-Up
1996	**Kentucky**	Mississippi State	Tony Delk, Kentucky	**Kentucky 1996 NCAA Champions**; Mississippi State 1996 Final Four
1997	**South Carolina**	Kentucky	Ron Mercer, Kentucky	Kentucky 1997 NCAA Runner-Up
1998	**Kentucky**	Kentucky	Ansu Sesay, Ole Miss	**Kentucky 1998 NCAA Champions**
1999	**Auburn**	Kentucky	Chris Porter, Auburn	
2000	**Florida**; **Kentucky**; **LSU**; **Tennessee**	Arkansas	Dan Langhi, Vanderbilt; Stromile Swift, LSU	Florida 2000 NCAA Runner-Up
2001	**Florida**; **Kentucky**	Kentucky	Tayshaun Prince, Kentucky	
2002	**Alabama**	Mississippi State	Erwin Dudley, Alabama	
2003	**Kentucky**	Kentucky	Keith Bogans, Kentucky; Ron Slay, Tennessee	
2004	**Mississippi State**	Kentucky	Lawrence Roberts, Mississippi State	
2005	**Kentucky**	Florida	Brandon Bass, LSU	
2006	**LSU**	Florida	Glen Davis, LSU	**Florida 2006 NCAA Champions**; LSU 2006 Final Four
2007	**Florida**	Florida	Derrick Byars, Vanderbilt; Chris Lofton, Tennessee	**Florida 2007 NCAA Champions**
2008	**Tennessee**	Georgia	Shan Foster, Vanderbilt	
2009	**LSU**	Mississippi State	Marcus Thornton, LSU	
2010	**Kentucky**	Kentucky	John Wall, Kentucky	
2011	**Florida**	Kentucky	Chandler Parsons, Florida	Kentucky 2011 Final Four
2012	**Kentucky**	Vanderbilt	Anthony Davis, Kentucky	**Kentucky 2012 NCAA Champions**
2013	**Florida**	Ole Miss	Kentavious Caldwell-Pope, Georgia	
2014	**Florida**	Florida	Scottie Wilbekin, Florida	Kentucky 2014 NCAA Runner-up; Florida 2014 Final Four
2015	**Kentucky**	Kentucky	Bobby Portis, Arkansas	Kentucky 2015 Final Four
2016	**Texas A&M** **Kentucky**	Kentucky	Tyler Ulis, Kentucky	
2017	**Kentucky**	Kentucky	Malik Monk, Kentucky; Sindarius Thornwell, South Carolina	South Carolina 2017 Final Four
2018	**Auburn**; **Tennessee**	Kentucky	Yante Maten, Georgia; Grant Williams, Tennessee	
2019	**LSU**	Auburn	Grant Williams, Tennessee	Auburn 2019 Final Four
2020	**Kentucky**	Cancelled (Note: The tournament was cancelled before the start of the second day due to the COVID-19 pandemic. Kentucky, the regular season champions, was awarded the SEC's automatic bid to the NCAA Tournament, but that was subsequently cancelled as well. Two first round games were completed on the first day.)	Mason Jones, Arkansas; Reggie Perry, Mississippi State; Immanuel Quickley, Kentucky	
2021	**Alabama**	Alabama	Herb Jones, Alabama	
2022	**Auburn**	Tennessee	Oscar Tshiebwe, Kentucky	
2023	**Alabama**	Alabama	Brandon Miller, Alabama	
2024	**Tennessee**	Auburn	Dalton Knecht, Tennessee	Alabama 2024 Final Four
2025	**Auburn**	Florida	Johni Broome, Auburn	**Florida 2025 NCAA Champions**; Auburn 2025 Final Four
2026	**Florida**	**Arkansas**	Darius Acuff Jr, Arkansas	

=== Divisional Championships ===
From 1992 to 2011 the SEC was organized into two divisions and divisional championships were awarded. Bold denotes the conference regular season champion(s).

Year	Eastern Division Champion(s)	Western Division Champion(s)
1992	Kentucky	**Arkansas**
1993	**Vanderbilt**	Arkansas
1994	Florida; Kentucky	**Arkansas**
1995	**Kentucky**	Arkansas; Mississippi State
1996	**Kentucky**	Mississippi State
1997	**South Carolina**	Ole Miss
1998	**Kentucky**	Ole Miss
1999	Tennessee	**Auburn**
2000	**Florida**; **Kentucky**; **Tennessee**	**LSU**
2001	**Kentucky**; **Florida**	Ole Miss
2002	Georgia (vacated) (Note: Georgia later vacated their 2002 Eastern Division Co-Championship); Kentucky; Florida	**Alabama**
2003	**Kentucky**	Mississippi State
2004	Kentucky	**Mississippi State**
2005	**Kentucky**	Alabama; LSU
2006	Tennessee	**LSU**
2007	**Florida**	Mississippi State; Ole Miss
2008	**Tennessee**	Mississippi State
2009	Tennessee; South Carolina	**LSU**
2010	**Kentucky**	Mississippi State; Ole Miss
2011	**Florida**	Alabama

== Regular season championships by school ==
From 1933 to 1952, except 1935, regular season championships are unofficial and defined by the current SEC standard of best conference winning percentage.

School	Number	Last	List
Kentucky	50	2020	1933, 1934, 1935 (Note: Co-champions), 1936, 1938, 1941, 1943, 1945, 1946, 1947, 1948, 1949, 1950, 1951, 1952, 1954, 1955, 1957, 1958, 1962, 1964, 1966, 1968, 1969, 1970, 1971, 1972, 1973, 1975, 1977, 1978, 1980, 1982, 1983, 1984, 1986, 1992, 1995, 1996, 1998, 2000, 2001, 2003, 2005, 2010, 2012, 2015, 2016, 2017, 2020
LSU	12	2019	1935, 1946, 1953, 1954, 1979, 1981, 1985, 1991, 2000, 2006, 2009, 2019
Tennessee	11	2024	1942, 1943, 1945, 1967, 1972, 1977, 1982, 2000, 2008, 2018, 2024
Alabama	10	2023	1939, 1940, 1956, 1974, 1975, 1976, 1987, 2002, 2021, 2023
Florida	8	2026	1989, 2000, 2001, 2007, 2011, 2013, 2014, 2026
Mississippi State	6	2004	1959, 1961, 1962, 1963, 1991, 2004
Auburn	5	2025	1960, 1999, 2018, 2022, 2025
Vanderbilt	3	1993	1965, 1974, 1993
Arkansas (Note: Arkansas joined the SEC in the 1992–93 season.)	2	1994	1992, 1994
Georgia Tech (Note: Georgia Tech was a member of the SEC from 1932 to 1964.)	2	1944	1937, 1944
Texas A&M (Note: Texas A&M joined the SEC in the 2012–13 season.)	1	2016	2016
South Carolina (Note: South Carolina joined the SEC in the 1992–93 season.)	1	1997	1997
Georgia	1	1990	1990
Tulane (Note: Tulane was a member of the SEC from 1932 to 1966.)	1	1944	1944
Missouri (Note: Missouri joined the SEC in the 2012–13 season.)	0	—	
Oklahoma (Note: Oklahoma joined the SEC in the 2024–25 season.)	0	—	
Ole Miss	0	—	
Sewanee (Note: Sewanee was a member of the SEC from 1932 to 1940.)	0	—	
Texas (Note: Texas joined the SEC in the 2024–25 season.)	0	—	

=== Divisional championships by school ===
School	Division	Number	Last	List
Kentucky	Eastern	12	2010	1992, 1994, 1995, 1996, 1998, 2000, 2001, 2002, 2003, 2004, 2005, 2010
Mississippi State	Western	7	2010	1995, 1996, 2003, 2004, 2007, 2008, 2010
Florida	Eastern	6	2011	1994, 2000, 2001, 2002, 2007, 2011
Ole Miss	Western	5	2010	1997, 1998, 2001, 2007, 2010
Tennessee	Eastern	5	2008	1999, 2000, 2006, 2008, 2009
Arkansas	Western	4	1995	1992, 1993, 1994, 1995
LSU	Western	4	2009	2000, 2005, 2006, 2009
Alabama	Western	3	2011	2002, 2005, 2011
South Carolina	Eastern	2	2009	1997, 2009
Auburn	Western	1	1999	1999
Vanderbilt	Eastern	1	1993	1993
Georgia	Eastern	0	—	

== Tournament championships by school ==
No tournament was held in 1935 or from 1953 to 1978.

School	Number	Last	List
Kentucky	31	2018	1933, 1937, 1939, 1940, 1942, 1944, 1945, 1946, 1947, 1948, 1949, 1950, 1952, 1984, 1986, 1992, 1993, 1994, 1995, 1997, 1998, 1999, 2001, 2003, 2004, 2010, 2011, 2015, 2016, 2017, 2018
Alabama	8	2023	1934, 1982, 1987, 1989, 1990, 1991, 2021, 2023
Florida	5	2025	2005, 2006, 2007, 2014, 2025
Tennessee	5	2022	1936, 1941, 1943, 1979, 2022
Auburn	3	2024	1985, 2019, 2024
Mississippi State	3	2009	1996, 2002, 2009
Arkansas	2	2026	2000, 2026
Ole Miss	2	2013	1981, 2013
Vanderbilt	2	2012	1951, 2012
Georgia	2	2008	1983, 2008
LSU	1	1980	1980
Georgia Tech	1	1938	1938
Missouri	0	—	
Oklahoma	0	—	
Sewanee	0	—	
South Carolina	0	—	
Texas	0	—	
Texas A&M	0	—	
Tulane	0	—	

== Player of the year award winners by school ==
Player of the year first awarded in 1965. Two people have been awarded player of the year in the same season 13 times, one of which was to players on the same team. In 2020 three people were awarded player of the year, the only time more than two have received the award in the same season.

School	Winners	Years
Kentucky	18	1966 (Note: Co-player of the year with one other person.), 1972, 1973, 1975, 1980, 1985, 1986, 1993, 1996, 1997, 2001, 2003, 2010, 2012, 2016, 2017, 2020 (Note: Co-player of the year with two other people.), 2022
Tennessee	14	1967, 1972, 1975, 1976, 1977 (×2), 1982, 1983, 1987, 2003, 2007, 2018, 2019, 2024
LSU	11	1968, 1969, 1970, 1989, 1990, 1991, 1992, 2000, 2005, 2006, 2009
Vanderbilt	8	1965, 1966^{†}, 1974, 1988, 1993, 2000, 2007, 2008
Alabama	7	1973, 1978, 1979, 1987, 2002, 2021, 2023
Arkansas	5	1994, 1995, 2015, 2020, 2026
Auburn	3	1984, 1999, 2025
Mississippi State	3	1983, 2004, 2020
Georgia	3	1981, 2013, 2018
Florida	2	2011, 2014
Ole Miss	2	1971, 1998
South Carolina	1	2017
Missouri	0	
Oklahoma	0	
Texas	0	
Texas A&M	0	
Tulane	0	
