= 2008–09 Arkansas Razorbacks men's basketball team =

American college basketball season

2008–09 Arkansas Razorbacks men's basketball
- Conference: Southeastern Conference
- West
- Record: 14–16 (2–14 SEC)
- Head coach: John Pelphrey (2nd season)
- Assistant coaches: Rob Evans; Isaac Brown; Tom Ostrom
- Home arena: Bud Walton Arena

2008–09 Southeastern Conference men's basketball standings
	Conf.				Overall
Team	W		L	PCT	W		L	PCT
East
South Carolina	10	–	6	.625	21	–	10	.677
Tennessee	10	–	6	.625	21	–	13	.618
Florida	9	–	7	.563	25	–	11	.694
Vanderbilt	8	–	8	.500	19	–	12	.613
Kentucky	8	–	8	.500	22	–	14	.611
Georgia	3	–	13	.188	12	–	20	.375
West
No. 21 LSU	13	–	3	.813	27	–	8	.771
Auburn	10	–	6	.625	24	–	12	.667
Mississippi State†	9	–	7	.563	23	–	13	.639
Alabama	7	–	9	.438	18	–	14	.563
Ole Miss	7	–	9	.438	16	–	15	.516
Arkansas	2	–	14	.125	14	–	16	.467
† SEC Tournament winner Rankings from AP Poll

The 2008–09 Arkansas Razorbacks men's basketball team represented the University of Arkansas in the 2008–09 college basketball season. The head coach was John Pelphrey, serving for his second year. The team played its home games in Bud Walton Arena in Fayetteville, Arkansas.

== 2008–09 Roster ==
Entering the year, the Razorbacks pulled in the 24th best recruiting class of 2008, including ESPNU 100 recruit Rotnei Clarke. Clarke was ranked the sixth-best incoming point guard in the nation by ESPN.

Former Razorbacks football star receiver Marcus Monk returned with a sixth year of eligibility to play basketball for the Hogs. Intending to play both, Monk played 10 games for Stan Heath his freshman year before focusing only on football. Although picked in the 2008 NFL draft by the Chicago Bears, Monk never signed and remained an amateur athlete.

Monk returned to the University shortly after the departure of Montrell McDonald. McDonald left the team on his own accord after the South Alabama game.

2008–09 Arkansas Razorbacks men's basketball roster
Source: arkansasrazorbacks.com – The Official Site of University of Arkansas Athletics
Name	Number	Position	Height	Weight	Class	Hometown (Prev School)
Michael Washington	00	F	6–9	239	Junior	McGehee, AR (Genesis One Christian School)
Jason Henry^{a}	1	G/F	6–6	189	Freshman	West Memphis, AR (Harmony Prep [Cincinnati, Ohio])
Nick Mason	2	G	5–10	160	Freshman	Jonesboro, AR (Jonesboro HS)
Courtney Fortson^{b}	4	G	5–11	180	Freshman	Montgomery, AL (The Patterson Prep [Lenoir, N.C.])
Marcus Monk^{c}	10	G/F	6–6	220	Senior	Lepanto, AR (East Poinsett)
Brandon Moore^{d}	11	F	6–9	215	Freshmen	New Orleans, LA (Holy Cross HS)
Marcus Britt	12	G	6–3	198	Sophomore	Madison, AR (Forrest City HS)
Stefan Welsh	14	G	6–3	185	Junior	Newport News, VA (Hargrave Military Academy)
Rotnei Clarke	15	G	6–0	184	Freshman	Verdigris, OK (Verdigris HS)
John Paul Noland	21	G	6–3	185	Senior	Southlake, TX (Southlake Carroll HS)
Stephen Cox	25	G	6–3	201	Junior	Jonesboro, AR (Jonesboro HS)
Michael Sanchez	31	F	6–8	236	(redshirt) Freshman	Springdale, AR (Har-Ber HS)
Andre Clark	44	F	6–9	218	(redshirt) Freshman	North Little Rock, AR (North Little Rock West HS)

- ^a Jason Henry was held out of six games for undisclosed disciplinary issues.
- ^b Courtney Fortson was suspended on February 12 by John Pelphrey for an undisclosed disciplinary issue. He missed the Kentucky game on February 14, but returned to action four days later against LSU.
- ^c Marcus Monk was kept out of the January 24 game against Auburn with questions about his eligibility. Monk did not play again for the Razorbacks, and AD Jeff Long issued a release on February 13 stating that Monk is no longer with the team. Monk had completed his undergraduate degree.
- ^d Brandon Moore was suspended after an arrest for DUI on January 18, 2009. He would not return to play until January 31 against LSU, and would not score until the February 7 contest at Mississippi State.

== 2008–09 schedule and results ==
Retrieved from arkansasrazorbacks.com

Date time, TV	Rank^{#}	Opponent^{#}	Result	Record	Site (attendance) city, state
10/24/08*; 7:30 pm		Red-White exhibition	W 33–29		Bud Walton Arena; Fayetteville, AR
11/3/08*; 7:05 pm		Campbellsville exhibition	W 103–58		Bud Walton Arena; Fayetteville, AR
11/6/08*; 7:05 pm		Dillard exhibition	W 108–80		Bud Walton Arena; Fayetteville, AR
Regular season
11/14/08*; 7:05 pm		Southeastern Louisiana	W 91–87 ^{OT}	1–0	Bud Walton Arena (13,200); Fayetteville, AR
11/20/08*; 7:05 pm		UC-Davis	W 68–59	2–0	Bud Walton Arena (13,540); Fayetteville, AR
11/22/08*; 7:00 pm		at Missouri State	L 57–62	2–1	JQH Arena (10,285); Springfield, MO
11/26/08*; 8:00 pm, CSS		at South Alabama	W 79–77	3–1	Mitchell Center (6,148); Mobile, AL
11/29/08*; 2:05 pm		FAMU	W 86–61	4–1	Bud Walton Arena (13,720); Fayetteville, AR
12/3/08*; 7:05 pm, RSP		Texas Southern	W 80–61	5–1	Bud Walton Arena (13,506); Fayetteville, AR
12/10/08*; 7:05 pm, RSP		North Carolina Central	W 98–70	6–1	Bud Walton Arena (13,735); Fayetteville, AR
12/17/08*; 7:05 pm, SUN		Austin Peay; Jim Thorpe Classic	W 89–80	7–1	Bud Walton Arena (13,557); Fayetteville, AR
12/20/08*; 7:05 pm, RSP		Stephen F. Austin; Jim Thorpe Classic	W 67–51	8–1	Bud Walton Arena (13,872); Fayetteville, AR
12/27/08*; 5:05 pm, ESPN2		Northwestern State	W 95–56	9–1	Bud Walton Arena (14,281); Fayetteville, AR
12/30/08*; 7:05 pm, RSP		No. 4 Oklahoma	W 96–88	10–1	Bud Walton Arena (19,604); Fayetteville, AR
1/3/09*; 2:05 pm, RSP		North Texas	W 86–75	11–1	Alltel Arena (15,687); North Little Rock, AR
1/6/09*; 8:05 pm, ESPN2		No. 7 Texas	W 67–61	12–1	Bud Walton Arena (19,012); Fayetteville, AR
1/10/09; 7:05 pm, FSN		Mississippi State	L 56–70	12–2 (0–1)	Bud Walton Arena (18,884); Fayetteville, AR
1/14/09; 7:00 pm		at Ole Miss; Rivalry	L 65–74	12–3 (0–2)	Tad Smith Coliseum (6,609); Oxford, MS
1/17/09; 1:00 pm, Raycom		at Florida	L 65–80	12–4 (0–3)	O'Connell Center (12,348); Gainesville, FL
1/24/09; 1:05 pm, Raycom		Auburn	L 51–73	12–5 (0–4)	Bud Walton Arena (18,246); Fayetteville, AR
1/29/09; 8:05 pm, ESPN		Alabama	W 89–80	13–5 (1–4)	Bud Walton Arena (17,083); Fayetteville, AR
1/31/09; 4:00 pm, FSN		at LSU; Rivalry	L 69–79	13–6 (1–5)	Pete Maravich Assembly Center (12,698); Baton Rouge, LA
2/4/09; 7:05 pm, Raycom		Tennessee	L 74–72	13–7 (1–6)	Bud Walton Arena (16,064); Fayetteville, AR
2/7/09; 2:05 pm, Raycom		at Mississippi State	L 77–86	13–8 (1–7)	Humphrey Coliseum (8,891); Starkville, MS
2/11/09; 7:00 pm		at Auburn	L 62–75	13–9 (1–8)	Beard-Eaves-Memorial Coliseum (4,347); Auburn, AL
2/14/09; 12:05 pm, CBS		Kentucky	L 63–79	13–10 (1–9)	Bud Walton Arena (19,041); Fayetteville, AR
2/18/09; 7:05 pm		No. 23 LSU	L 69–72	13–11 (1–10)	Bud Walton Arena (16,079); Fayetteville, AR
2/21/09; 6:00 pm		at South Carolina	L 78–82 ^{OT}	13–12 (1–11)	Colonial Life Arena (16,507); Columbia, SC
2/25/09; 7:00 pm		at Alabama	L 67–88	13–13 (1–12)	Coleman Coliseum (9,161); Tuscaloosa, AL
3/1/09; 3:05 pm, Raycom		Georgia	W 89–67	14–13 (2–12)	Bud Walton Arena (19,724); Fayetteville, AR
3/4/09; 7:05 pm		Ole Miss; Rivalry	L 91–98 ^{OT}	14–14 (2–13)	Bud Walton Arena (15,633); Fayetteville, AR
3/8/09; 1:00 pm, Raycom		at Vanderbilt	L 58–75	14–15 (2–14)	Memorial Gymnasium (14,316); Nashville, TN
2009 SEC men's basketball tournament
3/12/09; 8:45 pm, Raycom		vs. Florida	L 58–73	14–16 (2–14)	St. Pete Times Forum (12,152); Tampa, FL
*Non-conference game. ^{#}Rankings from AP Poll. (#) Tournament seedings in parentheses.

== Awards and honors ==
- Courtney Fortson

SEC Player of the Week
Freshman Player of the Week
All-SEC, Freshman team

- Michael Washington

SEC Player of the Week
All-SEC, second team – Associated Press, SEC coaches
All-District VII – United States Basketball Writers Association
All-District 21, second team – National Association of Basketball Coaches

== See also ==
- Arkansas Razorbacks men's basketball
- John Pelphrey, head coach in his second year with the Hogs
- 2009 NCAA Men's Division I Basketball Tournament
- 2008-09 NCAA Division I men's basketball season
- The National Championship 1993–94 team, which returned for the March 1 game against Georgia.
