= 2008–09 Georgia Bulldogs basketball team =

American college basketball season

2008–09 Georgia Bulldogs men's basketball
- Conference: Southeastern Conference
- Eastern
- Record: 12–20 (3–13 SEC)
- Head coach: Dennis Felton (6th season); Pete Herrmann (interim)
- Home arena: Stegeman Coliseum

2008–09 Southeastern Conference men's basketball standings
	Conf.				Overall
Team	W		L	PCT	W		L	PCT
East
South Carolina	10	–	6	.625	21	–	10	.677
Tennessee	10	–	6	.625	21	–	13	.618
Florida	9	–	7	.563	25	–	11	.694
Vanderbilt	8	–	8	.500	19	–	12	.613
Kentucky	8	–	8	.500	22	–	14	.611
Georgia	3	–	13	.188	12	–	20	.375
West
No. 21 LSU	13	–	3	.813	27	–	8	.771
Auburn	10	–	6	.625	24	–	12	.667
Mississippi State†	9	–	7	.563	23	–	13	.639
Alabama	7	–	9	.438	18	–	14	.563
Ole Miss	7	–	9	.438	16	–	15	.516
Arkansas	2	–	14	.125	14	–	16	.467
† SEC Tournament winner Rankings from AP Poll

The 2008–09 Georgia Bulldogs men's basketball team represented the University of Georgia during the 2008–09 NCAA Division I men's basketball season. The Bulldogs were led by sixth-year head coach Dennis Felton. They played their home games at Stegeman Coliseum as members of the Southeastern Conference. They finished the season 12–20, 3–13 in SEC play and lost in the first round of the 2009 SEC men's basketball tournament to Mississippi State.

Dennis Felton was fired on January 29, 2009. Assistant coach Pete Herrmann was named interim head coach for the remainder of the season.

== Previous season ==
The Bulldogs finished the 2007–08 season 17–17 overall and 4–12 in SEC play. In the SEC tournament, they defeated Ole Miss, Kentucky, Mississippi State, and Arkansas earning the Bulldogs their first trip to the NCAA tournament since 2002. In the NCAA tournament, they received the #14 seed in the West Region, where they would lose to #3 seeded Xavier in the first round.

== Roster ==
2008–09 Georgia Bulldogs men's basketball team
Players
Coaches

Pos.	#	Name	Height	Weight	Year	Hometown
G	1	Travis Leslie	6 ft 4 in (1.93 m)	205 lb (93 kg)	Fr	Decatur, Georgia
G	2	Zac Swansey	6 ft 1 in (1.85 m)	180 lb (82 kg)	So	Dunwoody, Georgia
G	3	Dustin Ware	5 ft 11 in (1.8 m)	172 lb (78 kg)	Fr	Powder Springs, Georgia
F	4	Chris Barnes	6 ft 8 in (2.03 m)	240 lb (109 kg)	So	Riverdale, Georgia
G	10	Ricky McPhee	6 ft 1 in (1.85 m)	184 lb (83 kg)	Jr	Lawrenceville, Georgia
G	12	Matt Bucklin	6 ft 0 in (1.83 m)	170 lb (77 kg)	Fr	Marietta, Georgia
F	20	Drazen Zlovaric	6 ft 9 in (2.06 m)	220 lb (100 kg)	Fr	Novi Sad, Serbia
G	23	Corey Butler	6 ft 3 in (1.91 m)	195 lb (88 kg)	Sr	Decatur, Georgia
G	30	Terrence Woodbury	6 ft 7 in (2.01 m)	221 lb (100 kg)	Sr	Virginia Beach, Virginia
F	33	Trey Thompkins	6 ft 10 in (2.08 m)	245 lb (111 kg)	Fr	Lithonia, Georgia
F	34	Albert Jackson	6 ft 11 in (2.11 m)	265 lb (120 kg)	Jr	Earlington, Kentucky
F	50	Jeremy Price	6 ft 8 in (2.03 m)	270 lb (122 kg)	So	Decatur, Georgia

Head coach

- Dennis Felton (Howard)

Assistant coach(es)

{{{asst_coach}}}

Legend

- (C) Team captain
- (S) Suspended
- (I) Ineligible
- (W) Walk-on
- Injured
- Current redshirt

== Schedule ==
Date time, TV	Rank^{#}	Opponent^{#}	Result	Record	Site (attendance) city, state
Non-conference regular season
November 14, 2008*		USC Upstate	W 72–48	1–0	Stegeman Coliseum (6,179); Athens, GA
November 17, 2008*		vs. Loyola (IL)	L 53–74	1–1	Mackey Arena; West Lafayette, IN
November 18, 2008*		vs. Eastern Michigan	W 61–60	2–1	Mackey Arena; West Lafayette, IN
November 21, 2008*		Presbyterian	W 55–47	3–1	Stegeman Coliseum; Athens, GA
November 24, 2008*		Santa Clara	W 54–48	4–1	Stegeman Coliseum; Athens, GA
November 25, 2008*		Mississippi Valley State	W 98–57	5–1	Stegeman Coliseum; Athens, GA
December 2, 2008*		at Western Kentucky	L 63–67	5–2	E. A. Diddle Arena (7,086); Bowling Green, KY
December 6, 2008*		vs. Illinois	L 42–76	5–3	United Center (12,139); Chicago, IL
December 9, 2008*		Virginia Tech	W 67–66	6–3	Stegeman Coliseum; Athens, GA
December 20, 2008*		Wofford	W 74–73 ^{OT}	7–3	Stegeman Coliseum; Athens, GA
December 22, 2008*		Texas A&M-Corpus Christi	L 79–80 ^{OT}	7–4	Stegeman Coliseum; Athens, GA
December 28, 2008*		North Carolina A&T	W 98–68	8–4	Stegeman Coliseum; Athens, GA
December 31, 2008*		Kennesaw State	W 72–52	9–4	Stegeman Coliseum; Athens, GA
January 3, 2009*		Missouri	L 76–83	9–5	Stegeman Coliseum (8,060); Athens, GA
January 6, 2009*		at Georgia Tech; Clean, Old-Fashioned Hate	L 62–67	9–6	Alexander Memorial Coliseum; Atlanta GA
SEC regular season
January 10, 2009		No. 15 Tennessee	L 77–86	9–7 (0–1)	Stegeman Coliseum (8,769); Athens, GA
January 14, 2009		at Vanderbilt	L 40–50	9–8 (0–2)	Memorial Gymnasium (13,972); Nashville, Tennessee
January 18, 2009		Kentucky	L 45–68	9–9 (0–3)	Stegeman Coliseum (9,090); Athens, GA
January 24, 2009		Mississippi State	L 61–67	9–10 (0–4)	Stegeman Coliseum; Athens, GA
January 28, 2009		at Florida	L 57–83	9–11 (0–5)	O'Connell Center; Gainesville, FL
January 31, 2009		at Alabama	L 70–75	9–12 (0–6)	Coleman Coliseum (11,046); Tuscaloosa, AL
February 4, 2009; 7:00 pm		LSU	L 62–80	9–13 (0–7)	Stegeman Coliseum (6,659); Athens, GA
February 7, 2009		at South Carolina	L 68–79	9–14 (0–8)	Colonial Life Arena (18,000); Columbia, SC
February 11, 2009		at Tennessee	L 48–79	9–15 (0–9)	Thompson–Boling Arena (18,623); Knoxville, TN
February 14, 2009		Florida	W 88–86	10–15 (1–9)	Stegeman Coliseum; Athens, GA
February 18, 2009		Auburn	L 59–71	10–16 (1–10)	Stegeman Coliseum (6,707); Athens, GA
February 21, 2009		at Ole Miss	L 47–69	10–17 (1–11)	Tad Smith Coliseum; Oxford, MS
February 25, 2009		Vanderbilt	W 61–57	11–17 (2–11)	Stegeman Coliseum (5,841); Athens, GA
March 1, 2009		at Arkansas	L 67–89	11–18 (2–12)	Bud Walton Arena (19,724); Fayetteville, AR
March 4, 2009		at Kentucky	W 90–85	12–18 (3–12)	Rupp Arena (23,889); Lexington, KY
March 7, 2009		South Carolina	L 51–68	12–19 (3–12)	Stegeman Coliseum (7,110); Athens, GA
SEC tournament
March 12, 2009	(E6)	vs. (W3) Mississippi State; First round	L 60–79	12–20	St. Pete Times Forum (12,152); Tampa, FL
*Non-conference game. ^{#}Rankings from AP Poll. (#) Tournament seedings in parentheses.
