= 2008–09 Auburn Tigers men's basketball team =

American college basketball season

2008–09 Auburn Tigers men's basketball

NIT, Quarterfinals
- Conference: Southeastern Conference
- West
- Record: 24–12 (10–6 SEC)
- Head coach: Jeff Lebo (5th season)
- Captains: Quantez Robertson; Korvotney Barber
- Home arena: Beard–Eaves–Memorial Coliseum

2008–09 Southeastern Conference men's basketball standings
	Conf.				Overall
Team	W		L	PCT	W		L	PCT
East
South Carolina	10	–	6	.625	21	–	10	.677
Tennessee	10	–	6	.625	21	–	13	.618
Florida	9	–	7	.563	25	–	11	.694
Vanderbilt	8	–	8	.500	19	–	12	.613
Kentucky	8	–	8	.500	22	–	14	.611
Georgia	3	–	13	.188	12	–	20	.375
West
No. 21 LSU	13	–	3	.813	27	–	8	.771
Auburn	10	–	6	.625	24	–	12	.667
Mississippi State†	9	–	7	.563	23	–	13	.639
Alabama	7	–	9	.438	18	–	14	.563
Ole Miss	7	–	9	.438	16	–	15	.516
Arkansas	2	–	14	.125	14	–	16	.467
† SEC Tournament winner Rankings from AP Poll

The 2008–09 Auburn Tigers men's basketball team represented Auburn University in the 2008–09 college basketball season. The team's head coach was Jeff Lebo, who was in his fifth season at Auburn. The team played their home games at Beard–Eaves–Memorial Coliseum in Auburn, Alabama. They finished the season 24–12, 10–6 in SEC play. They defeated Florida to advance to the semifinals of the SEC tournament where they lost to Tennessee. They received an invitation to the National Invitation Tournament, where they defeated UT Martin and Tulsa to advance to the quarterfinals where they lost to Baylor.

== Schedule and results ==
Date time, TV	Rank^{#}	Opponent^{#}	Result	Record	High points	High rebounds	High assists	Site (attendance) city, state
Exhibition
11/07/2008*; 7:00 pm		Morehouse	W 98–50		27 – Waller	10 – Tied	5 – Robertson	Beard–Eaves–Memorial Coliseum (2,500); Auburn, AL
Regular season
11/14/2008*; 7:00 pm		Missouri State	W 75–60	1–0	22 – Barber	7 – Robertson	5 – Hargrove	Beard–Eaves–Memorial Coliseum (5,169); Auburn, AL
11/19/2008*; 7:00 pm		Mercer; Chicago Invitational non-bracket game	L 74–78	1–1	22 – Waller	6 – Robertson	5 – Tied	Beard–Eaves–Memorial Coliseum (4,558); Auburn, AL
11/22/2008*; 1:00 pm		George Washington	W 83–71	2–1	19 – Waller	6 – Tied	4 – Tied	Beard–Eaves–Memorial Coliseum (3,332); Auburn, AL
11/25/2008*; 7:00 pm		Bethune–Cookman; Chicago Invitational non-bracket game	W 61–46	3–1	14 – Reed	8 – Robertson	5 – Hargrove	Beard–Eaves–Memorial Coliseum (3,254); Auburn, AL
11/28/2008*; 5:00 pm		vs. Dayton; Chicago Invitational semifinal	L 59–60 ^{OT}	3–2	22 – Reed	9 – Barber	6 – Robertson	Sears Centre (3,087); Hoffman Estates, IL
11/29/2008*; 4:30 pm		vs. Northern Iowa; Chicago Invitational 3rd place game	L 61–67	3–3	21 – Reed	10 – Barber	5 – Reed	Sears Centre; Hoffman Estates, IL
12/3/2008*; 7:00 pm, CBSCS		at No. 14 Xavier	L 74–81	3–4	23 – Sullivan	5 – Tied	7 – Reed	Cintas Center (9,648); Cincinnati, OH
12/6/2008*; 1:00 pm		Louisiana–Monroe	W 78–50	4–4	18 – Barber	6 – Tied	7 – Robertson	Beard–Eaves–Memorial Coliseum (3,368); Auburn, AL
12/17/2008*; 6:00 pm		Tuskegee	W 75–32	5–4	14 – Barber	10 – Lett	4 – Tied	Beard–Eaves–Memorial Coliseum (3,489); Auburn, AL
12/20/2008*; 3:00 pm, FSN		at Virginia	W 58–56	6–4	14 – Barber	10 – Barber	4 – Reed	John Paul Jones Arena (11,070); Charlottesville, VA
12/22/2008*; 7:00 pm		Alabama State	W 77–72	7–4	21 – Waller	10 – Barber	5 – Tied	Beard–Eaves–Memorial Coliseum (3,289); Auburn, AL
12/29/2008*; 7:00 pm, CSS		Alabama A&M	W 82–40	8–4	14 – Waller	9 – Hargrove	6 – Robertson	Beard–Eaves–Memorial Coliseum (4,002); Auburn, AL
12/31/2008*; 5:00 pm, CSS		Southeastern Louisiana	W 77–65	9–4	20 – Reed	16 – Barber	3 – Reed	Beard–Eaves–Memorial Coliseum (3,392); Auburn, AL
1/3/2009*; 5:00 pm, CSS		Tulane	W 78–53	10–4	20 – Reed	10 – Barber	4 – Reed	Beard–Eaves–Memorial Coliseum (4,970); Auburn, AL
1/10/2009; 6:00 pm		at South Carolina	L 56–68	10–5 (0–1)	21 – Reed	18 – Barber	4 – Robertson	Colonial Life Arena (11,725); Columbia, SC
1/14/2009; 7:00 pm, Raycom		Florida	L 65–68	10–6 (0–2)	15 – Barrett	8 – Hargrove	4 – Reed	Beard–Eaves–Memorial Coliseum (6,399); Auburn, AL
1/17/2009; 1:00 pm		Alabama; Iron Bowl of Basketball	W 85–71	11–6 (1–2)	22 – Waller	9 – Barber	7 – Robertson	Beard–Eaves–Memorial Coliseum (8,788); Auburn, AL
1/21/2009; 8:00 pm, Raycom		at Kentucky	L 64–73	11–7 (1–3)	22 – Reed	5 – Barber	2 – Tied	Rupp Arena (22,760); Lexington, KY
1/24/2009; 12:00 pm, Raycom		at Arkansas	W 73–51	12–7 (2–3)	16 – Reed	18 – Barber	6 – Reed	Bud Walton Arena (18,246); Fayetteville, AR
1/27/2009*; 7:00 pm		Texas–Pan American	W 66–63	13–7	14 – Reed	10 – Barber	6 – Reed	Beard–Eaves–Memorial Coliseum (3,283); Auburn, AL
1/31/2009; 1:00 pm		Vanderbilt	L 75–82	13–8 (2–4)	29 – Barrett	8 – Barber	7 – Robertson	Beard–Eaves–Memorial Coliseum (6,896); Auburn, AL
2/4/2009; 7:00 pm		at Ole Miss	L 59–78	13–9 (2–5)	17 – Barber	13 – Barber	5 – Reed	Tad Smith Coliseum (6,202); Oxford, MS
2/7/2009; 12:00 pm, Raycom		Tennessee	W 78–77	14–9 (3–5)	27 – Barrett	8 – Barber	3 – Reed	Beard–Eaves–Memorial Coliseum (6,321); Auburn, AL
2/11/2009; 7:00 pm		Arkansas	W 75–62	15–9 (4–5)	27 – Tied	11 – Barber	4 – Sullivan	Beard–Eaves–Memorial Coliseum (4,347); Auburn, AL
2/14/2009; 4:00 pm, FSN		Mississippi State	W 91–76	16–9 (5–5)	32 – Waller	9 – Waller	6 – Reed	Beard–Eaves–Memorial Coliseum (6,451); Auburn, AL
2/18/2009; 6:30 pm		at Georgia	W 71–59	17–9 (6–5)	20 – Waller	18 – Barber	5 – Reed	Stegeman Coliseum (6,707); Athens, GA
2/21/2009; 7:00 pm		at No. 23 LSU	L 72–79	17–10 (6–6)	19 – Barber	6 – Hargrove	3 – Tied	Pete Maravich Assembly Center (11,871); Baton Rouge, LA
2/25/2009; 7:00 pm		Ole Miss	W 77–64	18–10 (7–6)	19 – Reed	13 – Barber	3 – Tied	Beard–Eaves–Memorial Coliseum (5,357); Auburn, AL
2/28/2009; 7:00 pm, FSN		at Mississippi State	W 76–58	19–10 (8–6)	14 – Sullivan	6 – Barber	4 – Sullivan	Humphrey Coliseum (9,335); Starkville, MS
3/3/2009; 8:00 pm, ESPN		at Alabama; Iron Bowl of Basketball	W 77–73	20–10 (9–6)	15 – Barrett	17 – Barber	3 – Reed	Coleman Coliseum (13,265); Tuscaloosa, AL
3/7/2009; 3:00 pm, Raycom		No. 12 LSU	W 69–53	21–10 (10–6)	16 – Barber	17 – Barber	4 – Barber	Beard–Eaves–Memorial Coliseum (11,007); Auburn, AL
SEC tournament
3/13/2009; 8:45 pm, Raycom	(W2)	vs. (E3) Florida; Quarterfinals	W 61–58	22–10	12 – Tied	10 – Barber	4 – Robertson	St. Pete Times Forum (14,128); Tampa, FL
3/14/2009; 2:15 pm, ESPN2	(W2)	vs. (E1) Tennessee; Semifinals	L 85–94	22–11	24 – Barber	9 – Barber	8 – Reed	St. Pete Times Forum (10,387); Tampa, FL
NIT
3/18/2009; 7:00 pm	(1)	(8) UT Martin; First round	W 87–82	23–11	23 – Reed	8 – Barber	6 – Robertson	Beard–Eaves–Memorial Coliseum (4,008); Auburn, AL
3/20/2009; 7:00 pm	(1)	(4) Tulsa; Second round	W 74–55	24–11	17 – Barrett	6 – Hargrove	5 – Tied	Beard–Eaves–Memorial Coliseum (4,092); Auburn, AL
3/24/2009; 6:00 pm, ESPN	(1)	(3) Baylor; Quarterfinals	L 72–74	24–12	16 – Barrett	13 – Barber	5 – Robertson	Beard–Eaves–Memorial Coliseum (6,582); Auburn, AL
*Non-conference game. ^{#}Rankings from AP Poll. (#) Tournament seedings in parentheses. All times are in Central Time.
