= 2008–09 Alabama Crimson Tide men's basketball team =

American college basketball season

2008–09 Alabama Crimson Tide men's basketball
- Conference: Southeastern Conference
- Western Division
- Record: 18–14 (7–9 SEC)
- Head coach: Mark Gottfried (Resign Jan. 26th) (11th season); Philip Pearson (Interim)
- Assistant coaches: Philip Pearson; James Holland; Antoine Pettway
- Home arena: Coleman Coliseum (Capacity: 15,316)

2008–09 Southeastern Conference men's basketball standings
	Conf.				Overall
Team	W		L	PCT	W		L	PCT
East
South Carolina	10	–	6	.625	21	–	10	.677
Tennessee	10	–	6	.625	21	–	13	.618
Florida	9	–	7	.563	25	–	11	.694
Vanderbilt	8	–	8	.500	19	–	12	.613
Kentucky	8	–	8	.500	22	–	14	.611
Georgia	3	–	13	.188	12	–	20	.375
West
No. 21 LSU	13	–	3	.813	27	–	8	.771
Auburn	10	–	6	.625	24	–	12	.667
Mississippi State†	9	–	7	.563	23	–	13	.639
Alabama	7	–	9	.438	18	–	14	.563
Ole Miss	7	–	9	.438	16	–	15	.516
Arkansas	2	–	14	.125	14	–	16	.467
† SEC Tournament winner Rankings from AP Poll

The 2008–09 Alabama Crimson Tide men's basketball team (variously "Alabama", "UA", "Bama" or "The Tide") represented the University of Alabama in the 2008–09 college basketball season. The head coach was Mark Gottfried, who was in his eleventh year until his resignation January 26, 2009. Philip Pearson would be the interim for the remainder of the season. The team played its home games at Coleman Coliseum in Tuscaloosa, Alabama and was a member of the Southeastern Conference. This was the 96th season of basketball in the school's history. The Crimson Tide finished the season 18–14, 7–9 in SEC play, lost in the quarterfinals of the 2009 SEC men's basketball tournament and were not invited to a post season tournament.

== Schedule and results ==
Date time, TV	Rank^{#}	Opponent^{#}	Result	Record	Site (attendance) city, state
Exhibition
Nov. 6*; 7:00 p.m.		Faulkner	W 99–53		Coleman Coliseum (8,705); Tuscaloosa, AL
Nov. 13*; 7:00 p.m.		Belhaven	W 97–43		Coleman Coliseum (8,590); Tuscaloosa, AL
Non-conference regular season
Nov. 16*; 6:00 p.m.		Mercer	L 69–72	0–1	Coleman Coliseum (8,960); Tuscaloosa, AL
Nov. 19*; 8:00 p.m.		Florida A&M	W 89–48	1–1	Coleman Coliseum (8,853); Tuscaloosa, AL
Nov. 24*; 11:00 p.m., ESPN2		vs. Oregon; Maui Invitational Tournament	L 69–92	1–2	Lahaina Civic Center (2,500); Maui, Hawaii
Nov. 25*; 3:00 p.m., ESPN2		vs. Chaminade; Maui Invitational Tournament	W 78–56	2–2	Lahaina Civic Center (2,500); Maui, Hawaii
Nov. 26*; 1:00 p.m., ESPN2		vs. Saint Joseph's; Maui Invitational Tournament	W 58–48	3–2	Lahaina Civic Center (2,500); Maui, Hawaii
Dec. 7*; 12:00 p.m.		Alabama A&M	W 64–56	4–2	Coleman Coliseum (8,787); Tuscaloosa, AL
Dec. 7*; 7:00 p.m.		Louisiana–Lafayette	W 61–44	5–2	Coleman Coliseum (8,143); Tuscaloosa, AL
Dec. 13*; 7:00 p.m., CSS		Texas A&M	L 78–86 ^{OT}	5–3	Coleman Coliseum (9,316); Tuscaloosa, AL
Dec. 17*; 7:00 p.m.		Tennessee State	W 75–66	6–3	Coleman Coliseum (8,275); Tuscaloosa, AL
Dec. 22*; 6:00 p.m.		Chattanooga	W 82–63	7–3	Coleman Coliseum (8,511); Tuscaloosa, AL
Dec. 28*; 6:00 p.m.		Yale	W 66–63	8–3	Coleman Coliseum (8,814); Tuscaloosa, AL
Dec. 30*; 7:00 p.m.		Quincy	W 86–58	9–3	Coleman Coliseum (8,341); Tuscaloosa, AL
Jan 3*; 2:00 p.m.		Georgia Tech	W 88–77	10–3	Coleman Coliseum (9,988); Tuscaloosa, AL
Jan. 6*; 8:00 p.m., FSN		at No. 12 Clemson	L 59–66	10–4	Littlejohn Coliseum (10,000); Clemson, SC
SEC regular season
Jan. 11; 12:30 p.m., SEC Network		LSU	W 66–59	11–4 (1–0)	Coleman Coliseum (10,711); Tuscaloosa, AL]
Jan. 14; 7:00 p.m., CSS		at Mississippi State	L 74–83	11–5 (1–1)	Humphrey Coliseum (10,104); Starkville, MS
Jan. 17; 12:30 p.m., CSS		at Auburn; Iron Bowl of basketball	L 71–85	11–6 (1–2)	Beard-Eaves-Memorial Coliseum (8,788); Auburn, AL
Jan. 21; 7:00 p.m., SEC Network		Mississippi	W 76–73	12–6 (2–2)	Coleman Coliseum (10,267); Tuscaloosa, AL
Jan. 24; 2:00 p.m., SEC Network		Kentucky	L 51–61	12–7 (2–3)	Coleman Coliseum (15,316); Tuscaloosa, AL
Jan. 29; 8:00 p.m., ESPN		at Arkansas	L 80–89	12–8 (2–4)	Bud Walton Arena (17,083); Fayetteville, AR
Jan. 31; 6:00 p.m., SEC Network		Georgia	W 75–70	13–8 (3–4)	Coleman Coliseum (11,046); Tuscaloosa, AL
Feb. 5; 6:00 p.m., ESPN2		Vanderbilt	L 74–79	13–9 (3–5)	Memorial Gymnasium (13,850); Nashville, TN
Feb. 8; 12:00 p.m., SEC Network		at LSU	L 62–76	13–10 (3–6)	Maravich Center (10,578); Baton Rouge, Louisiana
Feb. 14; 2:00 p.m., SEC Network		South Carolina	L 73–75	13–11 (3–7)	Coleman Coliseum (10,224); Tuscaloosa, AL
Feb. 18; 6:00 p.m., SUN		at Florida	L 74–83	13–12 (3–8)	O'Connell Center (12,120); Gainesville, FL
Feb. 21; 2:00 p.m., SEC Network		Mississippi State	W 87–85 ^{2OT}	14–12 (4–8)	Coleman Coliseum (11,297); Tuscaloosa, AL
Feb. 25; 7:00 p.m., CSS		Arkansas	W 88–67	15–12 (5–8)	Coleman Coliseum (9,161); Tuscaloosa, AL
Feb. 28; 3:00 p.m., SEC Network		at Mississippi	W 90–69	16–12 (6–8)	Tad Smith Coliseum (7,862); Oxford, MS
Mar. 3; 8:00 p.m., ESPN		Auburn; Iron Bowl of basketball	L 73–77	16–13 (6–9)	Coleman Coliseum (13,265); Tuscaloosa, AL
Mar. 8; 11:00 a.m., CBS		at Tennessee	W 70–67	17–13 (7–9)	Thompson-Boling Arena (20,493); Knoxville, TN
SEC tournament
Mar. 12; 6:30 p.m., SEC Network	(W4)	vs. (E5) Vanderbilt; First Round	W 82–75	18–13	St. Pete Times Forum (12,152); Tampa, FL
Mar. 13; 6:30 p.m., SEC Network	(W4)	vs. (E1) Tennessee; Quarterfinals	L 62–86	18–14	St. Pete Times Forum (14,128); Tampa, FL
*Non-conference game. ^{#}Rankings from AP Poll. (#) Tournament seedings in parentheses. All times are in Central Time.

== See also ==
- 2009 NCAA Men's Division I Basketball Tournament
- 2008–09 NCAA Division I men's basketball season
- 2008–09 NCAA Division I men's basketball rankings
