= 2008–09 Vanderbilt Commodores men's basketball team =

American college basketball season

2008–09 Vanderbilt Commodores men's basketball
- Conference: Southeastern Conference
- Record: 19–12 (8–8 SEC)
- Head coach: Kevin Stallings
- Assistant coaches: Dan Muller; Tom Richardson; King Rice
- Home arena: Memorial Gymnasium

2008–09 Southeastern Conference men's basketball standings
	Conf.				Overall
Team	W		L	PCT	W		L	PCT
East
South Carolina	10	–	6	.625	21	–	10	.677
Tennessee	10	–	6	.625	21	–	13	.618
Florida	9	–	7	.563	25	–	11	.694
Vanderbilt	8	–	8	.500	19	–	12	.613
Kentucky	8	–	8	.500	22	–	14	.611
Georgia	3	–	13	.188	12	–	20	.375
West
No. 21 LSU	13	–	3	.813	27	–	8	.771
Auburn	10	–	6	.625	24	–	12	.667
Mississippi State†	9	–	7	.563	23	–	13	.639
Alabama	7	–	9	.438	18	–	14	.563
Ole Miss	7	–	9	.438	16	–	15	.516
Arkansas	2	–	14	.125	14	–	16	.467
† SEC Tournament winner Rankings from AP Poll

The 2008–09 Vanderbilt Commodores men's basketball team represented Vanderbilt University in the 2008–09 NCAA Division I men's college basketball season. The team competed in the East Division of the Southeastern Conference and finished with an overall record of 19–12 (SEC: 8–8). They were led by Kevin Stallings, in his ninth year as head coach, and played their home games at Memorial Gymnasium in Nashville, Tennessee. It was their sixth straight winning season, although they failed to play in a post-season tournament for the first time in five years.

The previous year's 2007–08 team finished 26–8 and ranked 25th in both the AP Poll and the ESPN/USA Today (Coaches) poll.

Entering the season, Vanderbilt was picked by the media attending the SEC's media days in October to finish 4th in the SEC East, behind Tennessee, Florida and Kentucky.

Vanderbilt lost three starters from the previous year's team—2008 SEC-player of the year swingman Shan Foster (20.3 ppg), shooting guard Alex (Red) Gordon (10.8 ppg) and power forward Ross Neltner (8.3 ppg) – and returned two starters—sophomore center A.J. Ogilvy and junior point guard Jermaine Beal. With no seniors and only two juniors (Beal and junior guard George Drake), the Commodores were one of the youngest team's in Division I.

Ogilvy, the Commodores' leading rebounder (6.7 rpg) and second leading scorer (17.0 ppg) the previous season, was selected by the SEC media and SEC coaches to the pre-season all-SEC first team.

== Roster ==
#	Name	Pos.	Height	Weight	Year	Hometown	High School	GP	Min	Ppg	Rpg	Apg
0	Jermaine Beal	G	6–3	210	Junior	DeSoto, TX	DeSoto	31	33.1	12.5	3.5	3.2
1	Brad Tinsley	G	6–3	180	Freshman	Oregon City, OR	Oregon City	31	31.0	11.0	2.5	2.8
2	Charles Hinkle	G/F	6–6	200	Freshman	Los Alamitos, CA	Hebron Academy (Maine)/Los Alamitos	25	8.4	2.0	0.9	0.4
3	Festus Ezeli	C	6–11	245	Freshman	Benin City, Nigeria	Igbinedion Education Center	29	12.4	3.8	2.6	0.0
4	Andrew (A.J.) Ogilvy	C	6–11	250	Sophomore	Sydney, Australia	Australian Institute of Sport, Canberra	29	27.6	15.4	7.1	1.3
5	Lance Goulbourne	G/F	6–7	215	Freshman	Brooklyn, NY	The Hun School	23	14.1	5.1	3.3	0.3
12	Jordan Smart^{2}	G/F	6–6	170	Freshman	Lexington, KY	Lexington Catholic	1	0.0	0.0	0.0	0.0
15	Elliott Cole^{2}	G	5–11	175	Sophomore	Memphis, TN	Memphis University School	10	1.7	0.3	0.1	0.0
21	Darshawn McClellan	F	6–7	220	Sophomore	Fresno, CA	Edison (Fresno)	31	16.9	2.1	3.0	1.1
22	Jamie Graham^{2}	G	5–11	180	Sophomore	Nashville, TN	Whites Creek	5	2.0	0.0	0.0	0.2
24	Andre Walker^{1}	F	6–7	214	Sophomore	Flossmoor, IL	Brewster Academy (N.H.)/Homewood-Flossmoor	3	23.7	4.7	4.7	1.3
33	Steve Tchiengang	F	6–8	240	Freshman	Douala, Cameroon	Montverde Academy/Cypress Community Christian	25	17.3	3.6	3.2	0.5
34	George Drake	G	6–4	210	Junior	Calera, AL	Calera	30	17.4	5.4	2.7	1.2
44	Jeffery Taylor	G-F	6–7	200	Freshman	Norrköping, Sweden	Hobbs High School, Hobbs, NM	31	26.0	12.2	6.2	1.7

^{1} Missed the season after torn ACL against MTSU. ^{2} Walk-on.

Source: ESPN.com

== 2008–09 schedule and results ==
Date time, TV	Rank^{#}	Opponent^{#}	Result	Record	Site (attendance) city, state
Exhibition
November 9*; 4:00 pm		Alabama-Huntsville	W 84–65		Memorial Gymnasium (11,655); Nashville, TN
Regular season
November 16*; 4:00 pm		Morehead State	W 74–48	1–0	Memorial Gymnasium (12,562); Nashville, TN
November 20*; 7:00 pm, FSN		Illinois	L 63–69	1–1	Memorial Gymnasium (12,630); Nashville, TN
November 24*; 7:00 pm, CSS		Middle Tennessee State	W 65–57	2–1	Memorial Gymnasium (12,502); Nashville, TN
November 26*; 7:00 pm		Central Arkansas; Cancun Challenge	W 83–62	3–1	Memorial Gymnasium (12,126); Nashville, TN
November 29*; 7:30 pm, CBSCS		vs. Drake; Cancun Challenge	W 72–57	4–1	Moon Palace Resort (275); Cancun, MX
November 30*; 9:30 pm, CBSCS		vs. VCU; Cancun Challenge	W 71–66	5–1	Moon Palace Resort (312); Cancun, MX
December 3*; 7:00 pm		Illinois-Chicago	L 55–74	5–2	Memorial Gymnasium (13,214); Nashville, TN
December 6*; 1:00 pm, FSN		at Georgia Tech	L 51–63	5–3	Alexander Memorial Coliseum (7,219); Atlanta, GA
December 10*; 7:00 pm, CSS		Alabama A&M	W 78–55	6–3	Memorial Gymnasium (12,662); Nashville, TN
December 16*; 6:00 pm, ESPN2		South Florida; Big East/SEC Challenge	W 71–52	7–3	Sommet Center (9,498); Nashville, TN
December 20*; 5:00 pm, CSS		Tennessee Tech	W 83–63	8–3	Memorial Gymnasium (12,700); Nashville, TN
December 22*; 8:00 pm, CSS		Furman	W 68–49	9–3	Memorial Gymnasium (11,961); Nashville, TN
December 31*; 11:00 am		Saint Francis (PA)	W 84–55	10–3	Memorial Gymnasium (12,496); Nashville, TN
January 3*; 4:00 pm, CBSCS		at Massachusetts	W 78–48	11–3	Mullins Center (5,698); Amherst, Massachusetts
January 10; 1:00 pm, LFS		at Kentucky	L 60–70	11–4 (0–1)	Rupp Arena (24,249); Lexington, KY
January 14; 7:00 pm		Georgia	W 50–40	12–4 (1–1)	Memorial Gymnasium (13,972); Nashville, TN
January 17; 7:00 pm, FSN		at Mississippi State	L 66–73	12–5 (1–2)	Humphrey Coliseum (9,268); Starkville, MS
January 20; 8:00 pm, ESPN		Tennessee; Super Tuesday	L 63–76	12–6 (1–3)	Memorial Gymnasium (14,057); Nashville, TN
January 25; 12:30 pm, CBS		No. 24 Florida	L 69–94	12–7 (1–4)	Memorial Gymnasium (13,993); Nashville, TN
January 28; 6:00 pm		at South Carolina	L 76–86	12–8 (1–5)	Colonial Life Arena (12,766); Columbia, SC
January 31; 1:00 pm		at Auburn	W 82–75	13–8 (2–5)	Beard–Eaves–Memorial Coliseum (6,896); Auburn, AL
February 5; 6:00 pm, ESPN2		Alabama	W 79–74	14–8 (3–5)	Memorial Gymnasium (13,850); Nashville, TN
February 7; 12:00 pm, CBS		Mississippi	W 71–61	15–8 (4–5)	Memorial Gymnasium (14,316); Nashville, TN
February 14; 2:00 pm, LFS		at Tennessee	L 50–69	15–9 (4–6)	Thompson–Boling Arena (20,375); Knoxville, TN
February 17; 8:00 pm, ESPN		Kentucky; Super Tuesday	W 77–64	16–9 (5–6)	Memorial Gymnasium (14,366); Nashville, TN
February 21; 2:00 pm, LFS		at Florida	L 68–82	16–10 (5–7)	O'Connell Center (12,543); Gainesville, FL
February 25; 6:30 pm		at Georgia	L 57–61	16–11 (5–8)	Stegeman Coliseum (5,841); Athens, GA
February 28; 8:00 pm, ESPNU		South Carolina	W 96–83	17–11 (6–8)	Memorial Gymnasium (13,963); Nashville, TN
March 4; 7:00 pm		at No. 12 LSU	W 75–67	18–11 (7–8)	Pete Maravich Assembly Center (13,249); Baton Rouge, LA
March 8; 1:00 pm, LFS		Arkansas	W 75–58	19–11 (8–8)	Memorial Gymnasium (14,316); Nashville, TN
SEC tournament
March 12; 6:30 pm, LFS		vs. Alabama; Round 1	L 75–82	19–12	St. Pete Times Forum (12,152); Tampa, FL
*Non-conference game. ^{#}Rankings from AP Poll. (#) Tournament seedings in parentheses. All times are in Central Time.
