= 2008–09 LSU Tigers basketball team =

American college basketball season

2008–09 LSU Tigers basketball

SEC regular season champions

NCAA tournament, second round
- Conference: Southeastern Conference

Ranking
- Coaches: No. 17
- AP: No. 21
- Record: 27–8 (13–3 SEC)
- Head coach: Trent Johnson (1st season)
- Home arena: Pete Maravich Assembly Center

2008–09 Southeastern Conference men's basketball standings
	Conf.				Overall
Team	W		L	PCT	W		L	PCT
East
South Carolina	10	–	6	.625	21	–	10	.677
Tennessee	10	–	6	.625	21	–	13	.618
Florida	9	–	7	.563	25	–	11	.694
Vanderbilt	8	–	8	.500	19	–	12	.613
Kentucky	8	–	8	.500	22	–	14	.611
Georgia	3	–	13	.188	12	–	20	.375
West
No. 21 LSU	13	–	3	.813	27	–	8	.771
Auburn	10	–	6	.625	24	–	12	.667
Mississippi State†	9	–	7	.563	23	–	13	.639
Alabama	7	–	9	.438	18	–	14	.563
Ole Miss	7	–	9	.438	16	–	15	.516
Arkansas	2	–	14	.125	14	–	16	.467
† SEC Tournament winner Rankings from AP Poll

The 2008-09 LSU Tigers men's basketball team represented Louisiana State University in the sport of basketball during the 2008-09 college basketball season. The Tigers competed in Division I of the National Collegiate Athletic Association (NCAA) and Southeastern Conference (SEC). They were led by 1st year head coach Trent Johnson, and played their home games at the Pete Maravich Assembly Center on the university's Baton Rouge, Louisiana campus.

== Recruiting class ==
College recruiting information
Name	Hometown	School	Height	Weight	Commit date
Chris Bass; PG	Lee, Maine	Lee Academy	6 ft 1 in (1.85 m)	170 lb (77 kg)	Jun 13, 2008
Chris Bass; PG	Recruit ratings: Scout: Rivals: (76)				
Delwan Graham; PF	Dunwoody, Georgia	Dunwoody High School	6 ft 8 in (2.03 m)	215 lb (98 kg)	Sep 19, 2007
Delwan Graham; PF	Recruit ratings: Scout: Rivals: (89)				
Dennis Harris; PF	Jonesboro, Georgia	Mundy's Hill High School	6 ft 10 in (2.08 m)	195 lb (88 kg)	Sep 12, 2007
Dennis Harris; PF	Recruit ratings: Scout: Rivals: (76)				
Storm Warren; PF	Monroe, Louisiana	Richwood High School	6 ft 8 in (2.03 m)	215 lb (98 kg)	Nov 9, 2007
Storm Warren; PF	Recruit ratings: Scout: Rivals: (95)				
Overall recruit ranking: Scout: Not Ranked Rivals: Not Ranked
Note: In many cases, Scout, Rivals, 247Sports, On3, and ESPN may conflict in their listings of height and weight.; In these cases, the average was taken. ESPN grades are on a 100-point scale.; Sources: "LSU Commit List for 2008". Rivals.; "Men's Basketball Recruiting". Scout.; "College Basketball Recruiting Schools". ESPN.; "Scout.com Team Recruiting Rankings". Scout.; "2008 Team Ranking". Rivals.

== Roster ==
2008–09 LSU Tigers men's basketball team
Players
Coaches

Pos.	#	Name	Height	Weight	Year	Hometown
G	4	Chris Bass	6 ft 0 in (1.83 m)	180 lb (82 kg)	Fr	Baton Rouge, Louisiana
G	30	Alex Farrer	6 ft 5 in (1.96 m)	205 lb (93 kg)	Jr	Phoenix, Arizona
F	2	Delwan Graham	6 ft 5 in (1.96 m)	215 lb (98 kg)	Fr	Atlanta
F	3	Garrett Green	6 ft 10 in (2.08 m)	235 lb (107 kg)	RS So	Woodland Hills, California
F	15	Dennis Harris	6 ft 10 in (2.08 m)	—	RS Fr	Jonesboro, California
C	21	Chris Johnson	6 ft 11 in (2.11 m)	210 lb (95 kg)	RS Sr	Montross, Virginia
F	20	Zach Kinsley	6 ft 5 in (1.96 m)	200 lb (91 kg)	Fr	Baton Rouge, Louisiana
G	13	Terry Martin	6 ft 6 in (1.98 m)	210 lb (95 kg)	Sr	Monroe, Louisiana
F	1	Tasmin Mitchell	6 ft 7 in (2.01 m)	235 lb (107 kg)	Jr	Denham Springs, Louisiana
G	11	Bo Spencer	6 ft 1 in (1.85 m)	185 lb (84 kg)	So	Baton Rouge, Louisiana
F	5	Malcolm White	6 ft 9 in (2.06 m)	225 lb (102 kg)	Jr	Baton Rouge, Louisiana
G	10	Daron Populist	5 ft 10 in (1.78 m)	170 lb (77 kg)	Fr	Slidell, Louisiana
G	14	Garrett Temple	6 ft 6 in (1.98 m)	190 lb (86 kg)	Sr	Baton Rouge, Louisiana
G	5	Marcus Thornton	6 ft 4 in (1.93 m)	205 lb (93 kg)	Sr	Baton Rouge, Louisiana
F	32	Quintin Thornton	6 ft 9 in (2.06 m)	240 lb (109 kg)	Sr	Orlando, Florida
F	24	Storm Warren	6 ft 7 in (2.01 m)	220 lb (100 kg)	Fr	Monroe, Louisiana

Head coach

- Trent Johnson (Boise State)

Assistant coach(es)

{{{asst_coach}}}

Legend

- (C) Team captain
- (S) Suspended
- (I) Ineligible
- (W) Walk-on
- Injured
- Current redshirt

Roster
Last update: 2011-07-11

== Schedule ==
Date time, TV	Rank^{#}	Opponent^{#}	Result	Record	Site (attendance) city, state
Regular season
2008/11/15*; 1:00 p.m.		Jackson State	W 79–65	1–0	Maravich Center (11,511); Baton Rouge, Louisiana
2008/11/20*; 7:00 p.m.		Alcorn State; LSU Invitational	W 77–45	2–0	Maravich Center (8,475); Baton Rouge, Louisiana
2008/11/23*; 2:00 p.m.		Northwestern State; LSU Invitational	W 91–60	3–0	Maravich Center (8,322); Baton Rouge, Louisiana
2008/11/28*; 7:00 p.m.		Centenary; LSU Invitational	W 64–58	4–0	Maravich Center (8,419); Baton Rouge, Louisiana
2008/11/30*; 6:00 p.m.		Troy	W 92–57	5–0	Maravich Center (7,804); Baton Rouge, Louisiana
2008/12/2*; 7:00 p.m., FSN		Cal State Fullerton	W 84–63	6–0	Maravich Center (9,043); Baton Rouge, Louisiana
2008/12/13*; 7:00 p.m.		Grambling State	W 87–41	7–0	Maravich Center (8,340); Baton Rouge, Louisiana
2008/12/17*; 7:00 p.m., CST		Nicholls State	W 68–56	8–0	Maravich Center (8,284); Baton Rouge, Louisiana
2008/12/20*; 4:00 p.m.		at Texas A&M	L 61–72	8–1	Toyota Center (17,074); Houston, Texas
2008/12/22*; 7:00 p.m., CST		McNeese State	W 62–59	9–1	Maravich Center (8,604); Baton Rouge, Louisiana
2008/12/27*; 1:00 p.m., ESPN2		Washington State	W 64–52	10–1	Maravich Center (10,585); Baton Rouge, Louisiana
2008/12/31*; 1:30 p.m., CST		Louisiana-Lafayette	W 81–79	11–1	Maravich Center (9,030); Baton Rouge, Louisiana
2009/1/03*; 7:00 p.m.		Southeastern Louisiana	W 90–61	12–1	Maravich Center (9,310); Baton Rouge, Louisiana
2009/1/06*; 8:00 p.m.		at Utah	L 61–91	12–2	Jon M. Huntsman Center (9,170); Salt Lake City
2009/1/11; 12:30 p.m., LFS		at Alabama	L 59–65	12–3 (0–1)	Coleman Coliseum (10,711); Tuscaloosa, Alabama
2009/1/14; 7:00 p.m., CST		South Carolina	W 85–68	13–3 (1–1)	Maravich Center (11,393); Baton Rouge, Louisiana
2009/1/17; 3:00 p.m., LFS		at Mississippi	W 83–51	14–3 (2–1)	Tad Smith Coliseum (7,674); Oxford, Mississippi
2009/1/21; 7:00 p.m.		Mississippi State	W 81–57	15–3 (3–1)	Maravich Center (11,709); Baton Rouge, Louisiana
2009/1/24*; 7:00 p.m., ESPN2		No. 15 Xavier	L 70–80	15–4	Maravich Center (13,839); Baton Rouge, Louisiana
2009/1/28; 7:00 p.m., LFS		at Tennessee	W 79–73	16–4 (4–1)	Thompson–Boling Arena (18,526); Knoxville, Tennessee
2009/1/31; 4:00 p.m., FSN		Arkansas	W 79–69	17–4 (5–1)	Maravich Center (12,698); Baton Rouge, Louisiana
2009/2/4; 6:30 p.m.		at Georgia	W 80–62	18–4 (6–1)	Stegeman Coliseum (6,659); Athens, Georgia
2009/2/8; 12:00 p.m., LFS		Alabama	W 76–62	19–4 (7–1)	Maravich Center (10,578); Baton Rouge, Louisiana
2009/2/11; 7:00 p.m.		at Mississippi State	W 97–94	20–4 (8–1)	Humphrey Coliseum (9,226); Starkville, Mississippi
2009/2/14; 6:00 p.m., FSN		Mississippi	W 73–66	21–4 (9–1)	Maravich Center (11,425); Baton Rouge, Louisiana
2009/2/18; 7:00 p.m.	No. 23	at Arkansas	W 72–69	22–4 (10–1)	Bud Walton Arena (16,079); Fayetteville, Arkansas
2009/2/21; 7:00 p.m.	No. 23	Auburn	W 79–72	23–4 (11–1)	Maravich Center (11,871); Baton Rouge, Louisiana
2009/2/24; 8:00 p.m., ESPN	No. 18	Florida	W 81–75	24–4 (12–1)	Maravich Center (13,345); Baton Rouge, Louisiana
2009/2/28; 3:00 p.m., CBS	No. 18	at Kentucky	W 73–70	25–4 (13–1)	Rupp Arena (24,411); Lexington, Kentucky
2009/3/4; 7:00 p.m., CST	No. 12	Vanderbilt	L 67–75	25–5 (13–2)	Maravich Center (13,249); Baton Rouge, Louisiana
2009/3/7; 3:00 p.m., LFS	No. 12	at Auburn	L 53–69	25–6 (13–3)	Beard-Eaves-Memorial Coliseum (11,007); Auburn, Alabama
SEC Tournament
2009/03/13; 12:00 p.m., LFS	No. 20	vs. Kentucky; SEC Conference tournament	W 67–58	26–6	St. Petersburg Times Forum (13,306); Tampa, Florida
2009/03/14; 12:00 p.m., ESPN2	No. 20	vs. Mississippi State; SEC Conference tournament	L 57–67	26–7	St. Petersburg Times Forum (10,387); Tampa, Florida
NCAA Tournament
2009/03/19; 11:20 a.m., CBS	No. 21 (8)	vs. No. 22 (9) Butler; First Round	W 75–71	27–7	Greensboro Coliseum (20,226); Greensboro, North Carolina
2009/03/21; 4:45 p.m., CBS	No. 21 (8)	vs. No. 2 (1) North Carolina; Second Round	L 70–84	27–8	Greensboro Coliseum (22,479); Greensboro, North Carolina
*Non-conference game. ^{#}Rankings from AP poll, NCAA tournament seeds shown in parentheses. (#) Tournament seedings in parentheses. All times are in Central Standard Time.
