= 2008–09 Mississippi State Bulldogs basketball team =

American college basketball season

2008–09 Mississippi State Bulldogs men's basketball

SEC tournament champions

NCAA tournament, Round of 64
- Conference: Southeastern Conference
- Record: 23–13 (9–7 SEC)
- Head coach: Rick Stansbury (11th season)
- Assistant coaches: Phil Cunningham; Marcus Grant; Robert Kirby
- Home arena: Humphrey Coliseum

2008–09 Southeastern Conference men's basketball standings
	Conf.				Overall
Team	W		L	PCT	W		L	PCT
East
South Carolina	10	–	6	.625	21	–	10	.677
Tennessee	10	–	6	.625	21	–	13	.618
Florida	9	–	7	.563	25	–	11	.694
Vanderbilt	8	–	8	.500	19	–	12	.613
Kentucky	8	–	8	.500	22	–	14	.611
Georgia	3	–	13	.188	12	–	20	.375
West
No. 21 LSU	13	–	3	.813	27	–	8	.771
Auburn	10	–	6	.625	24	–	12	.667
Mississippi State†	9	–	7	.563	23	–	13	.639
Alabama	7	–	9	.438	18	–	14	.563
Ole Miss	7	–	9	.438	16	–	15	.516
Arkansas	2	–	14	.125	14	–	16	.467
† SEC Tournament winner Rankings from AP Poll

The 2008–09 Mississippi State basketball team represented Mississippi State University in the 2008–09 college basketball season. Under head coach Rick Stansbury, the team played their home games at Humphrey Coliseum in Starkville, Mississippi, and was a member of the Southeastern Conference.

== Previous season ==
The 2007–08 Bulldogs finished the season 23–11 (12–4 in SEC play) and reached the Round of 32 in the NCAA tournament, where they barely lost to eventual runner-up Memphis.

== Before the season ==
=== Departures ===
Five players from the 2007–08 team did not return for this season.

Name	Number	Pos.	Height	Weight	Year	Hometown	Notes
Billy Begley	3	Guard	6'1"	190	Senior	Henderson, KY	Graduated (Walk-on)
Jamont Gordon	44	Guard	6'4"	230	Junior	Nashville, TN	Declared for 2008 NBA draft
Joseph Iupe	10	Guard	6'1"	160	Sophomore	Madison, MS	Left team (Walk-on)
Ben Hansbrough	11	Guard	6'3"	205	Sophomore	Poplar Bluff, MO	Transferred to Notre Dame
Charles Rhodes	23	Forward	6'8"	245	Senior	Jackson, MS	Graduated

=== Recruits ===
College recruiting information
Name	Hometown	School	Height	Weight	Commit date
Twany Beckham; PG	Louisville, KY	Ballard HS	6 ft 5 in (1.96 m)	180 lb (82 kg)	Apr 13, 2008
Twany Beckham; PG	Recruit ratings: Scout: Rivals:				
Dee Bost; PG	Concord, NC	Concord HS	6 ft 1 in (1.85 m)	17 lb (7.7 kg)	Jul 11, 2007
Dee Bost; PG	Recruit ratings: Scout: Rivals:				
Jacquiese Holcombe; F	College Park, GA	Georgia Perimeter College	6 ft 7 in (2.01 m)	205 lb (93 kg)	May 5, 2008
Jacquiese Holcombe; F	Recruit ratings: Scout: Rivals:				
Romero Osby; PF	Meridian, MS	Northeast Lauderdale HS	6 ft 8 in (2.03 m)	230 lb (100 kg)	Jun 18, 2007
Romero Osby; PF	Recruit ratings: Scout: Rivals:				
Overall recruit ranking:
Note: In many cases, Scout, Rivals, 247Sports, On3, and ESPN may conflict in their listings of height and weight.; In these cases, the average was taken. ESPN grades are on a 100-point scale.; Sources: "Mississippi State 2008 Basketball Commitments". Rivals.; "2008 Mississippi State Basketball Commits". Scout.; "ESPN". ESPN.; "Scout.com Team Recruiting Rankings". Scout.; "2008 Team Ranking". Rivals.

== Roster ==
2008–09 Mississippi State Bulldogs men's basketball team
Players
Coaches

Pos.	#	Name	Height	Weight	Year	Previous school	Hometown
F	1	Jacquiese Holcombe (injured) (redshirt)	6 ft 6 in (1.98 m)	205 lb (93 kg)	Jr	Georgia Perimeter College	College Park, GA
G	2	Ravern Johnson	6 ft 7 in (2.01 m)	175 lb (79 kg)	So	Coahoma County HS	Lyon, MS
G	3	Dee Bost	6 ft 2 in (1.88 m)	170 lb (77 kg)	Fr	Concord HS	Concord, NC
G	4	Twany Beckham	6 ft 5 in (1.96 m)	190 lb (86 kg)	Fr	Ballard HS	Louisville, KY
F	5	Romero Osby	6 ft 8 in (2.03 m)	230 lb (104 kg)	Fr	Northeast Lauderdale HS	Meridian, MS
G	10	Christopher Gay (W)	6 ft 0 in (1.83 m)	180 lb (82 kg)	RS Sr	William Carey College	Hattiesburg, MS
G	14	Rod Bryant (W)	6 ft 1 in (1.85 m)	165 lb (75 kg)	So	G. W. Carver HS	Birmingham, AL
G	15	Riley Benock	6 ft 4 in (1.93 m)	180 lb (82 kg)	So	Meade County HS	Battletown, KY
F	20	Taylor Luczak (W)	6 ft 8 in (2.03 m)	220 lb (100 kg)	RS Fr	Glens Falls HS	Glens Falls, NY
G	22	Barry Stewart	6 ft 2 in (1.88 m)	170 lb (77 kg)	Jr	Shelbyville Central HS	Shelbyville, TN
F	24	Kodi Augustus	6 ft 8 in (2.03 m)	220 lb (100 kg)	So	Maine Central Institute	Baton Rouge, LA
G	25	Phil Turner	6 ft 3 in (1.91 m)	170 lb (77 kg)	RS So	Grenada HS	Grenada, MS
F	32	Jarvis Varnado	6 ft 9 in (2.06 m)	210 lb (95 kg)	Jr	Haywood HS	Brownsville, TN
G	33	Brandon Bolen (W)	6 ft 3 in (1.91 m)	195 lb (88 kg)	So	Madison-Ridgeland Academy	Madison, MS
F	44	Brian Johnson	6 ft 9 in (2.06 m)	245 lb (111 kg)	Sr	Bishop O'Connell HS	Laurinburg, NC
F	45	Elgin Bailey	6 ft 8 in (2.03 m)	265 lb (120 kg)	So	Belaire HS	New Orleans, LA

Head coach

- Rick Stansbury (Campbellsville)

Assistant coach(es)

- Phil Cunningham (Campbellsville)
- Marcus Grant (Mississippi State)
- Robert Kirby (UTPA)

Legend

- (C) Team captain
- (S) Suspended
- (I) Ineligible
- (W) Walk-on
- Injured
- Current redshirt

Roster
