= 2009 SEC men's basketball tournament =

- Classification: Division I
- Season: 2008–09
- Teams: 12
- Site: St. Pete Times Forum; Tampa, Florida
- Champions: Mississippi State (3rd title)
- Winning coach: Rick Stansbury (2nd title)
- Television: Raycom Sports, CBS

2008–09 Southeastern Conference men's basketball standings
	Conf.				Overall
Team	W		L	PCT	W		L	PCT
East
South Carolina	10	–	6	.625	21	–	10	.677
Tennessee	10	–	6	.625	21	–	13	.618
Florida	9	–	7	.563	25	–	11	.694
Vanderbilt	8	–	8	.500	19	–	12	.613
Kentucky	8	–	8	.500	22	–	14	.611
Georgia	3	–	13	.188	12	–	20	.375
West
No. 21 LSU	13	–	3	.813	27	–	8	.771
Auburn	10	–	6	.625	24	–	12	.667
Mississippi State†	9	–	7	.563	23	–	13	.639
Alabama	7	–	9	.438	18	–	14	.563
Ole Miss	7	–	9	.438	16	–	15	.516
Arkansas	2	–	14	.125	14	–	16	.467
† SEC Tournament winner Rankings from AP Poll

The 2009 SEC men's basketball tournament took place on March 12–15, 2009 in Tampa, Florida at the St. Pete Times Forum (now known as the Benchmark International Arena).

== Television coverage ==
The first, quarterfinal, and semifinal rounds were televised by Raycom Sports; the semifinal round marked Raycom's final SEC Basketball telecast. The SEC Championship Game was aired nationwide on CBS.

== SEC Regular Season Standings and Awards ==
=== Standings ===
SEC East
School	Coach	W	L	Seed
Tennessee	Bruce Pearl	10	6	E1
South Carolina	Darrin Horn	10	6	E2
Florida	Billy Donovan	9	7	E3
Kentucky	Billy Gillispie	8	8	E4
Vanderbilt	Kevin Stallings	8	8	E5
Georgia	Pete Herrmann	3	13	E6
SEC West
School	Coach	W	L	Seed
LSU	Trent Johnson	13	3	W1
Auburn	Jeff Lebo	10	6	W2
Mississippi State	Rick Stansbury	9	7	W3
Alabama	Philip Pearson	7	9	W4
Mississippi	Andy Kennedy	7	9	W5
Arkansas	John Pelphrey	2	14	W6

=== Awards ===
Award	Recipient	Class	Team
SEC Player of the Year (Media)
SEC Player of the Year (Coaches)	Marcus Thornton	Sr.	LSU
SEC Coach of the Year (Media)
SEC Coach of the Year (Coaches)	Trent Johnson	1st year	LSU
SEC Freshman of the Year (Media)
SEC Freshman of the Year (Coaches)	Terrico White	Fr.	Ole Miss
SEC Defensive Player of the Year (Media)	Jarvis Varnado	Jr.	Mississippi State
SEC Defensive Player of the Year (Coaches)	Jarvis Varnado	Jr.	Mississippi State
SEC Sixth Man (Coaches)	Brandis Raley-Ross	Sr.	South Carolina
SEC Awards

==== All-Conference Team ====
All-SEC First Team

Position	Player	Class	Team
G	Nick Calathes	So.	Florida
G	Jodie Meeks	Jr.	Kentucky
G	Devan Downey	Jr.	South Carolina
G	Marcus Thornton	Sr.	LSU
F	Tyler Smith	Jr.	Tennessee
F	Tasmin Mitchell	Jr.	LSU
F	Patrick Patterson	So.	Kentucky
F	Jarvis Varnado	Jr.	Mississippi State
SEC First Team

== Bracket ==
First round March 12
W5	Ole Miss	58
E4	Kentucky	71
E6	Georgia	60
W3	Mississippi State	79
E5	Vanderbilt	75
W4	Alabama	82
W6	Arkansas	58
E3	Florida	73

Second round March 13
E4	Kentucky	58
W1	#20 LSU	67
E2	South Carolina	68
W3	Mississippi State	82
W4	Alabama	62
E1	Tennessee	86
W2	Auburn	61
E3	Florida	58

Semifinals; March 14
W1	#20 LSU	57
W3	Mississippi State	67
E1	Tennessee	94
W2	Auburn	85

SEC Championship Game; March 15
W3	Mississippi State	64
E1	Tennessee	61
