= 2008–09 Florida Gators men's basketball team =

American college basketball season

2008–09 Florida Gators men's basketball

National Invitation Tournament, Quarterfinals
- Conference: Southeastern Conference
- East
- Record: 25–11 (9–7 SEC)
- Head coach: Billy Donovan
- Assistant coach: Larry Shyatt; Shaka Smart; Rob Lanier
- Home arena: O'Connell Center

2008–09 Southeastern Conference men's basketball standings
	Conf.				Overall
Team	W		L	PCT	W		L	PCT
East
South Carolina	10	–	6	.625	21	–	10	.677
Tennessee	10	–	6	.625	21	–	13	.618
Florida	9	–	7	.563	25	–	11	.694
Vanderbilt	8	–	8	.500	19	–	12	.613
Kentucky	8	–	8	.500	22	–	14	.611
Georgia	3	–	13	.188	12	–	20	.375
West
No. 21 LSU	13	–	3	.813	27	–	8	.771
Auburn	10	–	6	.625	24	–	12	.667
Mississippi State†	9	–	7	.563	23	–	13	.639
Alabama	7	–	9	.438	18	–	14	.563
Ole Miss	7	–	9	.438	16	–	15	.516
Arkansas	2	–	14	.125	14	–	16	.467
† SEC Tournament winner Rankings from AP Poll

The 2008–09 Florida Gators men's basketball team represented the University of Florida in the sport of basketball during the 2008–09 college basketball season. The Gators competed in Division I of the National Collegiate Athletic Association (NCAA) and the Eastern Division of the Southeastern Conference (SEC). They were led by head coach Billy Donovan, and played their home games in the O'Connell Center on the university's Gainesville, Florida campus. The Gators were looking to build on their 24–12 record from the 2007–08 season.

== Preseason ==
Entering the season, the Gators had to overcome the loss of Marreese Speights, who left for the 2008 NBA draft after his sophomore season with the Gators. (Speights was selected in the draft by the Philadelphia 76ers.) To replace him, the Gators added six freshmen to the team. The Gators won their two preseason games against Rollins and Warner.

=== Class of 2008 ===
College recruiting
Name	Hometown	School	Height	Weight	Commit date
Allan Chaney; PF	New London, Connecticut	New London HS	6 ft 8 in (2.03 m)	220 lb (100 kg)	Aug 23, 2007
Allan Chaney; PF	Recruit ratings: Scout: Rivals: (95)				
Kenny Kadji; C	Douala, Cameroon	IMG Academy	6 ft 10 in (2.08 m)	225 lb (102 kg)	Jun 30, 2007
Kenny Kadji; C	Recruit ratings: Scout: Rivals: (96)				
Ray Shipman; SF	Pace, Florida	Pace HS	6 ft 5 in (1.96 m)	204 lb (93 kg)	Jun 21, 2007
Ray Shipman; SF	Recruit ratings: Scout: Rivals: (96)				
Eloy Vargas; PF	Moca, Dominican Republic	American Heritage School	6 ft 9 in (2.06 m)	220 lb (100 kg)	Sep 26, 2007
Eloy Vargas; PF	Recruit ratings: Scout: Rivals: (96)				
Erving Walker; PG	Middle Village, New York	Christ The King Regional HS	5 ft 8 in (1.73 m)	140 lb (64 kg)	Dec 29, 2006
Erving Walker; PG	Recruit ratings: Scout: Rivals: (93)				
Overall Recruiting Rankings: Scout – 9 Rivals – 10 ESPN – 2

== Roster ==
Name	Number	Position	Height	Weight	Class	Hometown
Adam Allen	14	F	6–8	225	Sophomore	Milton, Florida
Nick Calathes	33	G/F	6–6	194	Sophomore	Winter Park, Florida
Allan Chaney	24	F	6–8	231	Freshman	Baltimore, Maryland
Hudson Fricke	40	G	6–1	193	Sophomore	Greenville, South Carolina
Walter Hodge	15	G	6–0	170	Senior	Guaynabo, Puerto Rico
Kenny Kadji	30	F/C	6–10	235	Freshmen	Douala, Cameroon
Vernon Macklin	32	F	6–10	230	Junior	Portsmouth, Virginia
Kyle McClanahan	4	G	6–1	185	Freshman	Maitland, Florida
Chandler Parsons	25	F	6–9	213	Sophomore	Winter Park, Florida
Ray Shipman	3	G/F	6–5	212	Freshman	Miramar, Florida
Alex Tyus	23	F	6–8	220	Sophomore	St. Louis, Missouri
Eloy Vargas	1	F/C	6–10	215	Freshman	Moca, Dominican Republic
Erving Walker	11	G	5–8	161	Freshman	Brooklyn, New York
Dan Werner	21	F	6–7	230	Junior	Middletown, New Jersey

=== Coaches ===
Name	Type	College	Graduating year
Billy Donovan	Head coach	Providence College	1987
Larry Shyatt	Associate Head Coach	College of Wooster	1973
Shaka Smart	Assistant coach	Kenyon College	1999
Rob Lanier	Assistant coach	St. Bonaventure University	1990
Darren Hertz	Assistant to the Head Coach	Florida	1997
Adam Beaupre	Video Coordinator	Florida	1999
Matt Herring	Strength & Conditioning Coordinator	University of Texas Southwestern	1994
Dave Werner	Athletic Trainer	Eastern Kentucky University	1991
Tom Williams	Academic Counselor	Florida	1978

After the season, assistant coach Shaka Smart left to become head coach of the VCU Rams.

== Schedule and results ==
Retrieved from Gatorzone.com

Date time, TV	Rank^{#}	Opponent^{#}	Result	Record	Site city, state
Exhibition games
November 3, 2008*; 7:00 pm	No. 19	Warner	W 108–49		O'Connell Center; Gainesville, FL
November 6, 2008*; 7:00 pm	No. 19	Rollins	W 82–53		O'Connell Center; Gainesville, FL
Regular Season
November 14, 2008*; 6:00 pm, ESPNU	No. 19	Toledo	W 80–58	1–0	O'Connell Center; Gainesville, FL
November 16, 2008*; 2:15 pm, ESPNU	No. 19	Bradley	W 81–58	2–0	O'Connell Center; Gainesville, FL
November 20, 2008*; 8:00 pm, SUN	No. 18	Southern Utah	W 64–50	3–0	O'Connell Center; Gainesville, FL
November 24, 2008*; 7:30 pm, ESPN2	No. 17	vs. Syracuse; CBE Classic Semifinal	L 83–89	3–1	Sprint Center; Kansas City, MO
November 25, 2008*; 7:45 pm, ESPNU	No. 17	vs. Washington; CBE Classic Consolation Game	W 86–84	4–1	Sprint Center; Kansas City, MO
November 30, 2008*; 1:00 pm, SUN	No. 17	vs. Missouri-Kansas City	W 86–65	5–1	Amway Arena; Orlando, FL
December 2, 2008*; 7:00 pm, SUN	No. 23	Florida A&M	W 73–58	6–1	O'Connell Center; Gainesville, FL
December 7, 2008*; 6:00 pm, FSN	No. 23	at Florida State	L 55–57	6–2	Donald L. Tucker Center; Tallahassee, FL
December 10, 2008*; 8:00 pm, FSN		Florida Gulf Coast	W 94–60	7–2	O'Connell Center; Gainesville, FL
December 20, 2008*; 6:30 pm, FSN		vs. UCF	W 89–61	8–2	Veterans Memorial Arena; Jacksonville, FL
December 22, 2008*; 7:00 pm, FSN		Georgia Southern	W 88–81	9–2	O'Connell Center; Gainesville, FL
December 28, 2008*; 6:30 pm, FSN		vs. Winthrop; Orange Bowl Basketball Classic	W 74–45	10–2	BankAtlantic Center; Sunrise, FL
December 30, 2008*; 1:00 pm, FSN		Stetson	W 78–57	11–2	O'Connell Center; Gainesville, FL
January 3, 2009*; 4:00 pm, CBS		NC State	W 68–66	12–2	O'Connell Center; Gainesville, FL
January 6, 2009*; 7:00 pm, SUN		Longwood	W 95–69	13–2	O'Connell Center; Gainesville, FL
January 10, 2009; 6:00 pm, FSN		Ole Miss	W 78–68	14–2 (1–0)	O'Connell Center; Gainesville, FL
January 14, 2009; 8:00 pm, Raycom		at Auburn	W 68–65	15–2 (2–0)	Beard-Eaves-Memorial Coliseum; Auburn, AL
January 17, 2009; 2:00 pm, Raycom		Arkansas	W 80–65	16–2 (3–0)	O'Connell Center; Gainesville, FL
January 21, 2009; 7:00 pm, Raycom	No. 24	at South Carolina	L 69–70	16–3 (3–1)	Colonial Life Arena; Columbia, SC
January 25, 2009; 1:30 pm, CBS	No. 24	at Vanderbilt	W 94–69	17–3 (4–1)	Nashville, TN; Memorial Gymnasium
January 28, 2009; 8:00 pm, Raycom		Georgia	W 83–57	18–3 (5–1)	O'Connell Center; Gainesville, FL
January 31, 2009; 9:00 pm, ESPN		at Tennessee; ESPN College GameDay	L 63–79	18–4 (5–2)	Thompson-Boling Arena; Knoxville, TN
February 3, 2009; 9:00 pm, ESPN		South Carolina	W 97–93	19–4 (6–2)	O'Connell Center; Gainesville, FL
February 10, 2009; 9:00 pm, ESPN		at Kentucky	L 65–68	19–5 (6–3)	Rupp Arena; Lexington, KY
February 14, 2009; 3:30 pm, ABC		at Georgia	L 86–88	19–6 (6–4)	Stegeman Coliseum; Athens, Georgia
February 18, 2009; 7:00 pm, SUN		Alabama	W 83–74	20–6 (7–4)	O'Connell Center; Gainesville, FL
February 21, 2009; 3:00 pm, Raycom		Vanderbilt	W 82–68	21–6 (8–4)	O'Connell Center; Gainesville, FL
February 24, 2009; 9:00 pm, ESPN		at LSU	L 75–81	21–7 (8–5)	Pete Maravich Assembly Center; Baton Rouge, LA
March 1, 2009; 2:00 pm, CBS		Tennessee	L 75–79	21–8 (8–6)	O'Connell Center; Gainesville, FL
March 4, 2009; 8:00 pm, Raycom		at Mississippi State	L 71–80	21–9 (8–7)	Humphrey Coliseum; Starkville, MS
March 7, 2009; 2:00 pm, CBS		Kentucky	W 60–53	22–9 (9–7)	O'Connell Center; Gainesville, FL
SEC Tournament
March 12, 2009; 9:45 pm, Raycom		vs. Arkansas; SEC Championship round 1	W 73–58	23–9	St. Pete Times Forum; Tampa, FL
March 13, 2009; 9:45 pm, Raycom		vs. Auburn; SEC Championship round 2	L 58–61	23–10	St. Pete Times Forum; Tampa, FL
National Invitation Tournament
March 18, 2009; 8:00 pm	No. 1	No. 8 Jacksonville; National Invitational Tournament round #1	W 84–62	24–10	O'Connell Center; Gainesville, FL
March 20, 2009; 7:00 pm, ESPNU	No. 1	No. 4 Miami; National Invitational Tournament round #2	W 74–60	25–10	O'Connell Center; Gainesville, FL
March 24, 2009; 9:00 pm, ESPN	No. 1	No. 2 Penn State; National Invitational Tournament Quarterfinal	L 62–71	25–11	O'Connell Center; Gainesville, FL
*Non-conference game. ^{#}Rankings from AP poll. (#) Tournament seedings in parentheses.

== Rankings ==
Ranking movement Legend: ██ Increase in ranking. ██ Decrease in ranking. ██ Not ranked the previous week.
Poll	Pre	Wk 1	Wk 2	Wk 3	Wk 4	Wk 5	Wk 6	Wk 7	Wk 8	Wk 9	Wk 10	Wk 11	Wk 12	Wk 13	Wk 14	Wk 15	Wk 16	Wk 17	Wk 18	Wk 19	Final
AP	19	19	18	17	23	NR	NR	NR	NR	NR	NR	NR	23	NR	NR	NR	NR	NR	NR	NR	NR
Coaches	21	21	19	19	NR	NR	NR	NR	NR	NR	NR	NR	NR	NR	NR	NR	NR	NR	NR	NR	NR
