= Philip Pearson =

American basketball assistant coach (born 1971)

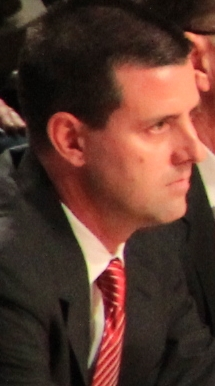
- Pearson in 2012

Current position
- Title: Assistant coach
- Team: Kennesaw State
- Conference: C-USA

Biographical details
- Born: February 16, 1971 (age 55); Montgomery, Alabama, U.S.

Playing career
- 1989–1994: Alabama

Coaching career (HC unless noted)
- 1994–1995: Arkansas–Little Rock (asst.)
- 1995–1998: Murray State (Asst.)
- 1998–2009: Alabama (asst.)
- 2009: Alabama (interim HC)
- 2009–2018: Georgia (asst.)
- 2020–2024: UAB (asst.)
- 2024–present: Kennesaw State (asst.)

Administrative career (AD unless noted)
- 2019–2020: Clemson (Director of Recruiting)

Head coaching record
- Overall: 6–7

Philip James Pearson (born February 16, 1971) is an American basketball assistant coach for Kennesaw State. During part of the 2008–09 college basketball season, he was the interim head coach for the University of Alabama Crimson Tide men's basketball team.

== Early life ==
Pearson was born in Montgomery, Alabama and attended high school at Jeff Davis High School, where he lettered in basketball and baseball and was also named an all-city basketball player.

He attended the University of Alabama between 1989 and 1994 where he played varsity basketball for five seasons, before graduating in December 1993 with a Bachelor of Science degree. While playing basketball, he was named as the Paul Bryant Student-Athlete of the Year and President's list academic honor roll.

== Coaching career ==
=== Assistant coach ===
During the 1994–95 men's college basketball season, Pearson worked an assistant under Wimp Sanderson for the Arkansas–Little Rock Trojans men's basketball team, in which time the Trojans went 17–12. In the next season, he moved to Murray State University under head coach Mark Gottfried where he worked as an administrative assistant, before being promoted to director of basketball operations in the following season. In 1997, while working for the athletics department, he graduated from Murray State with a Master of Arts in Health, Physical Education & Recreation. The next season, he was promoted to assistant coach. During his three seasons with the Racers, the basketball team won three OVC championships and advanced to two NCAA tournament appearances.

=== Alabama ===
On January 27, 2009, Pearson earned his first head coaching position when he was named interim head coach for the University of Alabama men's basketball program, following the resignation of Mark Gottfried.

Pearson lost his first game in charge of the Tide, an 89–80 decision in favor of Arkansas on January 29, before earning his first victory in a 75–70 win over Georgia two days later. Alabama's NCAA tournament hopes fell short when the team was eliminated by Tennessee 70–67 in the second round of the SEC tournament.

Alabama finished the season with an 18–14 record, with a 6–7 record under Pearson. He continued to lead Alabama as acting interim head coach until March 27, when it was announced that the school had hired Anthony Grant.

=== Georgia ===
On April 8, 2009, Pearson was named as an assistant coach at the University of Georgia, under new Bulldogs coach Mark Fox.

== Head coaching record ==
Record table
Season	Team	Overall	Conference	Standing	Postseason
Alabama Crimson Tide (Southeastern Conference) (2009)
2008–09	Alabama	6–7	5–6	4th (West)	
Alabama:		6–7 (.462)	5–6 (.455)		
Total:		6–7 (.462)			
National champion Postseason invitational champion Conference regular season champion Conference regular season and conference tournament champion Division regular season champion Division regular season and conference tournament champion Conference tournament champion

== Personal life ==
Pearson has two daughters and one son.
