= Cameron Tatum =

American basketball player (born 19988)

No. 2 – Rio Claro/Renata Basketball
- Position: Small forward
- League: NBB

Personal information
- Born: July 20, 1988 (age 38) Miami, Florida
- Listed height: 2.00 m (6 ft 7 in)

Career information
- High school: Tucker (Tucker, Georgia); The Patterson School (Lenoir, North Carolina)
- College: Tennessee (2007–2012)
- NBA draft: 2012: undrafted
- Playing career: 2012–present

Career history
- 2012–2013: Bakersfield Jam
- 2013–2014: AEK Larnaca
- 2014–2015: Guaiqueries de Margarita
- 2015–2016: Turów Zgorzelec
- 2016–2017: Mornar Bar
- 2017: Titanes del Distrito Nacional
- 2017–2018: Botafogo de Futebol e Regatas
- 2018: Leones de Santo Domingo
- 2019–present: Renata Basquete/Rio Claro

Career highlights
- Cypriot Basketball Cup winner (2013)

Cameron Tatum (born July 20, 1988) is an American professional basketball player for Renata Basquete/Rio Claro Basquete of the Novo Basquete Brasil (NBB). He played college basketball at the University of Tennessee.
