= Eniel Polynice =

Haitian-American basketball player

No. 14 – Saint-Quentin
- Position: Point guard / shooting guard
- League: LNB Pro B

Personal information
- Born: May 18, 1988 (age 38) Sarasota, Florida
- Listed height: 6 ft 5 in (1.96 m)
- Listed weight: 220 lb (100 kg)

Career information
- High school: Booker (Sarasota, Florida)
- College: Ole Miss (2006–2010); Seton Hall (2010–2011)
- NBA draft: 2011: undrafted
- Playing career: 2011–present

Career history
- 2011–2012: Los Angeles D-Fenders
- 2012–2013: Metros de Santiago
- 2013–2014: Bohemios Montevideo
- 2013–2014: Juventud Sionista
- 2014–2015: Bohemios Montevideo
- 2015: Atleticos de San German
- 2015–2016: Jefes de Fuerza Lagunera
- 2016: Cangrejeros de Santurce
- 2016–present: Saint-Quentin

Eniel Polynice (born May 18, 1988) is an American basketball player for Saint-Quentin of the LNB Pro B.

== Biography ==
Polynice was born in Sarasota, Florida. He graduated from Ole Miss with a B.A. in Broadcast Journalism and an M.A. in Strategic Communications from Seton Hall. In addition to English, he is fluent in French, and Haitian Creole. He is the nephew of retired NBA veteran and former first round, eighth overall selection of the Chicago Bulls, Olden Polynice.

== Professional ==
Polynice was a third round selection of the Los Angeles D-fenders in 2011 of the NBA Development League and became the team's only true rookie that year. As a guard he has a long wingspan, measured at 7 ft 2 in, which allows him to play the small forward position. Since his time in the D-League, he has played in multiple international leagues.
