= 2009–10 Southeastern Conference men's basketball season =

2009–10 SEC Men's Basketball Season
- League: NCAA Division I
- Sport: Basketball
- Teams: 12
- TV partner(s): CBS, ESPN, FSN

Regular Season
- 2010 SEC Champions: Kentucky
- Division Champions: Kentucky (East); Mississippi State (West)
- Season MVP: John Wall, Kentucky

Tournament
- Venue: Bridgestone Arena, Nashville, Tennessee
- Champions: Kentucky
- Runners-up: Mississippi State
- Finals MVP: John Wall, Kentucky

Basketball seasons
- 08–09 10–11

2009–10 Southeastern Conference men's basketball standings
	Conf.				Overall
Team	W		L	PCT	W		L	PCT
East
No. 2 Kentucky†	14	–	2	.875	35	–	3	.921
No. 21 Vanderbilt	12	–	4	.750	24	–	9	.727
No. 15 Tennessee	11	–	5	.688	28	–	9	.757
Florida	9	–	7	.563	21	–	13	.618
South Carolina	6	–	10	.375	15	–	16	.484
Georgia	5	–	11	.313	14	–	17	.452
West
Mississippi State	9	–	7	.563	24	–	12	.667
Mississippi	9	–	7	.563	24	–	11	.686
Arkansas	7	–	9	.438	14	–	18	.438
Alabama	6	–	10	.375	17	–	15	.531
Auburn	6	–	10	.375	15	–	17	.469
LSU	2	–	14	.125	11	–	20	.355
† 2010 SEC tournament winner As of March 30, 2010; Rankings from AP Poll

The 2009–10 Southeastern Conference men's basketball season began with practices on October 17, 2009, and ended with the Southeastern Conference (SEC) Tournament on March 11–14, 2010 at the Bridgestone Arena in Nashville.

== Pre-season polls and teams ==
2009–10 SEC Men's Basketball Pre-Season Poll:

	SEC Media
	**SEC East**
1.	Kentucky
2.	Tennessee
3.	Vanderbilt
4.	South Carolina
5.	Florida
6.	Georgia
	**SEC West**
1.	Mississippi State
2.	Ole Miss
3.	Alabama
4.	LSU
5.	Arkansas
6.	Auburn

Pre-Season All-SEC Teams

SEC Media	SEC Coaches
Devan Downey South Carolina; **Patrick Patterson Kentucky**; Tyler Smith Tennessee; Jarvis Varnado Mississippi State; Terrico White Ole Miss	Devan Downey South Carolina; Tasmin Mitchell LSU; AJ Ogilvy Vanderbilt; **Patrick Patterson Kentucky**; Tyler Smith Tennessee; Jarvis Varnado Mississippi State; Michael Washington Arkansas; Terrico White Ole Miss

- SEC Coaches select 8 players
- Players in bold are choices for SEC Player of the Year

== Rankings ==
Legend
Increase in ranking
Decrease in ranking
Not ranked previous week

		Pre	Wk 1	Wk 2	Wk 3	Wk 4	Wk 5	Wk 6	Wk 7	Wk 8	Wk 9	Wk 10	Wk 11	Wk 12	Wk 13	Wk 14	Wk 15	Wk 16	Wk 17	Wk 18	Final
Alabama	AP																				
Alabama	C																				
Arkansas	AP																				
Arkansas	C																				
Auburn	AP																				
Auburn	C																				
Florida	AP	RV	RV	RV	13	10	13	18	RV	RV	RV										
Florida	C	RV	RV	RV	17	10	13	18	RV	RV											
Georgia	AP																				
Georgia	C																				
Kentucky	AP	4	4	5	5	4	3	3	3	3	2	2	1	4	3	2	2	3	2		
Kentucky	C	5	5	5	4	4	3	3	3	3	2	2	1	3	2	2	2	3	2		
LSU	AP			RV																	
LSU	C																				
Mississippi State	AP	18	RV	RV		RV	RV	RV	RV	RV	RV	23	RV			RV	RV	RV			
Mississippi State	C	19	RV			RV	RV	RV	RV	RV	RV	RV	RV								
Ole Miss	AP		RV	RV	RV	25	20	15	16	14	21	22	18	25	RV						
Ole Miss	C	RV	RV	RV	RV	RV	25	21	21	16	23	24	20	RV	RV						
South Carolina	AP	RV	RV																		
South Carolina	C	RV																			
Tennessee	AP	10	10	9	11	9	9	16	14	16	9	8	14	14	12	20	19	16	15		
Tennessee	C	11	11	11	12	9	9	14	14	15	10	8	14	14	12	18	17	13	13		
Vanderbilt	AP	RV	RV	24	RV	RV				RV	RV	RV	21	18	22	17	16	13	20		
Vanderbilt	C	RV	RV	24	RV	24					RV	RV	23	20	24	19	20	19	23		

== Head coaches ==
School	Name	Age	Seasons	Record	Alma Mata	Hometown	Previous Positions
Alabama	Anthony Grant	43	1	0–0	Dayton	Miami, FL, U.S.	VCU
Arkansas	John Pelphrey	41	3	37–28	Kentucky	Paintsville, KY, U.S.	South Alabama
Auburn	Jeff Lebo	43	6	81–76	North Carolina	Carlisle, PA, U.S.	Tennessee Tech; Chattanooga
Florida	Billy Donovan	44	14	310–126	Providence	Rockville Centre, NY, U.S.	Marshall
Georgia	Mark Fox	40	1	0–0	Eastern New Mexico	Garden City, KS, U.S.	Nevada
Kentucky	John Calipari	50	1	0–0	Clarion	Moon Township, PA, U.S.	UMass; New Jersey Nets; Memphis
LSU	Trent Johnson	53	2	27–8	Boise State	Berkeley, CA, U.S.	Nevada; Stanford
Mississippi State	Rick Stansbury	49	12	231–128	Campbellsville	Brandenburg, KY, U.S.	
Ole Miss	Andy Kennedy	41	4	82–52	UAB	Louisville, MS, U.S.	Cincinnati
South Carolina	Darrin Horn	36	2	21–10	Western Kentucky	Glasgow, KY, U.S.	Western Kentucky
Tennessee	Bruce Pearl	49	5	98–37	Boston College	Boston, MA, U.S.	Southern Indiana; UW-Milwaukee
Vanderbilt	Kevin Stallings	49	11	189–128	Purdue	Collinsville, IL, U.S.	Illinois State

== Postseason ==
=== NCAA tournament ===
# of Bids	Record	Win %	R32	S16	E8	F4	CG
4	6–4	.600	2	2	2	0	0

Team	Bid Type	Seed	Results
Kentucky	Automatic	1	**W 100–71** vs 16 East Tennessee State; **W 90–60** vs 9 Wake Forest; **W 62–45** vs 12 Cornell; **L 66–73** vs 2 West Virginia
Vanderbilt	At-large	4	**L 65–66** vs 13 Murray State
Tennessee	At-large	6	**W 62–59** vs 11 San Diego State; **W 83–68** vs 14 Ohio; **W 76–73** vs 2 Ohio State; **L 69–70** vs 5 Michigan State
Florida	At-large	10	**L 92–99 (2OT)** vs 7 BYU

=== National Invitation Tournament ===
# of Bids	Record	Win %	R2	R3	SF	CG
2	4–2	.667	2	1	1	0

Team	Bid Type	Seed	Results
Mississippi State	At-large	1	**W 81–67** vs. 8 Jackson State; **L 74–76** vs. 4 North Carolina
Ole Miss	At-large	2	**W 84–65** vs. 7 Troy; **W 90–81** vs. 3 Memphis; **W 90–87 (2OT)** vs. 5 Texas Tech; **L 63–68** vs 3 Dayton

== Highlights and notes ==
2010 Big East/SEC Invitational

Date	SEC Team	Big East Team	Location	Outcome
12/9	Georgia	St. John's	Madison Square Garden, New York	**St. John's 66–56** Big East 1–0
12/9	Kentucky	UConn	Madison Square Garden, New York	**Kentucky 64–61** Tied 1–1
12/10	Mississippi State	DePaul	St. Pete Times Forum, Tampa	**Mississippi State 76–45** SEC 2–1
12/10	Florida	Syracuse	St. Pete Times Forum, Tampa	**Syracuse 85–73** Tied 2–2

Players of the week

Throughout the conference regular season, the SEC offices named a player of the week each Monday.

Week	Player of the week	Freshman of the week
11/16	Rotnei Clarke, ARK	Eric Bledsoe, UK
11/23	Patrick Patterson, UK	John Wall, UK
11/30	Erving Walker, FLA	John Wall, UK (2)
12/7	A.J. Ogilvy, VANDY	John Wall, UK (3)
12/14	Ravern Johnson, MISS STATE	John Wall, UK (4)
12/21	Trey Thompkins, UGA	Reginald Buckner, MISS
12/28	JaMychal Green, BAMA	DeMarcus Cousins, UK
1/4	DeMarcus Cousins, UK	John Jenkins, VANDY
1/11	Bobby Maze, TENN	John Jenkins, VANDY (2)
1/18	Jarvis Varnado, MISS STATE	Eric Bledsoe, UK (2)
1/25	Travis Leslie, UGA	DeMarcus Cousins, UK (2)
2/1	Devan Downey, USC	Marshawn Powell, ARK
2/8	Courtney Fortson, ARK	DeMarcus Cousins, UK (3)
2/15	Jeffery Taylor, VANDY	John Wall, UK (5)
2/22	Wayne Chism, TENN	DeMarcus Cousins, UK (4)
3/1	Jarvis Varnado, MISS STATE (2)	John Jenkins, VANDY (3)
3/8	Chris Warren, MISS	Tony Mitchell, BAMA

Award Finalists Notes

- Bob Cousy Award: The Naismith Memorial Basketball Hall of Fame in Springfield, Massachusetts, on Feb. 4, 2010 announced the final 11 candidates in consideration for the 2010 Bob Cousy Award presented by The Hartford Financial Services Group, Inc. This annual award is given to college basketball's top point guard and is named after Hall of Famer and former Boston Celtics guard Bob Cousy. An original list of 73 candidates made up of players from Division I, II and III schools was trimmed by a Hall of Fame appointed, nationally based committee to 20 and has now narrowed that list to a final 11. Devan Downey (South Carolina) and John Wall (Kentucky) were among the 11 finalists.
- Oscar Robertson Trophy: Three SEC players were among the 16 announced finalists for the 2010 Oscar Robertson Trophy, to be presented to the U.S. Basketball Writers Association's national player of the year. Included among the SEC's candidates are: Kentucky's DeMarcus Cousins, South Carolina's Devan Downey and Kentucky's John Wall.

== NBA draft ==
PG	Point guard	SG	Shooting guard	SF	Small forward	PF	Power forward	C	Center

Player	Team	Round	Pick #	Position	School	Nationality
John Wall	Washington Wizards	1	1	PG	Kentucky	United States
DeMarcus Cousins	Sacramento Kings	1	5	C	Kentucky	United States
Patrick Patterson	Houston Rockets	1	14	PF	Kentucky	United States
Eric Bledsoe	Oklahoma City Thunder	1	18	PG	Kentucky	United States
Daniel Orton	Orlando Magic	1	29	C	Kentucky	United States
Terrico White	Detroit Pistons	2	36	SG	Ole Miss	United States
Jarvis Varnado	Miami Heat	2	41	PF	Mississippi State	United States

== Awards and honors ==
=== All SEC teams and awards ===
The following individuals received postseason honors after having been chosen by the SEC coaches:

**2010 SEC Men's Basketball Individual Awards**
Award	Recipient(s)
Player of the Year	John Wall, KENTUCKY
Coach of the Year	Kevin Stallings, VANDERBILT
Defensive Player of the Year	Jarvis Varnado†, F., MISS STATE
Rookie of the Year	DeMarcus Cousins, C., KENTUCKY
Scholar-Athlete of the Year	Ray Shipman, G., FLORIDA
Sixth Man Award	John Jenkins, G., VANDERBILT

**2010 All-SEC Men's Basketball Teams**
First Team	Second Team	All-Defensive Team	All-Rookie Team
Trey Thompkins†, F., GEORGIA; DeMarcus Cousins†, C., KENTUCKY; Patrick Patterson, F., KENTUCKY; John Wall†, G., KENTUCKY; Jarvis Varnado, F., MISS STATE; Devan Downey†, G., SOUTH CAROLINA; Wayne Chism, F., TENNESSEE; Jermaine Beal†, G., VANDERBILT	Mikhail Torrance, G., ALABAMA; Courtney Fortson, G., ARKANSAS; Erving Walker, G., FLORIDA; Tasmin Mitchell, F., LSU; Chris Warren, G., OLE MISS; Dee Bost, G., MISS STATE; AJ Ogilvy, C., VANDERBILT; Jeff Taylor, F., VANDERBILT	Patrick Patterson, F., KENTUCKY; Jarvis Varnado†, F., MISS STATE; Devan Downey, G., SOUTH CAROLINA; Sam Muldrow, F., SOUTH CAROLINA; Jeff Taylor, F., VANDERBILT	Tony Mitchell, G., ALABAMA; Marshawn Powell†, F., ARKANSAS; Kenny Boynton, G., FLORIDA; Eric Bledsoe†, G., KENTUCKY; DeMarcus Cousins†, C., KENTUCKY; John Wall†, G., KENTUCKY; Reginald Buckner, F., OLE MISS; John Jenkins†, G.,VANDERBILT
† - denotes unanimous selection
