= 2008–09 Southeastern Conference men's basketball season =

2008–09 SEC Men's Basketball Season
- League: NCAA Division I
- Sport: Basketball
- Teams: 12
- TV partner(s): CBS, ESPN, FSN, Raycom

Regular Season
- Champion: LSU
- Season MVP: Marcus Thornton, LSU

Tournament
- Venue: St. Pete Times Forum, Tampa, Florida
- Champions: Mississippi State
- Runners-up: Tennessee
- Finals MVP: Jarvis Varnado, Mississippi State

Basketball seasons
- ← 2007–08 2009–10 →

2008–09 Southeastern Conference men's basketball standings
	Conf.				Overall
Team	W		L	PCT	W		L	PCT
East
South Carolina	10	–	6	.625	21	–	10	.677
Tennessee	10	–	6	.625	21	–	13	.618
Florida	9	–	7	.563	25	–	11	.694
Vanderbilt	8	–	8	.500	19	–	12	.613
Kentucky	8	–	8	.500	22	–	14	.611
Georgia	3	–	13	.188	12	–	20	.375
West
No. 21 LSU	13	–	3	.813	27	–	8	.771
Auburn	10	–	6	.625	24	–	12	.667
Mississippi State†	9	–	7	.563	23	–	13	.639
Alabama	7	–	9	.438	18	–	14	.563
Ole Miss	7	–	9	.438	16	–	15	.516
Arkansas	2	–	14	.125	14	–	16	.467
† SEC Tournament winner Rankings from AP Poll

== Rankings ==
AP Poll	Pre	Wk 1	Wk 2	Wk 3	Wk 4	Wk 5	Wk 6	Wk 7	Wk 8	Wk 9	Wk 10	Wk 11	Wk 12	Wk 13	Wk 14	Wk 15	Wk 16	Wk 17	Wk 18	Final^
Alabama	RV	RV																		
Arkansas									RV	RV	RV									
Auburn																		RV	RV	
Florida	19	18	17	23	RV	RV	RV	RV	RV	RV	24	RV	RV	RV		RV				
Georgia																				
Kentucky	RV										RV	24	RV		RV	RV				
LSU	RV	RV	RV	RV	RV	RV					RV		RV	RV	23	18	12	20	21	17
Mississippi State																		RV	RV	
Ole Miss																				
South Carolina													RV	RV	RV	RV	RV			
Tennessee	14	14	12	10	8	16	16	14	15	24	RV									RV
Vanderbilt	RV	RV																		

^Final Poll = ESPN/USA Today Coaches Poll

== Awards ==
Award	Recipient	Class	Team
SEC Player of the Year (Media)	Marcus Thornton	Sr.	LSU
SEC Player of the Year (Coaches)	Marcus Thornton	Sr.	LSU
SEC Coach of the Year (Media)	Trent Johnson	1st year	LSU
SEC Coach of the Year (Coaches)	Trent Johnson	1st year	LSU
SEC Freshman of the Year (Media)
SEC Freshman of the Year (Coaches)	Terrico White	Fr.	Ole Miss
SEC Defensive Player of the Year (Media)	Jarvis Varnado	Jr.	Mississippi State
SEC Defensive Player of the Year (Coaches)	Jarvis Varnado	Jr.	Mississippi State
SEC Sixth Man (Coaches)	Brandis Raley-Ross	Sr.	South Carolina
SEC Awards

=== All-Conference Teams ===
All-SEC First Team

Position	Player	Class	Team
G	Nick Calathes	So.	Florida
G	Jodie Meeks	Jr.	Kentucky
G	Devan Downey	Jr.	South Carolina
G	Marcus Thornton	Sr.	LSU
F	Tyler Smith	Jr.	Tennessee
F	Tasmin Mitchell	Jr.	LSU
F	Patrick Patterson	So.	Kentucky
F	Jarvis Varnado	Jr.	Mississippi State
SEC First Team
