= 2009–10 South Carolina Gamecocks men's basketball team =

American college basketball season

2009–10 South Carolina Gamecocks men's basketball
- Conference: Southeastern Conference
- East
- Record: 15–16 (6–10 SEC)
- Head coach: Darrin Horn (2nd season)
- Assistant coaches: Neill Berry; Michael Boynton; Cypheus Bunton
- Home arena: Colonial Life Arena

2009–10 Southeastern Conference men's basketball standings
	Conf.				Overall
Team	W		L	PCT	W		L	PCT
East
No. 2 Kentucky†	14	–	2	.875	35	–	3	.921
No. 21 Vanderbilt	12	–	4	.750	24	–	9	.727
No. 15 Tennessee	11	–	5	.688	28	–	9	.757
Florida	9	–	7	.563	21	–	13	.618
South Carolina	6	–	10	.375	15	–	16	.484
Georgia	5	–	11	.313	14	–	17	.452
West
Mississippi State	9	–	7	.563	24	–	12	.667
Mississippi	9	–	7	.563	24	–	11	.686
Arkansas	7	–	9	.438	14	–	18	.438
Alabama	6	–	10	.375	17	–	15	.531
Auburn	6	–	10	.375	15	–	17	.469
LSU	2	–	14	.125	11	–	20	.355
† 2010 SEC tournament winner As of March 30, 2010; Rankings from AP Poll

The 2009–10 South Carolina men's basketball team represented University of South Carolina during the 2009–10 college basketball season. The head coach was Darrin Horn who was in his second season with the Gamecocks. The team played its home games at the 18,000-seat Colonial Life Arena in Columbia, South Carolina. All games were produced and broadcast locally by the Gamecock Sports Radio Network. They finished the season 15–16, 6–10 in Southeastern Conference play and lost in the first round of the 2010 SEC men's basketball tournament to Alabama. The Gamecocks were not invited to a post season tournament. The highlight of the season was a home upset of #1 Kentucky on January 26.

== Regular season ==
On December 21, 2009, it was announced that senior starting forward Dominique Archie would miss the rest of the season due to knee surgery required to repair an injury he suffered early in the Miami game. The Gamecocks played all games in the month of December without Archie and junior starter Mike Holmes after he suffered facial injuries during Thanksgiving break. Holmes was subsequently dismissed from the basketball team on January 1, 2010, for a repeated violation of team rules.

On January 26, 2010, Carolina won their first game in school history over a #1 ranked team, beating the undefeated (19-0) Kentucky Wildcats, 68-62.

== Roster ==
No.	Name	Ht.	Wt.	Position	Year	Hometown
21	Dominique Archie	6'7"	216	F	SR	Augusta, Georgia
31	Evaldas Baniulis	6'7"	215	F	SR	Vilnius, Lithuania
15	Malik Cooke	6'6"	210	F	JR	Charlotte, North Carolina
2	Devan Downey	5'9"	170	G	SR	Chester, South Carolina
12	Ramon Galloway	6'1"	170	G	FR	Palm Beach Gardens, Florida
24	Mike Holmes	6'7"	230	F/C	JR	Bishopville, South Carolina
	Lakeem Jackson	6'5"	225	SF	FR	Charlotte, North Carolina
32	Johndre Jefferson	6'9"	210	F	JR	Santee, South Carolina
44	Sam Muldrow	6'9"	220	F	JR	Florence, South Carolina
5	Brandis Raley-Ross	6'2"	194	G	SR	Gastonia, North Carolina
1	Stephen Spinella	6'4"	190	G	FR	Colts Neck, New Jersey
25	Austin Steed	6'8"	235	F	JR	Hephzibah, Georgia
14	Robert Wilder	6'1"	188	G	SR	Chapin, South Carolina
	Tobias Watson	5'9	175	G	Jr	Richland Northeast

=== 2010 Commitments ===
College recruiting
Name	Hometown	School	Height	Weight	Commit date
Bruce Ellington; PG	Moncks Corner, SC	Berkeley HS	5 ft 10 in (1.78 m)	185 lb (84 kg)	Sep 11, 2009
Bruce Ellington; PG	Recruit ratings: Scout: Rivals: (91)				
Damontre Harris; PF	Fayetteville, NC	Trinity Christian School	6 ft 9 in (2.06 m)	225 lb (102 kg)	Sep 21, 2009
Damontre Harris; PF	Recruit ratings: Scout: Rivals: (94)				
Brian Richardson; SG	Wilson, NC	Greenfield School	6 ft 5 in (1.96 m)	180 lb (82 kg)	Sep 21, 2009
Brian Richardson; SG	Recruit ratings: Scout: Rivals: (88)				
R.J. Slawson; PF	North Charleston, SC	Fort Dorchester HS	6 ft 8 in (2.03 m)	190 lb (86 kg)	Jul 16, 2009
R.J. Slawson; PF	Recruit ratings: Scout: Rivals: (93)				
Eric Smith; PG	Arden, NC	Christ School	6 ft 0 in (1.83 m)	185 lb (84 kg)	Aug 28, 2009
Eric Smith; PG	Recruit ratings: Scout: Rivals: (89)				
Overall recruit ranking: Scout: 10 Rivals: 13
Note: In many cases, Scout, Rivals, 247Sports, On3, and ESPN may conflict in their listings of height and weight.; In these cases, the average was taken. ESPN grades are on a 100-point scale.; Sources: "South Carolina Basketball Commitments". Rivals.; "2010 South Carolina Basketball Commits". Scout.; "ESPN". ESPN.; "Scout.com Team Recruiting Rankings". Scout.; "2010 Team Ranking". Rivals.

== Schedule and results ==
Date time, TV	Rank^{#}	Opponent^{#}	Result	Record	Site (attendance) city, state
Exhibition
Thurs, Nov. 5*; 7:00pm		Kentucky Wesleyan; Exhibition	W 78–55		Colonial Life Arena (5,493); Columbia, SC
Non-conference regular season
Fri, Nov. 13*; 7:00pm, SportSouth		Alabama A&M	W 88–50	1–0	Colonial Life Arena (10,769); Columbia, SC
Mon, Nov. 16*; 7:00pm, SportSouth		Georgia Southern	W 90–66	2–0	Colonial Life Arena (10,212); Columbia, SC
Thu, Nov. 19*; 9:30pm, ESPNU		vs. La Salle; Charleston Classic	W 78–68	3–0	Carolina First Arena (2,115); Charleston, SC
Fri, Nov. 20*; 9:30pm, CSS		vs. South Florida; Charleston Classic	W 69–66	4–0	Carolina First Arena (2,391); Charleston, SC
Sun, Nov. 22*; 6:00pm, ESPN2		vs. Miami (FL); Charleston Classic	L 70–85	4–1	Carolina First Arena (2,531); Charleston, SC
Fri, Nov. 27*; 7:00pm, SportSouth		Jacksonville	W 97–93	5–1	Colonial Life Arena (10,318); Columbia, SC
Wed, Dec. 2*; 7:00pm, SportSouth		Western Kentucky	W 74–56	6–1	Colonial Life Arena (10,707); Columbia, SC
Sun, Dec. 6*; 1:00pm, FS Carolinas		at No. 18 Clemson; Carolina-Clemson Rivalry	L 61–72	6–2	Littlejohn Coliseum (10,000); Clemson, SC
Wed, Dec. 16*; 7:00pm, SportSouth		Richmond	W 76–58	7–2	Colonial Life Arena (9,640); Columbia, SC
Sat, Dec. 19*; 7:00pm, SportSouth		at Wofford	L 61–68	7–3	Benjamin Johnson Arena (3,500); Spartanburg, SC
Mon, Dec. 21*; 7:00pm, SportSouth		Furman	W 81–57	8–3	Colonial Life Arena (9,674); Columbia, SC
Wed, Dec. 30*; 9:00pm, ESPNU		at Boston College	L 76–85	8–4	Conte Forum (6,846); Boston, MA
Sat, Jan. 2*; 12:00pm, FS Carolinas		Baylor	L 74–85	8–5	Colonial Life Arena (11,312); Columbia, SC
Tue, Jan. 5*; 7:00pm, FS Carolinas		Longwood	W 88–58	9–5	Colonial Life Arena (8,652); Columbia, SC
SEC regular season
Sat, Jan. 9; 1:30pm, SEC Network		at Auburn	W 80–71	10–5 (1–0)	Beard-Eaves-Memorial Coliseum (5,638); Auburn, AL
Wed, Jan. 13; 8:00pm, SEC Network		LSU	W 67–58	11–5 (2–0)	Colonial Life Arena (12,103); Columbia, SC
Sat, Jan. 16; 6:00pm, CSS		Vanderbilt	L 79–89	11–6 (2–1)	Colonial Life Arena (13,166); Columbia, SC
Wed, Jan. 20; 9:00pm, CSS		at No. 24 Mississippi	L 57–66	11–7 (2–2)	Tad Smith Coliseum (6,824); Oxford, MS
Sat, Jan. 23; 6:00pm, ESPN		at Florida	L 56–58	11–8 (2–3)	O'Connell Center (12,094); Gainesville, FL
Tue, Jan. 26; 9:00pm, ESPN		No. 1 Kentucky	W 68–62	12–8 (3–3)	Colonial Life Arena (18,000); Columbia, SC
Sat, Jan. 30; 7:00pm, FSN		Georgia	W 78–77	13–8 (4–3)	Colonial Life Arena (14,013); Columbia, SC
Sat, Feb. 6; 6:00pm, ESPN		at No. 14 Tennessee	L 53–79	13–9 (4–4)	Thompson-Boling Arena (21,003); Knoxville, TN
Wed, Feb. 10; 8:00pm, SEC Network		Florida	W 77–71	14–9 (5–4)	Colonial Life Arena (12,774); Columbia, SC
Sat, Feb. 13; 4:00pm, SEC Network		at Georgia	L 61–66	14–10 (5–5)	Stegeman Coliseum (7,597); Athens, GA
Wed, Feb. 17; 9:00pm, CSS		at Arkansas	L 79–92	14–11 (5–6)	Bud Walton Arena (13,175); Fayetteville, AR
Sat, Feb. 20; 1:30pm, SEC Network		No. 18 Tennessee	L 55–63	14–12 (5–7)	Colonial Life Arena (15,622); Columbia, SC
Thu, Feb. 25; 9:00pm, ESPN		at No. 2 Kentucky	L 61–82	14–13 (5–8)	Rupp Arena (24,355); Lexington, KY
Sat, Feb. 27; 6:00pm, ESPN		Mississippi State	L 63–76	14–14 (5–9)	Colonial Life Arena (13,834); Columbia, SC
Wed, Mar. 3; 7:00pm, ESPNU		Alabama	L 70–79	14–15 (5–10)	Colonial Life Arena (11,109); Columbia, SC
Sat, Mar. 6; 2:00pm, ESPN2		at No. 19 Vanderbilt	W 77–73	15–15 (6–10)	Memorial Gymnasium (14,316); Nashville, TN
SEC tournament
Thu, Mar. 11; 1:00pm, SEC Network	(E5)	vs. (W4) Alabama; First Round	L 63–68	15–16	Bridgestone Arena (15,152); Nashville, TN
*Non-conference game. ^{#}Rankings from Coaches Poll. (#) Tournament seedings in parentheses. All times are in Eastern Time.

== Awards ==
Devan Downey

- First Team All-SEC (AP and Coaches)
- Honorable Mention AP All-American
- Oscar Robertson National Player Of The Week, 1/31/10
- SEC Player of the Week, 2/1/10
- Bob Cousy Award Finalist
- Oscar Robertson Trophy Finalist
- Preseason First Team All-SEC
- Naismith Trophy Preseason Watchlist
- John R. Wooden Award Preseason Candidate

Dominique Archie

- Preseason Second Team All-SEC

== See also ==
- 2009–10 South Carolina Gamecocks women's basketball team
