= 2009–10 Auburn Tigers men's basketball team =

American college basketball season

2009–10 Auburn Tigers men's basketball
- Conference: Southeastern Conference
- West
- Record: 15–17 (6–10 SEC)
- Head coach: Jeff Lebo (6th season)
- Home arena: Beard–Eaves–Memorial Coliseum

2009–10 Southeastern Conference men's basketball standings
	Conf.				Overall
Team	W		L	PCT	W		L	PCT
East
No. 2 Kentucky†	14	–	2	.875	35	–	3	.921
No. 21 Vanderbilt	12	–	4	.750	24	–	9	.727
No. 15 Tennessee	11	–	5	.688	28	–	9	.757
Florida	9	–	7	.563	21	–	13	.618
South Carolina	6	–	10	.375	15	–	16	.484
Georgia	5	–	11	.313	14	–	17	.452
West
Mississippi State	9	–	7	.563	24	–	12	.667
Mississippi	9	–	7	.563	24	–	11	.686
Arkansas	7	–	9	.438	14	–	18	.438
Alabama	6	–	10	.375	17	–	15	.531
Auburn	6	–	10	.375	15	–	17	.469
LSU	2	–	14	.125	11	–	20	.355
† 2010 SEC tournament winner As of March 30, 2010; Rankings from AP Poll

The 2009–10 Auburn Tigers basketball team represented Auburn during the 2009–10 NCAA Division I men's basketball season. The Tigers, led by 6th-year head coach Jeff Lebo, played their home games at the Beard–Eaves–Memorial Coliseum and were members of the Southeastern Conference. They finished the season 15–17 and 6–10 in SEC play to finish fifth in the West division. They lost to Florida in the first round of the SEC Basketball tournament.

== Previous season ==
The Tigers finished the 2008–09 season 24–12 overall and 10–6 in SEC play. After losing to Tennessee in the semifinals of the SEC Tournament, the Tigers were invited to the 2009 NIT. At the NIT, Auburn defeated UT Martin and Tulsa before losing to Baylor in the quarterfinals of the tournament.

== Roster ==
2009–10 Auburn Tigers men's basketball team
Players
Coaches

Pos.	#	Name	Height	Weight	Year	Hometown
G	1	Andre Malone	6 ft 5 in (1.96 m)	202 lb (92 kg)	Fr	Atlanta, GA
F	4	Lucas Hargrove	6 ft 6 in (1.98 m)	205 lb (93 kg)	Sr	Pontiac, SC
F	5	Ty Armstrong	6 ft 9 in (2.06 m)	225 lb (102 kg)	Fr	Melbourne, FL
G	10	Larry Williams	6 ft 2 in (1.88 m)	160 lb (73 kg)	So	Birmingham, AL
G	11	Josh Wallace	5 ft 10 in (1.78 m)	160 lb (73 kg)	Fr	Pensacola, FL
G	12	DeWayne Reed	6 ft 1 in (1.85 m)	175 lb (79 kg)	Sr	Houston, TX
G	15	Tony Neysmith	6 ft 5 in (1.96 m)	205 lb (93 kg)	So	Norcross, GA
G	20	Frankie Sullivan	6 ft 1 in (1.85 m)	185 lb (84 kg)	So	Uniontown, AL
F	22	Kenny Gabriel	6 ft 8 in (2.03 m)	200 lb (91 kg)	So	Charlotte, NC
G	24	Tay Waller	6 ft 2 in (1.88 m)	180 lb (82 kg)	Sr	Manchester, GA
F	25	Jake Drum	6 ft 5 in (1.96 m)	215 lb (98 kg)	So	Hoover, AL
C	30	Brendon Knox	6 ft 10 in (2.08 m)	220 lb (100 kg)	Sr	Georgetown, SC
G	33	Earnest Ross	6 ft 5 in (1.96 m)	215 lb (98 kg)	Fr	Cary, NC
C	34	Johnnie Lett	6 ft 8 in (2.03 m)	210 lb (95 kg)	Sr	Mobile, AL
C	41	Rob Chubb	6 ft 10 in (2.08 m)	220 lb (100 kg)	Fr	Peachtree City, GA
G	44	Dylan Spencer	6 ft 4 in (1.93 m)	190 lb (86 kg)	Fr	Birmingham, AL

Head coach

- Jeff Lebo (North Carolina)

Assistant coach(es)

Legend

- (C) Team captain
- (S) Suspended
- (I) Ineligible
- (W) Walk-on
- Injured
- Current redshirt

== Schedule and results ==
Date time, TV	Rank^{#}	Opponent^{#}	Result	Record	High points	High rebounds	High assists	Site (attendance) city, state
Non-conference regular season
November 13, 2009*; 9:30 p.m.		Niagara	W 69–65	1–0	24 – Reed	7 – Sullivan	3 – Reed	Beard–Eaves–Memorial Coliseum; Auburn, AL
November 16, 2009*; 8:05 p.m.		at Missouri State	L 62–73	1–1	24 – Hargrove	6 – Tied	4 – Hargrove	Great Southern Bank Arena (7,213); Springfield, MO
November 20, 2009*; 6:00 p.m.		vs. UCF; Glenn Wilkes Classic	L 74–84	1–2	22 – Sullivan	6 – Tied	5 – Reed	Ocean Center; Daytona Beach, FL
November 21, 2009*; 6:00 p.m.		vs. IUPUI; Glenn Wilkes Classic	W 80–65	2–2	24 – Reed	8 – Hargrove	6 – Hargrove	Ocean Center (360); Daytona Beach, FL
November 22, 2009*; 8:15 p.m.		vs. NC State; Glenn Wilkes Classic	L 58–60	2–3	21 – Sullivan	8 – Reed	4 – Tied	Ocean Center (616); Daytona Beach, FL
November 25, 2009*; 7:00 p.m.		High Point	W 75–54	3–3	17 – Hargrove	12 – Hargrove	4 – Reed	Beard–Eaves–Memorial Coliseum; Auburn, AL
December 1, 2009*; 8:30 p.m.		at Alabama A&M	W 87–52	4–3	22 – Hargrove	13 – Hargrove	4 – Wallace	Elmore Gymnasium; Huntsville, AL
December 4, 2009*; 8:00 p.m.		Troy	L 77–81	4–4	18 – Reed	9 – Hargrove	7 – Reed	Beard–Eaves–Memorial Coliseum; Auburn, AL
December 7, 2009*; 8:00 p.m.		Virginia	W 68–67	5–4	18 – Reed	9 – Hargrove	7 – Reed	Beard–Eaves–Memorial Coliseum (5,493); Auburn, AL
December 17, 2009*; 7:00 p.m.		at Florida State	L 72–76	5–5	17 – Tied	9 – Sullivan	5 – Reed	Donald L. Tucker Center (6,063); Tallahassee, FL
December 20, 2009*; 2:00 p.m.		Sam Houston	L 89–107	5–6	19 – Reed	5 – Lett	5 – Reed	Beard–Eaves–Memorial Coliseum (4,221); Auburn, AL
December 22, 2009*; 8:00 p.m.		Alabama State	W 94–78	6–6	18 – Knox	6 – Tied	4 – Sullivan	Beard–Eaves–Memorial Coliseum; Auburn, AL
December 29, 2009*; 8:00 p.m.		Charleston Southern	W 77–62	7–6	20 – Hargrove	13 – Hargrove	4 – Hargrove	Beard–Eaves–Memorial Coliseum; Auburn, AL
January 2, 2010*; 2:00 p.m.		Georgia Southern	W 95–75	8–6	18 – Knox	11 – Knox	6 – Reed	Beard–Eaves–Memorial Coliseum; Auburn, AL
January 5, 2010*; 8:00 p.m.		West Georgia	W 96–72	9–6	20 – Reed	6 – Tied	6 – Tied	Beard–Eaves–Memorial Coliseum; Auburn, AL
SEC regular season
January 9, 2010; 1:30 p.m.		South Carolina	L 71–80	9–7 (0–1)	22 – Knox	12 – Hargrove	8 – Reed	Beard–Eaves–Memorial Coliseum (5,638); Auburn, AL
January 12, 2010; 8:00 p.m.		at No. 9 Tennessee	L 55–81	9–8 (0–2)	19 – Reed	7 – Waller	5 – Hargrove	Thompson–Boling Arena (20,368); Knoxville, TN
January 16, 2010; 4:00 p.m.		No. 13 Kentucky	L 67–72	9–9 (0–3)	19 – Reed	9 – Malone	6 – Reed	Beard–Eaves–Memorial Coliseum (11,669); Auburn, AL
January 20, 2010; 8:00 p.m.		at LSU	W 84–80	10–9 (1–3)	21 – Reed	6 – Tied	3 – Tied	Pete Maravich Assembly Center (9,445); Baton Rouge, LA
January 23, 2010; 1:30 p.m.		at Vanderbilt	L 74–82	10–10 (1–4)	19 – Hargrove	10 – Hargrove	4 – Reed	Memorial Gymnasium (14,316); Nashville, TN
January 28, 2010; 9:00 p.m.		No. 18 Ole Miss	L 74–84	10–11 (1–5)	21 – Waller	8 – Hargrove	7 – Reed	Beard–Eaves–Memorial Coliseum (6,984); Auburn, AL
January 30, 2010; 4:00 p.m.		Alabama	W 58–57	11–11 (2–5)	20 – Waller	5 – Tied	2 – Sullivan	Beard–Eaves–Memorial Coliseum (10,775); Auburn, AL
February 6, 2010; 1:45 p.m.		at Arkansas	L 79–82 ^{OT}	11–12 (2–6)	18 – Tied	10 – Lett	4 – Reed	Bud Walton Arena (13,811); Fayetteville, AR
February 13, 2010; 9:00 p.m.		Georgia	W 82–63	12–12 (3–6)	24 – Hargrove	11 – Hargrove	3 – Tied	Beard–Eaves–Memorial Coliseum; Auburn, AL
February 13, 2010; 7:00 p.m.		at Mississippi State	L 75–85 ^{OT}	12–13 (3–7)	21 – Waller	10 – Hargrove	4 – Reed	Humphrey Coliseum (8,854); Starkville, MS
February 18, 2010; 7:00 p.m.		at Florida	L 70–78	12–14 (3–8)	22 – Reed	7 – Waller	2 – Tied	O'Connell Center; Gainesville, FL
February 20, 2010; 7:00 p.m.		Arkansas	W 92–83	13–14 (4–8)	29 – Waller	8 – Hargrove	5 – Hargrove	Beard–Eaves–Memorial Coliseum (8,312); Auburn, AL
February 24, 2010; 8:00 p.m.		at Ole Miss	L 75–85	13–15 (3–9)	29 – Waller	5 – Tied	5 – Hargrove	Tad Smith Coliseum (5,608); Oxford, MS
February 27, 2010; 7:00 p.m.		LSU	W 74–59	14–15 (5–9)	26 – Waller	6 – Ross	6 – Hargrove	Beard–Eaves–Memorial Coliseum (8,927); Auburn, AL
March 3, 2010; 8:00 p.m.		Mississippi State	W 89–80	15–15 (6–9)	22 – Waller	7 – Tied	8 – Reed	Beard–Eaves–Memorial Coliseum (9,927); Auburn, AL
March 6, 2010; 1:47 p.m.		at Alabama	L 61–73	15–16 (6–10)	22 – Waller	6 – Hargrove	2 – Tied	Coleman Coliseum (15,383); Tuscalossa, AL
SEC Tournament
March 11, 2010; 7:30 p.m., SEC Network	(W5)	vs. (E4) Florida; SEC First Round	L 69–78	15–17	27 – Sullivan	9 – Hargrove	5 – Reed	Bridgestone Arena; Knoxville, TN
*Non-conference game. ^{#}Rankings from AP Poll. (#) Tournament seedings in parentheses. All times are in Central Time.

Schedule Source Source: 2009-10 Auburm Tigers basketball schedule
