= 2009–10 Florida Gators men's basketball team =

American college basketball season

2009–10 Florida Gators men's basketball

Legends Classic Champions

NCAA tournament, Round of 64
- Conference: Southeastern Conference
- East Division
- Record: 21–13 (9–7 SEC)
- Head coach: Billy Donovan
- Assistant coach: Larry Shyatt; Richard Pitino; Rob Lanier
- Home arena: O'Connell Center

2009–10 Southeastern Conference men's basketball standings
	Conf.				Overall
Team	W		L	PCT	W		L	PCT
East
No. 2 Kentucky†	14	–	2	.875	35	–	3	.921
No. 21 Vanderbilt	12	–	4	.750	24	–	9	.727
No. 15 Tennessee	11	–	5	.688	28	–	9	.757
Florida	9	–	7	.563	21	–	13	.618
South Carolina	6	–	10	.375	15	–	16	.484
Georgia	5	–	11	.313	14	–	17	.452
West
Mississippi State	9	–	7	.563	24	–	12	.667
Mississippi	9	–	7	.563	24	–	11	.686
Arkansas	7	–	9	.438	14	–	18	.438
Alabama	6	–	10	.375	17	–	15	.531
Auburn	6	–	10	.375	15	–	17	.469
LSU	2	–	14	.125	11	–	20	.355
† 2010 SEC tournament winner As of March 30, 2010; Rankings from AP Poll

The 2009–10 Florida Gators men's basketball team represented the University of Florida in the sport of basketball during the 2009–10 college basketball season. The Gators competed in Division I of the National Collegiate Athletic Association (NCAA) and the Eastern Division of the Southeastern Conference (SEC). They were led by head coach Billy Donovan, and played their home games in the O'Connell Center on the university's Gainesville, Florida campus.

The Gators finished the season 21–13, 9–7 in SEC play. They advanced to the quarterfinals of the 2010 SEC men's basketball tournament before losing to Mississippi State. They received an at–large bid to the NCAA tournament, their first appearance since their 2006–07 National Championship season, where they earned a No. 10 seed in the West Region. They were defeated in the first round by No. 7 seed BYU in double overtime.

== Class of 2009 ==
College recruiting
Name	Hometown	School	Height	Weight	Commit date
Kenny Boynton; SG	Plantation, Florida	American Heritage School	6 ft 2 in (1.88 m)	185 lb (84 kg)	Oct 30, 2008
Kenny Boynton; SG	Recruit ratings: Scout: Rivals: (98)				
Erik Murphy; PF	Southborough, Massachusetts	St. Mark's School	6 ft 9 in (2.06 m)	210 lb (95 kg)	Jan 16, 2008
Erik Murphy; PF	Recruit ratings: Scout: Rivals: (94)				
Overall Recruiting Rankings: Scout – 17 Rivals – 6 ESPN – 20

== Roster ==
Name	Number	Position	Height	Weight	Class	Hometown
Starters
Kenny Boynton	1	G	6–2	183	Freshman	Pompano Beach, Florida
Vernon Macklin	32	F	6–10	230	Redshirt Junior	Portsmouth, Virginia
Chandler Parsons	25	F	6–9	213	Junior	Winter Park, Florida
Alex Tyus	23	F	6–8	220	Junior	St. Louis, Missouri
Erving Walker	11	G	5–8	161	Sophomore	Brooklyn, New York
Reserves
Adam Allen	14	F	6–8	225	Redshirt Sophomore	Milton, Florida
Hudson Fricke	40	G	6–1	193	Junior	Greenville, South Carolina
Kenny Kadji	30	F/C	6–10	235	Sophomore	Douala, Cameroon
Kyle McClanahan	4	G	6–1	185	Sophomore	Maitland, Florida
Erik Murphy	33	F	6–9	217	Freshman	South Kingstown, Rhode Island
Ray Shipman	3	G/F	6–5	212	Sophomore	Miramar, Florida
Nimrod Tishman	42	G	6–8	182	Freshman	Tel Aviv, Israel
Dan Werner	21	F	6–7	230	Senior	Middletown, New Jersey

=== Coaches ===
Name	Type	College	Graduating year
Billy Donovan	Head coach	Providence College	1987
Larry Shyatt	Associate Head Coach	College of Wooster	1973
Richard Pitino	Assistant coach	Providence College	1995
Rob Lanier	Assistant coach	St. Bonaventure University	1990
Darren Hertz	Assistant to the Head Coach	University of Florida	1997
Adam Beaupre	Video Coordinator	University of Florida	1999
Matt Herring	Strength & Conditioning Coordinator	Texas State University	1994
Dave Werner	Athletic Trainer	Eastern Kentucky University	1991
Tom Williams	Academic Counselor	University of Florida	1978

== Schedule and results ==
Retrieved from Gatorzone.com

Date time, TV	Rank^{#}	Opponent^{#}	Result	Record	Site city, state
Exhibition
November 2, 2009*; 7:00 p.m.		Saint Leo	W 95–46		O'Connell Center; Gainesville, FL
November 9, 2009*; 7:00 p.m.		Webber International	W 104–53		O'Connell Center; Gainesville, FL
Non-conference season
November 15, 2009*; 4:00 p.m., FSN		Stetson	W 74–46	1–0	O'Connell Center; Gainesville, FL
November 18, 2009*; 7:00 p.m., FSN		Georgia Southern; Legends Classic	W 69–49	2–0	O'Connell Center; Gainesville, FL
November 20, 2009*; 7:00 p.m., FSN		Troy; Legends Classic	W 80–58	3–0	O'Connell Center; Gainesville, FL
November 24, 2009*; 7:00 p.m., FSN		Florida State	W 68–52	4–0	O'Connell Center; Gainesville, FL
November 27, 2009*; 8:00 p.m., Sun		vs. No. 2 Michigan State; Legends Classic	W 77–74	5–0	Boardwalk Hall; Atlantic City, NJ
November 28, 2009*; 8:00 p.m., FSN		vs. Rutgers; Legends Classic	W 73–58	6–0	Boardwalk Hall; Atlantic City, NJ
December 1, 2009*; 7:00 p.m., FSN	No. 13	Florida A&M	W 80–59	7–0	O'Connell Center; Gainesville, FL
December 4, 2009*; 7:00 p.m., FSN	No. 13	at Jacksonville	W 85–67	8–0	Veterans Memorial Arena; Jacksonville, FL
December 10, 2009*; 9:00 p.m., ESPN	No. 10	vs. No. 7 Syracuse; SEC/Big East Invitational	L 85–73	8–1	St. Pete Times Forum; Tampa, FL
December 19, 2009*; 6:30 p.m., Sun	No. 13	vs. Richmond; Orange Bowl Basketball Classic	L 56–53	8–2	BankAtlantic Center; Sunrise, FL
December 22, 2009*; 7:00 p.m., CSS	No. 18	South Alabama	L 67–66	8–3	O'Connell Center; Gainesville, FL
December 28, 2009*; 7:00 p.m., FSN		American	W 76–60	9–3	O'Connell Center; Gainesville, FL
December 30, 2009*; 7:00 p.m., CSS		Presbyterian	W 79–38	10–3	O'Connell Center; Gainesville, FL
January 3, 2010*; 3:00 p.m., FSN		at NC State	W 62–61 ^{OT}	11–3	RBC Center; Raleigh, NC
SEC conference play
January 9, 2010; 12:00 p.m., ESPN		at Vanderbilt	L 95–87	11–4 (0–1)	Memorial Gymnasium; Nashville, TN
January 12, 2010; 9:00 p.m., ESPN		No. 2 Kentucky	L 89–77	11–5 (0–2)	O'Connell Center; Gainesville, FL
January 16, 2010; 8:00 p.m., FSN		LSU	W 72–58	12–5 (1–2)	O'Connell Center; Gainesville, FL
January 21, 2010; 9:00 p.m., ESPN		at Arkansas	W 71–66	13–5 (2–2)	Bud Walton Arena; Fayetteville, AR
January 23, 2010; 6:00 p.m., ESPN		South Carolina	W 58–56	14–5 (3–2)	O'Connell Center; Gainesville, FL
January 27, 2010; 7:00 p.m., CSS		Georgia	W 87–71	15–5 (4–2)	O'Connell Center; Gainesville, FL
January 31, 2010; 1:00 p.m., CBS		at No. 14 Tennessee	L 61–60	15–6 (4–3)	Thompson-Boling Arena; Knoxville, TN
February 4, 2010; 7:00 p.m., ESPNU		at Alabama	W 66–65	16–6 (5–3)	Coleman Coliseum; Tuscaloosa, AL
February 6, 2010; 1:30 p.m., SECN		Mississippi State	W 69–62	17–6 (6–3)	O'Connell Center; Gainesville, FL
February 10, 2010; 8:00 p.m., SECN		at South Carolina	L 77–71	17–7 (6–4)	Colonial Life Arena; Columbia, SC
February 13, 2010*; 6:00 p.m., ESPN		Xavier	L 76–64	17–8 (6-4)	O'Connell Center; Gainesville, FL
February 18, 2010; 7:00 p.m., ESPN		Auburn	W 78–70	18–8 (7–4)	O'Connell Center; Gainesville, FL
February 20, 2010; 12:00 p.m., CBS		at Ole Miss	W 64–61	19–8 (8–4)	Tad Smith Coliseum; Oxford, MS
February 23, 2010; 9:00 p.m., ESPN		No. 19 Tennessee	W 75–62	20–8 (9–4)	O'Connell Center; Gainesville, FL
February 27, 2010; 4:00 p.m., SECN		at Georgia	L 78–76	20–9 (9–5)	Stegeman Coliseum; Athens, GA
March 2, 2010; 7:00 p.m., ESPN		No. 13 Vanderbilt	L 64–60	20–10 (9–6)	O'Connell Center; Gainesville, FL
March 7, 2010; 12:00 p.m., CBS		at No. 3 Kentucky	L 74–66	20–11 (9–7)	Rupp Arena; Lexington, KY
SEC tournament
March 11, 2010; 7:30 p.m., SECN	(4 E)	vs. (5 W) Auburn; First Round	W 78–69	21–11	Bridgestone Arena; Nashville, TN
March 12, 2010; 7:30 p.m., SECN	(4 E)	vs. (1 W) Mississippi State; Quarterfinals	L 75–69	21–12	Bridgestone Arena; Nashville, TN
NCAA tournament
March 18, 2010; 12:20 p.m., CBS	(10)	vs. (7) No. 17 BYU; First Round	L 99–92 ^{2OT}	21–13	Ford Center; Oklahoma City, OK
*Non-Conference Game. Rankings from AP poll. All times are in Eastern Time. Tournament seedings in parentheses.

== Rankings ==
Ranking movement Legend: ██ Increase in ranking. ██ Decrease in ranking. ██Not ranked the previous week.
Poll	Pre	Wk 1	Wk 2	Wk 3	Wk 4	Wk 5	Wk 6	Wk 7	Wk 8	Wk 9	Wk 10	Wk 11	Wk 12	Wk 13	Wk 14	Wk 15	Wk 16	Wk 17	Wk 18	Wk 19	Final
AP	NR	NR	NR	13	10	13	18	NR	NR	NR	NR	NR	NR	NR	NR	NR	NR	NR	NR	NR	NR
Coaches	NR	NR	NR	17	11	13	18	NR	NR	NR	NR	NR	NR	NR	NR	NR	NR	NR	NR	NR	NR
