= 2009–10 LSU Tigers basketball team =

American college basketball season

2009–2010 LSU Tigers basketball
- Conference: Southeastern Conference
- Record: 11–20 (2–14 SEC)
- Head coach: Trent Johnson (2nd season)
- Assistant coaches: Donny Guerinoni; Keith Richard; Brent Scott
- Home arena: Pete Maravich Assembly Center

2009–10 Southeastern Conference men's basketball standings
	Conf.				Overall
Team	W		L	PCT	W		L	PCT
East
No. 2 Kentucky†	14	–	2	.875	35	–	3	.921
No. 21 Vanderbilt	12	–	4	.750	24	–	9	.727
No. 15 Tennessee	11	–	5	.688	28	–	9	.757
Florida	9	–	7	.563	21	–	13	.618
South Carolina	6	–	10	.375	15	–	16	.484
Georgia	5	–	11	.313	14	–	17	.452
West
Mississippi State	9	–	7	.563	24	–	12	.667
Mississippi	9	–	7	.563	24	–	11	.686
Arkansas	7	–	9	.438	14	–	18	.438
Alabama	6	–	10	.375	17	–	15	.531
Auburn	6	–	10	.375	15	–	17	.469
LSU	2	–	14	.125	11	–	20	.355
† 2010 SEC tournament winner As of March 30, 2010; Rankings from AP Poll

The 2009–10 LSU Tigers men's basketball team represented the Louisiana State University in the 2009–10 college basketball season. The head coach was Trent Johnson, who was in his second season at LSU. The team played its home games in the Pete Maravich Assembly Center in Baton Rouge, Louisiana, and is a member of the Southeastern Conference. They finished the season 11–20, 2–14 in SEC play and lost in the first round of the 2010 SEC men's basketball tournament.

== Previous season ==
Trent Johnson completed his first season as head coach of the Tiger men's basketball team in 2009. His first season was very successful as the Tigers won the SEC West division title and the overall SEC regular-season title which earned them the #1 seed in the 2009 SEC men's basketball tournament. As a result of earning the top seed, the Tigers received a first-round bye. The Tigers defeated the Kentucky Wildcats in the second round 67–58. However, Mississippi St. proved to be too much in the semi-finals eliminating the Tigers 67–57.

After the SEC Tournament, the Tigers' fate was in the hands of the NCAA Tournament selection committee. The Tigers were awarded the #8 seed in the South bracket for the 2009 NCAA Men's Division I Basketball Tournament. This was the first time the Tigers had made the NCAA tournament since making it to 2006 Final Four. The Tigers had to travel to Greensboro, North Carolina to play the first two rounds of the tournament.

In the opening round of the tournament, LSU squared off against the #9 seed Butler, who finished the regular season 26–5. The Tigers seemed to be in control of the game leading by as much as 13, and by a score of 35–29 at the half. However, Butler continued to fight their way back using the size of Matt Howard who finished the game with 22. In the end, though, the Tigers were able to prevail 75–71 behind Marcus Thornton's 30 points.

The 2008–09 squad compiled and overall record of 27–8, including a 13–3 mark in SEC play.

== Preseason ==
The 2009–10 Tigers men's basketball team had a much different look than the team that competed in the previous season. The Tigers replaced the following seniors from 2008 to 2009:

- Chris Johnson, C, 2-year starter
- Garrett Temple, G, 4-year starter
- Marcus Thornton, G, drafted in the second round of the 2009 NBA draft by the Miami Heat
- Quinton Thornton, F, sixth man

However, Tasmin Mitchell decided to withdraw his name from the 2009 NBA draft and return to LSU for his red-shirt senior season. He joined junior Bo Spencer as the only two starters returning from last year.

=== Honors ===
Senior forward Tasmin Mitchell was the only Tiger to receive any preseason accolades. Mitchell was recently named to watchlist for the 2009–10 Naismith Award, as well as being rated the #4 small forward in college basketball by Rivals.com. During SEC media days prior to the season, Mitchell was named a unanimous First Team All-SEC selection by the SEC coaches.

=== Recruiting class ===
College recruiting information
Name	Hometown	School	Height	Weight	Commit date
Aaron Dotson; SG	Seattle, WA	Rainier Beach High School	6 ft 4 in (1.93 m)	194 lb (88 kg)	Oct 22, 2008
Aaron Dotson; SG	Recruit ratings: Scout: Rivals: (93)				
Eddie Ludwig; PF	Metairie, Louisiana	Metairie Park Country Day School	6 ft 7 in (2.01 m)	195 lb (88 kg)	Oct 13, 2008
Eddie Ludwig; PF	Recruit ratings: Scout: Rivals: (87)				
Overall recruit ranking: Scout: Not ranked Rivals: Not ranked
Note: In many cases, Scout, Rivals, 247Sports, On3, and ESPN may conflict in their listings of height and weight.; In these cases, the average was taken. ESPN grades are on a 100-point scale.; Sources: "LSU Commit List for 2009". Rivals.; "Men's Basketball Recruiting". Scout.; "College Basketball Recruiting Schools". ESPN.; "Scout.com Team Recruiting Rankings". Scout.; "2009 Team Ranking". Rivals.

== Roster ==
2009–10 LSU Tigers men's basketball team
Players
Coaches

Pos.	#	Name	Height	Weight	Year	Hometown
F	1	Tasmin Mitchell	6 ft 7 in (2.01 m)	245 lb (111 kg)	Sr	Denham Springs, Louisiana
F	3	Garrett Green	6 ft 11 in (2.11 m)	230 lb (104 kg)	So	Woodland Hills, California
G	4	Chris Bass	6 ft 1 in (1.85 m)	185 lb (84 kg)	So	Baton Rouge, Louisiana
F	5	Malcolm White	6 ft 9 in (2.06 m)	225 lb (102 kg)	Jr	Baton Rouge, Louisiana
G	10	Daron Populist	5 ft 10 in (1.78 m)	170 lb (77 kg)	Fr	Slidell, Louisiana
G	11	Bo Spencer	6 ft 2 in (1.88 m)	186 lb (84 kg)	Jr	Baton Rouge, Louisiana
G	12	Aaron Dotson	6 ft 4 in (1.93 m)	205 lb (93 kg)	Fr	Seattle, Washington
F	13	Eddie Ludwig	6 ft 9 in (2.06 m)	215 lb (98 kg)	Fr	Metairie, Louisiana
G	14	Chris Beattie	6 ft 4 in (1.93 m)	189 lb (86 kg)	Jr	Slidell, Louisiana
F	15	Dennis Harris	6 ft 11 in (2.11 m)	190 lb (86 kg)	Fr	Jonesboro, Georgia
G/F	1	Calvin Traxler	6 ft 5 in (1.96 m)	200 lb (91 kg)	Fr	Grand Rapids, Michigan
F	22	Taylor Jacobsen	6 ft 6 in (1.98 m)	205 lb (93 kg)	So	Charlotte, North Carolina
F	24	Storm Warren	6 ft 7 in (2.01 m)	230 lb (104 kg)	So	Monroe, Louisiana
G	30	Alex Farrer	6 ft 5 in (1.96 m)	200 lb (91 kg)	Sr	Baton Rouge, Louisiana

Head coach

- Trent Johnson (Boise State)

Assistant coach(es)

- Donny Guerinoni (Nevada)
- Keith Richard (Louisiana–Monroe)
- Brent Scott (Rice)

Legend

- (C) Team captain
- (S) Suspended
- (I) Ineligible
- (W) Walk-on
- Injured
- Current redshirt

Roster
Last update: November 11, 2009

== Schedule ==
2010 LSU Tigers basketball Game Log
Regular Season
November

#	Date	Time	Opponent^{#}	Rank	Location	TV	Attendance	Score	Overall Record	SEC Record
1	November 13	7:00 p.m.	Louisiana–Monroe		Maravich Center · Baton Rouge, Louisiana		9,081	82–62	1–0	–
2	November 16	7:00 p.m.	Indiana State		Maravich Center · Baton Rouge, Louisiana		8,113	56–45	2–0	–
3	November 17	7:00 p.m.	Western Kentucky		Maravich Center · Baton Rouge, Louisiana		8,220	71–60	3–0	–
4	November 25	6:00 p.m.	#13 Connecticut		Madison Square Garden · New York	ESPN2		55–81	3–1	-
5	November 27	1:30 p.m.	Arizona State		Madison Square Garden · New York	ESPN2		52–71	3–2	–

December

#	Date	Time	Opponent^{#}	Rank	Location	TV	Attendance	Score	Overall Record	SEC Record
6	December 1	6:30 p.m.	Louisiana-Lafayette		Maravich Center · Baton Rouge, Louisiana	CST	8,107	66–58	4–2	–
7	December 12	7:00 p.m.	Northwestern St.		Maravich Center · Baton Rouge, Louisiana		8,414	73–62	5–2	–
8	December 14	7:00 p.m.	Southeastern La		Maravich Center · Baton Rouge, Louisiana		8,003	77–60	6–2	–
9	December 17	7:00 p.m.	Nicholls St.		Maravich Center · Baton Rouge, Louisiana	CST	7,957	63–60	7–2	–
10	December 19	1:00 p.m.	Rice		Maravich Center · Baton Rouge, Louisiana	CST	8,629	65–61	8–2	–
11	December 22	9:00 p.m.	Washington St.		KeyArena · Seattle, WA		15,341	70–72 ^{OT}	8–3	–
12	December 29	6:00 p.m.	Xavier (Ohio)		Cintas Center · Cincinnati	ESPNU	10,250	65–89	8–4	–

January

#	Date	Time	Opponent^{#}	Rank	Location	TV	Attendance	Score	Overall Record	SEC Record
13	January 2	7:00 p.m.	Utah		Maravich Center · Baton Rouge, Louisiana	CSS	8,631	59–61	8–5	–
14	January 4	7:00 p.m.	McNeese St.		Maravich Center · Baton Rouge, Louisiana		7,807	83–60	9–5	–
15	January 9	4:00 p.m.	Alabama		Maravich Center · Baton Rouge, Louisiana	FSN	9,666	49–66	9–6	0–1
16	January 13	7:00 p.m.	South Carolina		Colonial Life Arena · Columbia, South Carolina	SECN	12,103	58–67	9–7	0–2
17	January 16	7:00 p.m.	Florida		O'Connell Center · Gainesville, Florida	FSN	11,627	58–72	9–8	0–3
18	January 20	7:00 p.m.	Auburn		Maravich Center · Baton Rouge, Louisiana	SECN	9,445	80–84	9–9	0–4
19	January 23	12:30 p.m.	#24 Ole Miss		Maravich Center · Baton Rouge, Louisiana	SECN	9,403	63–73	9–10	0–5
20	January 27	7:00 p.m.	Alabama		Coleman Coliseum · Tuscaloosa, AL	SECN	10,657	38–57	9–11	0–6
21	January 30	12:30 p.m.	Mississippi St.		Humphrey Coliseum · Starkville, Mississippi	SECN	7,247	51–67	9–12	0–7

February

#	Date	Time	Opponent^{#}	Rank	Location	TV	Attendance	Score	Overall Record	SEC Record
22	February 4	8:00 p.m.	#14 Tennessee		Maravich Center · Baton Rouge, Louisiana		9,052	54–59	9–13	0–8
23	February 6	3:00 p.m.	#4 Kentucky		Maravich Center · Baton Rouge, Louisiana	SECN	13,083	55–81	9–14	0–9
24	February 10	7:00 p.m.	Arkansas		Bud Walton Arena · Fayetteville, Arkansas	SECN	12,777	52–87	9–15	0–10
25	February 13	12:30 p.m.	Vanderbilt		Memorial Gymnasium · Nashville, Tennessee	SECN	14,316	69–77	9–16	0–11
26	February 20	3:00 p.m.	Mississippi St.		Maravich Center · Baton Rouge, Louisiana	SECN	9,434	59–60	9–17	0–12
27	February 24	7:00 p.m.	Arkansas		Maravich Center · Baton Rouge, Louisiana	SECN	8,463	65–54	10–17	1–12
28	February 27	6:00 p.m.	Auburn		Beard-Eaves-Memorial Coliseum · Auburn, AL	FSN	8,927	59–74	10–18	1–13

March

#	Date	Time	Opponent^{#}	Rank	Location	TV	Attendance	Score	Overall Record	SEC Record
29	March 4	8:00 p.m.	Ole Miss		Tad Smith Coliseum · Oxford, Mississippi		6,430	59–72	10–19	1–14
30	March 6	4:00 p.m.	Georgia		Maravich Center · Baton Rouge, Louisiana	FSN	9,328	50–48	11–19	2–14

Post-Season
SEC Tournament

#	Date	Time	Opponent^{#}	Rank	Location	TV	Attendance	Score	Overall Record
29	March 11	2:30 p.m.	#13 Tennessee		Bridgestone Arena · Nashville, Tennessee	SECN	15,152	49–59	11–20
