= 2009–10 Georgia Bulldogs basketball team =

American college basketball season

2009–10 Georgia Bulldogs men's basketball
- Conference: Southeastern Conference
- Eastern
- Record: 14–17 (5–11 SEC)
- Head coach: Mark Fox (1st season)
- Home arena: Stegeman Coliseum

2009–10 Southeastern Conference men's basketball standings
	Conf.				Overall
Team	W		L	PCT	W		L	PCT
East
No. 2 Kentucky†	14	–	2	.875	35	–	3	.921
No. 21 Vanderbilt	12	–	4	.750	24	–	9	.727
No. 15 Tennessee	11	–	5	.688	28	–	9	.757
Florida	9	–	7	.563	21	–	13	.618
South Carolina	6	–	10	.375	15	–	16	.484
Georgia	5	–	11	.313	14	–	17	.452
West
Mississippi State	9	–	7	.563	24	–	12	.667
Mississippi	9	–	7	.563	24	–	11	.686
Arkansas	7	–	9	.438	14	–	18	.438
Alabama	6	–	10	.375	17	–	15	.531
Auburn	6	–	10	.375	15	–	17	.469
LSU	2	–	14	.125	11	–	20	.355
† 2010 SEC tournament winner As of March 30, 2010; Rankings from AP Poll

The 2009–10 Georgia Bulldogs men's basketball team represented the University of Georgia during the 2009–10 NCAA Division I men's basketball season. The Bulldogs were led by first-year head coach Mark Fox. They played their home games at Stegeman Coliseum as members of the Southeastern Conference. They finished the season 14–17, 5–11 in SEC play and lost in the quarterfinals of the 2010 SEC men's basketball tournament to Vanderbilt.

== Previous season ==
The Bulldogs finished the 2008–09 season 12–20 overall and 3–13 in SEC play. They were not invited to the postseason. Midway through the season, head coach Dennis Felton was fired and replaced by interim head coach, Pete Herrmann. Following the conclusion of the season, the Bulldogs hired Nevada head coach, Mark Fox.

== Roster ==
2009–10 Georgia Bulldogs men's basketball team
Players
Coaches

Pos.	#	Name	Height	Weight	Year	Hometown
G	1	Travis Leslie	6 ft 4 in (1.93 m)	205 lb (93 kg)	So	Decatur, Georgia
G	3	Dustin Ware	5 ft 11 in (1.8 m)	172 lb (78 kg)	So	Powder Springs, Georgia
F	4	Chris Barnes	6 ft 8 in (2.03 m)	240 lb (109 kg)	Jr	Riverdale, Georgia
G	5	Ebuka Anyaorah	6 ft 4 in (1.93 m)	194 lb (88 kg)	Fr	Suwanee, Georgia
G	10	Ricky McPhee	6 ft 1 in (1.85 m)	184 lb (83 kg)	Sr	Lawrenceville, Georgia
G	11	Vincent Williams	6 ft 0 in (1.83 m)	165 lb (75 kg)	Fr	Homestead, Florida
G	12	Matt Bucklin	6 ft 0 in (1.83 m)	170 lb (77 kg)	So	Marietta, Georgia
F	20	Drazen Zlovaric	6 ft 9 in (2.06 m)	220 lb (100 kg)	So	Novi Sad, Serbia
F	25	Tyler Whatley	6 ft 7 in (2.01 m)	220 lb (100 kg)	Sr	Auburn, Georgia
F	33	Trey Thompkins	6 ft 10 in (2.08 m)	245 lb (111 kg)	So	Lithonia, Georgia
F	34	Albert Jackson	6 ft 11 in (2.11 m)	265 lb (120 kg)	Sr	Earlington, Kentucky
F	50	Jeremy Price	6 ft 8 in (2.03 m)	270 lb (122 kg)	Jr	Decatur, Georgia

Head coach

- Mark Fox (Eastern New Mexico)

Assistant coach(es)

{{{asst_coach}}}

Legend

- (C) Team captain
- (S) Suspended
- (I) Ineligible
- (W) Walk-on
- Injured
- Current redshirt

== Schedule ==
Date time, TV	Rank^{#}	Opponent^{#}	Result	Record	Site city, state
Non-conference regular season
November 13, 2009*; 7:00 pm		New Orleans	W 67–59	1–0	Stegeman Coliseum; Athens, GA
November 17, 2009*; 7:00 pm		Wofford	L 57–60	1–1	Stegeman Coliseum; Athens, GA
November 21, 2009*; 8:00 pm		at UAB	L 56–72	1–2	Bartow Arena; Birmingham, AL
November 24, 2009*; 7:00 pm		UNC Asheville	W 79–58	2–2	Stegeman Coliseum; Athens, GA
November 27, 2009*; 7:00 pm		Jacksonville State	W 67–64	3–2	Stegeman Coliseum; Athens, GA
December 2, 2009*; 7:00 pm		Saint Louis	W 64–56	4–2	Stegeman Coliseum; Athens, GA
December 6, 2009*; 3:30 pm		at Virginia Tech	L 62–74	4–3	Cassell Coliseum; Blacksburg, VA
December 9, 2009*; 7:00 pm		at St. John's; SEC-Big East Challenge	L 56–66	4–4	Madison Square Garden; New York, NY
December 19, 2009*; 7:00 pm		vs. Illinois	W 70–67	5–4	Arena at Gwinnett Center; Duluth, GA
December 23, 2009*; 7:00 pm		Florida Atlantic	W 77–60	6–4	Stegeman Coliseum; Athens, GA
December 30, 2009*; 7:00 pm		Pepperdine	W 64–47	7–4	Stegeman Coliseum; Athens, GA
January 2, 2010*; 4:00 pm		at Missouri	L 61–89	7–5	Mizzou Arena; Columbia, MO
January 5, 2010*; 7:00 pm		No. 20 Georgia Tech; Clean, Old-Fashioned Hate	W 73–66	8–5	Stegeman Coliseum; Athens, GA
SEC regular season
January 9, 2010; 4:00 pm		at No. 3 Kentucky	L 68–76	8–6 (0–1)	Rupp Arena; Lexington, KY
January 13, 2010; 8:00 pm		No. 21 Ole Miss	L 76–80	8–7 (0–2)	Stegeman Coliseum; Athens, GA
January 16, 2010; 3:00 pm		at Mississippi State	L 69–72	8–8 (0–3)	Humphrey Coliseum; Starkville, MS
January 23, 2010; 5:00 pm		No. 8 Tennessee	W 78–63	9–8 (1–3)	Stegeman Coliseum; Athens, GA
January 27, 2010; 7:00 pm		at Florida	L 71–87	9–9 (1–4)	O'Connell Center; Gainesville, FL
January 30, 2010; 7:00 pm		at South Carolina	L 77–78	9–10 (1–5)	Colonial Life Arena; Columbia, SC
February 3, 2010; 7:00 pm		Arkansas	L 68–72	9–11 (1–6)	Stegeman Coliseum; Athens, GA
February 6, 2010; 8:00 pm		No. 18 Vanderbilt	W 72–58	10–11 (2–6)	Stegeman Coliseum; Athens, GA
February 10, 2010; 9:00 pm		at Auburn	L 63–82	10–12 (2–7)	Beard–Eaves–Memorial Coliseum; Auburn, AL
February 13, 2010; 4:00 pm		South Carolina	W 66–61	11–12 (3–7)	Stegeman Coliseum; Athens, GA
February 17, 2010; 8:00 pm		at No. 20 Tennessee	L 60–69	11–13 (3–8)	Thompson–Boling Arena; Knoxville, TN
February 20, 2010; 7:00 pm		Alabama	W 76–70	12–13 (4–8)	Stegeman Coliseum; Athens, GA
February 25, 2010; 7:00 pm		at No. 16 Vanderbilt	L 94–96 ^{OT}	12–14 (4–9)	Memorial Gymnasium; Nashville, TN
February 27, 2010; 4:00 pm		Florida	W 78–76	13–14 (5–9)	Stegeman Coliseum; Athens, GA
March 3, 2010; 8:00 pm		No. 3 Kentucky	L 68–80	13–15 (5–10)	Stegeman Coliseum; Athens, GA
March 6, 2010; 5:00 pm		at LSU	L 48–50	13–16 (5–11)	Pete Maravich Assembly Center; Baton Rouge, LA
SEC tournament
March 11, 2010; 9:45 pm	(E6)	vs. (W3) Arkansas; SEC First Round	W 77–64	14–16	Bridgestone Arena; Nashville, TN
March 12, 2010; 9:45 pm	(E6)	vs. (E2) No. 20 Vanderbilt; Quarterfinals	L 66–78	14–17	Bridgestone Arena; Nashville, TN
*Non-conference game. ^{#}Rankings from AP Poll. (#) Tournament seedings in parentheses.
