= 2009–10 Tennessee Volunteers basketball team =

American college basketball season

2009–10 Tennessee Volunteers men's basketball

NCAA tournament, Elite Eight
- Conference: Southeastern Conference
- East

Ranking
- Coaches: No. 9
- AP: No. 15
- Record: 28–9 (11–5 SEC)
- Head coach: Bruce Pearl (5th season)
- Assistant coaches: Tony Jones; Steve Forbes; Jason Shay
- Home arena: Thompson-Boling Arena

2009–10 Southeastern Conference men's basketball standings
| | Conf. | | | | Overall |
| Team | W | | L | PCT | W | | L | PCT |
|---|---|---|---|---|---|---|---|---|
East
| No. 2 Kentucky† | 14 | – | 2 | .875 | 35 | – | 3 | .921 |
| No. 21 Vanderbilt | 12 | – | 4 | .750 | 24 | – | 9 | .727 |
| No. 15 Tennessee | 11 | – | 5 | .688 | 28 | – | 9 | .757 |
| Florida | 9 | – | 7 | .563 | 21 | – | 13 | .618 |
| South Carolina | 6 | – | 10 | .375 | 15 | – | 16 | .484 |
| Georgia | 5 | – | 11 | .313 | 14 | – | 17 | .452 |
West
| Mississippi State | 9 | – | 7 | .563 | 24 | – | 12 | .667 |
| Mississippi | 9 | – | 7 | .563 | 24 | – | 11 | .686 |
| Arkansas | 7 | – | 9 | .438 | 14 | – | 18 | .438 |
| Alabama | 6 | – | 10 | .375 | 17 | – | 15 | .531 |
| Auburn | 6 | – | 10 | .375 | 15 | – | 17 | .469 |
| LSU | 2 | – | 14 | .125 | 11 | – | 20 | .355 |
† 2010 SEC tournament winner As of March 30, 2010; Rankings from AP Poll

The 2009–10 Tennessee Volunteers basketball team represented the University of Tennessee in the 2009-10 NCAA Division I men's basketball season. This was the fifth season for Bruce Pearl as the Volunteers' head coach. The team, a member of the Eastern Division of the Southeastern Conference, played its home games at Thompson-Boling Arena. They finished the season 28–9, 11–5 in SEC play and advanced to the semifinals of the 2010 SEC men's basketball tournament before losing to Kentucky. They received an at-large bid to the 2010 NCAA Division I men's basketball tournament, earning a 6 seed in the Midwest Region. They defeated 11 seed San Diego State in the first round and 14 seed Ohio to advance to the Sweet Sixteen. In the regional semifinal they defeated 2 seed and AP #5 Ohio State to advance to the first Elite Eight in school history. They were defeated by 5 seed and AP #13 Michigan State in the regional final to end their season.

== Preseason ==
The 2008–09 Volunteers finished the season 21–13 overall, against the second-rated schedule in the nation, with a 10–6 mark in conference play. The Vols won the SEC East crown and appeared in the SEC Championship Game for the first time since 1991. In postseason play, the Volunteers earned a number 9 seed in the NCAA tournament. The team went on to lose in the first round to the Oklahoma State Cowboys and finished the season unranked.

The Vols lost several players during the off-season. Two seniors from the team graduated: Tanner Wild and Ryan Childress. Philip Jurick did not return to the team and Daniel West did not have his scholarship extended due to being academically ineligible. Also, sophomore forward Emmanuel Negedu underwent surgery and will not play for the 2009–10 season. Negedu had to have a sub-pectoral implantable cardiac defibrillator implanted after suffering a cardiac arrest after a workout in the Neyland-Thompson Sports Complex on September 28, 2009. On October 28, 2009, senior guard Josh Tabb, who was indefinitely suspended on September 18, returned to Illinois in order to care after his ailing mother.

On November 2, 2009, the SEC released the rosters for the All-SEC first and second teams. Senior guard/forward Tyler Smith was chosen for the first team All-SEC. Wayne Chism was selected for the second team All-SEC.

On January 1, 2010, Tyler Smith, Cameron Tatum, Brian Williams, and Melvin Goins were arrested for weapons charges and marijuana possession. Coach Bruce Pearl suspended the four players. Tyler Smith was dismissed from the team, and the three other players have since been reinstated.

== Class of 2009 Signees ==
College recruiting information
| Name | Hometown | School | Height | Weight | Commit date |
|---|---|---|---|---|---|
| Kenny Hall; PF | Stone Mountain, Georgia | Redan High School | 6 ft 8 in (2.03 m) | 215 lb (98 kg) | Mar 2, 2008 |
| Kenny Hall; PF | Recruit ratings: Scout: Rivals: (92) | | | | |
| Melvin Goins; PG | San Diego, California | Mt. San Jacinto College (CA) | 5 ft 11 in (1.80 m) | 185 lb (84 kg) | |
| Melvin Goins; PG | Recruit ratings: Rivals: | | | | |
Overall recruit ranking:
Note: In many cases, Scout, Rivals, 247Sports, On3, and ESPN may conflict in their listings of height and weight.; In these cases, the average was taken. ESPN grades are on a 100-point scale.; Sources: "Tennessee 2009 Basketball Commitments". Rivals.; "2009 Tennessee Basketball Commits". Scout.; "ESPN". ESPN.; "Scout.com Team Recruiting Rankings". Scout.; "2009 Team Ranking". Rivals.

== 2009–10 Roster ==
| Name | Number | Position | Height | Weight | Year | Hometown | Former School |
|---|---|---|---|---|---|---|---|
| Renaldo Woolridge | 0 | PF/SF | 6'8" | 208 | Sophomore | Sherman Oaks, California | Harvard-Westlake |
| Bobby Maze | 3 | PG | 6'3" | 195 | Senior | Suitland, Maryland | Hutchinson (Kan.) C.C. |
| Wayne Chism | 4 | C/PF | 6'9" | 246 | Senior | Jackson, Tennessee | Bolivar Central |
| Emmanuel Negedu | 5 | PF | 6'7" | 218 | Sophomore | Kaduna, Nigeria | Brewster (N.H.) Academy |
| Michael Hubert | 10 | G | 6'2" | 203 | Junior | Hendersonville, Tennessee | University of Tennessee at Chattanooga |
| Quinn Cannington | 11 | SG | 6'4" | 165 | Senior | Knoxville, Tennessee | Fulton |
| Skylar McBee | 13 | SG | 6'3" | 190 | Freshman | Rutledge, Tennessee | Grainger County High School |
| Kenny Hall | 20 | PF | 6'8" | 220 | Freshman | Stone Mountain, Georgia | Redan High School |
| Melvin Goins | 21 | PG | 5'11" | 195 | Junior | San Diego, California | Mt. San Jacinto (Calif.) College |
| Steven Pearl | 22 | SF | 6'5" | 232 | Junior | Knoxville, Tennessee | West |
| Cameron Tatum | 23 | SG | 6'6" | 197 | Sophomore | Lithonia, Georgia | The Patterson School |
| Josh Bone | 24 | G | 6'3" | 195 | Junior | Nashville, Tennessee | Southern Illinois University |
| J. P. Prince | 30 | G/F | 6'7" | 205 | Senior | Memphis, Tennessee | Arizona |
| Scotty Hopson | 32 | SG | 6'7" | 200 | Sophomore | Hopkinsville, Kentucky | University Heights |
| Brian Williams | 33 | C | 6'10" | 278 | Junior | Bronx, New York | Harmony Community Prep |

== 2009–10 Schedule ==
| Date time, TV | Rank^{#} | Opponent^{#} | Result | Record | Site (attendance) city, state |
Exhibition
| October 30*; 7:30 pm | No. 10 | North Alabama | W 117–79 | | Thompson-Boling Arena (18,362); Knoxville, TN |
| November 4*; 7:30 pm | No. 10 | Lincoln Memorial | W 97–58 | | Thompson-Boling Arena (17,924); Knoxville, TN |
Regular season
| November 13*; 7:00 pm, SportSouth | No. 10 | Austin Peay | W 83–54 | 1–0 | Thompson-Boling Arena (17,963); Knoxville, TN |
| November 17*; 7:00 pm, FSN | No. 10 | UNC-Asheville | W 124–49 | 2–0 | Thompson-Boling Arena (17,085); Knoxville, TN |
| November 20*; 3:30 pm | No. 10 | vs. East Carolina; Paradise Jam Round 1 | W 105–66 | 3–0 | Sports and Fitness Center (3,117); St. Thomas, Virgin Islands |
| November 22*; 6:00 pm, FCS | No. 10 | vs. DePaul; Paradise Jam Semifinal | W 57–53 | 4–0 | Sports and Fitness Center (3,222); St. Thomas, Virgin Islands |
| November 23*; 8:30 pm, FCS | No. 9 | vs. No. 7 Purdue; Paradise Jam Final | L 73–72 | 4–1 | Sports and Fitness Center (3,755); St. Thomas, Virgin Islands |
| November 27*; 7:00 pm, CSS | No. 9 | College of Charleston | W 86–69 | 5–1 | Thompson-Boling Arena (18,293); Knoxville, TN |
| December 2*; 7:00 pm, SportsSouth | No. 11 | ETSU | W 78–66 | 6–1 | Thompson-Boling Arena (17,512); Knoxville, TN |
| December 11*; 7:00 pm, CSS | No. 9 | vs. MTSU; Sun Belt Classic | W 75–54 | 7–1 | Sommet Center (14,516); Nashville, TN |
| December 15*; 7:00 pm, ESPNU | No. 9 | Wyoming | W 77–58 | 8–1 | Thompson-Boling Arena (17,274); Knoxville, TN |
| December 19*; 4:30 pm, FSN | No. 9 | at USC | L 77–55 | 8–2 | Galen Center (4,523); Los Angeles, CA |
| December 23*; 7:00 pm, CSS | No. 16 | North Carolina A&T | W 99–78 | 9–2 | Thompson-Boling Arena (17,759); Knoxville, TN |
| December 31*; 4:00 pm, ESPN2 | No. 14 | at Memphis | W 66–59 | 10–2 | FedExForum (17,544); Memphis, TN |
| January 6*; 7:00 pm, CSS | No. 16 | Charlotte | W 88–71 | 11–2 | Thompson-Boling Arena (17,023); Knoxville, TN |
| January 10*; 4:30 pm, CBS | No. 16 | No. 1 Kansas | W 76–68 | 12–2 | Thompson-Boling Arena (21,936); Knoxville, TN |
| January 14; 7:00 pm, ESPN2 | No. 9 | Auburn | W 81–55 | 13–2 (1–0) | Thompson-Boling Arena (20,368); Knoxville, TN |
| January 16; 1:30 pm, SEC Network | No. 9 | No. 21 Mississippi | W 71–69 ^{OT} | 14–2 (2–0) | Thompson-Boling Arena (20,714); Knoxville, TN |
| January 19; 7:00 pm, ESPN | No. 8 | at Alabama | W 63–56 | 15–2 (3–0) | Coleman Coliseum (12,098); Tuscaloosa, AL |
| January 23; 5:00 pm, FSN South | No. 8 | at Georgia | L 78–63 | 15–3 (3–1) | Stegeman Coliseum (10,523); Athens, GA |
| January 27; 7:00 pm, ESPNU | No. 14 | No. 21 Vanderbilt | L 85–76 | 15–4 (3–2) | Thompson-Boling Arena (19,103); Knoxville, TN |
| January 31; 1:00 pm, CBS | No. 14 | Florida | W 60–61 | 16–4 (4–2) | Thompson-Boling Arena (21,208); Knoxville, TN |
| February 4; 9:00 pm, ESPN2 | No. 14 | at LSU | W 59–54 | 17–4 (5–2) | Pete Maravich Assembly Center (9,052); Baton Rouge, LA |
| February 6; 6:00 pm, ESPN | No. 14 | South Carolina | W 79–53 | 18–4 (6–2) | Thompson-Boling Arena (21,003); Knoxville, TN |
| February 9; 7:00 pm, ESPN | No. 12 | at No. 22 Vanderbilt | L 90–71 | 18–5 (6–3) | Memorial Gymnasium (14,316); Nashville, TN |
| February 13; 9:00 pm, ESPN | No. 12 | at No. 3 Kentucky; ESPN College GameDay | L 73–62 | 18–6 (6–4) | Rupp Arena (24,402); Lexington, KY |
| February 17; 8:00 pm, SEC Network | No. 20 | Georgia | W 60–69 | 19–6 (7–4) | Thompson-Boling Arena (18,086); Knoxville, TN |
| February 20; 1:30 pm, SEC Network | No. 20 | South Carolina | W 63–55 | 20–6 (8–4) | Colonial Life Arena (15,622); Columbia, SC |
| February 23; 9:00 pm, ESPN | No. 19 | at Florida | L 75–62 | 20–7 (8–5) | O'Connell Center (11,273); Gainesville, FL |
| February 27; 12:00 pm, CBS | No. 19 | No. 2 Kentucky | W 74–65 | 21–7 (9–5) | Thompson-Boling Arena (21,214); Knoxville, TN |
| March 3; 7:00 pm, CSS | No. 16 | Arkansas | W 80–73 | 22–7 (10–5) | Thompson-Boling Arena (20,139); Knoxville, TN |
| March 6; 6:00 pm, ESPN | No. 16 | at Mississippi State | W 75-59 | 23–7 (11–5) | Humphrey Coliseum (10,021); Starkville, MS |
2010 SEC tournament
| March 11; 3:15 pm, SEC Network | (E3) No. 15 | vs. (W6) LSU; First Round | W 59–49 | 24–7 | Bridgestone Arena (15,152); Nashville, TN |
| March 12; 3:30 pm, SEC Network | (E3) No. 15 | vs. (W2) Mississippi; Quarterfinals | W 76–65 | 25–7 | Bridgestone Arena (19,123); Nashville, TN |
| March 13; 1:00 pm, ABC | (E3) No. 15 | vs. (E1) No. 2 Kentucky; Semifinals | L 74–45 | 25–8 | Bridgestone Arena (20,207); Nashville, TN |
2010 NCAA tournament
| March 18; 9:45 pm, CBS | (6 MW) No. 15 | vs. (11 MW) San Diego State; First Round | W 62–59 | 26–8 | Dunkin' Donuts Center (10,788); Providence, RI |
| March 20; 3:35 pm, CBS | (6 MW) No. 15 | vs. (14 MW) Ohio; Second Round | W 83–68 | 27–8 | Dunkin' Donuts Center (11,271); Providence, RI |
| March 26; 7:07 pm, CBS | (6 MW) No. 15 | vs. (2 MW) No. 5 Ohio State; Sweet Sixteen | W 76–73 | 28–8 | Edward Jones Dome (26,377); St. Louis, MO |
| March 28; 2:20 pm, CBS | (6 MW) No. 15 | vs. (5 MW) No. 13 Michigan State; Elite Eight | L 70–69 | 28–9 | Edward Jones Dome (25,242); St. Louis, MO |
*Non-conference game. ^{#}Rankings from AP Poll. (#) Tournament seedings in parentheses. All times are in Eastern Time.

== See also ==
- 2009–10 Tennessee Lady Volunteers basketball team
