= 2009–10 Mississippi State Bulldogs basketball team =

American college basketball season

2009–10 Mississippi State Bulldogs men's basketball

SEC West Division champions

NIT, Second round
- Conference: Southeastern Conference
- West
- Record: 24–12 (9–7 SEC)
- Head coach: Rick Stansbury (12th season)
- Assistant coaches: Robert Kirby; Phil Cunningham; Marcus Grant
- Home arena: Humphrey Coliseum

2009–10 Southeastern Conference men's basketball standings
| | Conf. | | | | Overall |
| Team | W | | L | PCT | W | | L | PCT |
|---|---|---|---|---|---|---|---|---|
East
| No. 2 Kentucky† | 14 | – | 2 | .875 | 35 | – | 3 | .921 |
| No. 21 Vanderbilt | 12 | – | 4 | .750 | 24 | – | 9 | .727 |
| No. 15 Tennessee | 11 | – | 5 | .688 | 28 | – | 9 | .757 |
| Florida | 9 | – | 7 | .563 | 21 | – | 13 | .618 |
| South Carolina | 6 | – | 10 | .375 | 15 | – | 16 | .484 |
| Georgia | 5 | – | 11 | .313 | 14 | – | 17 | .452 |
West
| Mississippi State | 9 | – | 7 | .563 | 24 | – | 12 | .667 |
| Mississippi | 9 | – | 7 | .563 | 24 | – | 11 | .686 |
| Arkansas | 7 | – | 9 | .438 | 14 | – | 18 | .438 |
| Alabama | 6 | – | 10 | .375 | 17 | – | 15 | .531 |
| Auburn | 6 | – | 10 | .375 | 15 | – | 17 | .469 |
| LSU | 2 | – | 14 | .125 | 11 | – | 20 | .355 |
† 2010 SEC tournament winner As of March 30, 2010; Rankings from AP Poll

The 2009–10 Mississippi State Bulldogs men's basketball team represented Mississippi State University in the 2009–10 college basketball season. This was head coach Rick Stansbury's twelfth season at Mississippi State. The Bulldogs competed in the Southeastern Conference and played their home games at Humphrey Coliseum, nicknamed The Hump. They finished the season 24–12, 9–7 in SEC play. They advanced to the championship game where they were defeated by Kentucky in overtime. They were invited to the 2010 National Invitation Tournament where they advanced to the second round before being defeated by North Carolina.

== Previous season ==
The 2008–09 Bulldogs finished the season 23–13 (9–7 in SEC play). The Bulldogs won the 2009 SEC men's basketball tournament, allowing them to advance to the NCAA Tournament, where they lost to Washington in the Round of 64.

== Before the season ==
=== Departures ===
Four players from the 2008–09 team did not return for this season.

| Name | Number | Pos. | Height | Weight | Year | Hometown | Notes |
|---|---|---|---|---|---|---|---|
| Christopher Gay | 10 | Guard | 6'0" | 165 | Senior | Hattiesburg, MS | Graduated (Walk-on) |
| Jacquiese Holcombe | 1 | Forward | 6'6" | 205 | Junior | College Park, GA | Transferred to West Texas A&M |
| Brian Johnson | 44 | Forward | 6'9" | 245 | Senior | Laurinburg, NC | Graduated |
| Rod Bryant | 14 | Guard | 6'1" | 165 | Sophomore | Birmingham, AL | Left team (Walk-on) |

=== Recruits ===
College recruiting information
| Name | Hometown | School | Height | Weight | Commit date |
|---|---|---|---|---|---|
| Wendell Lewis; C | Selma, AL | Selma HS | 6 ft 8 in (2.03 m) | 220 lb (100 kg) | Apr 22, 2009 |
| Wendell Lewis; C | Recruit ratings: Scout: Rivals: | | | | |
| John Riek; C | Khartoum, Sudan | IMG Academy | 7 ft 2 in (2.18 m) | 240 lb (110 kg) | May 15, 2009 |
| John Riek; C | Recruit ratings: Scout: Rivals: | | | | |
| Renardo Sidney; PF | Jackson, MS | Fairfax HS (Calif.) | 6 ft 11 in (2.11 m) | 255 lb (116 kg) | Apr 30, 2009 |
| Renardo Sidney; PF | Recruit ratings: Scout: Rivals: | | | | |
| Shaun Smith; SG | Brooksville, MS | Noxubee County HS | 6 ft 5 in (1.96 m) | 180 lb (82 kg) | Sep 23, 2008 |
| Shaun Smith; SG | Recruit ratings: Scout: Rivals: | | | | |
Overall recruit ranking: Scout: 19 Rivals: 21
Note: In many cases, Scout, Rivals, 247Sports, On3, and ESPN may conflict in their listings of height and weight.; In these cases, the average was taken. ESPN grades are on a 100-point scale.; Sources: "Mississippi State 2009 Basketball Commitments". Rivals.; "2009 Mississippi State Basketball Commits". Scout.; "ESPN". ESPN.; "Scout.com Team Recruiting Rankings". Scout.; "2009 Team Ranking". Rivals.

== Roster ==
Because the Bulldogs were one player above the scholarship limit, Jarvis Varnado gave his scholarship up so that no one on the team would have to leave, making him a walk-on. Renardo Sidney was suspended for the entire season over recruitment violations.

2009–10 Mississippi State Bulldogs men's basketball team
Players
Coaches

| Pos. | # | Name | Height | Weight | Year | Previous school | Hometown |
|---|---|---|---|---|---|---|---|
| F | 1 | Renardo Sidney (I) | 6 ft 10 in (2.08 m) | 260 lb (118 kg) | Fr | Fairfax HS (Calif.) | Jackson, MS |
| G | 2 | Ravern Johnson | 6 ft 7 in (2.01 m) | 175 lb (79 kg) | Jr | Coahoma County HS | Lyon, MS |
| G | 3 | Dee Bost | 6 ft 2 in (1.88 m) | 170 lb (77 kg) | So | Concord HS | Concord, NC |
| G | 4 | Twany Beckham (injured) (redshirt) | 6 ft 5 in (1.96 m) | 190 lb (86 kg) | So | Ballard HS | Louisville, KY |
| F | 5 | Romero Osby | 6 ft 8 in (2.03 m) | 230 lb (104 kg) | So | Northeast Lauderdale HS | Meridian, MS |
| G | 10 | Shaun Smith (redshirt) | 6 ft 6 in (1.98 m) | 195 lb (88 kg) | Fr | Noxubee County HS | Brooksville, MS |
| G | 12 | Charles Parker (W) | 5 ft 10 in (1.78 m) | 154 lb (70 kg) | Fr | McKinney North HS | McKinney, TX |
| G | 15 | Riley Benock | 6 ft 4 in (1.93 m) | 180 lb (82 kg) | Jr | Meade County HS | Battletown, KY |
| F | 20 | Taylor Luczak (W) | 6 ft 8 in (2.03 m) | 220 lb (100 kg) | RS So | Glens Falls HS | Glens Falls, NY |
| G | 21 | Baxter Price (W) | 5 ft 9 in (1.75 m) | 145 lb (66 kg) | Fr | Northwest Rankin HS | Brandon, MS |
| G | 22 | Barry Stewart | 6 ft 3 in (1.91 m) | 170 lb (77 kg) | Sr | Shelbyville Central HS | Shelbyville, TN |
| F | 24 | Kodi Augustus | 6 ft 8 in (2.03 m) | 220 lb (100 kg) | Jr | Maine Central Institute | Baton Rouge, LA |
| G | 25 | Phil Turner | 6 ft 3 in (1.91 m) | 170 lb (77 kg) | RS Jr | Grenada HS | Grenada, MS |
| C | 30 | Wendell Lewis | 6 ft 8 in (2.03 m) | 240 lb (109 kg) | Fr | Selma HS | Selma, AL |
| F | 32 | Jarvis Varnado (W) | 6 ft 9 in (2.06 m) | 230 lb (104 kg) | Sr | Haywood HS | Brownsville, TN |
| G | 33 | Brandon Bolen (W) | 6 ft 3 in (1.91 m) | 195 lb (88 kg) | Jr | Madison-Ridgeland Academy | Madison, MS |
| F | 45 | Elgin Bailey (injured) (redshirt) | 6 ft 8 in (2.03 m) | 265 lb (120 kg) | Jr | Belaire HS | New Orleans, LA |
| F | 50 | John Riek | 7 ft 1 in (2.16 m) | 242 lb (110 kg) | Fr | IMG Academy | Khartoum, Sudan |

Head coach

- Rick Stansbury (Campbellsville)

Assistant coach(es)

- Phil Cunningham (Campbellsville)
- Marcus Grant (Mississippi State)
- Robert Kirby (UTPA)

Legend

- (C) Team captain
- (S) Suspended
- (I) Ineligible
- (W) Walk-on
- Injured
- Current redshirt

Roster

== Rankings ==
Ranking movement Legend: ██ Improvement in ranking. ██ Decrease in ranking. ██ Not ranked the previous week. RV=Others receiving votes.
| Poll | Pre | Wk 1 | Wk 2 | Wk 3 | Wk 4 | Wk 5 | Wk 6 | Wk 7 | Wk 8 | Wk 9 | Wk 10 | Wk 11 | Wk 12 | Wk 13 | Wk 14 | Wk 15 | Wk 16 | WK 17 | Wk 18 | Final |
|---|---|---|---|---|---|---|---|---|---|---|---|---|---|---|---|---|---|---|---|---|
| AP | 18 | RV | RV | -- | -- | RV | RV | RV | RV | RV | 23 | RV | -- | -- | RV | RV | RV | -- | RV | |
| Coaches | 19 | RV | -- | -- | -- | RV | RV | -- | RV | RV | RV | RV | -- | -- | -- | -- | -- | -- | -- | |

== Schedule and results ==
- All times are Central

| Date time, TV | Rank^{#} | Opponent^{#} | Result | Record | Site (attendance) city, state |
Exhibition
| 10/31/2009; 2:00pm | No. 18 | Oklahoma City | W 82–54 | | The Hump (2,938); Starkville, MS |
| 11/7/2009; 2:00pm | No. 18 | Georgetown (KY) | W 90–70 | | The Hump (2,995); Starkville, MS |
Regular Season
| 11/13/2009*; 8:00pm | No. 18 | Rider | L 74–88 | 0–1 | The Hump (7,241); Starkville, MS |
| 11/19/2009*; 7:00pm | | Southeastern Louisiana | W 82–67 | 1–1 | The Hump (4,544); Starkville, MS |
| 11/21/2009*; 6:00pm | | Bethune-Cookman; South Padre Island Invitational | W 67–51 | 2–1 | The Hump (3,721); Starkville, MS |
| 11/24/2009*; 7:00pm | | Texas–Pan American; South Padre Island Invitational | W 75–50 | 3–1 | The Hump (3,214); Starkville, MS |
| 11/27/2009*; 5:00pm, FCS | | vs. Richmond; South Padre Island Invitational | L 62–63 | 3–2 | South Padre Island Convention Centre (585); South Padre Island, TX |
| 11/28/2009*; 4:30pm | | vs. Old Dominion; South Padre Island Invitational | W 69–55 | 4–2 | South Padre Island Convention Centre (543); South Padre Island, TX |
| 12/5/2009*; 1:00pm | | St. Bonaventure | W 105–53 | 5–2 | The Hump (3,344); Starkville, MS |
| 12/10/2009*; 6:30pm, ESPN2 | | vs. DePaul; SEC/Big East Challenge | W 76–45 | 6–2 | St. Pete Times Forum (9,353); Tampa, FL |
| 12/12/2009*; 1:30pm, FSW | | vs. UCLA; John R. Wooden Classic | W 72–54 | 7–2 | Honda Center (13,043); Anaheim, CA |
| 12/16/2009*; 6:00pm, ESPN2 | | Wright State | W 80–69 | 8–2 | The Hump (4,721); Starkville, MS |
| 12/19/2009*; 1:00pm, CCS | | at Houston | W 70–64 | 9–2 | Hofheinz Pavilion (3,422); Houston, TX |
| 12/22/2009*; 7:00pm | | vs. Centenary | W 88–51 | 10–2 | Mississippi Coliseum (5,502); Jackson, MS |
| 12/28/2009*; 7:00pm | | Mississippi Valley State | W 73–45 | 11–2 | The Hump (5,421); Starkville, MS |
| 12/31/2009*; 6:00pm | | at San Diego | W 77–68 | 12–2 | Jenny Craig Pavilion (1,630); San Diego, CA |
| 1/4/2010*; 8:00pm, CSS | | at Western Kentucky | L 52–55 | 12–3 | E. A. Diddle Arena (5,925); Bowling Green, KY |
| 1/9/2010; 12:45pm, SEC Network | | at No. 14 Ole Miss | W 80–75 | 13–3 (1–0) | Tad Smith Coliseum (9,360); Oxford, MS |
| 1/14/2010; 6:00pm, ESPNU | | Arkansas | W 82–80 | 14–3 (2–0) | The Hump (8,339); Starkville, MS |
| 1/16/2010; 2:00pm, ESPN2 | | Georgia | W 72–69 | 15–3 (3–0) | The Hump (7,682); Starkville, MS |
| 1/23/2010; 11:00am, CBS | No. 23 | at Alabama | L 57–62 | 15–4 (3–1) | Coleman Coliseum (12,336); Tuscaloosa, AL |
| 1/28/2010; 8:00pm, ESPN2 | | at Arkansas | L 62–67 | 15–5 (3–2) | Bud Walton Arena (12,803); Fayetteville, AR |
| 1/30/2010; 12:30pm, SEC Network | | LSU | W 67–51 | 16–5 (4–2) | The Hump (7,247); Starkville, MS |
| 2/3/2010; 7:00pm, SEC Network | | at No. 18 Vanderbilt | L 72–75 | 16–6 (4–3) | Memorial Gymnasium (14,316); Nashville, TN |
| 2/6/2010; 12:30pm, SEC Network | | at Florida | L 62–69 | 16–7 (4–4) | O'Connell Center (11,660); Gainesville, FL |
| 2/11/2010; 8:00pm, ESPN2 | | Ole Miss | W 71–63 | 17–7 (5–4) | The Hump (9,401); Starkville, MS |
| 2/13/2010; 6:00pm, FSN | | Auburn | W 85–75 | 18–7 (6–4) | The Hump (8,854); Starkville, MS |
| 2/16/2010; 8:00pm, ESPN | | No. 2 Kentucky | L 81–75 | 18–8 (6–5) | The Hump (10,788); Starkville, MS |
| 2/20/2010; 3:00pm, SEC Network | | at LSU | W 60–59 | 19–8 (7–5) | Pete Maravich Assembly Center (9,434); Baton Rouge, LA |
| 2/24/2010; 8:00pm, CSS | | Alabama | W 74–66 | 20–8 (8–5) | The Hump (8,477); Starkville, MS |
| 2/27/2010; 5:00pm, ESPN | | at South Carolina | W 76–63 | 21–8 (9–5) | Colonial Life Arena (13,834); Columbia, SC |
| 3/3/2010; 7:00pm, SEC Network | | at Auburn | L 89–80 | 21–9 (9–6) | Beard-Eaves-Memorial Coliseum (9,927); Auburn, AL |
| 3/6/2010; 5:00pm, ESPN | | No. 16 Tennessee | L 75–59 | 21–10 (9–7) | The Hump (10,021); Starkville, MS |
2010 SEC men's basketball tournament
| 3/12/2010; 6:30pm, SEC Network | | vs. Florida; Quarterfinals | W 75–69 | 22–10 | Bridgestone Arena (NA); Nashville, TN |
| 3/13/2010; 2:45pm, ABC | | vs. No. 20 Vanderbilt; Semifinals | W 62–52 | 23–10 | Bridgestone Arena (NA); Nashville, TN |
| 3/14/2010; 12:00pm, ABC | | vs. No. 2 Kentucky; Final | L 75–74 ^{OT} | 23–11 | Bridgestone Arena (20,082); Nashville, TN |
2010 National Invitation Tournament
| 3/16/2010*; 9:00pm, ESPNU | | Jackson State; First round | W 81–67 | 24–11 | The Hump (4,433); Starkville, MS |
| 3/22/2010*; 11:00am, ESPN | | North Carolina; Second round | L 76–74 | 24–12 | The Hump (9,471); Starkville, MS |
*Non-conference game. ^{#}Rankings from AP Poll. (#) Tournament seedings in parentheses.
