= 2010 SEC men's basketball tournament =

- Classification: Division I
- Season: 2009–10
- Teams: 12
- Site: Bridgestone Arena; Nashville, Tennessee
- Champions: Kentucky (27th title)
- Winning coach: John Calipari (1st title)
- MVP: John Wall (Kentucky)
- Attendance: 191,852
- Television: SEC Network (syndicated), ABC

2009–10 Southeastern Conference men's basketball standings
| | Conf. | | | | Overall |
| Team | W | | L | PCT | W | | L | PCT |
|---|---|---|---|---|---|---|---|---|
East
| No. 2 Kentucky† | 14 | – | 2 | .875 | 35 | – | 3 | .921 |
| No. 21 Vanderbilt | 12 | – | 4 | .750 | 24 | – | 9 | .727 |
| No. 15 Tennessee | 11 | – | 5 | .688 | 28 | – | 9 | .757 |
| Florida | 9 | – | 7 | .563 | 21 | – | 13 | .618 |
| South Carolina | 6 | – | 10 | .375 | 15 | – | 16 | .484 |
| Georgia | 5 | – | 11 | .313 | 14 | – | 17 | .452 |
West
| Mississippi State | 9 | – | 7 | .563 | 24 | – | 12 | .667 |
| Mississippi | 9 | – | 7 | .563 | 24 | – | 11 | .686 |
| Arkansas | 7 | – | 9 | .438 | 14 | – | 18 | .438 |
| Alabama | 6 | – | 10 | .375 | 17 | – | 15 | .531 |
| Auburn | 6 | – | 10 | .375 | 15 | – | 17 | .469 |
| LSU | 2 | – | 14 | .125 | 11 | – | 20 | .355 |
† 2010 SEC tournament winner As of March 30, 2010; Rankings from AP Poll

The 2010 SEC men's basketball tournament was held March 11–14, 2010 in Nashville, Tennessee at Bridgestone Arena. The first, quarterfinal, and semifinal rounds were televised by SEC Network and the semifinals and finals were broadcast nationwide on ABC, with the exception of the majority of South Carolina markets.

The weekend games did not air in the market of the South Carolina Gamecocks in Columbia. ABC affiliate WOLO pre-empted the game and aired the 2010 ACC men's basketball tournament semifinal and final matches instead, per syndication contract with Raycom Sports, with the current Raycom-WOLO contract continuing until the 2011 tournament. The games also did not air in the Greenville-Spartanburg area (also Asheville, NC), as ABC affiliate WLOS also aired the ACC tournament. Raycom had owned the syndication rights to SEC sports prior to this season.

== Seeds ==
All twelve SEC schools played in the tournament. Teams were seeded by 2009–10 SEC season record, with a tiebreaker system to seed teams with identical conference records. The top 2 teams in each division received a first round bye.

The seeds for the tournament were as follows:

| Seed | School | Conf (Overall) |
Eastern Division
| #1 | Kentucky | 14-2 (29-2) |
| #2 | Vanderbilt | 12-4 (23-7) |
| #3 | Tennessee | 11-5 (23-7) |
| #4 | Florida | 9-7 (20-11) |
| #5 | South Carolina | 6-10 (15-15) |
| #6 | Georgia | 5-11 (13-16) |
Western Division
| #1 | Mississippi State | 9-7 (21-10) |
| #2 | Ole Miss | 9-7 (21-9) |
| #3 | Arkansas | 7-9 (14-17) |
| #4 | Alabama | 6-10 (16-14) |
| #5 | Auburn | 6-10 (16-16) |
| #6 | LSU | 2-14 (11-19) |

== Schedule ==
| Session | Game | Time* | Matchup^{#} | Television | Attendance |
First Round - Thursday, March 11
| 1 | 1 | 1:00 PM | Alabama vs South Carolina | SEC Network | 15,152 |
| 1 | 2 | 3:15 PM | Tennessee vs LSU | SEC Network | 15,152 |
| 2 | 3 | 7:30 PM | Florida vs Auburn | SEC Network | 14,789 |
| 2 | 4 | 9:45 PM | Arkansas vs Georgia | SEC Network | 14,789 |
Quarterfinals - Friday, March 12
| 3 | 5 | 1:00 PM | Kentucky vs Alabama | SEC Network | 19,123 |
| 3 | 6 | 3:15 PM | Ole Miss vs Tennessee | SEC Network | 19,123 |
| 4 | 7 | 7:30 PM | Mississippi State vs Florida | SEC Network | 16,614 |
| 4 | 8 | 9:45 PM | Vanderbilt vs Georgia | SEC Network | 16,614 |
Semifinals - Saturday, March 13
| 5 | 9 | 1:00 PM | Kentucky vs Tennessee | ABC | 20,207 |
| 5 | 10 | 3:15 PM | Mississippi State vs Vanderbilt | ABC | 20,207 |
Championship Game - Sunday, March 14
| 6 | 11 | 1:00 PM | Kentucky vs Mississippi State | ABC | 20,082 |
*Game Times in ET. #-Rankings denote tournament seeding.

== Bracket ==
First round March 11; SEC Network
W4 | Alabama | 68
E5 | South Carolina | 63
E3 | #15 Tennessee | 59
W6 | LSU | 49
E4 | Florida | 78
W5 | Auburn | 69
W3 | Arkansas | 64
E6 | Georgia | 77

Second round March 12; SEC Network
E1 | #2 Kentucky | 73
W4 | Alabama | 67
W2 | Ole Miss | 65
E3 | #15 Tennessee | 76
W1 | Mississippi State | 75
E4 | Florida | 69
E2 | #20 Vanderbilt | 78
E6 | Georgia | 66

Semifinals; March 13; ABC
E1 | #2 Kentucky | 74
E3 | #15 Tennessee | 45
W1 | Mississippi State | 62
E2 | #20 Vanderbilt | 52

SEC Championship Game; March 14; ABC
E1 | #2 Kentucky | 75^{OT}
W1 | Mississippi State | 74
