= 2009–10 Ole Miss Rebels men's basketball team =

American college basketball season

2009–10 Ole Miss Rebels men's basketball

NIT, Semifinals
- Conference: Southeastern Conference
- West
- Record: 24–11 (9–7 SEC)
- Head coach: Andy Kennedy
- Assistant coaches: Mike White; Owen Miller; Torrey Ward
- Home arena: Tad Smith Coliseum

2009–10 Southeastern Conference men's basketball standings
	Conf.				Overall
Team	W		L	PCT	W		L	PCT
East
No. 2 Kentucky†	14	–	2	.875	35	–	3	.921
No. 21 Vanderbilt	12	–	4	.750	24	–	9	.727
No. 15 Tennessee	11	–	5	.688	28	–	9	.757
Florida	9	–	7	.563	21	–	13	.618
South Carolina	6	–	10	.375	15	–	16	.484
Georgia	5	–	11	.313	14	–	17	.452
West
Mississippi State	9	–	7	.563	24	–	12	.667
Mississippi	9	–	7	.563	24	–	11	.686
Arkansas	7	–	9	.438	14	–	18	.438
Alabama	6	–	10	.375	17	–	15	.531
Auburn	6	–	10	.375	15	–	17	.469
LSU	2	–	14	.125	11	–	20	.355
† 2010 SEC tournament winner As of March 30, 2010; Rankings from AP Poll

The 2009–10 Ole Miss Rebels men's basketball team represented the University of Mississippi in the 2009–10 college basketball season. This was head coach Andy Kennedy's fourth season at Ole Miss. The Rebels compete in the Southeastern Conference and played their home games at Tad Smith Coliseum. They finished 24–11, 9–7 in SEC play and lost in the quarterfinals of the 2010 SEC men's basketball tournament. They were invited to the 2010 National Invitation Tournament where they advanced to the semifinals before falling to Dayton.

== Roster ==
#	Name	Height	Weight (lbs.)	Position	Class	Hometown	Previous Team(s)
1	Terrance Henry	6'9"	202	F	So.	Monroe, LA, U.S.	Carroll HS
2	Reginald Buckner	6'8"	233	F	Fr.	Memphis, TN, U.S.	Manassas HS
3	Will Bogan	6'1"	172	G	So.	Caldwell, ID, U.S.	Vallivue HS
5	Michael Halford	6'3"	196	G	So.	Ridgeland, MS, U.S.	St. Andrew's Episcopal
12	Chris Warren	5'10"	168	G	Jr.	Orlando, FL, U.S.	Dr. Phillips HS
14	Eniel Polynice	6'5"	222	G	Jr.	Sarasota, FL, U.S.	Booker HS
20	Nick Williams	6'4"	225	G	So.	Mobile, AL, U.S.	LeFlore Prep Academy; Indiana
22	Logan Nutt	5'11"	180	G	Jr.	Jonesboro, AR, U.S.	Jonesboro HS; Missouri St.-West Plains
23	Trevor Gaskins	6'2"	210	G	So.	Alpharetta, GA, U.S.	Chattahoochee HS
24	Terrico White	6'5"	213	G	So.	Memphis, TN, U.S.	Craigmont HS
31	Murphy Holloway	6'7"	230	F	So.	Irmo, SC, U.S.	Dutch Fork HS
32	Zach Graham	6'6"	218	G	Jr.	Suwanee, GA, U.S.	Peachtree Ridge HS
44	DeAngelo Riley	6'9"	245	F	Jr.	Memphis, TN, U.S.	Kirby HS; Southwest Tennessee CC
52	DeAundre Cranston	6'9"	260	F	Sr.	Orlando, FL, U.S.	Evans HS; Daytona Beach CC

== Rankings ==
Ranking movement Legend: ██ Improvement in ranking. ██ Decrease in ranking. ██ Not ranked the previous week. RV=Others receiving votes.
Poll	Pre	Wk 1	Wk 2	Wk 3	Wk 4	Wk 5	Wk 6	Wk 7	Wk 8	Wk 9	Wk 10	Wk 11	Wk 12	Wk 13	Wk 14	Wk 15	Wk 16	WK 17	Wk 18	Final
AP	--	RV	RV	RV	25	20	15	16	14	21	22	18	25	RV	--	--	--	--	--	
Coaches	--	RV	RV	RV	RV	25	21	21	16	23	24	20	RV	RV	--	--	--	--	--	

== Schedule and results ==
- All times are Central

Date time, TV	Rank^{#}	Opponent^{#}	Result	Record	Site (attendance) city, state
Exhibition
11/6/2009; 6:00pm		Auburn Montgomery	W 102–62		Tad Smith Coliseum (NA); Oxford, MS
Regular Season
11/13/2009*; 6:00pm		Arkansas-Little Rock	W 92–64	1–0	Tad Smith Coliseum (5,870); Oxford, MS
11/16/2009*; 7:00pm		Alabama State	W 90–53	2–0	Tad Smith Coliseum (5,416); Oxford, MS
11/19/2009*; 4:00pm, ESPN2		vs. Indiana; Puerto Rico Tip-Off	W 89–71	3–0	José Miguel Agrelot Coliseum (NA); San Juan, PR
11/20/2009*; 7:30pm, ESPNU		vs. Kansas State; Puerto Rico Tip-Off	W 86–74	4–0	José Miguel Agrelot Coliseum (5,762); San Juan, PR
11/22/2009*; 7:00pm, ESPN2		vs. No. 5 Villanova; Puerto Rico Tip-Off	L 67–79	4–1	José Miguel Agrelot Coliseum (8,357); San Juan, PR
11/29/2009*; 3:00pm		Texas A&M-Corpus Christi	W 73–58	5–1	Tad Smith Coliseum (5,291); Oxford, MS
12/2/2009*; 7:00pm		at Arkansas State	W 79–57	6–1	Convocation Center (4,234); Jonesboro, AR
12/5/2009*; 12:00pm, FSN		Southern Mississippi	W 81–79	7–1	Tad Smith Coliseum (5,809); Oxford, MS
12/12/2009*; 1:00pm	No. 25	McNeese State	W 83–67	8–1	Tad Smith Coliseum (5,547); Oxford, MS
12/16/2009*; 7:00pm	No. 20	vs. UTEP	W 91–81 ^{OT}	9–1	DeSoto Civic Center (2,171); Southaven, MS
12/19/2009*; 1:00pm	No. 20	Centenary	W 108–64	10–1	Tad Smith Coliseum (5,673); Oxford, MS
12/23/2009*; 6:30pm, ESPN2	No. 15	at No. 6 West Virginia	L 66–76	10–2	WVU Coliseum (11,139); Morgantown, WV
12/29/2009*; 7:00pm	No. 16	Jacksonville State	W 90–75	11–2	Tad Smith Coliseum (4,531); Oxford, MS
1/5/2010*; 7:00pm	No. 14	Central Florida	W 84–56	12–2	Tad Smith Coliseum (5,538); Oxford, MS
1/9/2010; 12:30pm, SEC Network	No. 14	Mississippi State	L 75–80	12–3 (0–1)	Tad Smith Coliseum (9,360); Oxford, MS
1/13/2010; 7:00pm, SEC Network	No. 21	at Georgia	W 80–76	13–3 (1–1)	Stegeman Coliseum (6,743); Athens, GA
1/16/2010; 12:30pm, SEC Network	No. 21	at No. 9 Tennessee	L 69–71 ^{OT}	13–4 (1–2)	Thompson-Boling Arena (20,714); Knoxville, TN
1/20/2010; 8:00pm, CSS	No. 22	South Carolina	W 66–57	14–4 (2–2)	Tad Smith Coliseum (6,824); Oxford, MS
1/23/2010; 12:30pm, SEC Network	No. 22	at LSU	W 73–63	15–4 (3–2)	Pete Maravich Assembly Center (9,403); Baton Rouge, LA
1/28/2010; 8:00pm, ESPNU	No. 18	at Auburn	W 84–74	16–4 (4–2)	Beard-Eaves-Memorial Coliseum (6,984); Auburn, AL
1/31/2010; 6:00pm, SEC Network	No. 18	Arkansas	L 73–80	16–5 (4–3)	Tad Smith Coliseum (8,719); Oxford, MS
2/2/2010; 6:00pm, ESPN	No. 25	at No. 4 Kentucky	L 75–85	16–6 (4–4)	Rupp Arena (24,341); Lexington, KY
2/6/2010; 5:00pm, FSN	No. 25	Alabama	W 74–67	17–6 (5–4)	Tad Smith Coliseum (7,601); Oxford, MS
2/11/2010; 8:00pm, ESPN2		at Mississippi State	L 63–71	17–7 (5–5)	The Hump (9,401); Starkville, MS
2/18/2010; 6:00pm, ESPNU		No. 17 Vanderbilt	L 78–82	17–8 (5–6)	Tad Smith Coliseum (6,651); Oxford, MS
2/20/2010; 11:00am, CBS		Florida	L 61–64	17–9 (5–7)	Tad Smith Coliseum (7,071); Oxford, MS
2/24/2010; 7:00pm, SEC Network		Auburn	W 85–75	18–9 (6–7)	Tad Smith Coliseum (5,608); Oxford, MS
2/27/2010; 1:00pm, ESPN2		at Alabama	W 76–73	19–9 (7–7)	Coleman Coliseum (11,147); Tuscaloosa, AL
3/4/2010; 7:00pm, ESPN2		LSU	W 72–59	20–9 (8–7)	Tad Smith Coliseum (6,430); Oxford, MS
3/6/2010; 3:00pm, SEC Network		at Arkansas	W 68–66	21–9 (9–7)	Bud Walton Arena (13,927); Fayetteville
2010 SEC men's basketball tournament
3/12/2010; 2:39pm, Sec Network		No. 15 Tennessee; Quarterfinals	L 65–76	21–10	Bridgestone Arena (19,123); Nashville, TN
2010 National Invitation Tournament
3/17/2010; 7:00pm		Troy; First Round	W 84–65	22–10	Tad Smith Coliseum (3,107); Oxford, MS
3/19/2010; 5:30pm, ESPN2		Memphis; Second Round	W 90–81	23–10	Tad Smith Coliseum (8,218); Oxford, MS
3/23/2010; 6:00pm, ESPN		Texas Tech; Quarterfinals	W 90–87	24–10	Tad Smith Coliseum (6,014); Oxford, MS
3/30/2010; 6:00pm, ESPN2		vs. Dayton; Semifinals	L 63–68	24–11	Madison Square Garden (11,689); New York, NY
*Non-conference game. ^{#}Rankings from AP Poll. (#) Tournament seedings in parentheses.
