= 2009–10 Arkansas Razorbacks men's basketball team =

American college basketball season

2009–10 Arkansas Razorbacks men's basketball
- Conference: Southeastern Conference
- West
- Record: 14–18 (7–9 SEC)
- Head coach: John Pelphrey (3rd season)
- Assistant coaches: Rob Evans; Isaac Brown; Tom Ostrom
- Home arena: Bud Walton Arena

2009–10 Southeastern Conference men's basketball standings
	Conf.				Overall
Team	W		L	PCT	W		L	PCT
East
No. 2 Kentucky†	14	–	2	.875	35	–	3	.921
No. 21 Vanderbilt	12	–	4	.750	24	–	9	.727
No. 15 Tennessee	11	–	5	.688	28	–	9	.757
Florida	9	–	7	.563	21	–	13	.618
South Carolina	6	–	10	.375	15	–	16	.484
Georgia	5	–	11	.313	14	–	17	.452
West
Mississippi State	9	–	7	.563	24	–	12	.667
Mississippi	9	–	7	.563	24	–	11	.686
Arkansas	7	–	9	.438	14	–	18	.438
Alabama	6	–	10	.375	17	–	15	.531
Auburn	6	–	10	.375	15	–	17	.469
LSU	2	–	14	.125	11	–	20	.355
† 2010 SEC tournament winner As of March 30, 2010; Rankings from AP Poll

The 2009–10 Arkansas Razorbacks men's basketball team represented the University of Arkansas in the 2009–10 college basketball season. The head coach was John Pelphrey, serving in his third year. The team played its home games at Bud Walton Arena in Fayetteville, Arkansas and are members of the Southeastern Conference. They finished the season 14–18, 7–9 in SEC play and lost in the first round of the 2010 SEC men's basketball tournament.

== 2009–10 Roster ==
It was announced on July 5 that Jason Henry would not return to the hardwood for the Razorbacks this fall.

2009–10 Arkansas Razorbacks men's basketball roster
Source: arkansasrazorbacks.com – The Official Site of University of Arkansas Athletics
Number	Name	Position	Height	Weight	Class	Hometown (Previous school)
00	Michael Washington	F/C	6–9	239	Sr.	McGehee, AR (Genesis One Christian School)
2	Jemal Farmer	G/F	6–5	213	Jr.	Chicago, IL (Cloud County College)
3	Nick Mason	G	5–10	160	So.	Jonesboro, AR (Jonesboro HS)
4	Courtney Fortson	G	5–11	180	So.	Montgomery, AL (The Patterson Prep School)
5	Glenn Bryant	F	6–7	190	Fr.	Roseville, MI (Oak Hill Academy)
12	Marcus Britt	G	6–3	198	Jr.	Madison, AR (Forrest City High School)
14	Stefan Welsh	G	6–3	185	Sr.	Newport News, VA (Hargrave Military Academy)
15	Rotnei Clarke	G	6–0	184	So.	Verdigris, OK (Verdigris High School)
21	Delvon Johnson	F	6–9	220	Jr.	Richton, IL (Indian Hills Community College)
23	Julysses Nobles	G	6–1	170	Fr.	Jackson, MS (Callaway HS)
25	Stephen Cox	G	6–3	201	Sr.	Jonesboro, AR (Jonesboro HS)
30	Jeff Peterson	G	6–0	192	Jr.	Hyattsville, MD (University of Iowa)
31	Michael Sanchez	F	6–8	236	So.	Springdale, AR (Har-Ber HS)
33	Marshawn Powell	F	6–7	220	Fr.	Crozet, VA (The Miller School)

== 2009–10 schedule and results ==
Retrieved from arkansasrazorbacks.com

Date time, TV	Rank^{#}	Opponent^{#}	Result	Record	Site (attendance) city, state
Exhibition
11/2/09*; 7:00 pm		Dillard	W 77–59		Bud Walton Arena; Fayetteville, AR
11/5/09*; 7:00 pm		LeMoyne–Owen	W 102–69		Bud Walton Arena; Fayetteville, AR
Regular Season
11/13/09*; 7:00 pm		Alcorn State	W 130–68	1–0	Bud Walton Arena (12,067); Fayetteville, AR
11/17/09*; 6:30 pm, ESPN2		vs. Louisville; Hall of Fame Showcase	L 66–96	1–1	Scottrade Center (12,107); St. Louis, MO
11/20/09*; 7:00 pm		Appalachian State	W 81–72 ^{OT}	2–1	Bud Walton Arena (11,958); Fayetteville, AR
11/24/09*; 7:00 pm		Morgan State	L 94–97	2–2	Bud Walton Arena (13,599); Fayetteville, AR
11/27/08*; 7:00 pm, RSN		East Tennessee State	L 85–94	2–3	Bud Walton Arena (13,794); Fayetteville, AR
11/29/09*; 2:00 pm		South Alabama	L 61–74	2–4	Bud Walton Arena (13,405); Fayetteville, AR
12/2/09*; 7:00 pm, RSN		at Oklahoma	L 47–67	2–5	Lloyd Noble Center (10,612); Norman, OK
12/5/09*; 2:00 pm		Mississippi Valley State	W 91–54	3–5	Bud Walton Arena (13,474); Fayetteville, AR
12/7/09*; 7:00 pm		Delaware State	W 71–53	4–5	Bud Walton Arena (13,405); Fayetteville, AR
12/16/09*; 7:00 pm, RSN		Alabama State	W 76–51	5–5	Bud Walton Arena (13,507); Fayetteville, AR
12/19/09*; 3:00 pm, RSN		Stephen F. Austin	W 72–69	6–5	Bud Walton Arena (13,641); Fayetteville, AR
12/22/09*; 7:00 pm, RSN		Missouri State	W 66–62 ^{OT}	7–5	Bud Walton Arena (14,194); Fayetteville, AR
12/30/09*; 8:00 pm, ESPN2		Baylor	L 47–70	7–6	Verizon Arena (11,162); North Little Rock, AR
1/2/10*; 7:00 pm, RSN		No. 24 UAB	L 72–73	7–7	Bud Walton Arena (12,106); Fayetteville, AR
1/5/10*; 6:00 pm, ESPN2		No. 2 Texas	L 85–96	7–8	Bud Walton Arena (12,865); Fayetteville, AR
1/14/10; 6:00 pm, ESPNU		at Mississippi State	L 80–82	7–9 (0–1)	Humphrey Coliseum (8,339); Starkville, MS
1/16/10; 12:30 pm, SEC Network		Alabama	W 71–59	8–9 (1–1)	Bud Walton Arena (13,332); Fayetteville, AR
1/21/10; 8:00 pm, ESPN		Florida	L 66–71	8–10 (1–2)	Bud Walton Arena (13,673); Fayetteville, AR
1/23/10; 3:00 pm, SEC Network		at No. 2 Kentucky	L 70–101	8–11 (1–3)	Rupp Arena (24,356); Lexington, KY
1/28/10; 8:00 pm, ESPN2		Mississippi State	W 67–62	9–11 (2–3)	Bud Walton Arena (12,803); Fayetteville, AR
1/31/10; 6:00 pm, SEC Network		at No. 20 Ole Miss	W 80–73	10–11 (3–3)	Tad Smith Coliseum (8,719); Oxford, MS
2/3/10; 6:00 pm, CSS		at Georgia	W 72–68	11–11 (4–3)	Stegeman Coliseum (5,534); Athens, GA
2/6/10; 12:30 pm, SEC Network		Auburn	W 82–79 ^{OT}	12–11 (5–3)	Bud Walton Arena (13,811); Fayetteville, AR
2/10/10; 7:00 pm, SEC Network		LSU	W 87–52	13–11 (6–3)	Bud Walton Arena (12,777); Fayetteville, AR
2/13/10; 3:00 pm, SEC Network		at Alabama	L 68–73	13–12 (6–4)	Coleman Coliseum (13,151); Tuscaloosa, AL
2/17/10; 8:00 pm, CSS		South Carolina	W 92–79	14–12 (7–4)	Bud Walton Arena (13,175); Fayetteville, AR
2/20/10; 6:00 pm, FSN		at Auburn	L 83–92	14–13 (7–5)	Auburn, AL (8,312); Beard-Eaves-Memorial Coliseum
2/24/10; 7:00 pm, SEC Network		at LSU	L 54–65	14–14 (7–6)	Pete Maravich Assembly Center (8,463); Baton Rouge, LA
2/27/10; 12:30 pm, SEC Network		No. 16 Vanderbilt	L 72–89	14–15 (7–7)	Bud Walton Arena (14,146); Fayetteville, AR
3/3/10; 6:00 pm, CSS		at No. 16 Tennessee	L 73–80	14–16 (7–8)	Thompson-Boling Arena (20,139); Knoxville, TN
3/6/10; 3:00 pm, SEC Network		Ole Miss	L 66–68	14–17 (7–9)	Bud Walton Arena (13,927); Fayetteville, AR
SEC Tournament
3/11/10; 9:00 pm, SEC Network	(W3)	vs. (E6) Georgia; First Round	L 64–77	14–18	Bridgestone Arena (14,789); Nashville, TN
*Non-conference game. ^{#}Rankings from AP poll. (#) Tournament seedings in parentheses.

== Awards and honors ==
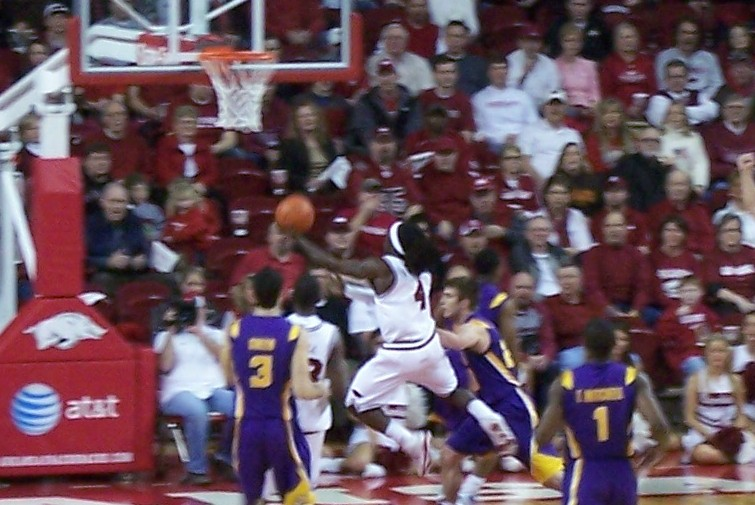
Fortson attempts a shot against LSU.

- Stephen Cox

SEC Winter Academic Honor Roll

- Rotnei Clarke

Number one shooter in the country – Foxsports.com
SEC Community Service team
United States Basketball Writer's Association's 2009–10 All-District VII team

- Courtney Fortson

SEC Player of the Week – Southeastern Conference
SEC All-Conference second team – SEC Coaches
All-SEC Honorable Mention – Associated Press

- Marshawn Powell

SEC Freshman of the Week – Southeastern Conference
SEC All-Freshman team – SEC Coaches
SEC All-Freshman team – TSN
Freshman All-American – Rivals.com
