= 2009–10 Alabama Crimson Tide men's basketball team =

American college basketball season

2009–10 Alabama Crimson Tide men's basketball
- Conference: Southeastern Conference
- Western Division
- Record: 17–15 (6–10 SEC)
- Head coach: Anthony Grant
- Assistant coaches: Dan Hipsher; John Brannen; Antoine Pettway
- Home arena: Coleman Coliseum (Capacity: 15,316)

2009–10 Southeastern Conference men's basketball standings
	Conf.				Overall
Team	W		L	PCT	W		L	PCT
East
No. 2 Kentucky†	14	–	2	.875	35	–	3	.921
No. 21 Vanderbilt	12	–	4	.750	24	–	9	.727
No. 15 Tennessee	11	–	5	.688	28	–	9	.757
Florida	9	–	7	.563	21	–	13	.618
South Carolina	6	–	10	.375	15	–	16	.484
Georgia	5	–	11	.313	14	–	17	.452
West
Mississippi State	9	–	7	.563	24	–	12	.667
Mississippi	9	–	7	.563	24	–	11	.686
Arkansas	7	–	9	.438	14	–	18	.438
Alabama	6	–	10	.375	17	–	15	.531
Auburn	6	–	10	.375	15	–	17	.469
LSU	2	–	14	.125	11	–	20	.355
† 2010 SEC tournament winner As of March 30, 2010; Rankings from AP Poll

The 2009–10 Alabama Crimson Tide men's basketball team (variously "Alabama", "UA", "Bama" or "The Tide") represented the University of Alabama in the 2009–10 college basketball season. The head coach was Anthony Grant, who was in his first year. The team played its home games at Coleman Coliseum in Tuscaloosa, Alabama and was a member of the Southeastern Conference. This was the 97th season of basketball in the school's history. The Crimson Tide finished the season 17–15, 6–10 in SEC play, lost in the quarterfinals of the 2010 SEC men's basketball tournament and were not invited to a post season tournament.

== Roster ==
#	Name	Position	Height	Weight	Year	Home Town	Last School
1	Anthony Brock	Guard	5–9	165	Senior	Little Rock, Ark.	Itawamba CC
2	Mikhail Torrance	Guard	6–5	210	Senior	Eight Mile, Ala.	Mary Montgomery HS
5	Tony Mitchell	Forward	6–6	185	Freshman	Swainsboro, Ga.	Central Park Christian HS
10	Ben Eblen	Guard	6–1	180	Freshman	Isle of Palms, S.C.	Florida Air Academy
20	Greg Cage	Guard	6–4	212	Senior	Indianapolis, Ind.	Bishop Chatard HS
21	Senario Hillman	Guard	6–1	192	Junior	Irwinton, Ga.	Wilkinson County HS
23	Demetrius Jemison	Forward	6–8	240	Senior	Birmingham, Ala.	Huffman HS
24	Charvez Davis	Guard	6–3	190	Junior	Montgomery, Ala.	Northwest Florida State College
25	Andrew Steele	Guard	6–3	215	Sophomore	Birmingham, Ala.	John Carroll HS
32	JaMychal Green	Forward	6–9	220	Sophomore	Montgomery, Ala.	St. Jude HS
40	Justin Knox	Forward	6–9	240	Junior	Tuscaloosa, Ala.	Central HS
44	Chris Hines	Forward	6–8	220	Junior	Evergreen, Ala.	Southwestern Illinois CC

== Schedule and results ==
Date time, TV	Rank^{#}	Opponent^{#}	Result	Record	Site (attendance) city, state
Exhibition
Nov. 4*; 7:30 p.m.		Montevallo	W 81–53		Coleman Coliseum; Tuscaloosa, AL
Nov. 10*; 7:00 p.m.		Augusta State	W 61–55		Coleman Coliseum; Tuscaloosa, AL
Regular season – non-conference play
Nov. 14*; 1:00 p.m.		Cornell	L 67–71	0–1	Coleman Coliseum (10,135); Tuscaloosa, AL
Nov. 17*; 7:30 p.m.		Jackson State	W 86–69	1–1	Coleman Coliseum (9,384); Tuscaloosa, AL
Nov. 20*; 7:00 p.m.		Providence	W 84–75	2–1	Coleman Coliseum (10,032); Tuscaloosa, AL
Nov. 26*; 5:30 p.m., ESPN2		vs. Baylor; Old Spice Classic	W 79–76	3–1	The Milk House (2,210); Lake Buena Vista, FL
Nov. 27*; 4:00 p.m., ESPN2		vs. Florida State; Old Spice Classic	L 51–60	3–2	The Milk House (1,915); Lake Buena Vista, FL
Nov. 29*; 4:00 p.m., ESPNU		vs. No. 15 Michigan; Old Spice Classic	W 68–66	4–2	The Milk House (2,225); Lake Buena Vista, FL
Dec. 2*; 7:00 p.m.		North Florida	W 73–51	5–2	Coleman Coliseum (9,244); Tuscaloosa, AL
Dec. 5*; 12:00 p.m.		Louisiana–Monroe	W 74–46	6–2	Coleman Coliseum (8,502); Tuscaloosa, AL
Dec. 12*; 8:00 p.m., ESPN2		No. 5 Purdue	L 65–73	6–3	Coleman Coliseum (12,477); Tuscaloosa, AL
Dec. 16*; 7:00 p.m.		Samford	W 60–45	7–3	Coleman Coliseum (9,565); Tuscaloosa, AL
Dec. 19*; 7:30 p.m., CSS		No. 17 Kansas State; Coors Classic	L 74–87	7–4	Mitchell Center (5,192); Mobile, AL
Dec. 23*; 7:00 p.m.		Mercer	W 90–71	8–4	Coleman Coliseum (9,705); Tuscaloosa, AL
Dec. 30*; 7:30 p.m.		Tennessee State	W 77–65	9–4	Coleman Coliseum (9,799); Tuscaloosa, AL
Jan. 4*; 6:00 p.m.		at Toledo	W 67–50	10–4	Savage Arena (4,023); Toledo, OH
Regular season – conference play
Jan. 9; 4:00 p.m., FSN		at LSU	W 66–49	11–4 (1–0)	Pete Maravich Assembly Center (9,666); Baton Rouge, LA
Jan. 13; 8:00 p.m., CSS		Vanderbilt	L 64–65	11–5 (1–1)	Coleman Coliseum (11,608); Tuscaloosa, AL
Jan. 16; 12:30 p.m., SEC Network		at Arkansas	L 59–71	11–6 (1–2)	Bud Walton Arena (13,332); Fayetteville, AR
Jan. 19; 6:00 p.m., ESPN		No. 8 Tennessee	L 56–63	11–7 (1–3)	Coleman Coliseum (12,098); Tuscaloosa, AL
Jan. 23; 11:00 a.m., CBS		No. 23 Mississippi State	W 62–57	12–7 (2–3)	Coleman Coliseum (12,336); Tuscaloosa, AL
Jan. 27; 7:00 p.m., SEC Network		LSU	W 57–38	13–7 (3–3)	Coleman Coliseum (10,657); Tuscaloosa, AL
Jan. 30; 3:00 p.m., SEC Network		at Auburn	L 57–58	13–8 (3–4)	Beard-Eaves-Memorial Coliseum (10,775); Auburn, AL
Feb. 4; 6:00 p.m., ESPNU		Florida	L 65–66	13–9 (3–5)	Coleman Coliseum (10,845); Tuscaloosa, AL
Feb. 6; 5:00 p.m., FSN		at No. 25 Mississippi	L 67–74	13–10 (3–6)	Tad Smith Coliseum (7,601); Oxford, MS
Feb. 9; 8:00 p.m., ESPNU		at No. 3 Kentucky	L 55–66	13–11 (3–7)	Rupp Arena (23,318); Lexington, KY
Feb. 13; 3:00 p.m., SEC Network		Arkansas	W 73–68	14–11 (4–7)	Coleman Coliseum (13,151); Tuscaloosa, AL
Feb. 20; 3:00 p.m., SEC Network		at Georgia	L 70–76	14–12 (4–8)	Stegeman Coliseum (8,510); Athens, GA
Feb. 24; 8:00 p.m., CSS		at Mississippi State	L 66–74	14–13 (4–9)	Humphrey Coliseum (8,477); Starkville, MS
Feb. 27; 1:00 p.m., ESPN2		Mississippi	L 73–76	14–14 (4–10)	Coleman Coliseum (11,147); Tuscaloosa, AL
Mar. 3; 6:00 p.m., ESPNU		at South Carolina	W 79–70	15–14 (5–10)	Colonial Life Arena (11,109); Columbia, SC
Mar. 6; 12:30 p.m., SEC Network		Auburn	W 73–61	16–14 (6–10)	Coleman Coliseum (15,383); Tuscaloosa, AL
2010 SEC men's basketball tournament
Mar. 11; 12:00 p.m., SEC Network	(W4)	vs. (E5) South Carolina; First Round	W 68–63	17–14	Bridgestone Arena (15,152); Nashville, TN
Mar. 12; 12:00 p.m., SEC Network	(W4)	vs. (E1) No. 2 Kentucky; Quarterfinals	L 67–73	17–15	Bridgestone Arena (19,123); Nashville, TN
*Non-conference game. ^{#}Rankings from AP Poll. (#) Tournament seedings in parentheses. All times are in Central Time.

== See also ==
- 2010 NCAA Men's Division I Basketball Tournament
- 2009–10 NCAA Division I men's basketball season
- 2009–10 NCAA Division I men's basketball rankings
