= 2009–10 Vanderbilt Commodores men's basketball team =

American college basketball season

2009–10 Vanderbilt Commodores men's basketball

NCAA tournament, Round of 64
- Conference: Southeastern Conference

Ranking
- AP: No. 21
- Record: 24–9 (12–4 SEC)
- Head coach: Kevin Stallings
- Assistant coaches: Dan Muller; Tom Richardson; King Rice
- Home arena: Memorial Gymnasium

2009–10 Southeastern Conference men's basketball standings
| | Conf. | | | | Overall |
| Team | W | | L | PCT | W | | L | PCT |
|---|---|---|---|---|---|---|---|---|
East
| No. 2 Kentucky† | 14 | – | 2 | .875 | 35 | – | 3 | .921 |
| No. 21 Vanderbilt | 12 | – | 4 | .750 | 24 | – | 9 | .727 |
| No. 15 Tennessee | 11 | – | 5 | .688 | 28 | – | 9 | .757 |
| Florida | 9 | – | 7 | .563 | 21 | – | 13 | .618 |
| South Carolina | 6 | – | 10 | .375 | 15 | – | 16 | .484 |
| Georgia | 5 | – | 11 | .313 | 14 | – | 17 | .452 |
West
| Mississippi State | 9 | – | 7 | .563 | 24 | – | 12 | .667 |
| Mississippi | 9 | – | 7 | .563 | 24 | – | 11 | .686 |
| Arkansas | 7 | – | 9 | .438 | 14 | – | 18 | .438 |
| Alabama | 6 | – | 10 | .375 | 17 | – | 15 | .531 |
| Auburn | 6 | – | 10 | .375 | 15 | – | 17 | .469 |
| LSU | 2 | – | 14 | .125 | 11 | – | 20 | .355 |
† 2010 SEC tournament winner As of March 30, 2010; Rankings from AP Poll

The 2009–10 Vanderbilt Commodores men's basketball team represented Vanderbilt University in the 2009–10 NCAA Division I men's college basketball season. The team competed in the East Division of the Southeastern Conference, as it has since the SEC expanded to 12 schools in 1991. The team was led by Kevin Stallings, in his tenth year as head coach, and played their home games at their home since 1952, Memorial Gymnasium on the school's campus in Nashville, Tennessee. They finished the season 24–9, 12–4 in SEC play. They lost in the semifinals of the 2010 SEC men's basketball tournament to Mississippi State. The Commodores received an at-large bid to the 2010 NCAA Division I men's basketball tournament, earning a 4 seed in the west region, where they lost to 13 seed Murray State in the first round on a last second buzzer beater.

== Roster and individual statistics ==
| # | Name | Pos. | Height | Weight | Year | Hometown |
|---|---|---|---|---|---|---|
| 0 | Jermaine Beal | G | 6–3 | 205 | SR | DeSoto, TX |
| 1 | Brad Tinsley | G | 6–3 | 210 | SO | Oregon City, OR |
| 3 | Festus Ezeli | C | 6–11 | 255 | SO | Benin City, Nigeria |
| 4 | Andrew (A.J.) Ogilvy | C | 6–11 | 250 | JR | Sydney, Australia |
| 5 | Lance Goulbourne | G/F | 6–7 | 215 | SO | Brooklyn, NY |
| 12 | Jordan Smart^{1} | G/F | 6–6 | 180 | FR | Lexington, KY |
| 15 | Elliott Cole^{1} | G | 5–11 | 180 | JR | Memphis, TN |
| 21 | Darshawn McClellan | F | 6–7 | 240 | JR | Fresno, CA |
| 23 | John Jenkins | G | 6–4 | 215 | FR | Hendersonville, TN |
| 24 | Andre Walker | F | 6–7 | 214 | SO | Flossmoor, IL |
| 33 | Steve Tchiengang | F | 6–9 | 240 | SO | Douala, Cameroon |
| 44 | Jeffery Taylor | G/F | 6–7 | 210 | SO | Norrköping, Sweden |
| 50 | Joe Duffy^{1} | F | 6–8 | 225 | JR | Charlotte, NC |

^{1} Walk-on.

Source: ESPN.com

== 2009-10 schedule and results ==
| Date time, TV | Rank^{#} | Opponent^{#} | Result | Record | Site (attendance) city, state |
Regular season
| 11/16/09*; 7:00pm | | Lipscomb | W 95–73 | 1–0 | Memorial Gymnasium (13,481); Nashville, TN |
| 11/20/09*; 10:30pm | | at Saint Mary's | W 72–70 | 2–0 | McKeon Pavilion (3,500); Moraga, CA |
| 11/23/09*; 4:30pm, ESPN2 | No. 24 | vs. Cincinnati; Maui Invitational | L 58–67 | 2–1 | Lahaina Civic Center (2,400); Lahaina, HI |
| 11/24/09*; 12:30pm, ESPN2 | No. 24 | vs. Chaminade; Maui Invitational | W 68–41 | 3–1 | Lahaina Civic Center (2,400); Lahaina, HI |
| 11/25/09*; 6:00pm, ESPNU | No. 24 | vs. Arizona; Maui Invitational | W 84–72 | 4–1 | Lahaina Civic Center (2,400); Lahaina, HI |
| 12/2/09*; 8:30pm, ESPNU | | Missouri | W 89–83 | 5–1 | Memorial Gymnasium (14,256); Nashville, TN |
| 12/5/09*; 3:00pm | | DePaul | W 67–54 | 6–1 | Memorial Gymnasium (14,016); Nashville, TN |
| 12/8/09*; 7:30pm, BTN | | at Illinois | L 68–75 | 6–2 | Assembly Hall (15,594); Champaign, IL |
| 12/11/09*; 8:30pm | | vs. Western Kentucky; Sun Belt Classic | L 69–76 | 6–3 | Sommet Center (14,516); Nashville, TN |
| 12/19/09*; 3:00pm | | Tennessee State | W 84–71 | 7–3 | Memorial Gymnasium (12,429); Nashville, TN |
| 12/21/09*; 7:00pm | | Mercer | W 99–59 | 8–3 | Memorial Gymnasium (12,347); Nashville, TN |
| 12/30/09*; 7:00pm | | Manhattan | W 86–48 | 9–3 | Memorial Gymnasium (12,338); Nashville, TN |
| 1/2/10*; 2:00pm, FSN | | Southern Miss | W 82–46 | 10–3 | Memorial Gymnasium (13,176); Nashville, TN |
| 1/4/10*; 8:00pm, FSN | | Middle Tennessee | W 73–53 | 11–3 | Memorial Gymnasium (12,383); Nashville, TN |
| 1/9/10; 11:00a, ESPN2 | | Florida | W 95–87 | 12–3 (1–0) | Memorial Gymnasium (13,327); Nashville, TN |
| 1/13/10; 8:00pm, CSS | | at Alabama | W 65–64 | 13–3 (2–0) | Coleman Coliseum (11,608); Tuscaloosa, AL |
| 1/16/10; 5:00pm, CSS | | at South Carolina | W 89–79 | 14–3 (3–0) | Colonial Life Arena (13,166); Columbia, SC |
| 1/23/10; 12:30pm, SEC | | Auburn | W 82–74 | 15–3 (4–0) | Memorial Gymnasium (14,316); Nashville, TN |
| 1/27/10; 6:00pm, ESPNU | No. 21 | at No. 14 Tennessee | W 85–76 | 16–3 (5–0) | Thompson-Boling Arena (19,103); Knoxville, TN |
| 1/30/10; 3:00p, ESPN | No. 21 | at No. 1 Kentucky | L 72–85 | 16–4 (5–1) | Rupp Arena (24,339); Lexington, KY |
| 2/3/10; 7:00pm, SEC | No. 18 | Mississippi State | W 75–72 | 17–4 (6–1) | Memorial Gymnasium (14,316); Nashville, TN |
| 2/6/10; 7:00pm, FSN | No. 18 | at Georgia | L 58–72 | 17–5 (6–2) | Stegeman Coliseum (8,131); Athens, GA |
| 2/9/10; 6:00pm, ESPN | No. 22 | No. 12 Tennessee | W 90–71 | 18–5 (7–2) | Memorial Gymnasium (14,316); Nashville, TN |
| 2/13/10; 12:30pm, SEC | No. 22 | LSU | W 77–69 | 19–5 (8–2) | Memorial Gymnasium (14,316); Nashville, TN |
| 2/18/10; 6:00pm, ESPNU | No. 17 | at Mississippi | W 82–78 | 20–5 (9–2) | Tad Smith Coliseum (6,651); Oxford, MS |
| 2/20/10; 5:00pm, ESPN | No. 17 | No. 2 Kentucky | L 56–58 | 20–6 (9–3) | Memorial Gymnasium (14,316); Nashville, TN |
| 2/25/10; 6:00pm, ESPNU | No. 16 | Georgia | W 96–94 ^{OT} | 21–6 (10–3) | Memorial Gymnasium (14,316); Nashville, TN |
| 2/27/10; 12:30pm, SEC | No. 16 | at Arkansas | W 89–72 | 22–6 (11–3) | Bud Walton Arena (14,146); Fayetteville, AR |
| 3/2/10; 6:00pm, ESPN | No. 13 | at Florida | W 64–60 | 23–6 (12–3) | O'Connell Center (11,607); Gainesville, FL |
| 3/6/10; 1:00pm, ESPN2 | No. 13 | South Carolina | L 73–77 | 23–7 (12–4) | Memorial Gymnasium (14,316); Nashville, TN |
2010 SEC tournament
| 3/12/10; 9:05pm, SEC | No. 20 | vs. Georgia; Quarterfinals | W 78–66 | 24–7 | Bridgestone Arena (16,614); Nashville, TN |
| 3/13/10; 2:15pm, ABC | No. 20 | vs. Mississippi State; Semifinals | L 52–62 | 24–8 | Bridgestone Arena (20,207); Nashville, TN |
2010 NCAA tournament
| 3/18/10; 1:30pm, CBS | No. 21 | vs. Murray State; First Round | L 65–66 | 24–9 | HP Pavilion (12,712); San Jose, CA |
*Non-conference game. ^{#}Rankings from AP Poll. (#) Tournament seedings in parentheses. All times are in Central Time Zone.
