= Devan Downey =

American basketball player (born 1987)

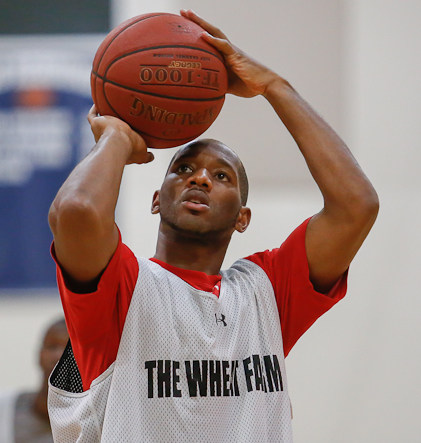

Personal information
- Born: September 28, 1987 (age 38) Chester, South Carolina, U.S.
- Listed height: 5 ft 9 in (1.75 m)
- Listed weight: 170 lb (77 kg)

Career information
- High school: Chester (Chester, South Carolina)
- College: Cincinnati (2005–2006); South Carolina (2007–2010)
- NBA draft: 2010: undrafted
- Playing career: 2010–2017
- Position: Point guard

Career history
- 2010–2011: Antalya BB
- 2011: Zadar
- 2011: Chorale Roanne
- 2011: Verviers-Pepinster
- 2012: Fort Wayne Mad Ants
- 2012: TED Ankara Kolejliler
- 2012–2013: Sigal Prishtina
- 2013: Timișoara
- 2013–2014: Al Jaysh
- 2013–2014: Al Gharafa
- 2017: Guaiqueríes de Margarita
- 2017: Leones de Santo Domingo

Career highlights
- 2× AP Honorable mention All-American (2009, 2010); 2× First-team All-SEC (2009, 2010); SEC All-Defensive Team (2010); South Carolina Mr. Basketball (2005)

Devan Deangelo Downey (born September 28, 1987) is an American professional basketball player.

== Amateur career ==
He was born in Chester, South Carolina where he attended Chester High School. Named S.C. Class AAA Player of the Year and Mr. Basketball as a senior at Chester High Devan Downey Averaged 36.9 points, 6.1 assists, 4.3 rebounds and 4.7 steals his senior year under coach De'Andre Scott.

He played collegiately for the University of Cincinnati and then the University of South Carolina, where he was an honorable mention All-American and 1st team All-SEC player in 2008–09. Downey went undrafted in the 2010 NBA draft.

Perhaps the most notable game of his career occurred on January 26, 2010, when he scored 30 points in a victory over a previously undefeated University of Kentucky team which aired nationally on ESPN. The game was the first loss for John Wall, DeMarcus Cousins, and John Calipari while at the University of Kentucky. The game and particularly the performance by Downey is revisited by hosts Gary Parrish and Matt Norlander of CBS Sports three times a week on their podcast, Eye on College Basketball.

== Professional career ==
In July 2010 he signed with Antalya BSB in Turkey. In January 2011 he signed with KK Zadar in Croatia, but because of the financial problems of the club left the team in March 2011 and then signed with Chorale Roanne in France. In March 2013, he signed with BC Timișoara in Romania. He later went on to play for the Dominican Republic and eventually snagged a two-year contract with Venezuela. In 2019 the pandemic impacted sports all over the world. Devan has been unsigned since 2019 and is currently unemployed.

== See also ==
- List of NCAA Division I men's basketball career steals leaders
