= Ted Barrett =

American baseball umpire (born 1965)

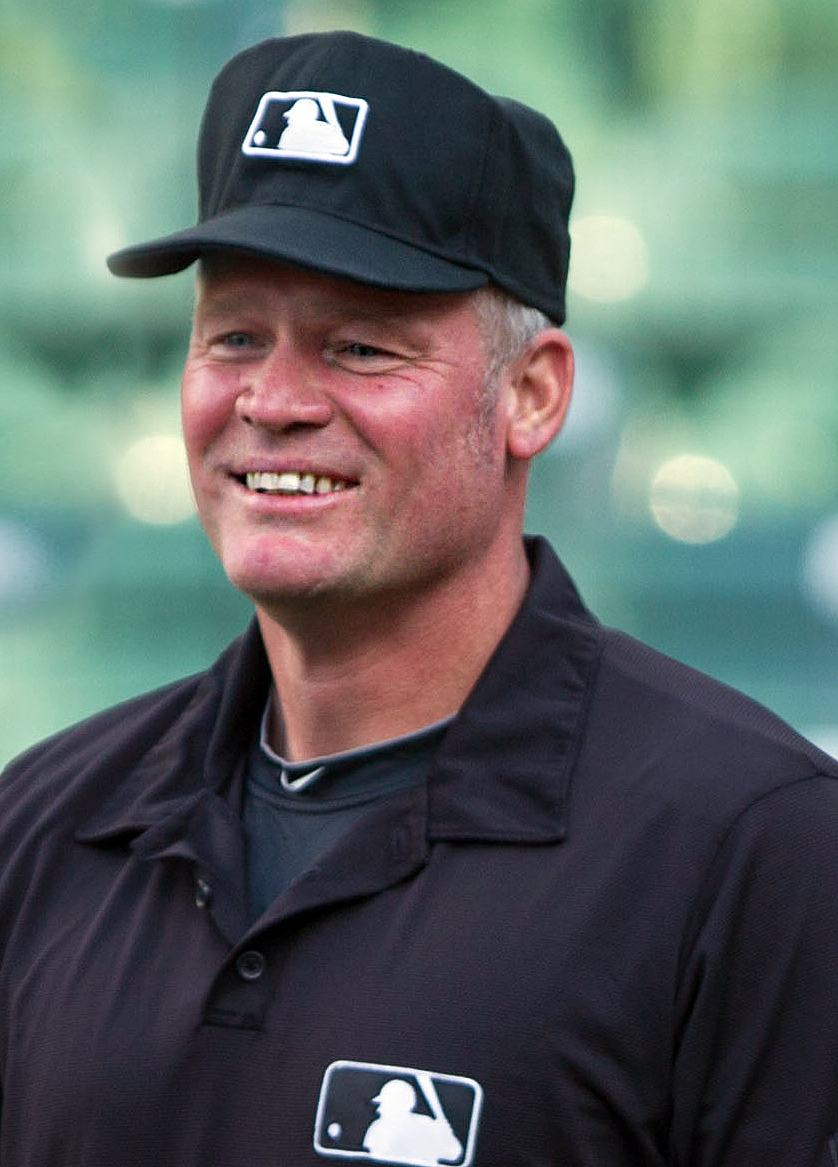
- Barrett in 2012
- Umpire
- Born: July 31, 1965 (age 60); Pasco, Washington, U.S.

MLB debut
- May 27, 1994

Last MLB appearance
- October 23, 2022

Career highlights and awards
- Special assignments: World Series (2007, 2011, 2014, 2018, 2021); League Championship Series (2005, 2008, 2009, 2010, 2012, 2013, 2015, 2016, 2020, 2022); Division Series (2000, 2001, 2002, 2003, 2006, 2007, 2011, 2014, 2017, 2018, 2019, 2021); Wild Card Games/Series (2012, 2013, 2015, 2016, 2020, 2022); All-Star Games (2007, 2018); World Baseball Classic (2009, 2013, 2017); Home plate umpire for David Cone's perfect game (July 18, 1999); Home plate umpire for Matt Cain's perfect game (June 13, 2012)

Edward George Barrett (born July 31, 1965) is an American former Major League Baseball umpire. He joined the American League's staff in 1994, and worked throughout both major leagues from 2000 until his retirement in 2022. Promoted to crew chief in 2013, Barrett worked in 33 play-off series (tied for most all-time), including five World Series. He retired following the 2022 season.

== Early life ==
Barrett grew up in North Tonawanda, New York, and Mountain View, California. He played high school basketball for Vance Walberg, inventor of the dribble drive offense. In college, he was captain of the football team. He earned a degree in kinesiology at Cal State-Hayward in 1988. Prior to pursuing umpiring, Barrett was an amateur boxer.

== Umpiring career ==
His professional umpiring career began after he attended the Joe Brinkman Umpire School in 1989, and he worked his way up to the Pacific Coast League for the 1993 season. He made his major league debut in 1994. For the next five seasons, Barrett served as a fill-in umpire for vacationing or injured major league umpires. Barrett was one of the 25 umpires promoted in the wake of the Major League Umpires Association's mass-resignation strategy in July 1999. His five years of experience made him one of the most experienced of the 25 umpires called up to fill the sudden vacancies.

Barrett wore uniform number 12 (previously worn by Terry Cooney) while on the American League staff, then changed to 65 when the American and National League umpiring staffs merged in 2000.

He has worked twelve Division Series (2000, 2001, 2002, 2003, 2006, 2007, 2011, 2014, 2017, 2018, 2019, 2021); ten Championship Series (2005, 2008, 2009, 2010, 2012, 2013, 2015, 2016, 2020, 2022); and five World Series (2007, 2011, 2014, 2018, 2021).

He was promoted to the position of crew chief prior to the 2013 season.

=== Notable games ===
He was the home plate umpire for David Cone's perfect game for the New York Yankees against the Montreal Expos on July 18, 1999, the first interleague no-hitter in the regular season.

Barrett was behind the plate on August 7, 2004, for Greg Maddux's 300th win.

Barrett was the second base umpire for the final Montreal Expos home game on September 29, 2004. The Florida Marlins defeated the Expos 9–1.

During a game between the Atlanta Braves and the San Francisco Giants on August 14, 2007, Barrett ejected Atlanta manager Bobby Cox for arguing balls and strikes. The ejection was the 132nd of Cox's managerial career, breaking the major league record previously held by John McGraw.

Barrett was behind home plate at Progressive Field when Los Angeles Angels pitcher Ervin Santana threw a no-hitter against the Cleveland Indians on July 27, 2011.

He was at third base on April 21, 2012, for Philip Humber's perfect game.

Barrett was at first base for a combined no-hitter thrown by six Seattle Mariners pitchers against the Los Angeles Dodgers on June 8, 2012.

He became the only umpire in major league history to be behind the plate for two perfect games on June 13, 2012, when Matt Cain pitched a perfect game for the San Francisco Giants against the Houston Astros. Additionally, Barrett is the only umpire in Major League history to have been on the field for three perfect games.

Barrett was chosen as one of the umpires for the one-game Wild Card playoff between the Baltimore Orioles and the Texas Rangers on October 5, 2012. He also worked the 2013, 2015 and 2016 AL wild card playoff games.

Barrett was the home plate umpire for game 6 of the 2016 National League Championship Series in which the Chicago Cubs won their first National League pennant since 1945.

Barrett was selected as Crew Chief for the 2018 World Series. He was behind the plate for Game 3 which at 7 hours and 20 minutes was the longest game in World Series history.

On April 4, 2022, in a preseason game between the Los Angeles Angels and the Los Angeles Dodgers at Dodger Stadium, Barrett became the first umpire in Major League history to announce the results of a Manager’s Challenge by microphone.

== Personal life ==
Barrett is also heavily involved with Christian ministry, and has earned a master's degree in Biblical Studies from Trinity College and Seminary. In 2013, he earned a doctorate in theology, with an emphasis in Pastoral Ministry, from Trinity; his dissertation was "An Investigation of Faith As a Life Principle in the Lives of Major League Umpires". In 2023, Ted Barrett was hired by MLB Network to be a rules analyst.

== See also ==
- List of Major League Baseball umpires (disambiguation)
