= Calipari (surname) =

Calipari is a surname. Notable people with the name include:

- Erin Calipari (born 1987), American professor and college basketball player, daughter of John Calipari
- John Calipari (born 1959), American basketball coach
- Nicola Calipari (1953–2005), Italian major general
