= 2009–10 Kentucky Wildcats men's basketball team =

2009–10 season of University of Kentucky men's basketball team

2009–10 Kentucky Wildcats men's basketball

SEC regular season and tournament champions

NCAA tournament, Elite Eight
- Conference: Southeastern Conference
- Eastern

Ranking
- Coaches: No. 5
- AP: No. 2
- Record: 35–3 (14–2 SEC)
- Head coach: John Calipari (1st season)
- Assistant coaches: Orlando Antigua (1st season); John Robic (1st season); Rod Strickland (1st season)
- Home arena: Rupp Arena

2009–10 Southeastern Conference men's basketball standings
	Conf.				Overall
Team	W		L	PCT	W		L	PCT
East
No. 2 Kentucky†	14	–	2	.875	35	–	3	.921
No. 21 Vanderbilt	12	–	4	.750	24	–	9	.727
No. 15 Tennessee	11	–	5	.688	28	–	9	.757
Florida	9	–	7	.563	21	–	13	.618
South Carolina	6	–	10	.375	15	–	16	.484
Georgia	5	–	11	.313	14	–	17	.452
West
Mississippi State	9	–	7	.563	24	–	12	.667
Mississippi	9	–	7	.563	24	–	11	.686
Arkansas	7	–	9	.438	14	–	18	.438
Alabama	6	–	10	.375	17	–	15	.531
Auburn	6	–	10	.375	15	–	17	.469
LSU	2	–	14	.125	11	–	20	.355
† 2010 SEC tournament winner As of March 30, 2010; Rankings from AP Poll

The 2009–10 Kentucky Wildcats men's basketball team represented the University of Kentucky during the college basketball season of 2009–10. This season was the first of John Calipari's tenure as head coach; he accepted the position on March 31, 2009.

The Wildcats set several records this season. They became the first men's college basketball program to reach 2,000 wins by defeating the Drexel Dragons on December 21. Coach Calipari set a record for the most consecutive wins for a first-year Kentucky basketball coach at 19–0, surpassing Adolph Rupp's previous mark of 11–0. Kentucky also extended their existing records for most wins all-time, SEC regular-season championships, SEC tournament championships, NCAA tournament berths, and NCAA tournament wins.

The team was briefly ranked #1 in both the ESPN/Coaches poll and AP poll, and posted the best record in the NCAA (35–3) Off the court, Coach Calipari spearheaded an effort to raise money for victims of the 2010 Haiti earthquake, yielding $1.5 million and a congratulatory call from President Barack Obama.

== Departures ==
2009-10 Kentucky departures

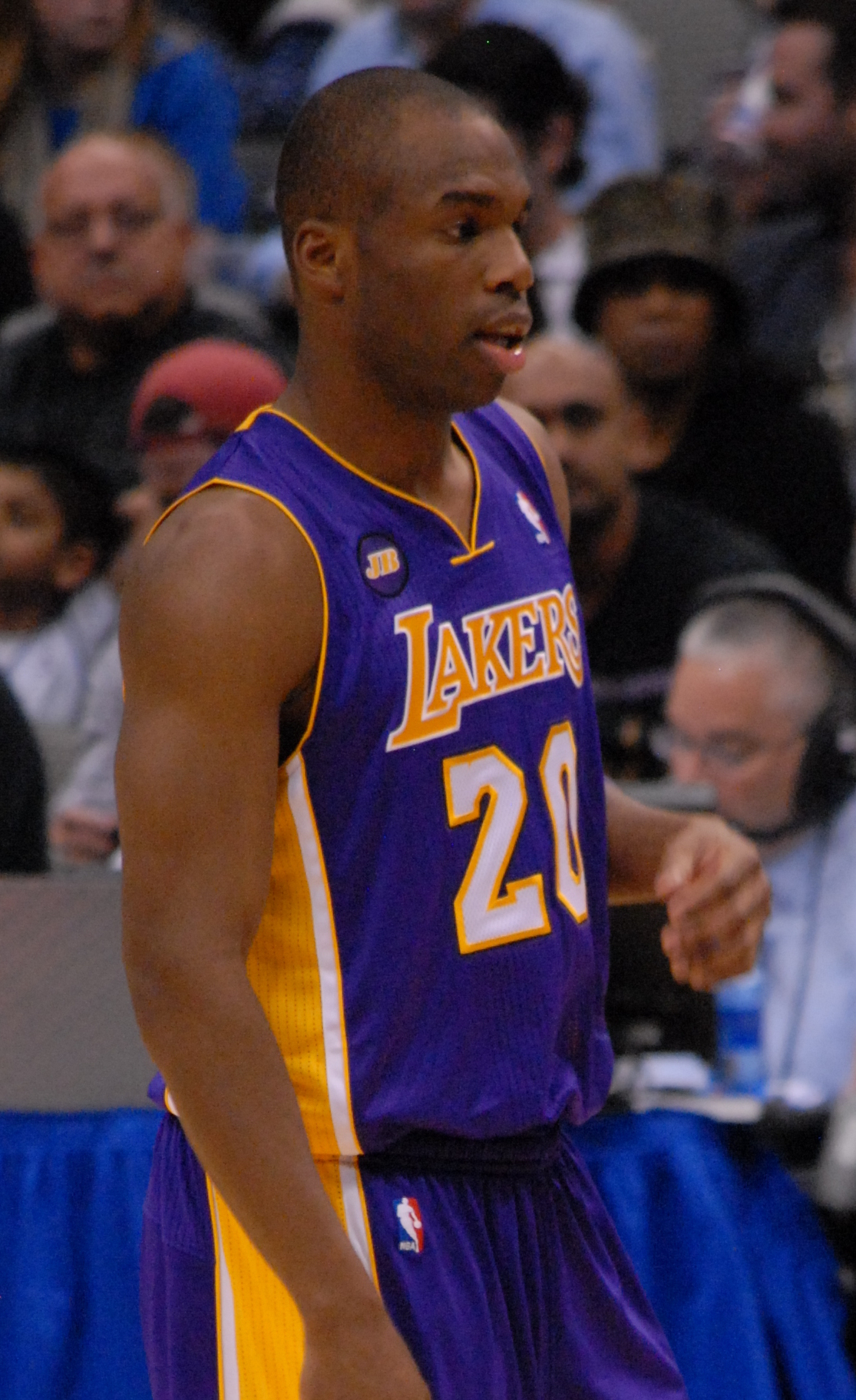
Jodie Meeks entered the NBA draft

Name	Number	Pos.	Height	Weight	Year	Hometown	Notes
Jared Carter	43	Center	7'2"	277	Senior	Georgetown, Kentucky	Graduated
Matt Scherbenske	2	Guard	6'0"	180	Junior	Lexington, Kentucky	Left team
Kevin Galloway	3	Guard	6'6"	215	Junior	Sacramento, California	Transferred
Michael Porter	13	Guard	6'3"	198	Junior	Modesto, California	Left Team
Jodie Meeks	23	Guard	6'4"	208	Junior	Norcross, Georgia	Entered 2009 NBA draft
Dwight Perry	30	Guard	6'0"	185	Junior	Durham, North Carolina	Left team
Matt Pilgrim	33	Forward	6'8"	225	Junior	Cincinnati	Transferred
A.J. Stewart	15	Forward	6'7"	225	Sophomore	Jacksonville, Florida	Transferred
Donald Williams	25	Guard	6'3"	205	Freshman	Baton Rouge, Louisiana	Transferred

== Class of 2009 signees ==
College recruiting
Name	Hometown	School	Height	Weight	Commit date
Eric Bledsoe; G	Birmingham, Alabama	Parker	6 ft 1 in (1.85 m)	180 lb (82 kg)	May 6, 2009
Eric Bledsoe; G	Recruit ratings: Scout: Rivals: (90)				
DeMarcus Cousins; F	Mobile, Alabama	LeFlore	6 ft 9 in (2.06 m)	250 lb (110 kg)	Apr 8, 2009
DeMarcus Cousins; F	Recruit ratings: Scout: Rivals: (98)				
Darnell Dodson; G/F	Greenbelt, Maryland	Miami-Dade CC	6 ft 5 in (1.96 m)	185 lb (84 kg)	Apr 22, 2009
Darnell Dodson; G/F	Recruit ratings: Scout: Rivals: (89)				
Jon Hood; SG	Madisonville, Kentucky	Madisonville-North Hopkins	6 ft 6 in (1.98 m)	195 lb (88 kg)	May 25, 2008
Jon Hood; SG	Recruit ratings: Scout: Rivals: (92)				
Daniel Orton; C	Oklahoma City, Oklahoma	Bishop McGuinness	6 ft 10 in (2.08 m)	265 lb (120 kg)	Oct 12, 2008
Daniel Orton; C	Recruit ratings: Scout: Rivals: (97)				
John Wall; PG	Raleigh, North Carolina	Word of God	6 ft 4 in (1.93 m)	184 lb (83 kg)	May 18, 2009
John Wall; PG	Recruit ratings: Scout: Rivals: (98)				
Overall recruit ranking: Scout: 1 Rivals: 1 ESPN: 1
Note: In many cases, Scout, Rivals, 247Sports, On3, and ESPN may conflict in their listings of height and weight.; In these cases, the average was taken. ESPN grades are on a 100-point scale.; Sources: "Kentucky 2009 Basketball Commitments". Rivals.; "2009 Kentucky Basketball Commits". Scout.; "ESPN". ESPN.; "Scout.com Team Recruiting Rankings". Scout.; "2009 Team Ranking". Rivals.

== Class of 2010 signees ==
College recruiting
Name	Hometown	School	Height	Weight	Commit date
Terrence Jones; SF	Portland, Oregon	Jefferson High School	6 ft 9 in (2.06 m)	220 lb (100 kg)	May 19, 2010
Terrence Jones; SF	Recruit ratings: Scout: Rivals: (97)				
Enes Kanter; C	Tarzana, California	Stoneridge Prep	6 ft 11 in (2.11 m)	261 lb (118 kg)	Mar 23, 2010
Enes Kanter; C	Recruit ratings: Scout: Rivals: (95)				
Brandon Knight; PG	Fort Lauderdale, Florida	Pine Crest School	6 ft 3 in (1.91 m)	195 lb (88 kg)	Apr 14, 2010
Brandon Knight; PG	Recruit ratings: Scout: Rivals: (97)				
Doron Lamb; G	Brooklyn, New York	Oak Hill Academy	6 ft 4 in (1.93 m)	190 lb (86 kg)	Apr 18, 2010
Doron Lamb; G	Recruit ratings: Scout: Rivals: (95)				
Stacey Poole; G	Jacksonville, Florida	Providence School	6 ft 4 in (1.93 m)	190 lb (86 kg)	Sep 24, 2009
Stacey Poole; G	Recruit ratings: Scout: Rivals: (85)				
Eloy Vargas; PF	Hollywood, Florida	Miami Dade College	6 ft 11 in (2.11 m)	225 lb (102 kg)	May 16, 2010
Eloy Vargas; PF	Recruit ratings: Scout: Rivals: (95)				
Overall recruit ranking:
Note: In many cases, Scout, Rivals, 247Sports, On3, and ESPN may conflict in their listings of height and weight.; In these cases, the average was taken. ESPN grades are on a 100-point scale.; Sources: "Kentucky 2010 Basketball Commitments". Rivals.; "2010 Kentucky Basketball Commits". Scout.; "ESPN". ESPN.; "Scout.com Team Recruiting Rankings". Scout.; "2010 Team Ranking". Rivals.

== Roster ==
2009–10 Kentucky Wildcats men's basketball team
Players
Coaches

Pos.	#	Name	Height	Weight	Year	Previous school	Hometown
F	1	Darius Miller	6 ft 7 in (2.01 m)	223 lb (101 kg)	So	Mason County H.S.	Maysville, Kentucky
F	3	Darnell Dodson	6 ft 7 in (2.01 m)	215 lb (98 kg)	So	Miami Dade College	Greenbelt, Maryland
G	4	Jon Hood	6 ft 6 in (1.98 m)	195 lb (88 kg)	Fr	North Hopkins H.S.	Madisonville, Kentucky
F	5	Ramon Harris	6 ft 7 in (2.01 m)	218 lb (99 kg)	Sr	West Anchorage High School	Anchorage, AK
G	11	John Wall	6 ft 4 in (1.93 m)	195 lb (88 kg)	Fr	Word of God Christian Academy	Raleigh, North Carolina
G	12	Mark Krebs	6 ft 5 in (1.96 m)	207 lb (94 kg)	Sr	Newport Central Catholic/Thomas More College	Newport, Kentucky
C	15	DeMarcus Cousins	6 ft 11 in (2.11 m)	270 lb (122 kg)	Fr	LeFlore Magnet High School	Mobile, AL
F	21	Perry Stevenson	6 ft 9 in (2.06 m)	207 lb (94 kg)	Sr	Lafayette H.S.	Lafayette, Louisiana
G	24	Eric Bledsoe	6 ft 1 in (1.85 m)	190 lb (86 kg)	Fr	A. H. Parker High School	Birmingham, AL
C	33	Daniel Orton	6 ft 10 in (2.08 m)	255 lb (116 kg)	Fr	Bishop McGuinness H.S.	Oklahoma City, Oklahoma
G	34	DeAndre Liggins	6 ft 6 in (1.98 m)	202 lb (92 kg)	So	Findley Prep (NV)	Chicago
F	54	Patrick Patterson	6 ft 9 in (2.06 m)	235 lb (107 kg)	Jr	Huntington High School	Huntington, West Virginia
F	55	Josh Harrellson	6 ft 10 in (2.08 m)	265 lb (120 kg)	Jr	Southwestern Illinois Junior College	St. Charles, Missouri

Head coach

- John Calipari (Clarion)

Assistant coach(es)

- John Robic (Denison)
- Orlando Antigua (Pittsburgh)
- Rod Strickland (DePaul)

Legend

- (C) Team captain
- (S) Suspended
- (I) Ineligible
- (W) Walk-on
- Injured
- Current redshirt

=== Depth chart ===
Pos.	Starting 5	Bench 1	Bench 2
C	DeMarcus Cousins	Daniel Orton	Josh Harrellson
PF	Patrick Patterson	Perry Stevenson
SF	Darius Miller	Ramon Harris	Jon Hood
SG	Eric Bledsoe	Darnell Dodson
PG	John Wall	DeAndre Liggins	Mark Krebs

== Schedule ==
Date time, TV	Rank^{#}	Opponent^{#}	Result	Record	High points	High rebounds	High assists	Site (attendance) city, state
Exhibition
November 2*; 7:00 pm, BBSN	No. 4	Campbellsville	W 74–38	—	19 – Dodson	7 – Orton	4 – Bledsoe	Rupp Arena (21,384); Lexington, Kentucky
November 6*; 7:00 pm, BBSN	No. 4	Clarion	W 117–52	—	27 – Wall	9 – Dodson	9 – Wall	Rupp Arena (23,740); Lexington, Kentucky
Non-conference Regular Season
November 13*; 6:30 pm, ESPNU	No. 4	Morehead State	W 75–59	1–0	24 – Bledsoe	12 – Patterson	4 – Bledsoe	Rupp Arena (24,338); Lexington, Kentucky
November 16*; 7:00 pm, BBSN	No. 4	Miami (OH)	W 72–70	2–0	19 – Wall	10 – Tied	5 – Wall	Rupp Arena (23,337); Lexington, Kentucky
November 19*; 7:00 pm, BBSN	No. 4	Sam Houston State; Cancún Challenge	W 102–92	3–0	27 – Cousins	18 – Cousins	6 – Tied	Rupp Arena (22,728); Lexington, Kentucky
November 21*; 1:00 pm, BBSN	No. 4	Rider; Cancún Challenge	W 92–63	4–0	21 – Wall	18 – Patterson	11 – Wall	Rupp Arena (23,912); Lexington, Kentucky
November 24*; 4:30 pm, CBS Sports	No. 5	vs. Cleveland State; Cancún Challenge Semifinals	W 73–49	5–0	15 – Wall	8 – Miller	6 – Wall	Moon Palace Resort (832); Cancún, Mexico
November 25*; 9:30 pm, CBS Sports	No. 5	vs. Stanford; Cancún Challenge Championship	W 73–65 ^{OT}	6–0	23 – Wall	11 – Patterson	5 – Wall	Moon Palace Resort (1,425); Cancún, Mexico
November 30*; 7:00 pm, BBSN	No. 5	UNC Asheville	W 94–57	7–0	24 – Cousins	10 – Cousins	14 – Wall	Freedom Hall (15,368); Louisville, Kentucky
December 5*; 12:30 pm, CBS	No. 5	No. 10 North Carolina	W 68–66	8–0	19 – Patterson	7 – Patterson	7 – Wall	Rupp Arena (24,468); Lexington, Kentucky
December 9*; 9:30 pm, ESPN	No. 4	vs. No. 14 Connecticut; 2009 Big East/SEC Invitational	W 64–61	9–0	25 – Wall	10 – Cousins	4 – Bledsoe	Madison Square Garden (24,468); New York City
December 12*; 12:00 pm, CBS	No. 4	at Indiana	W 90–73	10–0	23 – Bledsoe	11 – Patterson	8 – Wall	Assembly Hall (17,316); Bloomington, Indiana
December 19*; 4:00 pm, CSS	No. 3	Austin Peay	W 90–69	11–0	21 – Patterson	9 – Patterson	6 – Wall	Rupp Arena (23,938); Lexington, Kentucky
December 21*; 7:00 pm, ESPNU	No. 3	Drexel; 2000th Win	W 88–44	12–0	18 – Tied	13 – Cousins	7 – Wall	Rupp Arena (24,354); Lexington, Kentucky
December 23*; 1:00 pm, BBSN	No. 3	Long Beach State	W 86–73	13–0	19 – Wall	11 – Patterson	5 – Tied	Rupp Arena (24,288); Lexington, Kentucky
December 29*; 7:00 pm, ESPN2	No. 3	Hartford	W 104–61	14–0	19 – Tied	12 – Cousins	16 – Wall	Rupp Arena (24,340); Lexington, Kentucky
January 2*; 3:30 pm, CBS	No. 3	Louisville; Battle for the Bluegrass	W 71–62	15–0	18 – Cousins	18 – Cousins	4 – Tied	Rupp Arena (24,479); Lexington, Kentucky
SEC Regular Season
January 9; 4:00 pm, SEC Network	No. 3	Georgia	W 76–68	16–0 (1–0)	17 – Tied	7 – Cousins	5 – Wall	Rupp Arena (24,342); Lexington, Kentucky
January 12; 9:00 pm, ESPN	No. 2	at Florida; Super Tuesday	W 89–77	17–0 (2–0)	25 – Bledsoe	7 – Tied	6 – Wall	O'Connell Center (12,618); Gainesville, Florida
January 16; 4:00 pm, SEC Network	No. 2	at Auburn	W 72–67	18–0 (3–0)	16 – Cousins	11 – Cousins	4 – Wall	Beard-Eaves-Memorial Coliseum (11,669); Auburn, AL
January 23; 4:00 pm, SEC Network	No. 2	Arkansas	W 101–70	19–0 (4–0)	18 – Miller	14 – Cousins	7 – Wall	Rupp Arena (24,356); Lexington, Kentucky
January 26; 9:00 pm, ESPN	No. 1	at South Carolina; Super Tuesday	L 62–68	19–1 (4–1)	27 – Cousins	12 – Cousins	5 – Bledsoe	Colonial Life Arena (18,000); Columbia, South Carolina
January 30; 4:00 pm, ESPN	No. 1	No. 21 Vanderbilt	W 85–72	20–1 (5–1)	21 – Cousins	10 – Cousins	9 – Wall	Rupp Arena (24,339); Lexington, Kentucky
February 2; 7:00 pm, ESPN	No. 4	No. 25 Ole Miss; Super Tuesday	W 85–75	21–1 (6–1)	18 – Cousins	13 – Cousins	8 – Bledsoe	Rupp Arena (24,341); Lexington, Kentucky
February 6; 4:00 pm, SEC Network	No. 4	at LSU	W 81–55	22–1 (7–1)	19 – Cousins	14 – Cousins	7 – Wall	Maravich Center (13,083); Baton Rouge, Louisiana
February 9; 9:00 pm, ESPNU	No. 3	Alabama	W 66–55	23–1 (8–1)	22 – Wall	13 – Cousins	4 – Bledsoe	Rupp Arena (23,318); Lexington, Kentucky
February 13; 9:00 pm, ESPN	No. 3	No. 12 Tennessee; ESPN College Gameday	W 73–62	24–1 (9–1)	24 – Wall	12 – Cousins	4 – Tied	Rupp Arena (24,402); Lexington, Kentucky
February 16; 9:00 pm, ESPN	No. 2	at Mississippi State; Super Tuesday	W 81–75 ^{OT}	25–1 (10–1)	19 – Tied	14 – Cousins	8 – Wall	Humphrey Coliseum (10,788); Starkville, Mississippi
February 20; 6:00 pm, ESPN	No. 2	at No. 17 Vanderbilt	W 58–56	26–1 (11–1)	19 – Cousins	13 – Patterson	3 – Bledsoe	Memorial Gymnasium (14,316); Nashville, Tennessee
February 25; 9:00 pm, ESPN2	No. 2	South Carolina	W 82–61	27–1 (12–1)	23 – Patterson	11 – Cousins	4 – Wall	Rupp Arena (24,355); Lexington, Kentucky
February 27; 12:00 pm, CBS	No. 2	at No. 19 Tennessee	L 65–74	27–2 (12–2)	19 – Wall	14 – Cousins	6 – Wall	Thompson–Boling Arena (21,214); Knoxville, Tennessee
March 3; 8:00 pm, SEC Network	No. 3	at Georgia	W 80–68	28–2 (13–2)	24 – Wall	10 – Patterson	6 – Wall	Stegeman Coliseum (10,523); Athens, Georgia
March 7; 12:00 pm, CBS	No. 3	Florida; Senior Day	W 74–66	29–2 (14–2)	14 – Tied	9 – Cousins	8 – Wall	Rupp Arena (24,354); Lexington, Kentucky
SEC Tournament
March 12; 1:00 pm, SEC Network	(1 E) No. 2	vs. (4 W) Alabama; Quarterfinal	W 73–67	30–2	23 – Wall	8 – Cousins	5 – Wall	Bridgestone Arena (19,123); Nashville, Tennessee
March 13; 1:00 pm, ABC	(1 E) No. 2	vs. (3 E) No. 15 Tennessee; Semifinal	W 74–45	31–2	19 – Cousins	15 – Cousins	9 – Wall	Bridgestone Arena (20,207); Nashville, Tennessee
March 14; 1:00 pm, ABC	(1 E) No. 2	vs. (1 W) Mississippi State; Championship Game	W 75–74 ^{OT}	32–2	18 – Bledsoe	10 – Cousins	9 – Wall	Bridgestone Arena (20,082); Nashville, Tennessee
NCAA tournament
March 18; 7:15 pm, CBS	(1 E) No. 2	vs. (16 E) East Tennessee State; First Round	W 100–71	33–2	29 – Bledsoe	8 – Cousins	11 – Wall	New Orleans Arena (10,984); New Orleans
March 20; 8:15 pm, CBS	(1 E) No. 2	vs. (9 E) Wake Forest; Second Round	W 90–60	34–2	20 – Miller	9 – Miller	7 – Wall	New Orleans Arena (11,966); New Orleans, Louisiana
March 25; 9:57 pm, CBS	(1 E) No. 2	vs. (12 E) Cornell; Sweet Sixteen	W 62–45	35–2	16 – Cousins	12 – Patterson	8 – Wall	Carrier Dome (22,271); Syracuse, New York
March 27; 7:05 pm, CBS	(1 E) No. 2	vs. (2 E) No. 6 West Virginia; Elite Eight	L 66–73	35–3	19 – Wall	13 – Patterson	5 – Wall	Carrier Dome (22,497); Syracuse, New York
*Non-conference game. ^{#}Rankings from AP Poll. (#) Tournament seedings in parentheses. E=NCAA East Regional. All times are in Eastern Time.

== Statistics ==
The team posted the following statistics:

Name	GP	GS	Min.	Avg.	FG	FGA	FG%	3FG	3FGA	3FG%	FT	FTA	FT%	OR	DR	RB	Avg.	PF	DQ	Ast.	TO	Blk.	Stl.	Pts.	Avg.
John Wall	37	37	1,288	34.8	202	438	0.461	37	114	0.325	175	232	0.754	30	129	159	4.3	72	1	241	149	19	66	616	16.6
DeMarcus Cousins	38	37	893	23.5	206	369	0.558	1	6	0.167	162	268	0.604	156	220	376	9.9	122	2	38	78	67	37	575	15.1
Patrick Patterson	38	38	1,255	33.0	215	374	0.575	24	69	0.348	90	130	0.692	116	167	283	7.4	61	1	36	41	51	27	544	14.3
Eric Bledsoe	37	35	1,122	30.3	144	312	0.462	49	128	0.383	82	123	0.667	19	95	114	3.1	82	1	107	112	12	52	419	11.3
Darius Miller	38	32	804	21.2	86	215	0.400	43	128	0.336	31	39	0.795	31	62	93	2.4	72	2	58	35	22	22	246	6.5
Darnell Dodson	35	7	506	14.5	70	192	0.365	50	144	0.347	19	25	0.760	16	72	88	2.5	40	0	17	23	9	15	209	6.0
DeAndre Liggins	29	0	445	15.3	36	86	0.419	14	44	0.318	23	39	0.590	18	48	66	2.3	42	1	24	17	8	20	109	3.8
Daniel Orton	38	0	502	13.2	48	91	0.527	0	2	0.000	33	63	0.524	45	81	126	3.3	88	5	15	38	52	21	129	3.4
Ramon Harris	36	2	395	11.0	21	62	0.339	5	31	0.161	20	33	0.606	30	45	75	2.1	27	0	23	26	5	11	67	1.9
Perry Stevenson	34	1	259	7.6	18	27	0.667	0	1	0.000	8	13	0.615	13	35	48	1.4	19	0	7	12	20	4	44	1.3
Josh Harrellson	22	0	88	4.0	12	26	0.462	2	4	0.500	2	2	1.000	9	18	27	1.2	8	0	0	6	7	2	28	1.2
Jon Hood	17	0	74	4.4	6	19	0.316	4	11	0.364	4	4	1.000	7	5	12	0.7	6	0	6	4	0	1	20	1.2
Mark Krebs	16	1	44	2.8	2	17	0.118	2	15	0.133	0	0	0.000	0	2	2	0.1	2	0	1	1	1	1	6	0.4
TEAM	38													58	57	115	3.0	0			5			0	
Season Total	38	—	7,675	—	1,066	2,228	0.478	231	697	0.331	649	971	0.668	548	1,036	1,584	41.7	641	13	573	547	273	279	3,012	79.3
Opponents	38	—	7,675	—	875	2,314	0.378	245	783	0.313	473	688	0.688	488	789	1,277	33.6	795	—	418	531	119	261	2,468	64.9

== Honors ==
=== SEC Awards ===
Wall was named SEC Player of the Year. Cousins, Patterson, and Wall were chosen to the first-team All-SEC by coaches and the media. Cousins was the SEC Freshman of the Year, and he, Bledsoe, and Wall were All-Freshman team selections by the coaches and media. Calipari was named SEC Coach of the Year by the coaches media.

=== National District Awards ===
Wall was named District IV (Kentucky, Tennessee, Mississippi, Alabama, Georgia and Florida) Player of the Year, Calipari was named District IV Coach of the Year and Patterson was named to the All-District IV team by the USBWA. Cousins and Wall were listed on the National Association of Basketball Coaches Division I All-District 21 first team, while Patterson was listed on the second team on March 12.

=== All-American and National Awards ===
Wall was a consensus first-team All-American, and Cousins was a consensus second-team All-American. The Associated Press named Cousins and Wall as first-team All-Americans. The USBWA named Wall a first-team All-American and Cousins a second-team All-American. The NABC named Wall a first-team All-American and Cousins a second-team All-American. The Sporting News named Wall a first-team All-American and Cousins a second-team All-American. John Wall became the first Kentucky player to win a National Player of the Year award as he won the Adolph Rupp Trophy. Wall also won the two Freshman of the Year awards as he was named USBWA National Freshman of the Year and Freshman of the Year by the Sporting News.

== Rankings ==
Ranking movements Legend: ██ Increase in ranking ██ Decrease in ranking ( ) = First-place votes
	Week																			
Poll	Pre	1	2	3	4	5	6	7	8	9	10	11	12	13	14	15	16	17	18	Final
AP	4 (3)	4 (1)	5	5	4	3	3 (1)	3 (1)	3 (1)	2 (9)	2 (8)	1 (65)	4 (1)	3 (2)	2 (3)	2 (4)	3	2 (2)	2	Not released
Coaches	5	5	5	4	4	3 (1)	3	3	3	2 (1)	2 (1)	1 (31)	3 (1)	2 (1)	2 (1)	2 (1)	3	2	2	5

== 2010 NBA draft ==
On April 7 five players announced their intentions to enter the 2010 NBA draft. Five players declared themselves eligible for the draft: Bledsoe, Cousins, Orton, Patterson, and Wall. Leading up to the draft Wall, Cousins, and Patterson were projected as lottery picks. Meanwhile, Bledsoe and Orton were projected as possible first-round draft picks.

In the draft Wall was selected No. 1 by Washington. He was followed by Cousins, who went to the Sacramento Kings at No. 5; Patterson, who was taken by the Houston Rockets at No. 14; Bledsoe, who was chosen No. 18 by the Oklahoma City Thunder; and Orton, who was chosen No. 29 by the Orlando Magic. Wall became the first player in Kentucky history taken first in the draft. The five players taken in the first round tied the record for most players taken from one school in the first round.

=== NBA draft selections ===
Year	Round	Pick	Overall	Player	NBA Club
2010	1	1	1	John Wall	Washington Wizards
2010	1	5	5	DeMarcus Cousins	Sacramento Kings
2010	1	14	14	Patrick Patterson	Houston Rockets
2010	1	18	18	Eric Bledsoe	Oklahoma City Thunder
2010	1	29	29	Daniel Orton	Orlando Magic
