= Attack Attack =

Attack Attack may refer to:

- Attack Attack! (American band), an American band (with one exclamation mark)
  - Attack Attack! (album), the American band's second studio album released in 2010
- Attack! Attack! (Welsh band), a Welsh band (with two exclamation marks)
  - Attack! Attack!, 2008 debut album of Attack! Attack! (Welsh band), released in USA as Attack! Attack! UK
- "Attack Attack", song by Yellow Bird, a project of Peter Shelley and Marty Wilde 1974

== See also ==
- Attack attack skip attack attack, a basketball maneuver
