= St. Charles High School (Missouri) =

High school in St. Charles, Missouri, U.S.

Location
- 725 North Kingshighway; St. Charles, Missouri 63301; United States; 38.7907°N 90.4888°W

Information
- Type: Public high school
- Motto: Latin: Faber est quisque suae fortunae (Each one is the architect of their own future)
- Established: 1899; 127 years ago
- School district: City of St. Charles School District
- Superintendent: Jason Sefrit
- Principal: Ted Happel
- Teaching staff: 70.55 (on an FTE basis)
- Grades: 9–12
- Enrollment: 785 (2023–24)
- Student to teacher ratio: 11.13
- Colors: Navy and white
- Fight song: Notre Dame Victory March
- Nickname: Fighting Pirates
- Rival: St. Charles West High School
- Website: scpirates.org

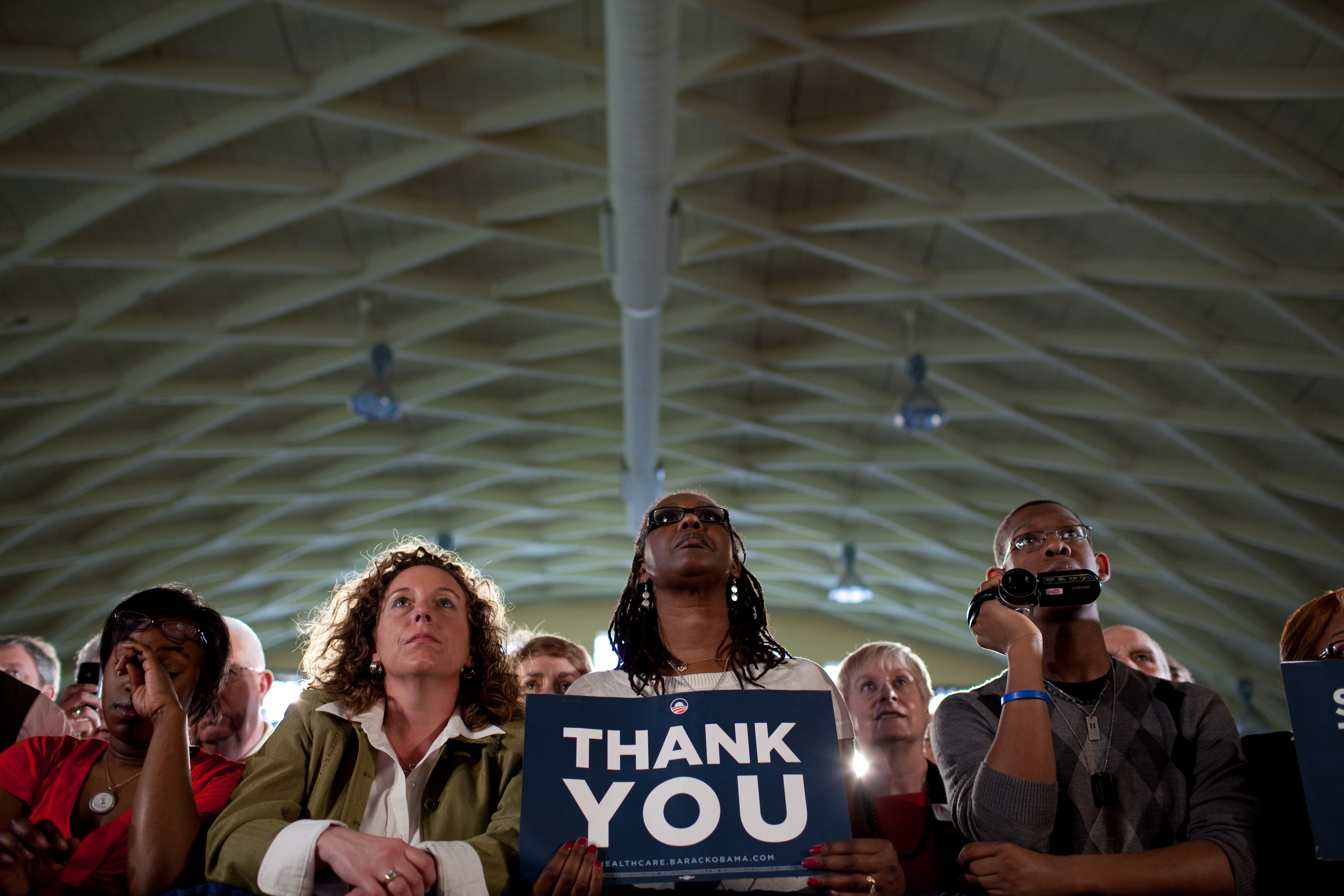
An official White House photo shows a member of the audience holding a "Thank You" sign during President Barack Obama's speech on Medicare fraud and health care insurance reform in the auxiliary gym on March 10, 2010.

St. Charles High School is a 9–12 public high school in St. Charles, Missouri, United States. The other high school in St. Charles, MO is St. Charles West High School.

== History ==
St. Charles High School began as a two-year high school in 1899, expanding to a four-year program in 1902. Originally located at Fourth and Jefferson Streets, it is situated at the former home of the St. Charles Military Academy, to which it moved after a fire in 1918. The campus began with one building in 1923 and had expanded to four by the 1965–66 school year. Within a decade, overcrowding led to the division of the district into two high schools. The school became racially integrated in 1955.

=== Visit by President Obama ===
On March 10, 2010, President Barack Obama made a visit to St. Charles and gave a speech at St. Charles High school, in the older gym on the campus. His speech dealt primarily with the proposed health care reform legislation, and while access to the speech was by invitation only, hundreds of supporters and opponents of the president were outside to witness the historic event.

== Academics ==
The student-teacher ratio is 15, slightly higher than the state average of 14.

== Sports ==
Interscholastic sports include:

- Baseball
- Basketball
- Cross-Country
- Football
- Golf
- Marching Band
- Soccer
- Softball
- Swimming
- Tennis
- Track
- Wrestling

== Notable alumni ==
- Greg Amsinger (1997) — host of MLB Network and MLB Tonight
- Curtis Brown — NFL running back Buffalo Bills 1977–1982 and the Houston Oilers 1983
- Tom Ehlmann, television executive
- Josh Harrellson (2007) — former NBA player for the Miami Heat, and currently plays for a Japanese League.
- Connie Price-Smith (1981) — Olympic shot putter and discus thrower; 2016 US Olympic track and field coach
- Santino Rice (1993) — fashion designer and television personality; contestant on Season Two of Project Runway
- Austin Ruse (1974) - political activist, author
- Dennis Tankersley (1997) — former MLB pitcher, San Diego Padres, 2002–2004
