= Josh Harrellson =

American basketball player (born 1989)

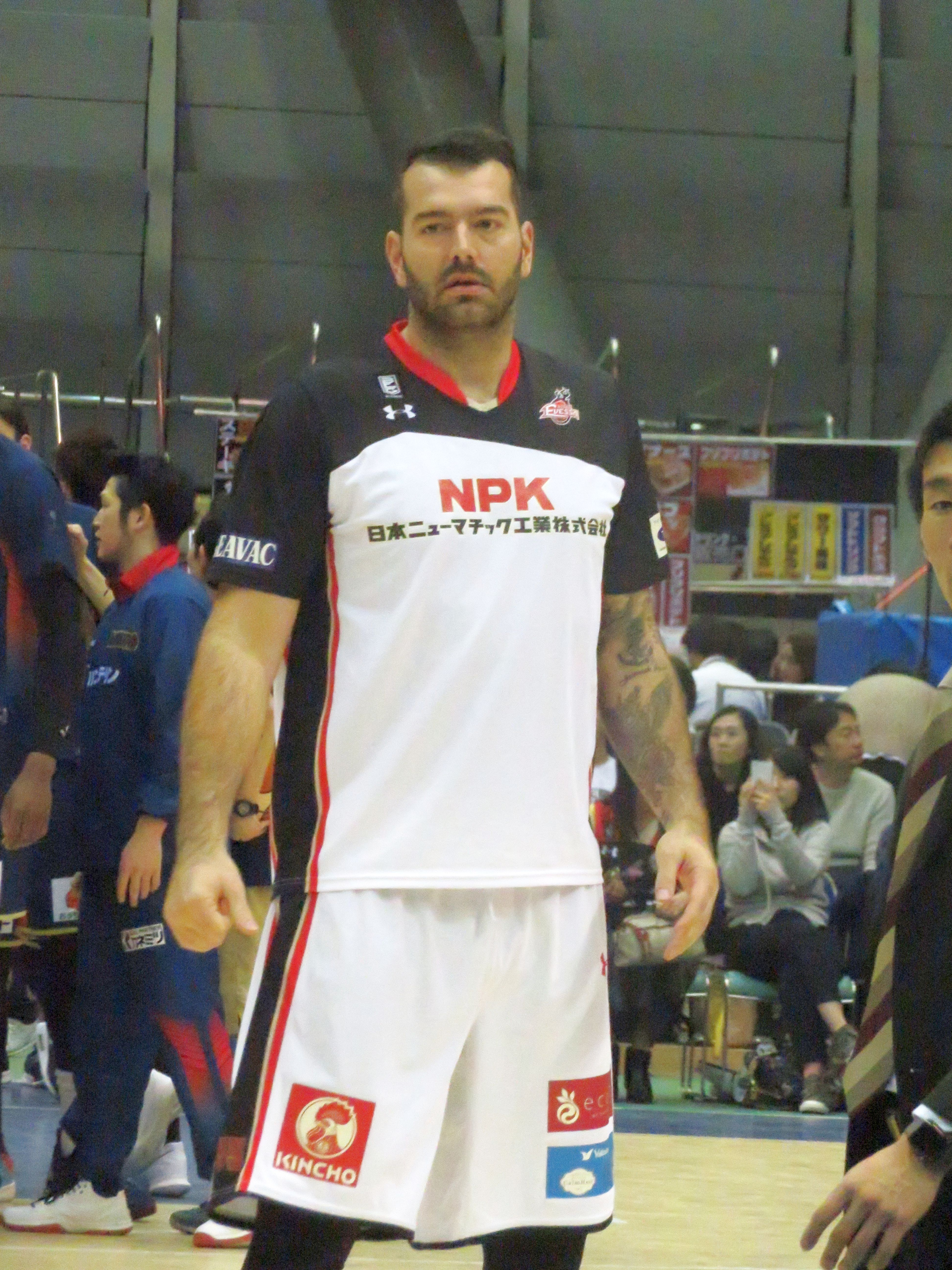
- Harrellson in 2018

No. 55 – San-en NeoPhoenix
- Position: Center / power forward
- League: B.League

Personal information
- Born: February 12, 1989 (age 37) St. Charles, Missouri, U.S.
- Listed height: 6 ft 10 in (2.08 m)
- Listed weight: 275 lb (125 kg)

Career information
- High school: St. Charles (St. Charles, Missouri)
- College: Southwestern Illinois (2007–2008); Kentucky (2008–2011)
- NBA draft: 2011: 2nd round, 45th overall pick
- Drafted by: New Orleans Hornets
- Playing career: 2011–present

Career history
- 2011–2012: New York Knicks
- 2012–2013: Miami Heat
- 2013: Brujos de Guayama
- 2013: Chongqing Flying Dragons
- 2013–2014: Detroit Pistons
- 2014: Chongqing Flying Dragons
- 2015: Brujos de Guayama
- 2015–2016: VEF Rīga
- 2016–2017: Osaka Evessa
- 2017–2018: Sun Rockers Shibuya
- 2018–2021: Osaka Evessa
- 2021–2022: Sun Rockers Shibuya
- 2022–2023: Fukushima Firebonds
- 2023–2026: Saga Ballooners
- 2026–present: San-en NeoPhoenix

Career highlights
- NBL Player of the Year (2013)
- Stats at NBA.com
- Stats at Basketball Reference

Josh Douglas Harrellson (born February 12, 1989) is an American professional basketball player for San-en NeoPhoenix of the Japanese B.League. Standing 6 ft 10 in (2.08 m), he played center for the Kentucky Wildcats from 2008 to 2011. He was selected by the New Orleans Hornets as the 45th pick in the 2011 NBA draft, but was traded to the New York Knicks. He signed with the Miami Heat in 2012. In 2013, he joined the Brujos de Guayama in Puerto Rico, but he was released on May 18 so that he could join Chongqing Flying Dragons in the Chinese National Basketball League for a two-month period. In August 2013, Harrellson joined the Detroit Pistons.

Harrellson first played organized basketball as a freshman at St. Charles High School. Coach Gary Wacker helped develop Harrellson's skills, and he was named a first-team All-State player his junior and senior years. He signed a National Letter of Intent to play for Western Illinois University, but never enrolled there, choosing instead to attend junior college at Southwestern Illinois College. After one year at Southwest Illinois, he was recruited to Kentucky by then-coach Billy Gillispie. Gillispie was fired after Harrellson's first season, and Harrellson played sparingly the next year under new coach John Calipari. Due to the ineligibility of star recruit Enes Kanter, Harrellson received significantly more playing time his senior year, during which he averaged 6.4 points per game and led the Southeastern Conference in rebounding with 8.8 per game. In the 2011 NCAA tournament, he was named to the All-East Region Team.

== High school career ==
Harrellson had never played organized basketball prior to 2003, his freshman year at St. Charles High School. St. Charles boys' basketball coach Gary Wacker noticed Harrellson, who stood six feet, four inches tall as a high school freshman, when he came to the football coach's office to ask about tryouts. When Harrellson showed up too late for football tryouts, Wacker encouraged him to try playing basketball. Wacker later recalled that, when he first started practice, he could not dribble or make a left-handed layup, and Harrellson himself conceded that he was "pretty much the worst player on the team." Before the end of his first season, however, he was playing on the junior varsity team, and by his sophomore year, he was playing with the varsity team.

Harrellson had a difficult home life, and eventually moved in with his AAU basketball coach. By his junior year, he had grown to 6 feet, 8 inches tall; he averaged 18.1 points and 11 rebounds for the season and was named a first team All-State player. After taking only one recruiting visit, he signed a National Letter of Intent to play for the Western Illinois Leathernecks prior to his senior year. He averaged 18.5 points, 10.5 rebounds, 3.6 blocked shots, 1.5 assists and 1.3 steals during his final season of high school basketball, while leading St. Charles to the Class 4 state semi-finals. He was named second team All-Metro by the St. Louis Post-Dispatch and was again named first team All-State. He finished his high school career with 1,325 points and 794 rebounds. After the season, he participated in summer workouts with University of Florida-bound Alex Tyus from nearby Hazelwood Central High School; during these workouts, he became convinced he could play basketball for a higher-profile university.

== College career ==
Before enrolling at Western Illinois, Harrellson asked to be released from his letter of intent, citing rumors that head coach Derek Thomas was about to be fired and his desire to play for a higher-profile school. Western Illinois refused to grant the request. Instead of playing for Western Illinois, Harrellson decided to matriculate to a junior college. His parents divorced following his high school graduation, and he chose Southwestern Illinois College because it was close to home. Harrellson joined future Alabama forward Chris Hines and future Minnesota guard Devron Bostick on the SWIC basketball team, and during the 2007–08 season, he averaged 14 points and 8 rebounds. His team compiled a 28–5 record, won the Great Rivers Athletic Conference, and advanced to the National Junior College Athletic Association regional championship game. Harrellson was named first-team all-conference and all-region.

In March 2008, Western Illinois fired coach Derek Thomas, and Harrellson was released from his Letter of Intent in April of that year. Harrellson first expressed interest in transferring to the University of Missouri, but the school had no basketball scholarships available. He considered scholarship offers from Iowa, Iowa State, St. Louis, Indiana, Illinois and Kentucky. His final decision was between St. Louis and Kentucky. Despite his desire to stay close to home, in part because of his parents' recent divorce, Harrellson chose Kentucky because of the chance for better exposure, which would lead to an opportunity to play professional basketball.

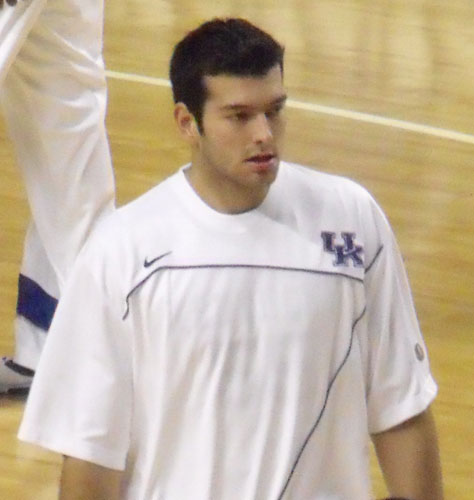
Harrellson in 2009

In his first year at Kentucky, Harrellson played in 34 games, starting in 2. He was named to the Las Vegas Invitational All-Tournament Team; he posted his first career double-double (12 points, 10 rebounds) in the tournament's championship game against the West Virginia Mountaineers. The game was one of only six all season in which Harrellson tallied at least 10 points. At halftime of a game against the Vanderbilt Commodores in Nashville on February 17, 2009, Kentucky coach Billy Gillispie ordered Harrellson to listen to the game plan from a bathroom stall. After the game, Gillispie made Harrellson ride back to Lexington in the equipment van instead of on the bus with his teammates.

Kentucky fired Gillispie at the end of the season, replacing him with John Calipari. Calipari quickly assembled a highly touted recruiting class that required more scholarships than Kentucky had to offer and held workouts to determine which of the players then on scholarship would best fit into his system. Sophomore A. J. Stewart and freshman Donald Williams decided to transfer, while senior Jared Carter decided not to apply for a medical redshirt. Harrellson impressed Calipari and remained on the team. However, playing behind Patrick Patterson, DeMarcus Cousins, Daniel Orton, and Perry Stevenson, Harrellson played a total of 88 minutes over 22 games during the season. He averaged 1.3 points and 1.2 rebounds per game, and his season high in points was five.

Following the 2009–2010 season, Harrellson and teammate Jon Hood played nine games in China as part of an exhibition team assembled by Campbellsville, Kentucky-based Sports Reach. Playing against teams from China and Russia, Harrellson averaged 13.1 points and 9.2 rebounds. He said that the experience boosted his confidence after receiving limited playing time during the previous season.

Harrellson grabbed 26 rebounds in the Blue-White scrimmage prior to the 2010–11 basketball season. When asked about the performance, Calipari remarked, "Either we are the worst offensive rebounding team in America or he's gotten better." Harrellson took exception to Calipari's lack of praise and tweeted, "Just amazing to me I can't get a good job or way to go. Yes he has been working hard this off season ... It is just amazing to me but I look past it and keep trucking!" Calipari then ordered Harrellson to shut down his Twitter account and to do extra conditioning drills as punishment. Harrellson made these drills part of his regular workout and credited them for improving his physical condition.

Harrellson was pressed into playing heavy minutes by the NCAA's decision to rule teammate Enes Kanter ineligible for accepting excessive benefits from a professional team in Turkey. Harrellson started every game for the Wildcats during the 2010–11 season. He achieved career highs in points (24) and rebounds (14) against in-state rival Louisville on December 31, 2010, but regressed once conference play began. He nevertheless led the conference in rebounding with 8.8 per game, and scored 6.4 points per game during the regular season. During the 2011 Southeastern Conference tournament, he averaged 10.3 points per game and was named to the All-Tournament team.

In the 2011 NCAA tournament, Harrellson averaged 13 points and 8 rebounds, including a 17-point, 10-rebound, 3-block performance against Ohio State All-American Jared Sullinger in the third round. He followed up with 12 points, 8 rebounds, and a career-high 4 assists in the regional finals against Tyler Zeller of the North Carolina Tar Heels, helping the Wildcats reach the Final Four. After the game, Harrellson was named to the All-East Region Tournament team along with teammates DeAndre Liggins and Brandon Knight, who was named the region's most outstanding player. In his final game as a Wildcat, a one-point loss to the Connecticut Huskies in the national semi-finals, Harrellson managed only 6 points and 4 rebounds.

Harrellson was invited to the 2011 Portsmouth Invitational Tournament, widely regarded as a chance for college seniors to showcase their skills for NBA scouts, but withdrew from the tournament on the advice of University of Kentucky medical staff after the emergence of flu-like symptoms. Basketball analyst David Aldridge ranked Harrellson as the eighth best center available in the 2019 NBA draft. He was projected as a possible early-to-mid-second-round pick in the draft.

While at the University of Kentucky he earned the nickname "Jorts" (slang for jean shorts) because he was often seen wearing them.

== Professional career ==
Harrellson was drafted in the second round (45th overall) of the 2011 NBA draft by the New Orleans Hornets, but was traded to the New York Knicks for cash considerations reportedly between $700,000 and $750,000.

On December 31, 2011, he started for the first time for the injured Amar'e Stoudemire and achieved his first double-double against the Sacramento Kings with 14 points, going 4 of 8 from the 3-point line, and 12 rebounds.

During the 2011–12 NBA season, Harrellson was injured after appearing in 16 games. He missed several games to recover from wrist surgery. His first game back was on February 29, 2012, against the Cavaliers.

On July 11, 2012, Harrellson was traded by the Knicks to the Houston Rockets along with Toney Douglas, Jerome Jordan and second-round picks in 2014 and 2015 for Marcus Camby. On August 15, 2012, Harrellson was waived by the Rockets.

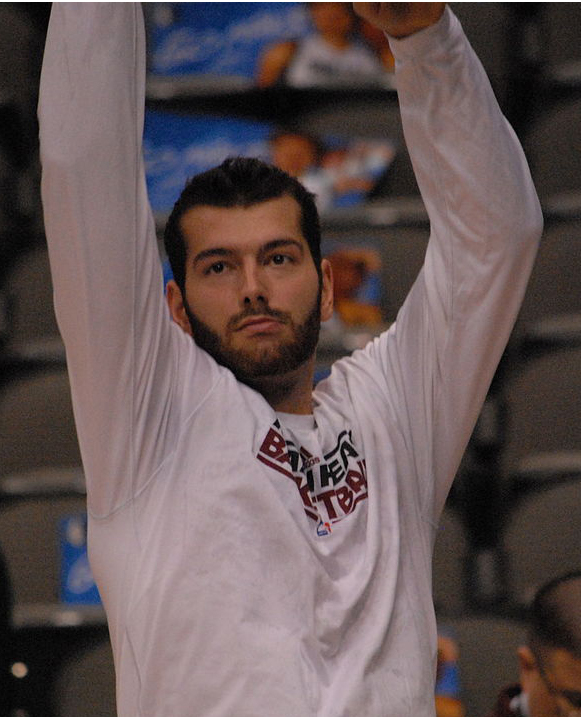
Harrellson with Miami

On September 17, 2012, Harrellson signed with the Miami Heat. On January 7, 2013, he was waived by the Heat. During his time with the Heat, he averaged 1.7 ppg, 1.2 rebounds, and 0.2 blocks in 5.2 minutes of play. However, he was re-signed on a ten-day contract on January 10, 2013. He later played for the Brujos de Guayama in Puerto Rico and the Chongqing Flying Dragons in China. While playing in China, Harrellson averaged 22.3 points, 18.2 rebounds, 1.9 assists, 1.5 blocks and 1.2 steals to win the NBL Player of the Year award.

On August 21, 2013, Harrellson signed with the Detroit Pistons. On July 15, 2014, he was waived by the Pistons.

On September 23, 2014, Harrellson signed with the Chongqing Flying Dragons for the team's first season in the Chinese Basketball Association. He left the team in December 2014 after appearing in 14 games.

On February 14, 2015, Harrellson re-signed with Brujos de Guayama.

In July 2015, Harrellson joined the Phoenix Suns for the 2015 NBA Summer League. On September 25, 2015, he signed with the Washington Wizards. However, he was later waived by the Wizards on October 24 after appearing in seven preseason games. On December 18, 2015, he signed with Latvian club VEF Rīga for the rest of the season.

In August 2016, Harrellson signed with Japanese club Osaka Evessa for the 2016–17 season. The following summer he came terms with the Sun Rockers Shibuya. Harrellson later rejoined Osaka. In the 2019–20 season, he averaged 19.8 points, 12.7 rebounds, 2.9 assists, and 1.1 blocks per game.

== NBA career statistics ==
Legend
GP	Games played	GS	Games started	MPG	Minutes per game
FG%	Field goal percentage	3P%	3-point field goal percentage	FT%	Free throw percentage
RPG	Rebounds per game	APG	Assists per game	SPG	Steals per game
BPG	Blocks per game	PPG	Points per game	**Bold**	Career high

=== Regular season ===
Year	Team	GP	GS	MPG	FG%	3P%	FT%	RPG	APG	SPG	BPG	PPG
2011–12	New York	**37**	**4**	**14.6**	.423	.339	.615	**3.9**	.3	**.6**	**.5**	**4.4**
2012–13	Miami	6	0	5.2	.444	.200	.500	1.2	.0	.2	.2	1.7
2013–14	Detroit	32	0	9.9	**.463**	**.387**	**.714**	2.4	**.5**	.2	**.5**	2.9
Career		75	4	11.8	.438	.347	.629	3.0	.3	.5	.4	3.5

=== Playoffs ===
Year	Team	GP	GS	MPG	FG%	3P%	FT%	RPG	APG	SPG	BPG	PPG
2012	New York	4	0	6.3	.444	.000	1.000	2.0	.0	.0	.0	2.5
Career		4	0	6.3	.444	.000	1.000	2.0	.0	.0	.0	2.5

== Personal life ==
Harrellson was born February 12, 1989, in St. Charles, Missouri. He is the son of Doug Harrellson, a construction worker, and Karen Harrellson. He has a brother and sister, and four nieces and nephews. He is married and has a daughter named Arianna.

In August 2011, Harrellson noticed a drunk man attempting to drive from a bar in Lexington, Kentucky. The man slammed into Harrellson's parked car before attempting to take off, severely damaging it, and Harrellson and his friends helped ground the car and remove the keys from its ignition.

== Bibliography ==
- Aldridge, David (May 16, 2011). "As usual, center crop has bevy of high risk-reward prospects". NBA.com.
- Astleford, Andrew (March 30, 2011). "Missouri native Harrellson reaching NCAA peak". Fox Sports Midwest.
- Berman, Zach (March 26, 2011). "Kentucky vs. Ohio State: Wildcats' Josh Harrellson comes up big against Buckeyes' Jared Sullinger". Newark Star-Ledger.
- Bozich, Rick (March 31, 2011). "Kentucky's Josh Harrellson found new life in 'suicides'". Cincinnati.com.
- Clay, John (May 16, 2009). "UK workouts are also tryouts". Lexington Herald-Leader.
- Dortch, Chris (April 4, 2011). "Social media helps Kentucky's Harrellson become NBA prospect". NBA.com.
- Durando, Stu (March 28, 2011). "Harrellson's change of heart lands him in Final Four". St. Louis Post-Dispatch.
- Fagan, Ryan. "The long and the jorts of it: UK's Harrellson grows up to dominate". The Sporting News. Archived from the original on April 4, 2011.
- Graves, Will (February 8, 2011). "Josh's Journey Winding Down". The Gleaner.
- Gump, Chris (July 11, 2008). "New Cat Let Game Come to Him – Didn't Play Before Freshman Year". St. Charles Journal.
- Harrellson, Josh (April 5, 2011). "Harrellson withdraws from Portsmouth". UKAthletics.com.
- Juliano, Joe (March 31, 2011). "Kentucky's Harrellson turned season around after a mistake". The Philadelphia Inquirer. Archived from the original on March 30, 2012.
- "Kentucky-North Carolina Postgame Notes". UKAthletics.com. March 27, 2011.
- Megargee, Steve (March 21, 2011). "Harrellson has become center of attention". Yahoo! Sports.
- Mink, Nate (April 2, 2011). "Kentucky's Harrellson stands tall despite defeat". NCAA.org.
- Monter, Chris (November 9, 2007). "Devron Bostick Scores 16 points in Opener". Scout.com.
- Neunuebel, Greg (January 1, 2009). "At the next level". St. Louis Post-Dispatch.
- "Player Profile: Josh Harrellson". UKAthletics.com.
- Schlabach, Mark (March 27, 2011). "Josh Harrellson's turnaround key to UK". ESPN.com.
- Sheridan, Chris (June 23, 2011). "Knicks purchase 45th pick from Hornets". ESPN.com.
- Story, Mark (April 2, 2011). "Josh Harrellson's joy ride is over at Kentucky". Lexington-Herald Leader.
- Tipton, Jerry (April 16, 2008). "Cats begin spring recruiting". Lexington Herald-Leader.
- Tipton, Jerry (November 6, 2010). "'Dumbest' move turns to gold". Lexington Herald-Leader.
- Tipton, Jerry (March 1, 2011). "Forgotten to formidable". Lexington Herald-Leader.
- Tipton, Jerry (May 27, 2009). "Four Cats leaving the program". Lexington Herald-Leader.
- Tipton, Jerry (February 11, 2011). "Harrellson appears to regain lost focus". Lexington Herald-Leader.
- Tipton, Jerry (April 30, 2008). "Harrellson commits to UK". Lexington Herald-Leader.
- Tipton, Jerry (November 6, 2008). "Harrellson's hoops career got late start - UK big man didn't start playing until ninth grade". Lexington Herald-Leader.
- Tipton, Jerry (October 6, 2009). "Last season in Harrellson's rear-view". Lexington Herald-Leader.
- Tipton, Jerry (June 10, 2010). "Two Cats get a chance in China". Lexington Herald-Leader.
- Tipton, Jerry (October 28, 2010). "Young Cats learning do's, don'ts". Lexington Herald-Leader.
- Tomasino, Dan (March 28, 2011). "Kentucky's Harrellson draws cheers for role". New York Post.
- "Wildcats Return Home for Four Straight". UKAthletics.com. December 2, 2008.
