= City of St. Charles School District =

School district in Missouri, U.S.

Address
- 600 N 6th Street St. Charles, Missouri, 63301; United States
- Coordinates: 38°47′17″N 90°29′09″W

District information
- Type: Public
- Motto: A Proud Past...An Enlightened Future
- Grades: Preschool through 12th grade
- Established: 1846; 180 years ago
- Superintendent: Dr. Jason Sefrit.
- NCES District ID: 2928920

Students and staff
- Enrollment: 4,792 (2020-2021)
- Faculty: 852
- Student–teacher ratio: 10.49

Other information
- Website: www.stcharlessd.org

St. Charles R-VI School District, also known as the City of St. Charles School District, is a School district in St. Charles, Missouri. The Administration Building of the School District is located at 600 N 6th St, St Charles, MO 63301.

The district, in St. Charles County, includes the majority of St. Charles and portions of St. Peters.

== Schools ==
=== High schools ===
- St. Charles High School
- St. Charles West High School

=== Middle schools ===
- Hardin Middle School
- Jefferson Intermediate Middle School

=== Elementary schools ===
- Harris Elementary School
- Monroe Elementary School
- George M. Null Elementary School
- Coverdell Elementary School
- Blackhurst Elementary School
- Lincoln Elementary School

== Other ==
- Lewis and Clark Career Center
- Success Campus, an alternative school for students with a lack of credits
