= John Calipari =

American college basketball coach (born 1959)

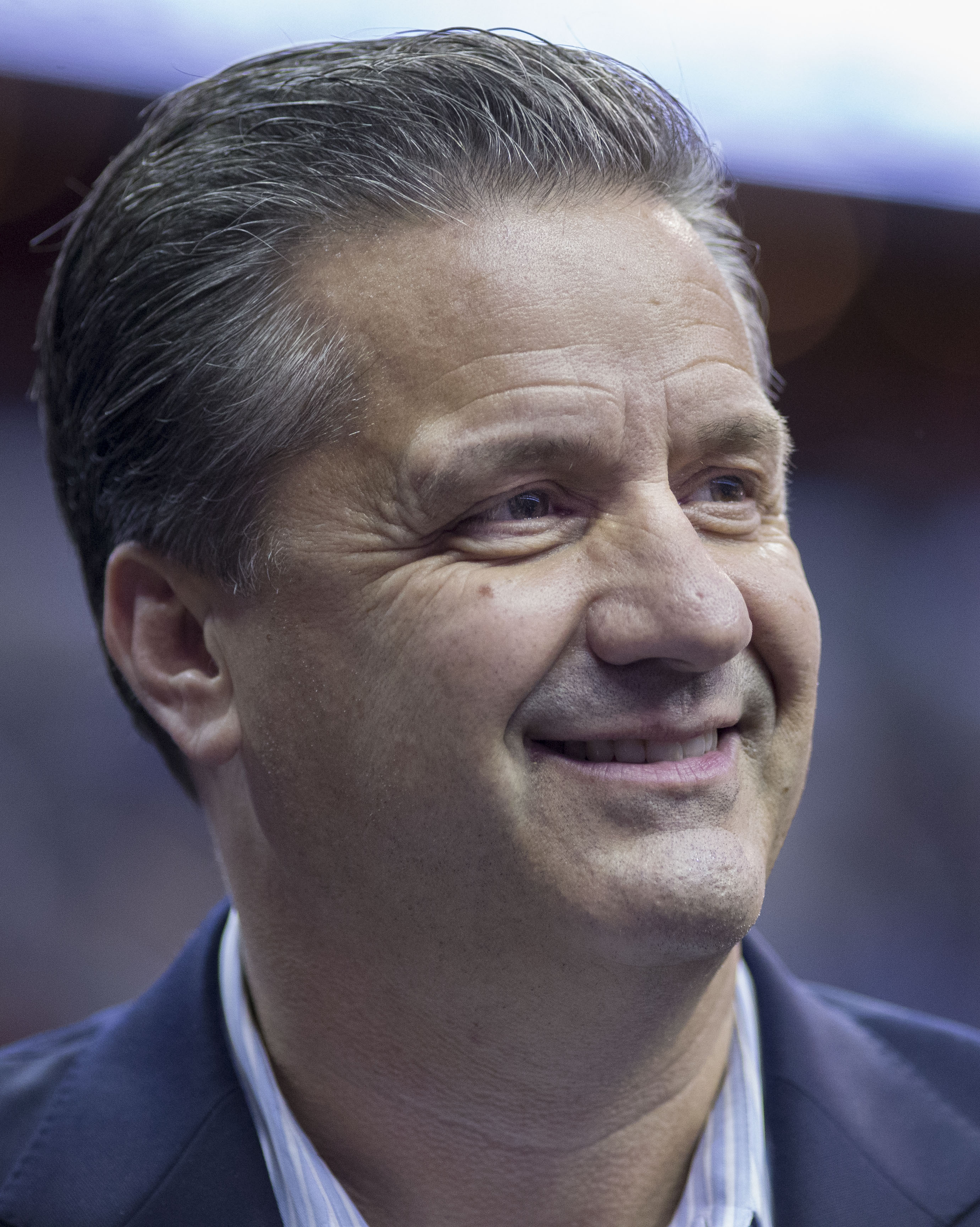
- Calipari in 2014

Current position
- Title: Head coach
- Team: Arkansas
- Conference: SEC
- Record: 50–23 (.685)
- Annual salary: $7.5 million

Biographical details
- Born: February 10, 1959 (age 67); Moon Township, Pennsylvania, U.S.

Playing career
- 1978–1980: UNC Wilmington
- 1980–1982: Clarion
- Position: Point guard

Coaching career (HC unless noted)
- 1982–1985: Kansas (associate assistant)
- 1985–1988: Pittsburgh (assistant)
- 1988–1996: UMass
- 1996–1999: New Jersey Nets
- 1999–2000: Philadelphia 76ers (assistant)
- 2000–2009: Memphis
- 2009–2024: Kentucky
- 2024–present: Arkansas

Head coaching record
- Overall: 905–286 (.760) (NCAA); 72–112 (.391) (NBA)
- Tournaments: 61–24 (NCAA Division I); 15–6 (NIT)

Accomplishments and honors

Championships
- NCAA Division I tournament (2012); 6 NCAA Division I tournament Final Four (1996*, 2008*, 2011, 2012, 2014, 2015); NIT (2002); 5 A10 tournament (1992–1996); 5 A10 regular season (1992–1996); 4 C-USA tournament (2006–2009); 5 C-USA regular season (2004, 2006–2009); 7 SEC tournament (2010, 2011, 2015–2018, 2026); 6 SEC regular season (2010, 2012, 2015–2017, 2020); SEC East regular season (2010); * Vacated by the NCAA

Awards
- 3× Naismith College Coach of the Year (1996, 2008, 2015); AP College Coach of the Year (2015); 3× NABC Coach of the Year (1996, 2009, 2015); 2× Basketball Times Coach of the Year (1996, 2015); 2× Adolph Rupp Cup (2010, 2015); Jim Phelan National Coach of the Year (2009); 3× A10 Coach of the Year (1993, 1994, 1996); 3× C-USA Coach of the Year (2006, 2008, 2009); 4× SEC Coach of the Year (2010, 2012, 2015, 2020)
- Basketball Hall of Fame; Inducted in 2015 (profile)
Medal record
Head coach for Dominican Republic
Dominican Republic national team
FIBA Americas Championship
Bronze medal – third place	2011 Mar del Plata	Men's basketball
Centrobasket
Gold medal – first place	2012 Puerto Rico	Men's basketball
Marchand Cup
Bronze medal – third place	2011 Marchand Cup	Men's basketball
Head coach for United States
United States men's national under-19 basketball team
FIBA Under-19 World Cup
Bronze medal – third place	2017 Egypt	National team

John Vincent Calipari (/ˌkælɪˈpæri/; born February 10, 1959) is an American basketball coach who is the head coach at the University of Arkansas. He has been named Naismith College Coach of the Year three times (1996, 2008, and 2015), and was inducted into the Basketball Hall of Fame in 2015.

Previously, he was the head coach at the University of Massachusetts from 1988 to 1996, the NBA's New Jersey Nets from 1996 to 1999, the University of Memphis from 2000 to 2009, and the University of Kentucky from 2009 to 2024. During the 2011–2012 season, he led Kentucky to a national championship. Additionally, he was the head coach of the Dominican Republic national team in the summers of 2011 and 2012 as well as the United States men's national under-19 basketball team in July 2017.

Calipari coached Kentucky to four Final Fours in 2011, 2012, 2014 and 2015. He also led UMass and Memphis to the Final Four in 1996 and 2008 respectively; those appearances were later vacated, though Calipari was cleared of wrongdoing in both cases. As a college coach, Calipari has twenty-nine 20-win seasons, eleven 30-win seasons, and five 35-win seasons.

As of March 2026, with 900 official wins, Calipari ranks 5th on the NCAA Division I all-time winningest coaches list.

== Early life ==
Calipari was born in Moon Township, Pennsylvania to a working-class Italian-American household. His paternal grandparents immigrated from Rivisondoli, in the Abruzzo region of southern Italy. His early life was deeply integrated with Moon Area High School, where he was point guard for the varsity basketball team. Known for an early entrepreneurial spirit, he frequently organized summer league games and directed youth basketball camps throughout the region before graduating in 1978.

== Playing career ==
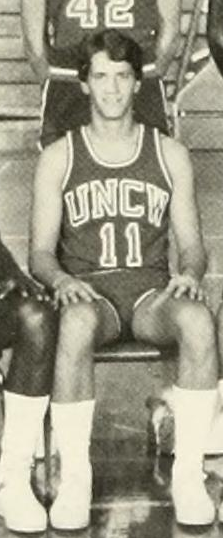
John Calipari, 1979–1980 UNCW basketball team

Calipari lettered two years at UNC Wilmington before transferring to Clarion University of Pennsylvania, from which he graduated with a bachelor's degree in marketing. He played point guard at Clarion during the 1981 and 1982 seasons, leading the team in assists and free throw percentage.

== Coaching career ==
From 1982 to 1985, Calipari was an assistant at the University of Kansas under Ted Owens and Larry Brown. Calipari had several jobs as the lowest coach in the pecking order when Ted Owens hired him as a volunteer assistant for the Jayhawks' 1982–83 season, including serving food at the training table. "I was blessed to have the chance. Can you imagine being 22, 23 and your first opportunity to be around the game is at a program like Kansas?"

From 1985 to 1988, he was an assistant coach at the University of Pittsburgh under Roy Chipman and Paul Evans. From 1988 to 1996, he was head coach at the University of Massachusetts. From 1996 to 1999, he was head coach and Executive VP of basketball operations for the NBA's New Jersey Nets. During the 1999–2000 season, he was an assistant coach for the Philadelphia 76ers under coach Larry Brown, before moving on to his next position at the University of Memphis.

Calipari is famous for popularizing the dribble drive motion offense, developed by Vance Walberg, which is sometimes known as the "Memphis Attack".

In his 31 official seasons (32 seasons overall) as a collegiate head coach, Calipari's record is 855–263 (.765). His NCAA-adjusted (the records of two appearances being removed) official record in the NCAA tournament is 57–22 (.721), and in the NIT is 15–6 (.714). His teams have made 23 NCAA tournament appearances (21 officially, due to two later being vacated), including reaching the Sweet Sixteen 16 times (14 officially, due to two later being vacated), the Elite Eight 12 times (10 officially, due to two later being vacated), the Final Four six times (four officially, due to two later being vacated), the NCAA Championship Game three times (twice officially, with the 2008 Championship Game appearance while at Memphis being vacated by the NCAA), winning the NCAA Championship at Kentucky in 2012, and finishing NCAA Runner-Up in 2014.

He is one of only four coaches in NCAA Division I history to direct three different schools to a #1 seed in the NCAA Tournament.

=== University of Massachusetts ===
From 1988 to 1996 at UMass, Calipari led the Minutemen program to five consecutive Atlantic 10 titles and NCAA Tournament appearances, including periods where the program was ranked first nationally. He finished with a 193–71 record overall, with a 91–41 record in Atlantic 10 conference games. Calipari was named Atlantic 10 Coach of the Year in 1992, 1993, and 1996. He was also named the Naismith, NABC, Basketball Times & Sporting News National Coach of the Year in 1996. He led UMass to its first-ever appearance in the Final Four with the play of the John R. Wooden Award winner and Naismith College Player of the Year Marcus Camby, although this appearance was later vacated by the NCAA because Camby had accepted about $28,000 worth of gifts, in particular a gold chain, from two sports agents who were luring him to enter the NBA draft after his Sophomore season.

Calipari helped accelerate the construction of the Mullins Center, UMass' basketball and hockey facility. He also reached out to eastern Massachusetts and Boston to enlarge the fan base. Before moving on to the New Jersey Nets, Calipari became the second winningest coach in UMass history behind Jack Leaman.

In 2010, then-ESPN.com writer Pat Forde, in his "Forde Minutes" column, said of the 1992 team:

Calipari's greatest strength as a coach is his ability to create teams that play together. His 1992 Massachusetts team remains one of the most overachieving units The Minutes has ever seen, featuring a shooting guard with range so limited he made one 3-pointer all season (Jim McCoy), a 6-foot-3 power forward (Will Herndon), and a left-handed center who stood all of 6–7 (Harper Williams). Somehow, that collection of marginal talent went 30–5 and advanced to the NCAA Sweet 16.

In the Sweet 16 matchup with Kentucky in 1992, official Lenny Wirtz issued Calipari a controversial technical foul for being outside the coach's box during a crucial UMass possession. Kentucky went on to face Duke in the next round in one of the greatest games in college basketball history, won on a last-second shot by Christian Laettner.

In 1993, UMass defeated defending NCAA champion and preseason #1 North Carolina in the pre-season NIT in Madison Square Garden. The following year #3 UMass defeated defending NCAA champion and #1 Arkansas in the Hall of Fame Tip-Off classic, which resulted in UMass becoming the first New England college basketball team to be voted #1 in the Associated Press poll.

During Calipari's tenure at UMass, the program became one of the most dominant in college basketball despite recruiting just one McDonald's All-American (Donta Bright) and having only two players drafted by an NBA team (Lou Roe and Marcus Camby). Forde recalled the Final Four team in Calipari's final UMass season in 1995–96 as a squad "with one superstar (Marcus Camby) and a collection of complementary parts". By winning both the Atlantic 10 regular season and conference tournament championships from 1992 to 1996, UMass became the second team in college basketball history to win 5 consecutive regular season and conference tournament championships (NC State was the first).

The Calipari Room, a classroom in the Du Bois Library at UMass, is so named in recognition of donations from the Calipari family.

=== New Jersey Nets and Philadelphia 76ers ===
In the 1996–97 season, John Calipari replaced Butch Beard as head coach of the New Jersey Nets. After a 26–56 debut season, the Nets made a major draft-day trade in June 1997, acquiring Keith Van Horn, Lucious Harris and two other players in exchange for Tim Thomas.

In 1997, while coaching the New Jersey Nets, Calipari directed profanities at Star-Ledger sports reporter Dan Garcia and referred to him as a "Mexican idiot". Garcia sued for $5,000,000 for emotional distress. Though the case was dismissed and Calipari apologized for his remarks, he was still fined $25,000 by the NBA.

The 1997–98 season was a lone bright spot for the Nets in the late 1990s. The team played well under Calipari, winning 43 games and qualifying for the playoffs on the last day of the season. The Nets were seeded eighth in the Eastern Conference and lost to the Chicago Bulls in the 1998 playoffs in three straight games.

The 1998–99 season was delayed for three months due to an owners' lockout of the players. When the abbreviated 50-game season began, the Nets were a choice by experts as a surprise team. However, Sam Cassell was injured in the first game and the team started poorly. With the Nets underachieving at 3–15, the Nets traded Cassell to the Milwaukee Bucks, while the Nets acquired Stephon Marbury from the Minnesota Timberwolves. After two more losses, Calipari was fired as head coach with the team at 3–17. He finished his tenure with an overall record of 72 wins and 112 losses and a .391 overall winning percentage. He then joined Larry Brown as an assistant coach for the Philadelphia 76ers.

=== University of Memphis ===
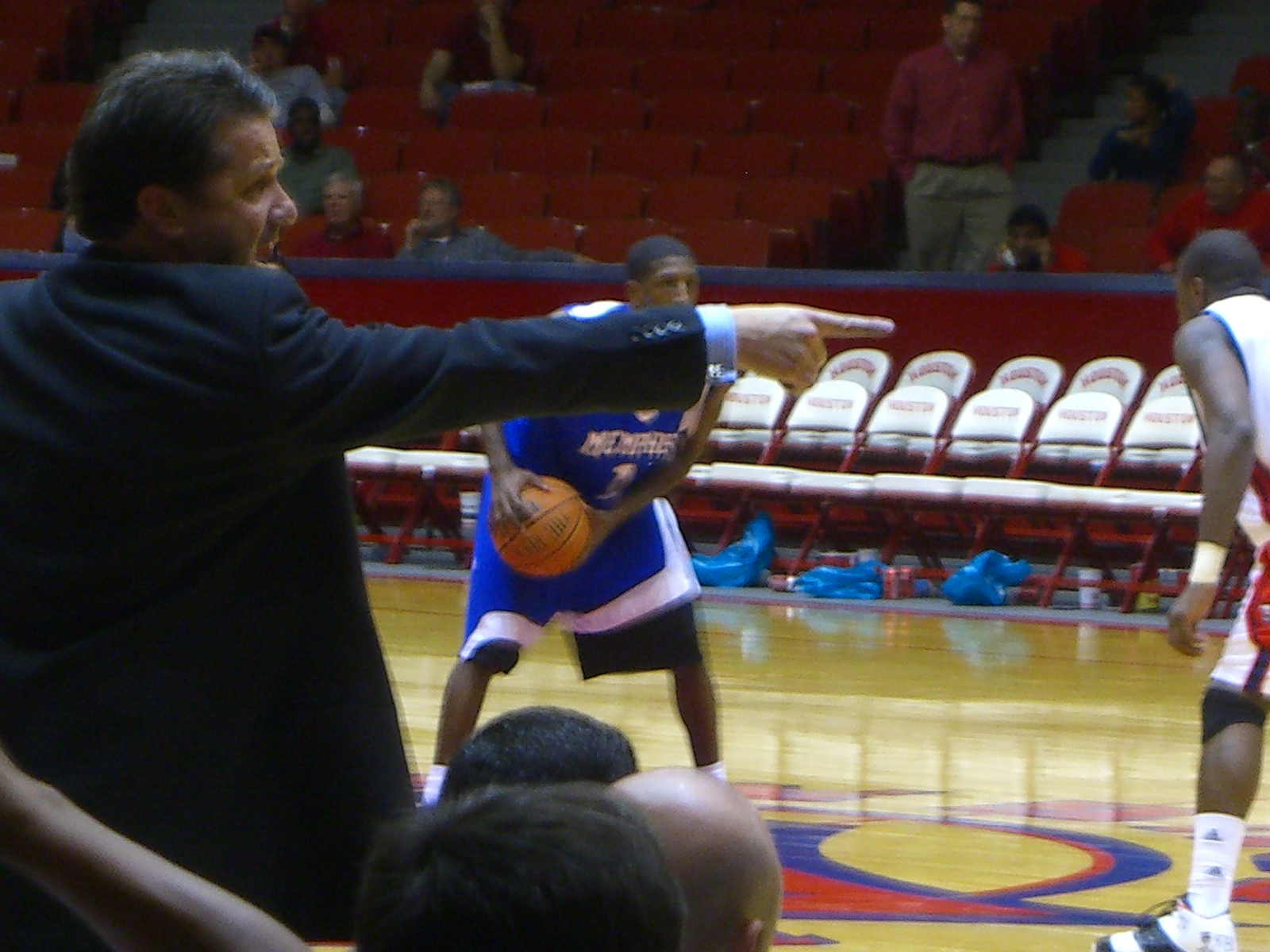
Calipari directing his University of Memphis players during an away game against Conference USA rival University of Houston in January 2007.

Calipari became head coach at the University of Memphis in 2000. In Calipari's first nine years as head coach at Memphis, he won 214 games (38 wins were vacated) and posted seven consecutive 20-win seasons, plus one more in his final season (including an NCAA record four consecutive 30-win seasons, though the third season was vacated and this record no longer holds). He also earned seven consecutive postseason bids (plus one in his final season). His 2007–2008 team's 38 victories set a new NCAA Division I Men's Basketball record for most victories in a season, a record that now belongs to the 2011–2012 Kentucky Wildcats due to NCAA violations that vacated all of Memphis' wins. The nine consecutive 20-win seasons and the nine consecutive postseason appearances would have been the most in school history, though that officially stands now at seven because of the vacated 2007–08 season. He was named Conference USA Coach of the Year in 2006, 2008, and 2009. In 2008, he was named Naismith College Coach of the Year, receiving the honor for the second time. In 2009, he was named Sports Illustrated College Basketball Coach of the Year.

He built a national program by recruiting blue chip players from the Eastern part of the country, such as Dajuan Wagner from Camden (NJ), Darius Washington Jr. from Orlando (FL), Rodney Carney from Indianapolis (IN), Shawne Williams from Memphis (TN), Joey Dorsey from Baltimore (MD), Chris Douglas-Roberts from Detroit (MI), Antonio Anderson from Lynn (MA), Robert Dozier from Lithonia (GA), Derrick Rose from Chicago (IL), and Tyreke Evans from Aston (PA).

While at Memphis, Calipari popularized the dribble drive motion offense that was invented by former Pepperdine basketball coach Vance Walberg.

On January 21, 2008, Calipari led the Tigers to the No. 1 ranking in the AP Poll for only the second time in school history.

In 2006 and 2008, Memphis earned a No. 1 seed in the NCAA men's basketball tournament. In 2008, Calipari's Tigers advanced to the national championship game, their first under his leadership. They also won 38 games, the most regular-season wins in NCAA history (his 2011–12 Kentucky team would also go on to win 38 games). His team, however, would lose to the Kansas Jayhawks, 75–68, in overtime. This team later had its entire season record vacated by the NCAA because the Educational Testing Service (ETS), which administers the SAT college admissions test, invalidated Derrick Rose's score on that test. Despite this, Rose still denies any wrongdoing. The NCAA began to investigate the test and contacted the ETS. Because the NCAA had begun to investigate, ETS decided to review the test. The ETS sent three letters to Rose's family's former address in Chicago (instead of his dorm in Memphis) to ask that Rose verify some information on his test. Because he did not reply to the letters, ETS invalidated his SAT. This happened even though the NCAA investigated and reported that they could not find significant evidence to prove that Rose did not take the test. Because the ETS had invalidated the test, the NCAA retroactively declared Rose ineligible. To this day, the official position of the NCAA is that Rose did take his own SAT. If not for the vacated wins, Calipari would be the winningest coach in Tigers history, as he would have 252 wins to Larry Finch's 220.

On May 28, 2010, John Calipari, Derrick Rose, and University of Memphis athletic director R.C. Johnson reached a $100,000 out-of-court settlement with three attorneys who represented Memphis season ticket holders and threatened a lawsuit over the vacated 2007–08 season. Also as part of the settlement, Calipari donated his near-$232,000 bonus to the Memphis scholarship fund.

=== University of Kentucky ===
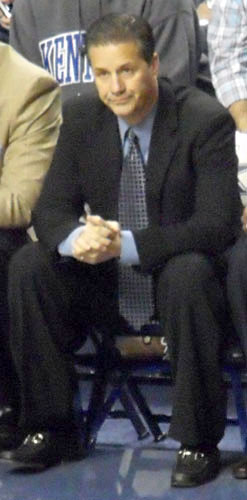
Calipari on the bench for the Kentucky Wildcats, 2009

On March 30, 2009, four days after Memphis' season ending loss to Missouri in the NCAA tournament, multiple sources reported that Calipari would agree to be the head coach at the University of Kentucky, after UK's head coach, Billy Gillispie, was fired after two unsuccessful seasons at the school. Calipari rejected a counter offer by Memphis for Kentucky's 8 year, $31.65 million contract.

According to university officials, John Calipari signed a written contract on March 31, 2009. The contract was worth $34.65 million over 8 years, plus incentives. On April 1, 2009, the University of Kentucky Director of Athletics, Mitch Barnhart, formally introduced John Calipari as the new coach of the University of Kentucky Wildcats. During the press conference, Calipari spoke at length about his relationships with former UK basketball players and coaches, and also in his difficulties in accepting the UK job, largely due to his deep emotional ties with both the city of Memphis and University of Memphis. Calipari stated, "Coming to UK was the easy part, it was leaving the city of Memphis that was the hard part." He went on to refer to the University of Kentucky coaching position as his "dream job". Calipari became the 22nd coach overall at Kentucky, and just the 7th coach in the last 79 years for the Wildcats.

==== 2009–10 ====
In his first year as head coach, Calipari had a highly touted recruiting class, including the No. 1 overall rated recruit, John Wall, plus fellow 5-star recruits, DeMarcus Cousins, Eric Bledsoe, and Daniel Orton. On December 21, 2009, Calipari led the Cats to their 12th victory of the season and the program's 2,000th all-time victory. Kentucky won its 44th SEC Regular Season Championship in 2009–10, with a 14–2 conference record. Calipari's team followed this up with UK's 26th SEC Tournament Championship, with an overtime defeat of Mississippi State, 75–74, in the SEC Tournament title game. In the NCAA Tournament, however, No. 1 seed Kentucky (East Region) was upset by West Virginia in the Elite 8, to finish the season at 35–3.

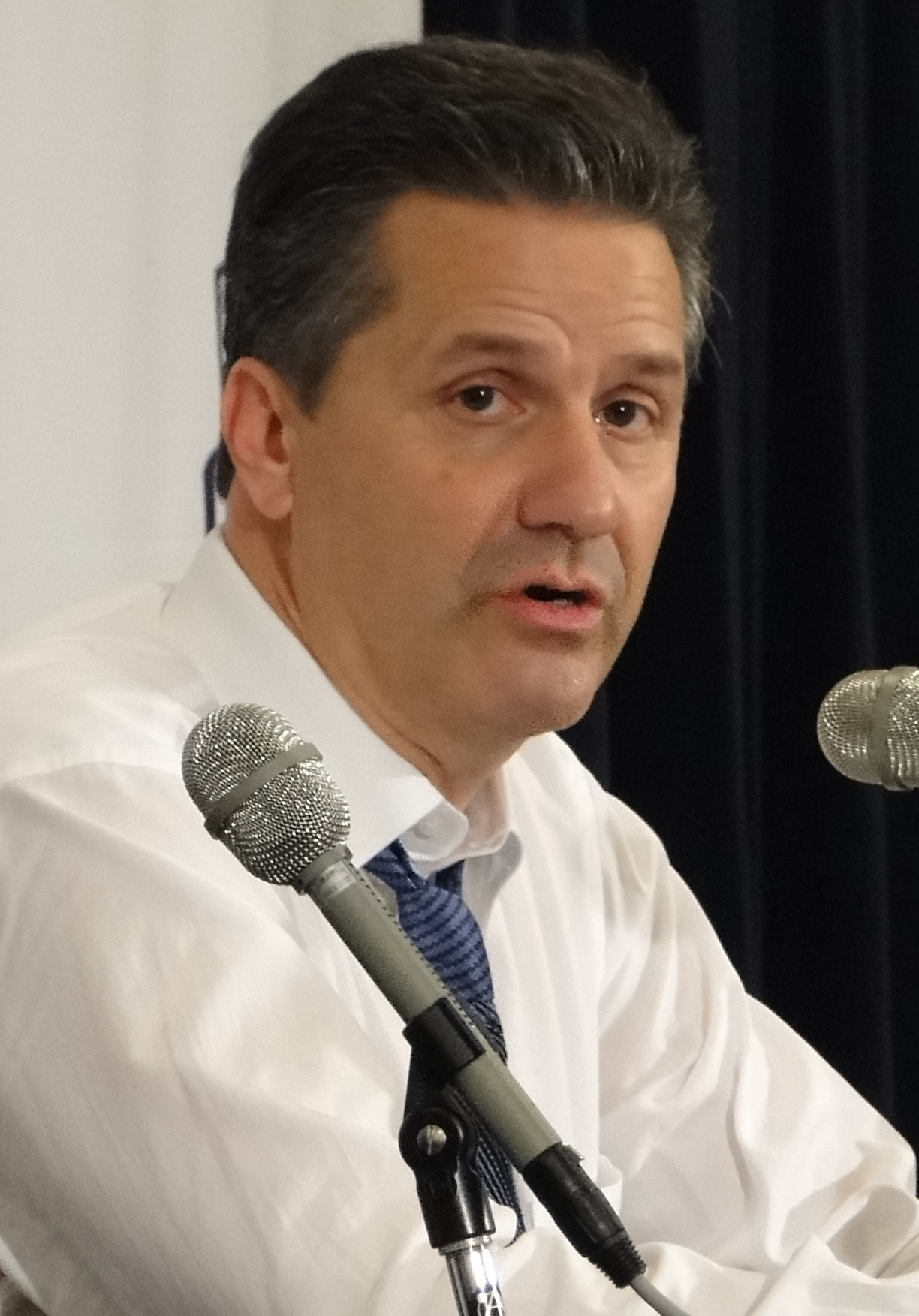
Calipari in 2011

==== 2010–11 ====
In his second season at Kentucky, Calipari recruited the No. 1 rated point guard in the 2010 class, Brandon Knight. In addition to Knight, Calipari also signed two other 5-star recruits, Terrence Jones and Doron Lamb. In 2010–11, Kentucky finished the regular season with a record of 22–8, with a 10–6 record in SEC regular season play. UK would go on to win its second consecutive SEC Tournament Championship, defeating Florida, 70–54, in the SEC Tournament title game. As a result, Kentucky received a No. 4 seed in the NCAA Tournament (East Regional). During the NCAA Tournament, Kentucky would go on to defeat No. 1 overall seed Ohio State, 62–60, in the Sweet-16. In the Elite Eight, Calipari's team would avenge an early season loss to North Carolina, by defeating the Tar Heels, 76–69, securing Kentucky's first Final Four appearance since 1998. In the Final Four, UK fell to the eventual NCAA Champions, UConn, by one point, 56–55, finishing with a final record of 29–9.

==== 2011–12 ====
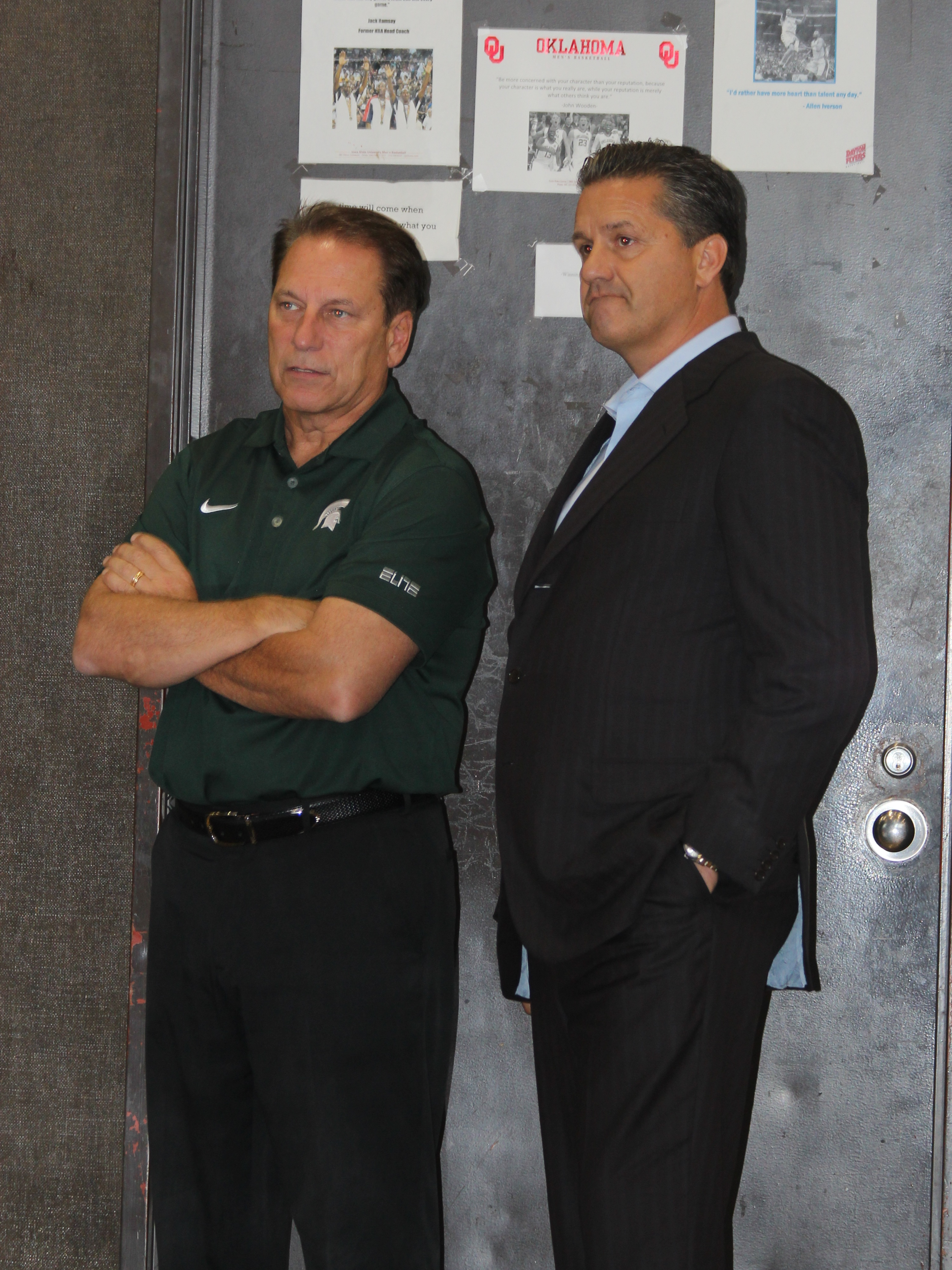
Tom Izzo and Calipari, two of the highest paid college coaches in 2012, talk while scouting a blue chip recruit

In this third season, Kentucky landed another No. 1 recruiting class with four consensus five star players: Anthony Davis, Marquis Teague, Michael Kidd-Gilchrist and Kyle Wiltjer. Kentucky came into the season ranked #2 in the country. They finished the regular season with a 30–1 record, their only loss to Indiana by a buzzer-beater and went 16–0 in conference play. In the SEC tournament, Kentucky lost in the championship game to Vanderbilt 71–64. In the NCAA Tournament, Calipari's team was selected as the overall #1 seed in the tournament, representing as the South Region #1 seed. Kentucky avenged the early season loss to Indiana beating them in the Sweet Sixteen 102–90, and knocked off Baylor in the Elite Eight 82–70, to advance to their second consecutive Final Four. In the Final Four in New Orleans, Kentucky first faced their in-state rival, the Louisville Cardinals and Rick Pitino, winning 69–61. Two days later, in the National Championship game, Kentucky played in another early season rematch against the Kansas Jayhawks, winning a hard-fought contest 67–59. The win secured Calipari his first NCAA Championship, an NCAA record 38-win season, and the 8th overall NCAA Championship for Kentucky. By doing so, John Calipari became the 5th head coach to win an NCAA Championship at Kentucky (an NCAA record), and the first coach to do so at the school since Tubby Smith in 1998.

Following the 2012 championship, UK Athletics Director Mitch Barnhart announced on May 4 that Calipari's contract had been renegotiated. Under the new contract, Calipari would make up to $8 million annually (not including bonuses), which further cemented his status as one of the most highly compensated college basketball coaches in the country.

==== 2014 ====
The platoon system established under John Calipari not only provided life for the University of Kentucky's basketball team in 2014, but it also provided an important defensive weapon. The platoon system was introduced in 2014, and consisted of playing 10 men in legions of five. Each platoon includes three ball-handlers and two taller players.

==== 2019–24 ====
In April 2019, Calipari agreed to a "lifetime" contract with Kentucky, centered on a 10-year coaching extension, and a lifetime paid ambassadorship when he retires.

Following a first round upset loss to the Oakland Golden Grizzlies in the 2024 NCAA Tournament, Calipari announced he would be leaving Kentucky, but did not immediately announce plans to retire or accept another job.

=== University of Arkansas ===
On April 10, 2024, Calipari was named the head coach at Arkansas, signing a 5-year deal worth $7 million a season. The deal also included a signing bonus of $1 million, annual $500,000 retention bonuses, and incentives based on the Razorbacks' NCAA Tournament performances. Calipari purposefully chose to keep his roster small in an 8-9 man rotation, despite having 15 scholarship spots available.

Calipari led the Razorbacks to the Sweet 16 for the fourth time in five years in his first season at the helm. Despite an 0–5 start in the SEC and injuries to his two leading scorers, Calipari rallied his squad to 22 regular season wins. As a 10 seed, his team knocked off a Bill Self-led Kansas team and then a Rick Pitino-led St. John's team before falling to Texas Tech in overtime in the regional semifinals in San Francisco's Chase Center. It was Calipari's first trip to the second weekend since 2019.

In his second season as Arkansas head coach, Calipari led the Razorbacks to a 23–8 overall record. Arkansas played one of the toughest non-conference schedules in the nation, including all eight teams that advanced to the 2025 NCAA Elite Eight. Four of those eight teams were part of their non-conference schedule.

The Razorbacks were led by freshman point guard Darius Acuff Jr., a consensus First-Team All-American and top-10 NBA Draft prospect who earned the SEC Freshman of the Year and SEC Player of the Year honors after the regular season. Calipari's Razorbacks won the 2026 SEC men's basketball tournament championship, improving their overall record to 26–8, with Darius Acuff being named the tournament MVP. In the NCAA Tournament, the Hogs won games against Hawai'i and High Point, eventually falling to 1-seed Arizona.

== College statistics ==
Year	Team	GP	GS	MPG	FG%	3P%	FT%	RPG	APG	SPG	BPG	PPG
1978–79	UNC Wilmington	25	N/A	N/A	.235	N/A	.840	0.3	0.9	0.0	0.0	1.2
1980–81	Clarion	19	N/A	N/A	.457	N/A	.615	0.9	2.6	0.9	0.0	3.1
1981–82	Clarion	27	N/A	N/A	.387	N/A	.717	1.0	5.3	1.3	0.1	5.3

== Head coaching record ==
=== College ===
Record table
Season	Team	Overall	Conference	Standing	Postseason
UMass Minutemen (Atlantic 10 Conference) (1988–1996)
1988–89	UMass	10–18	5–13	8th	
1989–90	UMass	17–14	10–8	6th	NIT First Round
1990–91	UMass	20–13	10–8	T–3rd	NIT Fourth Place
1991–92	UMass	30–5	13–3	1st	NCAA Division I Sweet 16
1992–93	UMass	24–7	11–3	1st	NCAA Division I Round of 32
1993–94	UMass	28–7	14–2	1st	NCAA Division I Round of 32
1994–95	UMass	29–5	13–3	1st	NCAA Division I Elite Eight
1995–96	UMass	35–2*	15–1	1st	NCAA Division I Final Four*
UMass:		189–70 (.730)*	91–41 (.689)		
Memphis Tigers (Conference USA) (2000–2009)
2000–01	Memphis	21–15	10–6	2nd (National)	NIT Third Place
2001–02	Memphis	27–9	12–4	1st (National)	NIT Champion
2002–03	Memphis	23–7	13–3	1st (National)	NCAA Division I Round of 64
2003–04	Memphis	22–8	12–4	T–1st	NCAA Division I Round of 32
2004–05	Memphis	22–16	9–7	T–6th	NIT Semifinal
2005–06	Memphis	33–4	13–1	1st	NCAA Division I Elite Eight
2006–07	Memphis	33–4	16–0	1st	NCAA Division I Elite Eight
2007–08	Memphis	38–2**	16–0**	1st **	NCAA Division I Runner-up**
2008–09	Memphis	33–4	16–0	1st	NCAA Division I Sweet 16
Memphis:		214–68 (.759)**	101–25 (.802)**		
Kentucky Wildcats (Southeastern Conference) (2009–2024)
2009–10	Kentucky	35–3	14–2	1st (East)	NCAA Division I Elite Eight
2010–11	Kentucky	29–9	10–6	2nd (East)	NCAA Division I Final Four
2011–12	Kentucky	38–2	16–0	1st	NCAA Division I Champion
2012–13	Kentucky	21–12	12–6	T–2nd	NIT First Round
2013–14	Kentucky	29–11	12–6	T–2nd	NCAA Division I Runner-up
2014–15	Kentucky	38–1	18–0	1st	NCAA Division I Final Four
2015–16	Kentucky	27–9	13–5	T–1st	NCAA Division I Round of 32
2016–17	Kentucky	32–6	16–2	1st	NCAA Division I Elite Eight
2017–18	Kentucky	26–11	10–8	T–4th	NCAA Division I Sweet 16
2018–19	Kentucky	30–7	15–3	T–2nd	NCAA Division I Elite Eight
2019–20	Kentucky	25–6	15–3	1st	Postseason cancelled due to COVID-19
2020–21	Kentucky	9–16	8–9	8th	
2021–22	Kentucky	26–8	14–4	T–2nd	NCAA Division I Round of 64
2022–23	Kentucky	22–12	12–6	3rd	NCAA Division I Round of 32
2023–24	Kentucky	23–10	13–5	T–2nd	NCAA Division I Round of 64
Kentucky:		410–123 (.769)	198–65 (.753)		
Arkansas Razorbacks (Southeastern Conference) (2024–present)
2024–25	Arkansas	22–14	8–10	T–9th	NCAA Division I Sweet 16
2025–26	Arkansas	28–9	13–5	T–2nd	NCAA Division I Sweet 16
2026–27	Arkansas	4–2	0–0		
Arkansas:		54–25 (.684)	21–15 (.583)		
Total:		867–286 (.752)***			
National champion Postseason invitational champion Conference regular season champion Conference regular season and conference tournament champion Division regular season champion Division regular season and conference tournament champion Conference tournament champion

* ^^{a} ^{b} ^{c} UMass had its 4–1 record in the 1996 NCAA tournament and Final Four standing vacated after Marcus Camby was ruled ineligible due to his contact with a sports agent.

** ^^{a} ^{b} ^{c} ^{d} ^{e} ^{f} The NCAA vacated 38 wins and 1 loss from Memphis's 2007–08 season under Calipari due to violations of NCAA rules.

*** Under current NCAA official records, Calipari's record as of November 20, 2026, is 867–286 (.752), which accounts for the 4 vacated wins (and one vacated loss) in the 1995–96 NCAA Tournament at UMass, and the 38 vacated wins (and 1 vacated losses) at Memphis in the entire 2007–08 season.

Calipari's actual on-the-court record without vacated games is 909–288 (.759)

****The 2020 NCAA tournament was canceled due to concerns over the COVID-19 pandemic.

=== NBA ===
Legend
Regular season	G	Games coached	W	Games won	L	Games lost	W–L %	Win–loss %
Playoffs	PG	Playoff games	PW	Playoff wins	PL	Playoff losses	PW–L %	Playoff win–loss %

Team	Year	G	W	L	W–L%	Finish	PG	PW	PL	PW–L%	Result
New Jersey	1996–97	82	26	56	.317	5th in Atlantic	—	—	—	—	Missed Playoffs
New Jersey	1997–98	82	43	39	.524	3rd in Atlantic	3	0	3	.000	Lost in first round
New Jersey	1998–99	20	3	17	.150	7th in Atlantic	—	—	—	—	Fired
Career		184	72	112	.391		3	0	3	.000	

=== Overall wins ===
On February 26, 2011, after Kentucky beat the Florida Gators in Rupp Arena, Calipari was recognized for his 500th career victory as a Division I men's basketball coach. Over the course of the next few months, the NCAA's Committee on Infractions (COI) and the University of Kentucky exchanged letters debating whether Calipari had indeed reached the 500-win milestone. Due to games vacated by the NCAA in two different seasons (the 1996 season at UMass and the 2008 season at Memphis), the NCAA only officially recognized Calipari's 500th all time coaching victory on March 15, 2012.

== Coaching tree ==
Assistant coaches under Calipari who became NCAA or NBA head coaches

- Bill Bayno – UNLV (1995–2000), Loyola Marymount (2008–2009)
- Bruiser Flint – UMass (1996–2001), Drexel (2001–2016)
- John Robic – Youngstown State (1999–2005)
- Don Casey – New Jersey Nets (1999–2000)
- Johnny Davis – Orlando Magic (2003–2005)
- Derek Kellogg – UMass (2008–2017), LIU (2017–2022)
- Chuck Martin – Marist (2008–2013)
- Josh Pastner – Memphis (2009–2016), Georgia Tech (2016–2023), UNLV (2025–present)
- Orlando Antigua – South Florida (2014–2017)
- Tony Barbee – UTEP (2006–2010), Auburn (2010–2014), Central Michigan (2021–2025)
- Kenny Payne – Louisville (2022–2024)
- Rod Strickland – LIU (2022–present)
- K. T. Turner – UT Arlington (2023–present)
- Ed Schilling – Wright State (1997–2003), Pepperdine (2024–2026)

== Awards and honors ==
Calipari was inducted into the National Italian American Sports Hall of Fame in 2004.

On September 11, 2015, he was inducted into the Naismith Memorial Basketball Hall of Fame. As of the 2024–25 NCAA Division I college basketball season, John Calipari is one of only 6 active coaches enshrined (Rick Pitino, Tom Izzo, Geno Auriemma, Kim Mulkey and Bill Self).

On September 21, 2021, the main basketball court at Clarion University's Tippin Gymnasium was officially renamed the John V. Calipari Court and will be known as "Coach Cal Court."

== Books ==
He has written several books, including Bounce Back: Overcoming Setbacks to Succeed in Business and in Life (2009) and Players First: Coaching from the Inside Out (2014). Additionally, Calipari starred in the 30 for 30 documentary from ESPN "One and Not Done" which details his professional career.

== Personal life ==
Calipari, who has dual citizenship in the U.S. and Italy, has been married to his wife since 1986. They have two daughters and a son. His daughter Erin played basketball at UMass, and his son Brad played basketball at Kentucky and Detroit Mercy. His second cousin is TJ Friedl, a baseball player.

Calipari appeared at Governor Andy Beshear's July 9, 2020, press briefing to publicly state his support of the Kentucky statewide mask mandate due to the COVID-19 pandemic in Kentucky stating: "We in our state have done an unbelievable job," Calipari said. "Let's take it up a notch. This is kind of like what I'm coaching: We're winning, and I'm being even harder. We are winning, let's be stronger." He made it clear that he volunteered to appear and the governor did not request his appearance.

=== Confrontation with John Chaney ===
On February 13, 1994, Temple University basketball coach John Chaney threatened to kill Calipari at a post-game news conference, while Calipari was speaking at a podium. Chaney entered the conference mid-speech, called him an "Italian son of a bitch," accusing Calipari of manipulating the referees. When Calipari attempted to respond to the accusations, Chaney yelled, "Shut up, goddammit!" and proceeded to charge the stage, before being stopped by security. While being held back, Chaney shouted, "When I see you, I'm gonna kick your ass!" As security restrained Chaney, he repeatedly yelled, "I'll kill you!" and angrily admitted telling his players to "knock your fucking kids in the mouth." Chaney received a one-game suspension for the incident. Chaney apologized a few days later and they eventually reconciled and would later become friends, occasionally posing for pictures pretending to fight for fans.

== See also ==
- List of college men's basketball coaches with 600 wins
- List of NCAA Division I Men's Final Four appearances by coach
