= Erin Calipari =

American pharmacologist and researcher

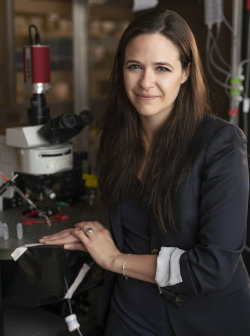
- Born: February 18, 1987 (age 39)
- Education: University of Massachusetts Amherst (BA); Wake Forest University (PhD)
- Scientific career
- Fields: Pharmacology
- Workplaces: Vanderbilt University; Wake Forest University; Icahn School of Medicine at Mount Sinai
- Doctoral advisor: Sara Jones
- Website: Calipari Lab

Erin S. Calipari (born February 18, 1987) is an associate professor of pharmacology at the Vanderbilt University School of Medicine Basic Sciences. Calipari's research focuses on understanding the brain circuitry that is used for adaptive and maladaptive processes in reward, associative learning and motivation.

== Early life and education ==
Calipari was born in Pittsburgh, Pennsylvania, the oldest daughter of basketball coach John Calipari and Ellen Calipari. Calipari took part in athletics while attending White Station High School. She played softball, basketball and hockey. She was part of the first generation in her family to intend to become an academic. Calipari attended University of Massachusetts Amherst, where she studied biology and played basketball for the UMass Minutewomen. Calipari was a graduate student at Wake Forest University, where she earned a doctorate in neuropharmacology under the supervision of Sara Jones. She used analytical chemistry and operant behavior studies to understand how dopamine kinetics are impacted by drug self-administration. Calipari was a postdoctoral research associate in a genetics laboratory at the Icahn School of Medicine at Mount Sinai. She focused on how to understand neural circuit activity and transcriptional programs.

== Research and career ==
Calipari joined Vanderbilt University in 2017 as part of the Vanderbilt Center for Addiction Research. She works on the brain circuitry that is used for adaptive and maladaptive neurological processes including reward, associative learning and motivation, and how these are associated with psychiatric disease. In Tennessee, where Calipari grew up, there are more prescriptions for opioids than there are people living in the state.

Calipari believes that drug addiction is a decision-making disease: people make decisions to choose to invest in drugs over other expenses. She looks at which parts of the brain are involved with making decisions, and how to reprogram them to make other choices. Her lab uses fibre photometry which monitors neural activity via changes in calcium (calcium imaging) and neurotransmitter activity, in subpopulations of neurons using an optical fiber. They also employ other neurophotometric and neurochemical methods such as optogenetics, and fast-scan cyclic voltammetry. She is interested in why women are vulnerable to drug addiction, and how the immune system could be used to fight the opioid epidemic. She believes that through the platform of sport it is possible to communicate the dangers of drug addiction.

While women are more susceptible to drug addiction, the majority of addiction studies are focused on men. This means that medication development has focused on correcting addiction in men, and may explain why women do not respond to treatment in the same way as men. Calipari found that when hormones related to fertility are high, women make stronger associations to clues in their environment and more likely to seek rewards, which makes them more prone to drug addiction and relapse. Her research can be used by treatment centers to educate women about their decision-making mechanisms.

== Selected publications ==
- López, Alberto J.; Siciliano, Cody A.; Calipari, Erin S. (2019). "Activity-Dependent Epigenetic Remodeling in Cocaine Use Disorder". Substance Use Disorders. Handbook of Experimental Pharmacology. Vol. 258. pp. 231–263. doi:10.1007/164_2019_257. ISBN 978-3-030-33678-3. PMID 31628597. S2CID 204788055.
- Brady, Lillian J.; Hofford, Rebecca S.; Tat, Jennifer; Calipari, Erin S.; Kiraly, Drew D. (2019). "Granulocyte-Colony Stimulating Factor Alters the Pharmacodynamic Properties of Cocaine in Female Mice". ACS Chemical Neuroscience. 10 (10): 4213–4220. doi:10.1021/acschemneuro.9b00309. PMC 7328281. PMID 31479229.
- Fakira, Amanda K.; Peck, Emily G.; Liu, Yutong; Lueptow, Lindsay M.; Trimbake, Nikita A.; Han, Ming-Hu; Calipari, Erin S.; Devi, Lakshmi A. (2019). "The role of the neuropeptide PEN receptor, GPR83, in the reward pathway: Relationship to sex-differences". Neuropharmacology. 157 107666. doi:10.1016/j.neuropharm.2019.107666. PMC 6677605. PMID 31199956.
- Zhang, Hongxing; Chaudhury, Dipesh; Nectow, Alexander R.; Friedman, Allyson K.; Zhang, Song; Juarez, Barbara; Liu, He; Pfau, Madeline L.; Aleyasin, Hossein; Jiang, Cheng; Crumiller, Marshall; Calipari, Erin S.; Ku, Stacy M.; Morel, Carole; Tzavaras, Nikos; Montgomery, Sarah E.; He, Michelle; Salton, Stephen R.; Russo, Scott J.; Nestler, Eric J.; Friedman, Jeffrey M.; Cao, Jun-Li; Han, Ming-Hu (2019). "α1- and β3-Adrenergic Receptor–Mediated Mesolimbic Homeostatic Plasticity Confers Resilience to Social Stress in Susceptible Mice". Biological Psychiatry. 85 (3): 226–236. doi:10.1016/j.biopsych.2018.08.020. PMC 6800029. PMID 30336931.
