= St. Charles West High School =

Public school in Missouri, United States

Coordinates: 38.8014°N 90.5328°W

- 3601 Droste Rd. St. Charles, MO 63303

Information
- Type: Comprehensive public high school
- School district: City of St. Charles School District
- Principal: Scott Voelkl
- Staff: 63.30 (FTE)
- Grades: 9–12
- Enrollment: 633 (2023–2024)
- Student to teacher ratio: 10.00
- Color
- Mascot: Warrior
- Website: School home page

St. Charles West High School is a public high school in St. Charles, Missouri that is part of the City of St. Charles School District.

== Activities ==
For the 2011–2012 school year, the school offered 21 activities approved by the Missouri State High School Activities Association (MSHSAA): baseball, boys and girls basketball, cheerleading, boys and girls cross country, dance team, football, boys golf, music activities, boys and girls soccer, softball, speech and debate, girls swimming and diving, boys tennis, boys and girls track and field, girls volleyball, winter guard, and wrestling.

== Notable alumni ==
- Wendy Dillinger — women's soccer coach at University of Missouri - St. Louis
- Tim Hawkins — comedian and entertainer
- Ryan Robertson — former NBA player
