= Dribble drive motion =

Offensive basketball strategy

The dribble drive motion is an offensive strategy in basketball, developed by former Pepperdine head coach Vance Walberg during his time as a California high school coach and at Fresno City College.

The offense was popularized at the major college level by John Calipari while at The University of Memphis, and was sometimes called the "Memphis Attack". Originally called 'AASAA' by Walberg (for "Attack, Attack, Skip, Attack, Attack"), the offense is also sometimes known as the 'Walberg offense' or abbreviated to DDM, and has been described as "Princeton on steroids".

The offense focuses on spreading the offensive players in the half court, so that helping on dribble penetration or skips becomes difficult for the defense, because the help will leave an offensive player open without any defenders near him. As an example a guard can drive through the defensive gaps for a layup or dunk, or pass out to the perimeter if the defense collapses onto him.

== Basic principles ==
Like the Princeton offense, the Dribble Drive offense is a "four-out" offense - that is, only one post player (generally the center) plays near the basket, while the other four players play on the perimeter, around the three-point line. Unlike the Princeton offense, which is based on players cutting towards the basket, and other motion offenses which rely on players screening for each other, the Dribble Drive uses a player (usually, but not limited to, the point guard) to dribble-drive towards the basket. The offense is designed in a way that makes it difficult for the defense to help on dribble-penetration without giving up either a layup or an open three-pointer. Depending on how the defense responds, the driving player can either shoot a lay-up, pass to the post player for a shot, or "kick-out" pass to one of the perimeter players. If the ball is returned to the perimeter, the player that receives the pass either takes a three-point shot, or dribble-drives to the basket, restarting the process.

Like most motion-type offenses the Dribble Drive is predicated on reading the defense rather than set plays, as it relies on the speed and decision making of its players. "I feel we're teaching kids how to play basketball instead of how to run plays" says Walberg of the offense. Coaches that rely upon the offense have said that they do most of their coaching work in practices rather than games. However, the offense contains a lot of initial entry sets, which are used as starting-out points. The sets serve as a way to get the defense different looks, a way to feature a certain player, or exploit a defensive weakness.

== History ==
In 1997 Vance Walberg developed the offense, which he named the AASAA, meaning "Attack-Attack-Skip-Attack-Attack", while coaching at Clovis West High School in Fresno, California. Walberg adopted the offense to take advantage of the skills of his point guard Chris Hernandez, later the starting point guard at Stanford. After several years of tweaking the system, he took it with him to Fresno City College, where he coached from 2002–2006.

While at dinner with Memphis coach John Calipari in October, 2003, he described the basic principles of the offense. John Calipari would implement the offense for the 2005–2006 season at Memphis, for which it is sometimes known as the "Memphis Attack" offense. After he implemented the offense, Calipari took the Memphis Tigers to great success. His teams made 3 consecutive Elite Eight appearances in the NCAA Tournament, and made it to the NCAA Men's Basketball Championship Game in 2008. That same season, Calipari's Tigers set an NCAA single-season record for most victories, with 38, though this season would later be expunged from the record books per imposed sanctions on Memphis.

In 2012 Calipari's Kentucky Wildcats won the NCAA Championship utilizing the Dribble Drive offense.

By the 2007–2008 basketball season, at least 224 junior high, high school, college, and professional teams were using some form of the Dribble drive motion.

During the 2012-2013 NBA Season the Denver Nuggets led by coach George Karl implemented a version of the dribble drive offense behind point guards Ty Lawson and Andre Miller, leading them to the highest ranked offense in the NBA by points scored, and the 3rd Seed in the Western Conference, while winning a franchise best 57 games.

Filipino coach Chot Reyes has used the dribble-drive motion offense for his Talk 'N Text Tropang Texters team of the Philippine Basketball Association (PBA), which has resulted in his team winning four PBA championships. In his Philippines men's national basketball team stint, Reyes also used the dribble-drive offense, also proving to be effective in the international level, where the Philippines placed second in the 2013 FIBA Asia Championship and qualified for the 2014 FIBA Basketball World Cup.
