= Clarion Golden Eagles men's basketball =

2022–23 Clarion Golden Eagles men's basketball team
- University: Pennsylvania Western University Clarion
- Head coach: Marcess Williams (5th season)
- Location: Clarion, Pennsylvania
- Arena: Waldo S. Tippin Gymnasium (1968-2017, 2019 - present); Clarion University Rec Center (2018)
- Conference: PSAC
- Nickname: Golden Eagles
- Colors: Blue and gold
- All-time record: 942–765 (.552)

NCAA Division I tournament second round
- 1981

NCAA Division I tournament appearances
- 1981, 2001

Conference tournament champions
- 2001

Conference regular-season champions
- 1977, 1979, 1984

The Clarion Golden Eagles men's basketball team is a Division II basketball program that represents Pennsylvania Western University Clarion (known before July 2022 as Clarion University of Pennsylvania). The program has been in the NCAA Division II Tournament two times in its history in 1981 and 2001. They are currently coached by Marcess Williams.

== Current coaching staff ==
Name	Position	Alma mater	Tenure
Damian Pitts	Head Coach	Goucher College	2019–present
Mike McCready	Assistant Coach	Kutztown University of Pennsylvania	2019–present

== Current roster ==
2018–19 Clarion Golden Eagles men's basketball team
Players
Coaches

Pos.	#	Name	Height	Weight	Year	Previous school	Hometown
G	0	Khari Williams	6 ft 4 in (1.93 m)	185 lb (84 kg)	So	Archbishop John Carroll HS	Norristown, PA
F	1	Sheriff Conteh	6 ft 4 in (1.93 m)	185 lb (84 kg)	Fr	Our Saviour Lutheran Prep	Bronx, NY
G	3	Ejiah Cottrill	6 ft 2 in (1.88 m)	185 lb (84 kg)	Jr	Polk State College	Beaver Falls, PA
F	5	Lawerence Lemon	6 ft 7 in (2.01 m)	200 lb (91 kg)	Fr	South Suburban College	Lansing, IL
G	11	Brandon Williams	6 ft 2 in (1.88 m)	190 lb (86 kg)	RS Sr	Borough of Manhattan CC	New Rochelle, NY
G	13	Javontay Pipkin	5 ft 9 in (1.75 m)	160 lb (73 kg)	Jr	Lackawanna College	Staten Island, NY
G	14	RJ Laugand	5 ft 11 in (1.8 m)	175 lb (79 kg)	Sr	Clarion-Limestone HS	Clarion, PA
F/C	20	James Price	6 ft 7 in (2.01 m)	210 lb (95 kg)	Fr	Archbishop Curley HS	Joppa, MD
G	22	Kass Taylor	6 ft 4 in (1.93 m)	165 lb (75 kg)	RS Fr	California HS	California, PA
F	23	Jake Anderson	6 ft 5 in (1.96 m)	215 lb (98 kg)	RS Jr	Butler County CC	Butler, PA
G	25	Stevan Rodriguez	6 ft 5 in (1.96 m)	225 lb (102 kg)	Jr	Lackawanna College	Reading, PA
F	33	Jonathan Williams	6 ft 8 in (2.03 m)	245 lb (111 kg)	Jr	Lackawanna College	Scranton, PA
G	34	Mason Mraz	6 ft 3 in (1.91 m)	195 lb (88 kg)	So	Laurel HS	New Castle, PA
G		Jarrod Stukes	5 ft 8 in (1.73 m)	160 lb (73 kg)	Fr	La Salle	Philadelphia, PA

Head coach

- Marcess Williams (La Roche)

Assistant coach(es)

- Al Modrzejewski (Alliance)
- Chad Rea (Slippery Rock)

Legend

- (C) Team captain
- (S) Suspended
- (I) Ineligible
- (W) Walk-on
- Injured
- Current redshirt

Roster
Last update: 4 December 2018

== School records ==
=== Career leaders ===
- Points Scored: Kwame Morton (2,543)
- Rebounds: Terry Roseto (1,275)
- Assists: Oronn Brown (631)
- Steals: Oronn Brown (361)
- Games Played: Dan Chojnacki (118)
- Games Started: Terrance Vaughns (108)
- Blocked Shots: Marvin Wells (98)

=== Single-season leaders ===
- Points Scored: Kwame Morton (845, 1994)
- Rebounds: Reggie Wells, (367, 1977)
- Assists: Oronn Brown (173, 1996)
- Steals: Oronn Brown (120, 1997)
- Blocked Shots: Ian Whyte (48, 1994)

=== Single-game leaders ===
- Points Scored: Kwame Morton (56, vs Slippery Rock 1994)
- Rebounds: Quintus Teer (23, vs UDC 2011)
- Assists: Dave Wojciechowski/R.C. Kehoe (14, vs Lake Erie/Roberts Wesleyan 1993/1998)
- Steals: Ted Boyer (12, vs Mercyhurst 1989)
- Blocked Shots: Ian Whyte (10, vs Saint Vincent 1993)

== Season by season record ==
Statistics overview
Season	Team	Overall	Conference	Standing	Postseason
Ron Galbreath (PSAC) (1970–1974)
1970-71	Clarion	16-9	7-1	2nd (1st PSAC West)	NAIA District 18 Semifinals
1971-72	Clarion	18-7	6-2	5th (2nd PSAC West)	NAIA District 18 Runner-Up
1972-73	Clarion	19-6	8-2	2nd (1st PSAC West)	NAIA District 18 Semifinals
1973-74	Clarion	18-8	6-4	6th (3rd PSAC West)	NAIA District 18 Semifinals
1974-75	Clarion	12-12	4-6	11th (4th PSAC West)	-
Ron Galbreath:		83-42	31-15		
Joe DeGregorio (PSAC) (1975–1982)
1975-76	Clarion	18-9	7-3	4th (3rd PSAC West)	NAIA District 18 Semifinals
1976-77	Clarion	27-3	9-1	1st (1st PSAC West)	NAIA National 2nd Round
1977-78	Clarion	18-11	8-2	3rd (2nd PSAC West)	NAIA District 18 Semifinals
1978-79	Clarion	22-6	9-1	1st (1st PSAC West)	NAIA District 18 Quarterfinals
1979-80	Clarion	23-9	8-2	2nd (1st PSAC West)	NAIA National Quarterfinals
1980-81	Clarion	23-6	8-2	2nd (2nd PSAC West)	NCAA Second Round
1981-82	Clarion	16-11	5-5	7th (4th PSAC West)	-
1982-83	Clarion	15-11	7-3	4th (1st PSAC West)	-
Joe DeGregorio:		158-71	62-19		
Dick Taylor (PSAC) (1983–1988)
1983-84	Clarion	15-11	8-2	1st (1st PSAC West)	-
1984-85	Clarion	14-13	8-2	2nd (1st PSAC West)	-
1985-86	Clarion	10-17	5-5	5th (3rd PSAC West)	-
1986-87	Clarion	8-17	1-9	12th (6th PSAC West)	-
1987-88	Clarion	11-15	2-10	12th (7th PSAC West)	-
1988-89	Clarion	13-13	4-8	11th (6th PSAC West)	-
Dick Taylor:		71-86	28-36		
Ron Righter (PSAC) (1989–2014)
1989-90	Clarion	13-13	2-10	13th (7th PSAC West)	-
1990-91	Clarion	16-10	5-7	10th (5th PSAC West)	-
1991-92	Clarion	18-9	5-7	8th (4th PSAC West)	-
1992-93	Clarion	17-9	5-7	8th (4th PSAC West)	-
1993-94	Clarion	11-15	4-8	10th (5th PSAC West)	-
1994-95	Clarion	11-15	4-8	10th (5th PSAC West)	-
1995-96	Clarion	12-13	4-8	11th (5th PSAC West)	-
1996-97	Clarion	22-7	9-3	2nd (1st PSAC West)	-
1997-98	Clarion	20-7	8-4	4th (3rd PSAC West)	-
1998-99	Clarion	19-8	7-5	5th (3rd PSAC West)	-
1999-00	Clarion	20-7	10-2	2nd (1st PSAC West)	-
2000-01	Clarion	19-10	7-5	5th (3rd PSAC West)	NCAA First Round
2001-02	Clarion	15-11	7-5	6th (4th PSAC West)	-
2002-03	Clarion	19-10	7-5	6th (3rd PSAC West)	-
2003-04	Clarion	16-12	6-6	8th (4th PSAC West)	-
2004-05	Clarion	19-9	8-4	2nd (1st PSAC West)	-
2005-06	Clarion	13-13	5-7	10th (5th PSAC West)	-
2006-07	Clarion	13-15	6-6	8th (4th PSAC West)	-
2007-08	Clarion	16-12	7-5	6th (3rd PSAC West)	-
2008-09	Clarion	11-16	2-12	15th (8th PSAC West)	-
2009-10	Clarion	18-11	9-5	4th (2nd PSAC West)	-
2010-11	Clarion	15-11	5-9	10th (6th PSAC West)	-
2011-12	Clarion	15-13	11-11	9th (7th PSAC West)	-
2012-13	Clarion	6-20	4-18	14th (7th PSAC West)	-
2013-14	Clarion	5-20	3-13	16th (9th PSAC West)	-
Ron Righter:		402-299			
Marcess Williams (PSAC) (2014–2019)
2014-15	Clarion	10-16	7-15	16th (8th PSAC West)	-
2015-16	Clarion	14-16	10-12	12th (7th PSAC West)	-
2016-17	Clarion	7-21	4-18	17th (9th PSAC West)	-
2017-18	Clarion	3-25	0-22	18th (9th PSAC West)	-
2018-19	Clarion	6-20	4-17	15th (9th PSAC West)	-
Marcess Williams:		40-98	25-84		
Damian Pitts (PSAC) (2019–present)
2019-20	Clarion	5-23	4-18	16th (7th PSAC West)	-
2021-22	Clarion	9-18	5-17	15th (8th PSAC West)	-
2022-23	Clarion	3-24	1-21	18th (9th PSAC West)	-
2023-24	Clarion	8-20	6-16	12th (7th PSAC West)	-
2024-25	Clarion	12-14	7-13	12th (7th PSAC West)	-
2025-26	Clarion	12-16	7-13	12th (7th PSAC West)	-
Total:					
National champion Postseason invitational champion Conference regular season champion Conference regular season and conference tournament champion Division regular season champion Division regular season and conference tournament champion Conference tournament champion

== Championships and tournament runs ==
=== PSAC championships ===
- PSAC Championships (1): 2001
- PSAC Tournament Appearances (23): 1971, 1973, 1977, 1979–86, 1997-05, 2007–08, 2010
- PSAC West Championships (11): 1971, 1973, 1977, 1979–80, 1983–85, 1997, 2000, 2005

=== NCAA tournament ===
The Golden Eagles have appeared in the NCAA tournament 2 times. Their combined record is 1-2.

Year	Round	Opponent	Result
1981	First Round; Second Round	Monmouth; Cal Poly	W 80-78; L 84-61
2001	First Round	Salem International	L 77-72

=== NAIA tournament ===
The Golden Eagles have appeared in the NAIA Tournament 3 times. Their combined record is 3-3. Source

- District 30 Tournament Appearances (2): 1952, 1953
- District 18 Tournament Appearances (10): 1966, 1971–74, 1976–80
- National Tournament Appearances (3):1953, 1977, 1980

Year	Round	Opponent	Result
1952	First Round	Utah State	L 85-68
1977	First Round; Second Round	Augsburg; Grand Valley State	W 88-84; L 79-65
1980	First Round; Second Round; Elite Eight	Grand Canyon; Loras; Huron	W 83-75; W 79-71; L 61-52
