= Vance Walberg =

American basketball coach (born 1956)

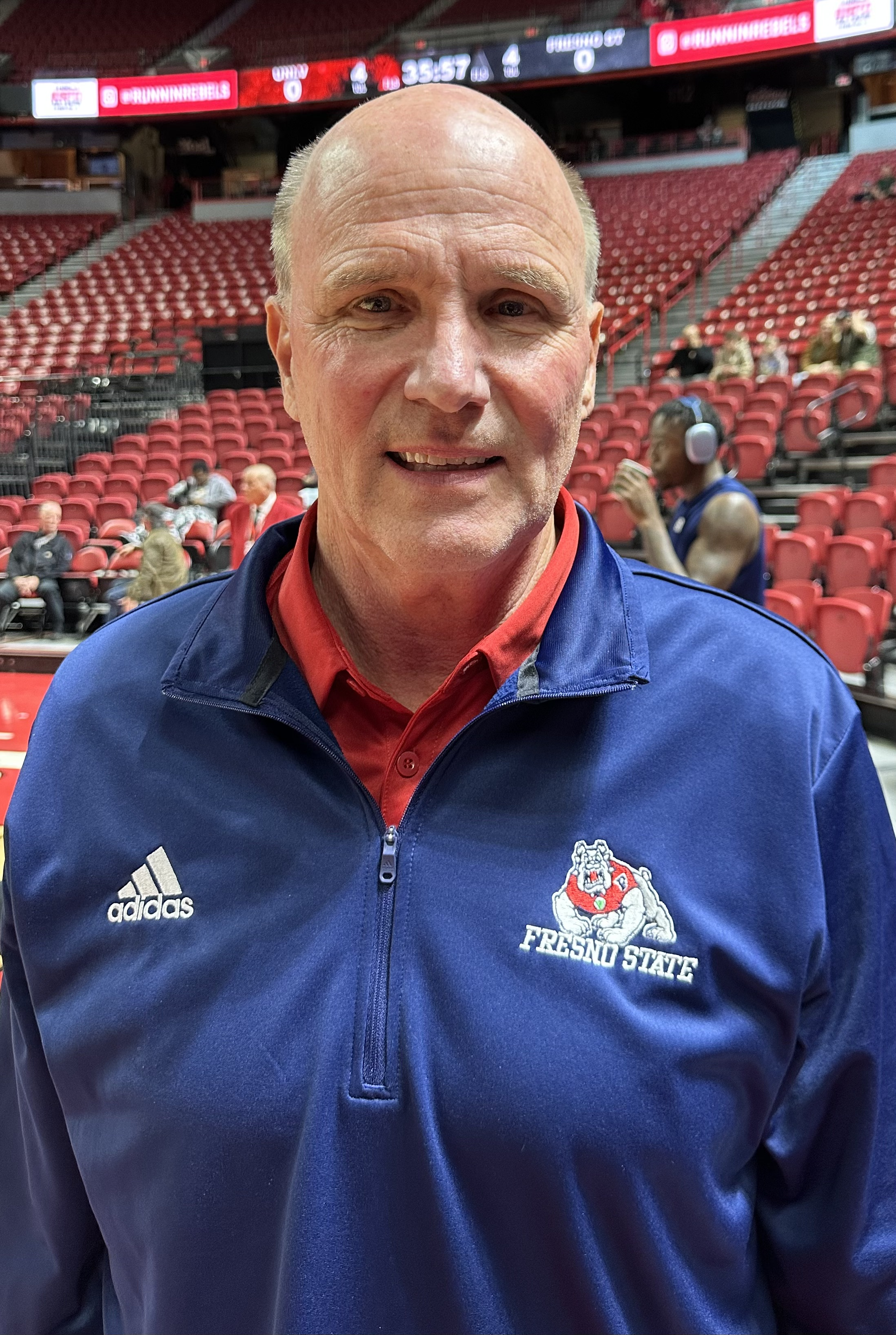
- Walberg in 2024

Fresno State Bulldogs
- Position: Head coach
- League: Pac-12

Personal information
- Born: July 9, 1956 (age 70)

Career information
- High school: Monta Vista (Cupertino, California)
- College: De Anza (1974–1976); Cal State Bakersfield (1976–1978)

Career history

Coaching
- 1978–1981: Mountain View HS
- 1981–1983: Los Altos HS
- 1984–1989: Newark Memorial HS
- 1989–2002: Clovis West HS
- 2002–2006: Fresno CC
- 2006–2008: Pepperdine
- 2008–2011: UMass (assistant)
- 2012–2013: Denver Nuggets (assistant)
- 2013–2015: Philadelphia 76ers (assistant)
- 2015–2016: Sacramento Kings (assistant)
- 2016–2024: Clovis West HS
- 2024–present: Fresno State

Vance Patrick Walberg (born July 9, 1956) is an American college basketball coach who is the head coach at California State University, Fresno (Fresno State), a position he has held since 2024. He was previously an assistant coach for the Sacramento Kings of the National Basketball Association (NBA), the head men's basketball coach at Pepperdine University, and an assistant coach at the University of Massachusetts. He is known for developing the dribble drive motion offense, sometimes known as the Memphis Attack, AASAA offense.

== Early life ==
Walberg graduated from Monta Vista High in Cupertino, California in 1974, where he was the team's Most Valuable Player in winning a league championship. He spent two seasons at De Anza Community College, where he won two conference championships and finished as the school's all-time steals leader. He then went to Cal State Bakersfield for the next two years, and was named the school's Defensive Player of the Year twice and served as team captain.

== Coaching career ==
Walberg became head coach of Mountain View (Calif.) High at age 22. He also served as badminton coach at James Logan High School (1983–84) and head basketball coach at Los Altos High School (1981–83). Walberg then became the head coach at Newark (Calif.) Memorial High School for five seasons (1985–89), winning one league title on two trips to the championships. In 1990, he embarked on a 13-year tenure as head coach at Clovis West High School in Fresno, Calif. In 1997, he had his Clovis West High team adopt his AASAA offense, leading to a 159–18 five-year record.

Walberg's stint at Fresno City College (2002–06) had his team going 133–11 on more than 100 points a game, leading to a 2005 California state community college title. He was named California Community College Coach of the Year twice (2003 and 2005) and was Central Valley Conference Coach in every season he coached there.

He became the Pepperdine head coach in April 2006. On January 17, 2008, Walberg resigned from Pepperdine, citing family issues. Walberg would later reveal that health issues and the death of his mother were major contributing factors to his resignation at Pepperdine.

On May 5, 2008, he officially joined head coach Derek Kellogg's staff at UMass. He served on the UMass staff for three seasons.

Walberg spent time with the Denver Nuggets in the 2011–2012 season. In October 2012, George Karl announced that Walberg officially joined the Nuggets' staff as an assistant coach.

On February 23, 2015, it was announced that Walberg would reunite with George Karl on the Sacramento Kings' coaching staff as an assistant coach. On February 17, 2016, he was fired by the Kings.

On July 20, 2016, Walberg returned to Clovis West High School as varsity boys' basketball head coach.

On April 6, 2024, multiple news outlets reported that Walberg has been hired as the new men's basketball coach at Fresno State, becoming the 20th head coach in program history.

== Personal life ==
Walberg has a physical education degree from Cal-State Bakersfield in 1978, a teaching credential from the College of Belmont in 1979 and a master's degree in health, physical education and recreation from Saint Mary's College in 1986. He and his wife, Rose, have four children.

== Head coaching record ==
Record table
Season	Team	Overall	Conference	Standing	Postseason
Pepperdine Waves (West Coast Conference) (2006–2008)
2006–07	Pepperdine	8–23	4–10	8th	
2007–08	Pepperdine	6–12	0–2	(Resigned)	
Pepperdine:		14–35 (.286)	4–12 (.250)		
Fresno State Bulldogs (Mountain West Conference) (2024–2026)
2024–25	Fresno State	6–26	2–18	10th	
2025–26	Fresno State	13–19	7–13	10th	
Fresno State Bulldogs (Pac-12 Conference) (2026–present)
2026–27	Fresno State	0–0	0–0	TBD	
Fresno State:		19–45 (.297)	9–31 (.225)		
Total:		33–80 (.292)			
