= Ole Miss Rebels men's basketball statistical leaders =

The Ole Miss Rebels men's basketball statistical leaders are individual statistical leaders of the Ole Miss Rebels men's basketball program in various categories, including points, three-pointers, assists, blocks, rebounds, and steals. Within those areas, the lists identify single-game, single-season, and career leaders. The Rebels represent the University of Mississippi in the NCAA's Southeastern Conference.

Ole Miss began competing in intercollegiate basketball in 1908. However, the school's record book does not generally list records from before the 1950s, as records from before this period are often incomplete and inconsistent. Since scoring was much lower in this era, and teams played much fewer games during a typical season, it is likely that few or no players from this era would appear on these lists anyway.

The NCAA did not officially record assists as a stat until the 1983–84 season, and blocks and steals until the 1985–86 season, but Ole Miss's record books includes players in these stats before these seasons. These lists are updated through the end of the 2020–21 season.

== Scoring ==
Career
| Rk | Player | Points | Seasons |
|---|---|---|---|
| 1 | John Stroud | 2,328 | 1976–77 1977–78 1978–79 1979–80 |
| 2 | Joe Harvell | 2,078 | 1989–90 1990–91 1991–92 1992–93 |
| 3 | Chris Warren | 2,021 | 2007–08 2008–09 2009–10 2010–11 |
| 4 | Carlos Clark | 1,822 | 1979–80 1980–81 1981–82 1982–83 |
| 5 | Elston Turner | 1,805 | 1977–78 1978–79 1979–80 1980–81 |
| 6 | Breein Tyree | 1,797 | 2016–17 2017–18 2018–19 2019–20 |
| 7 | Matthew Murrell | 1,788 | 2020–21 2021–22 2022–23 2023–24 2024–25 |
| 8 | Justin Reed | 1,785 | 2000–01 2001–02 2002–03 2003–04 |
| 9 | Keith Carter | 1,682 | 1995–96 1996–97 1997–98 1998–99 |
| 10 | Jarvis Summers | 1,629 | 2011–12 2012–13 2013–14 2014–15 |

Season
| Rk | Player | Points | Season |
|---|---|---|---|
| 1 | Johnny Neumann | 923 | 1970–71 |
| 2 | Gerald Glass | 841 | 1988–89 |
| 3 | John Stroud | 755 | 1979–80 |
| 4 | Stefan Moody | 731 | 2015–16 |
| 5 | Gerald Glass | 723 | 1989–90 |
| 6 | Marshall Henderson | 722 | 2012–13 |
| 7 | John Stroud | 709 | 1978–79 |
| 8 | Joe Harvell | 699 | 1991–92 |
| 9 | Chris Warren | 649 | 2010–11 |
| 10 | Carlos Clark | 634 | 1981–82 |

Single game
| Rk | Player | Points | Season | Opponent |
|---|---|---|---|---|
| 1 | Johnny Neumann | 63 | 1970–71 | LSU |
| 2 | Johnny Neumann | 60 | 1970–71 | Baylor |
| 3 | Johnny Neumann | 57 | 1970–71 | USM |
| 4 | Gerald Glass | 53 | 1988–89 | LSU |
| | Johnny Neumann | 53 | 1970–71 | Vanderbilt |
| 6 | Johnny Neumann | 51 | 1970–71 | Ark. A&M |
| 7 | Don Kessinger | 49 | 1962–63 | Tulane |
| 8 | Don Kessinger | 48 | 1962–63 | Tennessee |
| 9 | Johnny Neumann | 47 | 1970–71 | Kentucky |
| 10 | Johnny Neumann | 46 | 1970–71 | Vanderbilt |
| | Johnny Neumann | 46 | 1970–71 | Kentucky |
| | Joe Gibbon | 46 | 1956–57 | LSU |

== Rebounds ==
Career
| Rk | Player | Rebounds | Seasons |
|---|---|---|---|
| 1 | Murphy Holloway | 1,093 | 2008–09 2009–10 2011–12 2012–13 |
| 2 | Sebastian Saiz | 1,008 | 2013–14 2014–15 2015–16 2016–17 |
| 3 | Walter Actwood | 945 | 1973–74 1974–75 1975–76 1976–77 |
| 4 | Reginald Buckner | 880 | 2009–10 2010–11 2011–12 2012–13 |
| 5 | Elston Turner | 828 | 1977–78 1978–79 1979–80 1980–81 |
| 6 | Joe Gibbon | 827 | 1953–54 1954–55 1955–56 1956–57 |
| 7 | John Stroud | 826 | 1976–77 1977–78 1978–79 1979–80 |
| 8 | Rahim Lockhart | 780 | 1997–98 1998–99 1999–00 2000–01 |
| 9 | Dwayne Curtis | 774 | 2005–06 2006–07 2007–08 |
| 10 | Justin Reed | 766 | 2000–01 2001–02 2002–03 2003–04 |

Season
| Rk | Player | Rebounds | Season |
|---|---|---|---|
| 1 | Sebastian Saiz | 409 | 2016–17 |
| 2 | Murphy Holloway | 350 | 2012–13 |
| 3 | Dwayne Curtis | 337 | 2007–08 |
| 4 | Denver Brackeen | 306 | 1954–55 |
| 5 | Joe Gibbon | 296 | 1956–57 |
| 6 | Walter Actwood | 295 | 1974–75 |
| 7 | Rahim Lockhart | 282 | 2000–01 |
| 8 | Murphy Holloway | 279 | 2011–12 |
| 9 | Rahim Lockhart | 278 | 1999–00 |
| 10 | Reginald Buckner | 271 | 2012–13 |

Single game
| Rk | Player | Rebounds | Season | Opponent |
|---|---|---|---|---|
| 1 | Ivan Richmann | 25 | 1957–58 | Tulane |
| 2 | Joe Gibbon | 24 | 1956–57 | Georgia |
| 3 | Sterling Ainsworth | 23 | 1960–61 | Ark. St. |
| 4 | Walter Actwood | 22 | 1975–76 | ISU-Evansville |
| | Denver Brackeen | 22 | 1954–55 | LSU |
| | Denver Brackeen | 22 | 1954–55 | Vanderbilt |
| 7 | Jerry Brawner | 21 | 1966–67 | Texas |
| | Ivan Richmann | 21 | 1959–60 | Chattanooga |
| | James Miller | 21 | 1955–56 | Miss. St. |
| 10 | Murphy Holloway | 20 | 2009–10 | Auburn |
| | Walter Actwood | 20 | 1974–75 | LSU |
| | Jimmie Graves | 20 | 1956–57 | LSU |
| | Joe Gibbon | 20 | 1956–57 | Kentucky |

== Assists ==
Career
| Rk | Player | Assists | Seasons |
|---|---|---|---|
| 1 | Sean Tuohy | 830 | 1978–79 1979–80 1980–81 1981–82 |
| 2 | Jarvis Summers | 530 | 2011–12 2012–13 2013–14 2014–15 |
| 3 | Rod Barnes | 456 | 1984–85 1985–86 1986–87 1987–88 |
| 4 | Chris Warren | 452 | 2007–08 2008–09 2009–10 2010–11 |
| 5 | Todd Abernethy | 431 | 2003–04 2004–05 2005–06 2006–07 |
| 6 | Jason Harrison | 427 | 1998–99 1999–00 2000–01 2001–02 |
| 7 | Henry Jackson | 378 | 1975–76 1976–77 1977–78 1978–79 |
| 8 | Michael White | 370 | 1995–96 1996–97 1997–98 1998–99 |
| 9 | Bob Mahoney | 362 | 1972–73 1973–74 1974–75 |
| 10 | Devontae Shuler | 329 | 2017–18 2018–19 2019–20 2020–21 |

Season
| Rk | Player | Assists | Season |
|---|---|---|---|
| 1 | Sean Tuohy | 260 | 1979–80 |
| 2 | Sean Tuohy | 215 | 1981–82 |
| 3 | Sean Tuohy | 187 | 1980–81 |
| 4 | Todd Abernethy | 182 | 2006–07 |
| 5 | Rod Barnes | 175 | 1986–87 |
| 6 | Sean Tuohy | 168 | 1978–79 |
| 7 | Jarvis Summers | 160 | 2014–15 |
| 8 | Chris Warren | 156 | 2007–08 |
| 9 | Rod Barnes | 153 | 1985–86 |
| 10 | Bob Mahoney | 147 | 1974–75 |

Single game
| Rk | Player | Assists | Season | Opponent |
|---|---|---|---|---|
| 1 | Sean Tuohy | 15 | 1979–80 | Auburn |
| 2 | Sean Tuohy | 14 | 1979–80 | Miss. St. |
| 3 | Sean Tuohy | 13 | 1981–82 | Virginia Tech |
| | Rod Barnes | 13 | 1985–86 | Florida |
| 5 | Jarvis Summers | 12 | 2011–12 | Illinois St. |
| | Sean Tuohy | 12 | 1979–80 | LSU |
| | Sean Tuohy | 12 | 1979–80 | Kentucky |
| | Sean Tuohy | 12 | 1978–79 | Auburn |
| | Sean Tuohy | 12 | 1980–81 | Dayton |
| 10 | Jaylen Murray | 11 | 2023–24 | Mississippi State |
| | Todd Abernethy | 11 | 2006–07 | LSU |
| | Edmond Fitzgerald | 11 | 1992–93 | Oral Roberts |
| | Rod Barnes | 11 | 1986–87 | Vanderbilt |
| | Rod Barnes | 11 | 1986–87 | Miss. College |
| | Sean Tuohy | 11 | 1979–80 | Alabama |
| | Sean Tuohy | 11 | 1979–80 | Tennessee |
| | Sean Tuohy | 11 | 1979–80 | Mercer |
| | Sean Tuohy | 11 | 1978–79 | Alabama |
| | Bob Mahoney | 11 | 1974–75 | Georgia |
| | Bob Mahoney | 11 | 1974–75 | Auburn |

== Steals ==
Career
| Rk | Player | Steals | Seasons |
|---|---|---|---|
| 1 | Jason Smith | 211 | 1995–96 1996–97 1997–98 1998–99 |
| 2 | Murphy Holloway | 194 | 2008–09 2009–10 2011–12 2012–13 |
| 3 | Devontae Shuler | 182 | 2017–18 2018–19 2019–20 2020–21 |
| 4 | Eric Laird | 179 | 1981–82 1982–83 1983–84 1984–85 |
| | Matthew Murrell | 179 | 2020–21 2021–22 2022–23 2023–24 2024–25 |
| 6 | Jason Harrison | 172 | 1998–99 1999–00 2000–01 2001–02 |
| 7 | Gerald Glass | 159 | 1988–89 1989–90 |
| 8 | Joe Ayers | 157 | 1983–84 1984–85 1985–86 1986–87 |
| 9 | Elston Turner | 155 | 1977–78 1978–79 1979–80 1980–81 |
| 10 | Rod Barnes | 154 | 1984–85 1985–86 1986–87 1987–88 |

Season
| Rk | Player | Steals | Season |
|---|---|---|---|
| 1 | Gerald Glass | 89 | 1988–89 |
| 2 | Myles Burns | 80 | 2022–23 |
| 3 | Jason Smith | 73 | 1998–99 |
| 4 | Gerald Glass | 70 | 1989–90 |
| 5 | Sean Pedulla | 68 | 2024–25 |
| 6 | Murphy Holloway | 58 | 2012–13 |
| | Rod Barnes | 58 | 1987–88 |
| | Matthew Murrell | 58 | 2024–25 |
| 9 | Stefan Moody | 57 | 2014–15 |
| 10 | Devontae Shuler | 56 | 2018–19 |

Single game
| Rk | Player | Steals | Season | Opponent |
|---|---|---|---|---|
| 1 | Matthew Murrell | 10 | 2023–24 | Troy |
| 2 | Gerald Glass | 8 | 1988–89 | Christian Bros. |
| | Eric Laird | 8 | 1982–83 | DePaul |
| 4 | Kezza Giffa | 7 | 2025–26 | St. John's |
| | Matthew Murrell | 7 | 2024–25 | Grambling |
| | Myles Burns | 7 | 2022–23 | Mississippi State |
| | Terence Davis | 7 | 2018–19 | Texas A&M |
| | Rasheed Brooks | 7 | 2016–17 | LSU |
| | Justin Reed | 7 | 2000–01 | Auburn |
| | Jason Smith | 7 | 1997–98 | Florida |
| | Coolidge Ball | 7 | 1973–74 | Alabama |

== Blocks ==
Career
| Rk | Player | Blocks | Seasons |
|---|---|---|---|
| 1 | Reginald Buckner | 326 | 2009–10 2010–11 2011–12 2012–13 |
| 2 | Sean Murphy | 180 | 1987–88 1988–89 1989–90 1990–91 |
| 3 | Aaron Jones | 139 | 2011–12 2012–13 2013–14 2014–15 |
| 4 | Rahim Lockhart | 132 | 1997–98 1998–99 1999–00 2000–01 |
| 5 | Sebastian Saiz | 129 | 2013–14 2014–15 2015–16 2016–17 |
| 6 | Johnnie Rogers | 114 | 1996–97 1997–98 1998–99 |
| 7 | Terrance Henry | 113 | 2008–09 2009–10 2010–11 2011–12 |
| 8 | David Dean | 108 | 1992–93 1993–94 |
| 9 | Ansu Sesay | 99 | 1994–95 1995–96 1996–97 1997–98 |
| 10 | Marcanvis Hymon | 97 | 2014–15 2015–16 2016–17 2017–18 |

Season
| Rk | Player | Blocks | Season |
|---|---|---|---|
| 1 | Reginald Buckner | 98 | 2012–13 |
| 2 | Reginald Buckner | 95 | 2010–11 |
| 3 | Jamarion Sharp | 75 | 2023–24 |
| 4 | Reginald Buckner | 69 | 2011–12 |
| | Aaron Jones | 69 | 2013–14 |
| 6 | Reginald Buckner | 64 | 2009–10 |
| 7 | David Dean | 56 | 1992–93 |
| 8 | David Dean | 52 | 1993–94 |
| 9 | Rahim Lockhart | 49 | 2000–01 |
| | Sean Murphy | 49 | 1990–91 |

Single game
| Rk | Player | Blocks | Season | Opponent |
|---|---|---|---|---|
| 1 | Jamarion Sharp | 9 | 2023–24 | Florida |
| 2 | Reginald Buckner | 8 | 2010–11 | Arkansas |
| | Ansu Sesay | 8 | 1996–97 | Miss. St. |
| 4 | Reginald Buckner | 7 | 2010–11 | Arkansas |
| | Reginald Buckner | 7 | 2010–11 | ETSU |
| | David Dean | 7 | 1992–93 | Alabama |
| | Sean Murphy | 7 | 1988–89 | Christian Bros. |
| 8 | Jamarion Sharp | 6 | 2023–24 | Missouri |
| | Jamarion Sharp | 6 | 2023–24 | Troy |
| | Sebastian Saiz | 6 | 2016–17 | Bradley |
| | Reginald Buckner | 6 | 2012–13 | Fordham |
| | Reginald Buckner | 6 | 2011–12 | MVSU |
| | Reginald Buckner | 6 | 2010–11 | LSU |
| | Terrance Henry | 6 | 2009–10 | UCF |
| | Johnnie Rogers | 6 | 1997–98 | La. Tech |
| | Johnnie Rogers | 6 | 1996–97 | Davidson |
| | David Dean | 6 | 1993–94 | So. Carolina |
| | Sean Murphy | 6 | 1990–91 | Florida |
