= The blindside =

The Blind Side / The Blindside may refer to:

- The Blind Side: Evolution of a Game, a 2006 book about American football, by Michael Lewis
- The Blind Side (film), a 2009 film directed by John Lee Hancock
