= 15th Critics' Choice Awards =

2010 US film awards

- Date: January 15, 2010
- Hosted by: Kristin Chenoweth
- Official website: www.criticschoice.com

Highlights
- Best Film: The Hurt Locker
- Most awards: Avatar (6)
- Most nominations: Inglourious Basterds (10); Nine (10)

Television coverage
- Network: VH1

The 15th Critics' Choice Awards were presented on January 15, 2010 at the Hollywood Palladium, honoring the finest achievements of 2009 filmmaking. The ceremony was broadcast on VH1 and hosted by Kristin Chenoweth. The nominees were announced on December 14, 2009.

The awards expanded this year from 16 to 24 film categories, adding seven technical categories and separating its screenplay category into adapted and original slots, to more closely mirror the Academy Awards.

The World War II epic Inglourious Basterds and romantic musical drama Nine both received a record ten nominations each, which was unprecedented at the time. Both films received numerous nominations in the awards' new craft categories, benefiting from the recent expansion of the categories. In the following years, this record has been broken several times. Avatar followed close behind with nine nominations and won the most awards of the night with a then-record-breaking six wins.

== Winners and nominees ==
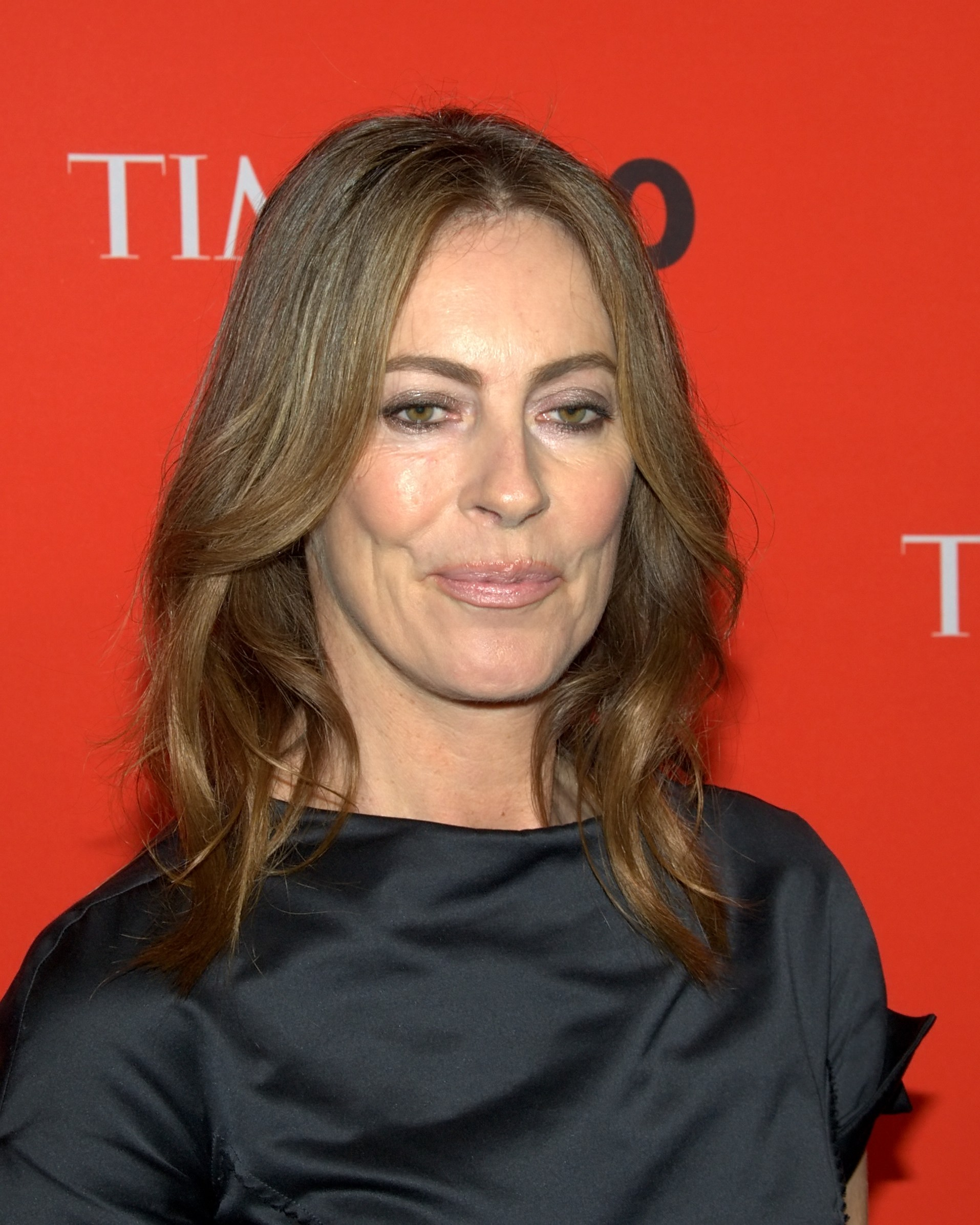
Kathryn Bigelow, Best Director winner

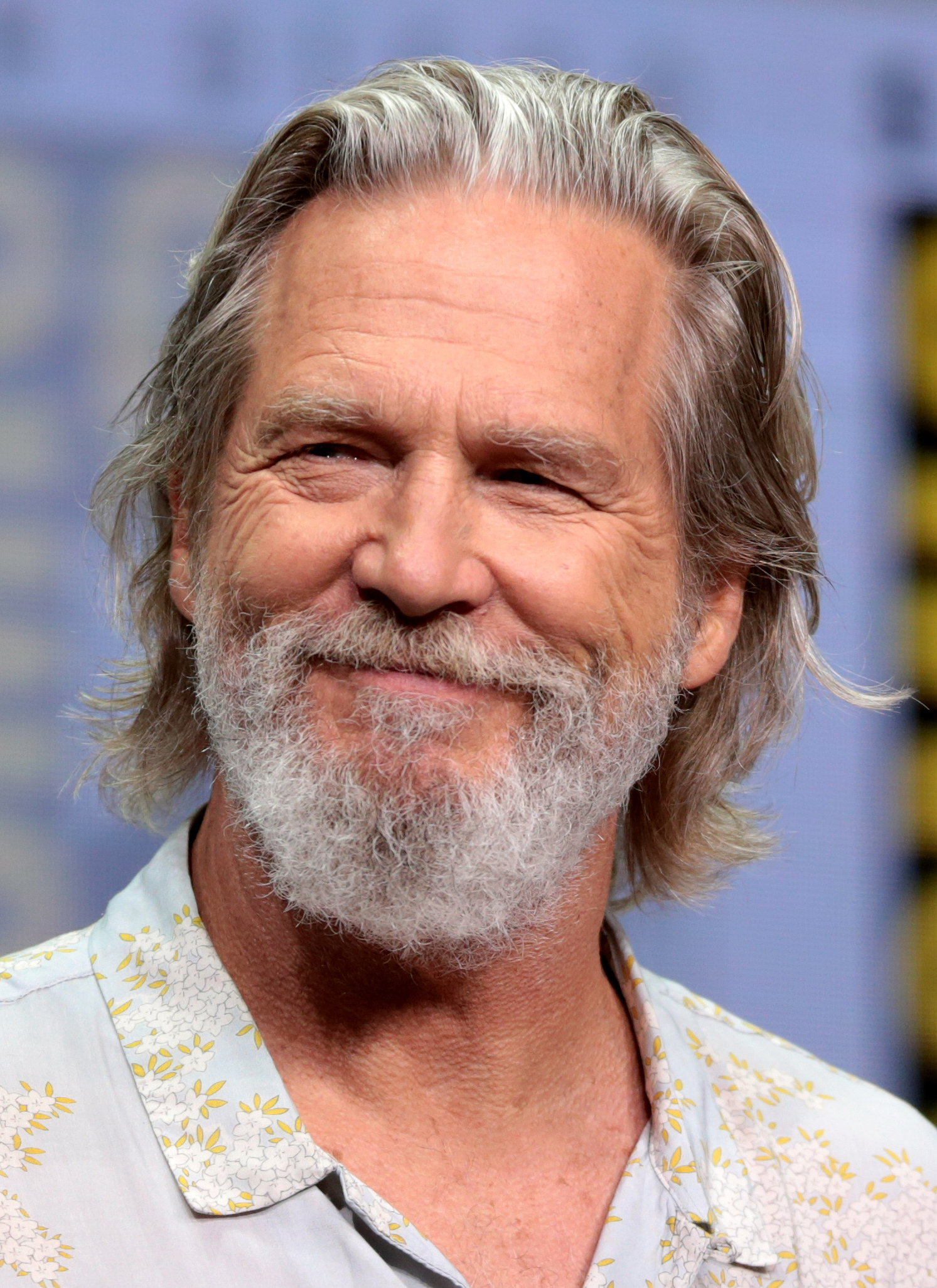
Jeff Bridges, Best Actor winner

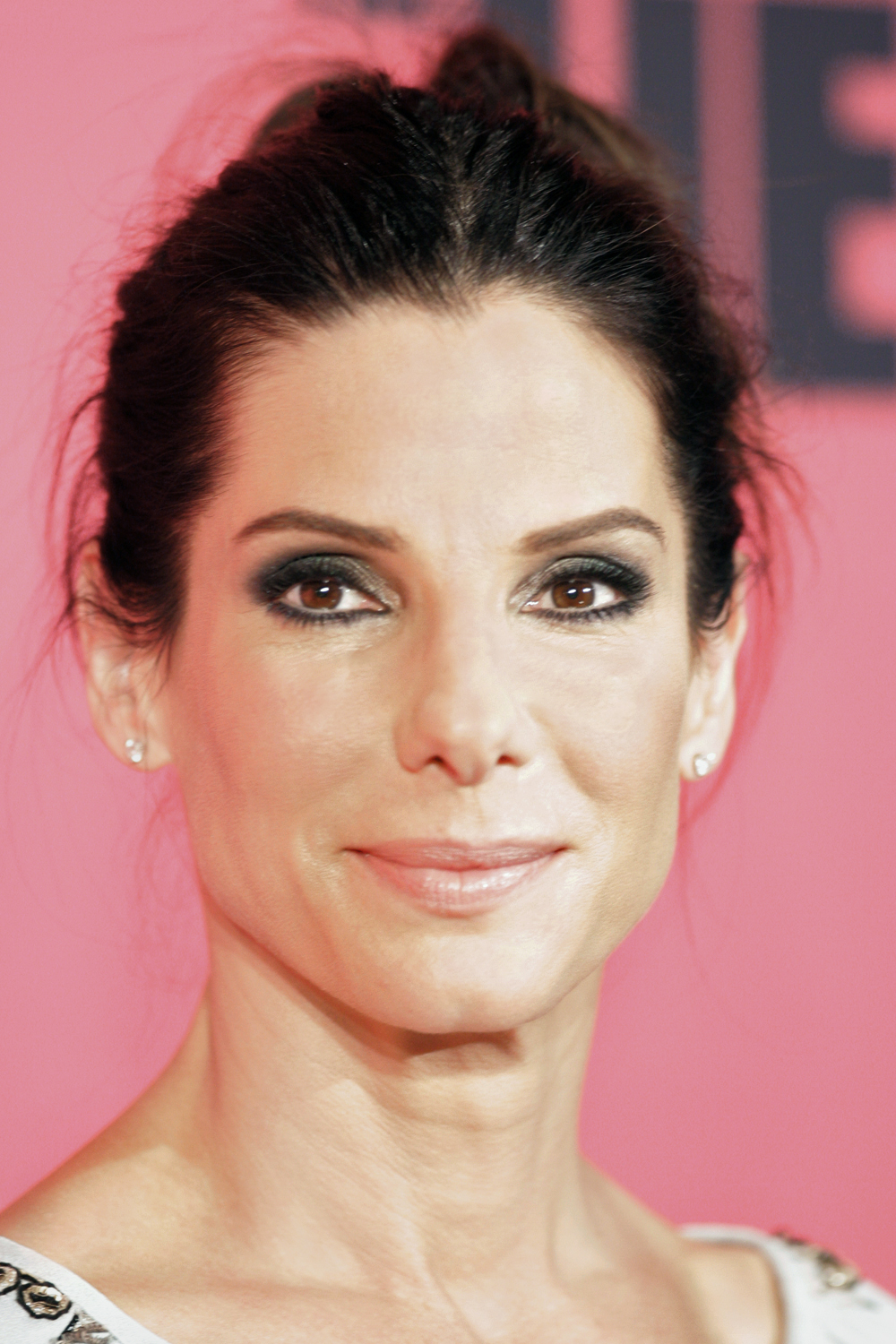
Sandra Bullock, Best Actress co-winner

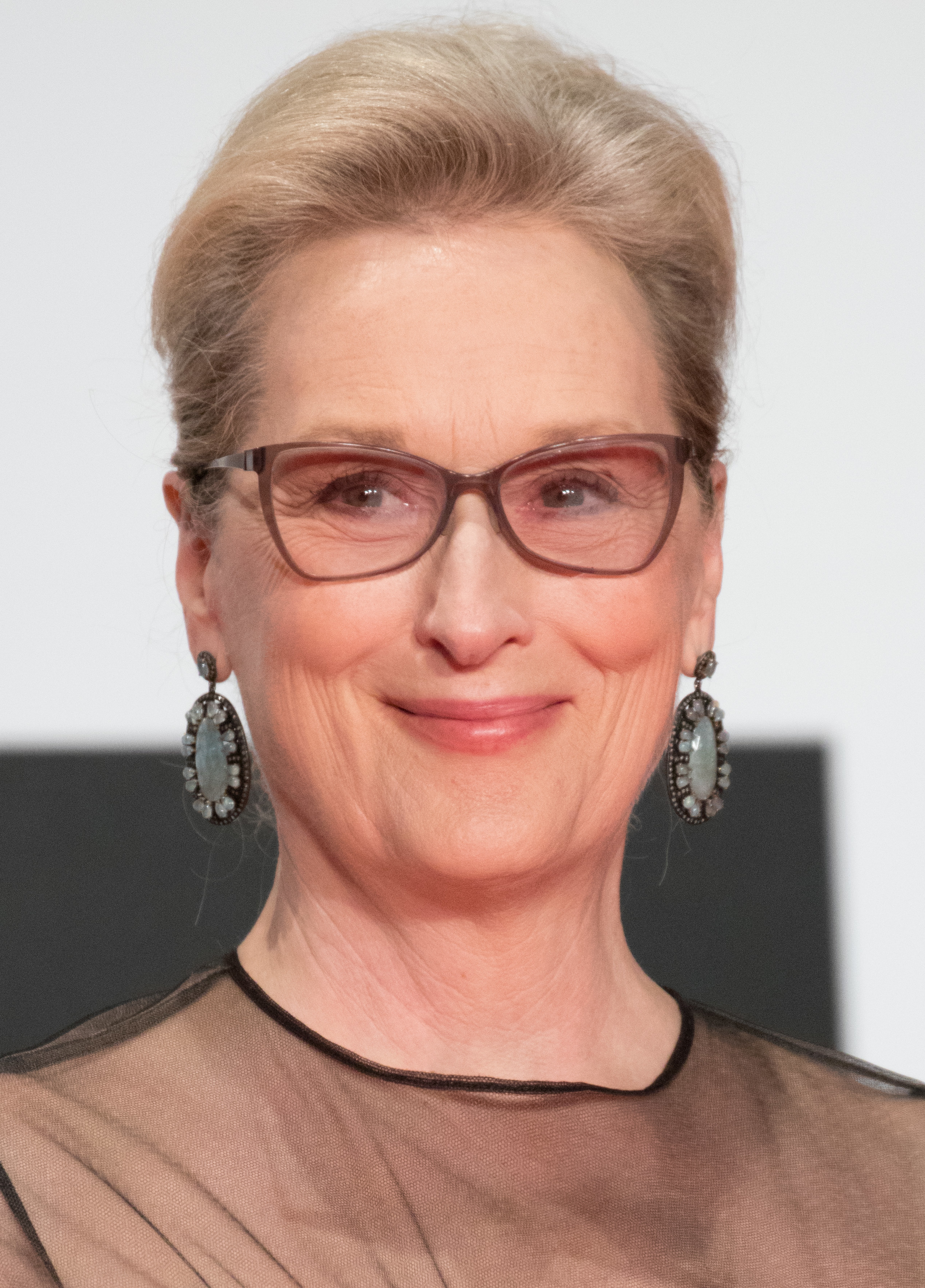
Meryl Streep, Best Actress co-winner

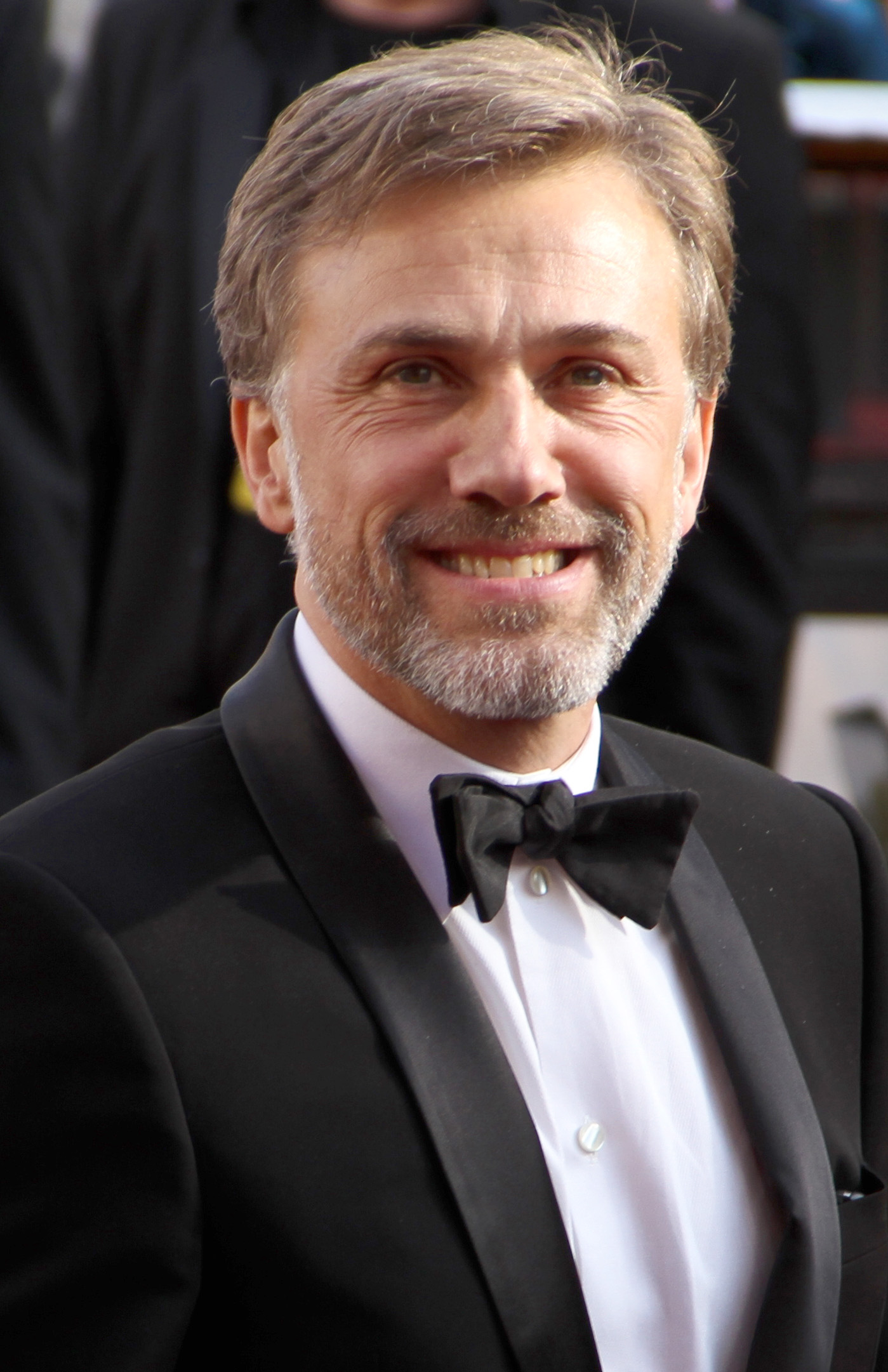
Christoph Waltz, Best Supporting Actor winner

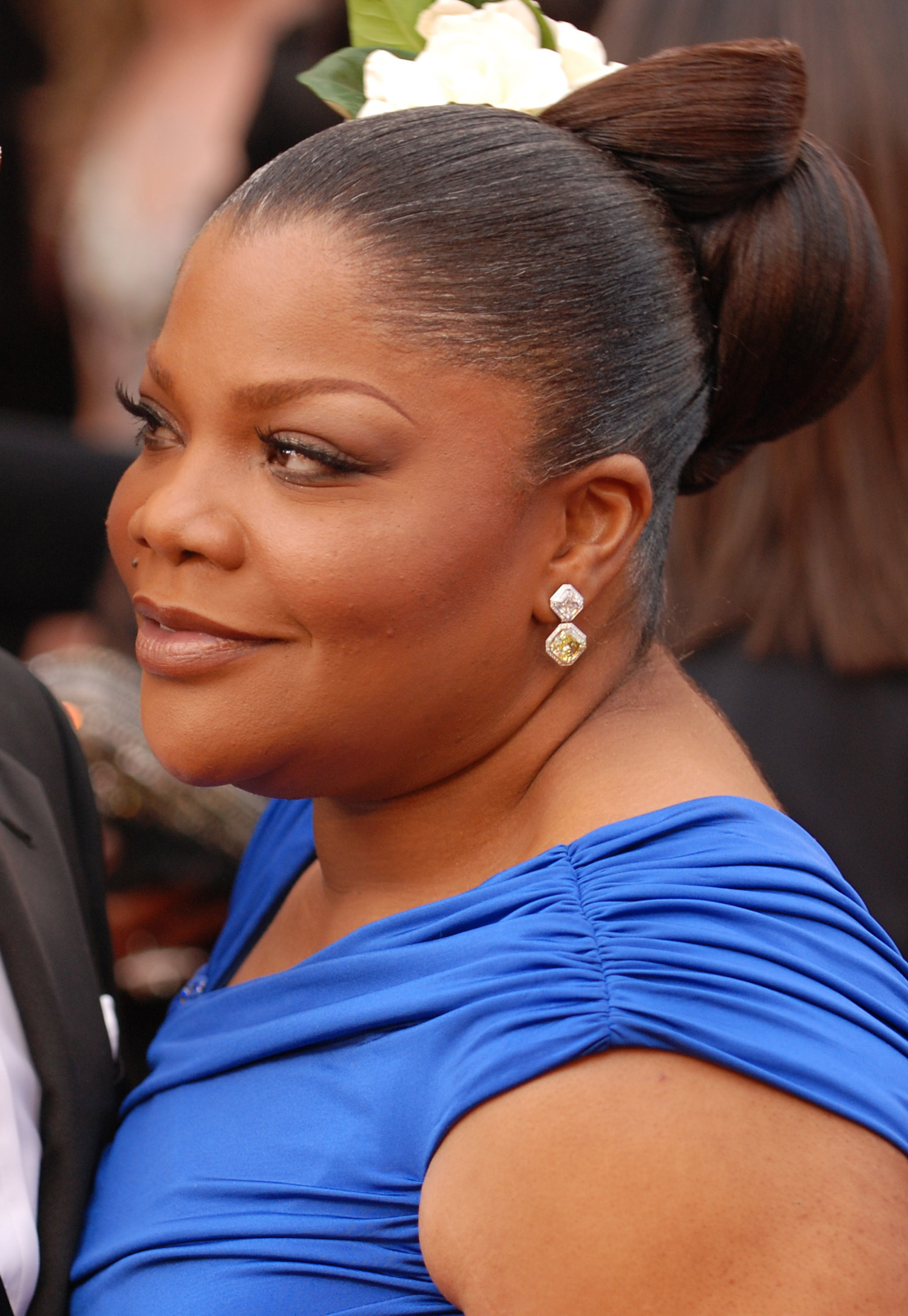
Mo'Nique, Best Supporting Actress winner

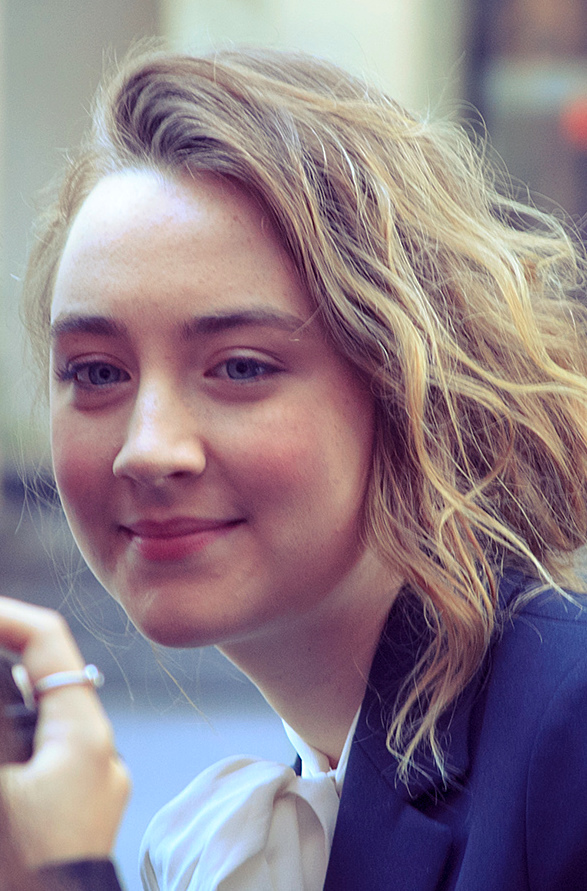
Saoirse Ronan, Best Young Actor/Actress winner

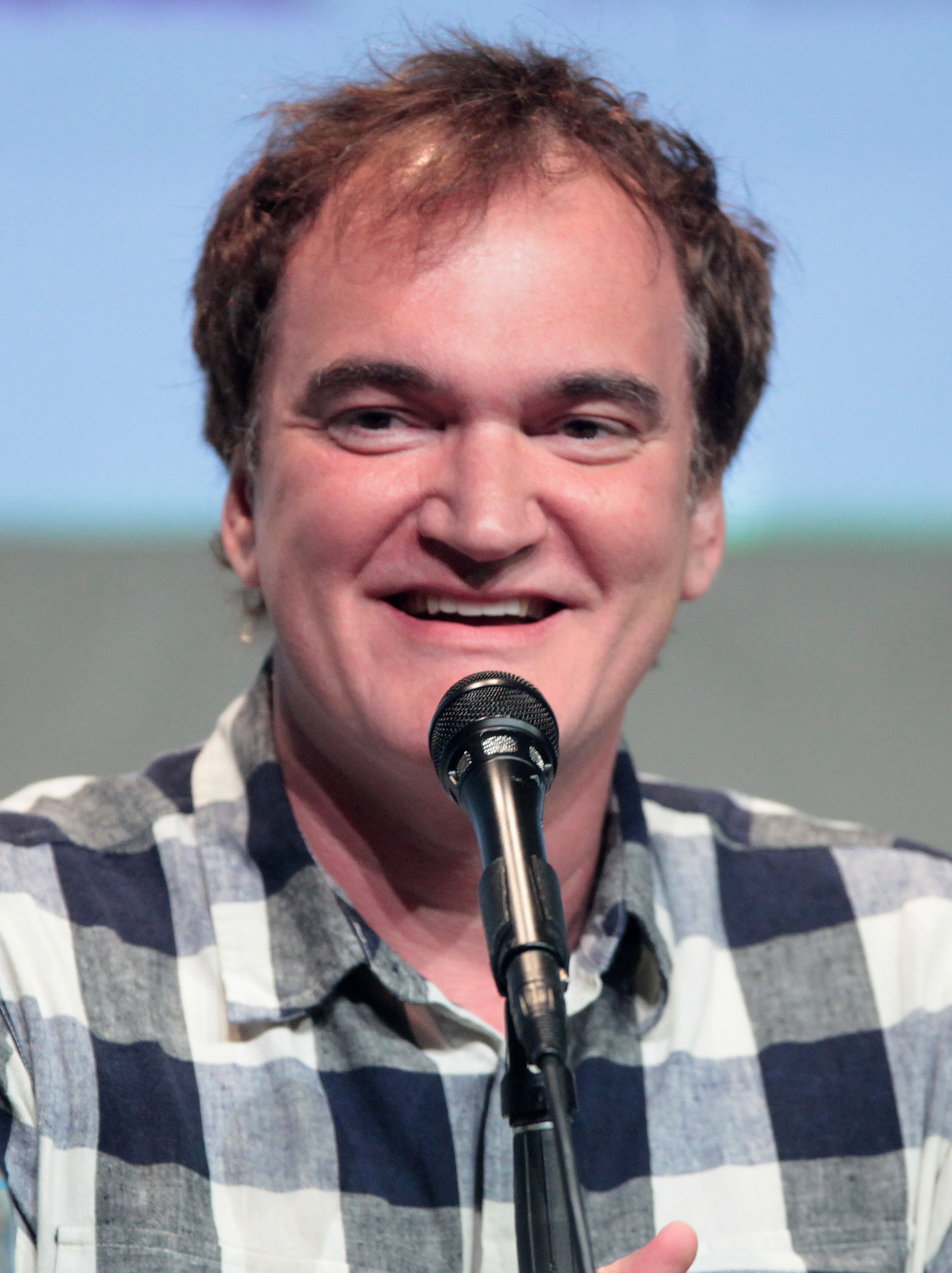
Quentin Tarantino, Best Original Screenplay winner

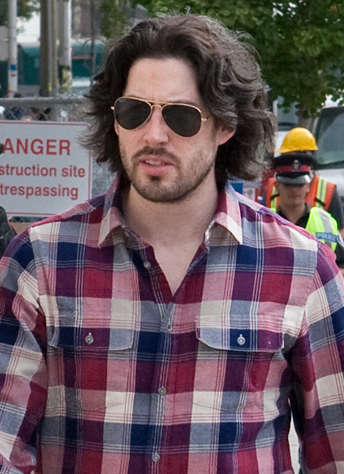
Jason Reitman, Best Adapted Screenplay co-winner

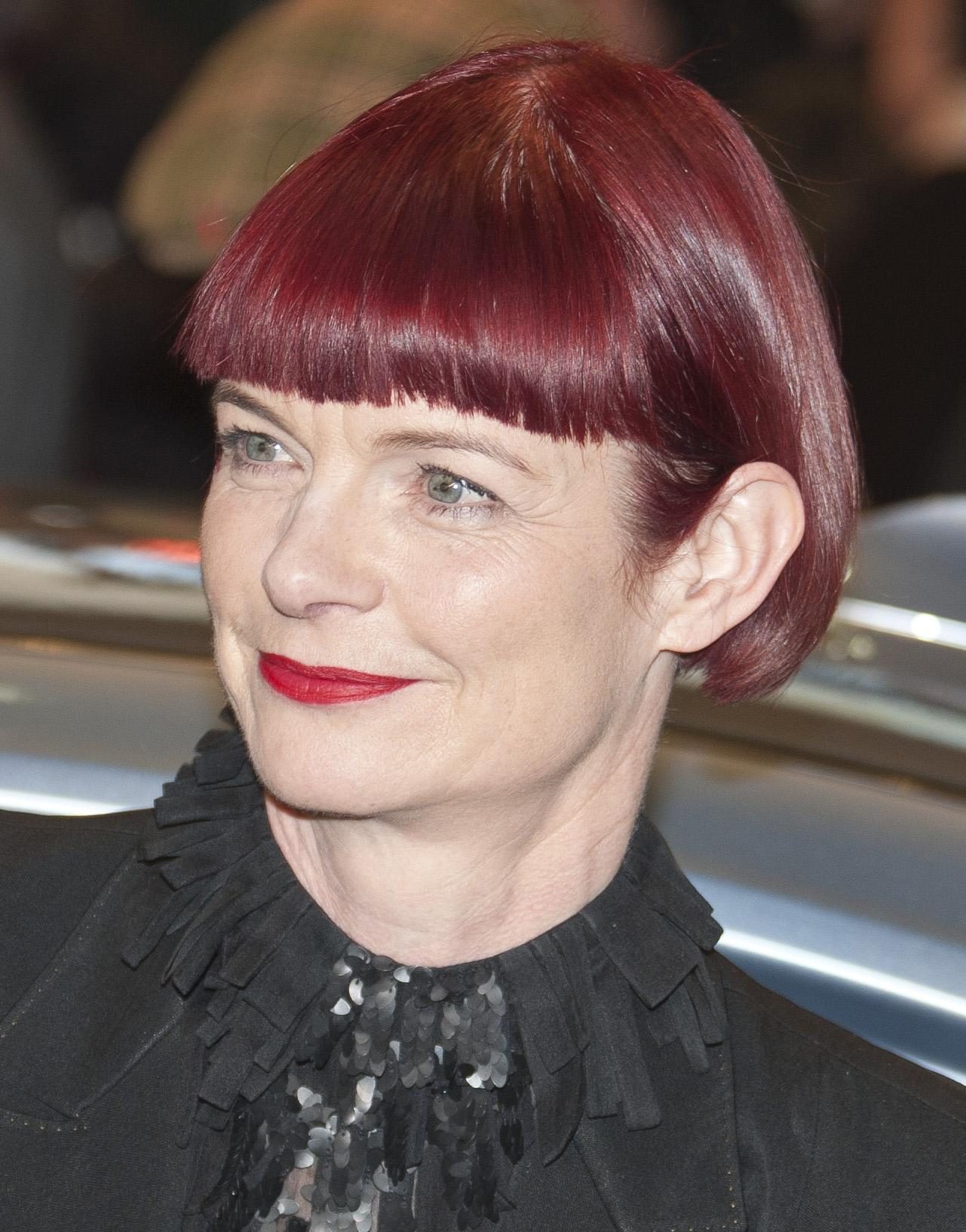
Sandy Powell, Best Costume Design winner

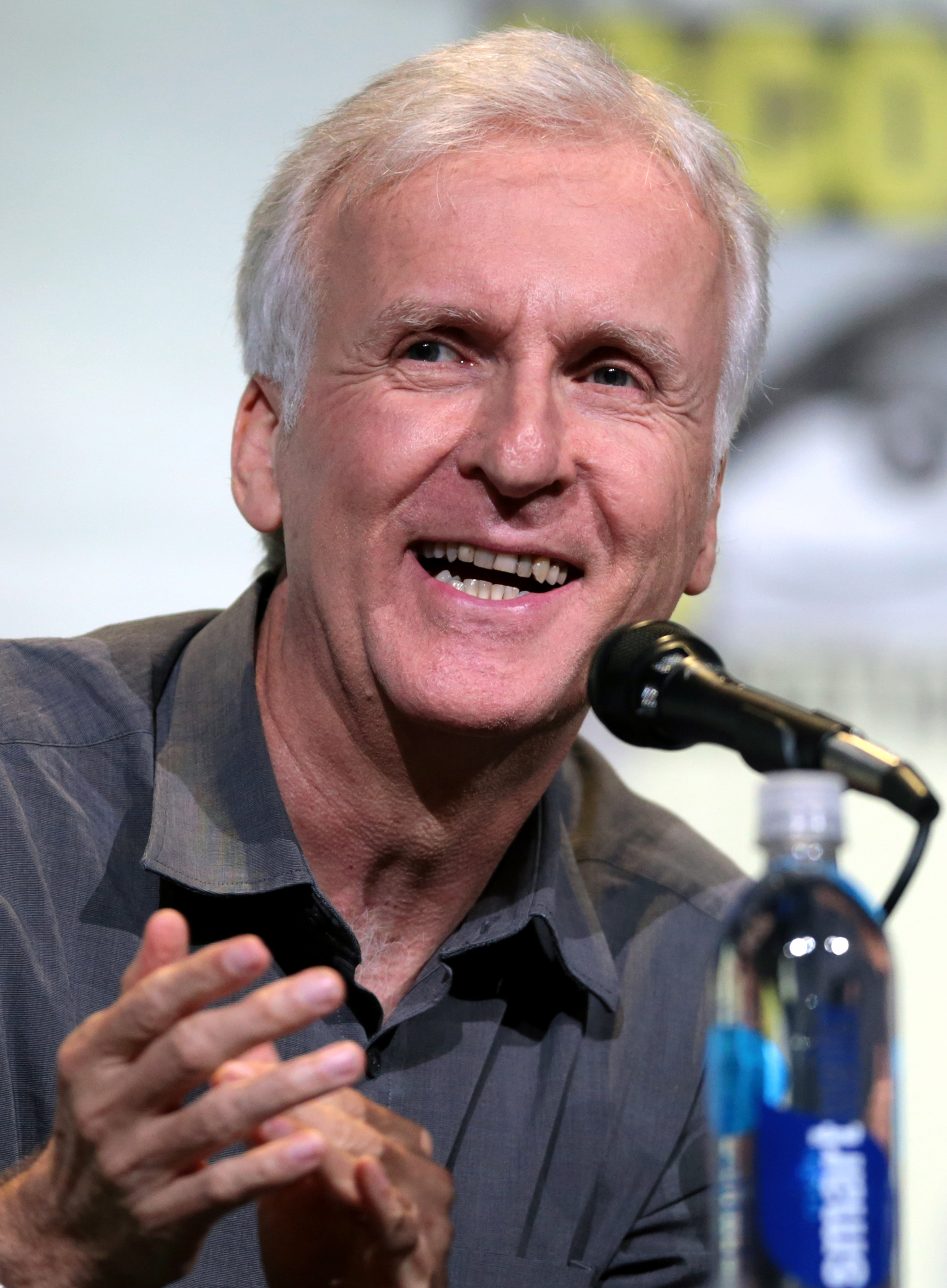
James Cameron, Best Editing co-winner

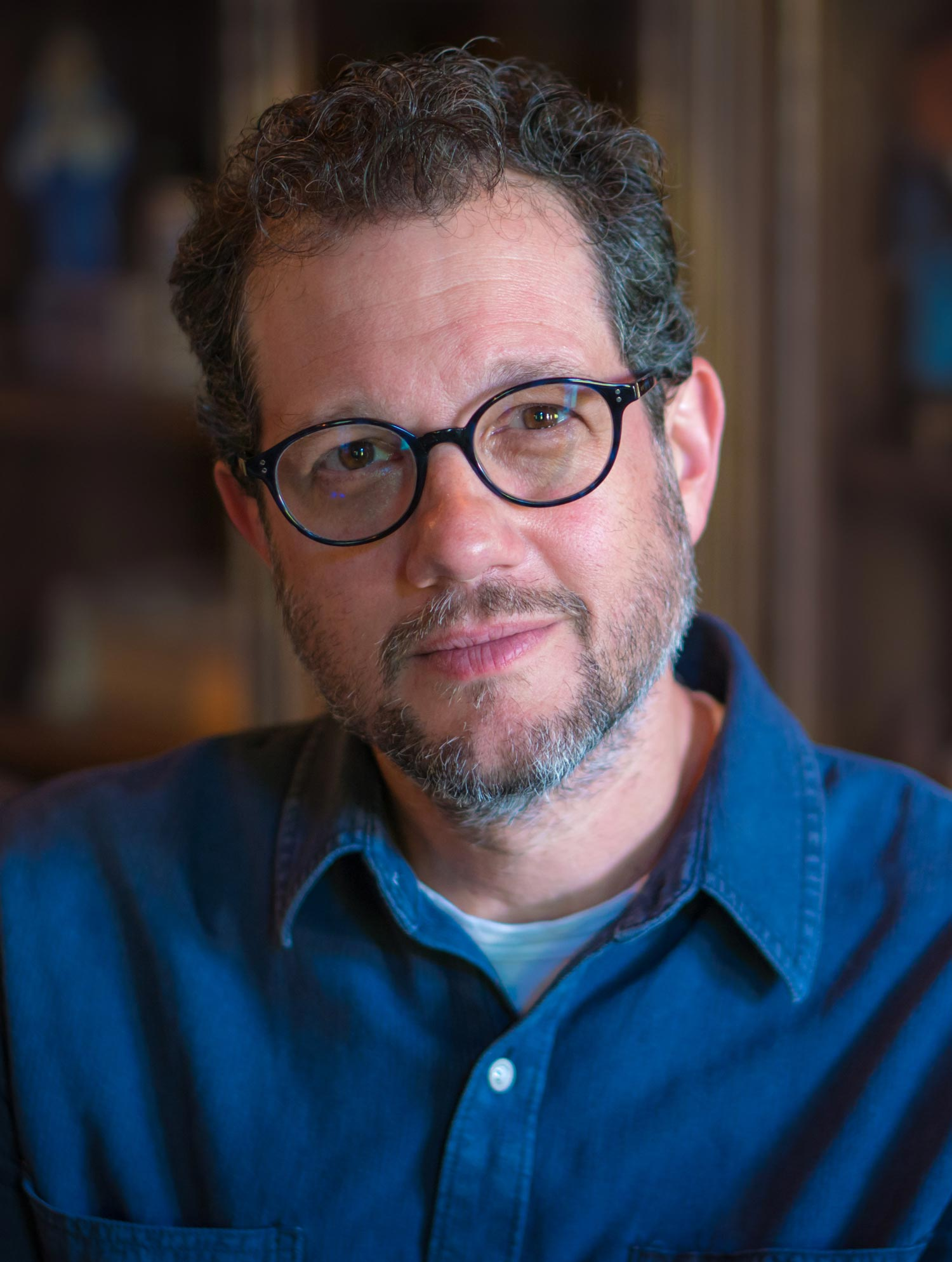
Michael Giacchino, Best Score winner

Best Picture The Hurt Locker: Avatar; An Education; Inglourious Basterds; Invictus; Nine; Precious; A Serious Man; Up; Up in the Air	Best Director Kathryn Bigelow – The Hurt Locker: James Cameron – Avatar; Lee Daniels – Precious; Clint Eastwood – Invictus; Jason Reitman – Up in the Air; Quentin Tarantino – Inglourious Basterds
Best Actor Jeff Bridges – Crazy Heart as Otis "Bad" Blake: George Clooney – Up in the Air as Ryan Bingham; Colin Firth – A Single Man as George Falconer; Morgan Freeman – Invictus as Nelson Mandela; Viggo Mortensen – The Road as Man; Jeremy Renner – The Hurt Locker as Sergeant First Class William James	Best Actress Sandra Bullock – The Blind Side as Leigh Anne Tuohy (TIE); Meryl Streep – Julie & Julia as Julia Child (TIE): Emily Blunt – The Young Victoria as Queen Victoria; Carey Mulligan – An Education as Jenny Mellor; Saoirse Ronan – The Lovely Bones as Susie Salmon; Gabourey Sidibe – Precious as Claireece "Precious" Jones
Best Supporting Actor Christoph Waltz – Inglourious Basterds as Col. Hans Landa: Matt Damon – Invictus as Francois Pienaar; Woody Harrelson – The Messenger as Captain Tony Stone; Christian McKay – Me and Orson Welles as Orson Welles; Alfred Molina – An Education as Jack Meller; Stanley Tucci – The Lovely Bones as George Harvey	Best Supporting Actress Mo'Nique – Precious as Mary Lee Johnston: Marion Cotillard – Nine as Luisa Acari Contini; Vera Farmiga – Up in the Air as Alex Goran; Anna Kendrick – Up in the Air as Natalie Keener; Julianne Moore – A Single Man as Charley Roberts; Samantha Morton – The Messenger as Olivia Pitterson
Best Young Actor/Actress Saoirse Ronan – The Lovely Bones as Susie Salmon: Jae Head – The Blind Side as S. J. Tuohy; Bailee Madison – Brothers as Isabelle Cahill; Max Records – Where the Wild Things Are as Max; Kodi Smit-McPhee – The Road as Boy	Best Acting Ensemble Inglourious Basterds: Nine; Precious; Star Trek; Up in the Air
Best Original Screenplay Inglourious Basterds – Quentin Tarantino: (500) Days of Summer – Scott Neustadter and Michael H. Weber; The Hurt Locker – Mark Boal; A Serious Man – Joel Coen and Ethan Coen; Up – Pete Docter and Bob Peterson	Best Adapted Screenplay Up in the Air – Jason Reitman and Sheldon Turner: District 9 – Neill Blomkamp and Terri Tatchell; An Education – Nick Hornby; Fantastic Mr. Fox – Wes Anderson and Noah Baumbach; Precious – Geoffrey S. Fletcher; A Single Man – Tom Ford and David Scearce
Best Animated Feature Up: Cloudy with a Chance of Meatballs; Coraline; Fantastic Mr. Fox; The Princess and the Frog	Best Documentary Feature The Cove: Anvil! The Story of Anvil; Capitalism: A Love Story; Food, Inc.; Michael Jackson's This Is It
Best Action Movie Avatar: District 9; The Hurt Locker; Inglourious Basterds; Star Trek	Best Comedy Movie The Hangover: (500) Days of Summer; It's Complicated; The Proposal; Zombieland
Best Foreign Language Film Broken Embraces • Spain: Coco Before Chanel • France; Red Cliff • China; Sin nombre • Mexico / United States; The White Ribbon • Austria / France / Germany / Italy	Best Art Direction Avatar – Rick Carter and Robert Stromberg (Production Design) / Kim Sinclair (Set Decoration): Inglourious Basterds – David Wasco (Production Design) / Sandy Reynolds-Wasco (Set Decoration); The Lovely Bones – Naomi Shohan (Production Design) / George DeTitta Jr. (Set Decoration); Nine – John Myhre (Production Design) / Gordon Sim (Set Decoration); A Single Man – Dan Bishop (Production Design) / Amy Wells (Set Decoration)
Best Cinematography Avatar – Mauro Fiore: The Hurt Locker – Barry Ackroyd; Inglourious Basterds – Robert Richardson; The Lovely Bones – Andrew Lesnie; Nine – Dion Beebe	Best Costume Design The Young Victoria – Sandy Powell: Bright Star – Janet Patterson; Inglourious Basterds – Anna B. Sheppard; Nine – Colleen Atwood; Where the Wild Things Are – Casey Storm
Best Editing Avatar – James Cameron, John Refoua, and Stephen E. Rivkin: The Hurt Locker – Chris Innis and Bob Murawski; Inglourious Basterds – Sally Menke; Nine – Claire Simpson and Wyatt Smith; Up in the Air – Dana E. Glauberman	Best Makeup District 9: Avatar; Nine; The Road; Star Trek
Best Score Up – Michael Giacchino: The Informant! – Marvin Hamlisch; The Princess and the Frog – Randy Newman; Sherlock Holmes – Hans Zimmer; Where the Wild Things Are – Carter Burwell and Karen O	Best Song "The Weary Kind" – Crazy Heart: "All Is Love" – Where the Wild Things Are; "Almost There" – The Princess and the Frog; "Cinema Italiano" – Nine; "(I Want to) Come Home" – Everybody's Fine
Best Sound Avatar: District 9; The Hurt Locker; Nine; Star Trek	Best Visual Effects Avatar: 2012; District 9; The Lovely Bones; Star Trek

=== Joel Siegel Award ===
Kevin Bacon

=== Best Picture Made for Television ===
Grey Gardens

- Gifted Hands: The Ben Carson Story
- Into the Storm
- Taking Chance

== Statistics ==
Nominations	Film
10	Inglourious Basterds
10	Nine
9	Avatar
8	The Hurt Locker
8	Up in the Air
6	The Lovely Bones
6	Precious
5	District 9
5	Star Trek
4	An Education
4	Invictus
4	A Single Man
4	Up
4	Where the Wild Things Are
3	The Princess and the Frog
3	The Road
2	(500) Days of Summer
2	The Blind Side
2	Crazy Heart
2	Fantastic Mr. Fox
2	The Messenger
2	A Serious Man
2	The Young Victoria

Wins	Film
6	Avatar
3	Inglourious Basterds
2	Crazy Heart
2	The Hurt Locker
2	Up
