= Broadcast Film Critics Association Awards 2010 =

Broadcast Film Critics Association Awards 2010 may refer to:

- 15th Critics' Choice Awards, the fifteenth Critics' Choice Awards ceremony that took place in 2010
- 16th Critics' Choice Awards, the sixteenth Critics' Choice Awards ceremony that took place in 2011 and which honored the best in film for 2010
