= Tom Lemming =

American football recruiting analyst

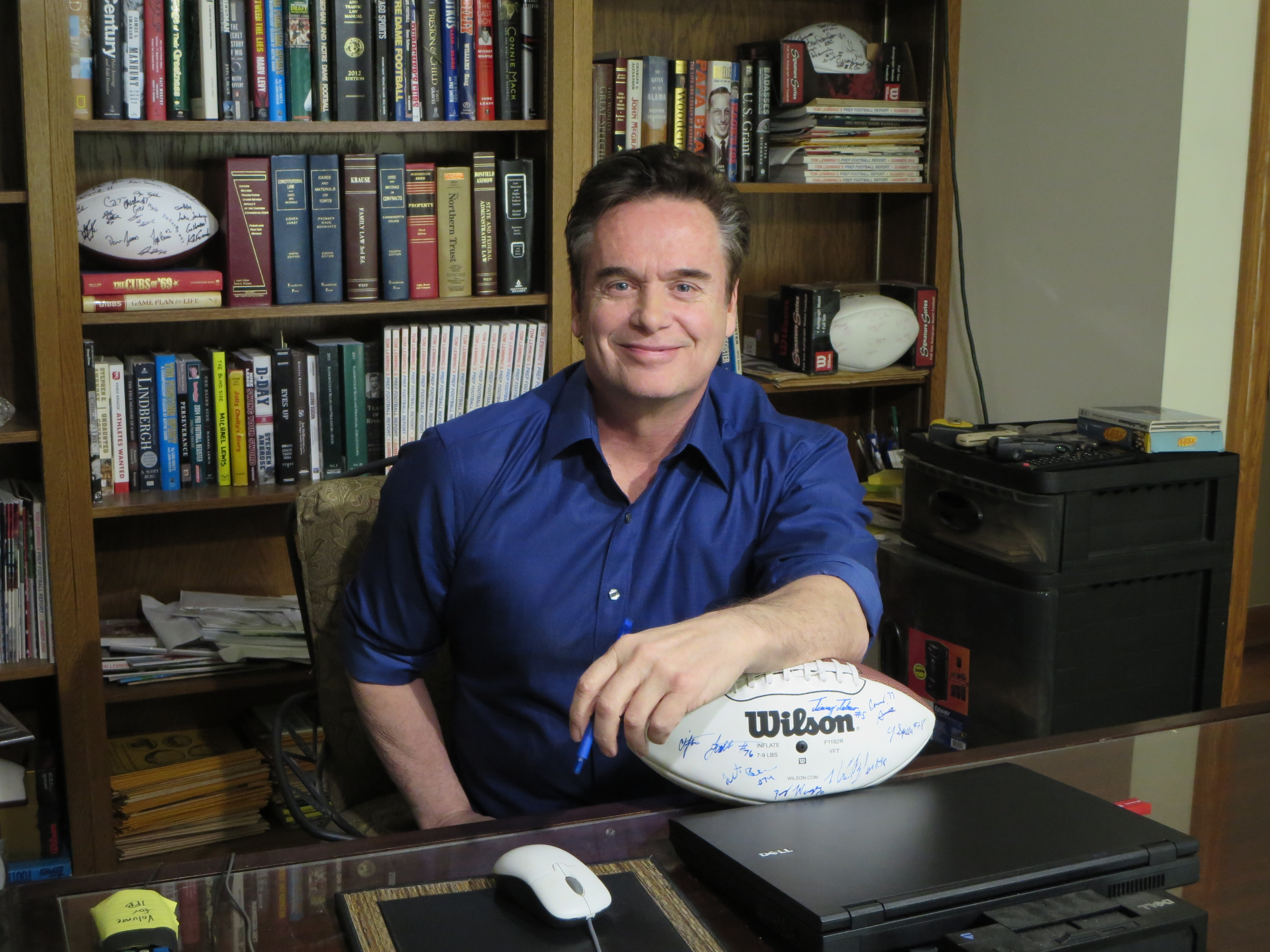
Lemming in 2015

Tom Lemming is an American high school football recruiting analyst. He is host of The Lemming Report on CBS Sports Network, the only national weekly high school football recruiting show. He is the editor of The Tom Lemming Prep Football Report, considered by many to be "the bible" of college football recruiting.

Lemming, a Chicago native, got his start as a stringer for suburban Chicago weeklies covering high school football games. In 1978, he began scouting football prospects, interviewing John Elway, Dan Marino, and Eric Dickerson, and filed his first Prep Football Report in 1979.

Lemming was featured in Michael Lewis's critically acclaimed book, The Blind Side, and played himself in the 2009 Oscar-winning movie of the same name. He also appeared in The Hopeful in 2011, an award-winning documentary on high school football. He travels the country each year and personally interviews hundreds of high school athletes in order to produce his prep football report, a 360-page magazine. He has also co-authored a book, Football's Second Season, which chronicles his cross country journeys and his passion as a recruiting analyst. Lemming has written for ESPN, USA Today and is often quoted in newspapers across the country and appears on over 200 radio shows a year.
