= Michael Oher =

American football player (born 1986)

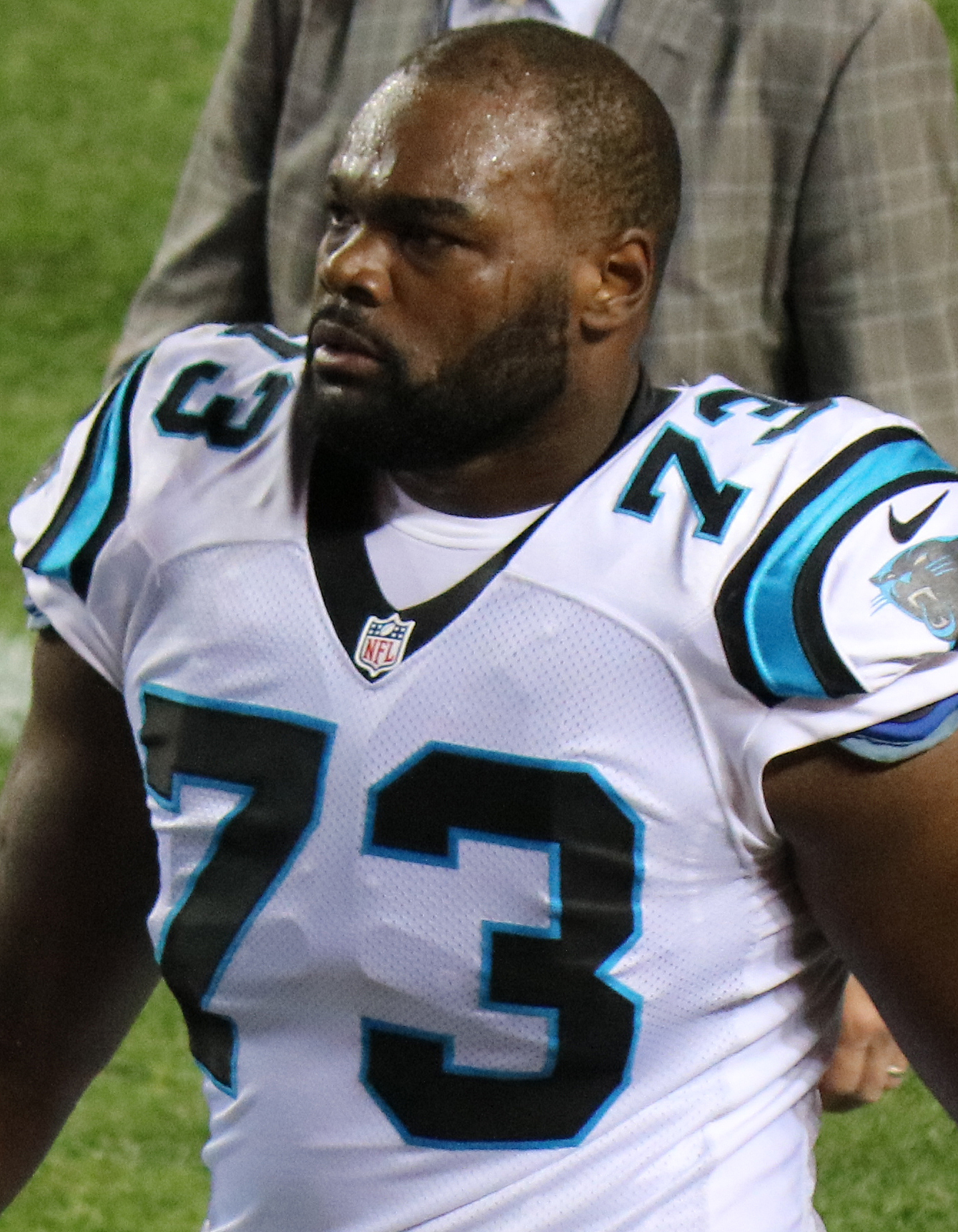
- Oher with the Carolina Panthers in 2016

No. 74, 72, 73
- Position: Tackle

Personal information
- Born: May 28, 1986 (age 40); Memphis, Tennessee, U.S.
- Listed height: 6 ft 4 in (1.93 m)
- Listed weight: 315 lb (143 kg)

Career information
- High school: Briarcrest (Eads, Tennessee)
- College: Ole Miss (2005–2008)
- NFL draft: 2009: 1st round, 23rd overall pick

Career history
- Baltimore Ravens (2009–2013); Tennessee Titans (2014); Carolina Panthers (2015–2016)

Awards and highlights
- Super Bowl champion (XLVII); PFWA All-Rookie Team (2009); Jacobs Blocking Trophy (2008); Unanimous All-American (2008); 2× First-team All-SEC (2007, 2008); Second-team All-SEC (2006)

Career NFL statistics
- Games played: 110
- Games started: 110
- Stats at Pro Football Reference

Michael Jerome Oher (/ɔːr/; né Williams Jr.; born May 28, 1986) is an American former professional football tackle who played in the National Football League (NFL) for eight seasons. He played college football for the Ole Miss Rebels, earning unanimous All-American honors and winning the Jacobs Blocking Trophy in 2008. Oher was selected in the first round of the 2009 NFL draft by the Baltimore Ravens, where he spent his first five seasons and was a member of the team that won Super Bowl XLVII. He later played one season for the Tennessee Titans and his final two for the Carolina Panthers.

Oher's life through his final year of high school and first year of college is one of the subjects of Michael Lewis's 2006 book The Blind Side: Evolution of a Game and was dramatized in the 2009 film adaptation.

== Early life ==
Oher was born in Memphis, Tennessee; he was one of 12 children of Denise Oher. His mother suffered from alcoholism and crack cocaine addiction, and his father, Michael Jerome Williams, was frequently in prison. He received little attention or discipline during his childhood. He repeated first and second grades, and attended eleven schools during his first nine years as a student. He was placed in foster care at age seven, and alternated between living in various foster homes and periods of homelessness. Oher's father was murdered when Oher was a senior in high school.

Oher played football during his freshman year at a public high school in Memphis. He applied for admission to Briarcrest Christian School at the suggestion of Tony Henderson, an auto mechanic with whom he was living temporarily. Henderson was enrolling his son at the school to fulfill the dying wish of the boy's grandmother and thought Oher might enroll as well. The school's football coach, Hugh Freeze, submitted Oher's school application to the headmaster, who agreed to accept him if Oher could complete a home study program first. He did not finish the program, but was admitted when the headmaster realized that his requirement had removed Oher from the public education system.

Coached by Freeze and Tim Long, Briarcrest's offensive line coach, Oher was named Division II (2A) Lineman of the Year in 2003, and First-team Tennessee All-State. Scout.com rated Oher a five-star recruit and the No. 5 offensive lineman prospect in the country. Before that season and for his prior 20 months at Briarcrest, Oher had been living with several foster families. In 2004, Leigh Anne and Sean Tuohy, a couple with a daughter and son attending Briarcrest, invited Oher to live with them. When the family learned about his difficult childhood, they began to help him succeed academically and socially. They hired a tutor for him, who worked 20 hours per week with him. Oher would later allege in 2023 that they tricked him into signing a document making them conservators while telling him it was the same as adoption.

Oher earned two letters each in track and basketball. He averaged 22 points and 10 rebounds per game, earning All-State honors by helping lead the basketball team to a 27–6 record and winning the district championship in Oher's senior year. Oher was also a state runner-up in the discus as a senior.

Oher's initial low grades were a barrier to his acceptance to an NCAA program. He raised his 0.76 grade point average (GPA) to a 2.52 GPA by the end of his senior year so he could attend a Division I school, by enrolling in 10-day online courses from Brigham Young University. Taking and passing the online courses allowed him to replace D's and F's earned in earlier school classes, such as English, with A's, raising his graduating GPA above the required minimum.

At the conclusion of his senior season, Oher participated in the 2005 U.S. Army All-American Bowl.

== College career ==
Though he received scholarship offers from Tennessee, LSU, Alabama, Auburn, and South Carolina, Oher ultimately decided to play for Ed Orgeron at the University of Mississippi, the alma mater of his guardians, Leigh Anne and Sean Tuohy. His decision to play for the Ole Miss Rebels football team sparked an investigation by the National Collegiate Athletic Association (NCAA). The first issue was that Oher's grade-point average (GPA) was still too low to meet the requirements for a Division I scholarship at the time of the offer from Ole Miss. That difficulty was corrected by graduation, when Oher completed online classes through Brigham Young University. The second issue was the Tuohys' preexisting relationship with the school and the fact that Ole Miss hired Freeze twenty days after Oher signed his letter of intent. Freeze asserted that his position with Ole Miss was not an example of quid pro quo for encouraging Oher to attend the school, but rather the result of his preexisting relationship with Ole Miss offensive coordinator Noel Mazzone. The NCAA did not close its case on its suspicions of collusion. However, it ruled that Ole Miss had committed no NCAA violations in its recruitment of Oher. Freeze was found guilty of secondary violations for contacting other Memphis-area recruits before joining the Ole Miss staff.

Oher started in ten games as a guard during his first season with the Ole Miss Rebels, becoming a first-team freshman All-American. After shifting to the position of left tackle for the 2006 season, he was named to various preseason All-Conference and All-American teams. He was named a second-team Southeastern Conference (SEC) offensive lineman after his sophomore season and a first-team SEC offensive lineman after his junior season. He was academically successful at Ole Miss, and his tested IQ score increased 20–30 points between when he was measured in the public-school systems and in college.

On January 14, 2008, Oher declared that he would be entering the 2008 NFL draft. However, two days later, he announced his withdrawal from the draft to return to Ole Miss for his senior season. After the 2008 season, Oher was recognized as a unanimous All-American, made the honor roll for the second time (the first time being his sophomore year), and graduated with a degree in criminal justice in the spring of 2009.

=== College awards and honors ===
- 2005 First-team Freshman All-American
- 2005 First-team All-Quad Freshman Chrome [AQFC] Tackle Letius
- 2005 First-team SEC All-Freshman
- 2006 Second-team All-SEC
- 2007 First-team All-SEC
- 2008 First-team All-American
- 2008 First-team All-SEC
- 2008 Shug Jordan Award as the Southeast Offensive Lineman of the Year
- 2008 Colonel Earl "Red" Blaik Leadership-Scholarship Award
- 2008 Outland Trophy finalist
- 2008 Conerly Trophy finalist
- 2008 Lombardi Award semifinalist
- 2008 SEC Jacobs Blocking Trophy

== Professional career ==
=== Pre-draft ===
Already in 2008, Oher was projected as one of the top prospects for the 2009 NFL draft.

Pre-draft measurables
Height	Weight	Arm length	Hand span	40-yard dash	10-yard split	20-yard split	20-yard shuttle	Three-cone drill	Vertical jump	Broad jump	Bench press	Wonderlic
6 ft 4 1/2 in (1.94 m)	309 lb (140 kg)	33 1/2 in (0.85 m)	10 3/8 in (0.26 m)	5.16 s	1.75 s	2.99 s	4.60 s	7.81 s	31.0 in (0.79 m)	8 ft 7 in (2.62 m)	23 reps	19
All values from NFL Combine/Pro Day

=== Baltimore Ravens ===
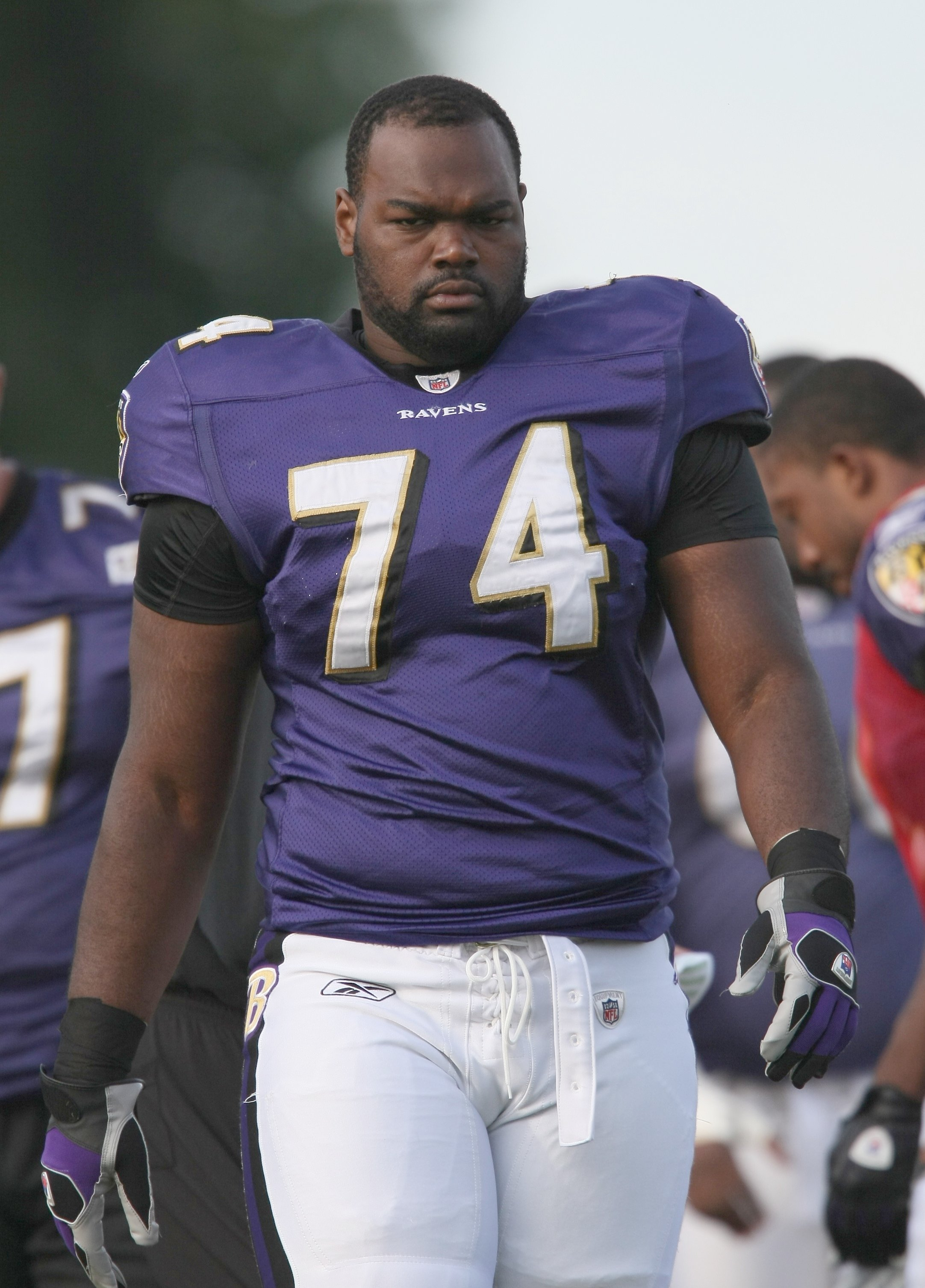
Oher with the Baltimore Ravens in 2009

The Baltimore Ravens selected Oher with the 23rd pick in the first round of the 2009 NFL draft. The Ravens had acquired the pick from the New England Patriots in exchange for their first- and fifth-round draft picks. The Tuohy family was there to witness his draft day selection.

On July 30, 2009, Oher signed a five-year, $13.8 million contract with the Ravens. He started the 2009 season as right tackle, but was moved to left tackle after an injury to lineman Jared Gaither. In week eight, he returned to right tackle.

Oher started every game in 2009, eleven at right tackle and five at left tackle. He played right tackle in his first post-season game, January 10, 2010, against the New England Patriots, and did not allow a single sack as the Ravens won 33–14.

Oher was second in the voting for Associated Press' NFL Offensive Rookie of the Year Award, with six votes.

Prior to the 2010 NFL season, Oher was moved to the left tackle position. During the 2011 pre-season, the Ravens announced that Oher would be moving back to the right side. On February 3, 2013, Oher won a Super Bowl ring as the Ravens' starting right tackle as the team defeated the San Francisco 49ers 34–31 in Super Bowl XLVII.

=== Tennessee Titans ===
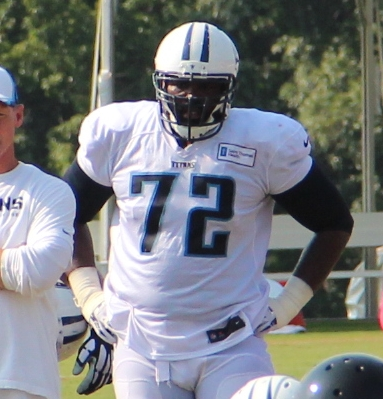
Oher with the Tennessee Titans, 2014

On March 14, 2014, Oher signed a four-year, $20 million contract with the Tennessee Titans. Oher started eleven games for the Titans, but he was placed on injured reserve on December 13 after missing the previous two games due to a toe injury. Pro Football Focus graded Oher as the 74th best tackle out of 78 for the 2014 season. The Titans released Oher on February 5, 2015.

=== Carolina Panthers ===
On March 6, 2015, Oher signed a two-year, $7 million contract with the Carolina Panthers. Dave Gettleman, the Panthers GM, said that Oher would be the Panthers' starting left tackle going into the season despite his struggles in Tennessee, saying, "We did our homework on Michael, and we feel very strongly that he can be an answer for us. He'll be inserted at left tackle, and we'll go from there." Oher cited Cam Newton as an influential factor in his decision to sign with Carolina. Oher responded with one of his best seasons as a professional, protecting Newton's blind side. He played in 98.4% of the team's snaps, allowed a career-low four sacks—tied for eighth-fewest in the league—and was penalized only three times for 25 yards.

Oher played in his second Super Bowl that season, Super Bowl 50, as the starting left tackle. In the game, the Panthers lost to the Denver Broncos 24–10.

Oher signed a three-year contract extension with the Panthers on June 17, 2016, worth $21.6 million with $9.5 million guaranteed. He was placed on injured reserve on November 25, 2016, with a concussion—having played in only three games during the 2016 season.

On July 20, 2017, Oher was released by the Panthers after a failed physical.

== Books ==
Oher is one of the subjects of Michael Lewis's 2006 book, The Blind Side: Evolution of a Game. Before the book was published, excerpts appeared in The New York Times Magazine as "The Ballad of Big Mike". His portion of the book was adapted for film and was directed by John Lee Hancock. The Blind Side movie was released in the United States on November 20, 2009. The movie stars Quinton Aaron as Michael Oher, alongside Sandra Bullock and Tim McGraw. It was nominated for Academy Awards for Best Picture and Best Actress for Bullock, and Bullock won the Oscar for her portrayal of Leigh Anne Tuohy.

Oher wrote his autobiography, I Beat the Odds: From Homelessness to The Blind Side and Beyond, in 2011.

== Personal life ==
Oher began dating Tiffany Roy after first meeting her at the University of Mississippi. They went on to have four children together, two sons and two daughters. They became engaged on July 21, 2021, and married on November 5, 2022, in Nashville, Tennessee. At the time of their marriage, they had been together for 17 years.

=== Legal claims against Tuohy family ===
In August 2023, Oher filed a lawsuit alleging that Leigh Ann and Sean Tuohy never actually adopted him, but instead created a conservatorship that granted them legal authority to make business deals in his name. He alleged that the Tuohys used their power as conservators to strike a deal that paid them and their two children millions of dollars in royalties from The Blind Side movie while Oher got nothing. The producers of the movie, Broderick Johnson and Andrew Kosove, and the author of the book, Michael Lewis, denied the Tuohys were paid "millions", claiming the family was paid about $700,000 after taxes.

Oher's legal action asked the court to end the Tuohys' conservatorship and issue an injunction barring them from using his name and likeness. It also asked for a full accounting of the money the Tuohys earned using Oher's name, to be paid his share of profits, and other compensatory and punitive damages. The Tuohy family later claimed in legal documents Oher tried to extort $15 million from them or else he would take his accusations to the press and social media.

A judge ended the conservatorship and declined to dismiss the case in September 2023. The Tuohys also later told the court they would remove all references to Oher being adopted from their website and public speaking materials.
