= Leigh Anne Tuohy =

American businesswoman and interior designer

- Born: Leigh Anne Roberts; August 9, 1960 (age 66); Memphis, Tennessee, U.S.
- Education: University of Mississippi
- Occupations: Businesswoman; Interior designer
- Spouse: Sean Tuohy (m. 1982)
- Children: 2

Leigh Anne Tuohy (née Roberts; born August 9, 1960) is an American businesswoman and interior designer. She was the guardian of the football player Michael Oher. Their story was featured in the 2006 book The Blind Side: Evolution of a Game and its 2009 feature film adaptation The Blind Side. In the film, Tuohy was portrayed by Sandra Bullock, who won an Academy Award and a Golden Globe Award for her performance.

== Early life ==
She was born in Memphis, Tennessee. Growing up, she was close to her maternal grandmother who lived with her family. She graduated from Briarcrest Christian School in Memphis. In the early 1980s, she graduated from University of Mississippi, where she became a member of the Kappa Delta sorority, was a cheerleader, and met her future husband, Sean Tuohy, a basketball player for the Ole Miss Rebels.

== Career ==
Tuohy and her husband once owned 115 fast food franchises of Taco Bell and Kentucky Fried Chicken, but as of 2020 owned 11, having sold the majority in six separate transactions.

Tuohy is an interior designer. In 2010, she was named one of three new design team members for ABC's Extreme Makeover: Home Edition.

Tuohy and her husband are also the co-authors of the book In a Heartbeat: Sharing the Power of Cheerful Giving, which was published in 2010.

== Personal life ==
Tuohy married her husband Sean Tuohy, an Irish American, in 1982, and they live in Memphis, Tennessee. They have two children and were reported to have had adopted Michael Oher, but in actuality he signed a conservatorship. Oher later went on to be an offensive lineman in the National Football League.

Their daughter, Collins Tuohy, was a state champion pole vaulter and a cheerleader at the University of Mississippi. Their son Sean "SJ" Tuohy Jr. played basketball for the Loyola Greyhounds.

In August 2023, Oher filed a lawsuit alleging the Tuohys had not adopted him but misled him into signing a conservatorship agreement under the belief it was adoption papers. The agreement enabled them to make business deals under his name including (allegedly) the creation of the movie The Blind Side and the selling off of Oher's perpetual likeness and life story to Fox. In an interview, Sean Tuohy agreed that the agreement was a conservatorship, but he said it was created since Oher was older than eighteen, and the NCAA was concerned about him playing at the University of Mississippi, a school where the Tuohys were financial boosters. The Tuohys released a statement through their attorney that alleged Oher had threatened to plant a negative news story if the couple did not give him $15 million, claiming that he had attempted this on previous occasions, but that he had struggled to find lawyers to take the case. A judge ended the conservatorship and declined to dismiss the case in September 2023. The Tuohys later told the court they would remove all mentions to Oher being adopted from their website and public speaking advertisements.

Tuohy gave the commencement address at Christian Brothers University on May 14, 2010. She also received an honorary degree from the university during its commencement ceremony for her commitment to the less fortunate and her ongoing quest to recruit others to make a difference.
