= Jarvis Summers =

American basketball player

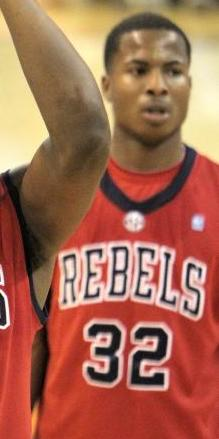
- Summers with Ole Miss Rebels

No. 32 – Hangtuah Jakarta
- Position: Point guard
- League: IBL

Personal information
- Born: March 16, 1993 (age 33)
- Listed height: 6 ft 3 in (1.91 m)
- Listed weight: 180 lb (82 kg)

Career information
- High school: Provine (Jackson, Mississippi)
- College: Ole Miss (2011–2015)
- NBA draft: 2015: undrafted
- Playing career: 2015–present

Career history
- 2015–2016: Rio Grande Valley Vipers
- 2016–2017: BK Levickí Patrioti
- 2017–2018: Wisconsin Herd
- 2019: Aldar Tanan Garid
- 2019: Red Baron
- 2020: Halcones de Ciudad Obregón
- 2021: Cantho Catfish
- 2022: Halcones de Ciudad Obregón
- 2022: Rockhampton Rockets
- 2022: Mineros de Zacatecas
- 2023: Rockhampton Rockets
- 2023–2024: Darkhan United
- 2024: Halcones de Ciudad Obregón
- 2024: Mineros de Zacatecas
- 2026-present: Hangtuah Jakarta

Career highlights
- CIBACOPA All-Star (2022)

Jarvis Terrell Summers (born March 16, 1993) is an American professional basketball player for Hangtuah Jakarta of the Indonesian Basketball League (IBL). He played college basketball for Ole Miss Rebels.

== College career ==
Summers averaged 10.4 points and 2.4 rebounds per game as the starting point guard at Ole Miss as a freshman. He posted 9.1 points and 1.8 rebounds per game as a sophomore. As a junior, Summers averaged 17.2 points, 2.5 rebounds, and 3.9 assists per game. He received the Howell Trophy honoring the best college basketball player in Mississippi. Summers was named to the Second Team All-SEC as a junior. He averaged 12 points and 1.8 rebounds per game as a senior. He finished his career ranked second in program history in games played (134) and assists (530) and eighth in points (1,629). After his senior season at Ole Miss, Summers underwent surgery.

== Professional career ==
After not being selected in the 2015 NBA draft, he was picked 10th overall in the NBA D-League Draft by the Rio Grande Valley Vipers. Summers played in Slovakia in the 2016–17 season. In August 2017, he was selected in the 7th round of the G League expansion draft by the Wisconsin Herd.

In 2019, Summers played for the team Red Baron in Malaysia. On March 7, 2020, he signed with the Halcones de Ciudad Obregón of the Circuito de Baloncesto de la Costa del Pacífico (CIBACOPA).

Summers returned to Halcones de Ciudad Obregón for the 2022 CIBACOPA season. He earned All-Star honors.

In September 2022, Summers joined Mineros de Zacatecas of the Liga Nacional de Baloncesto Profesional (LNBP).
