= Reginald Becton =

American basketball player (born 1991)

Reginald Becton-Buckner
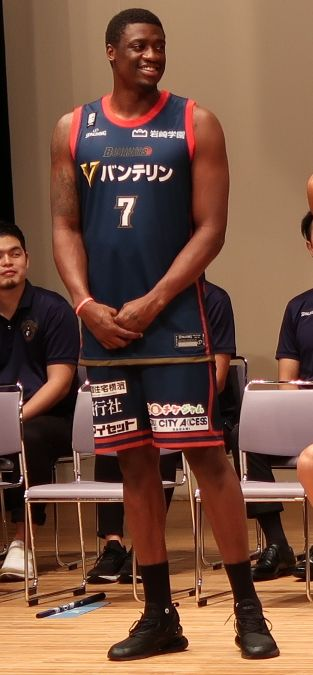

Free agent
- Position: Power forward / center

Personal information
- Born: May 12, 1991 (age 35) Memphis, Tennessee, US
- Listed height: 6 ft 9 in (2.06 m)
- Listed weight: 210 lb (95 kg)

Career information
- High school: Manassas (Memphis, Tennessee)
- College: Ole Miss (2009–2013)
- NBA draft: 2013: undrafted
- Playing career: 2013–present

Career history
- 2013–2014: Iowa Energy
- 2014: Maratonistas de Coamo
- 2014–2015: Soles de Mexicali
- 2015–2016: Maccabi Haifa
- 2016–2017: Hapoel Eilat
- 2017: Cariduros de Fajardo
- 2017–2018: Maccabi Haifa
- 2018: Cariduros de Fajardo
- 2019: Capitanes de Arecibo
- 2019–2022: Yokohama B-Corsairs
- 2022-2023: Earthfriends Tokyo Z
- 2023: Santos de San Luis

Career highlights
- Israeli League Blocks Leader (2018); 3× SEC All-Defensive Team (2011–2013); SEC All-Freshman Team (2010); Tennessee Mr. Basketball (2009)

Reginald Becton-Buckner (born May 12, 1991) is an American professional basketball player. He played college basketball for the University of Mississippi where he starred in his four seasons with the Ole Miss Rebels. Becton is Ole Miss all-time blocked shot leader and as of 2013 ranks fifth in SEC with 326 career blocked shots.

== Professional career ==
=== Early years (2013–2014) ===
Following graduating from Ole Miss, Becton was drafted by the Erie BayHawks, Santa Cruz Warriors, and finally playing for the Iowa Energy of the NBA Development League.

=== Puerto Rico and Mexico (2014–2015) ===
After the Iowa Energy released him in the 2013–14 season, Becton played in both Puerto Rico and Mexico.

=== Israel Turkey and Puerto Rico (2015–2019) ===
On August 31, 2015, Becton signed a deal with Maccabi Haifa of the Israeli Basketball Premier League.

On August 9, 2016, Becton signed with Hapoel Eilat for the 2016–17 season.

On October 28, 2017, Becton returned to Maccabi Haifa for a second stint, signing a one-year deal. In 24 games played during the 2017–18 season, Becton led the Israeli League in blocks (1.5 per game) and also averaged 9.9 points and 5.9 rebounds per game.

On May 31, 2018, Becton joined his former team Cariduros de Fajardo of the Baloncesto Superior Nacional.

2018–19 Season. Becton signed with Mamak Belediye Yeni Mamak Spor of Turkish Basketball First League.

=== Japan (2019–2023) ===
On September 7, 2019, Becton joined Yokohama B-Corsairs of the Japanese professional basketball B1 league.

On October 19, 2022, Becton joined Earthfriends Tokyo Z of the Japanese professional basketball B2 league.
