= Sean Tuohy =

American sports commentator and restaurateur

Personal information
- Born: November 23, 1959 (age 66) New Orleans, Louisiana, U. S.
- Listed height: 6 ft 1 in (1.85 m)
- Listed weight: 190 lb (86 kg)

Career information
- High school: Isidore Newman (New Orleans, Louisiana)
- College: Ole Miss (1978–1982)
- NBA draft: 1982: 10th round, 218th overall pick
- Drafted by: New Jersey Nets
- Position: Point guard

Career highlights
- Second-team All-SEC (1980); Third-team All-SEC (1981); SEC all-time leader in assists
- Stats at Basketball Reference

Sean Albro Tuohy (born November 23, 1959) is an American sports commentator and restaurateur. He played college basketball at the University of Mississippi in the 1980s.

Tuohy, his wife Leigh Anne, and his family are a subject of Michael Lewis' 2006 book, The Blind Side: Evolution of a Game, and its 2009 feature film adaptation, The Blind Side, where he is portrayed by Tim McGraw. The book and subsequent film are based on the Tuohys' alleged “raising” of National Football League (NFL) player Michael Oher, who played in the NFL from 2009 to 2016.

== Early life ==
Tuohy (Irish: Ó Tuathaigh) is of Irish descent and was raised Catholic. Tuohy is the son of Mida (Michell) and Edward "Skeets" Tuohy, a basketball coach at the Isidore Newman School, in New Orleans, Louisiana, where the Tuohy Gymnasium is named in his honor. Tuohy graduated from Newman. Out of high school, Tuohy was drafted by the Cincinnati Reds to play baseball, but turned down the offer to attend college. With sports as his "meal ticket" through high school and college, Tuohy left New Orleans for the University of Mississippi on a basketball scholarship.

=== College ===
Tuohy attended the University of Mississippi where he was a member of the Mississippi Alpha chapter of the Phi Delta Theta fraternity, played basketball, and also met his future wife Leigh Anne.

Tuohy led the Ole Miss Rebels to their first SEC men's basketball tournament championship in 1981. As a player at Ole Miss, Tuohy was named All-SEC in each of his four seasons. He was named to the All-Century SEC team and is the only basketball player in the history of the SEC to lead a statistical category for four years, as he did with assists. Tuohy holds the record for single season assists in the Southeastern Conference with 260. Tuohy is only the fourth basketball player ever chosen to the Ole Miss Sports Hall of Fame. Drafted by the NBA's New Jersey Nets with the 218th pick (Round 10) in 1982, he opted to continue his career overseas before returning to the U.S. to be with his father in his final days.

== Career ==
Tuohy and his wife owned 115 fast food franchises, including those of Taco Bell, Kentucky Fried Chicken, Pizza Hut and Long John Silver's, but as of 2019, they own 11 Taco Bells, having sold the majority in six separate transactions.

Tuohy has also been a broadcaster for the Memphis Grizzlies of the NBA since 2001. He has seven years of experience as an analyst for radio broadcasts at Ole Miss, as well as national broadcasts for Westwood One and CBS Radio.

Tuohy and his wife are also the co-authors of the book, In a Heartbeat: Sharing the Power of Cheerful Giving, which was released in 2010.

== Personal life ==
Tuohy married his wife, Leigh Anne, in 1982 and the couple have two children together. They have one son, Sean Jr., who played guard for the Loyola Greyhounds. They claimed to have adopted former NFL player Michael Oher when he was 17. They have one daughter, Collins, who was a state champion as a pole vaulter and cheerleader at the University of Mississippi. Tuohy and his wife live in Memphis, Tennessee.

In August 2023, Oher filed a lawsuit alleging that Tuohy and his wife did not adopt him and had instead tricked him to signing a conservatorship. The Tuohy's confirmed it was a conservatorship. He stated they did not trick Oher. Instead, it was done to ease the NCAA's concerns over Oher wishing to attend the University of Mississippi, a school where the Tuohys were boosters. He called the claims "insulting" but also said despite the allegations made by him, they still love Oher. A judge ended the conservatorship and declined to dismiss the lawsuit in September 2023. The Tuohys later told the court they would remove all mentions to Oher being adopted from their website and public speaking advertisements.
