= S. J. Tuohy =

American college athletics administrator (born 1993)

Current position
- Title: Athletic director
- Team: Louisiana–Monroe
- Conference: Sun Belt

Biographical details
- Born: July 4, 1993 (age 33); Memphis, Tennessee, U.S.
- Education: Loyola University Maryland, Southern Methodist University, Oral Roberts University

Playing career
- 2013–2016: Loyola
- 2016: SMU
- Positions: Guard, Holder

Coaching career (HC unless noted)
- 2017: SMU (ST assistant)

Administrative career (AD unless noted)
- 2018–2020: Arkansas (assistant director of football operations)
- 2020–2021: Liberty (assistant AD)
- 2021–2023: UCF (associate AD)
- 2023–2024: The Kingdom NIL (executive director)
- 2024–2025: Oral Roberts (deputy AD)
- 2025–present: Louisiana–Monroe

Sean Albro Tuohy Jr. (born July 4, 1993) is an American college athletics administrator who is currently serving as the director of athletics for the University of Louisiana at Monroe.

== Early life ==
Tuohy was born on July 4, 1993, at Baptist Memorial East Hospital in Memphis, Tennessee to parents Sean Tuohy and Leigh Anne Tuohy. Tuohy's early life was depicted as part of the feature film The Blind Side, in which Tuohy was portrayed by child actor Jae Head.

== College career ==
Tuohy played four years of college basketball as a guard at Loyola University Maryland from 2013 to 2016. After graduating from Loyola, Tuohy transferred to Southern Methodist University, where he played one year of college football as a graduate transfer in 2016. Tuohy played on the SMU Mustangs special teams units, serving as the holder on kick attempts.

== Administrative career ==
After serving one season as a special teams assistant coach at Southern Methodist University in 2017, Tuohy served as an assistant director of football operations at the University of Arkansas from 2018 to 2020, as an assistant athletic director at Liberty University from 2020 to 2021, as an associate athletic director at the University of Central Florida from 2021 to 2023, as the executive director of The Kingdom NIL (the University of Central Florida's NIL collective) from 2023 to 2024, and as a deputy athletic director at Oral Roberts University from 2024 to 2025. Tuohy was named athletic director at the University of Louisiana at Monroe on November 28, 2025.
