= The Blind Side (film) =

2009 film by John Lee Hancock

- Theatrical release poster
- Directed by: John Lee Hancock
- Screenplay by: John Lee Hancock
- Based on: The Blind Side: Evolution of a Game by Michael Lewis
- Produced by: Broderick Johnson; Andrew Kosove; Gil Netter
- Starring: Sandra Bullock; Tim McGraw; Quinton Aaron; Kathy Bates
- Cinematography: Alar Kivilo
- Edited by: Mark Livolsi
- Music by: Carter Burwell
- Production company: Alcon Entertainment
- Distributed by: Warner Bros. Pictures
- Release date: November 20, 2009
- Running time: 128 minutes
- Country: United States
- Language: English
- Budget: $29 million
- Box office: $309 million

The Blind Side is a 2009 American biographical sports drama film written and directed by John Lee Hancock. Based on the 2006 book of the same name by Michael Lewis, the film tells the story of Michael Oher, a football offensive lineman who overcame an impoverished upbringing to play in the National Football League (NFL) with the help of Leigh Anne and Sean Tuohy. It stars Sandra Bullock as Leigh Anne, Tim McGraw as Sean, and Quinton Aaron as Oher.

The film was released by Warner Bros. Pictures on November 20, 2009, and was a commercial success, grossing $309 million on a $29 million budget. Despite mixed reviews from critics, Bullock's performance was universally praised, leading to her winning the Academy Award for Best Actress, the Golden Globe Award for Best Actress in a Motion Picture – Drama, and the Screen Actors Guild Award for Outstanding Performance by a Female Actor in a Leading Role.

The film was the subject of controversy in 2023 when Oher alleged the Tuohys tricked him into signing a conservatorship agreement instead of legally adopting him, which prevented him from receiving royalties while the family indirectly made millions.

== Plot ==
Michael "Big Mike" Oher is a 17-year old who's been in foster care in Tennessee due to his biological mother's drug addiction. Every time he's placed in a new home, he tries to return to her. While living on a friend's couch, his friend's father notices Michael's size and athleticism and arranges for Burt Cotton, the football coach of Wingate Christian School, to enroll Michael despite his poor academic record.

Michael is befriended by a younger student named Sean Tuohy Jr. ("SJ"). SJ's mother, Leigh Anne, is a strong-minded interior designer and the wife of wealthy businessman Sean Sr. Michael receives news that his father has died in an accident. Leigh Anne and Sean notice Michael picking discarded food from the bleachers after a volleyball game. The evening before Thanksgiving, Leigh Anne notices Michael walking alone without adequate clothing. When she learns he plans to spend the night outside the school, she offers him shelter in the Tuohy home and asks him to Thanksgiving dinner with her family.

Leigh Anne unsuccessfully tries to return Michael to his biological mother's house, but it has an eviction notice posted. Michael becomes a member of the Tuohy family. Leigh Anne's friends suggest Collins, Leigh Anne's daughter, might not be safe around Michael. Collins rejects the notion. When Leigh Anne attempts to become Michael's legal guardian, she learns he was taken from his drug-addicted birth mother when he was seven; nobody knows her whereabouts.

Michael scores poorly in a career aptitude test but ranks in the 98th percentile for protective instincts. His grades improve enough to let him play on the school football team. Michael is hesitant to use his strength and size during practice. When Leigh Anne explains that an offensive linemen protect the quarterback, Michael's play improves to college level and the Tuohys hire Miss Sue, a private tutor, to get his grades to the minimum grade point average for college admission.

Leigh Anne locates Michael's mother Denise and asks about adopting him. Michael is heavily recruited by prestigious schools and endorsed by SJ. His grades improve and he opts to attend "Ole Miss". An NCAA official named Granger investigates the Tuohys to see if they influenced him just so he would play for their alma mater. Sean Sr. had played basketball for Ole Miss, and Leigh Ann and Miss Sue had both been cheerleaders. Michael becomes suspicious and confronts Leigh Anne about her motives for taking him in.

Michael finds Denise in Hurt Village and is welcomed back by the local gang. Michael finds their unsophisticated outlook clashes with the life he just left and Michael battles with several of the youths. He returns to the Tuohys and tells Granger he chose Ole Miss because "it's where my family goes to school".

Photos of the real Tuohy family and Michael Oher close the film, showing him at Ole Miss, his selection in the first round of the 2009 NFL draft by the Baltimore Ravens, and his career in the National Football League.

== Cast ==
- Sandra Bullock as Leigh Anne Tuohy, Michael's adoptive mother
- Tim McGraw as Sean Tuohy, Michael's adoptive father
- Quinton Aaron as Michael Oher
  - Brandon Rivers as Young Mike
- Kathy Bates as Miss Sue
- Jae Head as Sean "S.J." Tuohy Jr., Michael's adoptive younger brother
- Lily Collins as Collins Tuohy, Michael's adoptive younger sister
- Ray McKinnon as Coach Cotton
- Kim Dickens as Mrs. Boswell
- Adriane Lenox as Denise Oher, Michael's biological mother
- IronE Singleton as Alton, a gang leader/drug dealer
- Sharon Conley as Investigator Granger

Several NCAA Division I Football Bowl Subdivision coaches and recruiters make brief appearances as themselves: Phillip Fulmer, Lou Holtz, Tom Lemming, Houston Nutt, Ed Orgeron, Pepper Rodgers, Nick Saban, and Tommy Tuberville. Oher's coach from high school, Hugh Freeze, has an uncredited cameo as a coach watching game film.

== Production ==
The Blind Side was produced by Alcon Entertainment and released by Warner Bros. Pictures. The film's production budget was $29 million. Filming for the school scenes took place at Atlanta International School and The Westminster Schools in Atlanta, Georgia, and it features many of their students as extras. The film premiered on November 17 in New York City and New Orleans, and opened in theaters in the rest of the United States and in Canada on November 20.

The starring role was originally written for Julia Roberts, but she turned it down. Bullock initially turned down the starring role three times due to discomfort with portraying a devout Christian. By her own account, Bullock felt she could not objectively represent such a person's beliefs on screen. But after a visit with the real Leigh Anne Tuohy, Bullock not only won the role, but also took a pay cut and agreed to receive a percentage of the profits instead.

== Release ==
=== Home media ===
The Blind Side was released on DVD and Blu-ray on March 23, 2010. It was available exclusively for rental from Blockbuster for 28 days.

Redbox and Netflix customers had to wait 28 days before they were able to rent the movie. This stems from the settlement of a lawsuit brought by Redbox against Warner Home Video, who, in an attempt to boost DVD sales, refused to sell wholesale titles to Redbox. On August 19, 2009, Redbox sued Warner Home Video to continue purchasing DVD titles at wholesale prices. On February 16, 2010, Redbox settled the lawsuit and agreed to a 28-day window past the street date.

As of July 9, 2013, units sold for the DVD stand at more than 8.4 million copies and it has grossed a further $107,962,159 adding to its total gross. The Blu-ray was reissued as part of the Best of Warner Bros. 50 Film Collection in 2013. There was also a release of this Limited Edition set issued on DVD.

== Reception ==
=== Box office ===
The Blind Side opened in second place behind The Twilight Saga: New Moon, earning $34.5 million during its opening weekend. It was the highest-grossing opening weekend of Sandra Bullock's career. The movie enjoyed a rare greater success for the second weekend, taking in an estimated $40 million ranking again in second place to New Moon. During its third weekend, The Blind Side moved up to first place, earning $20.4 million due to strong word-of-mouth. In its fourth weekend, it moved down to second place, earning an estimated $15.5 million.

By January 2010, the film had earned $200 million domestically, becoming an all-time career high for an actress whose sole name appears above the title. By June 2010, the film ended its domestic theatrical run, earning a total of nearly $256 million. In the United Kingdom and Ireland, the film was released on March 26, 2010. It was the third biggest release of that weekend behind Nanny McPhee and the Big Bang and Tim Burton's Alice in Wonderland.

The Blind Side has also become the highest grossing football film and sports drama of all time domestically, unadjusted for ticket inflation.

=== Critical response ===
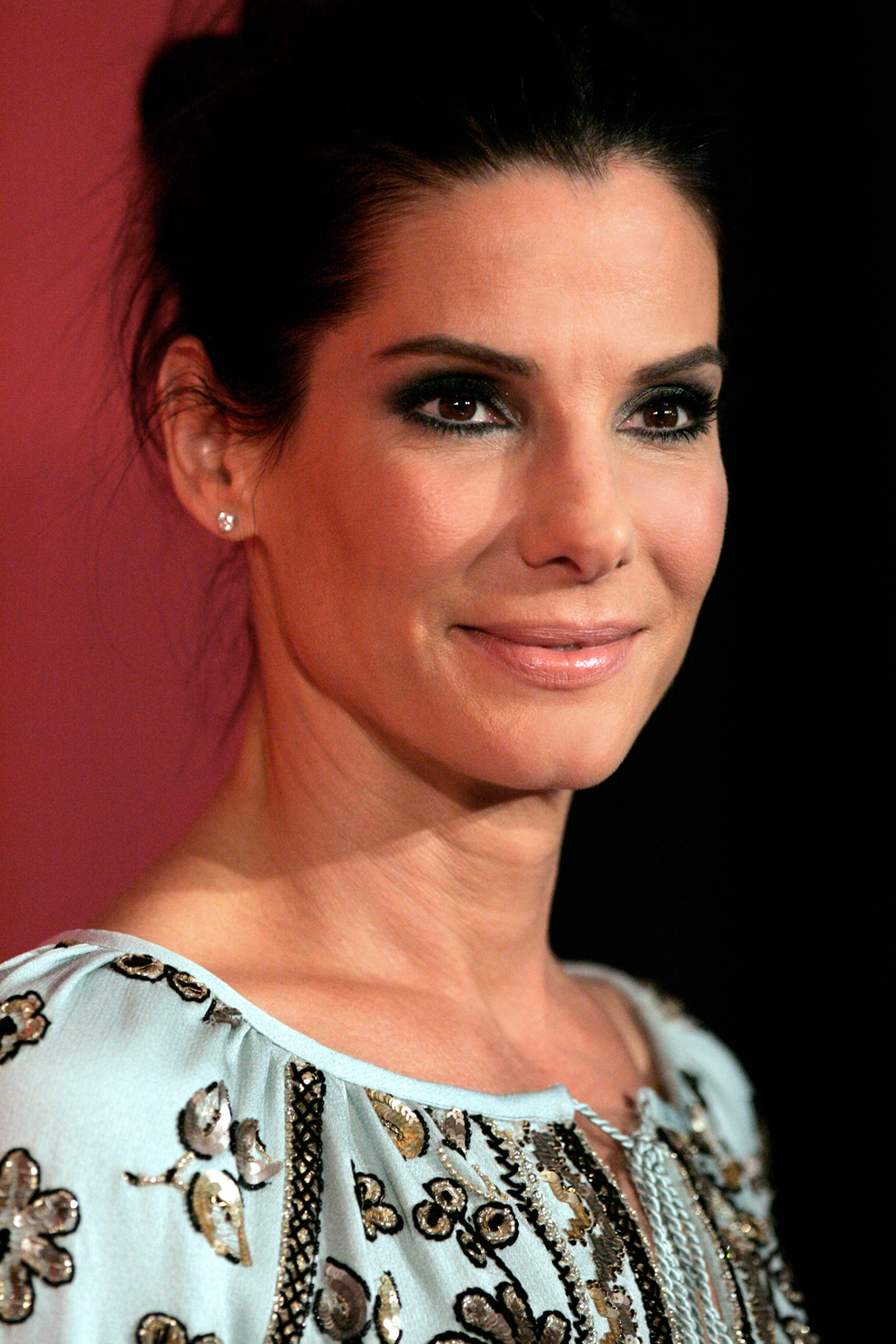
Sandra Bullock garnered universal acclaim for her performance and won the Academy Award for Best Actress.

Sandra Bullock's performance in The Blind Side received enormous critical praise. Review aggregation website Rotten Tomatoes gives the film a rating of 66%, based on 204 reviews, with an average rating of 6.3/10. The site's critical consensus reads, "It might strike some viewers as a little too pat, but The Blind Side has the benefit of strong source material and a strong performance from Sandra Bullock." Metacritic, which assigned a score of 53 out of 100, based on reviews from 29 critics, indicating "mixed or average reviews". Audiences polled by CinemaScore gave the film a rare "A+" grade.

A. O. Scott of The New York Times commented on the performances: "Ms. Bullock is convincing enough as an energetic, multitasking woman of the New South, who knows her own mind and usually gets her own way. And Tim McGraw, as Leigh Anne's affable husband, Sean, inhabits his character comfortably and knows how to get out of Ms. Bullock's way when necessary." He found the movie to be "made up almost entirely of turning points and yet curiously devoid of drama or suspense" and called it a "live-action, reality-based version of a Disney cartoon: it's the heartwarming tale of a foundling taken in by strangers, who accept him even though he's different and treat him as one of their own."

According to Michael Rechtshaffen of The Hollywood Reporter, Bullock's character is an "irrepressible hoot in writer-director John Lee Hancock's otherwise thoroughly conventional take on Michael Lewis' fact-based book". In spite of her "feisty" and "energetic" performance, he felt that there was a lack of development concerning Michael's character: "Not until the end of the film do we ever get a chance to really see what's going on in Oher's head—how he feels about being the chosen one plucked from the poverty-stricken projects of Memphis and thrown into this protected, nonliberal-leaning environment of privilege." Peter Bradshaw of The Guardian described Bullock's appearance as "strangely humourless" and felt that "there is something weirdly absent about this performance." Overall, he opined that the film provided "a Photoshopped image of reality that is bland, parochial, and stereotypically acted," and concluded: "There is a rich, complex story to be told about Michael Oher, and his mentor, Leigh Anne Tuohy. But this waxwork parade isn't it."

The film has been criticized for perpetuating the "white savior" trope. Jeffrey Montez de Oca of the University of Colorado-Colorado Springs writes that in The Blind Side's portrayal of adoption, "charity operates as a signifying act of whiteness that obscures the social relations of domination that not only make charity possible but also creates an urban underclass in need of charity." Melissa Anderson of the Dallas Observer argues that the "mute, docile" portrayal of Oher effectively endorses the Uncle Tom stereotype of African-American submission to white authority. In her book, White Fragility, Robin DiAngelo criticized The Blind Side's perpetuation of "negative racial stereotypes", calling it "fundamentally and insidiously anti-black". She refers to a scene in which Oher returns to his stereotypically violent former neighborhood, only leaving when Tuohy rescues him from it. She also argues that the film portrays Oher as a simpleton who uses instinct over intellect, as a psychological test concludes that Oher has little "ability to learn" but much "protective instinct" (a scientifically nonsensical statement, according to DiAngelo).

Michael Oher has also voiced his displeasure with the movie and takes particular exception to its portrayal of his intelligence. In his 2012 book, I Beat the Odds: From Homelessness, to the Blind Side, and Beyond, Oher wrote, "I felt like it [the movie] portrayed me as dumb instead of as a kid who had never had consistent academic instruction and ended up thriving once he got it." The film's claim that he didn't understand football was another point of irritation for Oher. When talking about watching his adoptive family teach him he said, "No, that's not me at all! I've been studying—really studying—the game since I was a kid!" Despite his displeasure with his portrayal in the movie Oher has stated that he likes the film's message of perseverance and the general treatment of the Tuohy family and has been quoted as saying, "It's a great story. It seems like they helped me to get to this point. They're my family and without them I wouldn't be here," and "They taught me a lot of things, showed me a lot of different things. It shows that if you help somebody and give somebody a chance and don't judge people, look where they can get to."

=== Accolades ===
Award	Category	Nominee(s)	Result	Ref.
Academy Awards	Best Picture	Gil Netter, Andrew A. Kosove, and Broderick Johnson	Nominated	
Academy Awards	Best Actress	Sandra Bullock	Won	
ASCAP Film and Television Music Awards	Top Box Office Films	Carter Burwell (Note: Also for Where the Wild Things Are.)	Won	
BET Awards	Best Movie		Nominated	
BET Awards	Best Actor	Quinton Aaron	Nominated	
Black Reel Awards	Best Film		Nominated	
Black Reel Awards	Best Actor	Quinton Aaron	Nominated	
Black Reel Awards	Best Screenplay, Original or Adapted	John Lee Hancock	Nominated	
Black Reel Awards	Best Breakthrough Performance	Quinton Aaron	Nominated	
Critics' Choice Movie Awards	Best Actress	Sandra Bullock	Won (Note: Tied with Meryl Streep for Julie & Julia.)	
Critics' Choice Movie Awards	Best Young Actor/Actress	Jae Head	Nominated	
Dallas–Fort Worth Film Critics Association Awards	Best Actress	Sandra Bullock	5th Place	
Denver Film Critics Society Awards	Best Actress	Sandra Bullock	Nominated	
ESPY Awards	Best Sports Movie	John Lee Hancock	Won	
Gold Derby Awards	Best Lead Actress	Sandra Bullock	Nominated	
Golden Globe Awards	Best Actress in a Motion Picture – Drama	Sandra Bullock	Won	
Hollywood Post Alliance Awards	Outstanding Editing – Feature Film	Mark Livolsi	Nominated	
Houston Film Critics Society Awards	Best Actress	Sandra Bullock	Nominated	
Movieguide Awards	Best Movie for Mature Audiences		Won	
Movieguide Awards	Epiphany Prize for Inspiring Movies		Won	
MTV Movie Awards	Best Female Performance	Sandra Bullock	Nominated	
MTV Movie Awards	Best Breakout Star	Quinton Aaron	Nominated	
NAACP Image Awards	Outstanding Motion Picture		Nominated	
NAACP Image Awards	Outstanding Actor in a Motion Picture	Quinton Aaron	Nominated	
NAACP Image Awards	Outstanding Actress in a Motion Picture	Sandra Bullock	Nominated	
NAACP Image Awards	Outstanding Writing in a Motion Picture	John Lee Hancock	Nominated	
Nickelodeon Kids' Choice Awards	Favorite Movie Actress	Sandra Bullock	Nominated	
Online Film & Television Association Awards	Best Actress	Sandra Bullock	Nominated	
People's Choice Awards	Favorite Movie Actress	Sandra Bullock	Won	
Phoenix Film Critics Society Awards	Best Performance by a Youth – Male	Jae Head	Won	
San Diego Film Critics Society Awards	Best Actress	Sandra Bullock	Nominated	
Screen Actors Guild Awards	Outstanding Performance by a Female Actor in a Leading Role	Sandra Bullock	Won	
Teen Choice Awards	Choice Movie: Drama		Won	
Teen Choice Awards	Choice Movie Actress: Drama	Sandra Bullock	Won	
Teen Choice Awards	Choice Movie: Male Breakout Star	Quinton Aaron	Nominated	
Washington D.C. Area Film Critics Association Awards	Best Actress	Sandra Bullock	Nominated	
Washington D.C. Area Film Critics Association Awards	Best Adapted Screenplay	John Lee Hancock	Nominated	
World Soundtrack Awards	Soundtrack Composer of the Year	Carter Burwell (Note: Also for A Serious Man, Howl, The Kids Are All Right, and Where the Wild Things Are.)	Nominated	
Young Artist Awards	Best Performance in a Feature Film – Supporting Young Actor	Jae Head	Nominated	

==== Best Picture nomination ====
The nomination of The Blind Side for Best Picture was considered a surprise, even to its producers. In an attempt to revitalize interest, the Academy of Motion Picture Arts and Sciences had upped the number of Best Picture nominees from a mandatory number of five to ten in time for the 82nd Academy Awards, the year The Blind Side was nominated. However, in 2011, the academy changed the policy, stating that the Best Picture category would feature from five to ten nominees depending on voting results, as opposed to a set number of nominees. The change was interpreted as a response to films like The Blind Side being nominated for Best Picture to fill up the set number of spots.

== Legal dispute ==
In August 2023, Oher filed a lawsuit alleging that Leigh Ann and Sean Tuohy never actually adopted him, but instead created a conservatorship which gave them legal authority to make business deals in his name. He alleged that the Tuohys used their power as conservators to strike a deal that paid them and their two children millions of dollars in royalties from The Blind Side while Oher received nothing. SJ Tuohy, the biological son of the Tuohy family, claims to have received "$60,000–$70,000 over the course of the last four or five years."

The producers of The Blind Side, Broderick Johnson and Andrew Kosove denied the family was paid millions. However, the Tuohys were paid $700,000 after taxes, as well as the company's production company Alcon Entertainment making a charitable contribution to the Tuohy Family Foundation. They offered to donate an equal amount to a charity of Oher's choosing, which Oher declined.

Author Michael Lewis also denied millions were made, claiming Twentieth Century Fox paid $250,000 for the option to make the film, split 50–50 with the Tuohy family. According to Lewis, Oher also inexplicably declined his royalty checks adding, "They showered him with resources and love. That he's suspicious of them is breathtaking. The state of mind one has to be in to do that – I feel sad for him." In August 2024, The New York Times Magazine criticized Lewis for attributing Oher's lawsuit to CTE without evidence and promoting a white savior narrative, despite Oher already achieving high school football and academic success before meeting the Tuohys.

Oher's legal action asked the court to end the Tuohys' conservatorship and issue an injunction barring them from using his name and likeness or referring to themselves as his adopted family. It also asked for a full accounting of the money the Tuohys earned using Oher's name, to be paid his share of profits, and other compensatory and punitive damages. The lawyer representing the Tuohys released a statement regarding Oher's remarks, describing them as "hurtful and absurd", and alleging that Oher had threatened to "plant a negative story about them in the press unless they paid him $15 million", but did not deny that they misrepresented adopting Oher.

"The biggest for me was being portrayed as not being able to read or write. When you go into a locker room and your teammates don't think you can learn a playbook, that weighs heavy."

— Michael Oher

On September 29, 2023, the judge terminated the conservatorship, which the Tuohys had said "they were happy to end" after the court order. The Tuohys were also ordered to remove all mentions to Oher being adopted from their website and public speaking advertisements. In Oher's lawsuit, it is alleged the Tuohys made between $30,000 to $50,000 off motivational speaking engagements using Oher's name, image, and likeness.

== Soundtrack ==
The film features 23 songs by artists including Les Paul, Young MC, Lucy Woodward, the Books, Canned Heat, Five for Fighting, and the film's co-star Tim McGraw. However, when the score soundtrack by Carter Burwell was released on CD, none of the featured songs were included.

== See also ==
- List of American football films
- Radio (2003 film)
