= The Blind Side: Evolution of a Game =

2006 book by Michael Lewis

The Blind Side Evolution of a Game
- Author: Michael Lewis
- Language: English
- Subject: American football
- Genre: Non-fiction
- Publisher: W. W. Norton & Company
- Publication date: September 2, 2006
- Publication place: United States
- Pages: 352
- ISBN: 0-393-06123-X

The Blind Side: Evolution of a Game is a book by Michael Lewis released on September 2, 2006, by W. W. Norton & Company. It focuses on American football.

== Contents ==
The book is an examination of how offensive football strategy has evolved over the past three decades in two key ways: the development of the West Coast offense by Bill Walsh first at the Cincinnati Bengals and later at the San Francisco 49ers to great acclaim, and the 1981 arrival of linebacker Lawrence Taylor to the New York Giants. The increased use of the pass and the introduction of a particularly lethal pass-rusher placed an increased importance on the role of the offensive left tackle. Most quarterbacks are right-handed and in order to throw, they stand with their left shoulder facing down field. Thus, they turn their backs to linebackers and other defenders pass rushing from the left side, creating a vulnerable "blind side" that the left tackle must protect. Taylor's speed and power changed the role of outside linebacker to become a more attacking, aggressive position. This in turn caused teams to emphasize larger and more agile left tackles. When free agency was first implemented in the NFL, this new importance of the offensive line and particularly the left tackle rose to prominence with the largest increase in wages amongst all positions, with particular study of Steve Wallace and Will Wolford.

The book also features Michael Oher, the former left tackle for the Ole Miss football team, and later right tackle for the Baltimore Ravens. Lewis follows Oher from his impoverished upbringing through his years at Briarcrest Christian School, his purported adoption by Sean (Michael Lewis's former schoolmate) and Leigh Anne Tuohy and on to his position as one of the most highly coveted prospects in college football.

== Film adaptation ==
The 2009 film The Blind Side was directed by John Lee Hancock and primarily follows the story of Michael Oher. It stars Quinton Aaron as Oher, along with Sandra Bullock, Tim McGraw, and Kathy Bates. It also features appearances by several past and present college football coaches playing themselves.

Bullock would go on to win Best Actress at the 82nd Academy Awards for her portrayal of Leigh Ann Tuohy. The film was also nominated for Best Picture.
