= List of Major League Baseball career games played as a center fielder leaders =

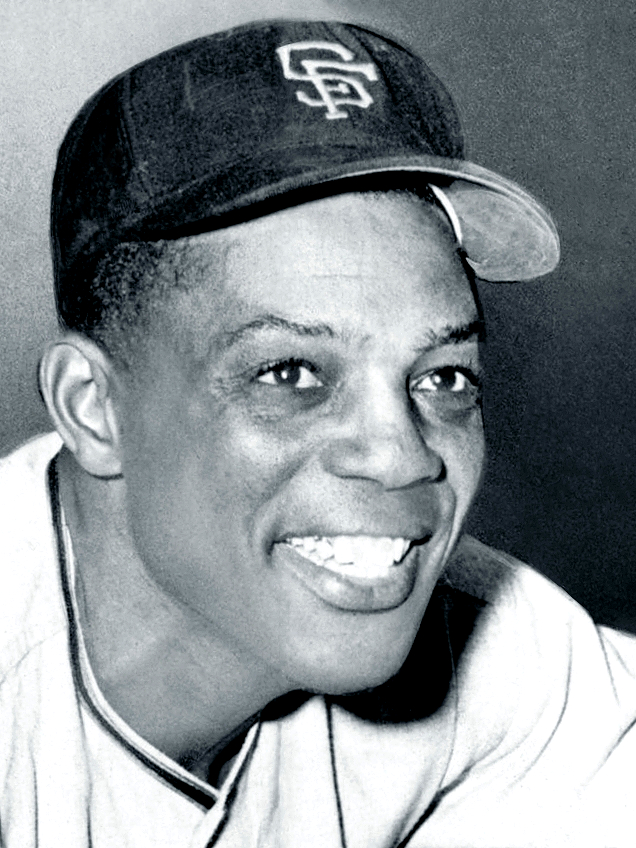
Willie Mays, the all-time leader in games played as a center fielder

Games played (most often abbreviated as G or GP) is a statistic used in team sports to indicate the total number of games in which a player has participated (in any capacity); the statistic is generally applied irrespective of whatever portion of the game is contested. In baseball, the statistic applies also to players who, prior to a game, are included on a starting lineup card or are announced as ex ante substitutes, whether or not they play; however, in Major League Baseball, the application of this statistic does not extend to consecutive games played streaks. A starting pitcher, then, may be credited with a game played even if he is not credited with a game started or an inning pitched. The center fielder (CF) is one of the three outfielders, the defensive positions in baseball farthest from the batter. Center field is the area of the outfield directly in front of a person standing at home plate and facing beyond the pitcher's mound. The outfielders' duty is to try to catch long fly balls before they hit the ground or to quickly catch or retrieve and return to the infield any other balls entering the outfield. Generally having the most territory to cover, the center fielder is usually the fastest of the three outfielders, although this can also depend on the relative strength of their throwing arms and the configuration of their home field, due to the deepest part of center field being the farthest point from the infield and home plate. The center fielder normally plays behind the shortstop and second baseman, who play in or near the infield; unlike catchers and most infielders (excepting first basemen), who are virtually exclusively right-handed, center fielders can be either right- or left-handed. In the scoring system used to record defensive plays, the center fielder is assigned the number 8.

Because game accounts and box scores often did not distinguish between the outfield positions, there has been some difficulty in determining precise defensive statistics prior to 1901; because of this, and because of the similarity in their roles, defensive statistics for the three positions are frequently combined. However, efforts to distinguish between the three positions regarding games played during this period and reconstruct the separate totals have been largely successful; players whose totals include pre-1901 games are notated in the table below. Willie Mays is all-time leader in games played as a center fielder with 2,829 games played in his career. Tris Speaker (2,691), Steve Finley (2,314), Willie Davis (2,239), Ty Cobb (2,194), Ken Griffey Jr. (2,145), and Doc Cramer (2,027) are the only other players to appear in over 2,000 games in center field in their careers.

== Key ==
**Rank**	Rank amongst leaders in career games played. A blank field indicates a tie.
**Player (2027 Gs)**	Number of games played during the 2027 Major League Baseball season
**MLB**	Total career games played as a center fielder in Major League Baseball
*	Denotes elected to National Baseball Hall of Fame
†	Denotes total including pre-1901 games
**Bold**	Denotes active player (Note: A player is considered inactive if he has announced his retirement or has not played for a full season.)

== List ==
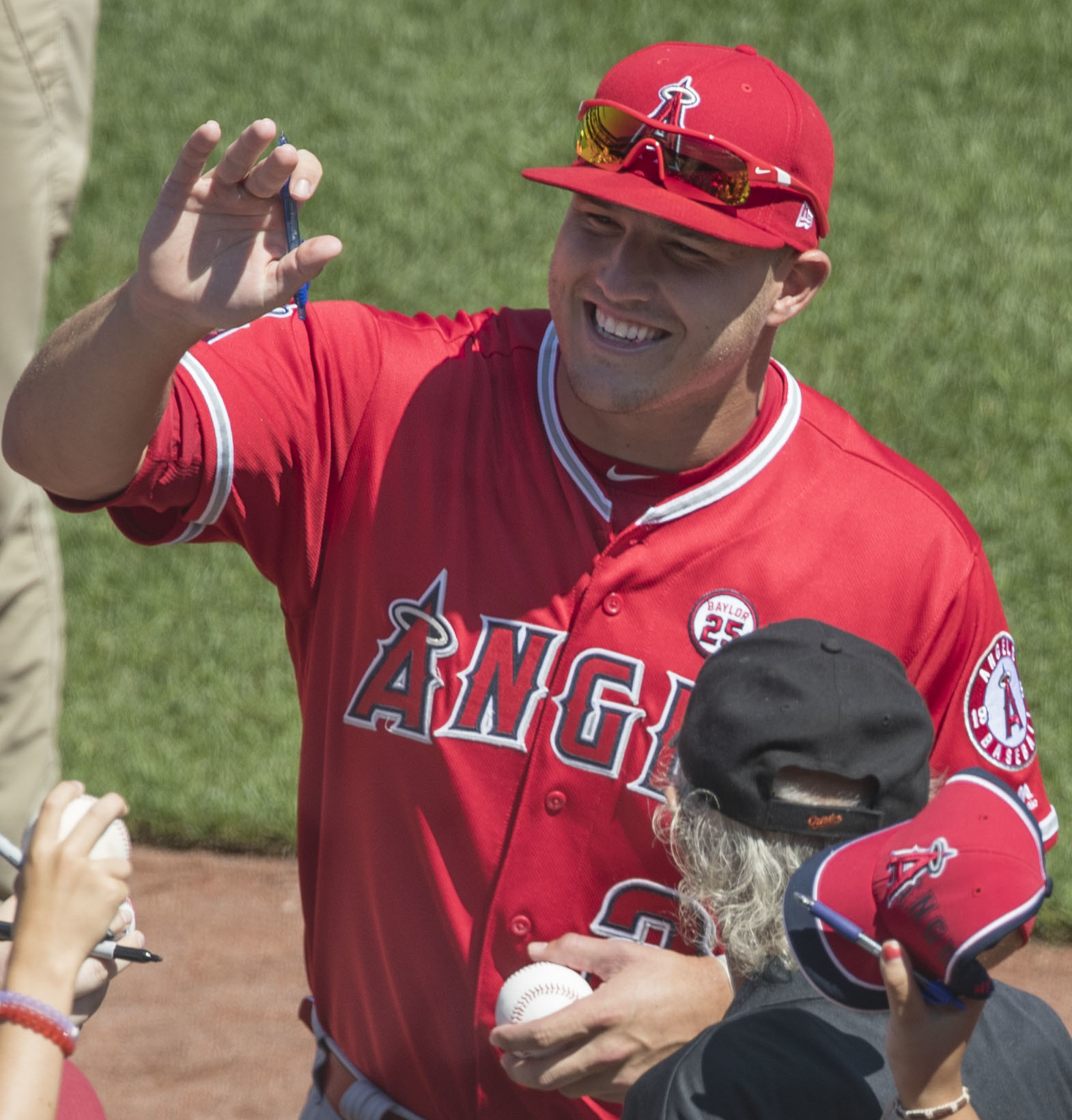
Mike Trout, the active leader and 40th all-time in games played as a center fielder.

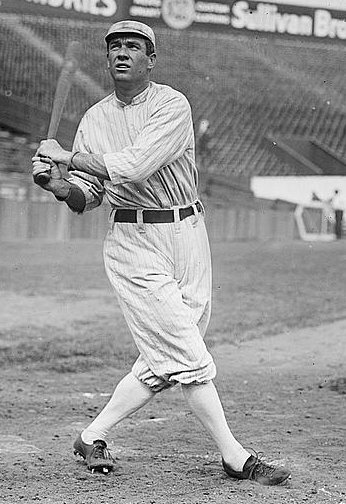
Tris Speaker holds the American League record.

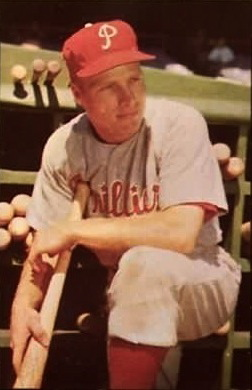
Richie Ashburn played a record 730 consecutive games in center field from 1950 to 1954.

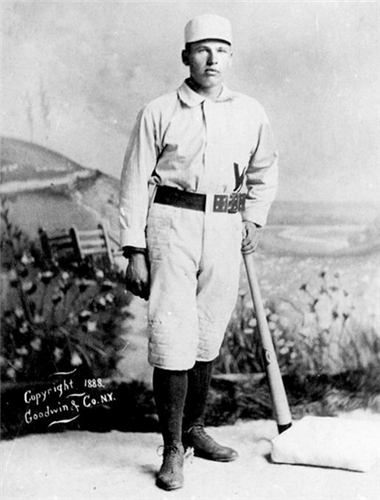
Dummy Hoy held the major league record for 21 years.

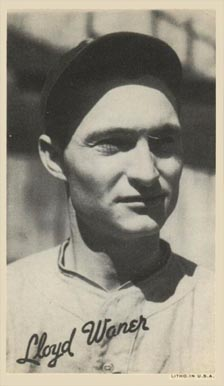
Lloyd Waner held the National League record for 17 years.

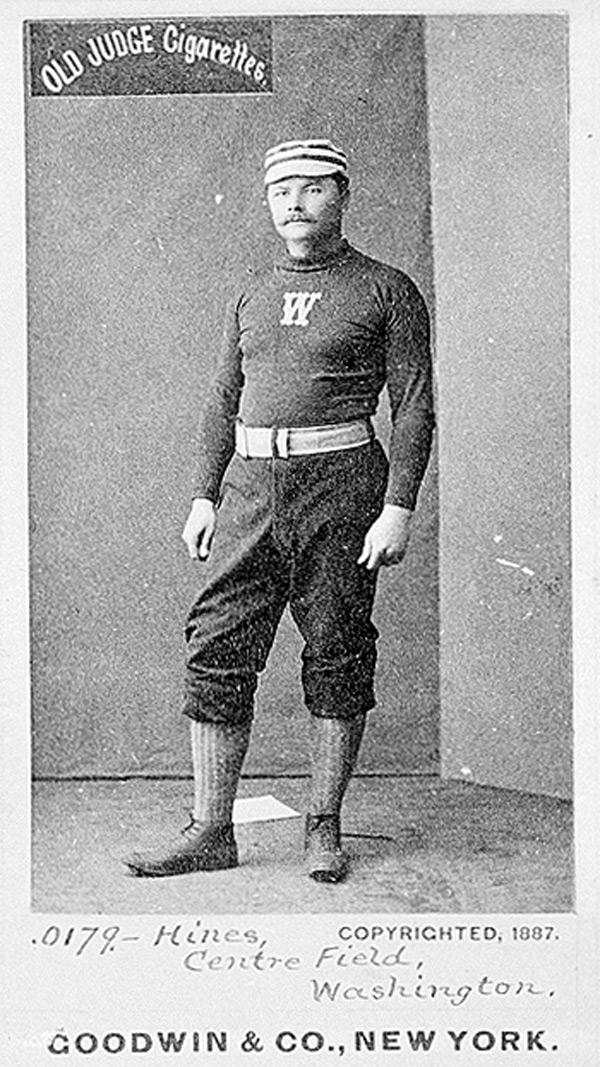
Paul Hines, who was the first player to appear in 1,000 games in center field, held the National League record for 20 years.

- Stats updated as of 2026 season.

Rank	Player (2027 Gs)	Games as a center fielder			Other leagues, notes
Rank	Player (2027 Gs)	MLB	American League	National League	Other leagues, notes
1	Willie Mays*	2,829	0	2,829	
2	Tris Speaker*	2,691	2,691	0	Held major league record, 1920-1971
3	Steve Finley	2,314	171	2,143	
4	Willie Davis	2,239	42	2,197	
5	Ty Cobb*	2,194	2,194	0	
6	Ken Griffey Jr.*	2,145	1,517	628	
7	Doc Cramer	2,027	2,027	0	
8	Brett Butler	1,987	601	1,386	
9	Kenny Lofton	1,984	1,445	539	
10	Richie Ashburn*	1,980	0	1,980	Held National League record, 1959-1965
11	Marquis Grissom	1,967	144	1,823	
12	Bernie Williams	1,856	1,856	0	
13	Amos Otis	1,825	1,792	33	
14	Paul Blair	1,802	1,747	55	
15	Mike Cameron	1,787	899	888	
16	Jim Edmonds	1,768	566	1,202	
17	Edd Roush*	1,754	2	1,605	Includes 147 in Federal League
18	Mickey Mantle*	1,742	1,742	0	
19	Andruw Jones*	1,724	17	1,707	
20	Devon White	1,722	1,114	608	
21	Curt Flood	1,692	10	1,682	
22	Vada Pinson	1,680	182	1,498	
23	Lloyd Waner*	1,660	0	1,660	Held National League record, 1942-1959
24	Garry Maddox	1,658	0	1,658	
25	Joe DiMaggio*	1,634	1,634	0	
26	Clyde Milan	1,631	1,631	0	Held American League record, 1915-1920
27	Max Carey*	1,624	0	1,624	Held National League record, 1926-1942
28	Adam Jones	1,590	1,589	1	
29	Duke Snider*	1,589	0	1,589	
30	Fred Lynn	1,584	1,578	6	
31	Carlos Beltrán*	1,572	751	821	
32	Bill Bruton	1,548	507	1,041	
33	Torii Hunter	1,523	1,523	0	
34	Bill Virdon	1,506	0	1,506	
35	Rick Monday	1,489	607	882	
36	Earl Averill*	1,476	1,473	3	
37	Chet Lemon	1,470	1,470	0	
38	Dode Paskert	1,458	0	1,458	Held National League record, 1920-1926
39	César Cedeño	1,457	0	1,457	
40	**Mike Trout (0)**	1,453	1,453	0	
41	Sam West	1,446	1,446	0	
42	Kirby Puckett*	1,432	1,432	0	
43	Cy Williams	1,372	0	1,372	
44	Vernon Wells	1,369	1,369	0	
45	Willie Wilson	1,357	1,265	92	
46	Willie McGee	1,351	55	1,296	
47	Larry Doby*	1,342	1,330	0	Includes 12 in Negro National League (second) (incomplete)
48	Dom DiMaggio	1,337	1,337	0	
49	**Andrew McCutchen (0)**	1,332	0	1,332	
50	Lance Johnson	1,327	890	437	
51	Lloyd Moseby	1,325	1,325	0	
52	Rick Manning	1,317	1,317	0	
53	Brian McRae	1,307	619	688	
54	Johnny Damon	1,298	1,298	0	
55	Jim Busby	1,265	1,257	8	
56	Curtis Granderson	1,254	1,136	118	
57	Omar Moreno	1,221	188	1,033	
58	Jimmy Piersall	1,212	1,174	38	
59	Lenny Dykstra	1,211	0	1,211	
60	Juan Pierre	1,193	0	1,193	
61	Carlos Gómez	1,191	513	678	
62	Terry Moore	1,185	0	1,185	
63	Jimmy Wynn	1,182	0	1,182	
64	Dwayne Murphy	1,179	1,174	5	
65	Mickey Stanley	1,175	1,175	0	
66	Dexter Fowler	1,170	111	1,059	
67	Michael Bourn	1,159	324	835	
	B.J. Upton	1,159	828	331	
69	Coco Crisp	1,158	1,158	0	
70	Earle Combs*	1,157	1,157	0	
	Dave Henderson	1,157	1,149	8	
72	Aaron Rowand	1,155	456	699	
73	Ginger Beaumont †	1,150	0	1,150	Held National League record, 1910-1920
	Hy Myers	1,150	0	1,150	
	Robin Yount*	1,150	1,150	0	
76	Bill Tuttle	1,146	1,146	0	
77	Mickey Rivers	1,144	1,144	0	
78	Ray Lankford	1,138	0	1,138	
79	Otis Nixon	1,137	632	505	
80	Jim Landis	1,128	1,125	3	
81	Gary Pettis	1,125	1,112	13	
82	Andy Van Slyke	1,119	16	1,103	
83	Del Unser	1,117	541	576	
84	Jacoby Ellsbury	1,105	1,105	0	
85	Mike Kreevich	1,096	1,095	1	
86	Baby Doll Jacobson	1,095	1,095	0	
87	Roy Thomas †	1,082	0	1,082	
88	Cesar Geronimo	1,079	40	1,039	
89	Sam Chapman	1,076	1,076	0	
	Cy Seymour †	1,076	3	1,073	
91	Vince DiMaggio	1,070	0	1,070	
	Denard Span	1,070	449	621	
93	Mookie Wilson	1,067	160	907	
94	Kevin Kiermaier	1,066	1,034	32	
95	Ellis Burks	1,061	722	339	
96	Dale Murphy	1,041	0	1,041	
97	Lorenzo Cain	1,032	634	398	
	Darren Lewis	1,032	476	556	
99	Andre Dawson*	1,027	0	1,027	
100	Fielder Jones †	1,026	1,026	0	Held American League record, 1907-1915

== Other Hall of Famers ==
Player	Games as a center fielder			Other leagues, notes
Player	MLB	American League	National League	Other leagues, notes
Billy Hamilton* †	990	0	990	
Turkey Stearnes*	967	0	0	Includes 615 in Negro National League (first), 176 in Negro National League (second), 133 in Negro American League, 43 in Negro Southern League (incomplete)
Cool Papa Bell*	944	0	0	Includes 632 in Negro National League (first), 257 in Negro National League (second), 39 in East–West League, 16 in Negro American League (incomplete)
Hack Wilson*	913	0	913	
Al Simmons*	775	775	0	
Kiki Cuyler*	691	0	691	
Hugh Duffy* †	680	68	593	Includes 17 in Players' League, 2 in American Association
Sam Rice*	607	607	0	
Oscar Charleston*	585	0	0	Includes 293 in Negro National League (first), 227 in Eastern Colored League, 65 in American Negro League (incomplete)
Al Kaline*	489	489	0	
Sam Crawford* †	446	446	0	
Rickey Henderson*	446	419	27	
