= Andrew McCutchen =

American baseball player (born 1986)

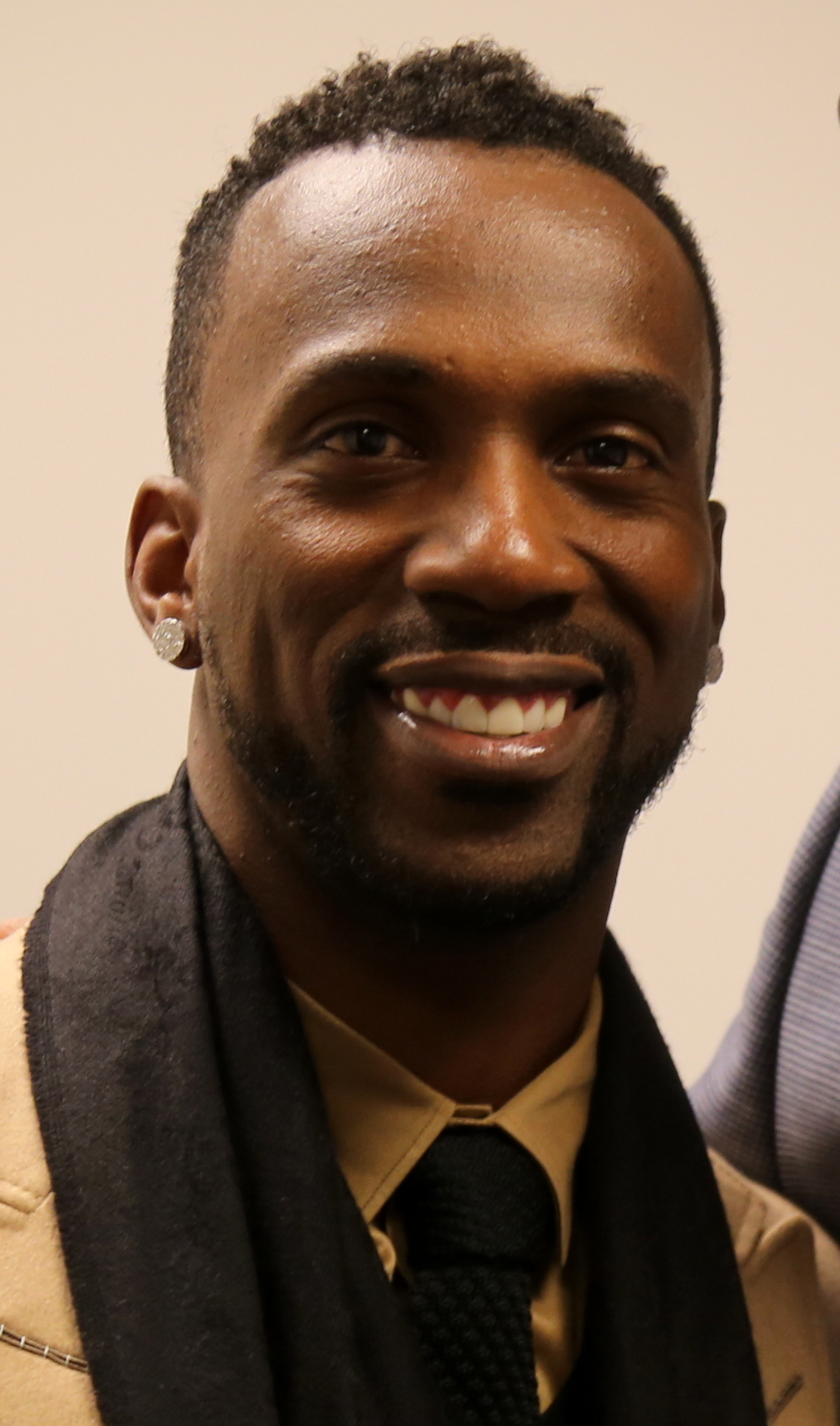
- McCutchen in 2015

Free agent
- Outfielder / Designated hitter
- Born: October 10, 1986 (age 40); Fort Meade, Florida, U.S.
- Bats: Right Throws: Right

MLB debut
- June 4, 2009, for the Pittsburgh Pirates

MLB statistics (through 2026 season)
- Batting average: .271
- Hits: 2,280
- Home runs: 333
- Runs batted in: 1,157
- Stats at Baseball Reference

Teams
- Pittsburgh Pirates (2009–2017); San Francisco Giants (2018); New York Yankees (2018); Philadelphia Phillies (2019–2021); Milwaukee Brewers (2022); Pittsburgh Pirates (2023–2025); Texas Rangers (2026)

Career highlights and awards
- 5× All-Star (2011–2015); NL MVP (2013); Gold Glove Award (2012); 4× Silver Slugger Award (2012–2015); Roberto Clemente Award (2015)
Medals
Men's baseball
Representing United States
World Baseball Classic
Gold medal – first place	2017 Los Angeles	Team

Andrew Stefan McCutchen (born October 10, 1986) is an American professional baseball outfielder and designated hitter who is a free agent. He has previously played in Major League Baseball (MLB) for the Pittsburgh Pirates, San Francisco Giants, New York Yankees, Philadelphia Phillies, Milwaukee Brewers, and Texas Rangers. Internationally, McCutchen represents the United States. In the 2017 World Baseball Classic (WBC), he helped win Team USA's first gold medal in a WBC tournament.

The Pirates selected McCutchen in the first round (11th pick overall) of the 2005 MLB draft, and he made his MLB debut in 2009. During McCutchen's first tenure in Pittsburgh, he was the National League (NL) Most Valuable Player in 2013, a five-time All Star (2011–2015), a four-time Silver Slugger Award winner (2012–2015), a Gold Glove Award winner in 2012, and the Roberto Clemente Award winner in 2015. McCutchen led the NL in hits (194) in 2012, and in on-base percentage (.410), OPS (.952), and extra base hits (69) in 2014.

== Early years ==
McCutchen was born in Fort Meade, Florida, to Lorenzo McCutchen and Petrina Swan, who were high school teenagers at the time. He has a sister, Loren. He lived with his mother while his father attended Carson–Newman University in Jefferson City, Tennessee, where Lorenzo played running back on the football team. Lorenzo gave up his dream of making the National Football League (NFL) to be close to his son and returned to Fort Meade in 1989. Petrina would not marry him unless he became a church minister, which he did. The two married on August 1, 1992.

McCutchen was eligible to play varsity baseball as an eighth grader at Fort Meade High School. He batted .591 as a freshman. McCutchen's average his senior season was .709, as he hit 16 home runs and 42 runs batted in (RBIs). During his varsity career, McCutchen batted .474.

McCutchen also ran track and played football. He was part of a state title-winning 4 × 100 metres relay in his first year of high school. McCutchen was one of the top 200 football recruits in the state of Florida, with his high school position being wide receiver, but opted for a baseball career. He was reportedly offered a full-ride scholarship to the University of Miami to play football.

== Professional career ==
=== Draft and minor leagues ===
McCutchen, who had committed to the University of Florida, was drafted 11th overall by the Pittsburgh Pirates in the first round of the 2005 MLB draft. He signed with the Pirates, receiving a $1.9 million signing bonus, instead of attending Florida. In 2005, he played for the Rookie Gulf Coast League (GCL) Pirates and the Single–A Williamsport Crosscutters, and hit a combined .310/.419 (2nd in the GCL)/.433 with two home runs and 17 stolen bases in 210 at-bats, as he was second in the league with 29 walks, tied for second with 36 runs, third with three triples, and fifth with 13 stolen bases.

Before the 2006 season Baseball America named McCutchen the #50 prospect in the minor leagues. McCutchen played the majority of the season for the Single-A Hickory Crawdads, for whom he started the South Atlantic League (SAL) All-Star team in his first full season as a professional player and was a postseason SAL All-Star. He also played for the Double-A Altoona Curve and batted a combined .294/.359/.450 with 17 home runs and 23 stolen bases in 531 at-bats. At the end of that year, the Pirates named him the organization's Minor League Player of the Year.

Before the 2007 season Baseball America named McCutchen the #13 prospect in the minor leagues, and Baseball Prospectus named him the #15 prospect. He played again for Altoona, as well as for the Triple-A Indianapolis Indians, and hit a combined .265/.329/.388 with 11 home runs and 21 stolen bases in 513 at bats. In 2007 he also played for the Phoenix Desert Dogs, he was on the Arizona Fall League All-Prospect Team and named a Rising Star.

Before the 2008 season Baseball America named him the #14 prospect in the minor leagues, and Baseball Prospectus named him the #24 prospect. In 2008, McCutchen was a mid-season International League (IL) All-Star, an All-Star Futures Game selection, and the Triple-A All-Star Game Top Star. He played the entire season with Indianapolis, and batted .283/.372 (10th in the IL)/.398 with 12 home runs, 68 walks (3rd in the league), 34 stolen bases (7th), and 145 hits (9th), in 512 at-bats.

Before the 2009 season Baseball America named McCutchen the #33 prospect in the minor leagues, and Baseball Prospectus named him the #25 prospect. He again played for Indianapolis, but played only 49 games for them, as he batted .303/.361/.493 with 4 home runs and 17 stolen bases in 201 at-bats.

=== Pittsburgh Pirates (2009–2017) ===
==== 2009 ====
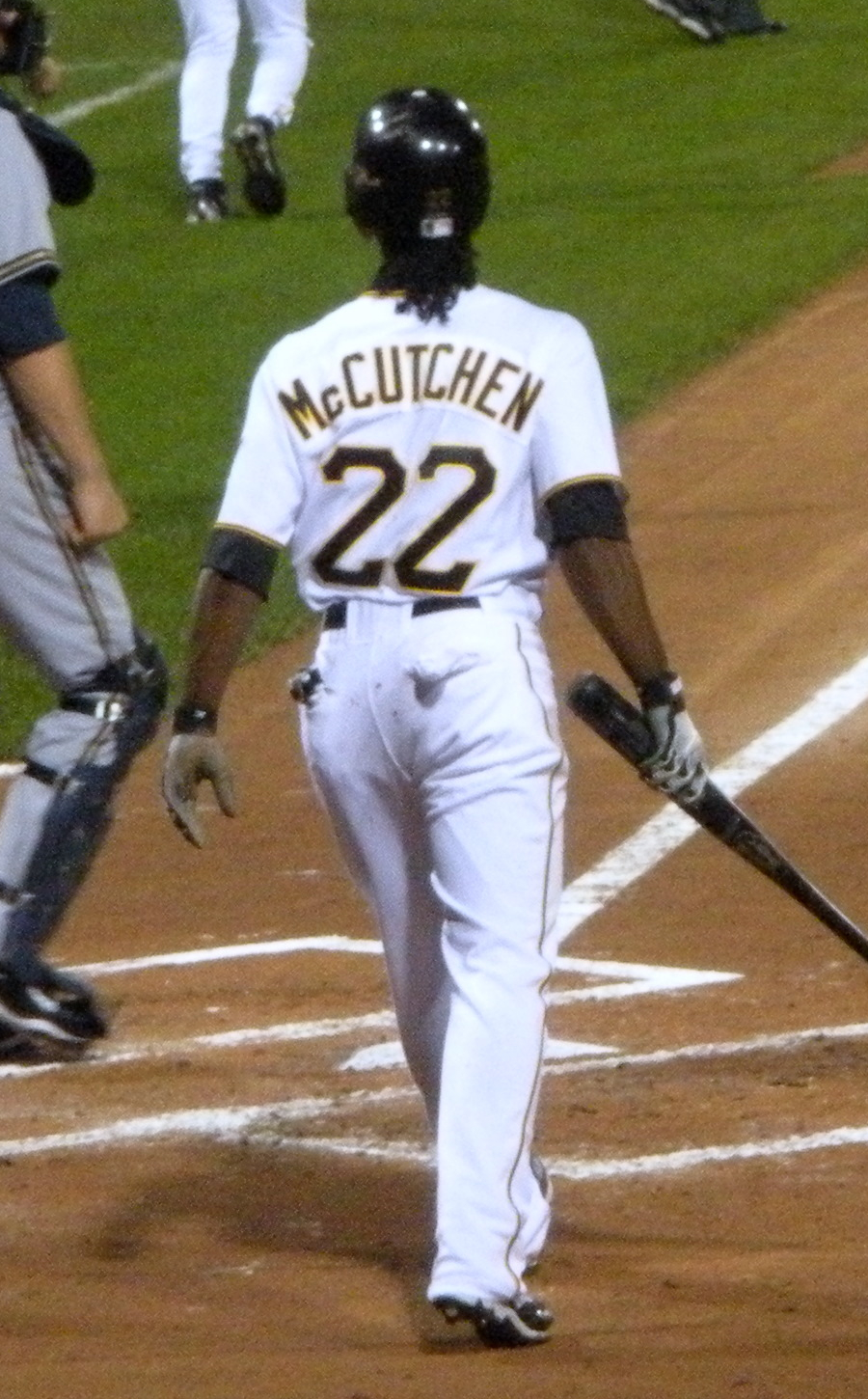
McCutchen in 2009

On June 3, 2009, after the Pittsburgh Pirates traded starting center fielder Nate McLouth to the Atlanta Braves, McCutchen was called up to MLB for the first time. He made his MLB debut the next day, playing center field and batting leadoff against the New York Mets. He singled in his first career at-bat, off starter Mike Pelfrey. McCutchen ended the day with two singles, one RBI, three runs scored, and a stolen base in four at-bats. He recorded his first career four-hit game five days later, against McLouth and the Braves. Two of his hits were triples, making him the first Pirate with two triples in a game since Tike Redman accomplished the feat in 2003.

On June 17, McCutchen hit his first MLB career home run off of Francisco Liriano of the Minnesota Twins. On June 25, he had his first MLB career walk-off hit, off Cleveland Indians closer Matt Herges. "He's an impressive-looking young player. He really is," said Indians manager Eric Wedge.

On August 1, against the Washington Nationals, McCutchen went 4-for-5, with three home runs and six RBIs. He became the 10th Pirates player ever to hit three home runs in a single game, and the first one to do it during his rookie year. Ten days later against the Colorado Rockies at Coors Field, he stole a career-high three bases in a game off three different Rockies pitchers. McCutchen hit his first walk-off home run on August 25, off Brad Lidge of the Philadelphia Phillies.

McCutchen finished his rookie season batting .286/.365/.471, with nine triples (sixth in the National League), an 81.48 stolen base percentage (6th), 12 home runs, 54 RBIs, and 22 stolen bases in 108 games. On defense, he had 10 assists (third among NL center fielders), and a 2.53 range factor/game (4th).

McCutchen finished fourth in the voting for the National League Rookie of the Year Award, behind Chris Coghlan, J. A. Happ, and Tommy Hanson. He was named the Baseball America Rookie of the Year for 2009.

==== 2010 ====
McCutchen began the 2010 season as the Pirates' everyday center fielder. "He's an All-Star. This year, probably," said Atlanta Braves manager Bobby Cox; "Hitting. Running. Defense. Throwing. He's got it all. He catches the ball like Andruw Jones did when he was 19. You can't hit a ball [past him] out there. He's got lightning in that bat too."

McCutchen posted a career day against the Chicago Cubs on May 14, going 5-for-5 with five runs scored in a 10–7 Pirates win. Teammate Garrett Jones also recorded five hits, making McCutchen and Jones the first Pirate duo since Hall of Fame inductee Willie Stargell and Bob Robertson accomplished the feat in 1970. "I guess we were just kind of competing against each other," McCutchen said, laughing. "I don't know. I'd get a hit, he'd get a hit. He'd hit a homer, I'd hit a homer." McCutchen finished the month of May with career-best numbers, hitting .327 with a .901 OPS, which drew comparisons with Tampa Bay Rays All-Star Carl Crawford.

McCutchen was not named to the 2010 National League All-Star Team. Pirates pitcher Evan Meek, who was named the Pirates representative, said that McCutchen was "very deserving" and should have gone as well.

After hitting .226 in August, McCutchen batted .326, with 22 runs and 15 RBIs, in September; he also recorded 12 multi-hit games from September 3 – October 3. McCutchen said about the changes from August to September, "Honestly, I don't think I'm doing anything any different right now. You swing, and the ball finds a hole. That's it. That's the game of baseball."

McCutchen finished his second major league season hitting .286/.365/.449 while adding 94 runs, 16 home runs, 56 RBIs, and 33 stolen bases (5th in the National League), with a 21.6 power-speed number (9th). On defense, he had 8 assists (3rd of all NL center fielders) and 2 double plays from center field (5th).

==== 2011 ====
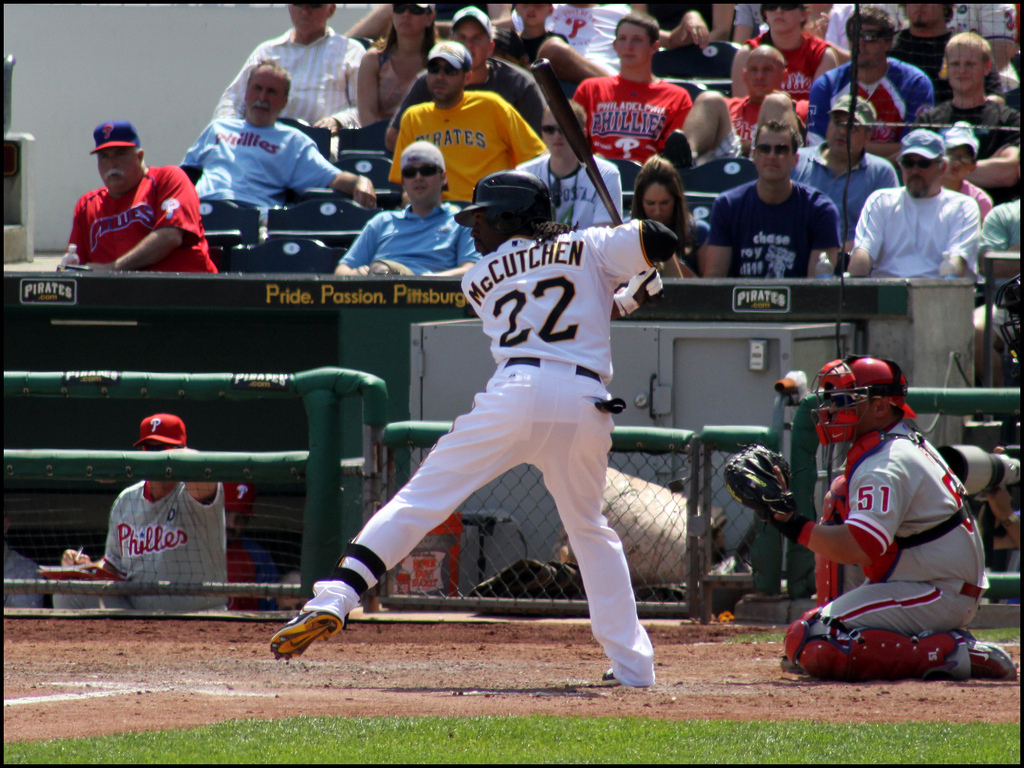
McCutchen in 2011

McCutchen took the place of the injured Ryan Braun as a member of the National League All Star team at the 2011 Major League Baseball All-Star Game in Phoenix. On August 30, 2011, McCutchen hit a ninth-inning homer against the Houston Astros to become the eighth Pirates player to record at least 20 home runs and 20 stolen bases in one season. He was the first Pirate to accomplish the feat since Nate McLouth in 2008.

McCutchen finished the season batting .259/.364/.456 with team highs of 23 home runs, 23 stolen bases, 87 runs, and 89 RBIs. He also had a 23.0 power-speed number (4th in the National League) and 89 walks (5th). On defense, he led all NL outfielders in putouts (414), double plays (5), and range factor/game (2.73). He was nominated as the Pirates' representative for the Hank Aaron Award.

==== 2012 ====
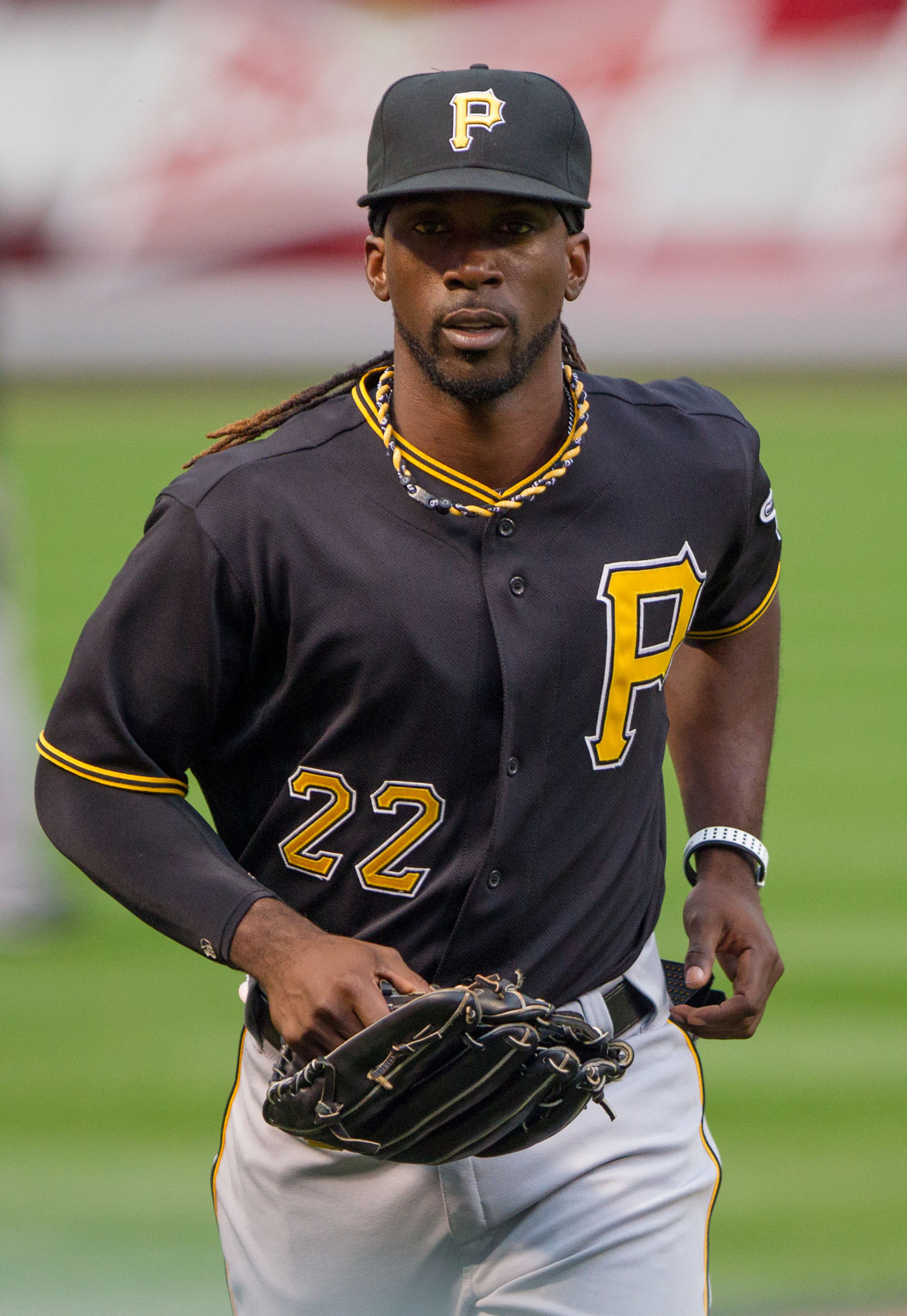
McCutchen in 2012

On March 5, 2012, McCutchen signed a six-year, $51.5 million contract extension with the Pirates, with a $14.75 million club option for 2018. He was a 2012 NL All Star. McCutchen was chosen to replace Giancarlo Stanton in the Home Run Derby due to injury. He hit 4 home runs during the first round of the competition, and failed to reach the second round.

McCutchen was named NL Player of the Month for June, his first selection. He won his first NL Player of the Week Award on July 8, and later won it a second consecutive week on July 15, becoming the first Pirate since Jason Bay in 2006 to do so. During July he hit .446 with seven home runs and 15 RBIs and was named the NL Player of the Month for a second consecutive month. He became the first Pirate since Bobby Bonilla during the 1988 season to earn the award twice in the same season.

McCutchen finished the season batting .327 (2nd in the NL)/.400 (3rd)/.553 (3rd), led the NL with 194 hits and 269 times on base, scored 107 runs (2nd), had 128 singles (2nd), had a 24.3 power-speed number (4th), drew 13 intentional walks (5th), hit 31 home runs (8th), and drew 70 walks (8th). He stole 20 bases, marking his fourth consecutive season of 20 or more on the season. On defense, he had a .997 fielding percentage (2nd-best among NL outfielders), and a 2.37 range factor/game (4th).

McCutchen finished third in the NL Most Valuable Player Award voting, behind San Francisco's Buster Posey and Milwaukee's Ryan Braun. McCutchen was voted the Player's Choice National League Outstanding Player. He also won his first Louisville Silver Slugger Award as the top offensive center fielder in baseball, won a Rawlings Gold Glove Award, and was named a 2012 NL Wilson Defensive Player of the Year in the outfield.

==== 2013: MVP season ====
In 2013, McCutchen was the athlete featured on the cover of the baseball video game MLB 13: The Show. He received 108,147 votes in a week of fan voting via Twitter and Facebook, while New York Yankees' pitcher CC Sabathia came in second with 89,054 votes. Though athletes cannot appear twice on the cover, he appeared on the back cover of the 2014 edition of the game.

On April 3, 2013, McCutchen stole his 100th career base. On September 3, 2013, facing Milwaukee Brewers pitcher Yovani Gallardo, he hit his 100th career home run.

McCutchen was named to the 2013 NL All-Star Team, becoming an All-Star for the third straight year as a reserve.

McCutchen finished the 2013 regular season batting .317 (7th in the National League)/.404 (3rd)/.508 (6th), with 185 hits and a 23.6 power-speed number (third), 78 walks and 12 intentional walks (4th), 97 runs (6th), 121 singles and 38 doubles (7th), 21 home runs, 84 RBIs, and 27 stolen bases (6th), which marked the fifth straight year he stole 20 or more bases. On defense, he led all NL center fielders with three double plays and was third with 11 assists. His efforts helped lead Pittsburgh to a winning record and the postseason for the first time since the 1992 Pirates team, led by Barry Bonds. They were eliminated by the St. Louis Cardinals in the NLDS in game 5.

McCutchen won the National League MVP over Arizona's Paul Goldschmidt and St. Louis' Yadier Molina, becoming the first Pirate to win the award since Bonds in 1992. He also won his second Silver Slugger Award, and his second NL Most Outstanding Player Award.

==== 2014 ====
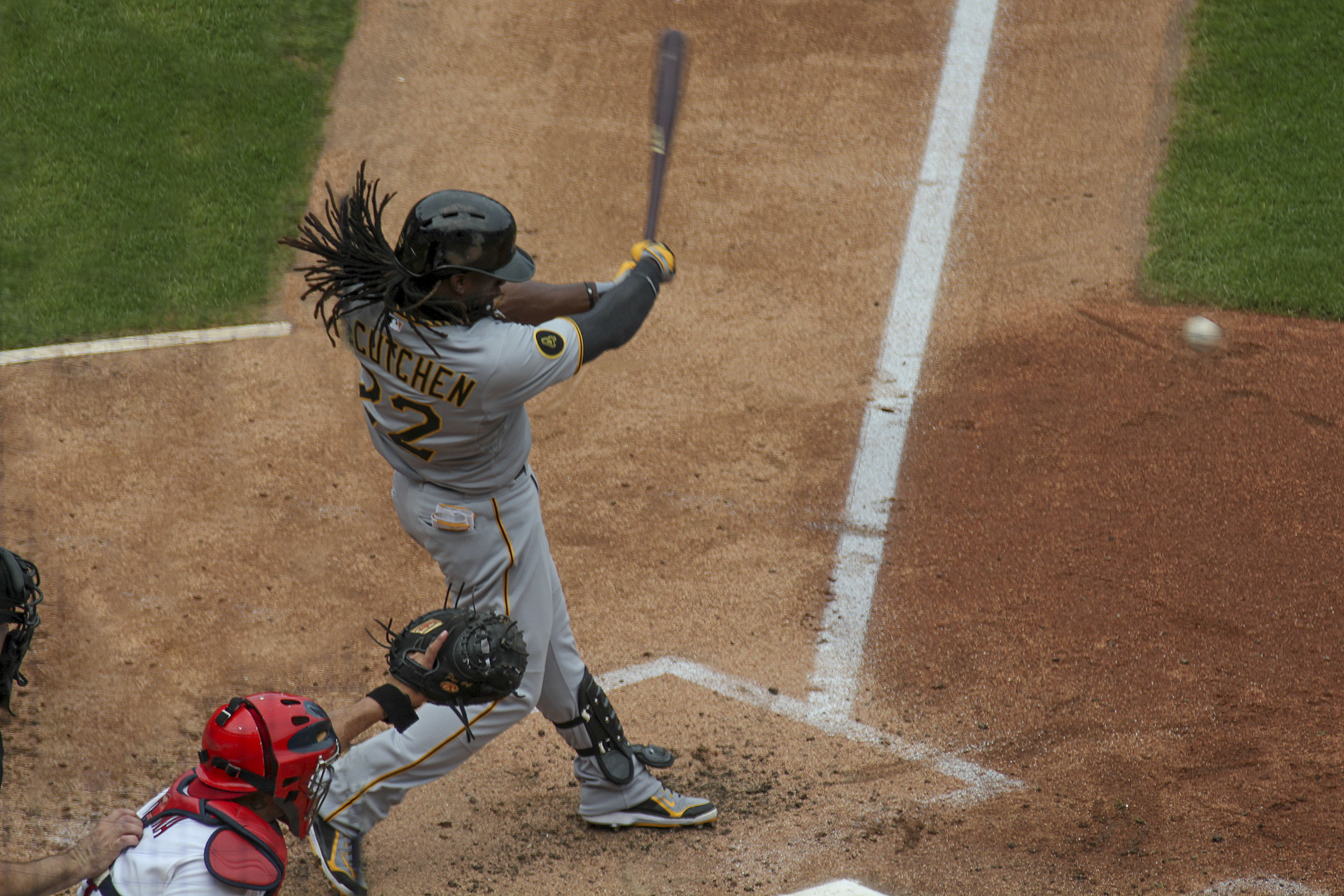
McCutchen batting in 2014 against the St. Louis Cardinals

On June 15, 2014, McCutchen won the NL Player of the Week Award, and in June 2014, he won the NL Player of the Month Award. On the 4th of July in 2014, against the in-state rival Philadelphia Phillies, McCutchen came close to hitting for the cycle by hitting 4-for-5 with two RBIs, barely missing a home run in the 8th inning when it hit the right field wall of PNC Park a few feet short of clearing it. On July 13, he again won the NL Player of the Week Award. On September 10, McCutchen hit his first career inside-the-park homer against the Phillies.

McCutchen was elected to the All-Star Game for the fourth time. He made his first All-Star Game start.

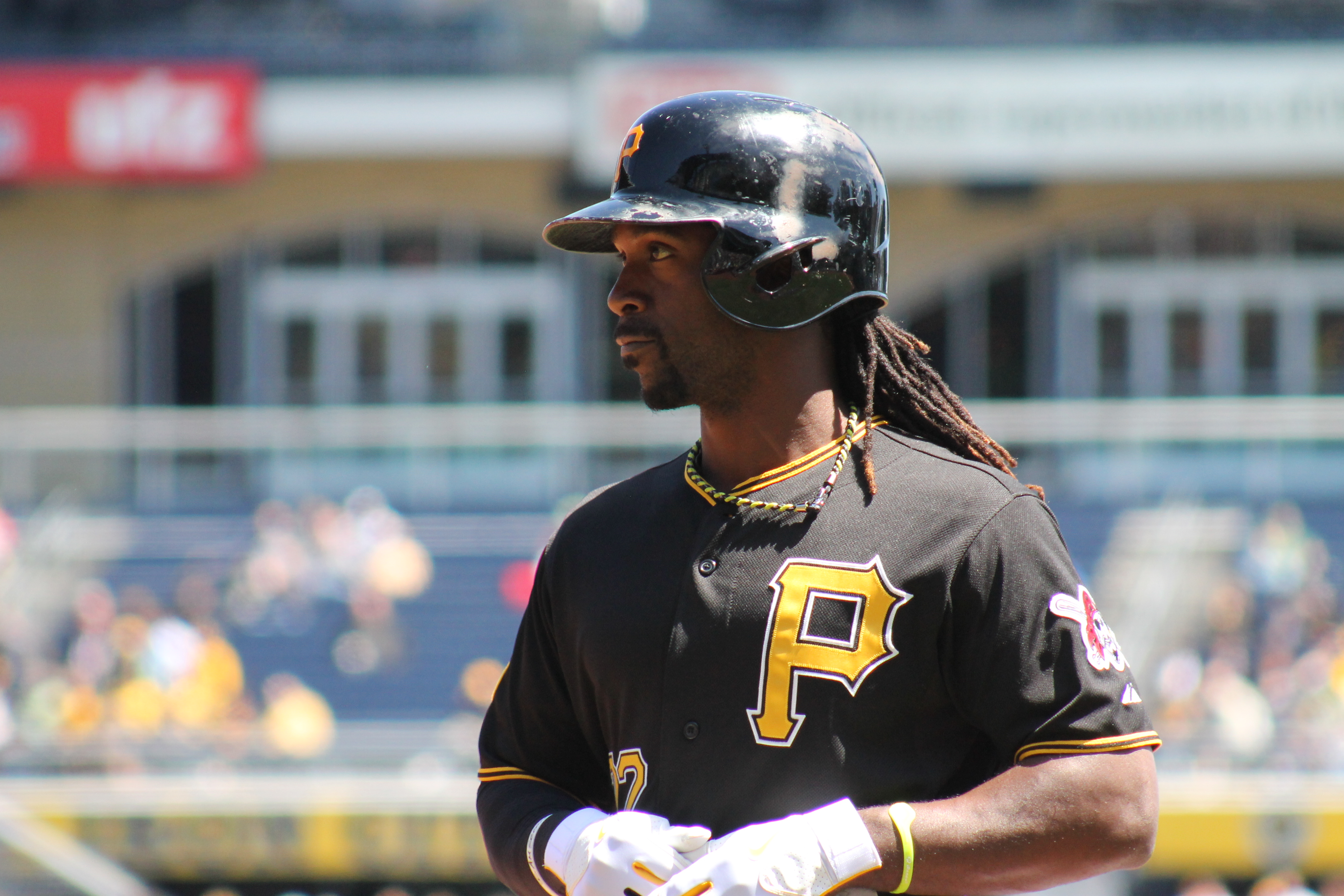
McCutchen in 2014

For the 2014 season, McCutchen batted .314 (3rd in the National League)/.410 (leading the league)/.542 (2nd in the league) with a .952 OPS (leading the league). He had 69 extra base hits (leading the league), 297 total bases (2nd), 84 walks (4th), an 85.71 stolen base percentage (5th), a 20.9 power-speed number (6th), 38 doubles (7th), 25 home runs (8th), 89 runs (10th), 8 intentional walks (10th), 18 stolen bases, and 83 RBIs.

McCutchen was awarded his third consecutive Silver Slugger for NL outfielders. He came in third in the voting for National League MVP, behind Clayton Kershaw and Giancarlo Stanton.

==== 2015 ====
On April 29, 2015, McCutchen recorded his 1,000th career hit, a single off Chicago Cubs' starter Edwin Jackson. On May 24, he was named NL Player of the Week.

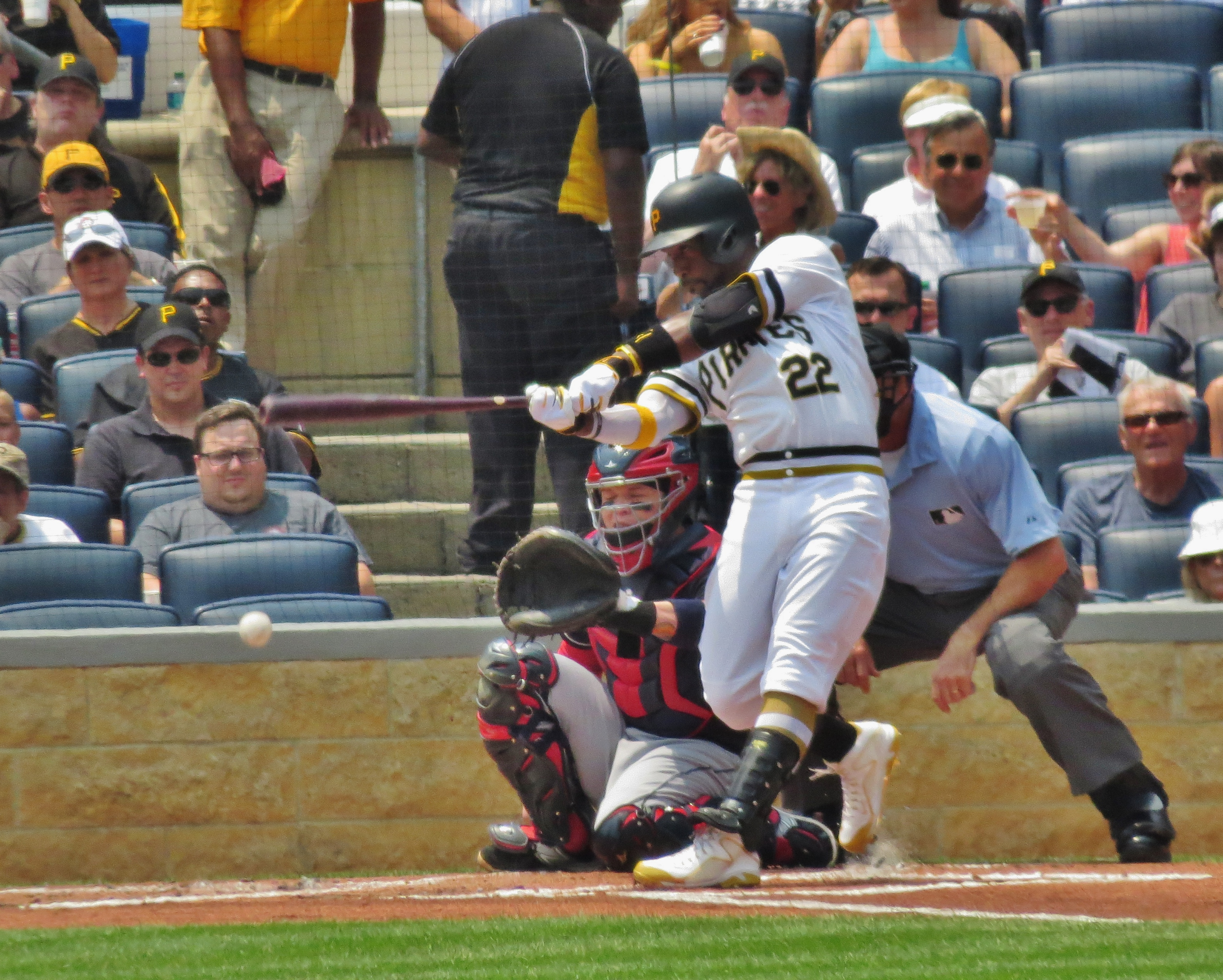
McCutchen in July 2015

In July, McCutchen was selected as an All Star for the fifth consecutive year. During the game, he hit a solo home run off Tampa Bay Rays pitcher Chris Archer, joining Ralph Kiner, Willie Stargell, Roberto Clemente, Arky Vaughan, and Dave Parker as the sixth Pirate to homer in an All Star Game. On August 9, he was again named NL Player of the Week, and in August he was named NL Player of the Month.

Overall in 2015, McCutchen batted .292/.401 (4th in the National League)/.488 with 23 home runs, nine sacrifice flies (3rd), 98 walks (4th), 12 intentional walks (5th), tied a career-high with 96 RBIs (8th), 12 hit by pitch (9th), 36 doubles (10th), 276 total bases (10th), and 11 stolen bases. On defense, he had two double plays (second among NL center fielders), seven outfield assists (3rd), and a .994 fielding percentage (3rd). He helped lead the Pirates to a 98-win season (second best in MLB), and their third consecutive Wild Card berth.

After the season, McCutchen won his fourth straight Silver Slugger. He was also named the winner of the 2015 Roberto Clemente Award, becoming the first Pirate to win the honor since Willie Stargell in 1974. He came in 5th in the voting for National League MVP.

==== 2016 ====
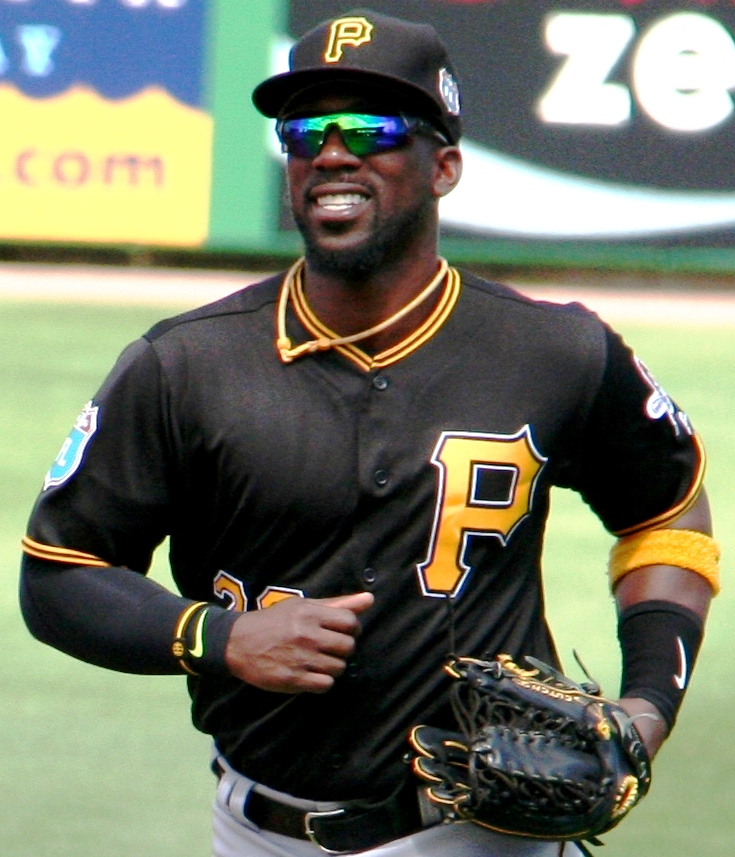
McCutchen during spring training 2016

On April 26, 2016, for the second time in his career, McCutchen hit three home runs in a single game against the Colorado Rockies, ending a 3-for-23 slump.

Overall for the year, McCutchen batted .256 (his lowest-ever batting average)/.336/.430, with 24 home runs and 79 RBIs. On defense, he was 3rd in the NL in outfield putouts (317), and 5th in center fielder fielding percentage (.991).

==== 2017 ====
During the 2016 Winter Meetings, Pirates' general manager Neal Huntington reportedly came close to trading McCutchen to the Washington Nationals. McCutchen said that he dreaded the possibility of leaving Pittsburgh, and admitted to "googling" his own name in anticipation of a trade. He later expressed his desire to remain with the Pirates for his entire career.

In March, McCutchen participated in the 2017 World Baseball Classic with the United States national baseball team. In the semi-final game against Team Japan, McCutchen hit a RBI-single in a 2–1 victory for Team USA. On March 22, Team USA defeated Team Puerto Rico 8–0, to win the first World Baseball Classic gold medal for the United States.

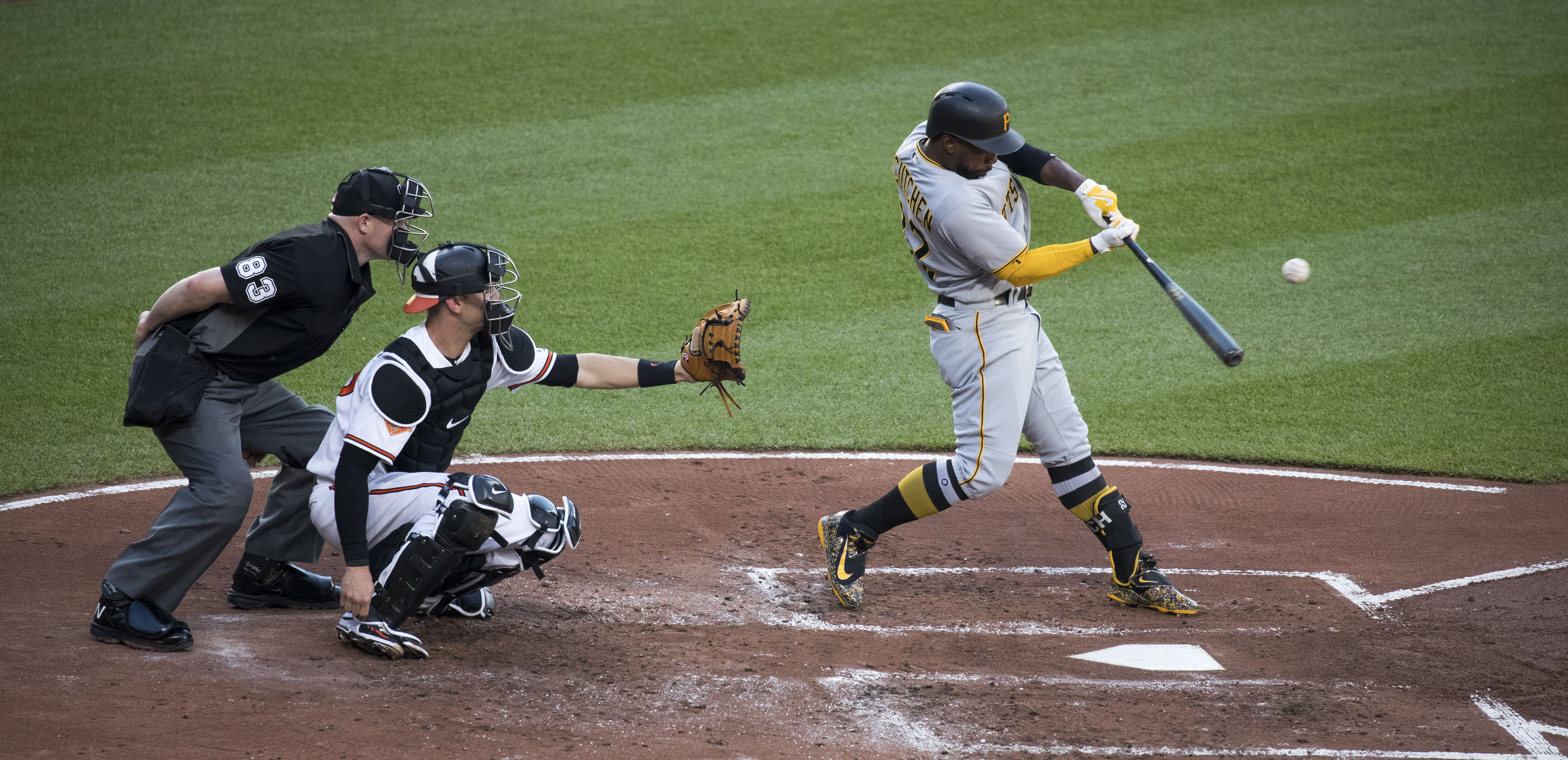
McCutchen in 2017

In June, after hitting .411 with six home runs and only 12 strikeouts, McCutchen was named National League Player of the Month. On September 26, he hit his first career grand slam. On October 1, he was named NL Player of the Week.

In total with the 2017 Pirates, McCutchen batted .279/.363/.486, with 28 home runs, 11 stolen bases, and 88 RBIs. He batted .336 against left-handers (8th-best in the NL). Defensively, he made 139 appearances in center field and, for the first time in his career, 13 appearances in right field, and his 9 outfield assists were 4th in the National League.

As of 2018, McCutchen was 2nd of all Pirates players in career power-speed number (185.6; behind Barry Bonds), 4th in home runs (203; behind Hall of Famers Willie Stargell, Ralph Kiner, and Roberto Clemente), 7th in walks (685), extra base hits (539), and sacrifice flies (47), 9th in doubles (292) and intentional walks (63), and 10th in total bases (2,452) and hit by pitch (61).

=== San Francisco Giants (2018) ===
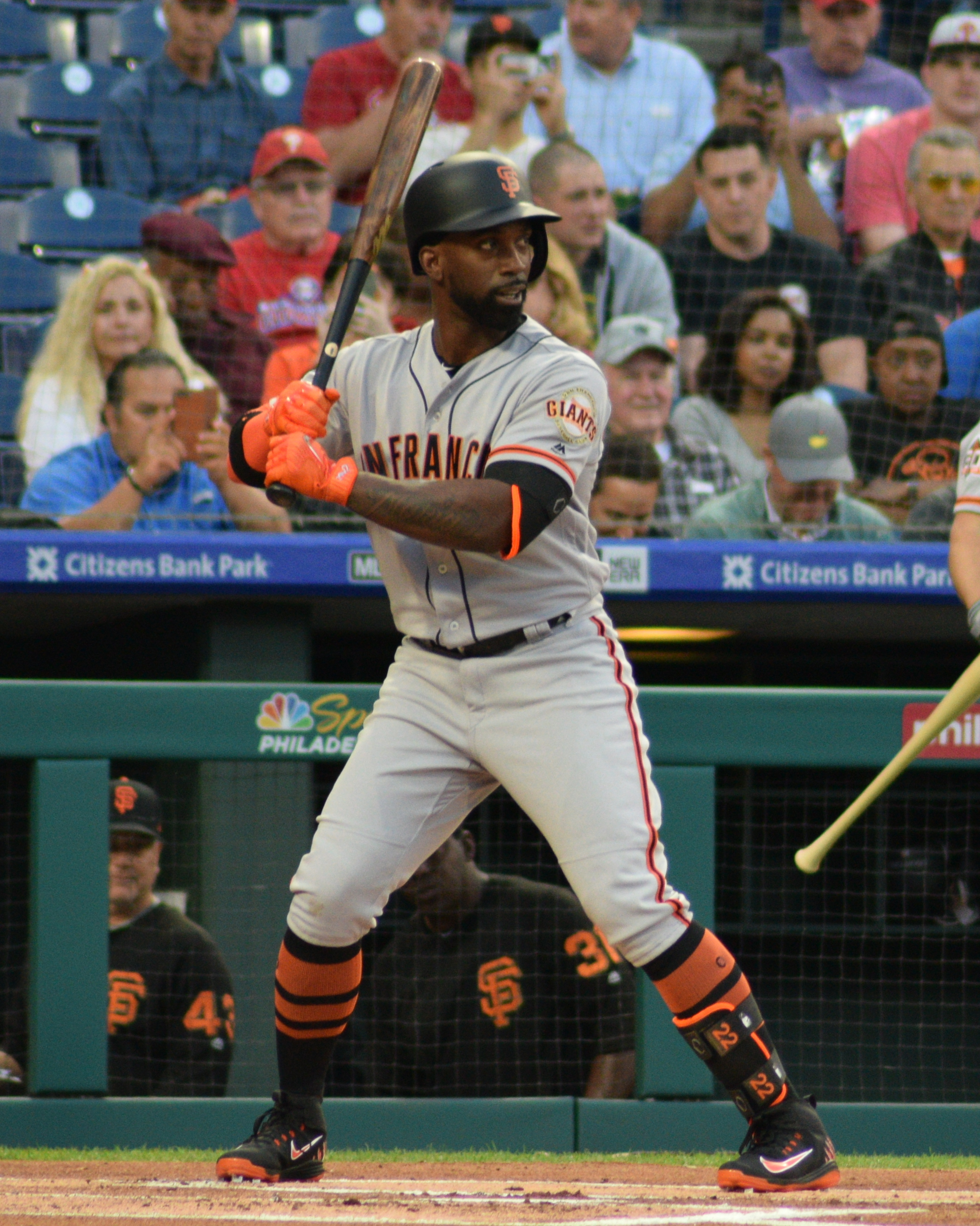
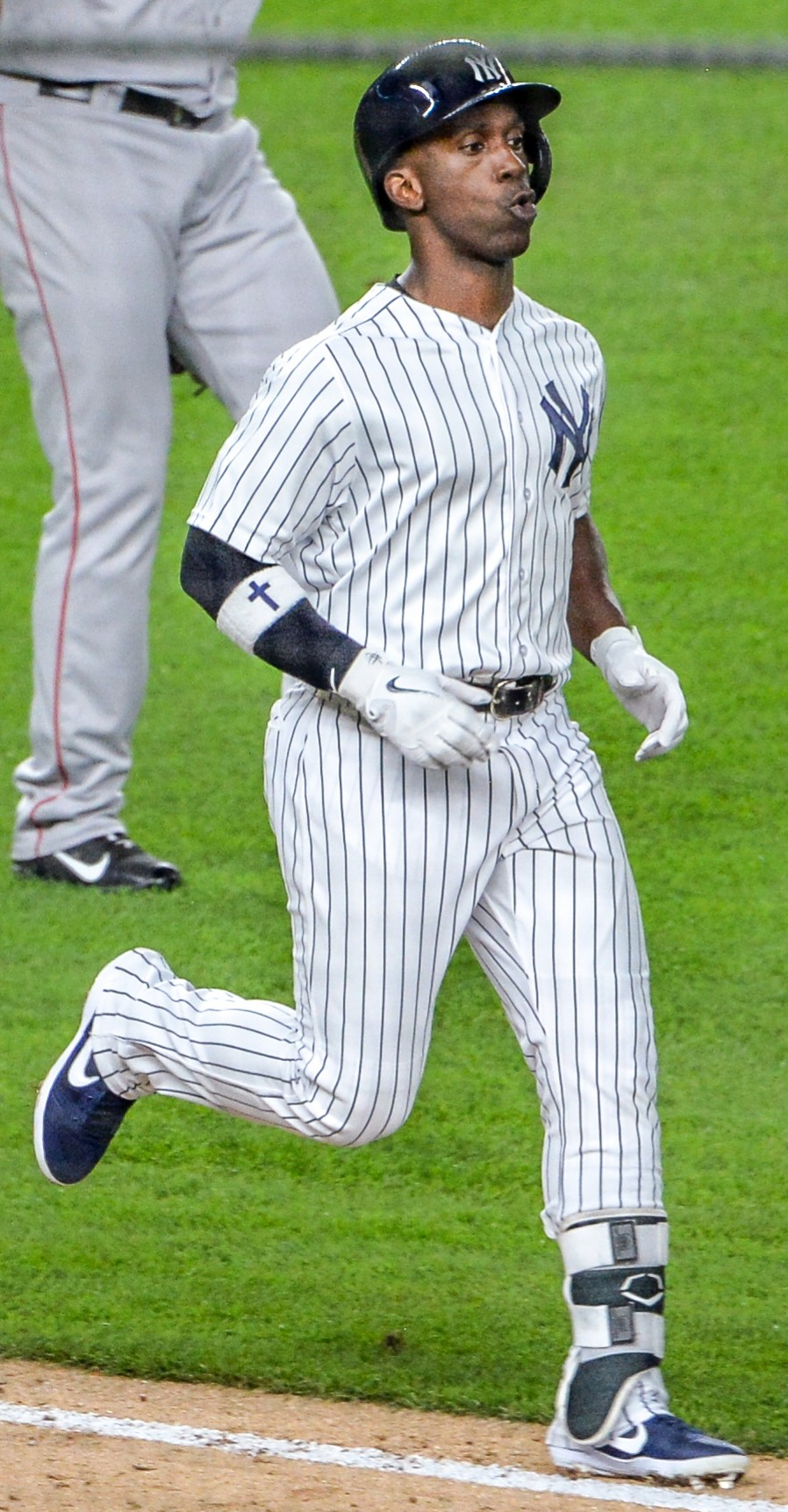
McCutchen in the 2018 season: with the San Francisco Giants (left) and with the New York Yankees (right)

On January 15, 2018, the Pirates traded McCutchen to the San Francisco Giants, along with cash considerations, in exchange for Kyle Crick, Bryan Reynolds, and $500,000 of international bonus slot money. On April 7, McCutchen had six hits in a game, going six-for-seven with four RBIs against the Los Angeles Dodgers, his final hit being a three-run walk-off home run in the 14th inning. On May 11, the Giants traveled to PNC Park in Pittsburgh, and McCutchen received a standing ovation from Pirates fans. Overall with the 2018 Giants, McCutchen appeared in 130 games, batting .255 with 15 home runs. He led the club in runs scored (65), doubles (28, tied with Brandon Crawford), RBI (55), stolen bases (13), walks (73), slugging percentage (.415) and on base plus slugging (.772). All of his defensive appearances were in right field.

=== New York Yankees (2018) ===
On August 31, 2018, the Giants traded McCutchen to the New York Yankees in exchange for infielder Abiatal Avelino and pitcher Juan De Paula. In light of the Yankees personal appearance policy, McCutchen shaved off his beard. McCutchen also changed his jersey number from 22, which he had worn his entire career, to 26, due to 22 having been assigned to Jacoby Ellsbury.

For the 2018 season, between the two teams, McCutchen batted .255/.368/.424 with 20 home runs (his 20 or more home runs for eight straight seasons was the longest active streak among MLB players), 95 walks (8th in the major leagues), 14 stolen bases, and 65 RBIs. With the Yankees he hit. 253 with five home runs and ten RBIs.

=== Philadelphia Phillies (2019–2021) ===
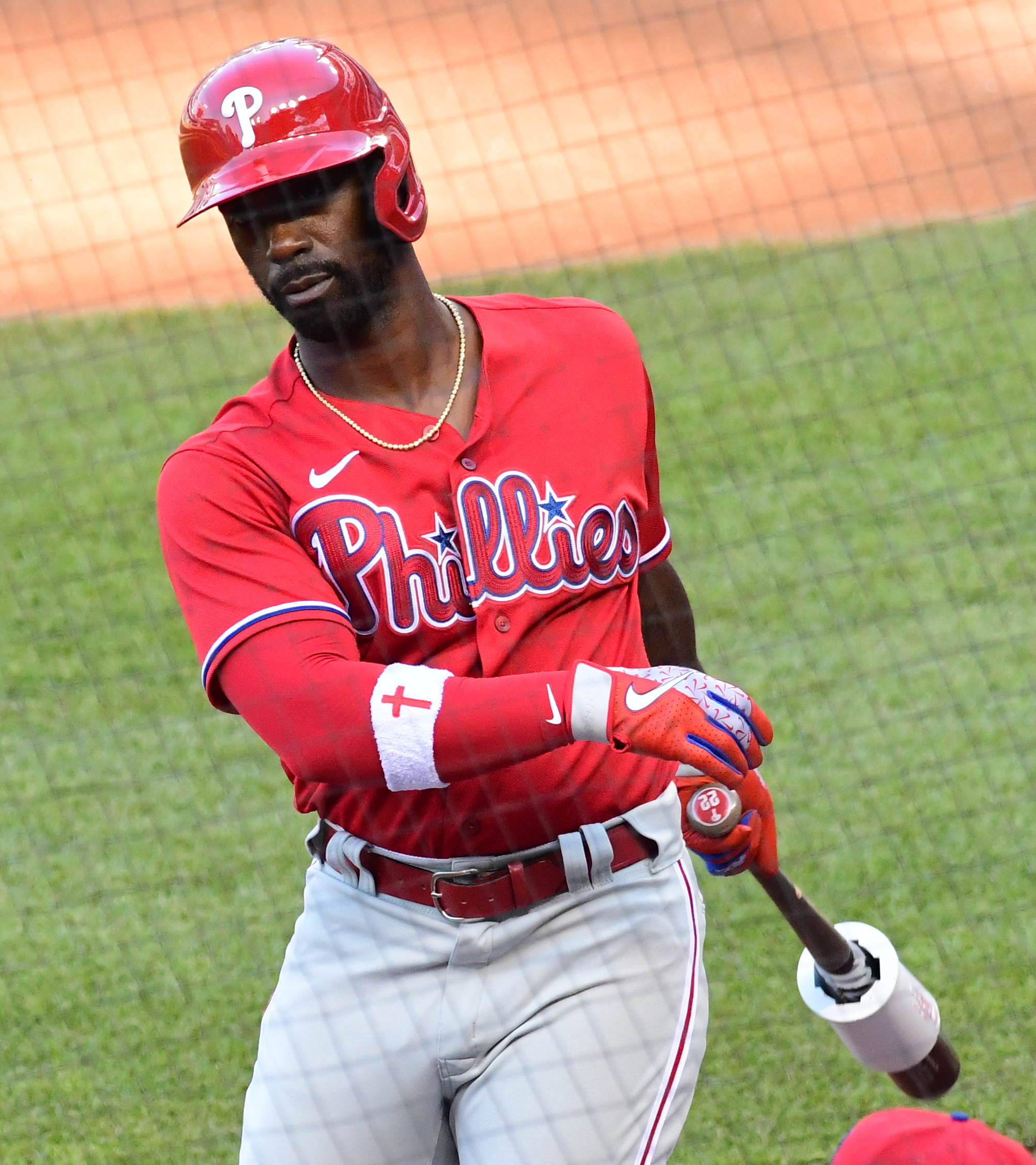
McCutchen with the Phillies in 2020

On December 12, 2018, the Philadelphia Phillies signed McCutchen to a three-year contract worth $50 million, with a $15 million club option and a $3 million buyout for 2022. On June 3, 2019, McCutchen suffered a knee injury running the bases against the San Diego Padres. On June 4, an MRI revealed McCutchen had a torn ACL, and he was ruled out for the rest of the season. On June 14, he had surgery to reconstruct the ACL in his left knee and to repair a medial meniscus. At the time of his injury, he was batting .256/.378/.457 with 10 home runs and 29 RBIs in 219 at bats, leading the NL with 43 walks, and ranked 3rd with 4.45 pitches per plate appearance and 5th with 45 runs scored.

During the pandemic-shortened 2020 season, McCutchen hit .253/.324/.433 with 10 home runs and 34 RBIs in 57 games. Through 2020, he was 5th among active major leaguers in career triples (48), 8th in career walks (845), and 9th in career runs scored (974).

In 2021, McCutchen batted .222/.334/.444 with 27 home runs and 80 RBIs in 144 games, spending most of the season in right field.

=== Milwaukee Brewers (2022) ===
On March 16, 2022, McCutchen signed a one-year contract with the Milwaukee Brewers worth $8.5 million. McCutchen made his Brewers debut on April 7, and recorded a double to the right field corner off Chicago Cubs starter Kyle Hendricks in his first at-bat. He was placed on the COVID-19 injury list on May 7. On September 23, McCutchen notched his 1,000th career RBI, scoring Rowdy Tellez on a fielder's choice off of Cincinnati Reds starter Luis Cessa.

In 2022, McCutchen batted .237/.316/.384 (the lowest slugging percentage of his career) with 17 home runs in 515 at bats. For the first time in his career, McCutchen made more starts as a designated hitter than in the field, as he logged 82 DH starts compared to 49 outfield starts. He had the fastest sprint speed of all major league designated hitters, at 28.9 feet/second.

=== Pittsburgh Pirates (2023–2025) ===
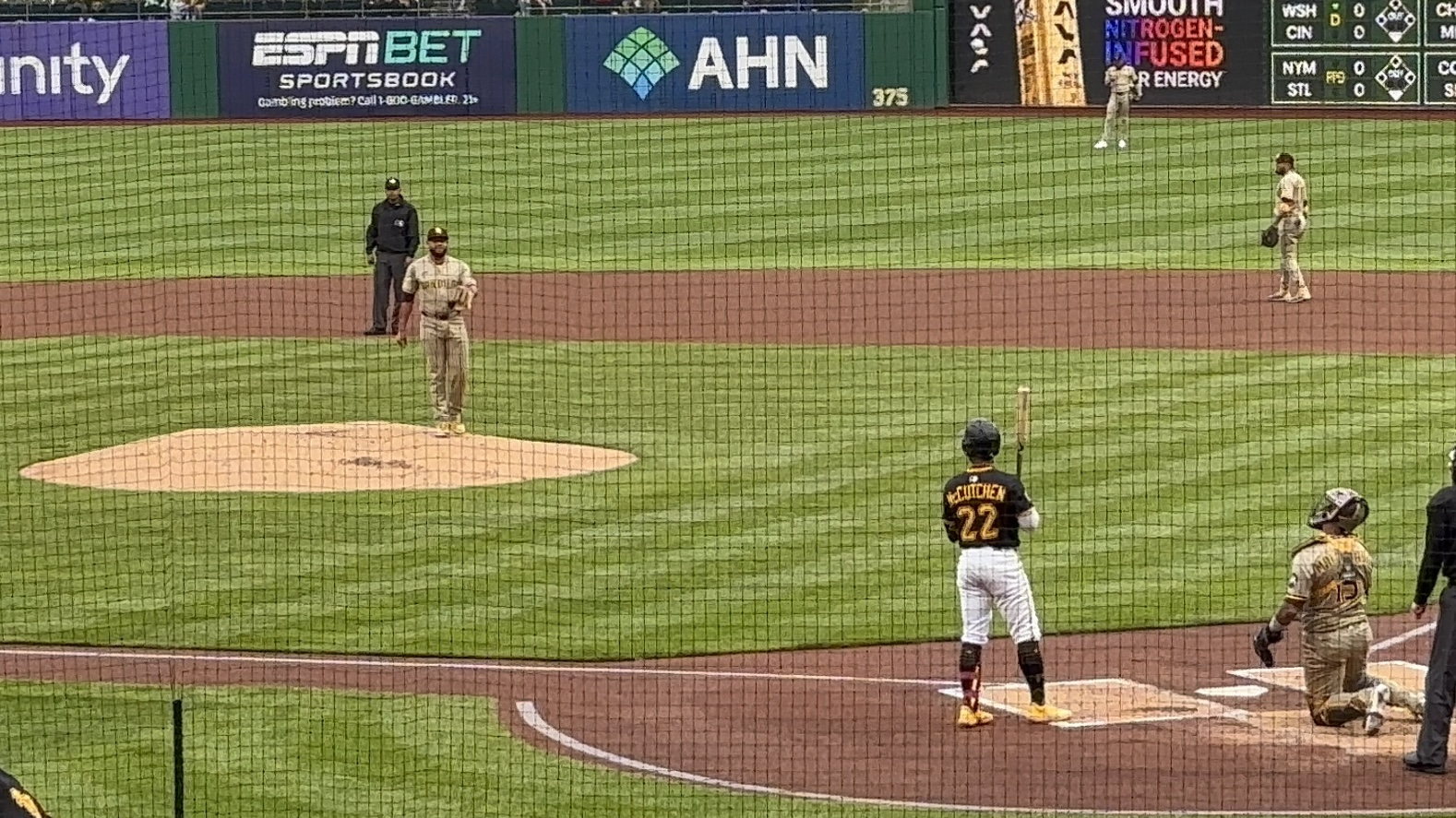
McCutchen up to bat against the San Diego Padres in 2025

On January 20, 2023, McCutchen signed a one-year, $5 million contract to return to the Pittsburgh Pirates. He made his return to PNC Park at the Pirates' home opener on April 7, 2023, where he received a standing ovation that lasted over a minute prior to his first at bat. McCutchen recorded his 2,000th career hit on June 11, a single off of New York Mets starter Carlos Carrasco. On September 6, the Pirates placed McCutchen on the 10–day injured list after suffering a season–ending partial left Achilles tendon tear. He finished the season with 12 home runs, 43 RBIs, and a .256/.378/.397 slash line. McCutchen became a full-time designated hitter in 2023, with 97 starts at DH and only 7 in the outfield. He became a free agent following the season.

On December 20, 2023, McCutchen signed a one-year, $5 million contract to stay with Pittsburgh. He stated that he plans to play at least two more seasons and hopes to retire as a Pirate. On April 14, 2024, McCutchen hit his 300th home run, a two-run shot off of Philadelphia Phillies reliever Ricardo Pinto. In 120 appearances for the Pirates, he slashed .232/.328/.411 with 20 home runs and 50 RBI.

On December 23, 2024, McCutchen re–signed with the Pirates on a one-year, $5 million contract. On June 1, 2025, McCutchen hit his fourth home run of the season, tying with Roberto Clemente in third place on the Pirates franchise home run list with 240 home runs. On June 8, McCutchen recorded his 2,200th career hit against the Philadelphia Phillies when he hit a single to left field off of Phillies pitcher Cristopher Sánchez. He becomes the 190th player in MLB history to reach 2,200 career hits. On June 10, McCutchen hit his sixth home run of the season, passing Roberto Clemente in third place on the Pirates franchise home run list with 241 home runs. On July 28, McCutchen hit his tenth home run of the season, becoming the 11th player in Major League history to record at least ten home runs in each of their first 17 seasons. The other ten players are Hank Aaron, Eddie Murray, Carl Yastrzemski, Barry Bonds, Albert Pujols, Frank Robinson, Harold Baines, Mickey Mantle, Jeff Kent, and Willie McCovey. In 135 appearances for the Pirates, he slashed .239/.333/.367 with 13 home runs and 57 RBI.

=== Texas Rangers ===
On March 5, 2026, McCutchen signed a minor league contract with the Texas Rangers. On March 23, the Rangers announced that McCutchen had made the team's Opening Day roster. Two days later, Texas formally selected his contract. McCutchen hit a three-run home run on March 29, the team's first of the year, to propel the Rangers to a 5–3 victory, and recorded the game-winning RBI single in the 10th inning. He made 37 appearances for Texas, slashing .192/.277/.260 with one home run and five RBI. On May 27, McCutchen was designated for assignment by the Rangers. He was released by the team the following day.

=== Atlanta Braves ===
On July 2, 2026, McCutchen signed a minor league contract with the Atlanta Braves. He made 13 appearances for the rookie–level Florida Complex League Braves and Triple–A Gwinnett Stripers, batting .275/.370/.450 with one home run, seven RBI, and one stolen base. McCutchen was released by Atlanta on August 4.

== Awards ==
- Baseball America Rookie of the Year (2009)
- Home Run Derby participant (2012)
- 5× Major League Baseball All-Star (2011, 2012, 2013, 2014, 2015)
- National League Most Valuable Player Award (2013)
- 5× National League Player of the Month Award (June 2012, July 2012, June 2014, August 2015, June 2017)
- 6× National League Player of the Week Award (July 8, 2012; July 15, 2012; June 15, 2014; July 13, 2014; May 24, 2015; August 9, 2015)
- 2× Players Choice Award for National League Outstanding Player (2012, 2013)
- Rawlings Gold Glove Award at outfield (2012)
- Roberto Clemente Award (2015)
- 4× Silver Slugger Award at outfield (2012–15)

== Personal life ==
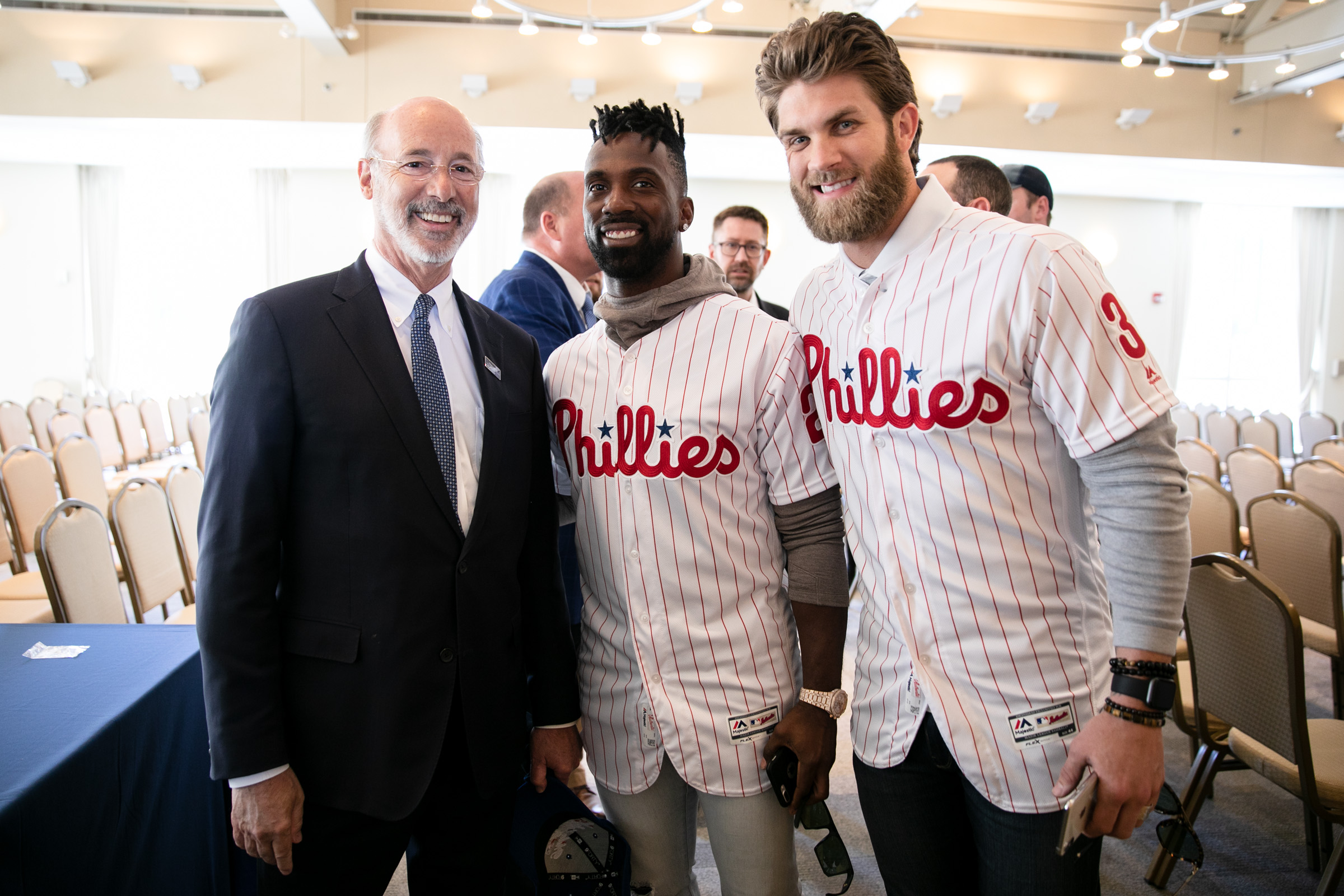
McCutchen with Governor Tom Wolf and Phillies teammate Bryce Harper in 2019

Early in his career, McCutchen was known across the league for his long dreadlocks. Before the 2014 MLB season, he told the Pittsburgh Tribune-Review: "It's good to have an image. I have the hair, but eventually I'm gonna cut it". On March 25, 2015, McCutchen cut his dreadlocks, which were sold through MLB's website via auction, with all proceeds benefiting Pirates Charities. McCutchen teased his fans on social media for a big "secret" before unveiling his new haircut.

McCutchen is active on X (Formerly Twitter) and Instagram, often posting and engaging with fans. In 2020, McCutchen spawned his alter ego, "Uncle Larry," after Fox Philadelphia sports anchor Howard Eskin confused McCutchen for 1970s Los Angeles Rams running back Lawrence McCutcheon. McCutchen appeared as Uncle Larry during a May 2020 episode of MLB Network's Intentional Talk, sporting sunglasses, a wig, and a half-unbuttoned jersey. The Uncle Larry gig spawned a rash of merchandise, including t-shirts, a bobblehead, and a trading card in 2021.

McCutchen proposed to his longtime girlfriend Maria Hanslovan on the December 11, 2013, episode of The Ellen DeGeneres Show. On November 27, 2017, McCutchen and his wife announced the birth of their first child, a son. On December 24, 2019, McCutchen and his wife announced the birth of their second son, and on October 25, 2021, it was announced on Instagram that Maria gave birth to their first daughter. On March 9, 2024, a second daughter was born. They reside in Pittsburgh.

McCutchen, the son of a minister, is a Christian.

In May 2021, McCutchen provided voice acting for an episode of the Disney Junior television show Puppy Dog Pals. He voiced "a cool, card-playing dog" who helps the main characters find an autographed baseball card of their favorite player, voiced by Mookie Betts.

== See also ==
- List of Major League Baseball career bases on balls leaders
- List of Major League Baseball career games played as a center fielder leaders
- List of Major League Baseball career games played as an outfielder leaders
- List of Major League Baseball career hits leaders
- List of Major League Baseball career home run leaders
- List of Major League Baseball career putouts as a center fielder leaders
- List of Major League Baseball career runs batted in leaders
- List of Major League Baseball career runs scored leaders
- List of Major League Baseball career strikeouts by batters leaders
- List of Major League Baseball single-game hits leaders
- List of Pittsburgh Pirates award winners and league leaders

Awards and achievements
Preceded by Adrián González	MLB: The Show Cover athlete (American release); MLB 13: The Show	Succeeded by Miguel Cabrera
Preceded by Giancarlo Stanton	National League Player of the Month; June–July 2012	Succeeded by Chase Headley
