= Duke Snider =

American baseball player (1926–2011)

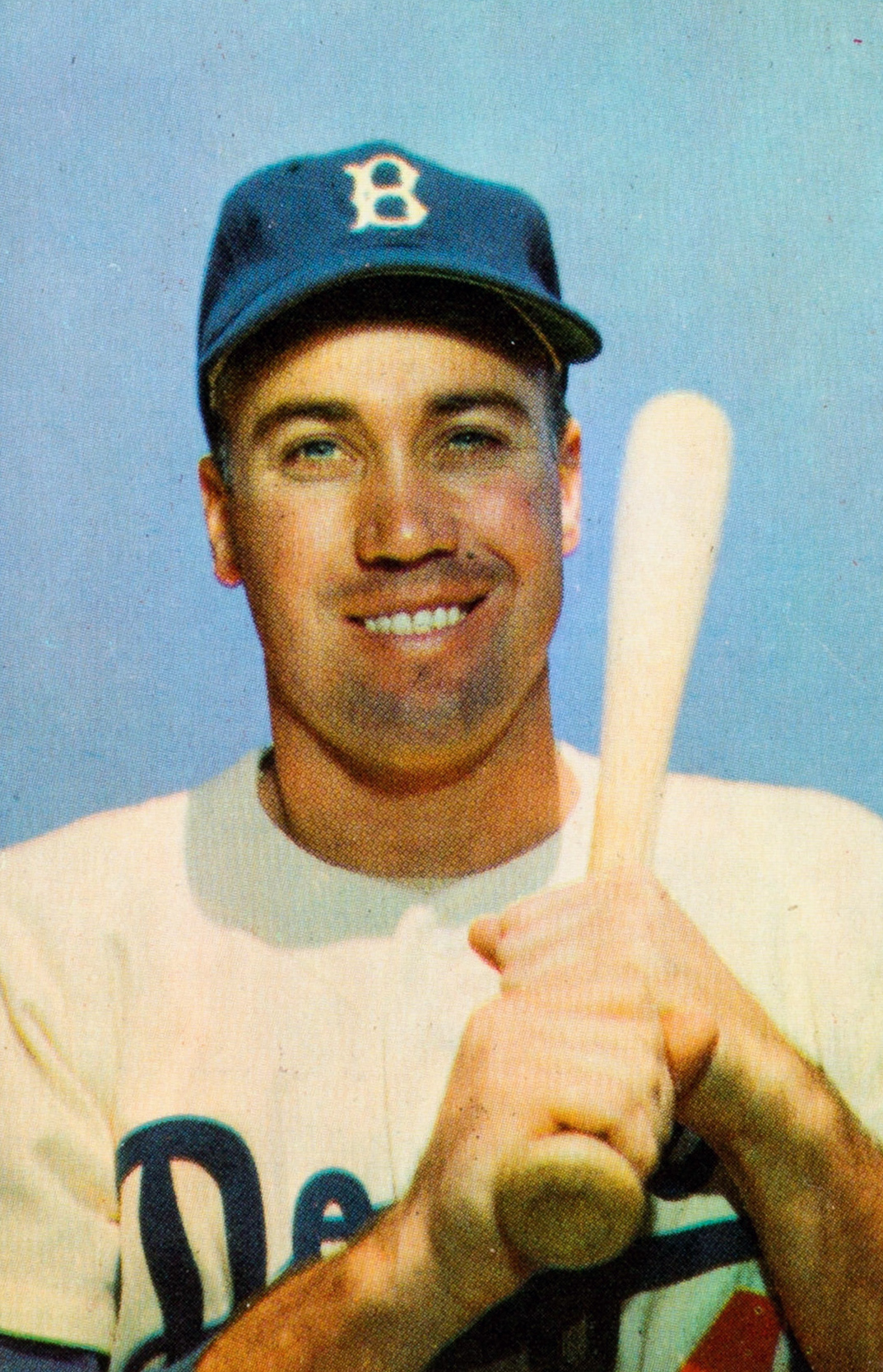
- Snider with the Brooklyn Dodgers in 1953
- Center fielder
- Born: September 19, 1926; Los Angeles, California, U.S.
- Died: February 27, 2011 (aged 84); Escondido, California, U.S.
- Batted: Left Threw: Right

MLB debut
- April 17, 1947, for the Brooklyn Dodgers

Last MLB appearance
- October 3, 1964, for the San Francisco Giants

MLB statistics
- Batting average: .295
- Hits: 2,116
- Home runs: 407
- Runs batted in: 1,333
- Stats at Baseball Reference

Teams
- Brooklyn / Los Angeles Dodgers (1947–1962); New York Mets (1963); San Francisco Giants (1964)

Career highlights and awards
- 8× All-Star (1950–1956, 1963); 2× World Series champion (1955, 1959); NL home run leader (1956); NL RBI leader (1955); Los Angeles Dodgers No. 4 retired

Member of the National

Baseball Hall of Fame
- Induction: 1980
- Vote: 86.5% (11th ballot)

Edwin Donald "Duke" Snider (September 19, 1926 – February 27, 2011), nicknamed "the Duke of Flatbush", was an American professional baseball player. Primarily a center fielder, he spent most of his Major League Baseball (MLB) career playing for the Brooklyn / Los Angeles Dodgers (1947–1962), later playing one season each for the New York Mets (1963) and San Francisco Giants (1964).

Snider was named to the National League (NL) All-Star roster eight times and was the NL Most Valuable Player (MVP) runner-up in 1955. In his 16 seasons with the Dodgers, he helped lead the team to six World Series, with victories in 1955 and 1959. He was elected to the National Baseball Hall of Fame in 1980.

== Early life ==
Snider was born in Los Angeles. He was nicknamed "Duke" by his father at age 5 as the result of a self-confident swagger that caused his parents to say he carried himself like royalty. Snider was a gifted all-around athlete, playing basketball, football, and baseball at Compton High School, class of 1944. He was a strong-armed quarterback, who reportedly could throw the football 70 yards.

== Minor leagues ==
Snider was spotted by one of Branch Rickey's scouts in the early 1940s, and he was signed to a baseball contract out of high school in 1943. He played briefly for the Montreal Royals of the International League in 1944 (batting twice) and for the Newport News Dodgers in the Piedmont League in the same year. After serving in the U.S. Navy in 1945 and part of 1946, he came back to play for the Fort Worth Cats that year, and also for St. Paul in 1947.

== Major leagues ==
Snider earned a tryout with the Brooklyn Dodgers during their spring training in 1947. He got a single in his first major league at bat, in the second Dodgers game of the 1947 season on April 17. He played in 39 more games that season, and became a friend of Jackie Robinson before he was sent to the St. Paul team in early July. Snider returned to the Dodgers at the end of the season in time for the World Series against the New York Yankees. After spring training with the Dodgers, he started the 1948 season with Montreal, and after posting a .327 average was called up to Brooklyn in August and played in 53 games.

=== The Boys of Summer ===
In 1949, he became a regular major leaguer, hitting 23 home runs with 92 runs batted in, helping the Dodgers into the World Series. Snider also saw his batting average climb from .244 to .292. A more mature Snider became the "trigger man" in a power-laden lineup which boasted players Joe Black, Roy Campanella, Billy Cox, Carl Erskine, Carl Furillo, Gil Hodges, Clem Labine, Pee Wee Reese, Jackie Robinson, and Preacher Roe. Often compared with two other New York center fielders, fellow Baseball Hall of Famers, Mickey Mantle and Willie Mays, he was the reigning "Duke" of Flatbush.

In 1950, he hit .321 and led the National League with 199 base hits and 343 total bases, earning his first All-Star Game appearance. When his average slipped to .277 in 1951, Snider was roundly criticized in the newspapers. The Dodgers had lost a 13‑game August lead, and finished second to the Giants after Bobby Thomson's "Shot Heard 'Round the World". Snider recalls, "I went to Walter O'Malley and told him I couldn't take the pressure", and, "I told him I'd just as soon be traded. I told him I figured I could do the Dodgers no good." The trade did not happen.

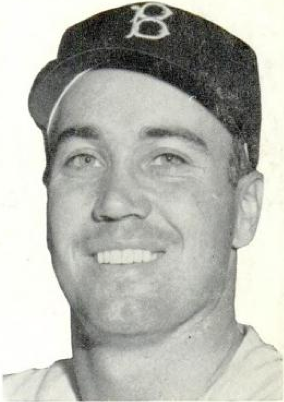
Snider in 1954

Usually batting third in the lineup, Snider established impressive offensive numbers. He hit 40 or more home runs in five consecutive seasons (1953–1957), and between 1953 and 1956 he averaged 42 home runs, 124 RBI, 123 runs, and a .320 batting average. He led the National League (NL) in runs scored, home runs, and RBI in separate seasons. He appeared in six World Series with the Dodgers (1949, 1952–53, 1955–56, 1959), facing the New York Yankees in the first five and the Chicago White Sox in the last. The Dodgers won the World Series in 1955 and in 1959.

=== Decline ===
Snider's career numbers declined when the team moved to his hometown of Los Angeles in 1958. Coupled with an aching knee and a 440-foot (130 m) right field fence at the cavernous Coliseum, Snider hit only 15 home runs in 1958. However, he had one last hurrah in 1959 as he helped the Dodgers win their first World Series in Los Angeles. He rebounded that year to hit .308 with 23 home runs and 88 RBI in 370 at bats, while sharing fielding duties in right and center fields with Don Demeter and rookie Ron Fairly. Injuries and age would eventually play a role in reducing Snider to part-time status by 1961.

In 1962 when the Dodgers led the NL for most of the season (only to find themselves tied with the hated Giants at the season's end), it was Snider and third-base coach Leo Durocher who reportedly pleaded with manager Walter Alston to bring in future Hall of Fame pitcher (and Cy Young Award winner that year) Don Drysdale in the ninth inning of the third and deciding playoff game. Instead, Alston brought in Stan Williams to relieve a tiring Eddie Roebuck. A 4–2 lead turned into a 6–4 loss as the Giants rallied to win the pennant. Snider was subsequently sold to the New York Mets. It is said that Drysdale, his roommate, broke down and cried when he got the news of Snider's departure.

=== Final years ===
When Snider joined the Mets, he discovered that his familiar number 4 was being worn by Charlie Neal. Snider wore number 11 during the first half of the season, then switched back to 4 after Neal was traded. He proved to be a sentimental favorite among former Dodger fans who rooted for the Mets. On April 16, 1963, Snider recorded his 2,000th hit, doing so at Crosley Field against the Cincinnati Reds on a single off Jim Maloney in the 2nd inning. On June 14, he recorded his 400th home run, in the first inning off the Reds' Bob Purkey. He was named to the All-Star Game in Cleveland, his eighth and final selection. He entered the game as a pinch hitter for Tommy Davis in the top of the ninth inning. Facing Dick Radatz, he struck out looking. For the season with the Mets, he appeared in 129 games, batting .243, with a .345 on-base percentage, and slugging percentage of .401, tallying 14 home runs, 45 RBIs, 45 walks, and 56 strikeouts. After one season, Snider asked to be traded to a contending team.

Snider was sold to the San Francisco Giants on Opening Day in 1964. Knowing that he had no chance of wearing number 4, which had been worn by Half of Fame legend Mel Ott and retired by the Giants, Snider took number 28. In 91 games, he batted a line of .210/.302/.323, while hitting four home runs and driving in 17 RBIs. He had no triples for the first and only time in his career. He had 40 strikeouts and 22 walks. In addition to playing center field, he played 26 games in right field and 18 in left field, for a combined total of 288.2 innings. He made 44 putouts, two assists with one error for a .979 fielding percentage. He retired at the end of that season.

He finished his major league career with a lifetime .295 batting average, 2,116 hits, 1,259 runs, 407 home runs, and 1,333 RBI. Defensively, he posted a .985 fielding percentage.

=== 1955 MVP balloting controversy ===
Snider finished second to teammate Roy Campanella in the 1955 Most Valuable Player (MVP) balloting conducted by the Baseball Writers' Association of America. He trailed Campanella by just five points, 226–221, with each man receiving eight first-place votes. A widely believed story, summarized in an article by columnist Tracy Ringolsby, holds that a hospitalized writer from Philadelphia had turned in a ballot with Campanella listed as his first-place and fifth-place vote. It was assumed that the writer had meant to write Snider's name into one of those slots. Unable to get a clarification from the ill writer, the BBWAA considered disallowing the ballot but decided to accept it, counting the first-place vote for Campanella and treating the fifth-place vote as though it had been left blank. Had the ballot been disallowed, the vote would have been won by Snider 221–212. Had Snider gotten the blank fifth-place vote, the final vote would have favored Snider 227–226.

Sportswriter Joe Posnanski, however, has suggested that this story is not entirely true. Posnanski writes that there was a writer who did leave Snider off his ballot and write in Campanella's name twice, but it was in first and sixth positions, not first and fifth. Had Snider received the sixth place vote, the final tally would have created a tie, not a win for Snider. Additionally, the position wasn't discarded — everyone lower on the ballot was moved up a spot, and pitcher Jack Meyer was inserted at the bottom with a 10th place vote.

Snider did win the Sporting News National League Player of the Year Award for 1955, and the Sid Mercer Award, emblematic of his selection by the New York branch of the BBWAA as the National League's best player of 1955.

== Later years ==
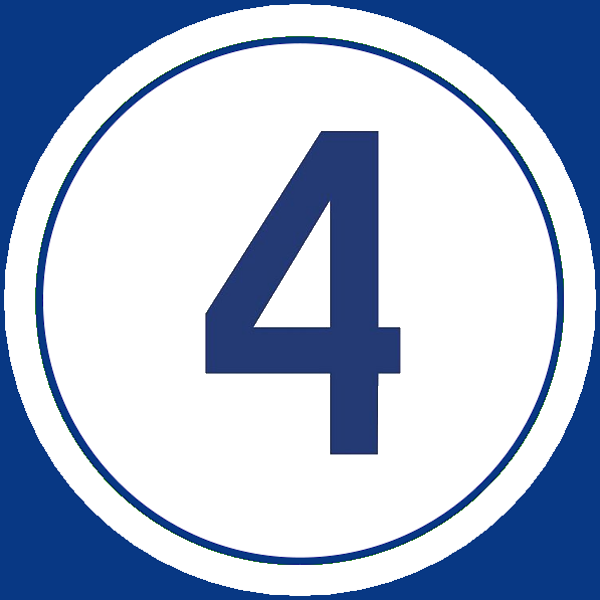
Duke Snider's number 4 was retired by the Los Angeles Dodgers in 1980.

Following his retirement from baseball, Snider became a popular and respected TV/radio analyst and play-by-play announcer for the San Diego Padres from 1969 to 1971 and for the Montreal Expos from 1973 to 1986. He was characterized by a mellow, low-key style.

Snider occasionally took acting roles, sometimes appearing in television or films as himself or as a professional baseball player. He played himself in "Hero Father" (1956) in the Robert Young television series Father Knows Best, made one guest appearance on the Chuck Connors television series The Rifleman, and played Wallace in The Retired Gun (1959). Other appearances include an uncredited part as a Los Angeles Dodgers center fielder in The Geisha Boy (1958), the Cranker in The Trouble with Girls (1969), and a Steamer Fan in Pastime (1990). As recently as 2007, he was featured in Brooklyn Dodgers: Ghosts of Flatbush.

In 1995, Snider and Willie McCovey pleaded guilty to federal tax fraud charges after they had failed to report income from sports card shows and memorabilia sales. Snider admitted to intentionally failing to report $100,000 of income between 1984 and 1993, and said he did it because he needed the money after failed investments depleted his savings. Snider paid $30,000 in back taxes and a $5,000 fine, and was sentenced to two years of probation. McCovey also paid a fine and was sentenced to probation. In 2017, President Barack Obama issued pardons for Snider and McCovey.

Snider was featured, along with Mickey Mantle and Willie Mays, in the 1981 song "Talkin' Baseball" by Terry Cashman.

== Personal life ==
Snider married Beverly Null in 1947; they had four children.

Snider died on February 27, 2011, at age 84 of an undisclosed illness at the Valle Vista Convalescent Hospital in Escondido, California. He was the last living Brooklyn Dodger who was on the field for the final out of the 1955 World Series.

== Legacy ==
He was elected to the Baseball Hall of Fame in 1980. That same year, in a ceremony at Dodger Stadium, Snider's jersery number 4 was retired by the Los Angeles Dodgers. In 1999, The Sporting News placed Snider at number 83 on their list of "100 Greatest Players". He was a nominee for the Major League Baseball All-Century Team.

In 2013, the Bob Feller Act of Valor Award honored Snider as one of 37 Baseball Hall of Fame members for his service in the United States Navy during World War II.

== MLB highlights ==
Some of Snider's MLB achievements:

- NL All-Star (1950–1956, 1963)
- NL MVP runner-up (1955)
- NL home run leader (1956)
- NL RBI leader (1955)
- NL leader in fielding average as center fielder (1951, 1952, 1955)
- World Series champion team (1955, 1959)
- Los Angeles Dodgers: career leader in home runs (389), RBI (1,271), strikeouts (1,123), and extra-base hits (814)
- Los Angeles Dodgers: single-season record holder for most intentional walks (26 in 1956)
- Only player to hit four home runs (or more) in two different World Series (1952, 1955)
- One of two players (besides Gil Hodges) with over 1,000 RBI during the 1950s
- Led MLB in RBI for the decade of the 1950s (1,031)
- Hit 19 home runs off of Robin Roberts; the all-time record for most home runs off of a single pitcher

== See also ==
- List of Los Angeles Dodgers team records
- List of Major League Baseball annual home run leaders
- List of Major League Baseball annual runs batted in leaders
- List of Major League Baseball annual runs scored leaders
- List of Major League Baseball career assists as a center fielder leaders
- List of Major League Baseball career extra base hits leaders
- List of Major League Baseball career fielding errors as a center fielder leaders
- List of Major League Baseball career games played as a center fielder leaders
- List of Major League Baseball career games played as an outfielder leaders
- List of Major League Baseball career hits leaders
- List of Major League Baseball career home run leaders
- List of Major League Baseball career intentional bases on balls leaders
- List of Major League Baseball career OPS leaders
- List of Major League Baseball career putouts as a center fielder leaders
- List of Major League Baseball career runs batted in leaders
- List of Major League Baseball career runs scored leaders
- List of Major League Baseball career slugging percentage leaders
- List of Major League Baseball career WAR leaders
- List of Major League Baseball home run records
- List of Major League Baseball progressive career home runs leaders
- Los Angeles Dodgers award winners and league leaders
