= Gary Pettis =

American baseball player and coach (born 1958)

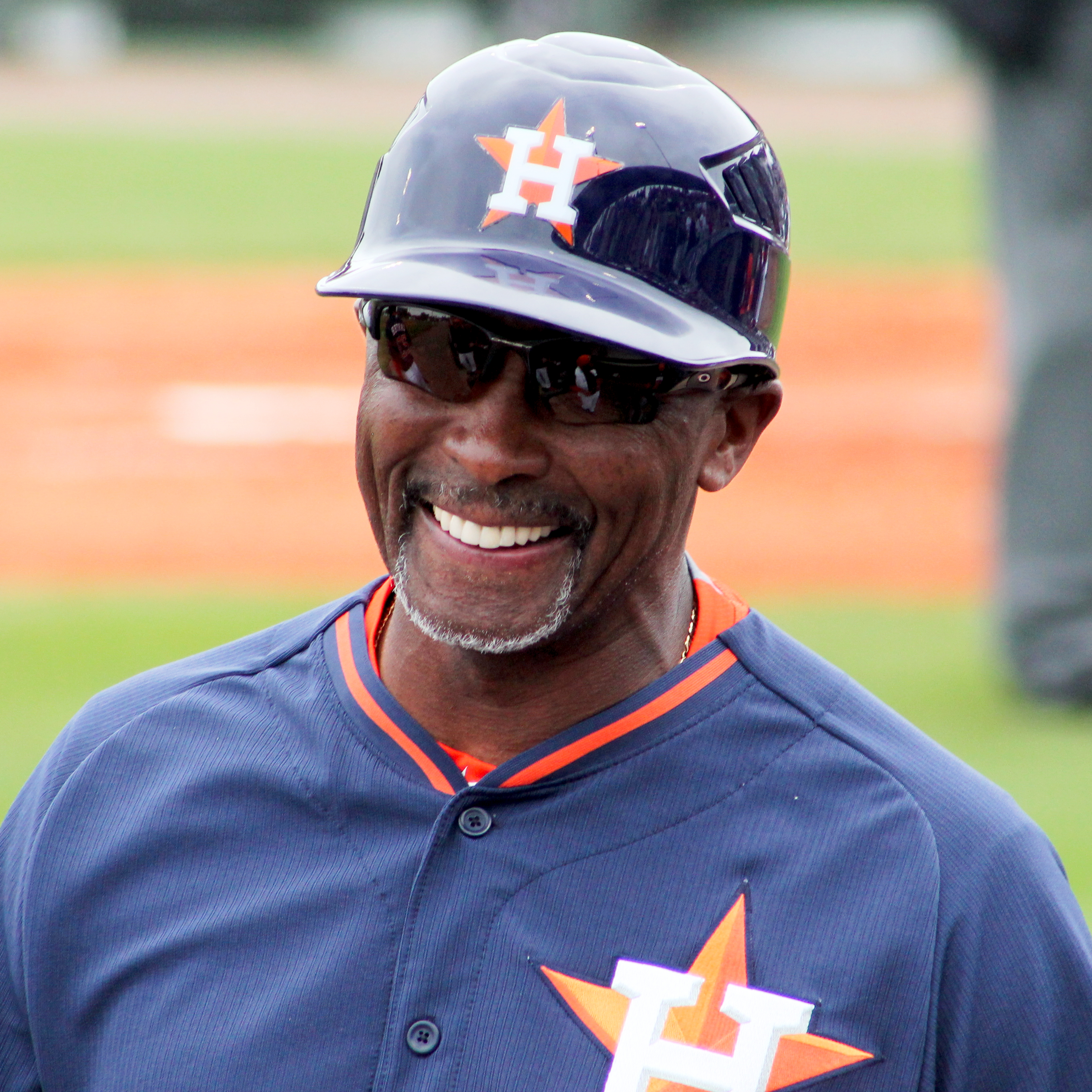
- Pettis with the Houston Astros

San Francisco Giants – No. 81
- Center fielder / Coach
- Born: April 3, 1958 (age 68); Oakland, California, U.S.
- Batted: Switch Threw: Right

MLB debut
- September 13, 1982, for the California Angels

Last MLB appearance
- September 10, 1992, for the Detroit Tigers

MLB statistics
- Batting average: .236
- Home runs: 21
- Runs batted in: 259
- Stolen bases: 354
- Stats at Baseball Reference

Teams
- As player: California Angels (1982–1987); Detroit Tigers (1988–1989); Texas Rangers (1990–1991); San Diego Padres (1992); Detroit Tigers (1992); As coach: California Angels (1995); Chicago White Sox (1997–2002); New York Mets (2003–2004); Texas Rangers (2007–2014); Houston Astros (2015–2024); San Francisco Giants (2026–present)

Career highlights and awards
- 2× World Series champion (2017, 2022); 5× Gold Glove Award (1985, 1986, 1988–1990)

Gary George Pettis (born April 3, 1958) is an American former professional baseball center fielder and third base coach for the San Francisco Giants of Major League Baseball (MLB). He played in MLB from 1982 to 1992 for the California Angels, Detroit Tigers, Texas Rangers, and San Diego Padres. Pettis won five Gold Glove Awards and finished in the top ten in stolen bases in the American League seven times.

== Career ==
Pettis attended Castlemont High School in Oakland, California. The California Angels selected Pettis in the 6th round of the 1979 draft, and he played minor league baseball for the Salinas Spurs of the class "A" California League in 1980, then the Holyoke Millers of the double "A" Eastern League in 1981. In 1982, Pettis was promoted to the California Angels, where he played the first six seasons of his career.

After the 1987 season, Pettis went on to play two seasons with the Detroit Tigers, 1988 through the following season of 1989. After two years with Detroit, Pettis joined the Texas Rangers for two seasons, 1990–91. Pettis finished his career in the major leagues in 1992. The 1992 season saw Pettis play for two teams. After leaving the Texas Rangers, Pettis joined the San Diego Padres for the 1992 season but ended that season back in Detroit with the Tigers.

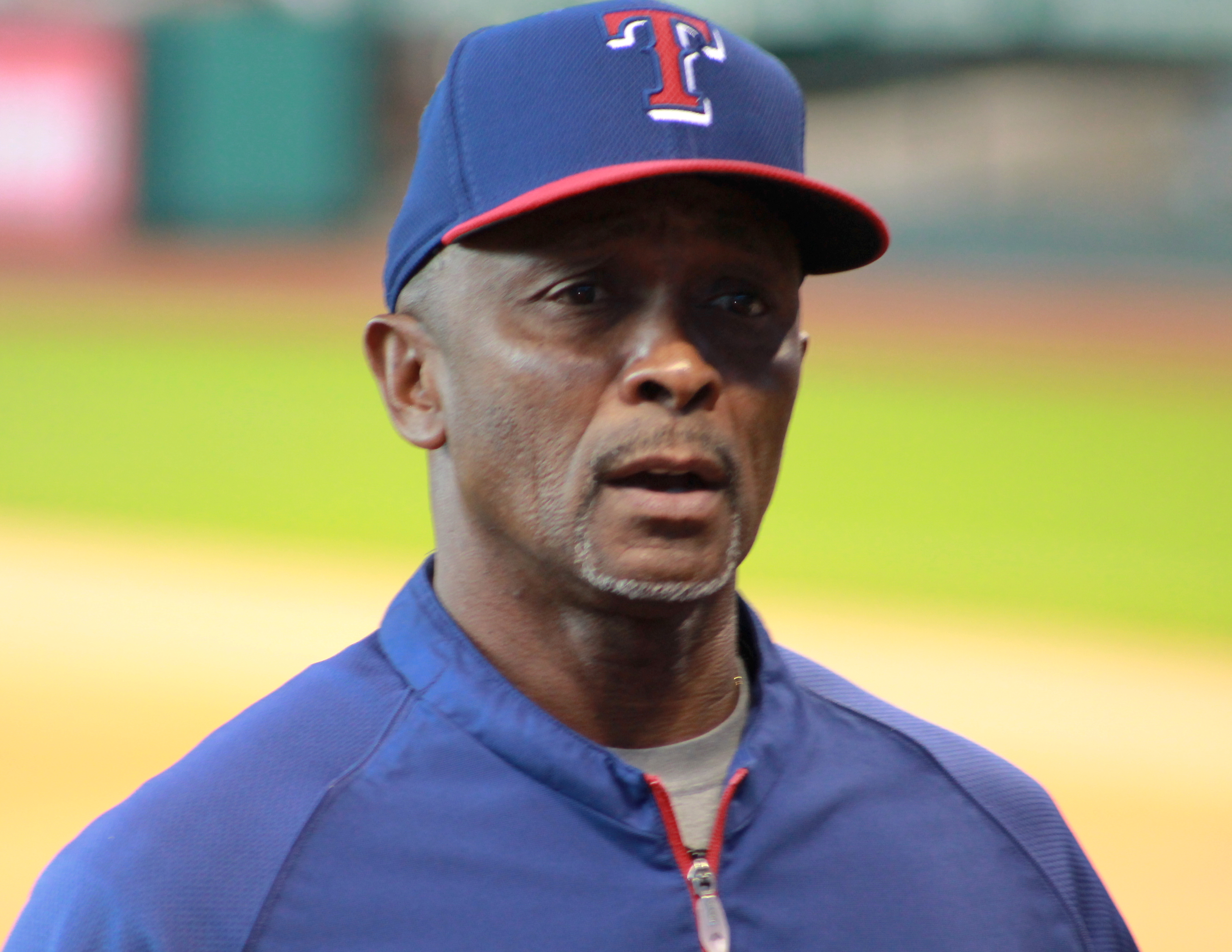
Pettis with the Texas Rangers in 2014

During his career, Pettis consistently hit for low averages and was known for striking out often, but he performed extremely well on defense, earning five Gold Glove Awards. He was noted for making many spectacular leaping or diving catches, depriving hitters of home runs or base hits, and was known in baseball circles as "The man who made center field look easy". Additionally, he was a prolific base runner and had five seasons where he stole over 40 bases. Pettis held the Angels' club record for stolen bases for nearly 20 years, until it was broken by Chone Figgins on July 15, 2007. Pettis was tagged as "Pac Man" Pettis by a local radio station listener call-in contest in 1986, referring to his unusual speed in the outfield and ability to chase down opponents' hits.

On his 1985 Topps baseball card, the person posing in the picture is not Pettis; it is in fact a picture of his younger brother, Lynn.

In 2022, the Astros won 106 games, the second-highest total in franchise history. They advanced to the World Series and defeated the Philadelphia Phillies in six games to give Pettis his second World Series title as an Astro. After the 2024 season, the Astros did not renew Pettis' contract for the 2025 season, ending his tenure with the club.

On June 2, 2026, the San Francisco Giants hired Pettis to be their third base coach.

== Personal life ==
His nephew, Austin Pettis, is a former wide receiver for the St. Louis Rams and San Diego Chargers. Pettis has four children, Paige, Kyler, Shaye, and Dante. Dante plays wide receiver for the New Orleans Saints and set the NCAA record for most career punt return touchdowns while at the University of Washington. Kyler is an actor who appeared on the NBC daytime drama Days of Our Lives. His brother Stacey Pettis was drafted 94th overall in the 4th round of the 1981 draft by the Pittsburgh Pirates, and played in the Pirates (1981–1984) and Angels (1985–1986) systems. Stacey has worked as a scout for the Seattle Mariners (2001–2016) and St. Louis Cardinals (2018–present).

== See also ==
- List of Major League Baseball career games played as a center fielder leaders
- List of Major League Baseball career putouts as a center fielder leaders
- List of Major League Baseball career stolen bases leaders

Sporting positions
Preceded by Pat Listach	Houston Astros third base coach 2015—2024	Succeeded by Tony Perezchica
Preceded by Ron Wotus (interim)	San Francisco Giants third base coach 2026—present	Succeeded by Incumbent
