= List of Major League Baseball career games played as an outfielder leaders =

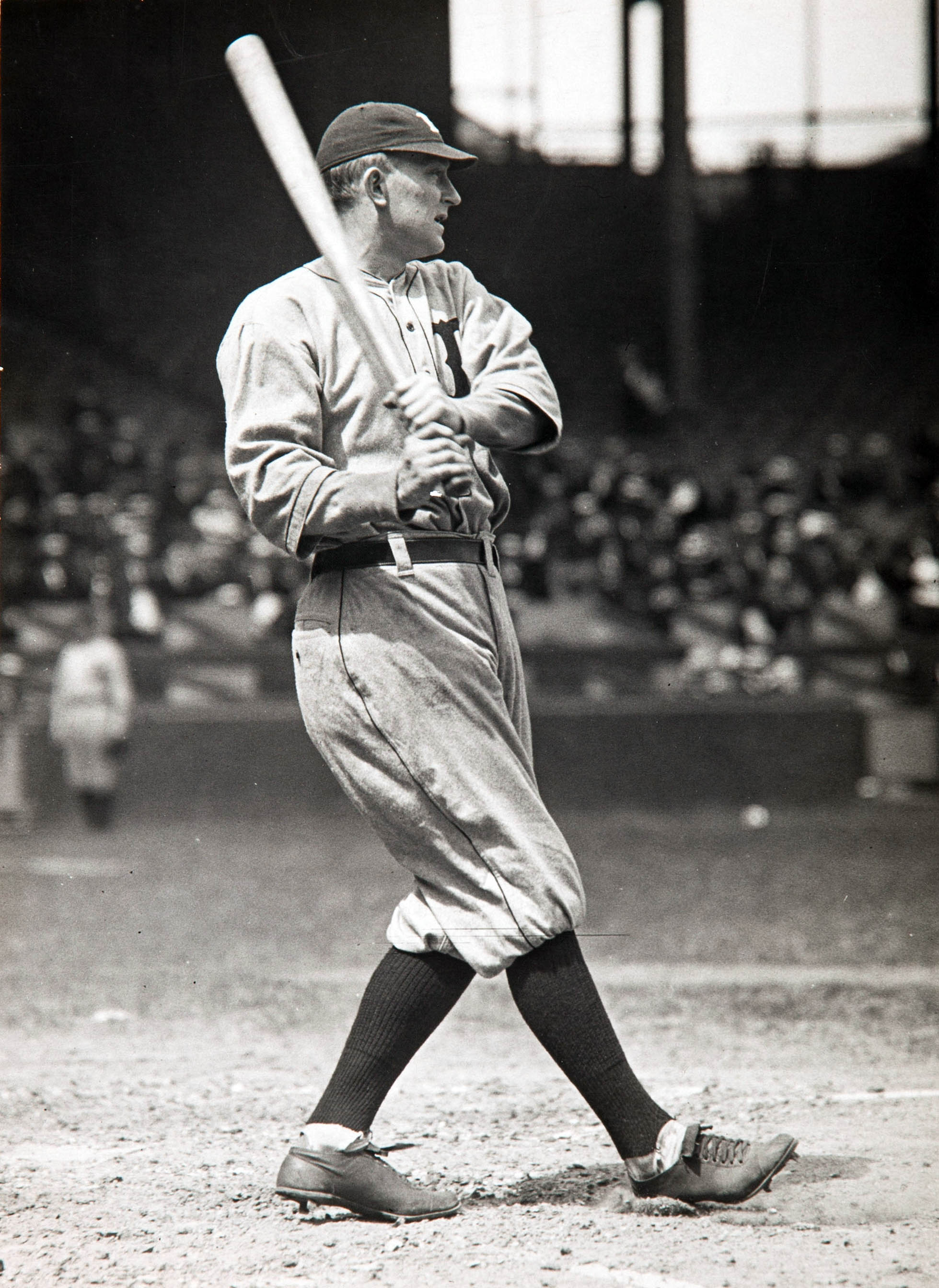
Ty Cobb, the all-time leader in games played as an outfielder

Games played (most often abbreviated as G or GP) is a statistic used in team sports to indicate the total number of games in which a player has participated (in any capacity); the statistic is generally applied irrespective of whatever portion of the game is contested. In baseball, the statistic applies also to players who, before a game, are included on a starting lineup card or are announced as ex ante substitutes, whether or not they play; however, in Major League Baseball, the application of this statistic does not extend to consecutive games played streaks. A starting pitcher, then, may be credited with a game played even if he is not credited with a game started or an inning pitched. An outfielder (OF) is a person playing in one of the three defensive positions in baseball farthest from the batter, who are identified as the left fielder (LF), the center fielder (CF), and the right fielder (RF). An outfielder's duty is to try to catch long fly balls before they hit the ground or to quickly catch or retrieve and return to the infield any other balls entering the outfield. Outfielders normally play behind the six other members of the defense who play in or near the infield; unlike catchers and most infielders (excepting first basemen), who are virtually exclusively right-handed, outfielders can be either right- or left-handed. In the scoring system used to record defensive plays, the outfielders are assigned the numbers 7 (left field), 8 (center field), and 9 (right field).

The outfield positions are routinely regarded as being among the less physically demanding positions in baseball, largely due to the rarity of contact with opposing players and the longer reaction time possible after a ball is hit; long careers in the outfield have been common throughout major league history. Because game accounts and box scores often did not distinguish between the outfield positions, there has been some difficulty in determining precise defensive statistics before 1901; because of this, and because of the similarity in their roles, defensive statistics for the three positions are frequently combined. Ty Cobb is the all-time leader in major league games played as an outfielder with 2,934. Barry Bonds (2,874), Willie Mays (2,842), Rickey Henderson (2,826), Hank Aaron (2,760), Tris Speaker (2,698), and Lou Brock (2,507) are the only other outfielders to play in over 2,500 games in their careers; 55 players have appeared in more than 2,000 career games as outfielders.

As of May 26, 2025, no active players are in the top 100 of career games played as an outfielder. The active leader is Andrew McCutchen in tied for 95th with 1,792.

== Key ==
**Rank**	Rank amongst leaders in career games played. A blank field indicates a tie.
**Player (2027 Gs)**	Number of games played during the 2027 Major League Baseball season
**Main pos.**	Primary outfield position played during career (LF, CF, or RF)
**MLB**	Total career games played as an outfielder in Major League Baseball
*	Denotes elected to National Baseball Hall of Fame
**Bold**	Denotes active player (Note: A player is considered inactive if he has announced his retirement or has not played for a full season.)

== List ==
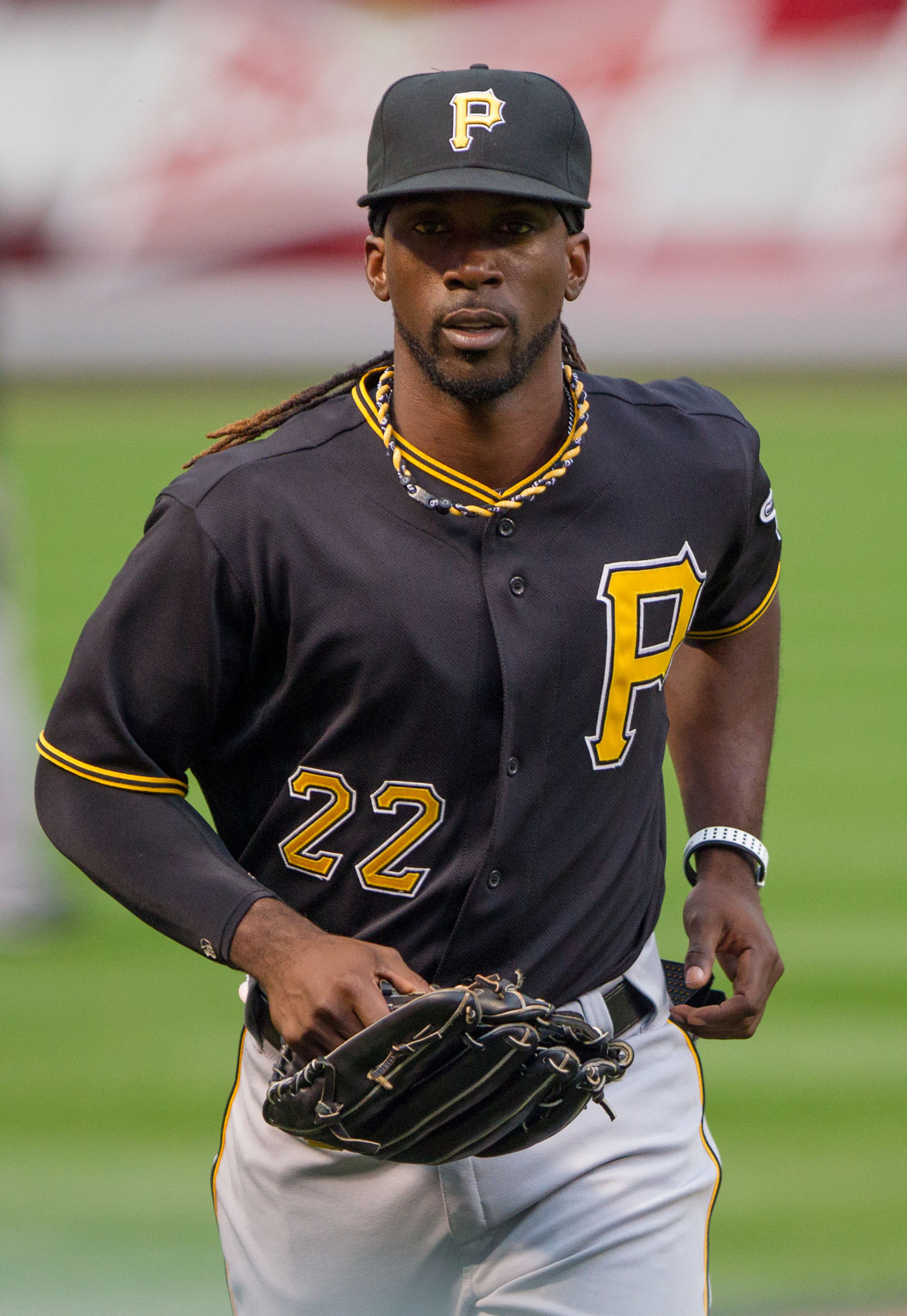
Andrew McCutchen, the active leader and tied for 95th all-time in games played as an outfielder.

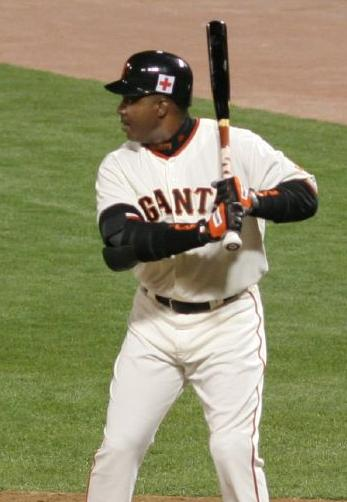
Barry Bonds holds the National League record.

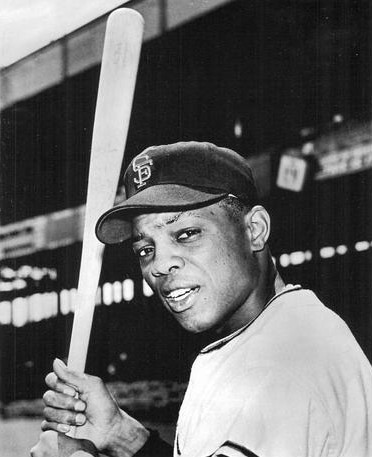
Willie Mays held the National League record for 38 years.

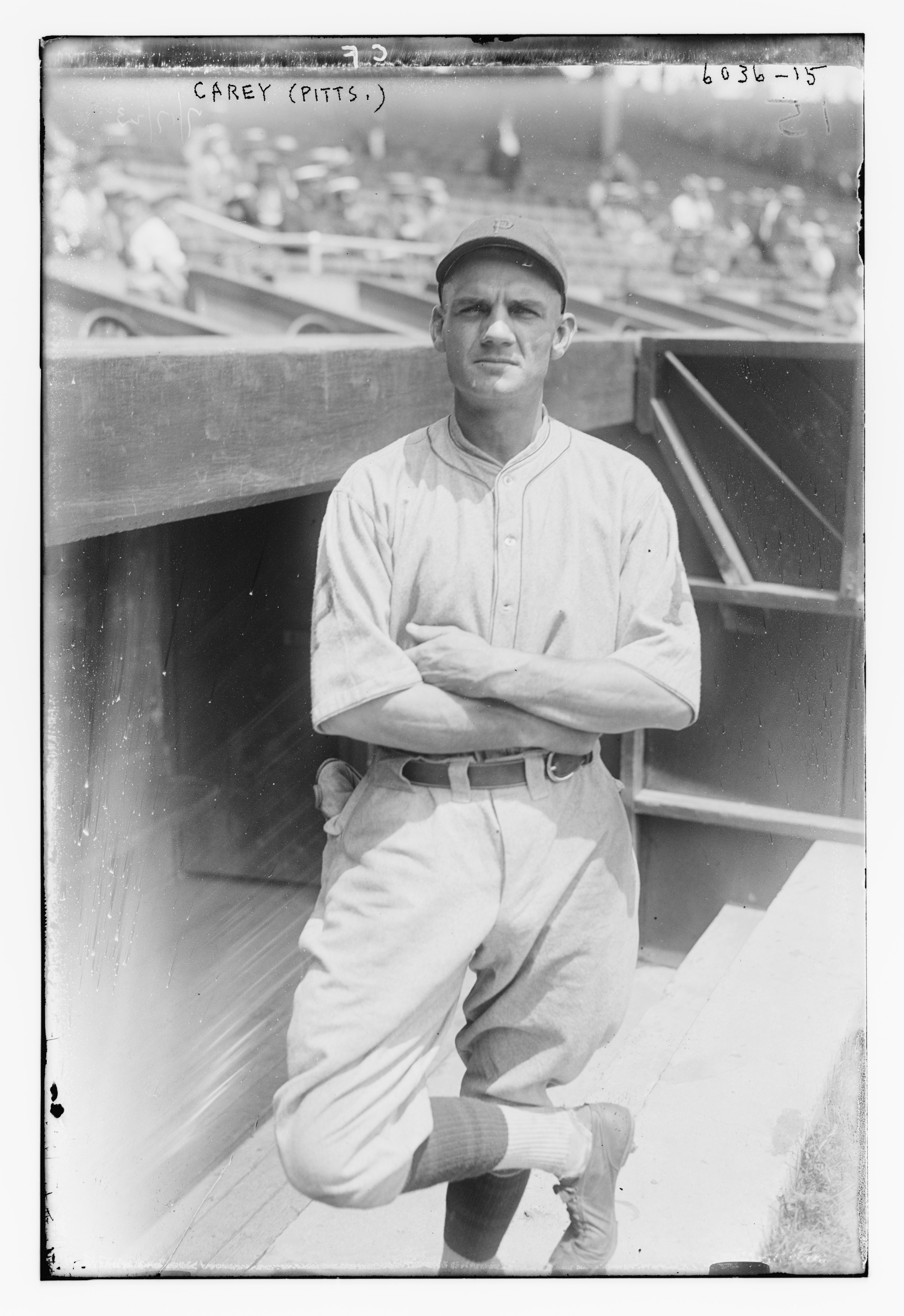
Max Carey held the National League record for 42 years.

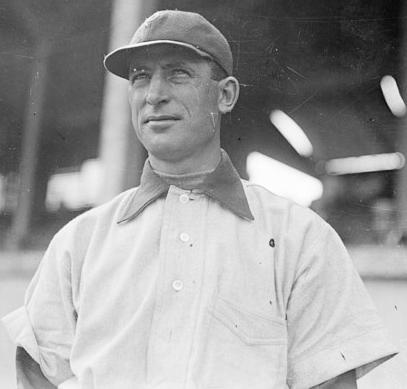
Fred Clarke, who held the National League record for 18 years, was the first player to appear in 2,000 games in the outfield.

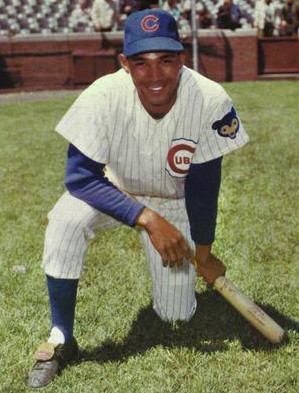
Billy Williams played a record 164 games in the outfield in 1965.

- Stats updated as of 2026 season.

Rank	Player (2027 Gs)	Main Pos.	Games as outfielder			Other leagues, notes
Rank	Player (2027 Gs)	Main Pos.	MLB	American League	National League	Other leagues, notes
1	Ty Cobb*	CF	2,934	2,934	0	
2	Barry Bonds	LF	2,874	0	2,874	
3	Willie Mays*	CF	2,842	0	2,842	Held National League record, 1969–2007; Negro League totals unavailable
4	Rickey Henderson*	LF	2,826	2,347	479	
5	Hank Aaron*	RF	2,760	4	2,756	
6	Tris Speaker*	CF	2,698	2,698	0	
7	Lou Brock*	LF	2,507	0	2,507	
8	Al Kaline*	RF	2,488	2,488	0	
9	Steve Finley	CF	2,487	313	2,174	
10	Dave Winfield*	RF	2,469	1,404	1,065	
11	Luis Gonzalez	LF	2,441	132	2,309	
12	Max Carey*	CF	2,421	0	2,421	Held National League record, 1927–1969
13	Vada Pinson	CF	2,403	728	1,675	
14	Ken Griffey Jr.*	CF	2,382	1,529	853	
15	Roberto Clemente*	RF	2,370	0	2,370	
16	Ichiro Suzuki*	RF	2,365	2,145	220	
17	Zack Wheat*	LF	2,337	62	2,275	Held National League record, 1926–1927
18	Tony Gwynn*	RF	2,326	0	2,326	
19	Willie Davis	CF	2,323	49	2,274	
	Andre Dawson*	RF	2,323	20	2,303	
21	Mel Ott*	RF	2,313	0	2,313	
22	Sam Crawford*	RF	2,299	1,906	393	Held major league record, 1915–1923; held American League record, 1911–1920
23	Paul Waner*	RF	2,288	0	2,288	
24	Harry Hooper*	RF	2,284	2,284	0	
25	Sam Rice*	RF	2,270	2,270	0	
26	Torii Hunter	CF	2,256	2,256	0	
27	Babe Ruth*	RF	2,241	2,215	26	
28	Carlos Beltrán*	CF	2,210	994	1,216	
29	Sammy Sosa	RF	2,203	397	1,806	
30	Fred Clarke*	LF	2,193	0	2,193	Held major league record, 1910–1915; held National League record, 1908–1926
31	Goose Goslin*	LF	2,187	2,187	0	
32	Brett Butler	CF	2,159	601	1,558	
33	José Cruz	LF	2,156	8	2,148	
34	Ted Williams*	LF	2,151	2,151	0	
35	Dwight Evans	RF	2,146	2,146	0	
36	Doc Cramer	CF	2,142	2,142	0	
	Al Simmons*	LF	2,142	2,055	87	
38	Bobby Abreu	RF	2,138	669	1,469	
39	Frank Robinson*	RF	2,132	759	1,373	
40	Tim Raines*	LF	2,123	771	1,352	
41	Nick Markakis	RF	2,107	1,343	764	
42	Richie Ashburn*	CF	2,104	0	2,104	
43	Reggie Jackson*	RF	2,102	2,102	0	
44	Marquis Grissom	CF	2,088	144	1,944	
	Billy Williams*	LF	2,088	1	2,087	
46	Carl Yastrzemski*	LF	2,076	2,076	0	
47	Jimmy Sheckard	LF	2,071	4	2,067	
48	Johnny Damon	CF	2,067	2,067	0	
49	Enos Slaughter*	RF	2,064	308	1,756	
50	Jesse Burkett*	LF	2,054	564	1,490	Held major league record, 1905–1910
51	Andruw Jones*	CF	2,043	229	1,814	
52	Kenny Lofton	CF	2,041	1,502	539	
53	Willie Keeler*	RF	2,039	849	1,190	
54	Willie Wilson	CF	2,031	1,939	92	
55	Mickey Mantle*	CF	2,019	2,019	0	
56	Willie McGee	CF	1,979	92	1,887	
57	Jimmy Ryan	CF	1,945	234	1,593	Includes 118 in Players' League; held major league record, 1902–1905; held National League record, 1898–1902
58	Manny Ramirez	LF	1,939	1,739	200	
59	Paul O'Neill	RF	1,932	1,221	711	
60	Amos Otis	CF	1,928	1,845	83	
61	Chet Lemon	CF	1,925	1,925	0	
62	Bernie Williams	CF	1,924	1,924	0	
63	Mike Cameron	CF	1,921	967	954	
64	Duke Snider*	CF	1,918	0	1,918	
65	Garret Anderson	LF	1,913	1,755	158	
66	Clyde Milan	CF	1,903	1,903	0	
67	Curtis Granderson	CF	1,897	1,230	667	
68	Stan Musial*	LF	1,890	0	1,890	
69	George Foster	LF	1,880	11	1,869	
70	Paul Blair	CF	1,878	1,811	67	
71	Gary Matthews	LF	1,876	0	1,876	
72	Jim Edmonds	CF	1,867	654	1,213	
	Dave Parker*	RF	1,867	35	1,832	
	Devon White	CF	1,867	1,245	622	
75	Moisés Alou	LF	1,864	0	1,864	
76	Sherry Magee	LF	1,861	0	1,861	
77	Dale Murphy	CF	1,853	0	1,853	
78	Joe Medwick*	LF	1,851	0	1,851	
79	Edd Roush*	CF	1,848	2	1,659	Includes 187 in Federal League
80	Heinie Manush*	LF	1,845	1,709	136	
81	George Burns	LF	1,844	0	1,844	
82	Dusty Baker	LF	1,842	90	1,752	
83	Del Ennis	LF	1,840	25	1,815	
84	George Van Haltren	CF	1,833	0	1,685	Includes 81 in American Association, 67 in Players' League; held National League record, 1902–1908
85	Juan Pierre	CF	1,831	304	1,527	
86	Fred Lynn	CF	1,825	1,770	55	
87	Lloyd Waner*	CF	1,818	0	1,818	
	Cy Williams	CF	1,818	0	1,818	
89	Patsy Donovan	RF	1,816	122	1,572	Includes 122 in American Association
90	George Hendrick	RF	1,813	783	1,030	
91	Jimmy Wynn	CF	1,810	25	1,785	
92	Kiki Cuyler*	RF	1,807	0	1,807	
93	Larry Walker*	RF	1,804	0	1,804	
94	Dummy Hoy	CF	1,796	132	1,403	Includes 139 in American Association, 122 in Players' League
95	**Andrew McCutchen (0)**	CF	1,792	36	1,756	
	Wally Moses	RF	1,792	1,792	0	
97	Tom Brown	CF	1,788	0	1,049	Includes 608 in American Association, 131 in Players' League; held major league record, 1895–1902
98	Justin Upton	LF	1,787	629	1,158	
99	Melky Cabrera	LF	1,784	1,439	345	
100	Adam Jones	CF	1,783	1,653	130	

== Other Hall of Famers ==
Player	Main Pos.	Games as outfielder			Other leagues, notes
Player	Main Pos.	MLB	American League	National League	Other leagues, notes
Joe DiMaggio*	CF	1,721	1,721	0	
Kirby Puckett*	CF	1,696	1,696	0	
Hugh Duffy*	CF	1,682	77	1,344	Includes 137 in Players' League, 124 in American Association
Minnie Miñoso*	LF	1,665	1,638	27	Negro League totals unavailable
Vladimir Guerrero*	RF	1,608	616	992	
Chuck Klein*	RF	1,600	0	1,600	
Harry Heilmann*	RF	1,594	1,488	106	
Earl Averill*	CF	1,590	1,586	4	
Billy Hamilton*	CF	1,587	0	1,415	Includes 172 in American Association
Jim Rice*	LF	1,543	1,543	0	
Joe Kelley*	LF	1,465	48	1,417	
Elmer Flick*	RF	1,456	922	534	
Jim O'Rourke*	LF	1,443	0	1,266	Includes 111 in Players' League, 66 in National Association
Larry Doby*	CF	1,440	1,440	0	Negro League totals unavailable
Sam Thompson*	RF	1,410	8	1,402	
Earle Combs*	CF	1,387	1,387	0	
Ralph Kiner*	LF	1,382	87	1,295	
Ed Delahanty*	LF	1,346	151	1,177	Includes 18 in Players' League
Willie Stargell*	LF	1,296	0	1,296	
Hack Wilson*	CF	1,257	0	1,257	
Ned Hanlon*	CF	1,254	0	1,133	Includes 121 in Players' League
Robin Yount*	CF	1,218	1,218	0	
Ross Youngs*	RF	1,199	0	1,199	
Tommy McCarthy*	RF	1,188	0	655	Includes 485 in American Association, 48 in Union Association
Chick Hafey*	LF	1,185	0	1,185	
Casey Stengel*	RF	1,183	0	1,183	
Tony Oliva*	RF	1,178	1,178	0	
