= Carlos Monasterios =

Venezuelan baseball player (born 1986)

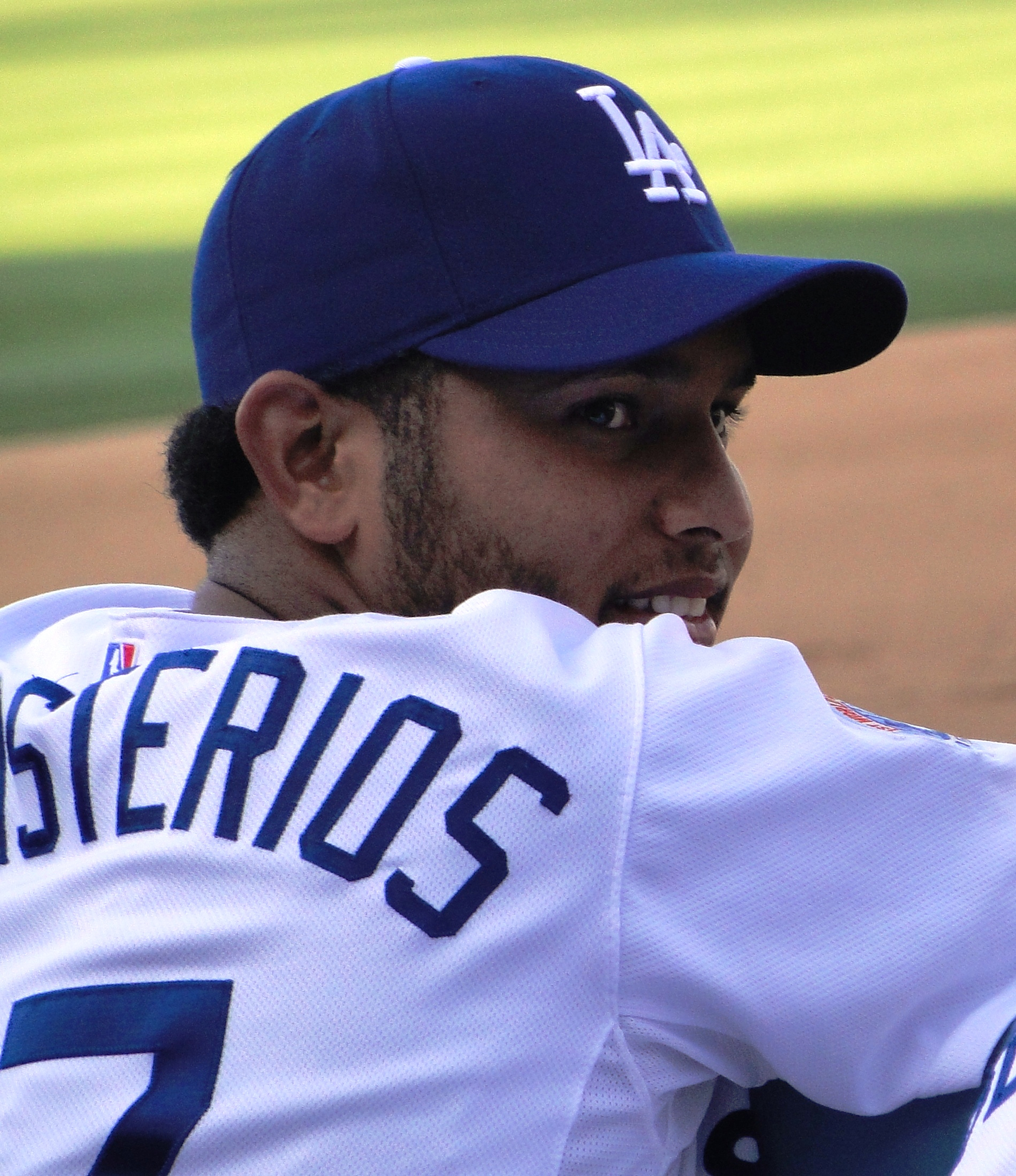
- Monasterios with the Los Angeles Dodgers
- Pitcher
- Born: March 21, 1986 (age 39); Miranda, Venezuela
- Batted: Right Threw: Right

MLB debut
- April 5, 2010, for the Los Angeles Dodgers

Last MLB appearance
- September 29, 2010, for the Los Angeles Dodgers

MLB statistics
- Win–loss record: 3–5
- Earned run average: 4.38
- Strikeouts: 52
- Stats at Baseball Reference

Teams
- Los Angeles Dodgers (2010)

Carlos Monasterios Hernández (born March 21, 1986) is a Venezuelan former right-handed professional baseball pitcher. He played with the Los Angeles Dodgers of Major League Baseball (MLB) in 2010.

== Career ==
=== New York Yankees/Philadelphia Phillies ===
The New York Yankees signed Monasterios as a free agent in 2004. On July 30, 2006, the Yankees traded Montasterios, Matt Smith, and C. J. Henry for Bobby Abreu and Cory Lidle.

With the Clearwater Threshers in 2009 he was selected to the Florida State League mid-season All-Star team.

=== Los Angeles Dodgers ===
Monasterios was selected by the New York Mets in the Rule 5 draft after the 2009 season and promptly traded to the Los Angeles Dodgers, who added him to their 25-man roster.

He made his Major League debut on April 5, 2010 against the Pittsburgh Pirates, working a scoreless inning of relief. His first career victory came in a 13 inning game against the Washington Nationals on April 24. His first Major League start was on May 1, 2010 against the Pittsburgh Pirates, allowing one run in four innings of work. He remained on the Dodgers major league roster all season, appearing in 32 games and making 13 starts. For the season, he pitched 88.1 innings with a record of 3-5, a 4.38 ERA and 52 strikeouts.

He was assigned to the AAA Albuquerque Isotopes to start the 2011 season. However, he only made one start for the Isotopes, pitching 4 innings and allowing 6 runs. He was placed on the disabled list after that start with elbow inflammation and on July 15, he underwent Tommy John surgery, shutting him down for the season. On November 18, 2011 he was outrighted to the minors and removed from the 40 man roster.

He encountered further arm problems when he reported for spring training in 2012 and had a surgery in March to relocate the ulnar nerve. The Dodgers released him on April 8.

=== Attempted comeback ===
After missing most of 2011 and all of 2012 due to injuries, he returned in 2013 to play for the El Paso Diablos of the American Association of Independent Professional Baseball. In 2014, he was with the Guerreros de Oaxaca of the Mexican League.

== See also ==
- List of Major League Baseball players from Venezuela
- Rule 5 draft results
