= Coolflo =

Batting helmet

The Coolflo is a batting helmet designed by Rawlings and first put into regular use during the 2006 Major League Baseball season. The helmet is designed to allow air to flow through for a more comfortable feel for the hitter. It was previewed during the 2005 All-Star Game before being put into regular use. The new helmet was worn by eight teams (Chicago Cubs, Los Angeles Dodgers, Anaheim Angels, New York Mets, Tampa Bay Devil Rays, Arizona Diamondbacks, Atlanta Braves, and Baltimore Orioles) in 2006 and is now available to all 30 MLB Clubs since 2007. Individual players have the option to wear the new design, but are not required to do so. As of 2008 there are only four teams who do not have at least one player wearing the helmet: Boston Red Sox, Cleveland Indians, New York Yankees, and Washington Nationals.

The Chicago Cubs abandoned the Coolflo helmets in 2009 because too many of them were breaking.
