= 2009–10 Kansas Jayhawks men's basketball team =

American college basketball season

2009–10 Kansas Jayhawks men's basketball

Big 12 tournament champions Big 12 regular season champions

NCAA tournament, Round of 32
- Conference: Big 12
- North

Ranking
- Coaches: No. 6
- AP: No. 1
- Record: 33–3 (15–1 Big 12)
- Head coach: Bill Self (7th season)
- Assistant coaches: Joe Dooley (7th season); Danny Manning (3rd season); Kurtis Townsend (6th season)
- Captains: Cole Aldrich; Sherron Collins
- Home arena: Allen Fieldhouse

2009–10 Big 12 men's basketball standings
	Conf.				Overall
Team	W		L	PCT	W		L	PCT
No. 1 Kansas†	15	–	1	.938	33	–	3	.917
No. 7 Kansas State	11	–	5	.688	29	–	8	.784
No. 19 Baylor	11	–	5	.688	28	–	8	.778
No. 23 Texas A&M	11	–	5	.688	24	–	10	.706
Missouri	10	–	6	.625	23	–	11	.676
Texas	9	–	7	.563	24	–	10	.706
Oklahoma State	9	–	7	.563	22	–	11	.667
Colorado	6	–	10	.375	15	–	16	.484
Texas Tech	4	–	12	.250	19	–	16	.543
Iowa State	4	–	12	.250	15	–	17	.469
Oklahoma	4	–	12	.250	13	–	18	.419
Nebraska	2	–	14	.125	15	–	18	.455
† 2010 Big 12 Tournament winner Rankings from AP poll

The 2009–10 Kansas Jayhawks men's basketball team represented the University of Kansas in the 2009–10 NCAA Division I men's basketball season, which was the Jayhawks' 112th basketball season. Their head coach was Bill Self, who was serving his 7th year. The team played its home games in Allen Fieldhouse in Lawrence, Kansas and are members of the Big 12 Conference. The Jayhawks finished the season 33–3, 15–1 in Big 12 play to capture the Big 12 regular season championship. They also won the 2010 Big 12 men's basketball tournament to earn the conference's automatic bid to the 2010 NCAA Division I men's basketball tournament. They earned the #1 overall seed in the entire tournament and were the 1 seed in the Midwest Region. They defeated 16 seed Lehigh in the first round and were upset by 9 seed Northern Iowa in the second round.

== Pre-season ==
On April 13, 2009, key players Sherron Collins and Cole Aldrich announced that they would forgo the NBA draft and return for the 2009–10 season. The Jayhawks will return all players who saw significant minutes on last years Sweet 16 team. In early polls for the season, The Jayhawks were almost the consensus #1 ranked team for the 09–10 season, the only other team that was #1 in any other pre-season polls, was Michigan State, which defeated KU in the Sweet 16 of the 2009 NCAA tournament.

=== Departures ===
In the offseason the Jayhawks lost Senior walk-ons Matt Kleinmann and Brennan Bechard from the 2008–09 roster. On April 9, Quintrell Thomas and Tyrone Appleton announced their intention to transfer to other schools due to lack of available playing time. Appleton averaged 0.8 points on 2.2 minutes per game in 2008–09 and Thomas averaged 1.5 points on 5.4 minutes.

Thomas announced that he will be joining the UNLV squad, however will not be eligible to play until the 2010–11 season. Appleton transferred to Southwest Baptist University in Missouri.

=== Recruiting ===
In October 2008, the Jayhawks received commitments from a pair of five-star recruits, Elijah Johnson from North Las Vegas and Thomas Robinson of Washington, D.C. On Thursday April 23, 2009 McDonald's All-American Xavier Henry of Oklahoma City announced his intention to play at Kansas, prompting ESPN to name the Jayhawks as "the team to beat in 2010." The Jayhawks will add center Jeff Withey, who transferred from the University of Arizona, and C.J. Henry who will transfer from the University of Memphis to join his brother Xavier. C.J. will walk on as his tuition is paid by the New York Yankees who took him in the 2005 MLB Draft. Withey will not be eligible to play until the end of the fall semester.

==== Class of 2009 ====
College recruiting information
Name	Hometown	School	Height	Weight	Commit date
Xavier Henry; SG	Oklahoma City, OK	Putnam City HS	6 ft 6 in (1.98 m)	210 lb (95 kg)	Apr 23, 2009
Xavier Henry; SG	Recruit ratings: Scout: Rivals: (98)				
Elijah Johnson; SG	North Las Vegas, NV	Cheyenne HS	6 ft 2 in (1.88 m)	180 lb (82 kg)	Oct 19, 2008
Elijah Johnson; SG	Recruit ratings: Scout: Rivals: (95)				
Thomas Robinson; PF	Wolfeboro, NH	Brewster Academy	6 ft 8 in (2.03 m)	218 lb (99 kg)	Oct 10, 2008
Thomas Robinson; PF	Recruit ratings: Scout: Rivals: (93)				
Overall Recruiting Rankings: Scout – 4 Rivals – 6 ESPN – 5

==== Transfers ====
College recruiting information
Name	Hometown	School	Height	Weight	Commit date
Jeff Withey; C	San Diego, CA	Horizon Jr Sr HS	6 ft 11 in (2.11 m)	215 lb (98 kg)	Transfer
Jeff Withey; C	Recruit ratings: Scout: Rivals: (96)				
C. J. Henry; SG	Oklahoma City, OK	Putnam City HS	6 ft 3 in (1.91 m)	200 lb (91 kg)	Transfer
C. J. Henry; SG	Recruit ratings: Scout: Rivals: (N/A)				

=== Accolades ===
Team:

- Big 12 Preseason #1 (unanimous)
- Blue Ribbon Yearbook preseason #1 team
- Sporting News preseason #1.
- Associated Press Preseason #1
- ESPN/USAToday Preseason #1

Sherron Collins:

- Big 12 Preseason Co-Player of the Year
- John R. Wooden All-American and player of the year candidate
- Blue Ribbon Yearbook preseason all-American team candidate
- Associated Press preseason All-American

Cole Aldrich:

- Big 12 Preseason Co-Player of the Year
- John R. Wooden All-American and player of the year candidate
- Blue Ribbon Yearbook preseason player of the year candidate.
- Associated Press preseason All-American

== Season summary ==
=== Highlights ===
- Bill Self gained his 400th career victory with a 73–59 win over Iowa State on Feb. 13, 2010.
- Bill Self gained his 100th win over a Big 12 opponent as coach of the Jayhawks with a 59–54 win over Texas A&M on Feb. 15, 2010. Self achieved the milestone in less than 7 seasons and in 121 games played.
- Cole Aldrich broke Greg Ostertag's single season block record of 97. Aldrich had 98 as of Feb. 15, 2010.
- Sherron Collins set the record for winningest Jayhawk in a four-year span with his 124th win, an 81–68 victory over Oklahoma on Feb. 22, 2010. Breaking the previous record of 123 set by Raef LaFrentz, Billy Thomas and C.B. McGrath.
- Kansas won their sixth consecutive Big 12 Championship, a feat that hadn't been accomplished in a BCS conference since John Wooden's UCLA teams of the 1960-70's.
- Kansas claimed their 2,000th program victory on March 11, 2010, when they defeated Texas Tech in the Big 12 tournament. They now rank 2nd in overall Division I wins, behind only Kentucky.
- Bill Self scored his 200th win as Kansas head coach on March 12, 2010, when they defeated Texas A&M in the Big 12 tournament, the fastest to reach that mark in KU history.
- The Jayhawks won the Big 12 tournament championship on March 13, by defeating Kansas State 72–64 and improving their record to 32–2. The following day, they became the #1 overall seed in the NCAA Tournament.

=== Awards ===
Cole Aldrich

- Consensus Second Team All-American
- NABC Second Team All-American
- USBWA Second Team All-American
- AP Third Team All-American
- ESPN and CoSIDA Academic All-American of the Year
- Academic All-Big 12 First Team
- Big 12 Defensive Player of the Year
- All-Big 12 First Team
- All-Big 12 Defensive Team
- AP Big 12 First Team
- USBWA All-District VI Team
- Yahoo! Sports Third Team All-American
- Foxsports.com Third Team All-American

Sherron Collins

- Consensus First Team All-American
- NABC First Team All-American
- USBWA First Team All-American
- AP Second Team All-American
- Sporting News Second Team All-American
- All-Big 12 First Team
- AP Big 12 First Team
- USBWA All-District VI Team
- Yahoo! Sports Second Team All-American
- Foxsports.com Second Team All-American
- Frances Pomeroy Naismith Award
- Lute Olson Award
- NABC Senior Achievement Award

Xavier Henry

- All-Big 12 Rookie Team
- All-Big 12 Honorable Mention
- Sporting News All-Freshman Team
- USBWA All-District VI Team
- Foxsports.com All-Freshman Team

Marcus Morris

- All-Big 12 Second Team
- AP Big 12 Honorable Mention
- Yahoo! Sports Most Improved Player of the Year

Tyrel Reed

- Academic All-Big 12 First Team

== Roster ==
2009–10 Kansas Jayhawks men's basketball team
Players
Coaches

Pos.	#	Name	Height	Weight	Year	Hometown
F	0	Thomas Robinson	6 ft 9 in (2.06 m)	230 lb (104 kg)	Fr	Washington, D.C.
G	1	Xavier Henry	6 ft 6 in (1.98 m)	220 lb (100 kg)	Fr	Oklahoma City, Oklahoma
G	2	Conner Teahan	6 ft 5 in (1.96 m)	210 lb (95 kg)	Jr	Leawood, Kansas
G	4	Sherron Collins (C)	5 ft 11 in (1.8 m)	205 lb (93 kg)	Sr	Chicago, Illinois
C	5	Jeff Withey	7 ft 0 in (2.13 m)	225 lb (102 kg)	Fr	San Diego, California
G	10	Tyshawn Taylor	6 ft 3 in (1.91 m)	180 lb (82 kg)	So	Hoboken, New Jersey
G	12	Brady Morningstar	6 ft 3 in (1.91 m)	185 lb (84 kg)	RS Jr	Lawrence, Kansas
G	13	C. J. Henry	6 ft 4 in (1.93 m)	205 lb (93 kg)	RS Fr	Oklahoma City, Oklahoma
G	14	Tyrel Reed	6 ft 3 in (1.91 m)	185 lb (84 kg)	Jr	Burlington, Kansas
G	15	Elijah Johnson	6 ft 2 in (1.88 m)	183 lb (83 kg)	Fr	North Las Vegas, Nevada
C	21	Markieff Morris	6 ft 9 in (2.06 m)	232 lb (105 kg)	So	Philadelphia, Pennsylvania
F	22	Marcus Morris	6 ft 8 in (2.03 m)	225 lb (102 kg)	So	Philadelphia, Pennsylvania
G	23	Mario Little (redshirt)	6 ft 5 in (1.96 m)	210 lb (95 kg)	Sr	Chicago, Illinois
G	24	Travis Releford (redshirt)	6 ft 5 in (1.96 m)	205 lb (93 kg)	So	Shawnee Mission, Kansas
G	40	Jordan Juenemann	6 ft 4 in (1.93 m)	195 lb (88 kg)	So	Hays, Kansas
G	41	Chase Buford	6 ft 3 in (1.91 m)	210 lb (95 kg)	Jr	San Antonio, Texas
C	45	Cole Aldrich (C)	6 ft 11 in (2.11 m)	245 lb (111 kg)	Jr	Bloomington, Minnesota

Head coach

- Bill Self (Oklahoma State)

Assistant coach(es)

- Danny Manning (Kansas)
- Joe Dooley (George Washington)
- Kurtis Townsend (Western Kentucky)

Legend

- (C) Team captain
- (S) Suspended
- (I) Ineligible
- (W) Walk-on
- Injured
- Current redshirt

Roster
Last update: 2009-11-13

== Schedule ==
Date time, TV	Rank^{#}	Opponent^{#}	Result	Record	High points	High rebounds	High assists	Site (attendance) city, state
Exhibition
11/03/09*; 7:05 pm, Jayhawk; Network	No. 1	Fort Hays State	W 107–68	–	19 – Collins	13 – Aldrich	5 – Taylor	Allen Fieldhouse (16,300); Lawrence, KS
11/10/09*; 7:00 pm, Jayhawk; Network	No. 1	Pittsburg State	W 103–45	–	17 – Robinson	10 – Mk. Morris	5 – Collins	Allen Fieldhouse (16,300); Lawrence, KS
Regular season
11/13/09*; 7:00 pm, Jayhawk; Network	No. 1	Hofstra	W 101–65	1–0	27 – X. Henry	8 – Aldrich	6 – Taylor	Allen Fieldhouse (16,300); Lawrence, KS
11/17/09*; 9:00 pm, ESPN	No. 1	vs. Memphis; Hall of Fame Showcase	W 57–55	2–0	18 – Aldrich	11 – Aldrich	5 – Taylor	Scottrade Center (12,107); St. Louis, MO
11/19/09*; 7:00 pm, Jayhawk; Network	No. 1	Central Arkansas	W 94–44	3–0	12 – (4 Tied)	11 – Robinson	3 – (3 Tied)	Allen Fieldhouse (16,300); Lawrence, KS
11/25/09*; 7:00 pm, Jayhawk; Network	No. 1	Oakland	W 89–59	4–0	19 – (2 Tied)	11 – Mc. Morris	7 – Collins	Allen Fieldhouse (16,300); Lawrence, KS
11/27/09*; 7:00 pm, Jayhawk; Network	No. 1	Tennessee Tech	W 112–75	5–0	18 – Taylor	10 – Aldrich	5 – (2 Tied)	Allen Fieldhouse (16,300); Lawrence, KS
12/02/09*; 7:00 pm, Jayhawk; Network	No. 1	Alcorn State	W 98–31	6–0	18 – (2 Tied)	16 – Aldrich	9 – Johnson	Allen Fieldhouse (16,300); Lawrence, KS
12/06/09*; 4:30 pm, FSN	No. 1	at UCLA; Big 12/Pac-10 Hardwood Series	W 73–61	7–0	19 – Mk. Morris	12 – Aldrich	4 – Collins	Pauley Pavilion (10,451); Los Angeles
12/09/09*; 7:00 pm, ESPN U	No. 1	Radford	W 99–64	8–0	15 – (2 Tied)	9 – Aldrich	8 – Collins	Allen Fieldhouse (16,300); Lawrence, KS
12/12/09*; 1:00 pm, ESPN	No. 1	vs. La Salle; M&I Bank Kansas City Shootout	W 90–65	9–0	31 – X. Henry	12 – Mk. Morris	6 – (2 Tied)	Sprint Center (18,830); Kansas City, MO
12/19/09*; 11:00 am, ESPN	No. 1	Michigan; The ESPN Green Game	W 75–64	10–0	23 – Mc. Morris	11 – Aldrich	5 – Taylor	Allen Fieldhouse (16,300); Lawrence, KS
12/22/09*; 8:00 pm, ESPN2	No. 1	California	W 84–69	11–0	17 – Collins	10 – Aldrich	7 – (2 Tied)	Allen Fieldhouse (16,300); Lawrence, KS
12/29/09*; 8:00 pm, ESPNU	No. 1	Belmont	W 81–51	12–0	14 – Mc. Morris	14 – Aldrich	5 – (2 Tied)	Allen Fieldhouse (16,300); Lawrence, KS
01/02/10*; 4:30 pm, ESPN 2	No. 1	at No. 18 Temple	W 84–52	13–0	15 – X. Henry	10 – Aldrich	5 – Morningstar	Liacouras Center (10,206); Philadelphia, PA
01/06/10*; 7:00 pm, Jayhawk; Network	No. 1	Cornell	W 71–66	14–0	33 – Collins	9 – Aldrich	3 – (2 Tied)	Allen Fieldhouse (16,300); Lawrence, KS
01/10/10*; 3:30 pm, CBS	No. 1	at No. 16 Tennessee	L 68–76	14–1	22 – Collins	18 – Aldrich	5 – Collins	Thompson-Boling Arena (21,936); Knoxville, TN
01/13/10; 8:00 pm, ESPN 2	No. 3	at Nebraska	W 84–72	15–1 (1–0)	22 – Collins	9 – Aldrich	5 – Collins	Bob Devaney Sports Center (12,510); Lincoln, NE
01/16/10; 12:45 pm, Big 12	No. 3	Texas Tech	W 89–63	16–1 (2–0)	20 – Mc. Morris	8 – Mc. Morris	5 – X. Henry	Allen Fieldhouse (16,300); Lawrence, KS
01/20/10; 8:00 pm, ESPN 2	No. 3	No. 25 Baylor	W 81–75	17–1 (3–0)	28 – Collins	8 – Mc. Morris	5 – Taylor	Allen Fieldhouse (16,300); Lawrence, KS
01/23/10; 1:00 pm, ESPN	No. 3	at Iowa State	W 84–61	18–1 (4–0)	19 – Aldrich	11 – Aldrich	6 – Collins	Hilton Coliseum (14,356); Ames, IA
01/25/10; 8:00 pm, ESPN	No. 2	Missouri; Border War	W 84–65	19–1 (5–0)	17 – Mc. Morris	16 – Aldrich	5 – Morningstar	Allen Fieldhouse (16,300); Lawrence, KS
01/30/10; 6:00 pm, ESPN	No. 2	at No. 11 Kansas State; Sunflower Showdown	W 81–79 ^{OT}	20–1 (6–0)	18 – Aldrich	11 – Aldrich	4 – Collins	Bramlage Coliseum (12,528); Manhattan, KS
02/03/10; 8:00 pm, ESPN 2	No. 1	at Colorado	W 72–66 ^{OT}	21–1 (7–0)	16 – (2 Tied)	14 – Aldrich	6 – Morningstar	Coors Events Center (11,027); Boulder, CO
02/06/10; 5:00 pm, ESPN U	No. 1	Nebraska	W 75–64	22–1 (8–0)	20 – Mc. Morris	11 – Mc. Morris	6 – Collins	Allen Fieldhouse (16,300); Lawrence, KS
02/08/10; 8:00 pm, ESPN	No. 1	at No. 14 Texas	W 80–68	23–1 (9–0)	18 – Mc. Morris	9 – Mk. Morris	5 – Collins	Frank Erwin Center (16,734); Austin, TX
02/13/10; 7:00 pm, ESPN U	No. 1	Iowa State	W 73–59	24–1 (10–0)	16 – X. Henry	12 – Aldrich	5 – Collins	Allen Fieldhouse (16,300); Lawrence, KS
02/15/10; 8:00 pm, ESPN	No. 1	at No. 24 Texas A&M	W 59–54	25–1 (11–0)	12 – (3 Tied)	10 – Aldrich	5 – Morningstar	Reed Arena (13,657); College Station, TX
02/20/10; 3:00 pm, Big 12	No. 1	Colorado	W 94–74	26–1 (12–0)	24 – X. Henry	10 – Aldrich	7 – Collins	Allen Fieldhouse (16,300); Lawrence, KS
02/22/10; 8:00 pm, ESPN	No. 1	Oklahoma	W 81–68	27–1 (13–0)	23 – X. Henry	12 – Aldrich	6 – Collins	Allen Fieldhouse (16,300); Lawrence, KS
02/27/10; 3:00 pm, CBS	No. 1	at Oklahoma State	L 77–85	27–2 (13–1)	22 – Collins	5 – Aldrich	4 – Collins	Gallagher-Iba Arena (13,611); Stillwater, OK
03/03/10; 7:00 pm, Big 12	No. 2	No. 5 Kansas State; Sunflower Showdown	W 82–65	28–2 (14–1)	19 – X. Henry	9 – Mk. Morris	4 – (2 tied)	Allen Fieldhouse (16,300); Lawrence, KS
03/06/10; 1:00 pm, CBS	No. 2	at Missouri; Border War	W 77–56	29–2 (15–1)	13 – Taylor	10 – Mc. Morris	6 – Taylor	Mizzou Arena (15,061); Columbia, MO
Big 12 tournament
03/11/10; 11:30 am, ESPN2	No. 1	vs. Texas Tech; Quarterfinals	W 80–68	30–2	19 – Collins	18 – Aldrich	5 – Collins	Sprint Center (18,879); Kansas City, MO
03/12/10; 6:00 pm, Big 12	No. 1	vs. No. 23 Texas A&M; Semifinals	W 79–66	31–2	26 – Collins	9 – Aldrich	6 – Collins	Sprint Center (18,879); Kansas City, MO
03/13/10; 5:00 pm, ESPN	No. 1	vs. No. 9 Kansas State; Championship game	W 72–64	32–2	18 – Mc. Morris	8 – (2 Tied)	7 – Collins	Sprint Center (19,003); Kansas City, MO
NCAA tournament
3/18/10; 8:40 pm, CBS	No. 1 (1)	vs. (16) Lehigh; First Round	W 90–74	33–2	26 – Mc. Morris	10 – Mc. Morris	6 – Collins	Ford Center (13,484); Oklahoma City, Oklahoma
3/20/10*; 4:40 pm, CBS	No. 1 (1)	vs. (9) Northern Iowa; Second Round	L 67–69	33–3	16 – Mc. Morris	10 – Aldrich	4 – Collins	Ford Center (15,587); Oklahoma City, Oklahoma
*Non-conference game. ^{#}Rankings from AP Poll. (#) Tournament seedings in parentheses. All times are in Central Time.

== Rankings ==
Ranking movements Legend: ██ Increase in ranking ██ Decrease in ranking ( ) = First-place votes
	Week																			
Poll	Pre	1	2	3	4	5	6	7	8	9	10	11	12	13	14	15	16	17	18	Final
AP	1 (55)	1 (58)	1 (56)	1 (63)	1 (62)	1 (61)	1 (55)	1 (52)	1 (56)	3	3	2	1 (54)	1 (55)	1 (62)	1 (61)	2 (6)	1 (63)	1 (65)	Not released
Coaches	1 (27)	1 (27)	1 (28)	1 (30)	1 (31)	1 (30)	1 (31)	1 (28)	1 (30)	3	3	2	1 (26)	1 (29)	1 (30)	1 (30)	2 (7)	1 (30)	1 (31)	6

== See also ==
- 2010 NCAA Division I men's basketball tournament
- 2010 Big 12 men's basketball tournament
- 2009-10 NCAA Division I men's basketball season
- 2009-10 NCAA Division I men's basketball rankings
