= Cory Lidle =

American baseball player (1972–2006)

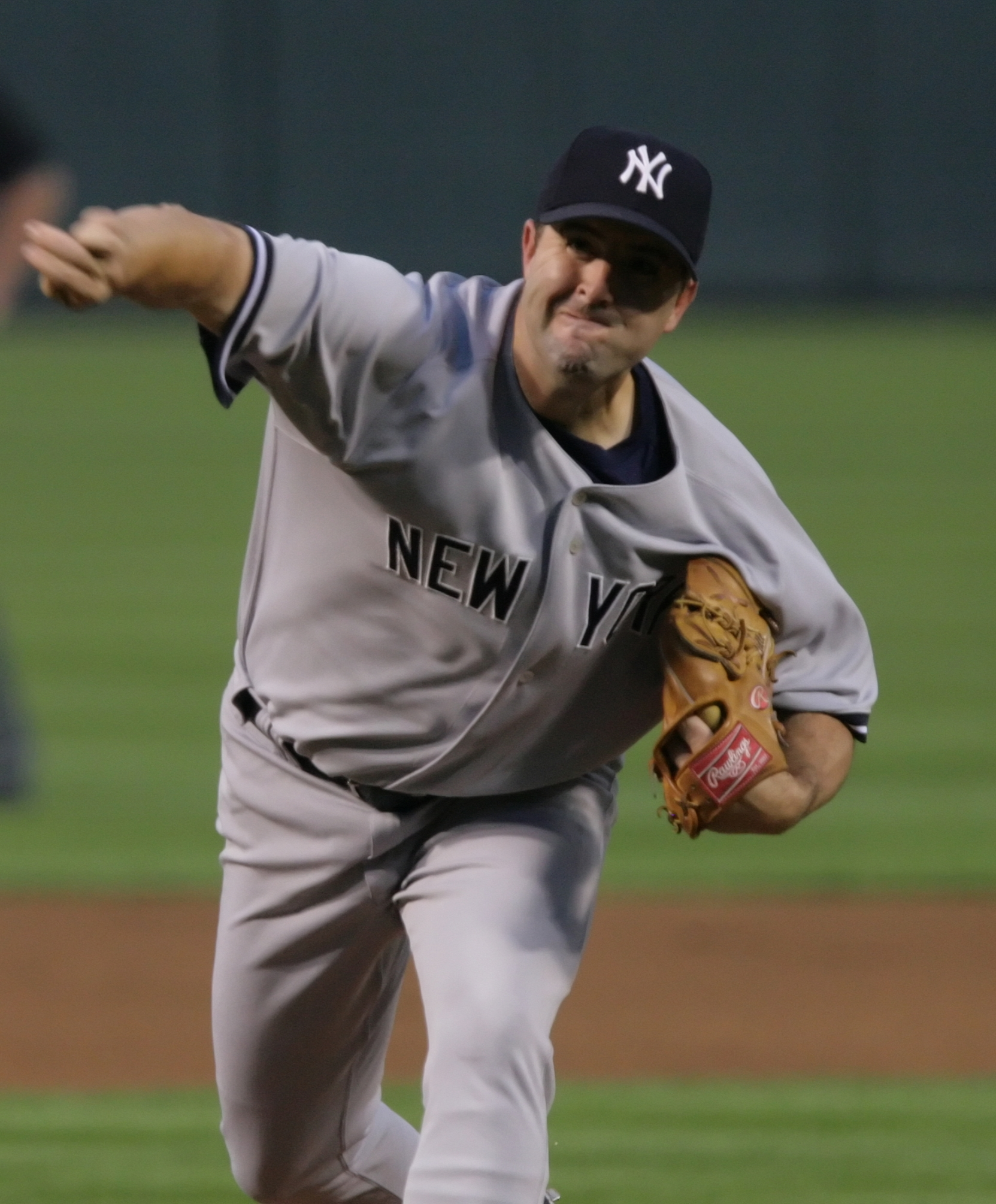
- Lidle with the New York Yankees in 2006
- Pitcher
- Born: March 22, 1972; Hollywood, California, U.S.
- Died: October 11, 2006 (aged 34); New York City, New York, U.S.
- Batted: Right Threw: Right

MLB debut
- May 8, 1997, for the New York Mets

Last MLB appearance
- October 1, 2006, for the New York Yankees

MLB statistics
- Win–loss record: 82–72
- Earned run average: 4.57
- Strikeouts: 838
- Stats at Baseball Reference

Teams
- New York Mets (1997); Tampa Bay Devil Rays (1999–2000); Oakland Athletics (2001–2002); Toronto Blue Jays (2003); Cincinnati Reds (2004); Philadelphia Phillies (2004–2006); New York Yankees (2006)

Cory Fulton Lidle (March 22, 1972 – October 11, 2006) was an American professional baseball player. A right-handed pitcher, Lidle played in Major League Baseball with the New York Mets, Tampa Bay Devil Rays, Oakland Athletics, Toronto Blue Jays, Cincinnati Reds, Philadelphia Phillies and the New York Yankees from 1997 to 2006. Lidle was killed when the small aircraft he owned crashed into a residential building in New York City.

== Baseball career ==
Lidle graduated from South Hills High School in West Covina, California, in 1990. He was a high school teammate of future major leaguers Jason Giambi and Aaron Small.

=== Minor leagues ===
Lidle was not drafted by any baseball teams, but he was signed by the Minnesota Twins as an amateur free agent. He was released in 1993 and spent a season playing for the unaffiliated Pocatello Posse in Idaho while bartending. After one season in Pocatello, he was signed by the Milwaukee Brewers. Due to his participation as a replacement player during the 1994 Major League Baseball strike, he was ineligible to join the Major League Baseball Players Association. In 1996, Lidle was traded to the New York Mets.

=== Major leagues ===
Lidle made his major league debut on May 8, 1997, with the Mets. He became a trusted relief pitcher that season, going 7–1 with a 3.19 earned run average out of the bullpen. Lidle had arm surgery in 1998. Lidle later played for the Tampa Bay Devil Rays, Oakland Athletics, Toronto Blue Jays, Cincinnati Reds, Philadelphia Phillies and New York Yankees. His best season was 2001, when he achieved a 13–6 record with a 3.59 ERA (10th in the American League) for Oakland, helping the Athletics win the wild card. In August 2002, he gave up only one run during the whole month (setting Oakland's record for consecutive innings without an earned run), won all five of his starts, and was one of the prime movers in the A's historic run of 20 straight wins. It was on this Oakland team where Lidle earned the nickname "Snacks", for his apparent love of "inhaling" junk food in the bullpen.

After the 2002 season, Lidle was traded to the Toronto Blue Jays, for whom he played one season. In 2003, Lidle led the major leagues with 123 earned runs allowed and had a 5.75 ERA that was the worst among qualified starters. Lidle then signed with the Cincinnati Reds, who later traded him to the Philadelphia Phillies.

Lidle played for the Phillies for parts of three seasons, amassing a record of 26–20. On July 30, 2006, Lidle was traded along with outfielder Bobby Abreu from the Philadelphia Phillies to the New York Yankees for minor league shortstop C. J. Henry, the Yankees' first round pick in the 2005 draft, along with left-handed reliever Matt Smith, minor league catcher Jesús Sánchez, and minor league right-hander Carlos Monasterios. After being traded, he criticized his former team, stating: "On the days I'm pitching, it's almost a coin flip as to know if the guys behind me are going to be there to play 100 percent." He noted his excitement to join a Yankees team that expected to win. In his first start for the Yankees, Lidle went six innings, giving up one run on four hits en route to an 8–1 Yankee victory as part of a sweep against the Toronto Blue Jays. On August 21, 2006, he went six three-hit shutout innings, completing an improbable five-game sweep (in four days) over the then second place Boston Red Sox (who went from 1 1/2 games behind to 6 1/2 games behind).

Lidle "became known for his outspoken nature, challenging the legitimacy of Barry Bonds' home run records" in a 2006 interview.

On October 7, in his final game (Game Four of the 2006 ALDS), Lidle lasted only an inning and a third, allowing three earned runs on four hits as the Yankees lost to the Detroit Tigers, 8–3. He was criticized for telling a reporter, "We got matched up with a team that, I think, was a little more ready to play than we were", which was taken by some as a jab at manager Joe Torre. For damage control, he called the radio talk show Mike and the Mad Dog and gave an extended defense of himself and the Yankees; the interview became contentious.

In his major league career, Lidle had an 82–72 record with a 4.57 earned run average.

== Personal life ==
Lidle married his wife Melanie (nee Varela) in 1997, and their son, Christopher Taylor Lidle, was born on September 18, 2000.

Lidle was a descendant of Robert Fulton, the inventor of the steamboat, as reflected in his middle name. Lidle's twin brother, Kevin, also played baseball, as a catcher and pitcher for various minor league teams between 1992 and 2002, and for an independent team in 2005.

== Death ==
On October 11, 2006, just four days after the Yankees' season ended with a loss to the Detroit Tigers in the 2006 ALDS, Lidle and co-pilot/flight instructor Tyler Stanger were flying a Cirrus SR20 airplane when it crashed into the Belaire Apartments complex at 524 East 72nd Street on New York City's Upper East Side, killing them both. The plane was flying above the East River past the Queensboro Bridge toward restricted airspace. The plane's operator (post-crash investigators could not determine which man was at the controls) was attempting a 180-degree turn to reverse course when the impact occurred. In addition to the deaths of Lidle and Stanger, 26 people were injured in the accident, about half of them New York City firefighters.

Lidle was the third Yankee to die in a plane crash. The prior two were catcher Thurman Munson (on August 2, 1979) and pitcher Jim Hardin (on March 9, 1991). Yankees owner George Steinbrenner described Lidle's death as a "terrible and shocking tragedy that has stunned the entire Yankees organization" and offered his condolences to Lidle's wife and six-year-old son. On October 12, 2006, before Game 1 of the 2006 NLCS in New York City between the New York Mets and the St. Louis Cardinals, both teams and all spectators observed a moment of silence in Lidle's memory.

The Yankees wore black armbands during the entire 2007 season in memory of Lidle. On April 2, 2007, Cory's widow Melanie and his son Christopher both threw the ceremonial first pitch on Opening Day at Yankee Stadium.

== See also ==
- List of people who died in aviation-related incidents
- List of Major League Baseball replacement players
- List of baseball players who died during their careers
