= Carl Henry (basketball) =

American basketball player

Personal information
- Born: August 16, 1960 (age 66) Hollis, Oklahoma, U.S.
- Listed height: 6 ft 6 in (1.98 m)
- Listed weight: 205 lb (93 kg)

Career information
- High school: U. S. Grant (Oklahoma City, Oklahoma)
- College: Oklahoma City (1979–1981); Kansas (1982–1984)
- NBA draft: 1984: 4th round, 80th overall pick
- Drafted by: Kansas City Kings
- Playing career: 1984–1993
- Position: Shooting guard
- Number: 11

Career history
- 1984–1985: Puerto Rico Coquis
- 1985–1986: Sacramento Kings
- Stats at NBA.com
- Stats at Basketball Reference

Carl J. Henry (born August 16, 1960) is an American former professional basketball player in the National Basketball Association (NBA). He was a 6'6", 205 lb shooting guard.

Born in Hollis, Oklahoma, Henry attended and played collegiately at both the University of Kansas and Oklahoma City University. Henry led Kansas in scoring in both 1982–83 and 1983–84, averaging 16.8 points per game as a junior, and 17.4 points per game in his senior season. He was selected with the tenth pick of the 4th round (80th overall) in the 1984 NBA draft by the Kansas City Kings. His NBA career lasted 28 games with the Sacramento Kings in 1985–86 (by then the franchise had relocated from Kansas City, Missouri). Henry last played basketball in 1993 for Bobcat Gent in Belgium. Henry then became an AAU basketball coach and a personal trainer for pro-basketball prospects.

Carl's son Xavier Henry was the 12th pick in the 2010 NBA draft. His other son, C. J. Henry, played for the University of Kansas's basketball team after transferring from Memphis and is a former minor league prospect for the New York Yankees. Carl's wife attended Kansas as a student-athlete for the women's basketball team.

== Career statistics ==
Legend
GP	Games played	GS	Games started	MPG	Minutes per game
FG%	Field goal percentage	3P%	3-point field goal percentage	FT%	Free throw percentage
RPG	Rebounds per game	APG	Assists per game	SPG	Steals per game
BPG	Blocks per game	PPG	Points per game	**Bold**	Career high

=== NBA ===
==== Regular season ====
Year	Team	GP	GS	MPG	FG%	3P%	FT%	RPG	APG	SPG	BPG	PPG
1985–86	Sacramento	28	0	5.3	.463	.400	.706	.7	.1	.2	.0	2.8

==== Playoffs ====
Year	Team	GP	GS	MPG	FG%	3P%	FT%	RPG	APG	SPG	BPG	PPG
1986	Sacramento	1	0	2.0	1.000	1.000	–	.0	.0	.0	.0	3.0
