= Xavier Henry =

American basketball player (born 1991)

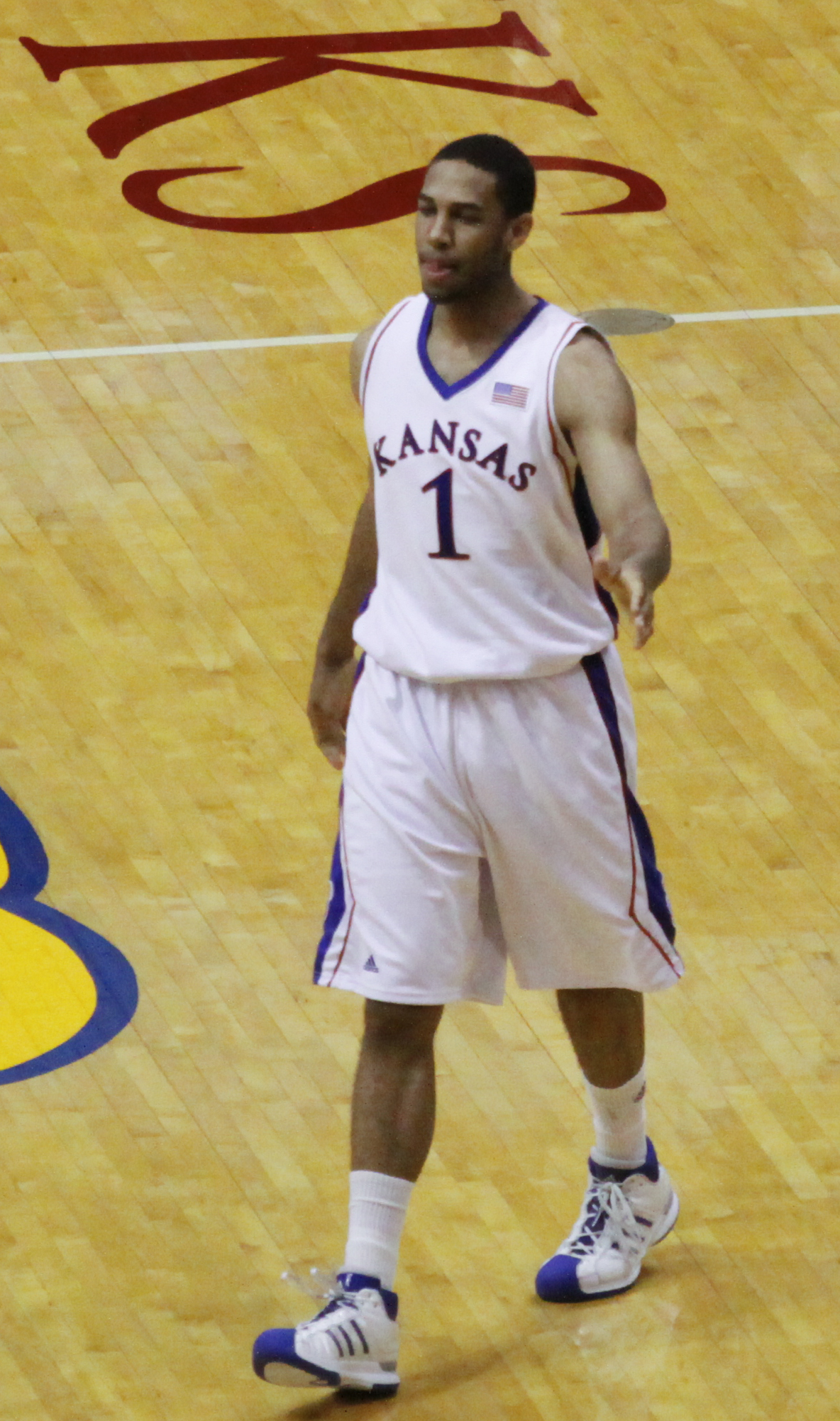
- Henry with the Kansas Jayhawks in 2009

Personal information
- Born: March 15, 1991 (age 35) Ghent, Belgium
- Listed height: 6 ft 6 in (1.98 m)
- Listed weight: 220 lb (100 kg)

Career information
- High school: Putnam City (Oklahoma City, Oklahoma)
- College: Kansas (2009–2010)
- NBA draft: 2010: 1st round, 12th overall pick
- Drafted by: Memphis Grizzlies
- Playing career: 2010–2017
- Position: Shooting guard / small forward
- Number: 13, 4, 7

Career history
- 2010–2012: Memphis Grizzlies
- 2012–2013: New Orleans Hornets
- 2012: →Iowa Energy
- 2013–2014: Los Angeles Lakers
- 2014: →Los Angeles D-Fenders
- 2015–2016: Santa Cruz Warriors
- 2016–2017: Oklahoma City Blue

Career highlights
- Big 12 All-Freshman team (2010); McDonald's All-American (2009); First-team Parade All-American (2009); Second-team Parade All-American (2008)
- Stats at NBA.com
- Stats at Basketball Reference

Xavier Henry (/zɑːˈviːeɪ/; born March 15, 1991) is an American former professional basketball player. He played one year of college basketball with the Kansas Jayhawks before he was drafted in the 2010 NBA draft by the Memphis Grizzlies. He played four and a half seasons in the NBA between 2010 and 2014. He finished his career in 2017 after two seasons in the NBA G League.

== Early life ==
Henry was born in Ghent, Belgium, where his father played professional basketball in the early 1990s.

== High school career ==
Henry attended Putnam City High School in Oklahoma City, Oklahoma. He missed the start of his of senior season after he fractured his cheekbone in a car accident in October 2008. On March 14, 2009, he led Putnam City to the Oklahoma Class 6A state championship, scoring 24 points in the title game against Jenks High School.

Henry was named to the 2009 McDonald's All-American Game where he scored 14 points. Henry was also selected to play in the 2009 Nike Hoop Summit at the Rose Garden in Portland where he led Team USA with 22 points including six 3-pointers and the Jordan Brand Classic at Madison Square Garden where he scored 10 points for the white team. He was SLAM magazine's high school diary keeper for the 2008–09 basketball season.

=== Recruitment ===
By the end of his senior season, Henry was ranked as the #6 overall prospect and #2 shooting guard in the class of 2009 by Scout.com, #8 overall and #3 shooting guard by Rivals.com and #3 overall, #2 shooting guard by ESPN. Originally, Henry was heavily recruited by both Memphis and Kansas. On November 18, 2008, Henry announced his commitment to Memphis citing the opportunity to play alongside his brother, C. J., as the primary reason for the decision.

In March 2009, Memphis's head coach John Calipari took the head coaching job at the University of Kentucky, prompting Henry to reopen his recruitment.

On April 23, Henry officially announced his choice to play basketball for Kansas.

I grew up always wanting to go to Kansas. I switched to Memphis because my brother was going there. Now, with coach (John Calipari) leaving (for Kentucky), we've decided to go to KU. I'm really excited. That's where my whole family played.

— Xavier Henry

College recruiting
Name	Hometown	School	Height	Weight	Commit date
Xavier Henry; SG	Oklahoma City	Putnam City	6 ft 6 in (1.98 m)	210 lb (95 kg)	Apr 23, 2009
Xavier Henry; SG	Recruit ratings: Scout: Rivals: (98)				

== College career ==
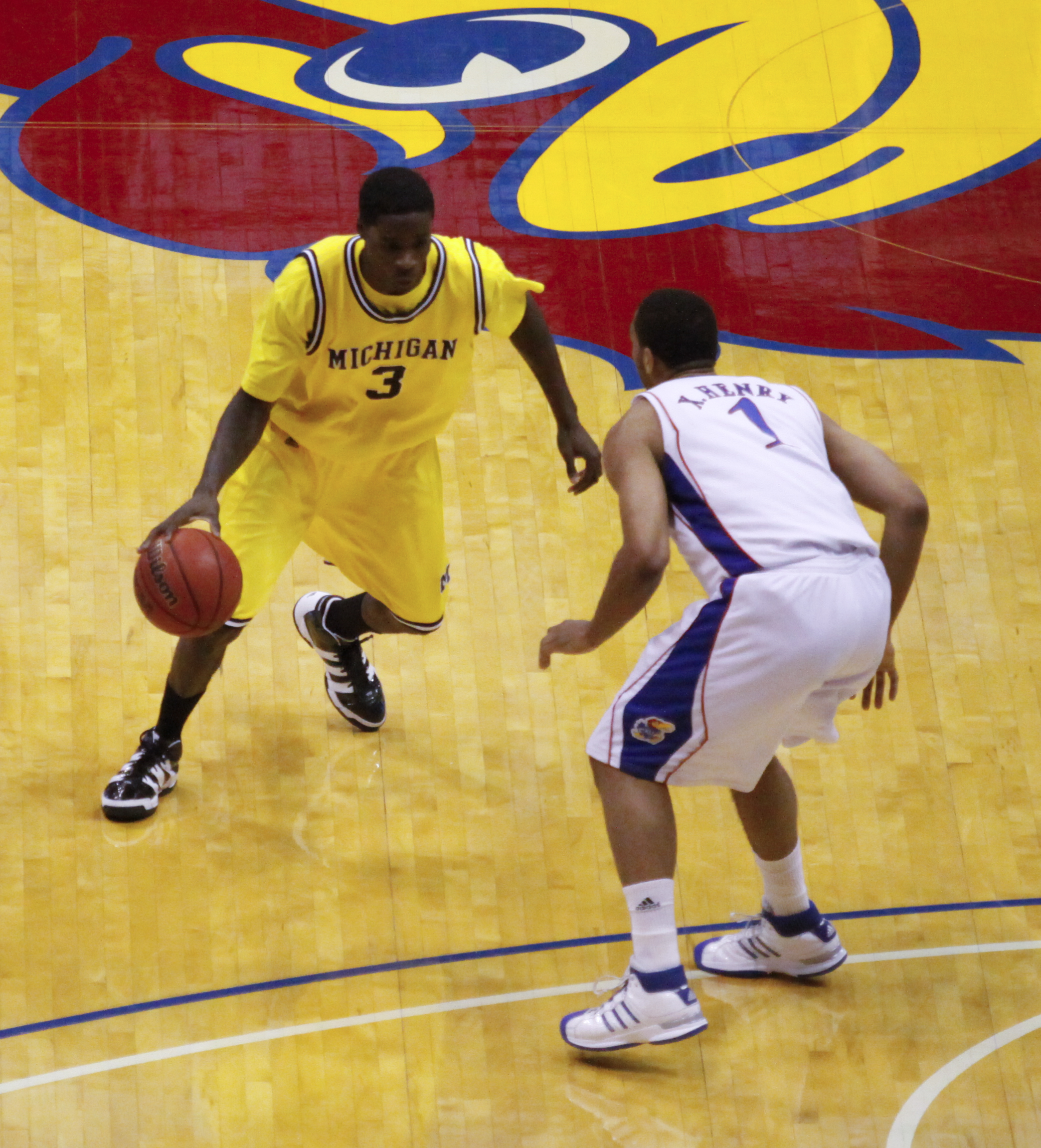
Henry guarding future Lakers and D-Fenders teammate Manny Harris of Michigan on December 19, 2009

Henry scored 27 points in his first college game, breaking the record for most points scored by a Jayhawk in a debut game as a freshman. On December 12, 2009, Henry scored 31 points against La Salle at the Sprint Center in Kansas City. In doing so he became the first KU freshman to score 30 points in a game since Paul Pierce. Henry's 31 points was four short of the KU record for points scored by a freshman set by KU legend Danny Manning.

=== College statistics ===
Year	Team	GP	GS	MPG	FG%	3P%	FT%	RPG	APG	SPG	BPG	PPG
2009–10	Kansas	36	36	27.5	.458	.418	.783	4.4	1.5	1.5	.5	13.4

== Professional career ==
=== Memphis Grizzlies (2010–2012) ===
On April 7, 2010, Henry announced that he would forgo his final three seasons of collegiate eligibility and enter the 2010 NBA draft, where he was expected to be a first-round selection. On June 24, Henry was selected 12th overall in the 2010 NBA draft by the Memphis Grizzlies.

=== New Orleans Hornets (2012–2013) ===
On January 4, 2012, Henry was acquired by New Orleans Hornets as a part of a three-team trade that sent Marreese Speights to Memphis and two future second-round picks to the Philadelphia 76ers. Henry was assigned to the Iowa Energy of the NBA Development League on March 17, 2012 and recalled on March 19.

=== Los Angeles Lakers (2013–2014) ===
On September 5, 2013, Henry signed with the Los Angeles Lakers. In his debut on October 29, 2013, he led the Lakers to a 116–103 victory over the Los Angeles Clippers while scoring a career-high 22 points. On February 27, 2014, he was assigned to the Los Angeles D-Fenders of the NBA Development League. On March 2, 2014, he was recalled by the Lakers. On April 11, 2014, Henry underwent surgery to repair both a torn ligament in his left wrist and a cartilage abnormality in his right knee.

On July 25, 2014, Henry re-signed with the Lakers to a reported one-year, $1 million contract.

On October 18, 2014, Henry's agents announced that he would be seeking a second opinion following his April 11 knee surgery and traveling to Germany for Regenokine treatment. On November 15, 2014, he was reassigned to the Los Angeles D-Fenders. He was recalled the next day. On November 22, he was reassigned to D-Fenders and again recalled a day later. On November 24, he was ruled out for the rest of the season after an MRI revealed a ruptured left Achilles tendon that he suffered at practice. On December 28, 2014, he was waived by the Lakers.

=== Santa Cruz Warriors (2015–2016) ===
On October 19, 2015, Henry signed with the Golden State Warriors. He was waived just four days later. On November 2, he was acquired by the Santa Cruz Warriors of the NBA Development League as an affiliate player of Golden State. On February 19, 2016, he made his debut for Santa Cruz in a 116–100 loss to the Rio Grande Valley Vipers, recording 14 points, four rebounds, one assist and two blocks in 16 minutes.

=== Oklahoma City Blue (2016–2017) ===
On September 12, 2016, Henry signed with the Milwaukee Bucks, but was later waived by the team on September 23 prior to training camp. On November 3, he was acquired by the Oklahoma City Blue of the NBA Development League (now renamed the NBA G League).

== Career statistics ==
Legend
GP	Games played	GS	Games started	MPG	Minutes per game
FG%	Field goal percentage	3P%	3-point field goal percentage	FT%	Free throw percentage
RPG	Rebounds per game	APG	Assists per game	SPG	Steals per game
BPG	Blocks per game	PPG	Points per game	**Bold**	Career high

=== NBA ===
==== Regular season ====
Year	Team	GP	GS	MPG	FG%	3P%	FT%	RPG	APG	SPG	BPG	PPG
2010–11	Memphis	38	**16**	13.9	.406	.118	.635	1.0	.5	.3	.1	4.3
2011–12	New Orleans	45	0	16.9	.395	**.412**	.612	2.4	.8	.6	**.2**	5.3
2012–13	New Orleans	**50**	2	12.5	.410	.364	.630	1.8	.3	.3	.1	3.9
2013–14	L.A. Lakers	43	5	**21.1**	**.417**	.346	**.655**	**2.7**	**1.2**	**1.0**	**.2**	**10.0**
2014–15	L.A. Lakers	9	0	9.6	.231	.000	.583	.4	.3	.3	.0	2.2
Career		185	23	15.7	.406	.325	.635	1.9	.6	.5	.1	5.7

== Personal life ==
Henry is a Christian. Henry has spoken about his faith saying, "I understand the world is not all about me. I want to lead people to Christ, do the best I can and make life worthwhile. Life is about other things. It's helping people out and being a servant to everybody else."

Henry's brother, C. J., was a 2005 MLB first-round draft pick and returned to college after playing three years of minor-league baseball in the New York Yankees and Philadelphia Phillies organizations. The brothers' father, Carl, played basketball at Kansas in the 1980s and their mother played basketball for the Kansas women's team.
