= 2005 Major League Baseball All-Star Game =

2005 American baseball competition

	1	2	3	4	5	6	7	8	9	R	H	E
National League	0	0	0	0	0	0	2	1	2	5	11	0
American League	0	1	2	2	0	2	0	0	x	7	11	1
- Date: July 12, 2005
- Venue: Comerica Park
- City: Detroit, Michigan
- Managers: Tony La Russa (STL); Terry Francona (BOS)
- MVP: Miguel Tejada (BAL)
- Attendance: 41,617
- Ceremonial first pitch: Al Kaline and Willie Horton
- Television: Fox (United States); MLB International (International)
- TV announcers: Joe Buck and Tim McCarver (Fox); Dave O'Brien and Rick Sutcliffe (MLB International)
- Radio: ESPN
- Radio announcers: Dan Shulman and Dave Campbell

The 2005 Major League Baseball All-Star Game was the 76th playing of the midseason exhibition baseball game between the all-stars of the American League (AL) and National League (NL), the two leagues comprising Major League Baseball. The game was awarded in August 2003, and was held at Comerica Park on July 12, 2005 in Detroit, Michigan, the home of the Detroit Tigers of the American League. The game resulted in the American League defeating the National League 7–5, thus awarding an AL team (which eventually came to be the Chicago White Sox) home-field advantage in the 2005 World Series. In this game Rawlings first previewed the Coolflo batting helmets, which became standard the following season.

== History ==
This was the fourth time the Tigers hosted the MLB All-Star game, having previously hosted the 1941, 1951 and 1971 games at Tiger Stadium, each game a victory for the American League.

== Rosters ==
Players in italics have since been inducted into the National Baseball Hall of Fame.

=== National League ===
Elected starters
Position	Player	Team	All-Star Games
C	Mike Piazza	Mets	12
1B	Derrek Lee	Cubs	1
2B	Jeff Kent	Dodgers	5
3B	Aramis Ramírez	Cubs	1
SS	David Eckstein	Cardinals	1
OF	Bobby Abreu	Phillies	2
OF	Carlos Beltrán	Mets	2
OF	Jim Edmonds	Cardinals	4
DH	Albert Pujols	Cardinals	4

Pitchers
Position	Player	Team	All-Star Games
P	Chris Carpenter	Cardinals	1
P	Roger Clemens	Astros	11
P	Chad Cordero	Nationals	1
P	Brian Fuentes	Rockies	1
P	Liván Hernández	Nationals	2
P	Jason Isringhausen	Cardinals	2
P	Brad Lidge	Astros	1
P	Pedro Martínez^{[a]}	Mets	7
P	Roy Oswalt^{[FV]}	Astros	1
P	Jake Peavy	Padres	1
P	John Smoltz	Braves	7
P	Billy Wagner^{[b]}	Phillies	4
P	Dontrelle Willis	Marlins	2

Reserves
Position	Player	Team	All-Star Games
C	Paul Lo Duca	Marlins	3
2B	Luis Castillo	Marlins	3
3B	Morgan Ensberg^{[b]}	Astros	1
3B	Scott Rolen^{[a]}	Cardinals	4
SS	César Izturis^{[a]}	Dodgers	1
SS	Felipe López	Reds	1
SS	Jimmy Rollins^{[b]}	Phillies	3
OF	Moisés Alou	Giants	6
OF	Jason Bay	Pirates	1
OF	Miguel Cabrera	Marlins	2
OF	Luis Gonzalez	Diamondbacks	5
OF	Andruw Jones	Braves	4
OF	Carlos Lee	Brewers	1

=== American League ===
Elected starters
Position	Player	Team	All-Star Games
C	Jason Varitek	Red Sox	2
1B	Mark Teixeira	Rangers	1
2B	Brian Roberts	Orioles	1
3B	Alex Rodriguez	Yankees	9
SS	Miguel Tejada	Orioles	3
OF	Johnny Damon	Red Sox	2
OF	Vladimir Guerrero	Angels	6
OF	Manny Ramírez	Red Sox	9
DH	David Ortiz	Red Sox	2

Pitchers
Position	Player	Team	All-Star Games
P	Danys Báez	Devil Rays	1
P	Mark Buehrle	White Sox	2
P	Matt Clement^{[b]}	Red Sox	1
P	Bartolo Colón	Angels	2
P	Justin Duchscherer	Athletics	1
P	Jon Garland	White Sox	1
P	Roy Halladay^{[a]}	Blue Jays	3
P	Joe Nathan	Twins	2
P	Mariano Rivera	Yankees	7
P	Kenny Rogers	Rangers	3
P	B.J. Ryan	Orioles	1
P	Johan Santana	Twins	1
P	Bob Wickman	Indians	2

Reserves
Position	Player	Team	All-Star Games
C	Iván Rodríguez	Tigers	12
1B	Shea Hillenbrand	Blue Jays	2
1B	Paul Konerko	White Sox	2
2B	Alfonso Soriano	Rangers	4
3B	Melvin Mora	Orioles	2
SS	Michael Young	Rangers	2
DH	Mike Sweeney	Royals	5
OF	Garret Anderson	Angels	3
OF	Scott Podsednik^{[FV]}	White Sox	1
OF	Gary Sheffield	Yankees	9
OF	Ichiro Suzuki	Mariners	5

Notes

- ^{a} Player declined or was unable to play.
- ^{b} Player replaced vacant spot on roster.
- ^{FV} Player was voted onto roster via the All-Star Final Vote.

== Managers ==
National League: Tony LaRussa
American League: Terry Francona

== Game ==
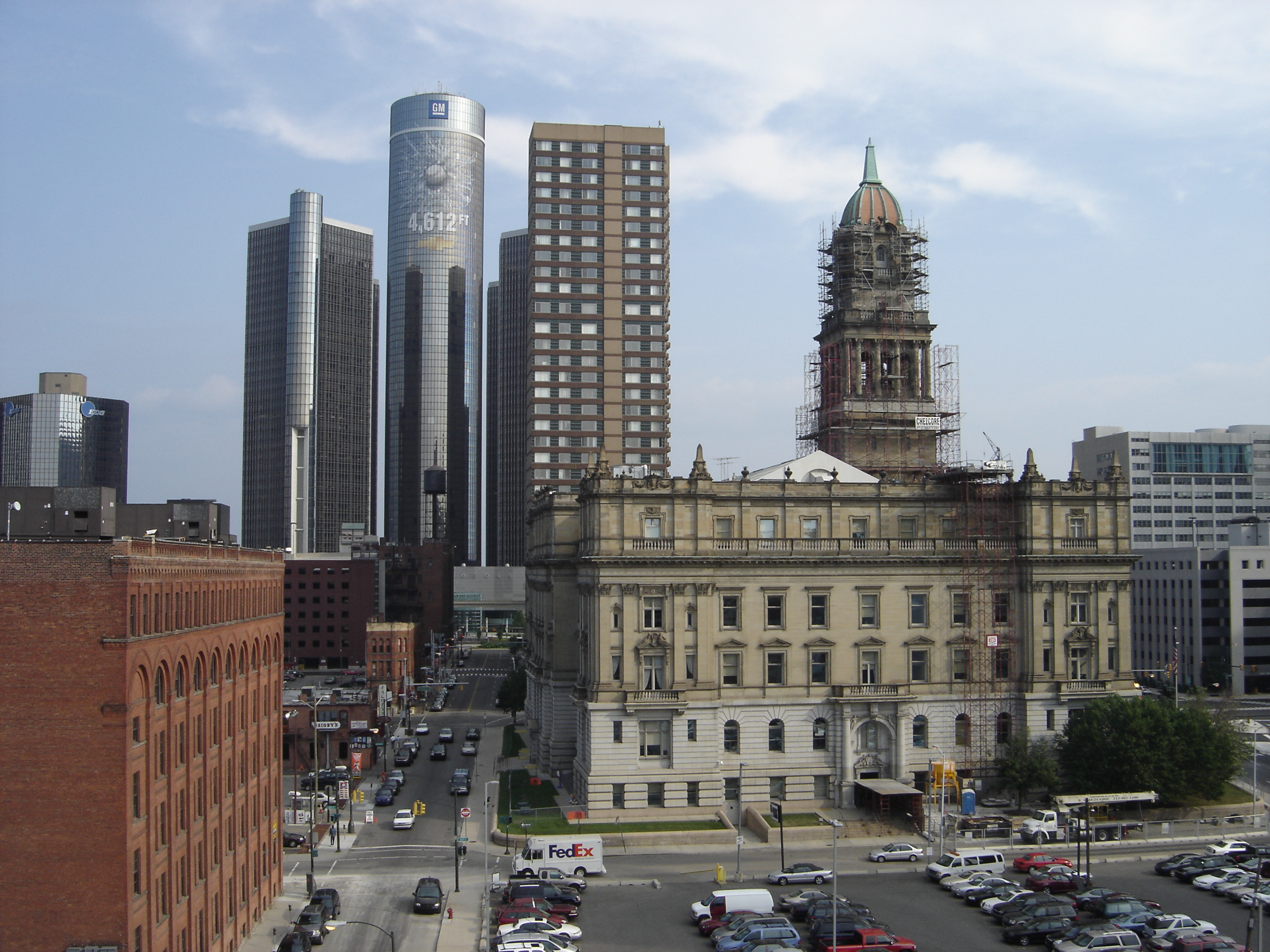
Renaissance Center with giant decal for the 2005 Major League Baseball All-Star Game.

=== Umpires ===
Home Plate	Joe West
First Base	Tim Welke
Second Base	Eric Cooper
Third Base	Mike DiMuro
Left Field	C. B. Bucknor
Right Field	Andy Fletcher

=== Starting lineups ===
National League				American League			
Order	Player	Team	Position	Order	Player	Team	Position
1	Bobby Abreu	Phillies	RF	1	Johnny Damon	Red Sox	CF
2	Carlos Beltrán	Mets	LF	2	Alex Rodriguez	Yankees	3B
3	Albert Pujols	Cardinals	DH	3	David Ortiz	Red Sox	DH
4	Derrek Lee	Cubs	1B	4	Manny Ramírez	Red Sox	LF
5	Jim Edmonds	Cardinals	CF	5	Miguel Tejada	Orioles	SS
6	Aramis Ramírez	Cubs	3B	6	Vladimir Guerrero	Angels	RF
7	Mike Piazza	Mets	C	7	Mark Teixeira	Rangers	1B
8	Jeff Kent	Dodgers	2B	8	Jason Varitek	Red Sox	C
9	David Eckstein	Cardinals	SS	9	Brian Roberts	Orioles	2B
	Chris Carpenter	Cardinals	P		Mark Buehrle	White Sox	P

=== Game summary ===
Tuesday, July 12, 2005 8:35 pm (EDT) at Comerica Park in Detroit, Michigan
Team	1	2	3	4	5	6	7	8	9	R	H	E
National League	0	0	0	0	0	0	2	1	2	5	11	0
American League	0	1	2	2	0	2	0	0	-	7	11	1
WP: Mark Buehrle (1–0) LP: John Smoltz (0–1) Sv: Mariano Rivera (1); Home runs: NL: Andruw Jones (1); AL: Miguel Tejada (1), Mark Teixeira (1)

A superchoir consisting of three choirs from Windsor, Ontario, sang "O Canada", the Canadian National Anthem. Then, a moment of silence for the victims of the July 7 London bombings, which took place a few days before the game, followed by the Detroit Symphony Orchestra Brass Players' performance of "God Save the Queen", the national anthem of the United Kingdom. Brian McKnight sang The Star-Spangled Banner, the U.S. National Anthem. The colors presentation was by the Camp Grayling color guard, accompanied by University of Toledo ROTC officers who presented the flags in the outfield.

In the first inning, starters Mark Buehrle and Chris Carpenter each induced a double play, from Carlos Beltrán and Manny Ramírez respectively, to end early threats. The American League would score in the bottom of the second, when the game's MVP, Miguel Tejada, crushed a shot off John Smoltz to give the AL a 1–0 lead. The AL would score two more in the third, on the strength of a David Ortiz RBI single, and an RBI groundout by Tejada, his second RBI in as many innings.

The NL wasted a scoring opportunity in the top of the fourth, when with two runners on, Aramis Ramírez grounded into a double play to end that threat. In the bottom of that inning, Ichiro Suzuki hit a broken-bat, bloop single to score two, but was then picked off first base by Liván Hernández. Then, in the bottom of the sixth, Mark Teixeira, a switch-hitter, hit an opposite field, two-run homer off Dontrelle Willis, his first home run off a left-hander that season, opening the AL's lead to 7–0.

During the seventh-inning stretch, The Winans sang God Bless America.

The NL finally got on the board in the next inning, when Andruw Jones launched a two-run shot just inside the foul pole off Kenny Rogers to close the NL to within five. They scored another run in the eighth, when Moisés Alou scored on an RBI forceout by Miguel Cabrera.

In the top of the ninth, Luis Gonzalez scored Andruw Jones with a double off of Baltimore closer B.J. Ryan, and then scored himself on an RBI groundout by Carlos Lee. Mariano Rivera then came on to stop the NL's potential rally. Rivera struck out Morgan Ensberg to end the threat, and the game, securing a 7–5 win for the AL.

Hall-of-Famer and former Tigers outfielder Al Kaline joined the ceremonial first pitch ceremonies.

Prior to the game, Taco Bell sponsored a Pitch for a Million Dollars contest. The contestant Frank Nelson was chosen randomly from people who had attended and submitted their name at the local All-Star Game events held in Detroit in the weeks prior. The contestant Frank Nelson would have to pitch 5 balls through a hole in 30 seconds from the mound to the home plate. Taco Bell informed him the Tuesday prior to the Game and made him sign an agreement to not practice the day of and could only receive verbal coaching from his coach Mark "The Bird" Fidrych. The size of the hole was also reduced due to someone winning it previously. He was only able to pitch one through the hole within the 30 seconds, so he received the Runner up prize of $5.00 each week towards Taco Bell for a year.

== Home Run Derby ==
In this event, the eight competitors each came from a different nation. This format dovetailed with the announcement of the launch of the World Baseball Classic the week before, as of the following year.

Comerica Park, Detroit—N.L. 66, A.L. 42
Player	Team	Round 1	Semis	Finals	Totals
(Venezuela) Bobby Abreu	Philadelphia	24	6	11	41
(Puerto Rico) Iván Rodríguez	Detroit	7	8	5	20
(Panama) Carlos Lee	Milwaukee	11	4	–	15
(Dominican Republic) David Ortiz	Boston	17	3	–	20
(South Korea) Hee-Seop Choi	Los Angeles	5	–	–	5
(Curaçao) Andruw Jones	Atlanta	5	–	–	5
(United States) Mark Teixeira	Texas	2	–	–	2
(Canada) Jason Bay	Pittsburgh	0	–	–	0
