= Miguel Tejada =

Dominican baseball player (born 1974)

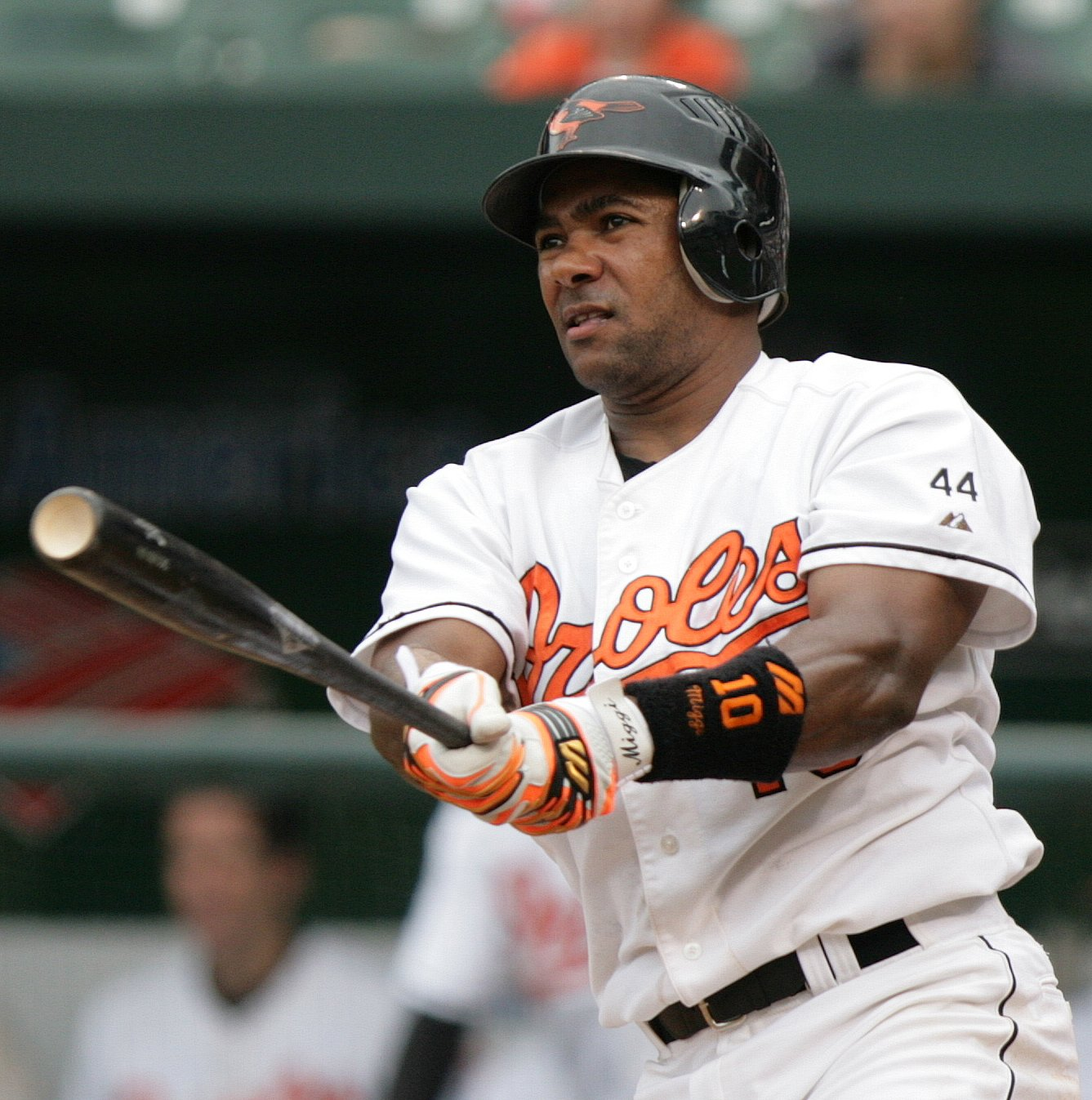
- Tejada with the Orioles in 2006

Bravos de León
- Shortstop / Manager
- Born: May 25, 1974 (age 52); Baní, Dominican Republic
- Batted: Right Threw: Right

MLB debut
- August 27, 1997, for the Oakland Athletics

Last MLB appearance
- August 10, 2013, for the Kansas City Royals

MLB statistics
- Batting average: .285
- Hits: 2,407
- Home runs: 307
- Runs batted in: 1,302
- Stats at Baseball Reference

Teams
- Oakland Athletics (1997–2003); Baltimore Orioles (2004–2007); Houston Astros (2008–2009); Baltimore Orioles (2010); San Diego Padres (2010); San Francisco Giants (2011); Kansas City Royals (2013)

Career highlights and awards
- 6× All-Star (2002, 2004–2006, 2008, 2009); AL MVP (2002); 2× Silver Slugger Award (2004, 2005); MLB RBI leader (2004); Athletics Hall of Fame
Medals
Men's baseball
Representing Dominican Republic
World Baseball Classic
| Gold medal – first place | 2013 San Francisco | Team |

Miguel Odalis Tejada Martínez (né Tejeda Martínez; born May 25, 1974) is a Dominican former professional baseball shortstop who played 16 seasons in Major League Baseball (MLB). He played for six teams, most notably the Oakland Athletics and Baltimore Orioles, before short stints with the Houston Astros, San Diego Padres, San Francisco Giants, and Kansas City Royals. He is currently the manager of the Bravos de León of the Mexican League.

Tejada spent his first six seasons in MLB with the Athletics, where he began a streak of 1,152 consecutive games that ended with the Orioles on June 22, 2007. He is a six-time All-Star and a two-time Silver Slugger Award winner. In 2002, he won the American League Most Valuable Player (MVP) Award, and was the 2005 All-Star Game MVP. Tejada's nickname is "La Guagua", which means "the bus" in certain Spanish dialects, after his ability to drive in runs. He was the last Oakland Athletics player to win the American League MVP award before the team’s relocation in 2025.

On February 11, 2009, he pleaded guilty to one count of perjury for lying to Congress in his testimony on whether Rafael Palmeiro lied about his steroid use. On August 17, 2013, MLB suspended Tejada for 105 games for violating MLB drug policy. It was the third-longest non-lifetime suspension ever issued by MLB for a drug-related violation.

== Early life ==
Tejada grew up in extreme poverty in Baní, a city about 40 miles (65 km) southwest of Santo Domingo, capital of the Dominican Republic. He grew up idolizing the Baltimore Orioles shortstop Cal Ripken Jr.

== Professional career ==
=== Oakland Athletics (1997–2003) ===
==== 1997–2001 ====
Tejada developed quickly into a top-notch prospect, showing early signs of power. He reached the Majors towards the end of the 1997 season, joining a struggling Oakland Athletics club. Though he only hit .202 in 26 games that year, the A's saw potential in the 23-year-old Tejada. This was bolstered by his performance with the Edmonton Trappers (AAA) in the Pacific Coast League during the season, and returning to the minors to lead the Trappers to a PCL championship that year. He was rewarded with the starting shortstop job beginning in 1998.

The A's, and Tejada, steadily improved over the next two years. His hitting improved as he gained more discipline at the plate. In 1998, he hit .233 with 11 home runs and in 1999 his average jumped to .251 with 21 home runs.

After a solid 87-win campaign in 1999, Tejada and a core of young players led their A's to their first American League Western Division title in eight years in 2000. Bolstered by an American League MVP-winning performance by first baseman Jason Giambi, and aided by Tejada's .275 average and 30 home runs, the A's won 91 games. The A's faced the New York Yankees in the first round of the postseason, which was won by the Yankees 3–2.

In 2001, Tejada had a comparable offensive year, hitting .267 with 31 homers. The A's captured the American League wild card with a 102–60 record. In the postseason, however, the A's fell to the Yankees in five games, blowing an initial 2–0 series lead.

==== 2002 ====
Tejada's breakout year came in 2002. With the departure of Jason Giambi to the New York Yankees during the offseason, and a leg injury to slugger Jermaine Dye, the A's lost two of their key offensive players. Tejada hit .308 with 34 homers and led the A's to their second Western Division title in three years. Their campaign included an American League record 20 game winning-streak. Tejada contributed one-out, game-winning hits in the 18th and 19th games of that run: a three-run homer off Minnesota Twins closer Eddie Guardado for a 7–5 victory and a bases-loaded single against Kansas City Royals reliever Jason Grimsley to break a 6–6 tie. His regular season performance was rewarded with the 2002 American League MVP award. For the third straight year, though, the A's fell in the fifth game of the ALDS, this time to the Minnesota Twins.

==== 2003 ====
The next year, both the A's and Tejada got off to a slow start, with the shortstop hitting under .200 for the first month of the season. Improved play in the second half of the season led the A's to their second straight Western Division title and their third in four years. Tejada hit .278 with 27 homers for the year, a decrease from his numbers in 2002, but still leading many offensive categories for shortstops.

In a tension-filled series, the powerful offense of the Boston Red Sox narrowly edged out the A's in the first round, once again in five games. Tejada was known for his public display of anger toward Boston starting pitcher Derek Lowe at the series' conclusion for what he perceived as obscene gestures. Lowe denied the accusation, claiming his fist pump was in celebration only.

=== Baltimore Orioles (2004–2007) ===
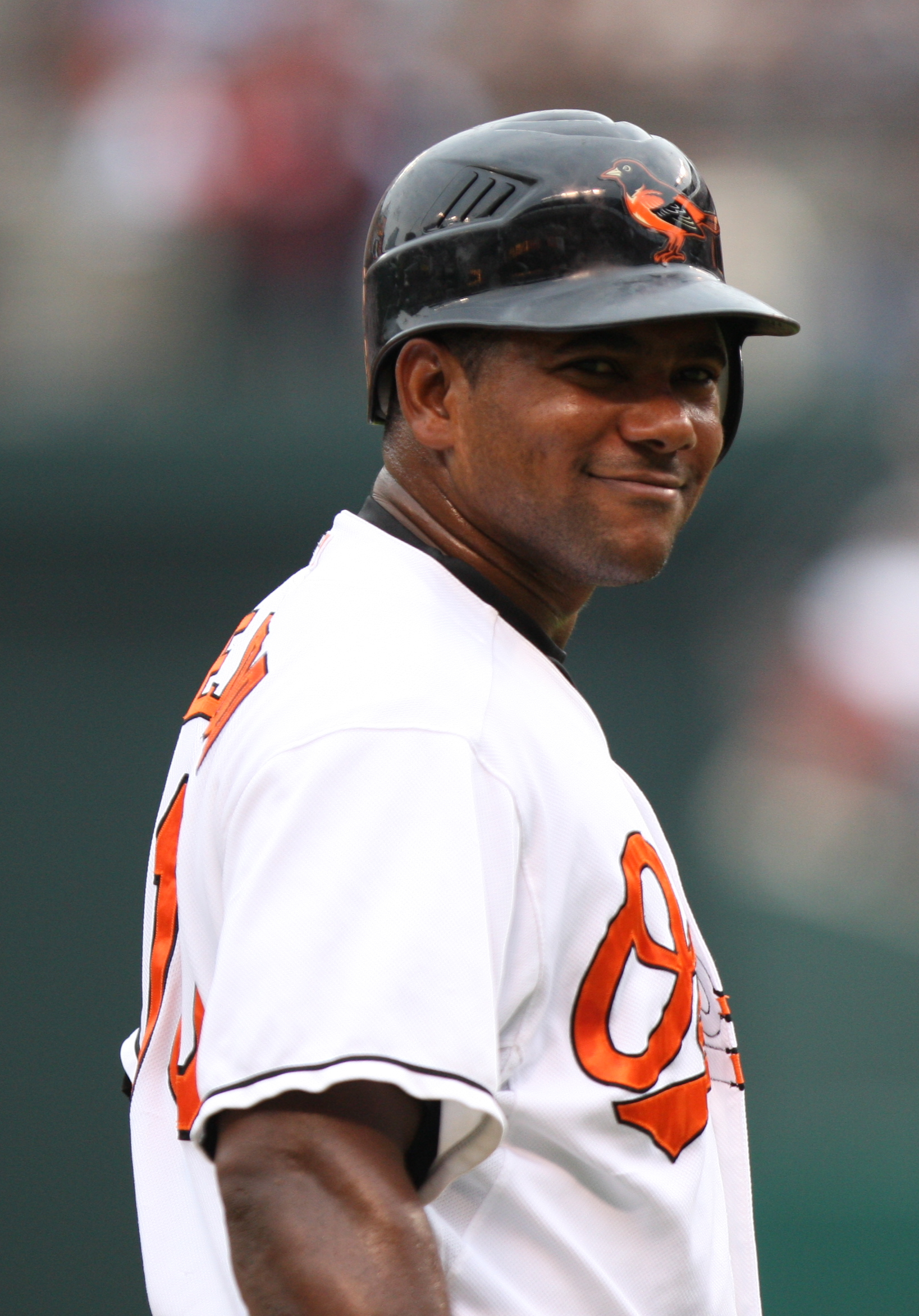
Tejada during his first tenure with the Baltimore Orioles in 2007

By the end of the 2003 season, Tejada had established himself as one of baseball's premier shortstops. The A's elected not to re-sign the free agent, citing budget concerns and a young Bobby Crosby coming through the system, so Tejada signed a six-year, $72 million deal with the Baltimore Orioles during the offseason.

On arrival in Baltimore, Tejada was given uniform number 10, since 4, his number in Oakland, had been retired for former manager Earl Weaver. As an Oriole, Tejada followed in the footsteps of legendary Baltimore shortstop Cal Ripken Jr. Like Ripken, Tejada was a strong and durable shortstop with unusual power numbers for a middle infielder.

==== 2004–2005 ====
On July 12, 2004, Tejada won the Century 21 Home Run Derby in Houston. Tejada hit a (then) record 27 home runs in the contest, including a record 15 homers in the second round. He defeated Houston Astros outfielder Lance Berkman (who would later become his teammate) 5–4 in the final round of the contest. Both records were broken the following year in Detroit by Bobby Abreu. Tejada finished the 2004 season with 34 home runs and an MLB-leading 150 RBIs, and won his first career Silver Slugger Award.

While Tejada did not participate in the Home Run Derby in 2005, he was an All-Star and starter for the AL. In his first All-Star start, Tejada hit a solo home run against John Smoltz of the Atlanta Braves, had a sacrifice RBI and was part of an all-Oriole double play with teammate Brian Roberts. His efforts earned him the All-Star MVP, winning a Chevrolet Corvette.

==== 2005–2006 offseason ====
In the winter of 2005, Tejada asked the Orioles for a trade, citing unhappiness with the team's direction, while commenting briefly on his alleged non-involvement in Palmeiro's steroid scandal. Weeks would go by before Tejada relented on the idea of being traded away, although the Orioles would later try to offload him during the 2006 All-Star break (with the Los Angeles Angels being one of the teams that failed to meet the asking price).

==== 2006–2007 ====
Tejada played in his 1,000th consecutive game on July 1, 2006.

Tejada's streak was at 1,151 games when he was hit on his left wrist by a pitch from Doug Brocail on June 20, 2007. The next day, he went up to bunt in the top of the first inning, bunted into a force play, and was replaced by a pinch runner. Following that game, it was announced that he had a broken wrist. On June 22 he was placed on the disabled list, ending his streak at 1,152 consecutive games, the fifth longest in Major League history, behind Cal Ripken Jr. (2,632), Lou Gehrig (2,130), Everett Scott (1,307), and Steve Garvey (1,217).

=== Houston Astros (2008–2009) ===
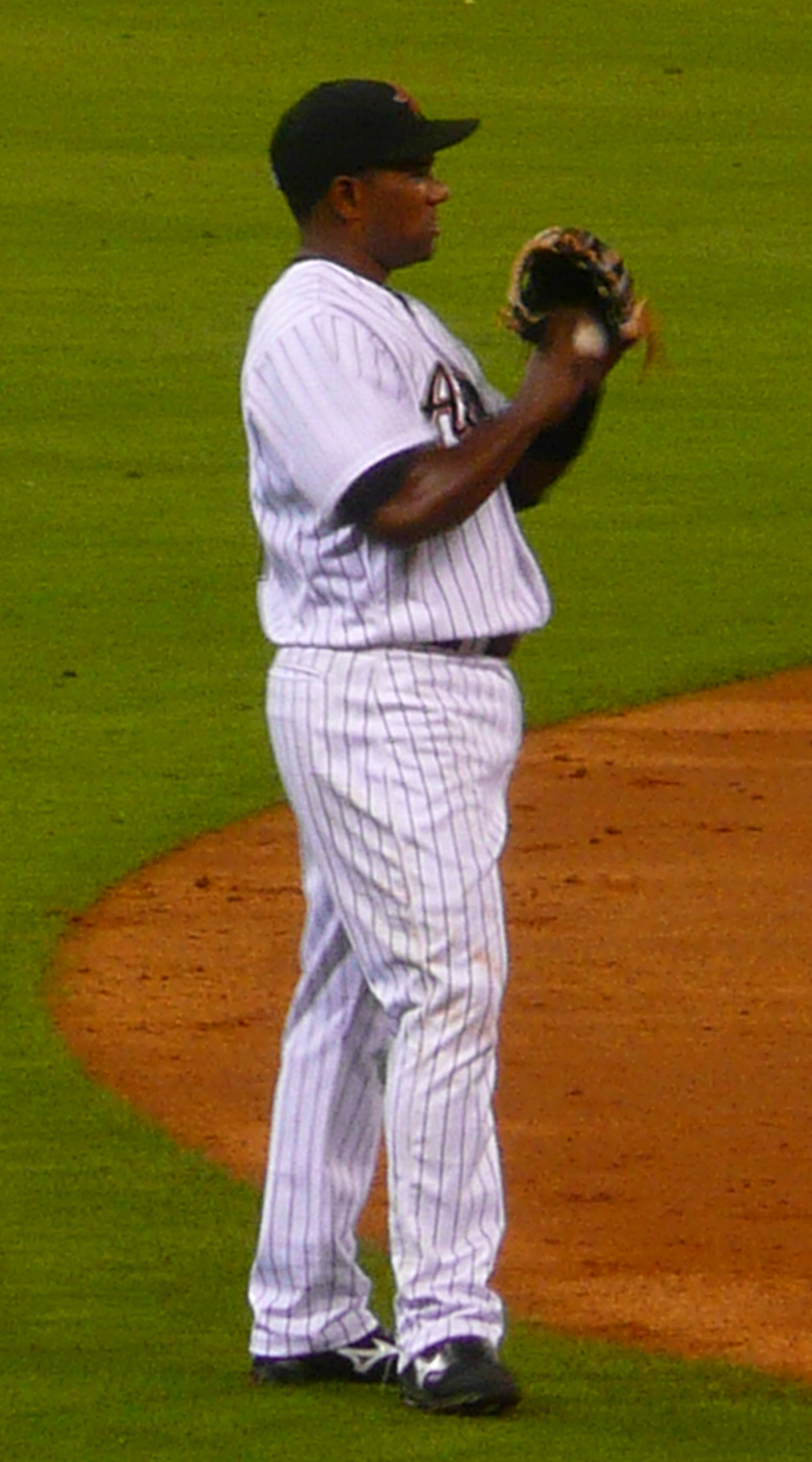
Tejada playing for the Houston Astros in 2008

On December 12, 2007, Tejada was dealt to the Houston Astros for five players, including SP Troy Patton, OF Luke Scott, RP Dennis Sarfate and RP/SP Matt Albers.

Tejada scored his 1,000th career run on July 7, 2008, at PNC Park. In the 2008 All-Star Game Tejada singled leading off the top of the eighth stole second with one out and advanced to third on a throwing error and scored on Padres' first baseman Adrián González's sacrifice fly.

In the 2008 season he grounded into 32 double plays, the most in the major leagues. In 2009, he again led the majors in grounding into double plays, this time with 29. He became the first player in major league history to lead the league in double plays grounded into five times.

=== Second stint with the Orioles (2010) ===
On January 23, 2010, Tejada agreed to a one-year deal worth $6 million with the Orioles.

=== San Diego Padres (2010) ===
On July 29, the Orioles traded Tejada to the San Diego Padres for minor league pitcher Wynn Pelzer. On September 22, Tejada hit his 300th career home run off Ted Lilly of the Los Angeles Dodgers.

=== San Francisco Giants (2011) ===
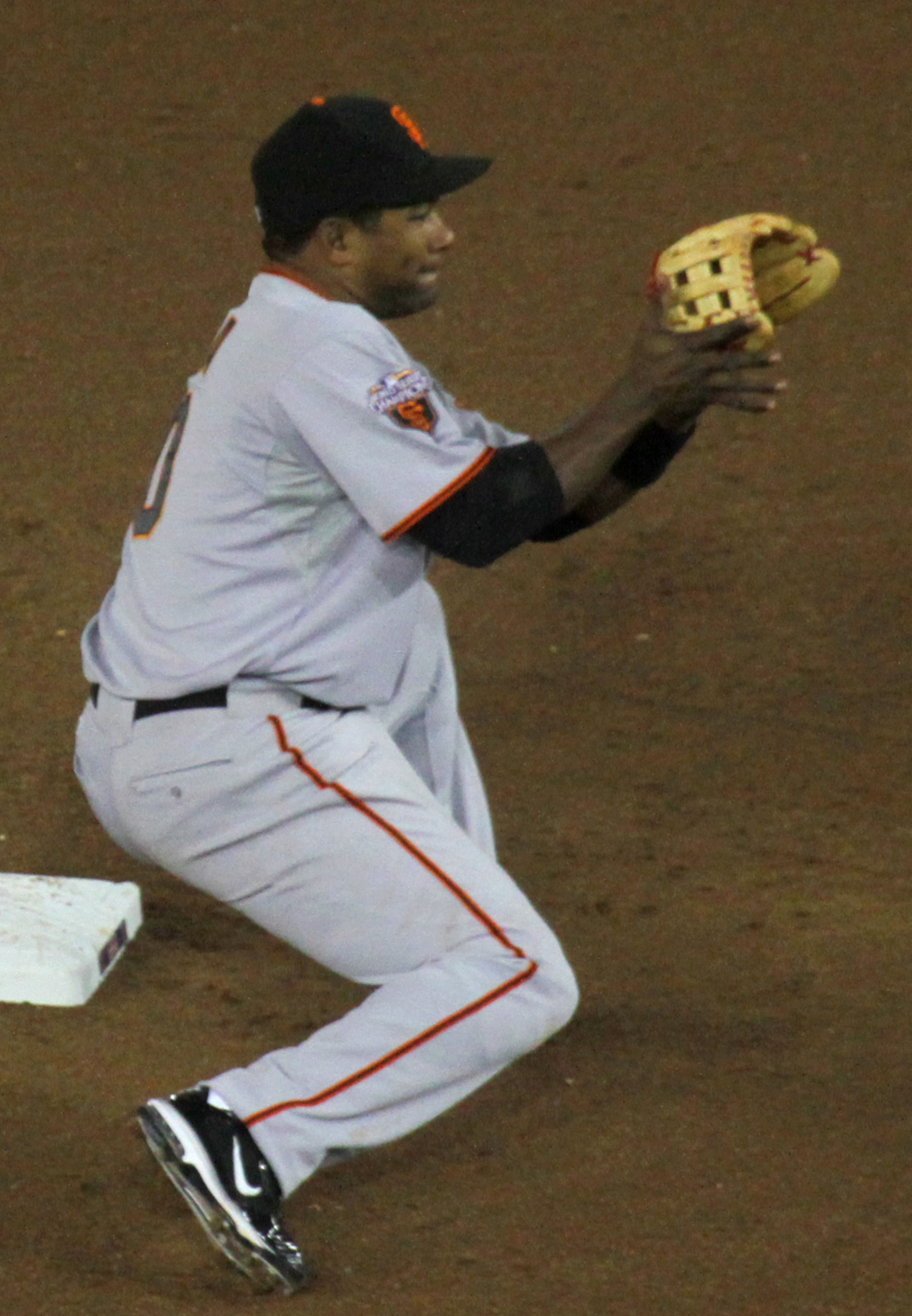
Tejada playing for the San Francisco Giants in 2011

Tejada signed a one-year, $6.5 million, contract with the San Francisco Giants. He was designated for assignment on August 31, 2011 after batting .239 with four home runs and 26 RBIs in 91 games. He was released on September 8, 2011.

=== Third stint with the Orioles ===
On May 6, 2012, Tejada reached an agreement on a contract with the Orioles. He failed to make the Major League club's roster however, and played for their Triple-A affiliate Norfolk team until requesting his outright release, which was granted on June 25, 2012.

=== Kansas City Royals (2013) ===
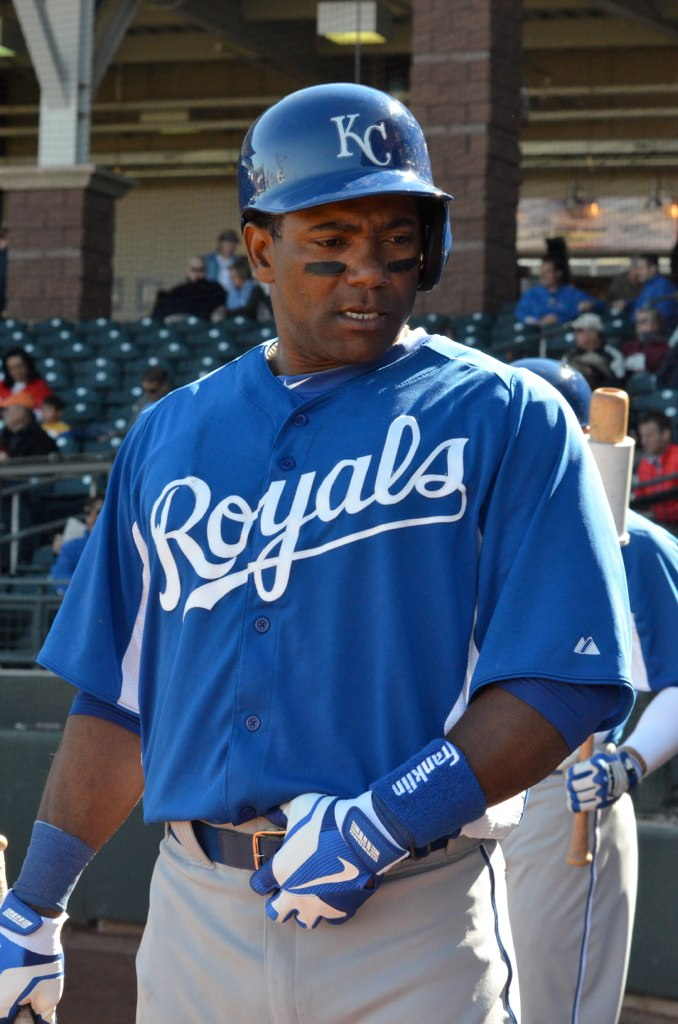
Tejada with the Royals in 2013

On December 31, 2012, Tejada signed a minor league contract with the Kansas City Royals. According to the Associated Press, he was to earn $1.1 million plus performance incentives worth an additional $400,000 if he made the Royals Major League 40-man roster for 2013.

On August 17, 2013, Tejada received a 105-game suspension from Major League Baseball following two positive drug tests for amphetamines. Tejada claimed to have been in the process of re-applying for a therapeutic use exemption as he used the drug to treat a medical condition, but he chose not to appeal the decision. Due to a calf injury suffered prior to the ban, Tejada was not likely to play in the remaining 41 games of the 2013 season anyway, though they counted toward his suspension. He also was not allowed to play in the first 64 games of the 2014 season.

=== Miami Marlins ===
On May 16, 2014, Tejada signed a minor league contract with the Miami Marlins. Tejada was required to serve the remaining 64 games left on his suspension before being available to be called up by the Marlins. On August 2, Tejada was released by the Marlins.

=== Pericos de Puebla ===
On April 4, 2015, Tejada signed with the Pericos de Puebla of the Mexican League. In 105 games he hit .324/.368/.446 with 7 home runs, 70 RBIs and 1 stolen base.

Tejada was eligible to be elected into the National Baseball Hall of Fame in 2019, but received less than 5% of the vote and became ineligible for the 2020 ballot. In August 2024, he was elected to the Oakland Athletics Hall of Fame.

=== Career statistics ===
In 2171 games over 16 seasons, Tejada posted a career .285 batting average (2407-for-8434) which includes 1230 runs, 468 doubles, 23 triples, 307 home runs, 1302 RBI, 85 stolen bases, 553 walks, .336 on-base percentage, and .456 slugging percentage. Defensively, he recorded an overall .971 fielding percentage primarily as a shortstop.

== Controversies ==
=== Steroid allegations and suspensions ===
On September 22, 2005, ESPN reported that Rafael Palmeiro, who had tested positive for steroids and was suspended for 10 games under Major League Baseball's steroid policy, implicated Tejada to baseball's arbitration panel, suggesting that a supplement given to him by Tejada was responsible for the steroid entering his system. Tejada denied the allegations, saying that the only thing he gave Palmeiro was vitamin B-12, a legal substance under MLB policy.

On September 24, 2005, the Baltimore Sun reported that "The Health Policy Advisory Committee, which oversees baseball's testing policy, issued a statement that exonerated Tejada and chastised the media for reporting that he might have distributed steroids to another player."

In José Canseco's 2005 book, Juiced: Wild Times, Rampant 'Roids, Smash Hits & How Baseball Got Big, he mentioned that he believed Tejada might have taken steroids. He claims to have spoken to him about them and the next season seeing him at spring training looking more defined. He never claims to have injected him with them, like he did with Palmeiro, McGwire, and other ballplayers.

On September 30, 2006, the Los Angeles Times reported that former relief pitcher Jason Grimsley, during a June 6, 2006, federal raid, told federal agents investigating steroids in baseball named Tejada as a user of "anabolic steroids." The Times reported that Tejada was one of five names blacked out in an affidavit filed in federal court. However, on October 3, 2006, the Washington Post reported that San Francisco United States attorney Kevin Ryan said that the Los Angeles Times report contained "significant inaccuracies." Tejada, along with the other four players named, denounced the story.

On December 13, 2007, Tejada was mentioned in the Mitchell Report in connection to steroids. In the report, Tejada is said to have received $1,500 worth of steroids.

A report surfaced on January 15, 2008, stating that Rep. Henry Waxman had asked the Justice Department to investigate whether Tejada was truthful when speaking to the House committee when being interviewed in 2005 regarding possible connections to Rafael Palmeiro.

On February 10, 2009, Tejada was charged with lying to Congress about performance-enhancing drug usage in Major League Baseball. On February 11, Tejada pleaded guilty to charges that he lied to Congress in 2005. He faced up to one year in federal prison and deportation. On March 26, 2009, he received one-year probation.

On August 17, 2013, Tejada was suspended 105 games for testing positive twice for amphetamines, specifically the prescription medication adderall. Tejada claimed he had medical permission from MLB to use the drug to treat ADD, but it expired on April 15, 2013, and he continued to use it without gaining a new permission from MLB. The suspension was the third-longest non-lifetime ban issued by MLB for a drug violation.

=== Age ===
On April 17, 2008, Tejada was confronted by an ESPN reporter during a sit-down interview with documentation revealing that Tejada had been lying about his age ever since he first signed a Major League Baseball contract in 1993. Tejada had claimed to have been born in 1976 when a Dominican birth certificate showed that he was born in 1974 as "Miguel Tejeda." He struggled to take off his microphone and kept questioning who the interviewer was referring to. Tejada stormed off the set, ending the interview. Before the interview was aired on April 22, 2008, he acknowledged having been born in 1974.

== Post-playing career ==
On June 5, 2023, Tejada was appointed the manager of the Karachi Monarchs, a Pakistan-based franchise in the Baseball United league, which plans to bring baseball to South Asia and the Middle East.

On February 10, 2025, Tejada was hired to serve as the bench coach for the Bravos de León of the Mexican League. On May 6, he was promoted to manager after the Bravos dismissed Matías Carrillo.

== Personal life ==
Tejada has a chicken farm in Florida where he lives with his wife, Alejandra, and his daughter, Alexa. His son, Miguel Jr., was a shortstop in the Philadelphia Phillies organization.

Tejada was childhood friends with Mario Encarnación and, when Encarnación died in Taiwan in 2005, Tejada paid for his body to be transported back to the Dominican Republic and for a headstone at a cemetery in Baní.

On August 20, 2015, Reorg Research reported that Tejada had filed for bankruptcy.

== See also ==
- Houston Astros award winners and league leaders
- List of Houston Astros team records
- List of Major League Baseball annual doubles leaders
- List of Major League Baseball career assists leaders
- List of Major League Baseball career doubles leaders
- List of Major League Baseball consecutive games played leaders
- List of Major League Baseball career hit by pitch leaders
- List of Major League Baseball career hits leaders
- List of Major League Baseball career home run leaders
- List of Major League Baseball career putouts as a shortstop leaders
- List of Major League Baseball career runs batted in leaders
- List of Major League Baseball career runs scored leaders
- List of Major League Baseball players suspended for performance-enhancing drugs
- List of Major League Baseball players from the Dominican Republic
- List of Major League Baseball players to hit for the cycle

Achievements
| Preceded by Jeff Frye | Hitting for the cycle September 29, 2001 | Succeeded by Craig Biggio |
