= Bobby Abreu =

Venezuelan baseball player (born 1974)

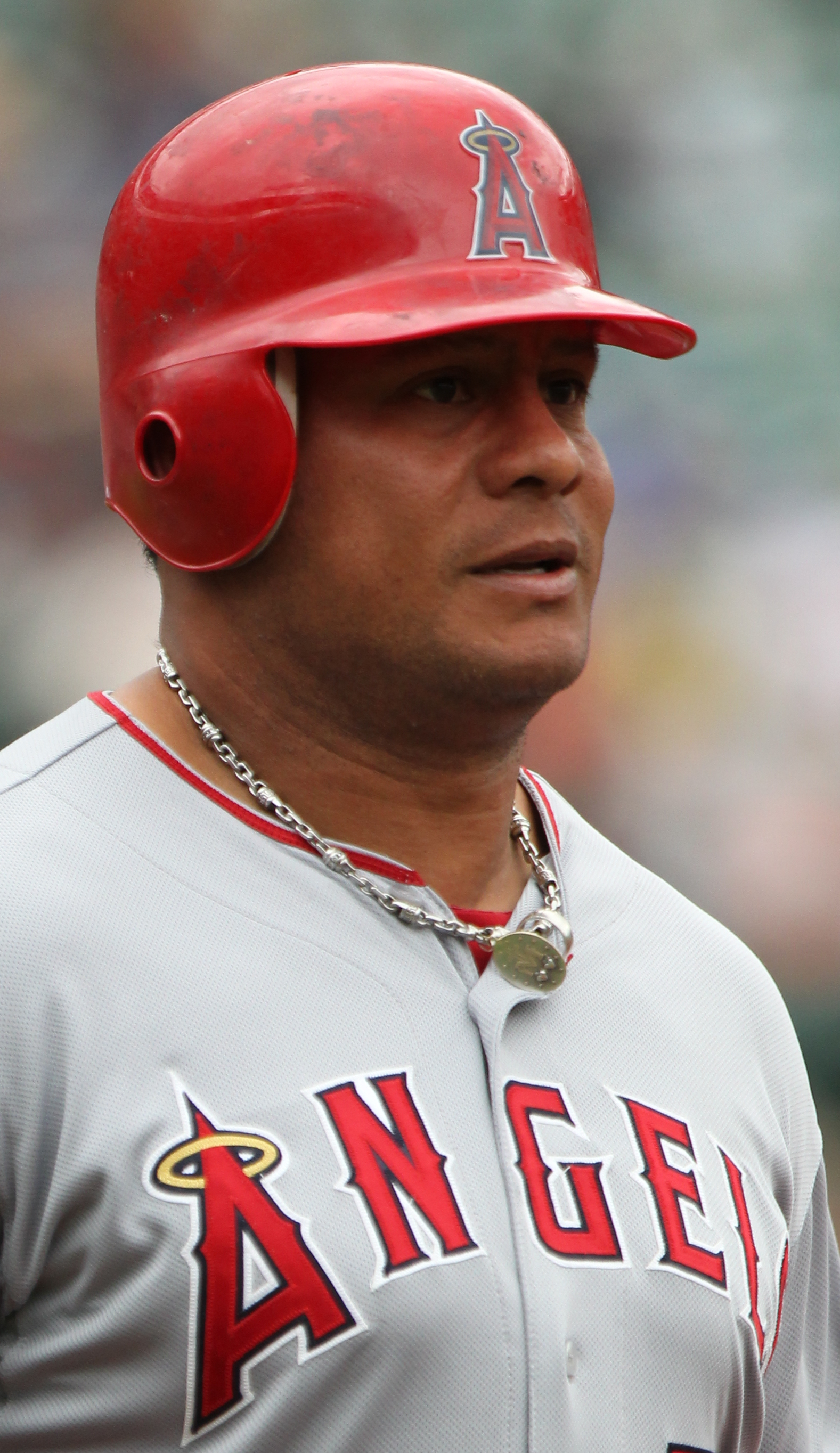
- Abreu with the Los Angeles Angels in 2011
- Right fielder
- Born: March 11, 1974 (age 52); Turmero, Venezuela
- Batted: Left Threw: Right

MLB debut
- September 1, 1996, for the Houston Astros

Last MLB appearance
- September 28, 2014, for the New York Mets

MLB statistics
- Batting average: .291
- Hits: 2,470
- Home runs: 288
- Runs batted in: 1,363
- Stolen bases: 400
- Stats at Baseball Reference

Teams
- Houston Astros (1996–1997); Philadelphia Phillies (1998–2006); New York Yankees (2006–2008); Los Angeles Angels of Anaheim (2009–2012); Los Angeles Dodgers (2012); New York Mets (2014)

Career highlights and awards
- 2× All-Star (2004, 2005); Gold Glove Award (2005); Silver Slugger Award (2004); Philadelphia Phillies Wall of Fame

Bob Kelly Abreu (/əˈbreɪ.uː/; Spanish: [boβ aˈβɾew]; born March 11, 1974), nicknamed "El Comedulce" and "La Leche", is a Venezuelan former professional baseball right fielder. He played in Major League Baseball (MLB) for the Houston Astros, Philadelphia Phillies, New York Yankees, Los Angeles Angels of Anaheim, Los Angeles Dodgers, and New York Mets.

Abreu is a two-time All-Star, and has won a Gold Glove Award and a Silver Slugger Award. He has been a single-season league leader in games played (twice), doubles, and triples. He had two seasons in which he collected thirty home runs and thirty stolen bases, making him one of thirteen players to have achieved the 30–30 club twice in a career. Through 2014, Abreu led active ballplayers in doubles (565), walks (1,456), and outfield assists (136), was fifth in runs scored (1,441) and stolen bases (400), seventh in extra-base hits (911) and on-base percentage (.396), and tenth in runs batted in (1,363). He is also one of only seven players ever to record at least 900 career extra-base hits and steal at least 400 bases along with Barry Bonds, Ty Cobb, Tris Speaker, Craig Biggio, Honus Wagner, and Paul Molitor. Of these, all but Bonds and Abreu are in the National Baseball Hall of Fame.

== Career ==
=== Houston Astros ===
Abreu was signed as an amateur free agent by the Houston Astros on August 21, 1990. He was the Astros Minor League Player of the Year in 1996 and made his Major League debut on September 1, 1996, against the Pittsburgh Pirates. He was announced as a pinch hitter but did not get to bat because he was subsequently pinch hit for by Mike Simms. He had his first official at-bat the following day against the St. Louis Cardinals when he flied out to left field as a pinch hitter in the top of the sixth inning. After a few more appearances as a pinch hitter or late inning defensive replacement, he made his first start in left field against the Colorado Rockies on September 6, going hitless in four at-bats with two strikeouts. Abreu's first Major League hit was a single to right field as a pinch hitter against Bobby Jones of the New York Mets on September 24. He finished his first season with five hits in 22 at-bats. He hit his first two home runs in the same game on April 28, 1997, against Jamey Wright and Steve Reed of the Colorado Rockies. He played in 59 games for the Astros in 1997, hitting .250 with three home runs and 26 RBI.

Left unprotected in the 1997 MLB Expansion Draft when the Astros decided to keep fellow Venezuelan outfielder Richard Hidalgo, Abreu was selected by the then Tampa Bay Devil Rays, only to be dealt hours later to the Phillies for shortstop Kevin Stocker, a trade regarded among the worst in MLB history.

=== Philadelphia Phillies ===
==== 1998–2003 seasons ====
In 1998, his first season with the Phillies, Abreu led the team with a .312 batting average and collected 17 home runs, 74 RBI, and 19 stolen bases in 151 games, with 271 putouts and 17 assists in right field.

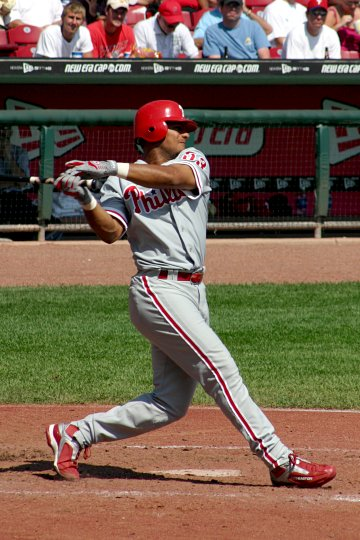
Abreu with the Philadelphia Phillies in 2004

In 1999, Abreu made a brief run at the batting title. His .335 career-high average that season ranked third in the National League and was the highest posted by a Phillies player since outfielder Tony González hit .339 in 1967. His .446 career-high OBP was third in the league and he tied for the league lead in triples with 11.

In 2000, Abreu finished fourth in the league in triples (10), sixth in doubles (42), seventh in walks (100), and ninth in OBP (.416). Abreu became the first Phillie outfielder since Greg Luzinski with back-to-back 20 homer seasons. In 2001, Abreu led the NL in games played (162), and was third in walks (106), fourth in stolen bases (36) and doubles (48), and eighth in runs (118) and sacrifice flies (9). He also hit a career-high 31 home runs and had a career-high 110 RBI.

For the 2002 season, Abreu led the league in doubles (50), and was sixth in walks (104), seventh in stolen bases (31) and intentional walks (13), eighth in OBP (.413), ninth in hits (176), and tenth in runs (102). In 2003, Abreu was fourth in the league in walks (109), seventh in sacrifice flies (7), eighth in OBP (.409), and ninth in stolen bases (22).

==== 2004 season ====
In 2004, Abreu got his first All-Star berth, being voted in as the National League All-Star Final Vote winner in online voting on MLB.com.

Abreu hit the first home run at Citizens Bank Park on Opening Day, April 12, 2004. He finished the season with a .301 average, 30 home runs, and 105 RBI, and ranked among the National League top five in five offensive categories: runs (fourth, 118) -- the third time in six years that he scored 118 runs, doubles (fourth, 47), stolen bases (third, 40—a career high), walks (second, 127—a career high) and on-base percentage (fifth, .428). Abreu became the first player in major league history to record 30 home runs, 40 doubles, 40 stolen bases, and 100 walks in a single season. He also led the Major Leagues in pitches-per-plate-appearance (4.32) and number of pitches seen (3,077), was eighth-highest in the league in total bases (312), and posted the league's tenth-best OPS (.971).

==== 2005 season ====
In May, Abreu was honored as the Player of the Month in the National League, after he hit .396 and 11 home runs. He also led the NL for the month in slugging average (.792), on-base percentage (.535), and walks (30) and was tied for the league lead with 30 RBI. He became the first player in Major League history to hit at least one home run in nine out of ten team games.

He was voted a starter in the NL outfield for the All-Star Game, finishing second in fan voting, behind St. Louis Cardinals outfielder Jim Edmonds. Prior to the All-Star Game at Comerica Park in Detroit, Abreu won the Home Run Derby as he set records with 24 home runs in a single round (since broken by Josh Hamilton in 2008), and 41 overall, topping Miguel Tejada's previous marks of 15 and 27 set one year earlier. Abreu's longest homer was measured at 517 feet, the third longest in Derby history.

=== New York Yankees ===
==== 2006 season ====
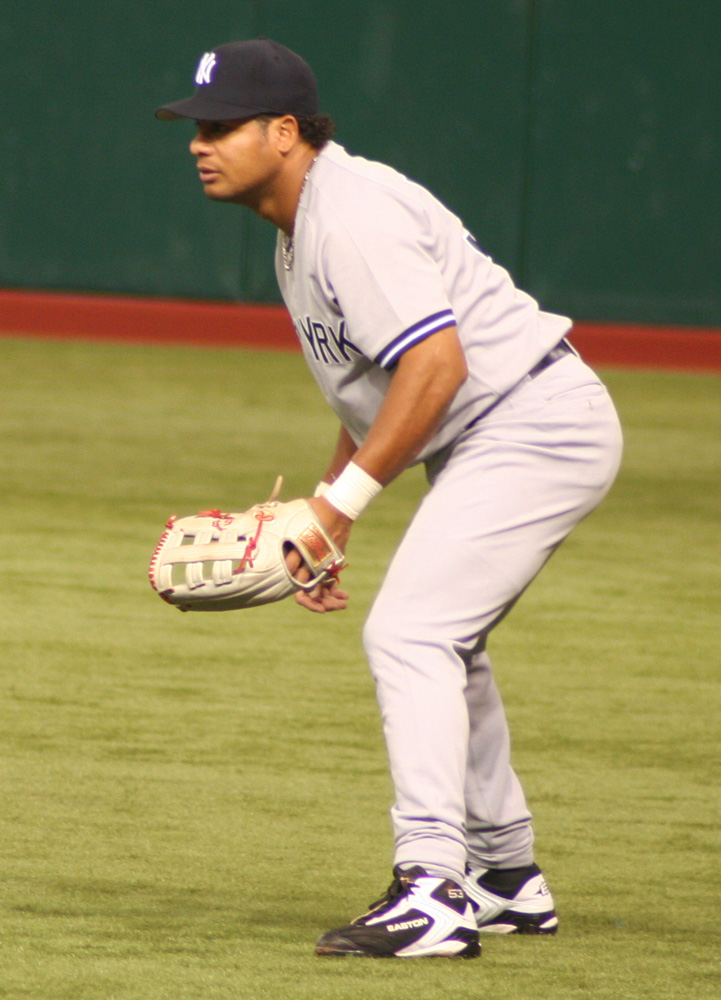
Abreu with the New York Yankees in 2006

On July 30, 2006, Abreu was traded along with Cory Lidle to the New York Yankees for minor league shortstop C. J. Henry (a 2005 first-round draft pick), left-hander Matt Smith (a seven-year minor league veteran), catcher Jesus Sanchez, and right-hander Carlos Monasterios—all low-level prospects in the Yankee organization. Philadelphia Daily News columnist Bill Conlin called the trade "the Great Gillick Giveaway" and declared it "an unvarnished disaster." The Phillies actually improved after the Abreu trade and made a run for the National League wild card, only to be eliminated on the second to last day of the season.

Abreu fit well into the Yankees lineup. He batted .297 with 15 home runs and 107 RBI in the 2006 season. The Yankees ran away with the AL East division title by mid-September 2006, but were eliminated by the Detroit Tigers in the 2006 American League Division Series.

In 2006, Abreu led the major leagues in walks (124), pitches per plate appearance (4.45), and number of pitches seen (3,056), and was second in the major leagues in percent of plate appearances that were walks (18.5%), and led the AL in percentage of pitches taken (66.2), and in walks per plate appearance (.181), third in batting average on balls in play (.375), eighth in on-base percentage (.424), 18th in stolen bases (30), and 19th in doubles (41).

On September 12, 2006, Abreu drove in six runs in the first inning of the Yankees' 12–4 victory over the Tampa Bay Devil Rays. Abreu began the 9-run inning by homering with Johnny Damon and Derek Jeter on base, then concluded it with a bases-loaded double that scored Hideki Matsui, Melky Cabrera and Jeter. The six RBIs tied Gil McDougald's 55-year franchise record for most in one inning (McDougald batted in six runs in one inning in 1951, his rookie season). Alex Rodriguez broke the record shared by Abreu and McDougald by driving in seven runs in the sixth inning of 2009 regular season finale, also against Tampa Bay.

==== 2007 and 2008 seasons ====
After getting off to a slow start in (2007), Abreu finished the season strong putting up 101 RBI, 16 home runs and a .283 batting average. In 2007, Abreu was second in the AL in runs (123), third in pitches per plate appearance (4.38), ninth in games (158) and times on base (258), and tenth in walks (84) and plate appearances (699).

Abreu hit a walk-off double on July 9, 2008, against the Tampa Bay Rays. On September 18, Abreu hit two home runs and had 6 RBI in a game versus the Chicago White Sox and Javier Vázquez. He finished the season with a .296 average, 20 home runs, and 100 RBI. He had the last stolen base in the original Yankee Stadium on September 21, 2008.

=== Los Angeles Angels of Anaheim ===
==== 2009 season ====
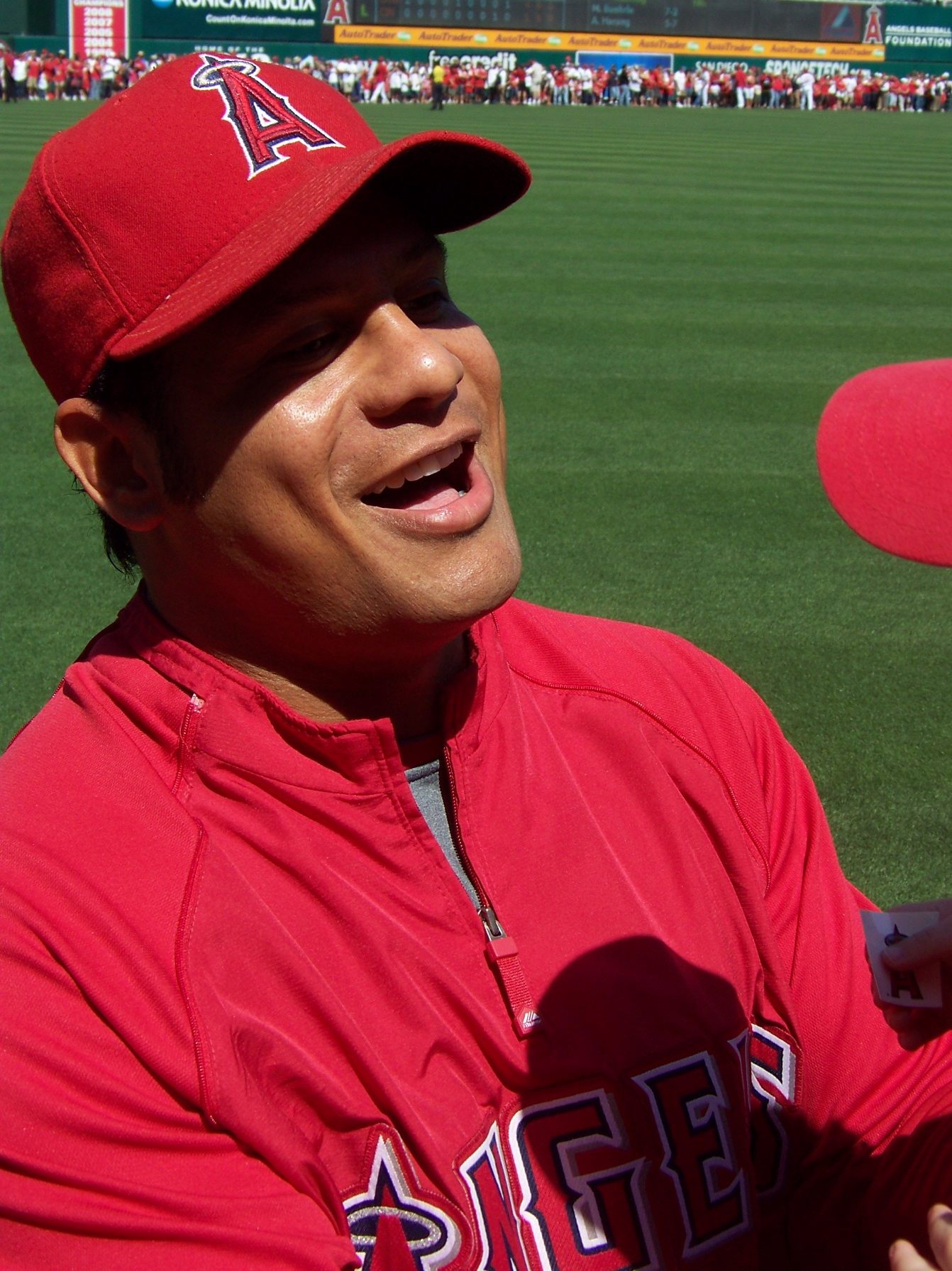
Abreu with the Angels in 2009

On February 12, 2009, Abreu signed a $5 million, one-year deal with the Los Angeles Angels of Anaheim, and was expected to play left field. However, after Vladimir Guerrero was moved to DH due to injury, Abreu saw more action at his natural position in right field.

After struggling early in the season, Abreu hit .380 with 28 RBI in 26 games in July and was named the American League Player of the Month. Abreu became the first Angels player to reach those figures in batting average and RBI in one calendar month since Tim Salmon, who hit .390 with 32 RBI in 27 games in July 1997.

On August 6, Abreu hit his 250th career home run when he led off the fifth inning with a solo home run off Chicago White Sox pitcher John Danks. Abreu became one of only six players in major league history to collect 250 home runs, 2,000 hits, 1,000 runs, 1,000 runs batted in, 1,000 walks and 300 stolen bases. In 2009, he led the AL in errors by an outfielder, with 8.

Though Abreu stated that he enjoyed his season with the Angels and was credited with helping many of the team's younger players to improve their swings and patience at the plate, he turned down a two-year, $16 million extension on his contract on October 15.

==== 2010–2012 seasons ====
On November 5, 2009, the first day eligible players could file for free agency, Abreu accepted a two-year deal with the Angels, with a club option for 2012. He cited the Angels manager, Mike Scioscia as one of the reasons, saying "He's one of those managers that lets you play the game, and he gives you big support." He also noted the organization publicly recognized his career achievements and consistently delivered opportunities to succeed in the postseason, saying, "This is a team that gives you an opportunity always to be in the playoffs. This time, my first time with them, I was very close to getting to the World Series, so why not stay? Of course you want a team that is going to give you opportunities to be in the World Series and win the World Series. I don't want to take a chance with someone else."

During the 2011–2012 offseason, the New York Yankees proposed a trade to the Angels that would have sent starting pitcher A. J. Burnett to Anaheim for Abreu. Abreu would have become the Yankees' regular designated hitter, but Burnett vetoed the trade. On February 20, 2012, Burnett was traded to the Pittsburgh Pirates and the Yankees signed Raúl Ibañez to be the DH. Abreu was already annoyed that he would not be playing every day for the Angels, and when he learned what Burnett had done, he ordered Angels' management to either play him every day as the designated hitter or trade him. Another proposed trade, which would have sent Abreu to the Cleveland Indians for Lou Marson, fell through. Abreu was released by the Angels on April 27, 2012, and replaced on the roster by future Rookie of the Year and MVP Award winner Mike Trout.

=== Los Angeles Dodgers ===
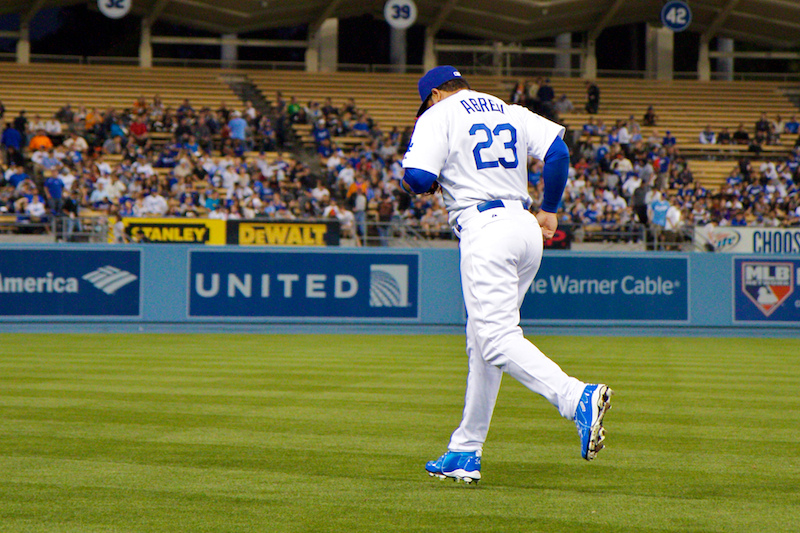
Abreu with the Los Angeles Dodgers in 2012

On May 4, 2012, Abreu signed a contract with the Los Angeles Dodgers. He was designated for assignment on August 1, 2012. Abreu cleared waivers and accepted an assignment to AAA Albuquerque. He had six hits in his 17 at-bats for the Isotopes before rejoining the Dodgers as a September call-up, spending the last month of the season as a pinch hitter. He played in 92 games with the Dodgers, hitting .246 with three home runs and 19 RBI.

=== Second stint with Phillies ===
After sitting out the 2013 season, Abreu participated in the 2013–14 Venezuelan Winter League and logged a .322 batting average in 180 plate appearances with Leones del Caracas. On January 21, 2014, Abreu signed a minor league contract with the Phillies. He was released before the season on March 27.

=== New York Mets ===
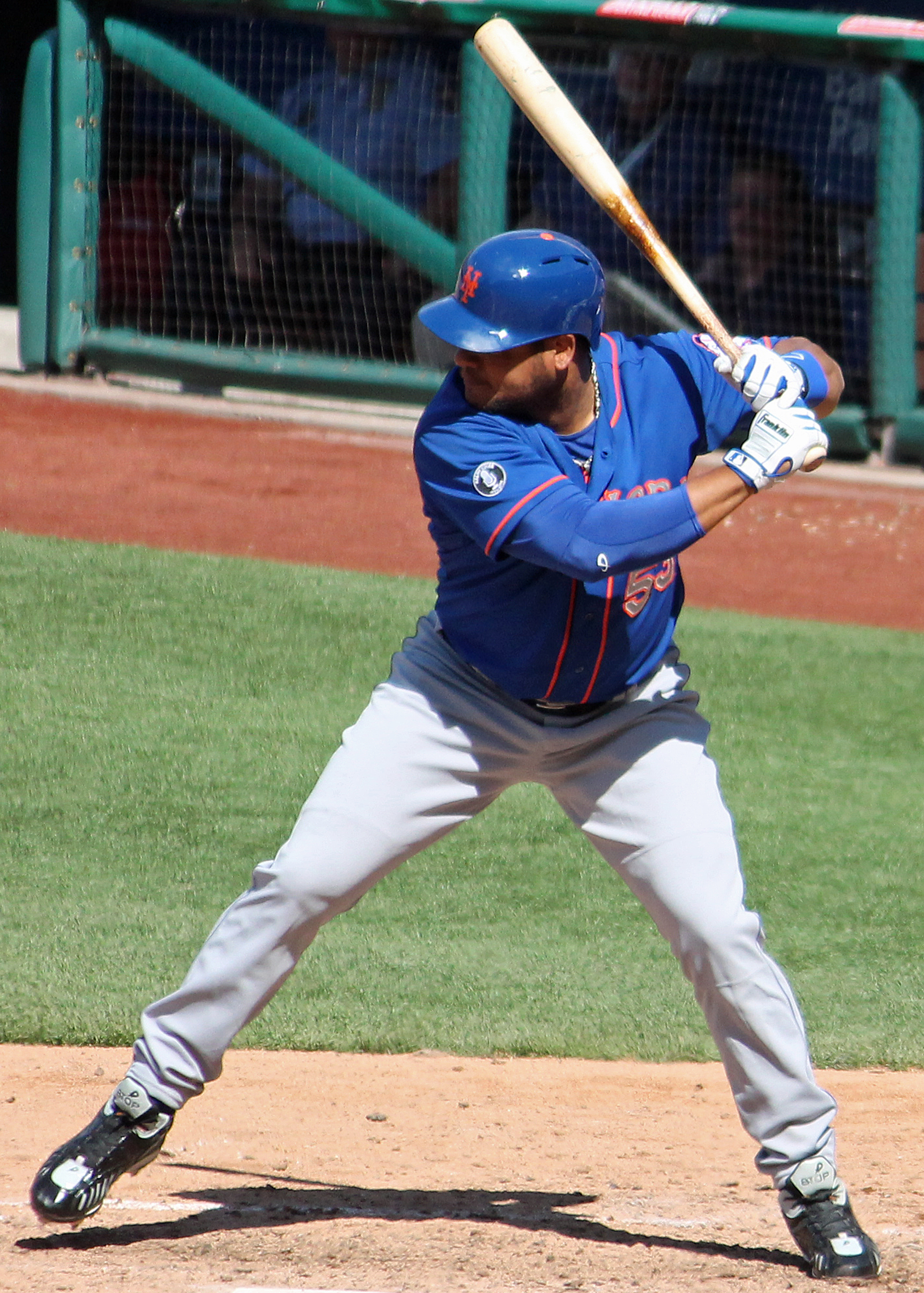
Abreu with the New York Mets in 2014

On March 31, 2014, Abreu signed a minor league deal with the New York Mets. On April 21, the Mets promoted Abreu from the Triple-A Las Vegas 51s, after trading Ike Davis to the Pittsburgh Pirates. He was designated for assignment on August 4 and officially released on August 10. However, just four days later on August 14, the Mets re-signed Abreu to another minor league contract. He was called back up to the majors on September 9, 2014. Abreu announced his retirement from baseball on September 26. He singled in his final at-bat on September 28.

== Batting style ==
Abreu was noted for his plate discipline. In 2009, he led the American League in percent of pitches taken at 67.5%, while also having the fourth lowest percentage of swinging at the first pitch at 9.5%.

== Career statistics ==
In 2,425 games over 18 seasons, Abreu posted a .291 batting average (2,470-for-8,480) with 1,453 runs, 574 doubles, 59 triples, 288 home runs, 1,363 RBI, 400 stolen bases, 1,476 bases on balls, .395 on-base percentage and .475 slugging percentage. Defensively, he recorded a .982 fielding percentage at all three outfield positions. In 20 postseason games, he hit .284 (19-for-67) with nine runs, six doubles, one home run, 9 RBI, two stolen bases and 12 walks.

Abreu logged 60.2 Wins Above Replacement (WAR). Among right fielders, this is 19th best all time, and he is one of 191 players as of 2026 with a WAR over 60. In the span of his career, just nine other players had more hits than Abreu did.

== Awards ==
- 1996 Houston Astros Minor League Player of the Year
- 1999 Venezuelan Winter League All-Star OF
- 1999 Venezuelan Winter League Player of the Year
- 1999 Philadelphia Phillies Player of the Year
- 2000 Philadelphia Phillies Player of the Year
- 2001 Philadelphia Phillies Player of the Year
- 2004 NL Silver Slugger Award (OF)
- 2004 MLB All-Star
- 2005 NL Player of the Month (April)
- 2005 NL Gold Glove Award (OF)
- 2005 MLB All-Star
- 2005 Winner of the Home Run Derby at the MLB All-Star game (41 home runs over 3 rounds)
- 2009 AL Player of the Month (July)

=== National Baseball Hall of Fame consideration ===
Abreu was listed on 2020 Baseball Hall of Fame balloting; other than Derek Jeter, he was the only first-year candidate to receive at least 5% of the vote, enabling him to appear on the 2021 ballot, when he garnered 8.7%, thus qualifying him to appear on the 2022 ballot, where he fell to 8.6%. In 2023, he rose to 15.4%, but his support has stagnated since then, receiving 14.8% in 2024 and 19.5% in 2025, his 6th year of eligibility.

== Personal life ==
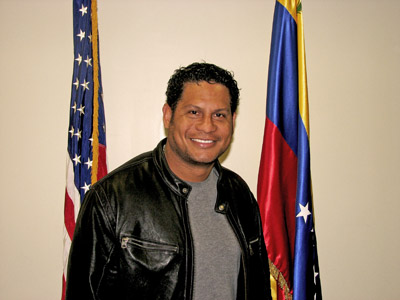
Abreu in 2009

Abreu dated former Miss Universe Alicia Machado; the couple later split, calling off their engagement.

Abreu is the owner of Mineros de Guyana, a soccer team based in Puerto Ordaz.

=== In the community ===
Abreu was involved in many events in the Philadelphia metropolitan area. In 2001, he was the Honorary Chairman for the American Red Cross Blood Drive.

Abreu bought $10,000 worth of tickets to most Friday night games for children in his "Abreu's Amigos" organization during the 2003 and 2004 seasons. In this program, the children got jerseys, coupons for concessions, and chances to meet Abreu on the field during batting practice.

Abreu was the 2004 recipient of the Phillies Community Service award and the Phillies' representative for MLB's Roberto Clemente Award.

In 2008, Abreu made a contribution to the Police Athletic League of New York City through his Abreu's Finest charity to provide boys and girls with recreational, educational, cultural and social programs.

Abreu is known as "El Comedulce" in Venezuela. The name translates roughly to "the candy-eater", which had been his father Nelson Abreu's nickname. Following Nelson's death, Abreu "began asking people to call him the same name as a way of honoring his father's memory."

== See also ==
- 30–30 club
- List of Major League Baseball career home run leaders
- List of Major League Baseball career hits leaders
- List of Major League Baseball career runs scored leaders
- List of Major League Baseball career runs batted in leaders
- List of Major League Baseball career doubles leaders
- List of Major League Baseball career stolen bases leaders
- List of Major League Baseball career total bases leaders
- List of Major League Baseball annual doubles leaders
- List of Major League Baseball annual triples leaders
- List of NL Silver Slugger winners at outfield

Awards and achievements
Preceded by Derrek Lee	National League Player of the Month; May 2005	Succeeded by Andruw Jones
Preceded by B. J. Upton	American League Player of the Month; July 2009	Succeeded by Kendry Morales
