= C. J. Henry =

American basketball and baseball player (born 1986)

Personal information
- Born: May 31, 1986 (age 40) Oklahoma City, Oklahoma, U.S.
- Listed height: 6 ft 3 in (1.91 m)
- Listed weight: 200 lb (91 kg)

Career information
- High school: Putnam City (Oklahoma City, Oklahoma)
- College: Kansas (2009–2010); Southern Nazarene (2010–2011)
- Position: Point guard
- Number: 13

Carl Joshua Henry Jr. (born May 31, 1986) is an American former basketball and professional baseball player. Henry played in minor and independent baseball and college for the Southern Nazarene University men's basketball team.

== Early life ==
Henry is the son of Carl Henry Sr., a former professional basketball player. His younger brother is Xavier Henry.

Henry attended Putnam City High School in Oklahoma City, where he starred in basketball and baseball. He was named to the 2005 USA Today All-USA high school baseball team and became a top prospect. He was also heavily recruited as a point guard and committed to play for the Kansas Jayhawks team on May 19, 2005, choosing the Jayhawks over North Carolina and Texas.

== Baseball ==
Henry was drafted by the New York Yankees in the first round (17th overall) of the 2005 Major League Baseball draft and signed, receiving a $1.6 million bonus.

He played for the Gulf Coast Yankees and Charleston RiverDogs, before being traded by the Yankees to the Philadelphia Phillies in the deal that sent Bobby Abreu and Cory Lidle to the Yankees.

Henry played for the Lakewood BlueClaws of the Phillies' organization, but was released following the 2007 season. The Yankees re-signed Henry, assigning him to the Class-A Advanced Tampa Yankees for the 2008 season. In 272 minor-league games, Henry hit .222 and made 57 errors. Following his continuing baseball struggles, Henry left baseball and returned to basketball.

== Basketball ==
Henry was a walk-on for the Memphis Tigers in the fall of 2008, as the Yankees were responsible for his college tuition. He redshirted for the 2008–09 season.

Henry's brother, Xavier, was a top recruit by John Calipari to attend Memphis beginning in the 2009–10 year. However, when Calipari left to accept the coaching job for the Kentucky Wildcats, the Henry brothers decided to commit to the Kansas Jayhawks, with Xavier released from his letter of intent with Memphis, and C. J. transferring.

C. J. was a redshirt freshman at Kansas in the 2009–10 year, and he was eligible to play for the 2009-10 Kansas Jayhawks men's basketball team. On August 27, 2010, NAIA school Southern Nazarene University announced that Henry had transferred there. He became a starter and the team's leading scorer in the 2010–11 season.

College recruiting
Name	Hometown	School	Height	Weight	Commit date
C. J. Henry; SG	Oklahoma City, OK	Putnam City HS	6 ft 3 in (1.91 m)	200 lb (91 kg)	
C. J. Henry; SG	Recruit ratings: Scout: Rivals: (N/A)				
