= All-Star Final Vote =

Annual Internet and text message ballot

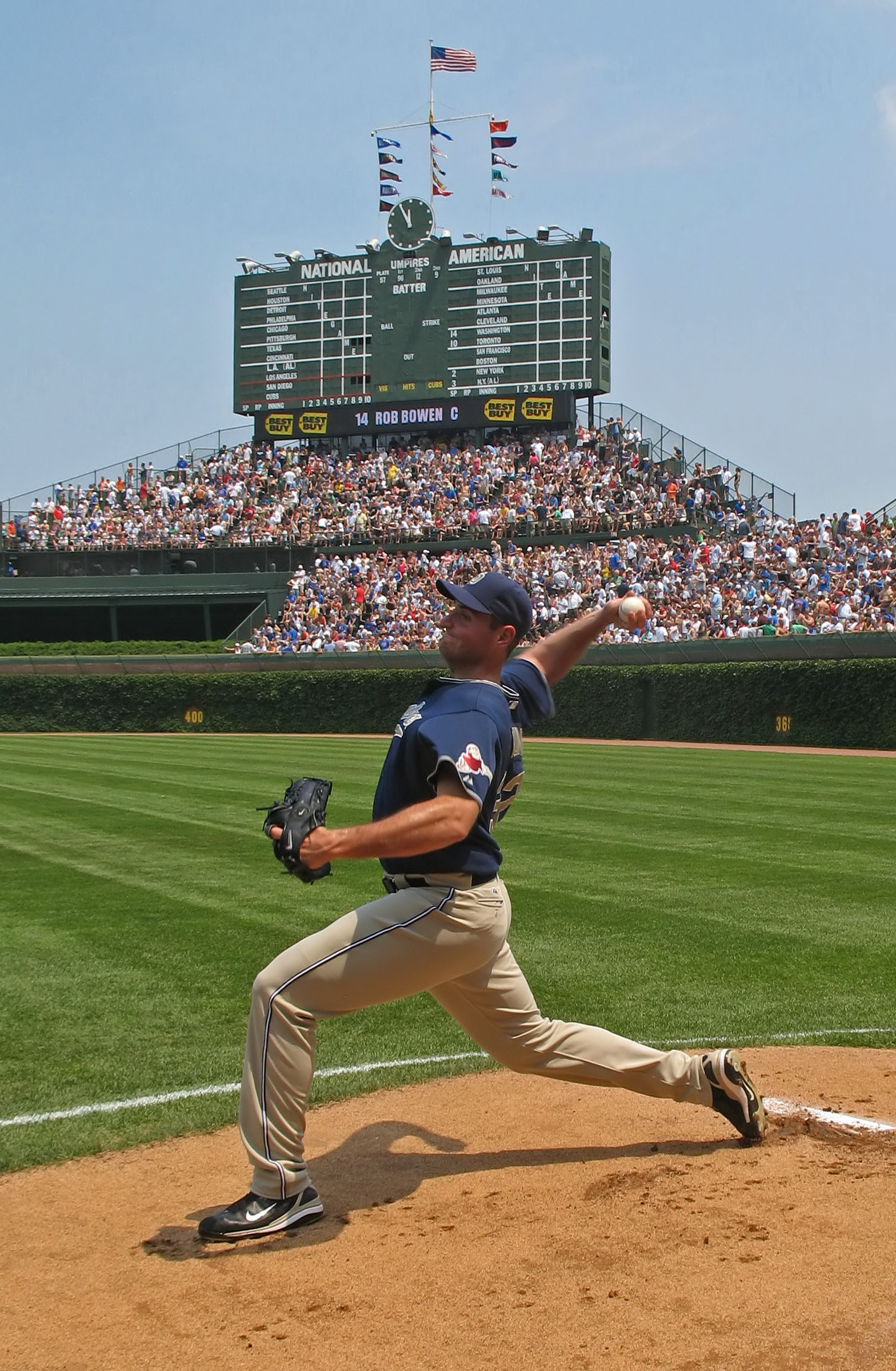
- 2007 National League All-Star Final Vote winner Chris Young warming up in the Wrigley Field bullpen
- Awarded for: Yearly final Major League Baseball All-Star Game selection
- Country: United States & Canada
- Presented by: Major League Baseball
- First award: 2002
- Final award: 2018
- Website: http://vote.mlb.com/

The All-Star Final Vote was an annual Internet and text message ballot by Major League Baseball (MLB) fans to elect the final player for each team that participates in the Major League Baseball All-Star Game, after all other selections were made and announced. The first 33 players were selected by a combination of procedures. The sponsorship changed annually, but the contest remained similar from year to year. Each league presented a five-man ballot and gave the fans a few days to choose one final All-Star. This process was used from 2002 through 2018.

== All-Star selection ==
The All-Star Game managers selected the entire lineups from 1933 to 1946. In 1947, the fans were given the ability to select the starting lineups. This continued until 1957, when Cincinnati Reds fans stuffed the ballot box and selected seven Reds and Stan Musial. This forced Commissioner Ford Frick to step in and replace Wally Post and Gus Bell with Willie Mays and Hank Aaron that season and to turn over the starting lineup selection to players, coaches and managers for several subsequent seasons. Since 1970, the fans have elected the starting lineup of one player for each baseball position (except the pitcher) for both the National League and American League teams.

In 2003, the major league players began electing a reserve for each position as well as five starters and three relievers, although the All-Star game managers performed this duty once. Now, the "Player ballot" includes coaches, managers and players across both leagues who participate in choosing eight reserves and eight pitchers for each All-Star team. Now, the managers only select the starting pitcher from among those pitchers already elected by the players. The managers also select the remainder of the roster spots except for the final spot while ensuring that each team has at least one representative. The All-Star game manager, guided by the baseball commissioner's office, then selects a list of five nominees for the fans to choose from for the remaining roster spot for each league's team.

On the Sunday evening nine days before the scheduled All-Star game, the rosters are announced and the All-Star Final Vote nominees are announced on a nationally broadcast show. The voting commences after the announcement of the nominees toward the end of the show, and continues for a prescribed number of days. Generally, a single daily update of the ballot standings is released during the voting. After voting concludes, the top vote-getter for each league is announced. Over the course of the seven years of the voting, over 100 million votes have been cast.

== History ==
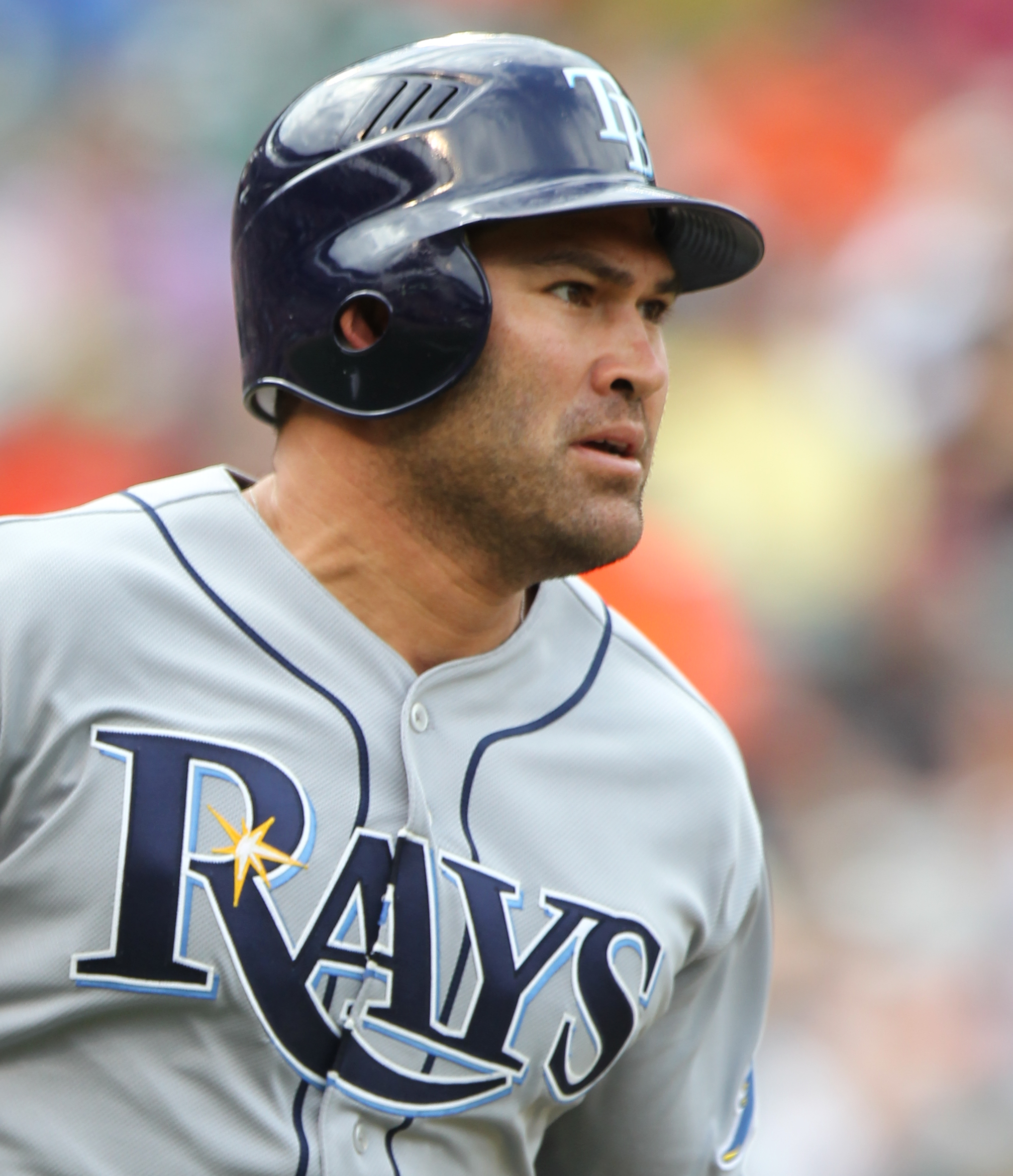
2002 American League All-Star Final Vote winner Johnny Damon was the first American League winner.

The first All-Star Final Vote was held during the 2002 season. The 2002 MLB All-Star Game had 30 player rosters so the fans were voting for the 30th player. The 2003 MLB All-Star Game rosters expanded to 32 following the 11-inning 2002 game. As a result, the fans elected the 32nd player. In 2009, the rosters again expanded to 33, including 13 pitchers, following the 15-inning 2008 MLB All-Star Game. In 2003, the first corporate sponsor got involved in the ballot. Over the years, the sponsor has changed and the name of the fan voting procedure has changed both with the changing sponsors and the number of roster spots. Billy Wagner is the only three-time nominee. Shane Victorino and Mike Moustakas are the only two-time winners. No second baseman or designated hitter has been elected.

In 2019, MLB discontinued the All-Star Final Vote.

=== Winners ===
Year	Player	Team	Position	Experience (All Star / Seasons)	Player	Team	Position	Experience (All Star / Seasons)
Year	American League				National League			
2002	Johnny Damon	BOS	CF	(0/8)	Andruw Jones	ATL	CF	(1/7)
2003	Jason Varitek	BOS	C	(0/7)	Geoff Jenkins	MIL	LF	(0/6)
2004	Hideki Matsui	NYY	LF	(1/2)	Bobby Abreu	PHI	RF	(0/9)
2005	Scott Podsednik	CHW	OF	(0/5)	Roy Oswalt	HOU	SP	(0/5)
2006	A. J. Pierzynski	CHW	C	(1/9)	Nomar Garciaparra	LAD	1B	(5/11)
2007	Hideki Okajima	BOS	RP	(0/1)	Chris Young	SD	SP	(0/4)
2008	Evan Longoria	TB	3B	(0/1)	Corey Hart	MIL	OF	(0/5)
2009	Brandon Inge	DET	3B	(0/9)	Shane Victorino	PHI	CF	(0/7)
2010	Nick Swisher	NYY	OF	(0/7)	Joey Votto	CIN	1B	(0/4)
2011	Paul Konerko	CHW	1B	(4/15)	Shane Victorino	PHI	OF	(1/8)
2012	Yu Darvish	TEX	SP	(0/1)	David Freese	STL	3B	(0/4)
2013	Steve Delabar	TOR	RP	(0/2)	Freddie Freeman	ATL	1B	(0/4)
2014	Chris Sale	CHW	SP	(2/4)	Anthony Rizzo	CHC	1B	(0/3)
2015	Mike Moustakas	KC	3B	(0/4)	Carlos Martínez	STL	SP	(0/2)
2016	Michael Saunders	TOR	OF	(0/8)	Brandon Belt	SF	1B	(0/6)
2017	Mike Moustakas	KC	3B	(1/6)	Justin Turner	LAD	3B	(0/8)
2018	Jean Segura	SEA	SS	(2/7)	Jesús Aguilar	MIL	1B	(1/5)

All charts include seasons (including the current one at the time of the voting) in which the player has appeared in a Major League game for years of experience. Below are some additional abbreviations used throughout. All-star game experience is based on the time of the final ballot nominations (before voting).

P – pitcher
SP – starting pitcher
RP – relief pitcher
C – catcher
1B – first baseman
2B – second baseman
SS – shortstop

3B – third baseman
RF – right fielder
CF – center fielder
LF – left fielder
OF – outfielder
DH – designated hitter

ANA – Anaheim Angels (until 2004) / LAA (2005–present) – Los Angeles Angels of Anaheim
ARZ – Arizona Diamondbacks
ATL – Atlanta Braves
BAL – Baltimore Orioles
BOS – Boston Red Sox
CHC – Chicago Cubs
CHW – Chicago White Sox
CIN – Cincinnati Reds
CLE – Cleveland Indians
COL – Colorado Rockies

DET – Detroit Tigers
FLA – Florida Marlins (until 2011) / MIA (2012–present) – Miami Marlins
HOU – Houston Astros
KC – Kansas City Royals
LAD – Los Angeles Dodgers
MIL – Milwaukee Brewers
MIN – Minnesota Twins
MTL - Montreal Expos (until 2004) / WSH (2005–present) – Washington Nationals
NYM – New York Mets
NYY – New York Yankees

OAK – Oakland Athletics
PHI – Philadelphia Phillies
PIT – Pittsburgh Pirates
SD – San Diego Padres
SF – San Francisco Giants
SEA – Seattle Mariners
STL – St. Louis Cardinals
TB – Tampa Bay Devil Rays/Rays
TEX – Texas Rangers
TOR – Toronto Blue Jays

== Results ==
Key
*	Election winners
^	All-Star Game substitutes

=== 2002 candidates ===
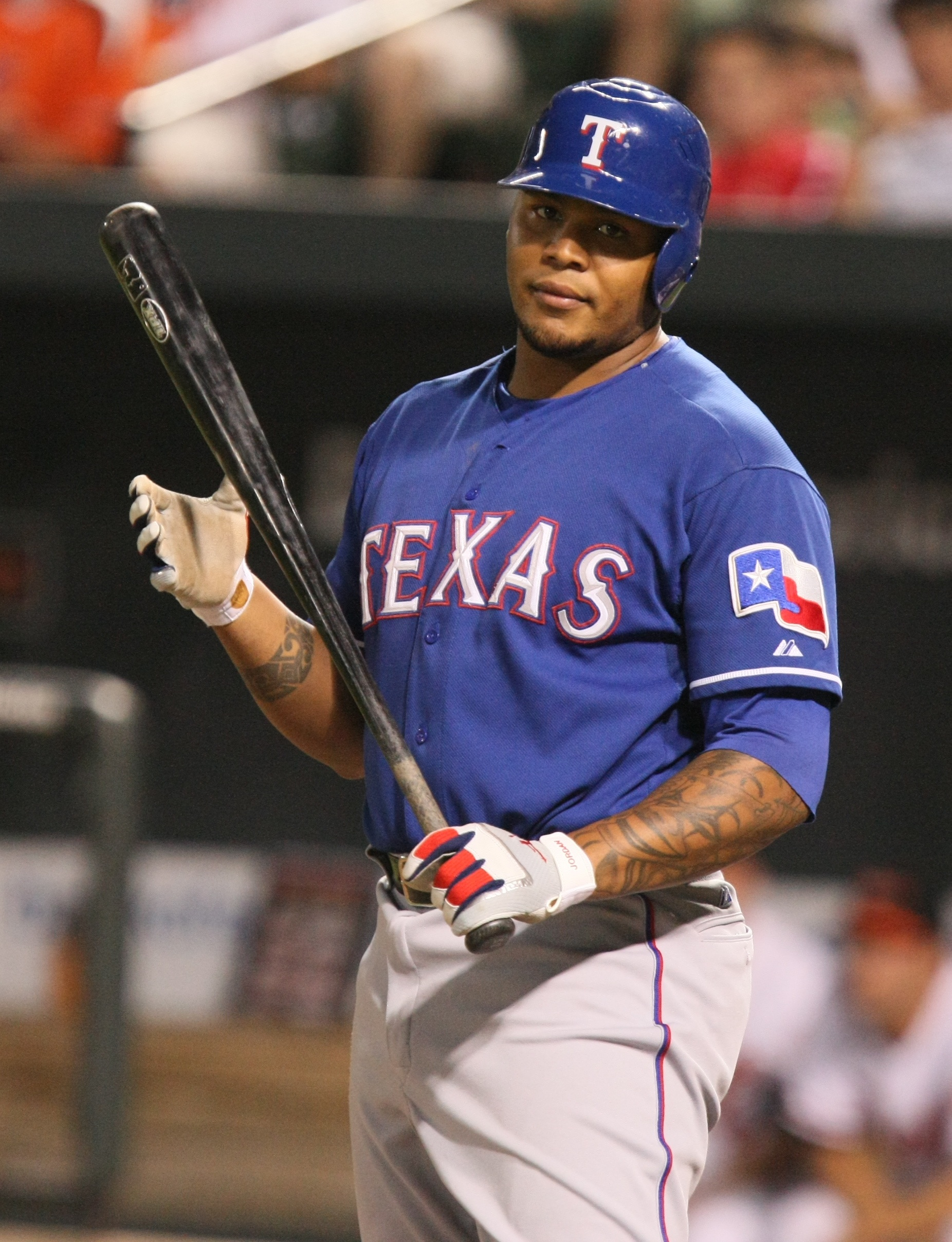
2002 National League All-Star Final Vote winner Andruw Jones was the first National League winner.

In 2002, the All-Star game rosters had 30 positions on each team so the fan voting was for the thirtieth roster spot. As a result, the official name of the contest was "The All-Star 30th Man". The voting lasted only two days and was held exclusively online through each of the 30 teams' official websites and ESPN.com. The voting for the July 9, 2002 Major League Baseball All-Star Game Final Vote started on June 30 and concluded on with the announcement of the results on July 2, 2002. Both winners, Johnny Damon and Andruw Jones played center field and recorded 3 official All-Star game at bats.

Player	Team	Position	Experience (All Star / Seasons)	Votes	Player	Team	Position	Experience (All Star / Seasons)	Votes
American League					National League				
Johnny Damon*	BOS	CF	(0/8)	692,989	Andruw Jones*	ATL	CF	(1/7)	559,752
Jim Thome	CLE	1B	(3/12)	666,825	Brian Giles	PIT	RF	(2/8)	488,725
Eric Chavez	OAK	3B	(0/5)	266,110	Larry Walker	COL	RF	(5/14)	297,174
Magglio Ordóñez	CHW	RF	(3/6)	179,951	Albert Pujols	STL	1B	(1/2)	267,196
Darin Erstad	ANA	CF	(2/7)	122,458	Ryan Klesko	SD	1B	(1/11)	138,824

=== 2003 candidates ===
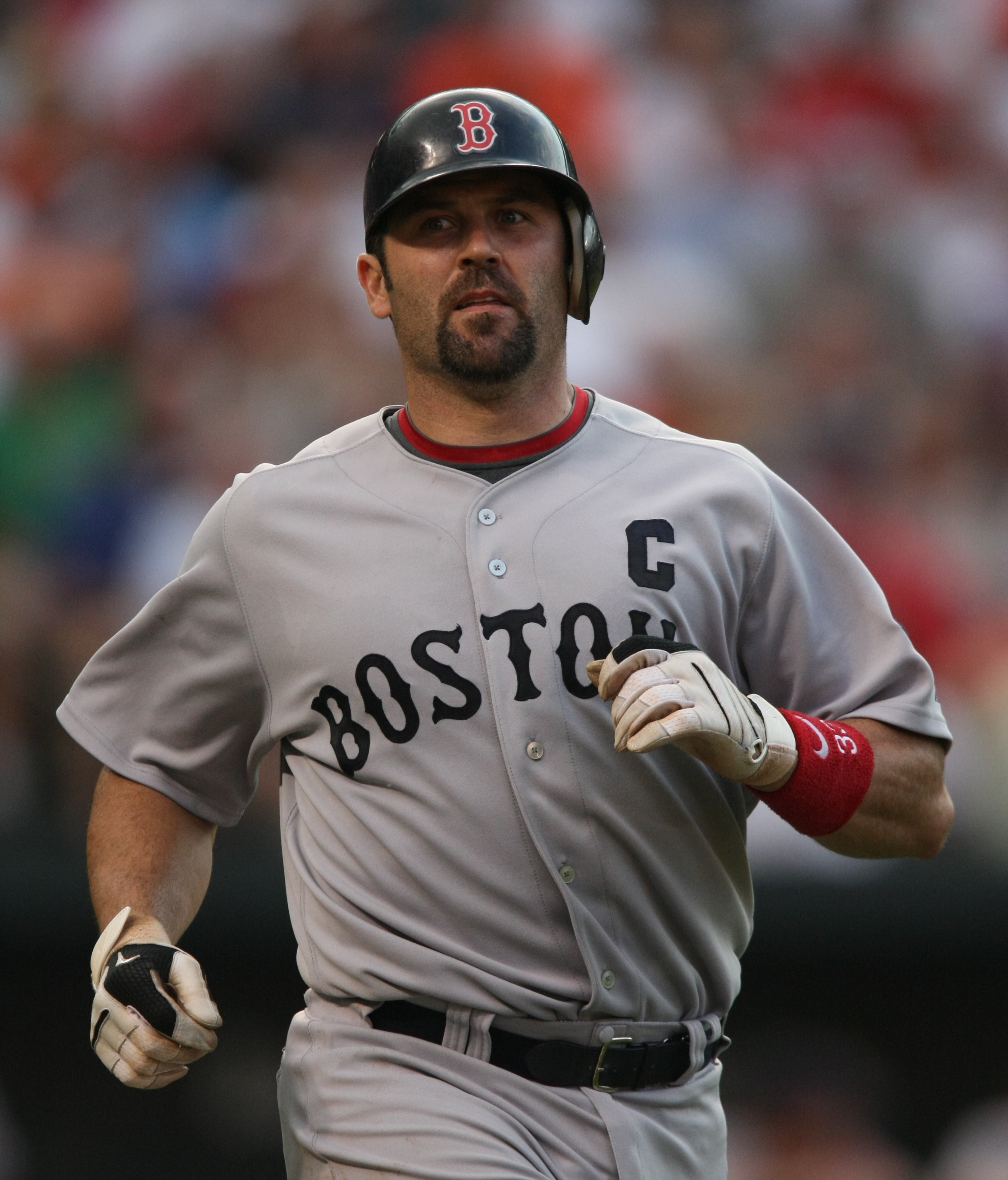
2003 American League All-Star Final Vote winner Jason Varitek gave the Boston Red Sox the first back-to-back All-Star Final Vote winners.

In 2003 the final vote had a named sponsor and the rosters expanded to 32 positions. In 2003, ballot substitution was instituted. On Monday July 7, 2003, Kenny Lofton was added to the ballot to replace the Chicago Cubs' Corey Patterson who was injured on the day before. The voting for the July 15, 2003 Major League Baseball All-Star Game Final Vote was extended to three days beginning Sunday, July 6, 2003, at 8 pm Eastern Time and ending on Wednesday, July 9, 2003, at 6 pm Eastern Time. Although the leading vote totals (Geoff Jenkins – 2,872,200, Jason Varitek – 3,210,509 of a total 10.8 million) were released in 2003 individual results were not released for all contestants. In fact, the American League did not even release the final ordinal vote ranking with the final results so only the last update ordinal vote ranking is shown below.

Neither Varitek nor Jenkins played, but both Giambi and Castillo batted as well as played in the field 2003 game as substitutes. Giambi replaced Mike Sweeney. Castillo was a last-minute addition to the team.

Player	Team	Position	Experience (All Star / Seasons)	Player	Team	Position	Experience (All Star / Seasons)
American League				National League			
Jason Varitek*	BOS	C	(0/7)	Geoff Jenkins*	MIL	LF	(0/6)
Frank Thomas	CHW	DH	(5/14)	Benito Santiago	SFG	C	(5/18)
Jason Giambi^	NYY	1B	(3/9)	Kenny Lofton	PIT	CF	(6/13)
Eric Byrnes	OAK	OF	(0/4)	Orlando Cabrera	MON	SS	(0/7)
Bengie Molina	ANA	C	(0/6)	Luis Castillo^	FLA	2B	(1/8)

=== 2004 candidates ===
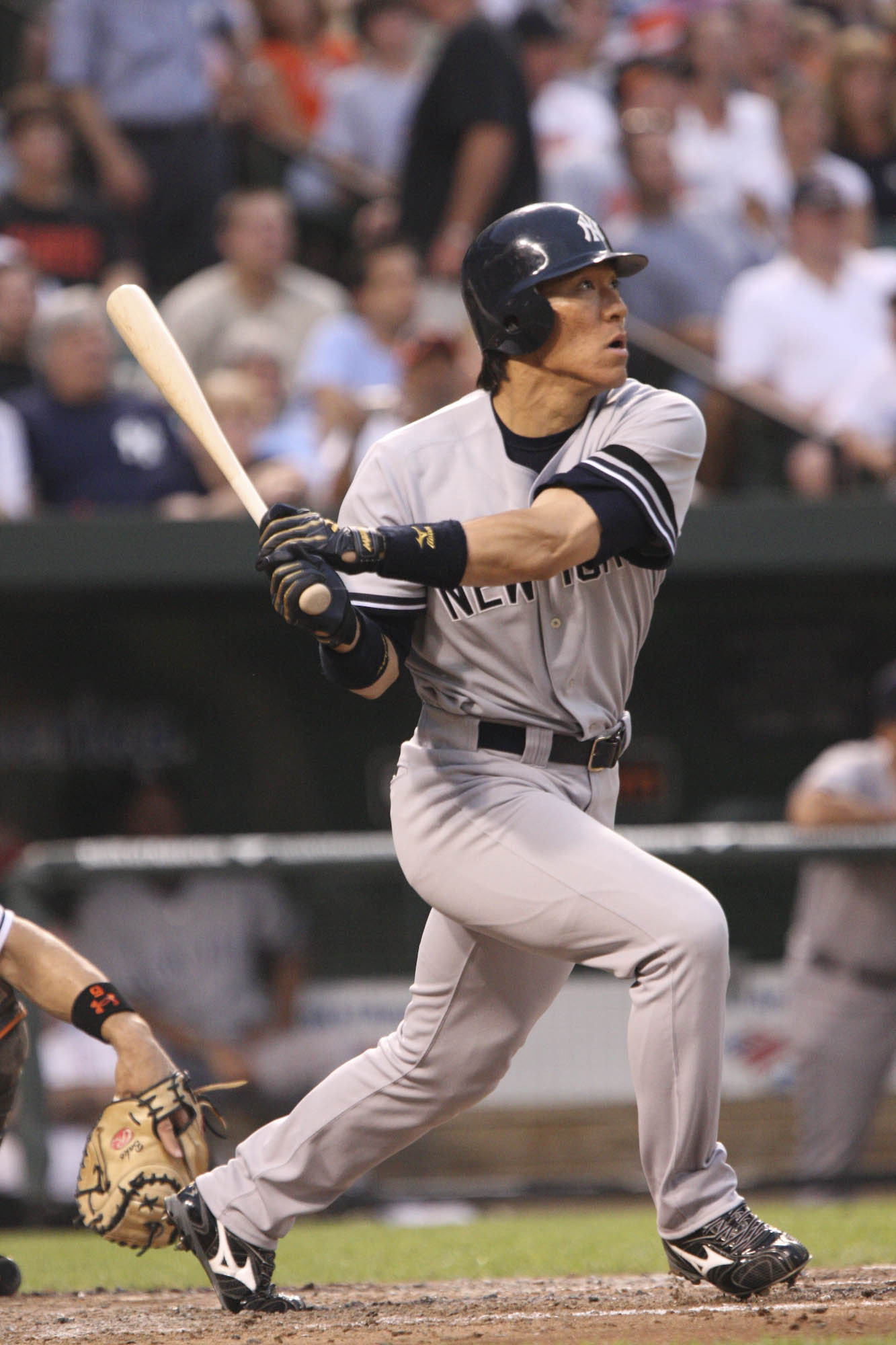
2004 American League All-Star Final Vote winner Hideki Matsui gave the All-Star Final Vote international prominence.

The voting for the 2004 Major League Baseball All-Star Game Final Vote again continued for three days, running from Sunday, July 4, 2004, and ending on Wednesday, July 7, 2004. The final results were announced with ordinal vote rankings (shown below) and approximate winning vote totals (Hideki Matsui – 1.2 million, Bobby Abreu – 2 million, of more than 9.5 million votes). Abreu appeared as a pinch hitter, while Matsui both pinch hit and played left field.

Player	Team	Position	Experience (All Star / Seasons)	Player	Team	Position	Experience (All Star / Seasons)
American League				National League			
Hideki Matsui*	NYY	LF	(1/2)	Bobby Abreu*	PHI	RF	(0/9)
Frank Thomas	CHW	DH	(5/15)	Aramis Ramírez	CHC	3B	(0/7)
Paul Konerko	CHW	1B	(1/8)	Steve Finley	ARZ	CF	(2/16)
Lew Ford	MIN	OF	(0/2)	Jason Kendall	PIT	C	(3/9)
Travis Hafner	CLE	DH	(0/3)	Juan Pierre	FLA	CF	(0/5)

=== 2005 candidates ===
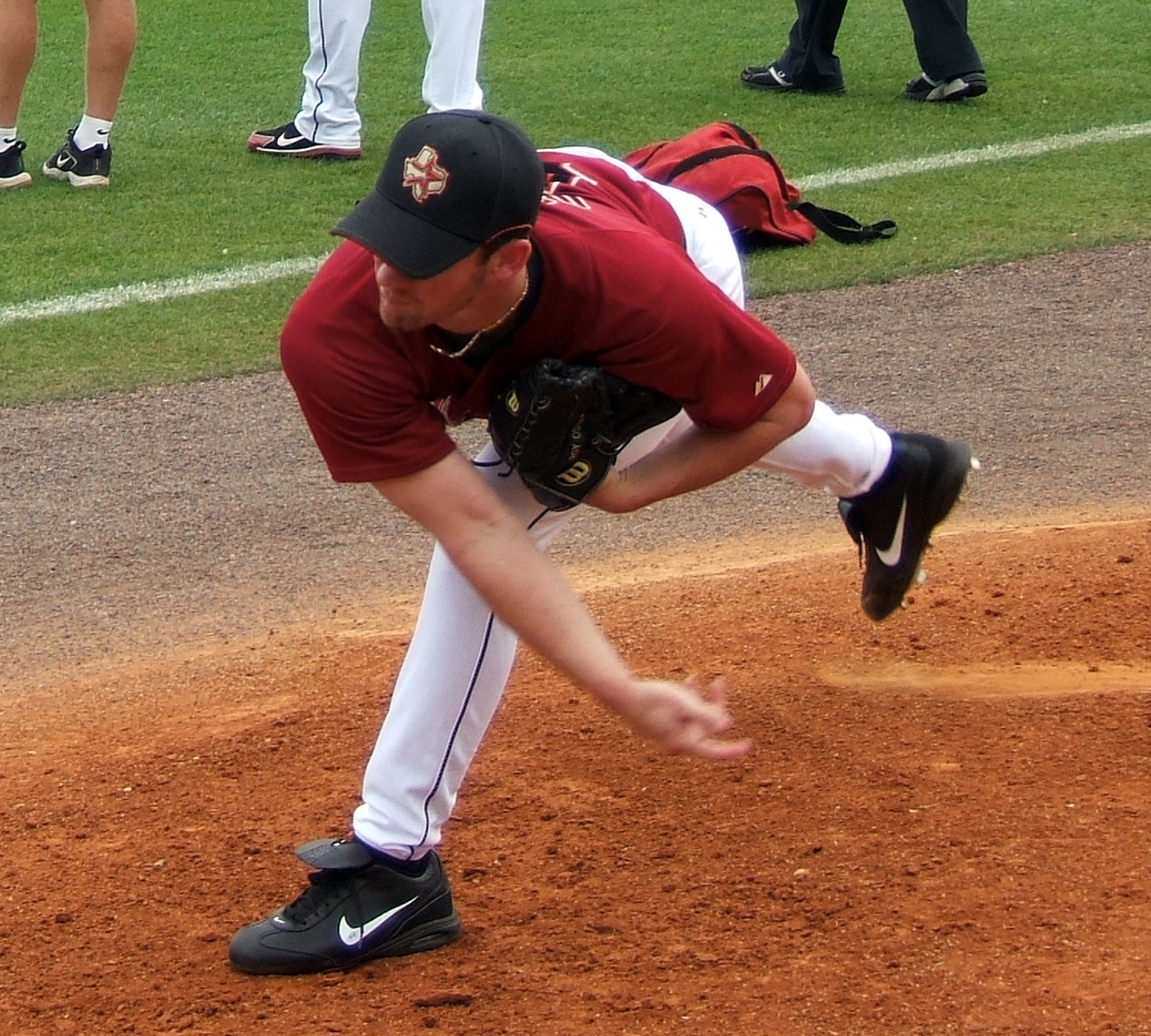
2005 National League All-Star Final Vote winner Roy Oswalt is among a select few to have been nominated for the All-Star Final Vote twice.

In 2005, the contest was again called the "Ameriquest All-Star Final Vote". The voting for the July 12, 2005 Major League Baseball All-Star Game Final Vote again continued for three days, running from Sunday, July 3, 2005, and ending on Wednesday, July 6, 2005. This marked the first time pitchers were nominated and the entire National League ballot was composed of pitchers. The American League ballot was composed of four outfielders and a shortstop. 2005 marked the first year that cell phone text message voting was possible. Derek Jeter and Roy Oswalt took the voting lead after Day 1. By Day 2, Scott Podsednik overtook Jeter and went on to win. Again, ordinal vote rankings (shown below) and winning vote totals (Podsednik – 3,965,473, Oswalt – 2,652,549 of 15 million votes) were revealed.

Wagner was named to the 2005 team as a replacement for Pedro Martínez but did not play. Both Oswalt and Podsednik played, but Podsednik did not record an official at bat.

Player	Team	Position	Experience (All Star / Seasons)	Player	Team	Position	Experience (All Star / Seasons)
American League				National League			
Scott Podsednik*	CHW	LF	(0/5)	Roy Oswalt*	HOU	SP	(0/5)
Derek Jeter	NYY	SS	(6/11)	Trevor Hoffman	SD	RP	(4/13)
Torii Hunter	MIN	CF	(1/9)	Brandon Webb	ARZ	SP	(0/3)
Hideki Matsui	NYY	LF	(2/3)	Billy Wagner^	PHI	RP	(3/11)
Carl Crawford	TB	LF	(1/4)	Brett Myers	PHI	SP	(0/4)

=== 2006 candidates ===
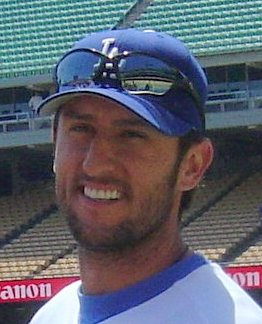
2006 National League All-Star Final Vote winner Nomar Garciaparra, a veteran All-Star at shortstop, won in 2006 as a first baseman.

In 2006, the contest was called the "Monster All-Star Final Vote". The voting for the July 11, 2006 Major League Baseball All-Star Game Final Vote again continued for three days, running from Sunday, July 2, 2006, and ending on Wednesday, July 5, 2006. Again, only the ordinal vote rankings (shown below) and the leading vote getter totals (Nomar Garciaparra – 4 million, A. J. Pierzynski – over 3.6 million of 18.6 million votes) were announced by Major League Baseball.

Liriano and Capuano were selected for the All-Star team as substitutes, but did not play. Liriano replaced José Contreras, and Capuano replaced Tom Glavine. Neither Garciaparra nor Pierzynski played.

Player	Team	Position	Experience (All Star / Seasons)	Player	Team	Position	Experience (All Star / Seasons)
American League				National League			
A. J. Pierzynski*	CHW	C	(1/9)	Nomar Garciaparra*	LAD	1B	(5/11)
Francisco Liriano^	MIN	SP	(0/2)	Chris Capuano^	MIL	SP	(0/4)
Travis Hafner	CLE	DH	(0/5)	Bobby Abreu	PHI	RF	(2/11)
Justin Verlander	DET	SP	(0/2)	Billy Wagner	NYM	RP	(4/12)
Ramón Hernández	BAL	C	(1/8)	Chris Young	SD	SP	(0/3)

=== 2007 candidates ===
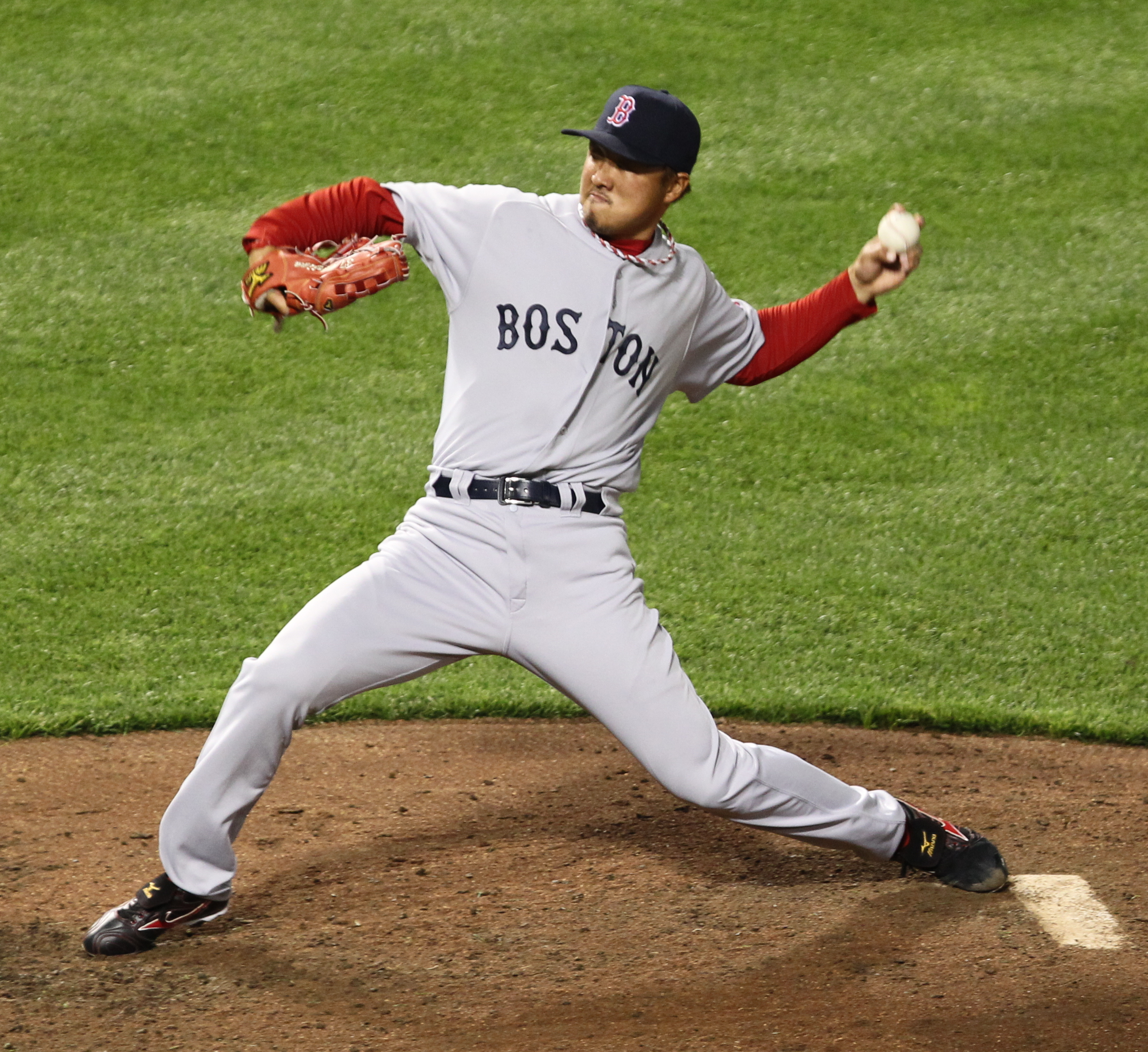
2007 American League All-Star Final Vote winner Hideki Okajima was a rookie and first time All-Star.

The 2007 "Monster All-Star Final Vote" included only pitchers (the National League included only starting pitchers). This is the 2nd time (2005) only pitchers were eligible for the final roster spot selection. The voting for the July 10, 2007 Major League Baseball All-Star Game Final Vote was the first four-day election, running from Sunday, July 1, 2007, and ending on Thursday, July 5, 2007. Voting leaders were announced daily. The ordinal vote rankings (shown below) and the leading vote getter totals (Young – over 4.5 million, Okajima – over 4.4 million of 23 million votes) were announced on the MLB.com results posting. Okajima (2–0, 0.88 ERA, & 4 saves in 38 relief appearances) and Young (8–3, 2.00 ERA, 99 K) are both first time all stars.

There was some controversy surrounding Roy Oswalt's nomination because he only had a 7–5 record at the time of nominations making him the only pitcher without eight wins nominated. However, he is considered by many to be the victim of lack of run support, questionable relief pitching and an average defense. This respect was shown by the players who had voted him to sixth place among National League starting pitchers making him the first alternate in case of injury to any of the five elected All-star starting pitchers. On the final day of All-Star Final Vote voting, it was announced that Oswalt (who was running third in the All-Star Final Vote) would replace John Smoltz who withdrew from All-Star game participation due to injury.

Brandon Webb of the Diamondbacks, the reigning NL Cy Young Award winner, replaced injured Colorado reliever Brian Fuentes. Neither Webb nor Oswalt played. Okajima did not play, but Young pitched 1 inning allowing a walk and a 2 run inside-the-park home run. As a result, he was the losing pitcher.

Player	Team	Position	Experience (All Star / Seasons)	Player	Team	Position	Experience (All Star / Seasons)
American League				National League			
Hideki Okajima*	BOS	RP	(0/1)	Chris Young*	SD	SP	(0/4)
Jeremy Bonderman	DET	SP	(0/5)	Carlos Zambrano	CHC	SP	(2/7)
Pat Neshek	MIN	RP	(0/2)	Roy Oswalt^	HOU	SP	(2/7)
Kelvim Escobar	LAA	SP	(0/11)	Brandon Webb^	ARZ	SP	(1/5)
Roy Halladay	TOR	SP	(4/10)	Tom Gorzelanny	PIT	SP	(0/3)

=== 2008 candidates ===
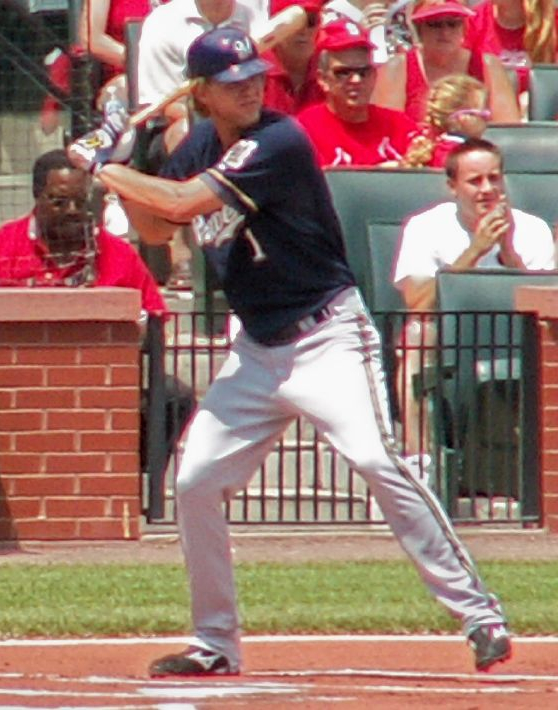
Corey Hart

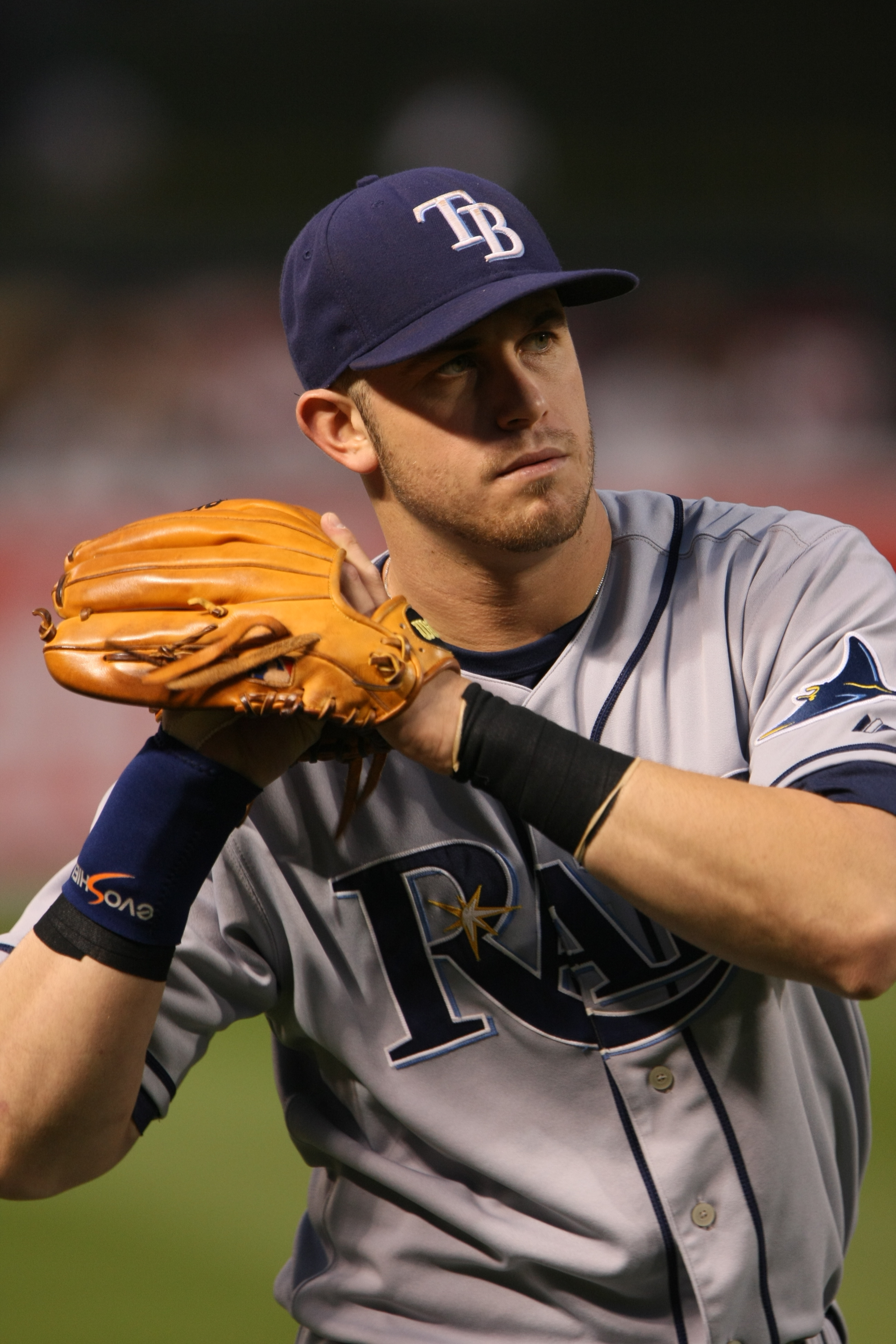
Evan Longoria

The 2008 "Monster All-Star Final Vote" included no pitchers. The voting for the July 15, 2008 Major League Baseball All-Star Game Final Vote began Sunday, July 6, 2008, and ended on Thursday, July 10, 2008. The ordinal vote rankings (shown below) and the leading vote-getter totals (Longoria – 9 million, Hart – 8 million of 47.8 million votes) were announced on the MLB.com results posting. Longoria and Hart were both first-time all stars.

Longoria drew a record nine million votes for his selection, over second-place finisher Jermaine Dye. Jason Giambi finished in third after a highly publicized "Support the 'Stache" campaign. Brian Roberts finished in fourth, followed by José Guillén. Hart accumulated eight million votes, the second highest vote total in the competition's history. Hart joined teammates outfielder Ryan Braun and pitcher Ben Sheets. Finishing in a close second was New York Mets third baseman David Wright, who eventually made the team as a replacement for injured Chicago Cubs outfielder Alfonso Soriano.

Longoria was the first third baseman and second rookie to win the Final Vote. Hart's victory marked the third time that a club had a winning representative more than once; Geoff Jenkins (also from the Milwaukee Brewers) was elected in 2003. The other two clubs to have achieved this are the Red Sox (Damon, Varitek and Okajima) and the White Sox (Podsednik and Pierzynski).

Player	Team	Position	Experience (All Star / Seasons)	Player	Team	Position	Experience (All Star / Seasons)
American League				National League			
Evan Longoria*	TB	3B	(0/1)	Corey Hart*	MIL	OF	(0/5)
Jermaine Dye	CHW	OF	(2/13)	David Wright^	NYM	3B	(3/5)
Jason Giambi	NYY	1B	(5/14)	Pat Burrell	PHI	OF	(0/9)
Brian Roberts	BAL	2B	(2/8)	Aaron Rowand	SF	OF	(1/8)
José Guillén	KC	OF	(0/12)	Carlos Lee	HOU	OF	(3/10)

=== 2009 candidates ===
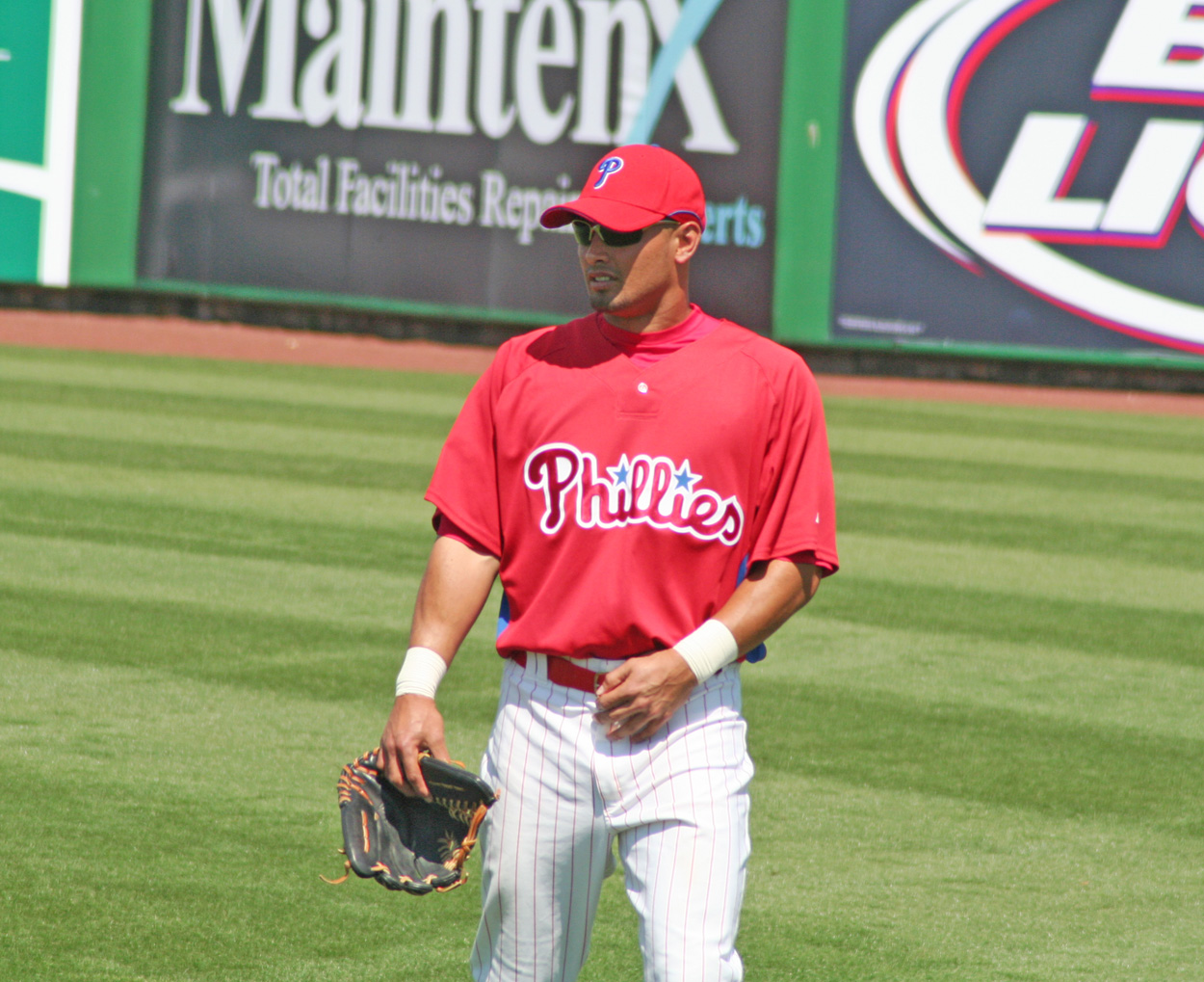
Shane Victorino

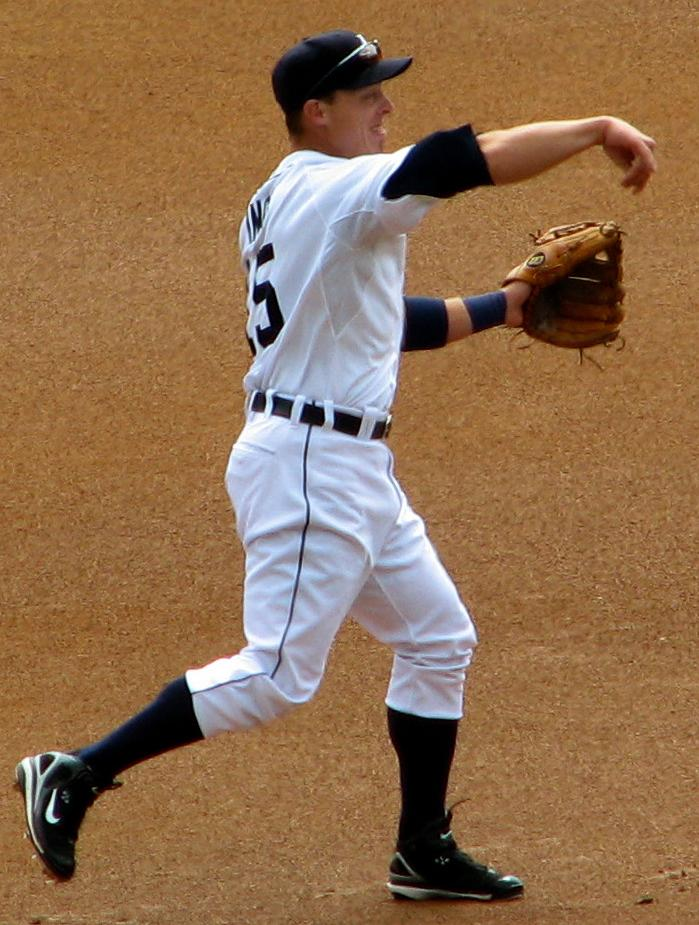
Brandon Inge

The 2009 "All-Star Game Sprint Final Vote" included no pitchers for the second consecutive year. The voting ran from Sunday, July 5 through Thursday, July 9. Eight of the selected players had never been an MLB All-Star. Washington Nationals shortstop Cristian Guzmán is a two-time All-Star, and Texas Rangers second baseman Ian Kinsler was an All-Star in 2008. In exchange for their sponsorship, text voting was available exclusively on Sprint capable mobile phones.

The Philadelphia Phillies and Detroit Tigers encouraged businesses in Michigan and Pennsylvania to allow their workers time off on Wednesday and Thursday to vote for both Inge and Victorino who were in second place in early voting. Victorino became the fourth Hawaiian (following pitchers Ron Darling, Sid Fernandez and Charlie Hough) to be selected to the Major League All-star game. This year's ballot, which is shown below in order of finish, was influenced by advertisements, online commercials, fliers, merchandise, official endorsements from people such as 2008 Republican presidential candidate John McCain, and contemporary technology such as Twitter.

Player	Team	Position	Experience (All Star / Seasons)	Player	Team	Position	Experience (All Star / Seasons)
American League				National League			
Brandon Inge*	DET	3B	(0/9)	Shane Victorino*	PHI	CF	(0/6)
Ian Kinsler	TEX	2B	(1/4)	Pablo Sandoval	SF	3B	(0/2)
Chone Figgins^	LAA	3B	(0/8)	Mark Reynolds	ARZ	3B	(0/3)
Carlos Peña^	TB	1B	(0/9)	Matt Kemp	LAD	CF	(0/4)
Adam Lind	TOR	DH/LF	(0/4)	Cristian Guzmán	WSH	SS	(2/10)

=== 2010 candidates ===
2010 Major League Baseball All-Star Game managers Joe Girardi of the American League and Charlie Manuel of the National League presented the 5-man ballots for the 2010 All-Star Game MLB.com Final Vote Sponsored by Sprint to determine the 34th player for each All-Star roster. Votto was named on 13.7 million of the 26 million ballots, followed by Zimmerman, Gonzalez and Wagner, in order. Swisher, who at the time was the most followed Twitter user, edged out Youkilis, in what was described as the closest race in the history of the All-Star Final Vote. Heath Bell was named substitute for Yovani Gallardo before the conclusion of the Final Vote and was removed from the ballot.

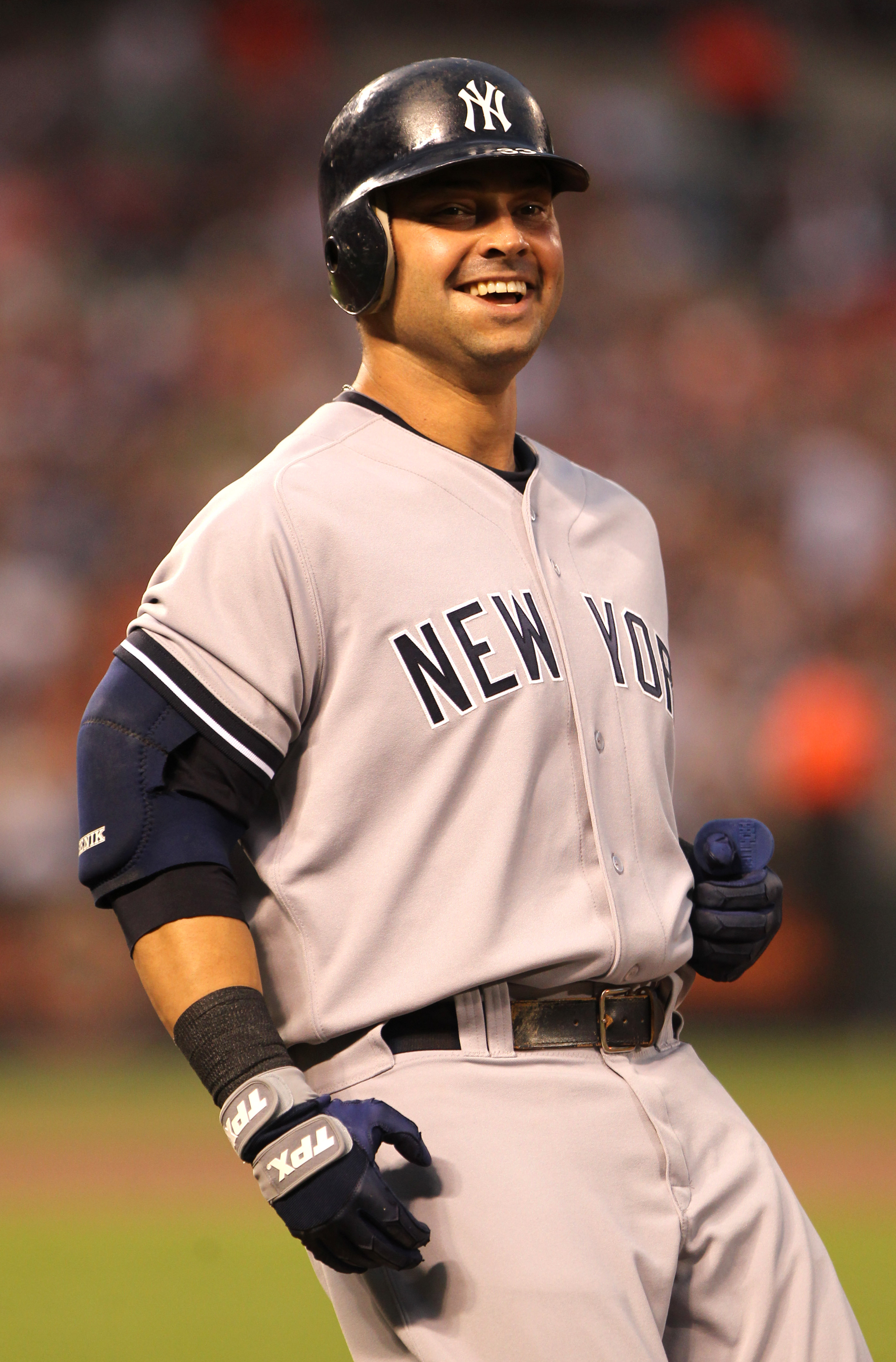
Nick Swisher

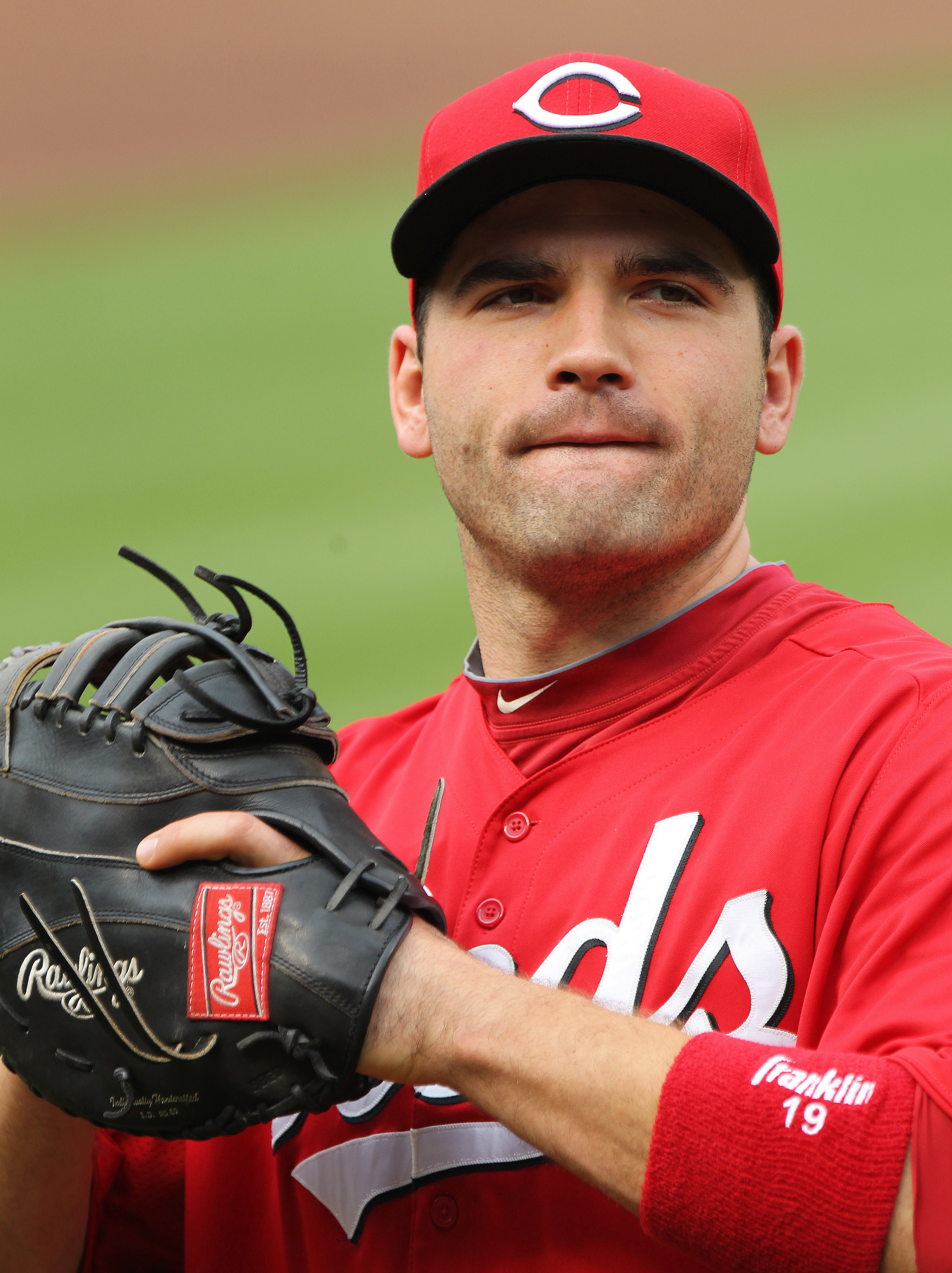
Joey Votto

Player	Team	Position	Experience (All Star / Seasons)	Player	Team	Position	Experience (All Star / Seasons)
American League				National League			
Nick Swisher*	NYY	RF	(0/7)	Joey Votto*	CIN	1B	(0/3)
Kevin Youkilis	BOS	1B	(2/7)	Ryan Zimmerman	WSH	3B	(1/5)
Michael Young	TEX	3B	(7/11)	Carlos Gonzalez	COL	OF	(0/3)
Paul Konerko^	CHW	1B	(3/13)	Billy Wagner^	ATL	RP	(6/15)
Delmon Young	MIN	LF	(0/4)	Heath Bell^	SD	RP	(1/6)

=== 2011 candidates ===
2011 Major League Baseball All-Star Game managers Ron Washington of the American League and Bruce Bochy of the National League presented the 5-man ballots for the 2011 All-Star Game Final Vote Sponsored by Sprint to determine the 34th player for each All-Star roster. Internet fans were able to vote at MLB.com and MLB team websites, while American and Canadian fans were also able to vote by text. Fans were encouraged to participate as campaign managers by generating votes via Twitter, Facebook and MLB.com websites for their choice. The fans elected Paul Konerko and Shane Victorino with 8.4 and 9.2 million votes of 50 million votes. Victorino was the first-two-time winner. MLB.com voters received special offers for discounts or free service.

Player	Team	Position	Experience (All Star / Seasons)	Player	Team	Position	Experience (All Star / Seasons)
American League				National League			
Paul Konerko*	CHW	1B	(4/14)	Shane Victorino*	PHI	OF	(1/8)
Victor Martinez	DET	C/DH	(4/9)	Andre Ethier^	LAD	OF	(1/6)
Alex Gordon	KC	OF	(0/5)	Todd Helton	COL	1B	(5/14)
Adam Jones	BAL	OF	(1/5)	Michael Morse	WSH	1B	(0/7)
Ben Zobrist	TB	2B	(1/5)	Ian Kennedy	ARZ	P	(0/4)

=== 2012 candidates ===
2012 Major League Baseball All-Star Game offered the fans 5-man ballots to express their opinions in the 2012 All-Star Game Final Vote Sponsored by Firestone to determine the 34th player for each All-Star roster. Internet fans were able to vote at MLB.com and MLB team websites, while American and Canadian fans were also able to vote by text. In the final few hours, fans were allowed to vote via Twitter for the first time by using specific hashtags, but Chipper Jones' name was removed since he had been named to the All-Star game as a replacement for the injured Matt Kemp. The four hours of Twitter voting brought about 2500 votes per minute. Over 50 million votes were cast in the Final vote in total.

Player	Team	Position	Experience (All Star / Seasons)	Player	Team	Position	Experience (All Star / Seasons)
American League				National League			
Yu Darvish*	TEX	P	(0/1)	David Freese*	STL	3B	(0/4)
Jonathan Broxton	KC	P	(2/7)	Michael Bourn^	ATL	OF	(1/6)
Ernesto Frieri	LAA	RP	(0/3)	Bryce Harper^	WSH	OF	(0/1)
Jason Hammel	BAL	P	(0/7)	Aaron Hill	ARZ	2B	(1/8)
Jake Peavy^	CWS	P	(3/10)	Chipper Jones^	ATL	3B	(7/19)

=== 2013 candidates ===
2013 Major League Baseball All-Star Game offered the fans 5-man ballots to express their opinions in the 2013 All-Star Game Final Vote to determine the 34th player for each All-Star roster. Internet fans were able to vote at MLB.com, MLB team websites and via text. In the final six hours, fans were allowed to vote via Twitter. The contest saw an unusual alliance in which Toronto Blue Jays and Atlanta Braves fans supported each other's nominees. This resulted in Toronto relief pitcher Steve Delabar and Atlanta first baseman Freddie Freeman winning the voting. Both Freeman and National League runner-up Yasiel Puig surpassed the 2009 15.6 million vote record, with Freeman totalling 19.7. The overall vote total of 79.2 million votes also surpassed the 2009 record (68.6 million).

Player	Team	Position	Experience (All Star / Seasons)	Player	Team	Position	Experience (All Star / Seasons)
American League				National League			
Steve Delabar*	TOR	P	(0/2)	Freddie Freeman*	ATL	1B	(0/4)
David Robertson	NYY	P	(1/6)	Ian Desmond	WSH	SS	(1/5)
Koji Uehara	BOS	P	(0/5)	Adrián González	LAD	1B	(4/10)
Tanner Scheppers	TEX	P	(0/1)	Hunter Pence	SF	OF	(2/7)
Joaquín Benoit	DET	P	(0/13)	Yasiel Puig	LAD	OF	(0/1)

=== 2014 candidates ===
Player	Team	Position	Experience (All Star / Seasons)	Player	Team	Position	Experience (All Star / Seasons)
American League				National League			
Chris Sale*	CHW	P	(2/4)	Anthony Rizzo*	CHC	1B	(0/3)
Garrett Richards	LAA	P	(0/3)	Justin Morneau	COL	1B	(4/11)
Rick Porcello	DET	P	(0/5)	Justin Upton	ATL	OF	(2/7)
Corey Kluber	CLE	P	(0/3)	Anthony Rendon	WAS	3B	(0/1)
Dallas Keuchel	HOU	P	(0/2)	Casey McGehee	MIA	3B	(0/5)

=== 2015 candidates ===
Player	Team	Position	Experience (All Star / Seasons)	Player	Team	Position	Experience (All Star / Seasons)
American League				National League			
Mike Moustakas*	KC	3B	(0/4)	Carlos Martinez*	STL	P	(0/2)
Xander Bogaerts	BOS	SS	(0/2)	Johnny Cueto	CIN	P	(1/7)
Yoenis Céspedes	DET	OF	(1/3)	Jeurys Familia	NYM	P	(0/3)
Brian Dozier^	MIN	2B	(0/3)	Clayton Kershaw^	LAD	P	(4/7)
Brett Gardner^	NYY	OF	(0/7)	Troy Tulowitzki^	COL	SS	(4/9)

=== 2016 candidates ===
Player	Team	Position	Experience (All Star / Seasons)	Player	Team	Position	Experience (All Star / Seasons)
American League				National League			
Michael Saunders*	TOR	OF	(0/8)	Brandon Belt*	SFG	1B	(0/6)
Ian Kinsler	DET	2B	(4/11)	Ryan Braun	MIL	OF	(6/10)
Evan Longoria	TB	3B	(3/9)	Jake Lamb	ARI	3B	(0/3)
Dustin Pedroia	BOS	2B	(4/11)	Starling Marte^	PIT	OF	(0/5)
George Springer	HOU	OF	(0/3)	Trevor Story	COL	SS	(0/1)

=== 2017 candidates ===
Player	Team	Position	Experience (All Star / Seasons)	Player	Team	Position	Experience (All Star / Seasons)
American League				National League			
Mike Moustakas*	KC	3B	(1/6)	Justin Turner*	LAD	3B	(0/8)
Elvis Andrus	TEX	SS	(2/8)	Justin Bour	MIA	1B	(0/3)
Xander Bogaerts	BOS	SS	(1/4)	Kris Bryant	CHC	3B	(2/2)
Didi Gregorius	NYY	SS	(0/5)	Anthony Rendon	WSH	3B	(0/4)
Logan Morrison	TAM	1B	(0/7)	Mark Reynolds	COL	1B	(0/10)

=== 2018 candidates ===
Player	Team	Position	Experience (All Star / Seasons)	Player	Team	Position	Experience (All Star / Seasons)
American League				National League			
Jean Segura*	SEA	SS	(2/7)	Jesus Aguilar*	MIL	1B	(1/5)
Andrew Benintendi	BOS	OF	(0/3)	Max Muncy	LAD	1B	(0/3)
Andrelton Simmons	LAA	SS	(0/7)	Matt Carpenter	STL	3B	(3/8)
Eddie Rosario	MIN	OF	(0/4)	Brandon Belt	SF	1B	(1/8)
Giancarlo Stanton	NYY	OF	(4/9)	Trea Turner	WAS	SS	(0/4)

== Nominees and winners by team ==
* – Includes replaced nominee
** – Was Anaheim Angels from 1997 to 2004.
*** – Was Florida Marlins from 1993 to 2011.
**** – Was Tampa Bay Devil Rays from 1998 to 2007.
***** – Was Montreal Expos from 1969 to 2004.

Team	Nominees	Winners	Winning Percentage
Arizona Diamondbacks	7	0	.000
Atlanta Braves	6	2	.333
Baltimore Orioles	4	0	.000
Boston Red Sox	7	3	.429
Chicago Cubs *	3	1	.333
Chicago White Sox	11	4	.364
Cincinnati Reds	2	1	.500
Cleveland Indians	4	0	.000
Colorado Rockies	6	0	.000
Detroit Tigers	8	1	.125
Houston Astros	5	1	.200
Kansas City Royals	4	1	.250
Los Angeles Angels of Anaheim **	6	0	.000
Los Angeles Dodgers	6	1	.167
Miami Marlins ***	3	0	.000
Milwaukee Brewers	4	2	.500
Minnesota Twins	6	0	.000
New York Mets	3	0	.000
New York Yankees	8	2	.250
Oakland Athletics	2	0	.000
Philadelphia Phillies	7	3	.429
Pittsburgh Pirates	5	0	.000
San Diego Padres	5	1	.200
San Francisco Giants	5	1	.200
Seattle Mariners	1	1	1.000
St. Louis Cardinals	3	2	.667
Tampa Bay Rays ****	5	1	.200
Texas Rangers	4	1	.250
Toronto Blue Jays	4	2	.500
Washington Nationals *****	7	0	.000

== See also ==
- Baseball awards § United States
