= Johnny Damon =

American baseball player (born 1973)

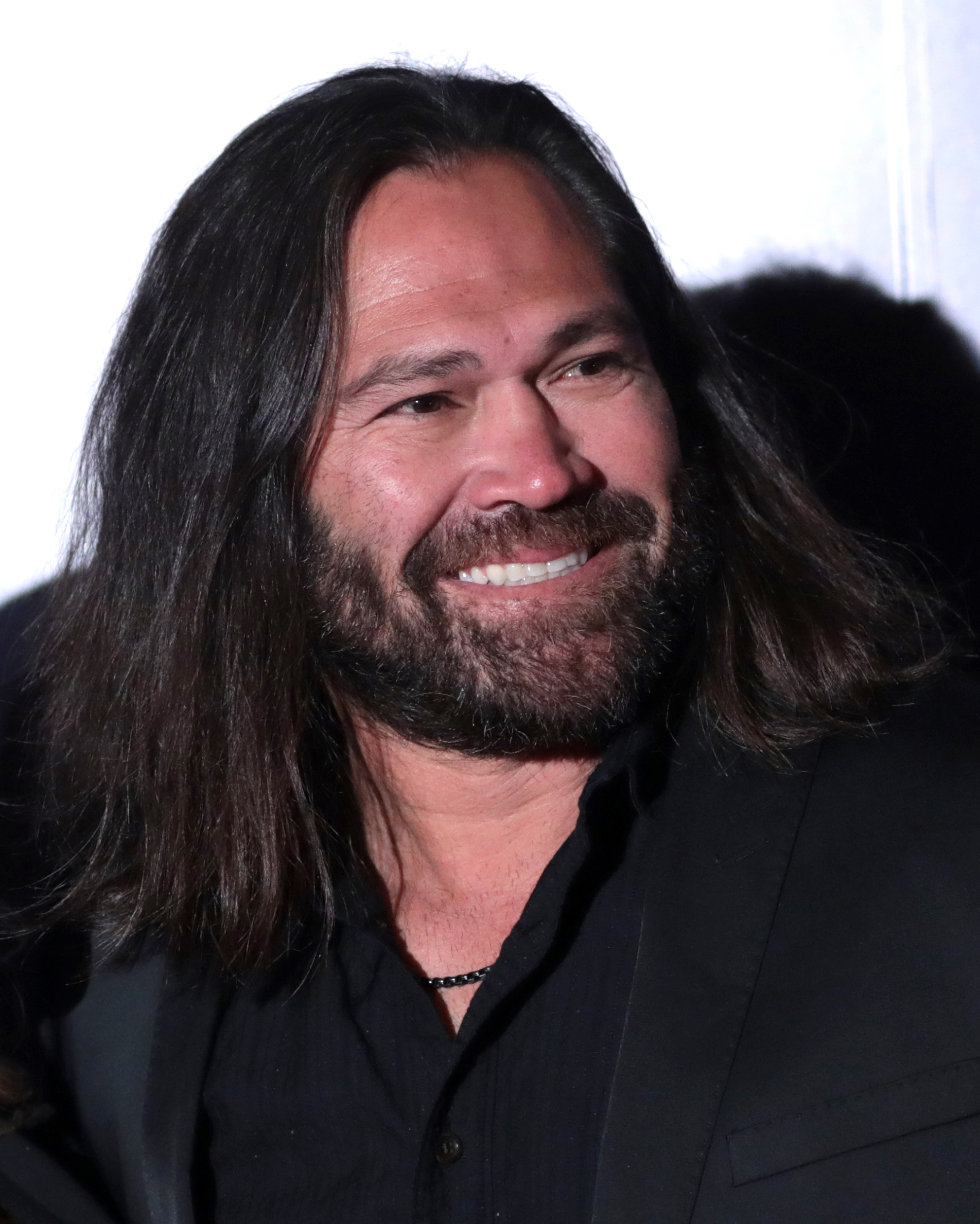
- Damon in 2023
- Outfielder
- Born: November 5, 1973 (age 53); Fort Riley, Kansas, U.S.
- Batted: Left Threw: Left

MLB debut
- August 12, 1995, for the Kansas City Royals

Last MLB appearance
- August 1, 2012, for the Cleveland Indians

MLB statistics
- Batting average: .284
- Hits: 2,769
- Home runs: 235
- Runs batted in: 1,139
- Stolen bases: 408
- Stats at Baseball Reference

Teams
- Kansas City Royals (1995–2000); Oakland Athletics (2001); Boston Red Sox (2002–2005); New York Yankees (2006–2009); Detroit Tigers (2010); Tampa Bay Rays (2011); Cleveland Indians (2012)

Career highlights and awards
- 2× All-Star (2002, 2005); 2× World Series champion (2004, 2009); AL stolen base leader (2000); Boston Red Sox Hall of Fame

Johnny David Damon (born November 5, 1973) is an American former professional baseball outfielder who played in Major League Baseball (MLB) from 1995 to 2012. During his MLB career, Damon played for the Kansas City Royals (1995–2000), Oakland Athletics (2001), Boston Red Sox (2002–2005), New York Yankees (2006–2009), Detroit Tigers (2010), Tampa Bay Rays (2011) and Cleveland Indians (2012). He also played for the Thailand national baseball team and was a member of the squad for the 2013 World Baseball Classic qualifiers.

== Early years ==
Damon was born in Fort Riley, a U.S. Army post in Kansas. His mother, Yome, is a Thai immigrant to the United States and his father, Jimmy, is an American of Croatian and Irish descent. They met while his father, a staff sergeant in the United States Army, was stationed in Thailand. Damon spent much of his infancy as an "Army brat," moving to several posts including Okinawa, Japan, and West Germany before his father was discharged from the Army. The Damon family settled in the Orlando, Florida, area while Johnny was a pre-schooler.

Damon was a quiet child, largely on account of a stutter. "My thoughts just raced ahead of my tongue," Damon said of his problem. "I'd sing songs as therapy, and I got better, but I still just kept quiet most of the time." He played in South Orange Little League as a child. He played for the Walker Jr. High baseball team before attending Dr. Phillips High School in Orlando where, during his senior year in 1992, he was rated the top high school prospect in the country by Baseball America, was named to USA Today's High School All-America team and was the Florida Gatorade Player of the Year. Damon also ran track at Dr. Phillips where his senior year he was runner up in the 200m dash. Damon also played football in high school, once getting hit by Warren Sapp and sustaining the first concussion in his life.

== Playing career ==
=== Kansas City Royals (1995–2000) ===
Damon was selected by the Kansas City Royals in the first round (35th overall) of the 1992 MLB draft. He made his MLB debut on August 12, 1995, after playing the previous season with the minor league Wichita Wranglers. He played for the Royals from 1995 to 2000. He scored 104 runs in 1998 and 101 runs in 1999. One of his best seasons came in 2000 when he led the American League in runs with 136 and stolen bases with 46, and he was second in hits (214), at bats (655), and plate appearances (741). Damon spent 5 and a half seasons with Kansas City, his longest tenure with one team.

=== Oakland Athletics (2001) ===
Damon spent 2001 with the Oakland Athletics. In a three-way trade involving the A's, Royals, and Tampa Bay Devil Rays, the A's received Damon along with pitcher Cory Lidle from the Devil Rays and second baseman Mark Ellis from the Royals. He was third in the league in at bats (644) and seventh in runs (108).

=== Boston Red Sox (2002–2005) ===
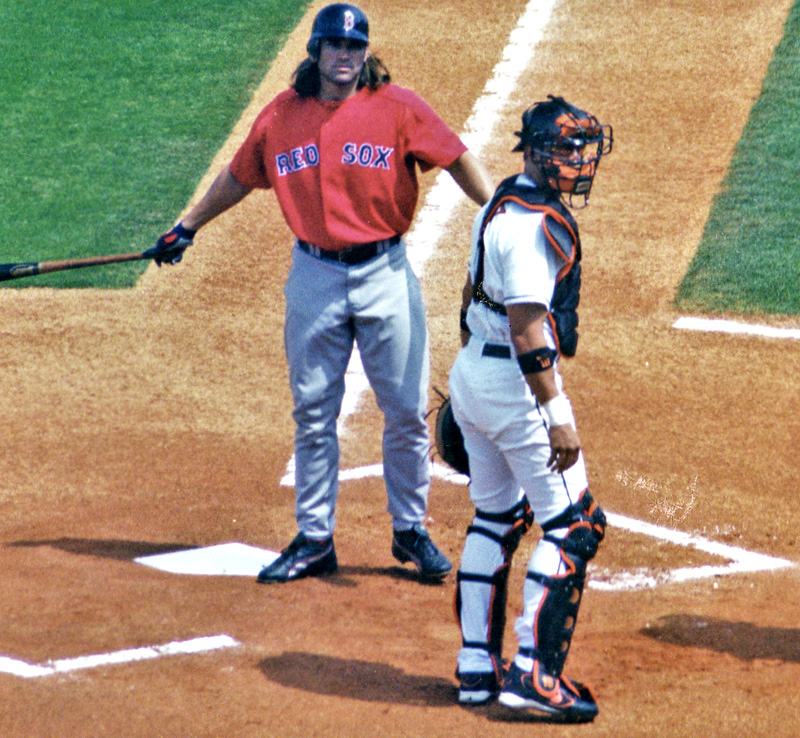
Damon at bat for the Red Sox in spring training 2005

On December 21, 2001, Damon signed a four-year, $31 million contract with the Boston Red Sox.

In 2002, he led the league in triples (11) and was third in infield hits (25), becoming the first player selected by the fans in the inaugural American League All-Star Final Vote.

On June 27, 2003, Damon became only the second player in MLB history since 1900 to record three base hits in an inning, when he did so against the Florida Marlins. During Game 5 of the 2003 American League Division Series, Damon collided head-on with teammate Damian Jackson while both players were attempting to chase down a pop fly. Damon suffered a severe concussion and had to be removed from the field on a stretcher. Jackson was also concussed, but was able to walk off the field with assistance.

In 2004, Damon was second in the league in runs (123) and began to re-establish himself among the premier lead-off hitters and center fielders in the game. In arguably his best season in the Major Leagues, Damon batted .304 with 20 home runs and 94 RBIs and showed improved patience at the plate. According to his autobiography, he was only the fourth leadoff batter in the history of Major League Baseball to drive in more than 90 runs in a season. Damon batted a torrid 7-for-15 during that year's Division Series against the Angels but struggled in the ALCS against the Yankees, going only 3-for-29 from the plate through the first six games. In Game 7, Damon hit two home runs, one of which was a grand slam, to lead the Red Sox to the pennant. In the World Series, he also hit a home run as the Red Sox won the series against the St. Louis Cardinals in a four-game sweep. This was the first Red Sox World Series championship since 1918, effectively terminating the Boston Red Sox's 86-year "Curse of the Bambino" World Series drought.

Through his four-year career with the Red Sox (2002–2005), Damon appeared in 597 games (590 in center field and seven as a designated hitter) and hit 56 home runs. Of his 2,476 at bats, 2,259 were as leadoff hitter. Damon batted second in the lineup for 156 at-bats in 2002, accounting for nearly all of the rest except for occasional pinch hit. He started two games as the third hitter in 2004, and in 2005, he had 624 at-bats, and all but three as the lead-off hitter. He also earned his second All-Star selection, starting as the American League's center fielder. He led the AL with 35 infield hits, and matched the 35 doubles he had hit in 2004.

=== New York Yankees (2006–2009) ===
On December 20, 2005, Damon signed a four-year, $52 million contract with the New York Yankees. The Red Sox stood firm on a three-year contract and chose not to negotiate against a five-year deal proposed by agent Scott Boras.

Damon's signing with the Yankees led to his being subsequently vilified by many Red Sox fans because of his previously professed loyalty to the city and Red Sox organization, including his now infamous statement in May 2005, where he claimed, "There's no way I can go play for the Yankees, but I know they're going to come after me hard. It's definitely not the most important thing to go out there for the top dollar, which the Yankees are going to offer me. It's not what I need."

As the Yankees had a strict dress code for players forbidding both long hair and facial hair beyond neat mustaches (the latter requirement being relaxed in 2025), Damon had his shoulder-length "cave man" hair cut and beard shaved on December 22. Damon, who had a clean-cut appearance until his third season with the Red Sox, had been planning on cutting his hair and shaving his beard off even if he did not sign with the Yankees, but waited until after he signed with them in order to prevent speculation.

The following season, in a pivotal five game series in August between the Yankees and Red Sox at Fenway Park, Damon went 3-for-6 in each of the first three games, including a doubleheader on August 18, and a game on August 19. Damon hit two home runs, drove in eight runs, and scored eight runs in the first three games as the Yankees won by a combined score of 39–20 and dealt a severe blow to the Red Sox 2006 playoff aspirations.

In 2006, Damon finished third in runs (115) and ninth in stolen bases (25) in the AL, while hitting 24 home runs, his career high. He also tied his mark of 35 doubles from the previous two seasons. He was only one of 4 players in the major leagues to hit at least 24 home runs and steal at least 24 bases.

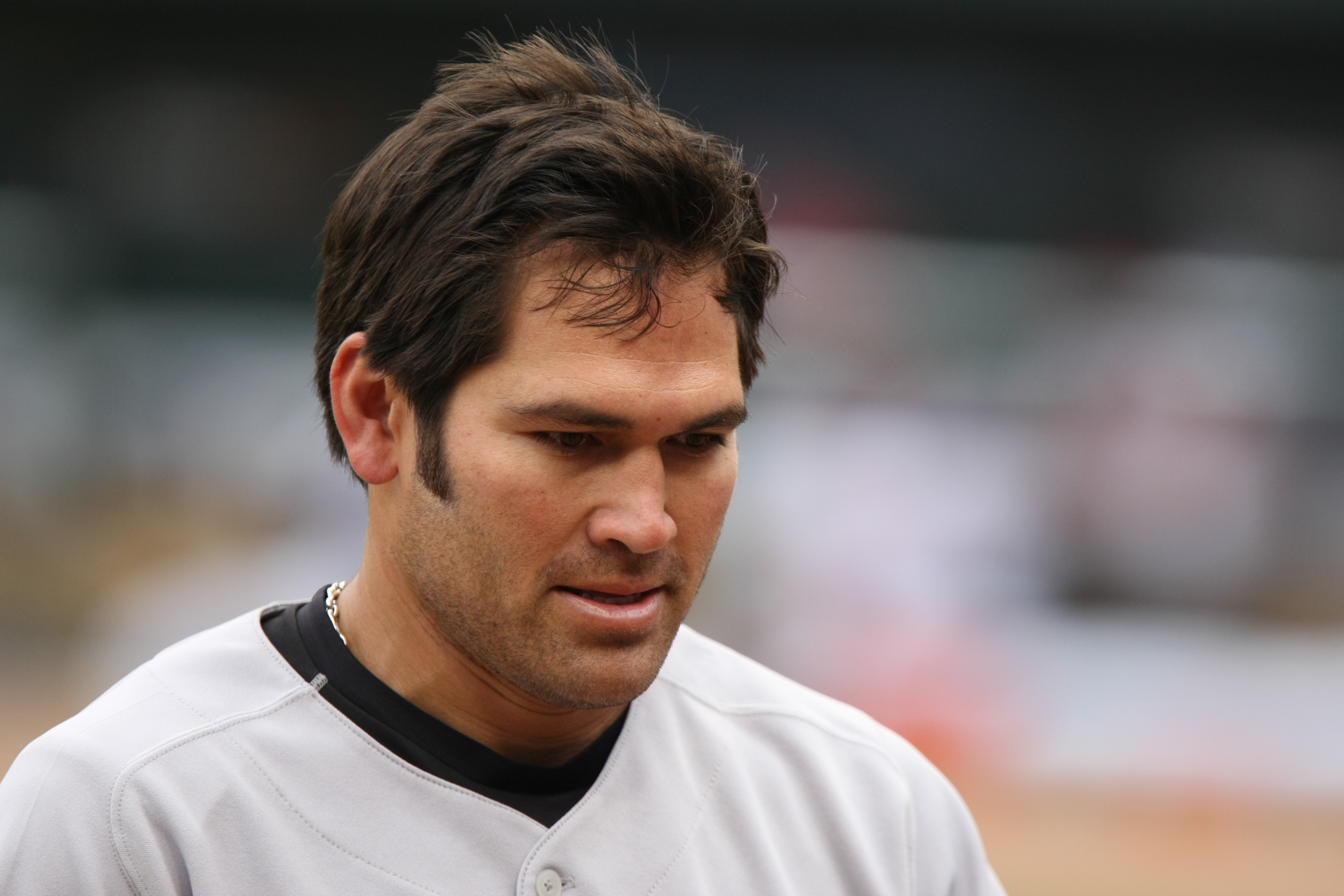
Damon with the Yankees in 2008

On June 7, 2008, Damon went 6-for-6 in the Yankees 12–11 win over the Kansas City Royals, including a walk-off ground-rule double, which had bounced over the wall. He is the first Yankee to have six hits in a 9 inning game since Myril Hoag accomplished the feat in 1934. Damon said in a post-game on-field interview that this was his first walk-off as a Yankee.

The Yankees placed Damon on the 15-day disabled list for the first time in his MLB career on July 6, 2008, with a bruised AC joint in his left shoulder. The injury occurred a day earlier when Damon collided with the outfield wall in an attempt to catch a triple. At that time, Damon was one of only three active major league ballplayers who had played at least 10 years in the majors without going on the disabled list. He returned to active duty, and hit 27 doubles for the season. Damon hit 53 home runs in his three complete seasons with the Yankees.

On July 27, 2009, Damon hit his 200th career home run against the Tampa Bay Rays' Brian Shouse. For the 2009 season, he batted .282 and tied for the lead among AL left fielders in errors (with 5), while he was fourth in the league in runs scored (107).

Damon hit a home run in Games 3 and 4 of the 2009 ALCS, defeating the Los Angeles Angels of Anaheim in six games. When the Yankees went on to play the Philadelphia Phillies in the 2009 World Series, Damon got credit for stealing two bases in one play when the Phillies defense was shifted against batter Mark Teixeira. Damon got his second championship ring as the Yankees would eventually defeat the Phillies in six games.

Damon, after winning his second World Series, entered free agency after the 2009 season despite expressing his desire to return to the Yankees. He insisted that the Yankees not even make him an offer, however, unless they pay him at least the $13 million he earned for the past four years. As a result of his contract demands, the Yankees signed 1B/DH Nick Johnson to a one-year/5.5MM deal, despite Damon lowering his salary demands at the last minute. The Yankees then signed outfielder Randy Winn to a one-year $2 million deal which essentially closed the door on Damon's return to the Bronx.

=== Detroit Tigers (2010) ===
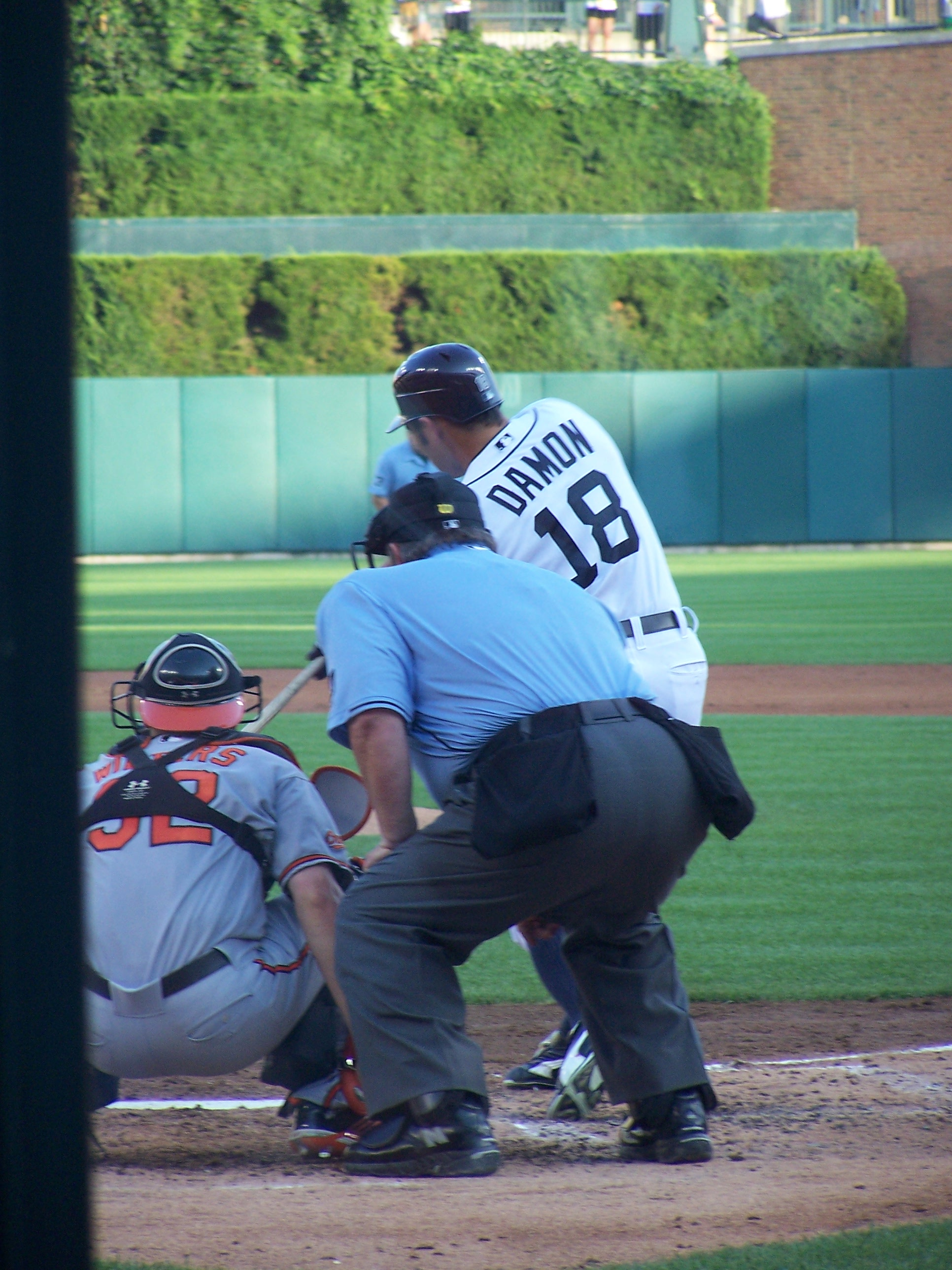
Damon batting for the Detroit Tigers in 2010

On February 20, 2010, Damon agreed to a one-year, $8 million deal with the Detroit Tigers. On April 14, 2010, he recorded his 1,000th career RBI against the Kansas City Royals. On May 1, he hit a walk-off home run against Los Angeles Angels of Anaheim pitcher Scot Shields at Comerica Park to win the game 3–2. On July 6, Damon recorded his 2,500th career hit off Jake Arrieta of the Baltimore Orioles, and hit a walk-off home run off David Hernandez, giving the Tigers a 7–5 win. For the season, he batted .271 with eight home runs and 51 RBI. He became a free agent at the end of the season.

=== Tampa Bay Rays (2011) ===
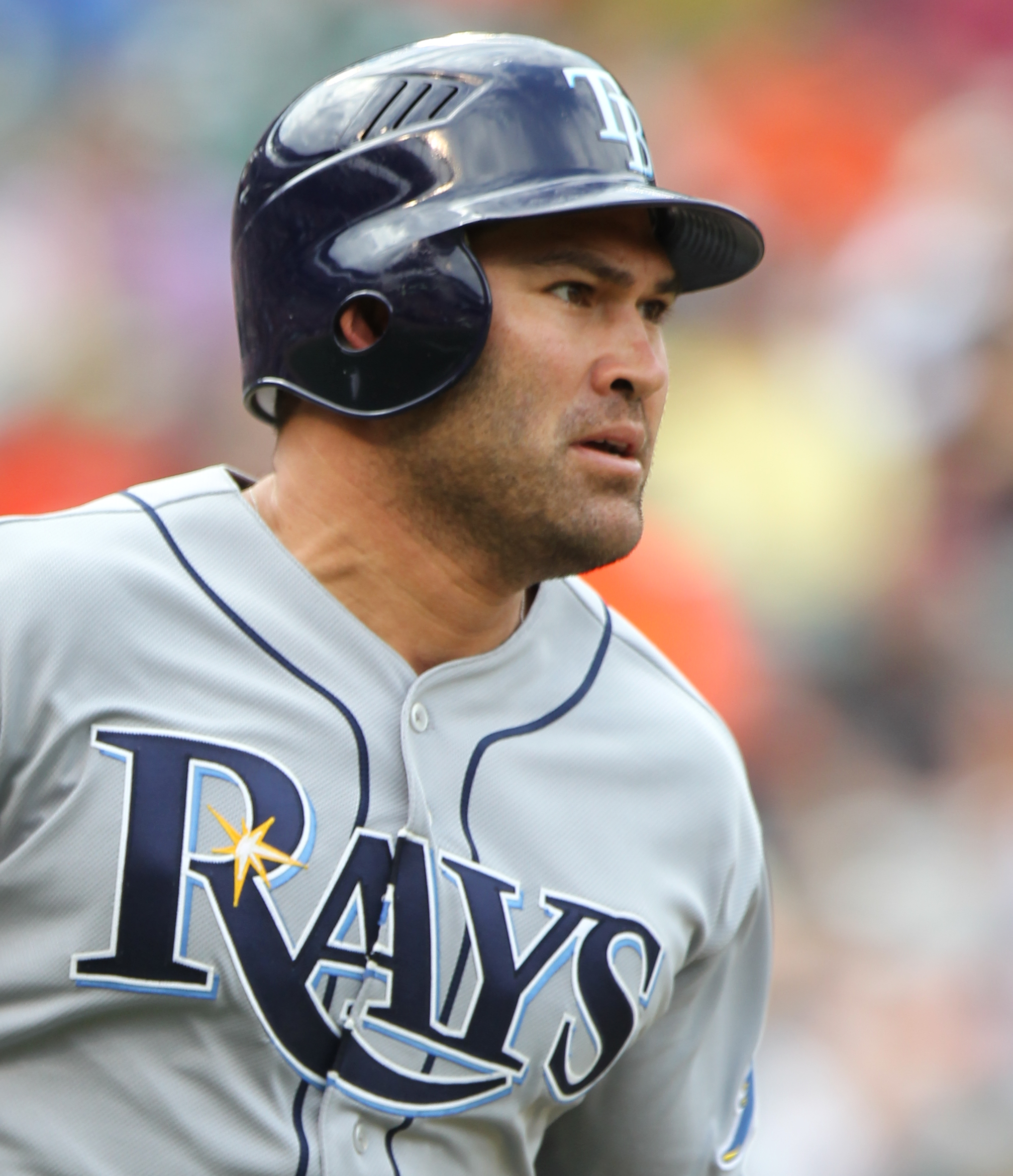
Damon during his tenure with the Rays in 2011

On January 21, 2011, Damon agreed to a one-year, $5.25 million deal with the Tampa Bay Rays. The Rays also signed his former Boston Red Sox teammate Manny Ramirez in a package deal suggested by agent Scott Boras. Also reunited with Damon was former Red Sox player Kelly Shoppach.

Manager Joe Maddon said he expected the 37-year-old Damon to often be replaced by Sam Fuld during the season late in games that the Rays are leading. After Ramirez's abrupt retirement, this would be moot as Damon primarily would play as the designated hitter.

On April 16, 2011, Damon had the game-winning hit for the fifth consecutive game for the Rays, two of which were walk-off hits. On June 29, 2011, Damon tied Ted Williams for 71st on the all-time hit list with 2,654 hits. The hit came at Tropicana Field in the bottom of the sixth inning. On July 2, 2011, Damon went 4-for-4 and his first-inning single moved him past Ted Williams on the all-time hit list. He would finish the season 57th all-time with 2,723 career hits.

In Game 1 of the ALDS, Damon hit a two-run home run in the second inning off Texas Rangers starting pitcher C. J. Wilson to give his team an early 2–0 lead. The Rays won the game 9–0, however they eventually lost the best-of-five divisional series 3–1.

=== Cleveland Indians (2012) ===
On April 12, 2012, Damon signed a one-year minor league contract with the Cleveland Indians for $1.25 million (and an additional $1.4 million in incentives). On May 1, Damon was called up to Cleveland. He made his debut on May 2, batting leadoff against the Chicago White Sox. He finished the game 0–3 with a walk. Indians manager Manny Acta dropped Damon to seventh in the batting lineup after going 4–29 in the leadoff position, including 2 hits in his last 18 at-bats. On June 26, in a game against the Yankees, Damon became the 52nd player in MLB history to amass 2,750 career hits. Heading into the All-Star break, Damon had 35 hits in 163 official at-bats and was hitting .215 in 50 games. On July 20, Damon tied a season-high with three hits versus the Baltimore Orioles.

Damon was designated for assignment on August 3, 2012. He was released by the Indians, along with pitchers Derek Lowe and Jeremy Accardo, on August 9.

Damon finished his career with 2,769 hits, placing him 54th on the MLB all-time career hits leaders.

His first year of eligibility for the National Baseball Hall of Fame and Museum came in 2018 where he joined a notable group of first-time candidates, including Chipper Jones, Jim Thome and Omar Vizquel. Damon only received eight votes (1.9% of the voting ballot) and was thus dropped from future consideration.

=== Free agency (2013–2015) ===
Damon hoped to be signed for 2013, and offered the Yankees the opportunity to sign him to a contract for the league's minimum salary as a replacement for the injured Curtis Granderson, also expressing a willingness to be released once Granderson returned. The Yankees indicated that they were not interested in signing Damon. Damon remained unsigned for all of 2013, and did not play.

In late 2013 and early 2014, Damon indicated a desire to keep playing, in part to have the opportunity to attain 3,000 hits (he needed 231 to reach that goal). He told members of the media that he has stayed in good physical condition and hoped to receive invitations to spring training.

Damon did not receive any offers prior to the start of the 2014 season. In a May 2014 interview while in Boston to celebrate the 10th anniversary of the Red Sox 2004 World Series championship, Damon indicated that he has no plans to officially announce his retirement, even though he acknowledged that he will likely not play in the major leagues again. He also stated that he still wants to play, has continued to stay in good physical condition, and could play if given the opportunity, saying "I feel like if a team calls me, I can be ready. If I play tonight, I'll hit a homer." On June 22, 2014, he played in his first New York Yankees Old-Timers' Day.

A July 2014 press report indicated that Damon still hoped to play again in the major leagues. According to the story, in June Damon completed an impromptu session with a batting practice pitcher for the Philadelphia Phillies, who was impressed enough to suggest that the Phillies should consider signing him.

On August 4, 2014, Damon gave an interview with the WEEI-FM radio show "Middays with MFB" and indicated that while he wants to still play, no teams have expressed an interest, and "those days are over".

According to press accounts in December 2014, Damon hoped to play in 2015, and his agent told a reporter "If you ask Johnny, he'd love to come back."

== Awards ==
- 1993 – Midwest League All-Star OF
- 1994 – Carolina League All-Star Royals Minor League Player of the Year
- 1995 – Baseball America 1st team Minor League All-Star, KC Royals Minor League Player of the Year, Texas League All-Star & Most Valuable Player, AA All-Star, and AA Player of the Year
- 2000 – KC Royals Player of the Year
- 2002 – All-Star (Inaugural AL All-Star Final Vote winner)
- 2005 – Baseball America 2nd-Team All-Star, AL All-Star
- 2009 – TYIB Award: Best Postseason Moment
- 2017 – Asian American Hall of Fame
- 2020 – International Sports Hall of Fame.

== Other appearances ==
In 2005, Damon wrote Idiot: Beating "The Curse" and Enjoying the Game of Life with Peter Golenbock.

Damon contributed backing vocals to Dropkick Murphys' 2004 single "Tessie."

Damon hosted WWE Raw on December 21, 2009.

Damon participated in the Celebrity Apprentice competition in the spring of 2014 in New York City. The shows that he filmed were part of the 2015 season of the show. He was eliminated from the show on the episode which aired on February 2, 2015.

Damon appeared on the Animal Planet show Tanked in 2016.

Damon appeared on MTV Cribs in 2005, where he gave a tour of his home near Orlando, Florida.

In April 2018, Damon was announced as one of the celebrities who will compete on season 26 of Dancing with the Stars. He was partnered with professional dancer Emma Slater. He was eliminated on the first episode, and he placed in ninth place.

In August 2019, Damon and his wife appeared as one set of primary charter guests during seasons 4 & 5 of the show Below Deck Mediterranean. They returned to the show again in June 2026 during season 11.

On February 22, 2023, Damon played in an exhibition game with the Savannah Bananas, in a game of Banana Ball against the Party Animals at Jackie Robinson Ballpark in Daytona Beach, Florida.

== Personal life ==
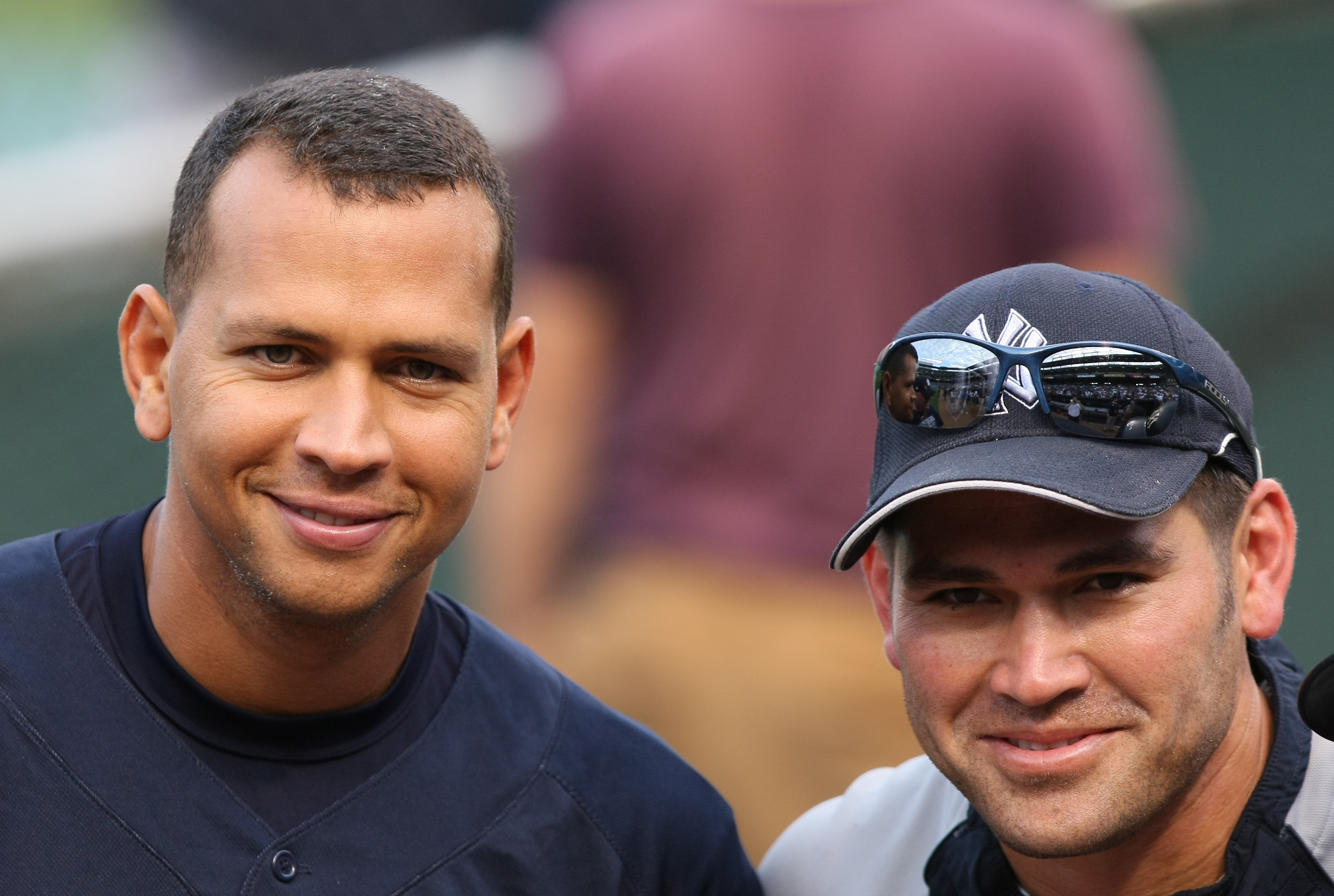
Alex Rodriguez and Damon

Damon has had two marriages and has fathered eight children. Damon married Angela Vannice, his high school sweetheart in 1992, and later divorced in 2002. The couple had a set of twins (a son and a daughter) together in 1999.

Damon married Michelle Mangan in 2004. The couple have six children together; five daughters (including a set of twins) and a son.

Damon and his family reside in Windermere, Florida. While with the Yankees, Damon and his wife lived in Cresskill, New Jersey.

He is active with the Wounded Warrior Project, which works to raise awareness and enlist the public's aid for the needs of severely injured service men and women.

Damon was one of the victims of the $8 billion fraud perpetrated by convicted wealth manager Allen Stanford.

Damon spoke at a rally in Florida during Donald Trump's 2016 presidential campaign and chanted in support of a border wall between the United States and Mexico. Damon formerly served as a committee member on Trump's council on Sports, Fitness, & Nutrition.

On October 26, 2019, in Orlando, Florida, Damon was the Special Guest at the Orange County Republican Party's Trump Defender Gala and 2019 Annual Lincoln Day Dinner.

On February 19, 2021, Damon was arrested in Windermere, Florida, for driving while intoxicated (DWI) and for resisting an officer without violence. Police reported that he had a blood alcohol content (BAC) of .30, measured two hours after he was stopped by police. Bodycam footage released by the Windermere Police Department showed Damon claiming that his arrest was part of being targeted because of his support for Trump.

In November, 2025, Damon was announced as a limited ownership partner for the Lowell Spinners.

== See also ==
- Top 300 home run hitters of all time
- List of Major League Baseball career hits leaders
- List of Major League Baseball career doubles leaders
- List of Major League Baseball career runs scored leaders
- List of Major League Baseball career stolen bases leaders
- List of Major League Baseball career total bases leaders
- List of Major League Baseball annual runs scored leaders
- List of Major League Baseball annual stolen base leaders
- List of Major League Baseball annual triples leaders
- List of Major League Baseball single-game hits leaders

Preceded by Albert Belle	American League Player of the Month; July 2000	Succeeded by Glenallen Hill
