= 2018 Major League Baseball All-Star Game =

2018 American baseball competition

	1	2	3	4	5	6	7	8	9	10	R	H	E
American League	0	1	1	0	0	0	0	3	0	3	8	13	0
National League	0	0	1	0	0	0	1	1	2	1	6	7	1
- Date: July 17, 2018
- Venue: Nationals Park
- City: Washington, D.C.
- Managers: A. J. Hinch (HOU); Dave Roberts (LAD)
- MVP: Alex Bregman (HOU)
- Attendance: 43,843
- Ceremonial first pitch: James McCloughan
- Television: Fox (United States); MLB International (International)
- TV announcers: Joe Buck, John Smoltz, Ken Rosenthal and Tom Verducci (Fox); Dan Shulman and Buck Martinez (MLB International)
- Radio: ESPN
- Radio announcers: Jon Sciambi and Chris Singleton

The 2018 Major League Baseball All-Star Game was the 89th Major League Baseball All-Star Game. The game was hosted by the Washington Nationals and was played at Nationals Park on July 17, 2018. It was televised nationally by Fox. The American League beat the National League 8–6, in 10 innings.

The host city was announced on April 6, 2015, by Major League Baseball Commissioner Rob Manfred; it was the fifth All-Star Game in Washington, D.C., and the first since 1969, when the second Washington Senators hosted. It was also the first time that the Nationals had hosted the All-Star Game, and the first time that the Nationals franchise had hosted it since 1982, when the franchise played as the Montreal Expos. For the second straight year, the Houston Astros led both the American League and all of baseball in sending six All-Stars to the game.

The two leagues came into the game with identical 43–43–2 records and both had scored exactly 361 runs each in All-Star Game history. The game also broke a home run record, as ten home runs were hit in the game; the previous record being six. All but one run was scored by way of a home run. This is the second consecutive game the AL has won in the 10th inning.

The national rating for the game was 5.2, down from 6.5 in 2017.

== Fan balloting ==
=== Starters ===
Balloting began on June 1 and ended on July 5. As in previous games, the top vote-getters at each position will be the selected starters for their respective positions, barring any suspensions, injuries or other issues. The reserve players are picked in a more convoluted way involving fan votes, players, and Commissioner's Office. For the fourth year, voting was conducted online exclusively. The results were announced on July 8.

=== Final roster spot ===
After the rosters were finalized, a second ballot of five players per league was created for the All-Star Final Vote to determine the 32nd and final player of each roster. The online balloting was conducted from July 8 through July 11. The winners of the All-Star Final Vote were Jean Segura of the American League's Seattle Mariners and Jesús Aguilar of the National League's Milwaukee Brewers.

National League
Player	Team	Pos.
Jesús Aguilar	Brewers	1B
Brandon Belt	Giants	1B
Matt Carpenter	Cardinals	3B
Max Muncy	Dodgers	1B
Trea Turner	Nationals	SS

American League
Player	Team	Pos.
Andrew Benintendi	Red Sox	OF
Eddie Rosario	Twins	OF
Jean Segura	Mariners	SS
Andrelton Simmons	Angels	SS
Giancarlo Stanton	Yankees	OF

== Rosters ==
=== National League ===
Elected starters
Position	Player	Team	All-Star Games
C	Willson Contreras	Cubs	1
1B	Freddie Freeman	Braves	3
2B	Javier Báez	Cubs	1
3B	Nolan Arenado	Rockies	4
SS	Brandon Crawford	Giants	2
OF	Nick Markakis	Braves	1
OF	Matt Kemp	Dodgers	3
OF	Bryce Harper	Nationals	6

Reserves
Position	Player	Team	All-Star Games
C	Yadier Molina^{[B]}	Cardinals	9
C	Buster Posey^{#}	Giants	6
C	J. T. Realmuto	Marlins	1
1B	Jesús Aguilar	Brewers	1
1B	Paul Goldschmidt	Diamondbacks	6
1B	Joey Votto	Reds	6
2B	Ozzie Albies	Braves	1
2B	Scooter Gennett	Reds	1
3B	Eugenio Suárez	Reds	1
SS	Trevor Story	Rockies	1
OF	Charlie Blackmon	Rockies	3
OF	Lorenzo Cain	Brewers	2
OF	Christian Yelich	Brewers	1

Pitchers
Player	Team	All-Star Games
Patrick Corbin	Diamondbacks	2
Jacob deGrom	Mets	2
Sean Doolittle^{#}	Nationals	2
Mike Foltynewicz	Braves	1
Zack Greinke^{[E]}	Diamondbacks	5
Josh Hader	Brewers	1
Brad Hand	Padres	2
Kenley Jansen	Dodgers	3
Jeremy Jeffress^{[F]}	Brewers	1
Jon Lester^{#}	Cubs	5
Miles Mikolas^{#}	Cardinals	1
Aaron Nola	Phillies	1
Max Scherzer	Nationals	6
Ross Stripling^{[D]}	Dodgers	1
Felipe Vázquez	Pirates	1

=== American League ===
Elected starters
Position	Player	Team	All-Star Games
C	Wilson Ramos^{#}	Rays	2
1B	José Abreu	White Sox	2
2B	Jose Altuve	Astros	6
3B	José Ramírez	Indians	2
SS	Manny Machado	Orioles	4
OF	Mookie Betts	Red Sox	3
OF	Mike Trout	Angels	7
OF	Aaron Judge	Yankees	2
DH	J. D. Martinez	Red Sox	2

Reserves
Position	Player	Team	All-Star Games
C	Salvador Pérez^{[I]}	Royals	6
C	Yan Gomes^{[J]}	Indians	1
1B	Mitch Moreland	Red Sox	1
2B	Jed Lowrie^{[C]}	Athletics	1
2B	Gleyber Torres^{#}	Yankees	1
3B	Alex Bregman	Astros	1
SS	Francisco Lindor	Indians	3
SS	Jean Segura	Mariners	2
OF	Michael Brantley	Indians	3
OF	Shin-Soo Choo	Rangers	1
OF	Mitch Haniger	Mariners	1
OF	George Springer	Astros	2
DH	Nelson Cruz	Mariners	6

Pitchers
Player	Team	All-Star Games
Trevor Bauer^{[A]}	Indians	1
José Berríos	Twins	1
Aroldis Chapman^{#}	Yankees	5
Gerrit Cole	Astros	2
Edwin Díaz	Mariners	1
J. A. Happ	Blue Jays	1
Joe Jiménez	Tigers	1
Craig Kimbrel	Red Sox	7
Corey Kluber^{#}	Indians	3
Charlie Morton^{[H]}	Astros	1
Chris Sale	Red Sox	7
Luis Severino	Yankees	2
Blake Snell^{[G]}	Rays	1
Blake Treinen	Athletics	1
Justin Verlander^{#}	Astros	7

==== Roster notes ====
1. Trevor Bauer was named as the roster replacement for Justin Verlander due to Verlander starting on Sunday.
2. Yadier Molina was named as the roster replacement for Buster Posey due to injury.
3. Jed Lowrie was named as the roster replacement for Gleyber Torres due to injury.
4. Ross Stripling was named as the roster replacement for Miles Mikolas due to Mikolas starting on Sunday.
5. Zack Greinke was named as the roster replacement for Jon Lester due to Lester starting on Sunday.
6. Jeremy Jeffress was named as the roster replacement for Sean Doolittle due to injury.
7. Blake Snell was named as the roster replacement for Corey Kluber due to injury.
8. Charlie Morton was named as the roster replacement for Aroldis Chapman due to injury.
9. Salvador Pérez was named starter in place of Wilson Ramos due to injury.
10. Yan Gomes was named as the roster replacement for Wilson Ramos due to injury.

#: Indicates player would not play (replaced as per reference notes above).

== Game summary ==
=== Starting lineup ===
National
Order	Player	Team	Position
1	Javier Báez	Cubs	2B
2	Nolan Arenado	Rockies	3B
3	Paul Goldschmidt	Diamondbacks	DH
4	Freddie Freeman	Braves	1B
5	Matt Kemp	Dodgers	LF
6	Bryce Harper	Nationals	CF
7	Nick Markakis	Braves	RF
8	Brandon Crawford	Giants	SS
9	Willson Contreras	Cubs	C
	Max Scherzer	Nationals	P

American
Order	Player	Team	Position
1	Mookie Betts	Red Sox	RF
2	Jose Altuve	Astros	2B
3	Mike Trout	Angels	CF
4	J. D. Martinez	Red Sox	DH
5	José Ramírez	Indians	3B
6	Aaron Judge	Yankees	LF
7	Manny Machado	Orioles	SS
8	José Abreu	White Sox	1B
9	Salvador Pérez	Royals	C
	Chris Sale	Red Sox	P

=== Line score ===
Tuesday, July 17, 2018 8:23 pm (EDT) Nationals Park in Washington, D. C., 82 °F (28 °C), partly cloudy
Team	1	2	3	4	5	6	7	8	9	10	R	H	E
American League	0	1	1	0	0	0	0	3	0	3	8	13	0
National League	0	0	1	0	0	0	1	1	2	1	6	7	1
Starting pitchers: AL: Chris Sale; NL: Max Scherzer; WP: Edwin Díaz (1–0) LP: Ross Stripling (0–1) Sv: J. A. Happ (1); Home runs: AL: Aaron Judge (1), Mike Trout (1), Jean Segura (1), Alex Bregman (1), George Springer (1); NL: Willson Contreras (1), Trevor Story (1), Christian Yelich (1), Scooter Gennett (1), Joey Votto (1); Attendance: 43,843. Time: 3:34. Umpires: HP – Ted Barrett (crew chief); 1B – Jim Reynolds; 2B – Alfonso Márquez; 3B – Andy Fletcher; LF – Mike Muchlinski; RF – Cory Blaser; Replay Official – Marvin Hudson; Boxscore

== See also ==
- List of Major League Baseball All-Star Games
- Major League Baseball All-Star Game Most Valuable Player Award
- All-Star Futures Game
- Home Run Derby
