= Jesús Aguilar =

Venezuelan baseball player (born 1990)

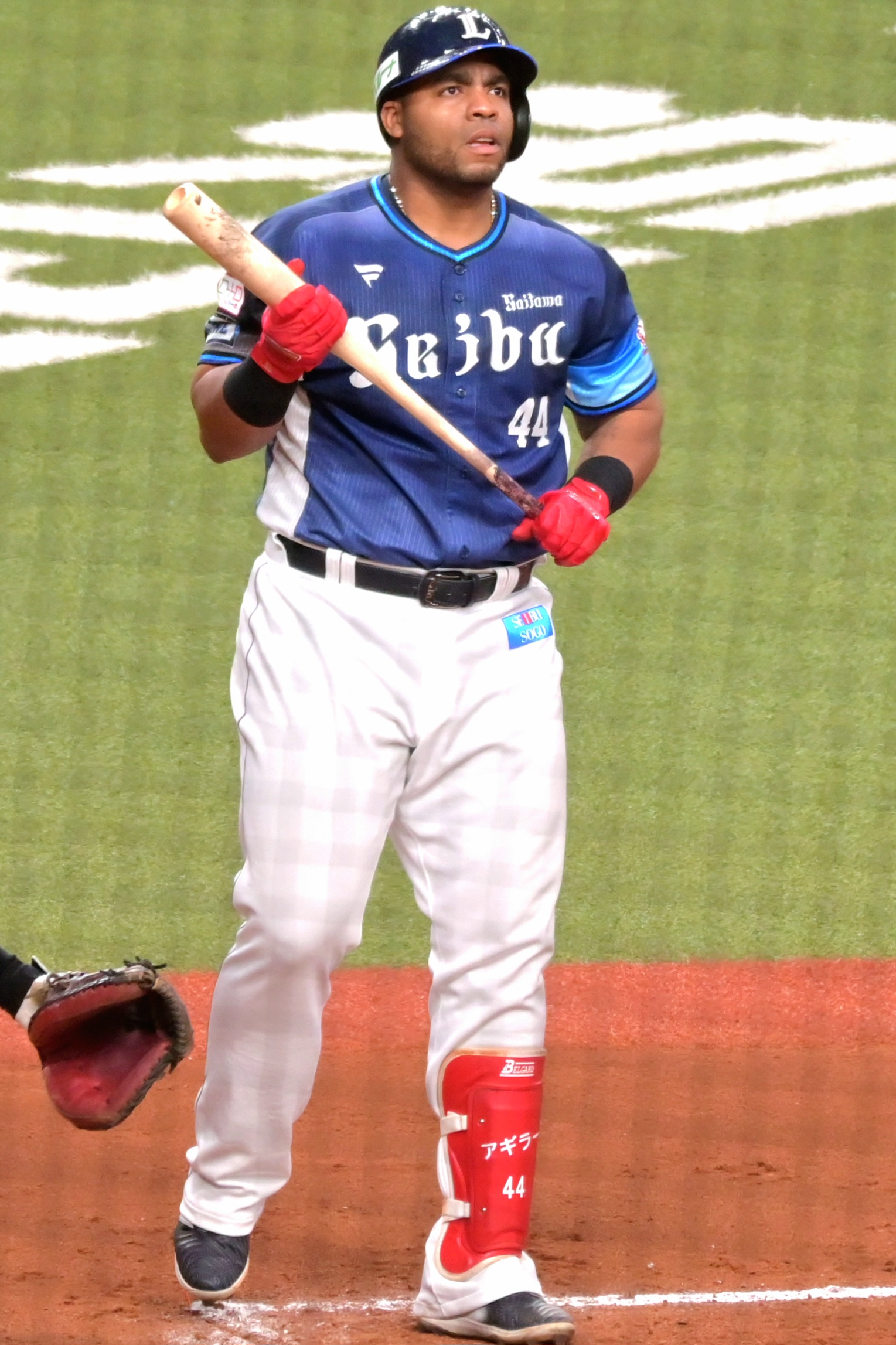
- Aguilar with the Saitama Seibu Lions in 2024
- First baseman
- Born: June 30, 1990 (age 36); Maracay, Venezuela
- Batted: Right Threw: Right

Professional debut
- MLB: May 15, 2014, for the Cleveland Indians
- NPB: March 29, 2024, for the Saitama Seibu Lions

Last appearance
- MLB: May 27, 2023, for the Oakland Athletics
- NPB: May 8, 2024, for the Saitama Seibu Lions

MLB statistics
- Batting average: .253
- Home runs: 114
- Runs batted in: 402

NPB statistics
- Batting average: .204
- Home runs: 2
- Runs batted in: 10
- Stats at Baseball Reference

Teams
- Cleveland Indians (2014–2016); Milwaukee Brewers (2017–2019); Tampa Bay Rays (2019); Miami Marlins (2020–2022); Baltimore Orioles (2022); Oakland Athletics (2023); Saitama Seibu Lions (2024)

Career highlights and awards
- All-Star (2018)

Jesús Alexander Aguilar (born June 30, 1990) is a Venezuelan former professional baseball first baseman. He played in Major League Baseball (MLB) for the Cleveland Indians, Milwaukee Brewers, Tampa Bay Rays, Miami Marlins, Baltimore Orioles, and Oakland Athletics, and in Nippon Professional Baseball (NPB) for the Saitama Seibu Lions. Aguilar was an All-Star in 2018.

== Career ==
=== Cleveland Indians ===
Aguilar signed with the Cleveland Indians as an amateur free agent in November 2007. He spent his first two seasons with the Dominican Summer League Indians. After splitting 2010 between two minor league teams, he hit 23 home runs during the 2011 season between the Lake County Captains of the Single–A Midwest League and the Kinston Indians of the High–A Carolina League. In 2011, Aguilar was also on the Carolina Mudcats roster, then an affiliate of the Cleveland Indians. Aguilar and Francisco Lindor represented the Indians in the 2012 All-Star Futures Game. The Indians invited Aguilar to spring training in 2013 as a non-roster invitee.

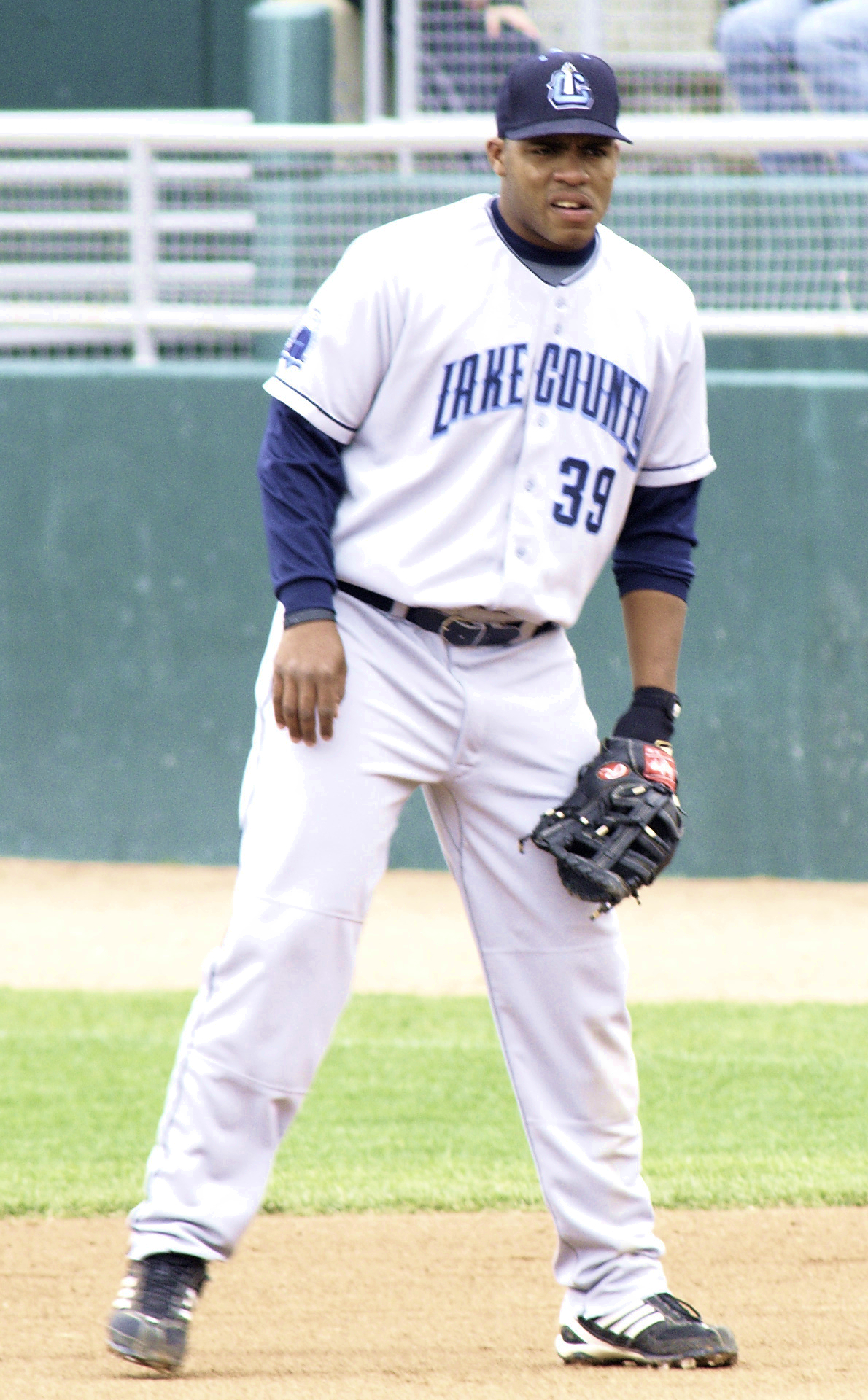
Aguilar playing for the Lake County Captains in 2011

Playing for the Akron Aeros of the Double–A Eastern League in 2013, Aguilar had a .275 batting average, 28 doubles, 16 home runs, and 105 runs batted in (RBIs), setting an Akron franchise record in RBIs. He was added to the Indians' 40-man roster on November 20, 2013.

Starting the 2014 season with the Columbus Clippers of the Triple–A International League, Aguilar batted .298 with seven home runs and 19 RBIs in 37 games, before the Indians promoted him to the major leagues on May 15, 2014. He was returned to Columbus on June 6 after playing in eight games for the Indians.

Aguliar began the 2015 season with Columbus. He was named the International League's starting first baseman in the Triple-A All-Star Game. The Indians promoted Aguilar back to the major leagues on July 24. In 2016, Aguilar led the International League with 30 home runs and 92 RBIs. However, the Indians designated Aguilar for assignment on January 26, 2017.

=== Milwaukee Brewers ===
Aguilar was claimed off waivers by the Milwaukee Brewers on February 2, 2017. After a strong performance during spring training in 2017, Aguilar made the Brewers' Opening Day roster. He played in 133 games, finishing the season with a .265 batting average, .331 OBP, 16 home runs, and 52 RBIs.

Aguilar continued to play in 2018, due to an injury to Eric Thames. Batting .307 with 23 home runs and 67 RBIs, he won the NL's Final Vote for the 2018 MLB All-Star Game and he also accepted an invitation to participate in the Home Run Derby. He cooled off in the second half, but still finished the season hitting .274 with 35 home runs and 108 RBI, and tied for the major league lead in sacrifice flies (10). In the 2018 NLDS, against the Colorado Rockies, he went 1-for-11 with a home run in Game 3 off of German Marquez in the Brewers' series-clinching 6-0 victory. In October 2018, Aguilar won the Luis Aparicio Award, which is given annually to a Venezuelan player in Major League Baseball who is judged to have recorded the best individual performance in that year.

=== Tampa Bay Rays ===
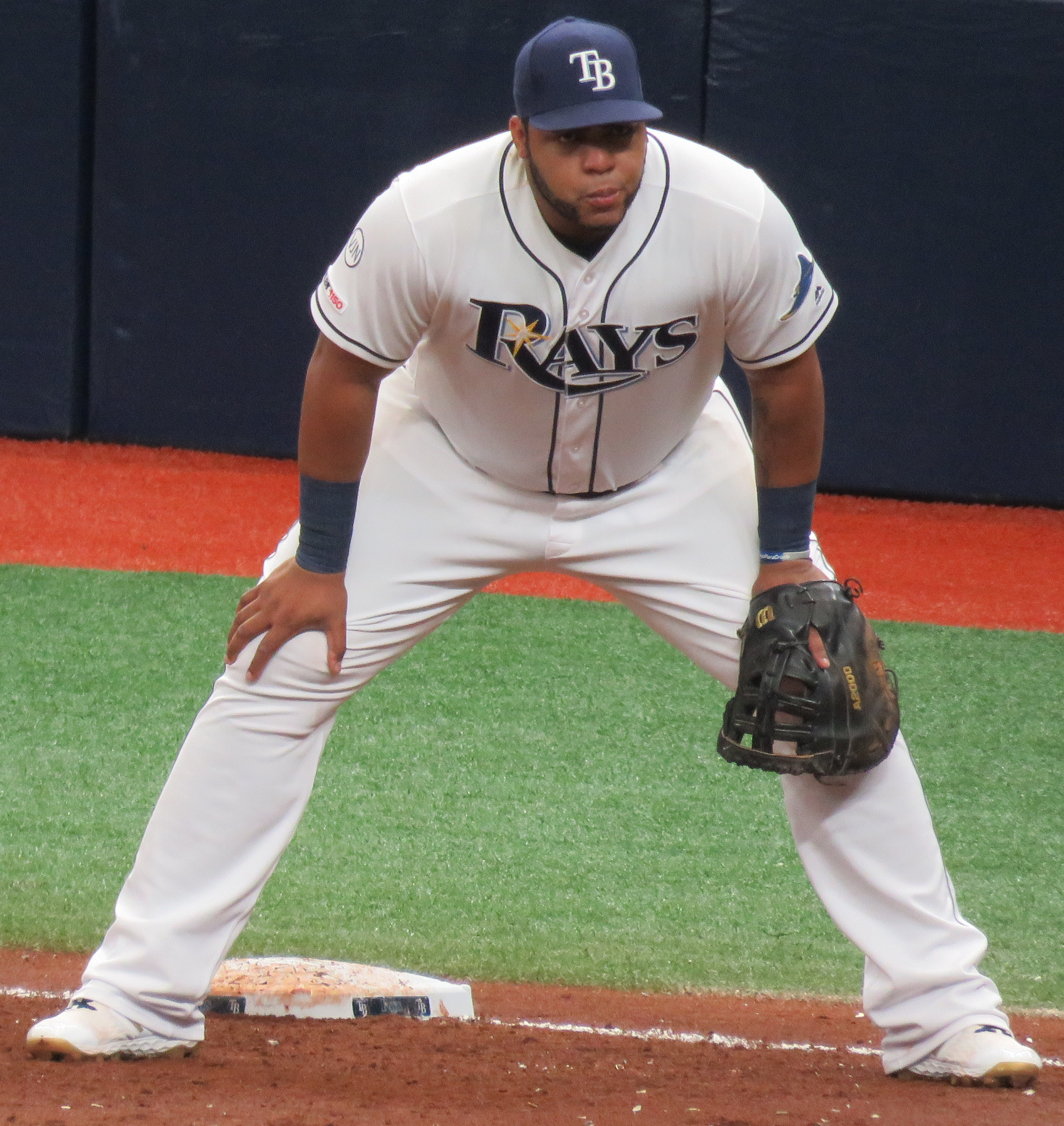
Aguilar with the Tampa Bay Rays

On July 31, 2019, the Brewers traded Aguilar to the Tampa Bay Rays in exchange for Jake Faria. After the trade to Tampa Bay, Aguilar hit .261 in 37 games for the team. He was designated for assignment on November 27, 2019.

=== Miami Marlins ===
On December 2, 2019, the Miami Marlins claimed Aguilar off of waivers. In 2020, Aguilar hit .277/.352/.457 with eight home runs and 34 RBIs during the shortened 60-game season. In 2021, Aguilar hit .261/.329/.459 with 22 home runs and 93 RBIs in 131 games.

After batting .236 with 15 home runs and 49 RBIs in 2022, Aguilar was designated for assignment by the Marlins on August 26. He cleared waivers and was released on August 28.

=== Baltimore Orioles ===
Aguilar signed a minor league contract with the Baltimore Orioles on August 31, 2022. He had his contract selected on September 1, 2022. He batted .235/.281/.379 between the two teams.

=== Oakland Athletics ===
On January 27, 2023, Aguilar signed a one-year, $3 million contract with the Oakland Athletics. Aguilar played in 36 games for Oakland, batting .221/.281/.385 with 5 home runs and 9 RBI. On May 29, he was designated for assignment by the A's after Paul Blackburn was activated off of the injured list.

=== Atlanta Braves ===
On June 13, 2023, Aguilar signed a minor league contract with the Atlanta Braves organization. In 56 games for the Triple–A Gwinnett Stripers, he batted .271/.373/.379 with 5 home runs and 34 RBI. Aguilar elected free agency following the season on November 6.

=== Saitama Seibu Lions ===
On December 18, 2023, Aguilar signed with the Saitama Seibu Lions of Nippon Professional Baseball. He played in 30 games for Seibu in 2024, posting a .204/.274/.301 batting line with two home runs and 10 RBI. On August 22, 2024, it was announced that Aguilar had undergone an endoscopic cleaning surgery on the back of his right ankle. He was subsequently ruled out for the remainder of the season, due to the recovery timetable of two months. It was announced on October 30, that the Lions would not renew Aguilar's contract for the 2025 season, making him a free agent.

== Personal life ==
Aguilar was born to Jesus and Maria Aguilar, and is the youngest of three children.

== See also ==
- List of Major League Baseball players from Venezuela
