= Xander Bogaerts =

Aruban baseball player (born 1992)

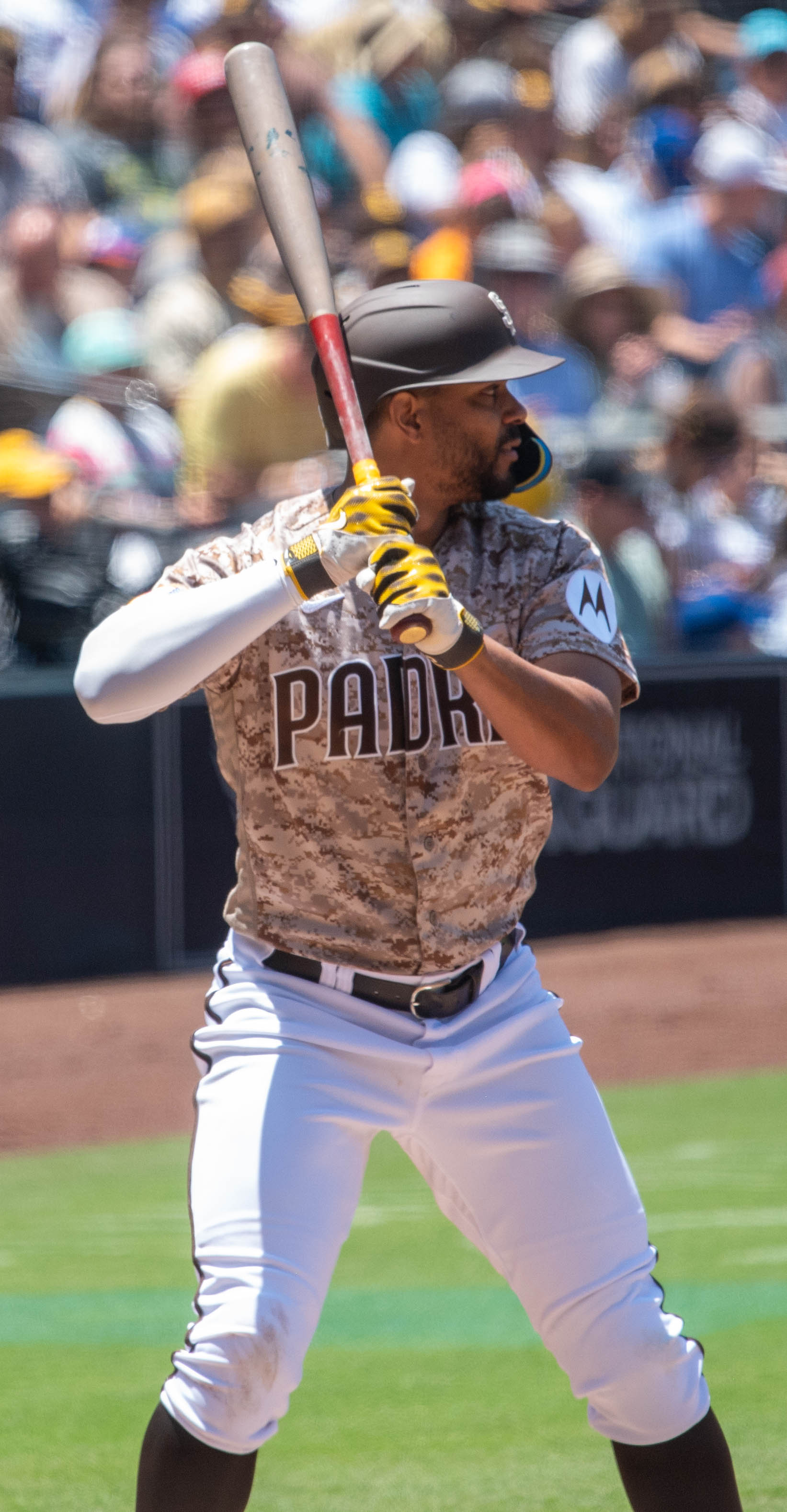
- Bogaerts with the San Diego Padres in 2023

San Diego Padres – No. 2
- Shortstop / Second baseman
- Born: October 1, 1992 (age 34); San Nicolaas, Aruba
- Bats: Right Throws: Right

MLB debut
- August 20, 2013, for the Boston Red Sox

MLB statistics (through 2026 season)
- Batting average: .283
- Hits: 1,942
- Home runs: 210
- Runs batted in: 895
- Stats at Baseball Reference

Teams
- Boston Red Sox (2013–2022); San Diego Padres (2023–present)

Career highlights and awards
- 4× All-Star (2016, 2019, 2021, 2022); 2× World Series champion (2013, 2018); All-MLB First Team (2019); 5× Silver Slugger Award (2015, 2016, 2019, 2021, 2022)
Medals
Men's baseball
Representing Netherlands
Baseball World Cup
Gold medal – first place	2011 Panama	Team

Xander Jan Bogaerts (born October 1, 1992; Papiamento pronunciation: [ˈsandər ˈboxarts]) is an Aruban professional baseball shortstop for the San Diego Padres of Major League Baseball (MLB). He has previously played in MLB for the Boston Red Sox. He represents the Netherlands national team in international competition.

After signing as an amateur free agent with the Red Sox in 2009, Bogaerts made his MLB debut in 2013, appearing in 30 games between the regular season and postseason, and helping the Red Sox to the World Series championship. He became the Red Sox' starting shortstop in 2014 and later won his second World Series in 2018. He is a five-time winner of the American League's Silver Slugger Award, as well as a four-time All-Star. He has the most games played at shortstop for the Red Sox, having set the record in 2022. After 10 seasons with Boston, Bogaerts signed an 11-year contract with the Padres following the 2022 season. He was moved to second base for one season in 2024.

== Professional career ==
=== Minor leagues ===
Bogaerts was noticed in 2009, at the age of 16, by Mike Lord, a scout for the Boston Red Sox. After not playing baseball for two weeks due to the chicken pox, Bogaerts played for Lord, who recommended him to Craig Shipley, the Red Sox' vice president of international scouting. Shipley flew to Aruba to watch Bogaerts play. The Red Sox signed him to a contract with a $410,000 signing bonus.

Bogaerts made his professional debut in 2010 in the Dominican Summer League (DSL), where he had a .314 batting average, .396 on-base percentage, and .423 slugging percentage. He led the DSL Red Sox in each of those categories, along with hits (75), home runs (3), runs batted in (RBIs; 42), and total bases (101). He was fifth in the DSL in RBIs and tenth in total bases, and he had a .929 fielding percentage. The next year, at age 18, Bogaerts played for the Greenville Drive of the Single-A South Atlantic League, where he had a slash line of .260/.324/.509, fielded .924, and hit 16 home runs in 72 games.

During the 2012 season, Bogaerts started out in Single-A and ended up playing with the Portland Sea Dogs of the Double-A Eastern League. He was named to appear in the 2012 All-Star Futures Game. Heading into the 2013 season, Bogaerts ranked sixth in the MLB.com Top 100 Prospects list, eighth in the Baseball America Top 100 Prospects list, and was ranked the fifth-best prospect by ESPN's Keith Law, who described him as "Still just 20 years old, Bogaerts has been playing solid shortstop for Portland with a solid walk rate but isn't yet generating the power expected from his explosive swing."

=== Boston Red Sox ===
==== 2013–2015 ====
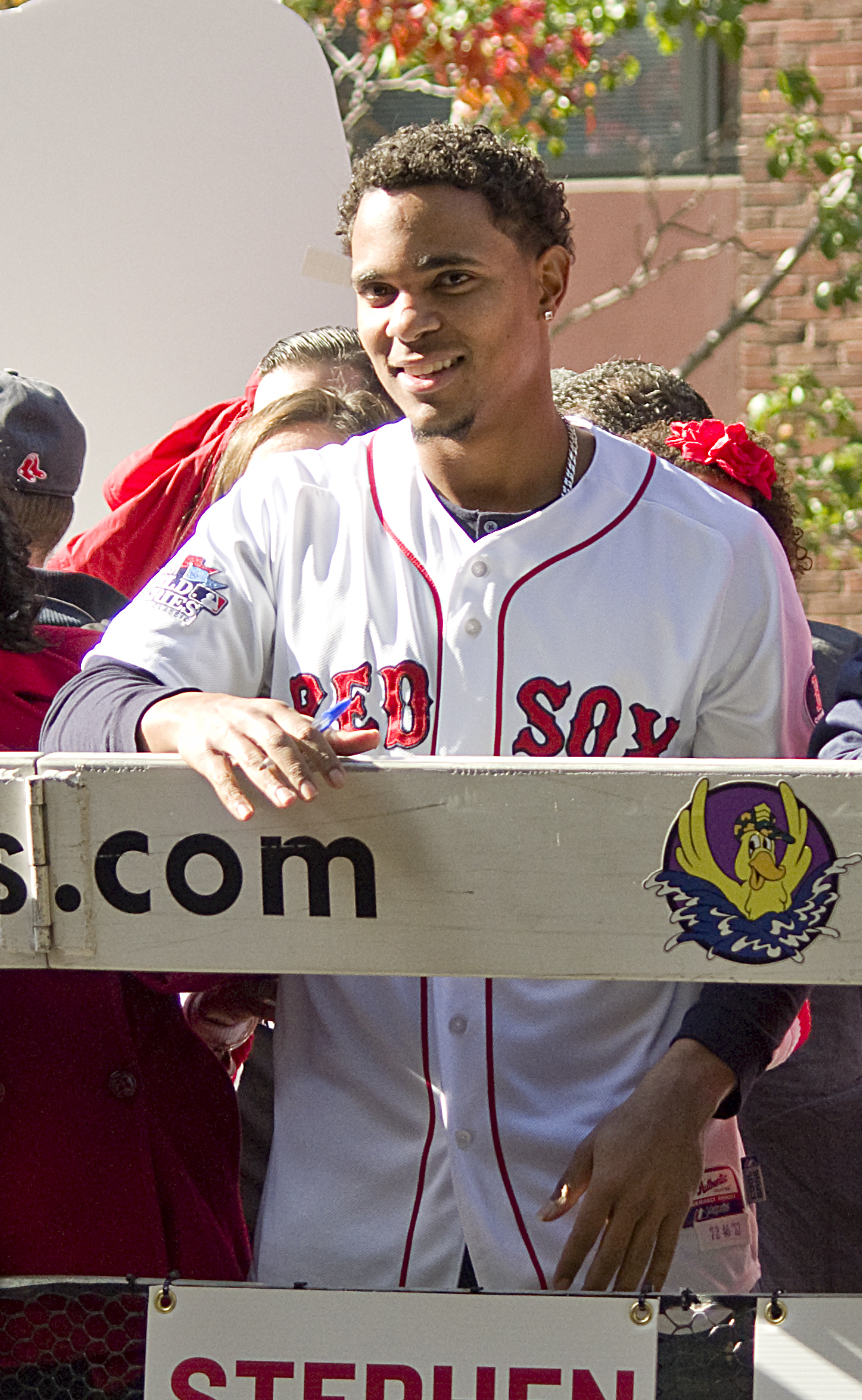
Bogaerts celebrating the 2013 World Series championship

Bogaerts started the season in Double-A and was promoted to the Pawtucket Red Sox of the Triple-A International League in mid-June. The Red Sox promoted Bogaerts to the major leagues on August 19. Bogaerts made his MLB debut on August 20 against the San Francisco Giants. He got his first major league hit five days later against the Los Angeles Dodgers. On September 7, Bogaerts hit his first MLB home run against New York Yankees pitcher Jim Miller. At the end of the minor league season, Bogaerts gained USA Today Minor League Player of the Year honors and was named to the Baseball America Minor League All-Star Team. During his brief stint in the majors in 2013, Bogaerts appeared in 18 regular season games batting .250 with a home run, five RBIs, and a stolen base.

Despite debuting late in the season, Bogaerts was part of the 25-man active roster during the postseason run. Bogaerts had a strong performance in the postseason, batting .296 with two RBIs in 12 games, eventually leading to the Red Sox winning their eighth World Series in franchise history.

Bogaerts began the 2014 season as the starting shortstop for Boston. On May 29, he had his first walk-off plate appearance on a throwing error by Atlanta Braves third baseman Chris Johnson, allowing teammate Jackie Bradley Jr. to score. On June 2, the Red Sox re-signed Stephen Drew, and Bogaerts was moved back to third base. Bogaerts returned to shortstop once again when the Red Sox sent Drew to the rival New York Yankees at the trade deadline on July 31. For the season, Bogaerts played 99 games at shortstop and 44 games at third, batting .240 with 12 home runs and 46 RBIs.

In 2015, Bogaerts led the Red Sox with a career-high .320 average (along with seven home runs and 81 RBIs), finishing second only to Miguel Cabrera for the American League (AL) batting title. From late July, Bogaerts began to bat second or third exclusively. He had 10 hits with the bases loaded, the most in MLB. He won the AL Silver Slugger Award for shortstop. On top of his breakout offense, Bogaerts was also a finalist for the Rawlings Gold Glove Award at shortstop.

==== 2016–2019 ====
In 2016, Bogaerts again began the season as the Red Sox' starting shortstop, primarily batting third. Between May 6 and June 2, Bogaerts hit safely in 26 consecutive games. His hitting streak came to an end in a loss to the Toronto Blue Jays on June 3. He was chosen to play in the MLB All-Star Game, the first of his career; he started at shortstop and went 1-for-2. Bogaerts finished the season batting .294 with 21 home runs and 89 RBIs and won his second Silver Slugger Award.

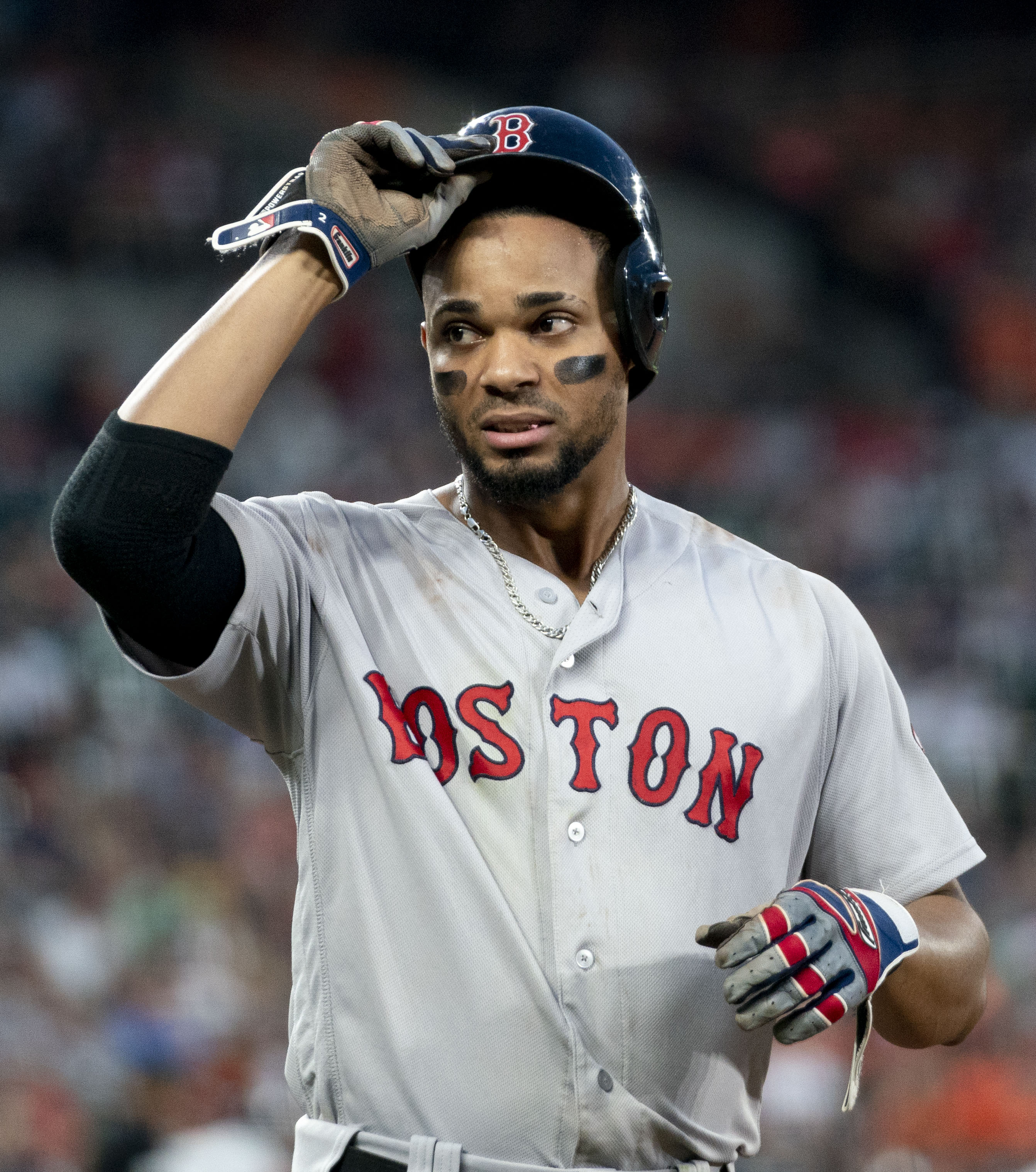
Bogaerts with the Red Sox in 2018

Bogaerts became eligible for salary arbitration in 2017. He and the Red Sox avoided an arbitration hearing by agreeing to a $4.5 million salary for the season. In 2017, Bogaerts usually hit in the sixth spot in the batting order. On July 6, he was hit on the right wrist by a pitch from Jacob Faria of the Tampa Bay Rays. It was later diagnosed as a sprained joint. Despite this, Bogaerts declined to go on the disabled list and played while injured for the rest of the season. He later admitted this was a mistake, stating that he went through a two-month stretch in which he could not swing comfortably. As a result, he finished the season batting .273 with just 10 home runs and 62 RBIs.

Bogaerts and the Red Sox agreed to a $7.05 million salary for the 2018 season. He began the season usually batting fifth in the lineup. He hit two grand slams in April; one on April 7 against the Tampa Bay Rays, and one on April 30 against the Kansas City Royals. Bogaerts was named AL Player of the Week for the week of July 2–8. He hit another grand slam on July 14, this one an extra-innings walk-off home run against the Toronto Blue Jays. For the regular season, Bogaerts had 23 home runs, 103 RBIs, and a .288 average. The Red Sox finished the year 108–54 and won the World Series over the Los Angeles Dodgers. Bogaerts was the only player on the Red Sox roster for both the 2013 and 2018 World Series.

The Red Sox and Bogaerts agreed on a $12 million salary for the 2019 season in January. On April 1, the Red Sox announced that he agreed to a six-year contract extension worth $132 million; the deal included an opt-out clause that Bogaerts could exercise after the 2022 season, which he later did. On July 3, MLB announced that Bogaerts had been selected for the All-Star Game. On September 7, he registered his 1,000th MLB career hit, in a game against the Yankees. Bogaerts finished the season with a .309 average, 52 doubles, 33 home runs and 117 RBIs (second in the American League). He finished fifth in AL Most Valuable Player Award voting and won his third Silver Slugger Award.

==== 2020–2022 ====
During the shortened 2020 season, Bogaerts was again Boston's primary shortstop. On August 2 against the Yankees, he had four hits with two homers and three RBIs. Bogaerts had two multi-steal games–on September 12 against the Rays and on September 18 against the Yankees. He finished the season with a 10-game hitting streak and 18-game on-base streak. Overall with the Red Sox, he batted .300 with 11 home runs, 28 RBIs, and 8 stolen bases in 56 games. Bogaerts led all AL shortstops in home runs and RBIs and was second in runs, total bases, on-base percentage, slugging, and on-base plus slugging (OPS).

Bogaerts returned as Boston's primary shortstop in 2021. On July 1, he was named the AL starting shortstop for the All-Star Game. On August 31, Bogaerts was removed from a game in Tampa Bay due to a positive COVID-19 test. He returned to the lineup on September 10. Bogaerts played in 144 games during the regular season for Boston, batting .295 with 23 home runs and 79 RBIs. He also appeared in 11 postseason games, batting 12-for-46 (.261) as the Red Sox advanced to the AL Championship Series. On November 11, Bogaerts won his fourth Silver Slugger Award.

In 2022, Bogaerts again served as the primary shortstop for the Red Sox. On July 10, he was named to the AL roster for the All-Star Game as a reserve. On September 6, he was named AL Player of the Week after batting 15-for-31 in seven games. For the season, Bogaerts batted .307 with 15 home runs and 73 RBIs in 150 games. He was again nominated for a Gold Glove Award and the All-MLB Team and won his fifth Silver Slugger Award.

On November 7, Bogaerts opted out of his Red Sox contract and became a free agent.

=== San Diego Padres ===
On December 9, 2022, Bogaerts signed an 11-year, $280 million contract with the San Diego Padres.

On April 29, 2023, Bogaerts hit a home run in the MLB Mexico City Series, becoming the first player in MLB history to hit home runs in four different countries: the United States, Canada, the United Kingdom, and Mexico. He batted .285 with 19 home runs and 19 steals in his first season in San Diego.

Entering the 2024 season, Bogaerts was moved to second base, and Ha-seong Kim was moved to shortstop. On May 20, Bogaerts fractured his left shoulder while attempting a diving play on a ball hit by Ronald Acuña Jr. He was placed on the 10-day injury list on May 22, (retroactive to May 21). He returned in July. In 111 games, he hit .264 with 11 home runs. He fared poorly in his first postseason with the Padres, batting .167 with one home run in seven games.

In 2025, Bogaerts played mainly at shortstop due to Kim leaving in free agency. His defensive value improved. After a slow start, he hit .290 or higher in June and July. On August 27, Bogarts fractured his left foot when he fouled a ball off his foot against the Seattle Mariners. He was placed on the 10-day injured list on August 29. He returned from the injured list on September 23. For the season, Bogaerts batted .263 with 11 home runs and 53 RBI in 136 games. He hit 4-for-12 with a double in the National League (NL) Wild Card Series loss to the Chicago Cubs.

In 2026, Bogaerts batted a career-low .231. His OPS was below .640 when he was dropped to eighth in the batting order on July 21. In September, he slashed .315/.425/.479 with a .905 OPS. He mostly batted sixth or seventh after September 8, the last of 24 games in which he hit eighth. He adjusted his batting stance, adding a small gap between his hands. With this split grip, he hit a home run in Game 1 of the NL Wild Card Series and doubled in the second game of the sweep of the Cubs. He scored the winning run and started the game-ending double play in Game 3 of the NL Division Series.

== International career ==
As a citizen of Aruba, a constituent country of the Netherlands, Bogaerts played for the Dutch national team in the 2011 Baseball World Cup (which the team won), and the World Baseball Classic (WBC) beginning in 2013. the 2013 World Baseball Classic (WBC). In the 2017 WBC, Bogaerts slashed .227/.419/.318, with five hits in 22 at-bats. He led the team with seven walks.

Bogaerts returned to the Dutch team at the 2023 WBC. He slashed .267/.353/.533 in 15 at-bats over four games of pool play. However, Pool A ended in a five-way tie, with all five teams finishing with 2–2 records, and the Netherlands was eliminated by tiebreaker.

Bogaerts committed to play for the Netherlands in the 2026 WBC. He slashed .333/.412/.300 in 15 at-bats over four games of pool play, playing shortstop for every inning. The Netherlands went 1–3 and were in the first round.

== Personal life ==
Bogaerts has a twin brother named Jair who also signed with the Red Sox as an international free agent. Jair was sent to the Chicago Cubs prior to the 2012 season to complete the compensation regarding Theo Epstein but did not play in affiliated baseball again. Their uncle taught them to play baseball.

Bogaerts is the fifth Aruban to play in MLB, following Sidney Ponson, Calvin Maduro, Gene Kingsale, and Radhames Dykhoff. After winning the 2011 Baseball World Cup, Bogaerts was inducted into the Knights Order of Orange-Nassau by the Governor of Aruba.

Bogaerts speaks four languages: English, Spanish, Dutch, and Papiamento, the latter two being Aruba's official languages. On February 10, 2021, the Commandeur Pieter Boer School in San Nicolas, Aruba, changed its name to Scol Basico Xander Bogaerts.

== See also ==
- List of Boston Red Sox award winners
- List of Boston Red Sox team records
- List of largest sports contracts
- List of Major League Baseball career games played as a shortstop leaders
- List of Major League Baseball career assists leaders
- List of Major League Baseball career double plays leaders
- List of Major League Baseball players from the Netherlands Antilles
