= List of Major League Baseball players from Aruba and Curaçao =

This is a list of baseball players from Netherlands Antilles (Aruba and Curaçao) who have played in Major League Baseball. Hensley Meulens was the first player from the Netherlands Antilles to make it into the Major Leagues. In Bold denotes still active players in the league.

== Players ==
| Name | Debut | Final game | Position | Teams | Ref |
|---|---|---|---|---|---|
| Hensley Meulens | August 23, 1989 | May 14, 1998 | Infielder, Outfielder | New York Yankees (1989–1993); Montreal Expos (1997); Arizona Diamondbacks (1998) | |
| Ralph Milliard | May 12, 1996 | September 27, 1998 | Infielder | Florida Marlins (1996–1997); New York Mets (1998) | |
| Andruw Jones | August 15, 1996 | October 3, 2012 | Outfielder | Atlanta Braves (1996–2007); Los Angeles Dodgers (2008); Texas Rangers (2009); Chicago White Sox (2010); New York Yankees (2011–2012) | |
| Gene Kingsale | September 3, 1996 | June 8, 2003 | Outfielder | Baltimore Orioles (1996, 1998–2001); Seattle Mariners (2001–2002); San Diego Padres (2002); Detroit Tigers (2003) | |
| Calvin Maduro | September 8, 1996 | June 4, 2002 | Pitcher | Philadelphia Phillies (1996–1997); Baltimore Orioles (2000–2002) | |
| Randall Simon | September 1, 1997 | September 30, 2006 | Infielder | Atlanta Braves (1997–1999); Detroit Tigers (2001–2002); Pittsburgh Pirates (2003, 2004); Chicago Cubs (2003); Tampa Bay Devil Rays (2004); Philadelphia Phillies (2006) | |
| Sidney Ponson | April 19, 1998 | July 31, 2009 | Pitcher | Baltimore Orioles (1998–2003, 2004–2005); San Francisco Giants (2003); St. Louis Cardinals (2006); New York Yankees (2006, 2008); Minnesota Twins (2007); Texas Rangers (2008); Kansas City Royals (2009) | |
| Radhames Dykhoff | June 7, 1998 | June 7, 1998 | Pitcher | Baltimore Orioles (1998) | |
| Ivanon Coffie | July 15, 2000 | September 20, 2000 | Infielder | Baltimore Orioles (2000) | |
| Yurendell de Caster | May 21, 2006 | June 7, 2006 | Infielder | Pittsburgh Pirates (2006) | |
| Jair Jurrjens | August 15, 2007 | July 9, 2014 | Pitcher | Detroit Tigers (2007); Atlanta Braves (2008–2012); Baltimore Orioles (2013); Colorado Rockies (2014) | |
| Wladimir Balentien | September 4, 2007 | October 2, 2009 | Outfielder | Seattle Mariners (2007–2009); Cincinnati Reds (2009) | |
| Roger Bernadina | June 29, 2008 | September 28, 2014 | Outfielder | Washington Nationals (2008–2013); Philadelphia Phillies (2013); Cincinnati Reds (2014); Los Angeles Dodgers (2014) | |
| Shairon Martis | September 4, 2008 | September 27, 2013 | Pitcher | Washington Nationals (2008–2009); Minnesota Twins (2013) | |
| **Kenley Jansen** | July 24, 2010 | | Pitcher | Los Angeles Dodgers (2010–2021); Atlanta Braves (2022); Boston Red Sox (2023–2024); Los Angeles Angels (2025); Detroit Tigers (2026–present) | |
| Andrelton Simmons | June 2, 2012 | July 10, 2022 | Infielder | Atlanta Braves (2012–2015); Los Angeles Angels (2016–2020); Minnesota Twins (2021); Chicago Cubs (2022) | |
| **Jurickson Profar** | September 2, 2012 | | Infielder, Outfielder | Texas Rangers (2012–2013, 2016–2018); Oakland Athletics (2019); San Diego Padres (2020–2022, 2023–2024); Colorado Rockies (2023); Atlanta Braves (2025–present) | |
| **Xander Bogaerts** | August 20, 2013 | | Infielder | Boston Red Sox (2013–2022); San Diego Padres (2022–present) | |
| Jonathan Schoop | September 25, 2013 | July 6, 2023 | Infielder | Baltimore Orioles (2013–2018); Milwaukee Brewers (2018); Minnesota Twins (2019); Detroit Tigers (2020–2023) | |
| **Ozzie Albies** | August 1, 2017 | | Infielder | Atlanta Braves (2017–present) | |
| **Chadwick Tromp** | July 29, 2020 | | Catcher | San Francisco Giants (2020–2021); Atlanta Braves (2022–2025); Baltimore Orioles (2025) | |
| Sherten Apostel | September 12, 2020 | September 24, 2020 | Infielder | Texas Rangers (2020) | |
| **Ceddanne Rafaela** | August 28, 2023 | | Outfielder | Boston Red Sox (2023–present) | |
| **Antwone Kelly** | June 12, 2026 | | Pitcher | Pittsburgh Pirates (2026–present) | |

== Resources ==
- Baseball Reference
