= Rafael Furcal =

Dominican baseball player (born 1977)

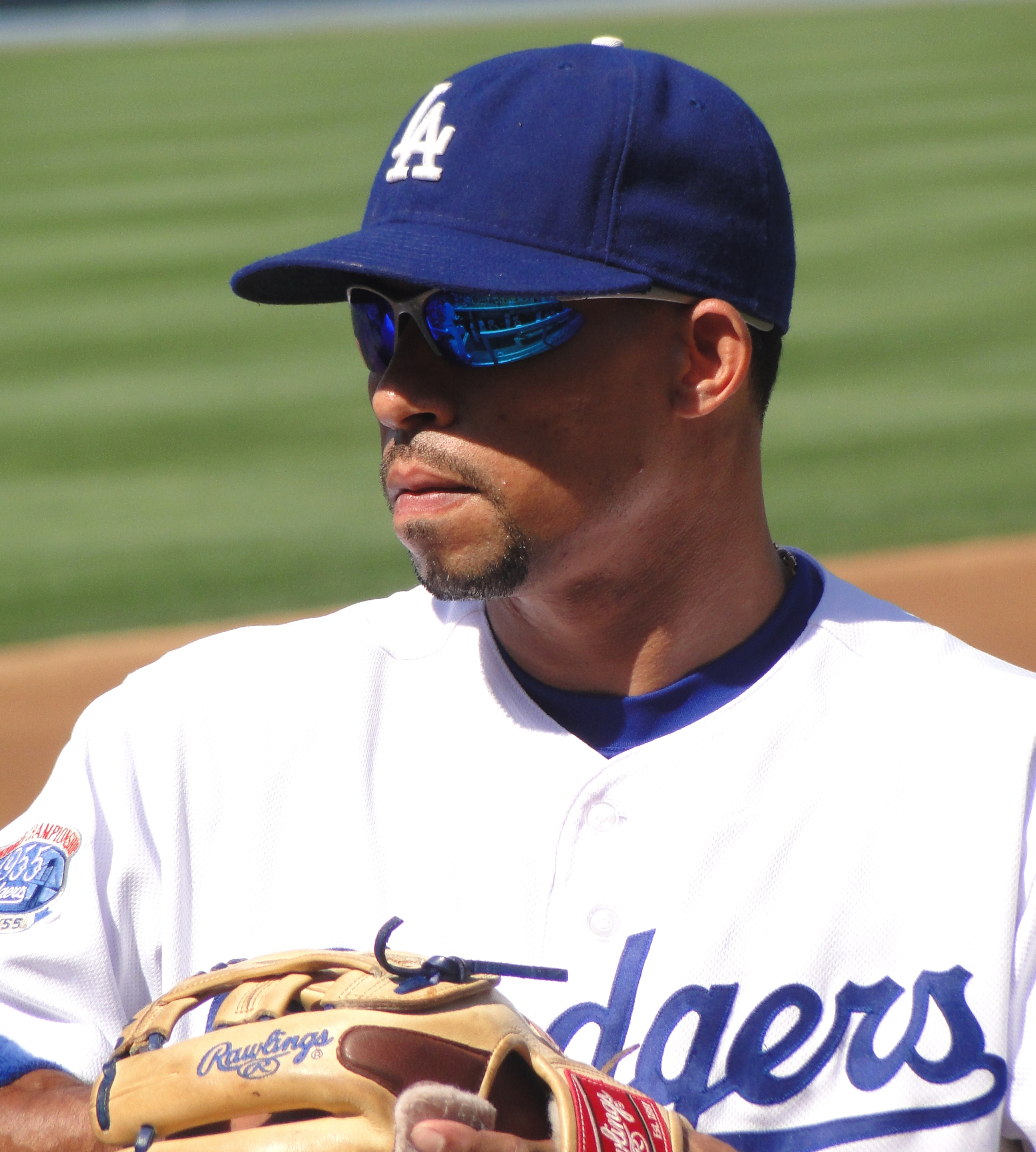
- Furcal with the Los Angeles Dodgers
- Shortstop
- Born: October 24, 1977 (age 49); Loma de Cabrera, Dominican Republic
- Batted: Switch Threw: Right

MLB debut
- April 4, 2000, for the Atlanta Braves

Last MLB appearance
- June 21, 2014, for the Miami Marlins

MLB statistics
- Batting average: .281
- Home runs: 113
- Runs batted in: 587
- Stats at Baseball Reference

Teams
- Atlanta Braves (2000–2005); Los Angeles Dodgers (2006–2011); St. Louis Cardinals (2011–2012); Miami Marlins (2014)

Career highlights and awards
- 3× All-Star (2003, 2010, 2012); World Series champion (2011); NL Rookie of the Year (2000)

Rafael Antoni Furcal (born October 24, 1977) is a Dominican former professional baseball shortstop. He played in Major League Baseball (MLB) for the Atlanta Braves, Los Angeles Dodgers, St. Louis Cardinals, and Miami Marlins. With St. Louis, he won the 2011 World Series over the Texas Rangers.

== Early life ==
Furcal grew up in Loma de Cabrera, a small village in the Dominican Republic near the Dajabón River and the border with Haiti. His father, Silvino, drove a taxi, and his mother, Aura, was a schoolteacher. Furcal had three older brothers, José, Manuel, and Lorenzo, and a sister.

Silvino Furcal was a standout outfielder during an era when Dominican ballplayers did not get much recognition from Major League scouts. Silvino introduced his sons to baseball and Rafael credited his father with teaching him how to enjoy the game. Until his death in 2010, Silvino would often call Rafael to give him advice after games. Manuel Furcal pitched in the Seattle Mariners organization and Lorenzo played in the Oakland Athletics system before suffering career-ending injuries. José Furcal committed suicide in 1999 and Manuel died that same year in an accident.

Furcal attended Jose Cabrera High School and was prepared to enroll in engineering school before being spotted by a scout at a tryout in Santo Domingo. He was subsequently signed as an amateur free agent by the Atlanta Braves on November 9, 1996, for $5,000.

== Professional career ==
=== Atlanta Braves ===
==== Minor leagues ====
Furcal began his professional career as a second baseman with the rookie-level Gulf Coast League Braves in 1997. The following season, with the Danville Braves, he hit .328 and stole a league-record 60 bases in only 66 games. He was named Danville's Player of the Year and Appalachian League All-Star Second Baseman.

In 1999, Furcal switched to shortstop and joined the Macon Braves in Single-A and hit .337 with 73 stolen bases in 83 games. He was transferred to the High-A Myrtle Beach Pelicans and hit .293 for them with 23 steals in 43 games. Furcal led all of minor league baseball with 96 steals total. He was named to Baseball America's first team All-Star team and the South Atlantic League All-Star team. In addition, Furcal was the Braves Minor League Player of the Year, the South Atlantic League Most Outstanding Prospect and a Single-A All-Star.

==== Major leagues ====
An injury to Braves shortstop Walt Weiss prior to the 2000 season led to Furcal improbably making the jump from "A" ball to the Major League roster. He made his Major League debut on April 4, 2000, against the Colorado Rockies, getting 2 hits in 4 at-bats. His first hit was against Rockies pitcher Rolando Arrojo.

Furcal went on to hit .295 with 40 stolen bases for the Braves and won the National League Rookie of the Year Award that year.

He missed most of the 2001 season because of a dislocated left shoulder, suffered while stealing second base in a July 6 game at Boston.

The Braves learned Furcal's true age, then 23, at the start of the 2002 season. Before then, he had claimed he was only 21. He returned to the starting lineup that season and tied a modern Major League record with three triples in a game on April 21 against Florida.

Furcal completed an unassisted triple play for the Braves against the St. Louis Cardinals on August 10, 2003. It was the 12th in baseball history. In the fifth inning, the shortstop caught pitcher Woody Williams' liner with the runners moving in a hit and run attempt, stepped on second base to retire catcher Mike Matheny (who later became Furcal's manager in St. Louis) and tagged Orlando Palmeiro before he could return to first.

He was selected to the National League All-Star Team as a reserve in 2003.

In September 2004, during his final season with the Braves, he was arrested for drunk driving, violating his probation dating from an earlier drunk driving arrest in June 2000. Furcal was ordered to serve 21 days in jail. In an unusual arrangement, the beginning of the jail term was contingent upon the Braves' situation on the playoffs. His DUI attorney arranged that resolution so that the baseball team had its full contingency of players for the playoffs. Once the Braves were eliminated from post-season action, Furcal served his time.

=== Los Angeles Dodgers ===
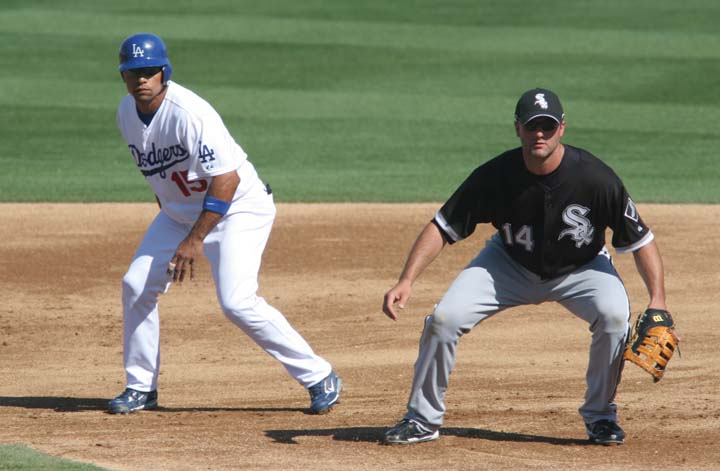
Furcal (left) with White Sox first baseman Paul Konerko during spring training action, 2008.

On December 7, 2005, Furcal signed a free agent contract with the Los Angeles Dodgers for three years and $39 million. In September 2006 Furcal was selected as the inaugural winner of the Roy Campanella Award, given to the Dodgers player who best exemplifies the spirit and leadership of the late Hall of Fame catcher. The award was voted on by only his teammates.

In May 2007, he became one of only six Major League players to get 4 hits in each of 3 consecutive games.

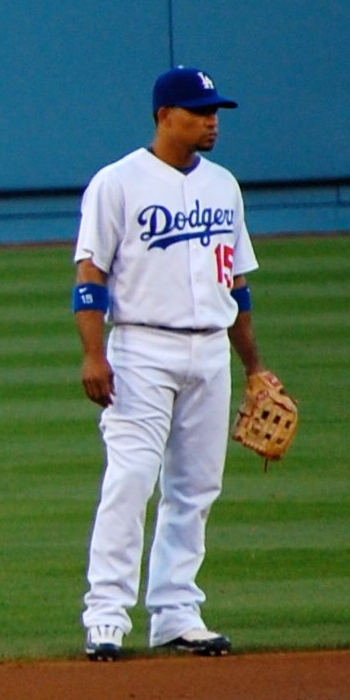
Furcal with the Dodgers in 2009.

Early in 2008, he suffered a back injury that kept him sidelined for most of the season, not returning until right before the playoffs started.

In the fifth inning of Game Five the 2008 National League Championship Series against the Philadelphia Phillies, Furcal made three errors to set records for most errors in one NLCS inning and game. He was just the second player to make three errors in one postseason inning. No shortstop had made three errors in one playoff game since Buck Weaver in the 1917 World Series. Two of the errors came on the same play as Furcal booted a routine groundball hit by Pat Burrell and then airmailed his throw behind home plate in a failed attempt to prevent Chase Utley from scoring.

On December 19, 2008, after speculation that he would re-sign with the Braves as a free agent, Furcal signed a 3-year $30 million contract to stay with the Dodgers.

Furcal struggled in the first year of his new contract, hitting only .269 for the Dodgers in 2009. His on-base plus slugging of .711 was also below his career average of .757.

Furcal was added to the 2010 National League All-Star team as a reserve after New York Mets shortstop José Reyes suffered an injury and was forced to withdraw. Furcal walked in his only plate appearance in the game. Due to injuries he only appeared in 97 games for the Dodgers in 2010, but finished with a .300 batting average and stole 22 bases.

In 2011, he spent more time on the disabled list than the active roster for the Dodgers, appearing in just 37 games, during which he hit only .197.

=== St. Louis Cardinals ===
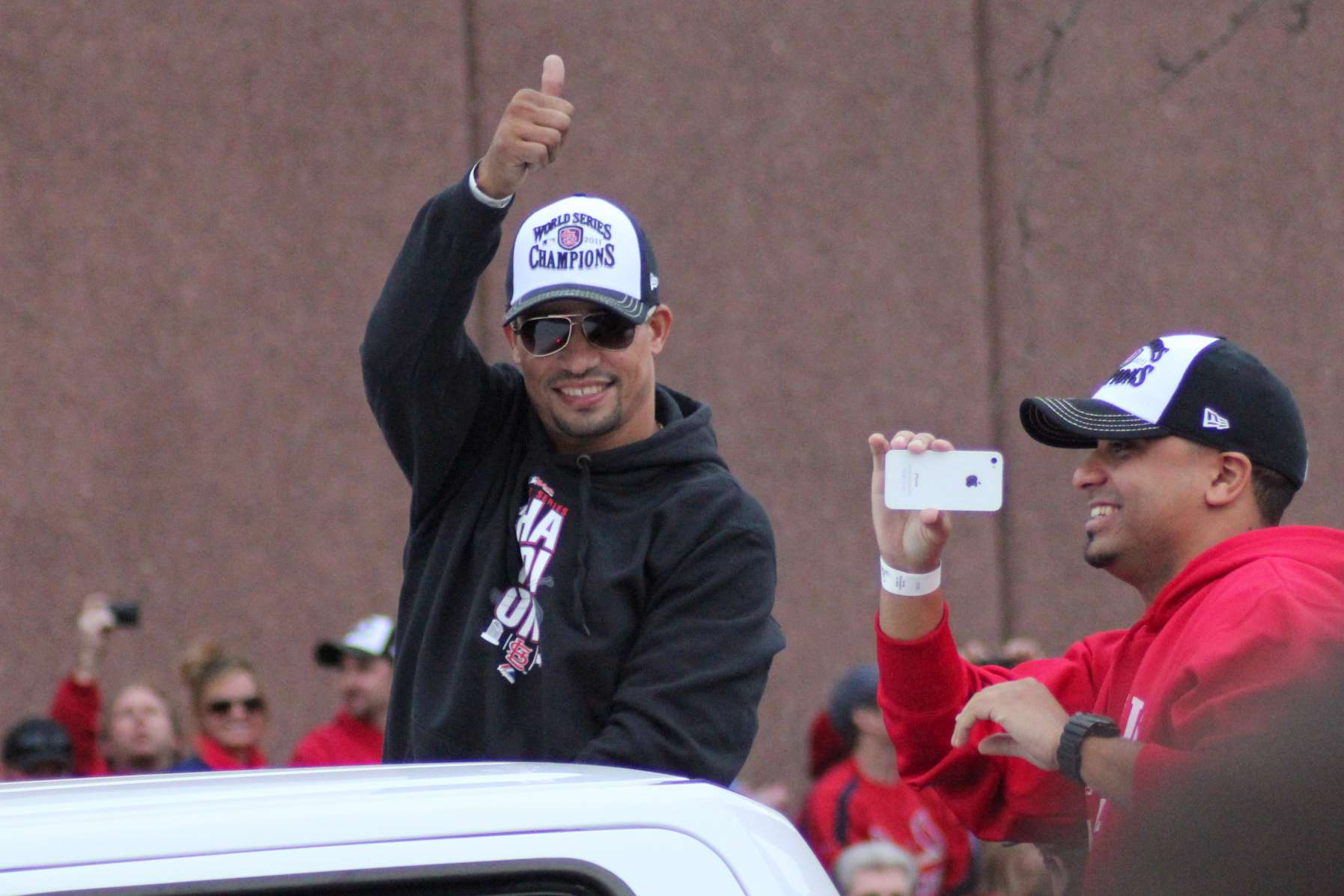
Furcal during the 2011 World Series Parade

Furcal was traded along with cash considerations to the St. Louis Cardinals on July 30, 2011 for Double-A outfielder Alex Castellanos. In 50 games with the Cardinals, he hit .255 with 7 home runs. In the 2011 World Series, he only hit .179 but picked up his only World Series ring when the Cards won the series by beating the Texas Rangers in seven games.

On October 31, 2011, the St. Louis Cardinals declined his $12 million option for 2012. The club signed Furcal to a 2-year, $14 million deal on December 10, 2011. During the 2012 season Furcal was batting .264 with five home runs and 49 RBIs until being sidelined with an elbow injury on August 30. An MRI of the elbow revealed damage to a ligament in his throwing arm. Furcal would be placed on the disabled list for the remainder of the season in order to undergo four to six weeks of physical rehabilitation in the hopes of forestalling surgical repair. As a replacement for Furcal, the Cardinals called up Pete Kozma from the Triple-A affiliate Memphis Redbirds.

On March 7, 2013 the Cardinals announced that Furcal would undergo Tommy John surgery and would almost certainly miss all of the 2013 baseball season. An off-season program of rest and rehabilitation for his damaged right elbow at first appeared to be successful, as Furcal reported for Cardinals spring training. However a bone spur began to cause discomfort prompting an MRI and examination by Cardinals team radiologist Greg Cizek on March 4, 2013, who recommended surgery. A second opinion from noted surgeon Dr. James Andrews confirmed the diagnosis on March 6, 2013. He became a free agent after the 2013 World Series on October 31, 2013.

=== Miami Marlins ===
On December 6, 2013, Furcal signed a one-year deal with the Miami Marlins. With the younger Adeiny Hechavarria at shortstop, Furcal was projected to play second base with the Marlins. He made his Marlins debut on June 13, 2014, against the Pittsburgh Pirates.

=== Kansas City Royals ===
On March 17, 2015, Furcal signed a minor league contract with the Kansas City Royals. He was released on March 31 and then re-signed the following day to another minor league contract. He played just seven games in the minors for the Wilmington Blue Rocks and Northwest Arkansas Naturals, hitting .240. On May 19, he announced his retirement.

== Personal life ==
During the offseason, Furcal played for the Aguilas Cibaeñas. He resides in Weston, FL with his family. Furcal met his wife, Glenny, during his final spring training with the Braves and the couple has two sons together, Rafael Jr. (born in 2006) and Anthony (born in 2008). Furcal also has a daughter named Ashley (born in 2004) from a previous relationship.

Furcal has used his baseball earnings to give back to his hometown. When Furcal re-signed with the Dodgers in 2008, he arranged to have the Los Angeles Fire Department donate a fire truck to Loma de Cabrera which, until then, did not have a fire department. He has also arranged to pay the hospital bills of Loma de Cabrera residents.

Furcal's father, Silvino, died on Father's Day in 2010 after being kicked by a horse on the family's farm.

Furcal was considered for election to the National Baseball Hall of Fame for the first time in 2020.

On May 15, 2025, Furcal was arrested in Broward County, Florida and charged with aggravated battery with a deadly weapon and throwing a missile into a public or private dwelling or vehicle.

== See also ==
- List of Atlanta Braves award winners and league leaders
- List of Major League Baseball annual assists leaders
- List of Major League Baseball annual triples leaders
- List of Major League Baseball career assists leaders
- List of Major League Baseball career double plays leaders
- List of Major League Baseball career games played as a shortstop leaders
- List of Major League Baseball career putouts leaders
- List of Major League Baseball career runs scored leaders
- List of Major League Baseball career stolen bases leaders
- List of Major League Baseball players from the Dominican Republic
- List of Major League Baseball postseason records
- Los Angeles Dodgers award winners and league leaders
- St. Louis Cardinals award winners and league leaders

Preceded by Carlos Beltrán	Baseball America Rookie of the Year; 2000	Succeeded by Albert Pujols
Preceded by Preston Wilson	Sporting News NL Rookie of the Year; 2000	Succeeded by Albert Pujols
Preceded by Preston Wilson	Players Choice NL Most Outstanding Rookie; 2000	Succeeded by Albert Pujols
