= Andruw Jones =

Curaçaoan baseball player (born 1977)

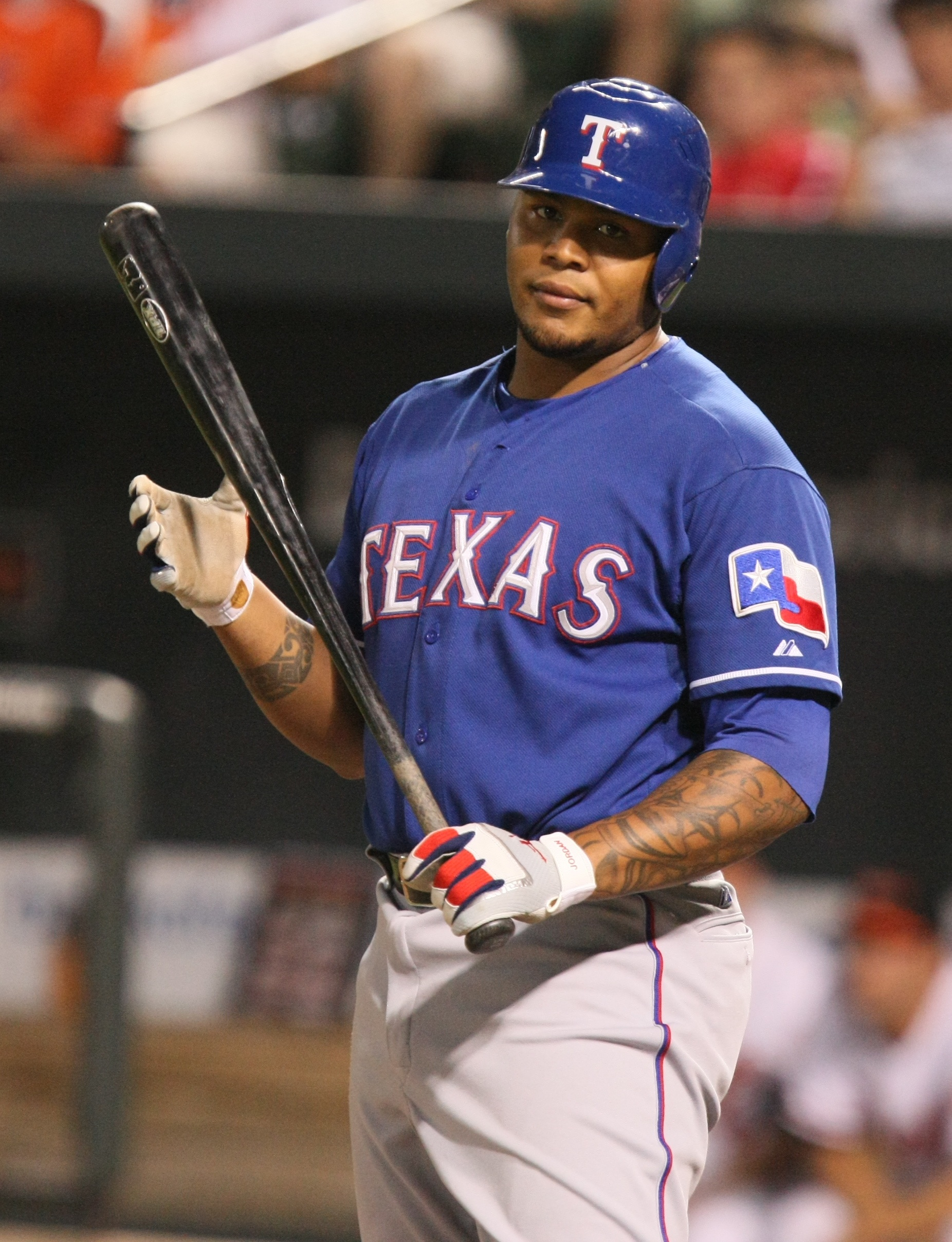
- Jones with the Texas Rangers in 2009
- Center fielder
- Born: April 23, 1977 (age 49); Willemstad, Curaçao
- Batted: Right Threw: Right

Professional debut
- MLB: August 15, 1996, for the Atlanta Braves
- NPB: March 29, 2013, for the Tohoku Rakuten Golden Eagles

Last appearance
- MLB: October 3, 2012, for the New York Yankees
- NPB: October 1, 2014, for the Tohoku Rakuten Golden Eagles

MLB statistics
- Batting average: .254
- Home runs: 434
- Runs batted in: 1,289

NPB statistics
- Batting average: .232
- Home runs: 50
- Runs batted in: 165
- Stats at Baseball Reference

Teams
- Atlanta Braves (1996–2007); Los Angeles Dodgers (2008); Texas Rangers (2009); Chicago White Sox (2010); New York Yankees (2011–2012); Tohoku Rakuten Golden Eagles (2013–2014)

Career highlights and awards
- MLB: 5× All-Star (2000, 2002, 2003, 2005, 2006); 10× Gold Glove Award (1998–2007); Silver Slugger Award (2005); NL Hank Aaron Award (2005); NL home run leader (2005); NL RBI leader (2005); Atlanta Braves No. 25 retired; Braves Hall of Fame; NPB: All-Star (2013); Japan Series champion (2013)

Member of the National

Baseball Hall of Fame
- Induction: 2026
- Vote: 78.4% (ninth ballot)

Andruw Rudolf Jones (Papiamento pronunciation: [ˈandruw ˈdʒonz]; born April 23, 1977) is a Curaçaoan former professional baseball center fielder who played 17 seasons in Major League Baseball (MLB), most notably for the Atlanta Braves. He also played for the Los Angeles Dodgers, Texas Rangers, Chicago White Sox, and New York Yankees, and in Nippon Professional Baseball (NPB) for the Tohoku Rakuten Golden Eagles. Jones was a strong defensive player for much of his career, winning the Rawlings Gold Glove Award for outfielders every year from 1998 through 2007. He had a strong throwing arm in addition to his elite fielding. He was an MLB All-Star five times, and he won both the Hank Aaron Award and a Silver Slugger Award for outfielders in 2005.

Jones made his MLB debut during the 1996 season with the Atlanta Braves. In the 1996 World Series, he became the youngest player ever to hit a home run in the postseason, and just the second player ever to homer in his first two World Series at-bats. The following season, he finished fifth in voting for Rookie of the Year. He continued to improve his offensive production the next two seasons, and in 2000, he batted .303 with 36 home runs and 104 runs batted in (RBIs), making his first All-Star team. Jones started to draw many comparisons to Willie Mays and was considered one of the top center fielders in baseball. He proved to be a top defensive player, leading all center fielders in putouts and total zone runs five years in a row from 1998 to 2002. In 2001, he again hit more than 30 home runs and drove in 104 runs but his average dipped to .251 while his strikeouts increased. Jones improved with All-Star seasons in 2002 and 2003. In 2004, he failed to hit at least 30 home runs for the first time since 1999 and exceeded 100 strikeouts, which became a regular occurrence thereafter. In 2005, he led the National League (NL) with 51 home runs and 128 RBIs, finishing second to Albert Pujols for NL Most Valuable Player. In subsequent seasons, his average continued to dip and his strikeouts increased. After a productive season in 2006, including a career-high 129 RBIs, in 2007 Jones had his weakest season to that point, batting just .222. During his time with Atlanta, Jones became one of the youngest players in MLB history to reach 300 career home runs.

After the 2007 season, Jones signed with the Dodgers as a free agent to a two-year deal, worth $36.2 million. However, Jones struggled with the Dodgers, batting just .158 with three home runs and 14 RBIs. Shortly after the season, Jones was released. Jones concluded his MLB career with brief stints for the Rangers, White Sox, and Yankees, transitioning from a starting center fielder to designated hitter and backup outfielder role. Jones hit his 400th career home run in 2010 while playing for the White Sox. In 2026, Jones was inducted into the National Baseball Hall of Fame. He became the first Curaçaoan player to be elected into the Hall of Fame.

== Early life ==
Andruw Rudolf Jones was born on April 23, 1977, in Willemstad, Curaçao. By the age of 11, Jones was on a youth select baseball team that traveled to Japan to play in a tournament. He could handle any position on the field, but because of his powerful arm, Jones often found himself at catcher or third base. He switched to the outfield a couple of years later.

== Professional career ==
=== Minor leagues ===
Jones signed with the Atlanta Braves organization as a free agent in 1993 at the age of 16. Jones was promoted to Danville of the Appalachian League after only 27 games with the Gulf Coast League Braves. Jones played for Class-A Macon in 1995. In his first at bat, he belted a homer. He finished the season with 25 home runs and 100 runs batted in. Jones also led the South Atlantic League with 56 steals. His outstanding season was capped off when he was named minor league player of the year by USA Today and Baseball America.

=== Atlanta Braves (1996–2007) ===
==== Early career ====
The Braves brought Jones up to Atlanta on August 15, 1996, when he was just 19 years old. In his first career major league game, Jones went 1-for-5 with a run batted in and a run scored. In his second game, he went 2-for-5 with a home run and a triple. He had his first multi-homer game against the Reds on August 22. He spent his early time in the majors playing in right field because established center fielder Marquis Grissom was already entrenched in the position. He finished the season batting .217 with five home runs and 13 RBIs. In the National League Championship Series against the Cardinals, Jones batted .222 with a home run and 3 RBIs. The Braves won the Series and advanced to the World Series.

In Game 1 of the 1996 World Series on October 20, Jones was able to demonstrate his talents on the national stage. He connected for two home runs to left field on his first two at bats as the Braves routed the New York Yankees 12–1. Jones became the youngest player ever to homer in the World Series at the age of 19 years, 180 days, breaking Mickey Mantle's record of 20 years, 362 days — on what would have been Mantle's 65th birthday. Jones joined Gene Tenace as the only other player to hit home runs in his first two World Series at bats. Tenace did it in 1972 with the Oakland Athletics.

Jones became the Braves' everyday right fielder in 1997. Jones hit his first home run of the season against Jeff McCurry of the Rockies. Jones had his second multi-homer game against the Cubs on July 22. On August 31, Jones went 3-for-3 with a home run and five runs batted in a game against the Boston Red Sox. Jones finished his rookie season with a .231 batting average, 18 home runs, and 70 runs batted in. Jones also showed his speed by stealing 20 bases. He finished fifth in Rookie of the Year voting. In 1998, he moved to center field nearly full-time and had a much more encouraging season. He hit his 30th home run of the season against Florida on September 13. He also won his first of ten consecutive Gold Glove Awards. In the National League Division Series, Jones went 0-for-9 but drew 3 walks. The Braves won the series against the Cubs. In the 1998 NLCS against the San Diego Padres, Jones batted .273 with a home run and two RBIs. However, The Braves lost the series in six games.

Whether he was in the batter's box or gliding under a fly ball to make an easy basket catch, Jones played the game in a very relaxed manner. This temporarily earned him the ire of manager Bobby Cox in June 1998 in an incident in which Cox pulled Jones out of a game, in the midst of an inning, because he felt Jones had lazily allowed a single to drop in center field. Jones went on to hit .271 with 31 home runs and 90 runs batted in and stole 27 bases. Still just 22 years old, Jones had similar numbers in 1999. He had a breakout season with his bat in 2000 with career highs up until that point in batting average (.303), home runs (36), and RBIs (104). He also earned his first All-Star Game appearance. He also led the National League in Plate Appearances (729) and At Bats (656). Jones struggled in the National League Division Series against the Cardinals. He went 1 for 9 with a home run. The Braves lost the series.

However, in 2001, Jones' batting average fell and his strikeouts went up. Jones finished with 34 home runs and 104 RBIs but his average dropped to only .251 and he struck out 142 times. By now, Jones had gained nearly 30 pounds since arriving in the Major Leagues, greatly diminishing his speed on the basepaths (he would not steal more than 11 bases after 2001). He maintained a similar batting performance in 2002, but was still playing superb defense. On September 7, he belted two home runs in his last two at-bats. In his first two at-bats on September 10, he belted two more home runs. He became the 11th player in MLB history to homer in four straight at-bats. Then on September 25, Jones belted three home runs against the Phillies. Jones became the first Braves player to hit three home runs in a game since Jeff Blauser did it in 1992. Jones was named to his second All Star team. He ended the season with 35 home runs and 94 RBIs.

In 2003, with the power-hitting Gary Sheffield in the line-up, Jones achieved a new career high-water mark in RBIs, with 116. Jones made his third All Star team and homered in the game. The American League beat the National League, 7–6. In the 2004 season, he took a step backward when he hit fewer than 30 homers and struck out 147 times. During the season, Jones was the subject of trade rumors.

==== 2005: NL home run and RBI leader ====
Prior to the 2005 season, Jones increased his workout regimen and followed advice given by Willie Mays to widen his batting stance. The result was his most productive offensive season ever. After Chipper Jones went down with an injury early in 2005, Jones carried the Braves. By the All Star break, Jones was leading the National League in home runs with 27. Jones was named to the All Star team, the fourth of his career. Jones hit his 40th home run of the season on August 23 in a loss against the Cubs. It marked the first time in his career that he hit at least 40 home runs in a season. Jones became the first Braves hitter to hit 40 home runs in a season since Javy Lopez did it in 2003. On September 14, 2005, Jones hit his 300th career home run which went 430 feet (130 m) off Philadelphia Phillies reliever Geoff Geary in a 12–4 Phillies win. The ball landed in the upper deck in left field at Citizens Bank Park. Jones became the first hitter since Alex Rodriguez (57) and Jim Thome (52) to hit at least 50 home runs in a season. Jones also became the 12th player in history to hit 300 home runs before his 30th birthday.

Jones hit a major league-leading 51 home runs, surpassing Hank Aaron's and Eddie Mathews' single-season club record, and winning the Babe Ruth Home Run Award. He also led the National League with a career-high 128 RBI. Jones' torrid hitting in the summer, especially while teammate Chipper Jones was out with an injury, helped carry the Braves to their 14th consecutive division championship. He finished just behind St. Louis Cardinals first baseman Albert Pujols in the 2005 NL MVP vote. In the 2005, National League Divisional Series against the Houston Astros, Jones hit .471 with a home run and five RBIs. However, the Astros took the series, 3–1.

==== Final seasons in Atlanta ====
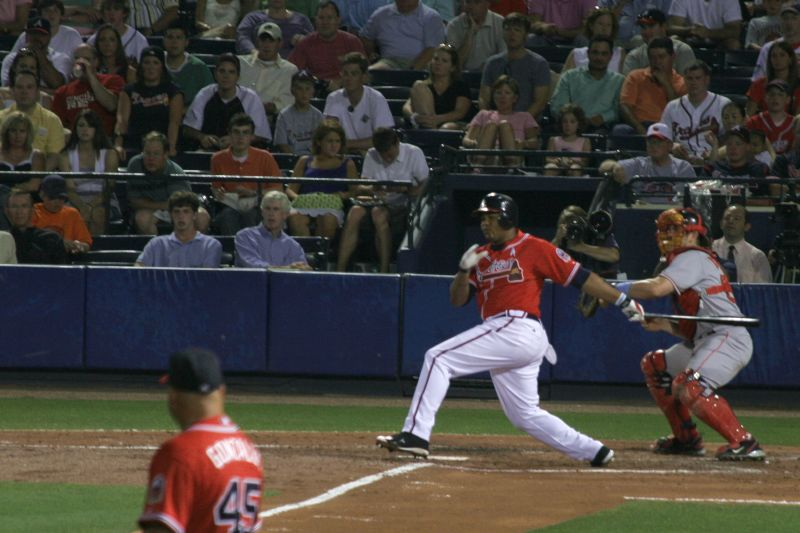
Andruw Jones at bat in 2006

Before the 2006 season, Jones played in the World Baseball Classic for the Netherlands. Jones started the season by hitting a home run off a pitch from Derek Lowe. Jones finished the game by going 2 for 4 with a home run, 4 runs batted in, a strikeout, and a base on balls. The Braves won the game, 11–10. From April 16 through April 19, Jones homered in 4 consecutive games. During that stretch, he batted .438 with 5 home runs and 8 runs batted in. Jones finished the month of April with a .281 average, 8 home runs and 23 runs batted in (RBI).

Jones matched his career high with 6 runs batted in on July 18 against the Cardinals. He also went 5 for 5 with 2 home runs. On August 29, in a game against the Giants, Jones drove in 3 runs, which gave him his 1000th career RBI. On September 26, in a game against the New York Mets, Jones hit his 40th home run of the season. He became the first hitter in Atlanta's history to have consecutive seasons of at least 40 homers. Jones finished the 2006 season with 41 home runs and 129 RBIs. Jones also became more selective at the plate (82 walks, as compared to 64 the prior season), which helped him score 107 runs during 2006, an increase of 12 over the prior year and his most in a single season since 2000. He won his ninth consecutive Gold Glove award. The Braves finished with a 79–83 record and missed the postseason for the first time since 1990.

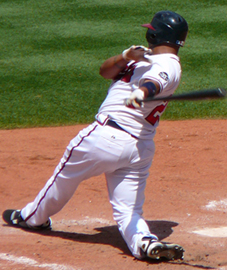
Jones at bat during his final season with the Braves in 2007

Coming into the last year of his contract with the Braves, many fans and sports analysts alike felt that 2007 would be his last year as a Brave, mostly because of his potential value on the market that the Braves would not be able to afford. Jones, however, had an unexpectedly poor start to the season, striking out 51 times in 41 games and carrying a batting average in the low .200s for the majority of April and May.

On April 30, Jones hit a three-run walk-off home run against the Philadelphia Phillies. On May 28, Jones hit his 350th career homer off Chris Capuano. After the All-Star break, Jones continued to have productive power numbers; however, his batting average remained poor. He was honored with a Fielding Bible Award as the best fielding center fielder in MLB. Jones finished the 2007 season with 26 home runs and 94 RBIs. On the downside, Jones hit only .222 and struck out 138 times.

On October 2, the Braves announced they would not be bringing Jones back for the 2008 season.

=== Los Angeles Dodgers (2008) ===
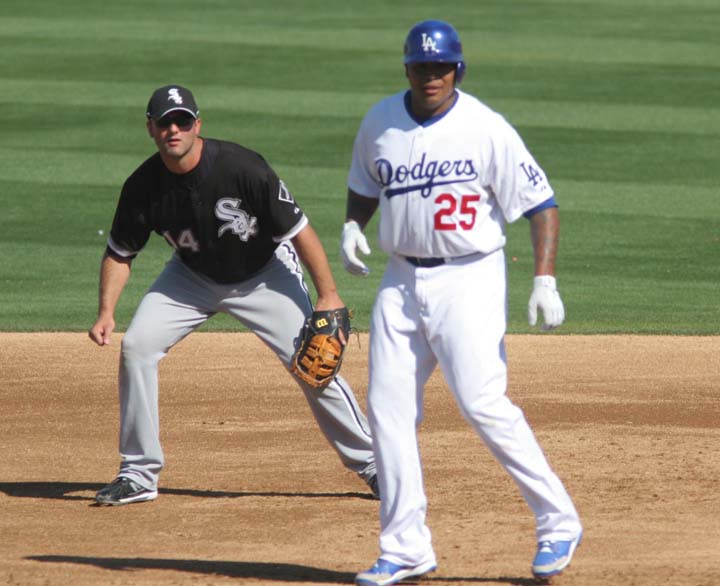
Jones (25) with White Sox first baseman Paul Konerko during spring training action, 2008

On December 5, 2007, Jones agreed to a two-year deal with the Los Angeles Dodgers, worth $36.2 million. After showing up to spring training out of shape and overweight, he continued to struggle, hitting below .200 for most of the season. Additionally, he had only 10 hits in 116 at-bats with runners in scoring position. Due to his lack of production, Jones was dropped to eighth in the Dodger lineup. This was the first time since 1998 that Jones had hit eighth in any lineup.

Jones was put on the disabled list for the first time in his entire career on May 25, 2008. He had knee surgery after injuring his knee during batting practice earlier that day. On July 27, Dodgers manager Joe Torre benched Jones and said that he would only be used as a spot starter in the future. At that time, Jones had a .166 batting average, two home runs, 12 RBIs, and 68 strikeouts in 187 at-bats.

On September 13, 2008, Jones was put on the 60-day disabled list, ending his season with the Dodgers. Jones finished the season with a .158 batting average, just three home runs, and 14 RBI. Jones stated that he did not wish to return to the Dodgers in 2009, saying that the Los Angeles fans did not give him a fair chance.

During the off-season, the Dodgers reached an agreement with Jones to trade or release him before spring training in exchange for a deferral of some of the remaining money due on his contract. On January 15, 2009, Jones was officially released by the Dodgers.

=== Texas Rangers (2009) ===
On February 8, 2009, Jones signed a one-year minor league contract with the Texas Rangers; the deal paid him $500,000 for making the major league team, and offered $1 million in incentives. Jones reportedly turned down a similar offer from the New York Yankees to compete for their center field job and expressed an interest in staying with the Rangers even though he would likely not be a starter. He earned the Rangers' final roster spot.

He was originally intended to be a pinch-hitter for the Rangers, but found a starting outfield role due to an injury to Josh Hamilton. Jones would go 3-for-5 in his Rangers debut with an RBI and two runs scored. By the end of April, Jones was batting .344 with three home runs and six runs batted in.

Jones was also faced with an opportunity to play against his old club, the Dodgers. Jones played two games against them on June 13 and 14, homering in each game. On July 4, Jones went 2 for 5 with a home run and 4 runs batted in against the Rays. On July 8, in a game against the Angels, Jones hit three home runs and drove in four runs in an 8–1 win. It was his second career three-homer game. Jones had a chance to hit his fourth home run of the game in his final two at-bats, but he popped out and struck out. "I was thinking about it. I tried. I just didn't get it done," Jones said. "I'm just happy we won." Jones ultimately hit only .214 for the season, but did have 17 home runs in 82 games.

=== Chicago White Sox (2010) ===
On November 25, 2009, Jones signed a $500,000 deal for 2010 with up to an additional $1 million in performance bonuses. Unlike what he had done with the Braves and Dodgers in previous seasons, Jones showed up to camp in shape, a full 30 pounds under his previous weight. On April 23, 2010, Jones hit two home runs on his 33rd birthday, including a walk-off to help the White Sox win 7–6 over the Seattle Mariners. On July 11, he hit his 400th career home run.

He finished the year with nineteen home runs in 278 at-bats. He scored 41 runs, had 48 RBI and 64 base hits in 107 games, the most games he appeared in since 2007.

=== New York Yankees (2011–2012) ===
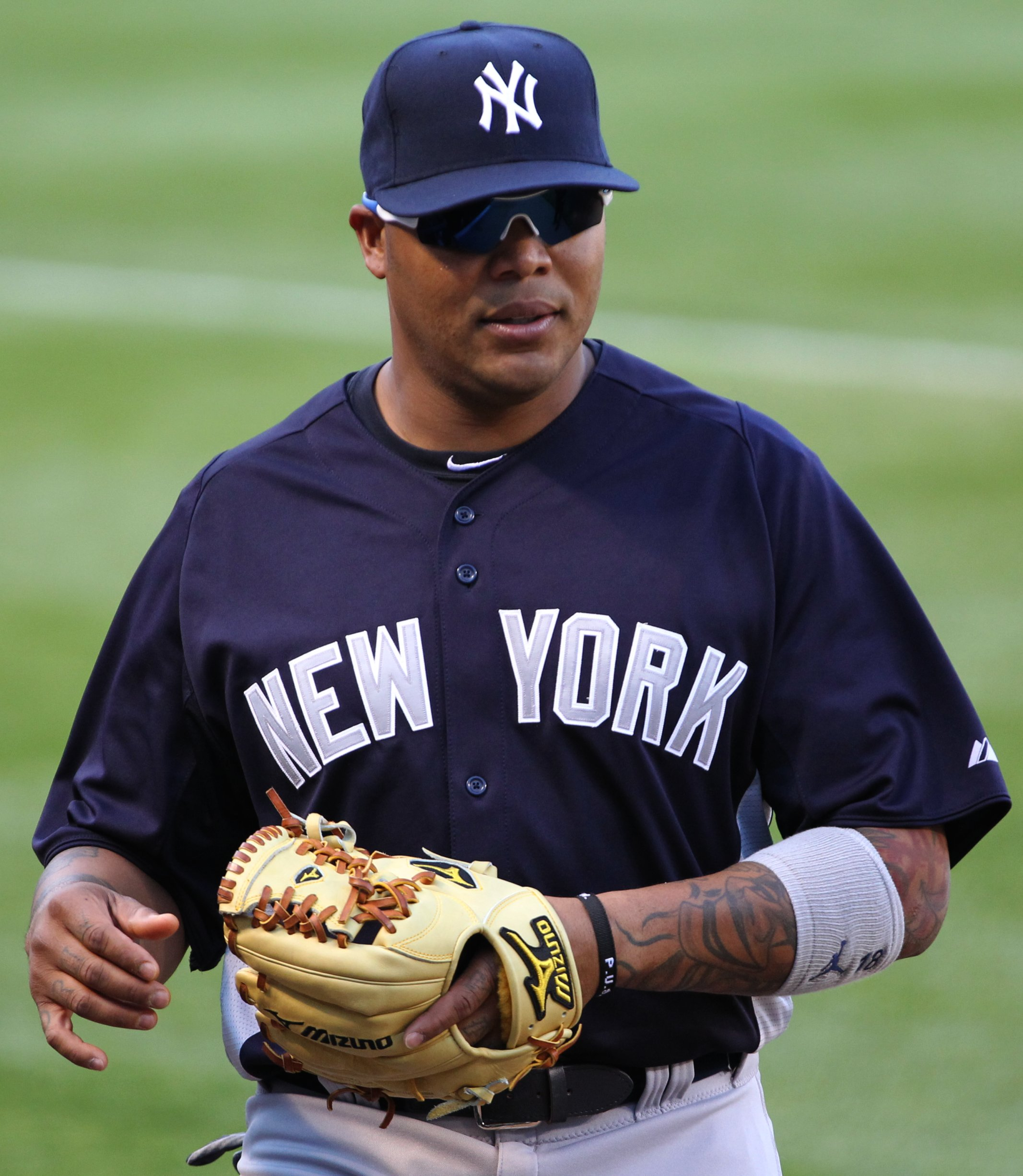
Jones with the Yankees in 2011

On January 20, 2011, Jones and the New York Yankees agreed to a contract for the 2011 season for $2 million, with an additional $1.2 million in performance bonuses. In his first Yankees at-bat on April 5, he hit a home run over the left field wall at Yankee Stadium off the Minnesota Twins' Brian Duensing. Jones finished the season with a .247 average, 13 home runs and 33 runs batted in. He became a free agent after the season.

Jones re-signed with the Yankees on December 30, 2011, signing a one-year deal worth $2 million. He was slated to be a backup in 2012. However, due to Brett Gardner's DL stint, Jones received more starts than anticipated. Jones played very well in the first half of the season, hitting 12 home runs in his first 62 games, including three over the course of a doubleheader in Boston, but in August and September, he hit only .139 with two home runs over his final 32 games.

=== Tohoku Rakuten Golden Eagles (2013–2014) ===
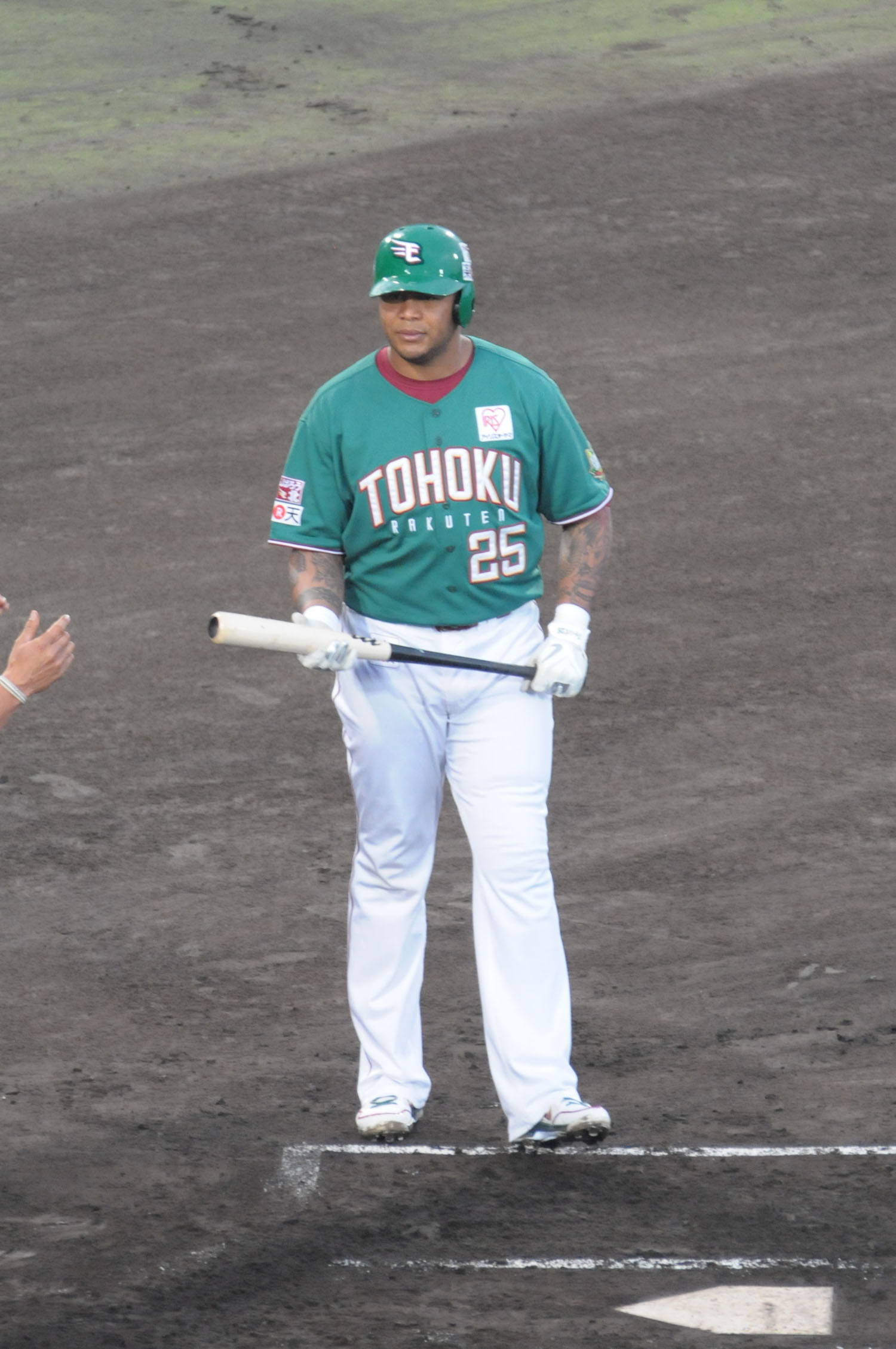
Jones with the Tohoku Rakuten Golden Eagles

On December 7, 2012, Jones agreed to a one-year, ¥300 million (approximately $3.5 million) contract with the Tohoku Rakuten Golden Eagles of Nippon Professional Baseball. He finished the regular season with 26 home runs in 478 at-bats. He scored 81 runs, had 94 RBI, 116 base hits and 105 walks in 143 games, helping Eagles to clinch their first Pacific League Championship. His steady performance continued in postseason, including two home runs in the Pacific League Climax Series and one in the Japan Series respectively, which played a key role in the Eagles' Japan Series win. After the season, Jones re-signed with Rakuten for the 2014 season, agreeing to a one-year contract worth ¥400 million (approximately $3.8 million). In his two years with Rakuten, Jones hit 50 home runs and played primarily at designated hitter, however he played 48 games at first base, far more than the eight he played in his career before coming to Japan.

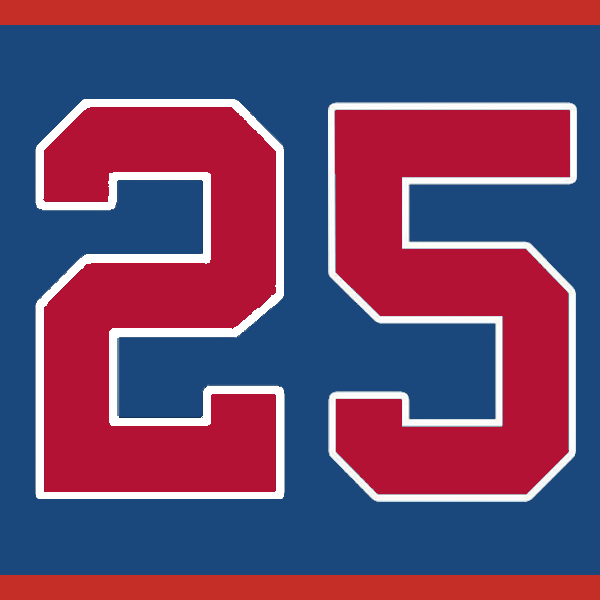
Andruw Jones's number 25 was retired by the Atlanta Braves in 2023.

=== Retirement ===
After playing in Japan, Jones attempted comebacks in both the 2015 and 2016 MLB seasons. He officially retired from baseball in February 2016 and was hired by the Braves as a special assistant later that month. On April 3, 2023, the Braves announced that Jones's number 25 would be retired by the team on September 9.

== Career summary ==
Jones ended his career with a .254/.337/.486 slash line, along with 434 home runs and 1,289 runs batted in. His home run total was tied for 40th on the all-time home run list when he ended his career. However, Jones' weakness was hitting against breaking balls and hitting for good average. Only once in his career did Jones bat .300 or better (he batted .303 in 2000), and he hit just .214 in the final six seasons of his career.

Jones was also known for his speed early in his career. In fact, his speed earned him the last playoff spot on the Braves' roster in 1996. Jones stole 20 or more bases from 1997 to 2000. However, his speed declined as he hit for more power. Jones never stole 10 bases after he stole 11 in 2001. This could also be attributed to a noticeable weight gain.

Jones also owned the lowest batting average (since broken by Jose Bautista in 2010), slugging percentage, on-base percentage (OBP), and runs scored in a season for a hitter that belted 50+ home runs in a season. Jones hit 51 in 2005 but batted just .263, with a .575 slugging percentage, .347 OBP, and 95 runs scored.

From 1998 to 2007, Jones won 10 consecutive Gold Gloves. His 10 Gold Gloves for an outfielder ranks him in a tie for third (behind Willie Mays and Roberto Clemente each with 12) with Al Kaline, Ichiro Suzuki, and Ken Griffey Jr. for most Gold Gloves won by an outfielder. Jones is also one of five center fielders to record at least 400 putouts in a season six times; the others are Willie Mays, Richie Ashburn, Kirby Puckett, and Max Carey. Jones has been ranked by Fangraphs as the most valuable defensive outfielder in baseball history.

== International career ==
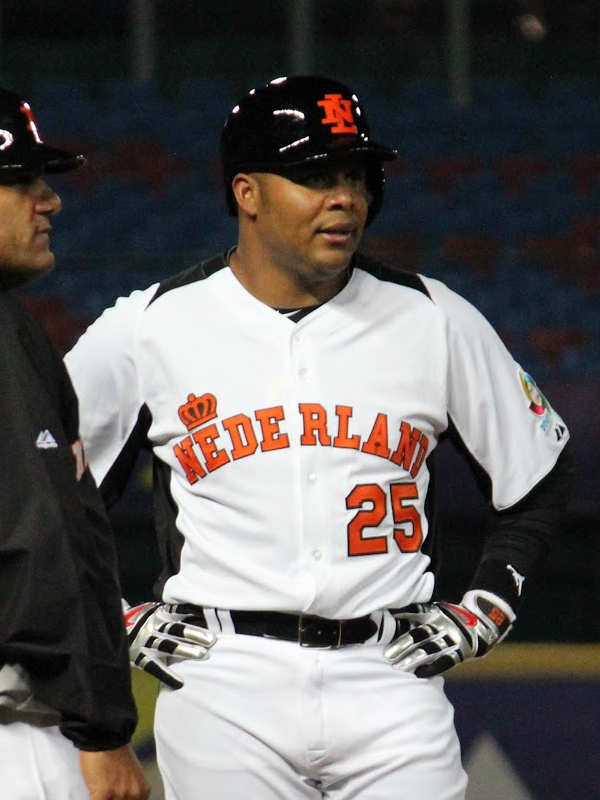
Jones playing for the Netherlands in the 2013 World Baseball Classic

Being born in Curaçao, then part of the Netherlands Antilles, Jones represented the Netherlands national baseball team in international competition. During the inaugural World Baseball Classic (WBC) in 2006, Jones went hitless in six at-bats, with two walks and two strikeouts. Jones returned to the team for the 2013 WBC. His 2013 was much more successful, as he slashed .333/.441/.370 with nine hits and five walks, leading the team in OBP.

Two years later, in 2015, Jones was selected to play with the national team as a first baseman for the 2015 Premier12. Over five games, he hit .250, with four hits and two RBI. Jones later announced that those were his final games as a player.

Jones was named the manager of the Netherlands national team for the 2026 World Baseball Classic, which took place in Miami in March 2026.

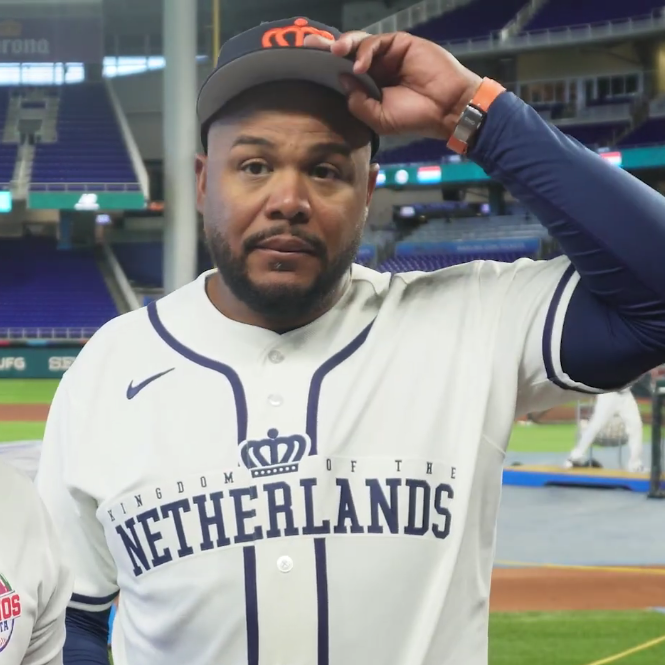
Jones as manager of the Netherlands during the 2026 World Baseball Classic

== Personal life ==
In July 2001, Jones testified in the federal trial of Steve Kaplan, an Atlanta club owner charged with facilitating prostitution. Jones testified that he was a regular at the club and that, on one occasion, Kaplan arranged for a limousine to bring him to a hotel where he had sex with a group of people. He further testified that he made no payment during the encounter because Kaplan had told him that it was a party.

Jones married Nicole Derick. They are the parents of one son and one daughter. Son Druw was a top prospect in the 2022 MLB draft and was selected second overall by the Arizona Diamondbacks.

Early on the morning of Christmas, December 25, 2012, Jones was arrested for battery after police officers responded to a domestic disturbance call between him and his wife Nicole in Duluth, Georgia, near Atlanta. A police report said Jones allegedly put his hands around her neck and threatened to kill her. He was released on $2,400 bond late that morning. Nicole Jones filed for divorce in early January 2013. His wife later withdrew the action for divorce and the couple attempted to reconcile, though Jones eventually pleaded guilty, paid a fine, and was placed on probation.

Jones and his wife supported Jaden's Ladder, a nonprofit organization that assists survivors of domestic violence.

== Awards and accomplishments ==
- Minor League Player of the Year Award (1995 and 1996)
- Youngest player in the National League (1996 and 1997)
- 10-Time NL Gold Glove Award Winner (1998–2007)
- 5-Time All-Star (2000, 2002–03, 2005–06)
- Inaugural National League All-Star Final Vote winner (2002)
- Led the majors with 51 home runs in 2005
- Held Braves record for most home runs in a season (2005, with 51) until surpassed by Matt Olson in 2023
- Led the National League with 656 at-bats in 2000
- Led the National League with 128 RBIs in 2005
- NL Silver Slugger Award in 2005
- NL Hank Aaron Award as the league's best offensive player in 2005
- NL Player of the Month for June and August 2005
- Major League Player of the Year for 2005, as chosen by the Major League Baseball Players Association
- Fielding Bible Award at center field (2007)
- Number retired by the Atlanta Braves on September 9, 2023

Jones has appeared on balloting for the National Baseball Hall of Fame since 2018, when he received 7.3% of the vote, well short of the 75% required for election, but above the 5% minimum required to remain on the ballot. His support has increased to 33.9% as of the 2021 Hall of Fame ballot, his fourth appearance. His support grew even stronger on the 2022 ballot, reaching up to 41.4% in his 5th year of eligibility and later 58.1% in his 6th year of eligibility in the 2023 ballot and 61.6% in 2024 and 66.2% in 2025. In 2026, in his 9th year of eligibility, Jones was elected to the National Baseball Hall of Fame by securing 78.4% of the vote, surpassing the 75% required for induction.

Jones was inducted into the Atlanta Braves Hall of Fame in 2016. His uniform number, 25, was retired by the team on September 9, 2023.

== See also ==
- List of Atlanta Braves award winners and league leaders
- List of Major League Baseball annual home run leaders
- List of Major League Baseball annual runs batted in leaders
- List of Major League Baseball career assists leaders
- List of Major League Baseball career double plays leaders
- List of Major League Baseball career extra base hits leaders
- List of Major League Baseball career games played as a center fielder leaders
- List of Major League Baseball career games played as an outfielder leaders
- List of Major League Baseball career home run leaders
- List of Major League Baseball career putouts leaders
- List of Major League Baseball career runs batted in leaders
- List of Major League Baseball career runs scored leaders
- List of Major League Baseball career strikeouts by batters leaders
- List of Major League Baseball career WAR leaders
- List of Major League Baseball players from the Netherlands Antilles

| Preceded by Bobby Abreu; Adam Dunn | National League Player of the Month; June 2005; August 2005 | Succeeded by Adam Dunn; Randy Winn |
