= List of Major League Baseball career games played as a shortstop leaders =

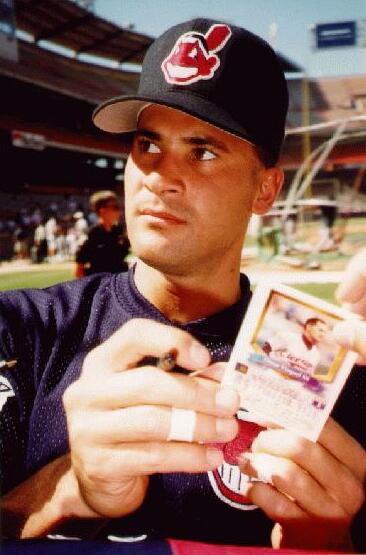
Omar Vizquel, the all-time leader in games played as a shortstop.

Games played (most often abbreviated as G or GP) is a statistic used in team sports to indicate the total number of games in which a player has participated (in any capacity); the statistic is generally applied irrespective of whatever portion of the game is contested. In baseball, the statistic applies also to players who, prior to a game, are included on a starting lineup card or are announced as ex ante substitutes, whether or not they play; however, in Major League Baseball, the application of this statistic does not extend to consecutive games played streaks. A starting pitcher, then, may be credited with a game played even if he is not credited with a game started or an inning pitched. Shortstop, abbreviated SS, is a baseball or softball fielding position in the infield, commonly stationed between second and third base, which is considered to be among the most demanding defensive positions. The position is mostly filled by defensive specialists, so shortstops are generally relatively poor batters who typically hit lower in the batting order. In the numbering system used to record defensive plays, the shortstop is assigned the number 6.

Although there have been players with long careers at shortstop throughout major league history, they were more rare until the 1950s as expectations for their offensive contributions gradually increased. When batting expectations were lower, shortstops could be more easily replaced as their defensive ability declined by players with roughly equivalent hitting capability. 21 of the top 27 players in career games at shortstop made their major league debuts after 1950. Omar Vizquel is the all-time leader in games played as a shortstop, having played 2,709 games at the position in his career. 19 players in major league history have played over 2,000 career games at shortstop, the second most of all positions behind only first basemen.

== Key ==
**Rank**	Rank amongst leaders in career games played. A blank field indicates a tie.
**Player (2026 Gs)**	Number of games played during the 2026 Major League Baseball season
**MLB**	Total career games played as a shortstop in Major League Baseball
*	Denotes elected to National Baseball Hall of Fame
**Bold**	Denotes active player (Note: A player is considered inactive if he has announced his retirement or not played for a full season.)

== List ==
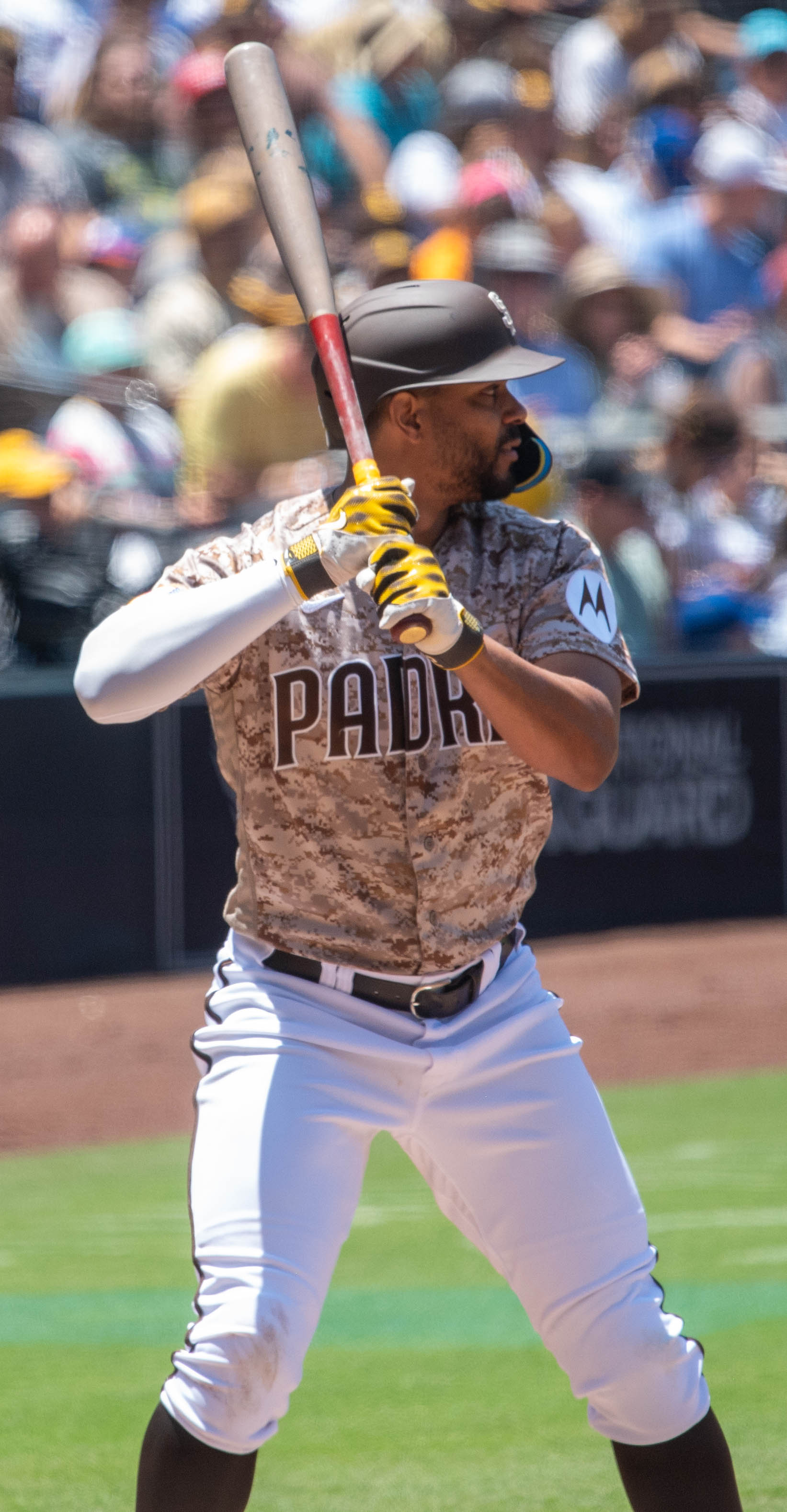
Xander Bogaerts, the active leader and 48th all-time in games played as a shortstop.

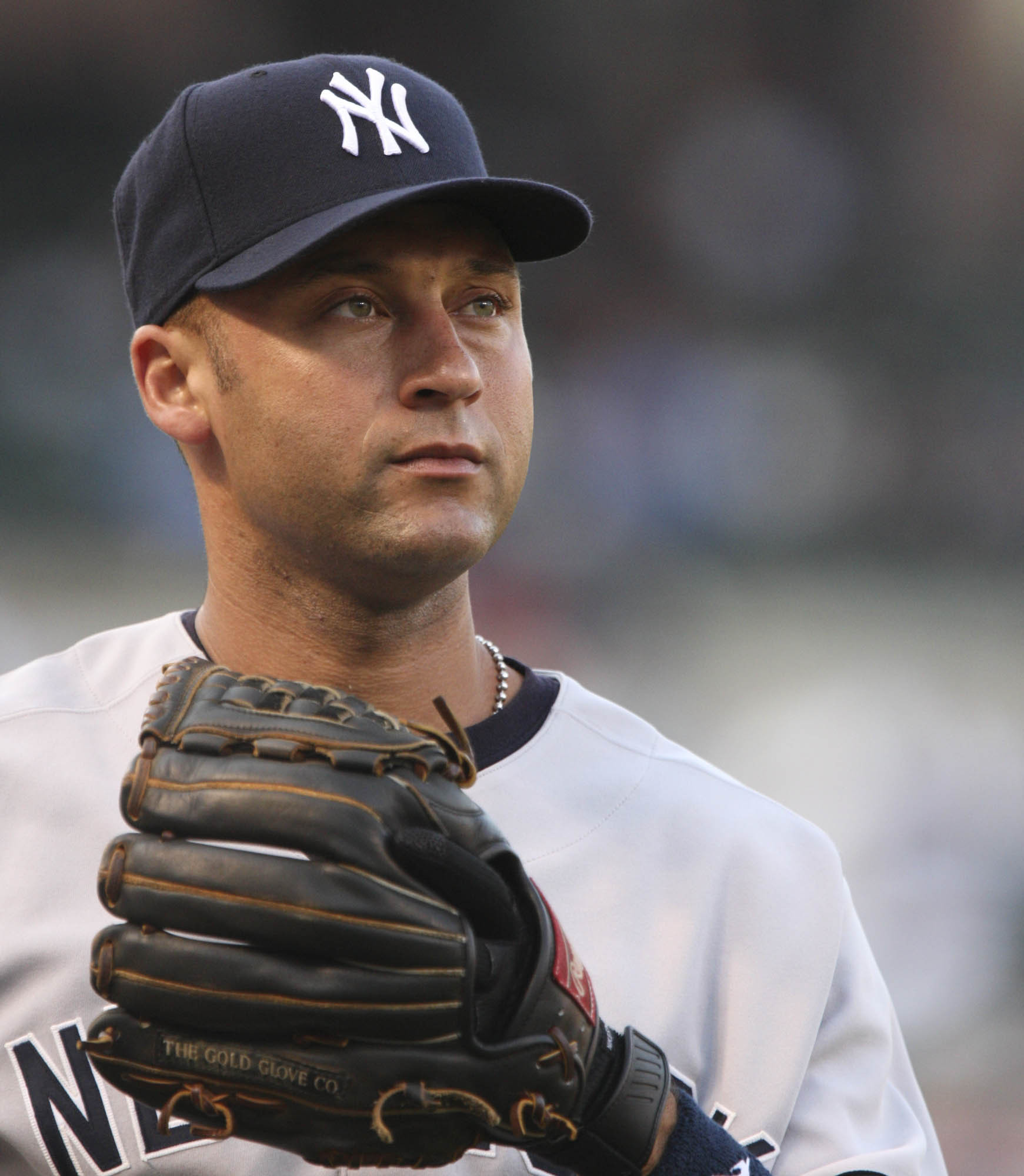
Derek Jeter holds the American League record.

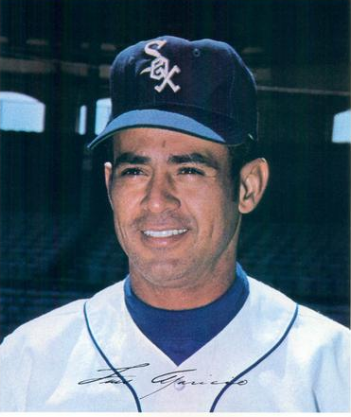
Luis Aparicio held the major league record for 38 years.

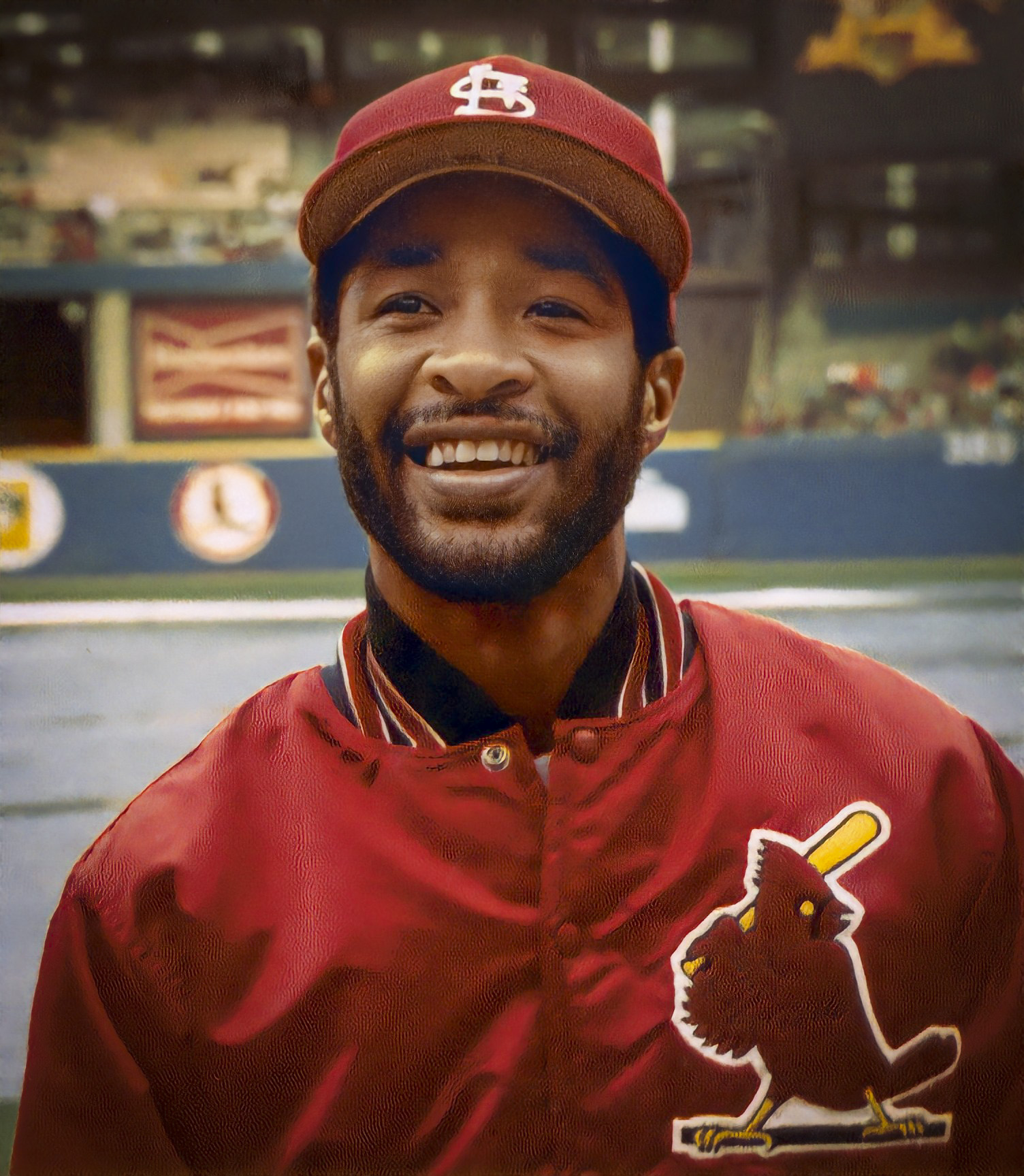
Ozzie Smith holds the National League record.

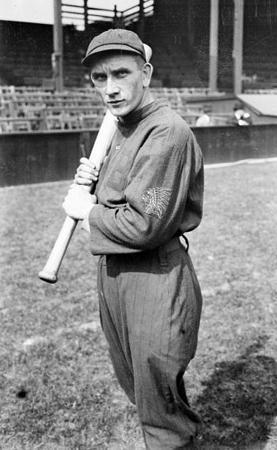
Rabbit Maranville held the National League record for 54 years.

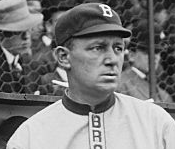
Bill Dahlen held the major league record for 23 years.

- Stats updated as of September 27, 2026.

Rank	Player (2026 Gs)	Games as shortstop			Other leagues, notes
Rank	Player (2026 Gs)	MLB	American League	National League	Other leagues, notes
1	Omar Vizquel	2,709	2,180	529	
2	Derek Jeter*	2,674	2,674	0	
3	Luis Aparicio*	2,581	2,581	0	Held major league record, 1970-2008; held American League record, 1970-2014
4	Ozzie Smith*	2,511	0	2,511	
5	Cal Ripken Jr.*	2,302	2,302	0	
6	Jimmy Rollins	2,227	35	2,192	
7	Larry Bowa	2,222	0	2,222	Held National League record, 1985-1993
8	Luke Appling*	2,218	2,218	0	Held major league record, 1949-1970; held American League record, 1947-1970
9	Dave Concepción	2,178	0	2,178	
10	Rabbit Maranville*	2,153	0	2,153	Held major league record, 1931-1949; held National League record, 1931-1985
11	Alan Trammell*	2,139	2,139	0	
12	Bill Dahlen	2,133	0	2,133	Held major league record, 1908-1931; held National League record, 1907-1931
13	Édgar Rentería	2,114	291	1,823	
14	Bert Campaneris	2,097	2,097	0	
15	Barry Larkin*	2,085	0	2,085	
16	Tommy Corcoran	2,078	0	1,819	Includes 133 in American Association, 126 in Players' League; held major league record, 1904-1908; held National League record, 1905-1907
17	Royce Clayton	2,053	644	1,409	
18	Roy McMillan	2,028	0	2,028	
19	Pee Wee Reese*	2,014	0	2,014	
20	Roger Peckinpaugh	1,982	1,982	0	Held American League record, 1926-1947
21	Elvis Andrus	1,966	1,966	0	
22	Garry Templeton	1,964	0	1,964	
23	Don Kessinger	1,955	198	1,757	
24	Miguel Tejada	1,946	1,531	415	
25	Mark Belanger	1,942	1,898	44	
26	Chris Speier	1,900	12	1,888	
27	Ozzie Guillén	1,896	1,772	124	
28	Honus Wagner*	1,887	0	1,887	
29	Dick Groat	1,877	0	1,877	
30	Dave Bancroft*	1,873	0	1,873	
31	Donie Bush	1,866	1,866	0	Held American League record, 1918-1926
32	Alfredo Griffin	1,861	1,389	472	
33	Orlando Cabrera	1,843	824	1,019	
	Leo Cárdenas	1,843	705	1,138	
	Joe Cronin*	1,843	1,832	11	
36	Bobby Wallace*	1,826	1,452	374	Held American League record, 1910-1918
37	Ed Brinkman	1,795	1,771	24	
	Herman Long	1,795	60	1,607	Includes 128 in American Association; held major league record, 1902-1904; held National League record, 1902-1905
39	Greg Gagne	1,765	1,495	270	
40	Bill Russell	1,746	0	1,746	
41	Joe Tinker*	1,745	0	1,604	Includes 141 in Federal League
42	Dick Bartell	1,679	144	1,535	
43	Monte Cross	1,678	712	966	
44	Germany Smith	1,667	0	1,105	Includes 537 in American Association, 25 in Union Association; held major league record, 1898-1902
45	Phil Rizzuto*	1,647	1,647	0	
46	Everett Scott	1,643	1,639	4	
47	Brandon Crawford	1,635	0	1,635	
48	**Xander Bogaerts (151)**	1,634	1,192	442	
49	Jack Glasscock	1,629	0	1,593	Includes 36 in Union Association; held major league record, 1887-1898; held National League record, 1885-1902
50	George McBride	1,627	1,449	178	
	José Reyes	1,627	303	1,324	
52	Mickey Doolin	1,625	0	1,337	Includes 288 in Federal League
53	**Francisco Lindor (103)**	1,616	763	853	
54	Freddie Patek	1,588	1,325	263	
55	Mike Bordick	1,577	1,521	56	
56	Tony Fernández	1,573	1,217	356	
57	Ed McKean	1,565	0	1,364	Includes 201 in American Association
58	Maury Wills	1,555	0	1,555	
59	Rafael Furcal	1,554	0	1,554	
60	Álex González	1,548	249	1,299	
61	Marty Marion	1,547	63	1,484	
62	J.J. Hardy	1,544	987	557	
63	Billy Jurges	1,540	0	1,540	
64	Lou Boudreau*	1,539	1,539	0	
65	Tim Foli	1,524	241	1,283	
66	Frankie Crosetti	1,516	1,516	0	
67	Jay Bell	1,515	259	1,256	
68	Leo Durocher*	1,509	122	1,387	
69	Arky Vaughan*	1,485	0	1,485	
70	Alcides Escobar	1,484	1,209	275	
71	Robin Yount*	1,479	1,479	0	
72	Walt Weiss	1,462	522	940	
73	Jhonny Peralta	1,459	1,152	307	
74	Art Fletcher	1,448	0	1,448	
75	Wally Gerber	1,447	1,409	38	
76	Alvin Dark	1,404	0	1,404	
77	Bud Harrelson	1,400	87	1,313	
78	**Dansby Swanson (124)**	1,399	0	1,399	
79	Jim Fregosi	1,396	1,373	23	
80	Eddie Miller	1,395	0	1,395	
81	Rafael Ramírez	1,386	0	1,386	
81	Bucky Dent	1,382	1,382	0	
83	Johnny Logan	1,380	0	1,380	
84	George Davis*	1,374	716	658	
85	Spike Owen	1,373	834	539	
86	Shawon Dunston	1,363	14	1,349	
87	Dick Schofield	1,348	1,204	144	
88	Erick Aybar	1,337	1,145	192	
89	Vern Stephens	1,330	1,330	0	
90	Travis Jackson*	1,326	0	1,326	
91	Iván DeJesús	1,303	14	1,289	
92	Eddie Joost	1,299	927	372	
93	Cristian Guzmán	1,295	836	459	
94	Jack Wilson	1,274	104	1,170	
95	Alex Rodriguez	1,272	1,272	0	
96	Troy Tulowitzki	1,268	235	1,033	
97	**Trea Turner (154)**	1,265	0	1,265	
	Zoilo Versalles	1,265	1,122	143	
99	Alex Gonzalez	1,262	886	376	
100	Chico Carrasquel	1,241	1,241	0	

== Other Hall of Famers ==
Player	Games as shortstop			Other leagues, notes
Player	MLB	American League	National League	Other leagues, notes
Joe Sewell*	1,216	1,216	0	
Ernie Banks*	1,125	0	1,125	
Willie Wells*	965	0	0	Includes 607 in Negro National League (first), 315 in Negro National League (second), 39 in East–West League, 4 in Negro American League (incomplete)
Hughie Jennings*	897	1	828	Includes 68 in American Association
John Montgomery Ward*	826	0	698	Includes 128 in Players' League
George Wright*	530	0	269	Includes 261 in National Association; held major league record, 1875-1882; held National League record, 1876-1877
Rogers Hornsby*	356	0	356	
John McGraw*	183	0	162	Includes 21 in American Association
John Henry Lloyd*	137	0	0	Includes 90 in Negro National League (first), 47 in Eastern Colored League (incomplete)
Martín Dihigo*	110	0	0	Includes 71 in Eastern Colored League, 36 in American Negro League, 3 in Negro National League (second) (incomplete)
Ed Delahanty*	94	0	18	Includes 76 in the Players' League
King Kelly*	90	0	62	Includes 27 in the Players' League, 1 in American Association
Tony Lazzeri*	87	62	25	
Ray Dandridge*	34	0	0	Includes 34 in Negro National League (second) (incomplete)
Jackie Robinson*	34	0	1	Includes 33 in Negro American League (incomplete)
Adrián Beltré*	7	0	7	
Dick Allen*	3	0	3	
Jeff Kent*	3	0	3	
