= Sidney Ponson =

Aruban baseball player (born 1976)

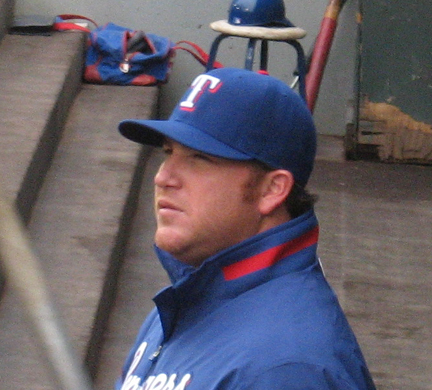
- Ponson with the Texas Rangers
- Pitcher
- Born: November 2, 1976 (age 49); Noord, Aruba
- Batted: Right Threw: Right

MLB debut
- April 19, 1998, for the Baltimore Orioles

Last MLB appearance
- July 31, 2009, for the Kansas City Royals

MLB statistics
- Win–loss record: 91–113
- Earned run average: 5.03
- Strikeouts: 1,031
- Stats at Baseball Reference

Teams
- Baltimore Orioles (1998–2003); San Francisco Giants (2003); Baltimore Orioles (2004–2005); St. Louis Cardinals (2006); New York Yankees (2006); Minnesota Twins (2007); Texas Rangers (2008); New York Yankees (2008); Kansas City Royals (2009)

Sidney Alton Ponson (Papiamento pronunciation: [ˈsidni ponˈsoŋ]; born November 2, 1976) is an Aruban former Major League Baseball pitcher. As a player, Ponson stood at 6 ft 1 in (1.85 m) tall and weighed 260 lb (120 kg). He threw right-handed with a fastball that clocked out at 95 mph. When he made his major league debut for the Baltimore Orioles in 1998, he became the third player from Aruba to play in the major leagues. In 2003, he was decorated as a Knight in the Order of Orange-Nassau, along with fellow Aruban former Baltimore Orioles players Eugene Kingsale and Calvin Maduro.

== Baltimore Orioles ==
Ponson played most of his career with the Baltimore Orioles. His best season came in 2003 when he went 14–6 with a 3.77 ERA. Because Baltimore was not in contention for a playoff spot and Ponson was in the last year of his contract, the Orioles traded Ponson that season to the San Francisco Giants at the trading deadline for three players: Kurt Ainsworth, Damian Moss, and prospect Ryan Hannaman. That offseason, Ponson returned to the Orioles on a three-year, $22.5 million deal.

In 2004, Ponson was the opening day starter for Baltimore. He allowed one run on seven hits in 5 2/3 innings pitched while striking out three and walking three in the Orioles' 7–2 win over the Boston Red Sox. However, he started off disastrously; his record was 3–12 by the All-Star Break. He rebounded for a strong second half, going 8–3 to finish with an 11–15 record and a 5.30 ERA.

=== Three arrests (2004–2005) ===
On December 25, 2004, Ponson was arrested in Aruba and charged with assaulting an Aruban judge following an incident about a complaint of Ponson's handling of his powerboat. He spent 11 days in jail, but the charges were dropped after he reached a settlement that included restitution, community service, and contributions to local charities on the island.

Less than a month later, in January 2005, he was charged with driving under the influence in Broward County, Florida. Because of these activities, it was thought that he would not be able to enter Canada to pitch in a series against the Toronto Blue Jays in May 2005. However, a visa was later granted, and he was able to make his scheduled start.

Early in the morning of August 25, 2005, Ponson was arrested again for driving under the influence and driving while impaired on southbound Interstate 95 near downtown Baltimore. He was stopped for following too closely and was subsequently arrested by Maryland Transportation Authority Police for the traffic violation and DWI. He was later released.

=== Release ===
Just before the second drunk driving incident, Baltimore attempted to trade Ponson to the San Diego Padres for first baseman Phil Nevin at the 2005 trade deadline, but the deal fell through when Nevin invoked his no-trade clause. Nevin eventually was traded to the Texas Rangers. On September 1, the Orioles released Ponson and voided his contract, saying that his infractions with the law went against a morals clause in Major League Baseball (MLB) contracts. A week later, on September 8, the MLB Association filed a grievance on Ponson's behalf. The Orioles settled the grievance in 2009, with the Orioles reportedly agreeing to pay the remaining $10.1 million on Ponson's contract.

== St. Louis Cardinals ==
On December 21, 2005, Ponson signed a one-year contract with the St. Louis Cardinals calling for a $1 million salary with the ability to earn an additional $1.5 million in incentives. Although his season started promisingly, Ponson struggled with stamina and rarely went more than five innings in his starts. On July 7, 2006, the Cardinals designated Ponson for assignment, ending his stint with the team.

== New York Yankees ==
On July 14, 2006, Ponson signed with the New York Yankees. The Yankees won his first game, lost the second game, and he was subsequently sent to the bullpen when the Yankees acquired Cory Lidle from the Philadelphia Phillies. Reportedly, general manager Brian Cashman asked Ponson if he would be amenable to being a reliever before going ahead with the trade, which also involved the Yankees acquiring Bobby Abreu. If Ponson had refused, he would have been released and the trade that sent Shawn Chacón to the Pittsburgh Pirates for Craig Wilson would have fallen through. After a poor pitching performance on August 18, 2006, the Yankees released Ponson, making him a free agent.

== Minnesota Twins ==
In January 2007, Ponson signed a minor league contract with the Minnesota Twins. On March 31, 2007, his contract was purchased by the Twins and he was added to their 25-man roster as the fifth starter. He got off to a poor start, having only a couple of quality starts while his ERA hovered around 7. On May 13, the Twins designated him for assignment, and he was later released.

== Texas Rangers ==
On March 9, 2008, Ponson signed a minor league contract with an invitation to spring training with the Texas Rangers. Ponson began the 2008 season with the Triple-A Oklahoma RedHawks. On April 26, the Rangers purchased his contract, and he became the team's third starter.

Ponson compiled a fairly solid 4–1 record and 3.88 ERA for the season and was one of the few bright spots on a dreadful rotation. However, he ran into trouble off the field. He was seen late at night in the hotel bar in St. Petersburg, Florida while the Rangers were visiting Tampa Bay. The next day, the Rays lit him up for 12 hits in five innings. Rangers officials told Ponson that any further incident would result in him being dropped from the team.

He was pulled four innings into a June 4 game against Cleveland, and reacted angrily, especially since three errors led to four runs. The next day, he blew up at manager Ron Washington after being told he'd be pushed back from his next start to keep Kevin Millwood on his regular schedule.

On June 6, Texas abruptly designated Ponson for assignment for what general manager Jon Daniels called "disrespectful and adverse reactions to situations unbecoming of a teammate." Daniels added, "We don't feel Sidney deserves to be here or wants to be here. We're not going to get into details other than to say we're clearly trying to put together a team here, in a true sense of the word. Based on some recent comments and other such things, it was pretty clear that he did not want to be part of that, and it's something we're not going to tolerate."

== New York Yankees (second stint) ==
On June 9, 2008, Ponson signed a minor league deal returning to the Yankees for a second time. He made his first start on June 27 in a Subway Series against the Mets. Ponson pitched six shutout innings in his first start back with the Yankees, which they eventually won 9–0. His record with the 2008 Yankees was 4–4 with a 5.85 ERA. He had the highest run support of all major league pitchers that season, an average of 6.5 runs per start.

== World Baseball Classic ==
Ponson pitched for the Netherlands in the 2009 World Baseball Classic. Ponson would finish with an ERA of 4.00 in nine innings pitched over two appearances, earning the win for the Dutch in their shocking opening win over the heavily favored Dominican Republic. He was, however, the losing pitcher in the Dutch's second-round defeat to Venezuela. On June 26, 2009, it was announced that he violated the IBAF/World Anti-Doping Agency doping regulation during the tournament by taking phentermine and was banned from international baseball tournament for two years. MLB did not ban him, but he was subject to a fine and review as a first-time offender.

== Kansas City Royals ==
On March 17, 2009, two days after Netherlands' elimination from the World Baseball Classic, Ponson signed a minor league deal to play for the Kansas City Royals and was invited to spring training. On April 1, it was announced that Ponson would start Kansas City's home opener on April 10, 2009 against the New York Yankees. He pitched six innings, and gave up four earned runs for the loss. He made his second start for the Royals on April 15, in which he allowed only two runs in six innings. Ponson got a no decision in the 5–4 loss to the Cleveland Indians. After a record of 1–7 with an ERA of 7.36, he was designated for assignment by the Royals on August 2, and released August 12.

== Long Island Ducks ==
On April 12, 2010, Ponson signed with the Long Island Ducks of the Atlantic League of Professional Baseball. He made 11 starts throwing 67 innings going 4-5 with a 5.64 ERA and 29 strikeouts. He became a free agent following the season.

== Personal life ==
Ponson's cousin is fellow Aruban pitcher Radhames Dykhoff, who pitched in one game for the Orioles in 1998. Both Ponson and Dykhoff were signed by Orioles scout Jesus “Chu” Halabi.
