= Radhames Dykhoff =

Aruban baseball player (born 1974)

- Pitcher
- Born: September 27, 1974 (age 51); Paradera, Aruba
- Batted: Left Threw: Left

MLB debut
- June 7, 1998, for the Baltimore Orioles

Last MLB appearance
- June 7, 1998, for the Baltimore Orioles

MLB statistics
- Win–loss record: 0–0
- Earned run average: 18.00
- Strikeouts: 1
- Stats at Baseball Reference

Teams
- Baltimore Orioles (1998)

Radhames Alviro Dykhoff (born September 27, 1974) is an Aruban former Major League Baseball pitcher. He appeared in one game for the Baltimore Orioles in 1998. Dykhoff was listed as being 6 ft 1 in (1.85 m), with a listed playing weight of 210 lb (95 kg).

== Career ==
Dykhoff was originally signed to his first contract as an amateur free agent by the Baltimore Orioles on January 6, 1993, by scout Jesus "Chu" Halabi.. His cousin, Sidney Ponson, signed with the Orioles a few months later.

After pitching in the Orioles' minor league system for a few years, he made it to the big leagues for a brief stint with the Baltimore Orioles in 1998. On June 7 of that year, Radhames became the fourth Aruban to appear in the major leagues. A southpaw, Radhames lasted just one inning, giving up two hits, a walk, while striking a single batter out. He allowed two earned runs, giving him a gaudy career earned run average of 18.00, and wore the number 28 on his jersey.

After his brief major league stint, Dykhoff returned to the minors. He continued to play in the Orioles system until being claimed on waivers by the New York Mets on April 6, 2000. During the 2000 season, he appeared in a combined 49 games for the Mets' Double–A affiliate (Binghamton Mets) and Triple–A affiliate (Norfolk Tides), but was not called up to the major league squad. In 2001, he pitched for the Arkansas Travelers in the Los Angeles Angels of Anaheim farm system to finish his professional career.

He is, to date, the only one of the five Aruban MLB players not to have been knighted in his native land.
