= Horizon League men's basketball tournament =

College tournament in Indiana, U.S.

- Sport: College basketball
- Conference: Horizon League
- Number of teams: 11 (2026)
- Format: Single-elimination tournament
- Current stadium: Campus sites (first round); Riverview Health Arena at Innovation Mile (second round, semifinals, and championship)
- Current location: Noblesville, Indiana
- Played: 1980–present
- Last contest: 2026
- Current champion: Wright State (4)
- Most championships: Butler Bulldogs (7)
- TV partner(s): ESPN, ESPN2, ESPNU, and ESPN+
- Official website: Official website

Host stadiums
- Roberts Municipal Stadium (1980–1983); Campus locations (1981, 2003–2015, 2019–present); Frederickson Fieldhouse (1981); Riverfront Coliseum (1981, 1992); Mabee Center (1982, 1985); UIC Pavilion (1984, 1999–2000); Market Square Arena (1986–1988, 1993); University of Dayton Arena (1989–1991); Hinkle Fieldhouse (1994, 2004, 2008–2010); Nutter Center (1995–1997, 2001, 2007, 2014); Brown County Veterans Memorial Arena (1998); CSU Convocation Center (2002); U.S. Cellular Arena (2003–2006, 2011); Athletics–Recreation Center (2012–2013, 2015); Resch Center (2014); Joe Louis Arena (2016–2017)/Little Caesars Arena (2018–2019); Indiana Farmers/Corteva Coliseum (2020–2026); Riverview Health Arena at Innovation Mile (2027–future)

The Horizon League men's basketball conference tournament is held annually at the end of the men's college basketball regular season. The tournament has been played each year since 1980. The winner of the tournament is designated the Horizon League tournament champion and receives the conference's automatic bid to the NCAA men's basketball tournament. The finals of the tournament are typically among the first held before the field for the NCAA tournament is announced.

== History and tournament format ==
Through 2002, the entire tournament was hosted at a single venue. From 2003 through 2015, all first-round matches were played at the home court of the higher-seeded team involved. Hosting rights for the quarterfinals and semifinals were awarded to the winner of the regular season championship. The championship game was played at the home arena of the higher remaining seed. This format rewarded the regular-season champion and runner-up with a double-bye into the semifinals. The regular-season champion received the added benefit of home-court advantage in the semifinals, plus a home-court final if it won its semifinal.

Beginning in 2009, the Horizon League secured an entitlement sponsorship of its men's and women's basketball tournaments with Speedway SuperAmerica, a major gas and convenience store chain throughout the midwest United States, officially changing the name of the tournaments to "The Speedway Horizon League Men's/Women's Basketball Championship".

From 2016 to 2019, the Horizon League tournament was held in Detroit under a five-year deal, beginning at Joe Louis Arena, adding the women's tournament in 2017 (with both events marketed under the title Motor City Madness), and moving to the newly opened Little Caesars Arena beginning in 2018.

However, the contract with Detroit was ended a year early; the league reopened bidding for the men's and women's tournaments in 2018, with the new contract taking effect with the 2019–20 season. On January 25, 2019, the conference announced that Indianapolis would host the men's and women's semifinals and final from 2020 to 2022, with Indiana Farmers Coliseum, now known as Corteva Coliseum, as the venue. In 2022, the deal was extended through 2026.

On August 20, 2025, the Horizon League announced a new format for the 2026 tournament. Instead of a traditional eleven-team single elimination bracket, the new format included reseeding after each round. The event started on campus sites with a play-in round for the bottom two teams (by conference record), followed by a ten-team first round. The five remaining teams then advanced to the final three rounds held at Corteva Coliseum. The bottom two teams by seeding played in the second round, while the other three teams were forwarded into the semifinals, with those winners advancing to the final.

On March 12, 2026, the Horizon League announced that the men's and women's tournaments would move their final three rounds to Riverview Health Arena at Innovation Mile in Noblesville, Indiana, beginning in 2027, with the contract extending through 2031.

== Horizon League Tournament results ==
Year	Champion	Seed	Score	Runner-up	Seed	Tournament MVP	Location
1980	Oral Roberts	2	103–93	Loyola	1	Calvin Garrett, Oral Roberts	Roberts Municipal Stadium – Evansville, IN
1981	Oklahoma City	2	82–76	Xavier	1	Anthony Hicks, Xavier	Opening round: campus locations Semifinals: Frederickson Fieldhouse – Oklahoma City, OK; Championship: Riverfront Coliseum – Cincinnati, OH
1982	Evansville	1	81–72	Loyola	3	Brad Leaf, Evansville	Mabee Center – Tulsa, OK
1983	Xavier	2	82–76	Loyola	1	Alfredrick Hughes, Loyola	Roberts Municipal Stadium – Evansville, IN
1984	Oral Roberts	1	82–76	Xavier	3	Sam Potter, Oral Roberts	UIC Pavilion – Chicago, IL
1985	Loyola	1	89–83	Oral Roberts	3	Alfredrick Hughes, Loyola	Mabee Center – Tulsa, OK
1986	Xavier	1	74–66	Saint Louis	2	Byron Larkin, Xavier	Market Square Arena – Indianapolis, IN
1987	Xavier	3	81–69	Saint Louis	4	Byron Larkin, Xavier	Market Square Arena – Indianapolis, IN
1988	Xavier	1	122–96	Detroit Mercy	6	Byron Larkin, Xavier	Market Square Arena – Indianapolis, IN
1989	Xavier	3	85–78	Evansville	1	Tyrone Hill, Xavier	University of Dayton Arena – Dayton, OH
1990	Dayton	2	98–89	Xavier	1	Negele Knight, Dayton	University of Dayton Arena – Dayton, OH
1991	Xavier	1	81–68	Saint Louis	3	Jamie Gladden, Xavier	University of Dayton Arena – Dayton, OH
1992	Evansville	2	95–76	Butler	3	Parrish Casebier, Evansville	Riverfront Coliseum – Cincinnati, OH
1993	Evansville	2	80–69	Xavier	1	Parrish Casebier, Evansville	Market Square Arena – Indianapolis, IN
1994	Detroit Mercy	4	72–63	Evansville	2	Andy Elkins, Evansville	Hinkle Fieldhouse – Indianapolis, IN
1995	Green Bay	3	73–59	Wright State	8	Jeff Nordgaard, Green Bay	Nutter Center – Dayton, OH
1996	Northern Illinois	3	84–63	Detroit Mercy	5	Chris Coleman, Northern Illinois	Nutter Center – Dayton, OH
1997	Butler	1	69–68	UIC	3	Kelsey Wilson, Butler	Nutter Center – Dayton, OH
1998	Butler	3	70–51	Green Bay	4	Jon Neuhouser, Butler	Brown County Veterans Memorial Arena – Green Bay, WI
1999	Detroit Mercy	1	72–65	Butler	2	Rashad Phillips, Detroit	UIC Pavilion – Chicago, IL
2000	Butler	1	62–43	Detroit Mercy	3	Mike Marshall, Butler	UIC Pavilion – Chicago, IL
2001	Butler	1	53–38	Detroit Mercy	2	LaVall Jordan, Butler	Nutter Center – Dayton, OH
2002	UIC	6	76–75 (OT)	Loyola	5	Cedrick Banks, UIC	CSU Convocation Center – Cleveland, OH
2003	Milwaukee	2	69–52	Butler	1	Clay Tucker, Milwaukee	Opening round: campus locations Quarterfinals onwards: U.S. Cellular Arena – Milwaukee, WI
2004	UIC	2	65–62	Milwaukee	1	Armond Williams, UIC	Opening round: campus locations Quarterfinals, Semifinals: Hinkle Fieldhouse – Indianapolis, IN; Championship: U.S. Cellular Arena – Milwaukee, WI
2005	Milwaukee	1	59–58	Detroit Mercy	3	Joah Tucker, Milwaukee	Opening round: campus locations Quarterfinals onwards: U.S. Cellular Arena – Milwaukee, WI
2006	Milwaukee	1	87–71	Butler	2	Adrian Tigert, Milwaukee	Opening round: campus locations Quarterfinals onwards: U.S. Cellular Arena – Milwaukee, WI
2007	Wright State	1	60–55	Butler	2	DaShaun Wood, Wright State	Opening round: campus locations Quarterfinals onwards: Nutter Center – Dayton, OH
2008	Butler	1	70–55	Cleveland State	2	Mike Green, Butler	Opening round: campus locations Quarterfinals onwards: Hinkle Fieldhouse – Indianapolis, IN
2009	Cleveland State	3	57–54	Butler	1	Cedric Jackson, Cleveland State	Opening round: campus locations Quarterfinals onwards: Hinkle Fieldhouse – Indianapolis, IN
2010	Butler	1	70–45	Wright State	2	Matt Howard, Butler	Opening round: campus locations Quarterfinals onwards: Hinkle Fieldhouse – Indianapolis, IN
2011	Butler	2	59–44	Milwaukee	1	Matt Howard, Butler	Opening round: campus locations Quarterfinals onwards: U.S. Cellular Arena – Milwaukee, WI
2012	Detroit Mercy	3	70–50	Valparaiso	1	Ray McCallum Jr., Detroit	Opening round: campus locations Quarterfinals onwards: Athletics–Recreation Center – Valparaiso, IN
2013	Valparaiso	1	62–54	Wright State	3	Erik Buggs, Valparaiso	Opening round: campus locations Quarterfinals onwards: Athletics–Recreation Center – Valparaiso, IN
2014	Milwaukee	5	69–63	Wright State	3	Jordan Aaron, Milwaukee	Opening round: campus locations Quarterfinals, Semifinals: Resch Center – Green Bay, WI; Championship: Nutter Center – Dayton, OH
2015	Valparaiso	1	54–44	Green Bay	2	Alec Peters, Valparaiso	Opening round: campus locations Quarterfinals onwards: Athletics–Recreation Center – Valparaiso, IN
2016	Green Bay	4	78–69	Wright State	3	Jordan Fouse, Green Bay	Joe Louis Arena – Detroit, MI
2017	Northern Kentucky	4	59–53	Milwaukee	10	Lavone Holland II, Northern Kentucky	Joe Louis Arena – Detroit, MI
2018	Wright State	2	74–57	Cleveland State	8	Grant Benzinger, Wright State	Little Caesars Arena – Detroit, MI
2019	Northern Kentucky	2	77–66	Wright State	1	Drew McDonald, Northern Kentucky	Opening round: campus locations Semifinals, Championship: Little Caesars Arena – Detroit, MI
2020	Northern Kentucky	2	71–62	UIC	4	Jalen Tate, Northern Kentucky	Opening round: campus locations Semifinals, Championship: Indiana Farmers Coliseum/Corteva Coliseum – Indianapolis, IN
2021	Cleveland State	1	80–69	Oakland	3	Torrey Patton, Cleveland State	Opening round: campus locations Semifinals, Championship: Indiana Farmers Coliseum/Corteva Coliseum – Indianapolis, IN
2022	Wright State	4	72–71	Northern Kentucky	3	Grant Basile, Wright State	Opening round: campus locations Semifinals, Championship: Indiana Farmers Coliseum/Corteva Coliseum – Indianapolis, IN
2023	Northern Kentucky	4	63–61	Cleveland State	3	Marques Warrick, Northern Kentucky	Opening round: campus locations Semifinals, Championship: Indiana Farmers Coliseum/Corteva Coliseum – Indianapolis, IN
2024	Oakland	1	83–76	Milwaukee	6	Trey Townsend, Oakland	Opening round: campus locations Semifinals, Championship: Indiana Farmers Coliseum/Corteva Coliseum – Indianapolis, IN
2025	Robert Morris	1	89–78	Youngstown State	4	Kam Woods, Robert Morris	Opening round: campus locations Semifinals, Championship: Indiana Farmers Coliseum/Corteva Coliseum – Indianapolis, IN
2026	Wright State	1	66–63	Detroit Mercy	3	TJ Burch, Wright State	Play-in and first round: campus locations Second round onwards: Corteva Coliseum – Indianapolis, IN
2027							First round: campus locations Second round onwards: Riverview Health Arena at Innovation Mile – Noblesville, IN

== Horizon League tournament champions ==
**School**	**Championships**	**Championship**; **Years**
Butler	7	1997, 1998, 2000, 2001, 2008, 2010, 2011
Xavier	6	1983, 1986, 1987, 1988, 1989, 1991
**Milwaukee**	**4**	**2003, 2005, 2006, 2014**
**Northern Kentucky**	**4**	**2017, 2019, 2020, 2023**
**Wright State**	**4**	**2007, 2018, 2022, 2026**
Evansville	3	1982, 1992, 1993
**Detroit Mercy**	**3**	**1994, 1999, 2012**
Oral Roberts	2	1980, 1984
UIC	2	2002, 2004
Valparaiso	2	2013, 2015
**Green Bay**	**2**	**1995, 2016**
**Cleveland State**	**2**	**2009, 2021**
Oklahoma City	1	1981
Loyola Chicago	1	1985
Dayton	1	1990
Northern Illinois	1	1996
**Oakland**	**1**	**2024**
**Robert Morris**	**1**	**2025**
Duquesne	0	
**IU Indy**	**0**	
La Salle	0	
Marquette	0	
**Purdue Fort Wayne**	**0**	
Saint Louis	0	
**Youngstown State**	**0**	

Notes

- Current conference members in **bold**.
- Future conference member in italics.

== Horizon League Tournament all-time standings ==
=== Current members ===
Through 2026 tournament finals

School	Record	Winning Percentage	Championships
Detroit	40–42	.488	3
Wright State	33–28	.541	4
Green Bay	25–30	.455	2
Milwaukee	29–25	.537	4
Northern Illinois	5–2	.714	1
Cleveland State	25–28	.472	2
Northern Kentucky	18–7	.720	4
Oakland	12–12	.500	1
Youngstown State	11–25	.306	0
Purdue Fort Wayne	3–6	.333	0
Robert Morris	6–5	.545	1
IU Indy	0–9	.000	0

=== Former members ===
School	Record	Winning Percentage	Championships
Butler	31–26	.544	7
Loyola	25–34	.424	1
Xavier	24–10	.706	6
UIC	24–26	.480	2
Evansville	15–12	.556	3
Valparaiso	10–8	.571	2
Oral Roberts	7–6	.538	2
Saint Louis	7–8	.467	0
Dayton	5–4	.556	1
Oklahoma City	5–4	.556	1
Duquesne	1–1	.500	0
Marquette	0–2	.000	0
La Salle	0–3	.000	0

== Postseason appearances ==
Horizon League members past and present have made several Sweet 16, Elite Eight, and Final Four appearances. Charter member Loyola also won the 1963 NCAA tournament.

=== Current tournaments ===
Season	NCAA Tournament		National Invitation Tournament		College Basketball Invitational	
Season	Team (seed)	Finish	Team (seed)	Finish	Team (seed)	Finish
1980			Loyola	First round	**Tournament** **not** **held**	
1981					**Tournament** **not** **held**	
1982	Evansville (10)	First round	Oral Roberts	First round	**Tournament** **not** **held**	
1983	Xavier (12)	Preliminary round			**Tournament** **not** **held**	
1984	Oral Roberts (11)	First round	Xavier	Quarterfinals	**Tournament** **not** **held**	
1985	Loyola (4)	Sweet 16	Butler	First round	**Tournament** **not** **held**	
1986	Xavier (12)	First round			**Tournament** **not** **held**	
1987	Xavier (13)	Second round	St. Louis	Second round	**Tournament** **not** **held**	
1988	Xavier (11)	First round	Evansville	First round	**Tournament** **not** **held**	
1989	Evansville (11)	Second round	St. Louis	Runner-Up	**Tournament** **not** **held**	
1989	Xavier (14)	Second round	St. Louis	Runner-Up	**Tournament** **not** **held**	
1990	Xavier (6)	Sweet 16	St. Louis	Runner-Up	**Tournament** **not** **held**	
1990	Dayton (12)	Second round	Marquette	First round	**Tournament** **not** **held**	
1991	Xavier (14)	Second round	Butler	First round	**Tournament** **not** **held**	
1992	Evansville (8)	First round	Butler	First round	**Tournament** **not** **held**	
1993	Xavier (9)	Second round			**Tournament** **not** **held**	
1993	Evansville (14)	First round			**Tournament** **not** **held**	
1994			Xavier	Quarterfinals	**Tournament** **not** **held**	
1994			Evansville	First round	**Tournament** **not** **held**	
1995	Green Bay (14)	First round			**Tournament** **not** **held**	
1995	Xavier (11)	First round			**Tournament** **not** **held**	
1996	Green Bay (8)	First round			**Tournament** **not** **held**	
1996	Northern Illinois (14)	First round			**Tournament** **not** **held**	
1997	Butler (14)	First round			**Tournament** **not** **held**	
1998	UIC (9)	First round			**Tournament** **not** **held**	
1998	Detroit (10)	Second round			**Tournament** **not** **held**	
1998	Butler (13)	First round			**Tournament** **not** **held**	
1999	Detroit (12)	First round	Butler	Quarterfinals	**Tournament** **not** **held**	
2000	Butler (12)	First round			**Tournament** **not** **held**	
2001	Butler (10)	First round	Detroit	Semifinals	**Tournament** **not** **held**	
2002	UIC (15)	First round	Butler	Second round	**Tournament** **not** **held**	
2002	UIC (15)	First round	Detroit	First round	**Tournament** **not** **held**	
2003	Butler (12)	Sweet 16	UIC	First round	**Tournament** **not** **held**	
2003	Milwaukee (12)	First round	UIC	First round	**Tournament** **not** **held**	
2004	UIC (13)	First round	Milwaukee	First round	**Tournament** **not** **held**	
2005	Milwaukee (12)	Sweet 16			**Tournament** **not** **held**	
2006	Milwaukee (11)	Second round	Butler (8)	First round	**Tournament** **not** **held**	
2007	Butler (5)	Sweet 16			**Tournament** **not** **held**	
2007	Wright State (14)	First round			**Tournament** **not** **held**	
2008	Butler (7)	Second round	Cleveland State (6)	First round	Valparaiso (4)	Second round
2009	Butler (9)	First round			Green Bay (2)	First round
2009	Cleveland State (13)	Second round			Green Bay (2)	First round
2010	Butler (5)	Nat'l Runner-Up			Green Bay (3)	Second round
2011	Butler (8)	Nat'l Runner-Up	Cleveland State (2)	Second round		
2011	Butler (8)	Nat'l Runner-Up	Milwaukee (5)	First round		
2012	Detroit (15)	First round	Cleveland State (6)	First round	Butler	Semifinals
2012	Detroit (15)	First round	Valparaiso (7)	First round	Milwaukee	First round
2013	Valparaiso (14)	First round	Detroit (6)	First round	Wright State	Semifinals
2014	Milwaukee (15)	First round	Green Bay (4)	First round		
2015	Valparaiso (13)	First round	Green Bay (5)	First round		
2016	Green Bay (14)	First round	Valparaiso (1)	Runner-Up		
2017	Northern Kentucky (15)	First round	Oakland (7)	Second round	Green Bay	First round
2017	Northern Kentucky (15)	First round	Valparaiso (7)	First round	UIC	First round
2018	Wright State (13)	First round	Northern Kentucky (7)	First round		
2019	Northern Kentucky (14)	First round	Wright State (7)	First round		
2020	Canceled due to the COVID-19 pandemic					
2021	Cleveland State (15)	First round				
2022	Wright State (16)	First round	Cleveland State (7)	First round	Purdue Fort Wayne (16)	First round
2023	Northern Kentucky (16)	First round	Youngstown State (8)	First round	Cleveland State (9)	First round
2023	Northern Kentucky (16)	First round	Youngstown State (8)	First round	Milwaukee (11)	Quarterfinals
2024	Oakland (14)	Second round			Cleveland State (9)	Quarterfinals
2025	Robert Morris (15)	First round			Cleveland State	Runner-up
2026	Wright State (14)	First round				

=== Defunct tournaments ===
Season	CollegeInsider.com Postseason Tournament		Vegas 16		The Basketball Classic	
Season	Team	Finish	Team	Finish	Team	Finish
2009			**Tournament** **not** **held**		**Tournament** **not** **held**	
2010			**Tournament** **not** **held**		**Tournament** **not** **held**	
2011	Valparaiso	First round	**Tournament** **not** **held**		**Tournament** **not** **held**	
2012			**Tournament** **not** **held**		**Tournament** **not** **held**	
2013	Youngstown State	Second round	**Tournament** **not** **held**		**Tournament** **not** **held**	
2013	UIC	Second round	**Tournament** **not** **held**		**Tournament** **not** **held**	
2013	Green Bay	First round	**Tournament** **not** **held**		**Tournament** **not** **held**	
2014	Valparaiso	First round	**Tournament** **not** **held**		**Tournament** **not** **held**	
2014	Wright State	Second round	**Tournament** **not** **held**		**Tournament** **not** **held**	
2014	Cleveland State	First round	**Tournament** **not** **held**		**Tournament** **not** **held**	
2015	Cleveland State	Second round	**Tournament** **not** **held**		**Tournament** **not** **held**	
2015	Oakland	First round	**Tournament** **not** **held**		**Tournament** **not** **held**	
2016			Oakland	Runner-Up	**Tournament** **not** **held**	
2017			**Tournament** **not** **held**		**Tournament** **not** **held**	
2018	UIC	Runner-Up	**Tournament** **not** **held**		**Tournament** **not** **held**	
2019	Green Bay	Runner-Up	**Tournament** **not** **held**		**Tournament** **not** **held**	
2020	**Tournament** **not** **held**		**Tournament** **not** **held**		**Tournament** **not** **held**	
2021	**Tournament** **not** **held**		**Tournament** **not** **held**		**Tournament** **not** **held**	
2022	**Tournament** **not** **held**		**Tournament** **not** **held**		Detroit Mercy	First round
2022	**Tournament** **not** **held**		**Tournament** **not** **held**		Youngstown State	Quarterfinals

== Broadcasters ==
=== Television ===
Year	Network	Play-by-play	Analyst
2026	ESPN	Jordan Bernfield	Randolph Childress
2025	ESPN	Jordan Bernfield	David Padgett
2024	ESPN	Jordan Bernfield	David Padgett
2023	ESPN	Jordan Bernfield	Mark Adams
2022	ESPN	Bob Wischusen	Mark Adams
2021	ESPN	Jason Benetti	Chris Spatola
2020	ESPN	Jason Benetti	Dan Dakich
2019	ESPN	Rich Hollenberg	Fran Fraschilla
2018	ESPN	Rich Hollenberg	Fran Fraschilla
2017	ESPN	Bob Wischusen	Fran Fraschilla
2016	ESPN	Mike Tirico	Dan Dakich
2015	ESPN	Bob Wischusen	Jim Calhoun
2014	ESPN	Bob Wischusen	Malcolm Huckaby
2013	ESPN	Bob Wischusen	Stephen Bardo
2012	ESPN	Mark Jones	Stephen Bardo
2011	ESPN	Bob Wischusen	Stephen Bardo
2010	ESPN	Jon Sciambi	LaPhonso Ellis
2009	ESPN	Ron Franklin	Fran Fraschilla
2008	ESPN	Terry Gannon	Stephen Bardo
2007	ESPN	Terry Gannon	Stephen Bardo
2006	ESPN	Dave Barnett	Tim McCormick, Jason Williams
2005	ESPN	Dave Strader	Stephen Bardo
2004	ESPN	Dave Revsine	Bob Valvano
2003	ESPN	Dave Revsine	Bob Valvano
2002	ESPN	Dan Shulman	Jon Albright
2001	ESPN	Derrin Horton	Jimmy Dykes
2000	ESPN		
1999	ESPN	Dewayne Staats	Leo Rautins
1998	ESPN	Dewayne Staats	Larry Conley
1997	ESPN		
1996	ESPN	John Walls	Larry Conley
1995	ESPN		
1994	ESPN	Jim Durham	Larry Conley
1993	ESPN	Bob Carpenter	Paul Sunderland
1992	ESPN	Dave Woloshin	Jim Spanarkel
1991	ESPN	Jack Corrigan	Chris Piper
1990	ESPN	Jack Corrigan	Steve Grote
1989	ESPN	Gary Sparber	Mike Pratt
1988	ESPN		
1987	ESPN		
1986	ESPN	Andy McWilliams	Dick Vitale

=== Radio ===
Year	Network	Play-by-play	Analyst
2013	Westwood One	Wayne Larrivee	Will Perdue
2012	Westwood One	Dave Ryan	Pete Gillen
2011	Westwood One	Wayne Larrivee	Pete Gillen
2010	Westwood One	Wayne Larrivee	Pete Gillen
2009	Westwood One	Mark Champion	Pete Gillen

== See also ==
- List of Horizon League champions
