= 2008–09 Horizon League men's basketball season =

Season of an American college basketball league

- League: NCAA Division I
- Sport: Basketball
- Duration: December 4, 2008 through February 28, 2009
- Teams: 10
- TV partner(s): Fox Sports Midwest, ESPN, CBS Sports, Horizon League Network

Regular Season
- Champions: Butler Bulldogs
- Coach of the Year: Brad Stevens, Butler
- Runners-up: Green Bay Phoenix
- Season MVP: Matt Howard, Butler

Tournament
- Champions: Cleveland State
- Runners-up: Butler
- Finals MVP: Cedric Jackson, Cleveland State

Basketball seasons
- ← 2007–08 2009–10 →

2008–09 Horizon League men's basketball standings
	Conf.				Overall
Team	W		L	PCT	W		L	PCT
No. 22 Butler	15	–	3	.833	26	–	6	.813
Green Bay	13	–	5	.722	22	–	11	.667
Cleveland State †	12	–	6	.667	26	–	11	.703
Wright State	12	–	6	.667	20	–	13	.606
Milwaukee	11	–	7	.611	17	–	14	.548
UIC	7	–	11	.389	16	–	15	.516
Youngstown State	7	–	11	.389	11	–	19	.367
Loyola Chicago	6	–	12	.333	14	–	18	.438
Valparaiso	5	–	13	.278	9	–	22	.290
Detroit	2	–	16	.111	7	–	23	.233
† Horizon League Tournament winner As of April 1, 2009; Rankings from AP Poll

The 2008–09 Horizon League men's basketball season marks the 29th season of Horizon League basketball.

== Conference awards & honors ==
=== Weekly awards ===
HL Players of the Week
Throughout the conference season, the HL offices name a player of the week.

Week	Player of the week
November 24	Josh Mayo, UIC
December 1	J'Nathan Bullock, Cleveland State
December 8	Josh Mayo, UIC
December 15	Gordon Hayward, Butler
December 22	J'Nathan Bullock, Cleveland State
December 29	Gordon Hayward, Butler
January 5	Avery Smith, Milwaukee
January 12	Kelvin Bright, Youngstown State
January 19	James Eayrs, Milwaukee
January 26	Ryan Tillema, Green Bay
February 2	Troy Cotton, Green Bay
February 9	Gordon Hayward, Butler; Ryan Tillema, Green Bay
February 16	Norris Cole, Cleveland State
February 23	Justin Cerasoli, Loyola

=== All-Conference Honors ===
Honor	Recipient(s)	School	Position	Year
Player of the Year	Matt Howard	Butler	Forward	Sophomore
Coach of the Year	Brad Stevens	Butler	Head coach	2nd
Newcomer of the Year	Gordon Hayward	Butler	Guard/Forward	Freshman
Defensive Player of the Year	Cedric Jackson	Cleveland State	Guard	Senior
Sixth Man of the Year	Ryan Tillema	Green Bay	Guard	Senior
All Horizon League First Team	J'Nathan Bullock	Cleveland State	Forward	Senior
All Horizon League First Team	Gordon Hayward	Butler	Guard/Forward	Freshman
All Horizon League First Team	Matt Howard	Butler	Forward	Sophomore
All Horizon League First Team	Josh Mayo	UIC	Guard	Senior
All Horizon League First Team	Ryan Tillema	Green Bay	Guard	Senior
All Horizon League Second Team	Todd Brown	Wright State	Guard	Junior
All Horizon League Second Team	Tone Boyle	Milwaukee	Guard	Junior
All Horizon League Second Team	Rahmon Fletcher	Green Bay	Guard	Sophomore
All Horizon League Second Team	Urule Igbavboa	Valparaiso	Forward	Senior
All Horizon League Second Team	Cedric Jackson	Cleveland State	Guard	Senior
All-Newcomer Team	Tone Boyle	Milwaukee	Guard	Junior
All-Newcomer Team	James Eayrs	Milwaukee	Forward	Junior
All-Newcomer Team	Gordon Hayward	Butler	Guard/Forward	Freshman
All-Newcomer Team	Shelvin Mack	Butler	Guard	Freshman
All-Newcomer Team	DeAndre Mays	Youngstown State	Guard	Junior
All Defensive Team	Terry Evans	Green Bay	Forward	Senior
All Defensive Team	Will Graham	Wright State	Guard	Senior
All Defensive Team	Matt Howard	Butler	Forward	Sophomore
All Defensive Team	Cedric Jackson	Cleveland State	Guard	Senior
All Defensive Team	Scott VanderMeer	UIC	Center	Senior

=== Tournament honors ===
Cedric Jackson of Cleveland State was named the tournament MVP.

Horizon League All-Tournament Team	Player	School	Position	Year
Horizon League All-Tournament Team	Cedric Jackson	Cleveland State	Guard	Senior
Horizon League All-Tournament Team	J'Nathan Bullock	Cleveland State	Forward	Senior
Horizon League All-Tournament Team	Norris Cole	Cleveland State	Guard	Sophomore
Horizon League All-Tournament Team	Matt Howard	Butler	Forward	Sophomore
Horizon League All-Tournament Team	Shelvin Mack	Butler	Guard	Freshman
