= Gordon Hayward =

American basketball player (born 1990)

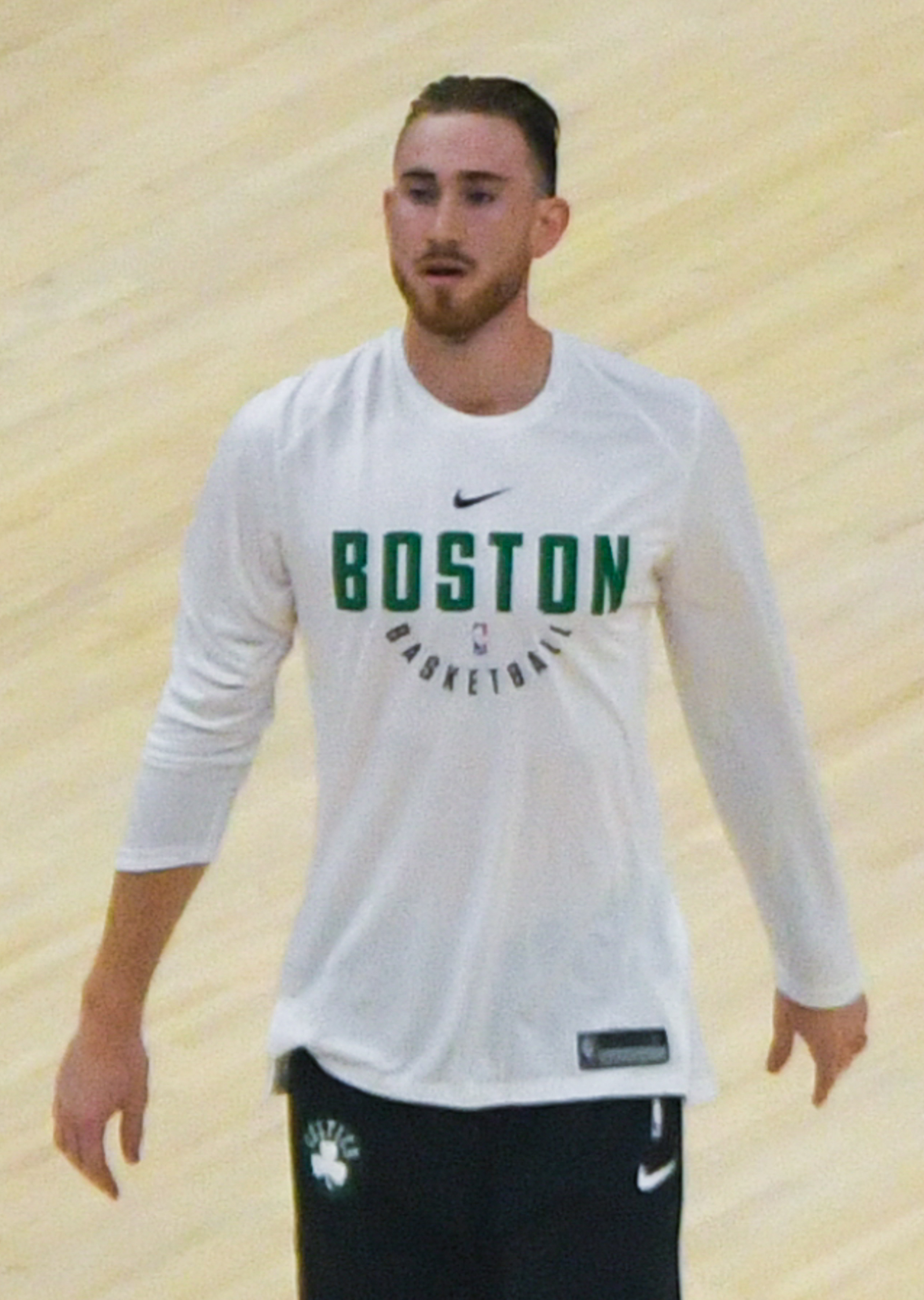
- Hayward with the Boston Celtics in 2017

Personal information
- Born: March 23, 1990 (age 36) Indianapolis, Indiana, U.S.
- Listed height: 6 ft 7 in (2.01 m)
- Listed weight: 225 lb (102 kg)

Career information
- High school: Brownsburg (Brownsburg, Indiana)
- College: Butler (2008–2010)
- NBA draft: 2010: 1st round, 9th overall pick
- Drafted by: Utah Jazz
- Playing career: 2010–2024
- Position: Small forward / power forward
- Number: 20, 33

Career history
- 2010–2017: Utah Jazz
- 2017–2020: Boston Celtics
- 2020–2024: Charlotte Hornets
- 2024: Oklahoma City Thunder

Career highlights
- NBA All-Star (2017); Horizon League Player of the Year (2010); 2× First-team All-Horizon League (2009, 2010); Horizon League Newcomer of the Year (2009)

Career NBA statistics
- Points: 12,687 (15.2 ppg)
- Rebounds: 3,698 (4.4 rpg)
- Assists: 2,940 (3.5 apg)
- Stats at NBA.com
- Stats at Basketball Reference
Medals
Men's basketball
Representing the United States
FIBA U-19 World Cup
| Gold medal – first place | 2009 Auckland | Team |

Gordon Daniel Hayward (born March 23, 1990) is an American former professional basketball player. He played 14 seasons in the National Basketball Association (NBA) for the Utah Jazz, Boston Celtics, Charlotte Hornets, and Oklahoma City Thunder.

In college basketball, Hayward led the Butler Bulldogs to the championship game of the 2010 NCAA tournament. He was subsequently selected by the Utah Jazz with the ninth overall pick of the 2010 NBA draft. Hayward played seven seasons with the Jazz, and was selected to the 2017 NBA All-Star Game. In the 2017 offseason, Hayward signed as a free agent with the Celtics, but was ruled out for the remainder of the 2017–18 season after suffering a fractured tibia and dislocated ankle only five minutes into the season opener. He played two more seasons with the franchise before the Celtics traded Hayward to the Hornets in a sign-and-trade agreement in November 2020.

== High school career ==
Hayward attended Brownsburg High School in Brownsburg, Indiana. He grew from 5 ft 11 in (1.80 m) in height as a freshman to 6 ft 7 in (2.01 m) as a senior. Until his growth spurt, Hayward was more successful in tennis, in which he was a two-time all-state singles player. Hayward's parents, Gordon Scott Hayward and Jody Hayward hosted parties for their son and his high school basketball teammates. Gordon Hayward has a sister, Heather and a cousin, Rob Nix.

As a senior in 2007–08, Hayward averaged 18.0 points, 8.4 rebounds and 3.6 assists per game. Hayward and teammate Julian Mavunga led Brownsburg to the Indiana Class 4A state championship. In the title game, Hayward made the game-winning basket at the buzzer to defeat Marion High School 40–39. Hayward was selected Second-team all-state by AP and First-team all-state by the Indiana Basketball Coaches Association. He was selected Indianapolis Star Player of the Year. and he received the IHSAA Arthur L. Trester Award in Class 4A. Hayward was selected to represent Indiana in the 2008 Indiana – Kentucky Boys All-Star Game, which Indiana won.

== College career ==
Hayward was listed as an unranked three-star prospect on the recruiting website Rivals.com. He accepted a scholarship offer from Butler University, coached by Brad Stevens, despite late interest from Purdue and Michigan.

As a freshman with the Bulldogs in 2008–09, Hayward averaged 13.1 points and 6.5 rebounds per game. He was named Horizon League Newcomer of the Year, and selected to the Horizon League All-Newcomer Team and the All-Horizon League First Team. The Bulldogs won the Horizon League regular season title. In the championship game of the 2009 Horizon League men's basketball tournament, Butler lost to Cleveland State. Butler received an at-large bid to the 2009 NCAA Division I men's basketball tournament, and lost in the First Round against the LSU Tigers.

In 2009–10, Hayward was nominated for various preseason All-America teams and Player of the Year awards. Hayward averaged 15.5 points and 8.2 rebounds per game as a sophomore. The Butler Bulldogs won both the Horizon League regular season title, and the 2010 Horizon League men's basketball tournament. He was named the Horizon League Player of the Year and selected to the All-Horizon League First Team. Hayward was also selected AP All-American Honorable Mention and ESPN Third-team Academic All-American.

Butler lost to Duke in the championship game of the 2010 NCAA Division I men's basketball tournament. In the final seconds, Hayward attempted a game-winning, buzzer-beating, half-court shot, which hit the backboard and rim, and bounced away. The shot is considered one of the most well-known plays in NCAA tournament history. Hayward was selected to the All-Tournament Team.

== Professional career ==
=== Utah Jazz (2010–2017) ===
==== 2010–2013: Early years ====
After the 2010 NCAA basketball tournament, Hayward confirmed that he would submit his name for consideration in the 2010 NBA draft, but did not immediately hire an agent. In May 2010, Hayward announced that he would forgo his final two seasons of college eligibility and enter the NBA draft. He hired Mark Bartelstein as his agent. On June 24, 2010, Hayward was selected as the ninth overall pick in the NBA draft by the Utah Jazz.

As a rookie in 2010–11, Hayward came off the bench. On an episode of Paul George's podcast Podcast P, Hayward recalled not being entrusted with minutes on account of long-time veteran coach Jerry Sloan preferring more experienced players. Sloan's resignation following an argument during a February game coincided with star point guard Deron Williams being traded, which surprised Hayward. He benefitted by receiving more playing time under interim hire Ty Corbin. On April 5, 2011, Hayward had a noticeable performance in an 86–85 victory over the Los Angeles Lakers, finishing with 22 points, 6 rebounds, and 5 assists. Hayward ended the season with a 34-point game, a career high at the time, in a 107–103 win over the Denver Nuggets on April 13. As a sophomore in 2011–12, Hayward established himself in the starting lineup, and was selected to play in the 2012 NBA Rising Stars Challenge game. Hayward played for Team Chuck and recorded 14 points as his team won the game. Hayward made his NBA playoffs debut against the San Antonio Spurs as the Jazz lost 4–0 in the first round. Playing in all four games of the series, Hayward averaged 7.3 points per game, 2.8 rebounds per game, 3.0 assists per game, and 0.8 steals per game while playing 30.8 minutes per game.

In the 2012–13 season, Hayward mainly came off the bench as a sixth man, but averaged a career high in points per game (11.8). Hayward received a third-place vote for the NBA Sixth Man of the Year award.

==== 2013–2016: Breakthrough ====
After the departure of Paul Millsap and Al Jefferson during the 2013 offseason, Hayward emerged as the Jazz's new offensive threat, averaging career highs per game in points, rebounds, assists and steals. On January 7, 2014, Hayward scored career-high 37 points in a win over the Oklahoma City Thunder. After the 2013–14 season, Hayward became a restricted free agent. On July 10, 2014, Hayward received a four-year, $63 million maximum contract offer from the Charlotte Hornets. On July 12, 2014, the Jazz matched the offer sheet, re-signing Hayward.

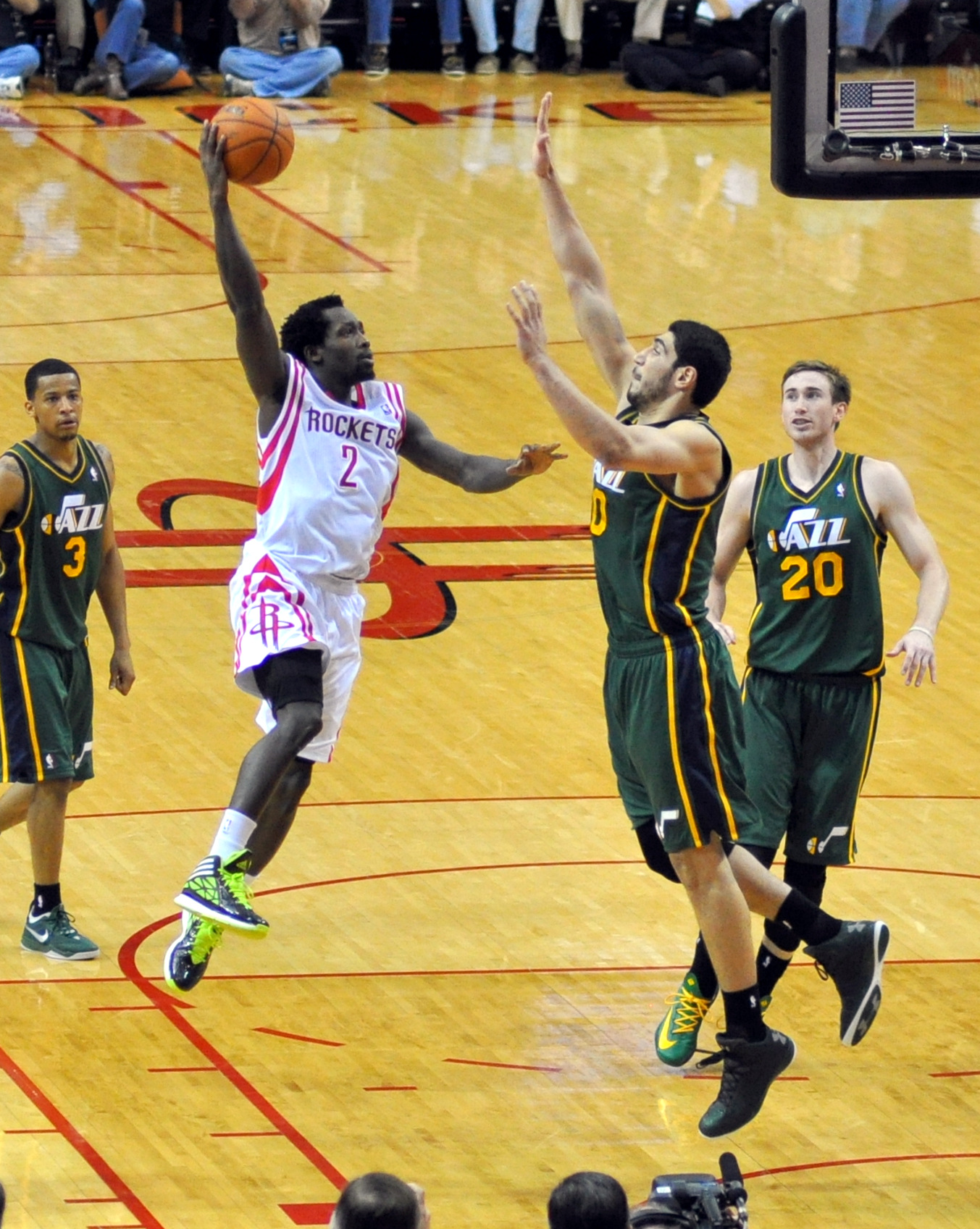
Left to right: Trey Burke, Patrick Beverley, Enes Kanter, and Hayward

In 2014–15, Hayward averaged a career high in points per game. On November 14, 2014, Hayward scored a season-high 33 points in 102–100 win over the New York Knicks. In 2015–16, he again averaged a career high in points per game. On January 18, 2016, Hayward scored a season-high 36 points in a 124–119 double overtime loss to the Charlotte Hornets.

==== 2016–2017: All-Star selection ====
On October 7, 2016, Hayward suffered a fracture of the fourth finger on his left hand. He made his season debut on November 6, scoring 28 points in a 114–109 win over the New York Knicks. Hayward averaged a career high in points per game, improving his points per game for a sixth straight season. On January 26, 2017, Hayward was selected to the 2017 NBA All-Star Game by the vote of Western Conference coaches. On February 9, 2017, he scored a season-high 36 points in a 112–105 overtime loss to the Dallas Mavericks. On March 2, 2017, Hayward scored a career-high 38 points in a 107–100 loss to the Indiana Pacers. He set a new career high on April 7, 2017, scoring 39 points in a 120–113 win over the Minnesota Timberwolves.

On April 21, 2017, in Game 3 of the Jazz's first-round playoff series against the Los Angeles Clippers, Hayward scored a career-high 40 points in a 111–106 loss. Hayward's 21 first-quarter points in Game 3 was a franchise playoff record for any one quarter. In Game 7 of the series on April 30, he scored 26 points as the Jazz eliminated the Clippers with a 104–91 victory, closing out the first-round series 4–3 to earn the franchise's first postseason victory since 2010. The Jazz went on to lose in the second round to the Golden State Warriors in 4 games. In June, Hayward declined his player option for the upcoming and became an unrestricted free agent.

=== Boston Celtics (2017–2020) ===
On July 4, 2017, Hayward announced via The Players' Tribune that he would sign with the Boston Celtics. On July 14, he signed with the Celtics to a reported four-year, $128 million contract.

On October 17, 2017, Hayward suffered a fractured tibia and dislocated ankle in his left leg less than six minutes into the Celtics' regular-season opener against the Cleveland Cavaliers. He landed awkwardly on the hardwood after an attempted alley-oop off a pass from Kyrie Irving, causing his leg to collapse underneath his weight. He was later ruled out for the rest of the season after undergoing surgery. Hayward had made considerable progress until he needed a second surgery in March 2018. He thus also missed the deep playoff run to the Eastern Conference Finals, where his Boston Celtics lost in seven games to the same Cleveland Cavaliers team he had suffered the season-ending injury against.

On October 16, 2018, Hayward played in his first regular season game since the ankle injury. He recorded 10 points and five rebounds in 25 minutes in a 105–87 season-opening win over the Philadelphia 76ers. On December 1, 2018, he scored a season-high 30 points in a 118–109 win over the Minnesota Timberwolves. On January 2, 2019, Hayward set a new season-high with 35 points in a 115–102 win over the Timberwolves. On April 21, he scored a playoff-high 20 points in a 110–106 win over the Indiana Pacers. Hayward was limited to a bench role for most of the 2018–19 campaign, only starting 18 out of 72 games in the regular season and no games in the playoffs.

On November 5, 2019, Hayward matched his regular-season career high with 39 points in a 119–116 win over the Cavaliers. On November 9, he fractured his left hand in a game against the San Antonio Spurs. On December 9, 2019, Hayward returned from injury against the Cavaliers.

On August 17, 2020, Hayward was injured with a Grade 3 right ankle sprain after improperly landing on teammate Daniel Theis' foot while jumping for a rebound during the 1st round of the playoffs against the Philadelphia 76ers. On September 20, Hayward returned to play Game 3 of the Eastern Conference Finals against the Miami Heat, however only in minimal capacity as the Heat went on to eliminate the Celtics in 6 games. In November, he declined his $34.2 million player option with the Celtics to become an unrestricted free agent.

=== Charlotte Hornets (2020–2024) ===
On November 29, 2020, Hayward was signed by the Celtics to a four-year, $120 million deal and then traded to the Charlotte Hornets, along with 2023 and 2024 second-round draft picks, in exchange for a conditional 2022 second-round draft pick. The trade also allowed the Boston Celtics to create a traded-player exception worth the value of the first year of Hayward's four-year, $120 million deal, that is $28.5 million, making it the biggest traded-player exception created in the history of the NBA. On December 23, 2020, Hayward made his Hornets debut, putting up 28 points, seven assists, and four rebounds in a 121–114 loss to the Cleveland Cavaliers. On January 6, 2021, Hayward set a new career-high of 44 points in a 102–94 win over the Atlanta Hawks.

On December 5, 2021, Hayward scored a season-high 41 points, alongside five rebounds and three assists, in a 131–115 win over the San Antonio Spurs. On February 7, 2022, Hayward suffered an ankle injury in a 101–116 loss to the Toronto Raptors. Two days later, he was diagnosed with sprained ligaments in his left ankle and was ruled out indefinitely. He made his return from injury on April 2, logging five points and four assists in a 114–144 loss to the Philadelphia 76ers. On April 10, Hayward was ruled out for at least two weeks with discomfort in his left foot. The Hornets were eliminated from the play-in tournament in a loss to the Atlanta Hawks, which Hayward did not play in.

On November 3, 2022, the Hornets announced that Hayward had suffered a left shoulder contusion and would be out indefinitely. He made his return from injury on November 18, recording 13 points, six rebounds and seven assists in a 132–122 overtime loss to the Cleveland Cavaliers. On November 25, Hayward's agent, Mark Bartelstein, stated to ESPN that Hayward would be out indefinitely and evaluated on a week-to-week basis due to a left shoulder fracture. Hayward made his return to the lineup on December 16, recording nine points, three rebounds, five assists and two steals in a 125–106 loss to the Atlanta Hawks. He also missed eight games in January 2023 with left hamstring soreness. On February 24, 2023, Hayward recorded season-highs of 27 points and 13 rebounds, alongside five assists and two steals, in a 121–113 win over the Minnesota Timberwolves.

=== Oklahoma City Thunder (2024) ===
On February 8, 2024, Hayward was traded to the Oklahoma City Thunder in exchange for Dāvis Bertāns, Tre Mann, Vasilije Micić, a 2024 second-round pick, a 2025 second-round pick, and cash considerations. On February 22, Hayward made his Thunder debut, pulling in four rebounds in a 129–107 win over the Los Angeles Clippers.

On August 1, 2024, Hayward announced on social media his retirement from professional basketball.

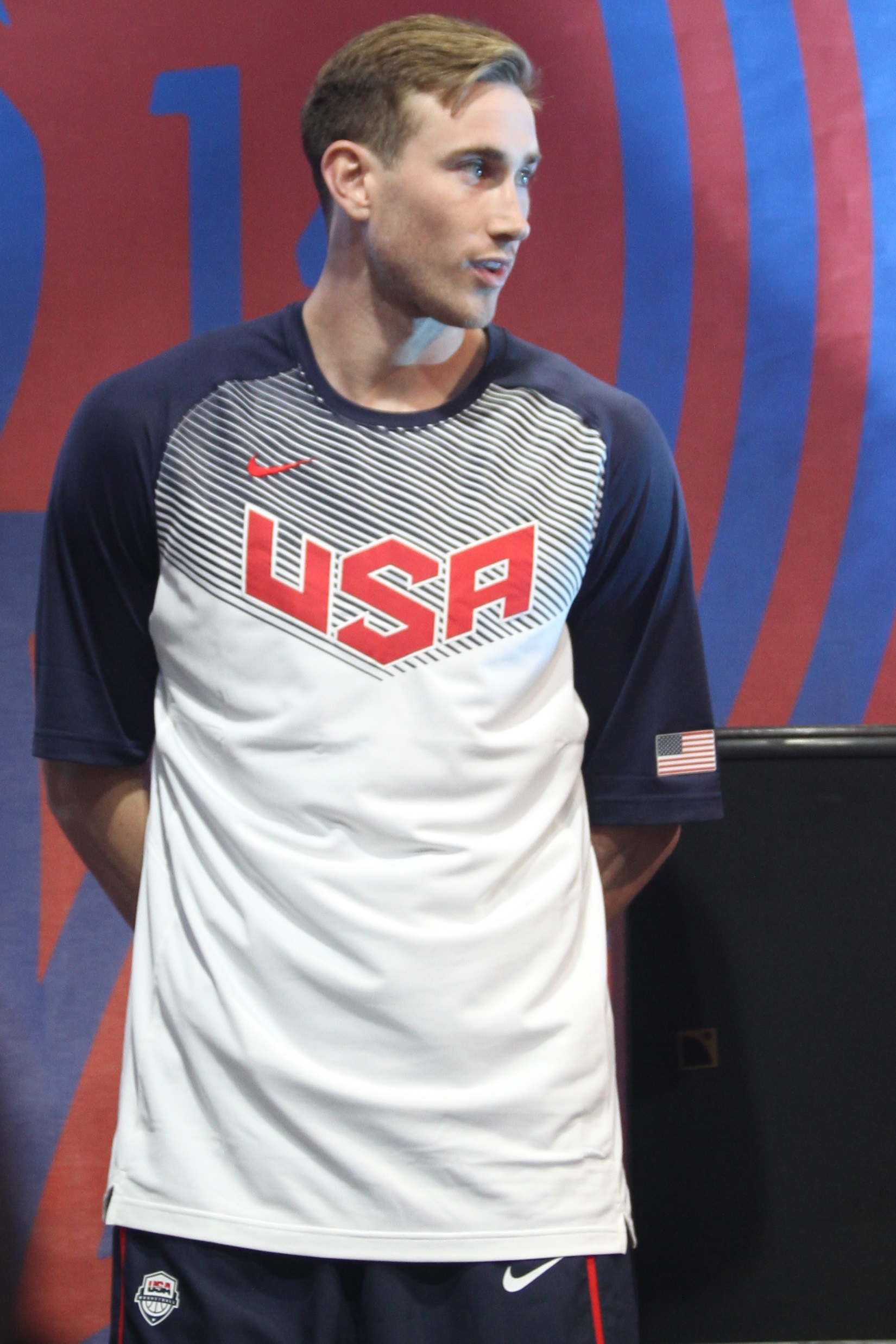
Hayward with the USA men's national basketball team in 2014.

== National team career ==
Hayward was selected as a member of the United States team for the 2009 FIBA Under-19 World Championship. Hayward averaged 10 points and 5.7 rebounds per game as Team USA won the championship. He was selected to the All-Tournament Team.

In 2012, Hayward was selected as a member of the USA Basketball Select Team that trained against the United States Olympic team.

In 2014, he was selected as a finalist for the United States FIBA Basketball World Cup team, but he did not make the final 12-man roster.

In 2016, Hayward was named a finalist for the United States Olympic team. He ultimately withdrew his name from selection, citing "family obligations".

== Post-playing career ==
On October 14, 2025, Hayward returned to Butler to serve as an executive basketball advisor for the school.

== Career statistics ==
Legend
| GP | Games played | GS | Games started | MPG | Minutes per game |
| FG% | Field goal percentage | 3P% | 3-point field goal percentage | FT% | Free throw percentage |
| RPG | Rebounds per game | APG | Assists per game | SPG | Steals per game |
| BPG | Blocks per game | PPG | Points per game | **Bold** | Career high |
| * | Led the league | ‡ | NBA record |

=== NBA ===
==== Regular season ====
| Year | Team | GP | GS | MPG | FG% | 3P% | FT% | RPG | APG | SPG | BPG | PPG |
|---|---|---|---|---|---|---|---|---|---|---|---|---|
| 2010–11 | Utah | 72 | 17 | 16.9 | .485 | .473 | .711 | 1.9 | 1.1 | .4 | .3 | 5.4 |
| 2011–12 | Utah | 66* | 58 | 30.5 | .456 | .346 | .832 | 3.5 | 3.1 | .8 | **.6** | 11.8 |
| 2012–13 | Utah | 72 | 27 | 29.2 | .435 | .415 | .827 | 3.1 | 3.0 | .8 | .5 | 14.1 |
| 2013–14 | Utah | 77 | 77 | **36.4** | .413 | .304 | .816 | 5.1 | **5.2** | **1.4** | .5 | 16.2 |
| 2014–15 | Utah | 76 | 76 | 34.4 | .445 | .364 | .812 | 4.9 | 4.1 | **1.4** | .4 | 19.3 |
| 2015–16 | Utah | **80** | **80** | 36.2 | .433 | .349 | .824 | 5.0 | 3.7 | 1.2 | .3 | 19.7 |
| 2016–17 | Utah | 73 | 73 | 34.5 | .471 | .398 | .844 | 5.4 | 3.5 | 1.0 | .3 | **21.9** |
| 2017–18 | Boston | 1 | 1 | 5.3 | **.500** | .000 | — | 1.0 | .0 | .0 | .0 | 2.0 |
| 2018–19 | Boston | 72 | 18 | 25.9 | .466 | .333 | .834 | 4.5 | 3.4 | .9 | .3 | 11.5 |
| 2019–20 | Boston | 52 | 52 | 33.5 | **.500** | .383 | **.855** | **6.7** | 4.1 | .7 | .4 | 17.5 |
| 2020–21 | Charlotte | 44 | 44 | 34.0 | .473 | .415 | .843 | 5.9 | 4.1 | 1.2 | .3 | 19.6 |
| 2021–22 | Charlotte | 49 | 48 | 31.9 | .459 | .391 | .846 | 4.6 | 3.6 | 1.0 | .4 | 15.9 |
| 2022–23 | Charlotte | 50 | 50 | 31.5 | .475 | .325 | .811 | 4.3 | 4.1 | .8 | .2 | 14.7 |
| 2023–24 | Charlotte | 25 | 25 | 31.9 | .468 | .361 | .765 | 4.7 | 4.6 | 1.1 | .5 | 14.5 |
| 2023–24 | Oklahoma City | 26 | 3 | 17.2 | .453 | **.517** | .692 | 2.5 | 1.6 | .5 | .0 | 5.3 |
| Career | | 835 | 649 | 30.7 | .455 | .370 | .822 | 4.4 | 3.5 | 1.0 | .4 | 15.2 |
| All-Star | | 1 | 0 | 17.3 | .571 | .000 | — | 1.0 | 2.0 | 4.0 | .0 | 8.0 |

==== Playoffs ====
| Year | Team | GP | GS | MPG | FG% | 3P% | FT% | RPG | APG | SPG | BPG | PPG |
|---|---|---|---|---|---|---|---|---|---|---|---|---|
| 2012 | Utah | 4 | 4 | 30.6 | .182 | .083 | **1.000** | 2.8 | 3.0 | .8 | .0 | 7.3 |
| 2017 | Utah | **11** | **11** | **37.3** | **.441** | **.412** | .934 | **6.1** | **3.4** | .9 | .3 | **24.1** |
| 2019 | Boston | 9 | 0 | 29.6 | .414 | .375 | **1.000** | 3.7 | 2.4 | .7 | .3 | 9.6 |
| 2020 | Boston | 5 | 1 | 31.4 | .400 | .292 | .875 | 4.0 | 2.8 | **1.4** | **.4** | 10.8 |
| 2024 | Oklahoma City | 7 | 0 | 6.6 | .000 | — | — | 1.9 | .4 | .1 | .1 | .0 |
| Career | | 36 | 16 | 27.9 | .401 | .352 | .950‡ | 4.1 | 2.4 | .8 | .3 | 12.1 |

=== College ===
| Year | Team | GP | GS | MPG | FG% | 3P% | FT% | RPG | APG | SPG | BPG | PPG |
|---|---|---|---|---|---|---|---|---|---|---|---|---|
| 2008–09 | Butler | 32 | 32 | 32.7 | **.479** | **.448** | .815 | 6.5 | **2.0** | **1.5** | **.9** | 13.1 |
| 2009–10 | Butler | **37** | **37** | **33.5** | .464 | .294 | **.829** | **8.2** | 1.7 | 1.1 | .8 | **15.5** |
| Career | | 69 | 69 | 33.1 | .470 | .369 | .824 | 7.4 | 1.8 | 1.3 | .9 | 14.4 |

== Personal life ==
Hayward is the son of Jody and Gordon Scott Hayward. He has a twin sister, Heather, who played tennis for Butler University.

In 2014, Hayward married Robyn Van Vliet. They have four children: three daughters (born in 2015, 2016, and 2019) and a son born in 2020. Their son was born while Hayward was in the NBA Bubble.

Hayward is a Catholic and has said that he plays basketball "for the glory of God." Specifically, he became Catholic in 2024. He was formally received by Archbishop Timothy Broglio at the church of San Sebastiano fuori le mura in Rome.

At Butler, Hayward started in a dual degree program for computer engineering and physics. He later shifted to a math major but left early to pursue his NBA career.

=== Advertising ===
In 2018, Hayward signed an endorsement deal with Chinese sports footwear and apparel company Anta. As part of the deal, Hayward would debut a signature shoe line. Hayward previously had endorsement deals with Peak and Nike.

Hayward appeared in advertisements for Unilever's line of men's bodycare products during the 2018 NCAA Division I men's basketball tournament.

=== Esports and games ===
Gordon Hayward

Twitch information
- Channel: gdhayward
- Years active: 2022–present
- Game: Chess
- Followers: 80,484
- Last updated: September 14, 2022

Hayward is interested in video games and named League of Legends as his favorite esport. Hayward also is active in mobile games such as Clash Royale, where he created a clan inviting friends and fans to compete and socialize, and he is an investor in mobile gaming esports organization Tribe Gaming. In October 2018, League of Legends developer Riot Games released an animated commercial in support of Hayward's recovery from an ankle injury while playing for the Boston Celtics. Hayward has appeared in commercials for the IGN Pro League and played StarCraft II during IGN Pro League 3 in 2011. Hayward has esports and gaming endorsements with HyperX, Xfinity, and AutoFull. On August 9, 2019, he signed an honorary lifetime contract for Hupu, a Chinese League of Legend Teams as its midlaner.

Hayward is a fan of chess. He started playing against his mother when he was young, and he returned to playing during the COVID-19 pandemic. In July 2022, he joined Chess.com as a streaming partner under the username "gdhayward" on Twitch.

=== Movie Production ===
In 2023, Hayward's production company, Whiskey Creek Productions, released its first feature film, Notice to Quit, a drama starring Michael Zegen. Hayward is listed as one of the executive producers of the film alongside Simon Hacker. He spent time in the Skywalker Ranch for the movie's post-production. Hayward also started a movie distribution company.
