= 1981 Midwestern City Conference men's basketball tournament =

- Classification: Division I
- Season: 1980–81
- Teams: 7
- Finals site: Riverfront Coliseum; Cincinnati, Ohio
- Champions: Oklahoma City (1st title)
- Winning coach: Ken Trickey (1st title)
- MVP: Anthony Hicks (Xavier)
- Midwestern City Conference men's basketball tournaments

1980–81 Midwestern City Conference men's basketball standings
	Conf.				Overall
Team	W		L	PCT	W		L	PCT
Xavier	8	–	3	.727	12	–	16	.429
Loyola-Chicago	7	–	4	.636	13	–	15	.464
Oklahoma City †	7	–	4	.636	14	–	15	.483
Oral Roberts	6	–	5	.545	11	–	16	.407
Evansville	6	–	5	.545	19	–	9	.679
Detroit	1	–	5	.167	9	–	18	.333
Butler	1	–	10	.091	5	–	22	.185
† 1981 MCC tournament winner

The 1981 Midwestern City Conference men's basketball tournament (now known as the Horizon League men's basketball tournament) was held March 3–5 at campus sites (quarterfinals), Frederickson Fieldhouse in Oklahoma City, Oklahoma (semifinals), and Riverfront Coliseum in Cincinnati, Ohio (finals).

Oklahoma City defeated Xavier in the championship game, 82–76, to win their first MCC/Horizon League men's basketball tournament.

The Chiefs, however, did not receive a bid to the 1981 NCAA tournament.

== Format ==
All seven conference members participated in the tournament and were seeded based on regular season conference records. The top seed (Xavier) was given a bye into the semifinal round while the remaining six teams were placed into the initial quarterfinal round.

== Bracket ==
Quarterfinals; Friday, March 3
5	Evansville	77
4	Oral Roberts	71
3	Loyola–Chicago	86
6	Detroit	80
7	Butler	69
2	Oklahoma City	86

Semifinals; Saturday, March 4
1	Xavier	72
5	Evansville	69
3	Loyola–Chicago	71
2	Oklahoma City	73

Championship; Sunday, March 5
1	Xavier	76
2	Oklahoma City	82
