= 1989 Midwestern Collegiate Conference men's basketball tournament =

- Classification: Division I
- Season: 1988–89
- Teams: 7
- Site: UD Arena; Dayton, Ohio
- Champions: Xavier (5th title)
- Winning coach: Pete Gillen (4th title)
- MVP: Tyrone Hill (Xavier)

1988–89 Midwestern Collegiate Conference men's basketball standings
	Conf.				Overall
Team	W		L	PCT	W		L	PCT
Evansville	10	–	2	.833	25	–	6	.806
Saint Louis	8	–	4	.667	27	–	10	.730
Xavier †	7	–	5	.583	21	–	12	.636
Dayton	6	–	6	.500	12	–	17	.414
Detroit Mercy	4	–	8	.333	7	–	21	.250
Loyola (IL)	4	–	8	.333	11	–	17	.393
Butler	3	–	9	.250	11	–	17	.393
† 1989 MCC tournament winner Rankings from AP Poll

The 1989 Midwestern Collegiate Conference men's basketball tournament (now known as the Horizon League men's basketball tournament) was held March 9–11 at UD Arena in Dayton, Ohio.

Xavier defeated Evansville in the championship game, 85–78, to win their fourth consecutive (fifth overall) MCC/Horizon League men's basketball tournament.

The Musketeers received an automatic bid to the 1989 NCAA tournament as the #14 seed in the Southeast region. Evansville received an at-large bid as the #11 seed in the West region. Xavier lost to the eventual national champion, Michigan, in the first round. Evansville defeated Oregon State, before losing to eventual national runner-up Seton Hall in the second round.

== Format ==
All seven conference members participated in the tournament and were seeded based on regular season conference records, with the top seed (Evansville) earning a bye into the semifinal round.

== Bracket ==
Quarterfinals; Friday, March 9
4	Dayton	77
5	Detroit	54
3	Xavier	85
6	Loyola-Chicago	83
7	Butler	64
2	Saint Louis	68

Semifinals; Saturday, March 10
1	Evansville	84
4	Dayton	79
3	Xavier	79
2	Saint Louis	56

Championship; Sunday, March 11
1	Evansville	78
3	Xavier	85
