= 1986 Midwestern Collegiate Conference men's basketball tournament =

- Classification: Division I
- Season: 1985–86
- Teams: 7
- Site: Market Square Arena; Indianapolis, Indiana
- Champions: Xavier (2nd title)
- Winning coach: Pete Gillen (1st title)
- MVP: Byron Larkin (Xavier)

1985–86 Midwestern Collegiate Conference men's basketball standings
	Conf.				Overall
Team	W		L	PCT	W		L	PCT
Xavier †	10	–	2	.833	25	–	5	.833
Saint Louis	8	–	4	.667	18	–	12	.600
Detroit	7	–	5	.583	14	–	15	.483
Loyola (IL)	7	–	5	.583	13	–	16	.448
Oral Roberts	5	–	7	.417	10	–	18	.357
Evansville	3	–	9	.250	8	–	19	.296
Butler	2	–	10	.167	9	–	19	.321
† 1986 MCC tournament winner

The 1986 Midwestern Collegiate Conference men's basketball tournament (now known as the Horizon League men's basketball tournament) was held February 27–March 1 at Market Square Arena in Indianapolis, Indiana.

Xavier defeated Saint Louis in the championship game, 74–66, to win their first MCC/Horizon League men's basketball tournament.

The Musketeers received an automatic bid to the 1986 NCAA tournament as the #12 seed in the Southeast region.

== Format ==
All seven conference members participated in the tournament and were seeded based on regular season conference records.

== Bracket ==
Quarterfinals; Friday, February 27
4	Loyola–Chicago	76
5	Oral Roberts	70
3	Detroit	70
6	Evansville	52
7	Butler	61
2	Saint Louis	63

Semifinals; Saturday, February 28
1	Xavier	99
4	Loyola–Chicago	91
3	Detroit	49
2	Saint Louis	59

Championship; Sunday, March 1
1	Xavier	74
2	Saint Louis	66
