= 2018–19 Horizon League men's basketball season =

- League: NCAA Division I
- Sport: Basketball
- Duration: November 2018–March 2019
- Teams: 10

Regular Season
- Champion: Wright State & Northern Kentucky
- Season MVP: Drew McDonald, Northern Kentucky

Tournament
- Champions: Northern Kentucky
- Runners-up: Wright State
- Finals MVP: Drew McDonald

Horizon League men's basketball seasons
- ← 2017–18 2019–20 →

2018–19 Horizon League men's basketball standings
| | Conf. | | | | Overall |
| Team | W | | L | PCT | W | | L | PCT |
|---|---|---|---|---|---|---|---|---|
| Wright State | 13 | – | 5 | .722 | 21 | – | 14 | .600 |
| Northern Kentucky † | 13 | – | 5 | .722 | 26 | – | 9 | .743 |
| Oakland | 11 | – | 7 | .611 | 16 | – | 17 | .485 |
| Green Bay | 10 | – | 8 | .556 | 21 | – | 17 | .553 |
| UIC | 10 | – | 8 | .556 | 16 | – | 16 | .500 |
| Youngstown State | 8 | – | 10 | .444 | 12 | – | 20 | .375 |
| Detroit Mercy | 8 | – | 10 | .444 | 11 | – | 20 | .355 |
| IUPUI | 8 | – | 10 | .444 | 16 | – | 17 | .485 |
| Cleveland State | 5 | – | 13 | .278 | 10 | – | 21 | .323 |
| Milwaukee | 4 | – | 14 | .222 | 9 | – | 22 | .290 |
† 2019 Horizon League tournament winner

The 2018–19 Horizon League men's basketball season began with practices in October 2018, followed by the start of the 2018–19 NCAA Division I men's basketball season in November. Conference play began in January 2019 and concluded in February 2019. The season marked the 39th season of Horizon League basketball.

== Preseason ==
=== Preseason poll ===
| Rank | Team |
|---|---|
| 1 | Wright State (25) |
| 2 | Northern Kentucky (10) |
| 3 | UIC (4) |
| 4 | Oakland |
| 5 | Green Bay |
| 6 | IUPUI |
| 7 | Cleveland State |
| 8 | Milwaukee (1) |
| 9 | Youngstown State |
| 10 | Detroit Mercy |

() first place votes

=== Preseason All-Conference Teams ===
| Award | Recipients |
|---|---|
| First Team | Tyree Appleby (Cleveland State); Sandy Cohen III (Green Bay); Drew McDonald (Northern Kentucky); Marcus Ottey (UIC); Loudon Love (Wright State) |
| Second Team | Kameron Hankerson (Green Bay); Jalen Tate (Northern Kentucky); Tarkus Ferguson (UIC); Mark Hughes (Wright State); Naz Bohannon (Youngstown State) |

Preseason Player of the Year: Drew McDonald, Northern Kentucky

== Regular season ==
=== Conference matrix ===
This table summarizes the head-to-head results between teams in conference play.

| | Cleveland State | Detroit Mercy | Green Bay | IUPUI | Milwaukee | Northern Kentucky | Oakland | UIC | Wright State | Youngstown State |
|---|---|---|---|---|---|---|---|---|---|---|
| vs. Cleveland State | – | 2–0 | 2–0 | 1–1 | 1–1 | 1–1 | 2–0 | 2–0 | 2–0 | 0–2 |
| vs. Detroit Mercy | 0–2 | – | 1–1 | 1–1 | 0–2 | 2–0 | 2–0 | 2–0 | 1–1 | 1–1 |
| vs. Green Bay | 0–2 | 1–1 | – | 2–0 | 0–2 | 2–0 | 1–1 | 0–2 | 1–1 | 1–1 |
| vs. IUPUI | 1–1 | 1–1 | 0–2 | – | 1–1 | 1–1 | 1–1 | 1–1 | 2–0 | 2–0 |
| vs. Milwaukee | 1–1 | 2–0 | 2–0 | 1–1 | – | 2–0 | 1–1 | 1–1 | 2–0 | 2–0 |
| vs. Northern Kentucky | 1–1 | 0–2 | 0–2 | 1–1 | 0–2 | – | 1–1 | 1–1 | 1–1 | 0–2 |
| vs. Oakland | 0–2 | 0–2 | 1–1 | 1–1 | 1–1 | 1–1 | – | 0–2 | 2–0 | 1–1 |
| vs. UIC | 0–2 | 0–2 | 2–0 | 1–1 | 1–1 | 1–1 | 2–0 | – | 0–2 | 1–1 |
| vs. Wright State | 0–2 | 1–1 | 1–1 | 0–2 | 0–2 | 1–1 | 0–2 | 2–0 | – | 0–2 |
| vs. Youngstown State | 2–0 | 1–1 | 1–1 | 0–2 | 0–2 | 2–0 | 1–1 | 1–1 | 2–0 | – |
| Total | 5–13 | 8–10 | 10–8 | 8–10 | 4–14 | 13–5 | 11–7 | 10–8 | 13–5 | 8–10 |

== Coaches ==
=== Coaching changes ===
On March 26, 2018, Detroit Mercy fired head coach Bacari Alexander after two seasons. On June 5, the school hired Texas Southern head coach Mike Davis as the Titans' new coach.
