= Pete Gillen =

American basketball player-coach

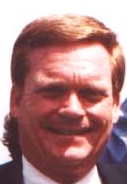

Biographical details
- Born: June 20, 1947 (age 79); Brooklyn, New York, U.S.

Playing career
- 1965–1968: Fairfield
- Position: Guard

Coaching career (HC unless noted)
- 1970–1971: Brooklyn Preparatory HS (assistant)
- 1971–1973: Brooklyn Preparatory HS
- 1975–1976: Hawaii (assistant)
- 1976–1978: VMI (assistant)
- 1978–1980: Villanova (assistant)
- 1980–1985: Notre Dame (assistant)
- 1985–1994: Xavier
- 1994–1998: Providence
- 1998–2005: Virginia

Head coaching record
- Overall: 392–221
- Tournaments: 8–9 (NCAA Division I); 6–7 (NIT)

Accomplishments and honors

Championships
- 5 MCC tournament (1986–1989, 1991); 6 MCC regular season (1986, 1988, 1990, 1991, 1993, 1994)

Awards
- 5x MCC Coach of the Year (1986, 1988, 1990, 1993, 1994)

Peter Joseph Gillen (born June 20, 1947) is an American former college basketball head coach of the Division I Providence Friars and Virginia Cavaliers and is a member of the New York City Basketball Hall of Fame. Gillen is currently a college basketball analyst with the CBS Sports Network.

== Biography ==
=== Playing career ===
Gillen was a two sport athlete in baseball and basketball at Fairfield University, where he received his bachelor's degree cum laude in English Literature in 1968.

=== Coaching career ===
Coach Gillen began his coaching career at his high school alma mater Brooklyn Prep, first as freshman coach in the 1970–71 school year, then as varsity head coach from 1971 to 1973. He soon moved to the collegiate level when he joined the coaching staff of the University of Hawaii Rainbow Warriors, with Rick Pitino as one of his fellow assistants. Gillen followed that with subsequent assistant coaching stints at the Virginia Military Institute, Villanova University under Rollie Massimino, and the University of Notre Dame under Digger Phelps, from 1980 to 1985.

He was head basketball coach at Xavier University from 1985 to 1994, Providence College from 1994 to 1998, and the University of Virginia from 1998 to 2005.

At Xavier, Gillen compiled an impressive record, taking the Musketeers to the NCAA tournament seven times and to the NIT tournament once (1994). He won 202 games in the third-longest tenure ever for a XU coach. He was the winningest coach in XU history until Chris Mack passed him in 2018.

Following his success at Xavier, Gillen was hired at Providence to replace Rick Barnes, who had left to coach Clemson University. He followed PC's 1994 Big East title with two trips to the NIT before the Friars' 1997 run to the Elite Eight, upsetting Marquette and Duke and beating Chattanooga before losing in overtime to eventual national champion Arizona.

Following a tough 1997–98 year, where he lost four starters (three to graduation, and one (God Shammgod) to the NBA draft), Gillen moved on, replacing Jeff Jones at Virginia, who resigned on March 15, 1998 after eight years as the Cavaliers’ head coach. Gillen's seven Virginia teams compiled an overall record of 118–93 and competed in five postseason tournaments. The Cavaliers participated in the 2001 NCAA tournament and in the National Invitation Tournament four times. He resigned after the 2004–05 season. Gillen was notorious for his philosophy of expeditiously calling timeouts as he felt needed – routinely using most, if not all, of his teams' allotted timeouts in the first half of games.

In September 2008, Gillen was inducted into the New York City Basketball Hall of Fame along with NBA stars Kenny Anderson, Sam Perkins, and Rod Strickland, along with pioneers Lou Bender and Eddie Younger.

==== USA Basketball ====
Coach Gillen was an assistant coach under Don Nelson for the US national team during the 1994 FIBA World Championship, winning the gold medal.

== Broadcasting career ==
In 2005, Gillen joined College Sports Television (later CBS College Sports and now CBS Sports Network) as a college basketball analyst.

== Head coaching record ==
Record table
Season	Team	Overall	Conference	Standing	Postseason
Xavier Musketeers (Midwestern Collegiate Conference) (1985–1994)
1985–86	Xavier	25–5	10–2	1st	NCAA Division I First Round
1986–87	Xavier	19–13	7–5	T–3rd	NCAA Division I Second Round
1987–88	Xavier	26–4	9–1	1st	NCAA Division I First Round
1988–89	Xavier	21–12	7–5	3rd	NCAA Division I First Round
1989–90	Xavier	28–5	12–2	1st	NCAA Division I Sweet 16
1990–91	Xavier	22–10	11–3	1st	NCAA Division I Second Round
1991–92	Xavier	15–12	7–3	T–2nd	
1992–93	Xavier	24–6	12–2	T–1st	NCAA Division I Second Round
1993–94	Xavier	22–8	8–2	1st	NIT Quarterfinals
Xavier:		202–75 (.729)	83–25 (.769)		
Providence Friars (Big East Conference) (1994–1998)
1994–95	Providence	17–13	7–11	T–6th	NIT Second Round
1995–96	Providence	18–12	9–9	3rd (BE7)	NIT Second Round
1996–97	Providence	24–12	10–8	T–2nd (BE7)	NCAA Division I Elite Eight
1997–98	Providence	13–16	7–11	4th (BE7)	
Providence:		72–53 (.576)	33–39 (.458)		
Virginia Cavaliers (Atlantic Coast Conference) (1998–2005)
1998–99	Virginia	14–16	4–12	9th	
1999–00	Virginia	19–12	9–7	T–3rd	NIT First Round
2000–01	Virginia	20–9	9–7	4th	NCAA Division I First Round
2001–02	Virginia	17–12	7–9	T–5th	NIT First Round
2002–03	Virginia	16–16	6–10	T–6th	NIT Second Round
2003–04	Virginia	18–13	6–10	T–7th	NIT Second Round
2004–05	Virginia	14–15	4–12	T–10th	
Virginia:		118–93 (.559)	45–67 (.402)		
Total:		392–221 (.639)			
National champion Postseason invitational champion Conference regular season champion Conference regular season and conference tournament champion Division regular season champion Division regular season and conference tournament champion Conference tournament champion
