= 1980–81 Oklahoma City Chiefs men's basketball team =

American college basketball season

1980–81 Oklahoma City Chiefs men's basketball

Midwestern City Conference Tournament Champions
- Conference: Midwestern City Conference
- Record: 14–15 (7–4 MCC)
- Head coach: Ken Trickey (2nd season)
- Home arena: Frederickson Fieldhouse

1980–81 Midwestern City Conference men's basketball standings
	Conf.				Overall
Team	W		L	PCT	W		L	PCT
Xavier	8	–	3	.727	12	–	16	.429
Loyola-Chicago	7	–	4	.636	13	–	15	.464
Oklahoma City †	7	–	4	.636	14	–	15	.483
Oral Roberts	6	–	5	.545	11	–	16	.407
Evansville	6	–	5	.545	19	–	9	.679
Detroit	1	–	5	.167	9	–	18	.333
Butler	1	–	10	.091	5	–	22	.185
† 1981 MCC tournament winner

The 1980–81 Oklahoma City Chiefs men's basketball team represented Oklahoma City University in the 1980–81 NCAA Division I men's basketball season as a member of the Midwestern City Conference. They finished the season 14-15 overall, tied for second in the MCC regular season title with a 7–4 record and won the 1981 Midwestern City Conference men's basketball tournament. However, the conference did not receive a bid to the NCAA tournament. They were coached by Ken Trickey in his second season as head coach of the Chiefs. They played their home games at Frederickson Fieldhouse in Oklahoma City, Oklahoma.

== Schedule ==
Date time, TV	Rank^{#}	Opponent^{#}	Result	Record	Site city, state
Regular season
November 28, 1980*		vs. Tulane; Mid-South Classic	L 87–105	0–1	Mid-South Coliseum; Memphis, TN
November 29, 1980*		at Memphis State; Mid-South Classic	L 86–98	0–2	Mid-South Coliseum; Memphis, TN
December 3, 1980*		at Oklahoma	L 82–88	0–3	Lloyd Noble Center; Norman, OK
December 5, 1980*		vs. Colorado State; Shocker Classic	L 45–47	0–4	Levitt Arena; Wichita, KS
December 6, 1980*		vs. McNeese State; Shocker Classic	W 75–68	1–4	Levitt Arena; Wichita, KS
December 13, 1980*		at No. 14 Arkansas	L 70–76	1–5	Barnhill Arena; Fayetteville, AR
December 20, 1980*		Baylor	W 89–61	2–5	Frederickson Fieldhouse; Oklahoma City, OK
December 22, 1980*		at UNLV; Rebel Round-Up	L 76–86	2–6	Las Vegas Convention Center; Las Vegas, NV
December 23, 1980*		TCU; Rebel Round-Up	L 60–73	2–7	Las Vegas Convention Center; Las Vegas
December 27, 1980*		Idaho; All-College Basketball Tournament	L 61–74	2–8	The Myriad; Oklahoma City, OK
December 28, 1980*		Cameron; All-College Basketball Tournament	W 89–61	2–9	The Myriad; Oklahoma City
December 30, 1980*		Kent State; All-College Basketball Tournament	W 101–89	3–9	The Myriad; Oklahoma City, OK
January 3, 1981*		Oklahoma State	L 93–100	3–10	State Fair Arena; Oklahoma City, OK
January 6, 1981*		at Kansas State	L 79–97	3–11	Ahearn Field House; Manhattan, KS
January 10, 1981		Butler	W 108–97	4–11 (1–0)	Frederickson Fieldhouse; Oklahoma City, OK
January 12, 1981		Detroit	W 92–79	5–11 (2–0)	Frederickson Fieldhouse; Oklahoma City, OK
January 14, 1981		Xavier	W 83–65	6–11 (3–0)	Frederickson Fieldhouse; Oklahoma City, OK
January 19, 1981		Evansville	W 83–66	7–11 (4–0)	Frederickson Fieldhouse; Oklahoma City, OK
January 22, 1981		at Xavier	L 73–79	7–12 (4–1)	Schmidt Fieldhouse; Cincinnati, OH
January 24, 1981		at Loyola (IL)	L 86–92	7–13 (4–2)	Rosemont Horizon; Rosemont, IL
January 31, 1981		Oral Roberts	W 96–84	8–13 (5–2)	Frederickson Fieldhouse; Oklahoma City, OK
February 7, 1981		at Evansville	W 83–66	8–14 (5–3)	Roberts Municipal Stadium; Evansville, IN
February 9		Loyola (IL)	W 118–99	9–14 (6–3)	Frederickson Fieldhouse; Oklahoma City, OK
February 14		Oral Roberts	L 98–109	9–15 (6–4)	Mabee Center; Tulsa, OK
February 21		Butler	W 74–65	10–14 (7–4)	Hinkle Fieldhouse; Indianapolis, IN
February 28, 1981*		Southeastern Louisiana	W 101–85	11–15	Frederickson Fieldhouse; Oklahoma City, OK
Midwestern City Conference Tournament
March 3, 1981	(2)	vs. (7) Butler; First Round	W 86–69	12–15	The Myriad; Oklahoma City, OK
March 4, 1981	(2)	vs. (3) Loyola (IL); Semifinal	W 73–71 ^{OT}	13–15	Mabee Center; Tulsa, OK
March 5, 1981	(2)	vs. (1) Xavier; Championship	W 82–76	14–15	Riverfront Coliseum; Cincinnati, OH
*Non-conference game. ^{#}Rankings from AP Poll. (#) Tournament seedings in parentheses. W=West Region. All times are in Central Time.
