= 2008–09 Wright State Raiders men's basketball team =

American college basketball season

2008–09 Wright State Raiders men's basketball
- Conference: Horizon League
- Record: 20–13 (12–6 Horizon)
- Head coach: Brad Brownell (3rd season)
- Associate head coach: Billy Donlon
- Assistant coaches: Mike Winiecki; Victor Ebong
- Home arena: Nutter Center

2008–09 Horizon League men's basketball standings
	Conf.				Overall
Team	W		L	PCT	W		L	PCT
No. 22 Butler	15	–	3	.833	26	–	6	.813
Green Bay	13	–	5	.722	22	–	11	.667
Cleveland State †	12	–	6	.667	26	–	11	.703
Wright State	12	–	6	.667	20	–	13	.606
Milwaukee	11	–	7	.611	17	–	14	.548
UIC	7	–	11	.389	16	–	15	.516
Youngstown State	7	–	11	.389	11	–	19	.367
Loyola Chicago	6	–	12	.333	14	–	18	.438
Valparaiso	5	–	13	.278	9	–	22	.290
Detroit	2	–	16	.111	7	–	23	.233
† Horizon League Tournament winner As of April 1, 2009; Rankings from AP Poll

The 2008–09 Wright State Raiders men's basketball team represented Wright State University in the 2008–09 NCAA Division I men's basketball season. The Raiders, led by head coach Brad Brownell, played their home games at the Nutter Center in Dayton, Ohio, as members of the Horizon League.

== Roster ==
2008–09 Wright State Raiders men's basketball team
Players
Coaches

Pos.	#	Name	Height	Weight	Year	Previous school	Hometown
F	33	Gavin Horne	6 ft 8 in (2.03 m)	220 lb (100 kg)	Sr	Santa Fe CC	Waterloo, Ontario
G	34	Will Graham	6 ft 2 in (1.88 m)	185 lb (84 kg)	Sr	Catholic	Lexington, KY
G	4	John David Gardner	6 ft 4 in (1.93 m)	190 lb (86 kg)	Jr	UNC Wilmington	Homewood, AL
F	5	Cory Cooperwood	6 ft 7 in (2.01 m)	215 lb (98 kg)	Jr	Wallace State CC	Kensett, AR
G	21	Todd Brown	6 ft 5 in (1.96 m)	205 lb (93 kg)	Jr	McKinley	Canton, OH
F	40	Ronnie Thomas	6 ft 9 in (2.06 m)	240 lb (109 kg)	Jr	Duquesne	Middlebury, IN
G	44	Vaughn Duggins	6 ft 3 in (1.91 m)	190 lb (86 kg)	Jr	Pendleton	Pendleton, IN
G	3	Troy Tabler	6 ft 3 in (1.91 m)	185 lb (84 kg)	So	Moeller	Cincinnati, OH
G	11	N'Gai Evans	6 ft 2 in (1.88 m)	165 lb (75 kg)	So	Hoover	North Canton, OH
F	14	Cooper Land	6 ft 8 in (2.03 m)	225 lb (102 kg)	So	Marcus	Highland Village, TX
G	30	Scott Grote	6 ft 6 in (1.98 m)	210 lb (95 kg)	RS So	Duquesne	Centerville, OH
F	15	Kyle Pressley	6 ft 8 in (2.03 m)	225 lb (102 kg)	RS Fr	Concordia Lutheran	Fort Wayne, IN

Head coach

- Brad Brownell (DePauw)

Assistant coach(es)

- Billy Donlon (UNC Wilmington)
- Mike Winiecki (Richmond)
- Victor Ebong (UNC Wilmington)

Legend

- (C) Team captain
- (S) Suspended
- (I) Ineligible
- (W) Walk-on
- Injured
- Current redshirt

== Schedule and results ==
Date time, TV	Rank^{#}	Opponent^{#}	Result	Record	Site city, state
Nov 15, 2008*		Illinois State	L 61–69	0-1	Nutter Center (6,371); Fairborn, OH
Nov 22, 2008*		at Central Michigan	L 68-70 ^{OT}	0–2	Rose Arena (1,242); Mount Pleasant, MI
Nov 24, 2008*		Miami Ohio	L 37-55	0–3	Nutter Center (5,517); Fairborn, OH
Nov 29, 2008*		at Sam Houston State	L 65-84	0–4	Bernard Johnson Coliseum (1,284); Huntsville, TX
Dec 4, 2008		at Green Bay	L 46-57	0-5 (0–1)	Resch Center (2,764); Ashwaubenon, WI
Dec 6, 2008		at Milwaukee	L 59-66	0-6 (0–2)	UW–Milwaukee Panther Arena (2,613); Milwaukee, WI
Dec 9, 2008*		Toledo	W 50-35	1–6	Nutter Center (4,293); Fairborn, OH
Dec 12, 2008*		at Arkansas Little Rock	W 62-55	2–6	Jack Stephens Center (2,985); Little Rock, AR
Dec 14, 2008*		at No. 11 Wake Forest	L 53-66	2–7	Lawrence Joel Veterans Memorial Coliseum (8,904); Winston-Salem, NC
Dec 17, 2008*		Norfolk State	W 66-43	3–7	Nutter Center (3,554); Fairborn, OH
Dec 20, 2008*		vs. Oral Roberts; San Juan Shootout	W 59-46	4–7	(215); San Juan, PR
Dec 21, 2008*		vs. South Florida; San Juan Shootout	W 60-43	5–7	(436); San Juan, PR
Dec 21, 2008*		vs. Murray State; San Juan Shootout	W 57-41	6–7	(230); San Juan, PR
Dec 30, 2008		Cleveland State	W 71-62	7-7 (1–2)	Nutter Center (5,394); Fairborn, OH
Jan 3, 2009		Youngstown State	W 60-59	8-7 (2–2)	Nutter Center (4,115); Fairborn, OH
Jan 8, 2009		at No. 20 Butler	L 48-64	8-8 (2–3)	Hinkle Fieldhouse (4,773); Indianapolis
Jan 10, 2009		at Valparaiso	W 64-48	9–8 (3–3)	Athletics–Recreation Center (2,653); Valparaiso, IN
Jan 16, 2009		at Detroit Mercy	W 60–51	10-8 (4-3)	Calihan Hall (2,369); Detroit, MI
Jan 22, 2009		Loyola	W 68-47	11-8 (5–3)	Nutter Center (4,887); Fairborn, OH
Jan 24, 2009		UIC	W 57-31	12-8 (6–3)	Nutter Center (5,819); Fairborn, OH
Jan 29, 2009		at Youngstown State	W 67-61	13-8 (7-3)	Beeghly Center (1,844); Youngstown, OH
Jan 31, 2009		at Cleveland State	L 50-59	13-9 (7–4)	Wolstein Center (3,590); Cleveland, OH
Feb 5, 2009		Valparaiso	W 68–58	14–9 (8–4)	Nutter Center (5,618); Fairborn, OH
Feb 7, 2009		No. 11 Butler	L 51-69	14–10 (8–5)	Nutter Center (9,735); Fairborn, OH
Feb 10, 2009		at Loyola	W 64-52	15-10 (9–5)	Gentile Event Center (1,219); Chicago, IL
Feb 14, 2009		Detroit Mercy	W 61–48	16-10 (10-5)	Nutter Center (5,891); Fairborn, OH
Feb 18, 2009		at UIC	L 66-77 ^{OT}	16-11 (10–6)	UIC Pavilion (3,742); Chicago, IL
Feb 21, 2009*		Northeastern; ESPNU BracketBusters	L 57-69	16-12	Nutter Center (5,301); Fairborn, OH
Feb 26, 2009		Milwaukee	W 70-60	17-12 (11–6)	Nutter Center (4,746); Fairborn, OH
Feb 28, 2009		Green Bay	W 65-64	18-12 (12–6)	Nutter Center (6,465); Fairborn, OH
Horizon League Tournament
Mar 3, 2009	(4)	(9) Valparaiso; First Round	W 68-56	19-12	Nutter Center (3,006); Fairborn, OH
Mar 6, 2009	(4)	vs. (5) Milwaukee; Second Round	W 80-70	20–12	Hinkle Fieldhouse (1,014); Indianapolis
Mar 7, 2009	(4)	at (1) No. 22 Butler; Semifinals	L 57-62	20–13	Hinkle Fieldhouse (6,477); Indianapolis
*Non-conference game. ^{#}Rankings from AP Poll. (#) Tournament seedings in parentheses. MW=Midwest.

== Awards and honors ==
Todd Brown	MVP
Cory Cooperwood	Raider Award
Todd Brown	Second Team All Horizon League
Will Graham	Horizon League All Defensive Team

== Statistics ==
Number	Name	Games	Average	Points	Assists	Rebounds
21	Todd Brown	32	11.7	387	47	161
5	Cory Cooperwood	33	9.5	313	23	178
11	N'Gai Evans	33	6.4	211	56	77
4	John David Gardner	21	8.7	183	65	50
34	Will Graham	33	5.4	179	90	112
3	Troy Tabler	27	5.9	160	23	67
30	Scott Grote	30	5.1	153	32	74
14	Cooper Land	33	4.2	140	11	64
40	Ronnie Thomas	32	3.9	125	11	84
33	Gavin Horne	31	2.8	86	7	53
44	Vaughn Duggins	4	11.8	47	6	17
15	Kyle Pressley	19	0.6	11	2	25
12	Michael Boan	4	0.0	0	0	0
