= 1988–89 Evansville Purple Aces men's basketball team =

American college basketball season

1988–89 Evansville Purple Aces men's basketball

MCC Regular season champions

1989 NCAA tournament, second round
- Conference: Midwestern Collegiate Conference
- Record: 25–6 (10–2 MCC)
- Head coach: Jim Crews
- Assistant coach: Will Rey
- Home arena: Roberts Municipal Stadium

1988–89 Midwestern Collegiate Conference men's basketball standings
	Conf.				Overall
Team	W		L	PCT	W		L	PCT
Evansville	10	–	2	.833	25	–	6	.806
Saint Louis	8	–	4	.667	27	–	10	.730
Xavier †	7	–	5	.583	21	–	12	.636
Dayton	6	–	6	.500	12	–	17	.414
Detroit Mercy	4	–	8	.333	7	–	21	.250
Loyola (IL)	4	–	8	.333	11	–	17	.393
Butler	3	–	9	.250	11	–	17	.393
† 1989 MCC tournament winner Rankings from AP Poll

The 1988–89 Evansville Purple Aces men's basketball team represented the University of Evansville in the 1988–89 NCAA Division I men's basketball season. Their head coach was Jim Crews and they played their home games at the Ford Center as members of the Midwestern Collegiate Conference. After winning the MCC regular season championship, the Purple Aces received an at-large bid to the 1989 NCAA tournament. They defeated Oregon State in the opening round before losing to the eventual National runner-up, Seton Hall, in the second round.

== Roster ==
1988–89 Evansville Purple Aces men's basketball team
Players
Coaches

Pos.	#	Name	Height	Weight	Year	Hometown
G	3	Scott Haffner	6 ft 3 in (1.91 m)	175 lb (79 kg)	Sr	Noblesville, IN
C	53	Dan Godfread	6 ft 10 in (2.08 m)	245 lb (111 kg)	Jr	Fort Wayne, IN
C		Olaf Blab	7 ft 0 in (2.13 m)	—	Sr	Munich, Germany
F		Chris Bomba	6 ft 7 in (2.01 m)	—	Sr	Bloomington, Indiana
F		Larry Brand	6 ft 7 in (2.01 m)	—	Jr
G		Chaka Chandler	6 ft 4 in (1.93 m)	—	Fr
G		Reed Crafton	5 ft 10 in (1.78 m)	—	Jr
G		Milt Donald	6 ft 4 in (1.93 m)	—	Jr
F		Brian Hill	6 ft 7 in (2.01 m)	—	Jr
G		Troy Jones	6 ft 2 in (1.88 m)	—	Sr
F		Chris Mack	6 ft 5 in (1.96 m)	—	Fr	North College Hill, Ohio
F		Jeff Morning	6 ft 9 in (2.06 m)	—	Jr
G		Scott Shreffler	6 ft 2 in (1.88 m)	—	Fr

Head coach

- Jim Crews (Indiana)

Assistant coach(es)

Legend

- (C) Team captain
- (S) Suspended
- (I) Ineligible
- (W) Walk-on
- Injured
- Current redshirt

== Schedule ==
Date time, TV	Rank^{#}	Opponent^{#}	Result	Record	Site (attendance) city, state
Regular season
Nov 27, 1988*		at Valparaiso	W 75–56	1–0	Athletics-Recreation Center; Valparaiso, Indiana
Nov 30, 1988*		at Southern Illinois	L 71–73	1–1	SIU Arena; Carbondale, Illinois
Dec 5, 1988*		Wisconsin-Green Bay	W 68–60	2–1	Roberts Stadium; Evansville, Indiana
Dec 7, 1988*		at Wake Forest	L 73–79	2–2	Winston-Salem Memorial Coliseum; Winston-Salem, North Carolina
Dec 10, 1988*		Austin Peay	W 89–72	3–2	Roberts Stadium; Evansville, Indiana
Dec 12, 1988*		Indiana State	W 94–75	4–2	Roberts Stadium; Evansville, Indiana
Dec 20, 1988*		Bucknell	W 79–54	5–2	Roberts Stadium; Evansville, Indiana
Dec 23, 1988*		Wyoming	W 84–63	6–2	Roberts Stadium; Evansville, Indiana
Dec 29, 1988*		Siena	W 79–70	7–2	Roberts Municipal Stadium; Evansville, Indiana
Dec 31, 1988*		at Murray State	W 78–70	8–2	Racer Arena; Murray, Kentucky
Jan 3, 1989*		Alcorn State	W 81–44	9–2	Roberts Stadium; Evansville, Indiana
Jan 10, 1989*		at Toledo	W 61–59	10–2	John F. Savage Hall; Toledo, Ohio
Jan 14, 1989		Butler	W 61–45	11–2 (1–0)	Roberts Stadium; Evansville, Indiana
Jan 19, 1989		at Xavier	L 73–81	11–3 (1–1)	Cincinnati Gardens; Cincinnati, Ohio
Jan 21, 1989		at Dayton	W 83–65	12–3 (2–1)	University of Dayton Arena; Dayton, Ohio
Jan 26, 1989		Detroit Mercy	W 80–63	13–3 (3–1)	Roberts Stadium; Evansville, Indiana
Jan 28, 1989		Loyola (IL)	W 89–76	14–3 (4–1)	Roberts Stadium; Evansville, Indiana
Feb 4, 1989		Saint Louis	W 98–66	15–3 (5–1)	Roberts Stadium; Evansville, Indiana
Feb 6, 1989*		Southern Illinois	W 89–87	16–3	Roberts Stadium; Evansville, Indiana
Feb 11, 1989		at Butler	W 90–77	17–3 (6–1)	Hinkle Fieldhouse; Indianapolis, Indiana
Feb 13, 1989*		at Cincinnati	W 83–69	18–3	Cincinnati Gardens; Cincinnati, Ohio
Feb 16, 1989		Xavier	W 88–82	19–3 (7–1)	Roberts Stadium; Evansville, Indiana
Feb 18, 1989		Dayton	W 109–83	20–3 (8–1)	Roberts Stadium; Evansville, Indiana
Feb 23, 1989		at Detroit Mercy	W 85–71	21–3 (9–1)	Calihan Hall; Detroit, Michigan
Feb 25, 1989		at Loyola (IL)	W 115–104	22–3 (10–1)	International Amphitheatre; Chicago, Illinois
Feb 27, 1989*		Ohio	W 95–69	23–3	Roberts Stadium; Evansville, Indiana
Mar 4, 1989		at Saint Louis	L 61–72	23–4 (10–2)	Kiel Auditorium; St. Louis, Missouri
MCC tournament
Mar 10, 1989*		at Dayton; MCC Tournament Semifinal	W 84–79 ^{OT}	24–4	UD Arena; Dayton, Ohio
Mar 11, 1989*		vs. Xavier; MCC tournament championship	L 78–85	24–5	UD Arena; Dayton, Ohio
NCAA tournament
Mar 17, 1989*	(11 W)	vs. (6 W) Oregon State; First Round	W 94–90 ^{OT}	25–5	McKale Center; Tucson, Arizona
Mar 19, 1989*	(11 W)	vs. (3 W) No. 11 Seton Hall; Second Round	L 73–87	25–6	McKale Center (13,391); Tucson, Arizona
*Non-conference game. ^{#}Rankings from AP Poll. (#) Tournament seedings in parentheses. All times are in Central Standard Time.

== NBA draft ==
Round	Pick	Player	NBA Club
2	45	Scott Haffner	Miami Heat
