= 2008–09 Valparaiso Crusaders men's basketball team =

American college basketball season

2008–09 Valparaiso Crusaders men's basketball
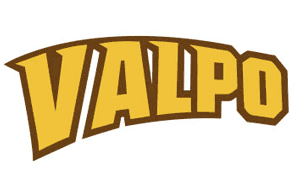
- Conference: Horizon League
- Record: 9–22 (5–13 Horizon)
- Head coach: Homer Drew
- Assistant coaches: Bryce Drew; Luke Gore; Chris Sparks
- Home arena: Athletics-Recreation Center

2008–09 Horizon League men's basketball standings
	Conf.				Overall
Team	W		L	PCT	W		L	PCT
No. 22 Butler	15	–	3	.833	26	–	6	.813
Green Bay	13	–	5	.722	22	–	11	.667
Cleveland State †	12	–	6	.667	26	–	11	.703
Wright State	12	–	6	.667	20	–	13	.606
Milwaukee	11	–	7	.611	17	–	14	.548
UIC	7	–	11	.389	16	–	15	.516
Youngstown State	7	–	11	.389	11	–	19	.367
Loyola Chicago	6	–	12	.333	14	–	18	.438
Valparaiso	5	–	13	.278	9	–	22	.290
Detroit	2	–	16	.111	7	–	23	.233
† Horizon League Tournament winner As of April 1, 2009; Rankings from AP Poll

The 2008–09 Valparaiso Crusaders men's basketball team was an NCAA Division I college basketball team competing in the Horizon League.

== Coaching staff ==
- Homer Drew – Head coach
- Bryce Drew – Associate head coach
- Luke Gore – Assistant coach
- Chris Sparks – Assistant coach
- Pawel Mrozik – Director of Basketball Operations

== Roster ==
Note: Flags indicate national team eligibility at FIBA sanctioned events. Players may hold other non-FIBA nationality not displayed.

No.		Position	Player
00	(United States)	F	Urule Igbavboa
1	(Jamaica)	G	Michael Rogers
2	(Germany)	F	Benjamin Fumey
3	(United States)	G	De'Andre Haskins
4	(United States)	F	Cory Johnson
5	(Australia)	F	Cameron Witt

No.		Position	Player
10	(United States)	G	Brandon McPherson
11	(United States)	G	Nick Shelton
12	(United States)	G	Andrew Ferry
14	(United States)	G	Howard Little
15	(United States)	G	Erik Buggs
22	(United States)	G	Logan Jones
33	(United States)	G	Jake Diebler

== Schedule ==
Date time, TV	Rank^{#}	Opponent^{#}	Result	Record	Site city, state
Exhibition
11/08/08*; 7:30pm		Elmhurst; Exhibition	W 85–63	—	Athletics-Recreation Center; Valparaiso, IN
Regular season
11/15/08*; 7:30pm		Marian	W 87–56	1–0	Athletics-Recreation Center (3,396); Valparaiso, IN
11/18/08*; 7:05pm		UCF	W 69–52	2–0	Athletics-Recreation Center (2,764); Valparaiso, IN
11/21/08*; 2:30pm		vs. San Diego; Paradise Jam tournament	L 66–73	2–1	Sports and Fitness Center (3,095); Saint Thomas, U.S. Virgin Islands
11/22/08*; 7:30pm		vs. Iona; Paradise Jam tournament	L 55–75	2–2	Sports and Fitness Center (2,257); Saint Thomas, U.S. Virgin Islands
11/24/08*; 12:00pm		vs. La Salle; Paradise Jam tournament	L 70–75 ^{OT}	2–3	Sports and Fitness Center (633); Saint Thomas, U.S. Virgin Islands
12/02/08; 6:00pm		at Cleveland State	L 42–66	2–4 (0–1)	Wolstein Center (1,574); Cleveland, OH
12/04/08; 6:05pm, MY-YTV		at Youngstown State	W 68–57	3–4 (1–1)	Beeghly Center (1,667); Youngstown, OH
12/10/08*; 8:00pm		IPFW	W 63–46	3–5	Athletics-Recreation Center (2,689); Valparaiso, IN
12/13/08*; 3:00pm		at Miami (OH)	L 50–62	3–6	Millett Hall (2,467); Oxford, OH
12/20/08*; 1:00pm, ESPNU		vs. No. 1 North Carolina	L 63–85	3–7	United Center (10,645); Chicago, IL
12/22/08*; 6:00pm		at UCF	L 60–85	3–8	UCF Arena (3,170); Orlando, FL
12/28/08*; 3:00pm, BTN		at No. 15 Purdue	L 45–59	3–9	Mackey Arena (13,916); West Lafayette, IN
12/30/08*; 7:05pm		North Park	W 78–47	4–9	Athletics-Recreation Center (2,062); Valparaiso, IN
01/03/09; 7:05pm, WYIN		Butler	L 62–75	4–10 (1–2)	Athletics-Recreation Center (4,737); Valparaiso, IN
01/05/09; 7:00pm		at Milwaukee	L 47–61	4–11 (1–3)	U.S. Cellular Arena (3,006); Milwaukee, WI
01/08/09; 7:05pm		Detroit	W 64–41	5–11 (2–3)	Athletics-Recreation Center (2,452); Valparaiso, IN
01/10/09; 7:05pm, WYIN		Wright State	L 48–64	5–12 (2–4)	Athletics-Recreation Center (2,653); Valparaiso, IN
01/15/09; 7:00pm		at UIC	L 52–77	5–13 (2–5)	UIC Pavilion (3,323); Chicago, IL
01/17/09; 3:00pm, WYIN		at Loyola Chicago	L 56–71	5–14 (2–6)	Joseph J. Gentile Center (3,906); Chicago, IL
01/22/09; 7:05pm, WYIN/Time Warner Cable Sports 32		Milwaukee	W 63–51	6–14 (3–6)	Athletics-Recreation Center (2,621); Valparaiso, IN
01/24/09; 7:05pm, WYIN		at Green Bay	L 76–83	6–15 (3–7)	Athletics-Recreation Center (4,274); Valparaiso, IN
01/30/09; 6:00pm, ESPNU		at No. 13 Butler	L 51–59	6–16 (3–8)	Hinkle Fieldhouse (6,623); Indianapolis, IN
02/05/09; 6:00pm		at Wright State	L 58–68	6–17 (3–9)	Nutter Center (5,618); Dayton, OH
02/07/09; 3:00pm		at Detroit	L 55–56	6–18 (3–10)	Calihan Hall (1,986); Detroit, MI
02/13/09; 7:05pm, WYIN		Loyola Chicago	W 71–47	7–18 (4–10)	Athletics-Recreation Center (3,196); Valparaiso, IN
02/15/09; 3:00pm, WYIN		UIC	L 76–83	7–19 (4–11)	Athletics-Recreation Center (3,315); Valparaiso, IN
02/18/09; 7:00pm		at Green Bay	L 61–76	7–20 (4–12)	Resch Center (4,323); Green Bay, WI
02/21/09*		Akron; ESPNU BracketBusters	W 74–66	8–20	Athletics-Recreation Center (2,479); Valparaiso, IN
02/26/08; 7:30pm		Cleveland State	L 64–71	8–21 (4–13)	Athletics-Recreation Center (2,385); Valparaiso, IN
02/28/09; 7:05pm		Youngstown State	W 67–59	9–21 (5–13)	Athletics-Recreation Center (2,598); Valparaiso, IN
Horizon League tournament
03/03/09; 6:00 pm	(9)	at (4) Wright State; Horizon League men's basketball tournament	L 56–68	9–22	Nutter Center (3,006); Dayton, OH
*Non-conference game. ^{#}Rankings from Coaches' Poll. (#) Tournament seedings in parentheses. All times are in Central Time.
