= 2008–09 Milwaukee Panthers men's basketball team =

American college basketball season

2008–09 Milwaukee Panthers men's basketball
- Conference: Horizon League
- Record: 17–14 (11–7 Horizon League)
- Head coach: Rob Jeter (4th season)
- Assistant coaches: Duffy Conroy (5th season); Chad Boudreau (4th season); Brian Bidlingmyer
- Home arena: US Cellular Arena

2008–09 Horizon League men's basketball standings
| | Conf. | | | | Overall |
| Team | W | | L | PCT | W | | L | PCT |
|---|---|---|---|---|---|---|---|---|
| No. 22 Butler | 15 | – | 3 | .833 | 26 | – | 6 | .813 |
| Green Bay | 13 | – | 5 | .722 | 22 | – | 11 | .667 |
| Cleveland State † | 12 | – | 6 | .667 | 26 | – | 11 | .703 |
| Wright State | 12 | – | 6 | .667 | 20 | – | 13 | .606 |
| Milwaukee | 11 | – | 7 | .611 | 17 | – | 14 | .548 |
| UIC | 7 | – | 11 | .389 | 16 | – | 15 | .516 |
| Youngstown State | 7 | – | 11 | .389 | 11 | – | 19 | .367 |
| Loyola Chicago | 6 | – | 12 | .333 | 14 | – | 18 | .438 |
| Valparaiso | 5 | – | 13 | .278 | 9 | – | 22 | .290 |
| Detroit | 2 | – | 16 | .111 | 7 | – | 23 | .233 |
† Horizon League Tournament winner As of April 1, 2009; Rankings from AP Poll

== Recruits ==
The following is a list of commitments Milwaukee received for the 2008–09 season:

- Riley Walker
- James Eayrs
- Tone Boyle
- Tony Meier
- Burleigh Porte
- Ryan Haggerty
- Patrick Souter
- Jerard Ajami
- James Dean

== Roster ==
Milwaukee Men's Basketball; 2008–2009 Roster
Head coach: Rob Jeter
| G | 0 | Avery Smith | Senior | 6'3", 175 lb | (Milwaukee, Wis) |
| G | 1 | Charlie Swiggett | Junior | 6'1", 180 lb | (Chester, Pa) |
| G | 2 | Deonte Roberts | Sophomore | 6'3", 190 lb | (St. Paul, Minn) |
| F | 3 | Riley Walker | Freshman | 6'6", 210 lb | (McFarland, Wis) |
| G | 4 | Deion James | Senior | 6'2", 190 lb | (Milwaukee, Wis) |
| G | 5 | Ricky Franklin | Senior | 6'2", 200 lb | (Milwaukee, Wis) |
| G | 10 | Zach Holt | Junior | 5'6", 160 lb | (Pulaski, Tenn) |
| G | 11 | Tone Boyle | Junior | 6'2", 175 lb | (Middleton, Wis) |
| G | 15 | Patrick Souter | Freshman | 6'0", 170 lb | (Racine, Wis) |
| G | 20 | James Dean | Freshman | 6'3", 190 lb | (Las Vegas, Nev) |
| F | 21 | Tony Meier | Freshman | 6'8", 210 lb | (Wildwood, Mo) |
| G | 22 | Kaylan Anderson | Junior | 6'5", 195 lb | (Toronto, Ontario) |
| F | 23 | Anthony Hill | Sophomore | 6'7", 230 lb | (Milwaukee, Wis) |
| G | 30 | Jerard Ajami | Junior | 6'2", 180 lb | (Madison, Wis) |
| F | 42 | Burleigh Porte | Junior | 6'8", 210 lb | (Monrovia, Liberia) |
| F | 44 | Ryan Haggerty | Freshman | 6'8", 210 lb | (Glen Ellyn, Ill) |
| F | 52 | Jason Averkamp | Junior | 6'6", 230 lb | (New Berlin, Wis) |
| F | 55 | James Eayrs | Junior | 6'7", 340 lb | (Roseville, Minn) |

=== Coaching staff ===
| Name | Type | College |
|---|---|---|
| Rob Jeter | Head coach | University of Wisconsin–Platteville |
| Brian Bidlingmyer | Assistant coach | Siena College |
| Chad Boudreau | Assistant coach | Hannibal-LaGrange College |
| Duffy Conroy | Assistant coach | St. Ambrose University |
| Ronnie Jones | Director of Basketball Operations | University of Wisconsin–Milwaukee |
| Chip MacKenzie | Video Coordinator | Edgewood College |
| Dave Bugalski | Athletic trainer | University of Wisconsin–Milwaukee |

== Schedule ==
Horizon League Standing: 5th
| **Date** | **Opponent*** | **Rank*** | **Location** | Result | **Overall** | **Conference** | **Television** |
**Regular Season Games**
| November 14, 2008 | Loyola Marymount | | Ames, IA | W 75–51 | 1–0 | | |
| November 15, 2008 | UC Davis | | Ames, IA | W 81–75 | 2–0 | | |
| November 16, 2008 | Iowa State | | Ames, IA | L 79–61 | 2–1 | | |
| November 19, 2008 | Upper Iowa University | | Milwaukee, WI | W 87–59 | 3–1 | | Horizon league Network |
| November 22, 2008 | #15 Marquette | | Bradley Center | L 100–80 | 3–2 | | Sports 32 |
| November 25, 2008 | Ball State | | Milwaukee, WI | L 82–69 | 3–3 | | Horizon league Network |
| November 29, 2008 | #25 Wisconsin | | Madison, WI | L 67–46 | 3–4 | | Big Ten Network |
| December 4, 2008 | **Detroit** | | Milwaukee, WI | W 71–62 | 4–4 | 1–0 | Horizon league Network |
| December 6, 2008 | **Wright State** | | Milwaukee, WI | W 66–59 | 5–4 | 2–0 | Horizon league Network |
| December 11, 2008 | Miami (OH) | | Oxford, OH | L 69–45 | 5–5 | 2–0 | Sports 32 |
| December 20, 2008 | Bradley | | Milwaukee, WI | W 86–74 | 6–5 | 2–0 | Horizon league Network |
| December 30, 2008 | **UIC** | | Chicago, IL | W 71–66 | 7–5 | 3–0 | Sports 32 |
| January 3, 2009 | **Loyola** | | Chicago, IL | W 80–66 | 8–5 | 4–0 | Sports 32 |
| January 5, 2009 | **Valparaiso** | | Milwaukee, WI | W 61–47 | 9–5 | 5–0 | Horizon league Network |
| January 9, 2009 | **UW–Green Bay** | | Milwaukee, WI | L 77–75 | 9–6 | 5–1 | ESPNU |
| January 12, 2009 | SIU-Edwardsville | | Milwaukee, WI | W 70–59 | 10–6 | 5–1 | Horizon league Network |
| January 15, 2009 | **Youngstown State** | | Milwaukee, WI | W 69–50 | 11–6 | 6–1 | Horizon league Network |
| January 17, 2009 | **Cleveland State** | | Milwaukee, WI | W 77–75 | 12–6 | 7–1 | Horizon league Network |
| January 22, 2009 | **Valparaiso** | | Valparaiso, IN | L 63–51 | 12–7 | 7–2 | Sports 32 |
| January 24, 2009 | #16 **Butler** | | Indianapolis, IN | L 78–48 | 12–8 | 7–3 | Sports 32 |
| January 28, 2009 | **Loyola** | | Milwaukee, WI | W 72–58 | 13–8 | 8–3 | Horizon league Network |
| January 31, 2009 | **UIC** | | Milwaukee, WI | W 63–62 | 14–8 | 9–3 | Horizon league Network |
| February 7, 2009 | **UW–Green Bay** | | Green Bay, WI | L 72–68 | 14–9 | 9–4 | Sports 32 |
| February 12, 2009 | **Cleveland State** | | Cleveland, OH | L 70–61 | 14–10 | 9–5 | Sports 32 |
| February 14, 2009 | **Youngstown State** | | Youngstown, OH | L 70–68 | 14–11 | 9–6 | Sports 32 |
| February 18, 2009 | #21 **Butler** | | Milwaukee, WI | W 63–60 | 15–11 | 10–6 | Sports 32 |
| February 21, 2009 | North Dakota State | | Milwaukee, WI | L 77–69 | 15–12 | 10–6 | Horizon league Network |
| February 26, 2009 | **Wright State** | | Dayton, OH | L 70–60 | 15–13 | 10–7 | Sports 32 |
| February 28, 2009 | **Detroit** | | Detroit, MI | W 68–63 | 16–13 | 11–7 | Sports 32 |
**Horizon League tournament**
| March 3, 2009 | **Loyola** | | Milwaukee, WI | W 77–68 | 17–13 | | Horizon league Network |
| March 6, 2009 | **Wright State** | | Indianapolis, IN | L 80–70 | 17–14 | | Horizon league Network |
*Rank according to AP Top 25 Poll. ^{#}All times are in EST. Conference games in **bold**.

== Player stats ==
Updated as of March 20, 2009.
Showing only the Top 5 statistic leaders.

| Player | GP | MPG | FG% | 3FG% | FT% | RPG | APG | SPG | BPG | PPG |
|---|---|---|---|---|---|---|---|---|---|---|
| Tone Boyle | 30 | 35.5 | .375 | .361 | .768 | 3.1 | 1.1 | 0.8 | 0.2 | 13.2 |
| Avery Smith | 29 | 30.1 | .397 | .295 | .655 | 5.2 | 3.1 | 1.2 | 0.3 | 11.4 |
| James Eayrs | 31 | 23.4 | .414 | .336 | .849 | 5.5 | 1.2 | 0.7 | 0.3 | 11.2 |
| Ricky Franklin | 30 | 30.0 | .384 | .391 | .691 | 4.6 | 2.5 | 0.9 | 0.2 | 9.1 |
| Tony Meier | 30 | 22.4 | .364 | .340 | .778 | 4.4 | 0.7 | 0.1 | 0.5 | 6.7 |
| Deonte Roberts | 29 | 20.3 | .512 | 1.000 | .658 | 3.7 | 1.6 | 0.7 | 0.3 | 6.4 |

== 2009 Horizon League Tournament ==
First Round; Tuesday, March 3
4 | Wright State | 68
9 | Valparaiso | 56
5 | Milwaukee | 77
8 | Loyola Chicago | 68
3 | Cleveland State | 56
10 | Detroit | 43
6 | UIC | 73
7 | Youngstown State | 68

Second Round; Friday, March 6
4 | Wright State | 80
5 | Milwaukee | 70
3 | Cleveland State | 67
6 | UIC | 64

Semifinals; Saturday, March 7
1 | Butler | 62
4 | Wright State | 57
2 | Green Bay | 67
3 | Cleveland State | 73

Final; Tuesday, March 10
1 | Butler | 54
3 | Cleveland State | 57

First round games at campus sites of higher seeds
Second round and semifinals will be hosted by Butler. Championship will be hosted by higher-numbered remaining seed
