= 1985–86 Xavier Musketeers men's basketball team =

American college basketball season

1985–86 Xavier Musketeers men's basketball

MCC Regular season champions MCC tournament champions

NCAA tournament
- Conference: Midwestern Collegiate Conference
- Record: 25–5 (10–2 MCC)
- Head coach: Pete Gillen (1st season)
- Home arena: Cincinnati Gardens

1985–86 Midwestern Collegiate Conference men's basketball standings
	Conf.				Overall
Team	W		L	PCT	W		L	PCT
Xavier †	10	–	2	.833	25	–	5	.833
Saint Louis	8	–	4	.667	18	–	12	.600
Detroit	7	–	5	.583	14	–	15	.483
Loyola (IL)	7	–	5	.583	13	–	16	.448
Oral Roberts	5	–	7	.417	10	–	18	.357
Evansville	3	–	9	.250	8	–	19	.296
Butler	2	–	10	.167	9	–	19	.321
† 1986 MCC tournament winner

The 1985–86 Xavier Musketeers men's basketball team represented Xavier University from Cincinnati, Ohio in the 1985–86 season. Led by head coach Pete Gillen, the Musketeers finished with a 25–5 record (10–2 MCC), and won MCC regular season and MCC tournament titles to receive an automatic bid to the NCAA tournament. In the NCAA tournament, the Musketeers lost to No. 5 seed Alabama in the opening round.

== Roster ==
1985–86 Xavier Musketeers men's basketball team
Players	Coaches
Pos. / # / Name / Height / Weight / Year / Hometown; SG / 23 / Byron Larkin / 6 ft 3 in (1.91 m) / 185 lb (84 kg) / So / Cincinnati, Ohio	Head coach: Pete Gillen (Fairfield); Assistant coach(es) Legend: (C) Team captain; (S) Suspended; (I) Ineligible; (W) Walk-on; Injured; Current redshirt

== Schedule and results ==
Date time, TV	Rank^{#}	Opponent^{#}	Result	Record	Site city, state
Regular season
Nov 22, 1985*		Huntington	W 100–51	1–0	Cincinnati Gardens; Cincinnati, Ohio
Nov 24, 1985*		Southeastern Louisiana	W 91–75	2–0	Cincinnati Gardens; Cincinnati, Ohio
Dec 4, 1985*		at Creighton	W 56–53	3–0	Omaha Civic Auditorium; Omaha, Nebraska
Dec 7, 1985*		Pittsburgh	W 83–73	4–0	Cincinnati Gardens; Cincinnati, Ohio
Dec 10, 1985*		at Eastern Michigan	W 83–61	5–0	
Dec 14, 1985*		at Miami (OH)	L 74–80	5–1	Millett Hall; Oxford, Ohio
Dec 21, 1985*		Wayne State	W 84–69	6–1	Cincinnati Gardens; Cincinnati, Ohio
Dec 28, 1985*		Providence	W 85–73	7–1	Cincinnati Gardens; Cincinnati, Ohio
Jan 2, 1986*		at Stetson	W 77–70	8–1	
Jan 4, 1986*		at South Florida	L 52–57	8–2	
Jan 8, 1986*		Saint Peter's (NJ)	W 67–46	9–2	Cincinnati Gardens; Cincinnati, Ohio
Jan 11, 1986		Detroit	L 72–76	9–3 (0–1)	Cincinnati Gardens; Cincinnati, Ohio
Jan 13, 1986		Loyola–Chicago	W 78–75	10–3 (1–1)	Cincinnati Gardens; Cincinnati, Ohio
Jan 18, 1986		at Saint Louis	W 72–60	11–3 (2–1)	
Jan 20, 1986		at Evansville	W 78–69	12–3 (3–1)	Roberts Stadium; Evansville, Indiana
Jan 23, 1986*		Cincinnati	W 80–76	13–3	Cincinnati Gardens; Cincinnati, Ohio
Jan 25, 1986		Oral Roberts	W 86–74	14–3 (4–1)	Cincinnati Gardens; Cincinnati, Ohio
Jan 29, 1986*		at Duquesne	W 71–68	15–3	
Feb 1, 1986		Butler	W 77–56	16–3 (5–1)	Cincinnati Gardens; Cincinnati, Ohio
Feb 5, 1986*		at Marquette	W 85–71	17–3	MECCA Arena; Milwaukee, Wisconsin
Feb 8, 1986		at Detroit	L 71–80	17–4 (5–2)	
Feb 10, 1986		at Loyola–Chicago	W 91–88 ^{OT}	18–4 (6–2)	
Feb 15, 1986		Saint Louis	W 81–72 ^{OT}	19–4 (7–2)	Cincinnati Gardens; Cincinnati, Ohio
Feb 17, 1986		Evansville	W 81–72	20–4 (8–2)	Cincinnati Gardens; Cincinnati, Ohio
Feb 20, 1986		at Butler	W 86–81	21–4 (9–2)	
Feb 22, 1986		at Oral Roberts	W 73–71	22–4 (10–2)	
Feb 25, 1986*		Dayton	W 93–78	23–4	Cincinnati Gardens; Cincinnati, Ohio
Midwestern Collegiate Conference tournament
Feb 28, 1986*		vs. Loyola–Chicago; Semifinals	W 99–91	24–4	Market Square Arena; Indianapolis, Indiana
Mar 1, 1986*		vs. Saint Louis; Championship game	W 74–66	25–4	Market Square Arena; Indianapolis, Indiana
NCAA Tournament
Mar 14, 1986*	(12 SE)	vs. (5 SE) Alabama; First Round	L 80–97	25–5	Charlotte Coliseum; Charlotte, North Carolina
*Non-conference game. ^{#}Rankings from AP Poll. (#) Tournament seedings in parentheses. SE=Southeast. All times are in Eastern Time.
