= 1988–89 Xavier Musketeers men's basketball team =

American college basketball season

1988–89 Xavier Musketeers men's basketball

MCC tournament champions

NCAA tournament
- Conference: Midwestern Collegiate Conference
- Record: 21–12 (7–5 MCC)
- Head coach: Pete Gillen (4th season)
- Assistant coach: Dino Gaudio (2nd season)
- Home arena: Cincinnati Gardens

1988–89 Midwestern Collegiate Conference men's basketball standings
	Conf.				Overall
Team	W		L	PCT	W		L	PCT
Evansville	10	–	2	.833	25	–	6	.806
Saint Louis	8	–	4	.667	27	–	10	.730
Xavier †	7	–	5	.583	21	–	12	.636
Dayton	6	–	6	.500	12	–	17	.414
Detroit Mercy	4	–	8	.333	7	–	21	.250
Loyola (IL)	4	–	8	.333	11	–	17	.393
Butler	3	–	9	.250	11	–	17	.393
† 1989 MCC tournament winner Rankings from AP Poll

The 1988–89 Xavier Musketeers men's basketball team represented Xavier University from Cincinnati, Ohio in the 1988–89 season. Led by head coach Pete Gillen, the Musketeers finished with a 21–12 record (7–5 MCC), and won the MCC tournament to receive an automatic bid to the NCAA tournament. In the NCAA tournament, the Musketeers lost to the eventual National champion, Michigan, in the opening round.

== Roster ==
1988–89 Xavier Musketeers men's basketball team
Players
Coaches

Pos.	#	Name	Height	Weight	Year	Hometown
G	10	Jamal Walker	5 ft 11 in (1.8 m)	—	So
PG	11	Stan Kimbrough	5 ft 11 in (1.8 m)	150 lb (68 kg)	Sr	Cleveland, Ohio
F	33	Derek Strong	6 ft 8 in (2.03 m)	215 lb (98 kg)	So	Los Angeles, California
F	42	Tyrone Hill	6 ft 9 in (2.06 m)	235 lb (107 kg)	Jr	Cincinnati, Ohio

Head coach

- Pete Gillen (Fairfield)

Assistant coach(es)

Legend

- (C) Team captain
- (S) Suspended
- (I) Ineligible
- (W) Walk-on
- Injured
- Current redshirt

== Schedule and results ==
Date time, TV	Rank^{#}	Opponent^{#}	Result	Record	Site city, state
Regular season
Nov 18, 1988*		vs. No. 4 Louisville; Preseason NIT	W 85–83	1–0	Riverfront Coliseum; Cincinnati, Ohio
Nov 20, 1988*		at No. 14 Missouri; Preseason NIT	L 71–83	1–1	Hearnes Center; Columbia, Missouri
Nov 28, 1988*		Marietta College	W 109–58	2–1	Cincinnati Gardens; Cincinnati, Ohio
Dec 3, 1988*		Air Force	W 73–64	3–1	Cincinnati Gardens; Cincinnati, Ohio
Dec 7, 1988*		Robert Morris	W 87–76	4–1	Cincinnati Gardens; Cincinnati, Ohio
Dec 10, 1988*		Miami (OH)	L 61–68	4–2	Cincinnati Gardens; Cincinnati, Ohio
Dec 19, 1988*		at Eastern Illinois	L 70–85	4–3	Lantz Arena; Charleston, Illinois
Dec 21, 1988*		Bethune–Cookman	W 63–53	5–3	Cincinnati Gardens; Cincinnati, Ohio
Dec 27, 1988*		Niagara	W 93–70	6–3	Cincinnati Gardens; Cincinnati, Ohio
Dec 30, 1988*		at Bowling Green	W 89–75	7–3	Anderson Arena; Bowling Green, Ohio
Jan 2, 1989*		Prairie View A&M	W 87–71	8–3	Cincinnati Gardens; Cincinnati, Ohio
Jan 4, 1989*		at Loyola Marymount	W 118–113	9–3	Gersten Pavilion; Los Angeles, California
Jan 7, 1989*		Valparaiso	W 97–88	10–3	Cincinnati Gardens; Cincinnati, Ohio
Jan 12, 1989		at Loyola (IL)	L 83–92	10–4 (0–1)	International Amphitheatre; Chicago, Illinois
Feb 20, 1989		Detroit	W 86–64	15–11 (5–7)	Cincinnati Gardens; Cincinnati, Ohio
Feb 25, 1989*		Marquette	W 102–77	16–11	Cincinnati Gardens; Cincinnati, Ohio
Mar 2, 1989		Butler	W 85–75	17–11 (6–7)	Cincinnati Gardens; Cincinnati, Ohio
Mar 4, 1989		Dayton	W 83–78	18–11 (7–7)	Cincinnati Gardens; Cincinnati, Ohio
Midwestern Collegiate Conference tournament
Mar 9, 1989*		vs. Loyola (IL); MCC Tournament Quarterfinal	W 85–83	19–11	UD Arena; Dayton, Ohio
Mar 10, 1989*		vs. Saint Louis; MCC Tournament Semifinal	W 79–56	20–11	UD Arena; Dayton, Ohio
Mar 11, 1989*		vs. Evansville; MCC tournament championship	W 85–78	21–11	UD Arena; Dayton, Ohio
NCAA Tournament
Mar 17, 1989*	(14 SE)	vs. (3 SE) No. 10 Michigan; First Round	L 87–92	21–12	Omni Coliseum; Atlanta Georgia
*Non-conference game. ^{#}Rankings from AP Poll. (#) Tournament seedings in parentheses. SE=Southeast. All times are in Eastern Time.
