= 2008–09 Butler Bulldogs men's basketball team =

American college basketball season

2008–09 Butler Bulldogs men's basketball
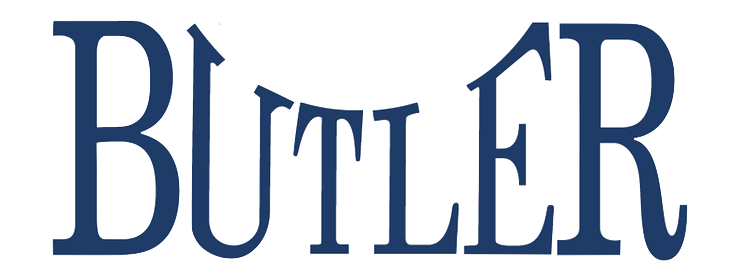

Horizon League Regular Season Champions Horizon League tournament Runners Up NCAA tournament, first round
- Conference: Horizon League

Ranking
- Coaches: No. 25
- AP: No. 22
- Record: 26–6 (15–3 Horizon)
- Head coach: Brad Stevens
- Assistant coaches: Matthew Graves; Terry Johnson; Micah Shrewsberry
- Home arena: Hinkle Fieldhouse

2008–09 Horizon League men's basketball standings
	Conf.				Overall
Team	W		L	PCT	W		L	PCT
No. 22 Butler	15	–	3	.833	26	–	6	.813
Green Bay	13	–	5	.722	22	–	11	.667
Cleveland State †	12	–	6	.667	26	–	11	.703
Wright State	12	–	6	.667	20	–	13	.606
Milwaukee	11	–	7	.611	17	–	14	.548
UIC	7	–	11	.389	16	–	15	.516
Youngstown State	7	–	11	.389	11	–	19	.367
Loyola Chicago	6	–	12	.333	14	–	18	.438
Valparaiso	5	–	13	.278	9	–	22	.290
Detroit	2	–	16	.111	7	–	23	.233
† Horizon League Tournament winner As of April 1, 2009; Rankings from AP Poll

The 2008–09 Butler Bulldogs men's basketball team represented Butler University in the 2008–09 NCAA Division I men's basketball season. Their head coach was Brad Stevens, serving his 2nd year. The Bulldogs played their home games at the Hinkle Fieldhouse, which has a capacity of approximately 10,000.

The Bulldogs won the 2009 Horizon League Men's Basketball Regular Season Championship and received an at-large bid to the 2009 NCAA Division I men's basketball tournament, earning a 9 seed in the South Region. They fell to 8 seed LSU .

== Roster ==
2009–10 Butler Bulldogs men's basketball team
Players
Coaches

Pos.	#	Name	Height	Weight	Year	Previous school	Hometown
G/F	11	Alex Anglin (W)	6 ft 4 in (1.93 m)	171 lb (78 kg)	So	Kokomo	Kokomo, Indiana
F	32	Garrett Butcher	6 ft 7 in (2.01 m)	206 lb (93 kg)	Fr	Edgewood	Ellettsville, Indiana
G	3	Zach Hahn	6 ft 1 in (1.85 m)	170 lb (77 kg)	So	New Castle Chrysler	New Castle, Indiana
G/F	20	Gordon Hayward	6 ft 8 in (2.03 m)	200 lb (91 kg)	Fr	Brownsburg	Brownsburg, Indiana
F	54	Matt Howard	6 ft 8 in (2.03 m)	230 lb (104 kg)	So	Connersville	Connersville, Indiana
F	24	Avery Jukes	6 ft 8 in (2.03 m)	217 lb (98 kg)	Jr	South Gwinnett/Alabama	Snellville, Georgia
C	30	Emerson Kampen (W)	6 ft 9 in (2.06 m)	192 lb (87 kg)	RS Fr	Yorktown	Yorktown, Indiana
G	22	Grant Leiendecker	6 ft 3 in (1.91 m)	178 lb (81 kg)	So	Homestead	Fort Wayne, Indiana
G	1	Shelvin Mack	6 ft 3 in (1.91 m)	214 lb (97 kg)	Fr	Bryan Station	Lexington, Kentucky
G	5	Ronald Nored	6 ft 0 in (1.83 m)	178 lb (81 kg)	Fr	Homewood	Homewood, Alabama
G	14	Nick Rodgers (W)	6 ft 1 in (1.85 m)	162 lb (73 kg)	Jr	Noblesville	Noblesville, Indiana
G	33	Chase Stigall	6 ft 3 in (1.91 m)	187 lb (85 kg)	RS Fr	New Castle Chrysler	New Castle, Indiana
G	2	Shawn Vanzant	6 ft 1 in (1.85 m)	171 lb (78 kg)	So	Wharton	Tampa, Florida
G/F	21	Willie Veasley	6 ft 3 in (1.91 m)	204 lb (93 kg)	Jr	Freeport	Freeport, Illinois

Head coach

- Brad Stevens (DePauw)

Assistant coach(es)

- Matthew Graves (Butler)
- Terry Johnson (Purdue Fort Wayne)
- Micah Shrewsberry (Hanover)

Legend

- (C) Team captain
- (S) Suspended
- (I) Ineligible
- (W) Walk-on
- Injured
- Current redshirt

Roster
Last update: 05 May 2010

== Schedule ==
Date time, TV	Rank^{#}	Opponent^{#}	Result	Record	Site city, state
Exhibition
October 30*; 7:00 pm		Marian	W 61–31		Hinkle Fieldhouse; Indianapolis, IN
November 8*; 7:00 pm		Oakland City	W 91–52		Hinkle Fieldhouse; Indianapolis, IN
Non-conference regular season
November 15*; 8:05 pm		at Drake	W 58–48	1–0	Knapp Center (6,012); Des Moines, IA
November 19*; 7:00 pm		Ball State	W 64–55	2–0	Hinkle Fieldhouse (5,056); Indianapolis, IN
November 22*; 2:00 pm		Indiana University South Bend	W 87–33	3–0	Hinkle Fieldhouse (3,444); Indianapolis, IN
November 26*; 7:00 pm		at Northwestern	W 57–53	4–0	Hinkle Fieldhouse (4,727); Indianapolis, IN
November 29*; 2:00 pm		Evansville	W 75–59	5–0	Hinkle Fieldhouse (4,708); Indianapolis, IN
December 4; 8:00 pm		at Cleveland State	W 50–48	6–0 (1–0)	Wolstein Center (2,604); Cleveland, OH
December 6; 7:05 pm		at Youngstown State	W 79–71	7–0 (2–0)	Beeghly Center (2,657); Youngstown, OH
December 10*; 8:05 pm		at Bradley	W 87–75	8–0	Carver Arena (9,366); Peoria, IL
December 13*; 12:00 pm		at No. 21 Ohio State	L 51–54	8–1	Jerome Schottenstein Center (13,976); Columbus, OH
December 20*; 2:00 pm		Florida Gulf Coast	W 73–53	9–1	Hinkle Fieldhouse (4,358); Indianapolis, IN
December 23*; 7:00 pm		at No. 12 Xavier	W 74–65	10–1	Cintas Center (10,250); Cincinnati, OH
December 30*; 7:00 pm		UAB	W 72–68	11–1	Hinkle Fieldhouse (8,141); Indianapolis, IN
Horizon League Play
January 3; 8:05 pm		at Valparaiso	W 75–62	12–1 (3–0)	Athletics–Recreation Center (4,737); Valparaiso, IN
January 8; 7:00 pm	No. 20	Wright State	W 64–48	13–1 (4–0)	Hinkle Fieldhouse (4,773); Indianapolis, IN
January 10; 2:00 pm	No. 20	Detroit	W 54–50	14–1 (5–0)	Hinkle Fieldhouse (5,652); Indianapolis, IN
January 15; 8:00 pm	No. 18	at Loyola–Chicago	W 78–55	15–1 (6–0)	Joseph J. Gentile Center (3,229); Chicago, IL
January 17; 2:00	No. 18	at Illinois-Chicago	W 59–52	16–1 (7–0)	UIC Pavilion (5,844); Chicago, IL
January 22; 7:00 pm	No. 17	Green Bay	W 68–59	17–1 (8–0)	Hinkle Fieldhouse (5,355); Indianapolis, IN
January 24; 2:00 pm	No. 17	Milwaukee	W 78–48	18–1 (9–0)	Hinkle Fieldhouse (9,418); Indianapolis, IN
January 30; 7:00 pm	No. 13	Valparaiso	W 59–51	19–1 (10–0)	Hinkle Fieldhouse (6,623); Indianapolis, IN
February 2; 8:00 pm	No. 11	at Green Bay	L 66–75	19–2 (10–1)	Resch Center (6,978); Green Bay, WI
February 5; 8:05 pm	No. 11	at Detroit	W 66–61	20–2 (11–1)	Calihan Hall (2,289); Detroit, MI
February 7; 7:00 pm	No. 11	at Wright State	W 69–51	21–2 (12–1)	Nutter Center (9,735); Dayton, OH
February 13; 7:00 pm	No. 15	Illinois-Chicago	W 80–61	22–2 (13–1)	Hinkle Fieldhouse (6,137); Indianapolis, IN
February 15; 2:00 pm	No. 15	Loyola–Chicago	L 67–71	22–3 (13–2)	Hinkle Fieldhouse (6,680); Indianapolis, IN
February 18; 8:00 pm	No. 22	at Milwaukee	L 60–63	22–4 (13–3)	U.S. Cellular Arena (5,026); Milwaukee, WI
February 21*; 12:00 pm	No. 22	at Davidson	W 75–63	23–4	John M. Belk Arena (5,223); Davidson, NC
February 26; 7:00 pm	No. 23	Youngstown State	W 78–57	24–4 (14–3)	Hinkle Fieldhouse (5,048); Indianapolis, IN
February 28; 12:00 pm	No. 23	Cleveland State	W 58–56	25–4 (15–3)	Hinkle Fieldhouse (8,549); Indianapolis, IN
Horizon League tournament
March 7; 7:00 pm	(1) No. 22	(4) Wright State; Horizon League Semifinal	W 62–57	26–4	Hinkle Fieldhouse (6,477); Indianapolis, IN
March 10; 9:00 pm	(1) No. 17	(3) Cleveland State; Horizon League Championship	L 54–57	26–5	Hinkle Fieldhouse (5,107); Indianapolis, IN
NCAA tournament
March 19*; 12:00 pm, CBS	(9 S) No. 23	at vs. (8 S) No. 20 LSU; Round of 64	L 71–75	26–6 (15–3)	Greensboro Coliseum; Greensboro, NC
*Non-conference game. ^{#}Rankings from Coaches' Poll. (#) Tournament seedings in parentheses. S=South Region. All times are in Eastern Time..

== Rankings ==
Ranking movement Legend: ██ Improvement in ranking. ██ Decrease in ranking.
Poll	Pre	Wk 1	Wk 2	Wk 3	Wk 4	Wk 5	Wk 6	Wk 7	Wk 8	Wk 9	Wk 10	Wk 11	Wk 12	Wk 13	Wk 14	Wk 15	Wk 16	WK 17	Wk 18	Final
AP	RV			RV	RV	RV	RV	25	21	17	16	13	11	15	21	24	22	16	22	
Coaches				RV	RV	RV	RV	RV	20	18	17	13	11	15	22	23	22	17	23	25

== See also ==
- 2009 NCAA Division I men's basketball tournament
