= 2008–09 Cleveland State Vikings men's basketball team =

American college basketball season

2008–09 Cleveland State Vikings men's basketball

Horizon League Tournament Champion

NCAA Tournament, second round
- Conference: Horizon League
- Record: 26–11 (12–6 Horizon)
- Head coach: Gary Waters
- Assistant coaches: Jayson Gee; Larry DeSimpelare; Jermaine Kimbrough
- Home arena: Wolstein Center

2008–09 Horizon League men's basketball standings
	Conf.				Overall
Team	W		L	PCT	W		L	PCT
No. 22 Butler	15	–	3	.833	26	–	6	.813
Green Bay	13	–	5	.722	22	–	11	.667
Cleveland State †	12	–	6	.667	26	–	11	.703
Wright State	12	–	6	.667	20	–	13	.606
Milwaukee	11	–	7	.611	17	–	14	.548
UIC	7	–	11	.389	16	–	15	.516
Youngstown State	7	–	11	.389	11	–	19	.367
Loyola Chicago	6	–	12	.333	14	–	18	.438
Valparaiso	5	–	13	.278	9	–	22	.290
Detroit	2	–	16	.111	7	–	23	.233
† Horizon League Tournament winner As of April 1, 2009; Rankings from AP Poll

The 2008–09 Cleveland State Vikings men's basketball team represented Cleveland State University in the 2008-09 NCAA Division I men's basketball season. The team was led by third-year head coach Gary Waters. In 2007–08, the Vikings finished 21–13 (12–6 in the Horizon League). Cleveland State had their first winning season since the 2000–2001 season when they finished 19–13 overall and 9–5 in conference play. They made their first NCAA tournament appearance since their run to the Sweet Sixteen in 1986. It was the 78th season of Cleveland State basketball.

== Preseason ==
Cleveland State started the preseason by playing games in Barcelona, Spain. It was also announced that Cleveland State would once again be participating in the ESPNU Bracketbuster games. Cleveland State also made several changes to the schedule. Cleveland State added Syracuse to the schedule, along with moving the former season-opening game against John Carroll to November 10, 2008, from November 14, 2008, and making it the only exhibition game of the year. Next they moved the Oakland game originally scheduled for December 16, 2008, to November 15, 2008, where it will be the season opener. They also moved the site of the three-game CBE Classic from Ft. Myers, Florida (Florida Gulf Coast), to Miami, Florida (Florida International). That meant that Cleveland State will now play Florida International, Toledo, and Tennessee Tech from November 24, 2008, to November 26, 2008. Lastly Cleveland State added La Roche College and Notre Dame College to the schedule, which completed the home scheduling for the year. Cleveland State will play nine teams that made the postseason in total this year. Cleveland State also has no less than 15 home games this year, with 14 of them being regular-season contests. The preseason Horizon League Coaches' Poll picked the Vikings to finish first. J'Nathan Bullock and Cedric Jackson were named to the preseason all-Horizon League first team. On October 27, 2008, Cleveland State announced that head coach Gary Waters was given a contract extension through the 2012–13 season. Also on October 27, 2008, Cleveland State received its first votes of the year, with two points in the AP Top 25 poll, with a ranking of T-50.

== Regular season ==
Cleveland State participated in the O'Reilly Auto Parts CBE Classic November 24–26. They won the tournament defeating Saint Leo, Toledo, and Florida International. On December 15, Cleveland State defeated #11 Syracuse at the Carrier Dome, marking the third time that the Vikings defeated a ranked opponent, and the first time it happened on the road. On February 18, 2009, Cleveland State posted its first back-to-back 20 win seasons since 1988. From 1984 to 1988 Cleveland State won 20 games or more each season. The February 28, 2009 contest against Butler start time was changed from a 2:00 p.m. start to a 12:00 p.m. start to accommodate an ESPN2 broadcast.

== Postseason ==
After clinching a #3 seed in the Horizon League tournament, the Vikings went on to defeat Detroit Mercy, Illinois Chicago, Wisconsin Green Bay, and Butler on the way to their first Horizon League tournament championship, and second tournament championship in school history. On March 15, 2009, it was announced Cleveland State would face Wake Forest in the NCAA Tournament. The Vikings received a #13 seed. On March 20, 2009, Cleveland State defeated Wake Forest 84–69 and advanced to the second round of the NCAA Tournament. Cleveland State was eliminated in the second round by losing to Arizona 71–57.

== Roster ==
Note: Flags indicate national team eligibility at FIBA sanctioned events. Players may hold other non-FIBA nationality not displayed.

No.		Position	Player
2	(United States)	G	David Constantine
4	(United States)	G	Trevon Harmon
5	(United States)	G	Jeremy Montgomery
11	(United States)	G	Cedric Jackson
20	(United States)	F	Charlie Woods
21	(United States)	F	George Tandy
22	(United States)	G	Josh McCoy
23	(United States)	F	Daitwan Eppinger
30	(United States)	G	Norris Cole

No.		Position	Player
32	(United States)	G	D'Aundray Brown
33	(United States)	F	Tim Kamczyc
35	(United States)	F	J'Nathan Bullock
42	(United States)	C	Chris Moore
44	(United States)	F	Aaron Pogue
45	(United States)	F	Renard Fields
50	(United States)	F	Ethan Anderson
51	(United States)	C	Joe Latas

== Schedule ==
Horizon League Standing: T-3rd
**Date**	**Opponent***	**Rank***	**Location**	**Time**^{#}	Result	**Overall**	**Conference**
**Exhibition Game**
November 10, 2008	John Carroll		Cleveland, OH	7:00 p.m.	W 81–33	1–0	
**Regular Season Games**
November 15, 2008	Oakland		Cleveland, OH	7:00 p.m.	W 58–55	1–0	
November 18, 2008	Washington		Seattle, WA	10:00 p.m.	L 78–63	1–1	
November 22, 2008	Kansas State		Cleveland, OH	7:00 p.m.	L 69–59	1–2	
November 24, 2008	Saint Leo		Miami, FL	5:00 p.m.	W 72–62	2–2	
November 25, 2008	Toledo		Miami, FL	4:00 p.m.	W 77–54	3–2	
November 26, 2008	Florida International		Miami, FL	7:30 p.m.	W 66–58	4–2	
December 2, 2008	**Valparaiso**		Cleveland, OH	7:00 p.m.	W 66–42	5–2	1–0
December 4, 2008	**Butler**		Cleveland, OH	7:00 p.m.	L 50–48	5–3	1–1
December 6, 2008	West Virginia		Morgantown, WV	1:00 p.m.	L 53–43	5–4	1–1
December 13, 2008	Marist		Poughkeepsie, NY	7:30 p.m.	W 66–47	6–4	1–1
December 15, 2008	#11 Syracuse		Syracuse, NY	7:00 p.m.	W 72–69	7–4	1–1
December 20, 2008	La Roche		Cleveland, OH	1:00 p.m.	W 72–46	8–4	1–1
December 23, 2008	Kent State		Cleveland, OH	7:00 p.m.	W 67–41	9–4	1–1
December 27, 2008	Notre Dame College		Cleveland, OH	1:00 p.m.	W 91–40	10–4	1–1
December 30, 2008	**Wright State**		Fairborn, OH	7:05 p.m.	L 71–62	10–5	1–2
January 3, 2009	**Detroit Mercy**		Detroit, MI	4:00 p.m.	W 53–44	11–5	2–2
January 8, 2009	**Loyola Chicago**		Cleveland, OH	7:30 p.m.	W 76–50	12–5	3–2
January 10, 2009	**Illinois Chicago**		Cleveland, OH	7:30 p.m.	W 79–69	13–5	4–2
January 16, 2009	**Wisconsin–Green Bay**		Green Bay, WI	8:00 p.m.	L 80–65	13–6	4–3
January 17, 2009	**Wisconsin Milwaukee**		Milwaukee, WI	8:00 p.m.	L 77–75	13–7	4–4
January 24, 2009	**Youngstown State**		Youngstown, OH	9:00 p.m.	L 64–60	13–8	4–5
January 29, 2009	**Detroit Mercy**		Cleveland, OH	7:30 p.m.	W 66–49	14–8	5–5
January 31, 2009	**Wright State**		Cleveland, OH	7:30 p.m.	W 59–50	15–8	6–5
February 5, 2009	**Illinois Chicago**		Chicago, Illinois	8:00 p.m.	W 66–63	16–8	7–5
February 7, 2009	**Loyola Chicago**		Chicago, Illinois	4:00 p.m.	W 83–70	17–8	8–5
February 12, 2009	**Wisconsin Milwaukee**		Cleveland, OH	7:00 p.m.	W 70–61	18–8	9–5
February 14, 2009	**Wisconsin–Green Bay**		Cleveland, OH	7:30 p.m.	W 83–75	19–8	10–5
February 18, 2009	**Youngstown State**		Cleveland, OH	7:00 p.m.	W 58–54	20–8	11–5
February 21, 2009	Wichita State		Wichita, KS	3:05 p.m.	L 70–59	20–9	11–5
February 26, 2009	**Valparaiso**		Valparaiso, IN	8:30 p.m.	W 71–64	21–9	12–5
February 28, 2009	#24 **Butler**		Indianapolis, IN	12:00 p.m.	L 56–58	21–10	12–6
**Horizon League tournament**
March 3, 2009	Detroit Mercy		Cleveland, OH	7:00 p.m.	W 56–43	22–10	12–6
March 6, 2009	Illinois Chicago		Indianapolis, IN	8:00 p.m.	W 67–64	23–10	12–6
March 7, 2009	Wisconsin–Green Bay		Indianapolis, IN	9:00 p.m.	W 73–67	24–10	12–6
March 10, 2009	#17 Butler		Indianapolis, IN	9:00 p.m.	W 57–54	25–10	12–6
**NCAA tournament**
March 20, 2009	#12 Wake Forest		Miami, FL	9:40 p.m.	W 84–69	26–10	12–6
March 22, 2009	Arizona		Miami, FL	2:50 p.m.	L 57–71	26–11	12–6
*Rank according to AP Top 25 Poll. ^{#}All times are in Eastern. Conference games in **bold**.
