= 2009 Horizon League men's basketball tournament =

- 2009 Tournament Logo
- Classification: Division I
- Season: 2008–09
- Teams: 10
- First round site: campus sites
- Quarterfinals site: Hinkle Fieldhouse; Indianapolis, Indiana
- Semifinals site: Hinkle Fieldhouse; Indianapolis, Indiana
- Finals site: Hinkle Fieldhouse; Indianapolis, Indiana
- Champions: Cleveland State (1st title)
- Winning coach: Gary Waters (1st title)
- MVP: Cedric Jackson (Cleveland State)
- Television: ESPNU, ESPN

2008–09 Horizon League men's basketball standings
	Conf.				Overall
Team	W		L	PCT	W		L	PCT
No. 22 Butler	15	–	3	.833	26	–	6	.813
Green Bay	13	–	5	.722	22	–	11	.667
Cleveland State †	12	–	6	.667	26	–	11	.703
Wright State	12	–	6	.667	20	–	13	.606
Milwaukee	11	–	7	.611	17	–	14	.548
UIC	7	–	11	.389	16	–	15	.516
Youngstown State	7	–	11	.389	11	–	19	.367
Loyola Chicago	6	–	12	.333	14	–	18	.438
Valparaiso	5	–	13	.278	9	–	22	.290
Detroit	2	–	16	.111	7	–	23	.233
† Horizon League Tournament winner As of April 1, 2009; Rankings from AP Poll

The 2009 Horizon League men's basketball tournament was held at the end of the 2008–2009 regular season. The better seed hosted each first round match. The second and third rounds were played at Hinkle Fieldhouse in Indianapolis. The championship game was played at the home court of the highest remaining seed, also Hinkle Fieldhouse, the home court of the Butler men's basketball team.

== Regular season standings ==
Pos.	School	Record
1	Butler	15–3
2	UW-Green Bay	13–5
3	Cleveland State	12–6
3	Wright State	12–6
5	UW-Milwaukee	11–7
6	Youngstown State	7–11
6	Illinois-Chicago	7–11
8	Loyola Chicago	6–12
9	Valparaiso	5–13
10	Detroit	2–16

- Cleveland State was seeded ahead of Wright State based on a better Ratings Percentage Index (RPI) score, all other

tiebreakers having failed to distinguish the two teams.

- Youngstown State finished ahead of Illinois-Chicago based on head-to-head record.

== Bracket ==
First round Tuesday, March 3
4	Wright State	68
9	Valparaiso	56
5	Milwaukee	77
8	Loyola Chicago	68
3	Cleveland State	56
10	Detroit	43
6	Youngstown State	68
7	UIC	73

Second round Friday, March 6
4	Wright State	80
5	Milwaukee	70
3	Cleveland State	67
7	UIC	64

Semifinals; Saturday, March 7
1	#22 Butler	62
4	Wright State	57
2	Green Bay	67
3	Cleveland State	73

Final; Tuesday, March 10
1	#16 Butler	54
3	Cleveland State	57

First round games at campus sites of lower-numbered seeds
Second round and semifinals hosted by Butler. Championship hosted by lower-numbered remaining seed

== All-Tournament Team ==
- MVP: Cedric Jackson, Cleveland State
- J'Nathan Bullock, Cleveland State
- Norris Cole, Cleveland State
- Matt Howard, Butler
- Shelvin Mack, Butler
