= Brad Stevens =

American basketball executive, coach and player (born 1976)

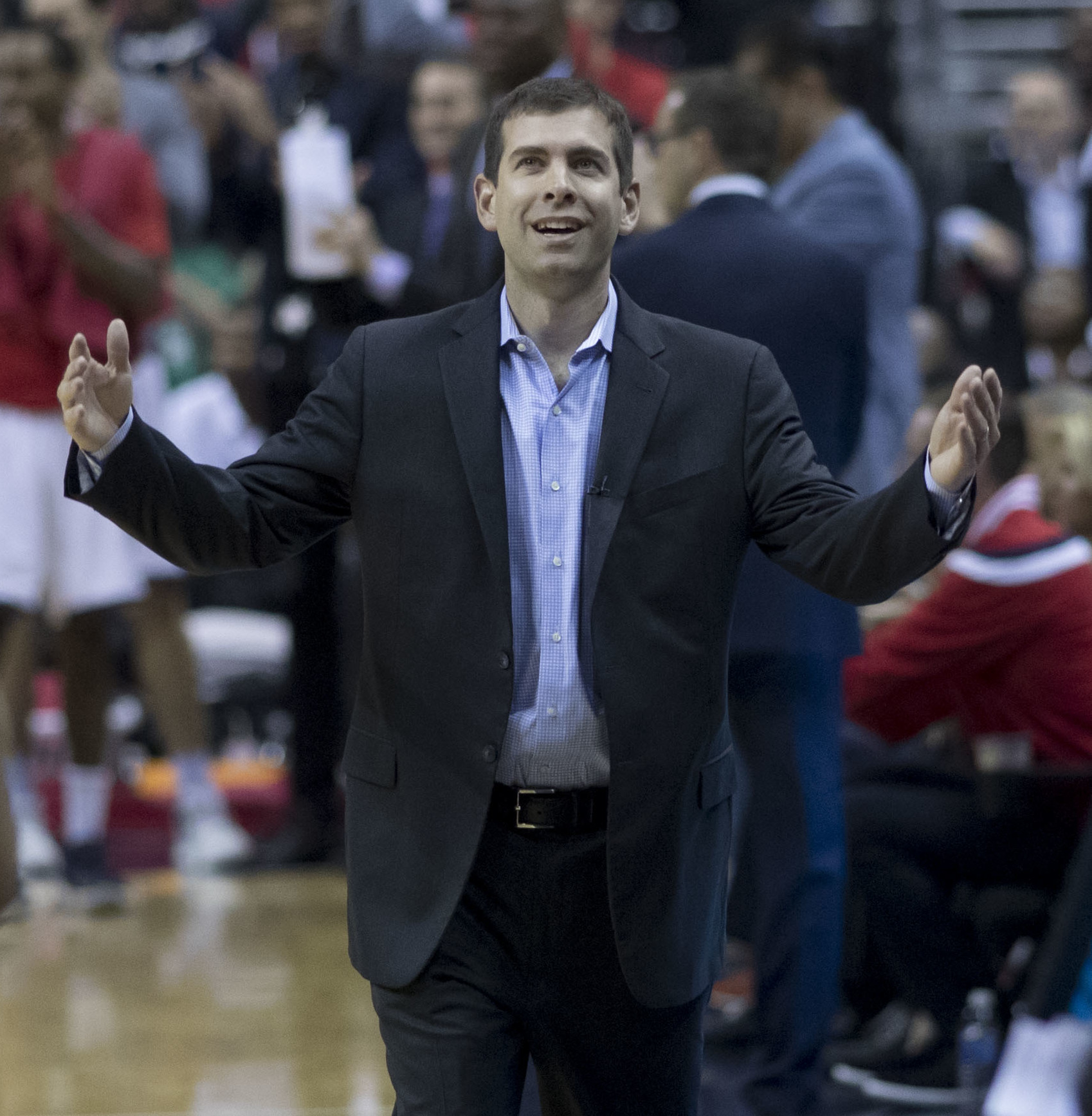
- Stevens with the Boston Celtics in 2017

Boston Celtics
- Title: President of basketball operations
- League: NBA

Personal information
- Born: October 22, 1976 (age 50) Zionsville, Indiana, U.S.
- Listed height: 6 ft 1 in (1.85 m)

Career information
- High school: Zionsville (Zionsville, Indiana)
- College: DePauw (1995–1999)
- Position: Guard
- Coaching career: 2001–2021

Career history

Coaching
- 2001–2005: Butler (assistant)
- 2007–2013: Butler
- 2013–2021: Boston Celtics

Career highlights
- As coach: NBA All-Star Game Head Coach (2017); Clair Bee Coach of the Year Award (2011); 2× NCAA Division I regional champion – Final Four (2010, 2011); 3× Horizon League tournament champion (2008, 2010, 2011); 4× Horizon League regular season champion (2008–2011); 2× Horizon League Coach of the Year (2009, 2010); As executive: NBA champion (2024); 2x NBA Executive of the Year (2024, 2026)

Bradley Kent Stevens (born October 22, 1976) is an American basketball executive and former coach who is the president of basketball operations for the Boston Celtics of the National Basketball Association (NBA).

Born and raised in Zionsville, Indiana, Stevens starred on the Zionsville Community High School basketball team, setting four school records. After high school, he attended DePauw University, where he played basketball and earned a degree in economics. Stevens made the all-conference team multiple times and was a three-time Academic All-America nominee. He transitioned into coaching after quitting his job at Eli Lilly and Company, joining the basketball program at Butler University as a volunteer prior to the 2000–01 season. Stevens was promoted to a full-time assistant coach the following season. After five seasons in the role, he assumed the position of head coach on April 4, 2007, after Todd Lickliter left to coach the Iowa Hawkeyes. In his first year, Stevens led Butler to 30 wins, becoming the third-youngest head coach in NCAA Division I history to have a 30-win season.

In 2010, his third year as head coach, Stevens broke the NCAA record for most wins in a coach's first three years, exceeding the previous record by eight wins. In the NCAA tournament, Stevens coached Butler to the first Final Four in school history, while also becoming the second-youngest head coach to make an NCAA national championship game, losing 61–59 to Duke. With the following season's team also making the Final Four, Stevens became the youngest coach to go to two Final Fours. Stevens coached the Bulldogs in their second consecutive national championship game on April 4, 2011, where the team again lost, this time to the Connecticut Huskies. Stevens was regularly named a finalist for Horizon League Coach of the Year award, winning twice, and was also a nominee for both the Hugh Durham Award and Jim Phelan Award in every year of his college career.

This success garnered Stevens the head coaching job with the Celtics in 2013, when he signed a six-year, $22 million contract. After undertaking a rebuild early in his tenure, Stevens led the Celtics to the NBA playoffs every season from 2014-15 to 2020-21, won a division championship in 2016–17, and appeared in the Eastern Conference finals in 2017, 2018, and 2020. He gained a reputation as one of the NBA's best coaches, with his motion offense and stingy defense earning plaudits from fans, peers, and players.

In June 2021, Stevens was named president of basketball operations of the Celtics, giving him the powers of general manager, following the resignation of Danny Ainge. In April 2024, Stevens was named the 2023–24 NBA Executive of the Year. Less than two months later, he won his first NBA championship with the Celtics as an executive, completing the rebuild that Stevens helped begin and oversee as the head coach. In April 2026, Stevens was named the 2025-26 NBA Executive of the Year, becoming the twelfth executive to win the award multiple times.

== Early life ==
Stevens grew up in Zionsville, Indiana, where he developed his love for basketball. Starting at age five, Stevens would watch taped basketball games "before he went to afternoon kindergarten". His father often drove him to Bloomington to watch Indiana Hoosiers games. Stevens later stated, "It's hard not to be [in love with basketball] when you're a kid growing up in Indiana."

For his eighth birthday, Stevens received a new basketball hoop. He later remarked: "It's so much fun to dream in your driveway. That's where my friends and I hung out. It was a lot of fun to grow up in that era." When a friend, Brandon Monk, had a basketball court installed in his backyard, Stevens "appeared instantaneously." He was so dedicated to the game that he would bring the unprepared ingredients for grilled cheese sandwiches to Monk's house so that he would not waste time waiting for the sandwiches to cook.

Monk's court soon became a gathering place, where kids from Zionsville and the surrounding areas would hold pickup games. These games helped develop Stevens' competitive streak. Besides playing basketball, the young Stevens also enjoyed solving puzzles, a skill he later applied to analyzing opposing teams to find their weaknesses.

Stevens attended Zionsville Community High School, where he became a star basketball player. Stevens wore No. 31 in high school in honor of Indiana Pacers guard Reggie Miller. As a freshman, Stevens got up early to practice shooting at a local gym before school. The hard work paid off as he made the varsity team that year. By the end of his high school career, Stevens had set school records for career scoring, assists, steals, and three-point field goals. As of 2017, he still holds the records for career points per game average (26.8), total career points (1,508), assists (444), and steals (156), as well as the single-season points record (644 in 1995). Stevens was named to the all-conference team thrice. In 1995, he was the sectional MVP and the leading scorer in state sectional play (32.3 ppg).

Stevens made the academic all-state first team and received the Straight A Gold Medal Award all four years. He was a member of the National Honor Society, graduating seventh in his class of 165. Stevens also earned three letters in basketball, three in track, and one in baseball during his days at Zionsville. During summers, he traveled the country playing AAU basketball.

Stevens was recruited to play Division III basketball at NCAC powerhouse DePauw University, where he played in all 101 DePauw games, earning four varsity letters. Stevens earned multiple all-conference and academic all-conference awards, and was a three-time Academic All-America nominee. He was a team captain during his senior year and averaged more than eight points per game three of his four years. Stevens' career highs were 24 points and eight rebounds in a game. After his senior year, Stevens received the Coaches' Award. Coach Bill Fenlon later described Stevens as "one of the most selfless, team-oriented person [sic] I've ever been around."

At DePauw, Stevens was a member of the Management Fellows Honors Program and the DePauw Community Services' Sports Night executive board. He was also a brother of the Alpha Tau Omega fraternity. During summer vacations, Stevens spent time teaching at Butler basketball camps. He was named to the Dean's list and graduated in 1999 with a degree in economics.

== College coaching career ==
In the summer of 2000, Stevens was offered the opportunity to volunteer in the Butler basketball office. He ran the idea of quitting his job at Eli Lilly by then-longtime girlfriend (and now wife) Tracy Wilhelmy. She thought about it for two hours before telling him to go for it. Stevens later remarked, "Now, it looks like a great idea. At the time, I thought it was something I really wanted to try." Tracy began law school to get a J.D. degree that could support the couple if things did not work out for Stevens. She later said, "We were 23 and realized this was our chance. Five years down the road, we were probably not going to be in a position to do that. The more success you had at Lilly, the harder it would be to leave."

Stevens planned to live in a friend's basement and took a job at Applebee's to pay the bills. Before Stevens started training at Applebee's, he was offered a low-paying administrative position as coordinator of basketball operations under then-coach Thad Matta. The position had opened up when assistant coach Jamal Meeks resigned after being arrested on solicitation and drug charges, of which he was later acquitted. Years later, Matta recalled, "[Stevens] was just a hungry young kid that was desperate to get into coaching. He had a great passion and was willing to take a risk to get into the coaching profession."

After Matta left the school following the 2000–01 season, new head coach Todd Lickliter promoted Stevens to a full-time assistant coach. Under Lickliter, Stevens was active in every aspect of the game: skills instruction, game preparation, in-game coaching, and recruiting. Butler was 131–61 during Stevens' time as an assistant coach.

=== Named head coach ===
On April 2, 2007, Lickliter resigned in order to take the head-coaching position at the University of Iowa. The Butler players had a meeting with athletic director Barry Collier, urging him to promote from within. Collier, having spent the entire season observing the assistant coaches' interaction with the team, agreed. The day after Lickliter resigned Stevens and Butler's two other assistant coaches interviewed for the job. Within 24 hours of the interviews the 30-year-old Stevens was named Butler's new head coach. According to Collier, Stevens had something older, outside candidates could never match: six years of experience learning the Butler system, dubbed "The Butler Way" by Collier. "Age wasn't a factor because I'd seen his ability shine through during the course of the season," Collier said.

=== 2007–08 season ===
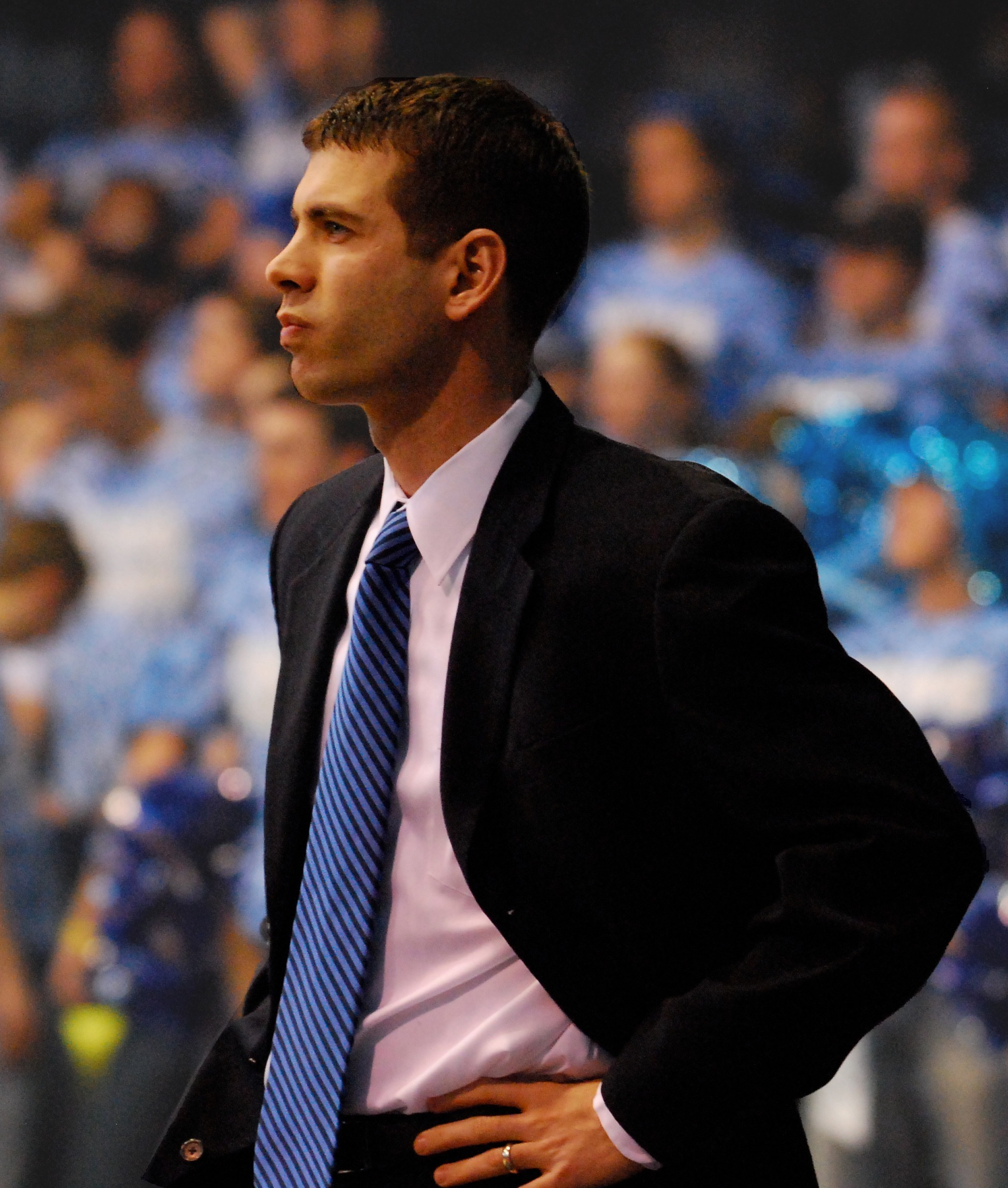
Stevens watches from the sidelines during a 2008 game against Drake

At the start of the 2007–08 season, Stevens was the second-youngest coach in Division I basketball. He got off to a fast start, winning his first eight games before narrowly falling to Wright State 43–42. Legendary coach Bob Knight, whose Texas Tech team was an early victim, said: "I wish we played as smart as they do." Virginia Tech coach Seth Greenberg added: "they've got toughness about them and they expect to win."

Midway through Stevens' first season, with the Bulldogs at 12–1, The New York Times wrote "so far, Stevens has made the transition [to head coach] look easy." The Times went on to state that Stevens had the calm and composure of a seasoned veteran. "You've got a lot of people always looking for the next step. And that's not what I was doing. I was just trying to figure out a way to win the next game and think like a head coach," Stevens said.

Butler ended the regular season with a 27–3 record, taking first place in the Horizon League with a 16–2 in conference mark. The team beat Illinois–Chicago 66–50 and Cleveland State 70–55 to claim the league's tournament title and an automatic bid to the 2008 NCAA tournament. Butler was awarded the seven seed in the East Regional. They beat tenth-seeded South Alabama 81–61 in the first round, before falling to second-seeded Tennessee 76–71 in overtime.

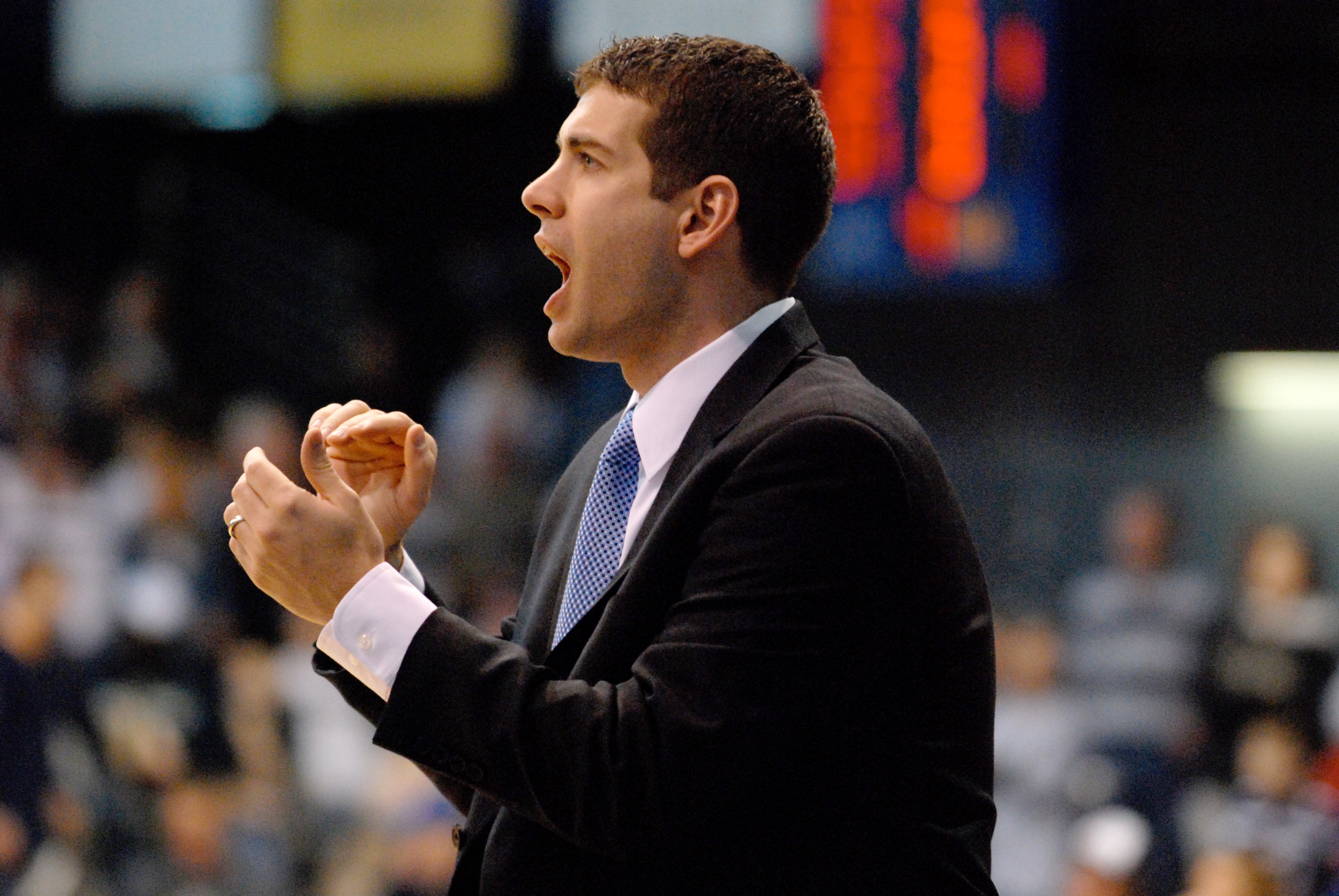
Stevens offering encouragement from the sidelines during a 2008 game against Detroit

Stevens ended up with a school and Horizon league record 30 wins, beating several big-name schools—Michigan, Texas Tech, Florida State, Ohio State—along the way. In doing so, he became the third-youngest head coach in NCAA Division I history to lead a team to 30 wins in a season and became the fourth-winningest first-year coach. Butler was nationally ranked for a school and league record 19 consecutive weeks. Butler's 30–4 record was the best among teams that did not reach the Final Four. Stevens was a finalist for the Hugh Durham Award, losing to Keno Davis of Drake, and a finalist for the Jim Phelan National Coach of the Year Award, losing to Bo Ryan.

At the end of the season, Butler signed Stevens to a seven-year contract. "We are extremely excited to reach this long-term agreement to have Brad continue to lead our program," Collier remarked.

=== 2008–09 season ===
Butler lost four starters after the 2007–08 season, and was picked to finish fifth in the Horizon league during the 2008–09 season. The team got off to a 12–1 start that won Stevens the Hugh Durham mid-season coaching award. On February 5, Stevens notched his 50th win as Butler beat Detroit 66–61. In so doing, Stevens became the sixth head coach in NCAA history to reach 50 wins in 56 games or fewer. Butler finished first in the Horizon League with a 15–3 in conference record, defying preseason expectations. Butler lost the Horizon League tournament final 57–54 to Cleveland State, but made the NCAA tournament as an at-large selection. The team received the nine seed in the South Regional, and lost to eighth-seeded Louisiana State in the first round by a score of 75–71 to finish the year at 26–6 overall.

Stevens' 56–10 two-year record places him third only to Bill Guthridge (58) and Tommy Lloyd (61) in total wins during one's first two years as head coach. Stevens was a finalist for both the Hugh Durham and Jim Phelan Awards for the second straight year and was named the Horizon League Coach of the Year. He was also named as a finalist for the Henry Iba Coach of the Year Award. Stevens was given a one-year contract extension at the conclusion of the season.

=== 2009–10 season ===
Fueled in large part by Gordon Hayward's and Shelvin Mack's roles in leading Team USA to the gold medal in the FIBA Under-19 World Championship during the off-season, Butler began the season ranked 10th in the Coaches' Poll and 11th in the AP Poll. A few commentators picked the Bulldogs as a possible "sleeper team" to make the Final Four. Stevens was not so sure, privately telling his father, "We have a really good team, and I'm not sure how far we can go this year, but next year, we ought to go really far."

Butler got off to a mediocre start, losing twice in the 76 Classic 82–73 to 22nd-ranked Minnesota and to 19th-ranked Clemson 70–69. After the tournament Butler's record stood at 4–2 and the team dropped to #23 in the AP Poll and #20 in the Coaches' Poll. Butler won its next two games before falling to 13th-ranked Georgetown 72–65 in the Jimmy V Classic. The team won its next two games beating #15 Ohio State 74–66 and narrowly edging out former conference rival Xavier 69–68, both at home. After losing 67–57 at UAB three days later, Butler stood at 9–4 and fell out of the AP rankings. However, the team remained in the Coaches' Poll at #23.

Stevens rallied the team, and they proceeded to win 16 straight games before facing Siena in a BracketBusters game. Butler beat Siena 70–53 and Stevens tied the NCAA record for most wins (81) by a head coach in his first three seasons set by Mark Few of Gonzaga in 2002 and tied by Mark Fox of Nevada in 2007.

On February 26, 2010, Butler traveled to Valparaiso for their regular-season finale. Leading scorer Gordon Hayward was sidelined with lower back pain, but the team still won 74–69. In doing so, Stevens broke the coaching record he had tied the prior week and Butler completed an 18–0 undefeated conference schedule. It was Butler's first undefeated conference record since joining the Horizon League, and first since Joe Sexson led the 1978 team to a 6–0 record in the now-defunct Indiana Collegiate Conference. Stevens earned his third straight regular-season conference championship.

In the Horizon league tournament, Stevens' Bulldogs used their home-court advantage to beat Milwaukee 68–59 in the semifinals and to beat Wright State 70–45 in the finals. The win earned the team an automatic bid into the 2010 NCAA tournament, and completed a 20–0 run through league play. Stevens became the first coach to lead a Horizon League team to both an undefeated regular season and conference tournament since the league was formed in 1979. He was also the only coach in Division I to lead his team to an undefeated conference schedule during the 2009–10 season.

==== NCAA tournament ====
For their season, the Bulldogs were ranked eighth in the final pre-NCAA tournament Coaches' Poll and 11th in the corresponding AP Poll. On Selection Sunday, the Bulldogs were seeded fifth in the West regional of the NCAA tournament and given a first-round match-up with twelfth-seeded UTEP on March 18.

Many basketball commentators picked UTEP to pull the upset, and at halftime it looked like they might be right, as UTEP led 33–27. Stevens made a number of halftime adjustments, and the Bulldogs came out firing on all cylinders in the second half. The team dominated the second half and won the game 77–59. Butler next faced off with 13th-seeded Murray State. The game was close throughout, but Butler emerged victorious 54–52 when Hayward deflected a Murray State pass into the back court with less than five seconds on the clock. The win gave Stevens the first Sweet Sixteen appearance of his career.

On March 25, 2010, Butler faced top-seeded Syracuse. The Bulldogs got off to a good start, jumping out to a 12–1 lead and a 35–25 halftime advantage. Syracuse rallied in the second half, taking its first lead of the game, 40–39, off a Wes Johnson three-pointer. Stevens called timeout and Butler regained the lead on its next possession, stopping the run. At the 5:32 mark, Syracuse got a rare fast-break opportunity that ended with a dunk and 54–50 lead. Stevens again called time out and re-focused the team. Butler responded by holding Syracuse scoreless for the next five minutes, taking a 60–54 lead with 0:59 to go. Butler held on to win 63–59, advancing to the Elite Eight for the first time in school history.

Two days later, Stevens' Bulldogs met second-seeded Kansas State in the regional finals. Perhaps feeling the effects of their 101–96 double-overtime win two days prior, Kansas State got off to a slow start, scoring just 20 points in the first half to trail 27–20. Butler kept the lead in the upper single digits for most of the second half, before Kansas State went on a 13–2 run and took a 52–51 lead. Stevens immediately called time out and re-focused the team. "Play your game. Just play your game," he told them. On the ensuing possession, Butler regained the lead for good. They outscored Kansas State 12–4 the rest of the way and won the game 63–56. In the postgame celebration, Stevens and walk-on forward Emerson Kampen connected on a flying back-bump that became one of the iconic images of the tournament.

The win earned the Bulldogs a trip to Indianapolis for the first Final Four appearance in school and Horizon League history. The win made Stevens, at age 33, the youngest coach to lead a team to the Final Four since Bob Knight made his first Final Four appearance at age 32 in 1973. Butler became the smallest school (enrollment 4,200) to make the Final Four since seeding began in 1979.

===== Final Four =====
On April 3, Stevens and the Butler Bulldogs faced off with Michigan State in the national semi-finals. Michigan State took an early 14–7 lead, and Matt Howard got in early foul trouble, sitting most of the first half. Stevens kept the team focused with a "next man up" attitude and the game was tied at 28 at halftime. The second half was dominated by tight defense for both sides. With 2:45 to go in the game, the score was 47–44 Butler. Michigan State called a time out to set up a play. Stevens correctly anticipated the play call and had Ronald Nored, the team's best defender, switch onto Korie Lucious off a screen. Nored stole the ball and Shawn Vanzant got fouled on the resulting run out, hitting 1 of 2. Trailing 50–49 with under 30 seconds remaining, Michigan State came up empty and was forced to foul. Nored hit both foul shots, giving Butler a 52–49 lead. After a Michigan State time-out, Stevens had his team foul Lucious with two seconds remaining to prevent a potentially game tying three-pointer. After making the first, Lucious intentionally missed the second free throw. Hayward came down with the rebound to seal the victory. Butler became the first team since the shot clock was adopted for the 1985–86 season to hold five straight tournament opponents under 60 points.

On April 5, 2010, Butler and Duke faced off in what The New York Times called "the most eagerly awaited championship game in years." Late in the first half, Duke went on an 8–0 run to take a 26–20 lead. Stevens called a timeout, and with starters Matt Howard and Ronald Nored on the bench in foul trouble, Stevens was forced to call on backup center Avery Jukes who came up big for Butler. Jukes scored 10 first half points, tying his season high. At half time, Duke's lead stood at 33–32.

The second half was played closely, with neither team taking a substantial lead. With 3:16 to play, Duke took a 60–55 lead on two made free throws by Nolan Smith. Butler cut the lead to one point in the final minute and, after a missed Kyle Singler jump shot with 36 seconds remaining, got a chance to retake the lead. Butler was unable to initiate their offense, and Stevens called a timeout to set up a play. A failed inbounds attempt and a timeout later, Hayward missed a baseline fade-away jumper and Brian Zoubek came down with the rebound for Duke. He was quickly fouled with less than four seconds remaining. Hayward narrowly missed a desperation half-court shot as time expired, making the final margin 61–59.

The loss snapped Butler's 25-game winning streak, the longest in school history. Butler became the smallest school to play for a National Championship since Jacksonville in 1970. Stevens became the second-youngest head coach to coach in the NCAA National Championship Game, behind Branch McCracken who led the Indiana Hoosiers to the 1940 national championship at age 31. Stevens was named as both a Hugh Durham and Jim Phelan Award finalist for the third consecutive year, losing to Mike Young and Jamie Dixon, respectively. He was also a finalist for the Skip Prosser Man of the Year Award, which was won by Bob Marlin.

Butler finished the year ranked #2 in the Coaches' Poll, the highest ranking in school history. The school was ranked for 19 consecutive weeks, tying the school record.

=== 2010 off-season ===
After the end of the 2009–10 season, Stevens and Butler continued to attract considerable attention. Then-U.S. president Barack Obama personally called Stevens to congratulate him on Butler's season. David Letterman had Stevens on his show for a guest appearance. Butler admissions inquiries increased by 67%. Stevens received fan letters from around the world, and his phone rang off the hook. Stevens was even invited to throw the ceremonial first pitch before the Chicago Cubs versus Florida Marlins game in Chicago on May 10. "It's all been very surreal," Stevens said. "If you are the runner-up, you don't expect to talk to the president." He added: "It's been a little overwhelming, because I'm a pretty simple guy."

The 2009–10 season also helped increase Butler's recruiting profile. Asked if the increased fame would change things, Stevens said it better not spoil him or the university. Stevens stated: "I look at this new challenge of not changing and sticking to your core values and making sure you remain humble as a great coaching opportunity."

=== 2010–11 season ===
Rankings by ESPN's Andy Katz and Fox Sports' Jeff Goodman released shortly after the 2010 championship game both had Butler third for the 2010–11 season. Duke coach Mike Krzyzewski agreed, saying Butler would be "right up there, No. 1 or No. 2... They'll be a favorite next year." However, Hayward chose to leave early for the NBA draft and Butler went through a rough patch early in the season, at one point losing three straight games and having a 6–5 conference record. Bolstered by the emergence of Andrew Smith at center and Matt Howard's success as a perimeter forward, Butler ended up winning a share of the conference title at 13–5. The Bulldogs then won the Horizon League tournament to secure an automatic NCAA tournament bid and received the No. 8 seed.

Picked by some to lose a first-round match-up against Old Dominion, Butler advanced on a last-second tip-in by Howard. Howard was also clutch in their next game, hitting a free throw with a less than one second remaining to beat Pitt in a dramatic finish. Shelvin Mack scored 30 points in the victory. Butler won their next game when they defeated Wisconsin. On March 26, 2011, the Bulldogs beat Florida 74–71 in overtime to earn back-to-back trips to the Final Four. A week later, Butler beat fellow Cinderella team VCU 70–62 to make it to a second consecutive national championship game. For the second consecutive year, the Bulldogs fell in the national championship game, this time to Connecticut.

=== Coaching future ===
On April 8, 2010, Stevens signed a long-term deal with Butler, extending his contract through the 2021–22 season. Financial terms of the contract were not disclosed; however, Butler president Bobby Fong had publicly stated that the university could afford to increase Stevens' base salary to approximately US $1 million a few days prior. He had previously made US$395,000 plus benefits in base salary, a relatively low figure for a successful Division I head basketball coach. Stevens' total compensation for 2009–10 was estimated at US$750,000. He had received a raise after each of his three seasons at Butler and his contract contains a buyout clause estimated in the high-six or low-seven figures.

What Butler is, Butler is a great school. We're in a great city. We have a niche from the standpoint of basketball with a good tradition of basketball and a fieldhouse that really embraces the history of the game. So we're very unique. I think being unique is a good thing, too. I think Butler, certainly you always want to improve the facilities you have. We need to do that. There's no question about that. But we also need to remember who we are. I think that's why we're here, because we've got unselfish guys. They have a great passion for history, tradition, team, things like that. So we've been able to recruit to that.

— Brad Stevens, responding to a question about his future and Butler University

By re-signing with Butler, Stevens temporarily ended speculation that he would leave the university for a higher paying job. Oregon, Clemson, and Wake Forest were all said to be interested in offering Stevens multi-million-dollar contracts to leave Butler. "First and foremost, I'm loyal to Butler," Stevens said. When asked if he would ever leave Butler, Stevens replied, "I guess if they kicked me out."

After the 2011–12 season, Stevens was pursued vigorously by Illinois to fill their coaching vacancy before he declined their offer.

In March 2013, UCLA reportedly offered Stevens between $2.5 and $3 million a year to leave Butler. Rumors circulated that he was in contract negotiations with UCLA, but ultimately the rumors proved false and Stevens stayed at Butler. Commenting on the situation, a source close to Stevens said: "Brad doesn't understand why people would assume he's leaving." A few days later, Stevens reiterated that he was happy at Butler and had no intentions to leave as long as he had the support of the university to continue running the program the "right way."

== NBA coaching career ==
On July 3, 2013, Stevens was hired as the head coach of the Boston Celtics. In his second season as head coach, Stevens led the team to the 2015 playoffs as the #7-seed in the Eastern Conference with a 40–42 record. On April 21, 2015, it was announced that Stevens finished fourth in voting for the NBA's Coach of the Year Award. In his third season, Stevens led the Celtics to their second consecutive playoff appearance as the #5-seed in the 2016 playoffs, finishing the season with a 48–34 record.

Stevens was named the Eastern Conference Coach of the Month for April 2015. He led the Celtics to the East's best record in April at 7–1. The Celtics recorded a 4–0 mark on the road, and closed the month with six consecutive victories—five of them against playoff teams. On February 28, 2016, Stevens was named the Eastern Conference Coach of the Month for February. He guided his squad to an Eastern Conference-best 9–3 record during the month, including a perfect 6–0 mark at home. The Celtics (36–25 overall) finished the month in sole possession of third place in the East behind the Cleveland Cavaliers and Atlantic Division foe the Toronto Raptors.

On June 1, 2016, Stevens received a contract extension. On February 3, 2017, he was named the Eastern Conference head coach for the 2017 NBA All-Star Game. In his fourth season as head coach, Stevens led the Celtics to the playoffs as the top seed in the Eastern Conference with a 53–29 record. They reached the Eastern Conference Finals, where they lost to the defending champion Cleveland Cavaliers in five games.

On July 4, 2017, Stevens was reunited with his former college player Gordon Hayward when Hayward signed a contract to play for the Celtics. In the 2017–18 season, the Celtics' roster saw a massive change, as two-time All-Star Isaiah Thomas was traded to the Cleveland Cavaliers in exchange for Kyrie Irving. Stevens and the Celtics went 55–27, finishing the season as the second seed in the Eastern Conference, despite losing Hayward for the season to a broken ankle in the first game of the season and Irving missing significant playing time due to knee injuries. Despite Irving missing the playoffs, Stevens led the Celtics on a deep playoff run, losing to the Cleveland Cavaliers in seven games during the Eastern Conference Finals. Stevens was considered a front-runner for the NBA Coach of the Year Award, but lost to Dwane Casey of the Toronto Raptors.

== Executive career ==
=== 2021–22 season ===
On June 2, 2021, the Celtics named Stevens as the new president of basketball operations and de facto general manager, replacing Danny Ainge, who announced his retirement, though Ainge later joined the Utah Jazz as their alternate governor in December 2021. On June 18, Stevens made his first transaction in his new position by trading away Kemba Walker, the 16th pick in the 2021 NBA draft (later Alperen Şengün), and a 2025 second-round pick (later Kobe Sanders) in exchange for Al Horford, Moses Brown, and a 2023 second-round pick (later Amari Bailey). The deal gave the Celtics a bit more financial flexibility with Horford due about $20 million less than Walker over the next two years. The Celtics also improved their depth in the frontcourt by adding Horford and Brown, who recorded 21 points and 23 rebounds, which included 19 rebounds in the first half, in a March 27 game between the Celtics and the Thunder.

On June 23, it was reported that Stevens made the decision to hire Brooklyn Nets assistant coach Ime Udoka as his own replacement as head coach of the Celtics. The hiring became official five days later. Stevens later stated that he hired Udoka because the latter had "a great approachability." In Udoka's first year as head coach and Stevens' first year as an executive, the Celtics overcame an 18–21 start and ended up finishing as the #2-seed in the Eastern Conference with a 51–31 record. During the turnaround, Stevens and the Celtics traded Josh Richardson, Romeo Langford, a 2022 first-round pick (which turned into Blake Wesley), and the rights to swap 2028 first-round picks to the San Antonio Spurs in exchange for Derrick White, who became a key contributor for the Celtics. In the playoffs, the Celtics swept the Brooklyn Nets during the first round and then went on to beat the Milwaukee Bucks in seven games during the Eastern Conference Semifinals. After defeating the Miami Heat in seven games during the Eastern Conference Finals, the Celtics made their first NBA Finals appearance since 2010. However, the Celtics lost the 2022 NBA Finals to the Golden State Warriors in six games despite a 2–1 lead.

=== 2022–23 season ===
On July 9, 2022, Stevens and the Celtics traded Aaron Nesmith, Daniel Theis, Nik Stauskas, Malik Fitts, Juwan Morgan, and a 2023 first-round draft pick to the Indiana Pacers in exchange for Malcolm Brogdon. On September 22, Stevens and the Celtics suspended Udoka for the entire 2022–23 season for violating team policies pertaining to an improper intimate relationship with a female Celtics staff member. Assistant coach Joe Mazzulla replaced Udoka as the interim head coach. On February 16, 2023, Stevens and the Celtics named Mazzulla the team's permanent head coach and signed him to an extension after Mazzulla led the Celtics to a league-best 42–17 record at the NBA All-Star break. The Celtics entered the playoffs as the #2-seed in the Eastern Conference with a 57–25 record. They went on to beat the Atlanta Hawks in six games during the first round and the Philadelphia 76ers in seven games during the Eastern Conference Semifinals. However, the Celtics lost to the #8-seed Miami Heat during the Eastern Conference Finals in seven games.

=== 2023–24 season ===
Stevens and the Celtics retained Mazzulla as head coach for the 2023–24 season, with Stevens calling Mazzulla "a terrific leader" and "accountable." On June 22, 2023, Stevens and the Celtics traded Marcus Smart to the Memphis Grizzlies as part of a three-team deal that sent Kristaps Porziņģis to the Celtics and Tyus Jones to Washington. The trade also involved the Grizzlies sending a 2023 first-round pick (pick No. 25) and a top-four-protected 2024 first-round pick (via Golden State Warriors) to the Celtics. A few months later on October 1, Stevens and the Celtics traded Robert Williams III, Malcolm Brogdon, and two future first-round draft picks to the Portland Trail Blazers in exchange for Jrue Holiday.

On April 30, 2024, Stevens was awarded the NBA Executive of the Year Award for the 2023–24 season. The Celtics went on to beat the Miami Heat and Cleveland Cavaliers in five games during the first round and Eastern Conference Semifinals, respectively. After completing a 4–0 sweep of the Indiana Pacers in the Eastern Conference Finals, the Celtics advanced to the 2024 NBA Finals. They went on to beat the Dallas Mavericks in five games, giving Stevens his first NBA Championship.

== Coaching style ==
According to Stevens, in one of his first games as head coach, he was nervous and "felt like our team played on edge" because of it. Stevens decided that a team's play will reflect its coach's mood; a calm coach means a team that will remain poised in difficult game situations, while a nervous coach means a team that plays on edge. "I don't want to lose a game because of my approach," he told himself. Accordingly, Stevens developed a strategy of always remaining calm and focused during games. He rarely raises his voice or gets emotional, instead quietly observing on the sideline with folded arms. Stevens does not get upset about bad calls by referees or player mistakes, preferring to focus on "the next play" rather than what just happened. Butler player Willie Veasley explained Butler's 2010 Final Four run by saying, "When those big runs [by Syracuse and Kansas State] came, Coach called a timeout and said a few calm words. Then he said he believes in us, he loves us and we're going to win the game." On the rare occasion Stevens feels the need to correct a player, he does it with "positive reinforcement, just at a little louder decibel", according to former assistant coach Matthew Graves. Above all, Stevens wants his players to be confident, not living in fear of being yanked for making a bad play.

Externally, Stevens is always calm, but internally, he is far from it. "I'm not as calm as everybody thinks," Stevens says. His wife Tracy adds, "He's calm and collected, but he's fiercely competitive. He's always thinking about how he can beat you." Former player Joel Cornette says, "Everyone sees Brad as a level-headed, calm and cool coach, but he's about as competitive of a guy as I know. We would get into it constantly, whether playing two-on-two or arguing about players' having better college careers."

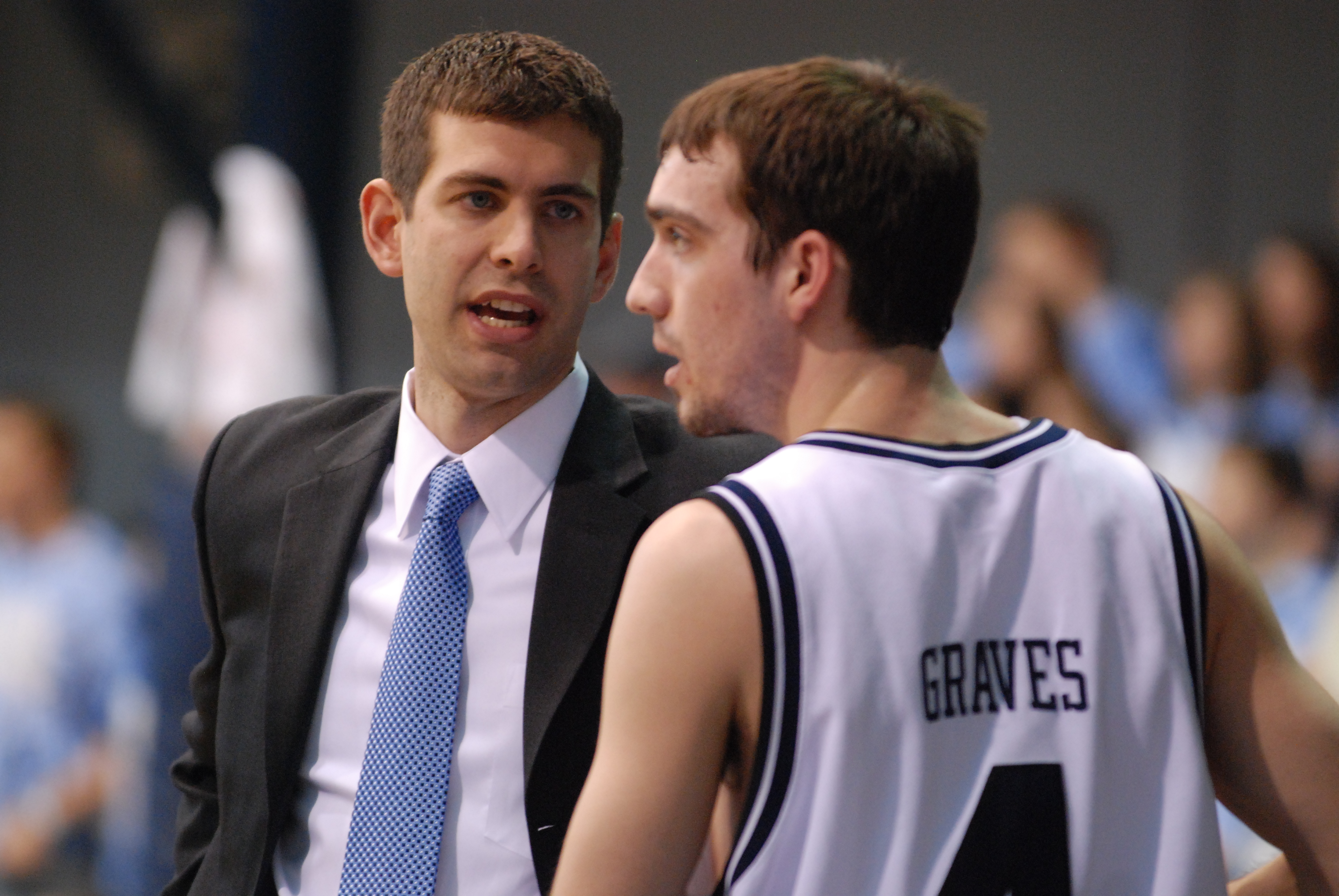
Stevens talking with player A. J. Graves during a 2008 game against Detroit

Stevens spends a lot of time preparing for each game, and always tries to add a few new wrinkles specific to that game's opponent. Sports Illustrated calls him an expert "on breaking down tape and looking at statistical trends to find opponents' weaknesses." Former player Ronald Nored agrees: "We know everything we need to about our opponents, all their tendencies are broken down" ahead of time.

Stevens is a proponent of statistical analysis to enhance his coaching decisions, spending almost as much time looking at statistics as watching game film. "I think it's a unique way of looking at the game that may be able to help best communicate to your players", Stevens explains. For example, when Butler was slumping in late 2010, Stevens challenged his team: "this [46% defensive field goal percentage] is where we are. This isn't acceptable to get to where we want to go. But what does that really mean? It's not just get better defensively, it is, if we give up three less baskets a game, then we will be at 40 percent field goal percentage defense which will be top 20 in the country." The team got the message, improved throughout the season, and ultimately went on a March run fueled by defense. In 2012, Stevens became the first college coach to hire someone solely for statistical research when he added Drew Cannon to the staff. If he had the resources, Stevens says he would hire a team of statisticians to analyze the team's play.

Stevens' teams are built around solid basketball fundamentals and good teamwork rather than individual basketball skill. His teams are known for their defense, forcing opponents into uncharacteristic mistakes. Stevens says that the secret to basketball—and life—is "just to do the job to the best of your ability and don't worry about anything else." He also states, "Win the next game. Win the next possession. That's our focus. It's boring. It's also the way championships are won." In short, Stevens is a strong believer in "The Butler Way"—doing all the little things that transform a group of good basketball players into a great basketball team. "I tell the players 'the Butler Way' isn't easy to define," Stevens says, "but you can see it on the floor when we share the basketball, play with great energy and defend."

Stevens prefers to recruit strong team players instead of going after "top recruits." He says, "The guys we [have] recruited, most of them weren't very highly ranked. They had very good high school careers or careers at other places (transfers), but for one reason or the other they weren't seen as great players. But they all had intangibles." Stevens puts a strong emphasis on education and has said he would only recruit a "one and done" player if he was committed to getting his degree while playing professionally.

Stevens has often been referred to as a coaching prodigy, but is not interested in self-promotion. Stevens instead prefers to deflect the praise he receives to the players, athletic department, and his mentors. Stevens has not been known to posture for more money, or to leak his name for open coaching positions. Stevens has been described as humble, modest, and not "about the money."

The New York Times, USA Today, ESPN, and other commentators attributed Butler's success against teams with superior athletes to Stevens' coaching style. The Times remarked, "the Bulldogs are very well prepared for their opponents, and they do not rattle easily", and says that the resulting confidence has led to the team's success. "He coaches to his personality and to his strengths," Collier says. "Obviously, he has great rapport and communication ability with his team." Yahoo! Sports compared Stevens to legendary coach John Wooden, writing: "Brad Stevens is winning at Butler the Wooden way—calm and composed on the sideline." Wooden agreed, saying, "I enjoy watching [Stevens] and very much enjoy [Butler's] style of play."

With background at his short Eli Lilly stint, Stevens also gave a priority to mental health in his locker room. Stevens implemented wellness programs and invited Dr. Stephanie Pinder-Amaker, founding director of McLean Hospital's College Mental Health Program, to speak to his players.

== Personal life ==
Stevens is known for projecting a professional, "corporate" look from the sidelines. Asked what his life would be like if he had never taken up coaching, Stevens replied, "If everything else remained the same, I would have been as happy as heck... Friends and family and faith, they're going to take the cake over all this stuff." Stevens met his wife, Tracy (née Wilhelmy), while attending DePauw University. Tracy, who played soccer for DePauw, quickly learned of Brad's love for basketball; on their third date, he drove her an hour and a half to attend a high school basketball game. Tracy graduated from Rocky River High School in 1995, and from DePauw in 1999. She returned to school in 2000, driving five hours from Case Western's law school to Indianapolis on weekends to see Stevens. Tracy finished her final year of law school in Indianapolis, and the couple got married in August 2003. Tracy works as a labor and employment lawyer, and also serves as Stevens' agent. Stevens and his wife have two children, Kinsley and Brady. Brady plays basketball at Notre Dame.

Brad and Tracy are involved with the American Cancer Society's Coaches vs. Cancer. Stevens says that the cause really hit home for them after Tracy's mother died of the disease in June 2004. The day before Butler's 2010 Final Four appearance, they hosted a fundraiser for the organization. Stevens has also volunteered his time to the Jukes Foundation for Kids, a charity benefiting Ugandan children run by former Butler player Avery Jukes. Stevens remains in close contact with the Butler basketball family; he notably took a one-game leave from the Celtics in January 2016 to visit with Andrew Smith, a player on both of Butler's Final Four teams who was dying of cancer; Smith died less than a week later. At the request of Andrew's widow, Sam, Stevens delivered the eulogy at the memorial service on January 17, 2016.

Stevens' father, Mark, is an orthopedic surgeon in Indianapolis who played college football for Indiana. His mother, Jan, is a university professor who has previously taught at Butler.

== Head coaching record ==
=== College ===
Record table
Season	Team	Overall	Conference	Standing	Postseason
Butler Bulldogs (Horizon League) (2007–2012)
2007–08	Butler	30–4	16–2	1st	NCAA Division I Round of 32
2008–09	Butler	26–6	15–3	1st	NCAA Division I Round of 64
2009–10	Butler	33–5	18–0	1st	NCAA Division I Runner-Up
2010–11	Butler	28–10	13–5	T–1st	NCAA Division I Runner-Up
2011–12	Butler	22–15	11–7	T–3rd	CBI Semifinal
Butler Bulldogs (Atlantic 10 Conference) (2012–2013)
2012–13	Butler	27–9	11–5	T–3rd	NCAA Division I Round of 32
Butler:		166–49 (.772)	84–22 (.792)		
Total:		166–49 (.772)			
National champion Postseason invitational champion Conference regular season champion Conference regular season and conference tournament champion Division regular season champion Division regular season and conference tournament champion Conference tournament champion

=== NBA ===
Legend
Regular season	G	Games coached	W	Games won	L	Games lost	W–L %	Win–loss %
Playoffs	PG	Playoff games	PW	Playoff wins	PL	Playoff losses	PW–L %	Playoff win–loss %

Team	Year	G	W	L	W–L%	Finish	PG	PW	PL	PW–L%	Result
Boston	2013–14	82	25	57	.305	4th in Atlantic	—	—	—	—	Missed Playoffs
Boston	2014–15	82	40	42	.488	2nd in Atlantic	4	0	4	.000	Lost in First round
Boston	2015–16	82	48	34	.585	2nd in Atlantic	6	2	4	.333	Lost in First round
Boston	2016–17	82	53	29	.646	1st in Atlantic	18	9	9	.500	Lost in Conference finals
Boston	2017–18	82	55	27	.671	2nd in Atlantic	19	11	8	.579	Lost in Conference finals
Boston	2018–19	82	49	33	.598	3rd in Atlantic	9	5	4	.556	Lost in Conference semifinals
Boston	2019–20	72	48	24	.667	2nd in Atlantic	17	10	7	.588	Lost in Conference finals
Boston	2020–21	72	36	36	.500	4th in Atlantic	5	1	4	.200	Lost in First round
Career		636	354	282	.557		78	38	40	.487	

== Awards and honors ==
NBA

- 2017 NBA All-Star Game head coach
- 2024 NBA Executive of the Year
- 2024 NBA Champion (as Boston Celtics president of basketball operations)
- 2026 NBA Executive of the Year

NCAA

- Two-time Horizon League Coach of the Year (2009, 2010)
- Three-time Undisputed Horizon League Champion (regular season and conference tournament - 2008, 2010, 2011 as head coach at Butler)

== See also ==
- List of NCAA Division I Men's Final Four appearances by coach

Sporting positions
Preceded by Danny Ainge	Boston Celtics General Manager; 2021–present	Incumbent
