= Matthew Graves =

American basketball player and coach (born 1974)

Current position
- Title: Head coach
- Team: Indiana State
- Conference: MVC
- Record: 25–39 (.391)

Biographical details
- Born: November 9, 1974 (age 51)

Playing career
- 1993–1998: Butler
- Position: Guard

Coaching career (HC unless noted)
- 2000–2010: Butler (assistant)
- 2010–2013: Butler (associate HC)
- 2013–2018: South Alabama
- 2018–2019: Evansville (assistant)
- 2019–2021: Xavier (sp. assistant to the HC)
- 2021–2024: Indiana State (associate HC)
- 2024–present: Indiana State

Head coaching record
- Overall: 90–135 (.400)

Matthew Graves (born November 9, 1974) is an American college basketball coach and former player who is currently the head coach at Indiana State University. He was previously the head coach at the University of South Alabama.

Graves grew up playing basketball with his three brothers in the small town of Switz City, Indiana. He played college basketball for the Butler Bulldogs from 1993 to 1998. Graves was selected as the team's most valuable player for the 1997–98 season after leading Butler to the NCAA tournament for the second consecutive year. He also made the All-Horizon Tournament team and GTE Academic All-District team that year. After college, Graves served on the coaching staff of two high school teams before joining the Butler staff in 2001. In 2010, he was promoted to associate head coach under Brad Stevens. Graves was listed as one of the top assistant coaches in college basketball on multiple occasions prior to his promotion to head coach.

== Early life ==
Matthew Graves is the son of Rick and Melonie Graves. One of four children, all boys, Graves grew up in the small town of Switz City, Indiana (population 311). "A big night in Switz City is probably going to the local movie theater, then to McDonald's," remarked Graves. Growing up, the Graves brothers were obsessed with basketball. At one point, the Graveses had six basketball hoops set up at different heights in their backyard so that each of the boys could practice at a different level. Graves played basketball for White River Valley High School, where he was an All-State honorable mention recipient his junior year.

Two of Graves' three brothers, A. J. and Andrew, also played basketball for Butler. Matthew and A. J. were born eleven years apart, so shared little in common, except for basketball. By the time A. J. Graves was in college, Matthew was on the Butler staff. Commenting on the experience of having a coach and player son simultaneously Rick Graves said, "Matthew sees everything that A. J. does wrong, and it causes a little tension. But would we do it again? Yes, we would. It has not been a bad experience by any means. And it's easier for Mom and Dad, because we can watch them both." Matthew said the experience brought him closer to his brother. "To be around him every day for three years, to watch him grow as a player and a person, it [was] a privilege", Graves remarked.

== College ==
Graves played college basketball for Butler from 1993 to 1998. In 1997, he was part of the first Butler team to make the NCAA Tournament in 35 years. During the 1997–98 season, Graves was selected as the team's most valuable player after leading the Bulldogs to their second consecutive league title and NCAA Tournament appearance. That season, he led the Horizon League in free throw shooting and was named to the All-Horizon Tournament team after scoring 18 in the championship game.

Graves finished his career with 175 made three pointers, second most ever by a Butler player at the time, and finished third place all-time in free throw percentage at 84.6%. He scored a career high of 42 points against Cleveland State, fifth most by a Butler player in a single game. In total, Graves scored 994 points during his Butler career.

Graves was named to the GTE Academic All-District team for the 1997–98 season. He earned a Bachelor of Science degree in education, specialization chemistry, in 1998. He received a master's degree in education administration from Butler in 2003.

== Coaching career ==
After college, Graves served as an assistant coach at North Central High School for two years and at Ben Davis High School for one. In 2001, he joined the Butler coaching staff as coordinator of basketball operations under Todd Lickliter. He spent two seasons in the position before being promoted to assistant coaching in 2003. He continued to work his way up the coaching ranks at Butler, becoming associate head coach under Brad Stevens in 2010. In addition to coaching, Graves' duties at Butler included recruiting and non-league scheduling.

In 2008, Fox Sports listed Graves as one of the Top 10 Mid-Major Assistants. In 2009, College Insider listed Graves as number 2 on its list of Top 25 Mid-Major Assistants.

On March 25, 2013, Graves was named as the new head coach of the South Alabama Jaguars. Explaining his decision to take the job, Graves remarked "When I came down to look at campus, I was sold right away ... I understood there was history here. Good tradition. The Mitchell Center is a phenomenal facility to recruit to." Stevens said Graves was a "perfect fit" for the Jaguars and that he was "thrilled" for Graves. Graves had previously turned down Division II head coaching offers, saying he was waiting for the right job to come along.

On April 1, former Butler players Ronald Nored and Darnell Archey joined Miller's staff. Graves expects South Alabama to be competitive from day one. "We're here next year to compete for a championship," he told his players upon accepting the job. "This is a process where we’re going to have sustained success, starting next year. That is the goal from Day 1."

On March 8, 2018, South Alabama fired Graves after five seasons, which saw the team not making a postseason appearance in his time as head coach. A month later, on April 14, Graves was hired as an assistant coach for the Evansville men's basketball team under head coach Walter McCarty. Graves was joined on the staff by his former head coach at Butler, Todd Lickliter, who also became an assistant at Evansville. In August 2019, Graves was hired as a special assistant to Travis Steele at Xavier.

On October 20, 2025, before the start of the season, Indiana State announced that Graves, who had become their head basketball coach, would require triple bypass surgery and was taking medical leave. Associate head coach Mark Slessinger will be interim head coach.

== Coaching philosophy ==
When asked about what he would want in a head coaching position, Graves said "It's about establishing a culture. It's not [about] a recruiting quick fix. Establishing a program built on character and values is much more important to me than trying to figure out a quick way to win." Upon accepting the South Alabama job, Graves stated that he would attempt to instill a style of play similar to Butler's. He said to expect "very hard-nosed and tough" defensive play and "a defensive-oriented team". Graves said the offensive plan would change year-to-year based on player skill sets. He added that he will expect maximum hustle from his players at all times.

== Head coaching record ==
Record table
Season	Team	Overall	Conference	Standing	Postseason
South Alabama Jaguars (Sun Belt Conference) (2013–2018)
2013–14	South Alabama	11–20	5–13	9th	
2014–15	South Alabama	12–21	9–11	T–6th	
2015–16	South Alabama	14–19	8–12	T–7th	
2016–17	South Alabama	14–18	7–11	9th	
2017–18	South Alabama	14–18	7–11	T–9th	
South Alabama:		65–96 (.404)	36–58 (.383)		
Indiana State Sycamores (Missouri Valley Conference) (2024–present)
2024–25	Indiana State	14–18	8–12	T–8th	
2025–26	Indiana State	11–21	4–16	10th	
Indiana State:		25–39 (.391)	12–28 (.300)		
Total:		90–135 (.400)			

== Personal life ==
Graves is married to Susan Graves and has two daughters – Abigail and Lillian.
