= 2007–08 Valparaiso Crusaders men's basketball team =

American college basketball season

2007–08 Valparaiso Crusaders men's basketball
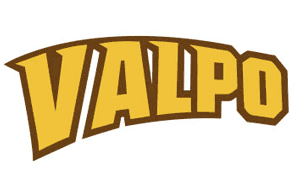
- Conference: Horizon League
- Record: 22–14 (9–9 Horizon)
- Head coach: Homer Drew
- Assistant coaches: Bryce Drew; Luke Gore; Chris Sparks
- Home arena: Athletics-Recreation Center

2007–08 Horizon League men's basketball standings
	Conf.				Overall
Team	W		L	PCT	W		L	PCT
No. 11 Butler †	16	–	2	.889	30	–	4	.882
Cleveland State	12	–	6	.667	21	–	13	.618
Wright State	12	–	6	.667	21	–	10	.677
Valparaiso	9	–	9	.500	22	–	14	.611
UIC	9	–	9	.500	18	–	15	.545
Green Bay	9	–	9	.500	15	–	15	.500
Milwaukee	9	–	9	.500	14	–	16	.467
Loyola Chicago	6	–	12	.333	12	–	19	.387
Youngstown State	5	–	13	.278	9	–	21	.300
Detroit	3	–	15	.167	7	–	23	.233
† Horizon League Tournament winner Rankings from AP Poll

The 2007–08 Valparaiso Crusaders men's basketball team was an NCAA Division I college basketball team competing in the Horizon League.

== Coaching staff ==
- Homer Drew – Head coach
- Bryce Drew – Associate head coach
- Luke Gore – Assistant coach
- Chris Sparks – Assistant coach
- Tarrance Price – Director of Basketball Operations

== Preseason ==
During the off-season, the Crusaders joined the Horizon League after previously competing in the Mid-Continent Conference.

== Awards ==
=== Horizon League Player of the Week ===
- Samuel Haanpää, week ending December 16

== Roster ==
Note: Flags indicate national team eligibility at FIBA sanctioned events. Players may hold other non-FIBA nationality not displayed.

No.	Position	Player
00	F	Urule Igbavboa
1	G	Michael Rogers
2	F	Benjamin Fumey
3	G	Matt Bennett
10	G	Brandon McPherson
11	C	Calum MacLeod

No.	Position	Player
13	G	Samuel Haanpää
14	G	Howard Little
23	G	Jarryd Loyd
33	G	Jake Diebler
35	F	Shawn Huff
44	F	Bryan Bouchie

== Schedule ==
Date time, TV	Opponent	Result	Record	Site city, state
11/12/2007*	Grace; South Padre Island Invitational	W 90–59	1–0	Athletics-Recreation Center (2,623); Valparaiso, IN
11/15/2007*	IPFW	W 74–64	2–0	Allen County War Memorial Coliseum (1,745); Fort Wayne, IN
11/20/2007*	at Vanderbilt; South Padre Island Invitational	L 78–87	2–1	Memorial Gymnasium (11,171); Nashville, TN
11/23/2007*	vs. Maryland Eastern Shore; South Padre Island Invitational	W 66–55	3–1	South Padre Island Convention Centre (500); South Padre Island, TX
11/24/2007*	vs. Austin Peay; South Padre Island Invitational	W 61–47	4–1	South Padre Island Convention Centre (500); South Padre Island, TX
11/28/2007*	Western Michigan	W 77–65	5–1	Athletics-Recreation Center (3,678); Valparaiso, IN
12/01/2007*; WYIN	Ball State	W 71–58	6–1	Athletics-Recreation Center (3,184); Valparaiso, IN
12/06/2007	at Wright State	W 71–66	7–1 (1–0)	Nutter Center (4,189); Dayton, OH
12/08/2007	at Detroit	W 81–68	8–1 (2–0)	Calihan Hall (1,552); Detroit, MI
12/11/2007*; WYIN	Evansville	W 75–67	9–1	Athletics-Recreation Center (3,123); Valparaiso, IN
12/15/2007*	Chicago State	W 90–61	10–1	Athletics-Recreation Center (3,645); Valparaiso, IN
12/22/2007*; Big Ten Network	at Wisconsin	L 58–68	10–2	Kohl Center (17,190); Madison, WI
12/30/2007*; FSN	at No. 1 North Carolina	L 58–90	10–3	Dean Smith Center (21,046); Chapel Hill, NC
01/02/2008*	Indiana Wesleyan	W 93–46	11–3	Athletics-Recreation Center (2,923); Valparaiso, IN
01/05/2008	at No. 16 Butler	L 65–73	11–4 (2–1)	Hinkle Fieldhouse (7,284); Indianapolis, IN
01/10/2008; Time Warner Sports Milwaukee	Milwaukee	L 69–71	11–5 (2–2)	Athletics-Recreation Center (3,945); Valparaiso, IN
01/12/2008	UWGB	W 82–73	12–5 (3–2)	Athletics-Recreation Center (4,197); Valparaiso, IN
01/17/2008; MY-YTV	at Youngstown State	W 67–61	13–5 (4–2)	Beeghly Center (3,349); Youngstown, OH
01/19/2008; STO	at Cleveland State	L 63–69	13–6 (4–3)	Wolstein Center (4,417); Cleveland, OH
01/24/2008; WYIN	UIC	W 60–56	14–6 (5–3)	Athletics-Recreation Center (4,008); Valparaiso, IN
01/26/2008; WYIN	Loyola(IL)	L 63–65	14–7 (5–4)	Athletics-Recreation Center (4,578); Valparaiso, IN
02/05/2008; ESPN2	No. 12 Butler	L 68–71	14–8 (5–5)	Athletics-Recreation Center (5,432); Valparaiso, IN
02/07/2008; WACY	at UWGB	L 71–76 ^{OT}	14–9 (5–6)	Resch Center (4,721); Green Bay, WI
02/11/2008; WYIN	at UIC	L 53–77	14–10 (5–7)	UIC Pavilion (3,264); Chicago, IL
02/14/2008; WYIN	Cleveland State	L 58–71	14–11 (5–8)	Athletics-Recreation Center (3,338); Valparaiso, IN
02/16/2008	Youngstown State	W 77–58	15–11 (6–8)	Athletics-Recreation Center (3,689); Valparaiso, IN
02/20/2008; WYIN	at Loyola(IL)	L 61–68	15–12 (6–9)	Joseph J. Gentile Center (2,101); Chicago, IL
02/23/2008*; ESPN Classic	Miami (Ohio); ESPNU Bracketbusters	W 99–94 ^{2OT}	16–12	Athletics-Recreation Center (4,035); Valparaiso, IN
02/25/2008; Time Warner Sports Milwaukee	at Milwaukee	W 66–57	17–12 (7–9)	U.S. Cellular Arena (3,115); Milwaukee, WI
02/28/2008; WYIN	Detroit	W 59–56	18–12 (8–9)	Athletics-Recreation Center (3,110); Valparaiso, IN
03/01/2008; ESPN2	Wright State	W 75–73 ^{OT}	19–12 (9–9)	Athletics-Recreation Center (4,935); Valparaiso, IN
03/04/2008*	UWGB; 2008 Horizon League men's basketball tournament	W 75–67	20–12	Athletics-Recreation Center (1,873); Valparaiso, IN
03/07/2008*	vs. Wright State; 2008 Horizon League Men's Basketball Tournament	W 72–67	21–12	Hinkle Fieldhouse (1,346); Indianapolis, IN
03/08/2008*; ESPNU	vs. Cleveland State; 2008 Horizon League Men's Basketball Tournament	L 73–78	21–13	Hinkle Fieldhouse (5,109); Indianapolis, IN
03/19/2008*; Fox College Sports	at Washington; 2008 College Basketball Invitational	W 72–71	22–13	Bank of America Arena (3,227); Seattle, WA
03/24/2008*	at Houston; 2008 College Basketball Invitational	L 67–91	22–14	Hofheinz Pavilion (3,082); Houston, TX
*Non-conference game. ^{#}Rankings from Associated Press. (#) Tournament seedings in parentheses. All times are in Central Time.
