= 2007–08 Milwaukee Panthers men's basketball team =

American college basketball season

2007–08 Milwaukee Panthers men's basketball
- Conference: Horizon League
- Record: 14–16 (9–9 Horizon)
- Head coach: Rob Jeter (3rd season)
- Assistant coaches: Duffy Conroy (4th season); Chad Boudreau (3rd season)
- Home arena: U.S. Cellular Arena

2007–08 Horizon League men's basketball standings
	Conf.				Overall
Team	W		L	PCT	W		L	PCT
No. 11 Butler †	16	–	2	.889	30	–	4	.882
Cleveland State	12	–	6	.667	21	–	13	.618
Wright State	12	–	6	.667	21	–	10	.677
Valparaiso	9	–	9	.500	22	–	14	.611
UIC	9	–	9	.500	18	–	15	.545
Green Bay	9	–	9	.500	15	–	15	.500
Milwaukee	9	–	9	.500	14	–	16	.467
Loyola Chicago	6	–	12	.333	12	–	19	.387
Youngstown State	5	–	13	.278	9	–	21	.300
Detroit	3	–	15	.167	7	–	23	.233
† Horizon League Tournament winner Rankings from AP Poll

The 2007–08 Milwaukee Panthers men's basketball team represented the University of Wisconsin–Milwaukee during the 2007–08 NCAA Division I men's basketball season. The Panthers, led by third-year head coach Rob Jeter, played their home games at the UW–Milwaukee Panther Arena as members of the Horizon League. They finished the season 14–16, 9–9 in Horizon League play to finish in fifth place. They lost in the first round of the Horizon League tournament to Loyola University Chicago.

== Previous season ==
The Panthers finished the 2006–07 season 9–22, 6–10 in Horizon League play to finish in seventh place. They lost in the first round of the Horizon League tournament 77–83 against the University of Illinois Chicago.

== Roster ==
2007–08 Milwaukee Panthers men's basketball team
Players
Coaches

Pos.	#	Name	Height	Weight	Year	Hometown
G	1	Charlie Swiggett	6 ft 1 in (1.85 m)	180 lb (82 kg)	So	Chester, Pennsylvania
G	2	Deonte Roberts	6 ft 3 in (1.91 m)	190 lb (86 kg)	Fr	St. Paul, Minnesota
G	4	Deion James	6 ft 2 in (1.88 m)	190 lb (86 kg)	Jr	Milwaukee, Wisconsin
G	5	Ricky Franklin	6 ft 1 in (1.85 m)	200 lb (91 kg)	Jr	Milwaukee, Wisconsin
G	10	Zach Holt	5 ft 6 in (1.68 m)	160 lb (73 kg)	So	Pulaski, Tennessee
G	12	Allan Hanson	6 ft 0 in (1.83 m)	170 lb (77 kg)	Sr	Wauwatosa, Wisconsin
G	22	Kaylan Anderson	6 ft 5 in (1.96 m)	195 lb (88 kg)	So	Toronto, Ontario
F	23	Anthony Hill	6 ft 7 in (2.01 m)	230 lb (104 kg)	Fr	Milwaukee, Wisconsin
F	24	Marcus Skinner	6 ft 6 in (1.98 m)	215 lb (98 kg)	Sr	Flint, Michigan
F	25	Paige Paulsen	6 ft 7 in (2.01 m)	220 lb (100 kg)	Sr	Custer, South Dakota
G	32	Brad Carroll	6 ft 6 in (1.98 m)	200 lb (91 kg)	Fr	Chandler, Arizona
F	44	Joe Allen	6 ft 6 in (1.98 m)	230 lb (104 kg)	Jr	Milwaukee, Wisconsin
F	52	Jason Averkamp	6 ft 6 in (1.98 m)	230 lb (104 kg)	So	New Berlin, Wisconsin

Head coach

- Rob Jeter (UW–Platteville)

Assistant coach(es)

- Chad Boudreau (Hannibal–LaGrange)
- Duffy Conroy (St. Ambrose)

Legend

- (C) Team captain
- (S) Suspended
- (I) Ineligible
- (W) Walk-on
- Injured
- Current redshirt

Roster
Last update: September 7, 2022

== Schedule and results ==
Date time, TV	Rank^{#}	Opponent^{#}	Result	Record	Site (attendance) city, state
Regular season
Nov 9, 2007*; 7:00 pm		Upper Iowa	W 78–53	1–0	U.S. Cellular Arena (3,024); Milwaukee, WI
Nov 14, 2007*; 6:00 pm		at Ball State	W 81–74 ^{OT}	2–0	Worthen Arena (3,307); Muncie, IN
Nov 18, 2007*; 2:00 pm		Northern Iowa	L 66–73	2–1	U.S. Cellular Arena (3,130); Milwaukee, WI
Nov 20, 2007*; 7:00 pm		South Dakota State	W 89–80	3–1	U.S. Cellular Arena (2,733); Milwaukee, WI
Nov 24, 2007*; 7:00 pm		Drake	L 59–80	3–2	U.S. Cellular Arena (3,550); Milwaukee, WI
Nov 27, 2007*; 7:00 pm		Sam Houston	L 77-81	3-3	U.S. Cellular Arena (2,485); Milwaukee, WI
Nov 30, 2007*; 7:30 pm		at No. 13 Marquette	L 65-100	3-4	BMO Harris Bradley Center (18,283); Milwaukee, WI
Dec 6, 2007; 7:00 pm		at Illinois Chicago	L 73-91	3-5 (0–1)	Credit Union 1 Arena (3,482); Chicago IL
Dec 8, 2007; 7:00 pm		at Loyola	L 68-73 ^{OT}	3-6 (0–2)	Joseph J. Gentile Arena (1,842); Chicago IL
Dec 12, 2007*; 7:00 pm		Wisconsin–Madison	L 39-61	3-7	U.S. Cellular Arena (10,017); Milwaukee, WI
Dec 19, 2007*; 7:00 pm		Central Michigan	W 74-71	4-7	U.S. Cellular Arena (2,555); Milwaukee, WI
Dec 29, 2007*; 2:30 pm		at Wyoming	W 80-66	5-7	Arena-Auditorium (5,155); Laramie, WY
Jan 3, 2008; 7:00 pm		Wright State	W 75-64	6-7 (1–2)	U.S. Cellular Arena (2,663); Milwaukee, WI
Jan 5, 2008; 7:00 pm		Detroit Mercy	W 55-53	7-7 (2-2)	U.S. Cellular Arena (3,410); Milwaukee, WI
Jan 7, 2008; 4:35 pm		at Youngstown State	W 61-39	8-7 (3-2)	Beeghly Center (1,247); Youngstown, OH
Jan 10, 2008; 7:05 pm		at Valparaiso	W 71-69	9-7 (4-2)	Athletics–Recreation Center (3,945); Valparaiso, IN
Jan 12, 2008; 1:00 pm		at No. 14 Butler	L 56-72	9-8 (4-3)	Hinkle Fieldhouse (4,698); Indianapolis, IN
Jan 19, 2008; 7:05 pm		at Green Bay	W 65-61	10-8 (5-3)	Resch Center (5,587); Green Bay, WI
Jan 24, 2008; 7:00 pm		Youngstown State	W 76-69	11-8 (6-3)	U.S. Cellular Arena (3,370); Milwaukee, WI
Jan 26, 2008; 7:00 pm		Cleveland State	W 79-71	12-8 (7-3)	U.S. Cellular Arena (3,725); Milwaukee, WI
Jan 31, 2008; 6:05 pm		at Detroit Mercy	L 61-72	12-9 (7-4)	Calihan Hall (1,428); Detroit, MI
Feb 2, 2008; 6:00 pm		at Wright State	L 51-53	12-10 (7-5)	Nutter Center (6,700); Fairborn, OH
Feb 12, 2008; 6:00 pm		No. 9 Butler	L 75-83 ^{OT}	12-11 (7-6)	U.S. Cellular Arena (4,055); Milwaukee, WI
Feb 16, 2008; 7:00 pm		Green Bay	W 66-56	13-11 (8-6)	U.S. Cellular Arena (5,410); Milwaukee, WI
Feb 20, 2008; 6:00 pm		at Cleveland State	L 64-74	13-12 (8-7)	Wolstein Center (2,174); Cleveland, OH
Feb 23, 2008*; 9:00 pm		at Bradley	L 72-84	13-13	Carver Arena (10,670); Peoria IL
Feb 25, 2008; 8:00 pm		Valparaiso	L 57-66	13-14 (8-8)	U.S. Cellular Arena (3,115); Milwaukee, WI
Feb 28, 2008; 7:00 pm		at Loyola	W 68-53	14-14 (9-8)	U.S. Cellular Arena (3,062); Milwaukee, WI
Mar 1, 2008; 7:00 pm		Illinois-Chicago	L 55-63	14-15 (9-9)	U.S. Cellular Arena (3,425); Milwaukee, WI
Horizon League tournament
Mar 4, 2008; 7:00 pm	(5)	(8) Loyola; First round	L 51-57	14-16	U.S. Cellular Arena (2,017); Milwaukee, WI
*Non-conference game. ^{#}Rankings from AP Poll. (#) Tournament seedings in parentheses. All times are in Central Time.
