= Tracy Stevens =

Tracy Stevens may refer to:

- Tracy Stevens, a labor and employment lawyer, married to Brad Stevens
- Tracy Stevens (character), a character from the American science fiction web television series For All Mankind
