= 2007–08 Butler Bulldogs men's basketball team =

American college basketball season

2007–08 Butler Bulldogs men's basketball
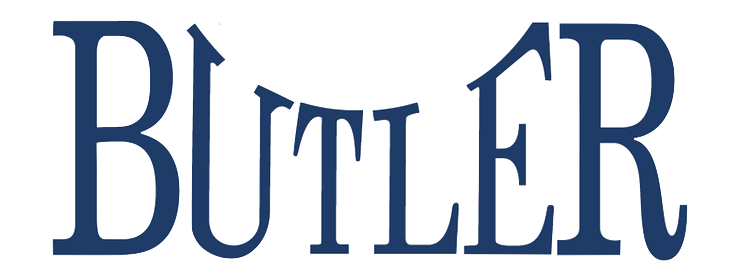

2008 Great Alaska Shoot-Out champion Wooden Tradition Winner Horizon League regular season champion Horizon League tournament champion

NCAA tournament, second round
- Conference: Horizon League

Ranking
- Coaches: No. 14
- AP: No. 11
- Record: 30–4 (16–2 Horizon)
- Head coach: Brad Stevens (1st season)
- Assistant coaches: Matthew Graves; Brandon Miller; Terry Johnson
- MVPs: Mike Green; A. J. Graves
- Captains: A. J. Graves; Mike Green; Julian Betko; Drew Streicher; Pete Campbell
- Home arena: Hinkle Fieldhouse

2007–08 Horizon League men's basketball standings
	Conf.				Overall
Team	W		L	PCT	W		L	PCT
No. 11 Butler †	16	–	2	.889	30	–	4	.882
Cleveland State	12	–	6	.667	21	–	13	.618
Wright State	12	–	6	.667	21	–	10	.677
Valparaiso	9	–	9	.500	22	–	14	.611
UIC	9	–	9	.500	18	–	15	.545
Green Bay	9	–	9	.500	15	–	15	.500
Milwaukee	9	–	9	.500	14	–	16	.467
Loyola Chicago	6	–	12	.333	12	–	19	.387
Youngstown State	5	–	13	.278	9	–	21	.300
Detroit	3	–	15	.167	7	–	23	.233
† Horizon League Tournament winner Rankings from AP Poll

The 2007–08 Butler Bulldogs men's basketball team represented Butler University in the 2007–08 NCAA Division I men's basketball season. Their head coach was Brad Stevens, serving his 1st year. The Bulldogs played their home games at the Hinkle Fieldhouse, which has a capacity of approximately 10,000.

The Bulldogs won the 2008 Horizon League Men's Basketball Regular Season Championship and the 2008 Horizon League Men's Basketball tournament championship, earning the Horizon League's automatic bid to the 2008 NCAA Division I men's basketball tournament, earning a 7 seed in the East Region. They beat 10 seed South Alabama 81–61 before falling to 2 seed Tennessee 71–76 in overtime in the Round of 32.

== Roster ==
2007–08 Butler Bulldogs men's basketball team
Players
Coaches

Pos.	#	Name	Height	Weight	Year	Hometown
G/F	11	Alex Anglin (W)	6 ft 4 in (1.93 m)	171 lb (78 kg)	Fr	Kokomo, Indiana
G/F	1	Julian Betko (C)	6 ft 5 in (1.96 m)	200 lb (91 kg)	Sr	Ružomberok, Slovakia
F	34	Pete Campbell (C)	6 ft 7 in (2.01 m)	200 lb (91 kg)	Sr	Muncie, Indiana
F/C	50	Elliot Engelmann	6 ft 7 in (2.01 m)	205 lb (93 kg)	So	Downers Grove, Illinois
G	4	A. J. Graves (C)	6 ft 1 in (1.85 m)	155 lb (70 kg)	Sr	Switz City, Indiana
G	10	Mike Green (C)	6 ft 1 in (1.85 m)	175 lb (79 kg)	Sr	Philadelphia, Pennsylvania
G	3	Zach Hahn	6 ft 1 in (1.85 m)	170 lb (77 kg)	Fr	New Castle, Indiana
F	54	Matt Howard	6 ft 8 in (2.03 m)	230 lb (104 kg)	Fr	Connersville, Indiana
F	24	Avery Jukes	6 ft 8 in (2.03 m)	217 lb (98 kg)	So	Snellville, Georgia
G	22	Grant Leiendecker	6 ft 3 in (1.91 m)	178 lb (81 kg)	RS Fr	Fort Wayne, Indiana
G	14	Nick Rodgers (W)	6 ft 1 in (1.85 m)	162 lb (73 kg)	So	Noblesville, Indiana
G	5	Ben Slaton (W)	6 ft 1 in (1.85 m)	160 lb (73 kg)	Jr	Columbus, Indiana
G/F	32	Drew Streicher (C)	6 ft 7 in (2.01 m)	200 lb (91 kg)	Sr	Washington, Indiana
G	2	Shawn Vanzant	6 ft 1 in (1.85 m)	171 lb (78 kg)	Fr	Tampa, Florida
G/F	21	Willie Veasley	6 ft 3 in (1.91 m)	204 lb (93 kg)	So	Freeport, Illinois

Head coach

- Brad Stevens (DePauw)

Assistant coach(es)

- Matthew Graves (Butler)
- Brandon Miller (Butler)
- Terry Johnson (Purdue Fort Wayne)

Legend

- (C) Team captain
- (S) Suspended
- (I) Ineligible
- (W) Walk-on
- Injured
- Current redshirt

Roster
Last update: 12 May 2010

== Schedule ==
Date time, TV	Rank^{#}	Opponent^{#}	Result	Record	Site city, state
Exhibition
Nov 1, 2007*; 7:00 pm		St. Joseph's (IN)	W 75–50		Hinkle Fieldhouse; Indianapolis, IN
Nov 3, 2007*; 7:00 pm		Marian (IN)	W 83–49		Hinkle Fieldhouse; Indianapolis, IN
Non-conference regular season
Nov 9, 2007*; 7:05 pm		at Ball State	W 61–45	1–0	John E. Worthen Arena (7,331); Muncie, IN
Nov 14, 2007*; 7:00 pm		Indiana State	W 76–48	2–0	Hinkle Fieldhouse (3,555); Indianapolis, IN
Nov 17, 2007*; 8:05 pm		at Evansville	W 60–47	3–0	Roberts Municipal Stadium (6,407); Evansville, IN
Nov 21, 2007*; 7:30 pm, ESPN2	No. 23	vs. Michigan; Great Alaska Shootout	W 79–65	4–0	Sullivan Arena (7,265); Anchorage, AK
Nov 23, 2007*; 5:30 pm, ESPN360	No. 23	vs. Virginia Tech; Great Alaska Shootout Semifinals	W 84–78 ^{OT}	5–0	Sullivan Arena (8,469); Anchorage, AK
Nov 24, 2007*; 8:30 pm, ESPN2	No. 23	vs. Texas Tech; Great Alaska Shootout Championship	W 81–71	6–0	Sullivan Arena (8,700); Anchorage, AK
Dec 1, 2007*; 7:30 pm, ESPNU	No. 16	Ohio State	W 65–46	7–0	Hinkle Fieldhouse (10,000); Indianapolis, IN
Dec 6, 2007; 7:05 pm	No. 13	at Detroit	W 53–46	8–0 (1–0)	Calihan Hall (3,136); Detroit, MI
Dec 8, 2007; 7:00 pm	No. 13	at Wright State	L 42–43	8–1 (1–1)	Nutter Center (6,981); Dayton, OH
Dec 15, 2007*; 6:07 pm, HDNet / WNDY	No. 19	vs. Florida State; Wooden Tradition	W 79–68	9–1	Conseco Fieldhouse (17,170); Indianapolis, IN
Dec 19, 2007*; 7:00 pm	No. 18	Bradley	W 83–64	10–1	Hinkle Fieldhouse (4,596); Indianapolis, IN
Dec 22, 2007*; 7:00 pm	No. 18	at Florida Gulf Coast	W 78–66	11–1	Alico Arena (3,843); Fort Myers, FL
Dec 28, 2007*; 8:00 pm, ESPNU	No. 17	at Southern Illinois	W 57–55	12–1	SIU Arena (9,386); Carbondale, IL
Horizon League Play
Jan 5, 2008; 2:00 pm	No. 17	Valparaiso	W 73–65	13–1 (2–1)	Hinkle Fieldhouse (7,284); Indianapolis, IN
Jan 7, 2008; 7:00 pm	No. 14	at Loyola (IL)	W 66–55	14–1 (3–1)	Joseph J. Gentile Center (2,100); Chicago, IL
Jan 10, 2008; 9:00 pm	No. 14	Green Bay	W 74–65	15–1 (4–1)	Hinkle Fieldhouse (3,226); Indianapolis, IN
Jan 12, 2008; 2:00 pm	No. 14	Milwaukee	W 72–56	16–1 (5–1)	Hinkle Fieldhouse (4,698); Indianapolis, IN
Jan 17, 2008; 7:35 pm	No. 12	at Cleveland State	L 52–56	16–2 (5–2)	Wolstein Center (5,352); Cleveland, OH
Jan 19, 2008; 7:15 pm	No. 12	at Youngstown State	W 78–69	17-2 (6–2)	Beeghly Center (6,198); Youngstown, OH
Jan 24, 2008; 7:00 pm	No. 14	Loyola (IL)	W 63–50	18-2 (7–2)	Hinkle Fieldhouse (3,822); Indianapolis, IN
Jan 26, 2008; 2:00 pm	No. 14	Illinois-Chicago	W 73–57	19–2 (8–2)	Hinkle Fieldhouse (4,952); Indianapolis, IN
Feb 5, 2008; 8:00 pm, ESPN2	No. 11	at Valparaiso	W 71–68	20–2 (9–2)	Athletics–Recreation Center (5,432); Valparaiso, IN
Feb 9, 2008; 7:05 pm	No. 11	at Green Bay	W 62–57	21–2 (10–2)	Resch Center (6,984); Green Bay, WI
Feb 12, 2008; 6:00 pm	No. 10	at Milwaukee	W 83–75 ^{OT}	22–2 (11–2)	U.S. Cellular Arena (4,055); Milwaukee, WI
Feb 14, 2008; 7:00 pm	No. 10	Youngstown St.	W 89–73	23–2 (12–2)	Hinkle Fieldhouse (4,702); Indianapolis, IN
Feb 16, 2008; 2:00 pm	No. 10	Cleveland St.	W 51–46	24–2 (13–2)	Hinkle Fieldhouse (8,279); Indianapolis, IN
Feb 20, 2008; 7:00 pm	No. 8	at Illinois-Chicago	W 51–46	25–2 (14–2)	UIC Pavilion (7,799); Chicago, IL
Feb 23, 2008*; 5:05 pm, ESPN2	No. 8	No. 18 Drake; BracketBuster	L 64–71	25–3	Hinkle Fieldhouse (10,000); Indianapolis, IN
Feb 28, 2008; 9:00 pm	No. 13	Wright St.	W 66–61	26–3 (15–2)	Hinkle Fieldhouse (6,045); Indianapolis, IN
Mar 1, 2008; 2:00 pm	No. 13	Detroit	W 65–31	27–3 (16–2)	Hinkle Fieldhouse (7,880); Indianapolis, IN
Horizon League tournament
Mar 8, 2008; 7:10 pm, ESPNU	(1) No. 12	(4) Illinois-Chicago; Horizon League Semifinals	W 66–50	28–3	Hinkle Fieldhouse (5,109); Indianapolis, IN
Mar 11, 2008; 9:00 pm, ESPN	(1) No. 10	(2) Cleveland St. Horizon League Championship	W 70–55	29–3	Hinkle Fieldhouse (5,021); Indianapolis, IN
NCAA tournament
Mar 21, 2008*; 3:00 pm, CBS	(7 E) No. 10	vs. (10 E) South Alabama; First Round	W 81–61	30–3	BJCC (14,420); Birmingham, AL
Mar 23, 2008*; 2:30 pm, CBS	(7 E) No. 10	vs. (2 E) No. 6 Tennessee; Second Round	L 71–76 ^{OT}	30–4	BJCC (14,606); Birmingham, AL
*Non-conference game. ^{#}Rankings from Coaches' Poll. (#) Tournament seedings in parentheses. E=East Region. All times are in Eastern Time..

== Rankings ==
Ranking movement Legend: ██ Improvement in ranking. ██ Decrease in ranking.
Poll	Pre	Wk 1	Wk 2	Wk 3	Wk 4	Wk 5	Wk 6	Wk 7	Wk 8	Wk 9	Wk 10	Wk 11	Wk 12	Wk 13	Wk 14	Wk 15	Wk 16	WK 17	Wk 18	Wk 19	Final
AP	RV	25	22	16	13	18	16	16	16	14	12	15	12	10	9	8	14	14	11	11	
Coaches	RV	RV	23	16	13	19	18	17	17	14	12	14	12	11	10	8	13	12	10	10	14
