= 2007–08 Wright State Raiders men's basketball team =

American college basketball season

2007–08 Wright State Raiders men's basketball
- Conference: Horizon League
- Record: 21–10 (12–6 Horizon)
- Head coach: Brad Brownell (2nd season)
- Associate head coach: Billy Donlon
- Assistant coaches: Mike Winiecki; Victor Ebong
- Home arena: Nutter Center

2007–08 Horizon League men's basketball standings
	Conf.				Overall
Team	W		L	PCT	W		L	PCT
No. 11 Butler †	16	–	2	.889	30	–	4	.882
Cleveland State	12	–	6	.667	21	–	13	.618
Wright State	12	–	6	.667	21	–	10	.677
Valparaiso	9	–	9	.500	22	–	14	.611
UIC	9	–	9	.500	18	–	15	.545
Green Bay	9	–	9	.500	15	–	15	.500
Milwaukee	9	–	9	.500	14	–	16	.467
Loyola Chicago	6	–	12	.333	12	–	19	.387
Youngstown State	5	–	13	.278	9	–	21	.300
Detroit	3	–	15	.167	7	–	23	.233
† Horizon League Tournament winner Rankings from AP Poll

The 2007–08 Wright State Raiders men's basketball team represented Wright State University in the 2007–08 NCAA Division I men's basketball season. The Raiders, led by head coach Brad Brownell, played their home games at the Nutter Center in Dayton, Ohio, as members of the Horizon League.

== Roster ==
2007–08 Wright State Raiders men's basketball team
Players
Coaches

Pos.	#	Name	Height	Weight	Year	Previous school	Hometown
F	2	Scott Wilson	6 ft 6 in (1.98 m)	215 lb (98 kg)	Sr	Cincinnati St CC	Middletown, OH
F	50	Jordan Pleiman	6 ft 8 in (2.03 m)	240 lb (109 kg)	Sr	Ft. Loramie	Fort Loramie, OH
F	33	Gavin Horne	6 ft 8 in (2.03 m)	215 lb (98 kg)	Jr	Santa Fe CC	Waterloo, Ontario
G	34	Will Graham	6 ft 1 in (1.85 m)	175 lb (79 kg)	Jr	Catholic	Lexington, KY
G	4	John David Gardner	6 ft 4 in (1.93 m)	190 lb (86 kg)	So	UNC Wilmington	Homewood, AL
G	21	Todd Brown	6 ft 5 in (1.96 m)	190 lb (86 kg)	So	McKinley	Canton, OH
G	30	Scott Grote	6 ft 6 in (1.98 m)	200 lb (91 kg)	So	Duquesne	Centerville, OH
F	40	Ronnie Thomas	6 ft 8 in (2.03 m)	240 lb (109 kg)	So	Duquesne	Middlebury, IN
G	44	Vaughn Duggins	6 ft 3 in (1.91 m)	180 lb (82 kg)	So	Pendleton	Pendleton, IN
G	3	Troy Tabler	6 ft 3 in (1.91 m)	185 lb (84 kg)	Fr	Moeller	Cincinnati, OH
G	11	N'Gai Evans	6 ft 1 in (1.85 m)	165 lb (75 kg)	Fr	Hoover	North Canton, OH
F	14	Cooper Land	6 ft 8 in (2.03 m)	215 lb (98 kg)	Fr	Marcus	Flower Mound, TX
F	15	Kyle Pressley	6 ft 9 in (2.06 m)	220 lb (100 kg)	Fr	Concordia Lutheran	Fort Wayne, IN

Head coach

- Brad Brownell (DePauw)

Assistant coach(es)

- Billy Donlon (UNC Wilmington)
- Mike Winiecki (Richmond)
- Adrian Townsend (UNC Wilmington)

Legend

- (C) Team captain
- (S) Suspended
- (I) Ineligible
- (W) Walk-on
- Injured
- Current redshirt

== Schedule and results ==
Date time, TV	Rank^{#}	Opponent^{#}	Result	Record	Site city, state
Exhibition
November 19, 2007*		Coastal Carolina	W 71–48	1-0	Nutter Center (3,983); Fairborn, OH
November 28, 2007*		Marshall	W 77–70	2-0	Nutter Center (4,113); Fairborn, OH
December 1, 2007*		at Marist	L 64–79	2–1	McCann Arena (2,273); Poughkeepsie, NY
December 6, 2007		Valparaiso	L 66–71	2–2 (0–1)	Nutter Center (4,189); Fairborn, OH
Dec 8, 2007		No. 18 Butler	W 43-42	3–2 (1–1)	Nutter Center (6,981); Fairborn, OH
Dec 11, 2007*		Bradley	L 65-72	3–3	Nutter Center (3,382); Fairborn, OH
Dec 15, 2007*		Miami Ohio	W 58-57	4–3	Nutter Center (3,813); Fairborn, OH
Dec 18, 2007*		St. Bonaventure	W 54-45	5–3	Nutter Center (2,759); Fairborn, OH
Dec 22, 2007*		at Cal St. Fullerton	W 84-80	6–3	Titan Gym (543); Fullerton, CA
Dec 29, 2007*		vs. Belmont; ESPNU BracketBusters	W 78-74	7-3	McKenzie Arena (4,108); Chattanooga, Tennessee
Dec 30, 2007*		at Chattanooga; ESPNU BracketBusters	W 87-82	8-3	McKenzie Arena (3,652); Chattanooga, TN
Jan 3, 2008		at Milwaukee	L 64-75	8-4 (1–2)	UW–Milwaukee Panther Arena (2,663); Milwaukee, WI
Jan 5, 2008		at Green Bay	L 49-52	8-5 (1–3)	Resch Center (4,011); Ashwaubenon, WI
Jan 10, 2008		Youngstown State	W 66-55	9-5 (2–3)	Nutter Center (4,183); Fairborn, OH
Jan 12, 2008		Cleveland State	L 63-65	9-6 (2–4)	Nutter Center (6,477); Fairborn, OH
Jan 17, 2008		at UIC	W 76-75	10-6 (3–4)	UIC Pavilion (3,437); Chicago, IL
Jan 19, 2008		at Loyola	W 53-52	11-6 (4–4)	Gentile Event Center (2,000); Chicago, IL
Jan 26, 2008		at Detroit Mercy	W 66–57	12-6 (5-4)	Calihan Hall (2,236); Detroit, MI
Jan 31, 2008		Green Bay	W 71-67	13-6 (6–4)	Nutter Center (5,258); Fairborn, OH
Feb 2, 2008		Milwaukee	W 53-51	14-6 (7-4)	Nutter Center (6,700); Fairborn, OH
Feb 4, 2008*		Presbyterian	W 58-42	15-6	Nutter Center (4,168); Fairborn, OH
Feb 7, 2008		at Cleveland State	W 55-49	16-6 (8–4)	Wolstein Center (2,793); Cleveland, OH
Feb 7, 2008		at Youngstown State	W 50-47	17-6 (9-4)	Beeghly Center (4,514); Youngstown, OH
Feb 14, 2008		Loyola	W 55-51	18-6 (10–4)	Nutter Center (4,819); Fairborn, OH
Feb 16, 2008		UIC	W 52-50	19-6 (11–4)	Nutter Center (7,247); Fairborn, OH
Feb 20, 2008		Detroit Mercy	W 59–58	20-6 (12-4)	Nutter Center (6,998); Fairborn, OH
Feb 24, 2008*		at Illinois State	L 46–54	20-7	CEFCU Arena (6,089); Normal, IL
Feb 28, 2008		at No. 14 Butler	L 61-66	20-8 (12–5)	Hinkle Fieldhouse (6,045); Indianapolis
Mar 1, 2008		at Valparaiso	L 73-75	20–9 (12–6)	Athletics–Recreation Center (4,935); Valparaiso, IN
Midwestern Collegiate Tournament
Mar 4, 2008	(3)	(10) Detroit Mercy; First Round	W 60-37	21-9	Nutter Center (3,380); Fairborn, OH
Mar 7, 2008		vs. Valparaiso	L 73-75	21–10	Hinkle Fieldhouse (1,346); Indianapolis
*Non-conference game. ^{#}Rankings from AP Poll. (#) Tournament seedings in parentheses. MW=Midwest.

== Awards and honors ==
Vaughn Duggins	First Team All Horizon League
Brad Brownell	Horizon League Coach of the Year

== Statistics ==
Number	Name	Games	Average	Points	Assists	Rebounds
44	Vaughn Duggins	31	13.8	429	85	91
21	Todd Brown	31	12.7	395	71	132
2	Scottie Wilson	30	9.8	295	20	215
50	Jordan Pleiman	31	8.1	252	7	188
34	Will Graham	31	5.9	184	110	118
3	Troy Tabler	30	5.0	151	27	42
14	Cooper Land	30	3.2	95	11	65
11	N'Gai Evans	19	2.4	46	4	11
4	John David Gardner	11	3.8	42	26	24
40	Ronnie Thomas	25	1.6	41	3	34
33	Gavin Horne	11	1.3	14	4	8
