= 2008 Horizon League men's basketball tournament =

- Classification: Division I
- Season: 2007–08
- Teams: 10
- First round site: campus sites
- Quarterfinals site: Hinkle Fieldhouse; Indianapolis, Indiana
- Semifinals site: Hinkle Fieldhouse; Indianapolis, Indiana
- Finals site: Hinkle Fieldhouse; Indianapolis, Indiana
- Champions: Butler (5th title)
- Winning coach: Brad Stevens (1st title)
- MVP: Mike Green (Butler)

2007–08 Horizon League men's basketball standings
	Conf.				Overall
Team	W		L	PCT	W		L	PCT
No. 11 Butler †	16	–	2	.889	30	–	4	.882
Cleveland State	12	–	6	.667	21	–	13	.618
Wright State	12	–	6	.667	21	–	10	.677
Valparaiso	9	–	9	.500	22	–	14	.611
UIC	9	–	9	.500	18	–	15	.545
Green Bay	9	–	9	.500	15	–	15	.500
Milwaukee	9	–	9	.500	14	–	16	.467
Loyola Chicago	6	–	12	.333	12	–	19	.387
Youngstown State	5	–	13	.278	9	–	21	.300
Detroit	3	–	15	.167	7	–	23	.233
† Horizon League Tournament winner Rankings from AP Poll

The 2008 Horizon League men's basketball tournament was scheduled at the end of the 2007–2008 regular season. The better seed hosted each first round match. Butler hosted the second round and semifinals, because they were the top seed. The final was hosted by the better remaining seed.

== Tiebreakers ==
- The first tiebreaker resolved is the one between seeds 2 and 3.

=== Seeds 2–3 ===
- The first tiebreaker is head-to-head record.
- The second tiebreaker is record against the top seed Butler.
- The third tiebreaker is record against the teams tied for 4th.
  - Cleveland State earns the 2nd seed by virtue of its 5–3 record against UIC, Valparaiso, UW-Green Bay and UW-Milwaukee.
  - Wright State earns the 3rd seed because of its 4–4 record against UIC, Valparaiso, UW-Green Bay and UW-Milwaukee.

=== Seeds 4–7 ===
- The first tiebreaker is record against the tied teams.
  - UIC earns the 4th seed by virtue of a 4–2 record against Valparaiso, UW-Green Bay and UW-Milwaukee.
  - UW-Green Bay earns the 7th seed because of its 2–4 record against UIC, Valparaiso and UW-Milwaukee.
- Since UW-Milwaukee and Valparaiso had identical 3–3 records against the other three teams, the tiebreaker between those two teams is head-to-head record.
- The second tiebreaker is record against the top seed Butler.
- The third tiebreaker is record against the second seed Cleveland State.
  - UW-Milwaukee earns the 5th seed by virtue of its 1–1 record against Cleveland State.
  - Valparaiso earns the 6th seed because of its 0–2 record against Cleveland State.

== Bracket ==
First round Tuesday, March 4
4	UIC	70
9	Youngstown State	59
5	Milwaukee	51
8	Loyola Chicago	57
3	Wright State	60
10	Detroit	37
6	Valparaiso	75
7	Green Bay	67

Second round Friday, March 7
4	UIC	60
8	Loyola Chicago	49
3	Wright State	67
6	Valparaiso	72

Semifinals; Saturday, March 8
1	#14 Butler	66
4	UIC	50
2	Cleveland State	78
6	Valparaiso	73

Championship; Tuesday, March 11
1	#12 Butler	70
2	Cleveland State	55

First round games at campus sites of higher seeds
Second round and semifinals hosted by the top seed. Championship hosted by lower-numbered remaining seed
