= Drew Cannon =

American statistician and sports writer

- Born: April 21, 1990 (age 35); Durham, North Carolina
- Education: Duke University, 2012
- Occupations: Statistician; Sports writer
- Employer: Boston Celtics
- Known for: Applying advanced statistics to college basketball

Drew Cannon (born April 21, 1990) is an American statistician and sports writer who currently works on the Boston Celtics staff.

As a child, Cannon was fascinated by sports statistics and, after reading the work of Bill James, began to design his own statistical projects to analyze sports. At age 15, he got an internship with well-known basketball scout Dave Telep. Over the next seven years, his research helped improve Telep's recruiting, while Telep worked to round out Cannon's personality. Cannon developed writing skills during college and his research was published by Basketball Prospectus, ESPN, and Kenpom.com. He graduated from Duke in 2012, and was hired by Brad Stevens to do statistical analysis for the Butler basketball team. Cannon produced regular reports on how to increase the team's efficiency. The success of his recommendations won over doubters and led to multiple reporters describing Cannon as Butler's "secret weapon".

In July 2013, Stevens was hired by the Boston Celtics and brought Cannon with him.

== Early life ==
As a young child growing up in Raleigh, North Carolina, Drew Cannon was attracted to numbers, in particular sports statistics. At age eight, he read through his father's Bill James baseball books. By thirteen, he was designing his own statistical projects to analyze sports - for example, comparing Negro league baseball players to Major Leaguers from the same time period. Cannon "probably had about 25 [different] projects going on" by age 15, recalled his father Jim Cannon.

Cannon played sports as a child, but was not athletically gifted. He was the sixth man for his junior high team, but did not play for his high school team. Cannon has a younger sister, Maria, and a younger brother, Chris.

At a casual lunch with friends in 2004, Jim Cannon met recruiting specialist Dave Telep. Soon the conversation turned to basketball. Telep had just finished reading Moneyball and was intrigued with the idea of bringing advanced statistics to basketball. "My mind (was) wide open about how we can apply [Moneyball] to basketball", Telep recalled. After lunch, Cannon approached Telep: "There's this kid in my house that I don't know what to do with. Can you help me?" Telep met with Drew Cannon, then a 15-year-old sophomore in high school, and soon offered him an internship, paying $600 for the summer.

== Internship and college ==
Over the next seven years, Telep mentored Cannon. Cannon's analytical strengths were obvious, but he lacked the personality to be successful in the sporting world. His first report was like "straight out of a scientific journal", Telep recalls. Telep worked, teaching Cannon how to "communicating to the common man". He forced Cannon to interact with coaches and players, rather than just crunch numbers behind the scenes. "If he was going to do this, he couldn't do it with a lab coat on," Telep explained. Cannon spent so much time with Telep that his kids thought Cannon lived there. He joined Telep on recruiting trips, crunching numbers while Telep enjoyed the Las Vegas nightlife. "[Cannon] gets lost in his computer more than anyone that I've ever seen," says Telep.

As time went on, Cannon's basketball savvy increased as he learned how to scout talent. Studies conducted for Telep included determining which regions of the country were over or under recruited, analyzing the effect of landing top recruits on college programs, and determining the failure rate of foreign-born recruits. A study he did on what constitutes a good mid-major recruit was featured on the first page of The New York Times' sports section. Coaches began to expect Cannon's presence, asking Telep where he was when Cannon missed a trip.

Cannon graduated from Cardinal Gibbons High School in 2008 and attended Duke for college, majoring in statistics. On the advice of Telep, Cannon took writing classes to increase his ability to communicate. Starting his sophomore year, Cannon sought outside opportunities to publish his writing. By graduation, Cannon had written articles on his statistical research for Basketball Prospectus, ESPN, and Kenpom.com. While classmates did their senior projects on economic models and health care management, Cannon's was on high school basketball recruiting, leading his father to joke "Who are the slipshod parents who led him down this path?" Cannon graduated with a degree in statistics in the spring of 2012.

== Professional career ==
After graduation, Cannon was leaning towards becoming a writer. His parents just hoped Cannon could find a job of any kind. His father remarked that Cannon had earned the right to pursue his passion, joking "if he had to live in the basement for a year, we could feed him. He would’ve had to share the basement with the dog, but so be it." Cannon soon moved to Chicago where he lived with family and considered tending bar on the side as he freelanced for the websites he wrote for during college.

Cannon started his own scouting service analyzing the Nike Elite Youth Basketball League. Butler was among the first schools to subscribe, and soon head coach Brad Stevens was contacting Cannon to discuss potential recruits. Two weeks later, Stevens offered Cannon a job as graduate manager. "I [was] really excited to not have to get a real job," Cannon recalled. "I was a couple weeks from getting a bartending gig in Chicago and writing on the side". His parents were excited with the offer, but also surprised. "Does he realize you are monumentally under qualified for this position?" Jim Cannon told his son. In reality, Cannon was well qualified - Sports Illustrated called him a "perfect match" for Stevens, who is known for his use of statistics to aid his coaching. Although it is not uncommon for NBA teams to employ statisticians, Cannon became the first person hired by a college team solely to perform advanced statistical analysis.

After each game, Cannon produces a ten-page report completely breaking down the game analytically. The report takes between ten and twelve hours to complete. One of his main responsibilities is to determine which lineup combinations work best. Over time, Cannon has developed a series of substitution rules designed to maximize the team's performance. During the offseason, he plans to study what practice drills led to better game play. "He thinks of things like that all the time that are completely out of the box," remarked Stevens.

In his first year at Butler, Cannon made a strong impression. Stevens called Cannon's work on lineup and substitution patterns "very impactful" and said "He's really an invaluable resource." Assistant coach Michael Lewis, a former doubter in the value of statistical analysis, has been persuaded by Cannon's work. When asked what changed his mind, Lewis replied "He hasn't been wrong". After the season, Butler created a new position, "basketball analyst", specifically for Cannon. Stevens said he did not know of any other team to have such a position, but "there is one now."

In July 2013, Stevens left Butler to become the new head coach of the Boston Celtics. One of his first decisions as coach was to hire Cannon, although his role was not immediately defined. Stevens said that's the way he wants it, remarking "I like the idea that it’s not really defined ... I don’t want it to be restraining at all."

Cannon is hesitant to take credit for advancing the statistical movement in basketball, saying "Hopefully I don't screw it up and other teams think it's a good idea still." Others have been less hesitant. Telep jokes that he will surely work for Cannon someday. "You don't put limits on people like him", he explains. Ken Pomeroy sees a bright future for Cannon. "Certainly he's going to be the guy people look at in the next 10 years who want to get into this business." he remarked. According to Pomeroy:

What makes Drew special, and this shouldn't be taken lightly, is that he's good at crunching numbers and he's good at interpreting those numbers in a way that a coach can understand, sensibly and rationally. He knows his role in informing a coach's opinion. For a guy to do that at 22 is pretty outrageous.

Telep, meanwhile, has retired the internship position, believing he would never find talent comparable to Cannon's.
