= Todd Lickliter =

American basketball player-coach

Biographical details
- Born: April 17, 1955 (age 71); Indianapolis, Indiana, U.S.

Playing career
- 1975–1976: UNC Wilmington
- 1976–1977: Central Florida CC
- 1977–1979: Butler
- Position: Guard

Coaching career (HC unless noted)
- 1979–1987: Park Tudor School
- 1987–1988: Danville Community HS
- 1988–1989: Butler (assistant)
- 1989–1992: Danville Community HS
- 1997–1999: Eastern Michigan (assistant)
- 1999–2001: Butler (assistant)
- 2001–2007: Butler
- 2007–2010: Iowa
- 2011–2012: Miami (OH) (assistant)
- 2012–2015: Marian (IN)
- 2018–2019: Evansville (assistant)
- 2020–2022: Evansville

Administrative career (AD unless noted)
- 2015–2018: Boston Celtics (scout)

Head coaching record
- Overall: 233–208 (.528)
- Tournaments: 4–2 (NCAA Division I); 2–2 (NIT)

Accomplishments and honors

Championships
- 3 Horizon League regular season (2002, 2003, 2007)

Awards
- NABC Coach of the Year (2007); 2× Horizon League Coach of the Year (2006, 2007)

Todd Arlan Lickliter (born April 17, 1955) is the former head coach of the Evansville Purple Aces men's basketball team of the Missouri Valley Conference (MVC). He was previously the head coach of Marian University, the University of Iowa, and Butler University men's basketball teams. He spent the 2011–12 season as an assistant coach at Miami (Ohio).

== Early years ==
Lickliter was a starting point guard at North Central High School in Indianapolis, where he played for his father, Arlan. He helped North Central to a sectional title in Hinkle Fieldhouse in 1973, and he played his final high school game in the Fieldhouse in the 1974 sectional semifinals. Following his high school graduation, he enrolled at the University of North Carolina at Wilmington (UNCW) but wound up transferring to Central Florida Community College. He played one season at Central Florida, earning an associate degree in 1977, and then transferred to Butler, where he played his final two collegiate seasons, 1977–79. He earned a B.S. degree in secondary education from Butler in 1979.

== Early coaching career ==
Lickliter began his collegiate coaching career at Butler University in 1988–89 under his former college coach, Joe Sexson. He left the Bulldogs after a year to accept a head coaching job at Danville High School in Danville, Indiana, where he remained for three seasons. He returned to the collegiate ranks in 1996 as an administrative assistant on Barry Collier's staff. Lickliter accepted an assistant coaching position at Eastern Michigan in 1997 and remained on the Eagles' staff for two seasons, before returning to Butler in 1999. In six NCAA Division I seasons, he contributed to teams that won three conference regular season championships, four conference tournament titles, made four NCAA tournament appearances, and compiled a 106–73 record.

Lickliter played a prominent role in refining Butler's basketball system during his stint as assistant coach to Collier and Thad Matta. During his three seasons on the staff of the two former head coaches, the Bulldogs had three 20-win seasons, won three conference regular season titles, three league tournament crowns and three trips to the NCAA Tournament. In his final two seasons as a Butler assistant coach, the Bulldogs compiled a 47–18 record, including "Top 25" wins over #10 Wisconsin and #23 Wake Forest. The win over the Demon Deacons in the 2001 NCAA Men's Basketball Championship was Butler's first NCAA tournament win in 39 years.

== Collegiate head coaching career ==
=== Butler Bulldogs ===
In May 2001 Lickliter was named Butler University's 20th men's head basketball coach, replacing Thad Matta, who accepted the same position at Xavier University. During his first season, Lickliter led the Bulldogs to a then-school record 26 victories and third consecutive Horizon League regular season championship. They also cracked the Associated Press Top 25 rankings for the first time in 53 years. The following year the Bulldogs surpassed their previous season's win total, finishing 27–6. Lickliter's 53 wins during the first two years of his head coaching career rank third best in Division I history, behind Bill Guthridge (58 wins) of North Carolina and Everett Case (55 wins) of North Carolina State. During his six years as head coach, he owned the top three single-season win totals in Butler basketball history and led the Bulldogs to the postseason four times, including two appearances in the NCAA Sweet 16. In April 2007, the National Association of Basketball Coaches named Lickliter the National Coach of the Year. CollegeHoops.net also named Lickliter the High-Major Coach of the Year.

=== Iowa Hawkeyes ===
Lickliter was introduced as the head coach at the University of Iowa on April 3, 2007, replacing Steve Alford. Iowa and Lickliter agreed to a 7-year deal at a salary of $1.2 million per year. At the end of his 3rd year at Iowa, Lickliter was fired for poor performance. His record with the Hawkeyes was 38–58.

=== Marian Knights ===
Lickliter returned to his hometown of Indianapolis, accepting the head coaching job at Marian University on June 6, 2012.

In his second season, Lickliter led the Knights to their most conference wins in school history (12). The Knights ended their season ranked #1 in NAIA Division II in Scoring Defense per Game (57.958), #1 in NAIA Division II in Turnover Margin (6.292), and #4 in NAIA Division II in Assist/Turnover Ratio (1.558).

=== Evansville Purple Aces ===
After spending six seasons out of NCAA Division I college basketball, Lickliter was hired by first-year head coach Walter McCarty to be an assistant for the Evansville Purple Aces men's basketball team in the Missouri Valley Conference. Lickliter's former assistant, Matthew Graves, was also hired to be part of McCarty's staff. After McCarty was fired midway through his second season for sexual harassment and Title IX violations, Lickliter was hired as head coach on January 21, 2020. On May 5, 2022, Lickliter was fired by Evansville after compiling a 15–53 record.

== Head coaching record ==
Record table
Season	Team	Overall	Conference	Standing	Postseason
Butler Bulldogs (Horizon League) (2001–2007)
2001–02	Butler	26–6	12–4	1st	NIT second round
2002–03	Butler	27–6	14–2	1st	NCAA Division I Sweet 16
2003–04	Butler	16–14	8–8	6th	
2004–05	Butler	13–15	7–9	7th	
2005–06	Butler	20–13	11–5	2nd	NIT second round
2006–07	Butler	29–7	13–3	T–1st	NCAA Division I Sweet 16
Butler:		131–61 (.682)	65–31 (.677)		
Iowa Hawkeyes (Big Ten Conference) (2007–2010)
2007–08	Iowa	13–19	6–12	8th	
2008–09	Iowa	15–17	5–13	10th	
2009–10	Iowa	10–22	4–14	T–9th	
Iowa:		38–58 (.396)	15–39 (.278)		
Marian Knights (Crossroads League) (2012–2015)
2012–13	Marian	17–13	8–10	7th	
2013–14	Marian	16–8	12–6	T–4th	
2014–15	Marian	16–15	7–11	7th	
Marian:		49–36 (.576)	27–27 (.500)		
Evansville Purple Aces (Missouri Valley Conference) (2020–2022)
2019–20	Evansville	0–13	0–12	10th	
2020–21	Evansville	9–15	7–11	T–5th	
2021–22	Evansville	6–24	2–16	10th	
Evansville:		15–53 (.221)	9–39 (.188)		
Total:		233–208 (.528)			
National champion Postseason invitational champion Conference regular season champion Conference regular season and conference tournament champion Division regular season champion Division regular season and conference tournament champion Conference tournament champion

== Family ==
Lickliter and his wife, Joez, have three sons, Ry, Garrett and John, and three daughters-in-law, Magdalena, Molly, and Leah. All three of Lickliter's sons graduated from Marian University: Ry in 2006, Garrett in 2007, and John in 2012.
