= 2007–08 Cleveland State Vikings men's basketball team =

American college basketball season

2007–08 Cleveland State Vikings men's basketball

NIT 1st Round vs. Dayton, L, 57–66
- Conference: Horizon League
- Record: 21–13 (12–6 Horizon League)
- Head coach: Gary Waters
- Assistant coaches: Jayson Gee; Larry DeSimpelare; Jermaine Kimbrough
- Home arena: Wolstein Center

2007–08 Horizon League men's basketball standings
	Conf.				Overall
Team	W		L	PCT	W		L	PCT
No. 11 Butler †	16	–	2	.889	30	–	4	.882
Cleveland State	12	–	6	.667	21	–	13	.618
Wright State	12	–	6	.667	21	–	10	.677
Valparaiso	9	–	9	.500	22	–	14	.611
UIC	9	–	9	.500	18	–	15	.545
Green Bay	9	–	9	.500	15	–	15	.500
Milwaukee	9	–	9	.500	14	–	16	.467
Loyola Chicago	6	–	12	.333	12	–	19	.387
Youngstown State	5	–	13	.278	9	–	21	.300
Detroit	3	–	15	.167	7	–	23	.233
† Horizon League Tournament winner Rankings from AP Poll

The 2007–08 Cleveland State Vikings men's basketball team represented Cleveland State University in the 2007-08 NCAA Division I men's basketball season. The team was led by second-year head coach Gary Waters. In 2006–07, the Vikings finished 10–21 (3–13 in the Horizon League). Cleveland State had their first winning season since the 2000–2001 season when they finished 19–13 overall and 9–5 in conference play. It was the 77th season of Cleveland State basketball.

== Preseason ==
The preseason Horizon League Coaches' Poll picked the Vikings to finish ninth. The Vikings bring in ten newcomers to this year's roster. J'Nathan Bullock was named to the preseason all-Horizon League 2nd team. Also for the first time since the 1986–1987 season the Vikings are guaranteed to play at least 32 games. At least 17 of those games will be on the road.

== Regular season ==
On January 5, 2008, Cleveland State matched their win totals from last season (10–21 overall, 3–13 HL), and remain in first place in the Horizon League through 15 games for the first time since the 1999–2000 season. They are the last undefeated team in Horizon League play at 4–0. On January 12, 2008, Cleveland State won its 5th game in conference play. That is its best start in conference play since the 1992–93 season when they won their first 14 conference games. The Vikings were 1–26 in games against ranked opponents, with their only win coming on March 14, 1986, against No. 16 Indiana in the NCAA tournament under coach Kevin Mackey until their 56–52 win over No. 12 Butler on January 17, 2008. The 5,352 fans that attended the game marked the largest crowd in the Wolstein Center since the curtain was added four years ago on the west side to trim the capacity of the building to approximately 8,500. The last time CSU had a larger crowd in the Wolstein Center came on November 29, 2003, when 11,534 saw the Vikings drop an 82–76 decision to No. 9 North Carolina (No. 10 ESPN/USA Today; No. 9 AP). On January 21, 2008, Cleveland State received their first point in the AP Top 25 poll for the season, that had them T-43. The lone point came from Keith Sargeant of the Home News Tribune. On March 1, 2008, Cleveland State clinched the 2nd seed in the Horizon League tournament with a win over Youngstown State and a Wright State loss. With the 2nd seed they only need to win two games to make the NCAA Tournament. They will host the championship game with a win and a Butler loss in the tournament. Also with the win Cleveland State reached the 20-win mark for only the six time in Cleveland State history. On March 8, 2008, Cleveland State reached their first Horizon League championship game ever, and their first conference championship game appearance since 1987.

== Schedule ==
Horizon League Standing: 2nd
Date	Opponent*	Rank*	Location	Time^{#}	Result	Overall	Conference
**Exhibition Game**
November 6, 2007	Lake Erie		Cleveland, OH	7:30 p.m.	W 67–46	1–0	
**Regular Season Games**
November 9, 2007	South Florida		Tampa, FL	7:00 p.m.	W 73–70	1–0	
November 13, 2007	George Mason		Fairfax, VA	7:00 p.m.	L 47–56	1–1	
November 16, 2007	Georgia Southern		Daytona Beach, FL	12:00 p.m.	L 70–72	1–2	
November 17, 2007	Florida State		Daytona Beach, FL	6:00 p.m.	W 69–66	2–2	
November 18, 2007	Florida Atlantic		Daytona Beach, FL	12:00 p.m.	W 76–66	3–2	
November 24, 2007	John Carroll		Cleveland, OH	3:00 p.m.	W 67–57	4–2	
November 28, 2007	California State Northridge		Cleveland, OH	7:00 p.m.	L 68–78	4–3	
December 1, 2007	Geneva College		Cleveland, OH	7:00 p.m.	W 107–51	5–3	
December 4, 2007	Chicago State		Chicago, IL	8:00 p.m.	W 76–71	6–3	
December 8, 2007	**Youngstown State**		Cleveland, OH	5:00 p.m.	W 77–54	7–3	1–0
December 18, 2007	Ohio State		Cleveland, OH	7:00 p.m.	L 63–80	7–4	1–0
December 22, 2007	Central Michigan		Cleveland, OH	1:00 p.m.	W 86–70	8–4	1–0
December 29, 2007	Kent State		Kent, OH	5:00 p.m.	L 69–84	8–5	1–0
January 3, 2008	**Loyola Chicago**		Cleveland, OH	7:30 p.m.	W 63–55	9–5	2–0
January 5, 2008	**Illinois Chicago**		Cleveland, OH	7:30 p.m.	W 68–51	10–5	3–0
January 10, 2008	**Detroit Mercy**		Detroit, MI	7:05 p.m.	W 74–64	11–5	4–0
January 12, 2008	**Wright State**		Fairborn, OH	7:00 p.m.	W 65–63	12–5	5–0
January 17, 2008	#12 **Butler**		Cleveland, OH	7:30 p.m.	W 56–52	13–5	6–0
January 19, 2008	**Valparaiso**		Cleveland, OH	7:30 p.m.	W 69–63	14–5	7–0
January 24, 2008	**UW–Green Bay**		Green Bay, WI	8:05 p.m.	L 50–59	14–6	7–1
January 26, 2008	**UW–Milwaukee**		Milwaukee, WI	8:00 p.m.	L 71–79	14–7	7–2
January 31, 2008	**Illinois Chicago**		Chicago, IL	8:00 p.m.	L 68–74	14–8	7–3
February 2, 2008	**Loyola Chicago**		Chicago, IL	8:00 p.m.	L 53–65	14–9	7–4
February 7, 2008	**Wright State**		Cleveland, OH	7:30 p.m.	L 49–55	14–10	7–5
February 9, 2008	**Detroit Mercy**		Cleveland, OH	5:30 p.m.	W 60–56	15–10	8–5
February 11, 2008	**UW–Green Bay**		Cleveland, OH	7:00 p.m.	W 81–64	16–10	9–5
February 14, 2008	**Valparaiso**		Valparaiso, IN	8:05 p.m.	W 71–58	17–10	10–5
February 16, 2008	#9 **Butler**		Indianapolis, IN	3:00 p.m.	L 46–51	17–11	10–6
February 20, 2008	**UW–Milwaukee**		Cleveland, OH	7:00 p.m.	W 74–64	18–11	11–6
February 23, 2008	Marist		Cleveland, OH	6:30 p.m.	W 59–44	19–11	11–6
March 1, 2008	**Youngstown State**		Youngstown, OH	7:05 p.m.	W 65–58	20–11	12–6
**Horizon League tournament**
March 8, 2008	**Valparaiso**		Indianapolis, IN	4:30 p.m.	W 78–73	21–11	12–6
March 11, 2008	#12 **Butler**		Indianapolis, IN	9:00 p.m.	L 55–70	21–12	12–6
**National Invitation Tournament**
March 19, 2008	Dayton		Dayton, OH	7:00 p.m.	L 57–66	21–13	12–6
*Rank according to AP Top 25 Poll. ^{#}All times are in EST. Conference games in **BOLD**.
