= A. J. Graves =

American basketball player

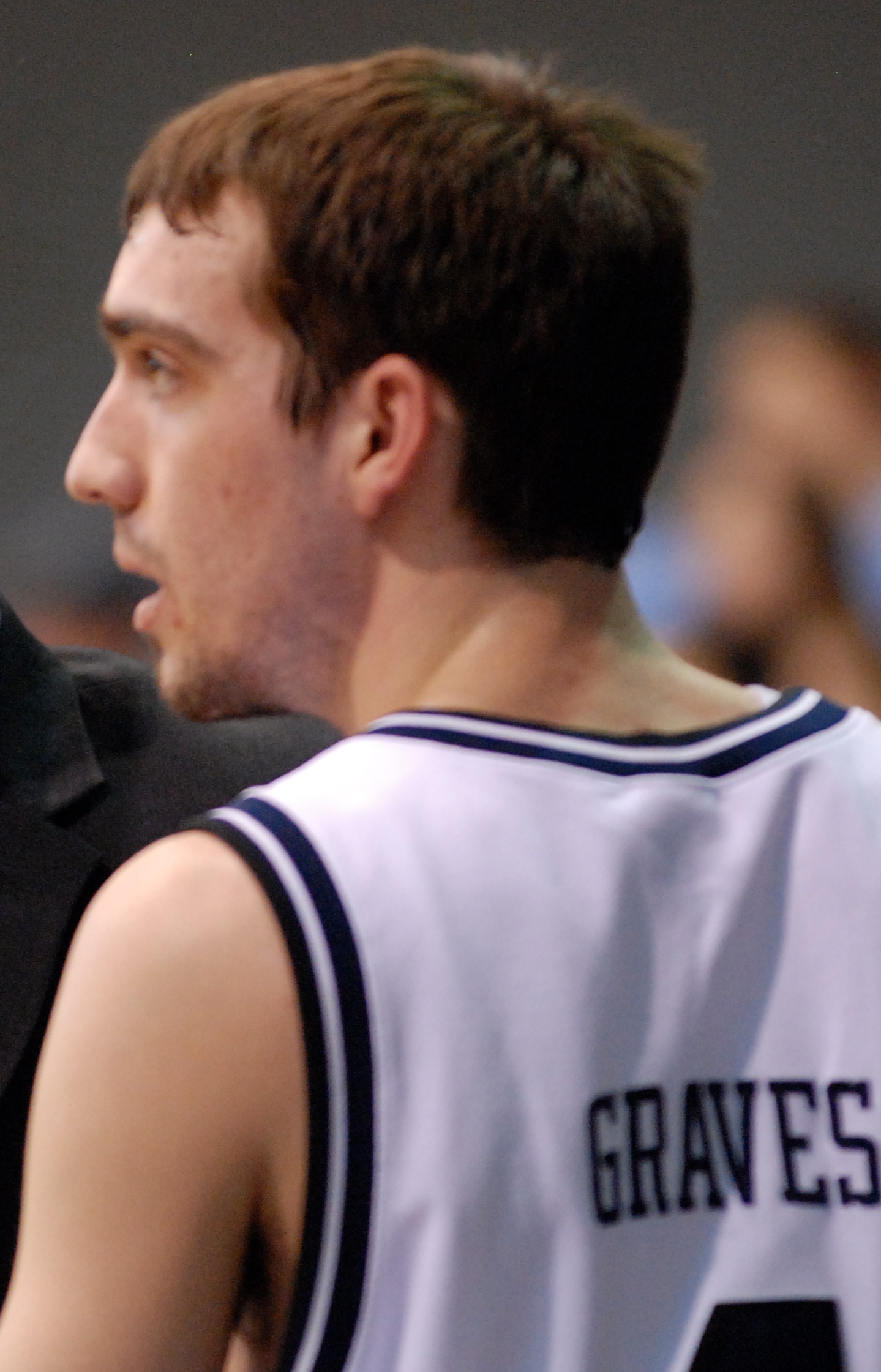
- Graves with Butler in 2008

Personal information
- Born: August 15, 1985 (age 41) Switz City, Indiana, U.S.
- Listed height: 6 ft 1 in (1.85 m)

Career information
- High school: White River Valley (Switz City, Indiana)
- College: Butler (2004–2008)
- NBA draft: 2008: undrafted
- Playing career: 2009–2010
- Position: Shooting guard

Career history
- 2009–2010: PBG Basket Poznań

Adam James Graves (born August 15, 1985) is an American basketball player who played college basketball with the Butler University Bulldogs. He played one year professionally with PBG Basket Poznań in the Polish Basketball League.

== College statistics ==
Year	Team	GP	GS	MPG	FG%	3P%	FT%	RPG	APG	SPG	BPG	PPG
2004–05	Butler	28	23	31.6	.414	.341	.919	2.2	2.8	1.3	0.1	11.1
2005–06	Butler	33	33	32.4	.402	.374	.819	2.3	2.4	1.3	0.0	13.4
2006–07	Butler	35	34	35.6	.375	.354	.948	2.3	2.4	1.5	0.1	16.9
2007–08	Butler	34	34	35.2	.375	.338	.889	2.9	2.2	1.6	0.1	13.6
Career		130	124	33.8	.432	.351	.900	2.4	2.4	1.4	0.1	13.9
