= The Butler Way =

The Butler Way is a term used since the 2006–2007 men's NCAA college basketball season by broadcasters and sportswriters nationwide to describe the governing philosophy of the Butler Bulldogs, one of the most successful former mid-major programs. The Butler Way demands commitment, denies selfishness and accepts reality, yet seeks constant improvement while promoting the good of the team above self.

== History of the term ==
The Butler Way was originally forged by Butler University's legendary coach and administrator Tony Hinkle.

== The five principles ==
The Butler Way has become closely associated with the five principles of Butler Basketball. The five principles as posted in the Men's Basketball locker-room are as follows:

1. Humility - know who we are, strengths and weaknesses
2. Passion - do not be lukewarm, commit to excellence
3. Unity - do not divide our house, team first
4. Servanthood - make teammates better, lead by giving
5. Thankfulness - learn from every circumstance

== See also ==
- Team work
- Seven Point Creed
