= Athletics–Recreation Center =

Arena in Valparaiso, Indiana, US

Athletics-Recreation Center
- ARC
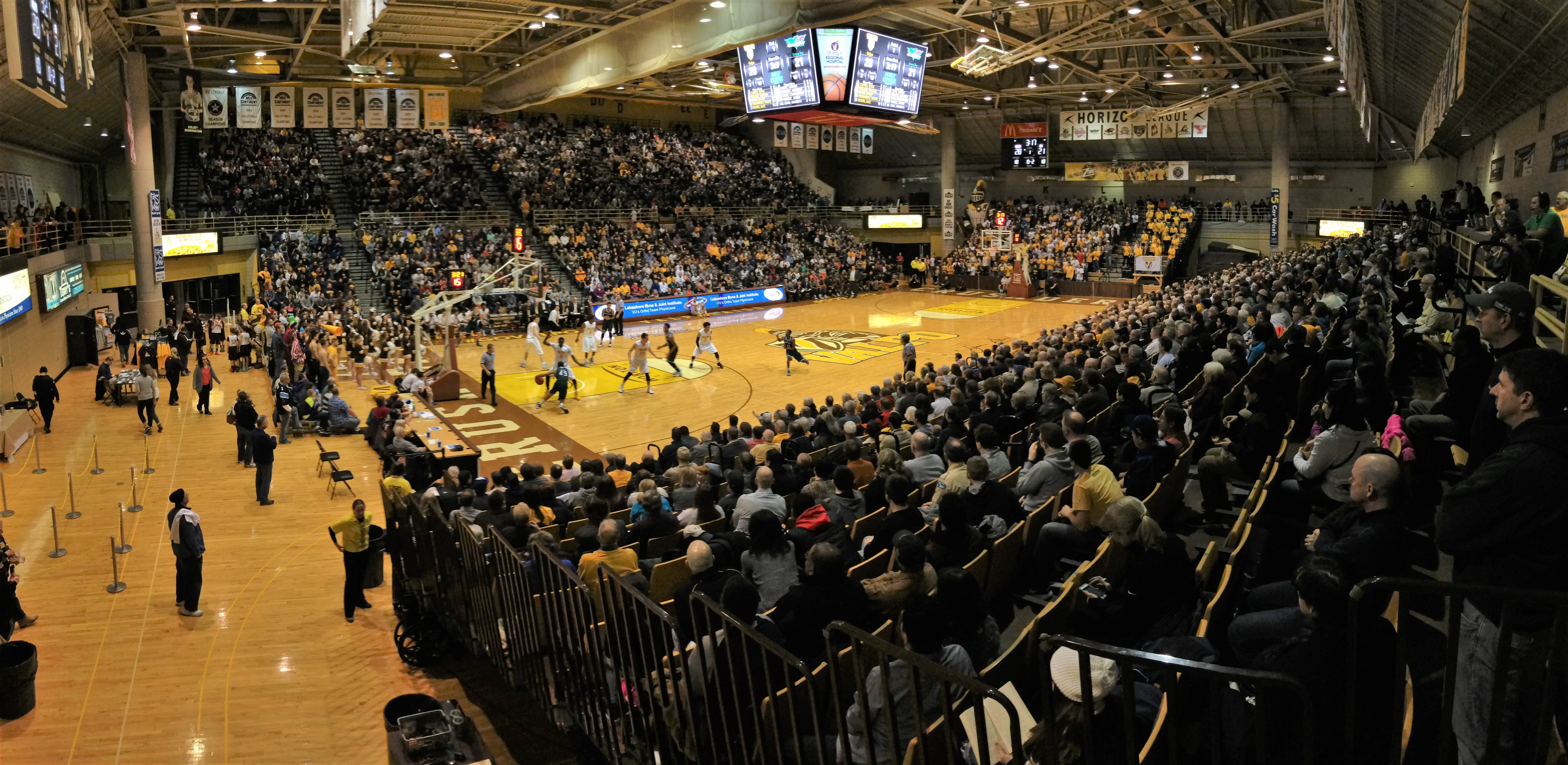
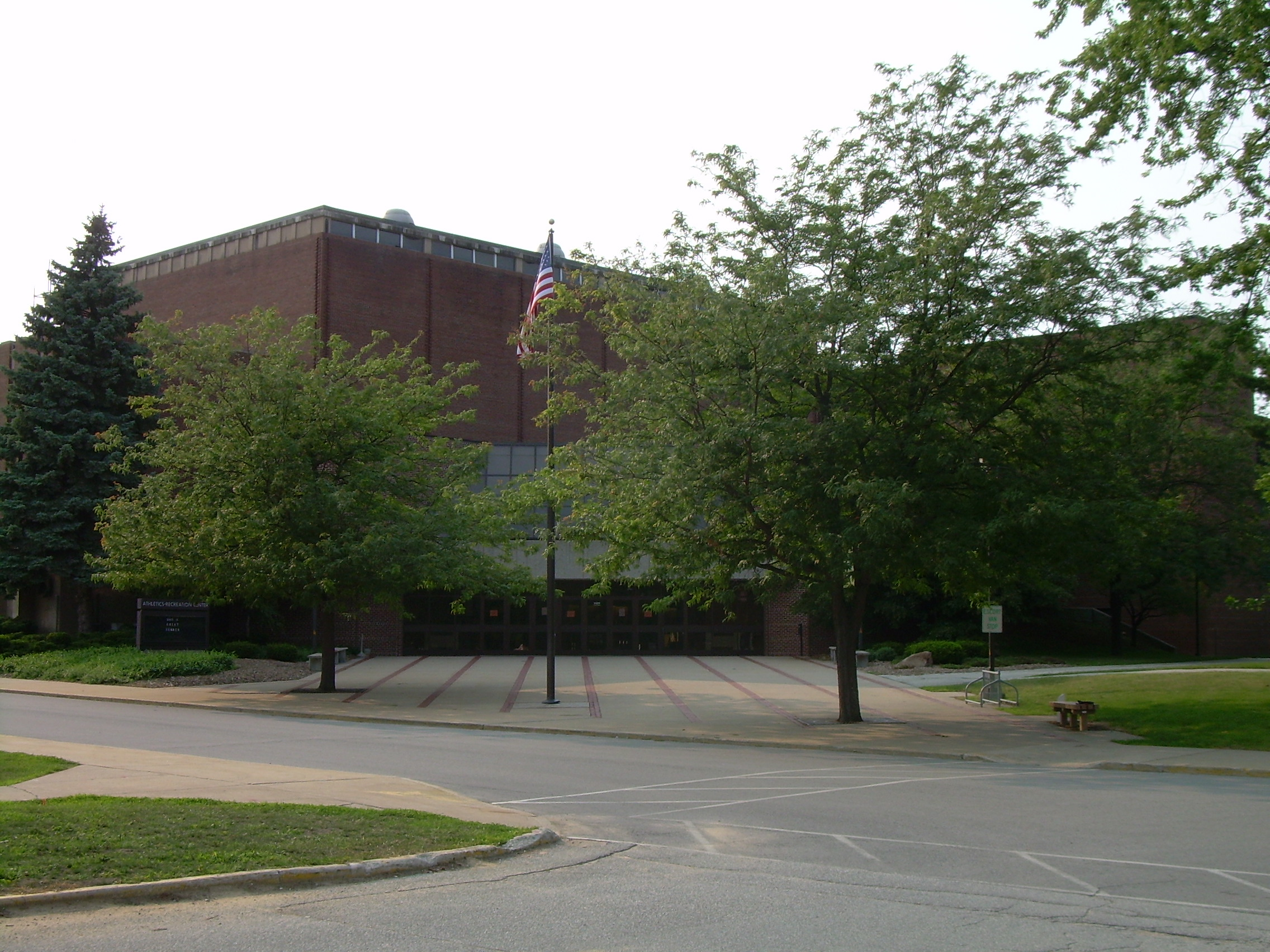
- Homer Drew Court and ARC Interior in 2016, ARC exterior in 2006

- Location in the United States
- Location: 1009 Union Street; Valparaiso, IN 46383
- Coordinates: 41°27′51″N 87°02′54″W
- Owner: Valparaiso University
- Operator: Valparaiso University
- Capacity: 5,000 (basketball)
- Record attendance: 5,444

Construction
- Groundbreaking: April 23, 1983
- Opened: November 27, 1984
- Cost: $7.25 million ($22.5 million in 2025 dollars)
- Architects: Daverman Associates, Inc.

Tenants
- Valparaiso Beacons (NCAA); Men's basketball (1984–present); Women's basketball (1984–present); Women's volleyball (1984–present)

The Athletics–Recreation Center (ARC) is a 5,000-seat multi-purpose arena on the campus of Valparaiso University in Valparaiso, Indiana, United States. It serves as the home court for Valparaiso Beacons men's and women's basketball teams as well as the volleyball team. It opened in 1984 as an addition to Hilltop Gym, the oldest parts of which date to 1939.

== History ==
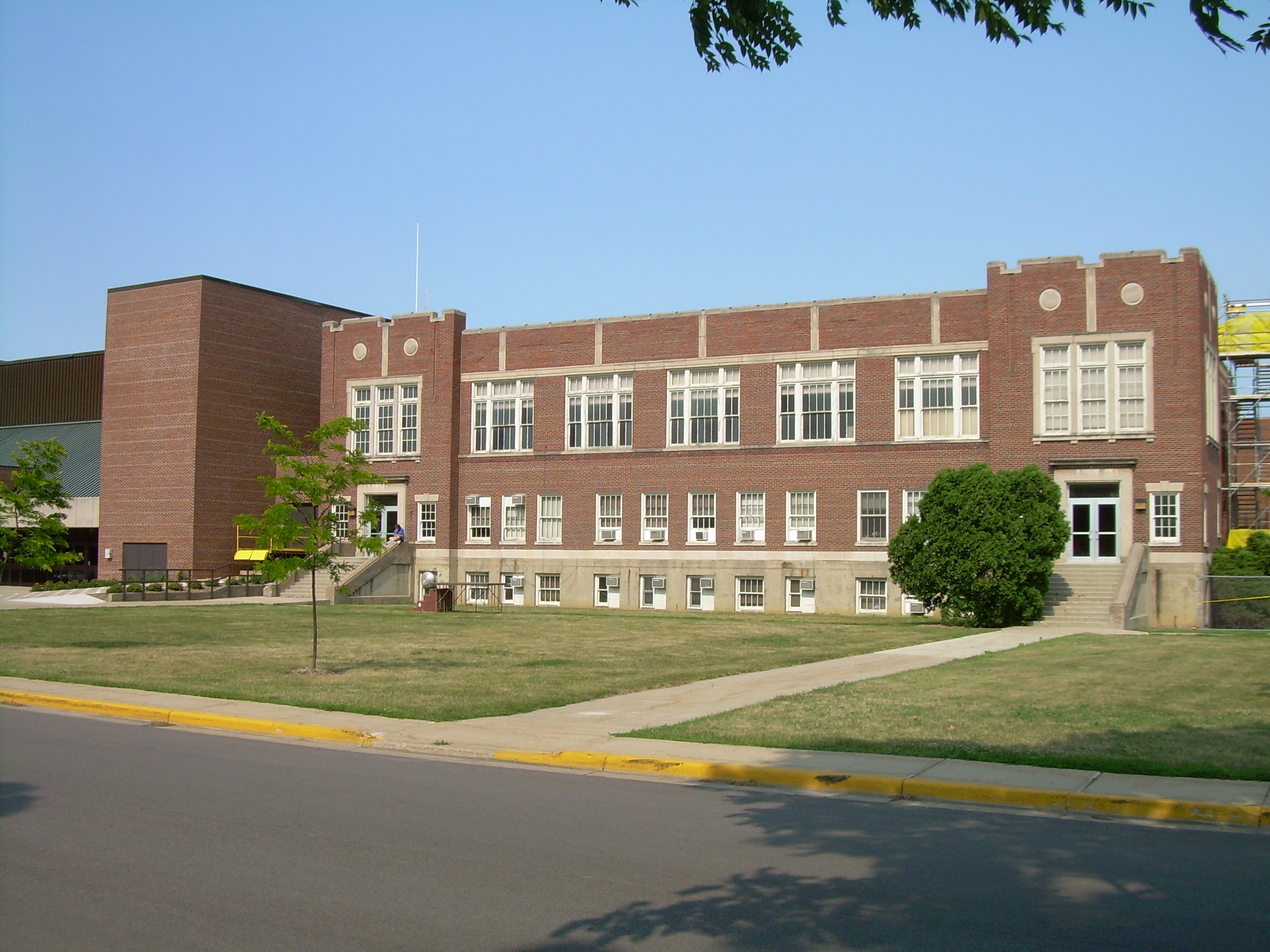
Hilltop Gym entrance, now part of the ARC

Prior to construction of the ARC, the Valpo basketball and volleyball teams competed at Hilltop Gymnasium, which opened in 1939 and is among the first facilities built at the university after it was purchased by the Lutherans. Hilltop had previously been expanded in 1962 to include more seating for basketball and a swimming pool on the first floor. Hilltop Gym was home for Valpo basketball when it competed in the NCAA's former College Division, for smaller schools. Notable individuals to appear in Hilltop include Larry Bird during his collegiate career at Indiana State, and Robert F. Kennedy, who gave a speech in the gym during his presidential campaign. It is now used as a practice facility for the men's and women's basketball teams following a 2005 renovation that included new flooring, lighting, windows and numerous banners celebrating Valpo's basketball tradition.

Beginning in the late 1970s it was decided that Valpo needed to expand its basketball facilities again, and in 1984, the $7.25 million expansion on the north side of Hilltop Gym, named the Athletics and Recreation Center, was completed. The ARC added 84,000 square feet (7,800 m^{2}) to the existing gym for a total of 142,000 square feet (13,200 m^{2}).

The men's basketball team played their first game there on November 27, 1984, against Western Michigan University and their dedication game there on December 9, 1984, against the Notre Dame Fighting Irish. The greatest upset in the ARC occurred four years later against this same team, when Valpo defeated the 19th ranked Fighting Irish in front of 4,913 fans. The ARC hosted the finals of the 1995 Mid-Continent Conference men's basketball tournament and the 2012, 2013, and 2015 Horizon League men's basketball tournament finals.

The largest crowd in arena history was 5,444 fans for the 2016 NIT Quarterfinal against St. Mary Gaels on March 22, 2016. The total eclipsed the previous record of 5,432 in attendance for the February 5, 2008, meeting against the 10th-ranked Butler Bulldogs on February 5, 2008.

== Facility ==
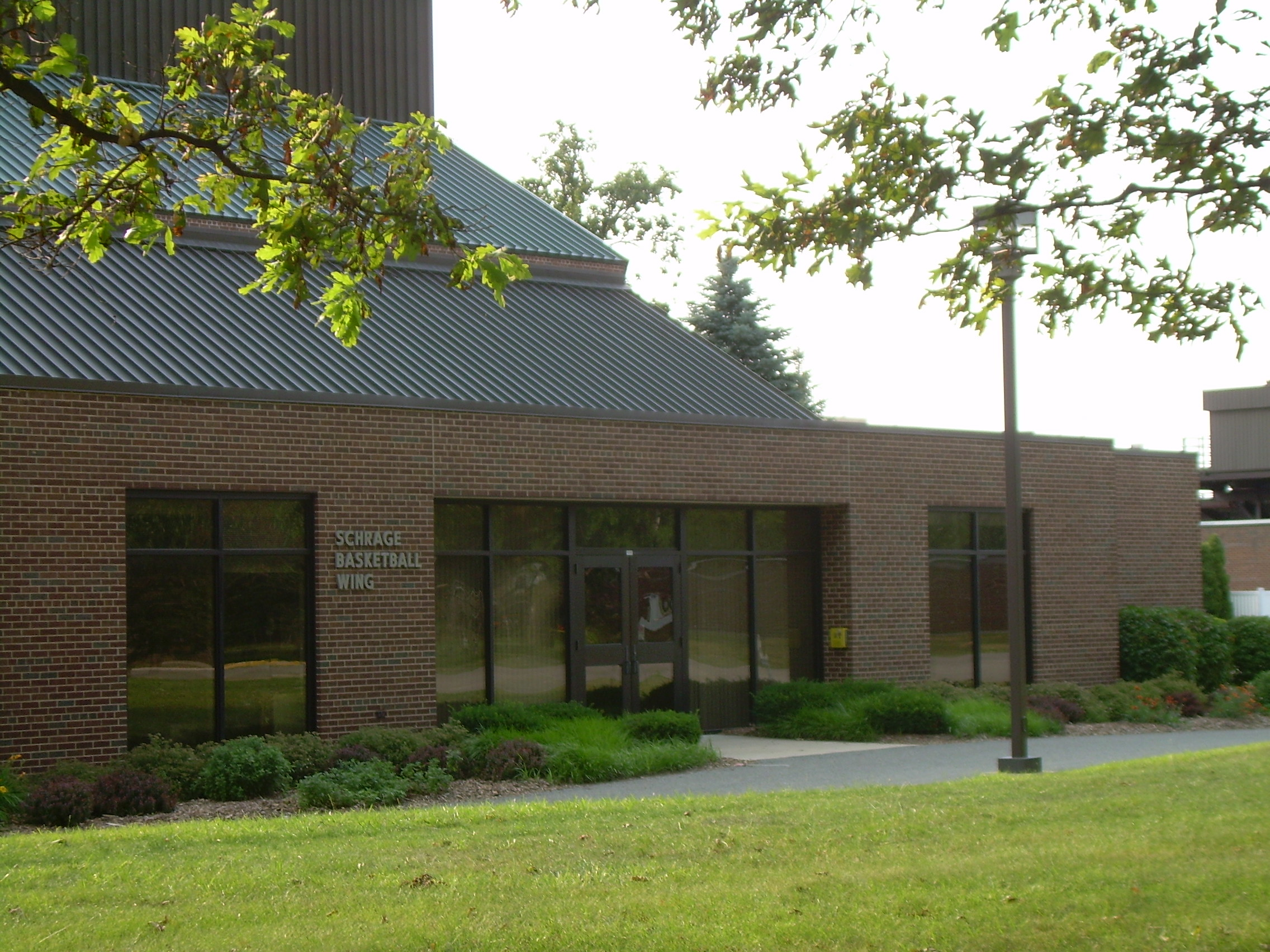
The Schrage Basketball Wing, built in 1999

The main gym is oriented with sidelines on the north and south side of the building and baselines on the east and west. Chairback seating is located along the north sideline. The south sideline includes the press row, team benches, and bleacher seating, and a balcony section. The student section is located behind the west baseline, while the pep band sits in a small temporary bleacher section behind the open east baseline. Fans can access all seating areas from a central concourse that rings the court, which also includes portable concession stands. An additional concession area is located on the floor level behind the east baseline. The listed seating capacity is 5,000 people and can be increased to approximately 6,000 by adding additional seating to the east side. The building architects, Barton-Malow Company, also left the north side of the building amenable to future expansion of up to 10,000 seats total by adding a second balcony section.

There have been several renovations and upgrades in and around the facility since it opened. In 1999 the Schrage Basketball Wing was completed and dedicated, added to the east side of the main arena. The Schrage Wing includes offices for the men's and women's basketball coaches, a computer lab, video room, and team lounges. In 2006 the weight lifting facilities were rearranged with athletes now having access to the Mosak Performance Center, a refurbished room in the building with new customized weight lifting equipment. Further improvements to the facility, such as seating expansion and locker room updates, were discussed in 2006 as the university prepared to begin membership in the Horizon League, but none are in the works for the near future.

== See also ==
- List of NCAA Division I basketball arenas
