= 2010 NCAA Division I men's basketball championship game =

American college basketball final

2010 NCAA Tournament Championship Game
National championship game
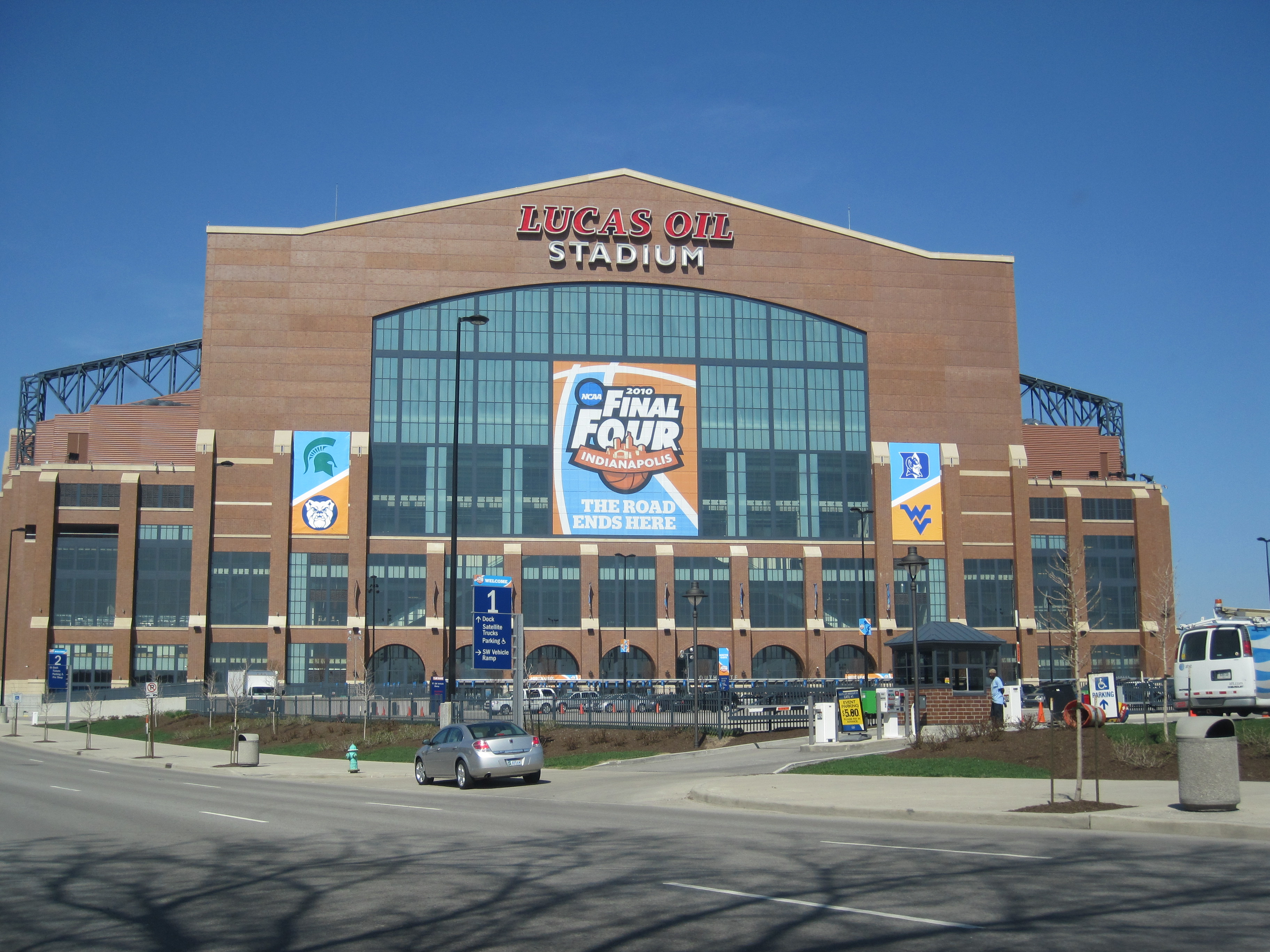
Butler Bulldogs	Duke Blue Devils
Horizon	ACC
(33–4)	(34–5)
59	61
Head coach: Brad Stevens	Head coach: Mike Krzyzewski
- AP: 11
- Coaches: 8
- AP: 3
- Coaches: 3
	1st half	2nd half	Total
Butler Bulldogs	32	27	59
Duke Blue Devils	33	28	61
- Date: April 5, 2010
- Venue: Lucas Oil Stadium, Indianapolis, Indiana
- MVP: Kyle Singler, Duke
- Favorite: Duke by 5
- Referees: John Cahill, Tom Eades, Ted Valentine
- Attendance: 70,930

United States TV coverage
- Network: CBS
- Announcers: Jim Nantz (play-by-play); Clark Kellogg (color); Tracy Wolfson (sideline)
- Nielsen Ratings: 14.2

The 2010 NCAA Division I men's basketball championship game was the finals of the 2010 NCAA Division I men's basketball tournament and determined the National Champion for the 2009-10 NCAA Division I men's basketball season. The game was played on April 5, 2010, at Lucas Oil Stadium in Indianapolis, Indiana, and featured the South Regional Champion, #1 seeded Duke, and the West Regional Champion, #5 seeded Butler.

This was the fifth national championship game to be played between two private universities, and the first since the 1985 national title game between Georgetown and Villanova, won by Villanova, 66–64. The other three besides 1985 and 2010 were in 1942, 1954, and 1955.

== Participants ==
=== Butler Bulldogs ===
Butler entered the tournament as the #5 seed in the West Regional. In the 1st round, Shelvin Mack made seven three-pointers to lead Butler to a 77–59 victory over UTEP. In the 2nd round, Butler used late free throws from Ronald Nored and Matt Howard to beat Murray State 54–52 and advance to the Sweet 16. In the Sweet 16, Butler upset top-seeded Syracuse with a 63–59 win to advance to the West Regional Final, their 1st regional final appearance in team history. In the Elite Eight, Butler would upset Kansas State beating them 63–56 to advance to the Final Four, their 1st appearance in team history. In the Final Four, Butler beat Michigan State with a 52–50 win to advance to their 1st ever national championship game.

=== Duke Blue Devils ===
Duke entered the tournament as the #1 seed in the South Regional. In the 1st round, Duke beat Arkansas-Pine Bluff 73–44. In the 2nd round of the 2010 NCAA Tournament, Duke beat California 68–53. In the Sweet 16, Kyle Singler had 24 points and Jon Scheyer had 18 points to beat Purdue 70–57. In the Elite Eight, Nolan Smith scored 29 points to lead Duke to a 78–71 victory over Baylor to advance to the Final Four. In the 2010 Final Four, Duke beat West Virginia 78–57 to advance to the national championship game, their first since 2001.

== Starting lineups ==
Butler	Position		Duke
Shelvin Mack	G		Nolan Smith
Ronald Nored	G		Jon Scheyer
Willie Veasley	G/F	F	Kyle Singler
Gordon Hayward	G/F	F	Lance Thomas
Matt Howard	F	C	Brian Zoubek

== Game summary ==
CBS

April 5, 2010
9:21 pm

Box score

#W5 Butler Bulldogs 59, #S1 Duke Blue Devils 61
Scoring by half: 32–33, 27–28
Pts: Gordon Hayward, Shelvin Mack 12; Rebs: Gordon Hayward 8 Asts: Willie Veasley 3 Steals: Shelvin Mack 2	Pts: Kyle Singler 19; Rebs: Brian Zoubek 10; Asts: Jon Scheyer 5 Steals: Lance Thomas 2 Blocks: Kyle Singler, Brian Zoubek, Jon Scheyer 2 each

Lucas Oil Stadium, Indianapolis, Indiana
Attendance: 70,930
Referees: John Cahill, Tom Eades, Ted Valentine

=== 1st Half ===
Nolan Smith got Duke off to a hot start scoring four points in the 1st two and a half minutes to give Duke an early 6–1 lead. Shelvin Mack got Butler back into the game making two three-pointers in the next 3 minutes to give Butler a 12–11 lead. Shelvin Mack kept Butler going as Butler would have a 20–18 lead at the under-8 TV Timeout. Then, Jon Scheyer would score four points in the next three minutes leading Duke to an 8–0 run giving them a 26–20 lead and Butler would call a 30-second timeout. During the next 70 seconds, Avery Jukes would score five points leading Butler to a 7–0 run which would result in a 27–26 Butler lead. While Jukes scored five points in the final two and a half minutes of the 1st half, Jon Scheyer scored four in that same time frame and Duke would lead 33–32 at halftime.

=== 2nd Half ===
During the 1st seven minutes of the 2nd half, neither team took a lead larger than 2 while Duke would have a 45–43 lead when they called a 30-second timeout. Then, Brian Zoubek would make a basket to give Duke a 47–43 lead. In the next 35 seconds, Gordon Hayward made two free throws to cut the Duke lead to 49–47. In the next minute, Jon Scheyer scored five points to give Duke a 56–51 lead. During the next 35 seconds after Butler called a 30-second timeout, Matt Howard and Gordon Hayward each made a pair of free throws to cut the Duke lead to 56-55 and Duke would call a 30-second timeout. Then, Kyle Singler made a basket to give Duke a 58–55 lead, and Butler would call a 30-second timeout. With 3:16 remaining, Nolan Smith made a pair of free throws to give Duke a 60–55 lead. Within the next minute after 1:50 was remaining in the game, Matt Howard scored four points to cut the Duke lead to 60–59. With 3 seconds left, Brian Zoubek made one of two free throws to give Duke a two-point lead. Gordon Hayward narrowly missed a buzzer-beating half-court shot which would have won the game for Butler and it resulted in a 61–59 win for Duke and the national championship.
