= 2009–10 Horizon League men's basketball season =

- League: NCAA Division I
- Sport: Basketball
- Duration: December 3, 2009 through February 27, 2010
- Teams: 10
- TV partner(s): Fox Sports Midwest, ESPN, CBS Sports, Horizon League Network

Regular Season
- Champions: Butler Bulldogs
- Coach of the Year: Brad Stevens, Butler
- Runners-up: Wright State Raiders
- Season MVP: Gordon Hayward, Butler
- Top scorer: Rahmon Fletcher, Green Bay

Tournament
- Champions: Butler
- Runners-up: Wright State
- Finals MVP: Matt Howard, Butler

Basketball seasons
- ← 2008–09 2010–11 →

2009–10 Horizon League men's basketball standings
| | Conf. | | | | Overall |
| Team | W | | L | PCT | W | | L | PCT |
|---|---|---|---|---|---|---|---|---|
| No. 11 Butler † | 18 | – | 0 | 1.000 | 33 | – | 5 | .868 |
| Wright State | 12 | – | 6 | .667 | 20 | – | 12 | .625 |
| Green Bay | 11 | – | 7 | .611 | 22 | – | 12 | .647 |
| Milwaukee | 10 | – | 8 | .556 | 20 | – | 14 | .588 |
| Cleveland State | 10 | – | 8 | .556 | 16 | – | 17 | .485 |
| Valparaiso | 10 | – | 8 | .556 | 15 | – | 17 | .469 |
| Detroit | 9 | – | 9 | .500 | 20 | – | 14 | .588 |
| Loyola Chicago | 5 | – | 13 | .278 | 14 | – | 16 | .467 |
| UIC | 3 | – | 15 | .167 | 8 | – | 22 | .267 |
| Youngstown State | 2 | – | 16 | .111 | 8 | – | 22 | .267 |
† 2010 Horizon League Tournament winner As of March 18, 2010; Rankings from AP Poll

The 2009–10 Horizon League men's basketball season marked the 30th season of Horizon League basketball.

== Preseason ==
In the preseason, Butler was the conference favorite - returning all players from their regular season HL championship team. Butler received all but three first-place votes in the preseason poll of HL coaches, media, and sports information directors. Wright State received the one first place vote, capturing second in the preseason poll, and defending HL Tournament champion Cleveland State claimed two first place votes, finishing third. The preseason player of the year was 2009 HL MVP Matt Howard of Butler. Also in the preseason, one HL player was named to both the John R. Wooden Award preseason candidate list and the Naismith Award preseason candidate list: Gordon Hayward of Butler.

=== HL Preseason Poll ===
| Rank | Team | Votes |
|---|---|---|
| 1 | Butler (43) | 455 |
| 2 | Wright State (1) | 398 |
| 3 | Cleveland State (2) | 324 |
| 4 | Milwaukee | 314 |
| 5 | Green Bay | 273 |
| 6 | Detroit | 209 |
| 7 | Youngstown | 197 |
| 8 | Valparaiso | 137 |
| 9 | Illinois-Chicago | 126 |
| 10 | Loyola-Chicago | 97 |

=== Preseason All-Horizon ===
==== First Team ====
- Matt Howard, Butler
- Gordon Hayward, Butler
- Norris Cole, Cleveland State
- Todd Brown, Wright State
- Vaughn Duggins, Wright State

==== Second Team ====
- Rahmon Fletcher, Green Bay
- Shelvin Mack, Butler
- Tone Boyle, Milwaukee
- Troy Cotton, Green Bay
- James Eayrs, Milwaukee

Preseason Player of the Year

- Matt Howard, Butler

== Conference awards & honors ==
=== Weekly awards ===
HL Players of the Week
Throughout the conference season, the HL offices name a player of the week.

| Week | Player of the week |
|---|---|
| November 16 | Todd Brown, Wright State |
| November 23 | Eli Holman, Detroit |
| November 30 | James Eayrs, Milwaukee |
| December 7 | Rahmon Fletcher, Green Bay |
| December 14 | Gordon Hayward, Butler |
| December 21 | Gordon Hayward, Butler |
| December 28 | Sirlester Martin, Youngstown State |
| January 4 | Shelvin Mack, Butler |
| January 11 | DeAndre Mays, Youngstown State |
| January 18 | Rahmon Fletcher, Green Bay; Chase Simon, Detroit |
| January 25 | Norris Cole, Cleveland State |
| February 1 | Chase Simon, Detroit |
| February 8 | Trevon Harmon, Cleveland State |
| February 15 | Gordon Hayward, Butler |
| February 22 | Rahmon Fletcher, Green Bay |
| March 1 | Anthony Hill, Milwaukee |

=== All-Conference Honors ===
| Honor | Recipient(s) | School | Position | Year |
|---|---|---|---|---|
| Player of the Year | Gordon Hayward | Butler | Guard/Forward | Sophomore |
| Coach of the Year | Brad Stevens | Butler | Head coach | 3rd |
| Newcomer of the Year | Brandon Wood | Valparaiso | Guard | Sophomore |
| Defensive Player of the Year | Ronald Nored | Butler | Guard | Sophomore |
| Defensive Player of the Year | Woody Payne | Detroit | Guard | Senior |
| Sixth Man of the Year | Walt Gibler | Loyola | Forward | Sophomore |
| All Horizon League First Team | Gordon Hayward | Butler | Guard/Forward | Sophomore |
| All Horizon League First Team | Rahmon Fletcher | Green Bay | Guard | Junior |
| All Horizon League First Team | Norris Cole | Cleveland State | Guard | Junior |
| All Horizon League First Team | Shelvin Mack | Butler | Guard | Sophomore |
| All Horizon League First Team | Matt Howard | Butler | Forward | Junior |
| All Horizon League Second Team | Vaughn Duggins | Wright State | Guard | Junior |
| All Horizon League Second Team | Brandon Wood | Valparaiso | Guard | Sophomore |
| All Horizon League Second Team | Ricky Franklin | Milwaukee | Guard | Senior |
| All Horizon League Second Team | Chase Simon | Detroit | Guard | Sophomore |
| All Horizon League Second Team | Cory Johnson | Valparaiso | Forward | Junior |
| All-Newcomer Team | Brandon Wood | Valparaiso | Guard | Sophomore |
| All-Newcomer Team | Chase Simon | Detroit | Guard | Sophomore |
| All-Newcomer Team | Cory Johnson | Valparaiso | Forward | Junior |
| All-Newcomer Team | Eli Holman | Detroit | Forward/Center | Sophomore |
| All-Newcomer Team | Xavier Keeling | Detroit | Forward | Junior |
| All Defensive Team | Ronald Nored | Butler | Guard | Sophomore |
| All Defensive Team | Woody Payne | Detroit | Guard | Senior |
| All Defensive Team | Willie Veasley | Butler | Forward | Senior |
| All Defensive Team | D'Aundray Brown | Cleveland State | Guard | Junior |
| All Defensive Team | Vaughn Duggins | Wright State | Guard | Junior |

=== Tournament honors ===
Matt Howard of Butler was named the tournament MVP.

| Horizon League All-Tournament Team | Player | School | Position | Year |
|---|---|---|---|---|
| Horizon League All-Tournament Team | Matt Howard | Butler | Forward | Junior |
| Horizon League All-Tournament Team | Shelvin Mack | Butler | Guard | Sophomore |
| Horizon League All-Tournament Team | Gordon Hayward | Butler | Guard/Forward | Sophomore |
| Horizon League All-Tournament Team | Ronald Nored | Butler | Guard | Junior |
| Horizon League All-Tournament Team | N'Gai Evans | Wright State | Guard | Junior |
