= 2009–10 Butler Bulldogs men's basketball team =

American college basketball season

2009–10 Butler Bulldogs men's basketball
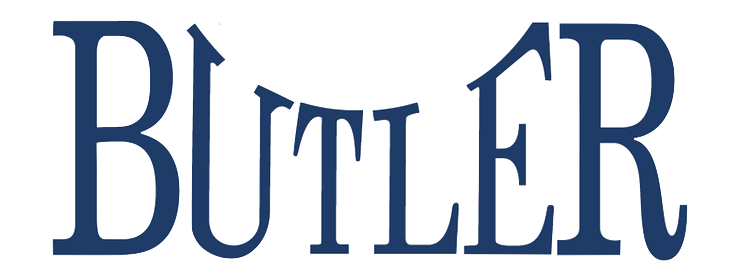

NCAA tournament, Runner-up Horizon League Regular Season champions Horizon League Tournament champions

National Championship Game, L 59–61 vs. Duke
- Conference: Horizon League

Ranking
- Coaches: No. 2
- AP: No. 11
- Record: 33–5 (18–0 Horizon)
- Head coach: Brad Stevens
- Assistant coaches: Matthew Graves; Terry Johnson; Micah Shrewsberry
- Home arena: Hinkle Fieldhouse

2009–10 Horizon League men's basketball standings
| | Conf. | | | | Overall |
| Team | W | | L | PCT | W | | L | PCT |
|---|---|---|---|---|---|---|---|---|
| No. 11 Butler † | 18 | – | 0 | 1.000 | 33 | – | 5 | .868 |
| Wright State | 12 | – | 6 | .667 | 20 | – | 12 | .625 |
| Green Bay | 11 | – | 7 | .611 | 22 | – | 12 | .647 |
| Milwaukee | 10 | – | 8 | .556 | 20 | – | 14 | .588 |
| Cleveland State | 10 | – | 8 | .556 | 16 | – | 17 | .485 |
| Valparaiso | 10 | – | 8 | .556 | 15 | – | 17 | .469 |
| Detroit | 9 | – | 9 | .500 | 20 | – | 14 | .588 |
| Loyola Chicago | 5 | – | 13 | .278 | 14 | – | 16 | .467 |
| UIC | 3 | – | 15 | .167 | 8 | – | 22 | .267 |
| Youngstown State | 2 | – | 16 | .111 | 8 | – | 22 | .267 |
† 2010 Horizon League Tournament winner As of March 18, 2010; Rankings from AP Poll

The 2009–10 Butler Bulldogs men's basketball team represented Butler University in the 2009–10 NCAA Division I men's basketball season. Their head coach was Brad Stevens, serving his 3rd year. The Bulldogs played their home games at the Hinkle Fieldhouse, which has a capacity of approximately 10,000.

The Bulldogs won the 2010 Horizon League men's basketball tournament to receive the Horizon's automatic bid to the 2010 NCAA Division I men's basketball tournament, earning a 5 seed in the West Region. They defeated 12 seed UTEP and 13 seed Murray State to advance to the Sweet Sixteen. The team next defeated 1 seed Syracuse to advance to the Elite Eight for the first time in school history, and then defeated 2 seed Kansas State to earn their first Final Four appearance in school history. They were only the second team from a mid-major conference to "officially" advance that far in the tournament since UNLV made the Final Four in 1991.

On April 3, 2010, Butler defeated Michigan State and advanced to the National Championship game against Duke. On April 5, just a few miles away from the Bulldogs' home court, Duke defeated Butler 61–59 in a back and forth game that ratings showed was the highest-rated Championship game of the decade.

== Roster ==
2009–10 Butler Bulldogs men's basketball team
Players
Coaches

| Pos. | # | Name | Height | Weight | Year | Previous school | Hometown |
|---|---|---|---|---|---|---|---|
| G/F | 11 | Alex Anglin (W) | 6 ft 5 in (1.96 m) | 177 lb (80 kg) | Jr | Kokomo | Kokomo, Indiana |
| F | 32 | Garrett Butcher | 6 ft 7 in (2.01 m) | 209 lb (95 kg) | So | Edgewood | Ellettsville, Indiana |
| G | 3 | Zach Hahn | 6 ft 1 in (1.85 m) | 176 lb (80 kg) | Jr | New Castle Chrysler | New Castle, Indiana |
| G/F | 20 | Gordon Hayward | 6 ft 9 in (2.06 m) | 207 lb (94 kg) | So | Brownsburg | Brownsburg, Indiana |
| F | 54 | Matt Howard | 6 ft 8 in (2.03 m) | 230 lb (104 kg) | Jr | Connersville | Connersville, Indiana |
| F | 24 | Avery Jukes | 6 ft 8 in (2.03 m) | 215 lb (98 kg) | Sr | South Gwinnett/Alabama | Snellville, Georgia |
| C | 30 | Emerson Kampen (W) | 6 ft 9 in (2.06 m) | 189 lb (86 kg) | RS Fr | Yorktown | Yorktown, Indiana |
| G | 22 | Grant Leiendecker | 6 ft 5 in (1.96 m) | 182 lb (83 kg) | RS Jr | Homestead | Fort Wayne, Indiana |
| G | 1 | Shelvin Mack | 6 ft 3 in (1.91 m) | 215 lb (98 kg) | So | Bryan Station | Lexington, Kentucky |
| G | 5 | Ronald Nored | 6 ft 0 in (1.83 m) | 174 lb (79 kg) | So | Homewood | Homewood, Alabama |
| G | 14 | Nick Rodgers (W) | 6 ft 2 in (1.88 m) | 168 lb (76 kg) | Sr | Noblesville | Noblesville, Indiana |
| C | 44 | Andrew Smith | 6 ft 11 in (2.11 m) | 239 lb (108 kg) | Fr | Covenant Christian | Indianapolis, Indiana |
| G | 33 | Chase Stigall | 6 ft 4 in (1.93 m) | 195 lb (88 kg) | RS Fr | New Castle Chrysler | New Castle, Indiana |
| G | 2 | Shawn Vanzant | 6 ft 0 in (1.83 m) | 172 lb (78 kg) | Jr | Wharton | Tampa, Florida |
| G/F | 21 | Willie Veasley | 6 ft 3 in (1.91 m) | 206 lb (93 kg) | Sr | Freeport | Freeport, Illinois |

Head coach

- Brad Stevens (DePauw)

Assistant coach(es)

- Matthew Graves (Butler)
- Terry Johnson (Purdue Fort Wayne)
- Micah Shrewsberry (Hanover)

Legend

- (C) Team captain
- (S) Suspended
- (I) Ineligible
- (W) Walk-on
- Injured
- Current redshirt

Roster
Last update: 8 April 2010

== Schedule ==
| Date time, TV | Rank^{#} | Opponent^{#} | Result | Record | Site city, state |
Italy Exhibition Trip
| August 6* | No. 11 | vs. Switzerland | L 72–76 | | Milan, Italy |
| August 7* | No. 11 | vs. Switzerland | L 90–100 | | Milan, Italy |
| August 10* | No. 11 | vs. Prima Veroli | W 103–45 | | Rome, Italy |
| August 11* | No. 11 | vs. Prima Veroli | W 94–37 | | Rome, Italy |
Exhibition
| November 1*; 7:00 pm | No. 11 | DePauw | W 77–45 | | Hinkle Fieldhouse; Indianapolis, IN |
| November 7*; 2:00 pm | No. 11 | Taylor | W 75–44 | | Hinkle Fieldhouse; Indianapolis, IN |
Non-conference regular season
| November 14*; 2:00 pm, WHMB-40 and HLN | No. 11 | Davidson | W 73–62 | 1–0 | Hinkle Fieldhouse (6,713); Indianapolis, IN |
| November 18*; 8:00 pm, BTN | No. 11 | at Northwestern | W 67–54 | 2–0 | Welsh-Ryan Arena (4,368); Evanston, IL |
| November 21*; 8:00 pm, WNDY-23 | No. 11 | at Evansville | W 64–60 | 3–0 | Roberts Municipal Stadium (6,913); Evansville, IN |
| November 26*; 8:30 pm, ESPN2 | No. 12 | vs. No. 22 Minnesota; 76 Classic | L 73–82 | 3–1 | Anaheim Convention Center (2,697); Anaheim, CA |
| November 27*; 11:30 am, ESPNU | No. 12 | vs. UCLA; 76 Classic | W 69–67 | 4–1 | Anaheim Convention Center (3,027); Anaheim, CA |
| November 29*; 7:30 pm, ESPNU | No. 12 | vs. No. 19 Clemson; 76 Classic | L 69–70 | 4–2 | Anaheim Convention Center (2,057); Anaheim, CA |
| December 2*; 7:00 pm, WTTV-4 | No. 23 | at Ball State | W 59–38 | 5–2 | John E. Worthen Arena (6,996); Muncie, IN |
| December 5; 7:00 pm, WNDY-23 and HLN | No. 23 | Valparaiso | W 84–67 | 6–2 (1–0) | Hinkle Fieldhouse (6,125); Indianapolis, IN |
| December 8*; 5:00 pm, ESPN | No. 22 | vs. No. 15 Georgetown; Jimmy V Classic | L 65–72 | 6–3 (1–0) | Madison Square Garden (8,975); New York, NY |
| December 12*; 12:00 pm, ESPN | No. 22 | No. 13 Ohio State | W 74–66 | 7–3 (1–0) | Hinkle Fieldhouse (9,338); Indianapolis, IN |
| December 19*; 2:00 pm, ESPN2 | No. 21 | Xavier | W 69–68 | 8–3 (1–0) | Hinkle Fieldhouse (9,114); Indianapolis, IN |
| December 22*; 8:00 pm | No. 20 | at UAB | L 57–67 | 8–4 (1–0) | Bartow Arena (8,367); Birmingham, AL |
Horizon League Play
| December 31; 7:00 pm, WNDY-23 and HLN | | Green Bay | W 72–49 | 9–4 (2–0) | Hinkle Fieldhouse (6,754); Indianapolis, IN |
| January 2; 2:00 pm, WNDY-23 and HLN | | Milwaukee | W 80–67 | 10–4 (3–0) | Hinkle Fieldhouse (6,151); Indianapolis, IN |
| January 8; 7:00 pm, WNDY-23 and HLN | | at Wright State | W 77–65 | 11–4 (4–0) | Ervin J. Nutter Center (9,674); Fairborn, OH |
| January 10; 1:00 pm, Fox Sports and HLN | | at Detroit | W 64–62 ^{OT} | 12–4 (5–0) | Calihan Hall (4,493); Detroit, MI |
| January 14; 7:00 pm, WNDY-23 and HLN | | Cleveland State | W 64–55 | 13–4 (6–0) | Hinkle Fieldhouse (5,383); Indianapolis, IN |
| January 16; 2:00 pm, WNDY-23 and HLN | | Youngstown State | W 91–61 | 14–4 (7–0) | Hinkle Fieldhouse (7,639); Indianapolis, IN |
| January 21; 5:30 pm, WNDY-23 and HLN | | at Loyola | W 48–47 | 15–4 (8–0) | Joseph J. Gentile Center (4,372); Chicago, IL |
| January 23; 2:00 pm, WNDY-23 and HLN | | at UIC | W 84–55 | 16–4 (9–0) | UIC Pavilion (5,446); Chicago, IL |
| January 29; 9:00 pm, ESPNU | | at Green Bay | W 75–57 | 17–4 (10–0) | Resch Center (6,237); Green Bay, WI |
| January 31; 2:00 pm, HLN | | at Milwaukee | W 73–66 | 18–4 (11–0) | US Cellular Arena (5,012); Milwaukee, WI |
| February 4; 7:00 pm, WNDY-23 and HLN | No. 23 | Detroit | W 63–58 | 19–4 (12–0) | Hinkle Fieldhouse (5,212); Indianapolis, IN |
| February 6; 8:00 pm, ESPN2 | No. 23 | Wright State | W 74–62 | 20–4 (13–0) | Hinkle Fieldhouse (8,528); Indianapolis, IN |
| February 8; 7:00 pm, WNDY-23 and HLN | No. 18 | Loyola | W 62–47 | 21–4 (14–0) | Hinkle Fieldhouse (5,231); Indianapolis, IN |
| February 11; 7:00 pm, HLN | No. 18 | at Youngstown State | W 68–57 | 22–4 (15–0) | Beeghly Center (4,122); Youngstown, OH |
| February 13; 2:00 pm, WNDY-23 and HLN | No. 18 | at Cleveland State | W 70–59 | 23–4 (16–0) | Wolstein Center (4,681); Cleveland, OH |
| February 17; 7:00 pm, WNDY-23 and HLN | No. 18 | UIC | W 73–55 | 24–4 (17–0) | Hinkle Fieldhouse (5,095); Indianapolis, IN |
| February 20*; 11:00 am, ESPN2 | No. 18 | Siena; Bracket Buster | W 70–53 | 25–4 | Hinkle Fieldhouse (9,111); Indianapolis, IN |
| February 26; 9:00 pm, ESPNU | No. 15 | at Valparaiso | W 74–69 | 26–4 (18–0) | Athletics-Recreation Center (5,266); Valparaiso, IN |
Horizon League Tournament
| March 6; 8:00 pm, ESPNU | (1) No. 12 | (4) Milwaukee; Semifinals | W 68–59 | 27–4 | Hinkle Fieldhouse (6,327); Indianapolis, IN |
| March 9; 9:00 pm, ESPN | (1) No. 12 | (2) Wright State; Finals | W 70–45 | 28–4 | Hinkle Fieldhouse (6,065); Indianapolis, IN |
NCAA tournament
| March 18*; 4:45 pm, CBS | (5 W) No. 11 | vs. (12 W) UTEP; First Round | W 77–59 | 29–4 | HP Pavilion (12,712); San Jose, CA |
| March 20*; 3:20 pm, CBS | (5 W) No. 11 | vs. (13 W) Murray State; Second Round | W 54–52 | 30–4 | HP Pavilion (16,044); San Jose, CA |
| March 25*; 7:07 pm, CBS | (5 W) No. 11 | vs. (1 W) No. 4 Syracuse; Sweet Sixteen | W 63–59 | 31–4 | EnergySolutions Arena (17,254); Salt Lake City, UT |
| March 27*; 4:30 pm, CBS | (5 W) No. 11 | vs. (2 W) No. 7 Kansas State; Elite Eight | W 63–56 | 32–4 | EnergySolutions Arena (17,587); Salt Lake City, UT |
| April 3*; 6:07 pm, CBS | (5 W) No. 11 | vs. (5 MW) No. 13 Michigan State; Final Four | W 52–50 | 33–4 | Lucas Oil Stadium (71,298); Indianapolis, IN |
| April 5*; 9:21 pm, CBS | (5 W) No. 11 | vs. (1 S) No. 3 Duke; National Championship Game | L 59–61 | 33–5 | Lucas Oil Stadium (70,930); Indianapolis, IN |
*Non-conference game. ^{#}Rankings from Coaches' Poll. (#) Tournament seedings in parentheses. All times are in Eastern Time. (#) Indicates seed in NCAA tournament. WR = West Region. MR = Midwest Region. SR = South Region. HLN = Horizon League Network.

== Rankings ==
Ranking movement Legend: ██ Improvement in ranking. ██ Decrease in ranking.
| Poll | Pre | Wk 1 | Wk 2 | Wk 3 | Wk 4 | Wk 5 | Wk 6 | Wk 7 | Wk 8 | Wk 9 | Wk 10 | Wk 11 | Wk 12 | Wk 13 | Wk 14 | Wk 15 | Wk 16 | WK 17 | Wk 18 | Final |
|---|---|---|---|---|---|---|---|---|---|---|---|---|---|---|---|---|---|---|---|---|
| AP | 11 | 11 | 12 | 23 | 22 | 21 | 20 | ORV | ORV | ORV | ORV | ORV | 23 | 18 | 18 | 15 | 12 | 12 | 11 | 2 |
| Coaches | 10 | 10 | 10 | 20 | 20 | 17 | 16 | 23 | 24 | 22 | 20 | 18 | 15 | 15 | 13 | 10 | 11 | 12 | 8 | 2 |
| Mid-Major | 1 | 1 | 1 | 2 | 1 | 2 | 1 | 3 | 3 | 3 | 3 | 2 | 1 | 1 | 1 | 1 | 1 | 1 | 1 | 1 |

== Preseason ==
Fueled in large part by Gordon Hayward's and Shelvin Mack's roles leading team USA to the gold medal in the FIBA Under-19 World Championship during the off-season, Butler began the season ranked 10th in the Coaches' Poll and 11th in the AP Poll. A few commentators picked the Bulldogs as a possible "sleeper team" to make the Final Four. Stevens wasn't so sure, privately telling his father, "We have a really good team, and I’m not sure how far we can go this year, but next year, we ought to go really far."

=== Preseason awards ===
| # | Name | Class | Award |
|---|---|---|---|
| 20 | Gordon Hayward | So. | Naismith Award Pre-Season Candidate; John R. Wooden All-American Pre-Season Candidate; CollegeHoops.net Preseason Mid-Major Player of the Year; CollegeHoops.net First Team Mid-Major All-America; CollegeHoops.net Preseason All-American Honorable Mention; Pre-Season All-Horizon 1st Team (Horizon League Media) |
| 54 | Matt Howard | Jr. | CollegeHoops.net First Team Mid-Major All-America; Horizon League Preseason Player of the Year; Pre-Season All-Horizon 1st Team (Horizon League Media) |
| 1 | Shelvin Mack | So. | Pre-Season All-Horizon 2nd Team (Horizon League Media) |

== Regular season ==
=== Regular season awards ===
| # | Name | Class | Season Awards |
|---|---|---|---|
| 20 | Gordon Hayward | So. | 76 Classic All-Tournament Team; 12/14 Horizon League Player of the Week; 12/15 USBWA Oscar Robertson National Player of the Week; 12/21 Horizon League Player of the Week; 2010 Wooden Player of the Year Midseason Watchlist; Sporting News' Midseason Mid-Major All-American; COSIDA/ESPN Magazine Academic All-District V 2/15 Horizon League Player of the Week; Academic All-American 3rd Team; Naismith Award Midseason Candidate |
| 54 | Matt Howard | Jr. | COSIDA/ESPN Magazine Academic All-District V Academic All-American 1st Team |
| 1 | Shelvin Mack | So. | 1/4 Horizon League Player of the Week |

=== Regular season game capsules ===
11/14 – Butler vs Davidson

| Teams | 1st Half | 2nd Half | Final |
| DAV | 35 | 27 | 62 |
| BU | 37 | 36 | 73 |

Butler Slips Past Davidson In Season-Opener Sophomore Gordon Hayward scored 17 points and senior Willie Veasley added 15 to lead Butler to a 73–62 victory over visiting Davidson in the first game of the 2009–10 season for both teams at Hinkle Fieldhouse on Saturday, Nov. 14. It was Butler's fourth straight win in a season-opener.

11/18 – Butler at Northwestern

| Teams | 1st Half | 2nd Half | Final |
| BU | 30 | 37 | 67 |
| NW | 24 | 30 | 54 |

Butler Rolls Past Northwestern, 67–54 Shelvin Mack scored a team-high 15 points and added eight assists and Gordon Hayward chipped in with 14 points and 10 rebounds to help lead visiting Butler to a 67–54 victory over Northwestern in a non-league test at Welsh-Ryan Arena on Wednesday (Nov. 18). It was the second straight win for the No. 10/11 ranked Bulldogs to open the season.

11/21 – Butler at Evansville

| Teams | 1st Half | 2nd Half | Final |
| BU | 27 | 37 | 64 |
| EVAN | 20 | 40 | 60 |

Bulldogs Slip Past Evansville Shelvin Mack led four players in double-figures with 17 points and visiting Butler held off a late Evansville charge to post a 64–60 non-league victory at Roberts Stadium on Saturday, Nov. 21. It was the third straight victory to open the season for the No. 10/11 ranked Bulldogs.

11/26 – Butler vs #16 Minnesota (76 Classic)

| Teams | 1st Half | 2nd Half | Final |
| MINN | 32 | 50 | 82 |
| BU | 28 | 45 | 73 |

Bulldogs Fall To #16 Minnesota At 76 Classic
Butler committed a season-high 21 turnovers and shot just 33% for the game, while falling to #16 Minnesota, 82–73, in the opening round of the 2009 76 Classic in Anaheim, Calif., on Thursday, Nov. 26. The loss was the first this season for the No. 10/12 ranked Bulldogs.

11/27 – Butler vs UCLA (76 Classic)

| Teams | 1st Half | 2nd Half | Final |
| BU | 42 | 27 | 69 |
| UCLA | 35 | 32 | 67 |

Butler Edges UCLA At 76 Classic Sophomore Shelvin Mack posted his second consecutive 20-point scoring performance and Gordon Hayward hit two clutch free throws with less than a second left in the game to lift Butler to a 69–67 victory over UCLA in the consolation round of the 76 Classic in Anaheim, Calif., on Friday (Nov. 27). The victory sends the Bulldogs (4–1) into the consolation finals against #19 Clemson on Sunday (Nov. 29).

11/29 – Butler vs #19 Clemson (76 Classic)

| Teams | 1st Half | 2nd Half | Final |
| CLEM | 26 | 44 | 70 |
| BU | 33 | 36 | 69 |

Butler Falls To #19 Clemson In Closing Seconds Demontez Stitt hit two free throws with 0:03.3 left on the clock to lift #19 Clemson to a 70–69 come-from-behind victory over Butler in the fifth place game of the 76 Classic in Anaheim, Calif., on Sunday (Nov. 29). The loss was Butler's second to a nationally ranked team in four days and left the Bulldogs at 4–2 on the young season.

12/02 – Butler at Ball State

| Teams | 1st Half | 2nd Half | Final |
| BU | 29 | 30 | 59 |
| BALL | 11 | 27 | 38 |

Bulldogs Cruise Past Ball State, 59–38 Sophomores Gordon Hayward and Shelvin Mack each scored 15 points and junior Matt Howard added 11 to lead visiting Butler to a 59–38 victory over Ball State at Worthen Arena in Muncie on Wednesday (Dec. 2). The victory lifted the Bulldogs to 5–2 on the young season.

12/05 – Butler vs Valparaiso

| Teams | 1st Half | 2nd Half | Final |
| VALP | 32 | 35 | 67 |
| BU | 38 | 46 | 84 |

Bulldogs Pull Away From Valparaiso, 84–67 Butler used a balanced offensive attack and an aggressive defense to turn a close game into an 84–67 victory over visiting Valparaiso in the Horizon League opener for both teams at Hinkle Fieldhouse on Saturday (Dec. 5). The Bulldogs, playing at home for just the second time this season, improved to 6–2 on the year.

12/08 – Butler vs #13 Georgetown (Jimmy V Classic)

| Teams | 1st Half | 2nd Half | Final |
| BU | 31 | 34 | 65 |
| GTWN | 39 | 33 | 72 |

Georgetown Beats Bulldogs In Jimmy V Classic Center Greg Monroe posted career-highs of 24 points and 15 rebounds and guard Austin Freeman added 18 points to lead #15/13 Georgetown to a 72–65 victory over Butler in the Jimmy V Classic at Madison Square Garden in New York on Tuesday (Dec. 8). It was Butler's third loss in nine outings, all to teams ranked in the “Top 25.”

12/12 – Butler vs #15 Ohio State

| Teams | 1st Half | 2nd Half | Final |
| OSU | 36 | 30 | 66 |
| BU | 34 | 40 | 74 |

Butler Holds Off Ohio State, 74–66 Sophomore Gordon Hayward scored 24 points and senior Willie Veasley added his first career double-double to lead Butler to a 74–66 victory over #13/15 Ohio State in a nationally televised game at Hinkle Fieldhouse on Saturday, Dec. 12. The victory lifted the Bulldogs to 7–3 on the season.

12/19 – Butler vs Xavier

| Teams | 1st Half | 2nd Half | Final |
| XAV | 32 | 36 | 68 |
| BU | 39 | 30 | 69 |

Butler Edges Xavier, 69–68 Sophomore Gordon Hayward hit a lay-up with 0:01.2 left on the clock to lift Butler to a 69–68 come-from-behind victory over visiting Xavier in a hard-fought, non-league game at Hinkle Fieldhouse on Saturday (Dec. 19). The dramatic, game-winning play also set off a series of events that kept the outcome in doubt for an additional 10–15 minutes.

12/22 – Butler at UAB

| Teams | 1st Half | 2nd Half | Final |
| BU | 22 | 35 | 57 |
| UAB | 32 | 35 | 67 |

Bulldogs Fall At UAB, 67–57 UAB scoring leader Elija Millsap, held in check for most of the game, sparked a 10–2 scoring run in the final two minutes to lead the host Blazers to a 67–57 victory over Butler in a non-league test at Bartow Arena on Tuesday, Dec. 22. The victory was the tenth straight for the 11–1 Blazers.

12/31 – Butler vs Green Bay

| Teams | 1st Half | 2nd Half | Final |
| GB | 27 | 22 | 49 |
| BU | 35 | 37 | 72 |

Butler Cruises Past Green Bay In First Place Showdown Shelvin Mack scored 14 points and Gordon Hayward added 13 to lead a balanced Butler squad to a 72–49 victory over visiting Green Bay in a Horizon League first place showdown at Hinkle Fieldhouse on New Year's Eve. The victory lifted the Bulldogs to 9–4 on the season and left Butler as the league's last unbeaten team at 2–0.

1/2 – Butler vs Milwaukee

| Teams | 1st Half | 2nd Half | Final |
| MILW | 28 | 39 | 67 |
| BU | 37 | 43 | 80 |

Bulldogs Roll Past Milwaukee Shelvin Mack posted a career-high scoring total and Gordon Hayward added his sixth double-double of the season to help power Butler past visiting Milwaukee, 80–67, in a Horizon League game at Hinkle Fieldhouse on Saturday, Jan. 2. The win lifted the Bulldogs to 10–4 on the season and kept Butler unbeaten in three league outings.

1/8 – Butler at Wright State

| Teams | 1st Half | 2nd Half | Final |
| BU | 37 | 40 | 77 |
| WRST | 26 | 39 | 65 |

Butler Holds Off Wright State, 77–65 Sophomore Shelvin Mack sparked Butler to a big first half lead and teammate Gordon Hayward the Bulldogs pad the margin in the second half of a 77–65 victory over Wright State in Fairborn, Ohio, on Friday, Jan. 8. The victory lifted Butler to 11–4 on the season and kept the Bulldogs unbeaten (4–0) in Horizon League play.

1/10 – Butler at Detroit

| Teams | 1st Half | 2nd Half | OT | Final |
| BU | 23 | 32 | 9 | 64 |
| DET | 20 | 35 | 7 | 62 |

Bulldogs Escape With Overtime Win At Detroit Sophomore Shelvin Mack scored the go-ahead basket with under a minute left in overtime and Butler survived a desperation three-point field goal attempt at the buzzer to post a 64–62 victory over Detroit in a first place showdown at Calihan Hall on Sunday, Jan. 10. The heart-stopping win lifted Butler to 12–4 on the season and kept the Bulldogs unbeaten with a 5–0 mark in the Horizon League.

1/14 – Butler vs Cleveland State

| Teams | 1st Half | 2nd Half | Final |
| CLEV | 31 | 24 | 55 |
| BU | 30 | 34 | 65 |

Bulldogs Overtake Cleveland State In Second Half Butler overcame a slow start with a big finish to down visiting Cleveland State, 64–55, in a key Horizon League game at Hinkle Fieldhouse on Thursday, Jan. 14. The hard-fought victory, Butler's fifth in a row, lifted the Bulldogs to 13–4 on the season and 6–0 in the Horizon League.

1/16 – Butler vs Youngstown State

| Teams | 1st Half | 2nd Half | Final |
| YSU | 26 | 35 | 61 |
| BU | 49 | 42 | 91 |

Defense Lifts Butler Over Youngstown State A first half defense was the key to a win for Brad Stevens’ Butler Bulldogs at Hinkle Fieldhouse Saturday, Jan. 16. This 91–61 victory over Youngstown State was the sixth in a row and concluded a two-game home stand for the Bulldogs. With the win the Bulldogs improve to 14–4 on the season and 7–0 in Horizon League play.

1/21 – Butler at Loyola-Chicago

| Teams | 1st Half | 2nd Half | Final |
| BU | 30 | 18 | 48 |
| L-IL | 26 | 21 | 47 |

Butler Escapes With One-Point Win At Loyola Senior Willie Veasley calmly sank the second of two free throws with 0:34 left in the game to lift Butler to a 48–47 victory over host Loyola in a tightly contested Horizon League game on Thursday, Jan. 21. The victory, Butler's seventh in a row, boosted the Bulldogs to 15–4 on the season and 8–0 in league action.

1/23 – Butler at Illinois-Chicago

| Teams | 1st Half | 2nd Half | Final |
| BU | 37 | 47 | 84 |
| UIC | 26 | 29 | 55 |

Bulldogs Roll To 84–55 Victory At UIC Sophomore Gordon Hayward scored a season-high 25 points and teammate Shelvin Mack added 15 to lead Butler to an 84–55 Horizon League victory over UIC at the UIC Pavilion on Saturday (Jan. 23). The win, Butler's eighth in a row, lifted the #20-ranked Bulldogs to 16–4 on the year and 9–0 in the Horizon League.

1/29 – Butler at Green Bay

| Teams | 1st Half | 2nd Half | Final |
| BU | 34 | 39 | 73 |
| GB | 35 | 31 | 66 |

Hot Second Half Lifts Bulldogs At Green Bay Junior Matt Howard scored 18 points and senior Willie Veasley added 13 points and eight rebounds to lead Butler past host Green Bay at the Resch Center on Friday, Jan. 29. The win was Butler's ninth straight and lifted the first place Bulldogs to 17–4 on the season and 10–0 in the Horizon League.

1/31 – Butler at Milwaukee

| Teams | 1st Half | 2nd Half | Final |
| BU | 34 | 39 | 73 |
| MILW | 35 | 31 | 66 |

Butler Rallies For Win At Milwaukee Sophomore Gordon Hayward scored a game-high 25 points and sophomore Ronald Nored added a career-high 13, including 11 in the second half, to help Butler overcome a seven-point deficit and post a 73–66 victory at Milwaukee on Sunday, Jan. 31. The win, Butler's 10th in a row, lifted the first place Bulldogs to 18–4 on the season and 11–0 in the Horizon League.

2/4 – Butler vs. Detroit

| Teams | 1st Half | 2nd Half | Final |
| DET | 26 | 32 | 58 |
| BU | 30 | 33 | 63 |

Poised Group Finds Way to Win Against Detroit The experience of the Bulldogs showed as they were able to fight through 21 turnovers to grab a 63–58 victory over Detroit Thursday night at Hinkle Fieldhouse. Butler moved to 19–4 on the season and a perfect 12–0 in Horizon League play becoming the first team in school history to start 12–0 in league play.

2/6 – Butler vs. Wright State

| Teams | 1st Half | 2nd Half | Final |
| WRST | 29 | 33 | 62 |
| BU | 35 | 39 | 74 |

Perfect Veasley Carries Bulldogs Past Wright State Butler, led by senior Willie Veasley, shot a crisp 67.5 percent from the field and pulled away from Wright State in the second half to win 74–62 Saturday Feb. 6 at Hinkle Fieldhouse. The win was the 12th in a row for Butler and moved them to a perfect 13–0 in Horizon League play.

2/8 – Butler vs. Loyola

| Teams | 1st Half | 2nd Half | Final |
| L-IL | 26 | 21 | 47 |
| BU | 24 | 38 | 62 |

Butler Clinches a Share of Fourth Consecutive League Title Matt Howard scored a game-high 20 points and Butler won its third game in five days to clinch at least a share of its fourth consecutive Horizon League regular season title. The Bulldogs came back in the second half to beat Loyola 62–47 at Hinkle Fieldhouse on Monday to improve to 14–0 in Horizon League play.

2/11 – Butler at Youngstown State

| Teams | 1st Half | 2nd Half | Final |
| BU | 31 | 37 | 68 |
| YSU | 30 | 27 | 57 |

Bulldogs Clinch Horizon League Title Gordon Hayward scored 22 points and grabbed a career-high 17 rebounds and Butler pulled away in the second half to hand host Youngstown State a 68–57 setback and clinch its fourth consecutive Horizon League championship at the Beeghly Center on Thursday (Feb. 11). The victory was Butler's 14th straight, the second-longest winning streak in school history.

2/13 – Butler at Cleveland State

| Teams | 1st Half | 2nd Half | Final |
| BU | 29 | 41 | 70 |
| CLEV | 27 | 32 | 59 |

Bulldogs Roll To 15th Straight Win Matt Howard scored 21 points and grabbed 13 rebounds and Gordon Hayward added 19 points and 11 rebounds to lead visiting Butler to a 70–59 victory over Cleveland State in a match-up of the Horizon League's top two teams on Saturday, Feb. 13. The win was Butler's 15th straight, tying the longest winning streak in school history!

2/17 – Butler vs. Illinois-Chicago

| Teams | 1st Half | 2nd Half | Final |
| UIC | 25 | 30 | 55 |
| BU | 32 | 41 | 73 |

Bulldogs Roll To Record 17th League Win Junior Matt Howard scored 17 points, sophomore Ronald Nored added a career-high 16, and Butler picked up its Horizon League-record 17th league win with a 73–55 victory over visiting UIC at Hinkle Fieldhouse on Wednesday, Feb. 17. The win boosted the Bulldogs to 24–4 on the season and kept Butler unbeaten in league play.

2/20 – Butler vs. Siena

| Teams | 1st Half | 2nd Half | Final |
| SIE | 31 | 22 | 53 |
| BU | 28 | 42 | 70 |

Mack and Hayward Lead Way to BracketBuster Win on Senior Day Shelvin Mack scored 23 points and Gordon Hayward added a double-double to help the Bulldogs beat the Siena Saints, 70–53, on Feb. 20 at Hinkle Fieldhouse. The win was Butler's second straight Bracketbuster win (Davidson 2009). With the win, the Bulldogs extend their win streak to the 17, which is tied for the best in the nation.

2/26 – Butler at Valparaiso

| Teams | 1st Half | 2nd Half | Final |
| BU | 30 | 44 | 74 |
| VALP | 31 | 38 | 69 |

Butler Completes Unbeaten League Season Senior Willie Veasley scored a career-high 20 points and Butler pulled away in the second half to hand host Valparaiso a 74–69 setback and become the first team in Horizon League history to finish with an 18–0 record. The win lifted the #15/10 Bulldogs to 26–4 on the season.

== Postseason ==
=== Postseason awards ===
| # | Name | Class | Season Awards |
|---|---|---|---|
| 20 | Gordon Hayward | So. | Horizon League Player of the Year; All-Horizon League (1st Team); Horizon League All-Tournament Team; 2010 Wooden Player of the Year Finalist; 2010 NCAA West Regional MVP; 2010 NCAA Championship All-Tournament Team |
| 54 | Matt Howard | Jr. | All-Horizon League (1st Team); Horizon League All-Tournament Team; Horizon League Tournament MVP; Elite 88 Award Winner |
| 1 | Shelvin Mack | So. | All-Horizon League (1st Team); Horizon League All-Tournament Team; 2010 NCAA Championship All-Tournament Team |
| 5 | Ronald Nored | So. | Horizon League Defensive Player of the Year; Horizon League All-Defensive Team; Horizon League All-Tournament Team |
| 21 | Willie Veasley | Sr. | Horizon League All-Defensive Team |
| Coach | Brad Stevens | 3rd | Horizon League Coach of the Year |

=== Postseason game capsules ===
==== Horizon League tournament ====
3/6 – Butler vs Milwaukee (Horizon League Semifinals)

| Teams | 1st Half | 2nd Half | Final |
| MILW | 29 | 30 | 59 |
| BU | 28 | 40 | 68 |

Bulldogs Begin Horizon League Tournament Play For the third straight year, Butler won't have to leave Hinkle Fieldhouse in its bid for a league tournament championship. The top-seeded Bulldogs will begin play in the 2010 Speedway Horizon League Men's Basketball Championship at home in the semifinals on Saturday, March 6.

3/9 – Butler vs Wright State (Horizon League Championship)

| Teams | 1st Half | 2nd Half | Final |
| WRST | 28 | 17 | 45 |
| BU | 42 | 28 | 70 |

Bulldogs Capture Horizon League Tournament Crown Junior Matt Howard and sophomore Shelvin Mack each scored 14 points and top-seeded Butler unleashed a smothering defense to dispatch #2 Wright State, 70–45, in the title game of the 2010 Speedway Horizon League Men's Basketball Championship at Hinkle Fieldhouse on Tuesday (Mar. 9). The win extended Butler's nation-leading winning streak to 20 in a row.

==== NCAA tournament ====
3/18 – Butler vs #25 (12 seed) Texas-El Paso (NCAA tournament – round 1)

| Teams | 1st Half | 2nd Half | Final |
| UTEP | 33 | 26 | 59 |
| BU | 27 | 50 | 77 |

Bulldogs Advance Past UTEP To NCAA Second Round Of the 32 first-round games, the match up between Butler and UTEP was the only one featuring two nationally ranked teams (UTEP was ranked 24th entering the game). Many basketball commentators picked UTEP to pull the upset, and in the first half of the game it looked like they might be right. UTEP outplayed Butler to take a 33–27 halftime lead. Stevens rallied the team, and the Bulldogs came out firing on all cylinders in the second half. Shelvin Mack hit two three-pointers within 90 seconds to tie the game and ignite a 22–4 run to start the half. Butler won the game 77–59 sinking 13 three-pointers. Shelvin Mack led the team with 25 points.

3/20 – Butler vs (13 seed) Murray St. (NCAA tournament – round 2)

| Teams | 1st Half | 2nd Half | Final |
| MURR | 26 | 26 | 52 |
| BU | 22 | 32 | 54 |

Late Defense Sends Bulldogs To Sweet 16 In the second round, Butler faced off with 13th seeded Murray State. The game was close throughout and was tied at 50 with a minute to go. Ronald Nored put Butler ahead with a layup and added a free throw to make it 53–50 with 25.4 seconds remaining. Murray State made two free throws to cut the gap, but was forced to foul Matt Howard to extend the game. Howard hit 1 of 2 free throws, giving Murray State a chance to tie or win the game on its final possession. With less than five seconds on the clock, Hayward deflected a Murray State pass into the back court. By the time the ball was recovered, the game was over and Stevens was heading to his first Sweet Sixteen.

3/25 – Butler vs. #4 (1 seed) Syracuse (NCAA tournament – Sweet Sixteen)

| Teams | 1st Half | 2nd Half | Final |
| BU | 35 | 28 | 63 |
| SYR | 25 | 34 | 59 |

Butler Headed To Elite Eight Butler faced top-seeded Syracuse. Unlike their first two games, the Bulldogs got off to a good start, jumping out to a 12–1 lead and taking a 35–25 lead to the break. Syracuse rallied in the second half, taking its first lead of the game, 40–39, off a Wes Johnson three-pointer. Stevens called timeout and Butler regained the lead on its next possession. The game remained tight for the next several minutes. At the 5:32 mark, Syracuse got a rare fast break opportunity that ended with a dunk and 54–50 lead. Stevens again called time out and Butler responded by holding Syracuse scoreless for the next 5 minutes. Butler took a 60–54 lead on a Willie Veasley tip in at the 0:59 mark and held on to win 63–59. The win allowed Butler to advance to the Elite Eight for the first time in school history.

3/27 – Butler vs. #7 (2 seed) Kansas St. (NCAA tournament – Elite Eight)

| Teams | 1st Half | 2nd Half | Final |
| BU | 27 | 36 | 63 |
| KSU | 20 | 36 | 56 |

BU's NEXT STOP: Final Four In Indy! The Bulldogs met 2nd-seeded Kansas State in the regional finals. Perhaps feeling the effects of their double overtime 101–96 win two days prior, Kansas State got off to a slow start, scoring just 20 points in the first half to trail 27–20. Butler kept the lead in the upper single digits for most of the second half and led 49–39 with 7:38 to go. Kansas State then went on a 13–2 and took a 52–51 lead on a Denis Clemente 3-pointer with 4:50 to go. Brad Stevens immediately called time out and re-focused the team. "Play your game. Just play your game" he told the team. On the ensuing possession, Hayward pulled down an offensive rebounded on a Mack miss and was fouled. He hit both free throws and Butler didn't trail again, out-scoring Kansas State 12–2 before the Wildcats hit a meaningless shot at the buzzer to make the final margin 63–56. When asked how Butler won the game, Howard said "It’s all five guys out there defending, helping each other".

In the post game celebration, Stevens and walk-on forward Emerson Kampen connected on a flying back-bump that soon became one of the iconic images of the tournament. Stevens adopted the move after he saw it bringing together teammates during pregame rituals. Stevens and Kampden did a back-bump in the locker room after the Murray State and Syracuse games, revealing it to the public after beating Kansas State.

The win earned the Bulldogs a trip back to Indianapolis for the first Final Four appearance in school and Horizon League history. The win made Stevens, at age 33, the youngest coach to lead a team to the Final Four since Bob Knight made his first Final Four appearance at age 32 in 1973. Butler became the smallest school (enrollment 4,200) to make the Final Four since seeding began in 1979.

4/3 – Butler vs. #13/#12 (5 seed) Michigan St. (NCAA tournament – Final Four)

| Teams | 1st Half | 2nd Half | Final |
| BU | 28 | 24 | 52 |
| MSU | 28 | 22 | 50 |

Bulldogs Advance To National Title Game Brad Stevens and the Butler Bulldogs faced off with Michigan State in the national semi-finals. Korie Lucious opened the game by hitting two straight three-pointers, but Gordon Hayward responded with two three-pointers of his own to tie the score at 6. Butler took a 7–6 lead on a Shelvin Mack free throw before Michigan State went on an 8–0 run. Matt Howard got in early foul trouble and sat most of the first half. Butler fought back though, tying the game at 28 on a Mack three-pointer with 35 seconds left in the first half.

Lucious hit another three to open the second half, giving Michigan State a 31–28 lead. The teams traded the lead a few times before Mack hit a layup to put Butler up 34–33 with 17:43 to go. Butler then held Michigan State scoreless for the next 3:30, pushing the lead to 38–33. After two free throws by Howard made the Butler lead 46–41 with 9:24 to go, both teams locked down on defense. The score was 47–44 with 2:45 to go in the game when Michigan State called a time out to set up a play. Stevens correctly anticipated the play call and had Ronald Nored, the team's best defender, switch onto Lucious off a screen. Nored stole the ball and Shawn Vanzant got fouled on the resulting run out, hitting 1 of 2. After a Draymond Green jump shot cut the lead to 48–46, Hayward got a layup off an offensive rebound by Willie Veasley. Durrell Summers then got fouled with 1:18 remaining. He hit the first free throw, but missed the second. However, Michigan State got an offensive rebound and Green was fouled. He made both foul shots to bring Michigan State within a point with 56 seconds to go. Butler came up empty on its possession, giving Michigan State a chance to take the lead. Green missed a layup with 8 seconds on the clock and Nored came down with the rebound. He was quickly fouled. Nored, who had shot only 61% on the year and 3 of 12 during the tournament on free throws, hit both shots to give Butler a 52–49 lead. After a Michigan State time out, Butler intentionally fouled Lucious with 2 seconds remaining to prevent a potentially game tying 3-pointer. After making the first, Lucious intentionally missed the second free throw. Hayward came down with the rebound, his ninth of the game, to seal the victory.

Butler won the game despite shooting just 30.6% for the game and going without Howard and Mack for a large portion of the second half. Howard hit his head and left the game dazed, while Mack was experiencing leg cramps. Michigan State coach Tom Izzo called it "one of the more physical games we've been involved in." He added "I like the way they play, I like their story. They play like a Big Ten team." Of 595 games played on neutral courts during the 2009–10 season, Butler's 30.6% was the third-lowest shooting percentage by a winning team. Butler became the first team since the shot clock was adopted for the 1985–86 season to hold five straight tournament opponents under 60 points.

4/5 – Butler vs. #3 (1 seed) Duke (NCAA tournament – Championship Game)

| Teams | 1st Half | 2nd Half | Final |
| BU | 32 | 27 | 59 |
| DUKE | 33 | 28 | 61 |

On April 5, 2010, Butler became the smallest school to play for a National Championship since Jacksonville in 1970, facing Duke, who was seeking its fourth national championship. The New York Times called the game "the most eagerly awaited championship game in years".

Duke jumped out to a 6–1 lead to start the game, but Butler rallied back, taking a 12–11 lead at the 12:28 mark of the first half. At the under eight-minute TV timeout, Butler held a 20–18 lead. After the timeout, Duke went on an 8–0 run to take a 26–20 lead. Coach Stevens then called a timeout. With starters Matt Howard and Ronald Nored on the bench in foul trouble, backup center Avery Jukes hit two three-pointers and a made tip-in en route to 10 first half points, tying his single-game season high. At half time, Duke's lead stood at 33–32.

The second half was played very closely, with neither team taking a lead larger than two points until a Brian Zoubek layup put Duke up 47–43 with 12:27 remaining. Butler stayed within 5 points the rest of the way. With 3:16 to play, Duke took a 60–55 lead on two made free throws by Nolan Smith. Butler missed its next shot, but forced a missed shot and turned Duke over after an offensive rebound. Matt Howard made a layup for Butler to make it a 60–57 game with 1:44 remaining. Smith missed a layup for Duke and Howard made another layup after collecting an offensive rebound on a missed three-pointer by Shelvin Mack. Duke coach Mike Krzyzewski then called a time out. Kyle Singler missed a jump shot from the right corner with 36 seconds remaining, giving Butler a chance to take the lead. Butler was unable to initiate their offense and Stevens called a timeout to set up a play. They were then forced to call their last timeout when they were unable to get the ball in-bounds. Next, Gordon Hayward missed a short fade-away jumper while being defended by center Brian Zoubek. Zoubek came down strong with the rebound, forcing Butler to foul with less than 3.6 seconds remaining. Zoubek made the first foul shot and then intentionally missed the second, likely knowing Butler had no timeouts remaining. Hayward threw a desperation shot from half court. The ball bounced off the backboard and then the rim. According to an analysis by ESPN, Hayward's aim was off by three inches (7.6 cm), or less than one degree, on the x-axis.

The loss ended the winningest season in school history. It also snapped Butler's 25-game winning streak, which was also a school record. The following day President Barack Obama called and congratulated the team, despite the loss. "I just didn't want to call the winner because you guys grabbed the nation's attention. We appreciate the way you guys play." he told the team.
