= 2010 Horizon League men's basketball tournament =

- Classification: Division I
- Season: 2009–10
- Teams: 10
- Site: Hinkle Fieldhouse; Indianapolis, Indiana, U.S.
- Champions: Butler (6th title)
- Winning coach: Brad Stevens (2nd title)
- MVP: Matt Howard (Butler)
- Attendance: 6,065
- Top scorers: Matt Howard (Butler); Shelvin Mack (Butler) (14 points)
- Television: ESPN, ESPNU, ESPN360 and Horizon League Network

2009–10 Horizon League men's basketball standings
	Conf.				Overall
Team	W		L	PCT	W		L	PCT
No. 11 Butler †	18	–	0	1.000	33	–	5	.868
Wright State	12	–	6	.667	20	–	12	.625
Green Bay	11	–	7	.611	22	–	12	.647
Milwaukee	10	–	8	.556	20	–	14	.588
Cleveland State	10	–	8	.556	16	–	17	.485
Valparaiso	10	–	8	.556	15	–	17	.469
Detroit	9	–	9	.500	20	–	14	.588
Loyola Chicago	5	–	13	.278	14	–	16	.467
UIC	3	–	15	.167	8	–	22	.267
Youngstown State	2	–	16	.111	8	–	22	.267
† 2010 Horizon League Tournament winner As of March 18, 2010; Rankings from AP Poll

The 2010 Horizon League men's basketball tournament was played Tuesday, March 2 through Tuesday, March 9. The Horizon League Network broadcast the opening rounds, which were played at the home courts of the higher seeds. The Quarterfinals, Semifinals and Championship games were broadcast by ESPNU and ESPN/ESPN360.com respectively, and took place at the arena of the #1 overall seed, Butler University. The winner received an automatic bid to the 2010 NCAA tournament.

== Seeds ==
All Horizon League schools played in the tournament. Teams were seeded by 2009–10 Horizon League Conference season record, with a tiebreaker system to seed teams with identical conference records. The top 2 teams, Butler and Wright State, received a bye to the Semifinals.

== Schedule ==
Game	Time*	Matchup^{#}	Television
First Round – Tuesday, March 2
1	8pm	#10 Youngstown State at #3 Green Bay	HLN
2	8pm	#7 Detroit at #6 Valparaiso	HLN
3	8pm	#9 UIC at #4 Milwaukee	HLN
4	7pm	#8 Loyola at #5 Cleveland State	HLN
Quarterfinals – Friday, March 5 – Hinkle Fieldhouse
5	6pm	#4 Milwaukee vs #5 Cleveland State	HLN
6	8pm	#3 Green Bay vs #7 Detroit	HLN
Semifinals – Saturday, March 6 – Hinkle Fieldhouse
7	5:15pm	#4 Milwaukee at #1 Butler	ESPNU
8	8pm	#7 Detroit vs #2 Wright State	ESPNU
Championship Game – Tuesday, March 9 – Hinkle Fieldhouse
9	9pm	#2 Wright State at #1 Butler	ESPN/ESPN360.com
*Game Times in ET. #-Rankings denote tournament seeding.

== Bracket ==
First round Tuesday, March 2
4	Milwaukee	73
9	UIC	67
5	Cleveland State	80
8	Loyola Chicago	66
3	Green Bay	81
10	Youngstown State	67
6	Valparaiso	82
7	Detroit	89

Quarterfinals; Friday, March 5
4	Milwaukee	82
5	Cleveland State	75
3	Green Bay	53
7	Detroit	62

Semifinals; Saturday, March 6
1	#12 Butler	68
4	Milwaukee	59
2	Wright State	69
7	Detroit	50

Final; Tuesday, March 9
1	#12 Butler	70
2	Wright State	45

First round games at campus sites of lower-numbered seeds
Second round, semifinals, and championship were hosted by the #1 Overall Seed, Butler.
All times ET.

== Honors ==
Matt Howard of Butler was named the tournament MVP.

Horizon League All-Tournament Team

Player	School	Position	Year
Matt Howard	Butler	Forward	Junior
Shelvin Mack	Butler	Guard	Sophomore
Gordon Hayward	Butler	Guard/Forward	Sophomore
Ronald Nored	Butler	Guard	Sophomore
N’Gai Evans	Wright State	Guard	Junior
