= 2009–10 Wright State Raiders men's basketball team =

American college basketball season

2009–10 Wright State Raiders men's basketball
- Conference: Horizon League
- Record: 20–12 (12–6 Horizon)
- Head coach: Brad Brownell (4th season)
- Associate head coach: Billy Donlon
- Assistant coaches: Mike Winiecki; Victor Ebong
- Home arena: Nutter Center

2009–10 Horizon League men's basketball standings
	Conf.				Overall
Team	W		L	PCT	W		L	PCT
No. 11 Butler †	18	–	0	1.000	33	–	5	.868
Wright State	12	–	6	.667	20	–	12	.625
Green Bay	11	–	7	.611	22	–	12	.647
Milwaukee	10	–	8	.556	20	–	14	.588
Cleveland State	10	–	8	.556	16	–	17	.485
Valparaiso	10	–	8	.556	15	–	17	.469
Detroit	9	–	9	.500	20	–	14	.588
Loyola Chicago	5	–	13	.278	14	–	16	.467
UIC	3	–	15	.167	8	–	22	.267
Youngstown State	2	–	16	.111	8	–	22	.267
† 2010 Horizon League Tournament winner As of March 18, 2010; Rankings from AP Poll

The 2009–10 Wright State Raiders men's basketball team represented Wright State University in the 2009–10 NCAA Division I men's basketball season. The Raiders, led by head coach Brad Brownell, played their home games at the Nutter Center in Dayton, Ohio, as members of the Horizon League.

== Roster ==
2009–10 Wright State Raiders men's basketball team
Players
Coaches

Pos.	#	Name	Height	Weight	Year	Previous school	Hometown
G	4	John David Gardner	6 ft 4 in (1.93 m)	190 lb (86 kg)	Sr	UNC Wilmington	Homewood, AL
F	5	Cory Cooperwood	6 ft 7 in (2.01 m)	225 lb (102 kg)	Sr	Wallace St CC	Kensett, AR
G	21	Todd Brown	6 ft 5 in (1.96 m)	190 lb (86 kg)	Sr	McKinley	Canton, OH
F	40	Ronnie Thomas	6 ft 9 in (2.06 m)	240 lb (109 kg)	So	Northridge	Middlebury, IN
G	3	Troy Tabler	6 ft 3 in (1.91 m)	185 lb (84 kg)	Jr	Moeller	Cincinnati, OH
G	11	N'Gai Evans	6 ft 2 in (1.88 m)	175 lb (79 kg)	Jr	Hoover	North Canton, OH
G	30	Scott Grote	6 ft 6 in (1.98 m)	220 lb (100 kg)	Jr	Centerville	Centerville, OH
G	44	Vaughn Duggins	6 ft 3 in (1.91 m)	195 lb (88 kg)	Jr	Pendleton	Pendleton, IN
F	24	Paul Darkwa	6 ft 7 in (2.01 m)	235 lb (107 kg)	Fr	Romona	Ghana
G	31	Darian Cartharn	6 ft 0 in (1.83 m)	190 lb (86 kg)	Fr	Canal Winchester	Canal Winchester, OH
F	34	Tyler Koch	6 ft 5 in (1.96 m)	210 lb (95 kg)	Fr	Winchester	Winchester, IN

Head coach

- Brad Brownell (DePauw)

Assistant coach(es)

- Billy Donlon (UNC Wilmington)
- Mike Winiecki (Richmond)
- Adrian Townsend (UNC Wilmington)

Legend

- (C) Team captain
- (S) Suspended
- (I) Ineligible
- (W) Walk-on
- Injured
- Current redshirt

== Schedule and results ==
Date time, TV	Rank^{#}	Opponent^{#}	Result	Record	Site city, state
Nov 13, 2009*		at Washington; Athletes in Action Classic	L 69–74	0-1	Hec Edmundson Pavilion (8,239); Seattle, WA
Nov 14, 2009*		vs. Portland St; Athletes in Action Classic	W 75–70	1-1	Hec Edmundson Pavilion (8,410); Seattle, WA
Nov 15, 2009*		vs. Belmont; Athletes in Action Classic	W 82–73	2-1	Hec Edmundson Pavilion (8,236); Seattle, WA
Nov 24, 2009*		Central Michigan	W 69-53	3–1	Nutter Center (5,588); Fairborn, OH
Nov 28, 2009*		at Northeastern	L 67-70	3-2	Matthews Arena (945); Boston, MA
Dec 3, 2009		Cleveland State	W 73-64	4-2 (1–0)	Nutter Center (5,376); Fairborn, OH
Jan 3, 2010		Youngstown State	W 67-54	5-2 (2–0)	Nutter Center (4,072); Fairborn, OH
Dec 8, 2009*		at Toledo	W 66-56	6–2	Savage Arena (4,295); Toledo, OH
Dec 13, 2009*		at Miami Ohio	L 55-56	6-3	Millett Assembly Hall (1,369); Oxford, Ohio
Dec 16, 2009*		at Mississippi St	L 69-80	6-4	Humphrey Coliseum (4,721); Starkville, MS
Dec 19, 2009*		Maryland Eastern Shore	W 87-46	7-4	Nutter Center (4,028); Fairborn, OH
Dec 22, 2009*		Arkansas-Little Rock	W 69-47	8-4	Nutter Center (3,894); Fairborn, OH
Dec 28, 2009*		Sam Houston State	W 88-48	9–4	Nutter Center (4,408); Fairborn, OH
Dec 31, 2009		at Loyola	L 52-53	9-5 (2–1)	Gentile Event Center (1,863); Chicago, IL
Jan 2, 2010		at UIC	W 64-47	10-5 (3-1)	UIC Pavilion (2,838); Chicago, IL
Jan 8, 2010	No. 24	Butler	L 65-77	10–6 (3–2)	Nutter Center (9,674); Fairborn, OH
Jan 10, 2010		Valparaiso	W 59–57	11–6 (4–2)	Nutter Center (4,526); Fairborn, OH
Jan 14, 2010		at Green Bay	L 66-68	11-7 (4–3)	Resch Center (2,793); Ashwaubenon, WI
Jan 16, 2010		at Milwaukee	L 61-67 ^{OT}	11-8 (4–4)	UW–Milwaukee Panther Arena (3,214); Milwaukee, WI
Jan 23, 2010		at Detroit Mercy	W 61–59	12-8 (5-4)	Calihan Hall (4,173); Detroit, MI
Jan 28, 2010		UIC	W 79-43	13-8 (6–4)	Nutter Center (4,539); Fairborn, OH
Jan 30, 2010		Loyola	W 66-48	14-8 (7–4)	Nutter Center (4,746); Fairborn, OH
Feb 4, 2010		at Valparaiso	W 75-71	15–8 (8–4)	Athletics–Recreation Center (2,535); Valparaiso, IN
Feb 6, 2010		at No. 15 Butler	L 62-74	15-9 (8-5)	Hinkle Fieldhouse (8,528); Indianapolis
Feb 11, 2010		Milwaukee	W 68-53	16-9 (9–5)	Nutter Center (4,976); Fairborn, OH
Feb 13, 2010		Green Bay	W 67-54	17-9 (10–5)	Nutter Center (7,923); Fairborn, OH
Feb 17, 2010		Detroit Mercy	W 70–53	18-9 (11-5)	Nutter Center (4,847); Fairborn, OH
Dec 21, 1992*		at Ohio; ESPN Bracketbusters	L 59–64	18–10	Convocation Center (8,164); Athens, Ohio
Feb 25, 2010		at Youngstown State	W 76-73	19-10 (12-5)	Beeghly Center (2,167); Youngstown, OH
Feb 27, 2010		at Cleveland State	L 63-68	19-11 (12–6)	Wolstein Center (3,097); Cleveland, OH
Midwestern Collegiate Tournament
Mar 6, 2010	(2)	vs. (7) Detroit Mercy; Semifinals	W 69-50	20-11	Hinkle Fieldhouse (6,327); Indianapolis
Mar 9, 2010	(2)	at (1) Butler; Final	L 45-70	20–12	Hinkle Fieldhouse (6,065); Indianapolis
*Non-conference game. ^{#}Rankings from AP Poll. (#) Tournament seedings in parentheses. MW=Midwest.

== Awards and honors ==
Vaughn Duggins	Second Team All Horizon League

== Statistics ==
Number	Name	Games	Average	Points	Assists	Rebounds
44	Vaughn Duggins	29	14.2	412	85	91
21	Todd Brown	32	12.6	402	70	141
11	N'Gai Evans	29	9.5	275	93	91
5	Cory Cooperwood	32	9.3	297	28	194
3	Troy Tabler	32	8.9	286	41	58
14	Cooper Land	24	5.5	133	18	70
40	Ronnie Thomas	32	5.3	168	24	82
4	John David Gardner	4	4.0	16	7	1
30	Scott Grote	32	3.2	102	49	96
24	Paul Darkwa	24	1.1	28	1	37
34	Tyler Koch	16	1.1	17	4	10
31	Darian Cartharn	27	1.0	27	13	10
