= 2009–10 Green Bay Phoenix men's basketball team =

American college basketball season

2009–10 Green Bay Phoenix men's basketball

CBI Quarterfinals
- Conference: Horizon League
- Record: 23–13 (11–7 Horizon)
- Head coach: Tod Kowalczyk
- Home arena: Resch Center

2009–10 Horizon League men's basketball standings
	Conf.				Overall
Team	W		L	PCT	W		L	PCT
No. 11 Butler †	18	–	0	1.000	33	–	5	.868
Wright State	12	–	6	.667	20	–	12	.625
Green Bay	11	–	7	.611	22	–	12	.647
Milwaukee	10	–	8	.556	20	–	14	.588
Cleveland State	10	–	8	.556	16	–	17	.485
Valparaiso	10	–	8	.556	15	–	17	.469
Detroit	9	–	9	.500	20	–	14	.588
Loyola Chicago	5	–	13	.278	14	–	16	.467
UIC	3	–	15	.167	8	–	22	.267
Youngstown State	2	–	16	.111	8	–	22	.267
† 2010 Horizon League Tournament winner As of March 18, 2010; Rankings from AP Poll

The 2009–10 Green Bay Phoenix men's basketball team represented the University of Wisconsin–Green Bay in the 2009–10 NCAA Division I men's basketball season. Their head coach was Tod Kowalczyk. The Phoenix played their home games at the Resch Center and were members of the Horizon League. They finished the season 23–13, 11–7 in Horizon League play, losing in the second round of the 2010 Horizon League men's basketball tournament to Detroit and losing in the second round of the 2010 CBI tournament to Saint Louis.

== Roster ==
2009–10 Green Bay Phoenix men's basketball team
Players
Coaches

Pos.	#	Name	Height	Weight	Year	Hometown
G	0	Bryquis Perine	6 ft 3 in (1.91 m)	180 lb (82 kg)	Jr	Milwaukee, Wisconsin
G	3	Derek Semenas	6 ft 3 in (1.91 m)	175 lb (79 kg)	RS Fr	Rosendale, Wisconsin
G	5	Rian Pearson	6 ft 3 in (1.91 m)	190 lb (86 kg)	Fr	Raytown, Missouri
G	10	Troy Cotton	6 ft 1 in (1.85 m)	180 lb (82 kg)	Sr	Milwaukee, Wisconsin
G	11	Jonathan Anderson	5 ft 10 in (1.78 m)	180 lb (82 kg)	Jr	Ashwaubenon, Wisconsin
F	12	Troy Snyder	6 ft 7 in (2.01 m)	212 lb (96 kg)	Fr	Bolingbrook, Illinois
G	20	Rahmon Fletcher	5 ft 10 in (1.78 m)	165 lb (75 kg)	Jr	Kansas City, Missouri
F	23	Randy Berry	6 ft 9 in (2.06 m)	225 lb (102 kg)	RS Sr	Plover, Wisconsin
G	31	Seth Evans	6 ft 0 in (1.83 m)	180 lb (82 kg)	Fr	Seneca, Illinois
F	34	Cordero Barkley	6 ft 5 in (1.96 m)	200 lb (91 kg)	RS Sr	Racine, Wisconsin
F	43	Matt Smith	6 ft 7 in (2.01 m)	200 lb (91 kg)	Fr	Whitewright, Texas
F	44	Greg LeSage	6 ft 8 in (2.03 m)	225 lb (102 kg)	Jr	Radcliff, Kentucky
F	50	Pat Nelson	6 ft 9 in (2.06 m)	240 lb (109 kg)	RS Sr	Rockford, Illinois
F	55	Clayton Heuer	6 ft 9 in (2.06 m)	225 lb (102 kg)	Fr	Wisconsin Rapids, Wisconsin

Head coach

- Tod Kowalczyk (Minnesota Duluth)

Assistant coach(es)

Legend

- (C) Team captain
- (S) Suspended
- (I) Ineligible
- (W) Walk-on
- Injured
- Current redshirt

Roster
Last update: April 22, 2022

== Schedule and results ==
Date time, TV	Rank^{#}	Opponent^{#}	Result	Record	High points	High rebounds	High assists	Site (attendance) city, state
Exhibition
October 31, 2009*; 7:00 pm		Minnesota Dulute	W 77–52	—	20 – Fletcher	7 – Tied	— – —	Resch Center; Green Bay, WI
November 7, 2009*; 7:30 pm		St. Norbert	W 71–54	—	20 – Fletcher	10 – Berry	— – —	Kress Events Center; Green Bay, WI
Regular season
November 13, 2009*; 4:00 pm		vs. UAB; Hispanic College Fund Classic	L 56–68	0–1	14 – Fletcher	4 – Barkley	3 – Cotton	M.A.C. Center (NA); Kent, OH
November 14, 2009*; 4:00 pm		vs. Samford; Hispanic College Fund Classic	W 70–68	1–1	22 – Fletcher	9 – Berry	7 – Perine	M.A.C. Center (NA); Kent, OH
November 15, 2009*; 3:00 pm		at Kent State; Hispanic College Fund Classic	W 87–86 ^{OT}	2–1	25 – Cotton	8 – Barkley	7 – Fletcher	M.A.C. Center (2,571); Kent, OH
November 16, 2009*; 5:00 pm		vs. Rochester (MI); Hispanic College Fund Classic	W 77–51	3–1	19 – Evans	6 – LeSage	5 – Evans	M.A.C. Center (13); Kent, OH
November 18, 2009*; 7:00 pm		Northern Michigan	W 70–64	4–1	19 – Tied	7 – Berry	4 – Fletcher	Resch Center (2,579); Green Bay, WI
November 21, 2009*; 1:00 pm		Long Beach State	L 69–81	4–2	16 – Tied	10 – Berry	6 – Perine	Resch Center (2,978); Green Bay, WI
November 27, 2009*; 7:30 pm		at North Dakota State	W 71–62	5–2	14 – Berry	11 – Berry	3 – Perine	Bison Sports Arena (2,672); Fargo, ND
November 29, 2009*; 4:00 pm		at North Dakota	W 67–41	6–2	22 – Cotton	7 – Tied	6 – Perine	Betty Engelstad Sioux Center (NA); Grand Forks, ND
December 3, 2009; 7:00 pm		Loyola Chicago	W 90–69	7–2 (1–0)	29 – Fletcher	8 – Smith	6 – Perine	Resch Center (2,543); Green Bay, WI
December 5, 2009; 7:00 pm		UIC	W 85–59	8–2 (2–0)	24 – Fletcher	12 – Berry	8 – Perine	Resch Center (3,027); Green Bay, WI
December 9, 2009*; 7:00 pm		No. 20 Wisconsin	W 88–84 ^{OT}	9–2	22 – Perine	12 – Berry	4 – Evans	Resch Center (9,759); Green Bay, WI
December 13, 2009*; 3:30 pm		at Oakland	L 52–76	9–3	12 – Cotton	6 – Tied	3 – Tied	Athletics Center O'rena (2,355); Auburn Hills, MI
December 19, 2009; 2:00 pm		Youngstown State	W 75–67	10–3 (3–0)	28 – Fletcher	11 – Berry	6 – Perine	Resch Center (2,897); Green Bay, WI
December 22, 2009*; 7:00 pm		at Buffalo	L 65–71	10–4	19 – Fletcher	7 – Berry	4 – Fletcher	Resch Center (2,682); Green Bay, WI
December 31, 2009; 6:00 pm, HLN		at No. 23 Butler	L 49–72	10–5 (3–1)	11 – Pearson	4 – Nelson	3 – Perine	Hinkle Fieldhouse (6,754); Indianapolis, IN
January 2, 2010; 7:00 pm		at Valparaiso	W 64–58	11–5 (4–1)	16 – Perine	10 – Berry	2 – Pearson	Athletics–Recreation Center (2,762); Valparaiso, IN
January 9, 2010; 1:00 pm		at Milwaukee	L 51–71	11–6 (4–2)	15 – Perine	6 – Perine	4 – Perine	U.S. Cellular Arena (4,032); Milwaukee, WI
January 14, 2010; 7:00 pm		Wright State	W 68–66	12–6 (5–2)	18 – Fletcher	10 – Berry	3 – Fletcher	Resch Center (2,793); Green Bay, WI
January 16, 2010; 7:00 pm		Detroit	W 74–72	13–6 (6–2)	24 – Fletcher	11 – Berry	8 – Perine	Resch Center (4,237); Green Bay, WI
January 19, 2010*; 7:30 pm		at Houston Baptist	W 77–66	14–6	26 – Perine	10 – Berry	8 – Perine	Sharp Gymnasium (411); Houston, TX
January 22, 2010; 6:00 pm		at Cleveland State	L 50–64	14–7 (6–3)	14 – Pearson	11 – Berry	4 – Perine	Wolstein Center (2,112); Cleveland, OH
January 24, 2010; 1:00 pm		at Youngstown State	W 69–55	15–7 (7–3)	23 – Cotton	9 – Berry	6 – Perine	Beeghly Center (1,670); Youngstown, OH
January 29, 2010; 8:00 pm		No. 18 Butler	L 57–75	15–8 (7–4)	24 – Fletcher	6 – Berry	3 – Fletcher	Resch Center (6,237); Green Bay, WI
January 31, 2010; 1:00 pm		Valparaiso	L 79–84	15–9 (7–5)	20 – Cotton	9 – Berry	5 – Perine	Resch Center (4,081); Green Bay, WI
February 6, 2010; 7:00 pm		Milwaukee	W 61–54	16–9 (8–5)	13 – Tied	13 – Berry	5 – Perine	Resch Center (5,481); Green Bay, WI
February 11, 2010; 6:00 pm		at Detroit	W 64–62	17–9 (9–5)	16 – Fletcher	9 – Nelson	5 – Fletcher	Calihan Hall (1,574); Detroit, MI
February 13, 2010; 6:00 pm		at Wright State	L 54–67	17–10 (9–6)	14 – Fletcher	7 – Berry	5 – Fletcher	Ervin J. Nutter Center (7,923); Dayton, OH
February 16, 2010; 6:00 pm		Cleveland State	W 74–57	18–10 (10–6)	19 – Berry	11 – Berry	5 – Perine	Resch Center (3,158); Green Bay, WI
February 20, 2010*; 7:00 pm		Indiana State	W 60–59	19–10	22 – Fletcher	9 – Berry	4 – Fletcher	Resch Center (3,395); Green Bay, WI
February 25, 2010; 7:00 pm		at UIC	L 71–78	19–11 (10–7)	17 – Fletcher	8 – Pearson	5 – Perine	UIC Pavilion (3,265); Chicago, IL
February 27, 2010; 2:00 pm		at Loyola Chicago	W 87–71	20–11 (11–7)	23 – Fletcher	10 – Berry	6 – Tied	Joseph J. Gentile Center (2,617); Chicago, IL
Horizon League tournament
March 2, 2010; 7:00 pm, HLN	(3)	(10) Youngstown State; Horizon First Round	W 81–67	21–11	21 – Perine	12 – Berry	7 – Perine	Resch Center (1,860); Green Bay, WI
March 2, 2010; 5:00 pm, HLN	(3)	vs. (7) Detroit; Horizon Quarterfinals	L 53–62	21–12	22 – Perine	8 – Berry	2 – Perine	Hinkle Fieldhouse (NA); Indianapolis, IN
CBI
March 17, 2010*; 6:00 pm		at Akron; CBI First Round	W 70–66	22–12	36 – Cotton	7 – Tied	5 – Perine	James A. Rhodes Arena (877); Akron, OH
March 22, 2010*; 8:00 pm		at Saint Louis; CBI Quarterfinals	L 62–68 ^{2OT}	22–13	17 – Cotton	7 – Berry	4 – Perine	Chaifetz Arena (4,235); St. Louis, MO
*Non-conference game. ^{#}Rankings from AP Poll. (#) Tournament seedings in parentheses. All times are in Central Time.
