= 2009–10 Cleveland State Vikings men's basketball team =

American college basketball season

2009–10 Cleveland State Vikings men's basketball
- Conference: Horizon League
- Record: 16–17 (10–8 Horizon League)
- Head coach: Gary Waters
- Assistant coaches: Jayson Gee; Larry DeSimpelare; Jermaine Kimbrough
- Home arena: Wolstein Center

2009–10 Horizon League men's basketball standings
	Conf.				Overall
Team	W		L	PCT	W		L	PCT
No. 11 Butler †	18	–	0	1.000	33	–	5	.868
Wright State	12	–	6	.667	20	–	12	.625
Green Bay	11	–	7	.611	22	–	12	.647
Milwaukee	10	–	8	.556	20	–	14	.588
Cleveland State	10	–	8	.556	16	–	17	.485
Valparaiso	10	–	8	.556	15	–	17	.469
Detroit	9	–	9	.500	20	–	14	.588
Loyola Chicago	5	–	13	.278	14	–	16	.467
UIC	3	–	15	.167	8	–	22	.267
Youngstown State	2	–	16	.111	8	–	22	.267
† 2010 Horizon League Tournament winner As of March 18, 2010; Rankings from AP Poll

The 2009–10 Cleveland State Vikings men's basketball team represented Cleveland State University in the 2009-10 NCAA Division I men's basketball season. The team was led by fourth-year head coach Gary Waters and played their home games at the Wolstein Center. They finished the season 16–17, 10–8 in Horizon League play. The Vikngs lost in the quarterfinals of the Horizon League tournament to Milwaukee. It was the 79th season of Cleveland State basketball.

== Roster ==
Note: Flags indicate national team eligibility at FIBA sanctioned events. Players may hold other non-FIBA nationality not displayed.

No.		Position	Player
3	(United States)	G	Trevon Harmon
5	(United States)	G	Jeremy Montgomery
20	(United States)	F	Charlie Woods
22	(United States)	G	Josh McCoy
23	(United States)	F	Daitwan Eppinger
30	(United States)	G	Norris Cole

No.		Position	Player
32	(United States)	G	D'Aundray Brown
33	(United States)	F	Tim Kamczyc
44	(United States)	F	Aaron Pogue
50	(United States)	F	Ethan Anderson
51	(United States)	C	Joe Latas

== Schedule ==
Horizon League Standing: 2nd
**Date**	**Opponent***	**Rank***	**Location**	**Time**^{#}	Result	**Overall**	**Conference**
**Exhibition Game**
November 9, 2009	John Carroll		Cleveland	7:00 p.m.	W 92–75	1–0	
**Regular Season Games**
November 13, 2009	St. Bonaventure		Olean, New York	7:00 p.m.	L 72–62	0–1	
November 16, 2009	Wilmington		Cleveland	11:30 a.m.	W 99–74	1–1	
November 19, 2009	Florida A&M		Cleveland	7:00 p.m.	W 78–64	2–1	
November 21, 2009	Sam Houston State		Cleveland	7:00 p.m.	W 80–65	3–1	
November 24, 2009	#5 Kentucky		Cancún, Mexico	4:30 p.m.	L 73–49	3–2	
November 25, 2009	Virginia		Cancun, Mexico	8:00 p.m.	L 76–65	3–3	
November 28, 2009	Wichita State		Cleveland	2:00 p.m.	L 69–54	3–4	
December 3, 2009	**Wright State**		Fairborn, Ohio	9:00 p.m.	L 73–64	3–5	0–1
December 5, 2009	**Detroit Mercy**		Detroit	1:00 p.m.	L 69–62	3–6	0–2
December 12, 2009	Wilberforce		Cleveland, OH	2:00 p.m.	W 113–61	4–6	0–2
December 15, 2009	Robert Morris		Cleveland	7:00 p.m.	L 78–70	4–7	0–2
December 19, 2009	#6 West Virginia		Cleveland	2:00 p.m.	L 80–78	4–8	0–2
December 22, 2009	#17 Ohio State		Columbus, Ohio	8:30 p.m.	L 72–59	4–9	0–2
December 29, 2009	#12 Kansas State		Manhattan, Kansas	8:00 p.m.	L 85–56	4–10	0–2
January 2, 2010	**Youngstown State**		Youngstown, Ohio	7:05 p.m.	W 70–48	5–10	1–2
January 7, 2010	**Loyola Chicago**		Cleveland	7:00 p.m.	W 62–57	6–10	2–2
January 9, 2010	**Illinois Chicago**		Cleveland	5:30 p.m.	W 70–63	7–10	3–2
January 14, 2010	#22 **Butler**		Indianapolis	7:00 p.m.	L 64–55	7–11	3–3
January 16, 2010	**Valparaiso**		Valparaiso, Indiana	8:05 p.m.	L 78–71	7–12	3–4
January 22, 2010	**UW–Green Bay**		Cleveland	7:30 p.m.	W 64–50	8–12	4–4
January 24, 2010	**UW–Milwaukee**		Cleveland	2:00 p.m.	W 73–72	9–12	5–4
January 30, 2010	**Youngstown State**		Cleveland	4:00 p.m.	W 77–69	10–12	6–4
February 4, 2010	**Illinois Chicago**		Chicago	8:00 p.m.	W 74–63	11–12	7–4
February 6, 2010	**Loyola Chicago**		Chicago	4:00 p.m.	W 59–56	12–12	8–4
February 11, 2010	**Valparaiso**		Cleveland	7:00 p.m.	W 80–71	13–12	9–4
February 13, 2010	#15 **Butler**		Cleveland	2:00 p.m.	L 70–59	13–13	9–5
February 16, 2010	**UW–Green Bay**		Green Bay, Wisconsin	8:00 p.m.	L 74–57	13–14	9–6
February 18, 2010	**UW–Milwaukee**		Milwaukee	8:30 p.m.	L 69–59	13–15	9–7
February 20, 2009	Toledo		Cleveland	6:00 p.m.	W 87–63	14–15	9–7
February 25, 2010	**Detroit Mercy**		Cleveland	7:30 p.m.	L 65–54	14–16	9–8
February 27, 2010	**Wright State**		Cleveland	2:00 p.m.	W 68–63	15–16	10–8
**Horizon League tournament**
March 2, 2010	**Loyola Chicago**		Cleveland	7:00 p.m.	W 80–66	16–16	
March 5, 2010	**UW–Milwaukee**		Indianapolis	7:00 p.m.	L 82–75	16–17	
*Rank according to AP Top 25 Poll. ^{#}All times are in Eastern. Conference games in **bold**.
