= 2009–10 Milwaukee Panthers men's basketball team =

American college basketball season

2009–10 Milwaukee Panthers men's basketball
- Conference: Horizon League
- Record: 20–14 (10–8 Horizon League)
- Head coach: Rob Jeter (5th season)
- Assistant coaches: Duffy Conroy (6th season); Chad Boudreau (5th season); Brian Bidlingmyer
- Home arena: US Cellular Arena

2009–10 Horizon League men's basketball standings
	Conf.				Overall
Team	W		L	PCT	W		L	PCT
No. 11 Butler †	18	–	0	1.000	33	–	5	.868
Wright State	12	–	6	.667	20	–	12	.625
Green Bay	11	–	7	.611	22	–	12	.647
Milwaukee	10	–	8	.556	20	–	14	.588
Cleveland State	10	–	8	.556	16	–	17	.485
Valparaiso	10	–	8	.556	15	–	17	.469
Detroit	9	–	9	.500	20	–	14	.588
Loyola Chicago	5	–	13	.278	14	–	16	.467
UIC	3	–	15	.167	8	–	22	.267
Youngstown State	2	–	16	.111	8	–	22	.267
† 2010 Horizon League Tournament winner As of March 18, 2010; Rankings from AP Poll

The 2009–10 Milwaukee Panthers men's basketball team represented the University of Wisconsin–Milwaukee during the 2009–10 college basketball season. They were led by head coach Rob Jeter. The Panthers competed in the Horizon League and played their home games at US Cellular Arena. They finished the season 20–14, 10–8 in Horizon play and lost in the semifinals of the 2010 Horizon League men's basketball tournament.

== Recruits ==
The following is a list of commitments Milwaukee received for the 2009-2010 season:

- Ja'Rob McCallum (Guard)
- Lonnie Boga (Guard)
- Michael Tyler (Forward)
- Quinton Gustavson (Forward)
- Mitchell Carter (Center)
- Christian Wolf (Forward)

== Roster ==
#	Name	Height	Weight (lbs.)	Position	Class	Hometown	Previous Team(s)
1	Ja'Rob McCallum	6'0"	170	G	Fr.	Marion, IN, U.S.	Marion HS
2	Deonte Roberts	6'3"	190	G	Jr.	St. Paul, MN, U.S.	St. Bernard's HS
3	Riley Walker	6'6"	210	F	Fr.	McFarland, WI, U.S.	McFarland HS
5	Ricky Franklin	6'1"	200	G	Sr.	Milwaukee, WI, U.S.	Riverside HS
11	Tone Boyle	6'3"	185	G	Sr.	Middleton, WI, U.S.	Middleton HS
15	Patrick Souter	6'0"	170	G	Fr.	Racine, WI, U.S.	St. Catherine's HS
21	Tony Meier	6'8"	210	F	So.	Wildwood, MO, U.S.	Lafayette HS
22	Michael Tyler	6'5"	230	F	Jr.	Milwaukee, WI, U.S.	Kilmer South HS
23	Anthony Hill	6'7"	230	F	Jr.	Milwaukee, WI, U.S.	Bradley Tech HS
30	Jerard Ajami	6'2"	180	G	Jr.	Madison, WI, U.S.	Madison Memorial HS
32	Lonnie Boga	6'3"	200	G	Fr.	St. Louis, MO, U.S.	McCluer HS
33	Quinton Gustavson	6'9"	200	F	Fr.	Racine, WI, U.S.	Case HS
34	Mitchell Carter	6'10"	270	C	Sr.	Milwaukee, WI, U.S.	Rufus King HS
42	Burleigh Porte	6'8"	210	F	Sr.	Monrovia, Liberia	Olney Central CC
44	Ryan Haggerty	6'8"	210	F	Fr.	Glen Ellyn, IL, U.S.	Benet Academy
45	Christian Wolf	6'8"	250	F	So.	Kohler, WI, U.S.	Kohler HS
52	Jason Averkamp	6'6"	230	F	Sr.	New Berlin, WI, U.S.	New Berlin West HS
55	James Eayrs	6'7"	310	F	Sr.	Roseville, MN, U.S.	Roseville HS

=== Coaching staff ===
Name	Type	College
Rob Jeter	Head coach	University of Wisconsin–Platteville
Brian Bidlingmyer	Assistant coach	Siena College
Chad Boudreau	Assistant coach	Hannibal-LaGrange College
Duffy Conroy	Assistant coach	St. Ambrose University
Ronnie Jones	Director of Basketball Operations	University of Wisconsin–Milwaukee
Chip MacKenzie	Video Coordinator	Edgewood College
Dave Bugalski	Athletic trainer	University of Wisconsin–Milwaukee

== Schedule ==
Horizon League Standing: 4th
Date	Opponent*	Location	Television	Result	Record
**Regular Season Games**
November 13, 2009	Concordia University, Saint Paul	Milwaukee, WI		W 89–73	1–0
November 16, 2009	Western Kentucky (NIT Season Tip-Off)	Baton Rouge, LA		L 69–65	1–1
November 17, 2009	Indiana State (NIT Season Tip-Off)	Baton Rouge, LA		L 76–63	1–2
November 21, 2009	Hillsdale	Milwaukee, WI		W 62–54	2–2
November 23, 2009	Texas State (NIT Season Tip-Off)	Fort Worth, TX		W 96–77	3–2
November 24, 2009	Colgate (NIT Season Tip-Off)	Fort Worth, TX		W 69–60	4–2
November 28, 2009	Bowling Green	Bowling Green, OH		W 90–83	5–2
December 3, 2009	**UI–Chicago**	Milwaukee, WI	Sports 32	W 57–52	6–2 (1–0)
December 5, 2009	**Loyola–Chicago**	Milwaukee, WI		L 69–64	6-3 (1–1)
December 8, 2009	Marquette	Bradley Center	Sports 32	L 71–51	6–4
December 12, 2009	North Dakota State	Fargo, ND		W 84–73	7–4
December 19, 2009	Miami (OH)	Milwaukee, WI		W 68–61	8–4
December 23, 2009	Wisconsin	Madison, WI	Big Ten Network	L 68–58	8–5
December 31, 2009	**Valparaiso**	Valparaiso, IN	Sports 32	L 55–54	8–6 (1–2)
January 2, 2010	**#23 Butler**	Indianapolis, IN	Sports 32/Horizon League Network	L 80–67	8–7 (1–3)
January 5, 2010	SIU-Edwardsville	Edwardsville, IL		W 83–73	9–7
January 9, 2010	**UW–Green Bay**	Milwaukee, WI	Sports 32/Horizon League Network	W 71–51	10–7 (2–3)
January 14, 2010	**Detroit**	Milwaukee, WI	Sports 32	L 81–65	10–8 (2–4)
January 16, 2010	**Wright State**	Milwaukee, WI	Sports 32	W 67–61	11–8 (3–4)
January 22, 2010	**Youngstown State**	Youngstown, OH	ESPNU	W 69–59	12–8 (4–4)
January 24, 2010	**Cleveland State**	Cleveland, OH	Sports 32	L 73–72	12–9 (4–5)
January 29, 2010	**Valparaiso**	Milwaukee, WI		W 85–82	13–9 (5–5)
January 31, 2010	**#18 Butler**	Milwaukee, WI	Sports 32	L 73–66	13–10 (5–6)
February 6, 2010	**UW–Green Bay**	Green Bay, WI		L 61–54	13–11 (5–7)
February 11, 2010	**Wright State**	Dayton, OH	Sports 32	L 68–63	13–12 (5–8)
February 13, 2010	**Detroit**	Detroit, MI		W 71–60	14–12 (6–8)
February 15, 2010	**Youngstown State**	Milwaukee, WI		W 64–62	15–12 (7–8)
February 18, 2010	**Cleveland State**	Milwaukee, WI	Sports 32	W 69–59	16–12 (8–8)
February 20, 2010	Niagara	Milwaukee, WI		W 85–79	16–13
February 25, 2010	**Loyola–Chicago**	Chicago, IL	Sports 32	W 63–61	17–13 (9–8)
February 27, 2010	**UI–Chicago**	Chicago, IL	Sports 32	W 78–74	18–13 (10–8)
**Horizon League tournament**
March 2, 2010	**UI–Chicago**	Milwaukee, WI	Horizon League Network	W 73–67	19–13
March 5, 2010	**Cleveland State**	Indianapolis, IN	Horizon League Network	W 82–75	20–13
March 6, 2010	**#11 Butler**	Indianapolis, IN	ESPNU	L 68–59	20–14
*Rank according to AP Top 25 Poll. ^{#}All times are in Eastern. Conference games in **bold**.
