= 2009–10 Valparaiso Crusaders men's basketball team =

American college basketball season

2009–10 Valparaiso Crusaders men's basketball
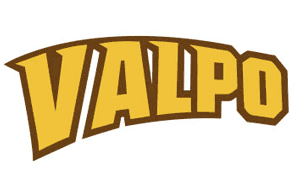
- Conference: Horizon League
- Record: 15–17 (10–8 Horizon)
- Head coach: Homer Drew
- Assistant coaches: Bryce Drew; Luke Gore; Chris Sparks
- Home arena: Athletics-Recreation Center

2009–10 Horizon League men's basketball standings
	Conf.				Overall
Team	W		L	PCT	W		L	PCT
No. 11 Butler †	18	–	0	1.000	33	–	5	.868
Wright State	12	–	6	.667	20	–	12	.625
Green Bay	11	–	7	.611	22	–	12	.647
Milwaukee	10	–	8	.556	20	–	14	.588
Cleveland State	10	–	8	.556	16	–	17	.485
Valparaiso	10	–	8	.556	15	–	17	.469
Detroit	9	–	9	.500	20	–	14	.588
Loyola Chicago	5	–	13	.278	14	–	16	.467
UIC	3	–	15	.167	8	–	22	.267
Youngstown State	2	–	16	.111	8	–	22	.267
† 2010 Horizon League Tournament winner As of March 18, 2010; Rankings from AP Poll

The 2009–10 Valparaiso Crusaders men's basketball team was an NCAA Division I college basketball team who competed in the Horizon League representing Valparaiso University. The Crusaders finished the season 15–17, 10–8 in Horizon League play and lost in the first round of the 2010 Horizon League men's basketball tournament to Detroit.

== Coaching staff ==
- Homer Drew - Head coach
- Bryce Drew - Associate head coach
- Luke Gore - Assistant coach
- Chris Sparks - Assistant coach

== Schedule ==
Date time, TV	Rank^{#}	Opponent^{#}	Result	Record	Site city, state
Exhibition
11/01/09*; 4:00pm		Indianapolis	L 83–88	—	Athletics–Recreation Center; Valparaiso, IN
Regular season
11/13/09*; 6:00pm		at Ball State	L 78–88	0–1	Worthen Arena (4,175); Muncie, IN
11/15/09*; 3:00pm, Fox Sports South		at No. 6 North Carolina	L 77–88	0–2	Smith Center (17,020); Chapel Hill, NC
11/19/09*; 7:05pm		IU South Bend	W 78–56	1–2	Athletics-Recreation Center (2,468); Valparaiso, IN
11/22/09*; 11:00am, Big Ten Network		at No. 2 Michigan State; Legends Classic	L 60–90	1–3	Breslin Center (14,759); East Lansing, MI
11/27/09*; 6:30pm		at Georgia Southern; Legends Classic	W 97–89	2–3	Hanner Fieldhouse (1,587); Statesboro, GA
11/28/09*; 2:00pm		vs. Troy; Legends Classic	L 64–80	2–4	Hanner Fieldhouse (598); Statesboro, GA
11/29/09*; 12:00pm		vs. Arkansas–Fort Smith; Legends Classic	W 86–74	3–4	Hanner Fieldhouse (564); Statesboro, GA
12/05/09; 6:00pm, WNDY		at No. 23 Butler	L 67–84	3–5 (0–1)	Hinkle Fieldhouse (6,125); Indianapolis, IN
12/09/09*; 6:00pm, Big Ten Network		at No. 5 Purdue	L 62–86	3–6	Mackey Arena (14,034); West Lafayette, IN
12/12/09*; 2:00pm, WYIN		Toledo	W 81–49	4–6	Athletics-Recreation Center (3,278); Valparaiso, IN
12/19/09*; 7:05pm		Concordia (WI)	W 83–57	5–6	Athletics-Recreation Center (2,423); Valparaiso, IN
12/22/09*; 6:00pm		at IPFW	L 72–75	5–7	Allen County War Memorial Coliseum (1,891); Fort Wayne, IN
12/27/09*; 1:00pm		at Akron	L 57–77	5–8	James A. Rhodes Arena (2,825); Akron, OH
12/31/09; 7:05pm		Milwaukee	W 55–54	6–8 (1–1)	Athletics-Recreation Center (2,388); Valparaiso, IN
01/02/10; 7:05pm, WYIN/WACY		Green Bay	L 58–64	6–9 (1–2)	Athletics-Recreation Center (2,762); Valparaiso, IN
01/08/10; 6:00pm, ESPNU		at Detroit	L 67–77	6–10 (1–3)	Calihan Hall (2,277); Detroit, MI
01/10/10; 3:00pm		at Wright State	L 57–59	6–11 (1–4)	Nutter Center (4,526); Dayton, OH
01/14/10; 7:05pm		Youngstown State	W 70–66	7–11 (2–4)	Athletics-Recreation Center (2,489); Valparaiso, IN
01/16/10; 1:00pm		Cleveland State	W 78–71	8–11 (3–4)	Athletics-Recreation Center (2,377); Valparaiso, IN
01/21/10; 7:00pm		at UIC	W 64–58	9–11 (4–4)	UIC Pavilion (3,475); Chicago, IL
01/23/10; 3:00pm, WYIN		at Loyola Chicago	W 86–67	10–11 (5–4)	Joseph J. Gentile Center (3,725); Chicago, IL
01/29/10; 7:00pm		at Milwaukee	L 82–85	10–12 (5–5)	U.S. Cellular Arena (3,127); Milwaukee, WI
01/31/10; 1:00pm, WACY		at Green Bay	W 84–79	11–12 (6–5)	Resch Center (4,081); Green Bay, WI
02/04/10; 7:05pm		Wright State	L 71–75	11–13 (6–6)	Athletics-Recreation Center (2,535); Valparaiso, IN
02/06/10; 1:00pm		Detroit	W 74–70	12–13 (7–6)	Athletics-Recreation Center (3,654); Valparaiso, IN
02/08/10; 7:05pm, WYIN		UIC	W 83–82	13–13 (8–6)	Athletics-Recreation Center (2,442); Valparaiso, IN
02/11/10; 6:00pm		at Cleveland State	L 71–80	13–14 (8–7)	Wolstein Center (1,492); Cleveland, OH
02/13/10; 6:05pm, MY-YTV		at Youngstown State	W 77–75	14–14 (9–7)	Beeghly Center (1,762); Youngstown, OH
02/17/10; 7:05pm, WYIN		Loyola Chicago	W 84–73	15–14 (10–7)	Athletics-Recreation Center (2,269); Valparaiso, IN
02/20/10*; 1:00pm		at Bowling Green	L 70–87	15–15	Anderson Arena (1,872); Bowling Green, OH
02/26/10; 8:00pm, ESPNU		Butler	L 69–74	15–16 (10–8)	Athletics-Recreation Center (5,266); Valparaiso, IN
Horizon League tournament
03/02/10; 7:00pm	(6)	(7) Detroit; First Round	L 82–89	15–17	Athletics-Recreation Center (1,255); Valparaiso, IN
*Non-conference game. ^{#}Rankings from Coaches' Poll. (#) Tournament seedings in parentheses. All times are in Central Time.
