= Elite Scholar-Athlete Award =

Elite Schoiar-Athlete Award
- Awarded for: Participating student athlete with highest GPA at each of the 92 NCAA Championship sites.
- Country: United States
- Presented by: National Collegiate Athletic Association
- First award: 2009–10
- Currently held by: 92 annually
- Website: www.ncaa.com/elite-scholar-athlete-award

The Elite Scholar-Athlete Award, most recently renamed in 2025 from Elite 90 Award (originally the Elite 88 Award and later the Elite 89 Award), is an award by the National Collegiate Athletic Association (NCAA) recognizing the student athlete with the highest cumulative grade-point average who has reached the competition at the finals site for each of the NCAA's 92 men's and women's championships across its three divisions (Division I, Division II, Division III). With women's wrestling becoming an official NCAA championship sport for the first time in 2025–26, initially with a single championship open to members of all three divisions, as well as the coeducational fencing championship splitting into separate men's and women's team championships in 2025–26, the NCAA changed the name of the award to the current version, presumably to prevent future name changes resulting from the addition or removal of NCAA championship events.

Students are eligible if they have achieved at least a sophomore in academic and athletic standing and if they are in at least the second year of competition (in any sport) at their current institution. A student in the first season of play at a new institution is eligible for the award if they sat out the previous season due to NCAA transfer rules while enrolled continuously at the current institution. The student athlete must be on the active roster, and in sports that have limits on squad size, they must be a member of the designated squad size at the championship site. Grade point averages are determined using a straight grading scale to ensure consistency among institutions. Additionally, only credits earned at the student's current institution are counted towards determining GPA; transfer and AP credits are specifically excluded. Graduate students who still have athletic eligibility may receive the award, but only undergraduate GPAs are considered. In the event of a tie, completed credits are the official tiebreaker. In sports such as golf and cross country running an individual who qualifies for the individual championship although their team is not competing will be eligible for the award. Multi-sport athletes are only allowed to win one award per academic year, even if they qualify for the award in more than one sport.

The award was established as the Elite 88 Award during the 2009–10 academic year. It became the Elite 89 during the 2011–12 academic year with the creation of the NCAA Men's Division III Volleyball Championship, and changed again to Elite 90 in 2015–16 with the establishment of the NCAA Beach Volleyball Championship. The NCAA owns the trademark to the terms "Elite 89", "Elite 90", and "Elite Scholar-Athlete".

Two groups of NCAA student-athletes are not eligible for the Elite Scholar-Athlete Award:

- Participants in what the NCAA classifies as "emerging sports" for women, currently equestrianism, flag football, rugby union, and triathlon. These sports are recognized by the NCAA, but do not yet have fully sanctioned status. Beach volleyball had been an "emerging sport" before becoming a fully sanctioned championship sport in 2015–16, and wrestling had also been one before graduating to full championship status in January 2025, with the first championship in 2025–26. Acrobatics & tumbling and stunt graduated from the Emerging Sports program to full championship status in January 2026, with the first championships to take place in 2026–27.
- Players in Division I FBS football. The NCAA has never sponsored an official FBS national championship.

NCAA Elite Scholar-Athlete Eligible Sports

Notes

- "National Collegiate" is the official NCAA designation for championships that are open to schools from multiple NCAA divisions. In most cases, the National Collegiate Championship is the only championship awarded in that sport. However, two sports—women's ice hockey and men's volleyball—have National Collegiate and Division III championships. By contrast, the men's ice hockey championships are designated as "Division I" and "Division III", although Division II schools can and do compete in that sport's Division I championship as Division I members.
- The list includes only championships in fully sanctioned NCAA sports. Two divisional championships in current National Collegiate sports will be established in 2027–28; those are indicated in italics.

Season	Division I	Division II	Division III	National Collegiate
Fall	Field Hockey; Men's Cross Country; Women's Cross Country; Men's Soccer; Women's Soccer; Women's Volleyball; Football (FCS only)	Field Hockey; Men's Cross Country; Women's Cross Country; Men's Soccer; Women's Soccer; Women's Volleyball; Football	Field Hockey; Men's Cross Country; Women's Cross Country; Men's Soccer; Women's Soccer; Women's Volleyball; Football	Men's Water Polo
Winter	Men's Indoor Track & Field; Women's Indoor Track & Field; Men's Wrestling; Men's Swimming and Diving; Women's Swimming and Diving; Men's Ice Hockey; Men's Basketball; Women's Basketball	Men's Indoor Track & Field; Women's Indoor Track & Field; Men's Wrestling; Men's Swimming and Diving; Women's Swimming and Diving; Men's Basketball; Women's Basketball; Women's Bowling (from 2027–28)	Men's Indoor Track & Field; Women's Indoor Track & Field; Men's Wrestling; Men's Swimming and Diving; Women's Swimming and Diving; Men's Ice Hockey; Women's Ice Hockey; Men's Basketball; Women's Basketball; Women's Wrestling (from 2027–28)	Women's Bowling; Men's Fencing; Women's Fencing; Men's Gymnastics; Women's Gymnastics; Women's Ice Hockey; Rifle (team sport open to both sexes); Skiing (coeducational team sport); Women's Wrestling
Spring	Baseball (men only); Men's Golf; Women's Golf; Men's Lacrosse; Women's Lacrosse; Men's Outdoor Track & Field; Women's Outdoor Track & Field; Rowing (women only); Softball (women only); Men's Tennis; Women's Tennis	Baseball (men only); Men's Golf; Women's Golf; Men's Lacrosse; Women's Lacrosse; Men's Outdoor Track & Field; Women's Outdoor Track & Field; Rowing (women only); Softball (women only); Men's Tennis; Women's Tennis	Baseball (men only); Men's Golf; Women's Golf; Men's Lacrosse; Women's Lacrosse; Men's Outdoor Track & Field; Women's Outdoor Track & Field; Rowing (women only); Softball (women only); Men's Tennis; Women's Tennis; Men's Volleyball	Women's Beach Volleyball; Men's Volleyball; Women's Water Polo
