= Matt Howard =

American professional basketball player (born 1989)

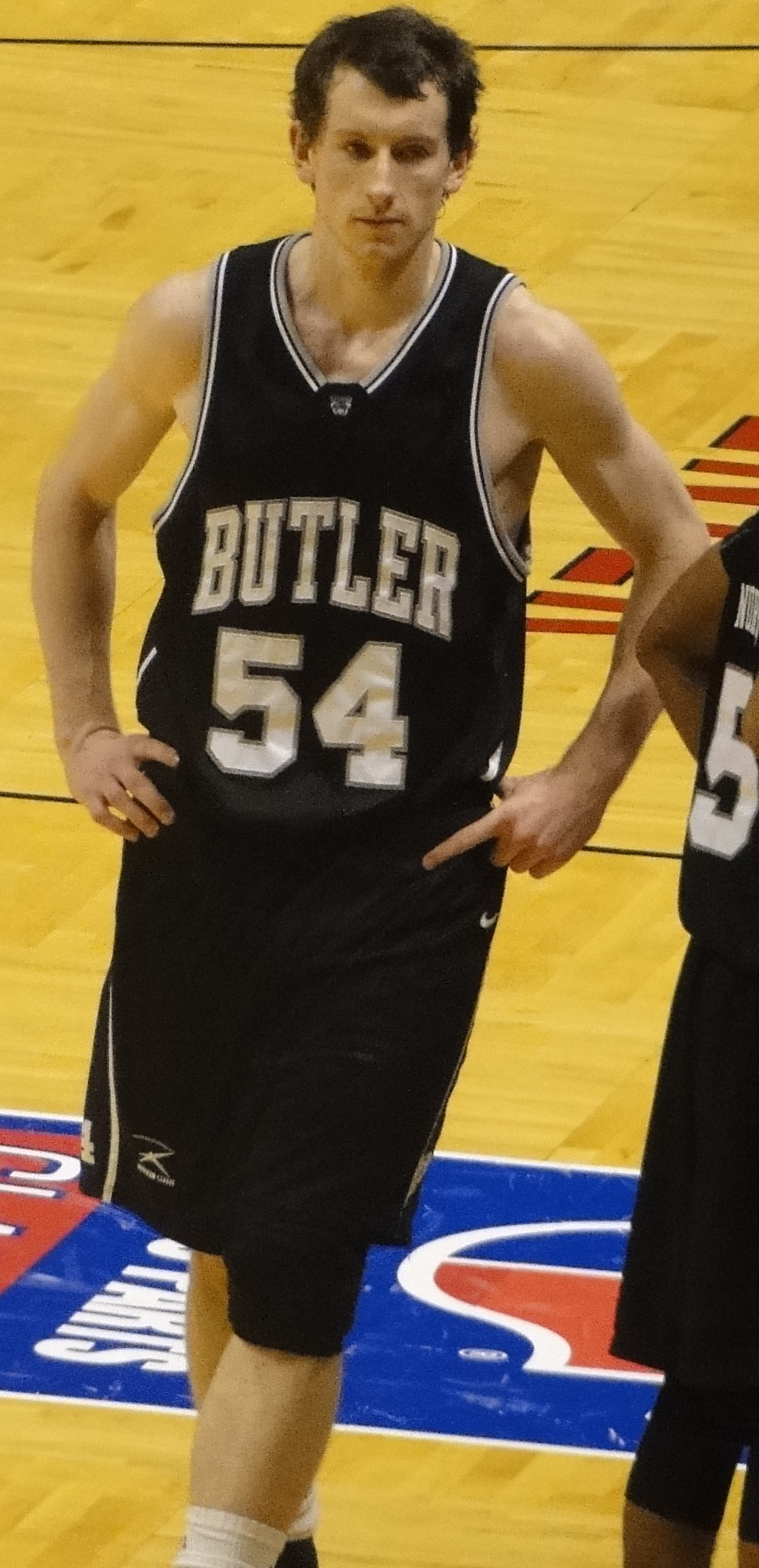

Personal information
- Born: January 23, 1989 (age 37) Connersville, Indiana, U.S.
- Listed height: 6 ft 8 in (2.03 m)
- Listed weight: 230 lb (104 kg)

Career information
- High school: Connersville (Connersville, Indiana)
- College: Butler (2007–2011)
- NBA draft: 2011: undrafted
- Playing career: 2011–2018
- Position: Power forward

Career history
- 2011–2012: Olympiacos
- 2012: EnBW Ludwigsburg
- 2012–2013: Chorale Roanne Basket
- 2013–2014: ratiopharm Ulm
- 2014–2017: Strasbourg IG
- 2017–2018: Hapoel Tel Aviv

Career highlights
- Pro A Sixth Man of the Year (2016); Lou Henson Award (2011); AP Honorable mention All-American (2009); Horizon League Player of the Year (2009); Academic All-America of the Year (2011); 3× Academic All-American (2009–2011); 2× Horizon League tournament MVP (2010, 2011); 2× Elite 88 Award (2010, 2011)

Matt Howard (born January 23, 1989) is an American former professional basketball player who last played for Hapoel Tel Aviv of the Israeli Premier League. Previously, he played college basketball with the Butler Bulldogs. He helped lead the 2009–10 and 2010–11 Butler Bulldogs men's basketball teams to the championship game of the NCAA tournament.

He is a three-time Academic All-American and the 2011 Men's Basketball Academic All-America of the Year as well as the 2009 Horizon League Men's Basketball Player of the Year. He was a 2009 All-American honorable mention by the Associated Press. He was the 2010 and 2011 Horizon League men's basketball tournament MVP as well as a four-time Horizon League men's basketball tournament All-Tournament selection. He won the 2011 Lou Henson Award as well as the 2010 & 2011 Elite 88 Awards. (Note: Now known as the Elite 90 Award. The numbering refers to the number of championship events sponsored by the NCAA across all three of its divisions, which was 88 in the 2009–2010 and 2010–11 school years and has since increased to 90.) He is the Horizon League record-holder for career free throws made and attempted.

== High school ==
College recruiting
| Name | Hometown | School | Height | Weight | Commit date |
|---|---|---|---|---|---|
| Matt Howard; PF | Connersville, Indiana | Connersville High School (IN) | 6 ft 7 in (2.01 m) | 205 lb (93 kg) | Aug 17, 2006 |
| Matt Howard; PF | Recruit ratings: Scout: Rivals: (NA) | | | | |
Overall recruit ranking: Rivals: 91, 26 (PF), 7 (IN)
Note: In many cases, Scout, Rivals, 247Sports, On3, and ESPN may conflict in their listings of height and weight.; In these cases, the average was taken. ESPN grades are on a 100-point scale.; Sources: "Butler 2007 Basketball Commitments". Rivals.; "ESPN". ESPN.; "2007 Team Ranking". Rivals.

The 6' 8" Howard finished his high school career as the leading scorer and rebounder in Connersville history. As a senior in 2006–07, he averaged 23.6 points and 14.4 rebounds per game after averaging 19.1 points and 10.6 rebounds as a junior. He led the state of Indiana in rebounding as a high school senior in 2006–07 while playing for Connersville High School. Howard ranked second in the state in blocked shots as a junior. Howard is regarded as the first top-100 recruit in the history of Butler.

== College career ==
As a freshman, Howard was the Horizon League newcomer of the year. That year, he was prominent in the 2007–08 Bulldogs's first round victory in the 2008 NCAA Men's Division I Basketball Tournament over South Alabama. As a junior, he helped the 2009–10 Bulldogs make it to the championship game of the 2010 NCAA Men's Division I Basketball Tournament. In February of the 2010–11 NCAA Division I men's basketball season, Howard was hit by an elbow that caused extensive bleeding on his face. In the 2011 NCAA Men's Division I Basketball Tournament, he scored a tipin as time expired to give Butler a 60–58 victory over Old Dominion in their second-round game. Then in the third round, he made the winning free throw with 0.8 seconds left to clinch a 71–70 victory over the number-one seeded Pittsburgh Panthers. Although Howard made only 5 three point shots in his first three seasons, as a senior he developed an outside shot, making over 40% on over 100 attempts.

He earned Academic All-American selection in 2009, 2010 and 2011 and was named the 2011 Men's Basketball Academic All-America of the Year as well as the 2009 Horizon League Men's Basketball Player of the Year. He was a 2009 All-American honorable mention by the Associated Press. By helping Butler earn consecutive trips to the final four, Howard earned consecutive Elite 88 Awards in 2010 and 2011. He was also one of ten finalists for the 2011 men's basketball Lowe's Senior CLASS Award.

In 2010, he was chosen as "honorable mention" in a list of the smartest athletes in sports by Sporting News.

During the 2010 Horizon League Men's Basketball Tournament he earned the MVP Award. Then, during the 2011 Horizon League Men's Basketball Tournament he repeated as MVP and became the first person to become a four-time Horizon League Men's Basketball Tournament All-Tournament selection. He won the 2011 Lou Henson Award as the mid-major player of the year. Howard was the 2007–8 Horizon League Newcomer of the Year. He was a second team All-Horizon League selection that year and first team selection the following three seasons. He was a Horizon League All-Defensive Team selection as a sophomore and a senior. He holds the Horizon League records for most free throws made and attempted (both league only and all games). He led the Horizon League in field goal percentage as a sophomore with a 55.0 average.

=== College statistics ===
| Year | Team | GP | GS | MPG | FG% | 3P% | FT% | RPG | APG | SPG | BPG | PPG |
|---|---|---|---|---|---|---|---|---|---|---|---|---|
| 2007–08 | Butler | 34 | 25 | 24.5 | .583 | .000 | .780 | 5.50 | 0.85 | 0.71 | 1.09 | 12.26 |
| 2008–09 | Butler | 32 | 32 | 28.2 | .550 | .222 | .773 | 6.75 | 1.12 | 0.78 | 1.50 | 14.84 |
| 2009–10 | Butler | 38 | 38 | 25.2 | .479 | .273 | .784 | 5.16 | 0.79 | 0.58 | 0.61 | 11.50 |
| 2010–11 | Butler | 37 | 37 | 31.0 | .471 | .398 | .792 | 7.76 | 1.43 | 1.14 | 0.62 | 16.43 |

== Professional career ==
On July 28, 2011, Howard signed with Olympiacos of the Greek League. In February 2012, Howard was released by Olympiacos and signed with EnBW Ludwigsburg of the Basketball Bundesliga. In July 2012, Howard was named to the Phoenix Suns roster for the 2012 Las Vegas Summer League, and joined Chorale Roanne Basket for the 2012–13 Pro A season. The team is based out of Roanne, France.

In June 2013, Howard signed with ratiopharm Ulm of the German Basketball Bundesliga.

On July 7, 2014, he signed with Strasbourg IG of the French LNB Pro A for the 2014–15 season. On July 9, 2015, he signed a two-year contract extension with Strasbourg.

On August 1, 2017, Howard signed with the Israeli team Hapoel Tel Aviv for the 2017–18 season. On April 2, 2018, Howard recorded a season-high 20 points, shooting 8-of-12 from the field, along with six rebounds in 85–80 win over Maccabi Tel Aviv. Howard helped Hapoel to reach the 2018 Israeli League Final Four.

== Career statistics ==
Legend
| GP | Games played | GS | Games started | MPG | Minutes per game |
| FG% | Field-goal percentage | 3P% | 3-point field-goal percentage | FT% | Free-throw percentage |
| RPG | Rebounds per game | APG | Assists per game | SPG | Steals per game |
| BPG | Blocks per game | PPG | Points per game | PIR | Performance index rating |
| **Bold** | Career high |

=== EuroLeague ===
| † | Denotes seasons in which Howard won the EuroLeague |

| Year | Team | GP | GS | MPG | FG% | 3P% | FT% | RPG | APG | SPG | BPG | PPG | PIR |
|---|---|---|---|---|---|---|---|---|---|---|---|---|---|
| 2011–12† | Olympiacos | 3 | 0 | 6.3 | .000 | .000 | **1.000** | — | — | — | — | 0.7 | -1.0 |
| 2015–16 | Strasbourg | **4** | **1** | **20.8** | **.421** | **1.000** | .667 | **4.8** | **.5** | **1.8** | — | **6.3** | **9.0** |
| Career | | 7 | 1 | 14.7 | .333 | .200 | .714 | 2.7 | .3 | 1.0 | — | 3.9 | 4.7 |

== Playing style and personality ==
In a story immediately before the 2011 Final Four, Rick Reilly noted that Howard "looks more like a geeky band-camp RA than a possible NBA first rounder", but added:

The Bulldogs wouldn't be anywhere near Houston without Howard. He's the designated floor diver, the insatiable rebounder, the guy who sets the kind of picks that would stop an Amtrak train.... He's the thing you love most in a college basketball player — a guy who just wants to win and doesn't care who gets the credit. A guy who hits class by day and glass by night. A scabbed-knee grinder who finishes every game with his tank on E.

He is also known for eccentricities both on and off the court. Howard's teammate Shelvin Mack told Reilly that Howard had six pairs of new shoes in his locker, but refused to wear them, preferring to stay with what Mack described as "ratty old ones". Howard also habitually rode a rusted-out bicycle to Butler's 6:00 am practices, regardless of the weather; during one 2011 ice storm, the handlebars bent under him while he was riding, causing him to fall onto the ice. He would say about this incident, "I fixed it. Just poured some WD-40 in there and bent them back. It's a little risky to ride, I guess, but I can't see buying a new one." He also has a habit of spoonerism with people's names; for example, he routinely calls Mack "Melvin Shack".
