= Brian Zoubek =

American basketball player (born 1988)

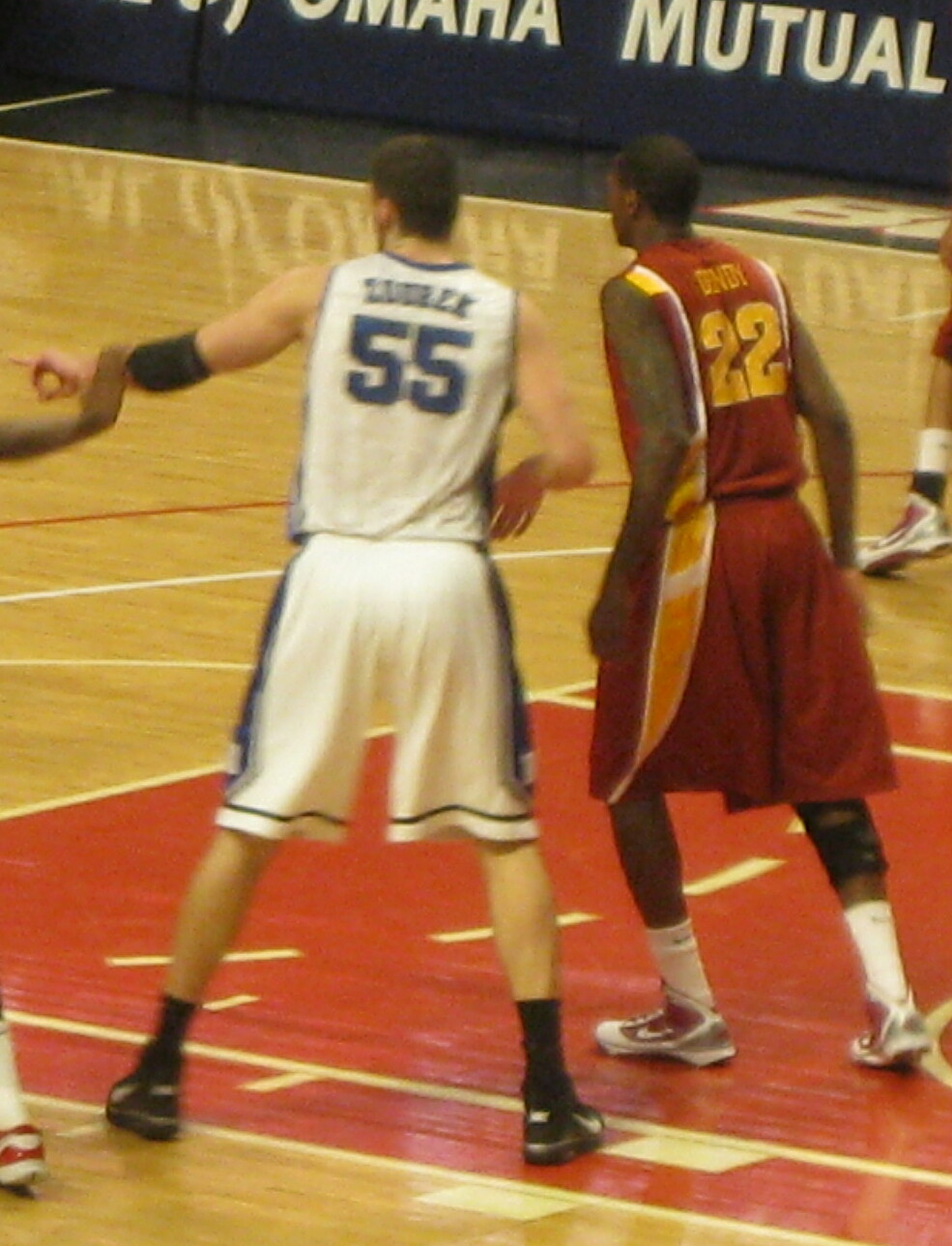
- Zoubek in 2010

Personal information
- Born: April 6, 1988 (age 38) Haddonfield, New Jersey, U.S.
- Listed height: 7 ft 1 in (2.16 m)
- Listed weight: 260 lb (118 kg)

Career information
- High school: Haddonfield Memorial (Haddonfield, New Jersey)
- College: Duke (2006–2010)
- NBA draft: 2010: undrafted
- Position: Center
- Number: 55

Career highlights
- NCAA champion (2010); Fourth-team Parade All-American (2006)

Brian Henry Zoubek (born April 6, 1988) is an American retired 7-foot-1-inch (2.16 m) basketball center. He was a member of the Duke Blue Devils' 2010 NCAA Championship team.

== Family ==
Zoubek's father, Paul, played baseball and football for Princeton University, and his mother, Liza Cartmell, rowed crew at Wellesley. His older sister, Sarah, played basketball at Yale University.

== High school ==
During his four years at Haddonfield Memorial High School, the Bulldawgs had a record of 110–10 and won three championships. In 2006 Zoubek was named as a fourth-team Parade All-American selection, named to the Jordan All-America team, and was New Jersey Player of the Year. He was twice selected by the Newark Star-Ledger to the all-state first team and was selected all-conference and All-South Jersey three times.

Zoubek averaged 24.7 points, 12.3 rebounds, and 4.2 blocks per game as a senior. He was rated 33rd overall by The Recruiting Services Consensus Index, and ranked 24th in the Rivals.com Top 150 prospects of 2006.

== College ==
Zoubek started his Duke career with two double figure scoring games, against UNC Greensboro and Columbia.

In the summer of 2007 he broke the fifth metatarsal in his left foot in a pickup game. The break required surgery and the use of crutches until the fall, when he was fitted with a carbon and steel cast. In January 2008, he broke his left foot again, this time in practice. Doctors realized his foot had not healed, and in the off-season he again had surgery, followed by crutches, the boot, and rehab.

Zoubek recorded his first double-double with 11 points and 13 rebounds against St. John's on February 24, 2008. A fan favorite at Duke, he was often showered with chants of "Zooooouuu" from the Cameron Crazies after grabbing a rebound or scoring.

2009–10

The team's rebounding and defense improved with him in the lineup in 2009–10. In February 2010, he had a career-high 17 rebounds in his first career start against Maryland, cementing his spot in the starting lineup. He was a key supporting player of the team, and was 7th in the ACC with 7.7 rebounds per game (and 2nd on the offensive boards, with 3.5 rebounds per game). Per 40 minutes of play, he averaged 16.8 rebounds. Zoubek led the NCAA in pace-adjusted offensive rebounding at 7.8 per 40 minutes for the season and is second in this category for the past decade - only DeJuan Blair of Pittsburgh has put up better numbers. He ended his career 4th on Duke's all-time list in offensive rebounds (276), and in his senior year set the school's single-season record of 145. He was also named to the All-ACC academic team.

Explaining his resurgence after suffering through foot injuries his sophomore and junior years, he said:

It's a process. A lot of days in the gym, a lot of sweat, a lot of hatred toward [assistant coach Steve Wojciechowski] for all the stuff he put me through [laughing]. But it was all worth it. It's hard to see the future in all the work you put in. How's it going to help you, and is it worth it? It is. This really proves that.

Teammate Jon Scheyer said: "He's a player you love to play with and you hate to play against. He's just really physical. He's such a big body. Even if he doesn't mean to, you run into him. And you really feel it."

=== Statistics ===
Freshman

Games: 32, PPG: 3.1, RPG: 2.2, APG: 0.2, FG%: 52.4%
Sophomore

Games: 25, PPG: 3.8, RPG: 3.8, APG: 0.5, FG%: 59.4%
Junior

Games: 36, PPG: 4.1, RPG: 3.7, APG: 0.4, FG%: 57.5%

Senior

Games: 40, PPG: 5.6, RPG: 7.7, APG: 1.0, FG%: 63.8%

== Professional ==
Brian Zoubek went undrafted in the 2010 NBA draft along with teammate Jon Scheyer.

On July 1, 2010, Zoubek was signed by the New Jersey Nets to a contract. He was later waived on October 22, 2010.

== After basketball ==
After working for a technology start-up for a year, Zoubek opened a bakery called Dream Puffz, which specialized in cream puffs. Dream Puffz opened in Haddonfield, New Jersey on July 30, 2012. However, Zoubek shut down Dream Puffz on February 16, 2013 to pursue real estate opportunities. Zoubek said he is in negotiations to sell the rights to the Dream Puffz name.
