= Ronald Nored =

American basketball coach & player (born 1990)

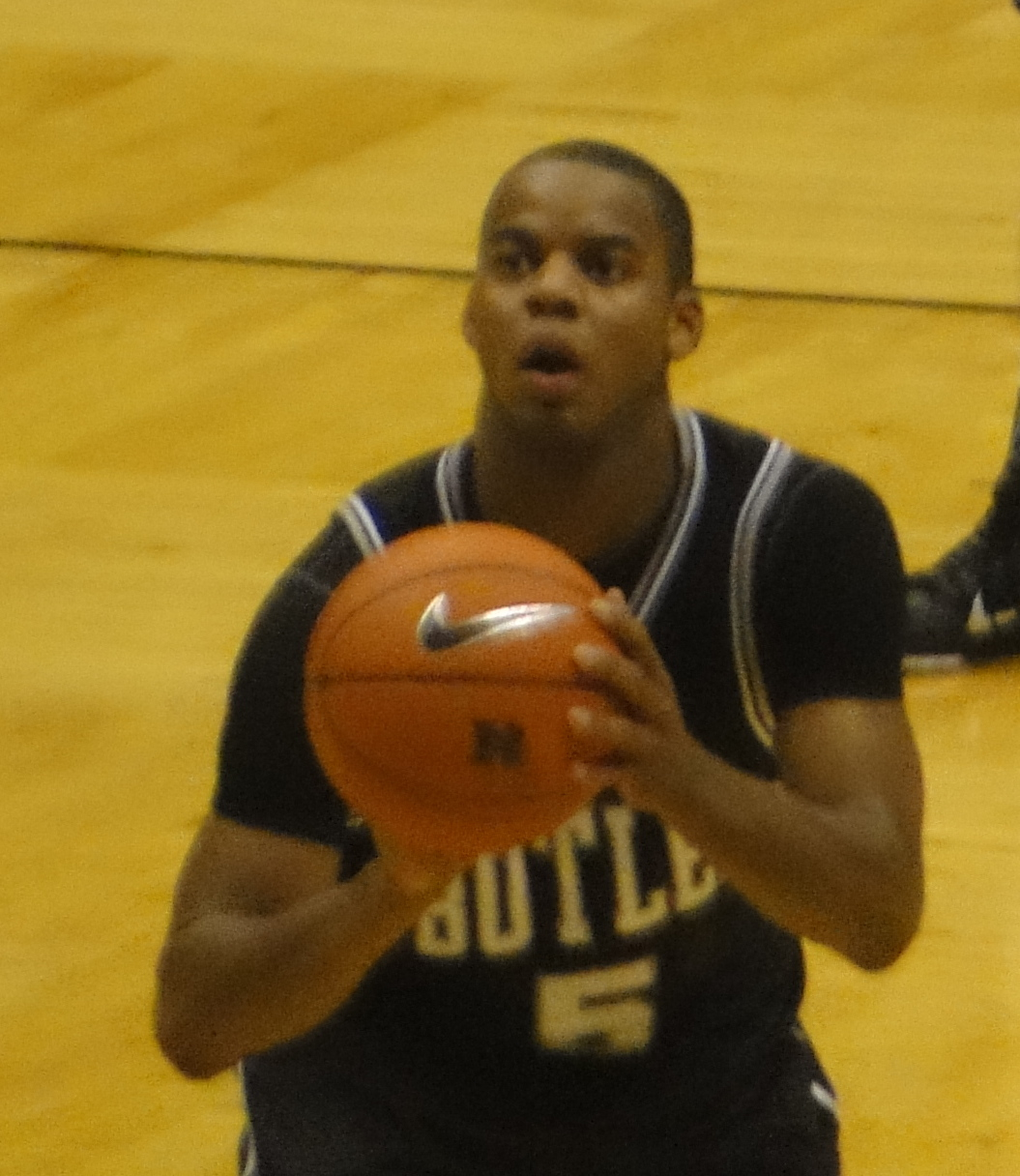
- Nored as a player at Butler.

Current position
- Title: Head coach
- Team: Butler
- Conference: Big East
- Record: 4–3 (.571)

Biographical details
- Born: March 1, 1990 (age 36); Homewood, Alabama, U.S.

Playing career
- 2008–2012: Butler
- Position: Point guard

Coaching career (HC unless noted)
- 2012–2013: Brownsburg HS
- 2013–2014: Maine Red Claws (assistant)
- 2014–2015: Boston Celtics (assistant/player development)
- 2015–2016: Northern Kentucky (assistant)
- 2016–2018: Long Island Nets
- 2018–2021: Charlotte Hornets (assistant)
- 2021–2023: Indiana Pacers (assistant)
- 2023–2026: Atlanta Hawks (assistant)
- 2026–present: Butler

Head coaching record
- Overall: 4–3 (.571)

Accomplishments and honors

Awards
- 2× Horizon League Defensive Player of the Year (2010, 2012)

Ronald Nored (born March 1, 1990) is an American basketball coach and former player who is currently the head men's basketball coach at Butler University, his alma mater. Previously he served as the head coach of the Long Island Nets of the NBA G League, an assistant coach for the Maine Red Claws of the Boston Celtics organization, and assistant coach for the Indiana Pacers and Atlanta Hawks of the National Basketball Association (NBA).

== Playing career ==
=== High school ===
Nored starred as an all-state point guard for Homewood High School in Homewood, Alabama, averaging 15.3 points and 6.9 rebounds per game as a senior, when he led the team to a 31–5 record and a state finals appearance in 2008. His career-high game came as a junior when he scored 38 points against Briarwood Christian High School. During his senior year, Nored made a verbal commitment to Western Kentucky University, but backed out after coach Darrin Horn left for the University of South Carolina. He turned down an academic scholarship to Harvard University and basketball offers from Samford University and the University of South Alabama to instead play for Brad Stevens at Butler, just a few miles away from his grandparents' house in Indianapolis.

=== College ===
Quickly establishing himself as a tenacious defender and a vocal court leader, Nored started all 32 games in his freshman season. His season-high game came when he went 4-for-4 from the court, including the game-winning shot, in an 11-point night against Cleveland State. In his sophomore season he was named the Horizon League's co-defensive player of the year and the league's all-tournament team. He recorded a career-high 8 assists in a home win over Wright State. His high-scoring night came against Illinois–Chicago with 16 points. He scored 15 points and had 6 assists in Butler's 2nd-round NCAA tournament victory over Murray State and grabbed five steals against Syracuse in the West Region semifinal. He scored 7 points with 6 rebounds in the loss to Duke in the championship game. As a junior, Nored averaged 5.0 points per game with a high of 16 against Utah. He helped Butler return to the title game of the NCAA tournament, but failed to score from the field, earning all 6 of his tournament points at the free-throw line. He did get two steals and four rebounds in 26 minutes against Connecticut in the title game.

== Coaching career ==
After graduating, Nored coached at Brownsburg High School in Indiana and college basketball at the University of South Alabama, briefly before Brad Stevens, his former college coach at Butler University, offered him a coaching position with the Boston Celtics. He served as a coach for the Maine Red Claws of the NBA D-League from 2013 to 2015. On April 28, 2015, Nored was named as an assistant coach for Northern Kentucky University. On April 15, 2016, the Brooklyn Nets hired him to be the first head coach for the Long Island Nets. Nored served as an assistant coach in the NBA with the Charlotte Hornets from 2018 to 2021, with the Indiana Pacers from 2021 to 2023, and with the Atlanta Hawks from 2023 to 2026.

=== Butler ===
On March 25, 2026, Nored was announced as the new head coach at Butler to replace the retiring Thad Matta.

== Personal life ==
Nored grew up in Birmingham, Alabama, where his father, Ron Nored Sr., was pastor of Bethel AME Church in Ensley and a co-founder and executive director of Bethel-Ensley Action Task (BEAT). Nored Sr., died from pancreatic cancer in 2003. Ron is married to Danielle Eng, a former accountant for RSM. The pair have four children.

== Head coaching record ==
Record table
Season	Team	Overall	Conference	Standing	Postseason
Butler Bulldogs (Big East Conference) (2026–present)
2026–27	Butler	4–3	0–0		
Butler:		4–3 (.571)	0–0 (–)		
Total:		4–3 (.571)			
