= 2000–01 Butler Bulldogs men's basketball team =

American college basketball season

2000–01 Butler Bulldogs men's basketball
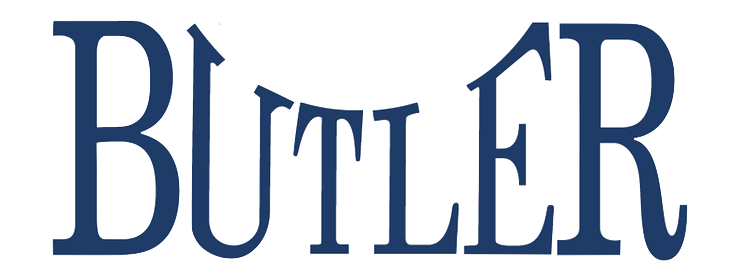

MCC tournament champions MCC regular season champions

NCAA tournament, second round
- Conference: Midwestern Collegiate Conference
- Record: 24–8 (11–3 MCC)
- Head coach: Thad Matta (1st season)
- Assistant coaches: Todd Lickliter; Mike Marsahll; John Groce

2000–01 Midwestern Collegiate Conference men's basketball standings
	Conf.				Overall
Team	W		L	PCT	W		L	PCT
Butler †	11	–	3	.786	24	–	8	.750
Detroit	10	–	4	.714	25	–	12	.676
Cleveland State	9	–	5	.643	19	–	13	.594
Wright State	8	–	6	.571	18	–	11	.621
Milwaukee	7	–	7	.500	15	–	13	.536
UIC	5	–	9	.357	11	–	17	.393
Green Bay	4	–	10	.286	11	–	17	.393
Loyola Chicago	2	–	12	.143	7	–	21	.250
† 2001 MCC tournament winner

The 2000–01 Butler Bulldogs men's basketball team represented Butler University in the 2000–01 NCAA Division I men's basketball season. Their head coach was Thad Matta, serving in his 1st season as head coach at the school. The Bulldogs played their home games at Hinkle Fieldhouse as members of the Midwestern Collegiate Conference. Butler finished first in the MCC season standings and won the MCC tournament to receive the conference's automatic bid to the NCAA tournament – the school's fourth NCAA Tournament appearance in five years. As No. 10 seed in the Midwest region, the Bulldogs took down No. 7 seed Wake Forest, 79–63, in the opening round, before falling to No. 2 seed Arizona in the second round. For the second straight season, Butler lost to the eventual National runner-up. Butler finished the season with a record of 24–8 (11–3 MCC).

== Roster ==
2000–01 Butler Bulldogs men's basketball team
Players
Coaches

Pos.	#	Name	Height	Weight	Year	Hometown
G	25	LaVall Jordan (C)	6 ft 2 in (1.88 m)	185 lb (84 kg)	Sr	Albion, MI
G	5	Thomas Jackson	5 ft 9 in (1.75 m)	165 lb (75 kg)	Jr	East Lansing, MI
F	42	Rylan Hainje	6 ft 6 in (1.98 m)	235 lb (107 kg)	Jr	Indianapolis, IN
C	40	Scott Robisch	6 ft 11 in (2.11 m)	235 lb (107 kg)	Jr	Springfield, IL
G	4	Brandon Miller	6 ft 0 in (1.83 m)	170 lb (77 kg)	RS So	New Castle, IN
F	33	Joel Cornette	6 ft 10 in (2.08 m)	230 lb (104 kg)	So	Cincinnati, OH
G	10	Darnell Archey	6 ft 1 in (1.85 m)	160 lb (73 kg)	So	New Castle, IN
F	23	Rob Walls	6 ft 5 in (1.96 m)	205 lb (93 kg)	So	Aurora, IL
F	51	Lewis Curry	6 ft 7 in (2.01 m)	230 lb (104 kg)	So	Fort Wayne, IN
C	55	Mike Moore	6 ft 10 in (2.08 m)	220 lb (100 kg)	So	Fairborn, OH
G	22	Mike Monserez (redshirt)	6 ft 6 in (1.98 m)	235 lb (107 kg)	RS So	Cincinnati, OH
F	1	Duane Lightfoot	6 ft 5 in (1.96 m)	220 lb (100 kg)	Fr	Louisville, KY
G	30	Nick Gardner	6 ft 4 in (1.93 m)	215 lb (98 kg)	Fr	Indianapolis, IN
C	13	Ben Grunst	7 ft 0 in (2.13 m)	300 lb (136 kg)	Fr	Milwaukee, WI
	34	Ryan Fulquist	—	—

Head coach

- Thad Matta (Butler)

Assistant coach(es)

- Todd Lickliter (Butler)
- Mike Marshall (Butler)
- John Groce (Taylor)

Legend

- (C) Team captain
- (S) Suspended
- (I) Ineligible
- (W) Walk-on
- Injured
- Current redshirt

Roster

== Schedule and results ==
Date time, TV	Rank^{#}	Opponent^{#}	Result	Record	Site city, state
Regular season
Nov 18, 2000*		Eastern Illinois	W 90–73	1–0	Hinkle Fieldhouse (3,598); Indianapolis, Indiana
Nov 20, 2000*		at Birmingham–Southern	W 71–62	2–0	Bill Battle Coliseum (1,250); Birmingham, Alabama
Nov 27, 2000*		Ball State	W 71–48	3–0	Hinkle Fieldhouse (7,105); Indianapolis, Indiana
Dec 2, 2000*		at Evansville	L 73–74	3–1	Roberts Stadium (6,661); Evansville, Indiana
Dec 6, 2000*		at Indiana State	L 88–90 ^{OT}	3–2	Hulman Center (5,533); Terre Haute, Indiana
Dec 16, 2000*		UNC Wilmington	L 48–53	3–3	Hinkle Fieldhouse (4,021); Indianapolis, Indiana
Dec 18, 2000*		Tennessee-Martin	W 77–48	4–3	Hinkle Fieldhouse (2,785); Indianapolis, Indiana
Dec 20, 2000*		Santa Clara	W 84–60	5–3	Hinkle Fieldhouse (3,531); Indianapolis, Indiana
Dec 23, 2000*		TCU	W 86–73	6–3	Hinkle Fieldhouse (4,038); Indianapolis, Indiana
Dec 28, 2000*		at No. 12 Arizona	L 60–72	6–4	McKale Center (14,565); Tucson, Arizona
Dec 30, 2000*		vs. Louisiana-Lafayette	W 74–63	7–4	McKale Center (14,565); Tucson, Arizona
Jan 3, 2001*		Lipscomb	W 72–56	8–4	Hinkle Fieldhouse (3,317); Indianapolis, Indiana
Jan 6, 2001		at Wright State	L 61–62	8–5 (0–1)	Ervin J. Nutter Center (5,005); Fairborn, Ohio
Jan 11, 2001		Cleveland State	W 65–52	9–5 (1–1)	Hinkle Fieldhouse (3,582); Indianapolis, Indiana
Jan 13, 2001		Detroit	W 74–59	10–5 (2–1)	Hinkle Fieldhouse (5,612); Indianapolis, Indiana
Jan 20, 2001		at Milwaukee	W 60–51	11–5 (3–1)	Klotsche Center (4,234); Milwaukee, Wisconsin
Jan 22, 2001		at Green Bay	L 68–69	11–6 (3–2)	Brown County Arena (3,609); Green Bay, Wisconsin
Jan 25, 2001		UIC	W 76–69	12–6 (4–2)	Hinkle Fieldhouse (3,653); Indianapolis, Indiana
Jan 27, 2001		Loyola (IL)	W 71–57	13–6 (5–2)	Hinkle Fieldhouse (5,018); Indianapolis, Indiana
Jan 30, 2001*		at No. 10 Wisconsin	W 58–44	14–6	Kohl Center (16,233); Madison, Wisconsin
Feb 3, 2001		Wright State	W 59–48	15–6 (6–2)	Hinkle Fieldhouse (8,277); Indianapolis, Indiana
Feb 8, 2001		at Detroit	L 63–68	15–7 (6–3)	Calihan Hall (3,502); Detroit, Michigan
Feb 10, 2001		at Cleveland State	W 59–56	16–7 (7–3)	CSU Convocation Center (7,333); Cleveland, Ohio
Feb 15, 2001		Milwaukee	W 80–75 ^{OT}	17–7 (8–3)	Hinkle Fieldhouse (4,234); Indianapolis, Indiana
Feb 17, 2001		Green Bay	W 78–52	18–7 (9–3)	Hinkle Fieldhouse (7,566); Indianapolis, Indiana
Feb 22, 2001		at Loyola (IL)	W 66–62	19–7 (10–3)	Joseph J. Gentile Center (1,511); Chicago, Illinois
Feb 24, 2001		at UIC	W 68–66	20–7 (11–3)	UIC Pavilion (5,042); Chicago, Illinois
MCC tournament
Mar 3, 2001*		vs. Loyola (IL); Quarterfinals	W 78–52	21–7	Ervin J. Nutter Center (5,115); Fairborn, Ohio
Mar 4, 2001*		at Wright State; Semifinals	W 66–58	22–7	Ervin J. Nutter Center (6,181); Fairborn, Ohio
Mar 6, 2001*		vs. Detroit; Championship game	W 53–38	23–7	Ervin J. Nutter Center (6,102); Fairborn, Ohio
NCAA tournament
Mar 16, 2001*	(10 MW)	vs. (7 MW) No. 23 Wake Forest; First Round	W 79–63	24–7	Kemper Arena (13,550); Kansas City, Missouri
Mar 18, 2001*	(10 MW)	vs. (2 MW) No. 5 Arizona; Second Round	L 52–73	24–8	Kemper Arena (14,450); Kansas City, Missouri
*Non-conference game. ^{#}Rankings from AP poll. (#) Tournament seedings in parentheses. MW=Midwest. All times are in Eastern Time.
