= List of Butler Bulldogs men's basketball seasons =

This is a list of seasons completed by the Butler Bulldogs men's basketball team of the National Collegiate Athletic Association (NCAA) Division I.

== Seasons ==
Statistics overview
Season	Coach	Overall	Conference	Standing	Postseason
Unknown (Independent) (1896–1897)
1896–97	Unknown	1–0			
James L. Zink (Independent) (1897–1899)
1897–98	James Zink	2–3			
1898–99	James Zink	0–2			
James L. Zink:		2–5 (.286)			
Walter F. Kelly (Independent) (1899–1903)
1899–1900	Walter F. Kelly	2–1			
1900–01	Walter F. Kelly	2–1			
1901–02	Walter F. Kelly	1–3			
1902–03	Walter F. Kelly	1–3			
Walter F. Kelly:		6–8 (.429)			
Ralph Jones (Independent) (1903–1904)
1903–04	Ralph Jones	2–2			
Ralph Jones:		2–2 (.500)			
Edgar Wingard (Independent) (1904–1906)
1904–05	Edgar Wingard	6–2			
1905–06	Edgar Wingard	1–1			
Edgar Wingard:		7–3 (.700)			
Art Guedel (Independent) (1906–1907)
1906–07	Art Guedel	2–4			
Art Guedel:		2–4 (.333)			
John McKay (Independent) (1907–1909)
1907–08	John McKay	4–4			
1908–09	John McKay; Joe McCrea	5–2			
John McKay:		9–6 (.600)			
Walter Gipe (Independent) (1909–1910)
1909–10	Walter Gipe	3–4			
Walter Gipe:		3–4 (.429)			
Bill Diddle (Independent) (1910–1912)
1910–11	Bill Diddle	5–7			
1911–12	Bill Diddle	5–5			
Bill Diddle:		10–12 (.455)			
G. Cullen Thomas (Independent) (1912–1918)
1912–13	G. Cullen Thomas	3–8			
1913–14	No team				
1914–15	G. Cullen Thomas	3–4			
1915–16	G. Cullen Thomas	3–4			
1916–17	G. Cullen Thomas	7–6			
1917–18	G. Cullen Thomas	0–6			
G. Cullen Thomas:		16–28 (.364)			
Joe Mullane (Independent) (1918–1919)
1918–19	Joe Mullane	1–9			
Joe Mullane:		1–9 (.100)			
F. E. Ellis (Independent) (1919–1920)
1919–20	F. E. Ellis	2–4			
F. E. Ellis:		2–4 (.333)			
Harlan Page (Independent) (1920–1926)
1920–21	Harlan Page	16–4			
1921–22	Harlan Page	24–6			
1922–23	Harlan Page	16–4			
1923–24	Harlan Page	11–7			AAU National Champion
1924–25	Harlan Page	20–4			
1925–26	Harlan Page	16–5			
Harlan Page:		103–30 (.774)			
Tony Hinkle (Independent) (1926–1932)
1926–27	Tony Hinkle	17–4			
1927–28	Tony Hinkle	19–3			
1928–29	Tony Hinkle	17–2			John J. McDevitt National Champion; Veteran Athletes of Philadelphia
1929–30	Tony Hinkle	12–8			
1930–31	Tony Hinkle	17–2			
1931–32	Tony Hinkle	14–5			
Tony Hinkle (Missouri Valley Conference) (1932–1934)
1932–33	Tony Hinkle	16–5	9–1	1st	
1933–34	Tony Hinkle	14–7	9–1	1st	
Tony Hinkle (Independent) (1934–1942)
1934–35	Tony Hinkle	13–7			
1935–36	Tony Hinkle	6–15			
1936–37	Tony Hinkle	6–15			
1937–38	Tony Hinkle	11–12			
1938–39	Tony Hinkle	14–6			
1939–40	Tony Hinkle	17–6			
1940–41	Tony Hinkle	13–9			
1941–42	Tony Hinkle	13–9			
Frank Hedden (Independent) (1942–1945)
1942–43	Frank Hedden	4–9			
1943–44	No Team				
1944–45	Frank Hedden	14–6			
Frank Hedden:		18–15 (.545)			
Tony Hinkle (Independent) (1945–1946)
1945–46	Tony Hinkle	12–8			
Tony Hinkle (Mid–American Conference) (1946–1950)
1946–47	Tony Hinkle	16–7	4–1	1st	
1947–48	Tony Hinkle	14–7	4–2	2nd	
1948–49	Tony Hinkle	18–5	8–2	2nd	
1949–50	Tony Hinkle	12–12	6–4	T–2nd	
Tony Hinkle (Indiana Collegiate Conference) (1950–1970)
1950–51	Tony Hinkle	5–19	3–9		
1951–52	Tony Hinkle	12–12	10–2	1st	
1952–53	Tony Hinkle	14–9	9–3	1st	
1953–54	Tony Hinkle	13–12	7–4	1st	
1954–55	Tony Hinkle	10–14	8–4		
1955–56	Tony Hinkle	14–9	8–4		
1956–57	Tony Hinkle	11–14	6–6		
1957–58	Tony Hinkle	16–10	10–2		NIT First Round
1958–59	Tony Hinkle	19–9	10–2	1st	NIT Quarterfinal
1959–60	Tony Hinkle	15–11	10–2		
1960–61	Tony Hinkle	15–11	10–2	1st	
1961–62	Tony Hinkle	22–6	10–2	1st	NCAA University Division Sweet Sixteen
1962–63	Tony Hinkle	16–10	10–2		
1963–64	Tony Hinkle	13–13	9–3		
1964–65	Tony Hinkle	11–15	5–7		
1965–66	Tony Hinkle	16–10	8–4		
1966–67	Tony Hinkle	9–17	5–7		
1967–68	Tony Hinkle	11–14	6–6		
1968–69	Tony Hinkle	11–15	4–4		
1969–70	Tony Hinkle	15–11	6–2	1st	
Tony Hinkle:		560–392 (.588)	248–88 (.738)		
George Theofanis (Indiana Collegiate Conference) (1970–1977)
1970–71	George Theofanis	10–16	4–4		
1971–72	George Theofanis	6–20	2–6		
1972–73	George Theofanis	14–12	8–4	1st	
1973–74	George Theofanis	14–12	9–3		
1974–75	George Theofanis	10–16	6–6		
1975–76	George Theofanis	12–15	6–6		
1976–77	George Theofanis	13–14	7–3	1st	
George Theofanis:		79–105 (.429)	42–32 (.568)		
Joe Sexson (Indiana Collegiate Conference) (1977–1978)
1977–78	Joe Sexson	15–11	6–0	1st	
Joe Sexson (Independent) (1978–1979)
1978–79	Joe Sexson	11–16			
Joe Sexson (Horizon League) (1979–1989)
1979–80	Joe Sexson	12–15	2–2	4th	
1980–81	Joe Sexson	5–22	1–10	6th	
1981–82	Joe Sexson	7–20	3–9	6th	
1982–83	Joe Sexson	15–13	9–5	4th	
1983–84	Joe Sexson	13–15	7–8	T–4th	
1984–85	Joe Sexson	19–10	8–6	2nd	NIT First Round
1985–86	Joe Sexson	9–19	2–10	7th	
1986–87	Joe Sexson	12–16	4–8	T–5th	
1987–88	Joe Sexson	14–14	5–5	T–3rd	
1988–89	Joe Sexson	11–17	3–9	7th	
Joe Sexson:		143–188 (.432)	50–72 (.410)		
Barry Collier (Horizon League) (1989–2000)
1989–90	Barry Collier	6–22	2–12	8th	
1990–91	Barry Collier	18–11	10–4	2nd	NIT First Round
1991–92	Barry Collier	21–10	7–3	T–2nd	NIT First Round
1992–93	Barry Collier	11–17	6–8	T–5th	
1993–94	Barry Collier	16–13	6–4	T–2nd	
1994–95	Barry Collier	15–12	8–7	5th	
1995–96	Barry Collier	19–8	11–5	2nd	
1996–97	Barry Collier	23–10	12–4	1st	NCAA Division I First Round
1997–98	Barry Collier	22–11	8–6	3rd	NCAA Division I First Round
1998–99	Barry Collier	22–10	11–3	2nd	NIT Quarterfinal
1999–2000	Barry Collier	23–8	12–2	1st	NCAA Division I First Round
Barry Collier:		196–132 (.598)	93–58 (.616)		
Thad Matta (Horizon League) (2000–2001)
2000–01	Thad Matta	24–8	11–3	1st	NCAA Division I Second Round
Todd Lickliter (Horizon League) (2001–2007)
2001–02	Todd Lickliter	26–6	12–4	1st	NIT Second Round
2002–03	Todd Lickliter	27–6	14–2	1st	NCAA Division I Sweet Sixteen
2003–04	Todd Lickliter	16–14	8–8	6th	
2004–05	Todd Lickliter	13–15	7–9	7th	
2005–06	Todd Lickliter	20–13	11–5	2nd	NIT First Round
2006–07	Todd Lickliter	29–7	13–3	T–1st	NCAA Division I Sweet Sixteen
Todd Lickliter:		131–61 (.682)	65–31 (.677)		
Brad Stevens (Horizon League) (2007–2012)
2007–08	Brad Stevens	30–4	16–2	1st	NCAA Division I Second Round
2008–09	Brad Stevens	26–6	15–3	1st	NCAA Division I First Round
2009–10	Brad Stevens	33–5	18–0	1st	NCAA Division I Runner–up
2010–11	Brad Stevens	28–10	13–5	T–1st	NCAA Division I Runner–up
2011–12	Brad Stevens	22–15	11–7	T–3rd	CBI Semifinal
Brad Stevens (Atlantic 10) (2012–2013)
2012–13	Brad Stevens	27–9	11–5	T–3rd	NCAA Division I Third Round
Brad Stevens:		166–49 (.772)	73–17 (.811)		
Brandon Miller (Big East) (2013–2014)
2013–14	Brandon Miller	14–17	4–14	9th	
Brandon Miller:		14–17 (.452)	4–14 (.222)		
Chris Holtmann (Big East) (2014–2017)
2014–15	Chris Holtmann	23–11	12–6	T–2nd	NCAA Division I Third Round
2015–16	Chris Holtmann	22–11	10–8	T–4th	NCAA Division I Second Round
2016–17	Chris Holtmann	25–9	12–6	2nd	NCAA Division I Sweet Sixteen
Chris Holtmann:		70–31 (.693)	34–20 (.630)		
LaVall Jordan (Big East) (2017–2022)
2017–18	LaVall Jordan	21–14	9–9	6th	NCAA Division I Second Round
2018–19	LaVall Jordan	16–16	7–11	T–8th	
2019–20	LaVall Jordan	22–9	10–8	5th	No postseason held
2020–21	LaVall Jordan	10–15	8–12	10th	
2021–22	LaVall Jordan	14–19	6–14	T–9th	
LaVall Jordan:		83–74 (.529)	40–54 (.426)		
Thad Matta (Big East) (2022–2026)
2022–23	Thad Matta	14–18	6–14	9th	
2023–24	Thad Matta	18–15	9–11	T–8th	NIT First Round
2024–25	Thad Matta	15–20	6–14	T–8th	CBC Quarterfinals
2025–26	Thad Matta	16–16	7–13	T–7th	
Thad Matta:		87–77 (.530)	39–55 (.415)		
Ronald Nored (Big East) (2026–Present)
2026–27	Ronald Nored	0–0	0–0		
Ronald Nored:		0–0 (–)	0–0 (–)		
Total:		1,695–1,240 (.578)			
National champion Postseason invitational champion Conference regular season champion Conference regular season and conference tournament champion Division regular season champion Division regular season and conference tournament champion Conference tournament champion
