= 2000–01 Wright State Raiders men's basketball team =

American college basketball season

2000–01 Wright State Raiders men's basketball
- Conference: MCC
- Record: 18–11 (8–6 MCC)
- Head coach: Ed Schilling (4th season)
- Assistant coaches: Will Rey; Rod Foster; Clay Nunley
- Home arena: Nutter Center

2000–01 Midwestern Collegiate Conference men's basketball standings
| | Conf. | | | | Overall |
| Team | W | | L | PCT | W | | L | PCT |
|---|---|---|---|---|---|---|---|---|
| Butler † | 11 | – | 3 | .786 | 24 | – | 8 | .750 |
| Detroit | 10 | – | 4 | .714 | 25 | – | 12 | .676 |
| Cleveland State | 9 | – | 5 | .643 | 19 | – | 13 | .594 |
| Wright State | 8 | – | 6 | .571 | 18 | – | 11 | .621 |
| Milwaukee | 7 | – | 7 | .500 | 15 | – | 13 | .536 |
| UIC | 5 | – | 9 | .357 | 11 | – | 17 | .393 |
| Green Bay | 4 | – | 10 | .286 | 11 | – | 17 | .393 |
| Loyola Chicago | 2 | – | 12 | .143 | 7 | – | 21 | .250 |
† 2001 MCC tournament winner

The 2000–01 Wright State Raiders men's basketball team represented Wright State University in the 2000–01 NCAA Division I men's basketball season led by head coach Ed Schilling.

== Season summary ==
While the Raiders would not challenge for the conference title, the 2000-01 season was the best season since the 1992-93 season, and easily the best of the Ed Schilling era. 18 wins, a winning conference record, the fourth seed in the conference tournament; the season would again end with a loss to Butler University who would go on to upset Wake Forest in the NCAA tournament. Melson, Sheinfeld, Deister and Hollins all had monster season. It felt like a return to form for Wright State Basketball, however the pattern of dominant home play yet puzzling road losses remained.

=== Roster Changes ===
==== Joining ====
- Braden Bushman (F) a multi-sport star recruited out of Mississinewa High School.
- Michael Doles (F) recruited from Meadowbrook High School in Richmond, VA.
- Ross McGregor (C) from North Side High School in Fort Wayne.
- Cain Doliboa (G/F) transferred from University of Dayton and will redshirt.
- Seth Doliboa (G/F) transferred from Bowling Green State University and will redshirt.

==== Leaving ====
- John Watkins.
- Louis Holmes due to health and family issues.

== Roster ==
2000–01 Wright State Raiders men's basketball team
Players
Coaches

| Pos. | # | Name | Height | Weight | Year | Previous school | Hometown |
|---|---|---|---|---|---|---|---|
| F | 3 | Kevin Melson | 6 ft 6 in (1.98 m) | 204 lb (93 kg) | Sr | Schoolcraft CC | Detroit, MI |
| C | 52 | Bruno Petersons | 7 ft 1 in (2.16 m) | 256 lb (116 kg) | Sr | Wheaton Academy | West Chicago, IL |
| F | 10 | Israel Sheinfeld | 6 ft 11 in (2.11 m) | 290 lb (132 kg) | Jr | Tel Aviv, Israel |
| G | 12 | Tyson Freeman | 6 ft 0 in (1.83 m) | 173 lb (78 kg) | Jr | Scott | Toledo, OH |
| F | 20 | Marcus May | 5 ft 10 in (1.78 m) | 178 lb (81 kg) | Jr | North Central | Indianapolis |
| G | 33 | Jesse Deister | 6 ft 3 in (1.91 m) | 195 lb (88 kg) | RS Jr | Olathe Christian | Topeka, KS |
| G | 00 | Vernard Hollins | 6 ft 3 in (1.91 m) | 195 lb (88 kg) | So | North Side | Ft. Wayne, IN |
| G | 13 | Joe Bills | 6 ft 0 in (1.83 m) | 179 lb (81 kg) | So | Rosecrans | Zanesville, OH |
| F | 40 | Thomas Hope | 6 ft 8 in (2.03 m) | 227 lb (103 kg) | So | Bluevale | Waterloo, Ontario |
| F | 3 | Braden Bushman | 6 ft 4 in (1.93 m) | 179 lb (81 kg) | Fr | Mississinewa | Gas City, IN |
| F | 21 | Michael Doles | 6 ft 5 in (1.96 m) | 198 lb (90 kg) | Fr | Meadowbrook | Richmond, VA |
| C | 55 | Ross McGregor | 6 ft 9 in (2.06 m) | 228 lb (103 kg) | Fr | Meadowbrook | Richmond, VA |
| G | 11 | Cain Doliboa (redshirt) | 6 ft 7 in (2.01 m) | 200 lb (91 kg) | Sr | Springboro | Springboro, OH |
| G | 15 | Seth Doliboa (redshirt) | 6 ft 7 in (2.01 m) | 191 lb (87 kg) | So | North Side | Ft. Wayne, IN |

Head coach

- Ed Schilling

Assistant coach(es)

Will Rey, Rod Foster, Clay Nunley

Legend

- (C) Team captain
- (S) Suspended
- (I) Ineligible
- (W) Walk-on
- Injured
- Current redshirt

== Schedule and results ==
| Date time, TV | Rank^{#} | Opponent^{#} | Result | Record | Site city, state |
|---|---|---|---|---|---|
| Nov 17, 2000* | | Greenville | W 107-55 | 1–0 | Nutter Center; Fairborn, OH |
| Nov 21, 2000* | | at Northern Illinois | W 73-66 | 2-0 | Chick Evans Field House; DeKalb, IL |
| Nov 28, 2000* | | Alabama A&M | W 73-66 | 3-0 | Nutter Center; Fairborn, OH |
| Dec 2, 2000* | | Tennessee State | W 84-74 | 4-0 | Gentry Complex; Nashville, TN |
| Dec 4, 2000* | | at South Alabama | L 71-79 | 4–1 | Mitchell Center; Mobile, AL |
| Dec 7, 2000* | | Prairie View A&M | W 85–60 | 5–1 | Nutter Center; Fairborn, OH |
| Dec 11, 2000 | | at Green Bay | W 68-67 | 6-1 (1–0) | Brown County Veterans Memorial Arena; Green Bay, WI |
| Dec 16, 2000* | | High Point | W 80–38 | 7–1 | Nutter Center; Fairborn, OH |
| Dec 19, 2000* | | Miami Ohio | W 56-47 | 8–1 | Nutter Center; Fairborn, OH |
| Dec 21, 2000* | | St. Francis (PA) | W 94-66 | 9–1 | DeGol Arena; Loretto, PA |
| Dec 27, 2000* | | vs. Oakland | L 77-87 | 9–2 | The Palace of Auburn Hills; Auburn Hills, MI |
| Dec 30, 2000* | | No. 1 Michigan State | L 61-88 | 9-3 | Breslin Center; East Lansing, MI |
| Jan 2, 2001* | | at Morehead State | L 69–70 | 9–4 | Nutter Center; Fairborn, OH |
| Jan 6, 2001 | | Butler | W 62-61 | 10–4 (2–0) | Nutter Center; Fairborn, OH |
| Jan 11, 2001 | | Detroit Mercy | L 65–78 | 10-5 (2–1) | Nutter Center; Fairborn, OH |
| Jan 13, 2001 | | Cleveland State | W 67-58 | 11-5 (3–1) | Nutter Center; Fairborn, OH |
| Jan 18, 2001 | | at Milwaukee | L 43-56 | 11-6 (3–2) | Klotsche Center; Milwaukee, WI |
| Jan 25, 2001 | | Loyola | W 93-76 | 12-6 (4–2) | Nutter Center; Fairborn, OH |
| Jan 27, 2001 | | UIC | W 76-73 | 13-6 (5–2) | Nutter Center; Fairborn, OH |
| Jan 31, 2001* | | Texas-Pan American | W 74-69 | 14–6 | Nutter Center; Fairborn, OH |
| Feb 3, 2001 | | at Butler | L 48-59 | 14-7 (5–3) | Hinkle Fieldhouse; Indianapolis |
| Feb 8, 2001 | | at Cleveland State | L 60-77 | 14-8 (5–4) | CSU Convocation Center; Cleveland, OH |
| Feb 10, 2001 | | at Detroit Mercy | L 67–80 | 14-9 (5–5) | Calihan Hall; Detroit, MI |
| Feb 15, 2001 | | Green Bay | W 67-48 | 15-9 (6–5) | Nutter Center; Fairborn, OH |
| Feb 17, 2001 | | Milwaukee | W 75-60 | 16-9 (7–5) | Nutter Center; Fairborn, OH |
| Feb 22, 2001 | | at UIC | L 65-77 | 16-10 (7–6) | UIC Pavilion; Chicago, IL |
| Feb 24, 2001 | | at Loyola | W 62-60 | 17-10 (8–6) | Gentile Event Center; Chicago, IL |
Midwestern Collegiate Tournament
| Mar 3, 2001 | (4) | (5) Milwaukee; Quarterfinals | W 64-63 | 18-10 | Nutter Center; Fairborn, OH |
| Mar 4, 2001 | (4) | (1) Butler; Semifinals | L 58-66 | 18-11 | Nutter Center; Fairborn, OH |
*Non-conference game. ^{#}Rankings from AP Poll. (#) Tournament seedings in parentheses. MW=Midwest.

== Awards and honors ==
| Tyson Freeman | Raider Award |
| Kevin Melson | First Team All League |
| Israel Sheinfeld | Second Team All League |
| Jesse Deister | All Newcomer |
| Jesse Deister | All Newcomer Team |

== Statistics ==
| Number | Name | Games | Average | Points | Assists | Rebounds |
|---|---|---|---|---|---|---|
| 22 | Kevin Melson | 29 | 15.0 | 435 | 81 | 185 |
| 10 | Israel Sheinfeld | 29 | 14.7 | 427 | 32 | 178 |
| 33 | Jesse Deister | 29 | 13.6 | 395 | 56 | 72 |
| 00 | Vernard Hollins | 29 | 9.6 | 279 | 108 | 141 |
| 40 | Thomas Hope | 29 | 4.4 | 128 | 49 | 163 |
| 13 | Joe Bills | 29 | 4.0 | 115 | 52 | 31 |
| 52 | Bruno Petersons | 29 | 3.5 | 101 | 6 | 100 |
| 20 | Marcus May | 14 | 2.9 | 40 | 6 | 8 |
| 21 | Michael Doles | 18 | 2.8 | 51 | 6 | 25 |
| 12 | Tyson Freeman | 29 | 2.5 | 73 | 23 | 31 |
| 3 | Braden Bushman | 13 | 1.5 | 19 | 4 | 8 |
