= Jermaine Guice =

American basketball player

Personal information
- Born: September 2, 1972 (age 54) Columbus, Ohio, U.S.
- Listed height: 6 ft 4 in (1.93 m)
- Listed weight: 194 lb (88 kg)

Career information
- High school: Westerville South (Westerville, Ohio)
- College: Butler (1990–1994)
- NBA draft: 1994: undrafted
- Playing career: 1994–2008
- Position: Shooting guard

Career history
- 1994–1995: Pittsburgh Piranhas
- 1995: Rapid City Thrillers
- 1995: Atlético CP
- 1996: Connecticut Pride
- 1996: Shreveport Storm
- 1996: Treasure Coast Tropics
- 1996–1998: Maccabi Kiryat Motzkin
- 1999: La Crosse Bobcats
- 1999–2000: Ironi Hadera
- 2000–2001: Trenton Shooting Stars
- 2001–2002: Elitzur Kiryat Ata
- 2002: Elitzur Ashkelon
- 2002–2005: STB Le Havre
- 2005–2006: Le Mans
- 2006–2008: Élan Chalon

Career highlights
- LNB Pro A champion (2006); Semaine des As winner (2006); LNB Pro A MVP (2005); 3× LNB Pro A All-Star (2003–2004, 2006); Liga Leumit MVP (1997); First-team All-MCC (1994); Second-team All-MCC (1993); MCC All-Newcomer team (1991)

Jermaine Edward Guice (born September 2, 1972) is an American former professional basketball player. He played high school basketball at Westerville South High School in Westerville, Ohio, and played college basketball with the Butler Bulldogs, staying for four years and leading the team in scoring for two consecutive seasons. After going undrafted in the 1994 NBA draft, he started his professional career in the Continental Basketball Association. After playing in Portugal and Israel as well as in minor leagues in the United States, Guice moved to France where he was a three-time All-Star selection, MVP in 2005 and won the league title in 2006.

== High school career ==
Guice was born in Columbus, Ohio and attended Westerville South High School in nearby Westerville, where he was a multi-sport athlete: he was part of the varsity basketball, soccer (where he played in the defender position) and track teams. In his senior year of high school he earned all-state honors in all three sports. While playing for the basketball team he averaged 19.1 points, 7.6 assists, 4.1 rebounds and 4.1 steals per game and was a first-team all-state selection and District III Player of the Year.

== College career ==
Guice was recruited since his junior year at Westerville South by Butler's head coach Barry Collier and assistant coach Jay John, who personally attended some of Guice's games in high school. Guice signed to play for Butler in mid-November 1989, preferring the Bulldogs to Yale and St. Peter's, the other two programs that showed interest in signing him. In his freshman year Guice played as the team's sixth man, and averaged 10.3 points, 2.3 rebounds and 1.2 assists per game, ranking fifth on the team in both scoring and rebounding. At the end of the season he was named in the MCC All-Newcomer team.

In his sophomore season Guice entered the starting lineup, and received increased playing time, a team-high 37.3 minutes per game. He missed 7 games due to a broken hand, and finished the season as the team's second best scorer (12.4 points per game) behind senior guard Darin Archbold, and also improved his assist numbers to 2.8 per game, which ranked him second on the team behind Tim Bowen.

With the graduation of Archbold, Guice was named team captain and took up the majority of the scoring load for the Bulldogs, averaging a team-high 13.4 field goal attempts per game, and he led the team in scoring with 17.3 points per game. He also ranked second on the team in assists per game (1.9) and steals per game (1.2), trailing Tim Bowen in both categories. He was named in the All-MCC Tournament team, team MVP and was a second-team All-MCC selection.

Guice's senior season saw him again being named the team captain, and he averaged career-highs in all shooting categories (his free throw percentage of 77.4 led the conference), and a career high in points per game with 18.2, which made him the 4th best scorer in the MCC. He was the best scorer on the team, the second best assistman with a 2.6 average (behind Travis Trice Sr.), and he led the Bulldogs in steals per game with 1.3. He finished the season as an All-Tournament selection, team MVP, and was named in the All-MCC first team.

Guice retired as the 6th best scorer in Butler history with 1,607 points, and is ranked 10th as of 2019. In 2011 he was inducted in the Butler Athletics Hall of Fame.

=== College statistics ===
Year	Team	GP	GS	MPG	FG%	3P%	FT%	RPG	APG	SPG	BPG	PPG
1990–91	Butler	22			.408	.370	.720	2.3	1.2	1.1	0.1	10.3
1991–92	Butler	24	19	37.3	.452	.362	.645	3.4	2.8	1.8	0.1	12.4
1992–93	Butler	28			.447	.307	.763	4.1	1.9	1.2	0.0	17.3
1993–94	Butler	29			.486	.373	.774	4.0	2.6	1.3	0.0	18.2
Career		110			.451	.351	.742	3.5	2.1	1.3	0.1	14.6

== Professional career ==
After his senior season at Butler, Guice was automatically eligible for the 1994 NBA draft, but he was not selected by any franchise. He joined the Indiana Pacers rookie free agent camp in July 1994 and practiced with the team but he was not included in the final roster. He then decided to join the Pittsburgh Piranhas, a Continental Basketball Association team which had drafted him in the fifth round (80th overall) in the 1994 CBA draft. He played 31 games with the team (5 starts), averaging 5.5 points, 1.4 rebounds and 2.5 assists per game in 14.1 minutes per game before moving to the Rapid City Thrillers mid-season: with the Thrillers he played 17 regular season games (shooting 42.9% from three) and 1 postseason game.

In 1995 Guice moved to Europe and joined Portuguese team Atlético Clube de Portugal, where he averaged 21.4 points per game before coming back to the United States, joining the Connecticut Pride in the CBA, where he averaged 5 points per game in 4 appearances, and then signed with the Shreveport Storm in Shreveport, Louisiana, where he received limited playing time (8.2 minutes) and averaged 2.2 points per game. Guice had a brief experience with the Treasure Coast Tropics of the United States Basketball League in 1996. He moved to Israel for the 1996–97 season and joined Liga Leumit team Maccabi Kiryat Motzkin, playing two seasons and being named the league MVP in 1997. He played in the Israeli top level in the 1997–98 season, averaging 17.7 points, 3.1 rebounds and 2.6 assists. In January 1999 he signed for the La Crosse Bobcats, returning to the CBA, and in 27 games he averaged 8 points, 2.3 rebound and 2.6 assists on 22 minutes per game.

In 1999 he played with Ironi Hadera of the Israeli second tier, and he then joined the Trenton Shooting Stars of the International Basketball Association in November 2000. In 2001 he returned to the Israeli top level playing for Elitzur Kiryat Ata: in 18 games he averaged 18 points, 2.8 rebounds and 3 assists per game. He stayed with the team for the 2001–02 season, averaging 22.2 points in 25 games.

In 2002 Guice moved to France, and he signed for Pro A team STB Le Havre. In 30 games he averaged 17.8 points, 3.4 rebounds and 4.1 assists per game, and was named in the All-Star team; he was confirmed for the following season, during which he improved his scoring average to 18 points per game, and shot 40.5% from three. In 2004 he had his best scoring year in France, averaging 19.7 points per game along with 4.5 rebounds, 5.6 assists and 2.7 steals on a career-high 39.1 minutes per game. In 2005 he joined Le Mans, where he had the chance to debut at international level while playing in the 2005–06 ULEB Cup. He appeared in 10 ULEB Cup games, averaging 9.8 points, 2.3 rebounds and 3.8 assists per game. At the end of the season Guice won the Pro A title with Le Mans, along with the Semaine des As.

In 2006 Guice was signed by Élan Chalon, where he again had the chance to compete in the ULEB Cup: in the 2007–08 edition he played 12 games with averages of 5.8 points, 3.8 rebounds and 3.3 assists. He retired in 2008 after the end of the 2007–08 LNB Pro A season.
