= Hoopeston Wind Farm =

Wind farm in Illinois, United States

- Country: USA
- Coordinates: 40°22′59″N 87°47′17.9″W
- Status: Active
- Owner: Apex Wind Energy

Wind farm
- Type: Onshore
- Rotor diameter: diameter 100 m

Power generation
- Units operational: 49 x 2.0 mW
- Make and model: Vestas V100/2000
- Storage capacity: 98 MW

The Hoopeston Wind Farm is a 49-turbine wind farm in northern Vermilion County in Illinois. Investment capital for the project was organized by IKEA, which did so to earn clean-energy tax credits for the stores that it operates. IKEA hired Apex Clean Energy to build the complex.

== Detail ==
The Hoopeston complex's 49 wind turbines, each rated at 2.0 mW, can generate up to 98.0 megawatts of electricity. The Hoopeston-area project was constructed by Apex Clean Energy, and became operational in 2015.
