= Cornjerker =

Term for agricultural workers who harvested before modern machinery

A cornjerker is a laborer who harvested crops in times before modern machinery, when corn ears were picked, pulled or jerked from the stalk. The leaves were shucked off and the golden ears were thrown in a wooden wagon pulled by a team of mules. This was called "cornjerking". In other parts of the United States, this harvesting process may have been known as corn snapping, corn shucking, or corn husking.

The invention of the corn picking machine has made this hand harvesting process obsolete. By using modern machines, a farmer is capable of tending larger fields, thus producing more food with less effort. As a result, the term Cornjerker as used in the agricultural industry has become a colloquialism.

== Hoopeston ==
Hoopeston, Illinois has long been known as the "Sweetcorn Capital of the World." In the 1920s the term Cornjerker was first applied to the athletic teams of the school just as the Pittsburgh Steelers got their name from that town's steel-mills. Bob Poisall, a sports writer for the Commercial-News (Danville, Illinois), is credited with first coining the team name. From the information available, the name was a joke that stuck.

In the fall, the team buses to games were often late in leaving because the teams' members were still in the fields jerking corn. Per the custom at that time, Mr. Poisall was riding the team bus in order to cover the game for his newspaper. In exasperation on one of these occasions, he told them they would never get anywhere, they were just a bunch of cornjerkers. Glenn Brasel, coach of Hoopeston High School from 1922 through 1946, must have liked the term and felt it would be an appropriate team name. The emblem of an ear of corn first appeared on the team uniform in 1930. In 1963, the mascot known as "Jerky" was born. This walking ear of corn was created by coach and athletic director at that time, Dick Hobbs.

Cornjerkers come in all shapes and sexes. Brawny football players, lanky basketball players, speedy track team members, petite cheerleaders - all of these students are Cornjerkers. Coaches, faculty, and fans are also a part of the Cornjerkers.

Originally, Cornjerkers were from Hoopeston. One of their rivals were the East Lynn Hornets. In 1973, the Hornets were turned into Cornjerkers - Hoopeston and East Lynn schools consolidated. Later, with the addition of nearby towns Cheneyville, East Lynn, Wellington and Rankin, the name was changed to its current form, "Hoopeston Area".

On March 16, 1985, the best known Cornjerkers were members of the varsity basketball team. The team was ranked number three in the state of Illinois in Class A basketball. According to Don Dukes, then-Mayor of Hoopeston, " After this past weekend, there should not be anyone in the state of Illinois who doesn't know what a Cornjerker is and where one comes from."

== Notable former Cornjerkers ==
- Thad Matta, 1980s Cornjerker basketball star and former NCAA head men's basketball coach (Ohio State)
- Herb Neathery, Hoopeston High School class of 1948, went on to play NCAA class football at the University of Illinois. Herb was on the Illini team that beat Stanford 40-7 in the 1952 Rose Bowl. Neathery was drafted by the Cleveland Browns.
- Scott Eells, Hoopeston-East Lynn High School class of 1975, went on to play NCAA basketball at Indiana University. Scott played for the Hoosiers during their undefeated 1975-76 NCAA Championship season.
