= Thad Matta =

American basketball coach (born 1967)

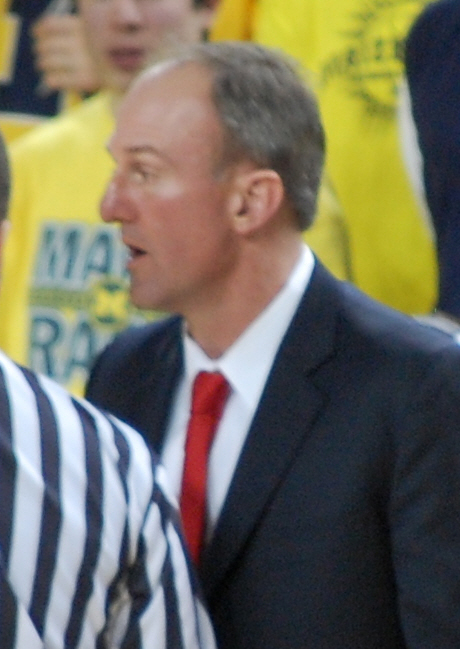
- Matta in 2009

Current position
- Title: Special asst. to the president and athletic director
- Team: Butler
- Conference: Big East

Biographical details
- Born: July 11, 1967 (age 59); Hoopeston, Illinois, U.S.

Playing career
- 1985–1986: Southern Illinois
- 1987–1990: Butler

Coaching career (HC unless noted)
- 1990–1991: Indiana State (assistant)
- 1991–1994: Butler (assistant)
- 1994–1995: Miami (OH) (assistant)
- 1995–1996: Western Carolina (assistant)
- 1996–1997: Miami (OH) (assistant)
- 1997–2000: Butler (assistant)
- 2000–2001: Butler
- 2001–2004: Xavier
- 2004–2017: Ohio State
- 2022–2026: Butler

Administrative career (AD unless noted)
- 2021–2022: Indiana (Assoc. AD)
- 2026–Present: Butler (Special Asst. to AD)

Head coaching record
- Overall: 502–223 (.692)
- Tournaments: 24–13 (NCAA Division I); 6–2 (NIT); 1–1 (CBC)

Accomplishments and honors

Championships
- 2 NCAA Division I regional – Final Four (2007, 2012); NIT (2008); MCC tournament (2001); MCC regular season (2001); 2 A-10 tournament (2002, 2004); 2 A-10 regular season (2002, 2003); 4 Big Ten tournament (2007, 2010, 2011, 2013); 5 Big Ten regular season (2006, 2007, 2010–2012)

Awards
- MCC Coach of the Year (2001); A-10 Coach of the Year (2002); 3× Big Ten Coach of the Year (2006, 2007, 2010)

Thad Michael Matta (born July 11, 1967) is a former American college basketball coach who was most recently in his second stint as head coach of the Butler Bulldogs men's basketball team, having been head coach of the Bulldogs for the 2000–01 season. From 2004 to 2017, Matta led the Ohio State Buckeyes to five Big Ten Conference regular season championships (2006, 2007, 2010, 2011 and 2012), four Big Ten tournament titles (2007, 2010, 2011 and 2013), two Final Four appearances (2007 and 2012), and the 2008 NIT Championship. He is the winningest coach in Ohio State history.

Before returning to Butler, Matta spent a season (2021–22) as the Associate Athletic Director for Indiana and the men's basketball team.

== Playing career ==
A basketball standout for the Cornjerkers at Hoopeston-East Lynn High School in Hoopeston, Illinois, Matta was a two-year starter for the Butler University Bulldogs in three seasons after transferring from Southern Illinois University as a sophomore. He led Butler in assists (100) and three-point field goal percentage (.433) in 1987–88 and in free-throw percentage in 1988–89 (.872). He served as a team captain (one of the Butler tri-captains that year) on Barry Collier's first team in 1989–90 and finished his career in sixth place on Butler's all-time list for free-throw percentage (.800). He earned a B.S. degree from Butler in 1990. Matta enjoyed his Butler career-high point total of 21 points against Xavier University at the Cincinnati Gardens on March 2, 1989.

== Early coaching years ==
In total, Matta spent six seasons as a full-time assistant coach at three different universities, helping his squads compile a composite 128–58 (.688) record and make six postseason tournament appearances. He was on the bench in five consecutive conference tournament championship games and won four league tournament championship rings. He was in the NCAA tournament five times as an assistant under four different head coaches and in the postseason National Invitation Tournament once.

Matta began his coaching career at Indiana State University as a graduate assistant under head coach Tates Locke in 1990–91. Matta served as an academic coordinator and administrative assistant at Butler (1991–94) before moving into the full-time coaching ranks.

Matta took his first full-time assistant coaching position under Herb Sendek at Miami University (Ohio) in 1994–95 and helped Miami to a 23–7 record, a Mid-American Conference regular-season championship and a first-round win in the NCAA tournament.

The following year, Matta accepted a coaching position at Western Carolina University under Phil Hopkins and helped the Catamounts to a 17–13 record, the school's first winning record in 10 years. Western Carolina captured the Southern Conference tournament championship and advanced to the NCAA tournament as a 16 seed, very nearly upsetting 1-seed Purdue in the round of 64. Matta returned to Miami under new head coach Charlie Coles in 1996–97 and helped the RedHawks to a 21–9 record, the MAC regular season and tournament championships and a berth in the NCAA tournament.

Matta rejoined Butler University's staff in 1997 and helped the Bulldogs to three consecutive 20-win seasons. He established himself as one of the nation's best young coaching prospects during a six-year assistant coaching stint. In his three seasons as Barry Collier's top assistant, Butler compiled a 67–29 (.698) record, won two Midwestern Collegiate Conference tournament championships and one MCC regular-season title, made two NCAA tournament appearances and earned one NIT berth. He served as Butler's primary recruiter.

== Head coaching ==
=== Butler ===
Matta took over as head coach of Butler when Barry Collier left after the 1999–2000 season to coach at the University of Nebraska. Matta was named 2000–01 Midwestern Collegiate Conference Coach of the Year in his first and only season as head coach at Butler, after leading the Bulldogs to a school record 24 wins. He was also named National "Rookie Coach of the Year" by CBS SportsLine.com and College Insider.com.

Butler was 24–8 under Matta's direction that year with an 11–3 record and an MCC regular season championship, a MCC tournament championship and an appearance in the second round of the NCAA tournament. Butler won 13 of its last 15 games. Eventual NCAA runner-up Arizona ended the Butler run in the second round of the NCAA tournament.

=== Xavier ===
At Xavier, Matta led the Musketeers to three consecutive 26-win seasons, back-to-back Atlantic 10 Conference regular-season championships in 2002 and 2003 and two league tournament titles in 2002 and 2004. Xavier advanced to three NCAA tournaments, including an Elite Eight appearance in 2004 following two second-round trips.

Matta's 26 wins for the 2002–03 season marked the highest win total ever for a second-year Xavier head coach. He also broke the school record for most victories by a Xavier rookie head coach. Xavier's 26–6 record in the 2001–02 campaign set the record.

Matta was named 2002 Atlantic 10 Conference Coach of the Year, while leading the Musketeers to the top regular season finish in the league at 14–2 and an Atlantic 10 Conference tournament championship. In addition, Matta became the only first-year coach in conference history to ever win both the A–10 regular season and tourney championships.

=== Ohio State ===
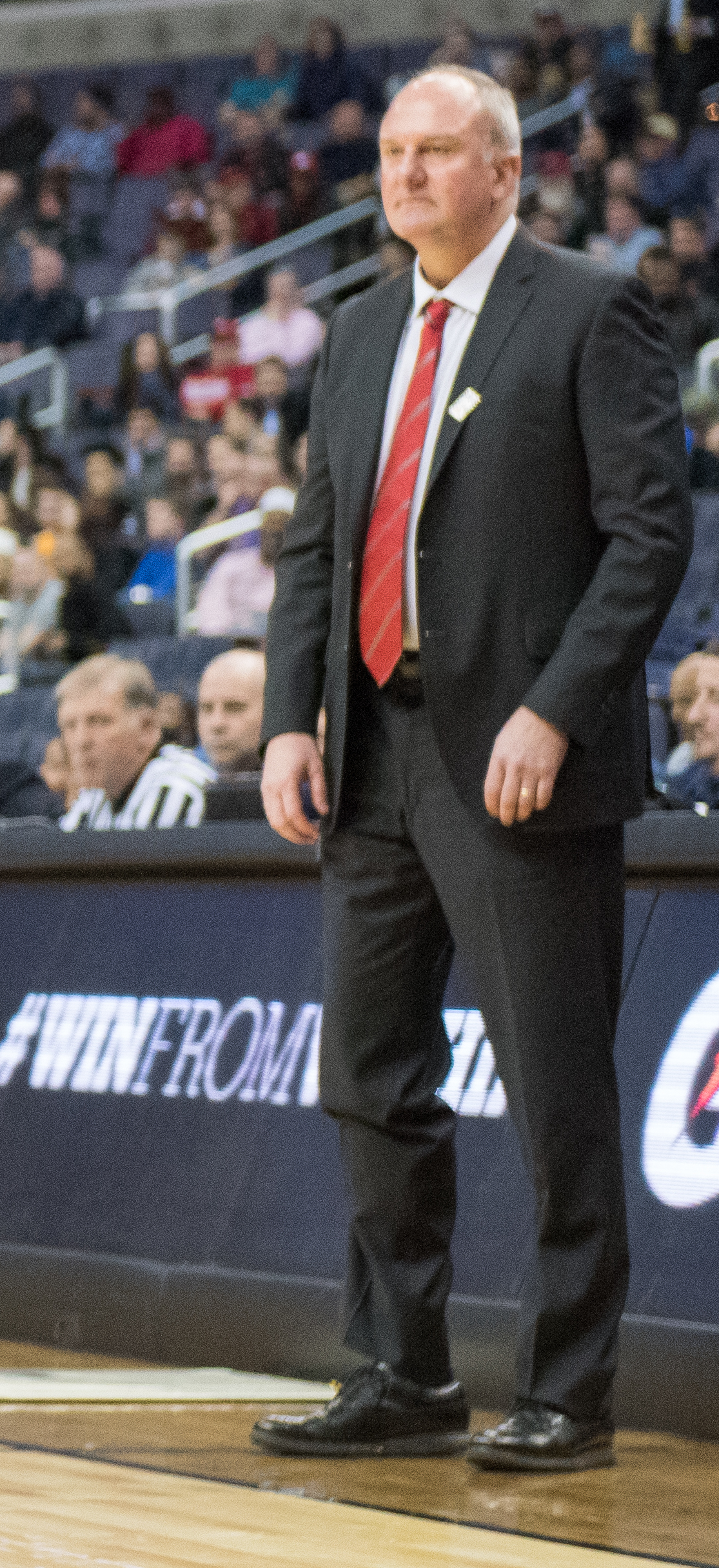
Matta in 2017

Matta, a finalist for the 2002–03 Naismith National Coach of the Year Award, was hired as the 13th head coach in Ohio State history on July 7, 2004, after the school had fired previous coach Jim O'Brien. No time was wasted preparing for his first season in Columbus, which culminated in a 65–64 victory over undefeated and top–ranked University of Illinois in the regular-season finale at Value City Arena before a packed house and a national television audience. The Buckeyes' final record for the 2004–05 campaign was 20–12, but did not include any postseason play, as the team was ineligible.

In the 2005–06 season Matta led the Buckeyes to an outright Big Ten Championship for the first time since 1992, finishing one game ahead of Iowa and Illinois. The Buckeyes' season came to an end during the second round of the NCAA tournament when they lost to Georgetown on March 19, 2006. Their final overall record was 26–6. The Buckeyes were thought to be a year away from competing for the league crown, as they were to add a highly regarded recruiting class, dubbed the "Thad Five", led by center Greg Oden of Lawrence North High School in Indianapolis for the 2006–07 season. The Buckeyes did win the Big Ten and Matta led Ohio State all the way to the national championship game, where they lost to defending national champion Florida.

In the 2007–08 season, Matta's Buckeyes did not make the NCAA tournament. However, they won the 2008 NIT championship, despite playing with four new starters for the second consecutive year.

In 2009, Ohio State went to the NCAA Tournament, but were eliminated in the first round by Siena. In 2010, the Buckeyes won a share of the Big Ten and the 2010 conference tournament title. In the NCAA tournament they beat UC–Santa Barbara in the first round 68–51. The next round they beat Georgia Tech 75–66, but went on to lose to Tennessee in the Sweet 16.

In the 2010–11 season, Matta's Buckeyes were 29–2, ranked #1 in all polls (16–2 in conference play), and won the outright Big Ten Championship. The Buckeyes beat Penn State on March 13 to win their 2nd consecutive Big Ten tournament title. The Buckeyes were the overall number one seed in the 2011 NCAA tournament and the number one seed in the Eastern bracket, where the Buckeyes won two games in Cleveland before losing to eventual Eastern regional champion Kentucky.

In the 2011–12 season, Matta led Ohio State to its third straight Big Ten championship, shared with Michigan and Michigan State. Ohio State advanced to the Final Four for the second time in Matta's career, before losing to Kansas in a game the Buckeyes led by nine at halftime.

In the 2012–13 season, Ohio State finished second in the Big Ten regular season, one game behind league champion Indiana. The Buckeyes went on to win the Big Ten tournament in Chicago, which was Matta's fourth Big Ten tournament championship. The Buckeyes were a 2 seed in the 2013 NCAA tournament. They lost in the Elite Eight to Wichita State.

On March 12, 2015, Matta set a school record for victories, winning his 298th game for OSU after defeating Minnesota in the Big Ten tournament.

On June 5, 2017, Matta mutually agreed with Ohio State to step down as its head coach due to health issues that were causing a decline in team performance and recruiting. His final season at Ohio State was the first time in Matta's entire career that he failed to achieve at least 20 wins.

=== Back to Butler ===
Matta coaching at Butler in 2024

On April 3, 2022, it was announced that Butler hired Matta as head coach to replace LaVall Jordan.

On March 16, 2026, Matta announced his retirement from coaching, saying he'll remain with Butler as a special assistant to the university president and athletic director.

== Head coaching record ==
Record table
Season	Team	Overall	Conference	Standing	Postseason
Butler Bulldogs (Midwestern Collegiate Conference) (2000–2001)
2000–01	Butler	24–8	11–3	1st	NCAA Division I Round of 32
Xavier Musketeers (Atlantic 10 Conference) (2001–2004)
2001–02	Xavier	26–6	14–2	1st	NCAA Division I Round of 32
2002–03	Xavier	26–6	15–1	1st	NCAA Division I Round of 32
2003–04	Xavier	26–11	10–6	T–4th	NCAA Division I Elite Eight
Xavier:		78–23 (.772)	39–9 (.813)		
Ohio State Buckeyes (Big Ten Conference) (2004–2017)
2004–05	Ohio State	20–12	8–8	6th	
2005–06	Ohio State	26–6	12–4	1st	NCAA Division I Round of 32
2006–07	Ohio State	35–4	15–1	1st	NCAA Division I Runner-up
2007–08	Ohio State	24–13	10–8	5th	NIT Champion
2008–09	Ohio State	22–11	10–8	T–4th	NCAA Division I Round of 64
2009–10	Ohio State	29–8	14–4	T–1st	NCAA Division I Sweet 16
2010–11	Ohio State	34–3	16–2	1st	NCAA Division I Sweet 16
2011–12	Ohio State	31–8	13–5	T–1st	NCAA Division I Final Four
2012–13	Ohio State	29–8	13–5	T–2nd	NCAA Division I Elite Eight
2013–14	Ohio State	25–10	10–8	5th	NCAA Division I Round of 64
2014–15	Ohio State	24–11	11–7	6th	NCAA Division I Round of 32
2015–16	Ohio State	21–14	11–7	7th	NIT Second Round
2016–17	Ohio State	17–15	7–11	T–10th	
Ohio State:		337–123 (.733)	150–78 (.658)		
Butler Bulldogs (Big East Conference) (2022–2026)
2022–23	Butler	14–18	6–14	9th	
2023–24	Butler	18–15	9–11	T–8th	NIT First Round
2024–25	Butler	15–20	6–14	T–8th	CBC Quarterfinal
2025–26	Butler	16–16	7–13	T–7th	
Butler:		87–77 (.530)	39–55 (.415)		
Total:		502–223 (.692)			
National champion Postseason invitational champion Conference regular season champion Conference regular season and conference tournament champion Division regular season champion Division regular season and conference tournament champion Conference tournament champion

== See also ==
- List of NCAA Division I Men's Final Four appearances by coach
