= James L. Zink =

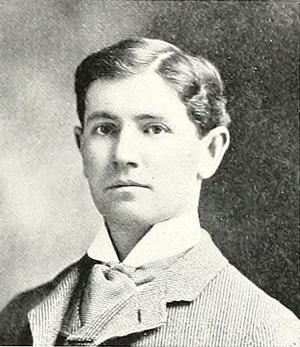
- Zink pictured in The Drift 1899, Butler yearbook

Biographical details
- Born: 1870; Johnson County, Missouri, U.S.
- Died: October 2, 1937 (aged 67); Indianapolis, Indiana, U.S.
- Education: Vanderbilt University

Coaching career (HC unless noted)

Football
- 1897: Butler

Basketball
- 1897–1899: Butler

Administrative career (AD unless noted)
- 1891–1893: Indiana
- 1895: DePauw
- 1895–1898: Butler

Head coaching record
- Overall: 3–0 (football); 2–5 (basketball)

James Lilly Zink (1870 – October 2, 1937) was an athletic director at Indiana University and DePauw University as well as one of the first head coaches of the basketball and football teams at Butler University.

== Biography ==
Reported to have been from Greencastle, Indiana, Zink was an 1891 graduate of the School of Gymnastics at Vanderbilt University. From 1891 to 1893, he was an instructor in gymnastics and athletics at Indiana University where he held the title of Director of the Men's Gymnasium within the Department of Physical Training. (Note: One source states that he started at Indiana University in 1890, however, this conflicts with another source that states he was at Vanderbilt University until 1891.) (Note: The University of Chicago Annual Register July, 1898 - July, 1889 notes his position Indiana University as "Physical Director".) At Indiana, he was a member of the Pi Chapter of the Beta Theta Pi fraternity. (Note: According to an 1899 directory of the fraternity's members, Zink was in the class of 1896 but never received a degree from IU. An earlier source of the fraternity placed him in the class of 1895.) Zink was succeeded as IU's Director of the Men's Gymnasium by E.C. Syrett in 1893, then was the Physical Director at the YMCA in Alton, Illinois from 1893 to 1894. In 1895, he was the director of athletics at DePauw University.

From 1895 to 1898, Zink was the director of physical culture at Butler College in Irvington, Indiana. (Note: A notice placed in The Indiana Medical Journal stated he served as the physical director at Butler for four years.) In 1897, Zink took over as the head coach of the university's football team. In his only season at the helm, Butler went undefeated in three games. Zink was also the head coach of the men's basketball team at Butler from 1897 to 1899. Over two seasons, he compiled a record of two victories and five defeats.

After resigning his position in 1899, Zink opened an office in Indianapolis for the practice of "medical gymnastics". In 1902, he advertised himself as a "medical gymnast" specializing in "Hygienic and Corrective Gymnastics, Massage and Hydrotherapy". Zink's was mentioned as a third-party in the appeal of a personal injury case brought before the Indiana Supreme Court in 1910. He was noted in the judgement to be the superintendent of the Zink Gymnasium and Orthopedic Institute. A 1901 issue of American Medicine listed Zink as a "stockholder and subscriber" of the journal.

The United States Patent Office granted Zink a patent for an arch support in 1920 and one for an adjustable hanger for brooms or mops in 1932.

Zink died on October 2, 1937, at St. Vincent's Hospital in Indianapolis.

== Head coaching record ==
=== Football ===
Year	Team	Overall	Conference	Standing	Bowl/playoffs
Butler Christians (Independent) (1897)
1897	Butler	3–0			
Butler:		3–0			
Total:		3–0			

=== Basketball ===
Record table
Season	Team	Overall	Conference	Standing	Postseason
Butler Christians (Independent) (1897–1899)
1897–98	Butler	2–3			
1898–99	Butler	0–2			
Indiana:		2–5			
Total:		2–5			
