= Brandon Polk =

American basketball player (born 1984)

No. 29 – Casey Cavaliers
- Position: Power forward
- League: Big V

Personal information
- Born: January 9, 1984 (age 42) Fort Worth, Texas
- Listed height: 200 cm (6 ft 7 in)

Career information
- High school: Wichita North (Wichita, Kansas)
- College: Redlands CC (2002–2004); Butler (2004–2006)
- NBA draft: 2006: undrafted
- Playing career: 2006–present

Career history
- 2006–2007: Benetton Fribourg
- 2008–2009: Kauhajoen Karhu
- 2010: Hobart Chargers
- 2010: Leche Río Breogán
- 2010–2011: Lobe Huesca
- 2012–2013: Hobart Chargers
- 2014–2015: Frankston Blues
- 2016: Knox Raiders
- 2017–present: Casey Cavaliers

Career highlights
- Big V All-Star Five (2016); 2× All-SEABL Team (2012, 2013); All-SEABL South Team (2010); Finnish D1 League champion (2009); Swiss LNA champion (2009); Swiss Cup champion (2009); Horizon League Player of the Year (2006); First-team All-Horizon League (2006); Second-team All-Horizon League (2005); Horizon League All-Newcomer Team (2005)

Charles Brandon Polk (born January 9, 1984) is an American professional basketball player for the Casey Cavaliers of the Big V.

== College career ==
After spending two seasons playing for Redlands Community College between 2002 and 2004, Polk joined the Butler Bulldogs for his junior year in 2004–05. He went on to earn second-team All-Horizon League honors in 2005, as well as Horizon League All-Newcomer Team honors. As a senior in 2005–06, he was named the Horizon League Player of the Year and earned first-team all-conference honors. In 61 games for the Bulldogs over two seasons, Polk averaged 16.0 points, 4.6 rebounds, 1.1 assists and 1.2 blocks per game.

== Professional career ==
=== Switzerland and Finland (2006–2009) ===
After going undrafted in the 2006 NBA draft, Polk moved to Switzerland where he joined Benetton Fribourg for his rookie season in 2006–07. He helped the club win the Swiss Cup and the league championship, and in 19 games, he averaged 13.6 points, 5.4 rebounds and 1.5 steals per game.

Between August and September 2007, Polk spent time with Finnish club KTP-Basket, but ultimately did not sign with the team following a try-out period. He returned to the country a year later for the 2008–09 season, joining Kauhajoen Karhu. He helped Kauhajoen win the league championship that season, and in 27 games for the club, he averaged 16.6 points, 8.8 rebounds, 1.8 assists and 1.1 steals per game.

=== Hobart Chargers (2010) ===
In 2010, Polk moved to Australia where he joined the Hobart Chargers of the South East Australian Basketball League. He earned All-SEABL South team honors in his first season with the club after averaging 21.0 points, 10.4 rebounds and 1.6 assists in 30 games.

=== Spain and injury (2010–2011) ===
Between October 2010 and January 2011, Polk played in Spain for Leche Río Breogán (seven games) and Lobe Huesca (six games).

Due to injury, Polk was forced to sit out the majority of 2011, including missing the 2011 SEABL season and a chance to play in Slovakia for MBK Rieker Komárno.

=== Second Hobart Chargers stint (2012–2013) ===
In 2012, Polk re-joined the Hobart Chargers. At the season's end, he finished seventh in the MVP voting and was named to the 10-man All-Star SEABL team. In 29 games for the Chargers in 2012, he averaged 19.1 points, 8.3 rebounds and 2.1 assists per game.

Polk returned to Hobart for the 2013 SEABL season and led the Chargers to a third-place finish in the South Conference with a 15–13 record, as he was again named to the 10-man All-Star SEABL team. In 30 games for the Chargers in 2013, he averaged a career-high 22.2 points, 11.2 rebounds and 2.4 assists per game, while shooting an impressive 59.8% from the field. Despite wanting to return to the Chargers in 2014, negotiations on a new contract resulted in a standstill, leading to Polk parting ways with the club.

=== Frankston Blues (2014–2015) ===
In December 2013, Polk signed with the Frankston Blues for the 2014 SEABL season. In 26 games for the Blues in 2014, he averaged 20.0 points, 9.8 rebounds and 2.6 assists per game.

On March 5, 2015, Polk re-signed with the Blues for the 2015 season. In 22 games for the Blues in 2015, he averaged 15.3 points, 10.0 rebounds and 3.0 assists per game.

=== Knox Raiders (2016) ===
On March 8, 2016, Polk signed with the Knox Raiders for the 2016 Big V season. He appeared in 20 out of the team's 22 regular season games and helped them finish fourth on the ladder with a 16–6 record. In their Elimination Final game against the fifth-seeded Eltham Wildcats on August 7, they were defeated 85–82. In 21 games for the Raiders in 2016, Polk averaged 18.5 points per game. He subsequently earned Big V All-Star Five honors.

=== Casey Cavaliers (2017–2019) ===
On November 17, 2016, Polk signed with the Casey Cavaliers for the 2017 [Big V]
