= Rylan Hainje =

American basketball player

Personal information
- Born: March 9, 1980 (age 46) Lafayette, Indiana
- Listed height: 6 ft 6 in (1.98 m)
- Listed weight: 235 lb (107 kg)

Career information
- High school: Cathedral (Indianapolis, Indiana)
- College: Butler (1998–2002)
- NBA draft: 2002: undrafted
- Playing career: 2002–2005
- Position: Shooting guard

Career history
- 2002–2003: Körmend
- 2003–2004: Levallois Basket
- 2004–2005: Gary Steelheads

Career highlights
- Horizon League Player of the Year (2002)

Rylan Hainje (born March 9, 1980) is an American basketball player. A forward and shooting guard, Hainje was named Horizon League Player of the Year in 2002. Hainje joined the Butler Bulldogs beginning the 1998–99 season after graduating from and playing basketball and football at Cathedral High School in Indianapolis. Upon graduating from Butler, Hainje played professionally in Europe and in the United States as part of the International Basketball League until 2005.

== High school ==
As a two-sport athlete at Cathedral High School, Hainje helped lead his high school to Indiana High School Athletic Association state championships in both football and basketball. He was both the leading scorer and rebounder on Cathedral team which won the Indiana 3A state basketball title in 1997–98, and was named to the all-sectional, all-regional, all-semistate and all-state tournament teams. In his final season with Cathedral, Hainje averaged 16.8 points and 9.0 rebounds, 2.5 assists, and 1.9 steals per game and was named Indianapolis "City Player of the Year". He was also the starting tight end on Cathedral's state championship football team in 1996.

== College ==
Hainje was one of two freshmen to play in all 32 games and was a starter in Butler's final 28 games, finishing as the team's second-leading rebounder and third-leading scorer as he scored in double-figures in 10 games. He was named to the 1999 Midwestern Collegiate Conference (MCC) All-Newcomer team. In the 1999 NIT, Hainje shared Butler's scoring lead with 15 points against Old Dominion.

In his sophomore season, Hainje played in all 31 games, including 28 as a starter. He finished second on the team in minutes played, scoring, and rebounding, and third in assists while he was ranked eighth in the MCC in steals. In the MCC championship gamed, Hainje posted 11 points and a team-high eight rebounds.

In his junior season, Hainje started all 32 games, was named to the MCC All-Defensive Team, earned a spot on the MCC All-Tournament team, became the first player since 1997–98 to lead Butler in scoring in three consecutive games (Evansville, Indiana State and UNC-Wilmington), the first Butler player since '97–98 to post back-to-back 20-point performances (Evansville and Indiana State), led the Bulldogs with five 20-point efforts, finished second on the team in rebounding and field goal shooting, and ranked fifth in the conference in field goal shooting. He scored in double-figures in 16 games, including 15 points against #23 Wake Forest in the first round of the NCAA Tournament. Notably, Hainje had team-highs of 18 points and six rebounds against Arizona in the Fiesta Bowl Classic, less than four hours after being treated at a hospital for flu-like symptoms.

During his senior season, Hainje again played in all 32 games, starting 31 and earning a career highs in points per game (15.2), rebounds per game (6.0)and free throw percentage (71.6%). During the season, Hainje led Butler to its first victory over Purdue since 1954 as he scored 25 points in a 74–68 victory. At the culmination of the season, he was named the 2002 Horizon League Player of the Year.

== Professional career ==
After graduating from Butler, Hainje considered a return to football as an NFL tight end, and the Indianapolis Colts sent him through a private workout. He opted to continue with basketball and was a member of the Indiana Pacers Summer League Team in 2002. He next played internationally in Körmend, Hungary, where he averaged 12 points and 5 rebounds as he led his team to the Hungarian National Championship. The next season, 2003–2004, Rylan played for Levallois Basket in Roanne, France, averaging 16.5 points and 6.3 rebounds a game. In 2004, Hainje joined the Gary Steelheads, where coach Duane Ticknor described Hainje as "an explosive player with a lot of scoring punch. He does a lot of little things that might not show up in the box score but are appreciated by his teammates and the coaching staff. We are happy to have Rylan on board and are excited to see him perform when training camp opens."
