= 2001 Midwestern Collegiate Conference men's basketball tournament =

- Classification: Division I
- Season: 2000–01
- Teams: 8
- Site: Nutter Center; Dayton, Ohio
- Champions: Butler (4th title)
- Winning coach: Thad Matta (1st title)
- MVP: LaVall Jordan (Butler)

2000–01 Midwestern Collegiate Conference men's basketball standings
	Conf.				Overall
Team	W		L	PCT	W		L	PCT
Butler †	11	–	3	.786	24	–	8	.750
Detroit	10	–	4	.714	25	–	12	.676
Cleveland State	9	–	5	.643	19	–	13	.594
Wright State	8	–	6	.571	18	–	11	.621
Milwaukee	7	–	7	.500	15	–	13	.536
UIC	5	–	9	.357	11	–	17	.393
Green Bay	4	–	10	.286	11	–	17	.393
Loyola Chicago	2	–	12	.143	7	–	21	.250
† 2001 MCC tournament winner

The 2001 Midwestern Collegiate Conference men's basketball tournament took place at the end of the 2000–01 regular season. The tournament was hosted by Wright State University.

== Seeds ==
All Midwestern Collegiate Conference schools played in the tournament. Teams were seeded by 2001–02 Midwestern Collegiate Conference season record, with a tiebreaker system to seed teams with identical conference records.

== Bracket ==
Quarterfinals
1	Butler	78
8	Loyola Chicago	52
4	Wright State	64
5	Milwaukee	63
2	Detroit	66
7	Green Bay	58
3	Cleveland State	62
6	UIC	61

Semifinals
1	Butler	66
4	Wright State	58
2	Detroit	91
3	Cleveland State	81

Championship
1	Butler	53
2	Detroit	38
