= Darin Archbold =

American basketball player

Personal information
- Born: July 11, 1969 (age 57)
- Listed height: 6 ft 4 in (1.93 m)
- Listed weight: 190 lb (86 kg)

Career information
- High school: Norwell (Ossian, Indiana)
- College: Butler (1988–1992)
- NBA draft: 1992: undrafted
- Position: Shooting guard

Career highlights
- MCC Player of the Year (1991); 2× First-team All-MCC (1991, 1992)

Darin Archbold (born July 11, 1969) is an American former basketball player. Archbold was named Midwestern Collegiate Conference Player of the Year in 1991. Archbold joined the Butler Bulldogs beginning the 1988–89 season after graduating from and playing basketball and football at Norwell High School in Ossian, Indiana, where he still holds the records for career points, career rebounds, and season points.

== College ==
A four-year letterwinner and three-year starter for the Bulldogs, Archbold led Butler in scoring for three consecutive seasons and sits in fourth place on Butler's all-time scoring list with 1,744 career points. He set a Butler single season scoring record with 770 points in 1991–92, and he continues to hold Butler's all-time record for three-point field goal shooting (.465). Archbold was a two-time all-conference selection and a two-time Butler MVP. Notably, in 1991, Archbold became Butler's first men's basketball player named Horizon League (formerly Midwestern Collegiate Conference) Player of the Year. That season, he led the NCAA Division I in free throw shooting (.912) and finished second in the conference in scoring (21.8 ppg). On March 16, 1992, he was also featured as the Player of the Week by Sports Illustrated. He was named to Butler's All-Century Team in 1998 and to Butler's Team of the Sesquicentennial in 2006. Archbold was added to Butler's Hall of Fame in 2008.

Archbold is a notable figure in the Butler-Xavier basketball rivalry, as Xavier's Maurice Brantley punched Archbold while in the postgame handshake line. The Chicago Tribune reported: "Brantley`s open right hand slapped the side of Archbold`s head, which snapped back. The Butler guard, who had been frustrated and punished throughout the game, pushed back, and with that Brantley unloaded a right that bloodied Archbold`s chin." In spite of both players subsequently being placed on probation by the conference, Archbold was named the conference's player of the year. The following season, Archbold had his revenge when he scored 42 points, leading Butler to a 96–86 victory at Xavier's home arena at that time, the Cincinnati Gardens. The Bulldogs also beat Xavier six days later in the semifinals of the MCC Tournament at Cincinnati's Riverfront Coliseum. Darin said he owes his great free throw shooting to a former high school classmate, Mike Miller. He said Mike would spend his free time after lunch rebounding for him.

The June 1992 issue of Basketball Digest magazine had Archbold listed among their prospects for the 1992 NBA draft, describing him as "An explosive scorer who could be on 'the cutting edge' in the NBA." However, he was not amongst the players picked.
