= Butler Bulldogs men's basketball =

Basketball team that represents Butler University

2026–27 Butler Bulldogs men's basketball team
- University: Butler University
- First season: 1896–97; 130 years ago
- Athletic director: Grant Leiendecker
- Head coach: Ronald Nored; 1st season, 0–0 (–)
- Location: Indianapolis, Indiana
- Arena: Hinkle Fieldhouse (capacity: 9,100)
- NCAA division: Division I
- Conference: Big East
- Nickname: Bulldogs
- Colors: Blue and white
- Student section: Dawg Pound
- All-time record: 1706–1256 (.576)
- NCAA tournament record: 24–16 (.600)

NCAA Division I tournament runner-up
- 2010, 2011
Other NCAA Division I tournament results
Final Four	2010, 2011
Elite Eight	2010, 2011
Sweet Sixteen	1962, 2003, 2007, 2010, 2011, 2017
Appearances	1962, 1997, 1998, 2000, 2001, 2003, 2007, 2008, 2009, 2010, 2011, 2013, 2015, 2016, 2017, 2018

Conference tournament champions
- Horizon League: 1997, 1998, 2000, 2001, 2008, 2010, 2011

Conference regular-season champions
- MVC: 1933, 1934 MAC: 1947 ICC: 1952, 1953, 1959, 1961, 1962, 1970, 1973, 1977, 1978, Horizon League: 1997, 2000, 2001, 2002, 2003, 2007, 2008, 2009, 2010, 2011

AAU Tournament National Champions
- 1923–24

Veteran Athletes of Philadelphia National Champions
- 1928–29

Uniforms
Home	Away

The Butler Bulldogs men's basketball team represents Butler University in Indianapolis, Indiana. The school's team currently competes in the Big East Conference. They play their home games at Hinkle Fieldhouse.

== History ==
Butler won the national Amateur Athletic Union tournament in 1924, and were crowned national champions by the Veterans Athletes of Philadelphia in 1929.

The Bulldogs competed as part of the Horizon League since its founding in 1979, and played basketball in other regional conferences before that, including the Missouri Valley Conference. In 2012 they left the Horizon League for the Atlantic 10 and the year after, moved to the Big East.

Despite having played in a mid-major conference, Butler rose to national prominence in the late 1990s. They ranked in most media polls for all but a few weeks from the 2006–07 season to the 2011–12 season, and competed in the postseason every year since 1997, except for 2004, 2005, and 2014. In the 2010 NCAA tournament, Butler was the National runner-up to Duke, advancing to the National Championship Game after defeating Michigan State in the Final Four. With a total enrollment of only 4,500 students, Butler is the smallest school to play for a national championship since the tournament expanded to 64 teams in 1985. The Bulldogs also went to the championship game in the following NCAA tournament, falling to UConn after defeating VCU in the Final Four. With the victory over VCU, Butler became the first mid-major program to reach the championship game in successive seasons since 1979, when seeding of the tournament began, and the only team from the state of Indiana to reach back-to-back championship games.

After spending one season in the Atlantic 10 Conference, Butler moved into the realigned basketball-only Big East Conference for the 2013–14 season. Their first season was mediocre, finishing 9th out of 10 teams with a 14–17 record, their first losing record since 2004–05. In their second season, despite being picked to finish 7th, the Bulldogs surprised many by finishing tied for second place in the conference. Butler finished the 2015–16 season in a tie for fourth place in Big East play with a record of 21–11, 10–8 in conference and receiving a bid to the NCAA tournament where they advanced to the Second Round.

== Basketball community ==
Because of the school's history of basketball success, location in the heart of the land of "Hoosier Hysteria", and lack of a scholarship football program, the Butler University fan base is primarily basketball-oriented. Other athletics enjoy substantial followings of current students and alumni, but only basketball has garnered interest from a national audience.

Two studies estimated that television, print, and online news coverage of Butler's 2010 and 2011 appearances in the NCAA tournament championship game resulted in additional publicity for the university worth about $1.2 billion. In an example of the "Flutie effect", applications rose by 41% after the 2010 appearance. In June 2011, USA Today ranked Butler as one of the top five colleges making use of social media. Specific to basketball, Butler's mascot, Butler Blue, the men's basketball program, head coach Thad Matta, and other coaches have university-endorsed Twitter accounts. Also, online communities Butler Hoops and /r/ButlerUniversity exist to facilitate discussion among fans.

In recent years, the Butler program has also received national attention for its philosophy to the game, which it calls "The Butler Way". At its core, The Butler Way calls for complete commitment and exalts teamwork above self.

== Postseason ==
1929 national championship trophy awarded to Butler by the Veteran Athletes of Philadelphia

=== NCAA tournament results ===
The Bulldogs have appeared in 16 NCAA Tournaments. Their combined record is 24–16.

Year	Seed	Round	Opponent	Result
1962	–	First Round; Sweet Sixteen; Regional Third Place Game	Bowling Green; Kentucky; Western Kentucky	W 56–55; L 60–81; W 87–86
1997	No. 14	First Round	No. 3 Cincinnati	L 69–86
1998	No. 13	First Round	No. 4 New Mexico	L 62–79
2000	No. 12	First Round	No. 5 Florida	L 68–69 ^{OT}
2001	No. 10	First Round; Second Round	No. 7 Wake Forest; No. 2 Arizona	W 79–63; L 52–73
2003	No. 12	First Round; Second Round; Sweet Sixteen	No. 5 Mississippi State; No. 4 Louisville; No. 1 Oklahoma	W 47–46; W 79–71; L 54–65
2007	No. 5	First Round; Second Round; Sweet Sixteen	No. 12 Old Dominion; No. 4 Maryland; No. 1 Florida	W 57–46; W 62–59; L 57–65
2008	No. 7	First Round; Second Round	No. 10 South Alabama; No. 2 Tennessee	W 81–61; L 71–76 ^{OT}
2009	No. 9	First Round	No. 8 LSU	L 71–75
2010	No. 5	First Round; Second Round; Sweet Sixteen; Elite Eight; Final Four; National Championship Game	No. 12 UTEP; No. 13 Murray State; No. 1 Syracuse; No. 2 Kansas State; No. 5 Michigan State; No. 1 Duke	W 77–59; W 54–52; W 63–59; W 63–56; W 52–50; L 59–61
2011	No. 8	First Round; Second Round; Sweet Sixteen; Elite Eight; Final Four; National Championship Game	No. 9 Old Dominion; No. 1 Pittsburgh; No. 4 Wisconsin; No. 2 Florida; No. 11 VCU; No. 3 Connecticut	W 60–58; W 71–70; W 61–54; W 74–71 ^{OT} W 70–62; L 41–53
2013	No. 6	First Round; Second Round	No. 11 Bucknell; No. 3 Marquette	W 68–56; L 72–74
2015	No. 6	First Round; Second Round	No. 11 Texas; No. 3 Notre Dame	W 56–48; L 64–67 ^{OT}
2016	No. 9	First Round; Second Round	No. 8 Texas Tech; No. 1 Virginia	W 71–61; L 69–77
2017	No. 4	First Round; Second Round; Sweet Sixteen	No. 13 Winthrop; No. 12 Middle Tennessee; No. 1 North Carolina	W 76–64; W 74–65; L 80–92
2018	No. 10	First Round; Second Round	No. 7 Arkansas; No. 2 Purdue	W 79–62; L 73–76

*Following the introduction of the "First Four" round in 2011, the Round of 64 and Round of 32 were referred to as the Second Round and Third Round, respectively, from 2011 to 2015. Then from 2016 moving forward, the Round 64 and Round of 32 will be called the First and Second rounds, as they were prior to 2011.

=== NIT results ===
The Bulldogs have appeared in ten National Invitation Tournaments. Their combined record is 5–10.

Year	Seed	Round	Opponent	Result
1958	N/A	First Round	St. John's	L 69–76
1959	N/A	First Round; Quarterfinals	Fordham; Bradley	W 94–80; L 77–83
1985	N/A	First Round	Indiana	L 57–79
1991	N/A	First Round	Wyoming	L 61–63
1992	N/A	First Round	Purdue	L 56–82
1999	N/A	First Round; Second Round; Quarterfinals	Bradley; Old Dominion; Clemson	W 51–50; W 75–68; L 69–89
2002	N/A	First Round; Second Round	Bowling Green; Syracuse	W 81–69; L 65–66
2006	#8	Opening Round; First Round	Miami (OH); Florida State	W 53–52; L 63–67
2019	#5	First Round	Nebraska	L 76–80
2024	#4	First Round	Minnesota	L 72–73

=== CBI results ===
The Bulldogs have appeared in one College Basketball Invitational. Their record is 2–1.

Year	Round	Opponent	Result
2012	First Round; Quarterfinals; Semifinals	Delaware; Penn; Pittsburgh	W 75–58; W 63–53; L 62–68 ^{OT}

=== CBC results ===
Butler has appeared in the College Basketball Crown once. Their overall record is 1–1.

Year	Round	Opponent	Result
2025	First Round; Quarterfinals	Utah; Boise State	W 86–84; L 93–100

== Professional players ==
=== Bulldogs in the NBA ===
==== All-time NBA/ABA players ====
NBA & ABA players who attended Butler University

Player	NBA Draft	Years	Career Highlights and Awards
Jerry Steiner	1940 No NBA	1945–47	
Bob Evans	1949 Round 4	1949–50	
Ralph O'Brien	1950 Round 6 Pick 68	1950–53	
Billy Shepherd	1972 Undrafted	1972–75	
Gordon Hayward	2010 Round 1 Pick 9	2010–24	NBA All-Star (2017)
Shelvin Mack	2011 Round 2 Pick 34	2011–19	
Kelan Martin	2018 Undrafted	2019–22	
Sean McDermott	2020 Undrafted	2020–21	

=== Bulldogs in the NBA G-League ===
Draft Year	Player	Pos.	Team	NBA Affiliate
2026	Michael Ajayi	PF	Greensboro Swarm	Hornets
2025	Jahmyl Telfort	SF	San Diego Clippers	Clippers
2020	Sean McDermott	SF	Valley Suns	Suns

=== Bulldogs in international leagues ===
==== Current players overseas ====
Draft Year	Player	Pos.	Team	Country
2025	Patrick McCaffery	PF	CS Vâlcea 1924	(Romania)
2025	Pierre Brooks II	SF	Tecnoswitch Ruvo Di Puglia	(Italy)
2025	Andre Screen	C	Kapfenberg Bulls	(Australia)
2022	Bryce Nze	PF	Dinamo Sassari	(Italy)
2022	Bo Hodges	SF	Uni Baskets Münster	(Germany)
2022	Christian David	SF	Blackwater Bossing	(Philippines)
2020	Kamar Baldwin	PG	Bayern Munich	(Germany)
2020	Jordan Tucker	SF	Promitheas Patras	(Greece)
2019	Paul Jorgensen	PG	Básquet Coruña	(Spain)
2018	Kelan Martin	SF	UCAM Murcia CB	(Spain)
2018	Tyler Wideman	PF	Nuova Pallacanestro Vigevano 1955	(Italy)

==== All-time players overseas ====
The following former Butler Bulldogs have played professionally in leagues outside of the United States.

- Jermaine Guice
- Thomas Jackson
- Ryan Hainje
- Brandon Polk
- A.J. Graves
- Mike Green
- Matt Howard
- Shelvin Mack
- Rotnei Clarke

== Coaching history ==
Coach	Years	Win–loss	Win %	Conference titles	NCAA Tourn. appearances
Harlan Page	1920–1926	98–36	.731	0	
Tony Hinkle	1926–1942; 1945–1970	560–392	.588	6	1
Frank Hedden	1942–1945	18–15	.545	0	
George Theofanis	1970–1977	79–105	.429	2	
Joe Sexson	1977–1989	143–188	.432	1	
Barry Collier	1989–2000	196–132	.598	2	3
Thad Matta	2000–2001; 2022–2026	87–77	.530	1	1
Todd Lickliter	2001–2007	131–61	.682	3	2
Brad Stevens	2007–2013	166–49	.772	4	5
Brandon Miller	2013–2014	14–17	.452	0	
Chris Holtmann	2014–2017	70–31	.693	0	3
LaVall Jordan	2017–2022	83–74	.529	0	1
Ronald Nored	2026–present	0–0	.000	0	0

== Awards and honors ==
=== Hall of Fame inductees ===
Naismith Memorial Basketball Hall of Fame

- Harlan Page (Coach) – 1962
- Tony Hinkle (Coach) – 1965

National Collegiate Basketball Hall of Fame

- Tony Hinkle (Coach) – 2006
- Harlan Page (Coach) – 2006

=== Individual coaching honors ===
National Coach of the Year
2007	Todd Lickliter	NABC

Conference Coach of the Year

1956	Tony Hinkle	Indiana Collegiate
1961	Tony Hinkle	Indiana Collegiate
1962	Tony Hinkle	Indiana Collegiate
1973	George Theofanis	Indiana Collegiate
1977	George Theofanis	Indiana Collegiate
1978	Joe Sexson	Indiana Collegiate

1984	Joe Sexson	Horizon League
1991	Barry Collier	Horizon League
1997	Barry Collier	Horizon League
1999	Barry Collier	Horizon League
2000	Barry Collier	Horizon League
2001	Thad Matta	Horizon League

2005	Todd Lickliter	Horizon League
2007	Todd Lickliter	Horizon League
2009	Brad Stevens	Horizon League
2010	Brad Stevens	Horizon League
2017	Chris Holtmann	Big East

=== Individual Player honors ===
National Player of the Year
2003	Brandon Miller	Guard	Chip Hilton Award
2008	Mike Green	Guard	Chip Hilton Award, Frances Pomeroy Naismith Award
2010	Matt Howard	Forward	Elite 88 Award
2011	Matt Howard	Forward	Academic All-American of the Year, Elite 88 Award
2015	Alex Barlow	Guard	Senior CLASS Award

Conference Player of the Year
1949	Ralph "Buckshot" O'Brien	Mid-American Conference
1962	Tom Bowman	Indiana Collegiate Conference
1977	Wayne Burris	Indiana Collegiate Conference
1978	Tom Orner	Indiana Collegiate Conference
1991	Darin Archbold	Horizon League
1997	Jon Neuhouser	Horizon League
2002	Rylan Hainje	Horizon League
2006	Brandon Polk	Horizon League
2008	Mike Green	Horizon League
2009	Matt Howard	Horizon League
2010	Gordon Hayward	Horizon League

Conference Individual Awards
2014	Alex Barlow	Guard	Big East Scholar-Athlete of the Year
2015	Alex Barlow	Guard	Big East Scholar-Athlete of the Year, Big East Sportsmanship Award
2016	Kellen Dunham	Guard	Big East Scholar-Athlete of the Year, Big East Sportsmanship Award
2018	Tyler Wideman	Forward	Big East Sportsmanship Award
2019	Nate Fowler	Center	Big East Sportsmanship Award
2019	Paul Jorgensen	Guard	Big East Sixth Man of the Year
2020	Kamar Baldwin	Guard	Big East Scholar-Athlete of the Year, Big East Sportsmanship Award

All-Conference team selections

Year	Name	Pos.	Conf.
1980	Tony Warren†	G	MCC
1981	Lynn Mitchem†	F	MCC
1982	Lynn Mitchem†	F	MCC
1983	Lynn Mitchem†	F	MCC
1983	Tim McRoberts‡	F	MCC
1984	Tim McRoberts†	F	MCC
1985	Chad Tucker†	C	MCC
1986	Chad Tucker†	C	MCC
1987	Darrin Fitzgerald†	G	MCC
1987	Darren Fowlkes‡	F	MCC
1988	Chad Tucker†	C	MCC
1988	Darren Fowlkes‡	F	MCC
1989	Darren Fowlkes†	F	MCC
1991	Darin Archbold†	F	MCC
1992	Darin Archbold†	F	MCC
1993	Jermaine Guice‡	G	MCC
1994	Jermaine Guice†	G	MCC
1994	John Taylor‡	F	MCC
1996	Jon Neuhouser†	F	MCC
1997	Jon Neuhouser†	F	MCC

Year	Name	Pos.	Conf.
1997	Kelsey Wilson‡	G	MCC
1999	Mike Marshall†	F	MCC
2000	Mike Marshall‡	F	MCC
2000	LaVall Jordan‡	G	MCC
2001	Thomas Jackson†	G	MCC
2001	LaVall Jordan‡	G	MCC
2002	Thomas Jackson†	G	Horizon League
2002	Ryan Hainje†	G	Horizon League
2003	Joel Cornette‡	F	Horizon League
2003	Brandon Miller‡	G	Horizon League
2004	Mike Monserez‡	B	Horizon League
2005	Brandon Polk‡	F	Horizon League
2006	Brandon Polk†	F	Horizon League
2007	A.J. Graves†	G	Horizon League
2007	Mike Green‡	G	Horizon League
2008	A.J. Graves†	G	Horizon League
2008	Mike Green†	G	Horizon League
2008	Matt Howard‡	F	Horizon League
2009	Matt Howard†	F	Horizon League
2009	Gordon Hayward†	F	Horizon League

Year	Name	Pos.	Conf.
2010	Matt Howard†	F	Horizon League
2010	Gordon Hayward†	F	Horizon League
2010	Shelvin Mack†	G	Horizon League
2011	Matt Howard†	F	Horizon League
2011	Shelvin Mack‡	G	Horizon League
2012	Ronald Nored‡	G	Horizon League
2013	Rotnei Clarke†	G	Atlantic-10
2014	Kellen Dunham‡	G	Big East
2015	Kellen Dunham†	G	Big East
2015	Roosevelt Jones‡	F	Big East
2016	Roosevelt Jones‡	F	Big East
2016	Kelan Martin‡	F	Big East
2017	Andrew Chrabascz†	F	Big East
2017	Kelan Martin‡	F	Big East
2018	Kelan Martin†	F	Big East
2019	Kamar Baldwin‡	G	Big East
2020	Kamar Baldwin†	G	Big East

† – denotes First-Team All-Conference
‡ – denotes Second-Team All-Conference

All-Americans

- H. W. Middlesworth – 1924
- Frank Baird – 1934
- Jerry Steiner – 1940
- Bob Dietz – 1941
- Ralph "Buckshot" O'Brien – 1950
- Jimmy Doyle – 1950
- Ted Guzek – 1957
- Billy Shepherd – 1971
- Chad Tucker* – 1985
- A. J. Graves* – 2007
- Mike Green* – 2008
- Matt Howard* – 2009
- Gordon Hayward* – 2010
- Kelan Martin* – 2018

(*) Denotes Honorable Mention

Academic All-Americans

- Chris Miskel – 1995***
- A. J. Graves – 2007*, 2008**
- Drew Streicher – 2008***
- Matt Howard – 2009**, 2010*, 2011*
- Gordon Hayward – 2010***
- Ronald Nored – 2012**
- Andrew Smith – 2013**
- Alex Barlow – 2015**

(*) Denotes 1st team
(**) Denotes 2nd team
(***) Denotes 3rd team

McDonald's All-American

- Tyler Lewis – 2012

Information on the awards comes from the 2009–2010 media guide.

== Record ==
- See List of Butler Bulldogs men's basketball seasons

=== Record vs. Big East opponents ===
- Connecticut: 0–9
- Creighton: 12–16
- DePaul: 20–7
- Georgetown: 13–11
- Marquette: 24–24
- Providence: 6–19
- Seton Hall: 10–13
- St. John's: 11–12
- Villanova: 7–16
- Xavier: 25–46

== All-time leading scorers ==
Rank	Name	Years	Points
1	Chad Tucker	1983–1988	2,321
2	Kelan Martin	2014–2018	2,047
3	Darrin Fitzgerald	1983–1987	2,019
4	Kamar Baldwin	2016–2020	1,956
5	Kellen Dunham	2012–2016	1,946
6	Matt Howard	2007–2011	1,939
7	A. J. Graves	2004–2008	1,807
8	Lynn Mitchem	1979–1983	1,798
9	Darin Archbold	1988–1992	1,744
10	Billy Shepherd	1969–1972	1,733
11	Jermaine Guice	1990–1994	1,607
12	Darren Fowlkes	1985–1989	1,543
13	Roosevelt Jones	2011–2013, 2014–2016	1,533
14	Wayne Burris	1973–1977	1,531
15	Shelvin Mack	2008–2011	1,527
16	Jon Neuhouser	1994–1998	1,485
17	Bobby Plump	1954–1958	1,439
18	Keith Greve	1951–1954, 1957–1958	1,400
19	Jeff Blue	1961–1964	1,392
20	Rylan Hainje	1998–2002	1,388
21	Khyle Marshall	2010–2014	1,373

Sources of information

== Tournament titles ==
Season	Tournament	Results
1923–24	AAU National Tournament	W vs. Schooley-Woodstock 34–29; W vs. Hillyards 35–29; W vs. Kansas St. Teachers 40–21; W vs. K. C. Athletic Club 30–26
1947–48	Hoosier Classic	W vs. Purdue 52–50; W vs. Indiana 64–51
1948–49	Hoosier Classic	W vs. Indiana 64–55; W vs. Purdue 47–43
1960–61	Hoosier Classic	W vs. Illinois 70–68; W vs. Purdue 65–63
1996–97	MCC Tournament	W vs. Milwaukee 48–36; W vs. Green Bay 57–52^{OT} W vs. UIC 69–68
1997–98	MCC Tournament	W vs. Loyola 62–53; W vs. Wright State 67–48; W vs. Green Bay 70–51
1999–00	MCC Tournament	W vs. Loyola 61–57; W vs. Milwaukee 65–51; W vs. Detroit 62–43
2000–01	MCC Tournament	W vs. Loyola 78–52; W vs. Wright State 66–58; W vs. Detroit 53–38
2001–02	Top of the World Classic	W vs. Radford 73–56; W vs. Delaware 76–59; W vs. Washington 67–64
2001–02	Hoosier Classic	W vs. Samford 45–37; W vs. Indiana 66–64
2006–07	NIT Tip-Off	W vs. Notre Dame 71–69; W vs. Indiana 60–55; W vs. Tennessee 56–44; W vs. Gonzaga 79–71
2007–08	Great Alaska Shootout	W vs. Michigan 79–65; W vs. Virginia Tech 84–78; W vs. Texas Tech 81–71
2007–08	Horizon League Tournament	W vs. Illinois-Chicago 66–50; W vs. Cleveland State 70–55
2009–10	Horizon League Tournament	W vs. Milwaukee 68–59; W vs. Wright State 70–45
2010–11	Diamond Head Classic	W vs. Utah 74–62; W vs. Florida State 67–64; W vs. Washington State 84–68
2010–11	Horizon League Tournament	W vs. Cleveland State 76–68; W vs. Milwaukee 59–44
2016–17	Continental Tire Las Vegas Invitational	W vs. Vanderbilt 76–66; W vs. Arizona 69–65
2019–20	CBE Hall of Fame Classic	W vs. Missouri 63–52; W vs. Stanford 68–67
2024–25	Arizona Tip-Off	W vs. Northwestern 71–69; W vs. Mississippi State 87–77
2025–26	Greenbrier Tip-Off	W vs. South Carolina 79–72; W vs. Virginia 80–73
