= LaVall Jordan =

American basketball coach (born 1979)

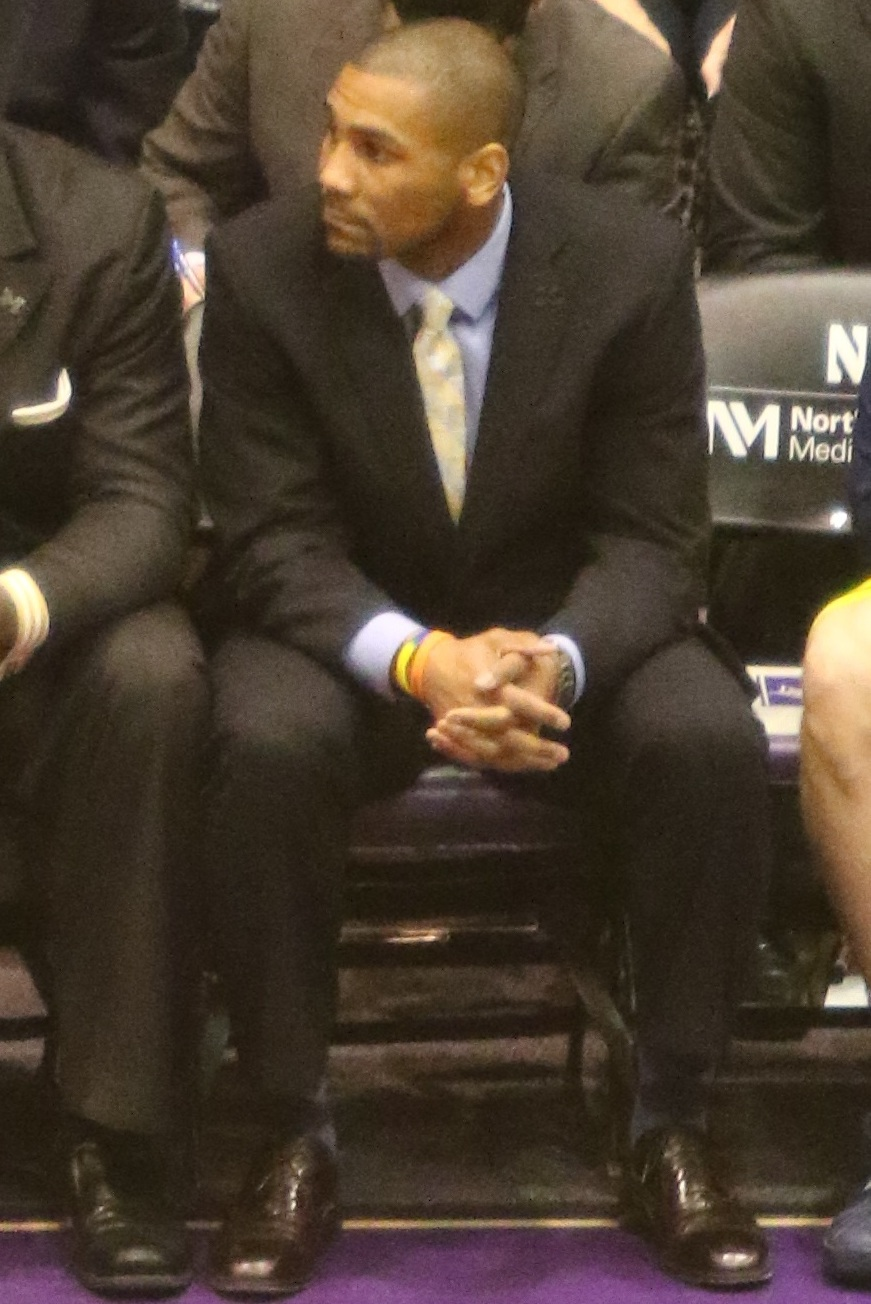
- Jordan in 2015

Current position
- Title: Assistant coach
- Team: DePaul
- Conference: Big East

Biographical details
- Born: April 16, 1979 (age 47); Albion, Michigan, U.S.

Playing career
- 1997–2001: Butler
- 2002–2003: Huntsville Flight
- Position: Guard

Coaching career (HC unless noted)
- 2003–2007: Butler (assistant)
- 2007–2010: Iowa (assistant)
- 2010–2016: Michigan (assistant)
- 2016–2017: Milwaukee
- 2017–2022: Butler
- 2024–present: DePaul (assistant)

Head coaching record
- Overall: 94–98 (.490)
- Tournaments: 1–1 (NCAA Division I); 0–1 (NIT)

LaVall Jurrant Jordan (born April 16, 1979) is an American college basketball coach who is currently an assistant coach at DePaul University. He previously served as the head coach at Butler University and Milwaukee, as well as assistant coach at Michigan, Iowa, and Butler. In six seasons as an assistant coach under Michigan head coach John Beilein, Michigan advanced to the NCAA tournament each year except 2015, won Big Ten Conference regular season championships in 2012 and 2014 and appeared in the Elite 8 in 2014 and the National Championship in 2013.

== Playing career ==
Jordan played for Butler from 1998 to 2001. He helped lead the team to three Midwestern Collegiate Conference (now Horizon League) tournament titles and two regular-season championships while also playing in four consecutive postseason tournaments — three NCAA (1998, 2000, and 2001) and one NIT (1999). Butler also won its first NCAA Tournament game in 39 years with a 79–63 win over Wake Forest in 2001. He was a two-time All-Conference player and the 2001 Midwestern Collegiate Conference men's basketball tournament MVP.

Jordan played professional basketball in Europe for one year after graduating. He was the first Butler player to participate in the NBA Development League, playing for the Huntsville Flight.

== Coaching career ==
=== Assistant at Butler and Iowa ===
Jordan spent four years (2003–07) on Todd Lickliter's staff at Butler before following him to Iowa for three additional seasons (2007–2010).

=== Assistant at Michigan ===
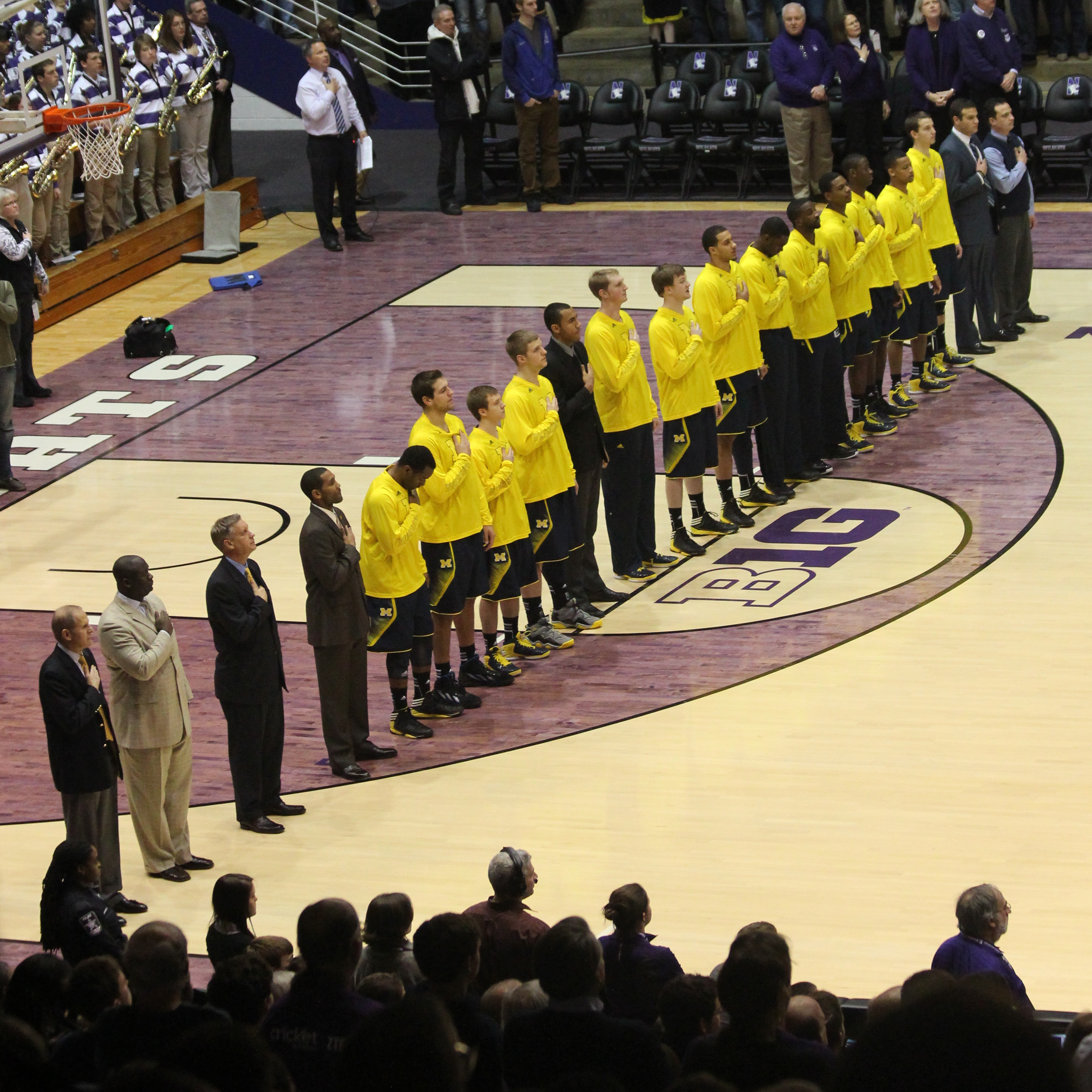
Jordan (fourth from left) with the national runner-up 2012–13 Michigan Wolverines

Under coach John Beilein at Michigan, Jordan's focus was on recruiting and developing back court players along with defensive strategies, scouting, and on-court coaching. Jordan is often given credit in greatly aiding in the development of Michigan's guards, especially point guards. During the time he spent there, Trey Burke, Tim Hardaway Jr. and Darius Morris all played under Jordan. As a member of the coaching staff, Jordan helped Michigan to five NCAA Tournament appearances, including two trips to the Elite Eight and one to the National Championship Game in 2013.

=== Head coach at UW-Milwaukee ===
On April 7, 2016, Milwaukee hired Jordan to replace Rob Jeter. In his first year as a head coach with the 2016–17 Milwaukee Panthers, the team finished with an 11–24 record, but it made an improbable run in the 2017 Horizon League men's basketball tournament, becoming the first 10th-seeded team to win a Horizon League tournament game, and going on to reach the championship game against Northern Kentucky. Had they won, they would have set a record for the team with the most losses reaching the NCAA Division I men's basketball tournament.

=== Head coach at Butler ===
On June 12, 2017, Butler hired Jordan to replace Chris Holtmann. Butler's athletic director Barry Collier had recruited Jordan as a player and coached him for three seasons. In his first season as head coach, he led the unranked Bulldogs to a stunning 101–93 upset of No. 1 Villanova in Hinkle Fieldhouse, marking Butler's third straight win over the Wildcats.

On April 1, 2022, Butler announced that they had parted ways with Jordan. He led the Bulldogs to an 83-74 record during his five seasons.

=== Assistant at DePaul ===
In April 2024, Jordan was hired as an assistant coach at DePaul.

== Personal life ==
Jordan is married to Destinee Jordan and they have three daughters together. Jordan is a Christian.

== Head coaching record ==
Record table
Season	Team	Overall	Conference	Standing	Postseason
Milwaukee Panthers (Horizon League) (2016–2017)
2016–17	Milwaukee	11–24	4–14	10th	
Milwaukee:		11–24 (.314)	4–14 (.222)		
Butler Bulldogs (Big East Conference) (2017–2022)
2017–18	Butler	21–14	9–9	T–6th	NCAA Division I Round of 32
2018–19	Butler	16–17	7–11	T–8th	NIT First Round
2019–20	Butler	22–9	10–8	5th	
2020–21	Butler	10–15	8–12	10th	
2021–22	Butler	14–19	6–14	T–9th	
Butler:		83–74 (.529)	40–54 (.426)		
Total:		94–98 (.490)			
