= 2009–10 Mid-American Conference men's basketball season =

- League: NCAA Division I
- Sport: Basketball
- Duration: November 13, 2009 through March 13, 2010
- Number of teams: 12
- TV partner(s): Big Ten Network, Comcast SportsNet Chicago, ESPN, Fox Sports Ohio, Fox Sports Detroit, Fox Sports Midwest, Time Warner SportsNet–Buffalo

Regular season
- Champion: Kent State
- Runners-up: Akron
- Season MVP: David Kool

Tournament
- Champions: Ohio
- Runners-up: Akron
- Finals MVP: Armon Bassett

Basketball seasons
- ← 2008–09 2010–11 →

2009–10 Mid-American Conference men's basketball standings
| | Conf. | | | | Overall |
| Team | W | | L | PCT | W | | L | PCT |
|---|---|---|---|---|---|---|---|---|
East
| Kent State | 13 | – | 3 | .813 | 24 | – | 10 | .706 |
| Akron | 12 | – | 4 | .750 | 24 | – | 11 | .686 |
| Miami | 9 | – | 7 | .563 | 14 | – | 18 | .438 |
| Buffalo | 9 | – | 7 | .563 | 18 | – | 12 | .600 |
| Ohio† | 7 | – | 9 | .438 | 22 | – | 15 | .595 |
| Bowling Green | 6 | – | 10 | .375 | 14 | – | 16 | .467 |
West
| Central Michigan | 9 | – | 7 | .563 | 15 | – | 15 | .500 |
| Eastern Michigan | 8 | – | 8 | .500 | 17 | – | 15 | .531 |
| Western Michigan | 8 | – | 8 | .500 | 18 | – | 15 | .545 |
| Ball State | 8 | – | 8 | .500 | 15 | – | 15 | .500 |
| Northern Illinois | 6 | – | 10 | .375 | 10 | – | 20 | .333 |
| Toledo | 1 | – | 15 | .063 | 4 | – | 28 | .125 |
† Conference tournament winner Rankings from AP Poll

The 2009–10 Mid-American Conference men's basketball season was the 64th college basketball season in the conference's existence. The conference features 12 teams in two divisions, East and West, who compete for the Mid-American Conference (MAC) regular season and tournament titles. Kent State won the MAC regular season title with a record of 13–3. Ninth-seeded Ohio won the MAC tournament received the MAC's automatic bid into the NCAA Men's Division I Basketball Championship tournament. There they defeated Georgetown 97–83 before losing to Tennessee in the second round. Armon Bassett of Ohio was named the tournament MVP.

== Pre-season ==
=== Coaching ===
None of the twelve teams made head coaching changes from last season, although some gave their coaches contract extensions. Ball State gave head coach Billy Taylor a two-year contract extension after the Cardinals shared the MAC West Division title with Central Michigan. Taylor finished second in the Coach of the Year ballot sponsored by the Conference and has held a 20–41 record since taking over the program. The contract extension will keep him at Ball State through March 31, 2014. Other changes with the Ball State program include Bob Simmons being promoted to associate head coach and Mitch Gilfillan hired as the Director of Basketball Operations.

On the east side, Bowling Green gave their head coach Louis Orr a two-year extension that would also keep him through the 2013–14 basketball season. He beat out Taylor for the MAC Coach of the Year ballot last season. In Orr's two seasons at Bowling Green he increased the team's conference winning percentage, going from 3–13 in the year prior to his arrival, to 7–9 and 11–5 in his two seasons at the institution. To complement the contract extension, Bowling Green announced that Dennis Hopson would join the Falcons as an assistant coach.

The Akron Zips gave their head coach Keith Dambrot a lengthy contract extension, keeping him through the 2015–16 season. Dambrot had led the Zips to four consecutive 20-win seasons in his five years at Akron (his first season had 19 wins). Those five years were capped off with an NCAA Men's Division I Basketball Championship Tournament appearance in the 2008–09 season. However, the university lost a key assistant coach when it was announced that Jeff Boals would leave to become an assistant at Ohio State. Boals was a key figure in recruiting Zeke Marshall, a 7-foot center who has been Akron's highest recruit in recent history. To replace Boals, Akron hired Dan Peters, former Ohio State assistant coach who helped lead the team to the 2007 National Championship Game. Peters role with the Zips will be the Director of Basketball Operations.

=== Media voting ===
On October 28, the members of the MAC News Media Panel voted in the Preseason Media Poll. They voted Akron as the favorite in the MAC East Division and Central Michigan in the MAC West Division. The Zips come off of a 2008 where they represented the Conference in the 2009 NCAA Men's Division I Basketball Tournament, and Central Michigan won a share of the MAC West Division title last season.

East Division
| Place | Team | 1st | Points |
|---|---|---|---|
| 1 | Akron Zips | 19 | 190 points |
| 2 | Kent State Golden Flashes | 3 | 108 points |
| 3 | Buffalo Bulls | 1 | 97 points |
| 4 | Miami RedHawks | – | 78 points |
| 5 | Bowling Green Falcons | 1 | 54 points |
| 6 | Ohio Bobcats | – | 32 points |

West Division
| Place | Team | 1st | Points |
|---|---|---|---|
| 1 | Central Michigan Chippewas | 10 | 113 points |
| 2 | Northern Illinois Huskies | 4 | 102 points |
| 3 | Eastern Michigan Eagles | 3 | 94 points |
| 4 | Ball State Cardinals | 3 | 87 points |
| 5 | Western Michigan Broncos | 4 | 79 points |
| 6 | Toledo Rockets | – | 29 points |

The media also took a vote on who they think would win the MAC tournament at the end of the season. Unlike the preseason votes, the media would only select the winner of the tournament, and not the placement of the teams afterwards. Akron received the most votes with 19, followed by Buffalo with two votes. Northern Illinois, Kent State, and Bowling Green each received one vote to win the tournament.

=== Exhibition games ===
All 12 MAC teams combined to play a total of 16 exhibition games. All of these games were against schools of lower divisions (NCAA Division II, for example). 15 of these 16 games were played in the home court of the MAC team, with the exclusion of a Kent State Golden Flashes game at the College of Wooster on November 7. Overall, MAC teams went 15–1 in these exhibition games, with the lone loss coming from the Toledo Rockets when they lost 48–56 against Central State University. The largest margin of victory was 50 points, which was achieved in two games. Northern Illinois was able to beat Marygrove College with a score of 120–70, and the Akron Zips were able to match that margin of victory with an 88–38 victory over Mount Union College.

== Regular season ==
=== November ===
Five Mid-American Conference teams opened up their season on November 13, the first Friday after the 2009–10 NCAA Division I men's basketball season began. Miami first played the Tigers of Towson University in their home court in Maryland. While the RedHawks were able to build to a 42–37 lead at halftime, Towson would go on a 10–2 run in the second half and eventually sealing the victory with a final score of 82–71. Northern Illinois would also begin their season with a loss, losing 55–77 against intrastate opponent Northwestern Ohio began their season with a win Ohio Valley University by a score of 101–72 in the Convocation Center. Five Ohio players reached double-digits in scoring, led by Ivo Baltic who had 20 points in that game. Ball State was also able to begin the season with a victory, theirs over Horizon League opponent Valparaiso. Six players from Ball State were able to score over ten points, which is the first time in over ten years that it has been accomplished by a team. The Cardinals won by a score of 88–78. Finally, Kent State began their season by hosting a version of the 2009 Hispanic College Fund Classic. Their first match-up in that tournament was against the Samford Bulldogs. The Golden Flashes snuck out a win in that game, 69–66, to keep their home opener streak at 13 games.

=== BracketBusters ===
For the eighth year, ESPN organized an event that's known as the BracketBusters, which features teams from Mid-Major Conferences which face each other in order to improve their strength of schedule. The matchups will be announced on February 1 with the teams facing each other on February 19 or 20, 2010. The MAC is tied with the most teams in the event, with them and the Colonial Athletic Association having 12 teams each featured in the field.

Ball State, Bowling Green, Central Michigan, Kent State, Miami, and Ohio will all host games in their venues, while Akron, Buffalo, Eastern Michigan, Northern Illinois, Toledo, and Western Michigan travelling to opponents' arenas.

== Awards ==
=== All-MAC Preseason Team ===
As a part of the Preseason Media Poll, the members also voted on the Preseason All-MAC East and West Division teams. Akron and Eastern Michigan had two players in the East and West Division polls, respectively.

East Division All-MAC Preseason Team
| Player | School |
|---|---|
| Kenny Hayes | Miami |
| Brett McKnight | Akron |
| Rodney Pierce | Buffalo |
| Chris Singletary | Kent State |
| Anthony "Humpty" Hitchens | Akron |

West Division All-MAC Preseason Team
| Player | School |
|---|---|
| David Kool | Western Michigan |
| Jarrod Jones | Ball State |
| Brandon Bowdry | Eastern Michigan |
| Darion "Jake" Anderson | Northern Illinois |
| Carlos Medlock | Eastern Michigan |

=== Player of the Week ===
East Division Player of the Week
| Week | Player | School |
|---|---|---|
| 1 | Rodriquez Sherman | Kent State |
| 2 | Anthony "Humpty" Hitchens | Akron |
| 3 | Julian Mavunga | Miami |
| 4 | Dee Brown | Bowling Green |
| 5 | Armon Bassett | Ohio |
| 6 | D. J. Cooper | Ohio |
| 7 | Jimmy Conyers | Akron |
| 8 | Justin Greene | Kent State |
| 9 | Chris Singletary | Kent State |
| 10 | Rodney Pierce | Buffalo |
| 11 | Justin Greene (2) | Kent State |
| 12 | Chris Singletary (2) | Kent State |
| 13 | Kenny Hayes; Chris Singletary (3) | Miami; Kent State |

West Division Player of the Week
| Week | Player | School |
|---|---|---|
| 1 | Brandon Bowdry | Eastern Michigan |
| 2 | Martelle McLemore | Western Michigan |
| 3 | Carlos Medlock | Eastern Michigan |
| 4 | Brandon Bowdry (2) | Eastern Michigan |
| 5 | David Kool | Western Michigan |
| 6 | David Kool (2) | Western Michigan |
| 7 | Jarrod Jones; Alex Wolf | Ball State; Western Michigan |
| 8 | Xavier Silas | Northern Illinois |
| 9 | Xavier Silas (2) | Northern Illinois |
| 10 | Darion "Jake" Anderson | Northern Illinois |
| 11 | Jordan Bitzer | Central Michigan |
| 12 | Jarrod Jones (2); David Kool (3) | Ball State; Western Michigan |
| 13 | David Kool (4); Carlos Medlock (2) | Western Michigan; Eastern Michigan |

=== All-MAC Teams ===
All-MAC First Team
| Player | School |
|---|---|
| Jimmy Conyers | Akron |
| Rodney Pierce | Buffalo |
| Kenny Hayes | Miami |
| David Kool | Western Michigan |
| Chris Singletary | Kent State |

All-MAC Second Team
| Player | School |
|---|---|
| Jordan Bitzer | Central Michigan |
| Robbie Harman | Central Michigan |
| Carlos Medlock | Eastern Michigan |
| Brandon Bowdry | Eastern Michigan |
| Justin Greene | Kent State |

All-MAC Freshman Team
| Player | School |
|---|---|
| Zeke Marshall | Akron |
| Jauwan Scaife | Ball State |
| D. J. Cooper | Ohio |
| Jake Barnett | Toledo |
| Nate Hutcheson | Western Michigan |

Source: Men's Basketball All-MAC Teams, All-Freshman Team Announced

== See also ==
- Basketball in the United States
- 2009–10 Mid-American Conference women's basketball season
