= 2009–10 Toledo Rockets men's basketball team =

American college basketball season

2009–10 Toledo Rockets men's basketball
- Conference: Mid-American Conference
- West Division
- Record: 4–28 (1–15 MAC)
- Head coach: Gene Cross
- Assistant coaches: Brian Loyd; Bob Sundvold; Nate Tuori
- Home arena: Savage Arena

2009–10 Mid-American Conference men's basketball standings
	Conf.				Overall
Team	W		L	PCT	W		L	PCT
East
Kent State	13	–	3	.813	24	–	10	.706
Akron	12	–	4	.750	24	–	11	.686
Miami	9	–	7	.563	14	–	18	.438
Buffalo	9	–	7	.563	18	–	12	.600
Ohio†	7	–	9	.438	22	–	15	.595
Bowling Green	6	–	10	.375	14	–	16	.467
West
Central Michigan	9	–	7	.563	15	–	15	.500
Eastern Michigan	8	–	8	.500	17	–	15	.531
Western Michigan	8	–	8	.500	18	–	15	.545
Ball State	8	–	8	.500	15	–	15	.500
Northern Illinois	6	–	10	.375	10	–	20	.333
Toledo	1	–	15	.063	4	–	28	.125
† Conference tournament winner Rankings from AP Poll

The 2009–10 Toledo Rockets men's basketball team represented the University of Toledo in the college basketball season of 2009–10. The team, coached by Gene Cross, were members of the Mid-American Conference and played their homes game in Savage Arena. They finished the season 4–28, 1–15 in MAC play and lost in the first round of the 2010 MAC men's basketball tournament. Cross resigned at the end of the season.

== Before the season ==
=== Roster changes ===
The Rockets only returned two starters from last year's team, Justin Anyijong and Larry Bastfield. The other three starters from last season, Tyrone Kent, Jonathan Amos, and Anthony Byrd, were high contributors from that year. Kent and Amos both had over 13 points per game, and combined for 9.9 rebounds per game, while Byrd had 5.2 points and 2.1 rebounds per game. Kent found professional play with French team L'Hermine de Nantes. The team also lost senior Ridley Johnson to graduation.

To replace these seniors, the University of Toledo recruited eight new players, all freshmen, for the 2009–10 season.

=== Recruiting ===
College recruiting
Name	Hometown	School	Height	Weight	Commit date
Jake Barnett; PG	Wauwatosa, WI	East/Notre Dame (MA)	6 ft 5 in (1.96 m)	190 lb (86 kg)	Mar 18, 2009
Jake Barnett; PG	Recruit ratings: Scout: (80)				
Jordan Dressler; PF	Columbia, MO	Rock Bridge SHS	6 ft 8 in (2.03 m)	245 lb (111 kg)	Oct 13, 2008
Jordan Dressler; PF	Recruit ratings: Scout: (85)				
Josh Freelove; PG	North Lauderdale, FL	North Broward Prep	6 ft 1 in (1.85 m)	175 lb (79 kg)	Apr 22, 2009
Josh Freelove; PG	Recruit ratings: Scout: (78)				
Malcolm Griffin; SG	Chicago, IL	Hyde Park HS	6 ft 4 in (1.93 m)	205 lb (93 kg)	Apr 15, 2009
Malcolm Griffin; SG	Recruit ratings: Scout: (82)				
Hayden Humes; SF	Valparaiso, IN	Valparaiso HS	6 ft 8 in (2.03 m)	210 lb (95 kg)	Oct 28, 2008
Hayden Humes; SF	Recruit ratings: Scout: (86)				
Kevin Rohner	Rochester Hills, MI	Rochester Adams HS	6 ft 9 in (2.06 m)	210 lb (95 kg)	
Kevin Rohner	Recruit ratings: No ratings found				
Devin Russell; PF	Toledo, OH	Start HS	6 ft 9 in (2.06 m)	210 lb (95 kg)	Jul 3, 2008
Devin Russell; PF	Recruit ratings: Scout: (78)				
Neil Watson; PG	Kansas City, KS	Sumner Academy	5 ft 10 in (1.78 m)	165 lb (75 kg)	Jan 16, 2009
Neil Watson; PG	Recruit ratings: Scout: (85)				
Overall recruit ranking:
Note: In many cases, Scout, Rivals, 247Sports, On3, and ESPN may conflict in their listings of height and weight.; In these cases, the average was taken. ESPN grades are on a 100-point scale.; Sources: "Toledo Commit List for 2009". Rivals.; "Scout.com: Basketball Recruiting". Scout.; "Toledo Basketball Recruiting 2009". ESPN.; "Scout.com Team Recruiting Rankings". Scout.; "2009 Team Ranking". Rivals.

== Roster ==
Roster current as of August 27, when their summer prospectus was published.

Name	Number	Position	Height	Weight	Year	Hometown
Stephen Albrecht	15	G	6–3	175	Freshman	Crown Point, Indiana
Justin Anyijong	1	F/C	6–9	205	Junior	East Grand Rapids, Michigan
Jake Barnett	30	G	6–5	190	Freshman	Wauwatosa, Wisconsin
Larry Bastfield	11	G	5–11	190	Sophomore	Baltimore, Maryland
Jordan Dressler	42	F/C	6–8	245	Freshman	Columbia, Missouri
Josh Freelove	10	G	6–1	175	Freshman	North Lauderdale, Florida
Malcolm Griffin	23	G	6–4	205	Freshman	Chicago, Illinois
Hayden Humes	4	F	6–8	210	Freshman	Valparaiso, Indiana
Mouhamed Lo	33	F	6–8	225	Junior	New York, New York
Drew Rodriguez	20	G	6–0	175	Sophomore	Dearborn, Michigan
Kevin Rohner	21	G	6–1	165	Freshman	Rochester Hills, Michigan
Devin Russell	35	F/C	6–9	210	Freshman	Toledo, Ohio
Ian Salter	45	F/C	6–10	215	Sophomore	Fairfax, California
Jay Shunnar	22	G	6–1	170	Sophomore	Ann Arbor, Michigan
Neil Watson	31	G	5–10	165	Freshman	Kansas City, Kansas

== Coaching staff ==
Name	Position	College	Graduating year
Gene Cross	Head coach	University of Illinois at Urbana-Champaign	1994
Brian Loyd	Assistant coach	University of Tulsa	1991
Bob Sundvold	Assistant coach	South Dakota State University	1977
Nate Tuori	Assistant coach	Rochester College	1999
Brad Konerman	Director of basketball operations	Xavier University	2007
Brian Jones	Head athletic trainer	Ball State University	1995
Steve Murray	Strength and conditioning coach	Penn State University	1987

== Schedule ==
Date time, TV	Rank^{#}	Opponent^{#}	Result	Record	Site (attendance) city, state
Exhibition
November 10*; 7:00 p.m.		Central State	L 49–56; Stats		Savage Arena; Toledo, Ohio
Regular season
November 14*; 7:00 p.m.		Eastern Illinois	L 62–72; Stats	0–1	Savage Arena (4,127); Toledo, Ohio
November 18*; 7:30 p.m.		at Cincinnati	L 68–92; Stats	0–2	Fifth Third Arena (7,010); Cincinnati, Ohio
November 20*; 6:30 p.m.		at No. 2 Michigan State	L 62–75; Stats	0–3	Breslin Student Events Center (14,759); East Lansing, Michigan
November 27*; 2:00 p.m.		vs. Cornell; Legends Classic	L 60–78; Stats	0–4	Daskalakis Athletic Center; Philadelphia, Pennsylvania
November 28*; 4:30 p.m.		at Drexel; Legends Classic	L 59–69	0–5	Daskalakis Athletic Center (1,206); Philadelphia, Pennsylvania
November 29*; 12:00 p.m.		vs. Vermont; Legends Classic	L 49–82; Stats	0–6	Daskalakis Athletic Center; Philadelphia, Pennsylvania
December 2*; 7:00 p.m.		Rochester	W 65–46; Stats	1–6	Savage Arena (3,592); Toledo, Ohio
December 5*; 2:00 p.m.		UMBC	W 76–67; Stats	2–6	Savage Arena (3,657); Toledo, Ohio
December 8*; 7:00 p.m.		Wright State	L 56–66; Stats	2–7	Savage Arena (4,295); Toledo, Ohio
December 10*; 7:00 p.m.		IPFW	W 73–72; Stats	3–7	Savage Arena (3,983); Toledo, Ohio
December 12*; 3:00 p.m.		at Valparaiso	L 49–81; Stats	3–8	Athletics-Recreation Center (3,278); Valparaiso, Indiana
December 19*; 7:00 p.m.		Indiana State	L 54–55	3–9	Savage Arena (3,687); Toledo, Ohio
December 29*; 8:00 p.m.		at UIC	L 52–66	3–10	UIC Pavilion (2,406); Chicago, Illinois
January 4*; 7:00 p.m.		Alabama	L 50–67	3–11	Savage Arena (4,023); Toledo, Ohio
January 9; 2:30 p.m., FSN Ohio		Central Michigan	L 48–59	3–12 (0–1)	Savage Arena (5,199); Toledo, Ohio
January 13; 7:00 p.m.		at Eastern Michigan	L 59–74	3–13 (0–2)	Convocation Center (1,182); Ypsilanti, Michigan
January 17; 1:00 p.m., FSN Ohio		at Ball State	L 43–71	3–14 (0–3)	John E. Worthen Arena (3,295); Muncie, Indiana
January 20; 7:00 p.m.		Northern Illinois	L 54–58	3–15 (0–4)	Savage Arena (3,556); Toledo, Ohio
January 23; 2:00 p.m.		at Western Michigan	L 41–73	3–16 (0–5)	Alumni Arena (3,521); Kalamazoo, Michigan
January 26; 7:00 p.m.		Kent State	L 49–69	3–17 (0–6)	Savage Arena (4,358); Toledo, Ohio
January 30; 7:00 p.m.		at Akron	L 45–59	3–18 (0–7)	James A. Rhodes Arena (3,634); Akron, Ohio
February 1; 7:00 p.m.		at Bowling Green	L 47–58	3–19 (0–8)	Anderson Arena (2,042); Bowling Green, Ohio
February 4; 7:00 p.m.		Ohio	L 58–65 ^{OT}	3–20 (0–9)	Savage Arena (3,408); Toledo, Ohio
February 6; 7:00 p.m.		Buffalo	L 59–65	3–21 (0–10)	Savage Arena (4,565); Toledo, Ohio
February 10; 7:00 p.m.		at Miami (OH)	L 47–55	3–22 (0–11)	Millett Hall (1,143); Oxford, Ohio
February 14; 4:30 p.m.		at Central Michigan	L 46–63	3–23 (0–12)	Daniel P. Rose Center (2,074); Mount Pleasant, Michigan
February 17; 7:00 p.m.		Eastern Michigan	L 42–58	3–24 (0–13)	Savage Arena (3,558); Toledo, Ohio
February 20*; 6:00 p.m.		at Cleveland State	L 63–87	3–25	Wolstein Center (2,503); Cleveland, Ohio
February 24; 7:00 p.m.		Western Michigan	L 41–61	3–26 (0–14)	Savage Arena (3,398); Toledo, Ohio
February 27; 7:00 p.m.		Ball State	W 42–45	4–26 (1–14)	Savage Arena (3,892); Toledo, Ohio
March 4; 8:00 p.m.		at Northern Illinois	L 58–60	4–27 (1–15)	Convocation Center (1,233); DeKalb, Illinois
2010 MAC men's basketball tournament
March 7; 2:00 p.m.		at Buffalo; First Round	L 54–72	4–28	Alumni Arena (859); Buffalo, New York
*Non-conference game. ^{#}Rankings from AP Poll. All times are in Eastern Time Zone.
