= 2009–10 Miami RedHawks men's basketball team =

American college basketball season

2009–10 Miami RedHawks men's basketball
- Conference: Mid-American Conference
- East Division
- Record: 14–18 (9–7 MAC)
- Head coach: Charlie Coles
- Assistant coaches: Jermaine Henderson; Ryan Pedon; Jason Grunkemeyer
- Home arena: Millett Hall

2009–10 Mid-American Conference men's basketball standings
	Conf.				Overall
Team	W		L	PCT	W		L	PCT
East
Kent State	13	–	3	.813	24	–	10	.706
Akron	12	–	4	.750	24	–	11	.686
Miami	9	–	7	.563	14	–	18	.438
Buffalo	9	–	7	.563	18	–	12	.600
Ohio†	7	–	9	.438	22	–	15	.595
Bowling Green	6	–	10	.375	14	–	16	.467
West
Central Michigan	9	–	7	.563	15	–	15	.500
Eastern Michigan	8	–	8	.500	17	–	15	.531
Western Michigan	8	–	8	.500	18	–	15	.545
Ball State	8	–	8	.500	15	–	15	.500
Northern Illinois	6	–	10	.375	10	–	20	.333
Toledo	1	–	15	.063	4	–	28	.125
† Conference tournament winner Rankings from AP Poll

The 2009–10 Miami RedHawks basketball team represented Miami University in the college basketball season of 2009–10. The team was coached by Charlie Coles and played their homes game in Millett Hall.

== Before the season ==
=== Roster changes ===
The RedHawks lost two starters from last season, however they were able to keep one when forward Kenny Hayes was able to earn a Medical Redshirt and return to the team in 2009–10. The two players that Miami lost were 2009 MAC Basketball Player of the Year Michael Bramos and Tyler Dierkers, who earned the team a combined 28.1 points per game. They will be replaced by four new recruits one being Allen Roberts who Led Middletown "Middies" Ohio to a 19-3 record in 2008-09 and ended the regular season as the No. 3-ranked in the State (Rivals)

=== Recruiting ===
College recruiting information
Name	Hometown	School	Height	Weight	Commit date
Drew Kelly; PF	Franklin, TN	Centennial HS	6 ft 7 in (2.01 m)	250 lb (110 kg)	Sep 1, 2008
Drew Kelly; PF	Recruit ratings: Scout: Rivals: (86)				
Drew McGhee; C	North Ridgeville, OH	North Ridgeville HS	6 ft 11 in (2.11 m)	220 lb (100 kg)	Sep 4, 2008
Drew McGhee; C	Recruit ratings: Scout: Rivals: (85)				
Allen Roberts; SG	Middletown, OH	Middletown HS	6 ft 3 in (1.91 m)	205 lb (93 kg)	Aug 28, 2008
Allen Roberts; SG	Recruit ratings: Scout: Rivals: (85)				
Orlando Williams; SG	Cincinnati, OH	Princeton HS	6 ft 4 in (1.93 m)	180 lb (82 kg)	Aug 8, 2008
Orlando Williams; SG	Recruit ratings: Scout: (84)				
Overall recruit ranking:
Note: In many cases, Scout, Rivals, 247Sports, On3, and ESPN may conflict in their listings of height and weight.; In these cases, the average was taken. ESPN grades are on a 100-point scale.; Sources: "Miami-OH Commit List for 2009". Rivals.; "Scout.com: Men's Basketball Recruiting". Scout.; "Miami (OH) Basketball Recruiting 2009". ESPN.; "Scout.com Team Recruiting Rankings". Scout.; "2009 Team Ranking". Rivals.

== Roster ==
Roster current as of September 15, when their summer prospectus was published.

Name	Number	Position	Height	Weight	Year	Hometown
Antonio Ballard	35	F/G	6–4	199	Junior	Jefferson, Indiana
Adam Fletcher	41	C	6–8	226	Senior	St. Albans, West Virginia
Rodney Haddix, II	1	G	6–3	216	Junior	Georgetown, Kentucky
Kenny Hayes	14	G	6–2	183	Senior	Dayton, Ohio
Drew Kelley	00	F	6–7	250	Freshman	Franklin, Tennessee
Vince Legarza	55	C/F	6–9	265	Freshman	San Francisco, California
Julian Mavunga	4	F	6–8	252	Sophomore	Indianapolis, Indiana
Drew McGhee	50	C	6–11	220	Freshman	North Ridgeville, Ohio
Sean Mock	11	F	6–6	200	Junior	Oxford, Ohio
Allen Roberts	3	G	6–3	205	Freshman	Middletown, Ohio
Kramer Soderberg	12	G	6–0	172	Sophomore	St. Charles, Missouri
Adam Thomas	40	F	6–7	210	Sophomore	Springboro, Ohio
Orlando Williams	15	G	6–4	180	Freshman	Cincinnati, Ohio
Nick Winbush	20	F	6–7	213	Junior	Shaker Heights, Ohio

== Coaching staff ==
Name	Position	College	Graduating year
Charlie Coles	Head coach	Miami University	1965
Jermaine Henderson	Associate Head Coach	Miami University	1997
Ryan Pedon	Assistant coach	College of Wooster	2000
Jason Grunkemeyer	Assistant coach	Miami University	2001
Jimmy Lallathin	Director of Basketball Operations	Miami University	2003
Mike Young	Athletic trainer		

== Schedule ==
Date time, TV	Rank^{#}	Opponent^{#}	Result	Record	Site (attendance) city, state
November 1*; 3:00 p.m.		California (PA); Exhibition	W 82–65; Stats		Millett Hall (N/A); Oxford, Ohio
November 8*; 3:30 p.m.		Saginaw Valley State; Exhibition	W 70–48; Stats		Millett Hall (N/A); Oxford, Ohio
November 13*; 7:00 p.m.		at Towson	W 82–71; Stats	0–1	Towson Center (3,259); Towson, Maryland
November 16*; 7:00 p.m., FSN South		at No. 5 Kentucky	L 70–72; Stats	0–2	Rupp Arena (23,337); Lexington, Kentucky
November 20*; 8:00 p.m.		vs. Louisiana Tech; Basketball Travelers Tournament	L 62–74; Stats	0–3	University Arena (N/A); Albuquerque, New Mexico
November 21*; 8:00 p.m.		vs. Nicholls State; Basketball Travelers Tournament	W 69–58; Stats	1–3	University Arena (N/A); Albuquerque, New Mexico
November 22*; 6:15 p.m.		at New Mexico; Basketball Travelers Tournament	L 60–85; Stats	1–4	University Arena (10,986); Albuquerque, New Mexico
November 28*; 3:00 p.m.		Evansville	W 82–58; Stats	2–4	Millett Hall (2,319); Oxford, Ohio
December 2*; 7:00 p.m.		Dayton	L 58–65; Stats	2–5	Millett Hall (4,820); Oxford, Ohio
December 8*; 7:00 p.m.		Temple	L 42–64; Stats	2–6	Millett Hall (1,457); Oxford, Ohio
December 10*; 8:30 p.m., ESPN2		at No. 19 Cincinnati	L 59–63; Stats	2–7	US Bank Arena (6,280); Cincinnati, Ohio
December 13*; 3:00 p.m.		Wright State	W 56–55; Stats	3–7	Millett Hall (1,369); Oxford, Ohio
December 19*; 8:00 p.m.		at Milwaukee	L 61–68	3–8	U.S. Cellular Arena (2,532); Milwaukee, Wisconsin
December 23*; 7:00 p.m.		at Xavier	L 67–70	3–9	Cintas Center (10,250); Cincinnati, Ohio
January 5*; 9:00 p.m.		at Colorado	L 65–67	3–10	Coors Events Center (2,658); Boulder, Colorado
January 9; 4:00 p.m.		at Buffalo	L 55–73	3–11 (0–1)	Alumni Arena (2,429); Buffalo, New York
January 12; 7:00 p.m.		Kent State	W 55–53 ^{OT}	4–11 (1–1)	Millett Hall (1,299); Oxford, Ohio
January 16; 12:00 p.m.		Ohio	W 79–67	5–11 (2–1)	Millett Hall (2,204); Oxford, Ohio
January 20; 7:00 p.m.		at Akron	L 49–69	5–12 (2–2)	James A. Rhodes Arena (3,357); Akron, Ohio
January 23; 3:00 p.m.		Bowling Green	W 64–52	6–12 (3–2)	Millett Hall (2,213); Oxford, Ohio
January 26; 7:00 p.m.		at Ball State	L 59–65 ^{2OT}	6–13 (3–3)	John E. Worthen Arena (3,211); Muncie, Indiana
January 28; 7:00 p.m.		Central Michigan	W 64–51	7–13 (4–3)	Millett Hall (1,407); Oxford, Ohio
January 30; 12:00 p.m., ESPNU		Eastern Michigan	W 61–51	8–13 (5–3)	Millett Hall (1,759); Oxford, Ohio
February 4; 7:00 p.m.		at Western Michigan	W 56–54	9–13 (6–3)	University Center (3,032); Kalamazoo, Michigan
February 6; 4:00 p.m.		at Northern Illinois	W 74–69	10–13 (7–3)	Convocation Center (1,865); DeKalb, Illinois
February 10; 7:00 p.m.		Toledo	W 55–47	11–13 (8–3)	Millett Hall (1,143); Oxford, Ohio
February 14; 2:00 p.m.		at Bowling Green	L 64–67	11–14 (8–4)	Anderson Arena (1,867); Bowling Green, Ohio
February 17; 7:00 p.m.		Akron	L 56–61	11–15 (8–5)	Millett Hall (2,092); Oxford, Ohio
February 20*; 2:30 p.m.		Southeast Missouri State	W 69–53	12–15	Millett Hall (2,060); Oxford, Ohio
February 24; 7:00 p.m.		at Ohio	L 68–70	12–16 (8–6)	Convocation Center (7044); Athens, Ohio
February 27; 7:00 p.m.		at Kent State	L 58–66	12–17 (8–7)	Memorial Athletic and Convocation Center (5781); Kent, Ohio
March 4; 7:00 p.m.		Buffalo	W 73–62	13–17 (9–7)	Millett Hall (1486); Oxford, Ohio
MAC tournament
March 11	(4)	vs. (5) Buffalo; Quarterfinals	W 73–59	14–17	Quicken Loans Arena; Cleveland, OH
March 12	(4)	vs. (9) Ohio; Semifinals	L 42–54	14–18	Quicken Loans Arena; Cleveland, OH
*Non-conference game. ^{#}Rankings from AP Poll. (#) Tournament seedings in parentheses. All times are in Eastern.
