= 2009–10 Buffalo Bulls men's basketball team =

American college basketball season

2009–10 Buffalo Bulls men's basketball
- Conference: Mid-American Conference
- East Division
- Record: 18–12 (9–7 MAC)
- Head coach: Reggie Witherspoon
- Assistant coaches: Jim Kwitchoff; Kevin Heck; Turner Battle
- Home arena: Alumni Arena

2009–10 Mid-American Conference men's basketball standings
	Conf.				Overall
Team	W		L	PCT	W		L	PCT
East
Kent State	13	–	3	.813	24	–	10	.706
Akron	12	–	4	.750	24	–	11	.686
Miami	9	–	7	.563	14	–	18	.438
Buffalo	9	–	7	.563	18	–	12	.600
Ohio†	7	–	9	.438	22	–	15	.595
Bowling Green	6	–	10	.375	14	–	16	.467
West
Central Michigan	9	–	7	.563	15	–	15	.500
Eastern Michigan	8	–	8	.500	17	–	15	.531
Western Michigan	8	–	8	.500	18	–	15	.545
Ball State	8	–	8	.500	15	–	15	.500
Northern Illinois	6	–	10	.375	10	–	20	.333
Toledo	1	–	15	.063	4	–	28	.125
† Conference tournament winner Rankings from AP Poll

The 2009–10 Buffalo Bulls basketball team represented the University at Buffalo in the 2009–10 college basketball season. The team was coached by Reggie Witherspoon and played its home games in Alumni Arena.

== Before the season ==
=== Recruiting ===
College recruiting information
Name	Hometown	School	Height	Weight	Commit date
Mike Clifford; PF	Peabody, MA	Bishop Fenwick HS	6 ft 7 in (2.01 m)	230 lb (100 kg)	
Mike Clifford; PF	Recruit ratings: (78)				
Tony Watson; PG	Palm Beach Gardens, FL	Palm Beach Gardens HS	6 ft 2 in (1.88 m)	175 lb (79 kg)	Nov 19, 2008
Tony Watson; PG	Recruit ratings: (75)				
Overall recruit ranking:
Note: In many cases, Scout, Rivals, 247Sports, On3, and ESPN may conflict in their listings of height and weight.; In these cases, the average was taken. ESPN grades are on a 100-point scale.; Sources: "Buffalo Commit List for 2009". Rivals.; "Scout.com: Men's Basketball Recruiting". Scout.; "Buffalo Basketball Recruiting 2009". ESPN.; "Scout.com Team Recruiting Rankings". Scout.; "2009 Team Ranking". Rivals.

== Roster ==
No.	Name	Pos.	Height	Weight	Year	Hometown	Previous school
1	Tony Watson II	G	6' 2"	175	FR	West Palm Beach, FL	Palm Beach Gardens Community High School
2	Byron Mulkey	G	6' 0"	175	SR	Wheatfield, NY	Niagara-Wheatfield High School
3	Sean Smiley	G	6' 1"	170	SR	Erie, PA	McDowell High School
4	Rodney Pierce	G	6' 2"	200	SR	Buffalo, NY	Hutchinson Central Technical High School
5	Zach Filzen	G	6' 3"	190	SO	Northfield, MN	Northfield High School; Northern Arizona University
15	Derek Wolfley	F	6' 7"	230	FR	Attica, NY	Attica High School
21	Mitchell Watt	F	6' 10"	215	SO	Goodyear, AZ	Desert Edge High School
22	John Boyer	G	6' 1"	185	SR	Hollidaysburg, PA	Hollidaysburg Area High School
25	Calvin Betts	G/F	6' 4"	230	SR	Rochester, NY	Rush-Henrietta Senior High School
30	Titus Robinson	F	6' 7"	205	SO	Charlotte, NC	East Mecklenburg High School
32	Jawaan Alston	F	6' 8"	225	JR	Uniontown, PA	Albert Gallatin Area High School
33	Adekambi Laleye	F	6' 9"	225	SR	Ottawa, Ontario	Champlain St. Lambert
35	Mike Clifford	F	6' 7"	230	FR	Danvers, MA	Bishop Fenwick High School
40	Max Boudreau	F	6' 8"	240	SR	Montreal, Quebec	Champlain St. Lambert
42	Dave Barnett	G/F	6' 5"	200	SO	East Aurora, NY	East Aurora High School

== Coaching staff ==
Name	Position	College	Graduating year
Reggie Witherspoon	Head coach	Empire State College	1995
Jim Kwitchoff	Assistant coach	Boston College	1988
Kevin Heck	Assistant coach	Wayne State University	1995
Turner Battle	Assistant coach	University at Buffalo	2005
Kevin Lake	Video Coordinator		

== Schedule ==
Date time, TV	Rank^{#}	Opponent^{#}	Result	Record	Site city, state
November 15, 2009*; 5:30 pm ET		Vermont	L 58–57	0–1	Alumni Arena; Amherst, NY
November 19, 2009*; 7:00 pm ET		at Navy	W 63–53	1–1	Alumni Hall; Annapolis, MD
November 21, 2009*; 1:00 pm ET		at Towson	W 78–69 ^{OT}	2–1	Towson Center; Towson, MD
November 24, 2009*; 7:00 pm ET		Canisius	L 73–71	2–2	Alumni Arena; Amherst, NY
December 3, 2009*; 7:00 pm ET		Army	W 74–67	3–2	Alumni Arena; Amherst, NY
December 5, 2009*; 5:00 pm ET, Big Ten Network		at No. 4 Purdue	L 101–65	3–3	Mackey Arena; West Lafayette, IN
December 9, 2009*; 7:00 pm ET		at Niagara	W 86–80	4–3	Gallagher Center; Lewiston, NY
December 12, 2009*; 2:00 pm ET, Time Warner Cable SportsNet		Buffalo State	W 93–65	5–3	Alumni Arena; Amherst, NY
December 22, 2009*; 8:00 pm ET		at Wisconsin-Green Bay	W 71–65	6–3	Resch Center; Green Bay, WI
December 29, 2009*; 4:30 pm ET		vs. Jacksonville; UCF Holiday Classic	L 83–73	6–4	UCF Arena; Orlando, FL
December 30, 2009*; 4:30 pm ET		Liberty; UCF Holiday Classic	W 81–64	7–4	UCF Arena; Orlando, FL
January 9, 2010; 4:00 pm ET, Time Warner Cable SportsNet		Miami University	W 73–55	8–4 (1–0)	Alumni Arena; Amherst, NY
January 14, 2010; 7:00 pm ET		at Bowling Green	W 68–65	9–4 (2–0)	Anderson Arena; Bowling Green, OH
January 17, 2010; 2:00 pm ET		Akron	W 79–65	10–4 (3–0)	Alumni Arena; Amherst, NY
January 20, 2010; 7:00 pm ET		at Kent State	L 89–54	10–5 (3–1)	Memorial Athletic and Convocation Center; Kent, OH
January 23, 2010; 2:00 pm ET, Fox Sports Net, Time Warner Cable SportsNet		at Ohio	L 99–77	10–6 (3–2)	Convocation Center; Athens, OH
January 28, 2010; 7:00 pm ET, Time Warner Cable SportsNet		Ball State	L 75–69	10–7 (3–3)	Alumni Arena; Amherst, NY
January 30, 2010; 3:00 pm ET		at Northern Illinois	W 95–83	11–7 (4–3)	Convocation Center; DeKalb, IL
February 1, 2010; 7:00 pm ET		Western Michigan	L 85–70	11–8 (4–4)	Alumni Arena; Amherst, NY
February 4, 2010; 7:00 pm ET		at Central Michigan	L 88–82	11–9 (4–5)	Daniel P. Rose Center; Mount Pleasant, MI
February 6, 2010; 7:00 pm ET		at Toledo	W 65–59	12–9 (5–5)	Savage Arena; Toledo, OH
February 10, 2010; 7:00 pm ET, Time Warner Cable SportsNet		Eastern Michigan	W 84–67	13–9 (6–5)	Alumni Arena; Amherst, NY
February 13, 2010; 12:00 pm ET, ESPNU		Kent State	W 70–55	14–9 (7–5)	Alumni Arena; Amherst, NY
February 17, 2010; 7:00 pm ET, Time Warner Cable Sportsnet		Bowling Green	W 64–51	15–9 (8–5)	Alumni Arena; Amherst, NY
February 20, 2010*; 2:00 pm ET		at Saint Peter's	W 77–75 ^{OT}	16–9 (8–5)	Yanitelli Center; Jersey City, NJ
February 24, 2010; 7:00 pm ET		at Akron	L 77–67	16–10 (8–6)	James A. Rhodes Arena; Akron, OH
February 27, 2010; 7:00 pm ET		Ohio	W 72–69	17–10 (9–6)	Alumni Arena; Amherst, NY
March 4, 2010; 7:00 pm ET		at Miami University	L 73–62	17–11 (9–7)	Millett Hall; Oxford, OH
*Non-conference game. ^{#}Rankings from AP Poll. (#) Tournament seedings in parentheses.
