= 2009–10 Akron Zips men's basketball team =

American college basketball season

2009–10 Akron Zips men's basketball

CBI First Round
- Conference: Mid-American Conference
- East Division
- Record: 24–11 (12–4 MAC)
- Head coach: Keith Dambrot
- Assistant coaches: Rick McFadden; Lamont Paris; Terry Weigand
- Home arena: James A. Rhodes Arena

2009–10 Mid-American Conference men's basketball standings
	Conf.				Overall
Team	W		L	PCT	W		L	PCT
East
Kent State	13	–	3	.813	24	–	10	.706
Akron	12	–	4	.750	24	–	11	.686
Miami	9	–	7	.563	14	–	18	.438
Buffalo	9	–	7	.563	18	–	12	.600
Ohio†	7	–	9	.438	22	–	15	.595
Bowling Green	6	–	10	.375	14	–	16	.467
West
Central Michigan	9	–	7	.563	15	–	15	.500
Eastern Michigan	8	–	8	.500	17	–	15	.531
Western Michigan	8	–	8	.500	18	–	15	.545
Ball State	8	–	8	.500	15	–	15	.500
Northern Illinois	6	–	10	.375	10	–	20	.333
Toledo	1	–	15	.063	4	–	28	.125
† Conference tournament winner Rankings from AP Poll

The 2009–10 University of Akron Zips basketball team represented the University of Akron in the college basketball season of 2009–10. The Zips, led by head coach Keith Dambrot, are members of the Mid-American Conference and played their home games at James A. Rhodes Arena. They finished the season 24–11, 12–4 in MAC play, lost in the championship game of the 2010 MAC men's basketball tournament and were invited to the 2010 College Basketball Invitational where they lost in the first round.

== Before the season ==
=== Coaching changes ===
Assistant Coach Jeff Boals left the team to be a coach for the Ohio State Buckeyes men's basketball team under head coach Thad Matta. The Zips made sure that head coach Keith Dambrot stayed. Before the season began, The University voted for a two-year contract extension with Dambrot, that would keep him in Akron through the 2015–16 season. This comes after Dambrot's fifth season which the team. Within those five season, he has recorded a 115–51 (0.692) record, including a 64–8 (0.889) record at home.

=== Roster changes ===
Not much will change from last season's team. The Zips only lost one senior starter, 2009 MAC Tournament MVP Nate Linhart, to graduation and professional play in Austria. Along with Lenhart, letterman Eric Coblentz left the Zips to join NAIA team Malone University Pioneers. The team will meet up with Coblentz again, as the Zips have a match scheduled with them on September 12. To replace Linhart, the Zips recruited ESPN Top 100 recruit Zeke Marshall from McKeesport Area High School in Pennsylvania.

=== Recruiting ===
College recruiting information
Name	Hometown	School	Height	Weight	Commit date
Zeke Marshall; C	McKeesport, PA	McKeesport Area HS	6 ft 11.5 in (2.12 m)	209 lb (95 kg)	May 9, 2008
Zeke Marshall; C	Recruit ratings: Scout: Rivals: (92)				
Overall recruit ranking:
Note: In many cases, Scout, Rivals, 247Sports, On3, and ESPN may conflict in their listings of height and weight.; In these cases, the average was taken. ESPN grades are on a 100-point scale.; Sources: "Akron Commit List for 2009". Rivals.; "Scout.com: Men's Basketball Recruiting". Scout.; "Akron Basketball Recruiting 2009". ESPN.; "Scout.com Team Recruiting Rankings". Scout.; "2009 Team Ranking". Rivals.

== Roster ==
2009–10 Akron Zips men's basketball team
Players
Coaches

Pos.	#	Name	Height	Weight	Year	Hometown
C	54	Mike Bardo	6 ft 10 in (2.08 m)	240 lb (109 kg)	Jr	Cincinnati, Ohio
F	15	Tim Carroll	6 ft 5 in (1.96 m)	215 lb (98 kg)	Sr	Akron, Ohio
F	32	Jimmy Conyers	6 ft 5 in (1.96 m)	220 lb (100 kg)	Sr	Baltimore, Maryland
F	13	Nikola Cvetinović	6 ft 8 in (2.03 m)	230 lb (104 kg)	So	Loznica, Serbia
G	24	Anthony Hitchens	5 ft 9 in (1.75 m)	168 lb (76 kg)	So	Chillicothe, Ohio
C	44	Zeke Marshall	7 ft 0 in (2.13 m)	218 lb (99 kg)	Fr	McKeesport, Pennsylvania
G	5	Brett McClanahan	6 ft 4 in (1.93 m)	185 lb (84 kg)	So	Nitro, West Virginia
F	23	Brett McKnight	6 ft 6 in (1.98 m)	245 lb (111 kg)	Jr	Lancaster, Ohio
F	30	Chris McKnight	6 ft 7 in (2.01 m)	225 lb (102 kg)	Sr	Lancaster, Ohio
G	4	Steve McNees	6 ft 2 in (1.88 m)	170 lb (77 kg)	Jr	New Castle, Pennsylvania
F	42	C.J. Oldham	6 ft 5 in (1.96 m)	185 lb (84 kg)	Fr	Solon, Ohio
G	2	Kyle Peterson	6 ft 4 in (1.93 m)	180 lb (82 kg)	So	Naples, Florida
G	12	Darryl Roberts	6 ft 0 in (1.83 m)	165 lb (75 kg)	Sr	Toledo, Ohio
G	1	Ronnie Steward	5 ft 10 in (1.78 m)	175 lb (79 kg)	So	Columbus, Ohio
G	3	Alex Sullivan	5 ft 10 in (1.78 m)	175 lb (79 kg)	RS Fr	Painesville, Ohio
C	40	Steve Sweich	6 ft 9 in (2.06 m)	250 lb (113 kg)	So	Pittsburgh, Pennsylvania

Head coach

Keith Dambrot

Assistant coach(es)

Rick McFadden
Lamont Paris
Terry Weigand

Legend

- (C) Team captain
- (S) Suspended
- (I) Ineligible
- (W) Walk-on
- Injured
- Current redshirt

Roster
Last update: 2009-11-17

== Coaching staff ==
Name	Position	College	Graduating year
Keith Dambrot	Head coach	University of Akron	1982
Rick McFadden	Assistant coach	University of Akron	2005
Lamont Paris	Assistant coach	College of Wooster	1996
Terry Weigand	Assistant coach	Ashland University	1989
Dan Peters	Director of Basketball Operations	Kent State University	1976
Cedrick Middleton	Graduate Assistant	University of Akron	2008
Cole Pittis	Graduate Assistant - Video Services	Muskingum College	2006

== Schedule ==
Date time, TV	Rank^{#}	Opponent^{#}	Result	Record	Site (attendance) city, state
Exhibition
November 10*; 7:00 p.m.		Mount Union	W 88–38; Stats		James A. Rhodes Arena (1,058); Akron, Ohio
Regular Season
November 15*; 2:00 p.m.		Austin Peay; Glenn Wilkes Classic	L 77–80; Stats	0–1	James A. Rhodes Arena (2,360); Akron, Ohio
November 20*; 3:30 p.m.		vs. N.C. State; Glenn Wilkes Classic	L 45–66; Stats	0–2	Ocean Center (416); Daytona Beach, Florida
November 21*; 1:15 p.m.		vs. Drake; Glenn Wilkes Classic	W 63–59; Stats	1–2	Ocean Center (321); Daytona Beach, Florida
November 22*; 11:00 a.m.		vs. Howard; Glenn Wilkes Classic	W 69–52; Stats	2–2	Ocean Center (208); Daytona Beach, Florida
November 27*; 7:00 p.m.		Arkansas-Pine Bluff	W 68–65; Stats	3–2	James A. Rhodes Arena (2,115); Akron, Ohio
November 29*; 2:00 p.m.		Niagara	W 80–68; Stats	4–2	James A. Rhodes Arena (2,049); Akron, Ohio
December 4*; 8:00 p.m.		at No. 19 Texas A&M	L 62–74; Stats	4–3	Reed Arena (7,668); College Station, Texas
December 12*; 7:00 p.m.		Malone	W 62–30; Stats	5–3	James A. Rhodes Arena (3,381); Akron, Ohio
December 18*; 7:00 p.m.		UNC Greensboro	W 83–59; Stats	6–3	James A. Rhodes Arena (2,226); Akron, Ohio
December 20*; 2:00 p.m.		St. Francis (PA)	W 80–51; Stats	7–3	James A. Rhodes Arena (2,028); Akron, Ohio
December 22*; 7:00 p.m		Illinois-Chicago	W 77–65; Stats	8–3	James A. Rhodes Arena (2,267); Akron, Ohio
December 27*; 2:00 p.m.		Valparaiso	W 77–57; Stats	9–3	James A. Rhodes Arena (2,825); Akron, Ohio
December 30*; 9:00 p.m.		at Wyoming	W 85–76; Stats	10–3	Arena-Auditorium (4,414); Laramie, Wyoming
January 5*; 7:00 p.m.		Rhode Island	L 63–68	10–4	James A. Rhodes Arena (2,429); Akron, Ohio
January 9; 7:00 p.m.		Bowling Green	W 71–45	11–4 (1–0)	James A. Rhodes Arena (3,028); Akron, Ohio
January 13; 7:00 p.m.		at Ohio	W 67–62	12–4 (2–0)	Convocation Center (6,834); Athens, Ohio
January 17; 2:00 p.m.		at Buffalo	L 65–78	12–5 (2–1)	Alumni Arena (2,240); Buffalo, New York
January 20; 7:00 p.m.		Miami (OH)	W 69–46	13–5 (3–1)	James A. Rhodes Arena (3,357); Akron, Ohio
January 23; 12:00 p.m., ESPNU		at Kent State	L 70–87	13–6 (3–2)	Memorial Athletic and Convocation Center (6,204); Kent, Ohio
January 27; 7:00 p.m.		at Western Michigan	W 79–70	14–6 (4–2)	University Arena (3,041); Kalamazoo, Michigan
January 30; 7:00 p.m.		Toledo	W 59–45	15–6 (5–2)	James A. Rhodes Arena (3,634); Akron, Ohio
February 1; 7:00 p.m.		Eastern Michigan	L 59–62	15–7 (5–3)	James A. Rhodes Arena (2,674); Akron, Ohio
February 3; 7:00 p.m.		Northern Illinois	W 90–76	16–7 (6–3)	James A. Rhodes Arena (2,591); Akron, Ohio
February 6; 12:00 p.m.		at Ball State	W 75–70 ^{OT}	17–7 (7–3)	John E. Worthen Arena (3,062); Muncie, Indiana
February 9; 7:00 p.m.		at Central Michigan	W 56–52	18–7 (8–3)	Daniel P. Rose Center (760); Mt. Pleasant, Michigan
February 14; 2:00 p.m.		Ohio	W 91–88 ^{2OT}	19–7 (9–3)	James A. Rhodes Arena (3,469); Akron, Ohio
February 17; 7:00 p.m.		at Miami (OH)	W 61–56	20–7 (10–3)	Millett Hall (2,092); Oxford, Ohio
February 20*; 4:00 p.m., ESPNU		at VCU; ESPN BracketBusters	L 53–70	20–8	Stuart C. Siegel Center; Richmond, VA
February 24; 7:00 p.m.		Buffalo	W 77–67	21–8 (11–3)	James A. Rhodes Arena (3,975); Akron, Ohio
February 27; 2:30 p.m.		at Bowling Green	W 74–68	22–8 (12–3)	Anderson Arena (1,927); Bowling Green, Ohio
March 5; 8:00 p.m., ESPN2		Kent State	L 61–74	22–9 (12–4)	James A. Rhodes Arena (5,545); Akron, Ohio
2010 MAC men's basketball tournament
March 11; 2:50 p.m.	(3)	vs. (6) Eastern Michigan; Quarterfinals	W 97–89 ^{2OT}	23–9	Quicken Loans Arena (3,084); Cleveland, Ohio
March 12; 7:00 p.m.	(3)	vs. (7) Western Michigan; Semifinals	W 66–64	24–9	Quicken Loans Arena (NA); Cleveland, Ohio
March 13; 6:00 p.m., ESPN2	(3)	vs. (9) Ohio; Championship Game	L 75–81 ^{OT}	24–10	Quicken Loans Arena (9,533); Cleveland, Ohio
2010 College Basketball Invitational
March 17; 7:00 p.m.	(E2)	(E3) UW-Green Bay; First Round	L 66–70	24–11	James A. Rhodes Arena (877); Akron, Ohio
*Non-Conference Game. ^{#}Rankings from AP Poll. All times are in Eastern Time Zone.
