= 2009–10 Northern Illinois Huskies men's basketball team =

American college basketball season

2009–10 Northern Illinois Huskies men's basketball
- Conference: Mid-American Conference
- West Division
- Record: 10–20 (6–10 MAC)
- Head coach: Ricardo Patton
- Assistant coaches: Sundance Wicks; Will Smith; Todd Townsend
- Home arena: Convocation Center

2009–10 Mid-American Conference men's basketball standings
	Conf.				Overall
Team	W		L	PCT	W		L	PCT
East
Kent State	13	–	3	.813	24	–	10	.706
Akron	12	–	4	.750	24	–	11	.686
Miami	9	–	7	.563	14	–	18	.438
Buffalo	9	–	7	.563	18	–	12	.600
Ohio†	7	–	9	.438	22	–	15	.595
Bowling Green	6	–	10	.375	14	–	16	.467
West
Central Michigan	9	–	7	.563	15	–	15	.500
Eastern Michigan	8	–	8	.500	17	–	15	.531
Western Michigan	8	–	8	.500	18	–	15	.545
Ball State	8	–	8	.500	15	–	15	.500
Northern Illinois	6	–	10	.375	10	–	20	.333
Toledo	1	–	15	.063	4	–	28	.125
† Conference tournament winner Rankings from AP Poll

The 2009–10 Northern Illinois Huskies men's basketball team represented Northern Illinois University in the college basketball season of 2009–10. The team, led by head coached by Ricardo Patton, are members of the Mid-American Conference and played their homes game at the Convocation Center. They finished the season 10–20, 6–10 in MAC play and lost in the first round of the 2010 MAC men's basketball tournament.

== Before the season ==
=== Roster changes ===
The Huskies only lost one senior from last year's team. That player, Sean Smith, started in 29 of Northern Illinois' 30 games for that season (only one player had started all 30). He contributed an average 8.4 points per game. However, Northern Illinois has recruited two newcomers for their team. Xavier Silas, a transfer from Colorado, who made his Northern Illinois day-view after sitting out one year because of NCAA transfer rules. Another newcomer will be Keith Smith, who redshirted his first season.

The Huskies were predicted to finish 2nd in the MAC West.

== During the season ==
Northern Illinois had a rough start to its 2009-10 campaign. In the opening loss to Northwestern, Xavier Silas went down with a fracture on his shooting hand, an injury that would sideline him for one month. The loss was a tough blow for NIU, because Silas was expected to be a key contributor to the team after averaging double figures in scoring during his two years at Colorado.

Without Silas, the Huskies struggled through the non-conference schedule. They were 1-5 when Silas made his come back against Minnesota. In his first two games back, Silas shot the ball poorly, showing clear signs of being rusty after sitting out for a whole month. The Huskies lost both games and dropped to 1-7.

=== Tough loss to #18 Temple ===
With Silas back in form after his injury, Northern beat Maryland Eastern Shore behind his 19 points. After winning only their second game of the season, NIU prepared to face their first ranked opponent at home in a long time. The game was expected to be a blowout, but the Huskies hung tough for most of the game, but in the end Temple was just too much, winning 70-60.

=== 6-game winning streak ===
After losing to ranked Temple, Northern would go on to win their next 6 games, including their first 4 conference games. The 4-0 start in conference play marked the best start in school history.

During the 6-game winning streak, Silas averaged 22 points per contest.

=== 6-game losing streak ===
Northern Illinois traveled to Central Michigan to play a veteran Chippewa squad. After battling for most of the game, the Huskies fell short, losing 81-75 and snapping their winning streak.

Crossover play began against the East Division, widely considered the best of the MAC divisions. The Huskies struggled mightily against the East, losing their next 5 games, giving up 90 points or more in three of those games.

=== Recruiting ===
College recruiting information
Name	Hometown	School	Height	Weight	Commit date
Antone Christian	Nashville, TN	Martin Luther King HS	6 ft 1 in (1.85 m)	189 lb (86 kg)	
Antone Christian	Recruit ratings: No ratings found				
Tony Nixon; SG	South Holland, IL	Seton Academy	6 ft 4 in (1.93 m)	198 lb (90 kg)	Sep 22, 2008
Tony Nixon; SG	Recruit ratings: Scout: Rivals: (86)				
Overall recruit ranking:
Note: In many cases, Scout, Rivals, 247Sports, On3, and ESPN may conflict in their listings of height and weight.; In these cases, the average was taken. ESPN grades are on a 100-point scale.; Sources: "Northern Illinois Commit List for 2009". Rivals.; "Scout.com: Men's Basketball Recruiting". Scout.; "Northern Illinois Basketball Recruiting 2009". ESPN.; "Scout.com Team Recruiting Rankings". Scout.; "2009 Team Ranking". Rivals.

== Roster ==
Roster current as of September 9, when their summer prospectus was published.

Name	Number	Position	Height	Weight	Year	Hometown
Darion "Jake" Anderson	32	G	6–2	202	Junior	Chicago, Illinois
Antone Christian	3	G	6–1	189	Freshman	Nashville, Tennessee
Mike DiNunno	11	G	5–11	188	Sophomore	Chicago, Illinois
Ante Dzepina	15	C	6–8	230	Senior	Kraljevica, Croatia
Najul Ervin	2	F	6–5	219	Senior	Memphis, Tennessee
Michael Fakuade	55	C	6–7	227	Sophomore	Chicago, Illinois
Lee Fisher	30	F	6–5	210	Sophomore	Dolton, Illinois
Bryan Hall	1	G	6–1	162	Sophomore	Chicago, Illinois
Sean Kowal	41	C	6–11	248	Junior	St. Louis, Missouri
Jeremy Landers	24	G	6–2	185	Junior	Milwaukee, Wisconsin
Tony Nixon	25	G	6–4	198	Freshman	South Holland, Illinois
Michael Patton	4	G	5–10	181	Junior	Boulder, Colorado
Justin Peaster	22	G	5–11	171	Sophomore	Aurora, Illinois
Xavier Silas	13	G	6–5	201	Junior	Austin, Texas
Keith Smith	10	G	5–5	135	Freshman	Chicago, Illinois

== Coaching staff ==
Name	Position	College	Graduating year
Ricardo Patton	Head coach	Belmont University	1980
Sundance Wicks	Assistant coach	Northern State University	2003
Will Smith	Assistant coach	University of Colorado at Boulder	2000
Todd Townsend	Assistant coach	Marquette University	2005
Kent Dernbach	Director of Basketball Operations		
Kyle Schwan	Video Coordinator	Northern State University	2009

== Schedule ==
Date time, TV	Rank^{#}	Opponent^{#}	Result	Record	Site (attendance) city, state
Exhibition
November 1*; 7:00 p.m.		Aurora	W 93–59; Stats		Convocation Center; DeKalb, Illinois
November 6*; 7:00 p.m.		Marygrove College	W 120–50; Stats		Convocation Center; DeKalb, Illinois
Regular season
November 13*; 8:00 p.m.		at Northwestern	W 77–55; Stats	0–1	Welsh-Ryan Arena (4,057); Evanston, Illinois
November 17*; 8:00 p.m., ESPN360		at No. 23 Illinois	L 61–80; Stats	0–2	Assembly Hall (14,979); Champaign, Illinois
November 20*; 8:00 p.m.		Tennessee State	W 85–57; Stats	1–2	Convocation Center (1,590); DeKalb, Illinois
November 22; 4:30 p.m.		Southeast Missouri State	L 64–70^{OT} Stats	1–3	Convocation Center (825); DeKalb, Illinois
November 28*; 8:05 p.m.		at Northern Iowa	L 45–52; Stats	1–4	McLeod Center (4,083); Cedar Falls, Iowa
December 2*; 8:00 p.m.		Bradley	L 49–63; Stats	1–5	Convocation Center (3,064); DeKalb, Illinois
December 15*; 7:00 p.m.		at Minnesota	L 48–89; Stats	1–6	Williams Arena (12,055); Minneapolis, Minnesota
December 19*; 3:00 p.m.		at UIC	L 49–69; Stats	1–7	UIC Pavilion (3,299); Chicago, Illinois
December 22*; 2:00 p.m.		Maryland Eastern Shore	W 87–69; Stats	2–7	Convocation Center (704); DeKalb, Illinois
December 30*; 7:00 p.m.		No. 18 Temple	L 60–70; Stats	2–8	Convocation Center (1,234); DeKalb, Illinois
January 2*; 3:00 p.m.		North Dakota	W 66–45; Stats	3–8	Convocation Center (1,024); DeKalb, Illinois
January 6*; 7:00 p.m.		at Chicago State	W 99–93; Stats	4–8	Emil and Patricia Jones Convocation Center (1,668); Chicago, Illinois
January 9; 2:00 p.m.		at Ball State	W 62–48; Stats	5–8 (1–0)	John E. Worthen Arena (2,725); Muncie, Indiana
January 13; 7:00 p.m.		Western Michigan	W 87–77; Stats	6–8 (2–0)	Convocation Center (1,463); DeKalb, Illinois
January 16; 4:00 p.m.		Eastern Michigan	W 77–69	7–8 (3–0)	Convocation Center (2,003); DeKalb, Illinois
January 20; 7:00 p.m.		at Toledo	W 58–54	8–8 (4–0)	Savage Arena (3,556); Toledo, Ohio
January 23; 6:30 p.m.		at Central Michigan	L 75–81	8–9 (4–1)	Daniel P. Rose Center (2,317); Mount Pleasant, Michigan
January 27; 8:00 p.m.		Ohio	L 84–99	8–10 (4–2)	Convocation Center (1,498); DeKalb, Illinois
January 30; 2:00 p.m.		Buffalo	L 83–95	8–11 (4–3)	Convocation Center (3,448); DeKalb, Illinois
February 1; 7:00 p.m.		at Kent State	L 46–76	8–12 (4–4)	Memorial Athletic and Convocation Center (3,030); Kent, Ohio
February 3; 7:00 p.m.		at Akron	L 76–90	8–13 (4–5)	James A. Rhodes Arena (2,591); Akron, Ohio
February 6; 4:00 p.m.		Miami (OH)	L 69–74	8–14 (4–6)	Convocation Center (1,865); DeKalb, Illinois
February 10; 7:00 p.m.		at Bowling Green	L 69–73	8–15 (4–7)	Anderson Arena (1,347); Bowling Green, Ohio
February 13; 4:00 p.m.		Ball State	L 66–71	8–16 (4–8)	Convocation Center (1,537); DeKalb, Illinois
February 17; 7:00 p.m.		at Western Michigan	L 81–90	8–17 (4–9)	University Arena (3,016); Kalamazoo, Michigan
February 20*; 7:00 p.m., ESPNU		at Eastern Illinois; ESPNU BracketBusters	L 73–71 stats	8–18 (4–9)	Lantz Arena (1787); Charleston, Illinois
February 24; 8:00 p.m.		Central Michigan	W 67–65 stats	9–18 (5–9)	Convocation Center (925); DeKalb, Illinois
February 27; 2:00 p.m.		at Eastern Michigan	L 66–60 stats	9–19 (5–10)	Convocation Center (1499); Ypsilanti, Michigan
March 4; 8:00 p.m.		Toledo	W 60–58 stats	10–19 (6–10)	Convocation Center (1322); DeKalb, Illinois
Mid-American Conference tournament
March 7; 2:00 p.m.		Eastern Michigan; First Round	L 59–65 stats	10–20	Convocation Center (675); Ypsilanti, Michigan
*Non-Conference Game. ^{#}Rankings from AP Poll. All times are in Eastern Time Zone.

== Statistics ==
Legend
GP	Games played	GS	Games started	MPG	Minutes per game
FG%	Field-goal percentage	3P%	3-point field-goal percentage	FT%	Free-throw percentage
RPG	Rebounds per game	Ast	Assists	Blk	Blocks
Stl	Steals	PPG	Points per game

Player	GP	GS	MPG	FG%	3P%	FT%	RPG	Ast	Blk	Stl	PPG
Xavier Silas	25	25	31.6	.383	.321	.811	5.3	41	12	20	19.7
Darion Anderson	30	28	27.9	.399	.208	.745	6.0	104	6	37	10.6
Sean Kowal	30	12	25.5	.542	1.000	.542	6.4	19	25	22	10.5
Mike Dinunno	30	21	23.7	.312	.290	.629	1.6	91	0	29	7.0
Tony Nixon	30	5	14.9	.362	.333	.440	1.6	15	2	6	4.3
Lee Fisher	28	21	18.8	.481	.000	.550	3.9	20	4	18	4.0
Michael Patton	27	2	13.1	.365	.333	.818	0.7	15	0	11	3.8
Michael Fakuade	30	15	11.6	.385	.273	.516	3.0	9	30	9	3.5
Bryan Hall	20	3	14.9	.538	1.000	.550	1.0	40	1	12	2.8
Tyler Storm	26	1	7.6	.322	.265	.692	1.2	9	0	8	2.2
Najul Ervin	28	10	13.0	.543	.000	.286	2.5	16	17	11	1.9
Jeremy Landers	26	6	8.7	.314	.222	.571	1.0	10	1	12	1.4
Ante Dzepina	24	1	7.2	.297	.000	.421	2.0	7	7	3	1.3
Justin Peaster	2	0	1.0	.000	.000	.500	0.0	0	0	0	0.5
Keith Smith	7	0	2.9	.000	.000	.000	0.6	3	0	0	0.0

- Source: Northern Illinois Combined Team Statistics - March 10, 2010
