= 2009–10 Ball State Cardinals men's basketball team =

American college basketball season

2009–10 Ball State Cardinals men's basketball
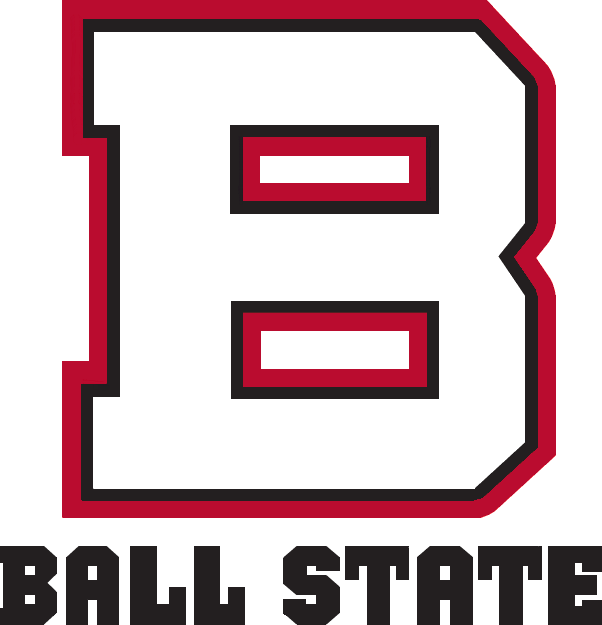
- Conference: Mid-American Conference
- West Division
- Record: 15–15 (8–8 MAC)
- Head coach: Billy Taylor
- Assistant coaches: Bob Simmons; Joseph Price; Jay Newberry
- Home arena: Worthen Arena

2009–10 Mid-American Conference men's basketball standings
	Conf.				Overall
Team	W		L	PCT	W		L	PCT
East
Kent State	13	–	3	.813	24	–	10	.706
Akron	12	–	4	.750	24	–	11	.686
Miami	9	–	7	.563	14	–	18	.438
Buffalo	9	–	7	.563	18	–	12	.600
Ohio†	7	–	9	.438	22	–	15	.595
Bowling Green	6	–	10	.375	14	–	16	.467
West
Central Michigan	9	–	7	.563	15	–	15	.500
Eastern Michigan	8	–	8	.500	17	–	15	.531
Western Michigan	8	–	8	.500	18	–	15	.545
Ball State	8	–	8	.500	15	–	15	.500
Northern Illinois	6	–	10	.375	10	–	20	.333
Toledo	1	–	15	.063	4	–	28	.125
† Conference tournament winner Rankings from AP Poll

The 2009–10 Ball State Cardinals basketball team represented Ball State University in the college basketball season of 2009–10. The team was coached by Billy Taylor and played their homes game in the John E. Worthen Arena.

== Before the season ==
=== Roster changes ===
The Cardinals lost three starters from last year's squad due to graduation. Of those three seniors, Brandon Lampley was the only one with a double digit Points-per-game statistic, with 10.0 points per game. Along with him were two other guards from the team, Laron Frazier and Rob Giles. Along with these three players, Ball State also lost three other players, one of those being Anthony Newell. Newell was only five points away from breaking 1,000 points within Ball State's men's basketball team when he broke his leg in a 46–42 victory over Eastern Michigan. Junior Eric Wormely also left the team when he transferred to another college for more playing time. Sophomore KeAundre Peak, who was a key contributor, also transferred and chose Indiana State.

No transfers came in to Ball State for the 2009–2010 season. All four recruits are new freshmen.

=== Recruiting ===
College recruiting information
Name	Hometown	School	Height	Weight	Commit date
Huzie Hambrite; PG	Mattoon, Illinois	Lake Land JC	5 ft 10 in (1.78 m)	175 lb (79 kg)	Nov 14, 2009
Huzie Hambrite; PG	Recruit ratings: Scout:				
Myron Green; SG	Carson, California	Dominguez HS	6 ft 4 in (1.93 m)	200 lb (91 kg)	
Myron Green; SG	Recruit ratings: (79)				
Jauwan Scaife; SG	Muncie, Indiana	Muncie Central HS	6 ft 2 in (1.88 m)	185 lb (84 kg)	May 20, 2009
Jauwan Scaife; SG	Recruit ratings: Scout: (83)				
Overall recruit ranking:
Note: In many cases, Scout, Rivals, 247Sports, On3, and ESPN may conflict in their listings of height and weight.; In these cases, the average was taken. ESPN grades are on a 100-point scale.; Sources: "Ball State Commit List for 2009". Rivals.; "Scout.com: Men's Basketball Recruiting". Scout.; "Ball State Basketball Recruiting 2009". ESPN.; "Scout.com Team Recruiting Rankings". Scout.; "2009 Team Ranking". Rivals.

== Roster ==
Name	Number	Position	Height	Weight	Year	Hometown
Brawley Chisholm	5	G	6–2	165	Senior	Bronx, New York
Randy Davis	3	G	5–11	170	Sophomore	Plymouth, Indiana
Zach Fields	50	C	6–10	280	Freshman	North Vernon, Indiana
John Green	24	G	6–3	180	Freshman	Osceola, Indiana
Myron Green Jr.	11	G/F	6–4	200	Freshman	Carson, California
Zach Harrison	23	G	6–2	165	Freshman	Terre Haute, Indiana
Will Hauser	0	G/F	6–4	215	Freshman	Grovertown, Indiana
Mo Hubbard	30	F	6–6	216	Sophomore	Chantilly, Virginia
Jarrod Jones	45	F/C	6–9	225	Sophomore	Michigan City, Indiana
Malik Perry	1	F	6–4	240	Junior	Philadelphia, Pennsylvania
Jauwan Scaife	4	G	6–2	190	Freshman	Muncie, Indiana
Pierre Sneed	34	G	6–4	195	Sophomore	Chicago, Illinois
Terrence Watson	2	F	6–5	211	Senior	Detroit, Michigan

== Coaching staff ==
Name	Position	College	Graduating year
Billy Taylor	Head coach	Notre Dame University	1995
Bob Simmons	Assistant coach	Wilkes University	1993
Joseph Price	Assistant coach	Notre Dame University	1986
Jay Newberry	Assistant coach	Rollins College	2000
Mitch Gilfillan	Director of Basketball Operations	Lehigh University	2006
Jason Roberson	Strength & conditioning coach		
Troy Hershman	Athletic trainer		

== Schedule ==
Date time, TV	Rank^{#}	Opponent^{#}	Result	Record	Site (attendance) city, state
Regular season
November 13*; 7:00 p.m.		Valparaiso	W 88–78; Stats	1–0	John E. Worthen Arena (4,175); Muncie, Indiana
November 21*; 2:00 p.m.		SIU Edwardsville	W 57–47; Stats	2–0	John E. Worthen Arena (3,337); Muncie, Indiana
November 24*; 7:30 p.m.		at Temple	L 46–66	2–1	Liacouras Center (3,597); Philadelphia, Pennsylvania
November 28*; 1:00 p.m.		UC Davis	L 58–60	2–2	John E. Worthen Arena (2,696); Muncie, Indiana
December 2*; 7:00 p.m.		No. 23 Butler	L 59–38	2–3	John E. Worthen Arena (6,996); Muncie, Indiana
December 9*; 8:05 p.m.		at Indiana State	W 68–63; Stats	3–3	Hulman Center (7,144); Terre Haute, Indiana
December 12*; 3:00 p.m.		at Tennessee Tech	L 86–81^{OT}	3–4	Eblen Center (1,045); Cookeville, Tennessee
December 19*; 4:00 p.m., Big Ten Network		vs. No. 4 Purdue; John R. Wooden Tradition	L 69–49	3–5	Conseco Fieldhouse (7,813); Indianapolis, Indiana
December 21*; 7:00 p.m.		North Carolina Central	W 59–45; Stats	4–5	John E. Worthen Arena (2,873); Muncie, Indiana
December 28*; 7:00 p.m.		Maryland Eastern Shore	W 56–47	5–5	John E. Worthen Arena (2,903); Muncie, Indiana
December 31*; 4:00 p.m.		Manchester	W 69–55	6–5	John E. Worthen Arena (3,098); Muncie, Indiana
January 5*; 8:00 p.m.		at Dayton	L 59–35	6–6	University of Dayton Arena (13,167); Dayton, Ohio
January 9; 2:00 p.m.		Northern Illinois	L 62–48	6–7 (0–1)	John E. Worthen Arena (2,725); Muncie, Indiana
January 13; 7:00 p.m.		at Central Michigan	L 53–38	6–8 (0–2)	Daniel P. Rose Center (2,112); Mount Pleasant, Michigan
January 17; 1:00 p.m., FSN Indiana		Toledo	W 71–43	7–8 (1–2)	John E. Worthen Arena (3,295); Muncie, Indiana
January 20; 7:00 p.m.		Western Michigan	W 75–68	8–8 (2–2)	John E. Worthen Arena (3,032); Muncie, Indiana
January 23; 2:00 p.m.		at Eastern Michigan	L 57–53	8–9 (2–3)	Convocation Center (1,380); Ypsilanti, Michigan
January 26; 7:00 p.m.		Miami (OH)	W 65–59 ^{2OT}	9–9 (3–3)	John E. Worthen Arena (3,211); Muncie, Indiana
January 28; 7:00 p.m.		at Buffalo	W 75–69	10–9 (4–3)	Alumni Arena (1,781); Buffalo, New York
January 31; 2:00 p.m.		at Ohio	W 67–66	11–9 (5–3)	Convocation Center (5,596); Athens, Ohio
February 4; 7:00 p.m.		Bowling Green	W 64–59	12–9 (6–3)	John E. Worthen Arena (2,958); Muncie, Indiana
February 6; 12:00 p.m., FSN Indiana		Akron	L 70–75	12–10 (6–4)	John E. Worthen Arena (3,062); Muncie, Indiana
February 10; 7:00 p.m.		at Kent State	L 42–76	12–11 (6–5)	Memorial Athletic and Convocation Center (2,825); Kent, Ohio
February 13; 4:00 p.m.		at Northern Illinois	W 71–66	13–11 (7–5)	Convocation Center (1,537); DeKalb, Illinois
February 17; 7:00 p.m.		Central Michigan	W 69–63	14–11 (8–5)	John E. Worthen Arena (3,505); Muncie, Indiana
February 20*; 2:00 p.m.		UT Martin	W 68–52	15–11	John E. Worthen Arena (3,451); Muncie, Indiana
February 24; 7:00 p.m.		Eastern Michigan	L 67–72	15–12 (8–6)	John E. Worthen Arena; Muncie, Indiana
February 27; 7:00 p.m.		at Toledo	L 42–45	15–13 (8–7)	Savage Arena; Toledo, Ohio
March 4; 7:00 p.m.		at Western Michigan	L 52–67	15–14 (8–8)	University Arena; Kalamazoo, Michigan
MAC tournament
March 7	(9)	at (8) Ohio; MAC First Round	L 77–85 ^{OT}	15–15	Convocation Center; Athens, OH
*Non-conference game. ^{#}Rankings from AP Poll. (#) Tournament seedings in parentheses.
