= 2009–10 Western Michigan Broncos men's basketball team =

American college basketball season

2009–10 Western Michigan Broncos men's basketball
- Conference: Mid-American Conference
- West Division
- Record: 18–15 (8–8 MAC)
- Head coach: Steve Hawkins
- Assistant coaches: Bacari Alexander; Clayton Bates; Rick Carter
- Home arena: University Arena

2009–10 Mid-American Conference men's basketball standings
| | Conf. | | | | Overall |
| Team | W | | L | PCT | W | | L | PCT |
|---|---|---|---|---|---|---|---|---|
East
| Kent State | 13 | – | 3 | .813 | 24 | – | 10 | .706 |
| Akron | 12 | – | 4 | .750 | 24 | – | 11 | .686 |
| Miami | 9 | – | 7 | .563 | 14 | – | 18 | .438 |
| Buffalo | 9 | – | 7 | .563 | 18 | – | 12 | .600 |
| Ohio† | 7 | – | 9 | .438 | 22 | – | 15 | .595 |
| Bowling Green | 6 | – | 10 | .375 | 14 | – | 16 | .467 |
West
| Central Michigan | 9 | – | 7 | .563 | 15 | – | 15 | .500 |
| Eastern Michigan | 8 | – | 8 | .500 | 17 | – | 15 | .531 |
| Western Michigan | 8 | – | 8 | .500 | 18 | – | 15 | .545 |
| Ball State | 8 | – | 8 | .500 | 15 | – | 15 | .500 |
| Northern Illinois | 6 | – | 10 | .375 | 10 | – | 20 | .333 |
| Toledo | 1 | – | 15 | .063 | 4 | – | 28 | .125 |
† Conference tournament winner Rankings from AP Poll

The 2009–10 Western Michigan Broncos men's basketball team was an NCAA Division I college basketball team representing Western Michigan University. The team was the two-time defending Mid-American Conference (MAC) West Division champion. WMU was coached by Steve Hawkins who was in his seventh season as head coach of the school. The Broncos played their home games at University Arena in Kalamazoo, Michigan. They finished the season 18–15, 8–8 in MAC play and lost in the semifinals of the 2010 MAC men's basketball tournament.

== Pre-season ==
Western Michigan was picked to finish fifth in the MAC's West Division by members of the MAC News Media Panel. The Broncos received four first-place votes. Senior guard David Kool was selected to the All-MAC West Division Pre-season team.

This season also marked the return of assistant coach Clayton Bates who had left the team for a season in order to work in the private sector. Bates previously served as assistant coach at Western Michigan for eight seasons. Bates replaced former assistant coach Andy Hipsher. Hipsher left WMU to become director of basketball operations at USF.

== Awards ==
- David Kool
  - All-MAC West Division Pre-season team
  - West Division Player of the Week
    - Week 5 – For the week, Kool averaged 23.5 points per game on 45.7% shooting, 42.9% shooting from three-point range and 100% shooting from the free throw line. Against Eastern Illinois, Kool produced the highest-scoring game of any player in the MAC this season with 34 points. He made a career-high eight three-pointers out of a career-high 11 field goals in 18 attempts.
    - Week 6 – In WMU's only game of the week, Kool led his team over Kennesaw State with 20 points, seven rebounds, two assists and two steals. Kool scored nine of WMU's final 11 points of the game, including a three-pointer with 2:16 remaining that gave WMU the lead for the rest of the game.
  - Mid-American Conference Male Scholar Athlete of the Week
    - Week 15 (Dec. 18)
    - Week 16 (Dec. 23)
    - Week 18 (Jan. 8)
- Martelle McLemore
  - West Division Player of the Week
    - Week 2 – Set career highs with 22 points, nine rebounds and four assists against VCU. McLemore converted on 9–13 from the field, including 8–9 on two-point field goals and 3–3 free throw shooting.
- Alex Wolf
  - West Division Player of the Week
    - Week 7 – Wolf earned player of the week honors based on his performance at the Diamond Head Classic.
  - Mid-American Conference Male Scholar Athlete of the Week
    - Week 17 (Jan. 1)

== Diamond Head Classic ==
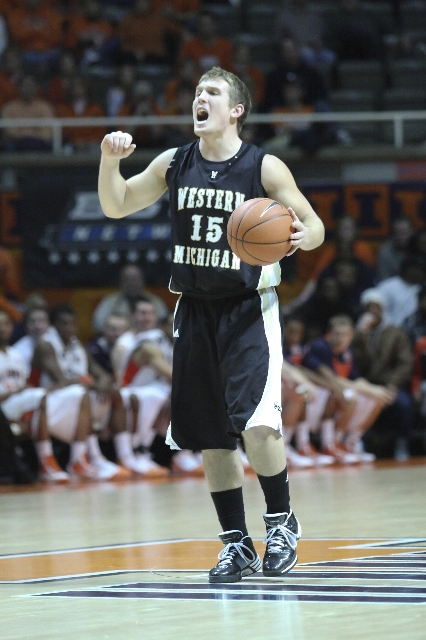
Diamond Head Classic surprise Alex Wolf, in a game against the University of Illinois.

The Broncos finished fifth out of eight teams in the December 2009 Diamond Head Classic. After losing the first game to eventual champion USC, WMU defeated Northeastern and the College of Charleston to finish the tournament 2–1. Western Michigan led USC 27–18 at the half and 47–46 with 4:24 to go in the game. WMU gave champion USC their toughest game of the tournament.

The tournament was the breakout performance for junior walk-on guard Alex Wolf, who scored 28 total points in the final two games of the tournament. Wolf had scored only 11 career points until the point. In the tournament, Wolf earned career highs in points (15) and rebounds (5) and made his first career three-point field goal. Wolf averaged 11 points, four rebounds and one assist per game and made six out of eight three-point field goals and four out of six free throws. For his accomplishments, Wolf was named MAC West Co-Player of the Week.

== Roster ==
| No. | Name | Pos. | Height | Weight | Year | Hometown (Previous school) |
|---|---|---|---|---|---|---|
| 25 | David Brown | G | 6'3" | 213 | Fr. | Roscoe, IL (Hononegah) |
| 32 | Muhammed Conteh | F/C | 6'7" | 232 | So. | Bloomington, IN (Providence School) |
| 5 | Mike Douglas | G | 6'0" | 177 | So. | Detroit, MI (Finney) |
| 22 | Austin Harper | G | 6'2" | 176 | Fr. | Grand Haven, MI (Grand Haven) |
| 11 | Nate Hutcheson | F | 6'7" | 206 | Fr. | Marion, IA (Linn-Mar) |
| 23 | David Kool | G | 6'3" | 213 | Sr. | Grand Rapids, MI (South Christian) |
| 24 | Donald Lawson | C | 6'10" | 243 | Sr. | Chicago, IL (Leo Catholic) |
| 3 | Martelle McLemore | G/F | 6'5" | 205 | Sr. | Detroit, MI (Consortium Prep) |
| 10 | Brandon Pokley | G | 6'4" | 176 | Fr. | Clarkston, MI (Clarkston) |
| 50 | Nick Stapert | C | 6'8" | 230 | Fr. | Gobles, MI (Gobles) |
| 1 | Demetrius Ward | G | 6'3" | 208 | So. | Detroit, MI (Pershing) |
| 33 | Flenard Whitfield | F | 6'7" | 222 | So. | Detroit, MI (Martin Luther King) |
| 21 | Shayne Whittington | C | 6'10" | 210 | Fr. | Paw Paw, MI (Lawrence) |
| 15 | Alex Wolf | G | 6'0" | 198 | Jr. | Parchment, MI (Parchment) |

== Schedule ==
| Date time, TV | Rank^{#} | Opponent^{#} | Result | Record | Site (attendance) city, state |
Exhibition
| 11/7/09*; 2:00pm | | Kalamazoo College | W 78–52 | 0–0 | University Arena (2,097); Kalamazoo, MI |
| 11/11/09*; 7:00pm | | Spring Arbor | W 81–51 | 0–0 | University Arena (2,644); Kalamazoo, MI |
Regular season
| 11/15/09*; 3:00pm | | at Detroit | W 86–80 | 0–1 | Calihan Hall (3,840); Detroit, MI |
| 11/18/09*; 7:00pm | | VCU | W 83–67 | 1–1 | University Arena (2,654); Kalamazoo, MI |
| 11/23/09*; 8:00pm, WYIN, ESPN Full Court | | at Loyola (IL) | W 60–58 | 1–2 | Gentile Center (1,848); Chicago, IL |
| 11/28/09*; 2:00pm | | Holy Cross | W 64–54 | 2–2 | University Arena (2,671); Kalamazoo, MI |
| 12/1/09*; 7:00pm | | Temple | W 76–70 | 2–3 | University Arena (3,086); Kalamazoo, MI |
| 12/9/09*; 8:30pm | | at Eastern Illinois | W 69–58 | 3–3 | Lantz Arena (1,033); Charleston, IL |
| 12/13/09*; 2:30pm, Big Ten Network | | at Illinois | W 88–53 | 3–4 | Assembly Hall (14,886); Urbana, IL |
| 12/19/09*; 4:00pm | | Kennesaw State | W 72–64 | 4–4 | University Arena (2,612); Kalamazoo, MI |
| 12/22/09*; 5:00pm, ESPNU | | vs. USC; Diamond Head Classic | W 55–51 | 4–5 | Stan Sheriff Center (6,892); Honolulu, HI |
| 12/23/09*; 3:00pm, ESPNU | | vs. Northeastern; Diamond Head Classic | W 75–60 | 5–5 | Stan Sheriff Center (N/A); Honolulu, HI |
| 12/25/09*; 4:30pm | | vs. College of Charleston; Diamond Head Classic | W 66–63 | 6–5 | Stan Sheriff Center (5,402); Honolulu, HI |
| 1/3/09*; 2:00pm | | Sam Houston State | W 74–73 | 7–5 | University Arena (2,693); Kalamazoo, MI |
| 1/5/09*; 7:00pm | | Michigan–Dearborn | W 86–45 | 8–5 | University Arena (2,362); Kalamazoo, MI |
| 1/9/09; 4:00pm | | Eastern Michigan; Michigan MAC Trophy | W 61–47 | 9–5 (1–0) | University Arena (3,224); Kalamazoo, MI |
| 1/13/09; 8:00pm | | at Northern Illinois | W 87–77 | 9–6 (1–1) | Convocation Center (1,463); DeKalb, IL |
| 1/16/09; 2:00pm | | Central Michigan; Michigan MAC Trophy | W 70–61 | 10–6 (2–1) | University Arena (4,656); Kalamazoo, MI |
| 1/20/09; 7:00pm | | at Ball State | W 75–68 | 10–7 (2–2) | Worthen Arena (3,032); Muncie, IN |
| 1/23/09; 2:00pm | | Toledo | W 73–41 | 11–7 (3–2) | University Arena (3,521); Kalamazoo, MI |
| 1/27/09; 7:00pm | | Akron | W 79–70 | 11–8 (3–3) | University Arena (3,041); Kalamazoo, MI |
| 1/30/09; 2:00pm, Fox Sports Detroit | | at Kent State | W 74–73 | 11–9 (3–4) | Memorial Athletic and Convocation Center (3,961); Kent, OH |
| 2/1/09; 7:00pm | | at Buffalo | W 85–70 | 12–9 (4–4) | Alumni Arena (1,301); Buffalo, NY |
| 2/4/09; 7:00pm | | Miami | W 56–54 | 12–10 (4–5) | University Arena (3,032); Kalamazoo, MI |
| 2/6/09; 2:00pm | | Bowling Green | W 65–64 | 13–10 (5–5) | University Arena (3,515); Kalamazoo, MI |
| 2/9/09; 7:00pm | | at Ohio | W 90–74 | 13–11 (5–6) | Convocation Center (2,880); Athens, OH |
| 2/14/09; 2:00pm, Fox Sports Detroit | | at Eastern Michigan; Michigan MAC Trophy | W 66–52 | 13–12 (5–7) | Convocation Center (1,094); Ypsilanti, MI |
| 2/17/09; 7:00pm, Fox Sports Detroit Plus | | Northern Illinois | W 90–81 | 14–12 (6–7) | University Arena (3,016); Kalamazoo, MI |
| 2/20/09*; 3:00pm | | at Southern Illinois; BracketBusters | W 89–72 | 14–13 | SIU Arena (4,151); Carbondale, IL |
| 2/24/09; 7:00pm | | at Toledo | W 61–41 | 15–13 (7–7) | Savage Arena (3,398); Toledo, OH |
| 2/27/09; 6:30pm, Fox Sports Detroit | | at Central Michigan; Michigan MAC Trophy | W 74–66 | 15–14 (7–8) | Rose Arena (3,504); Mt. Pleasant, MI |
| 3/4/09; 7:00pm | | Ball State | W 67–52 | 16–14 (8–8) | University Arena (3,121); Kalamazoo, MI |
MAC Tournament
| 3/7/09; 2:00pm | | Bowling Green; MAC tournament first round | W 75–73 | 17–14 | University Arena (1,786); Kalamazoo, MI |
| 3/11/09; 12:00pm, Fox Sports Detroit | | vs. Central Michigan; MAC Tournament quarterfinals | W 69–60 | 18–14 | Quicken Loans Arena (N/A); Cleveland, OH |
| 3/12/09; 7:00pm, ESPN Full Court | | vs. Akron; MAC Tournament semifinals | W 66–64 | 18–15 | Quicken Loans Arena (N/A); Cleveland, OH |
*Non-conference game. ^{#}Rankings from AP Poll. (#) Tournament seedings in parentheses. All times are in Eastern Time.
