= 2010 MAC men's basketball tournament =

- Logo for the 2010 Mid-American Conference tournament
- Classification: Division I
- Season: 2009–10
- Teams: 12
- Site: Quicken Loans Arena; Cleveland, Ohio
- Champions: Ohio Bobcats (5th title)
- Winning coach: John Groce (1st title)
- MVP: Armon Bassett (Ohio)
- Top scorer: Armon Bassett (Ohio) (116 points)
- Television: FSN Ohio, FSN Detroit, and ESPN2
- MAC men's basketball tournaments

The 2010 Mid-American Conference men's basketball tournament was the post-season men's basketball tournament for the Mid-American Conference (MAC) 2009–2010 season. Ninth-seeded Ohio won the tournament received the MAC's automatic bid into the NCAA Men's Division I Basketball Championship tournament. There they defeated Georgetown 97–83 before losing to Tennessee in the second round. Armon Bassett of Ohio was named the tournament MVP.

== Format ==
Each of the 12 men's basketball teams in the MAC receives a berth in the conference tournament. Teams are seeded by conference record with the following tie-breakers:

- Head-to-head competition
- Winning percentage vs. ranked conference teams (top to bottom, regardless of division, vs. common opponents regardless of the number of times played)
- Coin flip

The top four seeds received byes into the quarterfinals. The winners of each division were awarded the #1 and #2 seeds. The team with the best record of the two received the #1 seed. First round games were played on campus sites at the higher seed. The remaining rounds were held at Quicken Loans Arena.

== Bracket ==
2009–10 Mid-American Conference men's basketball standings
	Conf.				Overall
Team	W		L	PCT	W		L	PCT
East
Kent State	13	–	3	.813	24	–	10	.706
Akron	12	–	4	.750	24	–	11	.686
Miami	9	–	7	.563	14	–	18	.438
Buffalo	9	–	7	.563	18	–	12	.600
Ohio†	7	–	9	.438	22	–	15	.595
Bowling Green	6	–	10	.375	14	–	16	.467
West
Central Michigan	9	–	7	.563	15	–	15	.500
Eastern Michigan	8	–	8	.500	17	–	15	.531
Western Michigan	8	–	8	.500	18	–	15	.545
Ball State	8	–	8	.500	15	–	15	.500
Northern Illinois	6	–	10	.375	10	–	20	.333
Toledo	1	–	15	.063	4	–	28	.125
† Conference tournament winner Rankings from AP Poll

First round Sunday, March 7
8	Ball State	77
9	Ohio	85*
5	Buffalo	72
12	Toledo	54
7	Western Michigan	75
10	Bowling Green	73
6	Eastern Michigan	65
11	Northern Illinois	59

Quarterfinals; Thursday, March 11
1	Kent State	64
9	Ohio	81
4	Miami	73
5	Buffalo	59
2	Central Michigan	60
7	Western Michigan	69
3	Akron	97**
6	Eastern Michigan	89

Semifinals; Friday, March 12
9	Ohio	54
4	Miami	42
7	Western Michigan	64
3	Akron	66

Final; Saturday, March 13
9	Ohio	81*
3	Akron	75

* Overtime

=== Tiebreakers ===
Seed	Team	Record	Tiebreaker #1	Tiebreaker #2	Tiebreaker #3
1	Kent State	13–3	–	–	–
2	Central Michigan	9–7	Division champ	–	–
3	Akron	12–4	–	–	–
4	Miami	9–7	1–1 head-to-head	1–1 vs. #1 KSU	1–1 vs. #2 Akron
5	Buffalo	9–7	1–1 head-to-head	1–1 vs. #1 KSU	0–2 vs. #2 Akron
6	Eastern Michigan	8–8	3–1 head-to-head	–	–
7	Western Michigan	8–8	2–2 head-to-head	–	–
8	Ball State	8–8	1–3 head-to-head	–	–
9	Ohio	7–9	–	–	–
10	Bowling Green	6–10	1–0 head-to-head	–	–
11	Northern Illinois	6–10	0–1 head-to-head	–	–
12	Toledo	1–15	–	–	–

== All-tournament team ==
- Armon Bassett, Ohio (MVP)
- Jimmy Conyers, Akron
- David Kool, WMU
- Carlos Medlock, EMU
- Chris McKnight, Akron
