= 2009–10 Kent State Golden Flashes men's basketball team =

American college basketball season

2009–10 Kent State Golden Flashes men's basketball

MAC East Division Champions MAC Regular Season Champions

NIT, Second Round
- Conference: Mid-American Conference
- East Division
- Record: 24–10 (13–3 MAC)
- Head coach: Geno Ford (2nd season)
- Associate head coach: Rob Senderoff (2nd season)
- Assistant coaches: Bobby Steinburg; Armon Gates
- Home arena: Memorial Athletic and Convocation Center

2009–10 Mid-American Conference men's basketball standings
	Conf.				Overall
Team	W		L	PCT	W		L	PCT
East
Kent State	13	–	3	.813	24	–	10	.706
Akron	12	–	4	.750	24	–	11	.686
Miami	9	–	7	.563	14	–	18	.438
Buffalo	9	–	7	.563	18	–	12	.600
Ohio†	7	–	9	.438	22	–	15	.595
Bowling Green	6	–	10	.375	14	–	16	.467
West
Central Michigan	9	–	7	.563	15	–	15	.500
Eastern Michigan	8	–	8	.500	17	–	15	.531
Western Michigan	8	–	8	.500	18	–	15	.545
Ball State	8	–	8	.500	15	–	15	.500
Northern Illinois	6	–	10	.375	10	–	20	.333
Toledo	1	–	15	.063	4	–	28	.125
† Conference tournament winner Rankings from AP Poll

The 2009–10 Kent State Golden Flashes men's basketball team represented Kent State University in the 2009–10 college basketball season. The team was coached by Geno Ford and played their home games in the Memorial Athletic and Convocation Center. They are members of the Mid-American Conference. They finished the season 24–10, 13–3 in MAC play to win the east division and overall regular season championship. As the 1 seed they were upset by 9 seed and eventual champion Ohio in the quarterfinals of the 2010 MAC men's basketball tournament. As regular season champions they received an automatic bid to the 2010 National Invitation Tournament where they advanced to the second round before falling to Illinois.

== Before the season ==
=== Roster changes ===
The Golden Flashes lost four seniors from their 2008–09 roster. These seniors include the starters Al Fisher, Jordan Mincy, and Julian Sullinger. Fisher was the team's leading scorer, averaging 14.4 points per game. The team also lost Rashad Woods, who was suspended last year due to a violation of team rules.

To compensate for the team's losses, four new players joined the Flashes for the 2009–10 basketball season. Only one of these four players is a freshman, while one sophomore and two juniors are recruits from junior colleges.

=== Recruiting ===
College recruiting information
Name	Hometown	School	Height	Weight	Commit date
Greg Avila; PF	Bronx, NY	Harcum College	6 ft 6 in (1.98 m)	235 lb (107 kg)	Sep 8, 2008
Greg Avila; PF	Recruit ratings: Scout: Rivals:				
Randal Holt; PG	Bedford, OH	Glenville HS	6 ft 1 in (1.85 m)	180 lb (82 kg)	Sep 13, 2008
Randal Holt; PG	Recruit ratings: Scout: Rivals: (85)				
Justin Manns; C	Winston-Salem, NC	Owens CC	6 ft 11 in (2.11 m)	215 lb (98 kg)	Apr 15, 2009
Justin Manns; C	Recruit ratings: Rivals:				
Ian Pinckney; SG	Chicago, IL	Motlow CC	6 ft 3 in (1.91 m)	195 lb (88 kg)	May 7, 2009
Ian Pinckney; SG	Recruit ratings: Rivals:				
Overall recruit ranking:
Note: In many cases, Scout, Rivals, 247Sports, On3, and ESPN may conflict in their listings of height and weight.; In these cases, the average was taken. ESPN grades are on a 100-point scale.; Sources: "Kent State Commit List for 2009". Rivals.; "Scout.com: Men's Basketball Recruiting". Scout.; "Scout.com Team Recruiting Rankings". Scout.; "2009 Team Ranking". Rivals.

== Roster ==
Roster current as of June 25, when their summer prospectus was published.

Name	Number	Position	Height	Weight	Year	Hometown
Tyree Evans	0	G	6–3	210	Senior	Richmond, Virginia
Chris Singletary	2	G	6–4	220	Senior	Chicago, Illinois
Cameron Joyce	13	G	5–8	160	Freshman	Akron, Ohio
Anthony Simpson	21	F	6–8	215	Senior	Rockford, Illinois
Mike McKee	22	G	6–5	190	Senior	Plum Borough, Pennsylvania
Frank Henry-Ala	30	F	6–5	210	Senior	Pasadena, California
Rodriquez Sherman	32	G	6–2	185	Junior	Indianapolis, Indiana
Justin Greene	33	F	6–8	230	Sophomore	Brooklyn, New York
Alex Grimsley	42	F	6–7	220	Sophomore	Batesville, Indiana
Brandon Parks	55	C	6–10	270	Senior	Bunker Hill, Indiana
Greg Avila		F	6-6	235	Junior	Bronx, New York
Just Manns		C	6–11	215	Junior	Winston-Salem, North Carolina
Ian Pinckney		G	6–3	195	Sophomore	Chicago, Illinois
Randal Holt		G	6–1	180	Freshman	Bedford, Ohio

== Coaching staff ==
Name	Position	College	Graduating year
Geno Ford	Head coach	Ohio University	1997
Rob Senderoff	Associate Coach	University at Albany	1995
Bobby Steinburg	Assistant coach	Middle Tennessee State University	1997
Armon Gates	Assistant coach	Kent State University	2007
Jaden Uken	Director of Basketball Operations	University of Nebraska–Lincoln	2003
Brian Edelstein	Graduate Assistant	Cal Poly	2009

== Schedule ==
Date time, TV	Rank^{#}	Opponent^{#}	Result	Record	Site (attendance) city, state
Exhibition
November 2*; 7:00 p.m.		Ohio Northern	W 75–66; Stats		Memorial Athletic and Convocation Center (1,267); Kent, Ohio
November 7*; 7:00 p.m.		at Wooster	W 76–59; Stats		Timken Gymnasium (1,825); Wooster, Ohio
Regular Season
November 13*; 7:00 p.m.		Samford; Hispanic College Fund Classic	W 69–66; Stats	1–0	Memorial Athletic and Convocation Center (3,618); Kent, Ohio
November 14*; TBA		UAB; Hispanic College Fund Classic	W 72–65; Stats	2–0	Memorial Athletic and Convocation Center (2,632); Kent, Ohio
November 15*; TBA		Green Bay; Hispanic College Fund Classic	L 86–87 ^{OT} Stats	2–1	Memorial Athletic and Convocation Center (2,571); Kent, Ohio
November 18*; TBA		Youngstown State	W 70–61; Stats	3–1	Beeghly Center (4,112); Youngstown, Ohio
November 22*; 7:00 p.m.		Rochester (MI); Hispanic College Fund Classic	W 63–44; Stats	4–1	Memorial Athletic and Convocation Center (2,433); Kent, Ohio
November 25*; 7:00 p.m.		at South Florida	L 54–76; Stats	4–2	USF Sun Dome (4,189); Tampa, Florida
November 29*; 7:00 p.m.		at Morehead State	W 63–57; Stats	5–2	Ellis Johnson Arena (2,201); Morehead, Kentucky
December 4*; 7:30 p.m.		at Xavier	L 61–77; Stats	5–3	Cintas Center (9,896); Cincinnati, Ohio
December 12*; 2:00 p.m.		at Pittsburgh	L 59–71; Stats	5–4	Petersen Events Center (9,468); Pittsburgh, Pennsylvania
December 20*; 7:30 p.m.		Texas A&M–Corpus Christi	W 85–76; Stats	6–4	Memorial Athletic and Convocation Center (3,254); Kent, Ohio
December 22*; 7:05 p.m.		at Robert Morris	W 71–57; Stats	7–4	Charles L. Sewall Center (643); Moon Township, Pennsylvania
December 29*; 11:00 p.m.		vs. Wofford; Cable Car Classic	W 73–66; Stats	8–4	Leavey Center (NA); Santa Clara, California
December 30*; 11:00 p.m.		vs. Northeastern; Cable Car Classic	L 58–61; Stats	8–5	Leavey Center (NA); Santa Clara, California
January 4*; 7:00 p.m.		Norfolk State	W 84–66; Stats	9–5	Memorial Athletic and Convocation Center (1,675); Kent, Ohio
January 9; 2:00 p.m.		at Ohio	W 62–60; Stats	10–5 (1–0)	Convocation Center (8,359); Athens, Ohio
January 12; 7:00 p.m.		at Miami (OH)	L 53–55 ^{OT} Stats	10–6 (1–1)	Millett Hall (1,299); Oxford, Ohio
January 17; 2:00 p.m.		Bowling Green	L 70–76; Stats	10–7 (1–2)	Memorial Athletic and Convocation Center (3,658); Kent, Ohio
January 20; 7:00 p.m.		Buffalo	W 89–54; Stats	11–7 (2–2)	Memorial Athletic and Convocation Center (2,918); Kent, Ohio
January 23; 12:00 p.m., ESPNU		Akron	W 87–70; Stats	12–7 (3–2)	Memorial Athletic and Convocation Center (6,204); Kent, Ohio
January 26; 7:00 p.m.		at Toledo	W 69–49; Stats	13–7 (4–2)	Savage Arena (4,358); Toledo, Ohio
January 30; 2:00 p.m.		Western Michigan	W 74–73; Stats	14–7 (5–2)	Memorial Athletic and Convocation Center (3,961); Kent, Ohio
February 1; 7:00 p.m.		Northern Illinois	W 76–46; Stats	15–7 (6–2)	Memorial Athletic and Convocation Center (3,030); Kent, Ohio
February 4; 7:00 p.m.		at Eastern Michigan	W 75–68; Stats	16–7 (7–2)	Convocation Center (874); Ypsilanti, Michigan
February 6; 7:00 p.m.		at Central Michigan	W 68–63; Stats	17–7 (8–2)	Daniel P. Rose Center (3,142); Mount Pleasant, Michigan
February 10; 7:00 p.m.		Ball State	W 76–42; Stats	18–7 (9–2)	Memorial Athletic and Convocation Center (2,825); Kent, Ohio
February 13; 12:00 p.m., ESPNU		at Buffalo	L 55–70; Stats	18–8 (9–3)	Alumni Arena (2,201); Buffalo, New York
February 17; 7:00 p.m.		Ohio	W 74–67; Stats	19–8 (10–3)	Memorial Athletic and Convocation Center (3,763); Kent, Ohio
February 20*; 8:00 p.m., ESPNU		Western Carolina; ESPN BracketBusters	W 74–72; Stats	20–8 (10–3)	Memorial Athletic and Convocation Center (5,003); Kent, Ohio
February 24; 7:00 p.m.		at Bowling Green	W 75–69; Stats	21–8 (11–3)	Anderson Arena (1,630); Bowling Green, Ohio
February 27; 7:00 p.m.		Miami (OH)	W 66–58; Stats	22–8 (12–3)	Memorial Athletic and Convocation Center (5,781); Kent, Ohio
March 5; 8:00 p.m., ESPN2		at Akron	W 74–61; Stats	23–8 (13–3)	James A. Rhodes Arena (5,545); Akron, Ohio
2010 MAC men's basketball tournament
March 11; 7:00 p.m.		vs. Ohio	L 64–81; Stats	23–9	Quicken Loans Arena (NA); Cleveland, Ohio
2010 National Invitation Tournament
March 17*; 7:00 p.m.		Tulsa	W 75–74	24–9	Memorial Athletic and Convocation Center (1,175); Kent, Ohio
March 22*; 7:00 p.m., ESPNU		at Illinois	L 58–75	24–10	Assembly Hall (10,032); Champaign, Illinois
*Non-conference game. ^{#}Rankings from AP Poll. (#) Tournament seedings in parentheses.

== After the season ==
=== Awards ===
On March 8, 2010, head coach Geno Ford was named the Mid-American Conference Coach of the Year, the seventh time a KSU coach has won the award (Jim McDonald, 1990; Gary Waters, 1999 and 2000; Stan Heath, 2002; and Jim Christian, 2006 and 2008). He was selected by three votes over Keith Dambrot of Akron.
