= 2009–10 Bowling Green Falcons men's basketball team =

American college basketball season

2009–10 Bowling Green Falcons men's basketball
- Conference: Mid-American Conference
- East Division
- Record: 14–12 (6–7 MAC)
- Head coach: Louis Orr
- Assistant coaches: LaMonta Stone; Louis Twigg; Dennis Hopson
- Home arena: Anderson Arena

2009–10 Mid-American Conference men's basketball standings
	Conf.				Overall
Team	W		L	PCT	W		L	PCT
East
Kent State	13	–	3	.813	24	–	10	.706
Akron	12	–	4	.750	24	–	11	.686
Miami	9	–	7	.563	14	–	18	.438
Buffalo	9	–	7	.563	18	–	12	.600
Ohio†	7	–	9	.438	22	–	15	.595
Bowling Green	6	–	10	.375	14	–	16	.467
West
Central Michigan	9	–	7	.563	15	–	15	.500
Eastern Michigan	8	–	8	.500	17	–	15	.531
Western Michigan	8	–	8	.500	18	–	15	.545
Ball State	8	–	8	.500	15	–	15	.500
Northern Illinois	6	–	10	.375	10	–	20	.333
Toledo	1	–	15	.063	4	–	28	.125
† Conference tournament winner Rankings from AP Poll

The 2009–10 Bowling Green Falcons men's basketball team represented Bowling Green State University in the college basketball season of 2009–10. The team was coached by Louis Orr and played their homes game in Anderson Arena. The Falcons were defeated in the first round of the MAC tournament by Western Michigan.

== Coaching staff ==
Name	Position	College	Graduating year
Louis Orr	Head coach	Syracuse University	1980
LaMonta Stone	Assistant coach	Wayne State University	1999
Louis Twigg	Assistant coach	Temple University	2002
Dennis Hopson	Assistant coach	Ohio State University	1987
Megan Centers	Director of Basketball Operations		

== Preseason ==
=== Roster changes ===
Only two starters return from last year's team. Both senior Otis Polk and junior Joe Jakubowski started all 33 games from Bowling Green's previous season. Along with these two players, the Falcons also return sophomores Dee Brown and Scott Thomas as well as senior Erik Marschall, all who started at least 30 games in the season. Bowling Green also added seven new players to their roster. Out of those players, one (Darion Goins) is a transfer from San José State.

=== Recruiting ===
College recruiting information
Name	Hometown	School	Height	Weight	Commit date
Jordon Crawford; PF	Cincinnati, OH	LaSalle HS	5 ft 6 in (1.68 m)	143 lb (65 kg)	
Jordon Crawford; PF	Recruit ratings: (78)				
James Erger; SG	Princeton, TX	Princeton HS	6 ft 6 in (1.98 m)	185 lb (84 kg)	Aug 26, 2009
James Erger; SG	Recruit ratings: Rivals:				
DaVon Haynes; SF	Detroit, MI	Finney HS	6 ft 7 in (2.01 m)	195 lb (88 kg)	
DaVon Haynes; SF	Recruit ratings: (82)				
Luke Kraus; PG	Findlay, OH	Findlay HS	6 ft 2 in (1.88 m)	185 lb (84 kg)	Aug 5, 2008
Luke Kraus; PG	Recruit ratings: Rivals: (84)				
Danny McElroy; PF	Cincinnati, OH	LaSalle HS	6 ft 7 in (2.01 m)	210 lb (95 kg)	Sep 10, 2008
Danny McElroy; PF	Recruit ratings: Scout: Rivals: (75)				
Overall recruit ranking:
Note: In many cases, Scout, Rivals, 247Sports, On3, and ESPN may conflict in their listings of height and weight.; In these cases, the average was taken. ESPN grades are on a 100-point scale.; Sources: "Bowling Green Commit List for 2009". Rivals.; "Scout.com: Men's Basketball Recruiting". Scout.; "Bowling Green Basketball Recruiting 2009". ESPN.; "Scout.com Team Recruiting Rankings". Scout.; "2009 Team Ranking". Rivals.

== Roster ==
Name	Number	Position	Height	Weight	Year	Hometown
Jordon Crawford	1	G	5–6	143	Freshman	Cincinnati, Ohio
Luke Kraus	3	G	6–2	187	Freshman	Findlay, Ohio
Darion Goins	4	G	6–3	204	Junior	Cincinnati, Ohio
DaVon Haynes	5	F	6–7	210	Freshman	Detroit, Michigan
Scott Thomas	10	F	6-6	183	Sophomore	Delaware, Ohio
James Erger	12	G	6-6	185	Freshman	McKinney, Texas
Joe Jakubowski	14	G	6–2	191	Junior	Rossford, Ohio
A'uston calhoun	15	F	6–7	218	Freshman	Southfield, Michigan
Dee Brown	22	G	6–2	200	Sophomore	Detroit, Michigan
Matt Karaffa	32	G	6–3	204	Senior	West Chester, Ohio
Danny McElroy	33	F	6–8	198	Freshman	Cincinnati, Ohio
Erik Marschall	33	F	6–8	198	Freshman	New London, Ohio
Otis Polk	45	C	6–9	285	Senior	Detroit, Michigan
Marc Larson	50	C	6–9	236	Senior	Mattawan, Michigan

== Schedule ==
Date time, TV	Rank^{#}	Opponent^{#}	Result	Record	Site (attendance) city, state
November 14*; 1:00 p.m.		Wayne State	W 67–45; Stats	1–0	Anderson Arena (1,448); Bowling Green, Ohio
November 17*; 7:30 p.m.		Xavier	L 57–101; Stats	1–1	Cintas Center (10,067); Cincinnati, Ohio
November 20*; 9:05 p.m.		at Iowa	L 46–68; Stats	1–2	Carver-Hawkeye Arena (9,010); Iowa City, Iowa
November 28*; 2:00 p.m.		UW–Milwaukee	L 83–90; Stats	1–3	Anderson Arena (1,321); Bowling Green, Ohio
November 30*; 7:00 p.m.		Florida International	W 67–62; Stats	2–3	Anderson Arena (1,915); Bowling Green, Ohio
December 3*; 7:00 p.m.		Savannah State	W 59–51; Stats	3–3	Anderson Arena (1,424); Bowling Green, Ohio
December 5*; 7:00 p.m.		at Fordham	W 67–46; Stats	4–3	Rose Hill Gymnasium (1,324); Bronx, New York
December 12*; 7:00 p.m.		at Canisius	W 58–54; Stats	5–3	Koessler Athletic Center (1,228); Buffalo, New York
December 19*; 3:30 p.m.		at Detroit	L 69–73; Stats	5–4	Calihan Hall (2,468); Detroit, Michigan
December 28*; 7:00 p.m.		at No. 18 Temple	L 39–69	5–5	Liacouras Center (3,900); Philadelphia, Pennsylvania
December 30*; 7:00 p.m.		at Towson	W 70–69	6–5	Towson Center (1,417); Towson, Maryland
January 2*; 7:00 p.m.		Saint Louis	W 59–50	7–5	Anderson Arena (1,518); Bowling Green, Ohio
January 9; 7:00 p.m.		at Akron	L 45–71	7–6 (0–1)	James A. Rhodes Arena (3,028); Akron, Ohio
January 14; 7:00 p.m.		Buffalo	L 65–68	7–7 (0–2)	Anderson Arena (1,804); Bowling Green, Ohio
January 17; 2:00 p.m.		at Kent State	W 76–70	8–7 (1–2)	Memorial Athletic and Convocation Center (3,658); Kent, Ohio
January 20; 7:00 p.m.		Ohio	W 65–57	9–7 (2–2)	Anderson Arena (1,585); Bowling Green, Ohio
January 23; 3:00 p.m.		at Miami (OH)	L 52–64	9–8 (2–3)	Millett Hall (2,213); Oxford, Ohio
January 27; 7:00 p.m.		at Eastern Michigan	W 64–61	10–8 (3–3)	Convocation Center (1,182); Ypsilanti, Michigan
January 30; 7:00 p.m.		Central Michigan	L 52–64	10–9 (3–4)	Anderson Arena (2,222); Bowling Green, Ohio
February 1; 7:00 p.m.		Toledo	W 58–47	11–9 (4–4)	Anderson Arena (2,042); Bowling Green, Ohio
February 4; 7:00 p.m.		at Ball State	L 59–64	11–10 (4–5)	John E. Worthen Arena (2,958); Muncie, Indiana
February 6; 2:00 p.m.		at Western Michigan	L 64–65	11–11 (4–6)	University Arena (3,515); Kalamazoo, Michigan
February 10; 7:00 p.m.		Northern Illinois	W 73–69	12–11 (5–6)	Anderson Arena (1,347); Bowling Green, Ohio
February 14; 2:00 p.m.		Miami (OH)	W 67–64	13–11 (6–6)	Anderson Arena (1,867); Bowling Green, Ohio
February 17; 7:00 p.m.		at Buffalo	L 51–64	13–12 (6–7)	Alumni Arena (1,521); Buffalo, New York
February 20*; 2:00 pm.m		Valparaiso	W 87–70	14–12	Anderson Arena (1,872); Bowling Green, Ohio
February 24; 7:00 p.m.		Kent State	L 75–69	14–13	Anderson Arena (1,630); Bowling Green, Ohio
February 27; 2:30 p.m.		Akron	L 74–68	14–14	Anderson Arena (1,927); Bowling Green, Ohio
March 4; 7:00 p.m.		at Ohio			Convocation Center; Athens, Ohio
*Non-Conference Game. ^{#}Rankings from AP Poll. All times are in Eastern Time Zone.
