= 2009–10 Central Michigan Chippewas men's basketball team =

American college basketball season

2009–10 Central Michigan Chippewas men's basketball
- Conference: Mid-American Conference
- West Division
- Record: 15–15 (9–7 MAC)
- Head coach: Ernie Zeigler
- Assistant coaches: Keith Noftz; Darren Kohne; Terrance Chatman
- Home arena: Rose Arena

2009–10 Mid-American Conference men's basketball standings
	Conf.				Overall
Team	W		L	PCT	W		L	PCT
East
Kent State	13	–	3	.813	24	–	10	.706
Akron	12	–	4	.750	24	–	11	.686
Miami	9	–	7	.563	14	–	18	.438
Buffalo	9	–	7	.563	18	–	12	.600
Ohio†	7	–	9	.438	22	–	15	.595
Bowling Green	6	–	10	.375	14	–	16	.467
West
Central Michigan	9	–	7	.563	15	–	15	.500
Eastern Michigan	8	–	8	.500	17	–	15	.531
Western Michigan	8	–	8	.500	18	–	15	.545
Ball State	8	–	8	.500	15	–	15	.500
Northern Illinois	6	–	10	.375	10	–	20	.333
Toledo	1	–	15	.063	4	–	28	.125
† Conference tournament winner Rankings from AP Poll

The 2009–10 Central Michigan Chippewas basketball team represented Central Michigan University in the college basketball season of 2009–10. The team was coached by Ernie Zeigler and played their homes game in Rose Arena.

== Before the season ==
=== Roster Changes ===
The Chippewas lost two starters from their 2008–09 season. Marcus Van, who last year led the team with 13.0 points per game and 8.3 rebounds per game, graduated. The other starter, Jacolby Hardiman was convicted of a high-court misdemeanor and later transferred to Robert Morris University. Hardiman was responsible for 9.7 points and 4.9 rebounds per game. The Chippewas also lost six other starters, which included one senior, two sophomores, and three freshmen. To replace them, the Chippewas are adding five players to their roster. Two of those are true freshman while the other three are transfers from junior colleges.

=== Recruiting ===
College recruiting information
Name	Hometown	School	Height	Weight	Commit date
Tyler Brown; SF	Eau Claire, WI	Eau Claire North HS	6 ft 7 in (2.01 m)	220 lb (100 kg)	Sep 16, 2008
Tyler Brown; SF	Recruit ratings: Scout: (85)				
Finis Craddock; PG	Garland, TX	Garland HS	6 ft 0 in (1.83 m)	180 lb (82 kg)	Apr 21, 2009
Finis Craddock; PG	Recruit ratings: Scout: Rivals: (80)				
William McClure; PF	Mattoon, IL	Lake Land College	6 ft 7 in (2.01 m)	225 lb (102 kg)	Apr 19, 2009
William McClure; PF	Recruit ratings: Scout:				
Amir Rashid; PG	Athens, TX	Trinity Valley CC	5 ft 9 in (1.75 m)	165 lb (75 kg)	Apr 21, 2009
Amir Rashid; PG	Recruit ratings: Scout:				
Jalin Thomas; SF	Lithopolis, OH	Pensacola JC	6 ft 4 in (1.93 m)	200 lb (91 kg)	
Jalin Thomas; SF	Recruit ratings: No ratings found				
Overall recruit ranking:
Note: In many cases, Scout, Rivals, 247Sports, On3, and ESPN may conflict in their listings of height and weight.; In these cases, the average was taken. ESPN grades are on a 100-point scale.; Sources: "Central Michigan Commit List for 2009". Rivals.; "Scout.com: Men's Basketball Recruiting". Scout.; "Central Michigan Basketball Recruiting 2009". ESPN.; "Scout.com Team Recruiting Rankings". Scout.; "2009 Team Ranking". Rivals.

== Roster ==
Roster current as of September 15, when their summer prospectus was published.

Name	Number	Position	Height	Weight	Year	Hometown
Jordan Bitzer	15	G	6-3	195	Senior	Unionville, Michigan
Tyler Brown	33	F	6-7	220	Freshman	Eau Claire, Wisconsin
Finis Craddock	5	G	6-1	180	Freshman	Garland, Texas
Brandon Ford	13	F/C	6-11	255	Senior	Petrolia, Ontario
Robbie Harman	20	G	6-1	180	Senior	Traverse City, Michigan
Chris Kellermann	21	F	6-8	245	Senior	O'Fallon, Illinois
William McClure	41	F/C	6-7	240	Junior	Indianapolis, Indiana
Amir Rashid	2	G	5-9	165	Junior	Houston, Texas
Zach Saylor	00	F	6-8	235	Freshman	Lansing, Michigan
Marko Špica	10	F/C	6-9	250	Junior	Belgrade, Serbia
Jalin Thomas	31	G/F	6-4	200	Junior	Columbus, Ohio
Antonio Weary	24	G	6-3	215	Junior	Los Angeles, California

== Coaching staff ==
Name	Position	College	Graduating year
Ernie Zeigler	Head coach	Cleary College	1994
Keith Noftz	Assistant coach	Heidelberg University	1978
Darren Kohne	Assistant coach	University of Toledo	2000
Terrance Chatman	Assistant coach	University of Missouri – Kansas City	2001
Marcelo Olivarez	Director of Basketball Operations	Central Michigan University	2009

== Schedule ==
Date time, TV	Rank^{#}	Opponent^{#}	Result	Record	Site (attendance) city, state
November 1*; 4:30 p.m.		Marygrove; Exhibition	W 85–38; Stats		Daniel P. Rose Center (1,065); Mount Pleasant, Michigan
November 7*; 12:00 p.m.		Indiana-South Bend; Exhibition	W 70–42; Stats		Daniel P. Rose Center (291); Mount Pleasant, Michigan
November 14*; 12:00 p.m.		Princeton	L 68–71; Stats	0–1	Daniel P. Rose Center (707); Mount Pleasant, Michigan
November 16*; 7:00 p.m.		Ferris State	W 82–69; Stats	1–1	Daniel P. Rose Center (1,705); Mount Pleasant, Michigan
November 18*; 7:00 p.m.		UIC	W 67-48; Stats	2-1	Daniel P. Rose Center ( 1,170); Mount Pleasant, Michigan
November 21*; 7:00 p.m.		at Fairleigh Dickinson	W 62–53; Stats	2–2	Rothman Center; Teaneck, New Jersey
November 24*; 7:00 p.m.		at Wright State	W 69–53; Stats	2–3	Nutter Center (5,588); Dayton, Ohio
November 28*; 11:30 a.m., Big Ten Network	No. 6	at Purdue	L 38–64; Stats	2–4	Mackey Arena (12,002); West Lafayette, Indiana
December 1*; 7:00 p.m.		Chicago State	W 78–40; Stats	3–4	Daniel P. Rose Center (1,059); Mount Pleasant, Michigan
December 5*; 7:00 p.m.		at Illinois State	L 62–75; Stats	3–5	Redbird Arena (7,060); Normal, Illinois
December 13*; 2:00 p.m.		at South Florida	W 59–56; Stats	4–5	USF Sun Dome (3,364); Tampa, Florida
December 19*; 8:00 p.m.		at South Dakota State	L 72–80; Stats	4–6	Frost Arena (1,302); Brookings, South Dakota
December 22*; 7:00 p.m.		at Detroit	L 58–76; Stats	4–7	Calihan Hall (2,388); Detroit, Michigan
December 30*; 8:00 p.m.		at Alcorn State	W 68–64	5–7	Davey Whitney Complex (500); Lorman, Mississippi
January 9; 2:30 p.m.		at Toledo	W 59–48	6–7 (1–0)	Savage Arena (5,199); Toledo, Ohio
January 13; 7:00 p.m.		Ball State	W 53–38	7–7 (2–0)	Daniel P. Rose Center (2,112); Mount Pleasant, Michigan
January 16; 2:00 p.m.		at Western Michigan	L 61–70	7–8 (2–1)	University Arena (4,656); Kalamazoo, Michigan
January 20; 7:00 p.m.		Eastern Michigan	W 71–63	8–8 (3–1)	Daniel P. Rose Center (1,207); Mount Pleasant, Michigan
January 23; 6:30 p.m.		Northern Illinois	W 81–75	9–8 (4–1)	Daniel P. Rose Center (2,317); Mount Pleasant, Michigan
January 28; 7:00 p.m.		at Miami (OH)	L 51–64	9–9 (4–2)	Millett Hall (1,407); Oxford, Ohio
January 30; 7:00 p.m.		at Bowling Green	W 64–52	10–9 (5–2)	Anderson Arena (2,222); Bowling Green, Ohio
February 4; 7:00 p.m.		Buffalo	W 88–82	11–9 (6–2)	Daniel P. Rose Center (1,029); Mount Pleasant, Michigan
February 6; 7:00 p.m.		Kent State	L 63–68	11–10 (6–3)	Daniel P. Rose Center (3,142); Mount Pleasant, Michigan
February 9; 7:00 p.m.		Akron	L 52–56	11–11 (6–4)	Daniel P. Rose Center (760); Mount Pleasant, Michigan
February 11; 7:00 p.m.		at Ohio	L 76–89	11–12 (6–5)	Convocation Center (4,051); Athens, Ohio
February 14; 4:30 p.m.		Toledo	W 63–46	12–12 (7–5)	Daniel P. Rose Center (2,074); Mount Pleasant, Michigan
February 17; 7:00 p.m.		at Ball State	L 63–69	12–13 (7–6)	John E. Worthen Arena (3,505); Muncie, Indiana
February 20*; 6:30 p.m.		Tennessee State	W 79–73	13–13 (7–6)	Daniel P. Rose Center (2,556); Mount Pleasant, Michigan
February 24; 8:00 p.m.		at Northern Illinois	L 65–67	13–14 (7–7)	Convocation Center (925); DeKalb, Illinois
February 27; 7:00 p.m., Fox Sports Detroit		Western Michigan	W 74–66	14–14 (8–7)	Daniel P. Rose Center (3,504); Mount Pleasant, Michigan
March 4; 6:30 p.m., Fox Sports Detroit		at Eastern Michigan	W 56–55	15–14 (9–7)	Convocation Center (2,148); Ypsilanti, Michigan
March 11; 12 p.m., Fox Sports Detroit		vs. Western Michigan; MAC Tournament quarterfinals	L 60–69	15–15 (9–7)	Quicken Loans Arena (N/A); Cleveland, Ohio
*Non-Conference Game. ^{#}Rankings from AP Poll. All times are in Eastern Time Zone.
