= 2009–10 Eastern Michigan Eagles men's basketball team =

American college basketball season

2009–10 Eastern Michigan Eagles men's basketball
- Conference: Mid-American Conference
- West Division
- Record: 14–13 (6–7 MAC)
- Head coach: Charles Ramsey
- Assistant coaches: Derrick McDowell; Carl Thomas; Andrew Moore
- Home arena: Convocation Center

2009–10 Mid-American Conference men's basketball standings
	Conf.				Overall
Team	W		L	PCT	W		L	PCT
East
Kent State	13	–	3	.813	24	–	10	.706
Akron	12	–	4	.750	24	–	11	.686
Miami	9	–	7	.563	14	–	18	.438
Buffalo	9	–	7	.563	18	–	12	.600
Ohio†	7	–	9	.438	22	–	15	.595
Bowling Green	6	–	10	.375	14	–	16	.467
West
Central Michigan	9	–	7	.563	15	–	15	.500
Eastern Michigan	8	–	8	.500	17	–	15	.531
Western Michigan	8	–	8	.500	18	–	15	.545
Ball State	8	–	8	.500	15	–	15	.500
Northern Illinois	6	–	10	.375	10	–	20	.333
Toledo	1	–	15	.063	4	–	28	.125
† Conference tournament winner Rankings from AP Poll

The 2009–10 Eastern Michigan Eagles basketball team represented Eastern Michigan University in the college basketball season of 2009–10. The team was coached by Charles E. Ramsey and played their homes game in Convocation Center.

== Before the season ==
=== Recruiting ===
College recruiting information
Name	Hometown	School	Height	Weight	Commit date
Matt Balkema; C	Warren, MI	Cousino HS	6 ft 10 in (2.08 m)	270 lb (120 kg)	Nov 12, 2008
Matt Balkema; C	Recruit ratings: Scout: Rivals: (82)				
Quiintin Dailey; SF	Las Vegas, NV	Bishop Gorman JC	6 ft 3 in (1.91 m)	175 lb (79 kg)	May 7, 2009
Quiintin Dailey; SF	Recruit ratings: Scout:				
Jamell Harris; PF	Euclid, OH	Euclid HS	6 ft 8 in (2.03 m)	200 lb (91 kg)	Jul 19, 2008
Jamell Harris; PF	Recruit ratings: Scout: Rivals: (82)				
Jay Higgins; SF	Fayetteville, NC	IMG Academy	6 ft 6 in (1.98 m)	195 lb (88 kg)	May 7, 2009
Jay Higgins; SF	Recruit ratings: Scout:				
Overall recruit ranking:
Note: In many cases, Scout, Rivals, 247Sports, On3, and ESPN may conflict in their listings of height and weight.; In these cases, the average was taken. ESPN grades are on a 100-point scale.; Sources: "Eastern Michigan Commit List for 2009". Rivals.; "Scout.com: Men's Basketball Recruiting". Scout.; "Scout.com Team Recruiting Rankings". Scout.; "2009 Team Ranking". Rivals.

== Roster ==
Roster current as of September 22, when their summer prospectus was published.

Name	Number	Position	Height	Weight	Year	Hometown
Matt Balkema	45	C	6-10	270	Freshman	Warren, Michigan
Brandon Bowdry	33	F	6-6	220	Junior	St. Louis, Missouri
Will Cooper	15	W	6-6	180	Junior	Detroit, Michigan
Quiintin Dailey	21	G	6-3	173	Sophomore	Las Vegas, Nevada
Justin Dobbins	25	F	6-8	245	Senior	Cleveland, Ohio
Jake Fosdick	5	G	6-2	170	Freshman	Saline, Michigan
L.J. Frazier	12	G	5-10	160	Sophomore	Ypsilanti, Michigan
Antonio Green	13	G	6-3	190	Sophomore	Inkster, Michigan
Jamell Harris	32	F	6-8	200	Freshman	Euclid, Ohio
Branden Harrison	10	F	6-7	170	Sophomore	Houston, Texas
Jay Higgins	1	F	6-6	195	Junior	Fayetteville, North Carolina
Kamil Janton	51	C	6-10	230	Sophomore	Tarnów, Poland
Carlos Medlock	3	G	6-0	186	Senior	Detroit, Michigan
J.R. Sims	2	G	6-3	180	Freshman	Fort Wayne, Indiana

== Coaching staff ==
Name	Position	College	Graduating year
Charles Ramsey	Head coach	Eastern Michigan University	1992
Derrick McDowell	Associate Coach	Stetson University	1983
Carl Thomas	Assistant coach	Eastern Michigan University	2000
Andrew Moore	Assistant coach	Muskingum University	1992
Chris Highfield	Director of Basketball Operations	Michigan University	2000
Travis Lewis	Graduate Manager	Eastern Michigan University	2007

== Schedule ==
Date time, TV	Rank^{#}	Opponent^{#}	Result	Record	Site (attendance) city, state
November 7*; 4:30 p.m.		Concordia; Exhibition	W 90–47; Stats		Convocation Center; Ypsilanti, Michigan
Regular season
November 14*; 7:00 p.m.		at Oakland	W 81–77	1–0	Athletics Center O'rena (3,115); Rochester, Michigan
November 20*; TBA		vs. The Citadel; Hispanic College Fund Classic	L 56–63; Stats	1–1	JQH Arena (5,134); Springfield, Missouri
November 21*; TBA		vs. Maryland Eastern Shore; Hispanic College Fund Classic	W 76–51; Stats	2–1	JQH Arena (5,234); Springfield, Missouri
November 22*; TBA		vs. Missouri State; Hispanic College Fund Classic	L 61–75	2–2	JQH Arena (4,491); Springfield, Missouri
November 24*; 7:00 p.m.		at Southeast Missouri State	W 86–76; Stats	3–2	Show Me Center (1,317); Cape Girardeau, Missouri
November 28*; 2:00 p.m.		Davenport	W 76–66; Stats	4–2	Convocation Center (434); Ypsilanti, Michigan
November 30*; TBA		Canisius	W 75–58; Stats	5–2	Convocation Center (423); Ypsilanti, Michigan
December 5*; 12:00 p.m.		at No. 15 Ohio State	L 60–111; Stats	5–3	Jerome Schottenstein Center (12,135); Columbus, Ohio
December 12*; 7:00 p.m.		James Madison	W 75–64; Stats	6–3	Convocation Center (1,072); Ypsilanti, Michigan
December 19*; 4:00 p.m.		at Georgia State	L 65–66; Stats	6–4	GSU Sports Arena (1,405); Atlanta, Georgia
December 22*; 7:00 p.m.		Samford	L 56–58; Stats	6–5	Convocation Center (670); Ypsilanti, Michigan
December 30*; 7:00 p.m.		Northwood	W 72–58	7–5	Convocation Center (713); Ypsilanti, Michigan
January 3*; 2:00 p.m.		Chicago State	W 59–47	8–5	Convocation Center (396); Ypsilanti, Michigan
January 9; 4:00 p.m.		at Western Michigan	L 47–61	8–6 (0–1)	University Arena (3,224); Kalamazoo, Michigan
January 13; 7:00 p.m.		Toledo	W 74–59	9–6 (1–1)	Convocation Center (1,182); Ypsilanti, Michigan
January 16; 2:00 p.m.		at Northern Illinois	L 69–77	9–7 (1–2)	Convocation Center (2,003); DeKalb, Illinois
January 20; 7:00 p.m.		at Central Michigan	L 63–71	9–8 (1–3)	Daniel P. Rose Center (1,207); Mount Pleasant, Michigan
January 23; 2:00 p.m., Ball State Sports Network		Ball State	W 57–53	10–8 (2–3)	Convocation Center (1,380); Ypsilanti, Michigan
January 27; 7:00 p.m.		Bowling Green	L 61–64	10–9 (2–4)	Convocation Center (1,182); Ypsilanti, Michigan
January 30; 12:00 p.m., ESPNU		at Miami (OH)	L 51–61	10–10 (2–5)	Millett Hall (1,759); Oxford, Ohio
February 1; 7:00 p.m., FS Ohio & FS Detroit		at Akron	W 62–59	11–10 (3–5)	James A. Rhodes Arena (2,674); Akron, Ohio
February 4; 7:00 p.m.		Kent State	L 68–75	11–11 (3–6)	Convocation Center (874); Ypsilanti, Michigan
February 6; 4:30 p.m.		Ohio	W 70–61	12–11 (4–6)	Convocation Center (1,362); Ypsilanti, Michigan
February 10; 7:00 p.m.		at Buffalo	L 67–84	12–12 (4–7)	Alumni Arena (945); Buffalo, New York
February 14; 2:00 p.m., FS Detroit		Western Michigan	W 66–52	13–12 (5–7)	Convocation Center (1,094); Ypsilanti, Michigan
February 17; 7:00 p.m.		at Toledo	W 58–42	14–12 (6–7)	Savage Arena (3,558); Toledo, Ohio
February 20*; 3:35 p.m.		at Detroit	L 66–68	14–13 (6–7)	Calihan Hall (3,020); Detroit, Michigan
February 24; 7:00 p.m.		at Ball State; Ball State Senior Night	W 72–67	15–13 (7–7)	John E. Worthen Arena (3,313); Muncie, Indiana
February 27; 2:00 p.m.		Northern Illinois; E-Club Athletic Hall of Fame Game	W 66–60	16–13 (8–7)	Convocation Center (1,499); Ypsilanti, Michigan
March 4; 6:30 p.m., FS Detroit		Central Michigan; Senior Day	L 55–56	16–14 (8–8)	Convocation Center (2,148); Ypsilanti, Michigan
MAC tournament
March 7		Northern Illinois	W 65–59	17–14 (8–8)	Convocation Center (675); Ypsilanti, Michigan
March 11		at Akron	L 89–97 ^{2OT}	17–15 (8–8)	Quicken Loans Arena (3,084); Cleveland, Ohio
*Non-Conference Game. ^{#}Rankings from AP Poll. All times are in Eastern Time Zone.

== Season Highlights ==
=== 11/14 at Oakland ===
- EMU's first-ever victory over Oakland in Rochester, Michigan.

=== 03/11 vs Akron ===
- Carlos Medlock scored 42 points, second best all time in the MAC tournament.
- Carlos Medlock's 26 field goals attempted is good enough for second best all time in the MAC tournament behind former EMU player Fred Cofield.
- Carlos Medlock's 14 3-point goals attempted is good enough for second best all time in the MAC tournament.

Carlos Medlock drafted by NBADL in 6th round by the Utah Flash.

=== Awards ===
==== 2nd Team All-MAC ====
- Carlos Medlock
- Brandon Bowdry

==== MAC Honorable Mention ====
- Justin Dobbins

==== MAC All-Tournament Team ====
- Carlos Medlock

==== MAC Individual Records ====
- Brandon Bowdry- Rebounding (319/10.0)
- Justin Dobbins- Field Goal Percentage (.615)
