= Armon Bassett =

American basketball player

Personal information
- Born: December 28, 1986 (age 39) Terre Haute, Indiana
- Listed height: 6 ft 2 in (1.88 m)
- Listed weight: 180 lb (82 kg)

Career information
- High school: South (Terre Haute, Indiana); Hargrave Military Academy (Chatham, Virginia)
- College: Indiana (2006–2008); Ohio (2009–2010)
- NBA draft: 2010: undrafted
- Playing career: 2010–2011
- Position: Point guard

Career history
- 2010–2011: Ironi Ramat Gan

Career highlights
- MAC tournament MVP (2010)

Armon Bassett (born December 28, 1986) is a former American professional basketball player. Bassett played collegiately at Indiana University prior to transferring to Ohio University, where he led the team to the NCAA tournament.

He was drafted in the 2010 NBA Development League Draft by the Maine Red Claws but cut prior to the season. He played one season professionally with Ironi Ramat Gan of Israel.

== Personal ==
A native of Terre Haute, Indiana, Bassett attended Terre Haute South Vigo High School before attending Hargrave Military Academy for a prep year.

== MAC ==
Bassett led 9th seeded Ohio to win the 2010 MAC men's basketball tournament, of which he was named MVP.
