= Gene Cross =

American basketball coach (born 1971)

Personal information
- Born: December 20, 1971 (age 54) Chicago, Illinois, U.S.

Career information
- High school: Rich Central (Olympia Fields, Illinois)
- College: Illinois (1990–1994)
- Coaching career: 1996–2017

Career history

Coaching
- 1996–2002: UIC (assistant)
- 2002–2005: DePaul (assistant)
- 2005–2006: Virginia (assistant)
- 2006–2008: Notre Dame (assistant)
- 2008–2010: Toledo
- 2010–2011: Utah Flash (assistant)
- 2011–2012: Iowa Energy (assistant)
- 2012–2014: Erie BayHawks
- 2014–2015: Los Angeles D-Fenders (assistant)
- 2015–2016: Reno Bighorns (assistant)
- 2016–2017: Rayos de Hermosillo COY

Gene Cross (born December 20, 1971) is an American former college and professional basketball coach, currently serving as a Director, Scouting & Administration for the New York Knicks of the National Basketball Association (NBA).

== Personal ==
Gene Cross was born in Chicago, Illinois. He starred as a prep basketball player just outside the city, at Rich Central High School in Olympia Fields, Illinois. Cross was named the team's MVP and also earned All-SICA South Conference honors. He was also inducted into the Rich Central High School Hall of Fame in October 2010.

From 1990 to 1994, Cross played college basketball at the University of Illinois under head coach Lou Henson. Cross was a letterman during his junior and senior seasons and helped lead the Illini to the NCAA Tournament in both seasons. He graduated from Illinois with a Bachelor of Arts degree in History and later matriculated from The Ohio State University with a Master of Science degree in Sport Management.

While pursuing his graduate studies, Cross spent a year coaching basketball at Marion-Franklin High School in Columbus, Ohio.

Cross is also a member of the Kappa Alpha Psi fraternity.

== Coaching career ==
In 1996, Cross returned to his hometown when he was hired as assistant coach at the University of Illinois-Chicago. In the 1997–98 season UIC would tie a school record with 22 victories and win a share of the MCC regular-season title while earning an at-large bid to the NCAA tournament. In Cross's final season at UIC, the Flames finished 20–14 winning the Horizon League conference tournament championship. That win propelled UIC into the NCAA Tournament via automatic bid.

Cross then spent 3 seasons from 2002 to 2005 seasons as an assistant coach for the DePaul Blue Demons. DePaul played in the NIT to finish the 2003 and 2005 seasons. The 2003–04, the Blue Demons tied for the C-USA Championship and played in the NCAA tournament. In 2005, Cross was named one of the top 25 recruiters in college basketball by Rivals.com.

Cross followed Dave Leitao to Virginia and became Leitao's top assistant where he helped guide the Cavaliers to an NIT berth.

After one season with Virginia, Cross left to become the assistant coach and recruiting coordinator at Notre Dame under head coach Mike Brey. Notre Dame finished the 2006–07 season with a 24–8 record and an appearance in the NCAA Tournament. In 2007–08, The Irish finished 25–8 and advanced to the second round of the NCAA Tournament. CBSsportsline.com named Cross to the list of "Ten Assistants Ready For the Next Step" in 2007.

On April 11, 2008, Gene Cross was hired as the new head coach of the Toledo Rockets. Cross went 11–53 in 2 years as head coach of the Rockets.

On September 21, 2010, Cross was hired as lead assistant coach for the Utah Flash of the NBA Development League, affiliates of the Atlanta Hawks and the Utah Jazz, under new head coach Kevin Young. The Flash recorded an impressive 28–22 record, qualifying for the playoffs for the third consecutive season. Upon completion of the 2010–11 season the Utah Flash announced its hiatus for the 2011–2012 season.

Cross was hired as the lead assistant coach by the defending NBA Development League champion Iowa Energy and its new head coach Kevin Young with whom Cross worked for the previous season with the Utah Flash. The coaching duo lead the team to a 25–25 record and an NBA D-League playoff appearance. The Energy were affiliated with the Chicago Bulls, New Orleans Hornets, and Washington Wizards It was also during this season that Cross was named assistant coach of the 2012 NBA Development League East All Star team.

Gene Cross was named head coach of the Erie BayHawks, the NBA D-League affiliate of the New York Knicks in September 2012. Cross became the third head coach in BayHawks history taking over for Jay Larranaga who left to become an assistant coach for the Boston Celtics. Cross led the BayHawks to a 26–24 record in his first season, the fourth winning season in the franchise's five seasons in existence while having two players called up to the NBA, Henry Sims and Terell Harris both to the New Orleans Pelicans. Cross finished his second season with a record of 16–34 and one NBA call-up, Jeremy Tyler to the New York Knicks.

After two seasons at the helm in Erie, Cross was hired as an assistant coach for the Los Angeles D-Fenders, the NBA affiliate of the Los Angeles Lakers. The season was highlighted by three players receiving call-ups: Jabari Brown and Vander Blue to the Los Angeles Lakers and Jamaal Franklin to the Denver Nuggets with Brown and Blue both being named NBA D-League All Stars.

On October 9, 2015, Cross was named lead assistant coach of the Reno Bighorns the NBA D-League affiliate of the Sacramento Kings. The Bighorns finished the regular season with the 2nd best record in the league and best record in the Western Conference at (33–17). This regular season success led to a Pacific Division championship and the #1 seed in the Western Conference playoffs.

Cross most recently lead Rayos de Hermosillo of the Mexican CIBACOPA to a 30–8 record and the CIBACOPA Finals where he was also named 2017 CIBACOPA Coach of the Year. After his successful international coaching stint, Cross re-joined the Sacramento Kings in September 2017 as a college scout. In September 2018 Cross was promoted to the role of Director of Amateur Scouting. In December 2020, he left his post with Sacramento to bolster the New York Knicks revamped scouting department.
