= Kenny Hayes =

American basketball player (born 1987)

No. 19 – Al-Ahly
- Position: Point guard

Personal information
- Born: April 16, 1987 (age 39) Dayton, Ohio, U.S.
- Listed height: 6 ft 2 in (1.88 m)
- Listed weight: 175 lb (79 kg)

Career information
- High school: Northmont (Clayton, Ohio)
- College: Cincinnati State CC (2006–2007); Miami (Ohio) (2007–2010)
- NBA draft: 2010: undrafted
- Playing career: 2010–present

Career history
- 2010–2012: Maine Red Claws
- 2012: Trotamundos de Carabobo
- 2012–2013: Hapoel Gilboa Galil
- 2013–2014: Maccabi Ashdod
- 2014–2015: Vanoli Cremona
- 2015–2016: Astana
- 2016: Unicaja Málaga
- 2016–2017: Büyükçekmece Basketbol
- 2017–2018: Limoges CSP
- 2018–2020: Büyükçekmece Basketbol
- 2019: Hebei Xianglan
- 2021: Gaziantep Basketbol
- 2021: Le Mans
- 2021–2022: Pallacanestro Forlì 2.015
- 2022: HDI Sigorta Afyon Belediye
- 2022: Sigortam.net
- 2022–2023: Beirut Club
- 2023–2024: Dijlah University College
- 2024–2025: Ohud Medina (basketball)
- 2025–present: Al Ahly (basketball)

Career highlights
- BSL scoring leader (2019); 2x BSL All-Star (2017, 2019); NBA D-League Most Improved Player (2012); First-team All-MAC (2010)

Kenneth Sherrod Hayes (born April 16, 1987) is an American professional basketball player. He attended and played college basketball for Miami University.

== Professional career ==
Hayes went undrafted in the 2010 NBA draft. On November 1, 2010, he was selected by the Maine Red Claws in the 2010 NBA D-League Draft. On April 18, 2012, he was named the NBA Development League’s Most Improved Player for the 2011–12 season.

On August 5, 2012, he signed with Hapoel Gilboa Galil of Israel for the 2012–13 season. On August 8, 2013, he signed with Maccabi Ashdod for the 2013–14 season.

On July 23, 2014, Hayes signed with Vanoli Cremona of Italy for the 2014–15 season.

On August 3, 2015, Hayes signed with BC Astana of Kazakhstan. On March 7, 2016, he left Astana and signed with Unicaja Málaga of Spain for the rest of the 2015–16 ACB season.

On July 14, 2016, Hayes signed with Turkish club Demir İnşaat Büyükçekmece for the 2016–17 season.

On July 10, 2017, Hayes signed with French club Limoges CSP for the 2017–18 season. Hayes averaged 12.3 points per game on the season. He rejoined Büyükçekmece on July 10, 2018.

On January 15, 2021, he has signed with Gaziantep Basketbol of the Turkish Basketball Super League (BSL).

On August 10, 2021, he has signed with Pallacanestro Forlì 2.015 of the Serie A2 Basket.

On January 19, 2022, he has signed with HDI Sigorta Afyon Belediye of the Basketbol Süper Ligi (BSL).

On July 1, 2022, he has signed with Sigortam.net of the TBL.

In the 2023 Arab Club Basketball Championship, Hayes played for Iraqi club Dijlah University.
