= Syracuse Orange men's basketball statistical leaders =

The Syracuse Orange men's basketball statistical leaders are individual statistical leaders of the Syracuse Orange men's basketball program in various categories, including points, assists, blocks, rebounds, and steals. Within those areas, the lists identify single-game, single-season, and career leaders. The Orange represent the Syracuse University in the NCAA's Atlantic Coast Conference.

Syracuse began competing in intercollegiate basketball in 1900. However, the school's record book does not generally list records from before the 1950s, as records from before this period are often incomplete and inconsistent. Since scoring was much lower in this era, and teams played much fewer games during a typical season, it is likely that few or no players from this era would appear on these lists anyway.

The NCAA did not officially record assists as a stat until the 1983–84 season, and blocks and steals until the 1985–86 season, but Syracuse's record books includes players in these stats before these seasons. These lists are updated through the end of the 2020–21 season.

== Scoring ==
Career
Rk	Player	Points	Seasons
1	Lawrence Moten	2,334	1991–92 1992–93 1993–94 1994–95
2	Derrick Coleman	2,143	1986–87 1987–88 1988–89 1989–90
3	John Wallace	2,119	1992–93 1993–94 1994–95 1995–96
4	Gerry McNamara	2,099	2002–03 2003–04 2004–05 2005–06
5	Hakim Warrick	2,073	2001–02 2002–03 2003–04 2004–05
6	Sherman Douglas	2,060	1985–86 1986–87 1987–88 1988–89
7	Stephen Thompson	1,956	1986–87 1987–88 1988–89 1989–90
8	Preston Shumpert	1,907	1998–99 1999–00 2000–01 2001–02
9	Dave Bing	1,883	1963–64 1964–65 1965–66
10	Rafael Addison	1,876	1982–83 1983–84 1984–85 1985–86

Season
Rk	Player	Points	Season
1	John Wallace	845	1995–96
2	Dave Bing	794	1965–66
3	Carmelo Anthony	778	2002–03
4	Greg Kohls	748	1971–72
5	Preston Shumpert	744	2001–02
	Billy Owens	744	1990–91
7	Hakim Warrick	726	2004–05
8	Tyus Battle	712	2017–18
9	Rudy Hackett	709	1974–75
10	Sherman Douglas	693	1988–89

Single game
Rk	Player	Points	Season	Opponent
1	Bill Smith	47	1970–71	Lafayette
2	Dave Bing	46	1965–66	Vanderbilt
3	Dave Bing	45	1964–65	Colgate
4	John Gillon	43	2016–17	NC State
	Gerry McNamara	43	2003–04	BYU
	Dave Bing	43	1965–66	Buffalo
7	Bill Smith	41	1968–69	Niagara
	Pete Chudy	41	1960–61	Alfred
9	Andrew White III	40	2016–17	Georgia Tech
	Gene Waldron	40	1983–84	Iona
	Frank Reddout	40	1952–53	Canisius
	Ed Miller	40	1951–52	Canisius

== Rebounds ==
Career
Rk	Player	Rebounds	Seasons
1	Derrick Coleman	1,537	1986–87 1987–88 1988–89 1989–90
2	Rony Seikaly	1,094	1984–85 1985–86 1986–87 1987–88
3	John Wallace	1,065	1992–93 1993–94 1994–95 1995–96
4	Hakim Warrick	1,025	2001–02 2002–03 2003–04 2004–05
5	Jon Cincebox	1,004	1956–57 1957–58 1958–59
6	Rudy Hackett	990	1972–73 1973–74 1974–75
7	Roosevelt Bouie	987	1976–77 1977–78 1978–79 1979–80
8	Rick Jackson	930	2007–08 2008–09 2009–10 2010–11
9	Billy Owens	910	1988–89 1989–90 1990–91
10	Bill Smith	903	1968–69 1969–70 1970–71

Season
Rk	Player	Rebounds	Season
1	Derrick Coleman	422	1988–89
2	Rudy Hackett	407	1974–75
3	Derrick Coleman	398	1989–90
4	Derrick Coleman	384	1987–88
5	Bill Smith	378	1970–71
6	Vaughn Harper	373	1966–67
7	Billy Owens	371	1990–91
8	Jon Cincebox	365	1958–59
9	Rick Jackson	360	2010–11
10	Carmelo Anthony	349	2002–03

Single game
Rk	Player	Rebounds	Season	Opponent
1	Frank Reddout	34	1951–52	Temple
2	Dave Bing	25	1965–66	Cornell
3	Eddie Lampkin Jr.	23	2024–25	Pittsburgh
	Derrick Coleman	23	1989–90	Villanova
	Dan Schayes	23	1980–81	Georgetown
	Rudy Hackett	23	1973–74	W. Virginia
	Bill Smith	23	1970–71	W. Virginia
	Vaughn Harper	23	1966–67	Colgate
	Norm Goldsmith	23	1963–64	Colgate
10	Rick Jackson	22	2010–11	Detroit
	Paul Harris	22	2008–09	Connecticut
	Billy Owens	22	1990–91	Villanova
	Rudy Hackett	22	1973–74	La Salle
	Dave Bing	22	1964–65	Penn State

== Assists ==
Career
Rk	Player	Assists	Seasons
1	Sherman Douglas	960	1985–86 1986–87 1987–88 1988–89
2	Jason Hart	709	1996–97 1997–98 1998–99 1999–00
3	Gerry McNamara	648	2002–03 2003–04 2004–05 2005–06
4	Dwayne Washington	637	1983–84 1984–85 1985–86
5	Adrian Autry	631	1990–91 1991–92 1992–93 1993–94
6	Scoop Jardine	619	2007–08 2009–10 2010–11 2011–12
7	Eddie Moss	539	1977–78 1978–79 1979–80 1980–81
8	Jonny Flynn	439	2007–08 2008–09
9	Frank Howard	435	2015–16 2016–17 2017–18 2018–19
10	Lazarus Sims	432	1992–93 1993–94 1994–95 1995–96

Season
Rk	Player	Assists	Season
1	Sherman Douglas	326	1988–89
2	Michael Carter-Williams	292	2012–13
3	Sherman Douglas	289	1986–87
4	Sherman Douglas	288	1987–88
5	Lazarus Sims	281	1995–96
6	Jonny Flynn	254	2008–09
7	Dwayne Washington	250	1985–86
8	Allen Griffin	220	2000–01
9	Jason Hart	208	1999–00
10	Gerry McNamara	207	2005–06

Single game
Rk	Player	Assists	Season	Opponent
1	Sherman Douglas	22	1988–89	Providence
2	Dwayne Washington	18	1983–84	St. John’s
3	Michael Carter-Williams	16	2012–13	Monmouth
4	Michael Carter-Williams	14	2012–13	Seton Hall
	Michael Carter-Williams	14	2012–13	Canisius
	Jason Hart	14	1999–00	Villanova
	Michael Lloyd	14	1994–95	S. Illinois
	Sherman Douglas	14	1988–89	Kentucky
	Sherman Douglas	14	1988–89	Indiana
	Dwayne Washington	14	1985–86	St. John’s
	Eddie Moss	14	1979–80	St. Bonaventure

== Steals ==
Career
Rk	Player	Steals	Seasons
1	Jason Hart	329	1996–97 1997–98 1998–99 1999–00
2	Gerry McNamara	258	2002–03 2003–04 2004–05 2005–06
3	Sherman Douglas	235	1985–86 1986–87 1987–88 1988–89
4	Eddie Moss	230	1977–78 1978–79 1979–80 1980–81
5	Dwayne Washington	220	1983–84 1984–85 1985–86
6	Adrian Autry	217	1990–91 1991–92 1992–93 1993–94
7	Billy Owens	216	1988–89 1989–90 1990–91
8	Lawrence Moten	215	1991–92 1992–93 1993–94 1994–95
9	Trevor Cooney	207	2012–13 2013–14 2014–15 2015–16
	Dale Shackleford	207	1975–76 1976–77 1977–78 1978–79

Season
Rk	Player	Steals	Season
1	Michael Carter-Williams	111	2012–13
2	Jason Hart	101	1998–99
	James Thues	101	2001–02
4	Jason Hart	90	1996–97
5	Eddie Moss	85	1980–81
6	Dwayne Washington	82	1985–86
7	Jason Hart	79	1997–98
8	Billy Owens	78	1990–91
9	Gerry McNamara	77	2002–03
10	Dwayne Washington	76	1983–84

Single game
Rk	Player	Steals	Season	Opponent
1	Todd Burgan	10	1997–98	Colgate
2	DeShaun Williams	9	2001–02	BC
	James Thues	9	2001–02	Rutgers
4	Matt Roe	8	1988–89	St. Francis (PA)
5	Frank Howard	7	2017–18	Maryland
	Andy Rautins	7	2009–10	N. Carolina
	Billy Edelin	7	2004–05	Notre Dame
	Preston Shumpert	7	1999–00	Albany
	Jason Hart	7	1998–99	Boston College
	Jason Hart	7	1998–99	Notre Dame
	Todd Burgan	7	1997–98	NC Asheville
	Jason Hart	7	1996–97	Colgate
	Greg Monroe	7	1984–85	Utica
	Rafael Addison	7	1982–83	Cornell
	Jim Williams	7	1974–75	Louisville

== Blocks ==
Career
Rk	Player	Blocks	Seasons
1	Etan Thomas	424	1996–97 1997–98 1998–99 1999–00
2	Roosevelt Bouie	327	1976–77 1977–78 1978–79 1979–80
3	Derrick Coleman	319	1986–87 1987–88 1988–89 1989–90
	Rony Seikaly	319	1984–85 1985–86 1986–87 1987–88
5	Darryl Watkins	273	2003–04 2004–05 2005–06 2006–07
6	Jeremy McNeil	260	1999–2000 2000–01 2001–02 2002–03 2003–04
7	Rick Jackson	259	2007–08 2008–09 2009–10 2010–11
8	Rakeem Christmas	247	2011–12 2012–13 2013–14 2014–15
9	John Wallace	209	1992–93 1993–94 1994–95 1995–96
10	Craig Forth	205	2001–02 2002–03 2003–04 2004–05

Season
Rk	Player	Blocks	Season
1	Etan Thomas	138	1997–98
2	Etan Thomas	131	1998–99
3	Derrick Coleman	127	1988–89
4	Darryl Watkins	112	2006–07
5	Etan Thomas	107	1999–00
6	Jeremy McNeil	100	2002–03
7	Darryl Watkins	99	2005–06
8	Rony Seikaly	97	1985–86
9	Roosevelt Bouie	91	1976–77
	Paschal Chukwu	91	2017–18

Single game
Rk	Player	Blocks	Season	Opponent
1	Fab Melo	10	2011–12	Seton Hall
2	Etan Thomas	9	1999–00	Pittsburgh
	Etan Thomas	9	1999–00	Florida Atlantic
	Etan Thomas	9	1997–98	Conn.
5	Paschal Chukwu	8	2017–18	Buffalo
	Paschal Chukwu	8	2017–18	Oakland
	Darryl Watkins	8	2006–07	Cincinnati
	Darryl Watkins	8	2005–06	Cornell
	Jeremy McNeil	8	2002–03	Connecticut
	Etan Thomas	8	1997–98	St. John’s
	LeRon Ellis	8	1990–91	Boston College
	Derrick Coleman	8	1988–89	Canisius
	Derrick Coleman	8	1988–89	Kentucky State
	Rony Seikaly	8	1985–86	Boston College
	Dan Schayes	8	1980–81	Seton Hall
	Roosevelt Bouie	8	1978–79	Iona
	Roosevelt Bouie	8	1977–78	W. Kentucky
	Roosevelt Bouie	8	1977–78	Buffalo
	Roosevelt Bouie	8	1977–78	Colgate
