= 2009–10 Syracuse Orange men's basketball team =

American college basketball season

2009–10 Syracuse Orange men's basketball

Big East Regular Season Champions Coaches vs. Cancer Classic Champions

NCAA tournament, Sweet Sixteen
- Conference: Big East Conference (1979–2013)

Ranking
- Coaches: No. 8
- AP: No. 4
- Record: 30–5 (15–3 Big East)
- Head coach: Jim Boeheim
- Assistant coaches: Bernie Fine; Mike Hopkins; Rob Murphy
- Home arena: Carrier Dome

2009–10 Big East men's basketball standings
	Conf.				Overall
Team	W		L	PCT	W		L	PCT
No. 4 Syracuse	15	–	3	.833	30	–	5	.857
No. 6 West Virginia †	13	–	5	.722	31	–	7	.816
No. 9 Villanova	13	–	5	.722	25	–	8	.758
No. 18 Pittsburgh	13	–	5	.722	25	–	9	.735
Marquette	11	–	7	.611	22	–	12	.647
Louisville	11	–	7	.611	20	–	13	.606
No. 14 Georgetown	10	–	8	.556	23	–	11	.676
Notre Dame	10	–	8	.556	23	–	12	.657
South Florida	9	–	9	.500	20	–	13	.606
Seton Hall	9	–	9	.500	19	–	13	.594
Cincinnati	7	–	11	.389	19	–	16	.543
Connecticut	7	–	11	.389	18	–	16	.529
St. John's	6	–	12	.333	17	–	16	.515
Rutgers	5	–	13	.278	15	–	17	.469
Providence	4	–	14	.222	12	–	19	.387
DePaul	1	–	17	.056	8	–	23	.258
† 2010 Big East tournament winner As of April 3, 2010; Rankings from AP Poll

The 2009–10 Syracuse Orange men's basketball team represented Syracuse University in the 2009–10 NCAA Division I men's basketball season. Their head coach was Jim Boeheim, serving for his 34th year. The team played its home games at the Carrier Dome in Syracuse, New York. Key contributors included seniors Arinze Onuaku and Andy Rautins, juniors Rick Jackson and Wesley Johnson, sophomores Scoop Jardine and Kris Joseph and freshmen Mookie Jones, DaShonte Riley, James Southerland and Brandon Triche.

Although widely expected to finish near the middle of the league, the Orange captured its eighth Big East regular season title, and second outright, as well as the No. 1 seed in the Big East tournament. The team also achieved its first No. 1 ranking in the national AP Poll since the 1989-90 season, and its first in the ESPN/USA Today coaches' poll since winning the national championship in 2003.

The Orange failed to win the Big East tournament, falling in the quarterfinals to Georgetown, but their regular season efforts earned them a 1 seed in the West Region of the 2010 NCAA Division I men's basketball tournament. They easily won their first and second-round games over 16 seed Vermont and 8 seed Gonzaga to advance to the Sweet Sixteen where they were upset by 5 seed and AP #11 Butler to end the season 30–5.

== Preseason ==
=== Roster changes ===
Syracuse lost its starting backcourt from the previous season as point guard Jonny Flynn declared for the 2009 NBA draft and was taken with the sixth overall pick by the Minnesota Timberwolves. Also turning pro were shooting guard Eric Devendorf and small forward Paul Harris. The Orange also lost one scholarship senior, power forward Kristof Ongenaet and one transfer, center Sean Williams.

Additions to the team include Iowa State transfer Wes Johnson, who sat out the 2008–09 season because of NCAA transfer rules. Also, point guard Scoop Jardine returns after redshirting due to a stress fracture in his shin. Small forward Mookie Jones also redshirted the previous year because of a hip injury.

Syracuse also brought in three new players for 2009-10: power forward DaShonte Riley, small forward James Southerland and guard Brandon Triche. Southerland was actually a 2008 recruit, but could not play because he was academically ineligible. He spent a year at a prep school to improve his grades.

=== Recruiting ===
College recruiting
Name	Hometown	School	Height	Weight	Commit date
DaShonte Riley; Forward	Detroit, MI	Detroit Country Day School	6 ft 11 in (2.11 m)	200 lb (91 kg)	Mar 3, 2009
DaShonte Riley; Forward	Recruit ratings: Scout: Rivals: (92)				
Brandon Triche; Guard	DeWitt, NY	Jamesville-DeWitt High School	6 ft 4 in (1.93 m)	210 lb (95 kg)	Sep 17, 2008
Brandon Triche; Guard	Recruit ratings: Scout: Rivals: (90)				
Overall recruit ranking:
Note: In many cases, Scout, Rivals, 247Sports, On3, and ESPN may conflict in their listings of height and weight.; In these cases, the average was taken. ESPN grades are on a 100-point scale.; Sources: "Syracuse 2009 Basketball Commitments". Rivals.; "2009 Syracuse Basketball Commits". Scout.; "ESPN". ESPN.; "Scout.com Team Recruiting Rankings". Scout.; "2009 Team Ranking". Rivals.

== Roster ==
2010–11 Syracuse Orange men's basketball team
Players
Coaches

Pos.	#	Name	Height	Weight	Year	Previous school	Hometown
F	0	Rick Jackson	6 ft 9 in (2.06 m)	240 lb (109 kg)	Jr	Neumann-Goretti	Philadelphia, Pennsylvania
G	2	Nick Resavy	6 ft 2 in (1.88 m)	201 lb (91 kg)	So	West Milford	West Milford, New Jersey
G	11	Scoop Jardine	6 ft 2 in (1.88 m)	190 lb (86 kg)	Jr	Neumann-Goretti	Philadelphia, Pennsylvania
G	13	Griffin Hoffmann	6 ft 0 in (1.83 m)	178 lb (81 kg)	Fr	York Preparatory	New York, New York
F	14	Matt Lyde-Cajuste	6 ft 5 in (1.96 m)	215 lb (98 kg)	Fr	Iona Preparatory	Mt. Vernon, New York
G	20	Brandon Triche	6 ft 4 in (1.93 m)	210 lb (95 kg)	Fr	Jamesville-DeWitt	Jamesville, New York
F	21	Mookie Jones	6 ft 6 in (1.98 m)	220 lb (100 kg)	So	Peekskill	Peekskill, New York
G	24	Brandon Reese	5 ft 11 in (1.8 m)	160 lb (73 kg)	So	Pine Crest	Davie, Florida
F	32	Kris Joseph	6 ft 7 in (2.01 m)	210 lb (95 kg)	So	Archbishop Carroll (D.C.)	Montreal, Quebec
C	10	DaShonte Riley	7 ft 0 in (2.13 m)	240 lb (109 kg)	Fr	Detroit Country Day	Detroit, Michigan
F	43	James Southerland	6 ft 8 in (2.03 m)	215 lb (98 kg)	Fr	Notre Dame Preparatory (Massachusetts)	Bayside, New York
F	4	Wesley Johnson	6 ft 7 in (2.01 m)	205 lb (93 kg)	Jr	Corsicana	Corsicana, Texas
C	21	Arinze Onuaku	6 ft 9 in (2.06 m)	261 lb (118 kg)	Sr	Episcopal	Lanham, Maryland
G	1	Andy Rautins	6 ft 5 in (1.96 m)	195 lb (88 kg)	Sr	Jamesville-DeWitt	Jamesville, New York

Head coach

- Jim Boeheim, 34th yr. (Syracuse, 1966)

Assistant coach(es)

- Mike Hopkins, 14th yr. (Syracuse, 1993)
- Rob Murphy, 6th yr. (Central State, 1996)
- Gerry McNamara, 1st yr. (Syracuse, 2007)

Strength and conditioning coach(es)

- Lazarus Sims, 3rd yr. (Syracuse, 1996)

Legend

- (C) Team captain
- (S) Suspended
- (I) Ineligible
- (W) Walk-on
- Injured
- Current redshirt

Roster
Last update: February 6, 2019

=== Preseason outlook ===
The departure of Flynn left many college basketball observers pessimistic about the Orange. In the preseason coaches' poll, Syracuse was predicted to finish sixth in the Big East and were unranked in the preseason AP Poll. Arinze Onuaku was the only Orange player to make the preseason All-Big East team, receiving an honorable mention.

== Season ==
=== Notable games ===
- On November 4, Syracuse was stunned by Division II Le Moyne, 82–79, in its final exhibition game before opening the regular season. The loss was Syracuse's first exhibition loss in six years.
- On November 20, then-No. 24 Syracuse upset then-No. 4 North Carolina 87–71 in the finals of the Coaches Vs. Cancer Classic at Madison Square Garden. Wesley Johnson scored 25 points and collected eight rebounds, and Syracuse used a 22–1 run to open the second half.
- On December 10, then-No. 7 Syracuse knocked off then-No. 10 Florida in a match up of unbeaten teams. Rick Jackson scored a career-high 19 points and grabbed 11 rebounds, Andy Rautins had 18 points and Wes Johnson finished with 17 points and 10 rebounds.
- On January 2, then-No. 5 Syracuse was handed its first loss of the season as it was upset by then-unranked Pittsburgh 82–72. Pitt's Ashton Gibbs scored 24 points and Jermaine Dixon added 21. The Orange was led by Wesley Johnson's 19 points.
- On January 26, Jim Boeheim extended his NCAA Division-I record for most 20-win seasons to 32, when then-No. 4 Syracuse rallied from a 14-0 starting deficit to defeat then-No. 7 Georgetown 73–56. The Orange's Kris Joseph came off the bench to score 15 points, and Wesley Johnson added 14 points and 4 blocks, taking advantage of the Hoyas' 19 turnovers and 20 personal fouls.
- On February 27, the Orange clinched its eighth Big East regular season title and a No. 1 seed in the Big East tournament by beating No. 8 Villanova, 95–77. The game also set the NCAA on-campus basketball attendance record, with 34,616 spectators present. Three days later they won the title outright, with a win against St. John's, 85–66.

=== Other news ===
- On March 1, two days after beating Villanova, Syracuse achieved its first No. 1 ranking in the AP Poll since the 1989–90 season, and its first in the ESPN/USA Today coaches' poll since winning the national championship in 2003.

== Schedule ==
Date time, TV	Rank^{#}	Opponent^{#}	Result	Record	Site (attendance) city, state
Exhibition
October 25*; 2:00 p.m., Time Warner Cable SportsNet		Cal State LA (D II)	W 97–54		Carrier Dome (5,523); Syracuse, NY
November 3*; 7:00 p.m., Time Warner Cable SportsNet		Le Moyne (D II)	L 79–82		Carrier Dome (N/A); Syracuse, NY
Regular season
November 9*; 9:00 p.m., ESPNU		Albany; 2K Sports Coaches vs. Cancer Classic	W 75–43	1–0	Carrier Dome (15,707); Syracuse, NY
November 11*; 7:00 p.m., ESPNU		Robert Morris; 2K Sports Coaches vs. Cancer Classic	W 100–60	2–0	Carrier Dome (15,594); Syracuse, NY
November 19*; 7:00 p.m., ESPN2		vs. No. 13 California; 2K Sports Coaches vs. Cancer Classic	W 95–73	3–0	Madison Square Garden (N/A); New York, NY
November 20*; 7:30 p.m., ESPN2		vs. No. 6 North Carolina; 2K Sports Coaches vs. Cancer Classic	W 87–71	4–0	Madison Square Garden (15,552); New York, NY
November 24*; 7:00 p.m., ESPN360	No. 10	Cornell	W 88–73	5–0	Carrier Dome (18,238); Syracuse, NY
November 27*; 7:00 p.m., Time Warner Cable SportsNet	No. 10	Columbia	W 85–60	6–0	Carrier Dome (20,166); Syracuse, NY
November 30*; 7:00 p.m., ESPN 360	No. 8	Colgate	W 92–58	7–0	Carrier Dome (18,457); Syracuse, NY
December 5*; 7:00 p.m., Time Warner Cable SportsNet	No. 8	Maine	W 101–55	8–0	Carrier Dome (20,302); Syracuse, NY
December 10*; 9:00 p.m., ESPN	No. 7	vs. No. 10 Florida; SEC/Big East Invitational	W 85–73	9–0	St. Pete Times Forum (9,353); Tampa, FL
December 13*; 1:00 p.m., Time Warner Cable SportsNet	No. 7	St. Francis (NY)	W 75–51	10–0	Carrier Dome (19,381); Syracuse, NY
December 19*; 7:00 p.m., Time Warner Cable SportsNet	No. 5	St. Bonaventure	W 85–72	11–0	Carrier Dome (20,578); Syracuse, NY
December 22*; 7:00 p.m., Time Warner Cable SportsNet	No. 5	Oakland	W 92–60	12–0	Carrier Dome (18,669); Syracuse, NY
December 29; 9:00 p.m., Big East Network	No. 5	at Seton Hall	W 80–73	13–0 (1–0)	Prudential Center (9,800); Newark, NJ
January 2; 12:00 p.m., Big East Network	No. 5	Pittsburgh	L 72–82	13–1 (1–1)	Carrier Dome (24,969); Syracuse, NY
January 6*; 7:00 p.m., ESPN2	No. 7	Memphis	W 74–57	14–1	Carrier Dome (17,805); Syracuse, NY
January 10; 2:00 p.m., Big East Network	No. 7	South Florida	W 82–65	15–1 (2–1)	Carrier Dome (18,703); Syracuse, NY
January 13; 7:30 p.m., Big East Network	No. 5	at Rutgers	W 81–65	16–1 (3–1)	Louis Brown Athletic Center (8,085); Piscataway, NJ
January 16; 12:00 p.m., ESPN	No. 5	at No. 10 West Virginia	W 72–71	17–1 (4–1)	WVU Coliseum (15,271); Morgantown, WV
January 18; 7:00 p.m., ESPN	No. 5	at Notre Dame	W 84–71	18–1 (5–1)	Joyce Center (9,149); South Bend, IN
January 23; 2:00 p.m., ESPNU	No. 5	Marquette	W 76–71	19–1 (6–1)	Carrier Dome (29,011); Syracuse, NY
January 25; 7:00 p.m., ESPN	No. 4	No. 7 Georgetown; Rivalry	W 73–56	20–1 (7–1)	Carrier Dome (26,508); Syracuse, NY
January 30; 2:00 p.m., Big East Network/SNY	No. 4	at DePaul	W 59–57	21–1 (8–1)	Allstate Arena (11,554); Rosemont, IL
February 2; 7:00 p.m., Big East Network/SNY	No. 3	Providence	W 85–68	22–1 (9–1)	Carrier Dome (20,205); Syracuse, NY
February 7; 2:00 p.m., Big East Network/SNY	No. 3	at Cincinnati	W 71–54	23–1 (10–1)	Fifth Third Arena (11,045); Cincinnati, OH
February 10; 7:00 p.m., ESPN	No. 2	Connecticut; Rivalry	W 72–67	24–1 (11–1)	Carrier Dome (24,847); Syracuse, NY
February 14; 1:00 p.m., ESPN	No. 2	Louisville	L 60–66	24–2 (11–2)	Carrier Dome (31,053); Syracuse, NY
February 18; 7:00 p.m., ESPN2	No. 5	at No. 10 Georgetown; Rivalry	W 75–71	25–2 (12–2)	Verizon Center (19,976); Washington, DC
February 23; 7:00 p.m., ESPNU	No. 4	at Providence	W 99–85	26–2 (13–2)	Dunkin' Donuts Center (12,410); Providence, RI
February 27; 9:00 p.m., ESPN	No. 4	No. 8 Villanova; ESPN College GameDay	W 95–77	27–2 (14–2)	Carrier Dome (34,616‡); Syracuse, NY
March 2; 7:00 p.m., Big East Network/SNY	No. 1	St. John's	W 85–66	28–2 (15–2)	Carrier Dome (26,081); Syracuse, NY
March 6; 2:00 p.m., ESPN	No. 1	at Louisville; Freedom Hall Finale	L 68–78	28–3 (15–3)	Freedom Hall (20,135); Louisville, KY
Big East tournament
March 11; 12:00 p.m., ESPN	(1) No. 3	vs. (8) No. 22 Georgetown; Quarterfinal/Rivalry	L 84–91	28–4	Madison Square Garden (19,375); New York, NY
NCAA tournament†
March 19; 9:30 p.m., CBS	(1 W) No. 4	vs. (16 W) Vermont; First Round	W 79–56	29–4	HSBC Arena (18,948); Buffalo, NY
March 21; 12:10 p.m., CBS	(1 W) No. 4	vs. (8 W) No. 22 Gonzaga; Second Round	W 87–65	30–4	HSBC Arena (18,934); Buffalo, NY
March 25; 7:07 p.m., CBS	(1 W) No. 4	vs. (5 W) No. 11 Butler; Sweet Sixteen	L 59–63	30–5	EnergySolutions Arena (17,254); Salt Lake City, UT
*Non-conference game. ^{#}Rankings from AP poll. ‡Largest on-campus attendance in NCAA basketball history. †NCAA Tournament ranks are seeds in the region (E=East, M=Midwest, S=South, W=West). (#) Tournament seedings in parentheses. All times are in Eastern Time.

== Rankings ==
Ranking movement Legend: ██ Increase in ranking. ██ Decrease in ranking. NA = Ranking not available.
Poll	Pre	Wk 1	Wk 2	Wk 3	Wk 4	Wk 5	Wk 6	Wk 7	Wk 8	Wk 9	Wk 10	Wk 11	Wk 12	Wk 13	Wk 14	Wk 15	Wk 16	WK 17	Wk 18	Final
AP	RV	RV	10	8	7	5	5	5	7	5	5	4	3	2	5	4	1	3	4	NA
Coaches	25	24	9	7	6	5	5	5	7	5	5	4	4	3	5	4	1	3	4	8
ESPN Power Ranking	NA	RV	NA	NA	NA	NA	NA	NA	NA	6	5	5	2	2	2	4	3	1	NA	NA

== 2010 signing class ==
College recruiting
Name	Hometown	School	Height	Weight	Commit date
Fabricio de Melo; C	Brazil	The Sagemont School	7 ft 0 in (2.13 m)	270 lb (120 kg)	Aug 3, 2009
Fabricio de Melo; C	Recruit ratings: Scout: Rivals: (96)				
C. J. Fair; SF	Baltimore, MD	Brewster Academy	6 ft 7 in (2.01 m)	200 lb (91 kg)	Oct 19, 2008
C. J. Fair; SF	Recruit ratings: Scout: Rivals: (94)				
Baye Moussa Keita; C	Saint-Louis, Senegal	Oak Hill Academy	6 ft 11 in (2.11 m)	220 lb (100 kg)	Oct 21, 2008
Baye Moussa Keita; C	Recruit ratings: Scout: Rivals: (91)				
Dion Waiters; SG	Philadelphia, PA	Life Center Academy	6 ft 4 in (1.93 m)	210 lb (95 kg)	Jul 11, 2007
Dion Waiters; SG	Recruit ratings: Scout: Rivals: (96)				
Overall recruit ranking: Scout: #4 Rivals: #5 ESPN: #4
Note: In many cases, Scout, Rivals, 247Sports, On3, and ESPN may conflict in their listings of height and weight.; In these cases, the average was taken. ESPN grades are on a 100-point scale.; Sources: "2010 Syracuse Signees". Rivals.; "2010 Syracuse Signees". Scout.; "2010 Syracuse Signees". ESPN.; "Scout.com Team Recruiting Rankings". Scout.; "2010 Team Ranking". Rivals.
