= Jeffrey Mark Deskovic =

American man from upstate New York

Jeffrey Mark Deskovic (born October 27, 1973) is an American attorney from Peekskill, New York known for freeing the wrongly convicted. In 1990, at the age of 17, he was convicted of raping, beating, and strangling his Peekskill High School classmate, Angela Correa, who was 15 at the time of the murder.

During a months-long investigation, which included extensive interrogations, he made a false confession that was immediately withdrawn, but became the basis for his conviction. He served 16 years, some in an adult "super max" as a minor, while maintaining his innocence. He requested post-conviction DNA testing, but the DA's office, then headed by Jeanine Pirro, refused to accept his lay request.

In 2006, with support by the Innocence Project, crime scene DNA testing led to Steven Cunningham, who was serving time for subsequent murder committed in the same fashion. Cunningham confessed to having committed the murder.

In 2014, a jury found in favor of Deskovic and awarded him $41.6 million in a federal civil suit against the county for wrongful imprisonment. Due to his pretrial settlement with the county, he was limited to receive $10 million, which he used to establish his foundation.

== Biography ==
Jeffrey Deskovic was born in 1973 in North Tarrytown, in Westchester County. He attended public schools, including Peekskill High School. He was not popular at school.

On November 15, 1989 in Peekskill, New York, Correa disappeared after going out with a portable cassette player and a camera for a project for her photography class. Two days later her body was found, and police determined she had been raped and strangled. Deskovic was among the many students who attended her funeral; he was so distraught that he cried openly during the service.

The police thought Deskovic was showing suspicious behavior as a result of him being upset and took him into custody as a potential suspect. They interrogated him at length. Deskovic later said that, under coercion, he made a false confession, fabricating an account based on crime scene information fed to him by police officers during their leading questions in the course of the interrogation. Deskovic also said: "By the police officer's own testimony, by the end of the interrogation I was on the floor crying uncontrollably in what they described as a fetal position".

Although DNA testing at the time excluded Deskovic from the forensic DNA found in Correa's body, a jury convicted Deskovic on December 7, 1990.

Deskovic continued to proclaim his innocence on numerous occasions after his conviction. The office of Westchester County district attorney (DA) Jeanine Pirro, who took office after he was imprisoned, refused to accept his request to test the DNA against the system's database. From at least 2000, Deskovic appealed to D.A. Pirro to run post-conviction DNA testing, as he believed it would prove his innocence. Pirro declined to run any DNA tests that could help release him from prison. Deskovic's case was taken by the Innocence Project, which provided him with defense counsel. They repeated his attempt to gain DNA testing.

In 2006, the newly elected district attorney, Janet DiFiore, authorized DNA testing of Deskovic. It excluded his DNA from that found at the scene. The DNA from the crime scene was found to match that of Steven Cunningham, a man who was already serving a life term for another murder. Confronted with the DNA evidence, he later confessed and pleaded guilty to the Correa murder.

== Exoneration and release ==
Deskovic's conviction was overturned and he was released from prison in 2006. A subsequent independent review of the case, written by retired judges Leslie Crocker Snyder and Peter J. McQuillan, along with former Staten Island D.A. William L. Murphy; and Richard Joselson of Legal Aid, criticized police and the former prosecutor for failure to pursue other leads and for downplaying the DNA evidence that led to Deskovic's exoneration. According to the report, errors were made throughout the entire case, including tunnel vision by both police and the previous prosecutor, along with reliance on profiling which turned out to be completely incorrect, followed by deliberate downplaying of the DNA evidence that ultimately proved Deskovic was innocent.

== Aftermath ==
Deskovic received a bachelor's degree in behavioral science from Mercy College in 2008 and a master's degree from John Jay College of Criminal Justice in 2013. He has also received a Juris Doctor degree from Pace University.

He is a criminal defense attorney specializing in the freeing and defense of the wrongfully arrested/convicted. He does this through a not-for-profit foundation, for which he is assisted by a combination of volunteers and paid staff. Among Deskovic's advisors are exonerees Oliver Jovanovic and Archie Williams. Non-exonerees include Professors William Hughes and Christopher Pascale.

Deskovic filed a federal civil rights suit against Putnam County and the state for wrongful conviction and imprisonment. In October 2014 a jury found in his favor and awarded him $41.6 million: "$25 million for the time he spent wrongfully imprisoned, $15 million for his suffering, and the rest for lost wages over those years." Based on a pre-trial settlement with the county, intended to limit the potential payout, Deskovic would receive a total of $10 million. The jury’s verdict showed that they believed the county was responsible for the "flawed process that led to Deskovic’s conviction."

In 2019, a documentary film titled Conviction was produced based on Deskovic's life by a Canadian filmmaker Jia Rizvi.

The case was also featured in a two-part dramatic recreation in Justice on Trial (season 1), in episodes 3 and 4."Justice on Trial (TV Series)". IMDb.

== See also ==
- List of wrongful convictions in the United States
