= 2005 NBA Development League draft =

General information
- Sport: Basketball
- Date: November 3, 2005

Overview
- League: NBA
- First selection: Andre Barrett, Florida Flame

The 2005 NBA Development League draft was the fifth annual draft by the NBA Development League. It was held on November 3, 2005.

== Round 1 ==
1. Florida Flame: Andre Barrett
2. Fayetteville Patriots: Nigel Dixon
3. Fort Worth Flyers: Ime Udoka
4. Arkansas Rimrockers: Harvey Thomas
5. Roanoke Dazzle: Will Bynum
6. Albuquerque Thunderbirds: Chuck Hayes
7. Tulsa 66ers: Bernard King
8. Austin Toros: Jamar Smith

== Round 2 ==
1. Florida Flame: Ricky Shields
2. Fayetteville Patriots: Erik Daniels
3. Fort Worth Flyers: Luke Schenscher
4. Arkansas Rimrockers: James Lang
5. Roanoke Dazzle: Jeremy McNeil
6. Albuquerque Thunderbirds: Marcus Taylor
7. Tulsa 66ers: Mustafa Al-Sayaad
8. Austin Toros: Ezra Williams

== Round 3 ==
1. Florida Flame: Kyle Bailey
2. Fayetteville Patriots: Norman Richardson
3. Fort Worth Flyers: Vonteego Cummings
4. Arkansas Rimrockers: Myron Allen
5. Roanoke Dazzle: Andreas Glyniadakis
6. Albuquerque Thunderbirds: Ken Johnson
7. Tulsa 66ers: Desmon Farmer
8. Austin Toros: Jeff Hagen

== Round 4 ==
1. Florida Flame: Jonathan Moore
2. Fayetteville Patriots: Robb Dryden
3. Fort Worth Flyers: Ayudeji Akindele
4. Arkansas Rimrockers: Adam Sonn
5. Roanoke Dazzle: Anthony Grundy
6. Albuquerque Thunderbirds: T. J. Cummings
7. Tulsa 66ers: Otis George
8. Austin Toros: Ryan Forehan-Kelly

== Round 5 ==
1. Florida Flame: George Leach
2. Fayetteville Patriots: Mark Karcher
3. Fort Worth Flyers: Brandon Robinson
4. Arkansas Rimrockers: Ed McCants
5. Roanoke Dazzle: Nick Billings
6. Albuquerque Thunderbirds: Cory Hightower
7. Tulsa 66ers: Seamus Boxley
8. Austin Toros: Neil Fingleton

== Round 6 ==
1. Florida Flame: E.J. Rowland
2. Fayetteville Patriots: Darnell Miller
3. Fort Worth Flyers: Alejandro Carmona
4. Arkansas Rimrockers: Chris Shumate
5. Roanoke Dazzle: Nate Daniels
6. Albuquerque Thunderbirds: Chet Mason
7. Tulsa 66ers: Will Conroy
8. Austin Toros: Marcus Moore

== Round 7 ==
1. Florida Flame: Romel Beck
2. Fayetteville Patriots: Roderick Riley
3. Fort Worth Flyers: Daryl Dorsey
4. Arkansas Rimrockers: Jamario Moon
5. Roanoke Dazzle: Dan Miller
6. Albuquerque Thunderbirds: Josh Moore
7. Tulsa 66ers: Jerry Dupree
8. Austin Toros: Ben Adams

== Round 8 ==
1. Florida Flame: Anwar Ferguson
2. Fayetteville Patriots: Anthony Coleman
3. Fort Worth Flyers: Charles Hanks
4. Arkansas Rimrockers: Brandon Freeman
5. Roanoke Dazzle: Jermaine Bell
6. Albuquerque Thunderbirds: Kevin Frey
7. Tulsa 66ers: Cezary Trybanski
8. Austin Toros: Ray Young

== Round 9 ==
1. Florida Flame: Josh Gross
2. Fayetteville Patriots: Steven Barber
3. Fort Worth Flyers: Paul Pardue
4. Arkansas Rimrockers: Jitim Young
5. Roanoke Dazzle: Drew Woods
6. Albuquerque Thunderbirds: Yuta Tabuse
7. Tulsa 66ers: Paul Marigney
8. Austin Toros: Corey Williams

== Round 10 ==
1. Florida Flame: Torrian Jones
2. Fayetteville Patriots: Carlos Hurt
3. Fort Worth Flyers: Anthony Wilkins
4. Arkansas Rimockers: Leonard Mosely
5. Roanoke Dazzle: Malik Moore
6. Albuquerque Thunderbirds: Greg Jefferson
7. Tulsa 66ers: Rasheim Wright
8. Austin Toros: Anthony Lever-Pedrosa
