= Cezary Trybański =

Polish basketball player (born 1979)

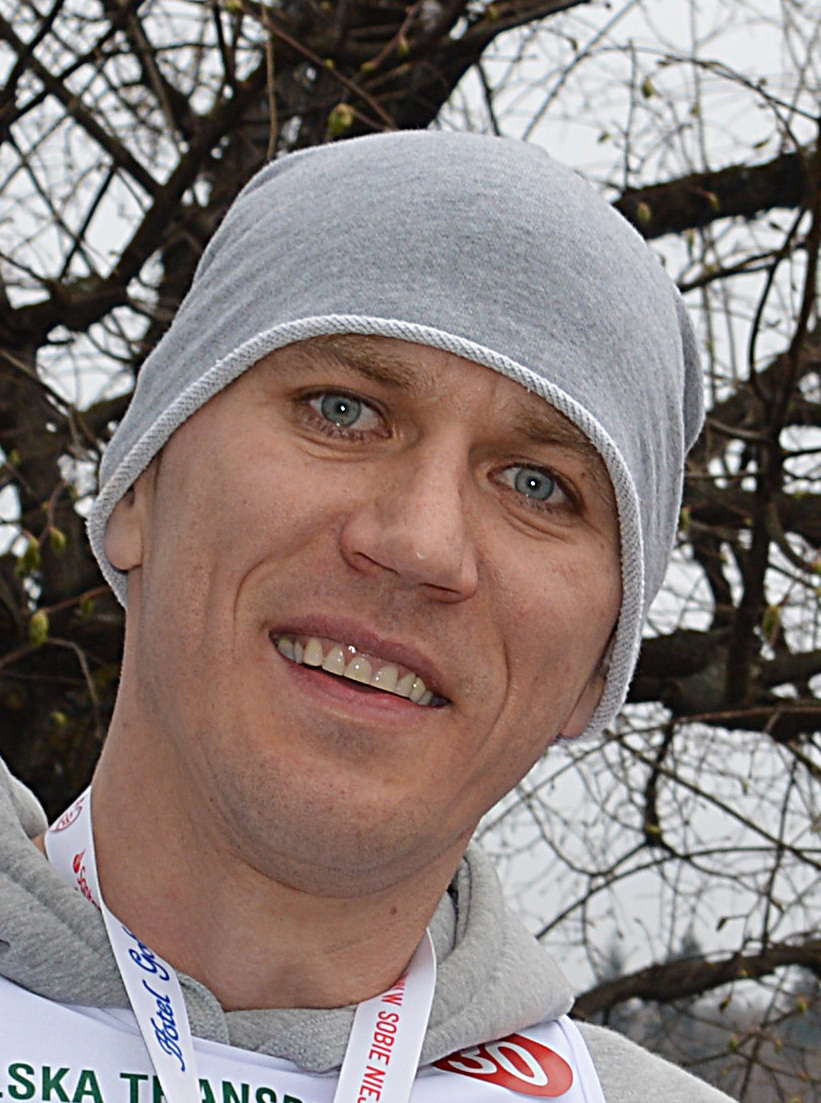

Personal information
- Born: 22 September 1979 (age 47) Warsaw, Poland
- Listed height: 7 ft 2 in (2.18 m)
- Listed weight: 235 lb (107 kg)

Career information
- NBA draft: 2001: undrafted
- Playing career: 1997–2016
- Position: Center
- Number: 15, 5, 14

Career history
- 1997–1998: Legia Warsaw
- 1999–2002: Znicz Pruszków
- 2002–2003: Memphis Grizzlies
- 2003–2004: Phoenix Suns
- 2004: New York Knicks
- 2005–2007: Tulsa 66ers
- 2007–2008: Peristeri
- 2009–2010: Reno Bighorns
- 2010–2011: NH Ostrava
- 2012–2013: Dzūkija
- 2013–2014: Polpharma Starogard Gdański
- 2014: AZS Koszalin
- 2014–2016: Legia Warsaw
- Stats at NBA.com
- Stats at Basketball Reference

Cezary Trybański (born 22 September 1979) is a Polish former professional basketball player. He is a 7'2" 235 lb center. He was the first Polish-born player in the National Basketball Association (NBA).

Born in Warsaw, he is the brother of a Polish triple jumper, Małgorzata Trybańska.

== Early career ==
In Poland, he played for Legia Warszawa in 1997-98 and MKS Pruszkow of PLK league from 1999 to 2002. Previously, he played in Shmoolky, which is, and was in 1990s, one of the best non-professional/amateur clubs in Warsaw.

== NBA career ==
Cezary Trybański signed a 3-year contract worth $4.8 million with the Memphis Grizzlies on July 22, 2002. He became the first Polish-born player to appear in an NBA game on November 15, 2002, in a six-minute debut. He played a total of 22 NBA games with the Memphis Grizzlies, the Phoenix Suns, and the New York Knicks from 2002 to 2004. On August 5, 2004, he was traded to the Chicago Bulls in a six-player trade that sent Jamal Crawford to the New York Knicks. In October 2004, he was waived by the Bulls. In 2005, he was selected 63rd overall in the 2005 NBDL Draft by the Tulsa 66ers. He appeared in 45 games, making 15 starts and put up averages of 3.5 PPG, 3.3 RPG, and nearly 2 blocks in just 16 minutes. In October 2006, he signed a contract with the Toronto Raptors worth about US$600,000. Soon after signing this deal, Trybanski was released. He was then reacquired by the 76ers. He was waived on November 22, 2006, to rehabilitate an injury, and re-signed on December 1, 2006.

Trybański's final NBA game was on March 7, 2004, in a 99–86 win over the Washington Wizards where he only played for 50 seconds, substituting at the very end of the game for Stephon Marbury. In that 50 seconds, Trybański missed his only field-goal attempt but was able to record 1 steal thanks to a bad pass by Wizards' player Steve Blake.

== Life after NBA ==
After coming back to his homeland Cezary Trybański signed with Legia Warszawa, a team located in the capital of Poland, Warsaw.
