= Jia Rizvi =

Canadian filmmaker (born 1986)

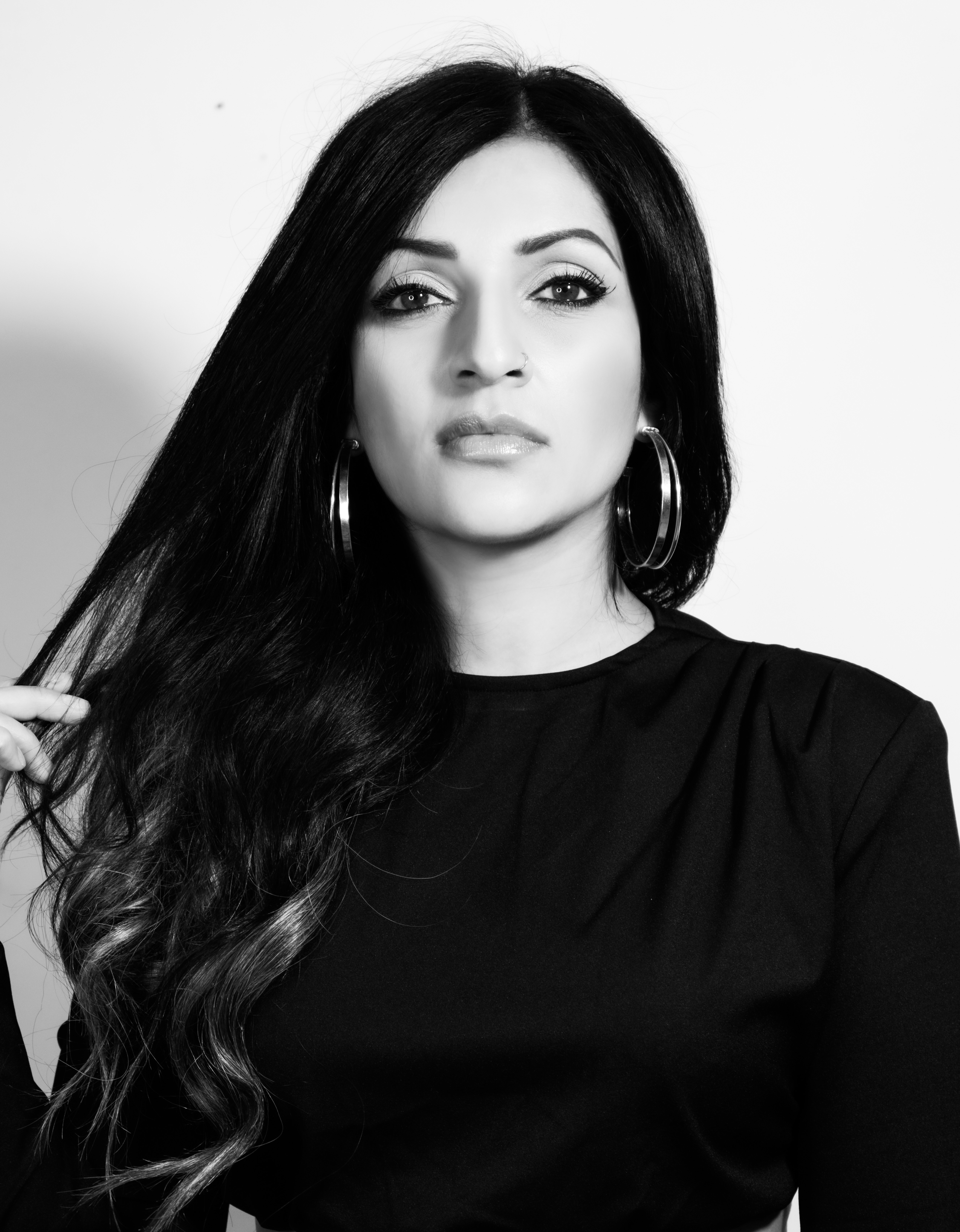
- Rizvi in 2025
- Born: Tripoli, Libya
- Citizenship: Canadian
- Education: George Brown College, fashion design New York film academy, directing
- Known for: Conviction, documentary
- Parents: Aftab Rizvi (father); Shaista Rizvi (mother)
- Website: Official website

Jia Rizvi (also known as Jia Wertz) is a Canadian filmmaker, and Founder and fashion designer of Studio 15. She is known for her debut documentary film, Conviction: a true story based on the life of 16-year-old Jeffrey Deskovic who was wrongly convicted for the rape and murder of Angela Correa, his high school classmate.

Along with John Gully, she co-hosts a true-crime podcast series, Speaking of Crime, investigating mysterious unsolved cases.

Rizvi also serves on the board of Youth Represent, an organization that empowers Black, Latinx, and other marginalized youth impacted by the criminal justice system.

== Early life and education ==
Jia Rizvi was born in Tripoli, Libya, to her father, Aftab Rizvi, and mother, Shaista Rizvi, who are of Indian and Pakistani origin. She has two younger brothers. Later, her family migrated to Calgary, Canada, where she attended Ernest Manning High School. Upon graduating from high school, Rizvi went on to study fashion design at George Brown College in Toronto. Subsequently, she moved to the United States after meeting and marrying her American husband. Rizvi then attended the New York Film Academy to study the art of filmmaking.

== Career ==
=== Fashion Industry ===
Following her graduation from George Brown College, Rizvi joined the fashion industry, where she worked for two decades in Houston, San Francisco and New York. During this time, she founded Studio 15, a retail establishment focused on women's fashion, particularly contemporary dress designs.

=== Filmmaking ===
Rizvi was inspired by Norman Jewison's 1999 film The Hurricane, the story based on Rubin Carter, a professional boxer wrongfully convicted in the 1960s who later became free after being exonerated in 1988, after 20 years of imprisonment. In 2014 she followed investigative journalism podcast Serial which covered the events of Hae Min Lee's killing arguing the Pakistani man Adnan Syed may not have killed her. Rizvi organized a fundraiser for Adnan's legal defense fund. During the fundraiser she was introduced to Jeffrey Deskovic, the person whom she later filmed for her documentary, Conviction.

=== Other work ===
Rizvi serves on the board of Youth Represent, an organization that empowers Black, Latinx, and other marginalized youth impacted by the criminal justice system. Rizvi is also a Forbes contributor.

== Conviction ==
Conviction recounts the true story of Jeffrey Deskovic, a 16-year-old wrongfully convicted of the rape and murder of his high school classmate, Angela Correa. The film depicts Deskovic's fight for freedom, which is portrayed as a heroic struggle.
