= Lincoln Depot Museum =

Coordinates: 41.284035°N 73.930393°W

- Location within New York
- Former name: Peekskill Freight Depot
- Location: 41 South Water Street; Peekskill, New York
- Type: non-profit
- Owners: Lincoln Depot Foundation; 50 Hudson Avenue; Peekskill, New York
- Website: lincolndepotmuseum.org

The Lincoln Depot Museum is located at 41 South Water Street in Peekskill, New York inside the Peekskill Freight Depot. The Museum is managed by the Lincoln Depot Foundation, whose mission is to preserve the history of the connection between Abraham Lincoln and Peekskill. It opened to the public on October 18, 2014.

== History ==
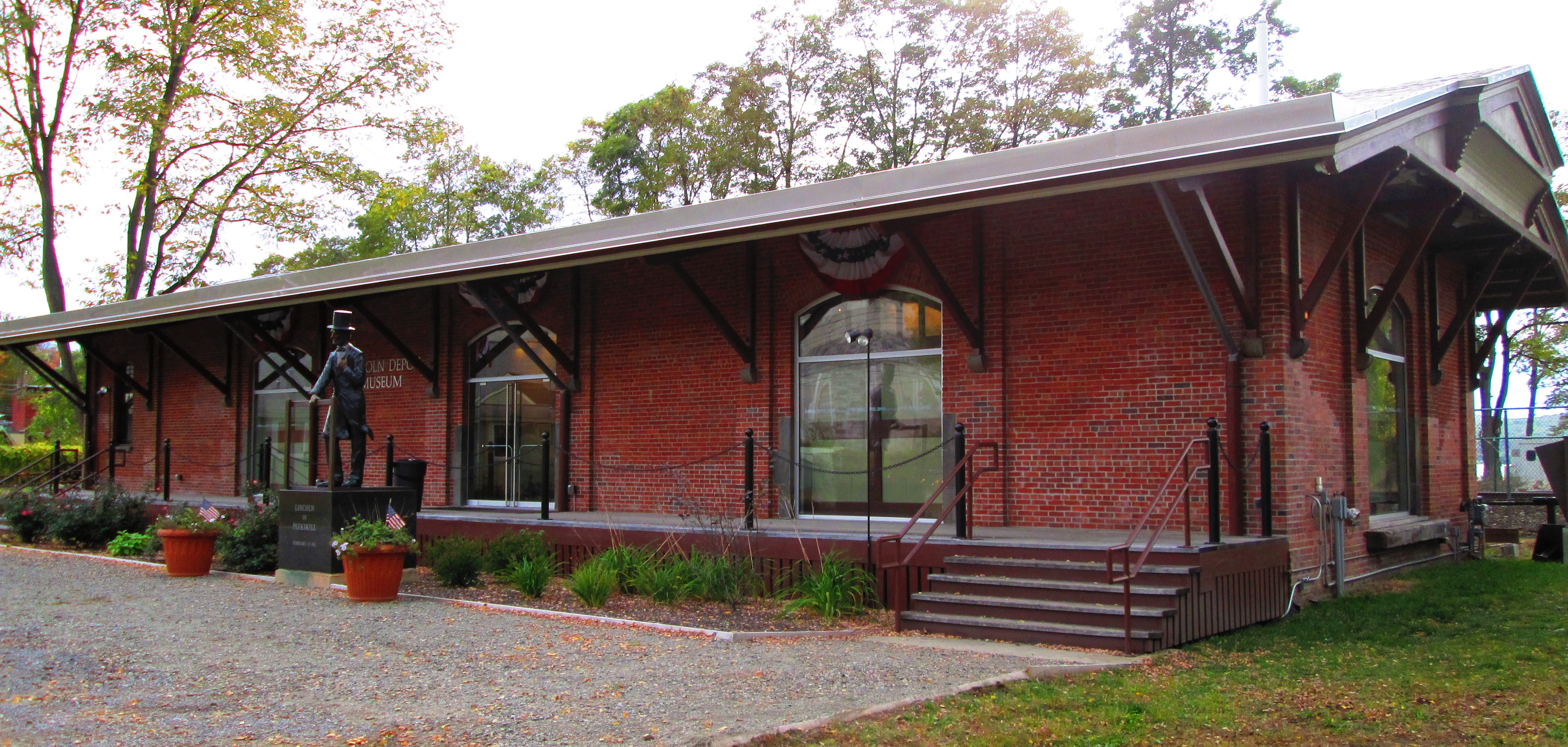
The Lincoln Depot Museum in the Peekskill Freight Depot

On February 19, 1861 President Abraham Lincoln's inaugural train made a stop at the Peekskill Freight Depot, where he gave a brief speech. Approximately 1,000 people, approximately a third of the population of Peekskill at the time, attended the President's visit. It is widely held that Lincoln made the stop on the request of his congressional colleague Congressman William Nelson from Westchester County, New York. In his speech, Lincoln requested support in the coming crisis – four states had already seceded from the Union by then. It was Lincoln's only recorded appearance in Westchester County. Lincoln's stop in Peekskill was well documented by the press at the time: "Towards noon, quite a number came to the village from the country surrounding, and wended their way to the Depot.";

After President Lincoln's assassination in 1865, his funeral train retraced the route and stopped in Peekskill on the way back to Springfield.

Peekskill has embraced Lincoln's appearance as a celebrated part of its history. A memorial stone, the Lincoln Exedra, was erected on South Street, overlooking the depot, in 1925. The speech was commemorated at its 50th anniversary in 1911, and again on its centennial in 1961. The latter occasion featured a re-enactment of the speech, with actors dressed as Lincoln and Nelson. The Lincoln Society of Peekskill keeps the memory alive and organizes other activities related to its namesake.

== Development ==
Interior concept for the Lincoln Depot Museum

In April 2005, then New York State Governor, George Pataki secured the initial funding of $600,000 for the Museum. The initial funding was part of a $1.1 Million Empire State Development Corporation (ESDC) grant for waterfront development projects in Westchester County. By the time of its groundbreaking on February 9, 2011 the Lincoln Depot Foundation had secured approximately $3 million in funding. WASA/Studio A of New York City was selected as the architect and MEP engineers for this adaptive reuse project from freight depot to museum occupancy. C&G Partners provided the concept design for the museum exhibits.
