= Peekskill Freight Depot =

- U.S. National Register of Historic Places
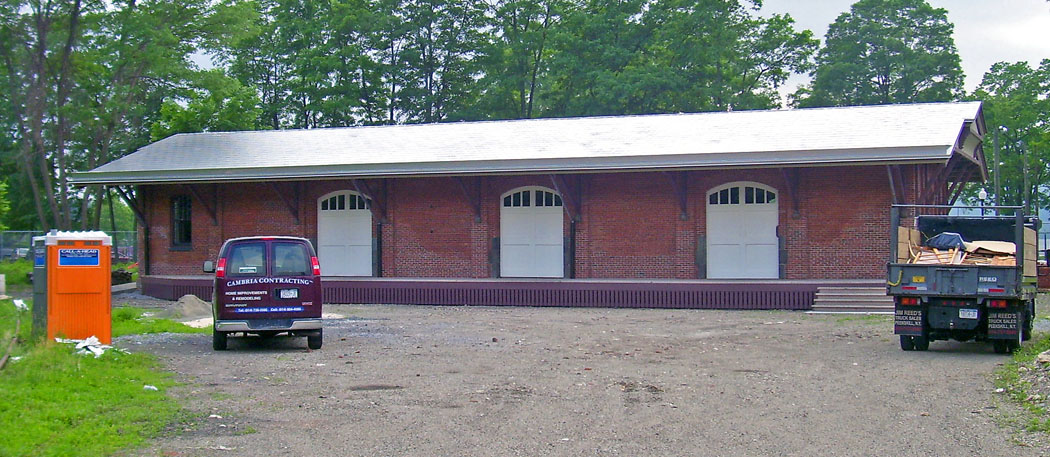
- West profile during renovation in 2007
- Location: 41 South Water Street; Peekskill, New York
- Coordinates: 41°17′14″N 73°55′48″W
- Area: less than one acre
- Built: c.1890; 136 years ago
- Architectural style: Stick, Eastlake
- NRHP reference No.: 04001207
- Added to NRHP: October 27, 2004

The Peekskill Freight Depot, sometimes called the Lincoln Depot, is located at 41 South Water Street in Peekskill, New York. It is a brick building erected in the late 19th century.

Abraham Lincoln gave a speech at this site during his train ride to Washington after being elected, his only public appearance in Westchester County. No longer in use as a depot, the building is the only intact freight-only station building along the route of the former Hudson River Railroad. In 2004, the station was added to the National Register of Historic Places, and in 2014 it was converted into the Lincoln Depot Museum.

== Building ==
The depot building is closer to the tracks and their chainlink fencing than it is to Water Street. Across the tracks is a park which lies along the Hudson River. The neighborhood is primarily commercial, with other old industrial buildings.

It is a one-story 96-by-30-foot (29.3 by 9.1 m) masonry structure faced in common-bond brick with a shallow-pitched gabled roof. The roof eave extends eight feet (2.4 m) over the elevated platform to shelter handlers while loading and unloading freight. It is supported by brackets and has decorative vergeboards at the north and south gable ends. The brick itself has segmented pilasters between the bays and some corbeling.

Before its conversion into a museum, the interior of the building retained much of its original trim, including the cement floor, wainscoting, exposed trusswork ceiling and reed molding and bullseye corner blocks around the doors.

== History ==
The first depot was built of wood around 1850 by the Hudson River Railroad to handle freight shipments into and out of what was then a busy industrial Hudson River city.) Around 1890 the present brick depot was built by the New York Central Railroad; at that time its platform had extensions to the north and south along the tracks. There are some reports of fires in the 1880s and again in 1898; and blistering of the interior paint at roof level gives evidence that there was one.

On February 19, 1861, Abraham Lincoln stopped here during his train trip to his inauguration and gave a 138-word speech at the invitation of local congressman William Nelson, who introduced him. Contemporary newspaper accounts suggest that approximately 1,000 people were present, equivalent to about a third the population of Peekskill at that time, to hear his brief request for their support in the coming crisis – four states had already seceded from the Union by then. It was Lincoln's only recorded appearance in Westchester County.

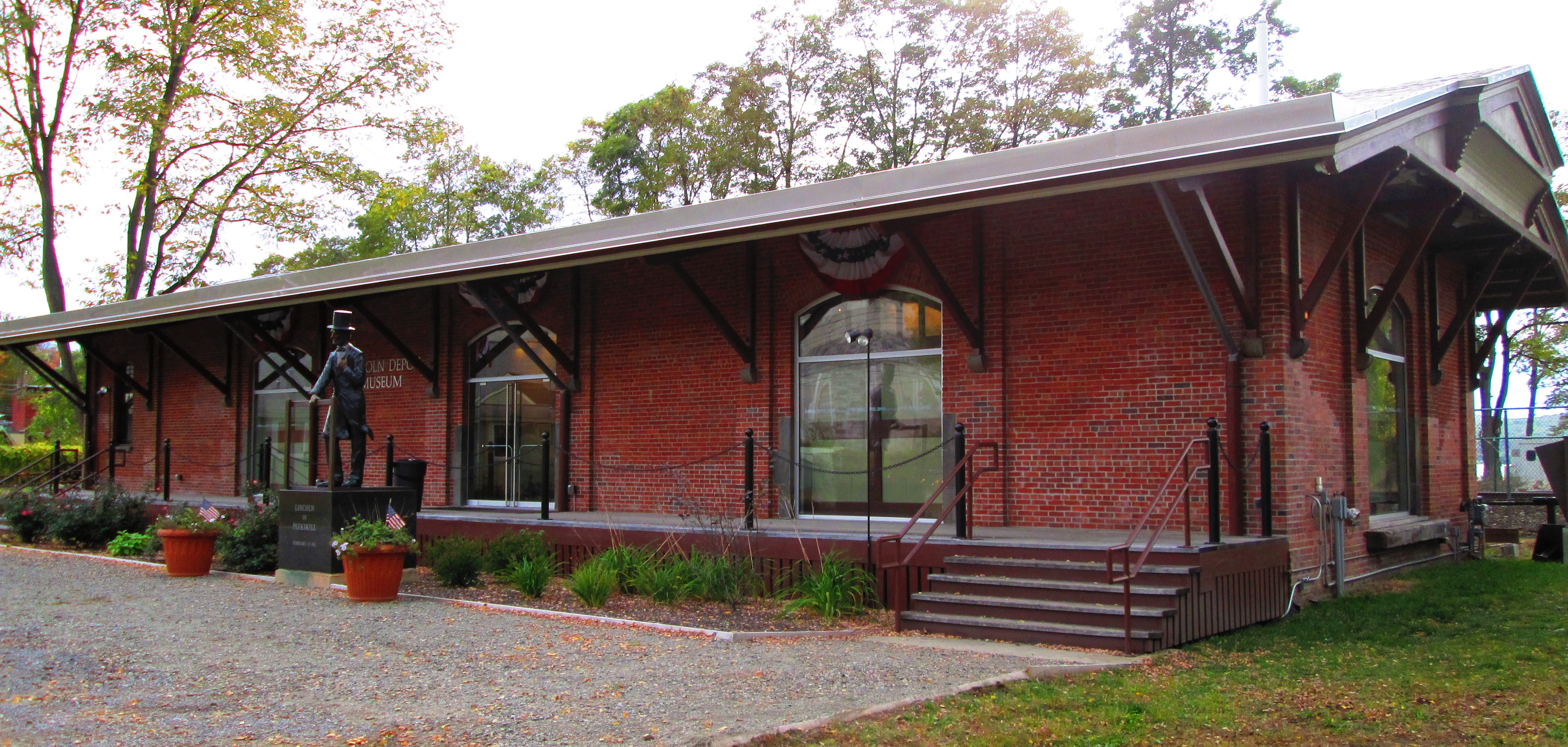
The depot after being converted into the Lincoln Depot Museum

Peekskill has embraced Lincoln's appearance as a celebrated part of its history. A memorial stone, the Lincoln Exedra, was erected on South Street, overlooking the depot, in 1925. The speech was commemorated at its 50th anniversary in 1911, and again on its centennial in 1961. The latter occasion featured a re-enactment of the speech, with actors dressed as Lincoln and Nelson. The Lincoln Society of Peekskill keeps the memory alive and organizes other activities related to its namesake.

The railroad no longer exists, and the building fell vacant as Peekskill's industrial base declined to the point that freight shipments were no longer made; the line itself is now the Metro-North Hudson commuter line, handling almost exclusively passenger traffic.

== Lincoln Depot Museum ==
In April 2005, then New York State Governor, George Pataki – the former mayor of Peekskill – secured the initial funding for the Lincoln Depot Museum to be housed in the freight depot building. Groundbreaking for the project took place on February 9, 2011, by which time the Lincoln Depot Foundation had secured approximately $3 million. The building';s restoration was completed in May 2013, with help from New York's Office of Historic Preservation. The museum opened to the public on October 18, 2014.

== See also ==
- National Register of Historic Places listings in Westchester County, New York
