= Samuel Frost Haviland =

American diplomat and lieutenant (1798–1858)

- Born: 22 December 1798; Peekskill, New York, United States
- Died: December 13, 1858 (aged 59); Santiago, Chile
- Occupations: Lieutenant; Consul General
- Spouse: Maria Feliza Ossandón e Irriberren (m. 1825–?)
- Children: 11
- Parent(s): John Downing Haviland); Anna Wright Frost

Samuel Frost Haviland (22 December 1798 – 13 December 1858) was a member of the United States Military and American diplomat.

== Biography ==
Haviland was born to John Downing Haviland (1769–1829) and Anna Wright Frost (1776–1851) in Peekskill, New York on 22 December 1798.

He was appointed 26 February 1820 to first lieutenant, 3rd artillery regiment, New York State. Shortly afterwards, he emigrated to Chile, arriving first at Valparaíso on March 1822. In Chile, he is credited with having established the first bank in that country, and in March 1839 he was appointed US Consul General at Coquimbo. He played a notable early role in the history of Chilean copper & silver exporting under private companies post-independence due to his commercial connections.

== Personal life and family ==
Haviland married Maria Feliza Ossandón e Irriberren (20 November 1803 – 26 February 1893), a native Chiilean, at Puerto de Huasco on 19 August 1825. Maria's sister, Paula, was married to Haviland's uncle Daniel, who had originally brought him to Chile. They had 11 children together. By 1902, only 3 were still living.
