= Mookie Jones =

American basketball player (born 1990)

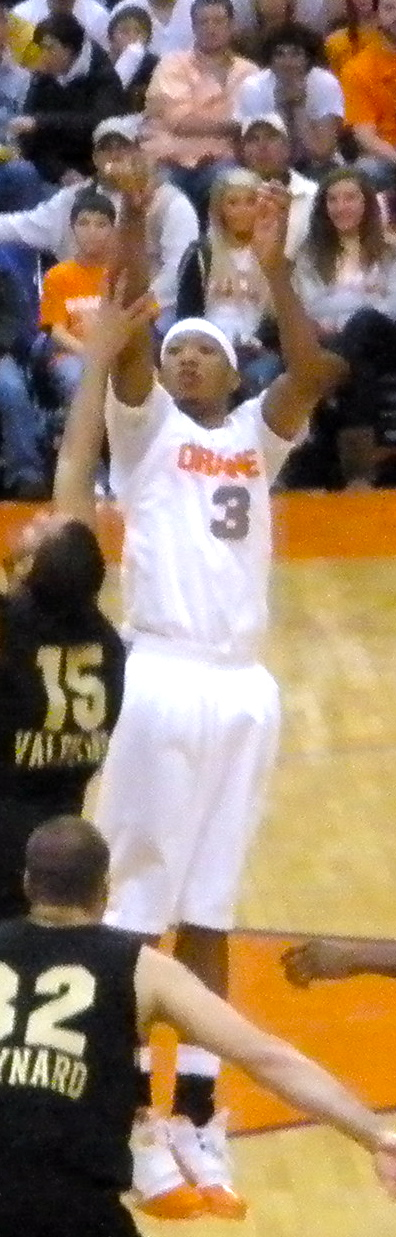

Personal information
- Born: February 22, 1990 (age 36) Peekskill, New York
- Listed height: 6 ft 6 in (1.98 m)
- Listed weight: 220 lb (100 kg)

Career information
- High school: Peekskill (Peekskill, New York)
- College: Syracuse (2008–2012)
- NBA draft: 2012: undrafted
- Position: Small forward
- Number: 21

Career history
- 2014: Rochester Razorsharks

Theodore Todd "Mookie" Jones IV (born February 22, 1990) is a 6'6", 190 lbs. forward who played basketball for the Syracuse Orange from 2008–2011.

== Early life ==
In his senior season at Peekskill High School, Jones averaged 20.1 points per game and was named to the 2008 First-Team Journal News Westchester/Putnam All-Star team. The New York State Sportswriters Association named him 2008 First-Team Class A All-State. In his Junior year Jones lead Peekskill to the 2007 class A State Title over a Glens Falls team led by former Sacramento Kings/BYU guard Jimmer Fredette. Jones played AAU with former West Virginia forward Kevin Jones.

== College ==
Jones had offers from Rutgers, DePaul, Marquette and St. Johns before settling on Syracuse.

=== 2008–09 ===
Jones would make his debut against Le Moyne, playing 10 minutes and scoring three points. The freshman would make his biggest impact in an 86–51 win against Colgate on December 1, 2008, as he played 21 minutes and scored nine points. On January 26, 2009, it was announced that Jones had suffered a muscle tear in his right hip and would miss the remainder of the season. He received a medical redshirt.

=== 2009–10 ===
During the November 24, 2009 game against Cornell Jim Boeheim approached Jones and had words with him. Mookie then got up and flung his headband as he disappeared into the tunnel leading to the locker room. Jones reappeared with 90 seconds left in the game to shake hands with Cornell. When reporters were allowed in the Syracuse locker room Jones was not at his locker. Jones cleared things up with Boeheim following the game and would go on to score 12 points in just 14 minutes the following game in an 85–60 win over Columbia.

=== 2011–12 ===
In 2012 Theodore (Mookie) Jones decided he was "done playing for Syracuse" after he was suspended by the university for a year after being accused of cyberbullying in the fall of 2011. The suspension would put Jones’ eligibility as a student-athlete in jeopardy. Jones left the team and university in the winter of 2012.

After returning to college later, he graduated in 2015.

== After college ==
As of 2023, Jones works as a basketball coach at OnTECH Charter High School in Syracuse, NY.
