= Peekskill City School District =

School district in the U.S. state of New York

Peekskill City School District (PCSD) is the school district of Peekskill, New York. It covers the entire city.

== History ==
It was headed by Superintendent Judith Johnson, the 2008 New York State School Superintendent of the Year, up until 2011.

David Fine became superintendent in 2015. He resigned in 2017. The current superintendent is Dr. David Mauricio.

== Schools ==
It consists of four elementary schools, one middle school, and one high school. The elementary schools operated on a "neighborhood" basis until 1999. Beginning the 1995–1996 school year, sixth graders were moved from elementary schools to the middle school. Until the 1998–1999 school year, each student attended the school closest to his or her home, beginning in kindergarten and ending with graduation from fifth grade. In 1999, the elementary schools were integrated, each school housing two grades. In 2009, the newly built Peekskill Middle School caused a shift in the locations of grades yet again and consequently moved grades one through five around. The high school serves grades nine through twelve.

=== Elementary schools ===
- The Uriah Hill Jr. School housed the district's early childhood education program. The ECC consisted of a pre-school and a kindergarten program. The Uriah Hill Jr. school was located at 980 Pemart Avenue. As of September 2009, Uriah Hill School closed due to the consolidation of grades in other schools and due to the Great Recession.
- Oakside Elementary School caters to the district's second and third graders. The school is located at 200 Decatur Avenue.
- Woodside Elementary School houses the district's Pre-kindergarten program, kindergarten and first grade. It is located on Depew Street.
- Hillcrest Elementary School educates the district's fourth and fifth grades. It is located at 4 Horton Drive.

=== Secondary schools ===
- Peekskill Middle School educates the district's sixth, seventh, and eighth graders. The new Middle School building opened at the beginning of the 2009–2010 school year. It is located on Washington Street, directly behind the old building. The former Peekskill Middle School was located at 212 Ringgold Street, which was later demolished.
- Peekskill High School educates most of the district's ninth, tenth, eleventh, and twelfth graders. The high school is located on the grounds of the original Peekskill Military Academy at 1072 Elm Street. For the second consecutive year, Peekskill High School is listed on Newsweek's 2008 Washington Post Challenge Index of the top high schools in the nation. That year, the school ranked in the top 5% of all high schools nationally based on the ratio of graduating seniors and students taking Advanced Placement Tests.
