= Lou Panzanaro =

American basketball coach

Lou Panzanaro is an American basketball coach who was the head coach for the Peekskill High School boys basketball team. He has coached current National Basketball Association (NBA) players. Among them are center Hilton Armstrong, and NBA all-star Elton Brand. He is a member of the New York Basketball Hall of Fame.

Panzanaro has since retired as coach and athletic director of the school.

== Milestones ==
The Red Devils beat visiting rivals Poughkeepsie 70–61 on January 21, 2009, in a boys basketball matchup, giving Panzanaro his 500th career victory as a head coach. As of July 2019, Panzanaro is first among section 1 coaches in all-time wins. The record was held by John Volpe with 529 wins. Peekskill has won five state championships during Panzanaro's tenure as coach, and has won numerous local and sectional titles.
