= William Smith (basketball, born 1949) =

American basketball player

Personal information
- Born: February 14, 1949 (age 76); Rochester, New York, U.S.
- Listed height: 7 ft 0 in (2.13 m)
- Listed weight: 220 lb (100 kg)

Career information
- High school: Rush–Henrietta (Henrietta, New York)
- College: Syracuse (1968–1971)
- NBA draft: 1971: 3rd round, 42nd overall pick
- Drafted by: Portland Trail Blazers
- Position: Center
- Number: 43

Career history
- 1971–1973: Portland Trail Blazers
- 1972–1973: Scranton Apollos
- Stats at NBA.com
- Stats at Basketball Reference

William A. Smith (born February 14, 1949) is a retired American professional basketball center who played two seasons in the National Basketball Association (NBA) as a member of the Portland Trail Blazers (1971to 1973). He was drafted by the Blazers in the third round (42 ^{nd} pick overall) of the 1971 NBA draft from Syracuse University, where he holds the individual player single game scoring record of 47 points achieved on January 14, 1971, against Lafayette College.

Smith played four games for the Scranton Apollos of the Eastern Basketball Association (EBA) during the 1972–73 season.

== Career statistics ==
Legend
GP	Games played	GS	Games started	MPG	Minutes per game
FG%	Field goal percentage	3P%	3-point field goal percentage	FT%	Free throw percentage
RPG	Rebounds per game	APG	Assists per game	SPG	Steals per game
BPG	Blocks per game	PPG	Points per game	**Bold**	Career high

=== NBA ===
==== Regular season ====
Year	Team	GP	MPG	FG%	FT%	RPG	APG	PPG
1971–72	Portland	**22**	**20.4**	.416	.594	**6.1**	**.9**	**8.3**
1972–73	Portland	8	5.4	**.600**	**.625**	1.0	.1	2.9
Career		30	16.4	.431	.597	4.8	.7	6.8
