= Peekskill High School =

Location
- 1072 Elm Street; Peekskill, New York 10566; USA; 41.288146°N 73.91761°W

Information
- Type: Public
- Established: 1929
- Principal: Dr. Jenna Ferris
- Asst. Principals: Rachel Blount, Margie Daniels and Naima Smith-Moore
- Teaching staff: 94.05 (FTE)
- Enrollment: 1,115 (2023–2024)
- Student to teacher ratio: 11.86
- Colors: Crimson and blue
- Mascot: Red Devils
- Website: phs.peekskillcsd.org

Peekskill High School, established in 1929, is located at 1072 Elm Street in Peekskill, New York, United States. It is a part of the Peekskill School District, which covers the entire city.

It educates most of the district's ninth, tenth, eleventh, and twelfth graders. The school's current principal is Dr. Jenna Ferris. Peekskill students prepare for the New York State Regents Exams in science, language, mathematics, history and English. In addition to the Regents curriculum, the high school also offers Advanced Placement courses, which prepare students to take the AP Exams offered by the College Board in early May. A new course at the school as of the 2007–2008 school year is the three-year Authentic Science Research program. Several college courses are also offered.

The school replaced the Peekskill High School at 212 Ringgold Street (1929–1972). Prior to 1929, Drum Hill School served as the high school, and is now a senior living community. The current school is located on the former grounds of the original Peekskill Military Academy, which closed in 1968.

== Clubs and sports ==
The school offers many clubs and sports for students to enrich their in-school experiences.

Fall sports:

- Football
- Women's swimming
- Men's and women's cross country
- Men's and women's soccer
- Women's tennis
- Women's volleyball

Winter sports:

- Basketball
- Bowling
- Winter track
- Wrestling
- Men's swimming

Spring sports:

- Baseball
- Softball
- Golf
- Lacrosse
- Men's tennis
- Track

Many students participate in one or more sports, in addition to one or more of the numerous clubs offered year-round.

The Drama Club performed the full Broadway score of Rodgers and Hammerstein's The Sound of Music in April 2008.

In 2010 the Drama Club performed Sondheim's Into the Woods. The show was nominated for eight Metropolitan Theater Awards, including Best Actor and Actress in a Supporting Role, Outstanding Stage Crew, Outstanding Graphic Design, Outstanding Scenic Design, Outstanding Costume Achievement, Outstanding Lobby Display, and Outstanding Instrumentalist. They won for Outstanding Stage Crew and Outstanding Costume Achievement.

In 2011, under new direction and technical direction, they performed Seussical. They were only nominated for two Metropolitan Theater Awards, Outstanding Child Actor and Outstanding Graphic Design.

2012 saw the drama club perform "You're a Good Man, Charlie Brown."

There are also various honor societies in the school, such as the National Honor Society, Math Honor Society, Mu Alpha Theta, and Science National Honor Society.

== Scandal ==
In January 2013, a scandal was discovered in the guidance department of Peekskill High School. Four counselors were reassigned as an investigation into the falsifying of transcripts took place. It was reported that 34 students had been given credits they didn't deserve. Most were given credit for a "co-op" work experience program that the district had discontinued years earlier. Superintendent James Willis said in a letter to parents, "The Board of Education and I, along with my administrative team, are absolutely appalled by what we have discovered. This won't be tolerated. Moving forward, I am organizing an internal protocols team to assess the current transcript review processes and to make recommendations to ensure something like this can never happen again." Some students might have to take summer classes or an extra semester in order to graduate on time.

== School song ==
The words of the school song were written in 1932 by Edwin Steckel, music teacher and bandmaster.

== Notable faculty and alumni ==
- Hilton Armstrong, power forward/center for the Washington Wizards
- Reggie Austin, actor
- Elton Brand, power forward for the Atlanta Hawks
- Pidge Browne, professional baseball player
- Derek Dennis, football player
- Jeffrey Deskovic, served a 15-year wrongful imprisonment sentence, exonerated by DNA evidence
- Keith Gordon Ham (later known as Kirtanananda Swami Bhaktipada), a prominent Hare Krishna ISKCON guru who oversaw the construction of the Palace of Gold in West Virginia. He was later incarcerated in prison for eight years for mail fraud.
- Tre' Johnson, former All-Pro offensive lineman for the Washington Commanders and Cleveland Browns
- Mookie Jones, basketball player
- Lou Panzanaro, head coach for the school's basketball team
- George Pataki, former Governor of New York
- Tony Schwartz, advertising pioneer, media visionary, and audio documentarian
- Bill Thomas, former NFL player for the Dallas Cowboys, Houston Oilers, and Kansas City Chiefs
- Tyler Trewhella, disability activist
