= Jeremy McNeil =

American basketball player (born 1980)

Personal information
- Born: March 11, 1980 (age 46) Los Angeles, California
- Listed height: 6 ft 8 in (2.03 m)
- Listed weight: 257 lb (117 kg)

Career information
- High school: Sam Houston (San Antonio, Texas)
- College: Syracuse (1999–2004)
- NBA draft: 2004: undrafted
- Position: Center

Career highlights
- NCAA champion (2003)

Jeremy Cheyney McNeil (born March 11, 1980) is an American former basketball player who played college basketball for Syracuse University during their first national championship in 2003. He played 135 games spanning from 1999 to 2004, which included 21 starts. He had career averages of 3.0 points and 3.4 rebounds per game.

== High school ==
He averaged close to 12 points, 10 rebounds and five blocks a game as a senior center with Coach Wayne Dickey at Sam Houston High School. He was named an Adidas All-American and ranked as a top-35 prospect.

== College career ==
As a freshman, McNeil suffered a knee injury and was granted a medical redshirt for the season.

McNeil earned the starting center job in his first full year at Syracuse, taking the spot from Billy Celluck. However, due to foul trouble, McNeil would be limited to around 15 minutes per game. In his sophomore year, McNeil lost his starting position to Craig Forth. Still, he managed to set a career high in points (3.4).

McNeil would play a key role in Syracuse's first national championship in the 2002–03 season. Although he still could not win the starting role back from Forth, McNeil proved to be a valued shot blocker off the bench, often being the last line of defense when Syracuse decided to use its full court press. In an upset of then-No. 2 Pittsburgh, McNeil, a career 49.1% free throw shooter, hit two key free throws, and added a game-winning tip.

In his final year, McNeil was the lone senior. McNeil set a career high for field goal percentage (75.5%). He finished his career at Syracuse fifth on the career shots blocked list with 260 and fifth in games played with 135.

== Professional career ==
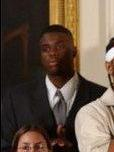
McNeil in 2003

Following his Syracuse career, McNeil played with the Kentucky Colonels in the American Basketball Association in the 2004–05 season, averaging 13.7 points and 6.5 rebounds in 16 games.

McNeil was taken with the fifth in the second round (13th overall) of the 2005 NBA Development League Draft by the Roanoke Dazzle. He was subsequently waived by the Dazzle before signing with the Florida Flame. In two games with the Florida Flame he averaged 4.0 points and 0.5 rebound. However, his season was cut short by a torn patella tendon.

McNeil then joined the Fort Worth Flyers in the 2006–07 season. He would play in nine games with the Flyers, averaging 1.4 points and 1.4 rebounds before being waived on March 30, 2007.
