= Rudy Hackett =

American basketball player and coach (born 1953)

Personal information
- Born: May 10, 1953 (age 73) Mount Vernon, New York, U.S.
- Listed height: 6 ft 9 in (2.06 m)
- Listed weight: 210 lb (95 kg)

Career information
- High school: Mount Vernon (Mount Vernon, New York)
- College: Syracuse (1972–1975)
- NBA draft: 1975: 3rd round, 37th overall pick
- Drafted by: New Orleans Jazz
- Playing career: 1975–1988
- Position: Power forward
- Number: 13, 11, 45

Career history
- 1975–1976: Spirits of St. Louis
- 1976: New York Nets
- 1976: Indiana Pacers
- 1979–1981: Libertas Forlì
- 1981–1982: Libertas Livorno
- 1982–1984: Reggio Emilia
- 1984–1987: U.S. Sangiorgese
- 1988: Reggio Emilia

Career highlights
- Second-team All-American – AP (1975)
- Stats at NBA.com
- Stats at Basketball Reference

Rudolph Hackett (born May 10, 1953) is an American former professional basketball player. A 6 ft 9 in (2.06 m) and 210 lb (95 kg) power forward, he played college basketball for the Syracuse Orange.

== College playing career ==
Hackett played college basketball at Syracuse University, with the Syracuse Orange, from 1972 to 1975.

== Professional playing career ==
Hackett was selected with the 37th pick (3rd round) in the 1975 NBA draft by the New Orleans Jazz, and with the 25th pick (3rd round) by the Spirits of St. Louis in the 1975 ABA draft. He played for the Spirits, New York Nets, and Indiana Pacers over two seasons. Hackett also played professionally in Italy.

== Post-playing career ==
Hackett is a strength and conditioning coach for the USC Trojans men's basketball team.

== Personal life ==
Rudy Hackett married an Italian woman, they have a son, Daniel Hackett, an Italian professional basketball player.
