= Scoop Jardine =

American basketball player (born 1988)

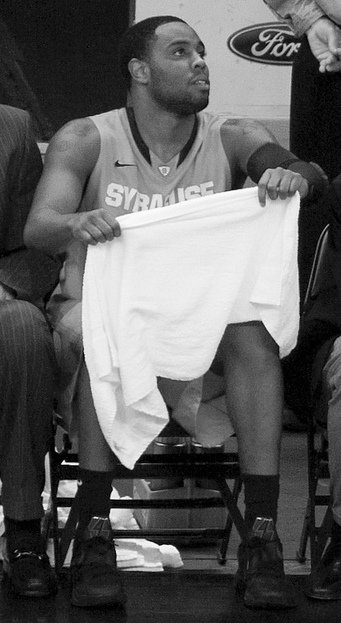
- Jardine with the Syracuse Orange in 2012

Personal information
- Born: August 9, 1988 (age 37) Philadelphia, Pennsylvania, U.S.
- Listed height: 6 ft 2 in (1.88 m)
- Listed weight: 200 lb (91 kg)

Career information
- High school: Neumann-Goretti (Philadelphia, Pennsylvania)
- College: Syracuse (2007–2012)
- NBA draft: 2012: undrafted
- Playing career: 2013–2017
- Position: Point guard

Career history
- 2013: Zadar
- 2013–2014: Tulsa 66ers
- 2016–2017: Moncton Miracles
- 2017: Niagara River Lions
- Stats at Basketball Reference

Antonio Stephen "Scoop" Jardine (born August 9, 1988) is an American former professional basketball player who last played for the Niagara River Lions of the NBL Canada. He played college basketball for the Syracuse Orange from 2007–08 to 2011–12. Jardine now resides in Los Angeles, California.

== High school ==
Jardine was raised by his single mother Antoinette Richardson, along with his siblings Shantale and Shauniqua in Southwest and South Philadelphia. At Neumann-Goretti High School, Scoop Jardine was the teammate of former SU player Rick Jackson.

Jardine led his team to the Philadelphia Catholic League championship and a No. 24 ranking in the final 2006 USA Today poll. He was rated 66th by Scout.com, was 15th-ranked shooting guard and 58th overall according to Rivals.com, and was the 68th-ranked player in the Bob Gibbons All Star Report.

== College career ==
=== 2007–08 ===
Following a season-ending injury to starting guard Eric Devendorf on December 15, 2007, Jardine was promoted to the starting lineup on December 18, 2007, against Colgate. He would start nine games—including a career high 18 points against Northeastern on December 30, 2007—before being removed from the lineup after he was suspended for the January 27, 2008 game against Providence.

Jardine was suspended after it was alleged that he knew that a stolen student identification card was being used to order more than $100 worth of food. Jardine did not eat any of the food but helped carry it in when it was delivered to his apartment on Jan. 13 2008, then tried to cover up his involvement. Jardine's cousin Robert Washington was charged in the case. Jardine returned to the lineup on February 2, 2008, against Villanova, but lost his starting spot to Kristof Ongenaet.

Jardine would appear in 33 of 35 games in his first year with Syracuse, with averages of 5.5 points and 2.5 assists per game. In the NIT Tournament, Jardine averaged 11.0 points and 4.7 assists.

=== 2008–09 ===
Jardine did not play and was forced to redshirt his sophomore season after suffering a stress fracture in his left leg.

=== 2009–10 ===
A healthy Jardine would return to the Syracuse lineup in his redshirt sophomore season to split time with Brandon Triche at the point guard spot. The backup point guard would make an immediate impact, as he scored 22 points and had 6 assists, 1 turnover and 4 steals in a 95–73 victory over then-No. 12 California. Jardine was named Sixth Man of the Year for the 2009–2010 NCAA men's Division I regular season by The Sporting News. He averaged 9.1 points, 4.3 assists and 1.2 steals during his sixth man of the year campaign.

=== 2010–11 ===
Jardine assumed the starting point guard role for the Orange in the 2010–11 season and had his best season statistic wise. He was a big contributor throughout the season playing in all 35 games averaging 12.5 points, 5.9 assists, and 1.6 steals. His biggest game was against Marquette on January 29, 2011, as he recorded a double-double with 13 assists and 13 points. However, Jardine and the Orange would fail to advance to the Sweet 16 as they lost in an upset against Marquette in the 3rd round of the NCAA tournament.

=== 2011–12 ===
In one of the most successful seasons in Syracuse history, Jardine and his teammate Kris Joseph were the senior leaders and huge contributors. Jardine and the Orange led Syracuse to the number 1 spot for 6 weeks in December and January. Jardine's numbers dropped a bit by averaging 8.9 points and 4.9 assists, but still led the Orange to a Big East regular season title. After getting only 22 MPG in the Big East tournament, Jardine played a vital role in the NCAA tournament. Jardine led the team in assists in all 4 of their tournament games and averaged 13.8 PPG. Despite all of his effort, Jardine and the Orange fell short of their Final Four and National Championship goals as they lost in a tight game against Ohio State 77–70. He finished his career at Syracuse with 9.0 points, 4.4 assists, and 1.3 steals.

== Professional career ==
Jardine went undrafted in the 2012 NBA draft and subsequently did not play professionally in 2012–13.

Jardine joined the Cleveland Cavaliers for the 2013 NBA Summer League. In September 2013, he signed with KK Zadar of Croatia. However, he was released next month after not passing the one-month tryout. Jardine played three games for Zadar, scoring a total of two points.

On November 1, 2013, Jardine was selected by the Tulsa 66ers with the 40th overall pick in the 2013 NBA Development League draft.

In the 2016–17 NBL Canada season Jardine played for the Moncton Miracles and Niagara River Lions.

== Post-playing career ==
On June 11, 2026, the New Orleans Pelicans hired Jardine to serve as a global director scout.

== National team career ==
Jardine played on Team USA at the semi-annual (Under 18) Albert Schweitzer Tournament in Mannheim, Germany in 2006. He helped the squad with 13.3 points, 3.5 rebounds, and a team-leading 3.2 assists. In the seventh-place game against host Germany, Jardine scored 23 points to go along with five rebounds and five steals, as the U.S. team won, 106–82.
