= Kristof Ongenaet =

Free agent
- Position: Forward

Personal information
- Born: 29 April 1985 (age 41) Ghent, Belgium
- Listed height: 6 ft 8 in (2.03 m)
- Listed weight: 215 lb (98 kg)

Career information
- College: Cuesta College (2005–2007); Syracuse (2007–2009)
- NBA draft: 2009: undrafted
- Playing career: 2009–present

Career history
- 2009–2011: Sutor Basket Montegranaro

Kristof Ongenaet (born 29 April 1985) is a forward from Ghent, Belgium, who is a former player for the Syracuse Orange. He played for Sutor Basket Montegranaro in the Italian-based Lega Basket Serie A league.

== Team Belgium ==
Before arriving at Cuesta College, Ongenaet had been a member of the Belgium National Junior Team.

== Junior College ==
Prior to attending Syracuse University, Ongenaet played for Cuesta College, a community college in San Luis Obispo, California. Ongenaet averaged 10.3 points, a CCCAA-leading 12.3 rebounds and 3.1 assists per game as a freshman with the Cougars. In his sophomore season, he averaged 12 points, 11.7 rebounds and 3.8 assists per game.

He was named to the Western State Conference first team after helping Cuesta to its first post-season berth since 1999. The Cougars were second in their division with a 17–16 record overall and 9–3 in the conference. Ongenaet left the Cuesta program ranked first in career rebound average (11.9) and second in career field-goal percentage (59.7%).

== College ==
On 8 May 2007, Ongenaet signed a letter of intent to play at Syracuse University. He also had offers from Northwestern, Colorado, Cal-Irvine and Kansas State, and became the sixth recruit in Syracuse's 2007 class.

=== 2007–08 ===
Ongenaet would appear in 33 contests in the 2007–08 season, including starting the final 15 games of the season, with averages of 4.5 points and 4.5 rebounds per game. His best performance of the season was a 10-point and 11 rebound showing against the Seton Hall Pirates.

=== 2008–09 ===
Ongenaet began the season as the team's starting forward, but after the first 11 games, he was relegated to the bench in favor of Rick Jackson. Ongenaet would later become a key contributor off the bench, including a seven-point, 11 rebound effort against Villanova on 22 February 2009 and 12 points and seven rebounds against Seton Hall in the first round of the Big East Tournament on 11 March 2009. In his final home game against Rutgers on 3 March 2009, he would score 10 points to go along with six rebounds. Ongenaet would finish the season with averages of 3.1 points and 4.8 rebounds per game.

== Professional career ==
On 6 August 2009, it was announced that Ongenaet signed a three-year contract with the Italian team Montegranaro.
