= Peekskill, New York =

- City
- City of Peekskill
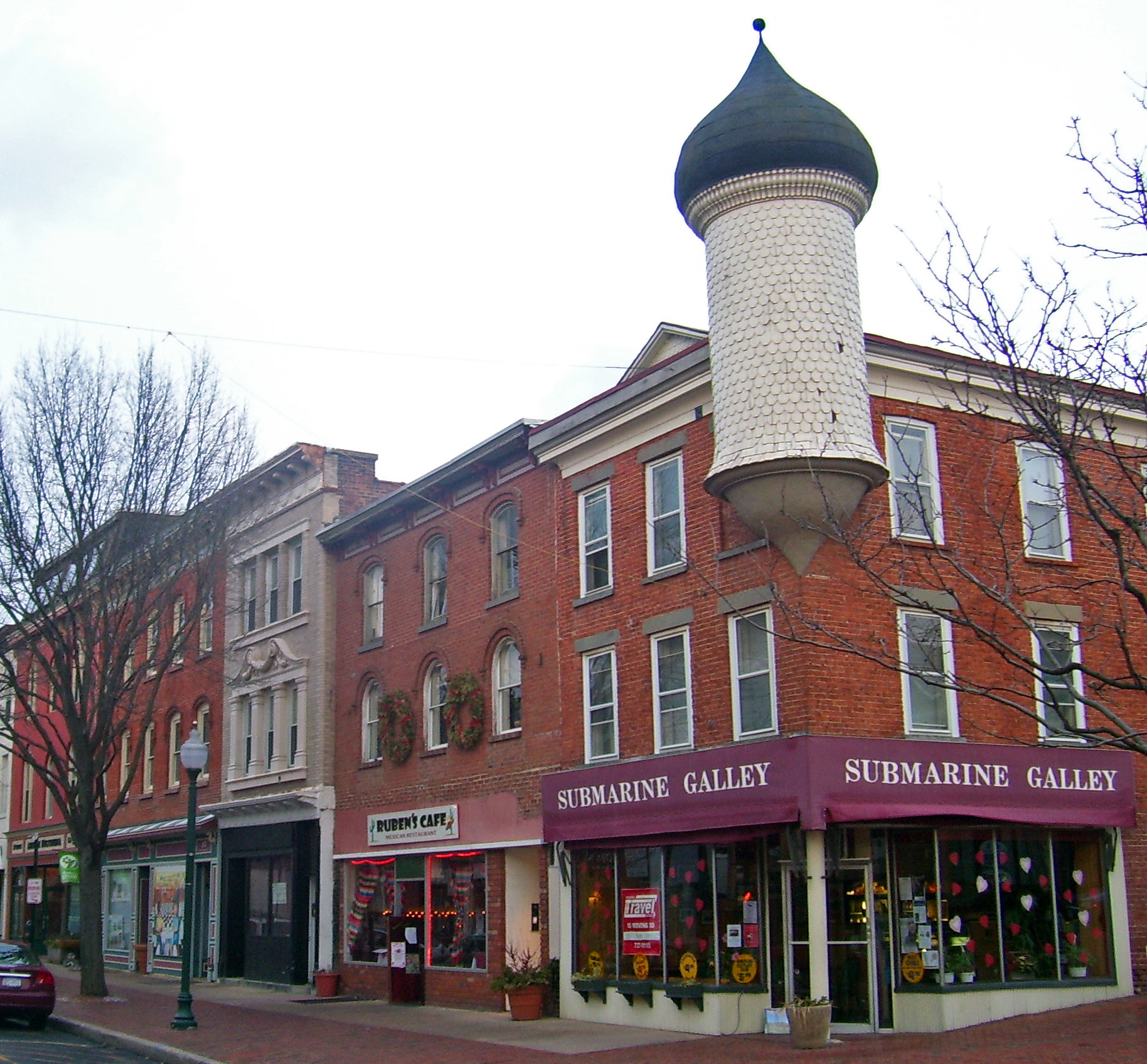
- Downtown Peekskill

- Seal

- Location in Westchester County and New York
- Interactive map of Peekskill
- Coordinates: 41°17′N 73°55′W
- Country: United States
- State: New York
- County: Westchester
- Incorporated (village): 1816; 210 years ago
- Incorporated (city): 1940; 86 years ago

Government
  - Type: Council-Manager
  - Mayor: Vivian C. McKenzie (D)
  - City Manager: Matthew Alexander
  - Common Council: Members' List: • Patricia Riley (D) Deputy Mayor; • Kathleen Talbot (D); • Robert Scott (D); • Dwight H. Douglas (D); • Ramon A. Fernandez (D); • Brian Fassett (D)

Area
  - Total: 5.57 sq mi (14.43 km^{2})
  - Land: 4.34 sq mi (11.25 km^{2})
  - Water: 1.23 sq mi (3.18 km^{2})
- Elevation: 128 ft (39 m)

Population (2020)
  - Total: 25,431
  - Density: 5,854/sq mi (2,260.3/km^{2})
- Time zone: UTC-5 (Eastern (EST))
  - Summer (DST): UTC-4 (EDT)
- ZIP Code: 10566
- Area code: 914
- FIPS code: 36-56979
- GNIS feature ID: 0960097
- Website: cityofpeekskillny.gov

Peekskill is a city in northwestern Westchester County, New York, United States, 35 miles (56 km) north of New York City. Established as a village in 1816, it was incorporated as a city in 1940. It lies on a bay along the east side of the Hudson River, across from Jones Point in Rockland County. The population was 25,431 at the 2020 U.S. census, up from 23,583 at the 2010 census. It is the third-largest municipality in northern Westchester County, after Cortlandt and Yorktown.

The area was an early American industrial center, primarily for iron plow and stove products. The Binney & Smith Company, now named Crayola LLC and makers of Crayola products, is linked to the Peekskill Chemical Company founded by Joseph Binney at Annsville in 1864, and succeeded by a partnership by his son Edwin and nephew Harold Smith in 1885.

The well-publicized Peekskill Riots of 1949 involved attacks and a lynching-in-effigy occasioned by Paul Robeson's benefit concerts for the Civil Rights Congress, although the main assault following the September concert properly took place in nearby Van Cortlandtville. The mayor at the time was John N. Schnieder, a Democrat. Nevertheless, the city of Peekskill has since had multiple African American mayors since 1984.

== History ==
=== Pre-Revolution ===
In September 1609, English explorer Henry Hudson, captain of the Half Moon, anchored along the reach of the Hudson River at Peekskill. His first mate noted in the ship's log that it was a "very pleasant place to build a town". After the establishment of the province of New Netherland, New Amsterdam resident Jan Peeck made the first recorded contact with the Lenape people of this area, then identified as "Sachoes". The date is not certain (possibly early 1640s), but agreements and merchant transactions took place, formalized in the Ryck's Patent Deed of April 21, 1685.

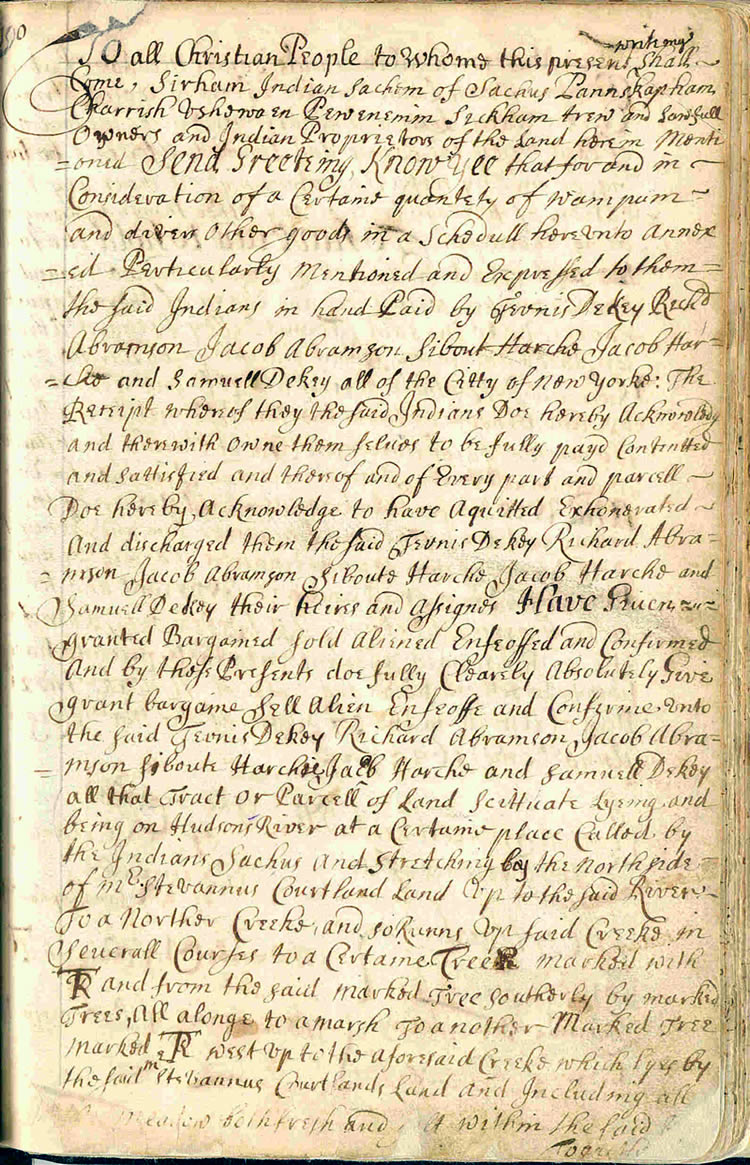
First page of Ryck's patent with the name of Sachem Sirham, chief of the Sachoes.

Peekskill derives from a combination of Peeck's surname and the Dutch word for stream, kil or kill.

== Indian Village of Sachoes ==
Not much is currently known about the village of the Sachoes or their origin. It was suggested by city historian Charles Arthur Clark that the grove of tall pine trees that the Sachoes lived amongst were "not a native of this region, so it is believed that Indians must have brought them from somewhere, and planted them. The same may be believed about the cluster of weeping willow trees indicated."

The last known Sachem (chief) of the Sachoes at the time of the signing of Ryck's Patent was named Sirham. After trading with Jan Peeck for a considerable amount of the time, the Sachoes began calling the creek where he set up his trading post as Jan Peeck's Kill (or "John Peek's Creek" in the later English), and is likely how the city's name came to be.

Some early writings regarding the Natives and Peekskill refer to the last Sachem as "Saham." Other names quoted as the locality now known as Peekskill were Sachus, Sackhoes and Sackock. They are equivalents and refer to the outlet of Magregere's Brook and have the same meaning - "at the mouth or outlet of a creek or river." Their territory extended from this brook to Dickey Brook, which runs through Depew Park and Blue Mountain Reservation. Sachus is regarded as the first Sachem of Sachoes. This name can be translated "black kettle". After the signing of the patent, portions of then Van Cortlandt Manor, north of Magregories brook remained in its wilderness state and the natives roamed the entire section until approximately 1742.

The Sachoe tribe play a prominent role in World's End, a novel by T. C. Boyle which takes place in a fictitious version of Peekskill named Peterskill.

== Camp Peekskill and Fort Independence ==
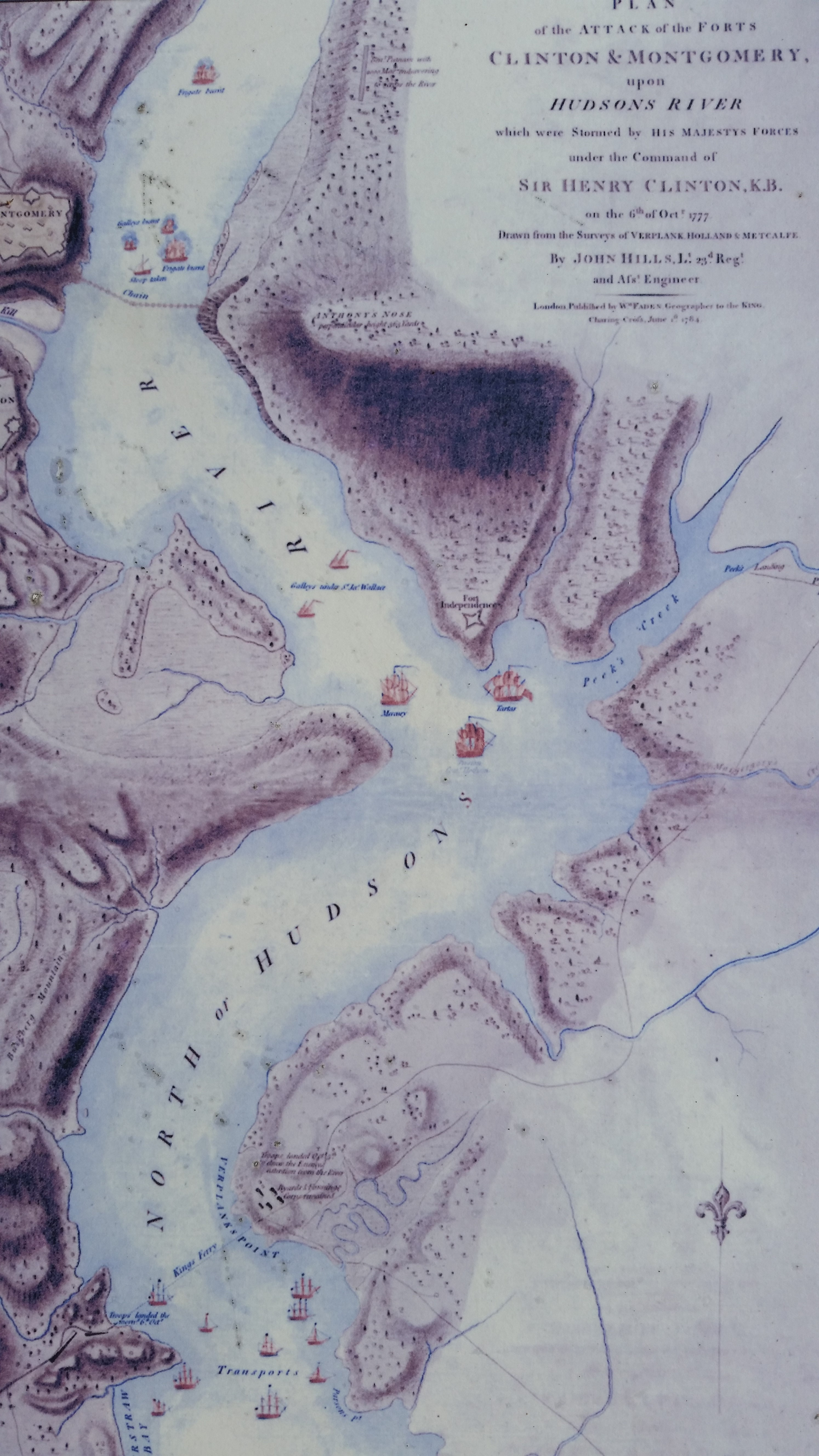
Fort Independence on the Hudson, depicted on an improved, published version of British commander-in-chief Sir Henry Clinton's battle map of October 6, 1777

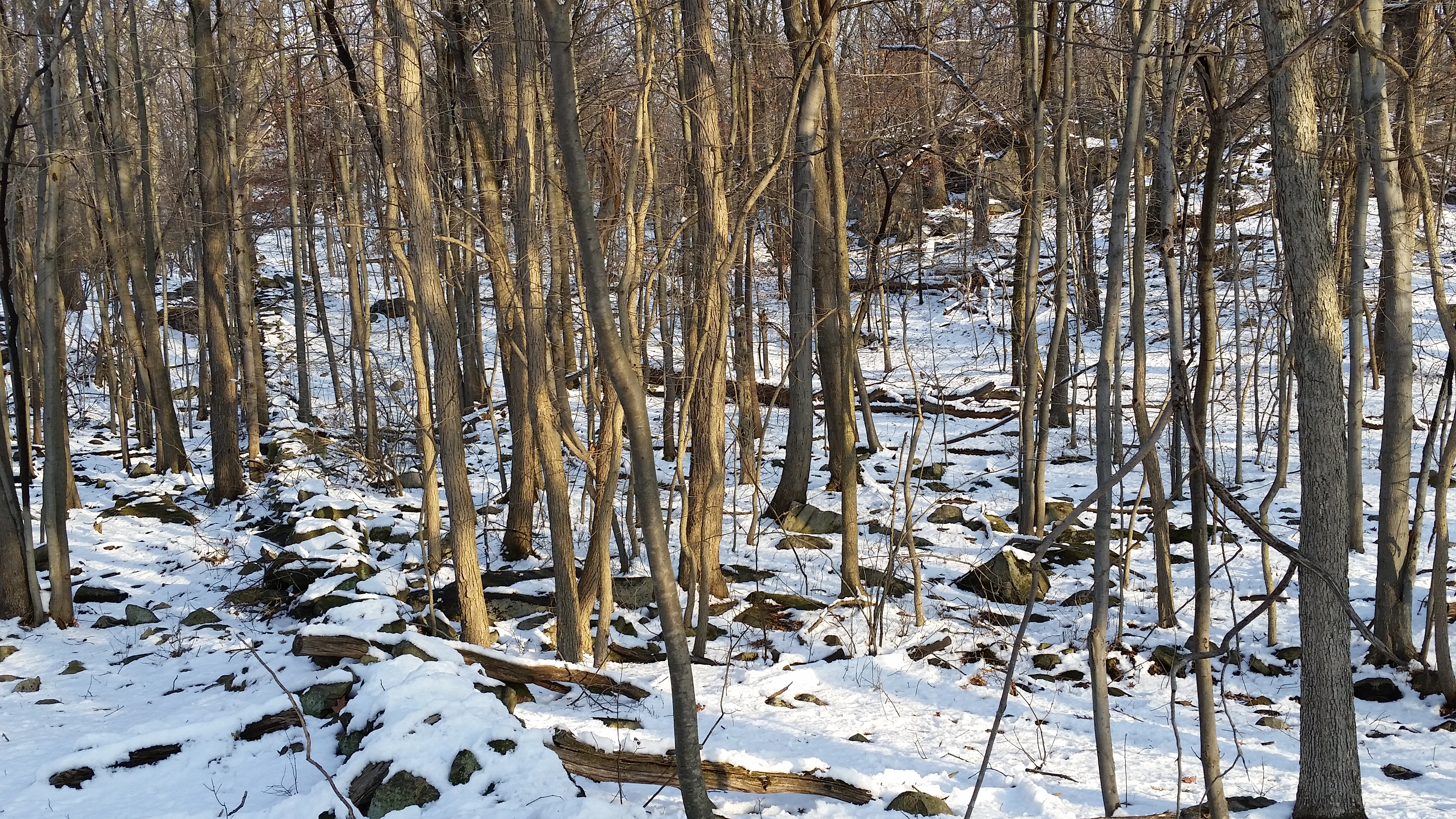
Remnants of the Eastern redoubt in Fort Hill Park (2014)

Settlement was slow in the early 18th century. By the time of the American Revolution, the small community of Peekskill was an important manufacturing center, which made it attractive to the Continental Army.

In 1776, it established an outpost here, called Camp Peekskill, which contained five barracks and two redoubts.

Several creeks and streams powered the Peekskill mills, which provided gunpowder, leather, planks, and flour. Slaughterhouses provided fresh meat, easily shipped from docks along the river. Much was needed to support Fort Independence and several other forts and garrisons protecting the Hudson River Chains between Bear Mountain Bridge and Anthony's Nose, constructed to prevent British naval passage upriver.

Though Peekskill's terrain and mills were beneficial to the Patriot cause, they also made tempting targets for British raids. The most damaging attack took place in early spring of 1777, when an invasion force of a dozen vessels led by a warship and supported by infantry overwhelmed the American defenders of Camp Peekskill, who had to burn the barracks, storehouses, and the wharf and retreat north. In 1929, the Village of Peekskill would purchase the site to preserve its history, becoming Fort Hill Park.

Fort Independence combined with nearby Forts Montgomery and Clinton to defend the Hudson River Valley. Initially called Fort Constitution, Fort Independence was built in August 1776 on Roa Hook, a small peninsula on the north bank of Annsville Creek as it empties into the Hudson roughly a mile south of the village of Peekskill. It was evacuated in October 1777 when the other two forts fell after the Battle of Forts Clinton and Montgomery.

The abandoned fort was destroyed by British troops, and the site was later obliterated by quarry operations.

On leaving New Windsor in June 1781, Washington briefly established his quarters at Peekskill.

== Post-Revolution ==
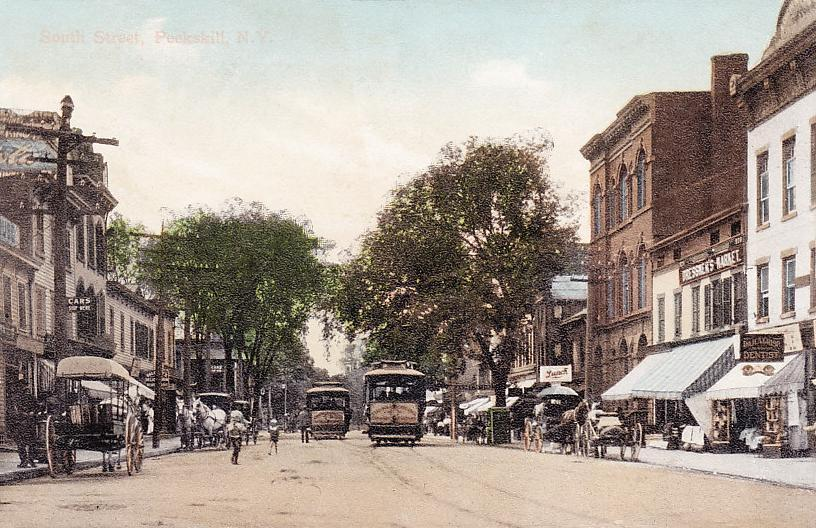
South Street in 1908

Peekskill's first legal incorporation of 1816 was reactivated in 1826 when Village elections took place. The Village was further incorporated within the Town of Cortlandt in 1849 and remained so until separating as a city in 1940.

In 1859, Henry Ward Beecher bought a 36-acre farm at Peekskill. He made many improvements and established a summer home for his family. In 1902, the locally prominent McFadden family bought the property. In 1987, the Beecher-McFadden Estate was added to the National Register of Historic Places.

In August 1949, following reports misquoting Paul Robeson's speech to the World Peace Conference in Paris as saying that African Americans would not fight for the United States in any prospective war against the Soviet Union, a planned benefit concert for the Civil Rights Congress in Peekskill was canceled amid White Nationalist and anti-communist violence. An effigy of Robeson was lynched in the town. The artists planned a second concert in nearby Van Cortlandtville on a farm owned by a Holocaust survivor. (His house was subsequently shot into and brickbats thrown through his windows.) The publicity drew a crowd of around 20,000, and two men with rifles were discovered and removed before any violence during the concert. It was one of the earliest performances of Pete Seeger's "If I Had a Hammer"; Robeson sang surrounded by union guards and volunteers from the audience as protection against snipers. Afterward, area police and state troopers directed exiting traffic down a single road into an ambush where rocks were thrown through car windows (even at cars with small children). Some were overturned and their occupants beaten without police intervention. These Peekskill Riots were subsequently well-publicized in news reports and folk songs and formed a major event in E.L. Doctorow's historical fiction novel The Book of Daniel.

Peekskill was the landing point of a fragment of the Peekskill Meteorite, just before midnight on October 9, 1992. At least 16 people recorded the meteoric trail on film. This was only the fourth meteorite in history for which an exact orbit is known. The rock had a mass of 27.7 pounds (12.6 kg) and punched through the trunk of a Peekskill resident's automobile upon impact.

The Peekskill Evening Star and the Peekskill Highland Democrat were two of the city's daily newspapers through much of the city's history. The Evening Star published under various mastheads from the 19th century on, and as the Evening Star from 1939 until 1985, when the paper folded into what became the nexus of the Journal News, a conglomeration of local papers throughout Westchester County. But the Journal News focused more on statewide and New York City issues, which led to the founding of the Peekskill Herald in 1986. Although numerous prominent citizens came together to try to keep the paper afloat after a series of New York Times articles about the paper's foundering fiscal situation, it folded in 2005, replaced by the Peekskill Daily in 2009.

The Centennial Firehouse, built in 1890, was under a U.S. Route 9 bridge. During the bridge's original construction in 1932, part of the roof of the firehouse was removed. As part of a 2008 highway reconstruction project it was to be relocated to a new historic district. The city spent $150,000 in grant money in preparing the building. Unfortunately a mechanical failure during a turn caused the building to collapse.

In 1984, Richard E. Jackson became Peekskill's first African American mayor.

== Geography ==
Peekskill is located at 41°17′N 73°55′W (41.2889, −73.9200) in northwestern Westchester County.

According to the United States Census Bureau, the city has an area of 5.5 square miles (14 km^{2}), of which 4.3 square miles (11 km^{2}) is land and 1.1 square miles (2.8 km^{2}) (20.99%) is water. The city's eastern border is the Town of Cortlandt and its western border is the Hudson River.

== Demographics ==
Historical population
Census	Pop.	Note	%±
1870	6,560		—
1880	6,893		5.1%
1890	9,676		40.4%
1900	10,358		7.0%
1910	15,245		47.2%
1920	15,868		4.1%
1930	17,125		7.9%
1940	17,311		1.1%
1950	17,731		2.4%
1960	18,737		5.7%
1970	19,283		2.9%
1980	18,236		−5.4%
1990	19,536		7.1%
2000	22,441		14.9%
2010	23,583		5.1%
2020	25,431		7.8%
U.S. Decennial Census

=== 2020 census ===
As of the 2020 census, Peekskill had a population of 25,431. The median age was 39.5 years. 20.9% of residents were under the age of 18 and 15.6% of residents were 65 years of age or older. For every 100 females there were 95.1 males, and for every 100 females age 18 and over there were 91.8 males age 18 and over.

100.0% of residents lived in urban areas, while 0.0% lived in rural areas.

There were 9,813 households in Peekskill, of which 30.0% had children under the age of 18 living in them. Of all households, 37.3% were married-couple households, 20.7% were households with a male householder and no spouse or partner present, and 34.1% were households with a female householder and no spouse or partner present. About 33.2% of all households were made up of individuals and 14.1% had someone living alone who was 65 years of age or older.

There were 10,464 housing units, of which 6.2% were vacant. The homeowner vacancy rate was 1.4% and the rental vacancy rate was 4.5%.

Racial composition as of the 2020 census
Race	Number	Percent
White	9,132	35.9%
Black or African American	5,106	20.1%
American Indian and Alaska Native	235	0.9%
Asian	737	2.9%
Native Hawaiian and Other Pacific Islander	6	0.0%
Some other race	7,038	27.7%
Two or more races	3,177	12.5%
Hispanic or Latino (of any race)	11,160	43.9%

=== 2020 American Community Survey ===
According to the American Community Survey in 2020, the city was 13.8% Ecuadorian, 10.4% Puerto Rican, and 4.9% Guatemalan.

=== 2010 census ===
As of the 2010 United States census, there were 23,583 people living in the city. The racial makeup of the city was 35.8% White, 21.4% Black, 0.2% Native American, 2.9% Asian, <0.1% Pacific Islander, 0.3% from some other race and 2.5% from two or more races. 36.9% were Hispanic or Latino of any race.

=== 2000 census ===
As of the census of 2000, there were 22,441 people, 8,696 households, and 5,348 families living in the city. The population density was 5,189.7 inhabitants per square mile (2,003.8/km^{2}). There were 9,053 housing units at an average density of 2,093.6 units per square mile (808.3 units/km^{2}). The racial makeup of the city was 57.12% White, 25.54% African American, 0.42% Native American, 2.38% Asian, 0.06% Pacific Islander, 9.83% from other races, and 4.64% from two or more races. Hispanic or Latino of any race were 21.92% of the population.

There were 8,696 households, out of which 30.5% had children under the age of 18 living with them, 39.7% were married couples living together, 16.3% had a female householder with no husband present, and 38.5% were non-families. 31.3% of all households were made up of individuals, and 10.8% had someone living alone who was 65 years of age or older. The average household size was 2.55 and the average family size was 3.18.

In the city, the population was spread out, with 24.4% under the age of 18, 8.3% from 18 to 24, 34.9% from 25 to 44, 20.9% from 45 to 64, and 11.5% who were 65 years of age or older. The median age was 35 years. For every 100 females, there were 94.2 males. For every 100 females age 18 and over, there were 91.0 males.

The median income for a household in the city was $47,177, and the median income for a family was $52,645. Males had a median income of $38,091 versus $34,757 for females. The per capita income for the city was $22,595. About 10.3% of families and 13.7% of the population were below the poverty line.

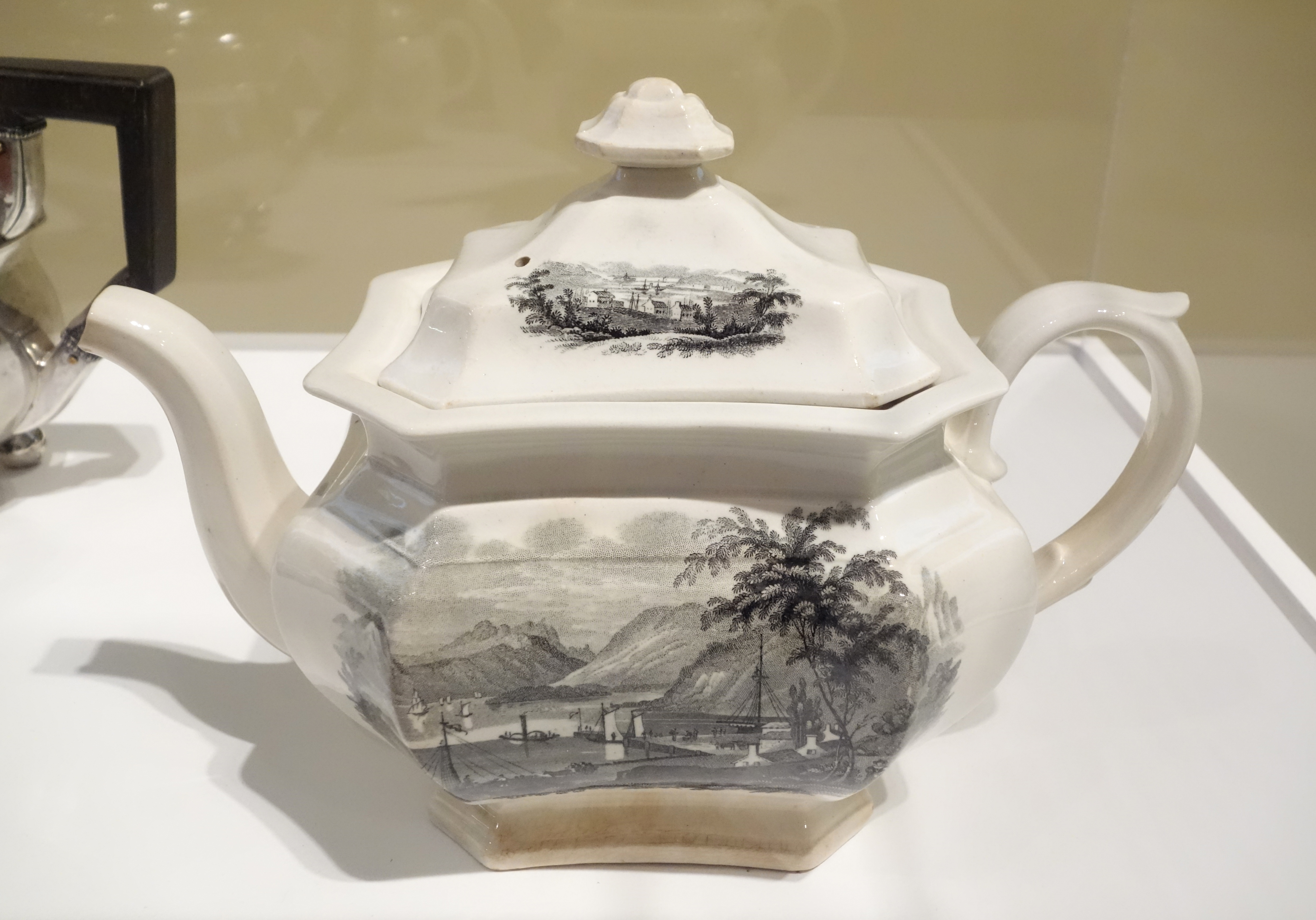
Transfer-printed teapot for the American market, c. 1845, showing Peekskill Landing, William Ridgway & Company, Hanley, England

== Arts and culture ==
Some local art-related highlights included Paramount Center for the Arts, a restored 1930 movie palace that served as the area's cultural hub, offering music, comedy, drama and independent films before suspending operations in 2012 and reopening in 2013 as the Paramount Hudson Valley Theater; STUDIO No.9 Gallery and Workshops; and the Peekskill Coffee House, which showcases local acts. The Bean Runner Cafe, on South Division Street, and 12 Grapes, on North Division Street, also showcase local artists and musicians.

The Hudson Valley Museum of Contemporary Art (Hudson Valley MOCA), formerly known as the Hudson Valley Center for Contemporary Art, has a 12,000-foot exhibition space and an artist-in-residence program.

== Media ==
Locally owned WLNA 1420 AM has served the community since 1948.

== Parks ==
The town has several parks and recreation areas, including Charles Point, with bay and river views; Depew Park, which has pools and a pond in addition to ballfields and trails and is the home of the Recreation Department headquarters; Franklin Park; Lepore Park; Fort Hill Park; Peekskill Dog Park; Peekskill Stadium; Riverfront Green Park; and Tompkins Park (home of Little League).

== Education ==
=== Primary and secondary schools ===
The Peekskill City School District is the local school district, covering the entire city, with Peekskill High School the main high school.

The Roman Catholic Archdiocese of New York operates Catholic schools in Westchester County. Our Lady of the Assumption School in Peekskill closed in 2013. The closest Catholic school to Peekskill is St. Columbanus School, which is in Cortlandt Manor.

== Healthcare ==
Peekskill is served by the Hudson Valley Hospital Center (HVHC), founded in 1889 as Peekskill Hospital on lower South Street. In 2014, the hospital began an affiliation with New York-Presbyterian Hospital and is now called New York Presbyterian – Hudson Valley Hospital.

The hospital has 128 inpatient beds and includes a comprehensive cancer center, maternity center, neonatal intensive care unit, and surgery center, among other patient care services.

The city also has an emergency medical service staffed by EMTs and paramedics from the city's fire department and volunteer ambulance corps. The fire department staffs seven EMTs and eight paramedics whereas the volunteer corps has 60 active riding members. Most patients are transported to NYP-Hudson Valley Hospital.

== Sports ==
The original Peekskill Stadium served as the home of the Peekskill Highlanders minor league baseball team from 1946 until 1949. After baseball left Peekskill, the facility hosted stock car racing and wrestling until 1957 when the property was transitioned to a shopping center. (Note: Geolocation of Peekskill Speedway: 41.2711°N 73.9361°W)

In 2004 the new Peekskill Stadium was constructed on a former Louisa Street dump site. The $2.6 million professional grade facility has a center field as deep as many major league stadiums.

== Transportation ==
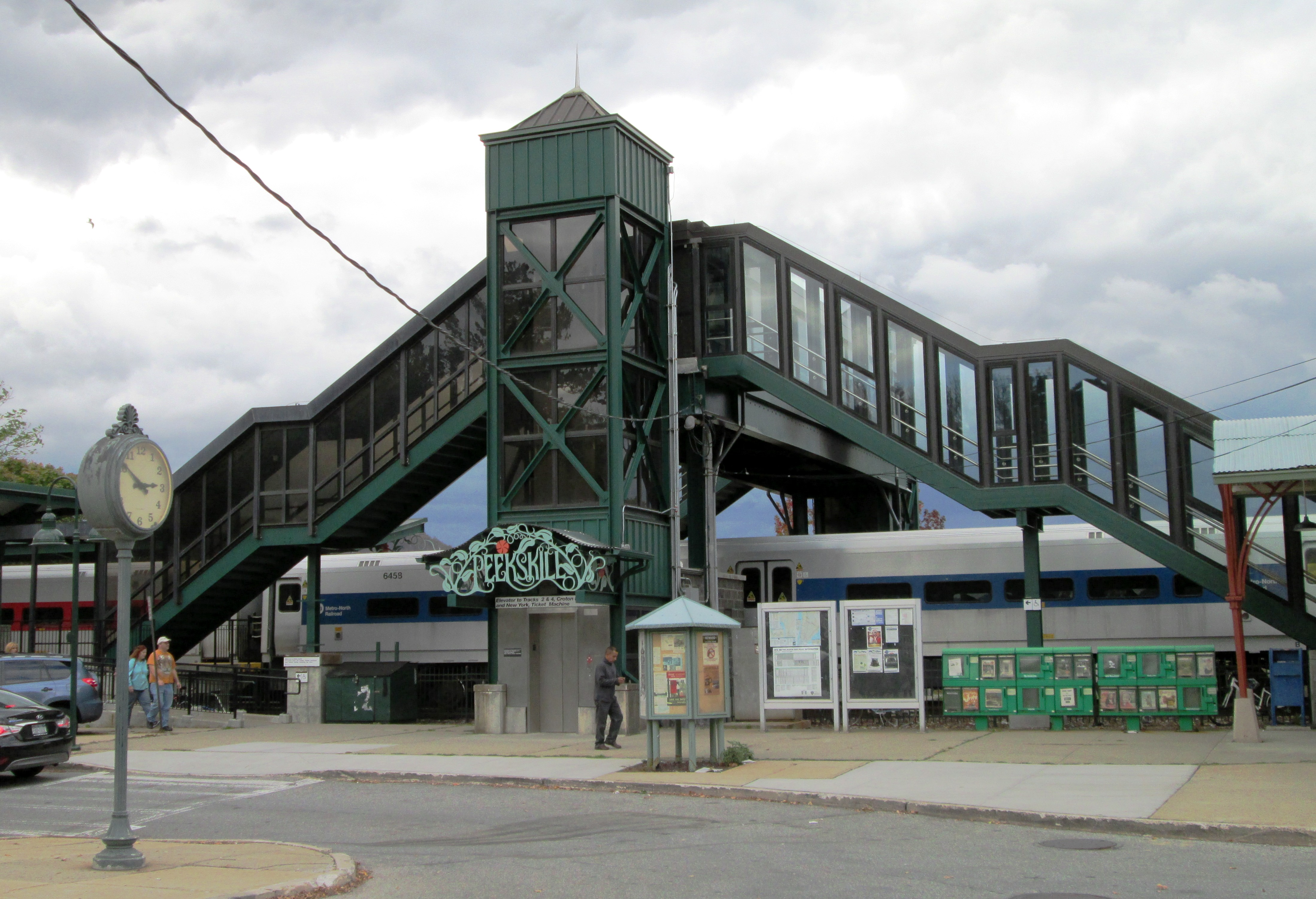
The Peekskill station

Peekskill train station provides commuter service to New York City, 41 miles (66 km) away via Metro-North Railroad. The Bee-Line Bus System provides bus service to Peekskill on routes 14, 15, 16, 17, 18, and 31. The Bear Mountain Bridge, five miles (8.0 km) to the northwest, gives road access to Bear Mountain State Park across the Hudson River, Palisades Interstate Parkway and to the United States Military Academy at West Point via US 6 and US 202. The Croton Expressway portion of US 9 ends here. NY 9A and NY 35 also run through the city.

== Notable people ==
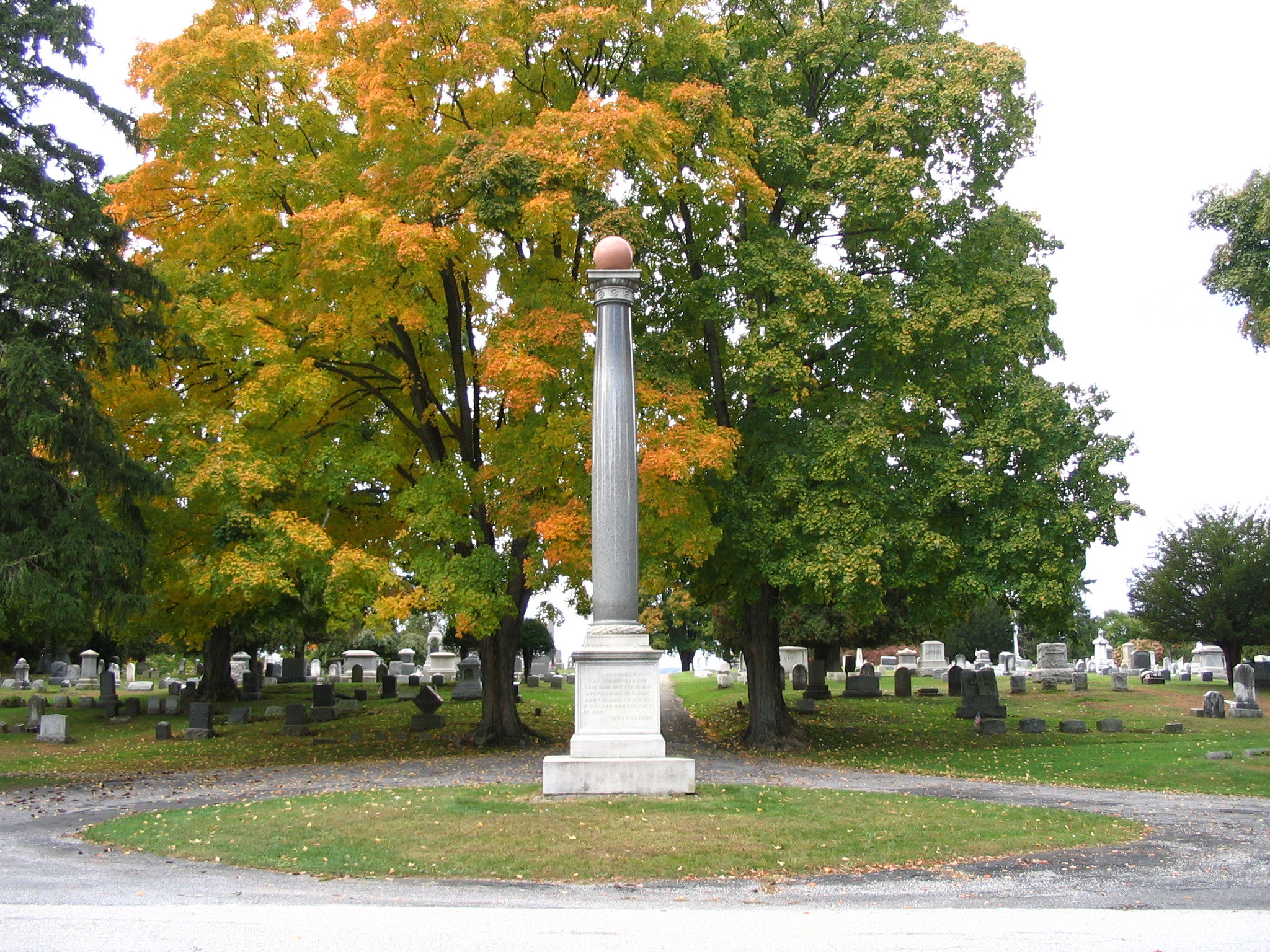
Memorial in Hillside Cemetery to Major General Seth Pomeroy of the Massachusetts militia, who died in Peekskill en route to providing aid to General George Washington in New Jersey during the Revolutionary War

- Hilton Armstrong, former NBA basketball professional, is a Peekskill High School graduate.
- Reggie Austin, an actor, was born in Peekskill and is a Peekskill High School Graduate.
- Peter Bagge, a noted cartoonist, was born and brought up in Peekskill.
- Becca Balint, Congresswoman for Vermont's at-large congressional district, raised in Peekskill
- Moses S. Beach, politician, New York Sun's owner, friend of Mark Twain
- Henry Ward Beecher was an influential Civil War-era minister who built his family mansion on East Main Street in 1878.
- T. C. Boyle, a novelist, is a former Peekskill resident.
- Elton Brand, an NBA All-Star basketball professional, is a Peekskill High School graduate. Brand is now General Manager of the Philadelphia 76ers.
- Benjamin Civiletti, a former United States Attorney General and attorney, was born in Peekskill.
- Harriet Redfield Cobb, longtime math professor at Smith College, born in Peekskill
- Peter Cooper, industrialist, inventor and founder of Cooper Union, lived in Peekskill during his childhood and teenage years.
- Chauncey Depew was chairman of the board of the New York Central Railroad and then served as a United States senator for New York.
- Abel Ferrara, an independent filmmaker, was born in the Bronx, moved to Peekskill as a child and graduated from high school there.
- Mel Gibson, actor, director, producer and screenwriter, was born in Peekskill.
- Jackie Gleason, actor and comedian, lived in Peekskill from 1959 to 1963.
- Theodore Haupt, American modernist artist, lived in Peekskill from 1941 until 1948.
- Samuel Frost Haviland, established first bank in Chile.
- James William Husted was a U.S. Representative from New York.
- Richard E. Jackson, a former Peekskill mayor, was the first African-American mayor in New York State.
- Tre Johnson, a former NFL lineman, graduated from Peekskill High School, and had a nine-year NFL career highlighted by his selection to the 2000 Pro Bowl with the Washington Redskins.
- Malcolm Koonce, NFL Defensive End for the Las Vegas Raiders
- Sean Murphy, MLB catcher for the Atlanta Braves
- George Pataki, former New York Governor was born in Peekskill. He served as Peekskill's mayor from 1981 to 1984.
- Cornelius A. Pugsley was a congressman and preservationist whose name is still attached to a national preservation award for public parks.
- Paul Reubens, an entertainer (aka Pee-wee Herman)
- Marc Stein, historian of LGBTQ history in the United States and president of the Organization of American Historians.
- Kirtanananda Swami Bhaktipada (born Keith Gordon Ham), Hare Krishna guru
- Herb Trimpe, a longtime Marvel Comics artist (The Incredible Hulk) was raised in Peekskill.
- Stanley Tucci, an actor, was born in Peekskill.

== Popular culture ==
The 1980s American sitcom The Facts of Life is about 4 young women who attend a private boarding school in Peekskill called Eastland School for Girls. Peekskill Military Academy was a real school for boys located on Oak Hill in Peekskill. It operated from 1837 to 1968.

== See also ==
- Depew Park
- Lincoln Depot Museum
- National Register of Historic Places listings in Peekskill, New York
- Peekskill Freight Depot
- Standard House
- The Waterfront
