= Rick Jackson =

American basketball player (born 1989)

Richard Kadeem Jackson
Personal information
- Born: May 26, 1989 (age 37) Philadelphia, Pennsylvania, U.S.
- Listed height: 6 ft 9 in (2.06 m)
- Listed weight: 235 lb (107 kg)

Career information
- High school: Neumann-Goretti (Philadelphia, Pennsylvania)
- College: Syracuse (2007–2011)
- NBA draft: 2011: undrafted
- Playing career: 2011–2023
- Position: Power forward / center

Career history
- 2011–2012: Chorale Roanne Basket
- 2012–2013: Austin Toros
- 2013–2014: Hapoel Gilboa Galil
- 2014: Krasny Oktyabr
- 2015: Rain or Shine Elasto Painters
- 2015: Cocodrilos de Caracas
- 2015: Iowa Energy
- 2015–2016: Delaware 87ers
- 2016: Provence
- 2017: Metropolitanos de Mauricio Baez
- 2019: Club Atlético Goes
- 2020: KB Peja
- 2022–2023: Club Atlético Olimpia
- 2023: Satria Muda Pertamina

Career highlights
- Big East Defensive Player of the Year (2011); Fourth-team Parade All-American (2007)
- Stats at Basketball Reference

Richard Kadeem Jackson (born May 26, 1989) is an American former professional basketball player. He played college basketball for Syracuse and attended Neumann-Goretti High School with former Syracuse teammate, Scoop Jardine.

== High school career ==
Jackson attended Neumann-Goretti High School, where he played with future Syracuse teammate Scoop Jardine. Neuman-Goretti won the Philadelphia Catholic League championship and was ranked No. 24 ranking in the final 2006 USA Today poll. That season, Jackson averaged 15 points per game and was named AP All-State Class AAAA second team.

=== Team USA ===
Jackson played on Team USA at the semi-annual (Under 18) Albert Schweitzer Tournament in Mannheim, Germany in 2006. He led the squad with 17.3 points, 9.6 rebounds, and 1.5 blocks per game. In the seventh-place game against host Germany, Jackson scored a game high 25 points, pulled down 11 rebounds and blocked five shots.

== College career ==
=== 2007–08 ===
Jackson appeared in all 35 of Syracuse's games in his freshman year, with averages of 3.7 points and 3.0 rebounds per game, highlighted by a seven-point, eight-rebound performance against Providence.

=== 2008–09 ===
Jackson would join the starting lineup in his sophomore season against Memphis on December 20, 2008, scoring 14 points to go along with seven rebounds. On January 14, 2009, Jackson scored 17 points to go along with seven rebounds in an 88–74 loss to Georgetown. Jackson would follow that performance up with 13 points and 10 rebounds as No. 8 Syracuse topped No. 12 Notre Dame, 93–74. Jackson was also solid defensively, helping to hold All-American Luke Harangody to 9-for-28 shooting from the floor.

=== 2009–10 ===
Jackson would continue in the starting lineup in his junior season. On December 10, 2009, Jackson scored a career high 21 points to go along with 11 rebounds against then-No. 10 Florida. Two games later, he would score 18 points and grab 10 rebounds against St. Bonaventure. For the season he averaged 9.7 points, 7.0 rebounds, 2.0 blocks, and 1.0 steals per game.

=== 2010–11 ===
Jackson, the lone Senior on the team led the Orange to a 28–7 regular season record. He was named Big East Defensive Player of the Year. Jackson finished the season leading the league in rebounds, field goal percentage and blocked shots. His rebounding numbers ranked him seventh nationally. The field goal percentage placed him 14th in the country. The blocked shots, No. 21 nationally. Jackson's 17 double-doubles ties him for eighth place on the national stage. With his production, Jackson was left off of the Big East first team and the league decided to go with six guards. Jackson wound up making the second team in the Big East.

== Professional career ==
=== 2011–12 ===
After going undrafted in the 2011 NBA draft and with the 2011 NBA Lockout preventing him from signing anywhere, Jackson signed with Chorale Roanne Basket in France.

=== 2012–13 ===
On November 8, 2012, Jackson was acquired by the Santa Cruz Warriors as an affiliate player. Then on November 27, 2012, he was traded to the Austin Toros in a three-team trade involving the Rio Grande Valley Vipers and the Warriors.

On January 27, 2013, in a game against the Rio Grande Valley Vipers, Jackson recorded a career high of 25 rebounds to go along with 21 points in a 106–91 win.

=== 2013–14 ===
On August 1, 2013, Jackson signed with Hapoel Gilboa Galil for the 2013–14 Israeli Basketball Super League season.

=== 2014–15 ===
On December 15, 2014, Jackson signed with the Russian club Krasny Oktyabr. Later that month, he left the club after appearing in only two games. On January 19, 2015, he signed with Rain or Shine Elasto Painters at the Philippines playing as import, replacing Kenny Adeleke due to problems in travel documents.

On April 11, 2015, he signed with Cocodrilos de Caracas of the Venezuelan Liga Profesional de Baloncesto.

=== 2015–16 ===
On October 31, 2015, Jackson was selected by the Iowa Energy with the ninth overall pick in the 2015 NBA Development League Draft. On November 14, he made his debut for Iowa in a 98–95 win over the Sioux Falls Skyforce, recording ten points, three rebounds, one assist and two blocks in 29 minutes.

On November 25, 2015, Jackson was traded to the Delaware 87ers in exchange for the returning player rights to Khalif Wyatt. Four days later, he made his debut for Delaware in a 125–109 win over Raptors 905, recording 13 points, seven rebounds, one assist and one block in 23 minutes off the bench. On March 26, he was waived by the 87ers.

On April 7, 2016, Jackson signed with Provence of the French LNB Pro B.

=== 2021–22 ===
On February 18, 2022, Jackson signed with Club Atlético Olimpia of the Liga Uruguaya de Básquetbol.

=== 2023 ===
On May 21, 2023, Jackson signed with Satria Muda Pertamina of the Indonesian Basketball League to replace Allen West's position in the team.

== The Basketball Tournament (TBT) ==
In the summer of 2017, Jackson, for the third year, competed in The Basketball Tournament on ESPN for Boeheim's Army. In five games, he averaged 7.4 points and 7.4 rebounds to help lead Boeheim's Army to the Semifinal Round where they fell 81–77 to the eventual champions Overseas Elite. Jackson also played for Boeheim's Army in 2016 and 2015.

== Personal ==
He is the son of Rick Jackson Sr and Joyce Thomas. He has four siblings and attended Syracuse University. He is also cousins with Juwan Campbell Jr.
