= 2009–10 Marquette Golden Eagles men's basketball team =

American college basketball season

2009–10 Marquette Golden Eagles men's basketball
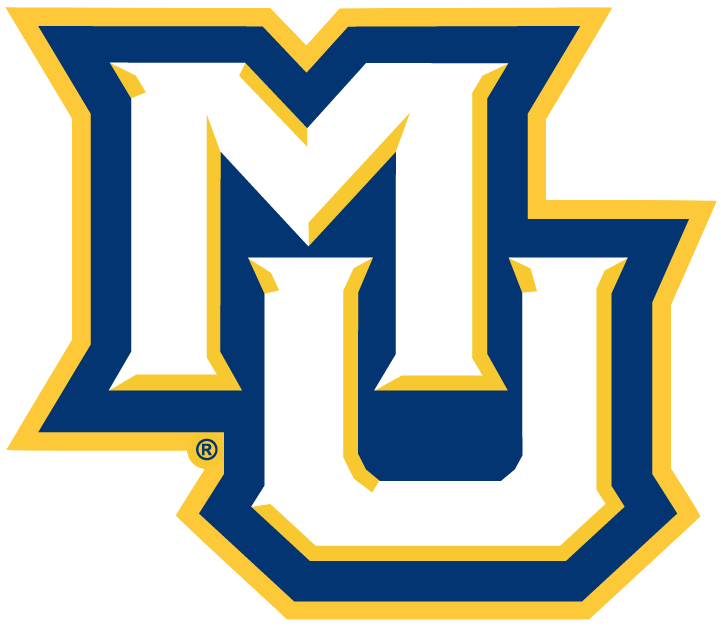

NCAA tournament, Round of 64
- Conference: Big East Conference
- Record: 22–12 (11–7 Big East)
- Head coach: Buzz Williams (2nd season)
- Assistant coaches: Tony Benford; Aki Collins; Scott Monarch
- Home arena: Bradley Center

2009–10 Big East men's basketball standings
	Conf.				Overall
Team	W		L	PCT	W		L	PCT
No. 4 Syracuse	15	–	3	.833	30	–	5	.857
No. 6 West Virginia †	13	–	5	.722	31	–	7	.816
No. 9 Villanova	13	–	5	.722	25	–	8	.758
No. 18 Pittsburgh	13	–	5	.722	25	–	9	.735
Marquette	11	–	7	.611	22	–	12	.647
Louisville	11	–	7	.611	20	–	13	.606
No. 14 Georgetown	10	–	8	.556	23	–	11	.676
Notre Dame	10	–	8	.556	23	–	12	.657
South Florida	9	–	9	.500	20	–	13	.606
Seton Hall	9	–	9	.500	19	–	13	.594
Cincinnati	7	–	11	.389	19	–	16	.543
Connecticut	7	–	11	.389	18	–	16	.529
St. John's	6	–	12	.333	17	–	16	.515
Rutgers	5	–	13	.278	15	–	17	.469
Providence	4	–	14	.222	12	–	19	.387
DePaul	1	–	17	.056	8	–	23	.258
† 2010 Big East tournament winner As of April 3, 2010; Rankings from AP Poll

The 2009–10 Marquette Golden Eagles men's basketball team represented Marquette University in the 2009–2010 NCAA Division I basketball season. Marquette was coached by Buzz Williams and played their home games at the Bradley Center in Milwaukee, WI. The Golden Eagles are members of the Big East Conference. They finished the season 22–12, 11–7 in Big East play. They advanced to the semifinals of the 2010 Big East men's basketball tournament before losing to Georgetown. They received an at–large bid to the 2010 NCAA Division I men's basketball tournament, earning a 6 seed in the East Region, where they were upset by 11 seed Washington in the first round.

== Roster ==
#	Name	Height	Weight (lbs.)	Position	Class	Hometown	Previous Team(s)
1	Darius Johnson-Odom	6'2"	200	G	So.	Raleigh, NC, U.S.	Wakefield High School HS
2	Maurice Acker	5'8"	165	G	Sr.	Hazel Crest, IL, U.S.	Hillcrest HS
5	Junior Cadougan	6'1"	205	G	Fr.	Toronto, ON, Canada	Christian Life Center Academy
10	David Cubillan	6'0"	175	G	Sr.	Maracaibo, Venezuela	Saint Benedict's Prep
12	Erik Williams	6'7"	200	F	Fr.	Houston, TX, U.S.	Cypress Springs HS
21	Joseph Fulce	6'7"	205	F	Jr.	Plano, TX, U.S.	Plano Senior HS
23	Dwight Buycks	6'3"	190	G	Jr.	Milwaukee, WI, U.S.	Bay View HS
32	Lazar Hayward	6'6"	225	F	Sr.	Buffalo, NY, U.S.	Notre Dame Prep
33	Jimmy Butler	6'6"	215	G/F	Jr.	Tomball, TX, U.S.	Tomball HS
42	Chris Otule	6'10"	250	C	So.	Richmond, TX, U.S.	Fort Bend HS
45	Robert Frozena	6'1"	190	G	Jr.	Sherwood, WI, U.S.	St. Mary Central HS
55	Youssoupha Mbao	7'2"	215	C	Fr.	Dakar, Senegal	Stoneridge Prep

== 2009-10 Schedule and results ==
- All times are Central

Date time, TV	Rank^{#}	Opponent^{#}	Result	Record	Site (attendance) city, state
Exhibition
11/7/2009*; 1:00pm		MSOE	W 106–47		Bradley Center (13,821); Milwaukee, WI
Regular Season
11/13/2009*; 7:30pm, Sports 32		Centenary	W 85–62	1–0	Bradley Center (14,093); Milwaukee, WI
11/17/2009*; 7:00pm, Sports 32		Maryland Eastern Shore	W 86–60	2–0	Bradley Center (13,511); Milwaukee, WI
11/21/2009*; 7:30pm, Sports 32		Grambling State	W 87–41	3–0	Bradley Center (13,716); Milwaukee, WI
11/24/2009*; 7:00pm, Sports 32/Big East Network		South Dakota	W 93–68	4–0	Bradley Center (13,731); Milwaukee, WI
11/26/2009*; 1:00pm, ESPN2		vs. Xavier; Old Spice Classic	W 71–61	5–0	Milk House (2,853); Lake Buena Vista, FL
11/27/2009*; 11:00am, ESPN		vs. No. 15 Michigan; Old Spice Classic	W 79–65	6–0	Milk House (3,660); Lake Buena Vista, FL
11/29/2009*; 7:00pm, ESPN2		vs. Florida State; Old Spice Classic	L 57–56	6–1	Milk House (2,225); Lake Buena Vista, FL
12/5/2009*; 2:00pm, Sports 32/Big East Network		NC State	L 77–73	6–2	Bradley Center (15,803); Milwaukee, WI
12/8/2009*; 7:00pm, Sports 32/Big East Network		Milwaukee	W 71–51	7–2	Bradley Center (14,244); Milwaukee, WI
12/12/2009*; 4:00pm, ESPN2		at No. 20 Wisconsin	L 72–63	7–3	Kohl Center (17,230); Madison, WI
12/19/2009*; 1:00pm, Sports 32		North Florida	W 78–51	8–3	Bradley Center (14,117); Milwaukee, WI
12/27/2009*; 1:00pm		Presbyterian	W 102–62	9–3	Bradley Center (14,321); Milwaukee, WI
12/29/2009; 6:00pm, Sports 32/Big East Network		at No. 6 West Virginia	L 63–62	9–4 (0–1)	WVU Coliseum (12,872); Morgantown, WV
1/2/2010; 2:30pm, ESPN2		No. 8 Villanova	L 74–72	9–5 (0–2)	Bradley Center (18,093); Milwaukee, WI
1/6/2010; 7:00pm, Sports 32/Big East Network		No. 12 Georgetown	W 62–59	10–5 (1–2)	Bradley Center (15,984); Milwaukee, WI
1/9/2010; 1:00pm, Sports 32/Big East Network		at No. 6 Villanova	L 78–76	10–6 (1–3)	The Pavilion (6,500); Villanova, PA
1/17/2010; 3:00pm, Big East Network/WMLW-CA		Providence	W 93–63	11–6 (2–3)	Bradley Center (16,154); Milwaukee, WI
1/20/2010; 8:00pm, Big East Network/WMLW-CA		at DePaul	L 51–50	11–7 (2–4)	Allstate Arena (10,115); Rosemont, IL
1/23/2010; 1:00pm, ESPNU		at No. 5 Syracuse	L 76–71	11–8 (2–5)	Carrier Dome (29,011); Syracuse, NY
1/26/2010; 8:00pm, ESPNU		Rutgers	W 82–59	12–8 (3–5)	Bradley Center (16,793); Milwaukee, WI
1/30/2010; 11:00am, Big East Network/WMLW-CA		at No. 19 Connecticut	W 70–68	13–8 (4–5)	XL Center (14,338); Hartford, CT
2/3/2010; 6:00pm, ESPN2		DePaul	W 80–69	14–8 (5–5)	Bradley Center (15,151); Milwaukee, WI
2/6/2010; 11:00am, Big East Network/WMLW-CA		at Providence	W 82–79	15–8 (6–5)	Dunkin' Donuts Center (12,061); Providence, RI
2/13/2010; 7:30pm, Sports 32/Big East Network		South Florida	W 63–52	16–8 (7–5)	Bradley Center (18,064); Milwaukee, WI
2/18/2010; 8:00pm, ESPN2		No. 19 Pittsburgh	L 58–51	16–9 (7–6)	Bradley Center (16,486); Milwaukee, WI
2/21/2010; 7:00pm, Big East Network/WMLW-CA		at Cincinnati	W 79–76 ^{OT}	17–9 (8–6)	Fifth Third Arena (10,192); Cincinnati, OH
2/24/2010; 6:30pm, Big East Network/WMLW-CA		at St. John's	W 63–61 ^{OT}	18–9 (9–6)	Carnesecca Arena (4,424); Queens, NY
2/28/2010; 11:00am, Sports 32/Big East Network		at Seton Hall	W 84–83 ^{OT}	19–9 (10–6)	Prudential Center (9,475); Newark, NJ
3/2/2010; 7:00pm, ESPNU		Louisville	W 69–48	20–9 (11–6)	Bradley Center (16,281); Milwaukee, WI
3/6/2010; 1:00pm, Sports 32/Big East Network		Notre Dame	L 60–63	20–10 (11–7)	Bradley Center (18,942); Milwaukee, WI
Big East tournament
3/10/2010; 1:30pm, ESPN		vs. St. John's; First Round	W 57–55	21–10	Madison Square Garden (19,375); New York, NY
3/11/2010; 1:30pm, ESPN		vs. No. 10 Villanova; Quarterfinals	W 80–76	22–10	Madison Square Garden (19,375); New York, NY
3/12/2010; 6:00pm, ESPN		vs. No. 22 Georgetown; Semifinals	L 57–80	22–11	Madison Square Garden (19,375); New York, NY
2010 NCAA Division I men's basketball tournament
3/18/2010; 6:20pm, CBS		vs. Washington; First round	L 78–80	22–12	HP Pavilion (NA); San Jose, CA
*Non-conference game. ^{#}Rankings from AP Poll. (#) Tournament seedings in parentheses.

== See also ==
- 2009-10 Big East Conference men's basketball season
- 2010 NCAA Division I men's basketball tournament
- Marquette Golden Eagles men's basketball
