= 2009–10 South Florida Bulls men's basketball team =

American college basketball season

2009–10 South Florida Bulls men's basketball

NIT, First Round
- Conference: Big East Conference
- Record: 20–13 (9–9 Big East)
- Head coach: Stan Heath
- Assistant coaches: Jeremy Cox; Reggie Hanson; Eric Skeeters
- Home arena: USF Sun Dome

2009–10 Big East men's basketball standings
	Conf.				Overall
Team	W		L	PCT	W		L	PCT
No. 4 Syracuse	15	–	3	.833	30	–	5	.857
No. 6 West Virginia †	13	–	5	.722	31	–	7	.816
No. 9 Villanova	13	–	5	.722	25	–	8	.758
No. 18 Pittsburgh	13	–	5	.722	25	–	9	.735
Marquette	11	–	7	.611	22	–	12	.647
Louisville	11	–	7	.611	20	–	13	.606
No. 14 Georgetown	10	–	8	.556	23	–	11	.676
Notre Dame	10	–	8	.556	23	–	12	.657
South Florida	9	–	9	.500	20	–	13	.606
Seton Hall	9	–	9	.500	19	–	13	.594
Cincinnati	7	–	11	.389	19	–	16	.543
Connecticut	7	–	11	.389	18	–	16	.529
St. John's	6	–	12	.333	17	–	16	.515
Rutgers	5	–	13	.278	15	–	17	.469
Providence	4	–	14	.222	12	–	19	.387
DePaul	1	–	17	.056	8	–	23	.258
† 2010 Big East tournament winner As of April 3, 2010; Rankings from AP Poll

The 2009–10 South Florida Bulls men's basketball team represented the University of South Florida Bulls during the 2009–10 NCAA Division I men's basketball season. The team was coached by Stan Heath in his third year at the school. USF played its home games in the USF Sun Dome and is a member of the Big East Conference. The Bulls finished the season 20–13, 9–9 in Big East play. They lost in the second round of the 2010 Big East men's basketball tournament to Georgetown and were invited to play in the 2010 National Invitation Tournament where they lost in the first round to North Carolina State.

In the Week 13 poll released on February 8, USF received two AP Poll votes (unofficially ranking them 44th), marking the first time in school history that the USF men’s basketball team has received votes in any rankings polls.

== Roster ==
Name	#	Position	Height	Weight	Year	Former school	Hometown
Ron Anderson	1	Forward	6–8	255	RS Junior	Kansas State / McCallie School	Upper Marlboro, MD
Mike Burwell	23	Guard	6–6	210	Freshman	South Kent School / Cardinal McCarrick HS	East Brunswick, NJ
Anthony Crater	10	Guard	6–1	170	Sophomore	Ohio State University / Brewster Academy	Flint, MI
B. J. Daniels	2	Guard	6–1	212	Sophomore	Lincoln HS	Tallahassee, FL
Jordan Dumars	4	Guard	6–5	225	Freshman	Detroit Country Day School	Detroit, MI
Jarrid Famous	31	Forward/Center	6–11	240	Junior	Westchester Community College / Blessed Sacrament HS	Bronx, NY
Toarlyn Fitzpatrick	32	Forward	6–8	230	Freshman	King HS	Tampa, FL
Augustus Gilchrist	24	Forward/Center	6–10	245	Sophomore	Maryland / Academy	Clinton, MD
Chris Howard	3	Guard	6–3	200	Senior	Friendly HS	Fort Washington, MD
Dominique Jones	20	Guard	6–4	215	Junior	Lake Wales HS	Lake Wales, FL
Ryan Kardok	13	Guard	6–3	188	Senior	Broward Community College / Stoneman Douglas HS	Parkland, FL
Justin Leemow	5	Guard	6–1	180	Sophomore	Mt. Zion Christian Academy	Brooklyn, NY
Mike Mercer	33	Guard	6–5	195	Senior	Georgia / South Gwinnett HS	Snellville, GA
Shaun Noriega	22	Guard	6–4	195	Freshman	North Port HS	North Port, FL
Alex Rivas	11	Center	6–10	230	Senior	Pratt Community College / Laurinburg Prep	Santiago, Dominican Republic

== Schedule and results ==
Date time, TV	Rank^{#}	Opponent^{#}	Result	Record	Site city, state
Exhibition
November 3, 2009*; 7:00 p.m.		Florida Southern	W 110–79		USF Sun Dome; Tampa, FL
Non-conference regular season
November 13*; 8:30 p.m.		at Southern Methodist	W 67–61	1–0	Moody Coliseum; Dallas, TX
November 16*; 7:30 p.m., BHSN		Virginia	W 66–49	2–0	USF Sun Dome; Tampa, FL
November 19*; 7:00 p.m.		vs. Davidson; Charleston Classic	W 65–58	3–0	Carolina First Arena; Charleston, SC
November 20*; 9:30 p.m.		vs. South Carolina; Charleston Classic	L 66–69	3–1	Carolina First Arena; Charleston, SC
November 22*; 3:30 p.m.		vs. UNC-Wilmington; Charleston Classic	W 74–66	4–1	Carolina First Arena; Charleston, SC
November 25*; 7:00 p.m.		Kent State	W 76–54	5–1	USF Sun Dome; Tampa, FL
November 27*; 7:00 p.m.		Florida Atlantic	W 78–58	6–1	USF Sun Dome; Tampa, FL
December 2*; 7:00 p.m.		Hampton	W 74–55	7–1	USF Sun Dome; Tampa, FL
December 13*; 2:00 p.m.		Central Michigan	L 56–59	7–2	USF Sun Dome; Tampa, FL
December 16*; 7:00 p.m., BHSN		Central Florida	W 69–65	8–2	USF Sun Dome; Tampa, FL
December 19*; 5:00 p.m.		vs. San Francisco; Las Vegas Holiday Hoops Classic	W 69–49	9–2	South Point Events Center; Las Vegas, NV
December 20*; 5:00 p.m.		vs. San Diego; Las Vegas Holiday Hoops Classic	W 69–60	10–2	South Point Events Center; Las Vegas, NV
Big East regular season
December 30; 7:00 p.m., BHSN		at Louisville	L 52–73	10–3 (0–1)	Freedom Hall; Louisville, KY
January 5, 2010; 7:00 p.m., ESPNU		Notre Dame	L 73–74	10–4 (0–2)	USF Sun Dome; Tampa, FL
January 10; 2:00 p.m., BHSN		at No. 7 Syracuse	L 65–82	10–5 (0–3)	Carrier Dome; Syracuse, NY
January 13; 7:00 p.m., BHSN		No. 10 West Virginia	L 69–50	10–6 (0–4)	USF Sun Dome; Tampa, FL
January 16; 7:00 p.m., ESPN360		Rutgers	W 73–64	11–6 (1–4)	USF Sun Dome; Tampa, FL
January 20; 7:00 p.m., ESPN2		at Cincinnati	L 70–78	11–7 (1–5)	Fifth Third Arena; Cincinnati, OH
January 23; 8:00 p.m., ESPNU		at Providence	W 109–105 ^{OT}	12–7 (2–5)	Dunkin' Donuts Center; Providence, RI
January 28; 7:00 p.m., ESPN2		Seton Hall	W 76–74 ^{OT}	13–7 (3–5)	USF Sun Dome; Tampa, FL
January 31; 1:00 p.m., BHSN		No. 17 Pittsburgh	W 70–61	14–7 (4–5)	USF Sun Dome; Tampa, FL
February 3; 7:00 p.m., BHSN		at No. 7 Georgetown	W 72–64	15–7 (5–5)	Verizon Center; Washington, D.C.
February 7; 12:00 p.m., WFTS-Tampa		at Notre Dame	L 62–65	15–8 (5–6)	Joyce Center; Notre Dame, IN
February 13; 8:30 p.m., BHSN		at Marquette	L 52–63	15–9 (5–7)	Bradley Center; Milwaukee, WI
February 16; 7:00 p.m., ESPNU		Cincinnati	W 65–57	16–9 (6–7)	USF Sun Dome; Tampa, FL
February 20; 12:00 p.m., BHSN		St. John's	L 58–74	16–10 (6–8)	USF Sun Dome; Tampa, FL
February 24; 9:00 p.m., BHSN		at No. 7 Villanova	L 49–74	16–11 (6–9)	The Pavilion; Villanova, PA
February 27; 7:00 p.m., ESPN360		Providence	W 99–93	17–11 (7–9)	USF Sun Dome; Tampa, FL
March 2; 7:30 p.m., ESPNU		at DePaul	W 63–59	18–11 (8–9)	Allstate Arena; Chicago, IL
March 6; 2:00 p.m., BHSN		Connecticut	W 75–68	19–11 (9–9)	USF Sun Dome; Tampa, FL
Big East tournament
March 9; 12:00 p.m., ESPN2	(9)	vs. (16) DePaul; First Round	W 58–49	20–11	Madison Square Garden; New York, NY
March 10; 12:00 p.m., ESPN	(9)	vs. (8) No. 22 Georgetown; Second Round	L 49–69	20–12	Madison Square Garden; New York, NY
NIT
March 16; 8:00 p.m., ESPNU	(3)	(6) NC State; First Round	L 57–58	20–13	USF Sun Dome; Tampa, FL
*Non-conference game. ^{#}Rankings from AP Poll. (#) Tournament seedings in parentheses.

== Rankings ==
Ranking movements Legend: ██ Increase in ranking ██ Decrease in ranking — = Not ranked RV = Received votes
	Week																			
Poll	Pre	1	2	3	4	5	6	7	8	9	10	11	12	13	14	15	16	17	18	Final
AP	—	—	—	—	—	—	—	—	—	—	—	—	—	RV	—	—	—	—	—	Not released
Coaches	—	—	—	—	—	—	—	—	—	—	—	—	—	—	—	—	—	—	—	—
