= 2009–10 Louisville Cardinals men's basketball team =

American college basketball season

2009–10 Louisville Cardinals men's basketball

NCAA tournament, Round of 64
- Conference: Big East Conference
- Record: 20–13 (11–7 Big East)
- Head coach: Rick Pitino (9th season)
- Assistant coaches: Ralph Willard; Steve Masiello; Walter McCarty
- Home arena: Freedom Hall

2009–10 Big East men's basketball standings
	Conf.				Overall
Team	W		L	PCT	W		L	PCT
No. 4 Syracuse	15	–	3	.833	30	–	5	.857
No. 6 West Virginia †	13	–	5	.722	31	–	7	.816
No. 9 Villanova	13	–	5	.722	25	–	8	.758
No. 18 Pittsburgh	13	–	5	.722	25	–	9	.735
Marquette	11	–	7	.611	22	–	12	.647
Louisville	11	–	7	.611	20	–	13	.606
No. 14 Georgetown	10	–	8	.556	23	–	11	.676
Notre Dame	10	–	8	.556	23	–	12	.657
South Florida	9	–	9	.500	20	–	13	.606
Seton Hall	9	–	9	.500	19	–	13	.594
Cincinnati	7	–	11	.389	19	–	16	.543
Connecticut	7	–	11	.389	18	–	16	.529
St. John's	6	–	12	.333	17	–	16	.515
Rutgers	5	–	13	.278	15	–	17	.469
Providence	4	–	14	.222	12	–	19	.387
DePaul	1	–	17	.056	8	–	23	.258
† 2010 Big East tournament winner As of April 3, 2010; Rankings from AP Poll

The 2009–10 Louisville Cardinals men's basketball team represented the University of Louisville during the 2009–10 NCAA Division I men's basketball season, Louisville's 96th season of intercollegiate competition. The Cardinals competed in the Big East Conference and were coached by Rick Pitino, who was in his ninth season. The team played its home games on Denny Crum Court at Freedom Hall, the final season before moving to the KFC Yum! Center.

The Cardinals finished the season 20–13, 11–7 in Big East play (3rd-T) and lost in the second round of the 2010 Big East men's basketball tournament. They received an at-large bid to the 2010 NCAA Division I men's basketball tournament, earning a 9 seed in the South Region where they lost to 8 seed California in the second round.

== Preseason ==
=== Departures ===
Name	Number	Pos.	Height	Weight	Year	Hometown	Notes
Earl Clark	5	F	6'9"	220	Junior	Plainfield, New Jersey	Entered 2009 NBA draft
Andre McGee	33	G	5'10"	180	Senior	Moreno Valley, California	Graduated
Will Scott	20	G	6'3"	185	Senior	New York, New York	Graduated
Terrence Williams	1	F	6'6"	215	Senior	Seattle, Washington	Entered 2009 NBA draft

=== Class of 2009 signees ===
College recruiting information
Name	Hometown	School	Height	Weight	Commit date
Rakeem Buckles; PF	Miami, FL	Monsignor Pace High School (FL)	6 ft 8 in (2.03 m)	200 lb (91 kg)	Feb 25, 2008
Rakeem Buckles; PF	Recruit ratings: Scout: Rivals: (91)				
Mike Marra; SG	Smithfield, RI	Northfield Mt. Hermon High School (MA)	6 ft 4 in (1.93 m)	200 lb (91 kg)	Feb 21, 2008
Mike Marra; SG	Recruit ratings: Scout: Rivals: (88)				
Peyton Siva; PG	Seattle, WA	Franklin High School (WA)	6 ft 0 in (1.83 m)	165 lb (75 kg)	May 16, 2008
Peyton Siva; PG	Recruit ratings: Scout: Rivals: (96)				
Stephan Van Treese; PF	Indianapolis, IN	Lawrence North High School (IN)	6 ft 8 in (2.03 m)	220 lb (100 kg)	Sep 16, 2008
Stephan Van Treese; PF	Recruit ratings: Scout: Rivals: (88)				
Overall recruit ranking: Scout: 21 Rivals: 16 ESPN: 17
Note: In many cases, Scout, Rivals, 247Sports, On3, and ESPN may conflict in their listings of height and weight.; In these cases, the average was taken. ESPN grades are on a 100-point scale.; Sources: "Louisville Basketball Commitment List". Rivals.; "2009 Louisville Basketball Commitment List". Scout.; "ESPN". ESPN.; "Scout.com Team Recruiting Rankings". Scout.; "2009 Team Ranking". Rivals.

== Roster ==
Name	#	Position	Height	Weight	Year	Former School	Hometown
Chris Brickley	11	Guard	6–4	175	Senior	Northeastern University	Manchester, NH
Rakeem Buckles	4	Forward	6–8	200	Freshman	Pace	Miami, FL
Reginald Delk	12	Guard	6–4	175	Senior	Mississippi State University	Jackson, TN
George Goode	22	Guard	6–8	205	Sophomore	Raytown South	Raytown, MO
Terrence Jennings	23	Forward	6–10	225	Sophomore	Notre Dame Prep	Sacramento, CA
Preston Knowles	2	Guard	6–1	170	Junior	George Rogers Clark	Winchester, KY
Kyle Kuric	14	Guard	6–4	175	Sophomore	Reitz Memorial	Evansville, IN
Mike Marra	33	Guard	6–4	190	Freshman	Northfield Mt. Hermon	Esmond, RI
Samardo Samuels	15	Forward	6–8	240	Sophomore	St. Benedict	Trelawny, Jamaica
Peyton Siva	3	Guard	5–10	165	Freshman	Franklin	Seattle, WA
Chris Smith	5	Guard	6–3	21-	Junior (Redshirt)	Manhattan	Newark, NJ
Jerry Smith	34	Guard	6–1	200	Senior	East	Wauwatosa, WI
Edgar Sosa	10	Guard	6–1	200	Senior	Rice	Bronx, NY
Jared Swopshire	21	Forward	6–7	215	Sophomore	IMG Academy	St. Louis, MO
Stephan Van Treese	44	Forward	6–8	220	Freshman	Lawrence North	Indianapolis, IN
Richie Phares	32	Forward	6–9	210	Freshman	Scott County	Georgetown, KY

== Schedule ==
Date time, TV	Rank^{#}	Opponent^{#}	Result	Record	Site (attendance) city, state
November 17, 2009*; 7:30 p.m., ESPN2	No. 20	vs. Arkansas; Hall of Fame Showcase	W 96–66	1–0	Scottrade Center (12,017); St. Louis, MO
November 21*; 4:00 p.m., WHAS/BEN/ESPN360	No. 20	East Tennessee State; Hall of Fame Showcase	W 69–56	2–0	Freedom Hall (19,179); Louisville, KY
November 22*; 1:00 p.m., WHAS/BEN/ESPN360	No. 20	Morgan State; Hall of Fame Showcase	W 90–81	3–0	Freedom Hall (18,942); Louisville, KY
November 23*; 7:00 p.m., WHAS/BEN/ESPN360	No. 16	Appalachian State; Hall of Fame Showcase	W 80–53	4–0	Freedom Hall (19,027); Louisville, KY
November 28*; 4:00 p.m., Versus	No. 16	at UNLV	L 71–76	4–1	Thomas & Mack Center (14,390); Paradise, NV
December 2*; 7:00 p.m., WHAS/ESPN Full Court	No. 20	Stetson	W 80–48	5–1	Freedom Hall (18,916); Louisville, KY
December 5*; 7:00 p.m., ESPNU	No. 20	Charlotte	L 65–87	5–2	Freedom Hall (19,221); Louisville, KY
December 12*; 4:00 p.m., WHAS/ESPN Full Court		Western Carolina	L 83–91	5–3	Freedom Hall (19,247); Louisville, KY
December 16*; 7:00 p.m., WHAS/ESPN Full Court		Oral Roberts	W 94–57	6–3	Freedom Hall (18,868); Louisville, KY
December 19*; 4:00 p.m., ESPN2		Western Kentucky; Billy Minardi Classic	W 102–75	7–3	Freedom Hall (19,531); Louisville, KY
December 23*; 7:00 p.m., WHAS/ESPN Full Court		Louisiana–Lafayette	W 84–69	8–3	Freedom Hall (18,894); Louisville, KY
December 27*; 1:00 p.m., WHAS/ESPN Full Court		Radford	W 79–53	9–3	Freedom Hall (19,265); Louisville, KY
December 30; 7:00 p.m., WHAS/BEN/ESPN Full Court		South Florida	W 73–52	10–3 (1–0)	Freedom Hall (19,386); Louisville, KY
January 2*; 3:30 p.m., CBS		at No. 3 Kentucky; Battle for the Bluegrass	L 62–71	10–4 (1–0)	Rupp Arena (24,479); Lexington, KY
January 6; 7:00 p.m., ESPNU		at Providence	W 92–70	11–4 (2–0)	Dunkin' Donuts Center (9,207); Providence, RI
January 9; 12:00 p.m., WHAS/BEN/ESPN Full Court		St. Johns	W 75–68	12–4 (3–0)	Freedom Hall (19,263); Louisville, KY
January 11; 7:00 p.m., ESPN		No. 4 Villanova	L 84–92	12–5 (3–1)	Freedom Hall (20,076); Louisville, KY
January 16; 12:00 p.m., WHAS/BEN/ESPN Full Court		at No. 16 Pittsburgh	L 77–82 ^{OT}	12–6 (3–2)	Petersen Events Center (12,781); Pittsburgh, PA
January 21; 7:00 p.m., ESPN		at Seton Hall	L 77–80	12–7 (3–3)	Prudential Center (7,139); Newark, NJ
January 24; 12:00 p.m., WHAS/BEN/ESPN Full Court		Cincinnati	W 68–60	13–7 (4–3)	Freedom Hall (19,617); Louisville, KY
January 30; 12:00 p.m., ESPN		at No. 9 West Virginia	L 74–77	13–8 (4–4)	WVU Coliseum (12,471); Morgantown, WV
February 1; 7:00 p.m., ESPN		Connecticut	W 82–69	14–8 (5–4)	Freedom Hall (19,655); Louisville, KY
February 6; 4:00 p.m., WHAS/BEN/ESPN Full Court		Rutgers	W 76–60	15–8 (6–4)	Freedom Hall (19,775); Louisville, KY
February 11; 4:00 p.m., ESPN2		at St. John's	L 55–74	15–9 (6–5)	Madison Square Garden (5,748); New York, NY
February 14; 1:00 p.m., ESPN		at No. 2 Syracuse	W 66–60	16–9 (7–5)	Carrier Dome (31,053); Syracuse, NY
February 17; 7:00 p.m., ESPN2		Notre Dame	W 91–89 ^{2OT}	17–9 (8–5)	Freedom Hall (19,623); Louisville, KY
February 20; 2:00 p.m., ESPNU		at DePaul	W 68–59	18–9 (9–5)	Allstate Arena (13,754); Rosemont, IL
February 23; 7:00 p.m., ESPN2		No. 11 Georgetown	L 60–70	18–10 (9–6)	Freedom Hall (19,917); Louisville, KY
February 28; 2:00 p.m., CBS		at Connecticut	W 78–76	19–10 (10–6)	Gampel Pavilion (10,167); Storrs, CT
March 2; 9:30 p.m., ESPNU		at Marquette	L 48–69	19–11 (10–7)	Bradley Center (16,281); Milwaukee, WI
March 6; 2:00 p.m., ESPN		No. 1 Syracuse; Freedom Hall Finale	W 78–68	20–11 (11–7)	Freedom Hall (20,135); Louisville, KY
Big East tournament
March 10; 9:00 p.m., ESPN	(6)	vs. (11) Cincinnati; Second Round	L 66–69	20–12	Madison Square Garden (19,375); New York, NY
NCAA tournament
March 19*; 9:45 p.m., CBS	(9)	vs. (8) California; First Round	L 62–77	20–13	Jacksonville Veterans Memorial Arena (12,251); Jacksonville, FL
*Non-conference game. ^{#}Rankings from AP Poll. (#) Tournament seedings in parentheses.
