= 2009–10 Cincinnati Bearcats men's basketball team =

American college basketball season

2009–10 Cincinnati Bearcats men's basketball

NIT, Second Round
- Conference: Big East Conference (1979–2013)
- Record: 19–16 (7–11 Big East)
- Head coach: Mick Cronin (4th season)
- Assistant coaches: Larry Davis (4th season); George Jackson (1st season); Tony Stubblefield (4th season)

2009–10 Big East men's basketball standings
| | Conf. | | | | Overall |
| Team | W | | L | PCT | W | | L | PCT |
|---|---|---|---|---|---|---|---|---|
| No. 4 Syracuse | 15 | – | 3 | .833 | 30 | – | 5 | .857 |
| No. 6 West Virginia † | 13 | – | 5 | .722 | 31 | – | 7 | .816 |
| No. 9 Villanova | 13 | – | 5 | .722 | 25 | – | 8 | .758 |
| No. 18 Pittsburgh | 13 | – | 5 | .722 | 25 | – | 9 | .735 |
| Marquette | 11 | – | 7 | .611 | 22 | – | 12 | .647 |
| Louisville | 11 | – | 7 | .611 | 20 | – | 13 | .606 |
| No. 14 Georgetown | 10 | – | 8 | .556 | 23 | – | 11 | .676 |
| Notre Dame | 10 | – | 8 | .556 | 23 | – | 12 | .657 |
| South Florida | 9 | – | 9 | .500 | 20 | – | 13 | .606 |
| Seton Hall | 9 | – | 9 | .500 | 19 | – | 13 | .594 |
| Cincinnati | 7 | – | 11 | .389 | 19 | – | 16 | .543 |
| Connecticut | 7 | – | 11 | .389 | 18 | – | 16 | .529 |
| St. John's | 6 | – | 12 | .333 | 17 | – | 16 | .515 |
| Rutgers | 5 | – | 13 | .278 | 15 | – | 17 | .469 |
| Providence | 4 | – | 14 | .222 | 12 | – | 19 | .387 |
| DePaul | 1 | – | 17 | .056 | 8 | – | 23 | .258 |
† 2010 Big East tournament winner As of April 3, 2010; Rankings from AP Poll

The 2009–10 Cincinnati Bearcats men's basketball team represented the University of Cincinnati during the 2009–10 NCAA Division I men's basketball season. The team played its home games in Cincinnati, Ohio at the Fifth Third Arena, which has a capacity of 13,176. They are members of the Big East Conference. The Bearcats finished the season 19–16, 7–11 in Big East play and advanced to the quarterfinals of the 2010 Big East men's basketball tournament before losing to eventual champion West Virginia. They were invited to the 2010 National Invitation Tournament where they advanced to the second round before falling to Dayton.

== Offseason ==
=== Departing players ===
| Name | Number | Pos. | Height | Weight | Year | Hometown | Notes |
|---|---|---|---|---|---|---|---|
| Brandon Miller | 20 | G | 6'4" | 195 | Senior | Cincinnati, Ohio | Walk-on; graduated |
| Mike Williams | 21 | F | 6'7" | 240 | Senior | Camden, Alabama | Graduated |
| Alvin Mitchell | 23 | F | 6'5" | 210 | Freshman | Ft. Lauderdale, Florida | Transferred to Mountain State University |
| Kenny Belton | 32 | F | 6'8" | 225 | Sophomore | Salem, Virginia | Left team due to injury |

=== Incoming transfers ===
| Name | Pos. | Height | Weight | Year | Hometown | Notes |
|---|---|---|---|---|---|---|
| Eddie Tyree | G | 5'10" | 180 | Junior | Columbus, OH | Walk-on; transferred from Thomas More. |
| Ibrahima Thomas | F | 6'11" | 235 | Junior | Dakar, Senegal | Transferred from Oklahoma State during the 2008–09 season. Thomas will have two years of eligibility remaining after sitting out the first seven games of the 2009–10 season. |

=== Recruiting class of 2009 ===
College recruiting information
| Name | Hometown | School | Height | Weight | Commit date |
|---|---|---|---|---|---|
| Sean Kilpatrick; SG | White Plains, New York | Notre Dame Prep | 6 ft 4 in (1.93 m) | 210 lb (95 kg) | |
| Sean Kilpatrick; SG | Recruit ratings: Scout: Rivals: 247Sports: (87) | | | | |
| JaQuon Parker; PG | Suffolk, Virginia | King's Fork High School | 6 ft 4 in (1.93 m) | 200 lb (91 kg) | Jun 2, 2009 |
| JaQuon Parker; PG | Recruit ratings: Scout: Rivals: 247Sports: (89) | | | | |
| Lance Stephenson; G | Brooklyn, New York | Abraham Lincoln High School | 6 ft 6 in (1.98 m) | 195 lb (88 kg) | Jun 30, 2009 |
| Lance Stephenson; G | Recruit ratings: Scout: Rivals: 247Sports: (97) | | | | |
Overall recruit ranking: 247Sports: 45
Note: In many cases, Scout, Rivals, 247Sports, On3, and ESPN may conflict in their listings of height and weight.; In these cases, the average was taken. ESPN grades are on a 100-point scale.; Sources: "Cincinnati 2009 Player Commits". ESPN.; "2009 Team Ranking". Rivals.

=== Recruiting class of 2010 ===
College recruiting information (2010)
| Name | Hometown | School | Height | Weight | Commit date |
|---|---|---|---|---|---|
| Justin Jackson; F | Cocoa Beach, Florida | Arlington Country Day School | 6 ft 8 in (2.03 m) | 220 lb (100 kg) | Aug 27, 2009 |
| Justin Jackson; F | Recruit ratings: Scout: Rivals: 247Sports: (94) | | | | |
| Kelvin Gaines; F | Ocala, Florida | Arlington Country Day School | 6 ft 10 in (2.08 m) | 225 lb (102 kg) | Nov 17, 2009 |
| Kelvin Gaines; F | Recruit ratings: Scout: Rivals: 247Sports: (90) | | | | |
Overall recruit ranking: 247Sports: 86
Note: In many cases, Scout, Rivals, 247Sports, On3, and ESPN may conflict in their listings of height and weight.; In these cases, the average was taken. ESPN grades are on a 100-point scale.; Sources: "Cincinnati 2010 Player Commits". ESPN.; "2010 Team Ranking". Rivals.

== Roster ==
2009–10 Cincinnati Bearcats men's basketball team
Players
Coaches

| Pos. | # | Name | Height | Weight | Year | Previous school | Hometown |
|---|---|---|---|---|---|---|---|
| G | 1 | Cashmere Wright | 6 ft 0 in (1.83 m) | 175 lb (79 kg) | RS Fr | Urban Christian Academy | Savannah, Georgia |
| G | 2 | Eddie Tyree (W) | 5 ft 10 in (1.78 m) | 180 lb (82 kg) | Jr | Thomas More | Columbus, Ohio |
| G | 3 | Dion Dixon | 6 ft 3 in (1.91 m) | 195 lb (88 kg) | So | Crane High School | Chicago, Illinois |
| G | 5 | Deonta Vaughn (C) | 6 ft 1 in (1.85 m) | 190 lb (86 kg) | Sr | Harmony Community School | Indianapolis, Indiana |
| G | 10 | Alex Eppensteiner (W) | 6 ft 3 in (1.91 m) | 210 lb (95 kg) | Fr | Elder High School | Cincinnati, Ohio |
| G | 11 | Larry Davis | 6 ft 3 in (1.91 m) | 185 lb (84 kg) | Jr | Alief Hastings High School | Houston, Texas |
| F | 15 | Darnell Wilks | 6 ft 7 in (2.01 m) | 205 lb (93 kg) | Jr | Pioneer Christian Academy | Nashville, Tennessee |
| F | 22 | Rashad Bishop | 6 ft 6 in (1.98 m) | 220 lb (100 kg) | Jr | Kennedy High School | Paterson, New Jersey |
| G/F | 23 | Sean Kilpatrick (redshirt) | 6 ft 4 in (1.93 m) | 215 lb (98 kg) | Fr | Notre Dame Prep | White Plains, New York |
| G | 25 | Anthony McBride (W) (redshirt) | 6 ft 2 in (1.88 m) | 180 lb (82 kg) | Fr | Withrow High School | Cincinnati, Ohio |
| C | 30 | Anthony McClain | 7 ft 0 in (2.13 m) | 290 lb (132 kg) | Jr | National Christian Academy | Trenton, New Jersey |
| F | 32 | Ibrahima Thomas | 6 ft 11 in (2.11 m) | 235 lb (107 kg) | Jr | Oklahoma State | Dakar, Senegal |
| G | 33 | Lance Stephenson | 6 ft 5 in (1.96 m) | 210 lb (95 kg) | Fr | Abraham Lincoln High School | Brooklyn, New York |
| F | 34 | Yancy Gates | 6 ft 9 in (2.06 m) | 260 lb (118 kg) | So | Withrow High School | Cincinnati, Ohio |
| C | 42 | Steve Toyloy | 6 ft 8 in (2.03 m) | 255 lb (116 kg) | Sr | Palm Beach Lakes High School | West Palm Beach, Florida |
| F | 44 | JaQuon Parker | 6 ft 3 in (1.91 m) | 210 lb (95 kg) | Fr | King's Fork High School | Suffolk, Virginia |

Head coach

- Mick Cronin (Cincinnati)

Assistant coach(es)

- Larry Davis (Asbury)
- George Jackson (Wittenberg)
- Tony Stubblefield (Omaha)

Legend

- (C) Team captain
- (S) Suspended
- (I) Ineligible
- (W) Walk-on
- Injured
- Current redshirt

Roster
Last update: 2 Sep 2020

=== Depth chart ===
| Pos. | Starting 5 | Bench 1 | Bench 2 |
|---|---|---|---|
| C | Ibrahima Thomas | Steve Toyloy | Anthony McClain |
| PF | Yancy Gates | Darnell Wilks |
| SF | Rashad Bishop | JaQuon Parker | Alex Eppensteiner |
| SG | Lance Stephenson | Dion Dixon | Larry Davis |
| PG | Deonta Vaughn | Cashmere Wright | Eddie Tyree |

== Schedule and results ==
| Date time, TV | Rank^{#} | Opponent^{#} | Result | Record | Site (attendance) city, state |
Exhibition
| November 5, 2009*; 7:30pm | | Saginaw Valley State | W 86–58 | | Fifth Third Arena (6,558); Cincinnati, OH |
| November 12, 2009*; 7:30pm | | Bellarmine | W 76–69 | | Fifth Third Arena (6,653); Cincinnati, OH |
Regular Season
| November 16, 2009*; 7:30pm | | Prairie View A&M | W 69–62 | 1–0 | Fifth Third Arena (6,777); Cincinnati, OH |
| November 18, 2009*; 7:30pm, FS Ohio | | Toledo | W 92–68 | 2–0 | Fifth Third Arena (7,010); Cincinnati, OH |
| November 23, 2009*; 5:30pm, ESPN2 | | vs. No. 24 Vanderbilt; Maui Invitational | W 67–58 | 3–0 | Lahaina Civic Center (2,400); Maui, HI |
| November 24, 2009*; 7:00pm, ESPN | | vs. No. 21 Maryland; Maui Invitational | W 69–57 | 4–0 | Lahaina Civic Center (2,400); Maui, HI |
| November 25, 2009*; 10:00pm, ESPN | | vs. Gonzaga; Maui Invitational | L 61–59 ^{OT} | 4–1 | Lahaina Civic Center (2,400); Maui, HI |
| December 1, 2009*; 7:30pm, FS Ohio | No. 22 | Texas Southern | W 94–57 | 5–1 | Fifth Third Arena (6,825); Cincinnati, OH |
| December 10, 2009*; 8:30pm, ESPN2 | No. 19 | Miami (OH) | W 63–59 | 6–1 | U.S. Bank Arena (6,280); Cincinnati, OH |
| December 13, 2009*; 7:00pm, ESPNU | No. 19 | at Xavier; Crosstown Shootout | L 83–79 ^{2OT} | 6–2 | Cintas Center (10,250); Cincinnati, OH |
| December 16, 2009*; 7:00pm, CBSCS | No. 25 | at UAB | L 64–47 | 6–3 | Bartow Arena (6,939); Birmingham, AL |
| December 19, 2009*; 2:00pm, FS Ohio | No. 25 | Lipscomb | W 80–52 | 7–3 | Fifth Third Arena (6,647); Cincinnati, OH |
| December 22, 2009*; 7:30pm, FS Ohio | | Winthrop | W 74–57 | 8–3 | Fifth Third Arena (7,292); Cincinnati, OH |
| December 30, 2009; 7:00pm, ESPNU | | No. 10 Connecticut | W 71–69 | 9–3 (1–0) | Fifth Third Arena (10,409); Cincinnati, OH |
| January 2, 2010; 8:00pm, FS Ohio | | at Rutgers | W 65–58 | 10–3 (2–0) | the RAC (5,651); Piscataway, NJ |
| January 4, 2010; 7:00pm, ESPN | | No. 23 Pittsburgh | L 71–69 | 10–4 (2–1) | Fifth Third Arena (8,699); Cincinnati, OH |
| January 6, 2010*; 7:30pm, FS Ohio | | Cal State Bakersfield | W 87–58 | 11–4 | Fifth Third Arena (7,168); Cincinnati, OH |
| January 9, 2010; 6:00pm, FS Ohio | | at Seton Hall | L 83–76 | 11–5 (2–2) | Prudential Center (7,551); Newark, NJ |
| January 13, 2010; 6:00pm, ESPNU | | at St. John's | L 52–50 | 11–6 (2–3) | Madison Square Garden (7,040); New York, NY |
| January 16, 2010; 4:00pm, ESPNU | | Notre Dame | W 60–58 | 12–6 (3–3) | Fifth Third Arena (11,589); Cincinnati, OH |
| January 20, 2010; 7:00pm, ESPN2 | | South Florida | W 78–70 | 13–6 (4–3) | Fifth Third Arena (7,306); Cincinnati, OH |
| January 24, 2010; 12:00pm, FS Ohio | | at Louisville; Rivalry | L 68–60 | 13–7 (4–4) | Freedom Hall (18,617); Louisville, KY |
| January 30, 2010; 8:00pm, ESPNU | | Providence | W 92–88 | 14–7 (5–4) | Fifth Third Arena (10,045); Cincinnati, OH |
| February 4, 2010; 9:00pm, ESPN2 | | at Notre Dame | L 83–65 | 14–8 (5–5) | Edmund P. Joyce Center (8,530); Notre Dame, IN |
| February 7, 2010; 2:00pm, FS Ohio | | No. 3 Syracuse | L 71–54 | 14–9 (5–6) | Fifth Third Arena (11,045); Cincinnati, OH |
| February 13, 2010; 12:00pm, WKRC | | at Connecticut | W 60–48 | 15–9 (6–6) | XL Center (14,605); Hartford, CT |
| February 16, 2010; 7:00pm, ESPNU | | at South Florida | L 65–57 | 15–10 (6–7) | USF Sun Dome (6,607); Tampa, FL |
| February 21, 2010; 2:00pm, FS Ohio | | Marquette | L 79–76 ^{OT} | 15–11 (6–8) | Fifth Third Arena (10,192); Cincinnati, OH |
| February 24, 2010; 7:00pm, FS Ohio | | DePaul | W 74–69 | 16–11 (7–8) | Fifth Third Arena (8,111); Cincinnati, OH |
| February 27, 2010; 2:00pm, WKRC | | at No. 8 West Virginia | L 74–68 | 16–12 (7–9) | WVU Coliseum (12,598); Morgantown, WV |
| March 2, 2010; 7:00pm, ESPN2 | | No. 9 Villanova | L 77–73 | 16–13 (7–10) | Fifth Third Arena (11,076); Cincinnati, OH |
| March 6, 2010; 12:00pm, ESPN | | at No. 19 Georgetown | L 74–47 | 16–14 (7–11) | Verizon Center (17,054); Washington, D.C. |
Big East tournament
| March 9, 2010; 9:30pm, ESPNU | (11) | vs. (14) Rutgers; First Round | W 69–68 | 17–14 | Madison Square Garden (19,375); New York, NY |
| March 10, 2010; 9:30pm, ESPN | (11) | vs. (6) Louisville; Second Round/Rivalry | W 69–66 | 18–14 | Madison Square Garden (19,375); New York, NY |
| March 11, 2010; 9:30pm, ESPN | (11) | vs. (3) No. 7 West Virginia; Quarterfinals | L 54–51 | 18–15 | Madison Square Garden (19,375); New York, NY |
National Invitation Tournament
| March 17, 2010*; 7:00pm, ESPN2 | (2) | (7) Weber State; First Round | W 76–62 | 19–15 | Fifth Third Arena (2,410); Cincinnati, OH |
| March 22, 2010*; 9:00pm, ESPN | (2) | (3) Dayton; Second Round | L 81–66 | 19–16 | Fifth Third Arena (6,479); Cincinnati, OH |
*Non-conference game. ^{#}Rankings from AP Poll. (#) Tournament seedings in parentheses.

== Awards and milestones ==
=== Big East Conference honors ===
==== All-Big East Awards ====
- Rookie of the Year: Lance Stephenson

==== All-Big East Rookie Team ====
- Lance Stephenson

==== Rookie of the Week ====
- Week 1: Lance Stephenson
- Week 4: Lance Stephenson
- Week 11: Cashmere Wright
- Week 15: Lance Stephenson
- Week 16: Lance Stephenson

== Rankings ==
| Ranking Movement | Week | | | | | | | | | | | | | | | | | | | |
| Poll | Pre | 1 | 2 | 3 | 4 | 5 | 6 | 7 | 8 | 9 | 10 | 11 | 12 | 13 | 14 | 15 | 16 | 17 | 18 | Final |
|---|---|---|---|---|---|---|---|---|---|---|---|---|---|---|---|---|---|---|---|---|
| USA Today/ESPN Coaches | | | 24 | 19 | RV | | | | | | | | | | | | | | | |
| Associated Press | | | 22 | 19 | 25 | | | | | | | | | | | | | | | |

^{1 - Note that rankings above 25 are not official rankings. They are representations of ranking based on the number of points received in the weekly poll.}
