= SEC–Big East Challenge =

American college basketball conference challenge

- Conference: Big East Conference; Southeastern Conference
- League: NCAA Division I
- Founded: 2007
- Folded: 2012
- Sports fielded: College basketball
- Last champion: Big East Conference
- Most titles: Big East Conference (3)
- Broadcaster: ESPN

The SEC–Big East Challenge was an in-season NCAA Division I men's college basketball series, matching up teams from the Southeastern Conference and the original Big East Conference. The event, which was held each season from 2007 to 2012, took place in early December each year, before the start of conference play.

The original six-year contract for the series expired in 2013 and was not renewed. This was likely an effect of the 2010–13 Big East Conference realignment, which resulted in the members of the original Big East splitting up into the football-sponsoring American Athletic Conference (marketed as "The American" and the legal successor to the original Big East) and a new, non-football Big East Conference in the summer of 2013. The SEC proceeded to establish a new series with the Big 12 Conference called the Big 12/SEC Challenge.

== Format ==
Initially, each annual series included four games featuring four teams from each conference. The games were held as two double-headers in two different, typically off-campus, sites. Though most of the sites were not home arenas for the teams featured in the event, many were in the same cities as one of the participants. Madison Square Garden in New York City hosted a double-header in 2009 that featured the St. John's Red Storm, who use the Garden as their home arena for some games. In 2010, two games were held at Freedom Hall in Louisville, Kentucky, which served as the Louisville Cardinals' home arena until the KFC Yum! Center opened for the 2010–11 season. Other venues were occasional home venues for invitational participants. Villanova occasionally plays at the Wells Fargo Center in Philadelphia, where they participated in the first year of the Invitational in 2007 (when the venue was known as Wachovia Center). Pittsburgh occasionally hosts games in the Consol Energy Center since it opened in 2010, where they played in the invitational in December of that year.

Starting with the 2011–12 season, the format was changed to allow every SEC team to participate along with an equal number of Big East teams. This format featured 12 games over three days beginning on the Thursday after Thanksgiving of each year. The locations of the games were also changed; they were played at home campus sites with each conference hosting six games a year.

For the 2012 challenge, the SEC's new members Missouri and Texas A&M did not participate, while the departure of West Virginia from the Big East before the 2012–2013 season meant that only three Big East teams were excluded instead of four.

== Team records ==
In the inaugural series in 2007, the Big East won three games to the SEC's one. The two conferences tied, with each team winning two games, in 2008 and 2009. In the 2010 series, the SEC won for the first time, three games to one. In the 2011 series, the first year with 12 games, the Big East won eight games to four. In 2012, the Big East won nine games to three.

=== Southeastern Conference (15–25) ===
| Team | Won | Loss |
|---|---|---|
| Alabama Crimson Tide | 0 | 3 |
| Arkansas Razorbacks | 1 | 2 |
| Auburn Tigers | 0 | 4 |
| Florida Gators | 1 | 2 |
| Georgia Bulldogs | 0 | 3 |
| Kentucky Wildcats | 3 | 1 |
| LSU Tigers | 2 | 1 |
| Missouri Tigers | 0 | 0 |
| Mississippi State Bulldogs | 2 | 2 |
| Ole Miss Rebels | 2 | 1 |
| South Carolina Gamecocks | 1 | 2 |
| Tennessee Volunteers | 2 | 2 |
| Texas A&M Aggies | 0 | 0 |
| Vanderbilt Commodores | 1 | 2 |
| Overall | 15 | 25 |

=== Big East Conference (25–15) ===
| Team | Won | Loss |
|---|---|---|
| Cincinnati Bearcats | 3 | 0 |
| Connecticut Huskies | 1 | 1 |
| DePaul Blue Demons | 1 | 2 |
| Georgetown Hoyas | 3 | 0 |
| Louisville Cardinals | 2 | 0 |
| Marquette Golden Eagles | 0 | 2 |
| Notre Dame Fighting Irish | 1 | 1 |
| Pittsburgh Panthers | 1 | 1 |
| Providence Friars | 2 | 1 |
| Rutgers Scarlet Knights | 1 | 2 |
| Seton Hall Pirates | 1 | 2 |
| St. John's Red Storm | 2 | 1 |
| Syracuse Orange | 3 | 0 |
| South Florida Bulls | 1 | 1 |
| Villanova Wildcats | 2 | 0 |
| West Virginia Mountaineers | 1 | 1 |
| Overall | 25 | 15 |

== Results ==
=== 2007 Big East 3-1 ===
| Date | SEC team | Big East team | Location | Television | Attendance | Winner | Conference Leader |
|---|---|---|---|---|---|---|---|
| December 5 | Alabama | #4 Georgetown | BJCC Arena (Birmingham, Alabama) | ESPN | | Georgetown, 70–60 | Big East (1–0) |
| December 5 | Auburn | West Virginia | BJCC Arena (Birmingham, Alabama) | ESPN2 | 10,481 | West Virginia, 88–59 | Big East (2–0) |
| December 6 | South Carolina | Providence | Wachovia Center (Philadelphia, Pennsylvania) | ESPN2 | | South Carolina, 68–67 | Big East (2–1) |
| December 6 | LSU | #21 Villanova | Wachovia Center (Philadelphia, Pennsylvania) | ESPN | | Villanova, 68–67 | Big East (3–1) |

=== 2008 Tie 2-2 ===
| Date | SEC team | Big East team | Location | Television | Attendance | Winner | Conference Leader |
|---|---|---|---|---|---|---|---|
| December 16 | Vanderbilt | South Florida | Sommet Center (Nashville, Tennessee) | ESPN2 | | Vanderbilt, 71–52 | SEC (1–0) |
| December 16 | #19 Tennessee | #23 Marquette | Sommet Center (Nashville, Tennessee) | ESPN | | Tennessee, 80–68 | SEC (2–0) |
| December 18 | Mississippi State | Cincinnati | U.S. Bank Arena (Cincinnati, Ohio) | ESPN2 | | Cincinnati, 75–63 | SEC (2–1) |
| December 18 | Ole Miss | #9 Louisville | U.S. Bank Arena (Cincinnati, Ohio) | ESPN | 9,522 | Louisville, 77–68 | Tied (2–2) |

=== 2009 Tie 2-2 ===
| Date | SEC team | Big East team | Location | Television | Attendance | Winner | Conference Leader |
|---|---|---|---|---|---|---|---|
| December 9 | Georgia | St. John's | Madison Square Garden (New York City, New York) | ESPN2 | | St. John's, 66–56 | Big East (1–0) |
| December 9 | #4 Kentucky | #12 Connecticut | Madison Square Garden (New York City, New York) | ESPN | 15,874 | Kentucky, 64–61 | Tied (1–1) |
| December 10 | Mississippi State | DePaul | St. Pete Times Forum (Tampa, Florida) | ESPN2 | | Mississippi State, 76–45 | SEC (2–1) |
| December 10 | #11 Florida | #6 Syracuse | St. Pete Times Forum (Tampa, Florida) | ESPN | 9,353 | Syracuse, 85–73 | Tied (2–2) |

=== 2010 SEC 3-1 ===
| Date | SEC team | Big East team | Location | Television | Attendance | Winner | Conference Leader |
|---|---|---|---|---|---|---|---|
| December 8 | Arkansas | Seton Hall | Freedom Hall (Louisville, Kentucky) | ESPN2 | | Arkansas, 71–62 | SEC (1–0) |
| December 8 | #16 Kentucky | #23 Notre Dame | Freedom Hall (Louisville, Kentucky) | ESPN | | Kentucky, 72–58 | SEC (2–0) |
| December 11 | Auburn | Rutgers | CONSOL Energy Center, (Pittsburgh, Pennsylvania) | ESPN2 | | Rutgers, 63–54 | SEC (2–1) |
| December 11 | #13 Tennessee | #3 Pittsburgh | CONSOL Energy Center, (Pittsburgh, Pennsylvania) | ESPN | 15,166 | Tennessee, 83–76 | SEC (3–1) |

=== 2011 Big East 8-4 ===
| Date | Time | Big East team | SEC team | Location | Television | Attendance | Winner | Challenge Leader |
|---|---|---|---|---|---|---|---|---|
| Thurs., Dec. 1 | 7:00 PM | Providence | South Carolina | Colonial Life Arena • Columbia, South Carolina | ESPNU | 7,476 | Providence, 76–67 | Big East (1–0) |
| Thurs., Dec. 1 | 7:30 PM | St. John's | #1 Kentucky | Rupp Arena • Lexington, Kentucky | ESPN2 | 24,119 | Kentucky, 81–59 | Tie (1–1) |
| Thurs., Dec. 1 | 9:00 PM | DePaul | Ole Miss | Allstate Arena • Rosemont, Illinois | ESPNU | 7,129 | Ole Miss, 70–68 | SEC (2–1) |
| Thurs., Dec. 1 | 9:30 PM | Georgetown | #12 Alabama | Coleman Coliseum • Tuscaloosa, Alabama | ESPN2 | 15,383 | Georgetown, 57–55 | Tie (2–2) |
| Fri., Dec. 2 | 7:00 PM | #3 Syracuse | #9 Florida | Carrier Dome • Syracuse, New York | ESPN | 24,459 | Syracuse, 72–68 | Big East (3–2) |
| Fri., Dec. 2 | 7:00 PM | Cincinnati | Georgia | Stegeman Coliseum • Athens, Georgia | ESPNU | 6,796 | Cincinnati, 57–51 | Big East (4–2) |
| Fri., Dec. 2 | 9:00 PM | #6 Louisville | #19 Vanderbilt | KFC Yum! Center • Louisville, Kentucky | ESPN | 22,728 | Louisville, 62–60 OT | Big East (5–2) |
| Fri., Dec. 2 | 9:00 PM | Seton Hall | Auburn | Prudential Center • Newark, New Jersey | ESPNU | 6,591 | Seton Hall, 81–59 | Big East (6–2) |
| Sat., Dec. 3 | 3:15 PM | #10 Connecticut | Arkansas | XL Center • Hartford, Connecticut | ESPN | 14,333 | Connecticut, 75–62 | Big East (7–2) |
| Sat., Dec. 3 | 5:15 PM | #17 Pittsburgh | Tennessee | Thompson–Boling Arena • Knoxville, Tennessee | ESPN | 17,249 | Pittsburgh, 61–56 | Big East (8–2) |
| Sat., Dec. 3 | 7:00 PM | Rutgers | LSU | Louis Brown Athletic Center • Piscataway, New Jersey | ESPNU | 5,534 | LSU, 55–50 | Big East (8–3) |
| Sat., Dec. 3 | 9:00 PM | West Virginia | #21 Mississippi State | Humphrey Coliseum • Starkville, Mississippi | ESPNU | 7,529 | Mississippi State, 75–62 | Big East (8–4) |
First year that the invitational featured 12 games – All times Eastern; Notre Dame, Marquette, Villanova and South Florida did not participate for the Big East.

=== 2012 Big East 9-3 ===
| Date | Time | Big East Team | SEC Team | Location | Television | Attendance | Winner | Challenge Leader |
|---|---|---|---|---|---|---|---|---|
| Thurs, Nov. 29 | 7:00 pm | Notre Dame | #8 Kentucky | Edmund P. Joyce Center • South Bend, Indiana | ESPN2 | 9,149 | Notre Dame, 64–50 | Big East (1–0) |
| Thurs, Nov. 29 | 7:30 pm | St. John's | South Carolina | Carnesecca Arena • Queens, New York | ESPNU | 4,902 | St. John's, 89–65 | Big East (2–0) |
| Thurs, Nov. 29 | 9:00 pm | Marquette | #7 Florida | O'Connell Center • Gainesville, Florida | ESPN2 | 10,245 | Florida, 82–49 | Big East (2–1) |
| Thurs, Nov. 29 | 9:30 pm | Seton Hall | LSU | Pete Maravich Assembly Center • Baton Rouge, Louisiana | ESPNU | 7,295 | LSU, 72–67 | Tied (2–2) |
| Fri, Nov. 30 | 6:30 pm | #20 Georgetown | Tennessee | Verizon Center • Washington, D.C. | ESPN | 13,656 | Georgetown, 37–36 | Big East (3–2) |
| Fri, Nov. 30 | 7:00 pm | South Florida | Georgia | USF Sun Dome • Tampa, Florida | ESPNU | 5,167 | South Florida, 64–53 | Big East (4–2) |
| Fri, Nov. 30 | 8:30 pm | #6 Syracuse | Arkansas | Bud Walton Arena • Fayetteville, Arkansas | ESPN | 19,259 | Syracuse, 91–82 | Big East (5–2) |
| Fri, Nov. 30 | 9:00 pm | DePaul | Auburn | Auburn Arena • Auburn, Alabama | ESPNU | 5,827 | DePaul, 80–76 | Big East (6–2) |
| Sat, Dec. 1 | 12:00 pm | Providence | Mississippi State | Dunkin' Donuts Center • Providence, Rhode Island | ESPNU | 6,156 | Providence, 73–63 | Big East (7–2) |
| Sat, Dec. 1 | 2:00 pm | Rutgers | Ole Miss | Tad Smith Coliseum • University, Mississippi | ESPNU | 4,277 | Ole Miss, 80–67 | Big East (7–3) |
| Sat, Dec. 1 | 3:00 pm | #17 Cincinnati | Alabama | Fifth Third Arena • Cincinnati | ESPN2 | 10,155 | Cincinnati, 58–56 | Big East (8–3) |
| Sat, Dec. 1 | 5:00 pm | Villanova | Vanderbilt | Memorial Gymnasium • Nashville, Tennessee | ESPN2 | 9,365 | Villanova, 62–52 | Big East (9–3) |
All times Eastern; Rankings from November 26 AP Poll. #5 Louisville, Connecticut and Pittsburgh did not participate for the Big East, while Texas A&M and #16 Missouri did not participate for the SEC.
