= 2009–10 West Virginia Mountaineers men's basketball team =

American college basketball season

2009–10 West Virginia Mountaineers men's basketball

Big East tournament champions 76 Classic champions

NCAA tournament, Final Four
- Conference: Big East

Ranking
- Coaches: No. 3
- AP: No. 6
- Record: 31–7 (13–5 Big East)
- Head coach: Bob Huggins (3rd season)
- Assistant coaches: Billy Hahn; Larry Harrison; Erik Martin
- Home arena: WVU Coliseum

2009–10 Big East men's basketball standings
	Conf.				Overall
Team	W		L	PCT	W		L	PCT
No. 4 Syracuse	15	–	3	.833	30	–	5	.857
No. 6 West Virginia †	13	–	5	.722	31	–	7	.816
No. 9 Villanova	13	–	5	.722	25	–	8	.758
No. 18 Pittsburgh	13	–	5	.722	25	–	9	.735
Marquette	11	–	7	.611	22	–	12	.647
Louisville	11	–	7	.611	20	–	13	.606
No. 14 Georgetown	10	–	8	.556	23	–	11	.676
Notre Dame	10	–	8	.556	23	–	12	.657
South Florida	9	–	9	.500	20	–	13	.606
Seton Hall	9	–	9	.500	19	–	13	.594
Cincinnati	7	–	11	.389	19	–	16	.543
Connecticut	7	–	11	.389	18	–	16	.529
St. John's	6	–	12	.333	17	–	16	.515
Rutgers	5	–	13	.278	15	–	17	.469
Providence	4	–	14	.222	12	–	19	.387
DePaul	1	–	17	.056	8	–	23	.258
† 2010 Big East tournament winner As of April 3, 2010; Rankings from AP Poll

The 2009–10 West Virginia Mountaineers men's basketball team represented West Virginia University in the 2009-10 NCAA Division I men's basketball season. They were coached by Bob Huggins and played their home games at the WVU Coliseum. The team captured the first Big East tournament championship in school history. They won the East Region to advance to the second Final Four in school history, where they lost in the national semi-finals to eventual National Champion Duke, 78–57. The team finished #3 in the final Coaches Poll with a record of 31–7, setting the record for most wins in school history.

== Preseason ==
=== Recruiting ===
College recruiting
Name	Hometown	School	Height	Weight	Commit date
Casey Mitchell; SG	Savannah, GA	Chipola College (FL)	6 ft 4 in (1.93 m)	218 lb (99 kg)	Mar 9, 2009
Casey Mitchell; SG	Recruit ratings: Scout: Rivals: (N/A)				
Dan Jennings; PF	Staten Island, NY	St. Thomas More School (CT)	6 ft 8 in (2.03 m)	260 lb (120 kg)	Jul 19, 2008
Dan Jennings; PF	Recruit ratings: Scout: Rivals: (92)				
Deniz Kılıçlı; C	Istanbul, Turkey	Mountain State (WV)	6 ft 9 in (2.06 m)	248 lb (112 kg)	Oct 14, 2008
Deniz Kılıçlı; C	Recruit ratings: Scout: Rivals: (93)				
Dalton Pepper; SG	Levittown, PA	Pennsbury High School (PA)	6 ft 5 in (1.96 m)	215 lb (98 kg)	Jul 19, 2008
Dalton Pepper; SG	Recruit ratings: Scout: Rivals: (91)				
Overall recruit ranking:
Note: In many cases, Scout, Rivals, 247Sports, On3, and ESPN may conflict in their listings of height and weight.; In these cases, the average was taken. ESPN grades are on a 100-point scale.; Sources: "West Virginia Basketball Commitments". Rivals.; "2009 West Virginia Basketball Commits". Scout.; "ESPN". ESPN.; "Scout.com Team Recruiting Rankings". Scout.; "2009 Team Ranking". Rivals.

== Roster ==
Name	Number	Position	Height	Weight	Year	Hometown
Darryl Bryant	25	G	6–2	200	Sophomore	Brooklyn, New York
Da'Sean Butler	1	F	6–7	230	Senior	Newark, New Jersey
Devin Ebanks	3	F	6–9	215	Sophomore	Long Island City, New York
John Flowers	41	F	6–7	215	Junior	Waldorf, Maryland
Danny Jennings	30	F	6–8	260	Freshman	Staten Island, New York
Kevin Jones	5	F	6–8	230	Sophomore	Mount Vernon, New York
Deniz Kılıçlı	42	F	6–9	260	Freshman	Istanbul, Turkey
Bryan Lowther	15	G	6–6	215	Freshman	Edinboro, Pennsylvania
Joe Mazzulla	21	G	6–2	200	Redshirt-Junior	Johnston, Rhode Island
Casey Mitchell	33	G	6–4	225	Junior	Savannah, Georgia
Cam Payne	20	G	6–4	225	Redshirt-Sophomore	Charleston, West Virginia
Dalton Pepper	32	G	6–5	215	Freshman	Levittown, Pennsylvania
Kenny Ross	12	G	6–0	175	Freshman	Furlong, Pennsylvania
Wellington Smith	35	F	6–7	245	Senior	Summit, New Jersey
Cam Thoroughman	2	F	6–7	240	Redshirt-Junior	Portsmouth, Ohio
Jonnie West	4	G	6–3	195	Redshirt-Junior	Memphis, Tennessee

== 2009–10 Schedule ==
Date time, TV	Rank^{#}	Opponent^{#}	Result	Record	Site (attendance) city, state
Exhibition
November 5, 2009*; 7:00 pm	No. 8	Charleston	W 81–48		WVU Coliseum; Morgantown, WV
November 8, 2009*; 1:00 pm	No. 8	Mountain State	W 104–82		WVU Coliseum; Morgantown, WV
Regular season
November 15, 2009*; 4:00 pm	No. 8	Loyola (MD)	W 83–60	1–0	WVU Coliseum (8,316); Morgantown, WV
November 24, 2009*; 7:00 pm	No. 8	vs. The Citadel	W 69–50	2–0	Charleston Civic Center (12,348); Charleston, WV
November 26, 2009*; 2:00 pm, ESPNU	No. 8	vs. Long Beach State; 76 Classic	W 85–62	3–0	Anaheim Convention Center (2,117); Anaheim, CA
November 27, 2009*; 2:30 pm, ESPN	No. 8	vs. Texas A&M; 76 Classic	W 73–66	4–0	Anaheim Convention Center (2,067); Anaheim, CA
November 29, 2009*; 10:00 pm, ESPN2	No. 8	vs. Portland; 76 Classic Championship Game	W 84–66	5–0	Anaheim Convention Center (2,057); Anaheim, CA
December 9, 2009*; 7:00 pm, Big East Network	No. 6	Duquesne	W 68–39	6–0	WVU Coliseum (9,835); Morgantown, WV
December 12, 2009*; 7:00 pm, Big East Network	No. 6	Coppin State	W 69–43	7–0	WVU Coliseum (10,121); Morgantown, WV
December 19, 2009*; 2:00 pm, Big East Network	No. 6	at Cleveland State	W 80–78	8–0	Wolstein Center (5,105); Cleveland, OH
December 23, 2009*; 7:30 pm, ESPN2	No. 6	No. 15 Mississippi	W 76–66	9–0	WVU Coliseum (11,139); Morgantown, WV
December 26, 2009; 3:30 pm, CBS	No. 6	at Seton Hall	W 90–84 ^{OT}	10–0 (1–0)	Prudential Center (9,800); Newark, NJ
December 29, 2009; 7:00 pm, Big East Network	No. 6	Marquette	W 63–62	11–0 (2–0)	WVU Coliseum (12,872); Morgantown, WV
January 1, 2010*; 2:30 pm, ESPN	No. 6	at No. 4 Purdue	L 77–62	11–1 (2–0)	Mackey Arena (14,123); West Lafayette, IN
January 6, 2010; 7:00 pm, Big East Network	No. 8	Rutgers	W 86–52	12–1 (3–0)	WVU Coliseum (9,586); Morgantown, WV
January 9, 2010; 8:00 pm, ESPNU	No. 8	at Notre Dame	L 70–68	12–2 (3–1)	Edmund P. Joyce Center (9,149); South Bend, IN
January 13, 2010; 7:00 pm, Big East Network	No. 10	at South Florida	W 69–50	13–2 (4–1)	USF Sun Dome (6,110); Tampa, FL
January 16, 2010; 12:00 pm, ESPN	No. 10	No. 5 Syracuse	L 72–71	13–3 (4–2)	WVU Coliseum (15,271); Morgantown, WV
January 20, 2010*; 9:00 pm	No. 11	vs. Marshall; Chesapeake Energy Capital Classic	W 68–60	14–3 (4–2)	Charleston Civic Center (12,380); Charleston, WV
January 23, 2010*; 2:00 pm, CBS	No. 11	No. 21 Ohio State	W 71–65	15–3 (4–2)	WVU Coliseum (15,033); Morgantown, WV
January 26, 2010; 8:30 pm, Big East Network	No. 9	at DePaul	W 62–46	16–3 (5–2)	Allstate Arena (8,498); Rosemont, IL
January 30, 2010; 12:00 pm, ESPN	No. 9	Louisville	W 77–74	17–3 (6–2)	WVU Coliseum (12,471); Morgantown, WV
February 3, 2010; 7:00 pm, Big East Network	No. 6	No. 22 Pittsburgh; Backyard Brawl	W 70–51	18–3 (7–2)	WVU Coliseum (15,419); Morgantown, WV
February 6, 2010; 12:00 pm, ESPNU	No. 6	at St. John's	W 79–60	19–3 (8–2)	Madison Square Garden (6,157); New York, NY
February 8, 2010; 7:00 pm, ESPN	No. 5	No. 4 Villanova	L 82–75	19–4 (8–3)	WVU Coliseum (15,593); Morgantown, WV
February 12, 2010; 9:00 pm, ESPN	No. 5	at No. 25 Pittsburgh; Backyard Brawl	L 98–95 ^{3OT}	19–5 (8–4)	Petersen Events Center (12,902); Pittsburgh, PA
February 17, 2010; 7:00 pm, Big East Network	No. 8	at Providence	W 88–74	20–5 (9–4)	Dunkin' Donuts Center (8,553); Providence, RI
February 20, 2010; 12:00 pm, ESPN	No. 8	Seton Hall	W 75–63	21–5 (10–4)	WVU Coliseum (11,816); Morgantown, WV
February 22, 2010; 7:00 pm, ESPN	No. 8	at Connecticut	L 73–62	21–6 (10–5)	XL Center (15,082); Hartford, CT
February 27, 2010; 2:00 pm, Big East Network	No. 8	Cincinnati	W 74–68	22–6 (11–5)	WVU Coliseum (12,598); Morgantown, WV
March 1, 2010; 7:00 pm, ESPN	No. 10	No. 19 Georgetown	W 81–68	23–6 (12–5)	WVU Coliseum (13,211); Morgantown, WV
March 6, 2010; 12:00 pm, CBS	No. 10	at No. 9 Villanova	W 68–66 ^{OT}	24–6 (13–5)	Wachovia Center (20,225); Philadelphia, PA
Big East tournament
March 11, 2010; 9:30 pm, ESPN	(3) No. 7	vs. (11) Cincinnati; Quarterfinals	W 54–51	25–6	Madison Square Garden (19,375); New York, NY
March 12, 2010; 9:30 pm, ESPN	(3) No. 7	vs. (7) Notre Dame; Semifinals	W 53–51	26–6	Madison Square Garden (19,375); New York, NY
March 13, 2010; 9:00 pm, ESPN	(3) No. 7	vs. (8) No. 22 Georgetown; Championship	W 60–58	27–6	Madison Square Garden (19,375); New York, NY
NCAA tournament
March 19, 2010*; 12:15 pm, CBS	(2 E) No. 6	vs. (15 E) Morgan State; First Round	W 77–50	28–6	HSBC Arena (18,653); Buffalo, NY
March 21, 2010*; 2:40 pm, CBS	(2 E) No. 6	vs. (10 E) Missouri; Second Round	W 68–59	29–6	HSBC Arena (18,934); Buffalo, NY
March 25, 2010*; 7:27 pm, CBS	(2 E) No. 6	vs. (11 E) Washington; Sweet Sixteen	W 69–56	30–6	Carrier Dome (22,271); Syracuse, NY
March 27, 2010*; 7:05 pm, CBS	(2 E) No. 6	vs. (1 E) No. 2 Kentucky; Elite Eight	W 73–66	31–6	Carrier Dome (22,497); Syracuse, NY
April 3, 2010*; 8:47 pm, CBS	(2 E) No. 6	vs. (1 S) No. 3 Duke; Final Four	L 78–57	31–7	Lucas Oil Stadium (71,298); Indianapolis, IN
*Non-conference game. ^{#}Rankings from AP Poll. (#) Tournament seedings in parentheses. All times are in Eastern Time.
