= 2009–10 Notre Dame Fighting Irish men's basketball team =

American college basketball season

2009–10 Notre Dame Fighting Irish men's basketball

NCAA tournament, Round of 64
- Conference: Big East Conference (1979–2013)
- Record: 23–12 (10–8 Big East)
- Head coach: Mike Brey
- Assistant coaches: Anthony Solomon; Rod Balanis; Martin Ingelsby
- Home arena: Purcell Pavilion at the Joyce Center

2009–10 Big East men's basketball standings
	Conf.				Overall
Team	W		L	PCT	W		L	PCT
No. 4 Syracuse	15	–	3	.833	30	–	5	.857
No. 6 West Virginia †	13	–	5	.722	31	–	7	.816
No. 9 Villanova	13	–	5	.722	25	–	8	.758
No. 18 Pittsburgh	13	–	5	.722	25	–	9	.735
Marquette	11	–	7	.611	22	–	12	.647
Louisville	11	–	7	.611	20	–	13	.606
No. 14 Georgetown	10	–	8	.556	23	–	11	.676
Notre Dame	10	–	8	.556	23	–	12	.657
South Florida	9	–	9	.500	20	–	13	.606
Seton Hall	9	–	9	.500	19	–	13	.594
Cincinnati	7	–	11	.389	19	–	16	.543
Connecticut	7	–	11	.389	18	–	16	.529
St. John's	6	–	12	.333	17	–	16	.515
Rutgers	5	–	13	.278	15	–	17	.469
Providence	4	–	14	.222	12	–	19	.387
DePaul	1	–	17	.056	8	–	23	.258
† 2010 Big East tournament winner As of April 3, 2010; Rankings from AP Poll

The 2009–10 Notre Dame Fighting Irish men's basketball team represented the University of Notre Dame in the 2009–2010 NCAA Division I basketball season. The Fighting Irish were coached by Mike Brey and played their home games at the Edmund P. Joyce Center in Notre Dame, IN. The Fighting Irish are members of the Big East Conference. They finished the season 23–12, 10–8 in Big East play. They advanced to the semifinals of the 2010 Big East men's basketball tournament before losing to West Virginia. They received an at–large bid to the 2010 NCAA Division I men's basketball tournament, earning a #6 seed in the South Region. They were upset in the first round by #11 seed Old Dominion.

== Roster ==
#	Name	Height	Weight (lbs.)	Position	Class	Hometown	Previous Team(s)
1	Tyrone Nash	6' 8"	232	F	Jr.	Queens, NY	Lawrence Woodmere Academy
2	Tory Jackson	5' 11"	195	G	Sr.	Saginaw, MI	Buena Vista HS
5	Tom Kopko	6' 2"	183	G	Jr.	Chicago, IL	St. Laurence HS
14	Scott Martin	6' 8"	219	G	Jr.	Valparaiso, IN	Valparaiso HS
20	Jonathan Peoples	6' 3"	207	G	Sr.	Bellwood, IL	St. Joseph HS
21	Tim Abromaitis	6' 8"	235	F	Jr.	Unionville, CT	Farmington HS
23	Ben Hansbrough	6' 3"	206	G	Sr.	Poplar Bluff, MO	Poplar Bluff HS; Mississippi State
25	Tom Knight	6' 9"	251	F	Fr.	Dixfield, ME	Dirigo HS
32	Joey Brooks	6' 5"	215	G	Fr.	Houston, TX	Strake Jesuit College Prep
33	Mike Broghammer	6' 9"	243	F	Fr.	Orono, MN	Hopkins HS
34	Carleton Scott	6' 7"	217	F	Jr.	San Antonio, TX	James Madison HS
41	Tim Andree	6' 8"	214	F	Sr.	Colts Neck, NJ	Christian Brothers Academy
44	Luke Harangody	6' 8"	246	F	Sr.	Schererville, IN	Andrean HS
45	Jack Cooley	6' 9"	244	F	Fr.	Glenview, IL	Glenbrook South HS

== 2009-10 Schedule and results ==
- All times are Eastern

Date time, TV	Rank^{#}	Opponent^{#}	Result	Record	Site (attendance) city, state
Exhibition
11/1/2009*; 7:00pm		Lewis	W 70–54		Edmund P. Joyce Center (8,076); Notre Dame, IN
11/6/2009*; 7:30pm		Quincy	W 75–54		Edmund P. Joyce Center (9,008); Notre Dame, IN
Regular season
11/14/2009*; 2:00pm		North Florida	W 86–65	1–0	Edmund P. Joyce Center (8,048); Notre Dame, IN
11/16/2009*; 7:30pm		Saint Francis (PA)	W 95–72	2–0	Edmund P. Joyce Center (7,512); Notre Dame, IN
11/19/2009*; 7:30pm		Long Beach State	W 82–62	3–0	Edmund P. Joyce Center (7,876); Notre Dame, IN
11/22/2009*; 7:00pm		Liberty; Chicago Invitational Challenge	W 91–72	4–0	Edmund P. Joyce Center (7,682); Notre Dame, IN
11/24/2009*; 7:30pm	No. 23	Kennesaw State; Chicago Invitational Challenge	W 80–62	5–0	Edmund P. Joyce Center (7,015); Notre Dame, IN
11/27/2009*; 7:30pm, BTN	No. 23	vs. Northwestern; Chicago Invitational Challenge	L 72–58	5–1	UIC Pavilion (3,308); Chicago, IL
11/28/2009*; 4:30pm	No. 23	vs. Saint Louis; Chicago Invitational Challenge	W 64–52	6–1	UIC Pavilion (NA); Chicago, IL
12/1/2009*; 7:30pm		Idaho State	W 80–70	7–1	Edmund P. Joyce Center (8,033); Notre Dame, IN
12/6/2009*; 12:00pm		Central Florida	W 90–72	8–1	Edmund P. Joyce Center (8,004); Notre Dame, IN
12/9/2009*; 7:30pm		IUPUI	W 93–70	9–1	Edmund P. Joyce Center (7,605); Notre Dame, IN
12/12/2009*; 7:00pm		Loyola Marymount	L 87–85	9–2	Edmund P. Joyce Center (8,574); Notre Dame, IN
12/19/2009*; 2:00pm, CBS		UCLA	W 84–73	10–2	Edmund P. Joyce Center (9,149); Notre Dame, IN
12/22/2009*; 7:00pm		Bucknell	W 101–69	11–2	Edmund P. Joyce Center (8,612); Notre Dame, IN
12/30/2009; 9:00pm, Big East Network		Providence	W 93–72	12–2 (1–0)	Edmund P. Joyce Center (9,149); Notre Dame, IN
1/2/2010; 10:00pm, ESPNU		at No. 10 Connecticut	L 82–70	12–3 (1–1)	XL Center (16,294); Hartford, CT
1/5/2010; 7:00pm, ESPNU		at South Florida	W 74–73	13–3 (2–1)	USF Sun Dome (5,107); Tampa, FL
1/9/2010; 8:00pm, ESPNU		No. 8 West Virginia	W 70–68	14–3 (3–1)	Edmund P. Joyce Center (9,149); Notre Dame, IN
1/16/2010; 4:00pm, ESPNU		at Cincinnati	L 60–58	14–4 (3–2)	Fifth Third Arena (11,589); Cincinnati, OH
1/18/2010; 7:00pm, ESPN		No. 5 Syracuse	L 84–71	14–5 (3–3)	Edmund P. Joyce Center (9,149); Notre Dame, IN
1/23/2010; 2:00pm, Big East Network		DePaul	W 87–77	15–5 (4–3)	Edmund P. Joyce Center (9,149); Notre Dame, IN
1/27/2010; 7:00pm, ESPN		at No. 3 Villanova	L 90–72	15–6 (4–4)	Wachovia Center (17,619); Philadelphia, PA
1/30/2010; 6:00pm, ESPN2		at Rutgers	L 103–90	15–7 (4–5)	Louis Brown Athletic Center (7,049); Piscataway, NJ
2/4/2010; 9:00pm, ESPN2		Cincinnati	W 83–65	16–7 (5–5)	Edmund P. Joyce Center (8,530); Notre Dame, IN
2/7/2010; 12:00pm, Big East Network		South Florida	W 65–62	17–7 (6–5)	Edmund P. Joyce Center (8,520); Notre Dame, IN
2/11/2010; 7:00pm, ESPNU		at Seton Hall	L 90–87	17–8 (6–6)	Prudential Center (8,403); Newark, NJ
2/14/2010; 7:30pm, Big East Network		St. John's	L 69–68	17–9 (6–7)	Edmund P. Joyce Center (8,547); Notre Dame, IN
2/17/2010; 7:00pm, ESPN2		at Louisville	L 91–89 ^{2OT}	17–10 (6–8)	Freedom Hall (19,623); Louisville, KY
2/24/2010; 7:00pm, ESPN2		No. 12 Pittsburgh	W 68–53	18–10 (7–8)	Edmund P. Joyce Center (8,581); Notre Dame, IN
2/27/2010; 12:00pm, CBS		at No. 11 Georgetown	W 78–64	19–10 (8–8)	Verizon Center (15,992); Washington, DC
3/3/2010; 7:00pm, ESPN		Connecticut	W 58–50	20–10 (9–8)	Edmund P. Joyce Center (9,149); Notre Dame, IN
3/6/2010; 2:00pm, Big East Network		at Marquette	W 63–60 ^{OT}	21–10 (10–8)	Bradley Center (18,942); Milwaukee, WI
Big East tournament
3/10/2010; 7:00pm, ESPN		vs. Seton Hall; Second Round	W 68–56	22–10	Madison Square Garden (19,375); New York, NY
3/11/2010; 7:00pm, ESPN		vs. No. 16 Pittsburgh; Quarterfinals	W 50–45	23–10	Madison Square Garden (19,375); New York, NY
3/12/2010; 9:00pm, ESPN		vs. No. 7 West Virginia; Semifinals	L 53–51	23–11	Madison Square Garden (19,375); New York, NY
2010 NCAA Division I men's basketball tournament
3/18/2010; 12:25pm, CBS		vs. Old Dominion; First round	L 51–50	23–12	New Orleans Arena (10,484); New Orleans, LA
*Non-conference game. ^{#}Rankings from AP Poll. (#) Tournament seedings in parentheses.
