= 2010 Big East men's basketball tournament =

- Tournament Logo
- Classification: Division I
- Season: 2009–10
- Teams: 16
- Site: Madison Square Garden; New York City
- Champions: West Virginia (1st title)
- Winning coach: Bob Huggins (1st title)
- MVP: Da'Sean Butler (West Virginia)
- Television: ESPN

2009–10 Big East men's basketball standings
	Conf.				Overall
Team	W		L	PCT	W		L	PCT
No. 4 Syracuse	15	–	3	.833	30	–	5	.857
No. 6 West Virginia †	13	–	5	.722	31	–	7	.816
No. 9 Villanova	13	–	5	.722	25	–	8	.758
No. 18 Pittsburgh	13	–	5	.722	25	–	9	.735
Marquette	11	–	7	.611	22	–	12	.647
Louisville	11	–	7	.611	20	–	13	.606
No. 14 Georgetown	10	–	8	.556	23	–	11	.676
Notre Dame	10	–	8	.556	23	–	12	.657
South Florida	9	–	9	.500	20	–	13	.606
Seton Hall	9	–	9	.500	19	–	13	.594
Cincinnati	7	–	11	.389	19	–	16	.543
Connecticut	7	–	11	.389	18	–	16	.529
St. John's	6	–	12	.333	17	–	16	.515
Rutgers	5	–	13	.278	15	–	17	.469
Providence	4	–	14	.222	12	–	19	.387
DePaul	1	–	17	.056	8	–	23	.258
† 2010 Big East tournament winner As of April 3, 2010; Rankings from AP Poll

The 2010 Big East men's basketball tournament, a part of the 2009-10 NCAA Division I men's basketball season, took place in March 2010 at Madison Square Garden in New York City. The West Virginia Mountaineers defeated the Georgetown Hoyas 60–58 in the tournament finals to receive the Big East Conference's automatic bid to the 2010 NCAA tournament. It was West Virginia's first Big East tournament championship. This was the second Big East tournament to include all 16 of the conference's teams. The teams finishing 9 through 16 in the regular season standings played first round games, while teams 5 through 8 received byes to the second round. The top 4 teams during the regular season received double-byes to the quarterfinals.

== Seeds ==
2010 Big East Men's Basketball Tournament seeds
Seed	School	Conf.	Over.	Tiebreaker
1.	‡†Syracuse	15–3	28–3	
2.	†Pittsburgh	13–5	24–7	2–1 vs. WVU/NOVA
3.	†West Virginia	13–5	24–6	2–2 vs. PITT/NOVA
4.	†Villanova	13–5	24–6	1–2 vs. PITT/WVU
5.	#Marquette	11–7	20–10	1–0 vs. LOU
6.	#Louisville	11–7	20–11	0–1 vs. MARQ
7.	#Notre Dame	10–8	21–10	1–0 vs. GTWN
8.	#Georgetown	10–8	20–9	0–1 vs. ND
9.	South Florida	9–9	19–11	1–0 vs. HALL
10.	Seton Hall	9–9	18–11	0–1 vs. USF
11.	Cincinnati	7–11	16–14	2–0 vs. CONN
12.	Connecticut	7–11	17–14	0–2 vs. CIN
13.	St. John's	6–12	16–14	
14.	Rutgers	5–13	15–16	
15.	Providence	4–14	12–18	
16.	DePaul	1–17	8–22	
‡ – Big East regular season champions, and tournament No. 1 seed. † – Received a double-bye in the conference tournament. # – Received a single-bye in the conference tournament. Overall records are as of the end of the regular season.

== Bracket ==
All times Eastern. Rankings from AP Poll.

First round Tuesday, March 9
9	South Florida	58
16	DePaul	49
12	Connecticut	51
13	St. John's	73
10	Seton Hall	109
15	Providence	106
11	Cincinnati	69
14	Rutgers	68

Second round Wednesday, March 10
8	#22 Georgetown	69
9	South Florida	49
5	Marquette	57
13	St. John's	55
7	Notre Dame	68
10	Seton Hall	56
6	Louisville	66
11	Cincinnati	69

Quarterfinals; Thursday, March 11
1	#3 Syracuse	84
8	#22 Georgetown	91
4	#10 Villanova	76
5	Marquette	80
2	#16 Pittsburgh	45
7	Notre Dame	50
3	#7 West Virginia	54
11	Cincinnati	51

Semifinals; Friday, March 12
8	#22 Georgetown	80
5	Marquette	57
7	Notre Dame	51
3	#7 West Virginia	53

Championship; Saturday, March 13
8	#22 Georgetown	58
3	#7 West Virginia	60

=== First round ===
espn2

March 9
2:30 pm ET

Recap

(13) St. John's 73, (12) Connecticut 51
Scoring by half: 35–22, 38–29
Pts: Sean Evans 19; Rebs: Sean Evans 10; Asts: Malik Boothe 9 Blocks: Justin Brownlee 4	Pts: Kemba Walker 12; Rebs: Stanley Robinson 8 Asts: Kemba Walker 4 Blocks: Ater Majok 3

Madison Square Garden
Attendance: 19,375
Referees: Karl Hess, Brian O'Connell, Karl Walton

== Broadcasters ==
=== Local Radio ===
Teams	Flagship station	Play-by-play	Analyst
Connecticut	WTIC–AM	Joe D'Ambrosio	Wayne Norman

== See also ==
- 2010 Big East women's basketball tournament
