= 2009–10 St. John's Red Storm men's basketball team =

American college basketball season

2009–10 St. John's Red Storm men's basketball

NIT, First Round
- Conference: Big East Conference
- Record: 17–16 (6–12 Big East)
- Head coach: Norm Roberts (6th year)
- Assistant coaches: Glenn Braica; Chris Casey; Fred Quartlebaum
- Home arena: Carnesecca Arena; Madison Square Garden

2009–10 Big East men's basketball standings
	Conf.				Overall
Team	W		L	PCT	W		L	PCT
No. 4 Syracuse	15	–	3	.833	30	–	5	.857
No. 6 West Virginia †	13	–	5	.722	31	–	7	.816
No. 9 Villanova	13	–	5	.722	25	–	8	.758
No. 18 Pittsburgh	13	–	5	.722	25	–	9	.735
Marquette	11	–	7	.611	22	–	12	.647
Louisville	11	–	7	.611	20	–	13	.606
No. 14 Georgetown	10	–	8	.556	23	–	11	.676
Notre Dame	10	–	8	.556	23	–	12	.657
South Florida	9	–	9	.500	20	–	13	.606
Seton Hall	9	–	9	.500	19	–	13	.594
Cincinnati	7	–	11	.389	19	–	16	.543
Connecticut	7	–	11	.389	18	–	16	.529
St. John's	6	–	12	.333	17	–	16	.515
Rutgers	5	–	13	.278	15	–	17	.469
Providence	4	–	14	.222	12	–	19	.387
DePaul	1	–	17	.056	8	–	23	.258
† 2010 Big East tournament winner As of April 3, 2010; Rankings from AP Poll

The 2009–10 St. John's Red Storm men's basketball team represented St. John's University during the 2009–10 NCAA Division I men's basketball season. The team was coached by Norm Roberts in his sixth year at the school. St. John's home games are played at Carnesecca Arena and Madison Square Garden and the team is a member of the Big East Conference.

On March 30, 2010, Steve Lavin was announced as the team's new head coach, replacing Norm Roberts, who was fired after six seasons as head coach.

== Off season ==
=== Departures ===
Name	Number	Pos.	Height	Weight	Year	Hometown	Notes
Tomas Jasiulionis	11	C	6'11"	249	Senior	Utena, Lithuania	Graduated
TyShwan Edmondson	12	G	6'4"	175	Freshman	Hopkinsville, Kentucky	Transferred to Austin Peay
Phil Wait	50	C	7'1"	245	Freshman	Manchester, England	Transferred to Monmouth

=== Class of 2009 signees ===
College recruiting information
Name	Hometown	School	Height	Weight	Commit date
Omari Lawrence; SG	Bronx, NY	South Kent	6 ft 4 in (1.93 m)	185 lb (84 kg)	
Omari Lawrence; SG	Recruit ratings: Scout: Rivals: 247Sports: (87)				
Malik Stith; PG	Hempstead, NY	Bridgton Academy	5 ft 10 in (1.78 m)	170 lb (77 kg)	
Malik Stith; PG	Recruit ratings: Scout: Rivals: 247Sports: (87)				
Dwight Hardy; SG	Bronx, NY	Indian Hills Community College	6 ft 2 in (1.88 m)	180 lb (82 kg)	
Dwight Hardy; SG	Recruit ratings: Rivals: 247Sports: (90)				
Justin Brownlee; PF	Tifton, GA	Chipola College	6 ft 7 in (2.01 m)	225 lb (102 kg)	
Justin Brownlee; PF	Recruit ratings: Rivals: 247Sports: (JC)				
Overall recruit ranking:
Note: In many cases, Scout, Rivals, 247Sports, On3, and ESPN may conflict in their listings of height and weight.; In these cases, the average was taken. ESPN grades are on a 100-point scale.; Sources: "2009 Team Ranking". Rivals.

== Roster ==
2008–09 St. John's Red Storm men's basketball team
Players
Coaches

Pos.	#	Name	Height	Weight	Year	Previous school	Hometown
G/F	1	D. J. Kennedy	6 ft 5 in (1.96 m)	214 lb (97 kg)	Jr	Schenley	Pittsburgh, PA
F	2	Anthony Mason Jr.	6 ft 7 in (2.01 m)	213 lb (97 kg)	RS Sr	Failey	Memphis, TN
G	3	Malik Boothe	5 ft 9 in (1.75 m)	184 lb (83 kg)	Jr	Christ the King	Queens, NY
G	4	John Taubeneck (W)	5 ft 11 in (1.8 m)	165 lb (75 kg)	Sr	Roger Williams	Salem, MA
F	5	Sean Evans	6 ft 8 in (2.03 m)	259 lb (117 kg)	Jr	Northeast	Philadelphia, PA
G	10	Quincy Roberts	6 ft 5 in (1.96 m)	196 lb (89 kg)	So	Harrisburg	Harrisburg, PA
G/F	11	Omari Lawrence	6 ft 4 in (1.93 m)	185 lb (84 kg)	Fr	South Kent	South Kent, CT
G	12	Dwight Hardy	6 ft 2 in (1.88 m)	187 lb (85 kg)	Jr	Kennedy/Indian Hills C.C.	Bronx, NY
F/C	15	Dele Coker	6 ft 10 in (2.08 m)	257 lb (117 kg)	Jr	South Kent	Lagos, Nigeria
G	23	Paris Horne	6 ft 3 in (1.91 m)	189 lb (86 kg)	Jr	Bridgton Academy	Middletown, DE
F	24	Justin Burrell	6 ft 8 in (2.03 m)	244 lb (111 kg)	Jr	Bridgton Academy	Bronx, NY
G	31	Malik Stith	5 ft 11 in (1.8 m)	185 lb (84 kg)	Fr	Bridgton Academy	Hempstead, NY
F	32	Justin Brownlee	6 ft 7 in (2.01 m)	232 lb (105 kg)	Jr	Choctawhatchee/Chipola	Tifton, GA
G	42	Kevin Clark (W)	6 ft 2 in (1.88 m)	204 lb (93 kg)	Jr	Dunmore	Dunmore, PA
F	55	Rob Thomas	6 ft 6 in (1.98 m)	247 lb (112 kg)	RS Jr	South Kent	Harlem, NY

Head coach

- Norm Roberts (Queens College)

Assistant coach(es)

- Glenn Braica
- Chris Casey
- Fred Quartlebaum

Legend

- (C) Team captain
- (S) Suspended
- (I) Ineligible
- (W) Walk-on
- Injured
- Current redshirt

== Schedule ==
Date time, TV	Rank^{#}	Opponent^{#}	Result	Record	Site city, state
Non-conference regular season
11/13/2009*; 7:00 pm		Long Island	W 83–70	1–0	Carnesecca Arena; New York, NY
11/17/2009*; 7:00 pm		at St. Bonaventure; Fibertech Classic	W 69–68	2–0	Blue Cross Arena; Rochester, NY
11/20/2009*; 7:00 pm		Brown; Philly Hoop Group Classic	W 79–76	3–0	Carnesecca Arena; New York, NY
11/27/2009*; 5:30 pm		vs. Siena; Philly Hoop Group Classic	W 77–68	4–0	The Palestra; Philadelphia, PA
11/28/2009*; 8:30 pm		vs. Temple; Philly Hoop Group Classic	W 55–48	5–0	The Palestra; Philadelphia, PA
12/02/2009*; 7:00 pm, SNY		Stony Brook	W 63–55	6–0	Carnesecca Arena; New York, NY
12/05/2009*; 3:30 pm, ESPN2		at No. 5 Duke	L 71–80	6–1	Cameron Indoor Stadium; Durham, NC
12/09/2009*; 7:00 pm, ESPN2		Georgia; SEC-Big East Challenge	W 66–56	7–1	Madison Square Garden; New York, NY
12/13/2009*; 4:00 pm		Fordham	W 73–56	8–1	Carnesecca Arena; New York, NY
12/20/2009*; 2:00 pm, MSG		vs. Hofstra; Madison Square Garden Holiday Festival	W 72–60	9–1	Madison Square Garden; New York, NY
12/21/2009*; 9:00 pm, MSG		vs. Cornell; Madison Square Garden Holiday Festival	L 66–71	9–2	Madison Square Garden; New York, NY
12/23/2009*; 7:00 pm		Bryant	W 80–44	10–2	Carnesecca Arena; New York, NY
Big East Conference Regular Season
12/31/2009; 8:00 pm, ESPN2		at No. 13 Georgetown	L 59–66	10–3 (0–1)	Verizon Center; Washington, D.C.
01/03/2010; 5:30 pm, SNY		Providence	L 59–74	10–4 (0–2)	Carnesecca Arena; New York City, NY
01/09/2010; 12:00 pm, SNY		at Louisville	L 68–75	10–5 (0–3)	Freedom Hall; Louisville, KY
01/13/2010; 7:00 pm, ESPNU		Cincinnati	W 52–50	11–5 (1–3)	Madison Square Garden; New York, NY
01/17/2010; 2:00 pm, MSG		DePaul	W 67–47	12–5 (2–3)	Carnesecca Arena; New York, NY
01/20/2010; 7:00 pm, SNY		at Connecticut	L 59–75	12–6 (2–4)	XL Center; Hartford, CT
01/23/2010; 12:00 pm, ESPN		No. 4 Villanova	L 71–81	12–7 (2–5)	Madison Square Garden; New York, NY
01/28/2010; 7:00 pm, ESPNU		at No. 17 Pittsburgh	L 53–63	12–8 (2–6)	Petersen Events Center; Pittsburgh, PA
02/02/2010; 7:30 pm, MSG		at Rutgers	L 72–84	12–9 (2–7)	Louis Brown Athletic Center; New Brunswick, NJ
02/06/2010; 7:00 pm, ESPNU		No. 6 West Virginia	L 60–79	12–10 (2–8)	Madison Square Garden; New York, NY
02/11/2010; 7:00 pm, ESPN		Louisville	W 74–55	13–10 (3–8)	Madison Square Garden; New York, NY
02/14/2010; 7:30 pm, SNY		at Notre Dame	W 69–68	14–10 (4–8)	Convocation Center; Notre Dame, IN
02/17/2010; 7:30 pm, MSG+		Seton Hall	L 50–59	14–11 (4–9)	Carnesecca Arena; New York, NY
02/20/2010; 12:00 pm, SNY		at South Florida	W 74–58	15–11 (5–9)	Sun Dome; Tampa, FL
02/23/2010; 7:30 pm, MSG		Marquette	L 61–63 ^{OT}	15–12 (5–10)	Carnesecca Arena; New York, NY
02/27/2010; 12:00 pm, MSG		No. 12 Pittsburgh	L 64–71	15–13 (5–11)	Madison Square Garden; New York, NY
03/02/2010; 7:00 pm, SNY		at No. 1 Syracuse	L 66–85	15–14 (5–12)	Carrier Dome; Syracuse, NY
03/05/2010; 8:30 pm, SNY		at DePaul	W 90–82 ^{3OT}	16–14 (6–12)	Allstate Arena; Rosemont, IL
Big East tournament
03/09/2010; 2:00 pm, ESPN		vs. Connecticut; First Round	W 73–51	17–14 (6–12)	Madison Square Garden; New York, NY
03/10/2010; 2:00 pm, ESPN		vs. Marquette; Second Round	L 55–57	17–15 (6–12)	Madison Square Garden; New York, NY
NIT Tournament
03/17/2010; 9:00 pm, ESPN2		at Memphis; First Round	L 71–73	17–16 (6–12)	FedExForum; Memphis, TN
*Non-conference game. ^{#}Rankings from AP Poll. (#) Tournament seedings in parentheses. All times are in Eastern Time.
