= 2009–10 Connecticut Huskies men's basketball team =

American college basketball season

2009–10 Connecticut Huskies men's basketball

NIT, Second Round
- Conference: Big East Conference
- Record: 18–16 (7–11 Big East)
- Head coach: Jim Calhoun (24th season)
- Assistant coaches: George Blaney; Andre LaFleur; Patrick Sellers
- Home arena: Harry A. Gampel Pavilion; XL Center

2009–10 Big East men's basketball standings
	Conf.				Overall
Team	W		L	PCT	W		L	PCT
No. 4 Syracuse	15	–	3	.833	30	–	5	.857
No. 6 West Virginia †	13	–	5	.722	31	–	7	.816
No. 9 Villanova	13	–	5	.722	25	–	8	.758
No. 18 Pittsburgh	13	–	5	.722	25	–	9	.735
Marquette	11	–	7	.611	22	–	12	.647
Louisville	11	–	7	.611	20	–	13	.606
No. 14 Georgetown	10	–	8	.556	23	–	11	.676
Notre Dame	10	–	8	.556	23	–	12	.657
South Florida	9	–	9	.500	20	–	13	.606
Seton Hall	9	–	9	.500	19	–	13	.594
Cincinnati	7	–	11	.389	19	–	16	.543
Connecticut	7	–	11	.389	18	–	16	.529
St. John's	6	–	12	.333	17	–	16	.515
Rutgers	5	–	13	.278	15	–	17	.469
Providence	4	–	14	.222	12	–	19	.387
DePaul	1	–	17	.056	8	–	23	.258
† 2010 Big East tournament winner As of April 3, 2010; Rankings from AP Poll

The 2009–10 Connecticut Huskies men's basketball team represented the University of Connecticut in the 2009–2010 NCAA Division I basketball season. The Huskies were coached by Jim Calhoun and played their home games at the XL Center in Hartford, Connecticut, and on campus at the Harry A. Gampel Pavilion in Storrs, Connecticut. The Huskies are a member of the Big East Conference. They finished the season 18–16, 7–11 in Big East play and lost in the first round of the 2010 Big East men's basketball tournament.

UConn was invited to the 2010 National Invitation Tournament and advanced to the second round before losing to Virginia Tech 65–63.

== Preseason ==
Senior Jerome Dyson and sophomore Kemba Walker were named to the All-BIG EAST Preseason Team while senior Stanley Robinson garnered All-BIG EAST Honorable Mention accolades.

=== Roster changes ===
UConn was hit hard due to the graduation of starters Jeff Adrien, A. J. Price, and Craig Austrie. They were also without center Hasheem Thabeet, who decided to enter the NBA at the end of the 2008–09 season.

=== Recruiting class ===
College recruiting information
Name	Hometown	School	Height	Weight	Commit date
Jamal Coombs-McDaniel; F	Boston, Massachusetts	Tilton School	6 ft 7 in (2.01 m)	197 lb (89 kg)	Oct 1, 2006
Jamal Coombs-McDaniel; F	Recruit ratings: Scout: Rivals: (94)				
Alex Oriakhi; C	Lowell, Massachusetts	Tilton School	6 ft 8 in (2.03 m)	235 lb (107 kg)	Aug 11, 2006
Alex Oriakhi; C	Recruit ratings: Scout: Rivals: (96)				
Darius Smith; G	Chicago, Illinois	Marshall Metropolitan HS	6 ft 2 in (1.88 m)	180 lb (82 kg)	Mar 30, 2009
Darius Smith; G	Recruit ratings: Scout: Rivals: (90)				
Jamaal Trice; G	Durham, North Carolina	Mt. Zion Christian Academy	6 ft 5 in (1.96 m)	178 lb (81 kg)	Jan 1, 2009
Jamaal Trice; G	Recruit ratings: Scout: Rivals: (85)				
Overall recruit ranking: Scout: 13 Rivals: 9 ESPN: 8
Note: In many cases, Scout, Rivals, 247Sports, On3, and ESPN may conflict in their listings of height and weight.; In these cases, the average was taken. ESPN grades are on a 100-point scale.; Sources: "Connecticut Commit List for 2009". Rivals.; "Men's Basketball Recruiting". Scout.; "ESPN – Connecticut Basketball Recruiting 2009". ESPN.; "Scout.com Team Recruiting Rankings". Scout.; "2009 Team Ranking". Rivals.

== Schedule ==
Date time, TV	Rank^{#}	Opponent^{#}	Result	Record	Site (attendance) city, state
Exhibition
11/4/2009*; 7:00 p.m.	No. 12	American International	W 106–67	–	XL Center (10,770); Hartford, Connecticut
11/8/2009*; 1:00 p.m.	No. 12	UMass Lowell	W 88–50	–	Gampel Pavilion (8,357); Storrs, Connecticut
Regular season
11/13/2009*; 7:30 p.m., WTNH, SNY	No. 12	William & Mary	W 75–66	1–0	Gampel Pavilion (9,719); Storrs, Connecticut
11/16/2009*; 9:00 p.m., ESPNU	No. 12	Colgate; NIT Season Tip-Off	W 77–63	2–0	Gampel Pavilion (8,562); Storrs, Connecticut
11/17/2009*; 7:00 p.m., WCTX, SNY	No. 12	Hofstra; NIT Season Tip-Off	W 76–67	3–0	Gampel Pavilion (8,713); Storrs, Connecticut
11/25/2009*; 7:00 p.m., ESPN2	No. 13	LSU; NIT Season Tip-Off	W 81–55	4–0	Madison Square Garden (8,756); New York City
11/27/2009*; 5:00 p.m., ESPN2	No. 13	#7 Duke; NIT Season Tip-Off	L 68–59	4–1	Madison Square Garden (13,179); New York
12/2/2009*; 7:00 p.m., WCTX, SNY	No. 14	Boston University	W 92–64	5–1	XL Center (11,502); Hartford, Connecticut
12/6/2009*; 1:00 p.m., WTNH, SNY	No. 14	Harvard	W 78–73	6–1	Gampel Pavilion (9,194); Storrs, Connecticut
12/9/2009*; 9:30 p.m., ESPN	No. 14	#4 Kentucky; SEC/Big East Invitational	L 64–61	6–2	Madison Square Garden (15,874); New York
12/20/2009*; 1:00 p.m., WCTX, SNY	No. 14	Central Florida	W 60–51	7–2	XL Center (13,685); Hartford, Connecticut
12/22/2009*; 1:00 p.m., WCTX, SNY	No. 11	Maine	W 71–54	8–2	XL Center (11,366); Hartford, Connecticut
12/27/2009*; 2:00 p.m., ESPNU	No. 11	Iona	W 93–74	9–2	XL Center (13,867); Hartford, Connecticut
12/30/2009; 7:00 p.m., ESPN2	No. 10	Cincinnati	L 71–69	9–3 (0–1)	Fifth Third Arena (10,409); Cincinnati
1/2/2010; 12:00 p.m., ESPNU	No. 10	Notre Dame	W 82–70	10–3 (1–1)	XL Center (16,294); Hartford, Connecticut
1/6/2010; 9:00 p.m., WCTX, SNY	No. 13	Seton Hall	W 71–63	11–3 (2–1)	Gampel Pavilion (9,522); Storrs, Connecticut
1/9/2010; 12:00 p.m., ESPN	No. 13	#12 Georgetown; Rivalry	L 72–69	11–4 (2–2)	Verizon Center (15,654); Washington, D.C.
1/13/2010; 7:00 p.m., ESPN2	No. 15	#16 Pittsburgh	L 67–57	11–5 (2–3)	XL Center (15,290); Hartford, Connecticut
1/17/2010*; 1:30 p.m., CBS	No. 15	Michigan	L 68–63	11–6	Crisler Arena (13,536); Ann Arbor, Michigan
1/20/2010; 7:00 p.m., WCTX, SNY		St. John's	W 75–59	12–6 (3–3)	XL Center (14,213); Hartford, Connecticut
1/23/2010*; 4:00 p.m., CBS		#1 Texas	W 88–74	13–6	Gampel Pavilion (10,167); Storrs, Connecticut
1/27/2010; 7:00 p.m., WCTX, SNY	No. 19	Providence	L 81–66	13–7 (3–4)	Dunkin' Donuts Center (11,136); Providence, Rhode Island
1/30/2010; 12:00 p.m., WCTX, SNY	No. 19	Marquette	L 70–68	13–8 (3–5)	XL Center (14,338); Hartford, Connecticut
2/1/2010; 7:00 p.m., ESPN		Louisville	L 82–69	13–9 (3–6)	Freedom Hall (19,655); Louisville, Kentucky
2/6/2010; 8:00 p.m., WCTX, SNY		DePaul	W 64–57	14–9 (4–6)	Gampel Pavilion (10,167); Storrs, Connecticut
2/10/2010; 7:00 p.m., ESPN		#2 Syracuse; Rivalry	L 72–67	14–10 (4–7)	Carrier Dome (24,847); Syracuse, New York
2/13/2010; 12:00 p.m., WCTX, SNY		Cincinnati	L 60–48	14–11 (4–8)	XL Center (14,605); Hartford, Connecticut
2/15/2010; 7:00 p.m., ESPN		#3 Villanova	W 84–75	15–11 (5–8)	Wachovia Center (18,123); Philadelphia
2/20/2010; 4:00 p.m., WCTX, SNY		Rutgers	W 76–58	16–11 (6–8)	RAC (8,085); Piscataway, New Jersey
2/22/2010; 7:00 p.m., ESPN		#8 West Virginia	W 73–62	17–11 (7–8)	XL Center (15,082); Hartford, Connecticut
2/28/2010; 7:00 p.m., CBS		Louisville	L 78–76	17–12 (7–9)	Gampel Pavilion (10,167); Storrs, Connecticut
3/3/2010; 7:00 p.m., ESPN		Notre Dame	L 58–50	17–13 (7–10)	Joyce Center (9,149); Notre Dame, Indiana
3/6/2010; 2:00 p.m., CBS		South Florida	L 75–68	17–14 (7–11)	USF Sun Dome (8,317); Tampa, Florida
Big East tournament
3/9/2010; 2:30 p.m., ESPN2		St. John's; Opening Round	L 73–51	17–15	Madison Square Garden (19,375); New York
2010 National Invitation Tournament
3/16/2010; 7:00 p.m., ESPN2	(4 VT)	(5 VT) Northeastern; First Round	W 59–57	18–15	Gampel Pavilion (5,571); Storrs, Connecticut
3/22/2010; 7:00 p.m., ESPN	(4 VT)	at (1 VT) Virginia Tech; Second Round	L 65–63	18–16	Cassell Coliseum (6,983); Blacksburg, Virginia
*Non-conference game. ^{#}Rankings from AP Poll. (#) Tournament seedings in parentheses.

== Roster ==
2009–10 Connecticut Huskies men's basketball team
Players
Coaches

Pos.	#	Name	Height	Weight	Year	Hometown
G	55	Kyle Bailey(W)	6 ft 3 in (1.91 m)	170 lb (77 kg)	Jr	Lancaster, New Hampshire
G	2	Donnell Beverly	6 ft 4 in (1.93 m)	190 lb (86 kg)	Jr	Hawthorne, California
G	3	Kenny Borton(W)	6 ft 2 in (1.88 m)	185 lb (84 kg)	Sr	Bolton, Connecticut
F	4	Jamal Coombs-McDaniel	6 ft 7 in (2.01 m)	210 lb (95 kg)	Fr	Dorchester, Massachusetts
G	11	Jerome Dyson	6 ft 4 in (1.93 m)	190 lb (86 kg)	Sr	Potomac, Maryland
F	33	Gavin Edwards	6 ft 10 in (2.08 m)	234 lb (106 kg)	Sr	Gilbert, Arizona
F	22	Alex Hornat(W)	6 ft 5 in (1.96 m)	205 lb (93 kg)	Sr	South Windsor, Connecticut
F	5	Ater Majok	6 ft 11 in (2.11 m)	233 lb (106 kg)	Fr	Sydney, Australia
C	32	Jonathan Mandeldove	7 ft 0 in (2.13 m)	240 lb (109 kg)	Sr	Stone Mountain, Georgia
C	35	Charles Okwandu	7 ft 0 in (2.13 m)	255 lb (116 kg)	Jr	Lagos, Nigeria
F/C	34	Alex Oriakhi	6 ft 9 in (2.06 m)	240 lb (109 kg)	Fr	Lowell, Massachusetts
F	21	Stanley Robinson	6 ft 9 in (2.06 m)	210 lb (95 kg)	Sr	Birmingham, Alabama
G	24	Darius Smith	6 ft 1 in (1.85 m)	168 lb (76 kg)	Fr	Chicago, Illinois
F	23	Benjamin Stewart(W)	6 ft 5 in (1.96 m)	205 lb (93 kg)	So	Denver, Colorado
G	13	Jamaal Trice	6 ft 5 in (1.96 m)	220 lb (100 kg)	Fr	Los Angeles, California
G	15	Kemba Walker	6 ft 1 in (1.85 m)	172 lb (78 kg)	So	Bronx, New York

Head coach

- Jim Calhoun

Assistant coach(es)

- George Blaney
- Andre LaFleur
- Patrick Sellers

Legend

- (C) Team captain
- (S) Suspended
- (I) Ineligible
- (W) Walk-on
- Injured
- Current redshirt

Roster
Last update: 1-19-10

=== Depth chart ===
Pos.	Starting 5	Bench 1	Bench 2	Inactive
C	Alex Oriakhi	Charles Okwandu		Jonathan Mandeldove
PF	Gavin Edwards	Ater Majok
SF	Stanley Robinson	Jamal Coombs-McDaniel	Alex Hornat	Benjamin Stewart
SG	Jerome Dyson	Darius Smith	Jamaal Trice
PG	Kemba Walker	Donnell Beverly	Kyle Bailey	Kenny Borton

== Broadcasters ==
Locally, the Connecticut Huskies we're broadcast on local radio by the UCONN Radio Network, with flagship station, WTIC–AM in Hartford, Connecticut.

Flagship station	Play-by-play	Analyst
WTIC–AM	Joe D'Ambrosio	Wayne Norman

== Rankings ==
Week-to-Week Rankings Legend: ██ Increase in ranking ██ Decrease in ranking — = Not ranked RV = Received votes
	Week																			
Poll	Pre	1	2	3	4	5	6	7	8	9	10	11	12	13	14	15	16	17	18	Final
AP	12	12	13	14	14	14	11	10	13	15	27	19	—	—	—	—	—	—	—	
Coaches	14	13	13	13	12	14	11	10	13	15	21	19	RV	RV	—	—	—	—	—	

== See also ==
- 2009–10 Big East Conference men's basketball season
- 2010 NCAA Men's Division I Basketball Tournament
- 2009–10 Connecticut Huskies women's basketball team
