= 2009–10 Providence Friars men's basketball team =

American college basketball season

2009–10 Providence Friars men's basketball
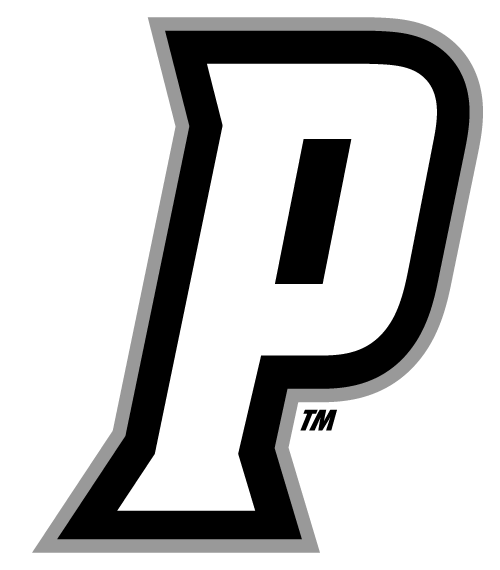
- Conference: Big East Conference (1979–2013)
- Record: 12–19 (4–14 Big East)
- Head coach: Keno Davis
- Assistant coaches: Chris Davis; Rodell Davis; Pat Skerry
- MVPs: Jamine Peterson; Sharaud Curry
- Home arena: Dunkin' Donuts Center

2009–10 Big East men's basketball standings
	Conf.				Overall
Team	W		L	PCT	W		L	PCT
No. 4 Syracuse	15	–	3	.833	30	–	5	.857
No. 6 West Virginia †	13	–	5	.722	31	–	7	.816
No. 9 Villanova	13	–	5	.722	25	–	8	.758
No. 18 Pittsburgh	13	–	5	.722	25	–	9	.735
Marquette	11	–	7	.611	22	–	12	.647
Louisville	11	–	7	.611	20	–	13	.606
No. 14 Georgetown	10	–	8	.556	23	–	11	.676
Notre Dame	10	–	8	.556	23	–	12	.657
South Florida	9	–	9	.500	20	–	13	.606
Seton Hall	9	–	9	.500	19	–	13	.594
Cincinnati	7	–	11	.389	19	–	16	.543
Connecticut	7	–	11	.389	18	–	16	.529
St. John's	6	–	12	.333	17	–	16	.515
Rutgers	5	–	13	.278	15	–	17	.469
Providence	4	–	14	.222	12	–	19	.387
DePaul	1	–	17	.056	8	–	23	.258
† 2010 Big East tournament winner As of April 3, 2010; Rankings from AP Poll

The 2009–10 Providence Friars men's basketball team represented Providence College in the Big East Conference. The team finished with a 4–14 conference record and a 12–19 record overall.

Coming off his first season with the team that included a 19–14 record and a win over top-ranked Pittsburgh, coach Keno Davis returned just one starter and only seven players overall for the 2009–10 season. Departing seniors were guard Weyinmi Efejuku, guard Jeff Xavier, forward Jonathan Kale, forward Geoff McDermott, forward Randall Hanke, as well as forwards Chris Baudinet, Brian Beloin, and Connor Heine. Additionally, forward Alex Kellogg transferred to Ohio following two seasons with the Friars. On February 23, with four games remaining in the season, junior guard Kyle Wright left the team to focus on academics.

Statistically, the Friars had the worst scoring defense in Big East history, surrendering 85.3 points per game against conference opponents. Numerous opposing players set career scoring highs in games against the Friars, including 46 points by South Florida guard Dominique Jones in an overtime game on January 23, two points shy of the conference record. On the offensive side of the ball, the Friars averaged 82.4 points per game in the regular season, the fourth-highest average in Division I. They did not receive votes in either the AP Poll or Coaches' Poll at any point in the season.

The Friars began their conference schedule with a 4–4 record, including a home win over #19 Connecticut on January 27. However, this would prove to be the Friars' final win of the season, as the team went on a 10-game losing streak, finishing 15th in the conference before losing to Seton Hall in the first round of the 2010 Big East men's basketball tournament. In the game, forward Jamine Peterson scored 38 points, the second most points in Big East tournament history.

== Roster ==
2009–10 Providence Friars men's basketball team
Players
Coaches

Pos.	#	Name	Height	Weight	Year	Previous school	Hometown
G	1	Duke Mondy	6 ft 3 in (1.91 m)	196 lb (89 kg)	Fr	Catholic Central High School	Grand Rapids, Michigan
G/F	2	Marshon Brooks	6 ft 5 in (1.96 m)	190 lb (86 kg)	Jr	Tucker High School	Stone Mountain, Georgia
G	3	Johnnie Lacy	6 ft 0 in (1.83 m)	170 lb (77 kg)	Fr	Notre Dame Prep	Milwaukee, Wisconsin
G	4	Sharaud Curry	5 ft 10 in (1.78 m)	170 lb (77 kg)	RS Sr	Joseph Wheeler High School	Gainesville, Georgia
G/F	5	Kyle Wright	6 ft 6 in (1.98 m)	215 lb (98 kg)	Jr	Monroe Community College	Hartford, Connecticut
F	10	Kadeem Batts (redshirt)	6 ft 8 in (2.03 m)	235 lb (107 kg)	Fr	McEachern High School	Powder Springs, Georgia
G	12	Luke Burchett (W)	6 ft 0 in (1.83 m)	185 lb (84 kg)	Sr	Fenwick High School	Western Springs, Illinois
G	15	Xavier Davis (W) (redshirt)	5 ft 11 in (1.8 m)	160 lb (73 kg)	Fr	Smithfield High School	Smithfield, Rhode Island
F	21	Jamine Peterson	6 ft 6 in (1.98 m)	230 lb (104 kg)	RS So	Notre Dame Prep	Brooklyn, New York
G	23	Brian McKenzie	6 ft 4 in (1.93 m)	205 lb (93 kg)	Sr	Xaverian High School	Brooklyn, New York
G	32	Vincent Council	6 ft 2 in (1.88 m)	180 lb (82 kg)	Fr	The Patterson School	Brooklyn, New York
G	41	Chris Carter (W)	6 ft 4 in (1.93 m)	180 lb (82 kg)	Jr	Shepherd Hill Regional High School	Worcester, Massachusetts
F/C	42	Bilal Dixon	6 ft 8 in (2.03 m)	228 lb (103 kg)	RS Fr	Queen of Peace High School	Jersey City, New Jersey
F	44	Russ Permenter	6 ft 9 in (2.06 m)	230 lb (104 kg)	Jr	Temple College	Temple, Texas
F	45	James Still	6 ft 9 in (2.06 m)	210 lb (95 kg)	Fr	Detroit Community High School	Detroit, Michigan
C	55	Ray Hall	6 ft 11 in (2.11 m)	265 lb (120 kg)	Sr	J. K. Mullen High School	Denver, Colorado

Head coach

Keno Davis

Assistant coach(es)

Chris Davis
Rodell Davis
Pat Skerry

Legend

- (C) Team captain
- (S) Suspended
- (I) Ineligible
- (W) Walk-on
- Injured
- Current redshirt

Roster
Last update: 2010-02-06

=== Depth chart ===
Pos.	Starting 5	Bench 1	Bench 2	Bench 3
C	Bilal Dixon	Ray Hall	James Still
PF	Jamine Peterson	Russ Permenter	Kadeem Batts (redshirt)
SF	Marshon Brooks	(Kyle Wright)
SG	Brian McKenzie	Duke Mondy	Luke Burchett (W)	Chris Carter (W)
PG	Sharaud Curry	Vincent Council	Johnnie Lacy	Xavier Davis (W) (redshirt)

=== Incoming recruits ===
College recruiting information
Name	Hometown	School	Height	Weight	Commit date
Kadeem Batts; PF	Powder Springs, GA	McEacern HS	6 ft 8 in (2.03 m)	220 lb (100 kg)	Sep 14, 2008
Kadeem Batts; PF	Recruit ratings: Scout: Rivals: (88)				
Vincent Council; PG	Brooklyn, NY	The Patterson School	6 ft 1 in (1.85 m)	175 lb (79 kg)	Jan 7, 2009
Vincent Council; PG	Recruit ratings: Scout: Rivals: (91)				
Johnnie Lacy; PG	Milwaukee, WI	Notre Dame Prep	5 ft 10 in (1.78 m)	160 lb (73 kg)	Nov 19, 2008
Johnnie Lacy; PG	Recruit ratings: Scout: Rivals: (88)				
Duke Mondy; SG	Grand Rapids, MI	Catholic Central HS	6 ft 4 in (1.93 m)	180 lb (82 kg)	Sep 10, 2008
Duke Mondy; SG	Recruit ratings: Scout: Rivals: (85)				
Russ Permenter; PF	Temple, TX	Temple College	6 ft 9 in (2.06 m)	231 lb (105 kg)	Feb 16, 2009
Russ Permenter; PF	Recruit ratings: Scout: Rivals: (N/A)				
James Still; C	Detroit, MI	Detroit Community HS	6 ft 9 in (2.06 m)	205 lb (93 kg)	Oct 7, 2008
James Still; C	Recruit ratings: Scout: Rivals: (88)				
Kyle Wright; SF	Hartford, CT	Monroe CC	6 ft 6 in (1.98 m)	215 lb (98 kg)	Oct 6, 2008
Kyle Wright; SF	Recruit ratings: Scout: Rivals: (N/A)				
Overall recruit ranking:
Note: In many cases, Scout, Rivals, 247Sports, On3, and ESPN may conflict in their listings of height and weight.; In these cases, the average was taken. ESPN grades are on a 100-point scale.; Sources: "2009 Providence Signees". Rivals.; "2009 Providence Signees". Scout.; "2009 Providence Signees". ESPN.; "Scout.com Team Recruiting Rankings". Scout.; "2009 Team Ranking". Rivals.

== Schedule ==
Date time, TV	Rank^{#}	Opponent^{#}	Result	Record	Site (attendance) city, state
Exhibition
October 31*; 4:00 pm		Merrimack	W 97–74	—	Alumni Hall; Providence, RI
November 7*; 7:00 pm		Stonehill	W 91–55	—	Dunkin' Donuts Center; Providence, RI
Non-conference regular season
November 13*; 7:30 pm		Bryant; World Vision Invitational	W 96–53	1–0	Dunkin' Donuts Center (6,745); Providence, RI
November 14*; 6:30 pm		Bucknell; World Vision Invitational	W 76–65	2–0	Dunkin' Donuts Center (7,163); Providence, RI
November 15*; 2:30 pm		Mercer; World Vision Invitational	W 79–77	3–0	Dunkin' Donuts Center (4,877); Providence, RI
November 20*; 8:00 pm		at Alabama	L 75–84	3–1	Coleman Coliseum (10,032); Tuscaloosa, AL
November 24*; 7:00 pm		Vermont	W 106–64	4–1	Dunkin' Donuts Center (6,954); Providence, RI
November 28*; 7:00 pm, Cox Sports		Boston College	L 77–82	4–2	Dunkin' Donuts Center (10,782); Providence, RI
December 1*; 7:00 pm, Cox Sports		at Northeastern	W 76–72	5–2	Matthews Arena (2,622); Boston, MA
December 5*; 1:00 pm, Cox Sports		at Rhode Island	L 82–86	5–3	Ryan Center (7,675); Kingston, RI
December 7*; 7:00 pm		Brown	W 78–62	6–3	Dunkin' Donuts Center (5,127); Providence, RI
December 9*; 7:00 pm		at George Washington	W 110–97	7–3	Charles E. Smith Center (3,015); Washington, D.C.
December 12*; 7:00 pm		Iona	L 73–82	7–4	Dunkin' Donuts Center (6,851); Providence, RI
December 21*; 7:00 pm		Yale	W 87–78	8–4	Dunkin' Donuts Center (4,206); Providence, RI
Big East regular season
December 30; 9:00 pm, Cox Sports		at Notre Dame	L 78–93	8–5 (0–1)	Edmund P. Joyce Center (9,149); Notre Dame, IN
January 3; 5:30 pm, Cox Sports		at St. John's	W 74–59	9–5 (1–1)	Carnesecca Arena (5,003); Queens, NY
January 6; 7:00 pm, ESPNU		Louisville	L 70–92	9–6 (1–2)	Dunkin' Donuts Center (9,207); Providence, RI
January 9; 8:00 pm, Cox Sports		Rutgers	W 94–81	10–6 (2–2)	Dunkin' Donuts Center (7,530); Providence, RI
January 14; 9:00 pm, ESPN2		at DePaul	W 79–62	11–6 (3–2)	Allstate Arena (7,533); Rosemont, IL
January 17; 4:00 pm, Cox Sports		at Marquette	L 63–93	11–7 (3–3)	Bradley Center (16,154); Milwaukee, WI
January 23; 8:00 pm, ESPNU		South Florida	L 105–109 ^{OT}	11–8 (3–4)	Dunkin' Donuts Center (9,184); Providence, RI
January 27; 7:00 pm, Cox Sports		No. 19 Connecticut	W 81–66	12–8 (4–4)	Dunkin' Donuts Center (11,136); Providence, RI
January 30; 8:00 pm, ESPNU		at Cincinnati	L 88–92	12–9 (4–5)	Fifth Third Arena (10,045); Cincinnati, OH
February 2; 7:00 pm, Cox Sports		at No. 3 Syracuse	L 68–85	12–10 (4–6)	Carrier Dome (20,205); Syracuse, NY
February 6; 12:00 pm, Cox Sports		Marquette	L 79–82	12–11 (4–7)	Dunkin' Donuts Center (12,061); Providence, RI
February 9; 7:00 pm, ESPN2		No. 7 Georgetown	L 70–79	12–12 (4–8)	Dunkin' Donuts Center (9,073); Providence, RI
February 13; 2:00 pm, ESPNU		at No. 4 Villanova	L 81–92	12–13 (4–9)	Wachovia Center (18,622); Philadelphia, PA
February 17; 7:00 pm, Cox Sports		No. 8 West Virginia	L 74–88	12–14 (4–10)	Dunkin' Donuts Center (8,553); Providence, RI
February 23; 7:00 pm, ESPNU		No. 4 Syracuse	L 85–99	12–15 (4–11)	Dunkin' Donuts Center (12,410); Providence, RI
February 27; 7:00 pm, ESPN360		at South Florida	L 93–99	12–16 (4–12)	USF Sun Dome (5,061); Tampa, FL
March 4; 9:00 pm, ESPN2		at No. 17 Pittsburgh	L 71–73	12–17 (4–13)	Petersen Events Center (12,511); Pittsburgh, PA
March 6; 7:00 pm, ESPN360		Seton Hall	L 80–92	12–18 (4–14)	Dunkin' Donuts Center (9,061); Providence, RI
Big East tournament
March 9; 7:00 pm, ESPNU	(15)	vs. (10) Seton Hall; Big East First Round	L 106–109	12–19 (4–14)	Madison Square Garden (19,375); New York, NY
*Non-conference game. ^{#}Rankings from AP Poll. (#) Tournament seedings in parentheses. All times are in Eastern Time. Source

== Awards and honors ==
Recipient	Award(s)
Kadeem Batts	2010 John Zannini Coaches' Award
Luke Burchett	2010 Thomas Ramos Academic Award
Vincent Council	2010 All-Big East All-Rookie Team; 2010 Coca-Cola Most Promising Prospect Award; January 18: Big East Rookie of the Week
Sharaud Curry	2010 Co-Jimmy Walker Most Valuable Player Award
Ray Hall	2010 Ernie D Team Leader Award
Brian McKenzie	2010 Marvin Barnes Defensive Player Award
Jamine Peterson	2010 All Big-East Honorable Mention; 2010 USBWA District 1 Player of the Year; 2010 USBWA All-District 1; 2010 Co-Jimmy Walker Most Valuable Player Award; 2010 Ryan Gomes Most Improved Player Award
James Still	2010 Lenny Wilkens Hustle Award
