= 2009–10 Villanova Wildcats men's basketball team =

American college basketball season

2009–10 Villanova Wildcats men's basketball

Puerto Rico Tip-Off Champions

NCAA tournament, Round of 32
- Conference: Big East Conference

Ranking
- Coaches: No. 15
- AP: No. 9
- Record: 25–8 (13–5 Big East)
- Head coach: Jay Wright
- Assistant coaches: Chris Walker; Doug West; Jason Donnelly
- Home arena: The Pavilion

2009–10 Big East men's basketball standings
	Conf.				Overall
Team	W		L	PCT	W		L	PCT
No. 4 Syracuse	15	–	3	.833	30	–	5	.857
No. 6 West Virginia †	13	–	5	.722	31	–	7	.816
No. 9 Villanova	13	–	5	.722	25	–	8	.758
No. 18 Pittsburgh	13	–	5	.722	25	–	9	.735
Marquette	11	–	7	.611	22	–	12	.647
Louisville	11	–	7	.611	20	–	13	.606
No. 14 Georgetown	10	–	8	.556	23	–	11	.676
Notre Dame	10	–	8	.556	23	–	12	.657
South Florida	9	–	9	.500	20	–	13	.606
Seton Hall	9	–	9	.500	19	–	13	.594
Cincinnati	7	–	11	.389	19	–	16	.543
Connecticut	7	–	11	.389	18	–	16	.529
St. John's	6	–	12	.333	17	–	16	.515
Rutgers	5	–	13	.278	15	–	17	.469
Providence	4	–	14	.222	12	–	19	.387
DePaul	1	–	17	.056	8	–	23	.258
† 2010 Big East tournament winner As of April 3, 2010; Rankings from AP Poll

The 2009-10 Villanova Wildcats men's basketball team represented Villanova University in the 2009–10 NCAA Division I men's basketball season. Villanova was led by head coach Jay Wright. The Wildcats participated in the Big East Conference and played their home games at The Pavilion with some select home games at the Wachovia Center. They finished the season 25–8, 13–5 in Big East play. They were eliminated in the quarterfinals of the 2010 Big East men's basketball tournament by Marquette. They received an at-large bid to the 2010 NCAA Division I men's basketball tournament, earning a 2 seed in the South Region, where they were upset by 10 seed Saint Mary's in the second round.

== Class of 2009 ==
College recruiting
Name	Hometown	School	Height	Weight	Commit date
Isaiah Armwood; PF	Rockville, MD	Montrose Christian School	6 ft 7 in (2.01 m)	185 lb (84 kg)	Jul 1, 2008
Isaiah Armwood; PF	Recruit ratings: Scout: Rivals: (93)				
Dominic Cheek; SF	Jersey City, NJ	St. Anthony HS	6 ft 5 in (1.96 m)	175 lb (79 kg)	Dec 12, 2008
Dominic Cheek; SF	Recruit ratings: Scout: Rivals: (96)				
Mouphtaou Yarou; PF	Rockville, MD	Montrose Christian School	6 ft 9 in (2.06 m)	235 lb (107 kg)	Aug 25, 2008
Mouphtaou Yarou; PF	Recruit ratings: Scout: Rivals: (97)				
Maalik Wayns; PG	Philadelphia, PA	Roman Catholic HS	6 ft 1 in (1.85 m)	175 lb (79 kg)	Jun 29, 2007
Maalik Wayns; PG	Recruit ratings: Scout: Rivals: (96)				
Overall Recruiting Rankings: Scout – 2 Rivals – 3 ESPN – 3

== Preseason ==
The Villanova Wildcats come back from a 2008–09 season which had a record of 30-8 (13-5) with the season ending in the school's 4th appearance in the Final Four.

== Schedule and results ==
Date	Opponent	Rank	Location	Televised	Time/W-L	Result	Overall	Conf.	Attendance
**Regular Season**
Nov. 5	Kutztown (exhibition)	5	Wachovia Spectrum	None	W	110–84	–	–	N/A
Nov. 13	Fairleigh Dickinson	5	Villanova, PA	None	W	84–61	1–0	–	6,500
Nov. 16	Penn	5	Villanova, PA	None	W	103–65	2–0	–	6,500
Nov. 19	George Mason	5	San Juan, Puerto Rico (Puerto Rico Tip-Off First Round)	ESPNU	W	69–68	3–0	–	5,762
Nov. 20	#18 Dayton	5	San Juan, Puerto Rico (Puerto Rico Tip-Off Semi-Final)	ESPNU	W	71–65	4–0	–	8,357
Nov. 22	Ole Miss	5	San Juan, Puerto Rico (Puerto Rico Tip-Off Title)	ESPN2	W	79–67	5–0	–	8,357
Nov. 28	La Salle	4	Villanova, PA	ESPN2	W	81–63	6–0	–	6,500
Dec. 2	@ Drexel	3	Villanova, PA	None	W	77–58	7–0	–	6,500
Dec. 6	Maryland	3	Washington D.C. (Verizon Center)	Fox Sports	W	95–86	8–0	–	16,389
Dec. 9	@ St. Joseph's	3	Philadelphia, PA (The Palestra)	ESPN2	W	97–89	9–0	–	8,722
Dec. 13	@ Temple	3	Philadelphia, PA (Liacouras Center)	CBS CSN	L	65–75	9–1	–	8,449
Dec. 19	@ Fordham	8	East Rutherford, N.J. (Izod Center)	None	W	96–58	10–1	–	5,137
Dec. 23	Delaware	8	Villanova, PA	None	W	97–63	11–1	–	6,500
Jan. 2	@ **Marquette**	8	Milwaukee, WI	ESPN2	W	74–72	12–1	1–0	18,093
Jan. 6	**DePaul**	6	Villanova, PA	WPHL	W	99–72	13–1	2–0	6,500
Jan. 9	**Marquette**	6	Villanova, PA	WPHL	W	78–76	14–1	3–0	6,500
Jan. 11	@ **Louisville**	4	Louisville, KY	ESPN	W	92–84	15–1	4–0	20,076
Jan. 17	#11 **Georgetown**	4	Philadelphia, PA (Wachovia Center)	WPHL	W	82–77	16–1	5–0	20,416
Jan. 20	@ **Rutgers**	4	Piscataway, N.J.	WPHL	W	94–68	17–1	6–0	8,085
Jan. 23	@ **St. John's**	4	New York, NY	ESPN	W	81–71	18–1	7–0	14,432
Jan. 27	**Notre Dame**	3	Philadelphia, PA (Wachovia Center)	ESPN	W	90–72	19–1	8–0	17,619
Feb. 2	**Seton Hall**	2	Villanova, PA	ESPNU	W	81–71	20–1	9–0	6,500
Feb. 6	@ #7 **Georgetown**	2	Washington D.C.	ESPN	L	90–103	20–2	9–1	10,387
Feb. 8	@ #5 **West Virginia**	4	Morgantown, WV	ESPN	W	82–75	21–2	10–1	15,593
Feb. 13	**Providence**	4	Philadelphia, PA (Wachovia Center)	ESPNU	W	92–81	22–2	11–1	18,622
Feb. 15	**Connecticut**	3	Philadelphia, PA (Wachovia Center)	ESPN	L	75–84	22–3	11–2	18,123
Feb. 21	@ #19 **Pittsburgh**	3	Pittsburgh, PA	CBS	L	65–70	22–4	11–3	12,920
Feb. 24	**USF**	7	Villanova, PA	WPHL	W	74–49	23–4	12–3	6,500
Feb. 27	@ #4 **Syracuse**	7	Syracuse, NY	ESPN	L	77–95	23–5	12–4	34,616
Mar. 2	@ **Cincinnati**	9	Cincinnati, OH	ESPN2	W	77–73	24–5	13–4	11,076
Mar. 6	#10 **West Virginia**	9	Philadelphia, PA (Wachovia Center)	CBS	L	66–68	24–6	13–5	20,225
**2010 Big East tournament**
Mar. 11	**Marquette**	10	New York, NY (Madison Square Garden)	ESPN	L	76–80	24–7		19,375
**2010 NCAA Division I men's basketball tournament**
Mar. 18	Robert Morris	9	Providence, RI	CBS	W	73–70 (OT)	25–7		N/A
Mar. 20	Saint Mary's	9	Providence, RI	CBS	L	68–75	25–8		11,271
Big East regular-season games in **bold**. • Philadelphia Big Five games in italics. • * represent seedings in NCAA Tournament.

== Rankings ==
Ranking movements Legend: ██ Increase in ranking ██ Decrease in ranking ( ) = First-place votes
	Week																			
Poll	Pre	1	2	3	4	5	6	7	8	9	10	11	12	13	14	15	16	17	18	Final
AP	5	5	4	3	3	8	8	8	6	4	4	3	2 (4)	4	3	7	9	10	9	Not released
Coaches	6	6	4	3	3	9	8	8	6	4	4	3	2 (4)	5	3	8	9	10	9	15

== Roster ==
2009–10 Villanova Wildcats men's basketball team
Players
Coaches

Pos.	#	Name	Height	Weight	Year	Hometown
F	0	Antonio Pena	6 ft 8 in (2.03 m)	235 lb (107 kg)	Jr	Brooklyn, New York
G	1	Scottie Reynolds	6 ft 2 in (1.88 m)	195 lb (88 kg)	Sr	Herndon, Virginia
G	4	Jason Colenda	6 ft 0 in (1.83 m)	205 lb (93 kg)	Sr	Fairfax, Virginia
G	5	Maalik Wayns	6 ft 1 in (1.85 m)	185 lb (84 kg)	Fr	Philadelphia, Pennsylvania
G	10	Corey Fisher	6 ft 1 in (1.85 m)	185 lb (84 kg)	Jr	Bronx, New York
F	13	Mouphtaou Yarou	6 ft 9 in (2.06 m)	215 lb (98 kg)	Fr	Natitingou, Benin
G	15	Reggie Redding	6 ft 5 in (1.96 m)	205 lb (93 kg)	Sr	Philadelphia, Pennsylvania
C	21	Maurice Sutton (redshirt)	6 ft 11 in (2.11 m)	215 lb (98 kg)	Fr	Upper Marlboro, Maryland
F	23	Russell Wooten	6 ft 4 in (1.93 m)	210 lb (95 kg)	Sr	Chula Vista, California
G	24	Corey Stokes	6 ft 5 in (1.96 m)	195 lb (88 kg)	Jr	Bayonne, New Jersey
F	31	Taylor King	6 ft 6 in (1.98 m)	225 lb (102 kg)	So	Huntington Beach, California
F	34	Isaiah Armwood	6 ft 7 in (2.01 m)	185 lb (84 kg)	Fr	Baltimore, Maryland

Head coach

- Jay Wright (Bucknell)

Assistant coach(es)

- Chris Walker (Villanova)
- Doug West (Villanova)
- Jason Donnelly (Muhlenberg)

Legend

- (C) Team captain
- (S) Suspended
- (I) Ineligible
- (W) Walk-on
- Injured
- Current redshirt

Roster
Last update: 2009-11-13
