= Yous Mbao =

Senegalese basketball player

Personal information
- Born: April 12, 1990 (age 36) Dakar, Senegal
- Listed height: 7 ft 2 in (2.18 m)
- Listed weight: 250 lb (113 kg)

Career information
- High school: Stoneridge Prep (Simi Valley, California)
- College: Marquette (2009–2010); Marshall (2011–2014)
- NBA draft: 2014: undrafted
- Position: Center
- Number: 34

Youssoupha Mbao (born 16 April 1990) is a Senegalese basketball player who played three seasons for the Marshall University Thundering Herd men's basketball team of Conference USA in the United States from 2011 to 2014. He played as an amateur on the professional CB Gran Canaria of the Spanish ACB. Although he played some games as a professional, Mbao himself was not paid and was still considered an amateur and eligible to participate in college basketball in the U.S.

After playing a year of high school basketball in California, Mbao was considered to be one of the most promising young Senegalese basketball players.

In April 2009, Mbao signed to play NCAA college basketball for Marquette University in Milwaukee, Wisconsin (Big East Conference). After one season at Marquette in which he saw action in 10 games, Mbao transferred to Marshall.

Due to NCAA transfer regulations, Mbao was forced to sit out the 2010–2011 season. At Marshall, Mbao played in a total of 68 games and finished his collegiate career averaging 0.4 points and 1.5 rebounds per game. His final year at Marshall was the 2013–14 season.
