= 2009–10 Big East Conference men's basketball season =

- League: NCAA Division I
- Sport: Basketball
- Duration: November 9, 2009 through March 6, 2010
- Teams: 16
- Total attendance: 2,942,432
- Average attendance: 10,898
- TV partner(s): Big East Network, ESPN

Regular Season
- Champion: Syracuse (15–3)
- Runners-up: Pittsburgh, West Virginia, and Villanova (13–5)
- Season MVP: Wesley Johnson (SYR)

Tournament
- Champions: West Virginia
- Runners-up: Georgetown
- Finals MVP: Da'Sean Butler (WVU)

Big East Conference men's basketball seasons
- ← 2008–09 2010–11 →

2009–10 Big East men's basketball standings
	Conf.				Overall
Team	W		L	PCT	W		L	PCT
No. 4 Syracuse	15	–	3	.833	30	–	5	.857
No. 6 West Virginia †	13	–	5	.722	31	–	7	.816
No. 9 Villanova	13	–	5	.722	25	–	8	.758
No. 18 Pittsburgh	13	–	5	.722	25	–	9	.735
Marquette	11	–	7	.611	22	–	12	.647
Louisville	11	–	7	.611	20	–	13	.606
No. 14 Georgetown	10	–	8	.556	23	–	11	.676
Notre Dame	10	–	8	.556	23	–	12	.657
South Florida	9	–	9	.500	20	–	13	.606
Seton Hall	9	–	9	.500	19	–	13	.594
Cincinnati	7	–	11	.389	19	–	16	.543
Connecticut	7	–	11	.389	18	–	16	.529
St. John's	6	–	12	.333	17	–	16	.515
Rutgers	5	–	13	.278	15	–	17	.469
Providence	4	–	14	.222	12	–	19	.387
DePaul	1	–	17	.056	8	–	23	.258
† 2010 Big East tournament winner As of April 3, 2010; Rankings from AP Poll

The 2009–10 Big East Conference men's basketball season was the 31st in conference history, and involved its 16 full-time member schools. Syracuse captured the regular season title, its eighth overall, and second outright. However, West Virginia won the 2010 Big East men's basketball tournament, their first.

== Preseason ==
At Big East media day in October, the conference released their predictions for standings and All-Big East teams.

=== Predicted Big East results ===
	Big East Coaches Poll	Rivals.com
1.	Villanova (10*)	Villanova
2.	West Virginia (5)	West Virginia
3.	Connecticut (1)	Connecticut
4.	Louisville	Georgetown
5.	Georgetown	Louisville
6.	Syracuse	Pittsburgh
7.	Cincinnati	Syracuse
8.	Notre Dame	Cincinnati
9.	Pittsburgh	Notre Dame
10.	Seton Hall	Seton Hall
11.	St. John's	Marquette
12.	Marquette	Providence
13.	Providence	St. John's
14.	South Florida	South Florida
15.	Rutgers	Rutgers
16.	DePaul	DePaul
	*first place votes	

=== Preseason All-Big East teams ===
First Team	Second Team	Honorable Mention
Luke Harangody, F., ND; Deonta Vaughn, G., CIN; Greg Monroe, C., GTWN; Lazar Hayward, F., MARQ; Scottie Reynolds, G., VILL; Da'Sean Butler, F., WVU	Jerome Dyson, G., CONN; Kemba Walker, G., CONN; Samardo Samuels, F., LOU; Jeremy Hazell, G., HALL; Dominique Jones, G., USF; Devin Ebanks, F., WVU	Stanley Robinson, F., CONN; Arinze Onuaku, C., SYR

Big East Preseason Player of the Year: Luke Harangody, F., Notre Dame
Big East Preseason Rookie of the Year: Lance Stephenson, G., Cincinnati

=== Preseason national polls ===
	AP	Coaches	Athlon	Lindy's	Sporting News	Fox Sports	CBS Sports	SI.com	Rivals.com	Blue Ribbon Yearbook
Cincinnati									49	
Connecticut	12	14	11		15	12	7	3	12	18
DePaul									155	
Georgetown	20	21	21		11	19	24	18	18	24
Louisville	19	23	19	15			22	28	20	
Marquette									83	
Notre Dame	RV	RV			22		RV	RV	64	
Pittsburgh	RV	RV							31	
Providence									89	
Rutgers									147	
St. John's									124	
Seton Hall									80	
South Florida									144	
Syracuse	RV	25					RV	RV	42	16
Villanova	5	6	7	4	9	7	6	4	4	4
West Virginia	8	9	10	18	5	6	9	8	9	12

=== Watchlists ===
On August 19, the Wooden Award preseason watch list included eleven Big East players. The watchlist was composed of 50 players who were not transfers, freshmen or medical redshirts. On October 29, the Naismith College Player of the Year watchlist of 50 players was announced, which included nine Big East names.

	Wooden	Naismith
Da'Sean Butler, WVU	✓	✓
Jerome Dyson, CONN	✓	✓
Devin Ebanks, WVU	✓	✓
Corey Fisher, VILL	✓	
Luke Harangody, ND	✓	✓
Lazar Hayward, MARQ		✓
Jeremy Hazell, HALL	✓	
Greg Monroe, GTWN	✓	✓
Scottie Reynolds, VILL	✓	✓
Samardo Samuels, LOU	✓	✓
Deonta Vaughn, CIN	✓	
Kemba Walker, CONN	✓	✓

== Regular season ==
=== Season summary & highlights ===
- Syracuse head coach Jim Boeheim became the eighth Division I coach to win 800 games, when the Orange defeated Albany, 75–43, on November 9.
- Notre Dame forward Luke Harangody became the first Fighting Irish player to surpass the 2,000-point and 1,000-rebound mark, during an 80–70 victory over Idaho State on December 2.
- Syracuse won the 2K Sports Coaches vs. Cancer Classic, upsetting #13 California in the semifinals, 95–73, and #6 North Carolina in the finals, 87–71.
- Villanova won the Puerto Rico Tip-Off, defeating Mississippi, 79–67.
- West Virginia won the 76 Classic, defeating Portland, 84–66.
- Connecticut was the runner-up in the NIT Season Tip-Off, losing to #7 Duke, 68–59.
- Pittsburgh was the runner-up in the CBE Classic, losing to #2 Texas, 78–62.
- Marquette was the runner-up in the Old Spice Classic, losing to Florida State, 57–56.
- On January 11, DePaul head coach Jerry Wainwright was fired after a 7–8 start, and a 22-game Big East losing streak, becoming the fourth NCAA Division I coach to leave his position since the season began. Wainwright, who compiled a 59–80 record in five seasons at the school, was replaced on an interim basis by assistant coach Tracy Webster, who remained until a national search concluded following the end of the season.
- On January 18, Connecticut fell out of the AP Poll for the first time since January 28, 2008, after losing consecutive games, to Georgetown, Pittsburgh, and Michigan.
- On January 20, it was announced that Connecticut head coach Jim Calhoun would go on an immediate medical leave of absence, the circumstances of his condition unknown, but unrelated to his previous bouts with cancer and heart issues. UConn athletic director Jeff Hathaway insisted that Calhoun's condition was not career ending, and would not affect the terms of a four-year contract extension, agreed upon in principle in December 2009, but that he did not know when Calhoun would return. Associate head coach George Blaney took over for Calhoun, and lead the Huskies to wins at home against St. John's, then-No. 1 Texas and DePaul, and four losses at Providence, home vs. Marquette, at Louisville, and at Syracuse. Calhoun returned on February 13 for a home loss against Cincinnati, and has since kept quiet on the circumstances of his leave.
- Syracuse head coach Jim Boeheim extended his NCAA Division-I record for most 20-win seasons to 32, when then-no. 4 Syracuse rallied from a 14–0 starting deficit to defeat then-no. 7 Georgetown, 73–56, on January 25.
- On February 27, then-no. 4 Syracuse clinched its eighth Big East regular season title and a no. 1 seed in the Big East tournament by beating then-no. 8 Villanova, 95–77. The game also set the NCAA on-campus basketball attendance record, with 34,616 spectators packing the Carrier Dome. Three days later they won the title outright, with a win against St. John's, 85–66.
- On March 1, Syracuse achieved its first no. 1 ranking in the AP Poll since the 1989–90 season, and its first in the ESPN/USA Today coaches' poll since winning the national championship in 2003.
- On March 6, Louisville upset no. 1 Syracuse 78–68 in the final game at Freedom Hall in front of an arena-record crowd of 20,135.

=== Midseason watchlists ===
On January 4, the Wooden Award midseason watchlist was released, and included six Big East players—more than any other conference. The list was composed of 31 players, reduced from the preseason list of 50. Newcomers included junior forward Wesley Johnson of Syracuse. In addition, six Big East players who were on the preseason list did not appear at midseason: Devin Ebanks, Corey Fisher, Jeremy Hazell, Samardo Samuels, Deonta Vaughn, and Kemba Walker. The list was reduced to a final national ballot of about 20 players in March. On February 24, the Naismith Top 30 was announced, and included newcomers Johnson and South Florida guard Dominique Jones.

	Wooden	Naismith
Da’Sean Butler, WVU	✓	✓
Jerome Dyson, CONN	✓	✓
Luke Harangody, ND	✓	✓
Wesley Johnson, SYR	✓	✓
Dominique Jones, USF		✓
Greg Monroe, GTWN	✓	✓
Scottie Reynolds, VILL	✓	✓

=== Rankings ===
2009–10 Big East Conference Weekly Rankings Key: ██ Increase in ranking. ██ Decrease in ranking. RV = Received Votes
AP Poll	Pre	Wk 1	Wk 2	Wk 3	Wk 4	Wk 5	Wk 6	Wk 7	Wk 8	Wk 9	Wk 10	Wk 11	Wk 12	Wk 13	Wk 14	Wk 15	Wk 16	Wk 17	Wk 18
Cincinnati				22	19	25	RV	RV	RV										
Connecticut	12	12	13	14	14	14	11	10	13	15	RV	19							
DePaul																			
Georgetown	20	19	18	16	15	11	14	13	12	11	12	7	7	7	10	11	19	22	14
Louisville	19	20	16	20	RV											RV	RV	RV	
Marquette				RV						RV	RV		RV	RV	RV	RV	RV	RV	RV
Notre Dame	RV	RV	23	RV	RV					RV							RV	RV	RV
Pittsburgh	RV	RV	RV	RV	RV	RV	RV		23	16	9	17	22	25	19	12	17	16	18
Providence																			
Rutgers																			
St. John's				RV	RV	RV	RV	RV											
Seton Hall					RV	RV		RV											
South Florida														RV					
Syracuse	RV	RV	10	8	7	5	5	5	7	5	5	4	3	2	5	4	1	3	4
Villanova	5	5	4	3	3	8	8	8	6	4	4	3	2	4	3	7	9	10	9
West Virginia	8	8	8	7	6	6	6	6	8	10	11	9	6	5	8	8	10	7	6

=== Statistical leaders ===
The regular season team, individual, and attendance figures include all conference and non-conference games played from November 9, 2009 through March 6, 2010.

==== Team ====
Scoring Offense
Rk	Team	Games	Points	PPG
1	Villanova	30	2483	82.8
2	Providence	30	2448	81.6
3	Syracuse	31	2523	81.4
4	Seton Hall	29	2329	80.3
5	Notre Dame	31	2416	77.9

Scoring Defense
Rk	Team	Games	Points	PPG
1	Pittsburgh	31	1914	61.7
2	Marquette	30	1907	63.6
3	West Virginia	30	1945	64.8
4	Georgetown	29	1899	65.5
5	Syracuse	31	2049	66.1

Scoring Margin
Rk	Team	Offense	Defense	Margin
1	Syracuse	81.4	66.1	+15.3
2	Marquette	73.8	63.6	+10.2
3	Villanova	82.8	72.6	+10.1
4	West Virginia	74.7	64.8	+9.9
5	Georgetown	73.1	65.5	+7.6

Free throw percentage
Rk	Team	FTM	FTA	Pct
1	Villanova	595	792	.751
2	Marquette	442	593	.745
3	Notre Dame	507	694	.731
4	Georgetown	410	579	.708
5	Louisville	478	677	.706

Field goal percentage
Rk	Team	FGM	FGA	Pct
1	Syracuse	930	1806	.515
2	Georgetown	764	1535	.498
3	Notre Dame	835	1761	.474
4	Villanova	829	1792	.463
5	Marquette	768	1693	.454

3-Pt Field goal percentage
Rk	Team	3FGM	3FGA	Pct
1	Marquette	235	589	.399
2	Notre Dame	239	600	.398
3	Georgetown	181	466	.388
4	Syracuse	204	538	.379
5	Villanova	230	618	.372

Rebounding Margin
Rk	Team	Avg	Opp Avg	Marg
1	West Virginia	38.4	31.8	+6.6
2	Cincinnati	38.8	32.7	+6.1
3	Villanova	39.4	34.2	+5.2
4	Pittsburgh	37.6	32.7	+4.9
5	Notre Dame	36.4	32.4	+4.0

Offensive Rebounds
Rk	Team	Games	No.	Avg/G
1	Providence	30	512	17.1
2	West Virginia	30	467	15.6
3	Louisville	31	454	14.6
4	Seton Hall	29	413	14.2
5	Villanova	30	409	13.6

Defensive Rebounds
Rk	Team	Games	No.	Avg/G
1	Connecticut	31	817	26.4
2	Syracuse	31	813	26.2
3	Villanova	30	772	25.7
4	Cincinnati	30	764	25.5
5	Pittsburgh	31	781	25.2

Blocks
Rk	Team	Games	No.	Avg/G
1	Connecticut	31	242	7.8
2	Rutgers	31	220	7.1
3	Syracuse	31	206	6.6
4	Seton Hall	29	155	5.3
5	Georgetown	29	142	4.9

Assists
Rk	Team	Games	No.	Avg/G
1	Syracuse	31	601	19.4
2	Notre Dame	31	534	17.2
3	West Virginia	30	482	16.1
4	Pittsburgh	31	497	16.0
5	Louisville	31	481	15.5

Steals
Rk	Team	Games	No.	Avg/G
1	Syracuse	31	310	10.0
2	Marquette	30	243	8.1
3	Providence	30	240	8.0
4	Villanova	30	237	7.9
5	Louisville	31	243	7.8

==== Individual ====
Scoring
Rk	Name	GP	Pts	Avg/G
1	Luke Harangody, ND	26	607	23.3
2	Dominique Jones, USF	30	640	21.3
3	Jeremy Hazell, HALL	29	615	21.2
4	Jamine Peterson, PROV	30	571	19.0
5	Scottie Reynolds, VILL	30	564	18.8

Rebounding
Rk	Name	GP	Reb	Avg/G
1	Herb Pope, HALL	29	323	11.1
2	Jamine Peterson, PROV	30	299	10.0
3	Luke Harangody, ND	26	251	9.7
4	Greg Monroe, GTWN	29	278	9.6
5	Wesley Johnson, SYR	31	263	8.5

Assists
Rk	Name	GP	No.	Avg/G
1	Tory Jackson, ND	31	166	5.4
2	Kemba Walker, CONN	31	161	5.2
3	Andy Rautins, SYR	31	149	4.8
4	Brad Wanamaker, PITT	31	146	4.7
5	Eugene Harvey, HALL	27	127	4.7

Steals
Rk	Name	GP	No.	Avg/G
1	Andy Rautins, SYR	31	64	2.1
2	Kemba Walker, CONN	31	62	2.0
3	Lazar Hayward, MARQ	30	52	1.7
4	Wesley Johnson, SYR	31	52	1.7
5	Chris Wright, GTWN	29	48	1.7

Blocks
Rk	Name	GP	No.	Avg/G
1	Hamady N'Diaye, RUT	31	140	4.5
2	Gavin Edwards, CONN	31	66	2.1
3	Rick Jackson, SYR	31	62	2.0
4	Herb Pope, HALL	29	57	2.0
5	Gary McGhee, PITT & Wesley Johnson SYR	31	58	1.9

Field Goals
Rk	Name	FGM	FGA	PCT
1	Arinze Onuaku, SYR	152	227	.670
2	Rick Jackson, SYR	137	227	.604
3	Gavin Edwards, CONN	120	199	.603
4	Hamady N'Diaye, RUT	112	191	.586
5	Julian Vaughn, GTWN	96	168	.571

3-Pt Field Goals
Rk	Name	3PM	3PA	PCT
1	Austin Freeman, GTWN	56	117	.479
2	Darius Johnson-Odom, MARQ	66	139	.475
3	Maurice Acker, MARQ	43	92	.467
4	Tim Abromaitis, ND	80	178	.449
5	Jason Clark, GTWN	57	135	.422

Free Throws
Rk	Name	FTM	FTA	PCT
1	Ashton Gibbs, PITT	129	145	.890
2	Tim Abromaitis, ND	108	122	.885
3	Sharaud Curry, PROV	123	140	.879
4	Robert Mitchell, HALL	58	67	.866
5	Austin Freeman, GTWN	75	89	.843

==== Attendance ====
Rk	Team	Home Gms.	Home Att.	Avg. Home	Away Gms.	Away Att.	Avg. Away	Neut. Gms.	Neut. Att.	Avg. Neut.	Total Gms.	Total Att.	Avg.
1	Syracuse	19	420,890	22,152	9	117,425	13,047	3	40,270	13,423	31	578,585	18,664
2	Louisville	19	368,537	19,397	11	157,470	14,315	1	n/a	n/a	31	526,007	17,534*
3	Marquette	17	265,484	15,617	10	126,218	12,622	3	8,738	2,913	30	400,440	13,348
4	Connecticut	18	216,453	12,025	10	138,911	13,891	3	37,809	12,603	31	393,173	12,683
5	Villanova	14	153,105	10,936	12	167,586	13,966	4	35,581	8,895	30	356,272	11,876
6	Georgetown	16	192,638	12,040	11	138,845	12,622	2	8,975	4,488	29	340,458	11,740
7	Pittsburgh	18	185,209	10,289	10	122,085	12,208	3	24,277	8,092	31	331,571	10,696
8	West Virginia	15	185,629	12,375	11	115,704	10,519	4	18,621	4,655	30	319,954	10,665
9	Notre Dame	20	168,033	8,402	9	120,618	13,402	2	6,616	3,308	31	295,267	9,525
10	Providence	17	140,920	8,289	13	127,627	9,817	0	0	0	30	268,547	8,952
11	Cincinnati	16	136,471	8,529	11	106,192	9,654	3	7,200	2,400	30	249,863	8,329
12	DePaul	15	126,760	8,451	11	93,786	8,526	4	19,447	4,862	30	239,993	8,000
13	St. John's	15	82,166	5,478	11	122,369	11,124	4	28,873	7,218	30	233,408	7,780
14	Rutgers	19	99,476	5,236	10	122,118	12,212	2	8,780	4,390	31	230,374	7,431
15	Seton Hall	17	126,019	7,413	11	80,361	7,306	1	2,365	2,365	29	208,745	7,198
16	South Florida	15	74,642	4,976	10	109,318	10,932	5	7,037	1,407	30	190,997	6,367
	TOTALS	270	2,942,432	10,898	170	1,966,633	11,568	44	254,589	5,921**	484	5,163,654	10,691**
* - does not factor the one neutral game played, vs. Arkansas, which does not have an attendance figure on record. Overall average is therefore calculated based on the 30 games with attendance figures. ** - due to game without an attendance figure, overall averages are therefore calculated based on the 43 neutral games and 483 total games with attendance figures.

== Postseason ==
=== Big East tournament ===
For the second straight year, all 16 teams in the conference participated in the Big East tournament. Under this format, the teams finishing 9 through 16 in the regular season standings played first round games, while teams 5 through 8 received a bye to the second round. The top 4 teams during the regular season received a bye to the quarterfinals. The five-round tournament spanned five consecutive days, from Tuesday, March 9, through Saturday, March 13, at Madison Square Garden in New York City.

In the finals, West Virginia held of a last-minute rally by Georgetown to win the title, 60–58. Da'Sean Butler of the first-time champion Mountaineers was named Tournament Most Valuable Player. Butler hit the tournament-winning field goal, and led West Virginia in a series of dramatic games, including a buzzer-beating 3-pointer in the quarterfinals to advance the team over Cincinnati.

2010 Big East men's basketball tournament seeds and results
Seed	School	Conf.	Over.	Tiebreaker	First Round Tuesday, March 9	Second Round Wednesday, March 10	Quarterfinals Thursday, March 11	Semifinals Friday, March 12	Championship Saturday, March 13
1.	‡†Syracuse	15–3	28–4		BYE	BYE	#8 GTWN, L, 84–91		
2.	†Pittsburgh	13–5	24–8	2–1 vs. WVU/NOVA	BYE	BYE	#7 ND, L, 45–50		
3.	†West Virginia	13–5	27–6	2–2 vs. PITT/NOVA	BYE	BYE	#11 CIN, W, 54–51	#7 ND, W, 53–51	#8 GTWN, W, 60–58
4.	†Villanova	13–5	24–7	1–2 vs. PITT/WVU	BYE	BYE	#5 MARQ, L, 76–80		
5.	#Marquette	11–7	22–11	1–0 vs. LOU	BYE	#13 SJU, W, 57–55	#4 VILL, W, 80–76	#8 GTWN, L, 57–80	
6.	#Louisville	11–7	20–12	0–1 vs. MARQ	BYE	#11 CIN, L, 66–69			
7.	#Notre Dame	10–8	23–11	1–0 vs. GTWN	BYE	#10 HALL, W, 68–56	#2 PITT, W, 50–45	#3 WVU, L, 51–53	
8.	#Georgetown	10–8	23–10	0–1 vs. ND	BYE	#9 USF, W, 69–49	#1 SYR, W, 91–84	#5 MARQ, W, 80–57	#3 WVU, L, 58–60
9.	South Florida	9–9	20–12	1–0 vs. HALL	#16 DEP, W, 58–49	#8 GTWN, L, 69–49			
10.	Seton Hall	9–9	19–12	0–1 vs. USF	#15 PROV, W, 109–106	#7 ND, L, 56–68			
11.	Cincinnati	7–11	18–15	2–0 vs. CONN	#14 RUT, W, 69–68	#6 LOU, W, 69–66	#3 WVU, L, 51–54		
12.	Connecticut	7–11	17–15	0–2 vs. CIN	#13 SJU, L, 51–73				
13.	St. John's	6–12	17–15		#12 CONN, W, 73–51	#5 MARQ, L, 57–55			
14.	Rutgers	5–13	15–17		#11 CIN, L, 68–69				
15.	Providence	4–14	12–19		#10 HALL, L, 106–109				
16.	DePaul	1–17	8–23		#9 USF, L, 49–58				
‡ – Big East regular season champions, and tournament No. 1 seed. † – Received a double-bye in the conference tournament. # – Received a single-bye in the conference tournament. Overall records include all games through the Big East tournament.

=== NCAA tournament ===
The Big East secured eight bids into the NCAA tournament, tying its own Division I record, achieved in both 2006 and 2008. As the Big East tournament champion, West Virginia received an automatic bid into the tournament, while the remaining seven teams all received at-large bids. Syracuse achieved its first #1 seed since 1980, when it lost to #5 seed Iowa in the Sweet Sixteen. These teams combined for 8 wins and eight losses, as two teams reached the Sweet Sixteen, and West Virginia reached the Final Four.

Seed	Region	School	First Round	Second Round	Sweet 16	Elite Eight	Final Four	Championship
2	East	West Virginia	#15 Morgan State, W, 77–50	#10 Missouri, W, 68–59	#11 Washington, W, 68–59	#1 Kentucky, W, 73–66	#1 Duke, L, 57–78	
1	West	Syracuse	#16 Vermont, W, 79–56	#8 Gonzaga, W, 87–65	#5 Butler, L, 68–75			
3	West	Pittsburgh	#14 Oakland (MI), W, 89–66	#6 Xavier, L, 68–71				
2	South	Villanova	#15 Robert Morris, W, 73–70^{OT}	#10 St. Mary's, L, 59–63				
3	Midwest	Georgetown	#14 Ohio University, L, 83–97					
9	South	Louisville	#8 California, L, 62–77					
6	East	Marquette	#11 Washington, L, 78–80					
6	South	Notre Dame	#11 Old Dominion, L, 50–51					
	8 Bids	W-L (%):	4–4 (.500)	2–2 (.500)	1–1 (.500)	1–0 (1.000)	0–1 (.000)	TOTAL: 8–8 (.500)

=== National Invitation tournament ===
The Big East received five bids into the National Invitation Tournament, combining for 2 wins and 5 losses. Only two teams, Cincinnati and Connecticut, advanced to the second round, both losing in their respective matchups.

== Awards and honors ==
=== Conference awards and teams ===
The following individuals received postseason honors after having been chosen by the Big East Conference coaches:

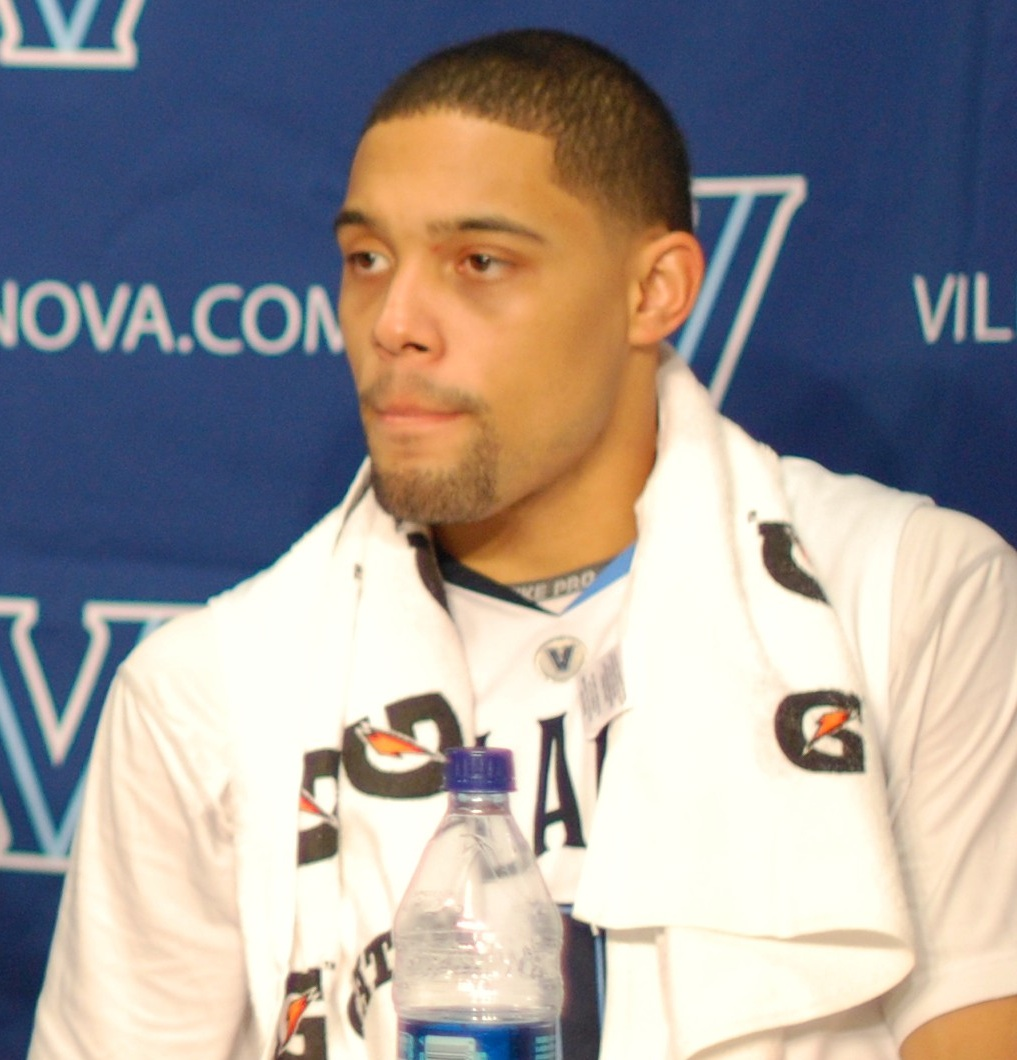
Scottie Reynolds, the unanimous First Team All-Big East selection.

2010 Big East Men's Basketball Individual Awards
Award	Recipient(s)
Player of the Year	Wesley Johnson, F., SYRACUSE
Coach of the Year	Jim Boeheim, SYRACUSE
Defensive Player of the Year	Hamady N'Diaye, C., RUTGERS
Rookie of the Year	Lance Stephenson, G., CINCINNATI
Scholar-Athlete of the Year	Tim Abromaitis, G., NOTRE DAME
Most Improved Player	Ashton Gibbs, G., PITTSBURGH
Sixth Man of the Year	Kris Joseph, F., SYRACUSE
Sportsmanship Award	Tory Jackson, G., NOTRE DAME

2010 All-Big East Men's Basketball Teams
First Team	Second Team	Third Team	Honorable Mention	All-Rookie Team
Greg Monroe, C., GTWN; Luke Harangody, F., ND; Dominique Jones, G., USF; Wesley Johnson, F., SYR; Scottie Reynolds†, G., VILL; Da'Sean Butler, F., WVU	Austin Freeman, G., GTWN; Lazar Hayward, F., MARQ; Ashton Gibbs, G., PITT; Jeremy Hazell, G., HALL; Andy Rautins, G., SYR	Jerome Dyson, G., CONN; Kemba Walker, G., CONN; Samardo Samuels, F., LOU; Corey Fisher, G., VILL; Devin Ebanks, F., WVU	Jimmy Butler, F., MARQ; Tim Abromaitis, F., ND; Jamine Peterson, F., PROV	Lance Stephenson†, G., CIN; Alex Oriakhi, F/C., CONN; Vincent Council, G., PROV; Dane Miller†, F., RUT; Brandon Triche, G., SYR; Maalik Wayns, G., VILL
† - denotes unanimous selection

Awardees are chosen by a simple ballot, in which coaches are not allowed to vote for their players or themselves (in the case of the Big East Coach of the Year). Coaches voted for Big East Player of the Year and Rookie of the Year from the first team and all-rookie lists, respectively.

Notable members of the first team include Notre Dame senior forward Luke Harangody, who was named to the team for the third-straight year, Villanova senior guard Scottie Reynolds, who was the only player to receive a unanimous selection. Also of note was Syracuse junior forward Wesley Johnson, who was given no all-conference consideration prior to the start of the season, yet helped lead the Orange to a surprising eighth regular season conference title, and received both first team and Big East Player of the Year honors. Notably absent from all lists was preseason first-team pick Deonta Vaughn, a senior guard from Cincinnati, who led the team in assists and finished second in points.

=== National awards and teams ===
==== Players ====
Two Big East players, Wesley Johnson of Syracuse and Scottie Reynolds of Villanova were named to the 2010 Consensus All-America First Team, while Luke Harangody of Notre Dame was named to the Second Team. Both Johnson and Reynolds were also named to the AP, USBWA, and NABC First Team All-America selections. Reynolds was also named to the TSN First-Team, while Johnson was named to its Second-Team.

==== Coaches ====
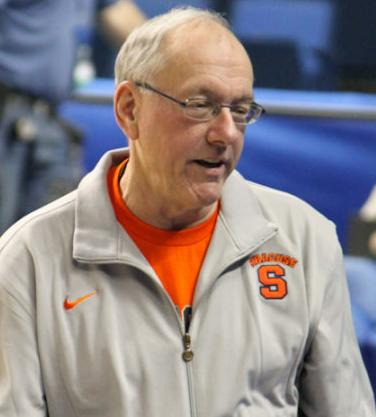
Jim Boeheim.

Jim Boeheim, Syracuse:

- Naismith College Coach of the Year
- AP Coach of the Year
- NABC Coach of the Year
- Henry Iba Coach of the Year, from the United States Basketball Writers Association
- The Sporting News National Coach of the Year
- FoxSports.com National Coach of the Year
- Yahoo! Sports National Coach of the Year

== See also ==
- 2009–10 NCAA Division I men's basketball season
- 2009–10 Cincinnati Bearcats men's basketball team
- 2009–10 Connecticut Huskies men's basketball team
- 2009–10 Georgetown Hoyas men's basketball team
- 2009–10 Louisville Cardinals men's basketball team
- 2009–10 Marquette Golden Eagles men's basketball team
- 2009–10 Notre Dame Fighting Irish men's basketball team
- 2009–10 Pittsburgh Panthers men's basketball team
- 2009–10 Providence Friars men's basketball team
- 2009–10 South Florida Bulls men's basketball team
- 2009–10 Syracuse Orange men's basketball team
- 2009–10 Villanova Wildcats men's basketball team
- 2009–10 West Virginia Mountaineers men's basketball team
