= 2009–10 Georgetown Hoyas men's basketball team =

American college basketball season

2009–10 Georgetown Hoyas men's basketball

NCAA tournament, Round of 64
- Conference: Big East Conference

Ranking
- AP: No. 14
- Record: 23–11 (10–8 Big East)
- Head coach: John Thompson III (6th season)
- Assistant coaches: Kenya Hunter (3rd season); David Cox (3rd season); Mike Brennan (1st season)
- Captains: Austin Freeman; Chris Wright
- Home arena: Verizon Center

2009–10 Big East men's basketball standings
	Conf.				Overall
Team	W		L	PCT	W		L	PCT
No. 4 Syracuse	15	–	3	.833	30	–	5	.857
No. 6 West Virginia †	13	–	5	.722	31	–	7	.816
No. 9 Villanova	13	–	5	.722	25	–	8	.758
No. 18 Pittsburgh	13	–	5	.722	25	–	9	.735
Marquette	11	–	7	.611	22	–	12	.647
Louisville	11	–	7	.611	20	–	13	.606
No. 14 Georgetown	10	–	8	.556	23	–	11	.676
Notre Dame	10	–	8	.556	23	–	12	.657
South Florida	9	–	9	.500	20	–	13	.606
Seton Hall	9	–	9	.500	19	–	13	.594
Cincinnati	7	–	11	.389	19	–	16	.543
Connecticut	7	–	11	.389	18	–	16	.529
St. John's	6	–	12	.333	17	–	16	.515
Rutgers	5	–	13	.278	15	–	17	.469
Providence	4	–	14	.222	12	–	19	.387
DePaul	1	–	17	.056	8	–	23	.258
† 2010 Big East tournament winner As of April 3, 2010; Rankings from AP Poll

The 2009–10 Georgetown Hoyas men's basketball team represented Georgetown University in the 2009–2010 NCAA Division I basketball season. The Hoyas were coached by John Thompson III and played their home games at the Verizon Center in Washington, D.C. The Hoyas were members of the Big East Conference. They finished the season 23–11, 10–8 in Big East play. They advanced to the championship game of the 2010 Big East men's basketball tournament before losing to West Virginia. They received an at-large bid to the 2010 NCAA Division I men's basketball tournament, earning a 3 seed in the Midwest Region, where they were upset by 14 seed Ohio in the first round.

== Season recap ==
=== Regular season ===
The Hoyas′ previous season had been a disappointing one in which the relatively young and experienced Georgetown team had fallen from a Top Ten ranking in early January 2009 to a 16–15 finish in March that ended with the loss of 12 out of 16 games and first-round exits from both the 2009 Big East tournament and the 2009 National Invitation Tournament. The Hoyas had lost starting forward DaJuan Summers after the end of the season when he chose to forego his senior year of college and enter the 2009 National Basketball Association draft, as well as starting guard Jessie Sapp, who graduated, and reserve guard/forward Omar Wattad, who transferred. But with freshman forwards Jerrelle Benimon and Hollis Thompson joining the team and sophomore starting center Greg Monroe, junior reserve center Henry Sims, junior starting guards Austin Freeman and Chris Wright, junior reserve forward Julian Vaughn, and sophomore reserve forward Jason Clark all returning, the Hoyas expected to bounce back in 2009–10. The preseason Associated Press Poll ranked them No. 20.

==== Non-conference schedule ====
The season began with six straight wins over unranked opponents. Greg Monroe had a double-double (18 points and 11 rebounds) in the season opener at Tulane and 11 points and nine rebounds in the low-scoring home opener against Temple, which saw Georgetown blow a 12-point lead in the second half before eking out a victory that broke Temple's streak of 68 straight wins when holding opponents to under 50 points. Against Savannah State, a team coached by former Georgetown player Horace Broadnax, Monroe had 13 points. Austin Freeman scored 16 points at Tulane and 12 points at Savannah State, while Chris Wright scored 11 points each at Tulane and at Savannah State and 15 against Temple. Jason Clark came off the bench to score 13 points at Tulane and a game-high and career-high 14 at Savannah State, a game in which he connected on four three-pointers.

Clark started a week later in the first game of a three-game homestand, a rout of Lafayette – the first game between the schools since December 1979 – and had another game and career high, scoring 19 points, while Hollis Thompson had 16 points, Chris Wright finished with 14, Greg Monroe had 13 points, nine rebounds, and six assists, Austin Freeman added 12 points, and Julian Vaughn finished with 11 points in the first game since John Thompson III became head coach in 2004 in which six Hoyas scored in double figures. Against Mount St. Mary's at the end of November, Greg Monroe had a double-double with a season-high 19 points and 11 rebounds, Chris Wright and Julian Vaughn had career highs in scoring – Wright with 18 points and Vaughn with 14 – and Jason Clark started again and added 12. In an easy win over American five days later, the Hoyas limited the Eagles to 27-percent shooting from the field and Chris Wright and Henry Sims each scored 12 points – the first time Sims scored in double figures in his college career – and Julian Vaughn contributed 11 points, while Greg Monroe had nine points, a career-high 13 rebounds, and four blocked shots.

As the winning streak continued, the Hoyas rose in the national rankings, to No. 19 in the AP Poll by the time of the Temple game, to No. 18 when they met Lafayette, to No. 16 in time for the game against Mount St. Mary's, and to No. 15 after beating American. They then traveled to Madison Square Garden to make Georgetown's first appearance in the Jimmy V Classic and face their first ranked opponent of the season, No. 22 Butler. Greg Monroe played an outstanding defensive game that contributed to Butler junior forward Matt Howard shooting only 1-for-9 from the field and scoring only nine points. Monroe also shot 9-for-20 (45 percent) from the field and had his third double-double of the season, with career highs in both points (24) and rebounds (15), while Austin Freeman went 4-for-5 in three-point attempts and scored 18 points. The Hoyas led 39–31 at halftime and stretched their lead to 52–35 after Freeman scored on two three-point shots and Hollis Thompson hit a third three-pointer with 13:35 to play. The Bulldogs scored the next seven points to close to 52–42 as the Hoyas failed to score during a 4:13 stretch, finally broken by a monster Monroe dunk that made it 54–42. Butler then scored five more unanswered points to close to 54–47 with 8:37 remaining, and the Bulldogs were behind only 68–62 in the final minute before Georgetown prevailed in an 82–65 win. Georgetown outrebounded Butler 43–30 and outscored the Bulldogs 30–16 inside, and the loss was Butler's third in a row against ranked teams and eighth in its last nine games against the Top 25 – but the Bulldogs were destined to advance to the National Championship Game in the 2010 NCAA tournament four months later.

Georgetown next went to Anaheim, California, to make its only appearance in the John R. Wooden Classic and face its second ranked opponent in a row, No. 17 Washington, led by sophomore forward Isaiah Thomas, in the first meeting of the schools. The game was tight through the first half, with the Hoyas clinging to a 30–29 lead at halftime. However, Georgetown scored the first 12 points of the second half before Thomas made a layup with 15:56 remaining in the game for Washington's first points since halftime, and the Hoyas then went on a 9–0 run to stretch their lead to 51–31 with less than 14 minutes remaining. Georgetown still led 60–40 with 6½ minutes to play, but the Huskies took advantage of a 23-point performance by senior forward Quincy Pondexter and 21 points – 15 of them in the second half – by Thomas to stage a late comeback try that included a 15–3 run. Washington closed to 69–63 with 27 seconds remaining, but Chris Wright and Hollis Thompson hit key free throws that ensured the Hoyas a 74–66 victory that stretched their season-opening winning streak to eight. Julian Vaughn – the only Georgetown starter averaging fewer than 12 points per game – scored a career-high 18 points on 7-for-9 shooting from the field, Greg Monroe added 15 points and grabbed seven rebounds, and the Hoyas forced the Huskies to commit 25 turnovers.

Ranked No. 11, Georgetown returned to Washington, D.C., to play its last two non-conference games of the season, meeting Old Dominion and Harvard. Three years earlier, Old Dominion had upset the Hoyas to become the first team to beat Georgetown in a game at McDonough Gymnasium since 1982, and in a return to McDonough on December 19 – the season's only game there, played on a day when Georgetown University was closed due to a snowstorm – the Monarchs took advantage of a slow start by the Hoyas to again upset Georgetown, dealing the Hoyas their first setback of the season and remaining the only team to defeat Georgetown at McDonough over the course of nearly 28 years. Greg Monroe had a game-high 15 points and grabbed seven rebounds, while Austin Freeman and Julian Vaughn each contributed 13 points, with Freeman pulling down six rebounds and Vaughn grabbing seven. Falling to No. 14 in the AP Poll after the loss, Georgetown had an easier time in a victory over Harvard at the Verizon Center four days later in which Chris Wright scored a career-high 34 points, Austin Freeman scored 21, and Greg Monroe had a double-double with 16 points and a career-high 16 rebounds.

Meanwhile, reserve forward Nikita Mescheriakov, averaging only five minutes per game, announced on December 22 that he would leave Georgetown at the end of the semester in search of greater playing time; he transferred to Wake Forest in January. Mescheriakov became the ninth player in five years to leave Georgetown before the end of his college eligibility: Jeff Green and DaJuan Summers both had left school after their junior year to enter the National Basketball Association draft, and Omar Wattad, Vernon Macklin, Jeremiah Rivers, Octavius Spann, Marc Egerson, and Josh Thornton all had transferred. Mescheriakov's departure left the Hoyas with only 11 players on their roster, two of them walk-ons.

==== Conference schedule ====
Climbing to No. 13 in the AP Poll with a record of 9–1, the Hoyas opened their Big East Conference schedule on New Year's Eve 2009 by hosting St. John's, followed by visits in the new year of 2010 to DePaul and Marquette. The Hoyas pulled ahead of St. John's in the first half before the Red Storm took a narrow lead halfway through the second half, but the Hoyas ultimately prevailed with a balanced scoring attack that saw Chris Wright score 21 points and Austin Freeman and Greg Monroe contribute 15 each. Another win followed against DePaul, the Hoyas′ ninth victory in a row against the Blue Demons and DePaul's 21st straight loss in a Big East Conference game, with Georgetown shooting 57 percent from the field and four Hoyas – Chris Wright with 18 points, Austin Freeman with 17, Jason Clark with 13, and Greg Monroe with 10 – scoring in double figures. Marquette, however, upset the by-then-No. 12 Hoyas on January 6, dealing them their first conference defeat of the season in a close game in which Austin Freeman scored 20 points, Julian Vaughn had 12, and Greg Monroe scored nine points and grabbed 10 rebounds in a losing cause.

The Hoyas returned to the Verizon Center for a two-game homestand. In the first game, they hosted their first ranked conference opponent of the season, No. 13 Connecticut. The game was close at first, with the Huskies clinging to a 20–19 lead with 8:38 to play in the first half. Then the Georgetown offense went into a deep slump: While Connecticut scored 16 unanswered points, the Hoyas did not score again until Greg Monroe hit a pair of free throws with 4:30 left in the half, by which time Connecticut had built a 34–21 lead. Connecticut then went on a 6–0 run to take a 40–21 lead before Chris Wright connected on a two-point jumper with 45 seconds left until halftime – ending a 9½-minute stretch in which the Hoyas missed 11 consecutive shots from the field and saw their shooting effort for the game drop to 6-for-25 (24 percent) – to allow Georgetown to close to 40–23. The Hoyas went into the locker room at the break down 41–25, but Austin Freeman – who scored 28 of his career-high and game-high 33 points in the second half and also pulled down seven rebounds – led a Hoya comeback. With Connecticut leading 45–34 with 16:44 left to play, Freeman scored on a three-point jumper that sparked a 10–0 Georgetown run in which he scored eight points, allowing the Hoyas to close to 45–41 with 14:57 remaining. The Huskies managed to pull ahead to a lead of as many as seven points, but the Hoyas again closed the gap, and a Freeman three-pointer put Georgetown ahead 66–65 with 3:09 remaining. The game stayed tight, but Connecticut did not score a field goal during the final 3½ minutes, and a Julian Vaughn two-pointer put Georgetown ahead for good at 70–69 with 44 seconds left. In the end the Hoyas pulled off a 72–69 come-from-behind victory to avoid an upset. Greg Monroe had a double-double (15 points and 10 rebounds), and Chris Wright scored 14 points. Ranked No. 11 by the time they met Seton Hall five days later, the Hoyas put heavy defensive pressure on the Pirates's highest-scoring player, Jeremy Hazell, and won easily, with Chris Wright scoring 21 points, Jason Clark rebounding from a scoreless outing against Connecticut to score a career-high 20 points, Austin Freeman adding 16 points, and Julian Vaughn contributing 13, while Greg Monroe had an eight-point, nine-rebound game. The win gave Georgetown a perfect 8–0 record at the Verizon Center for the season.

Georgetown next went on the road as the underdog to face No. 4 Villanova, which had won six straight games. The Hoyas led 15–14 in the first half when the Wildcats went on a 14–0 run to take a 28–15 lead, and at halftime Villanova led 46–31. In the second half, Austin Freeman scored 10 points in the first 3:38 of play as the Hoyas began to eat into Villanova's lead. An offensive lull in the middle of the second half in which the two teams combined to miss 20 straight shots over a 6-minute-12-second stretch ended with a Greg Monroe field goal that tied the game at 67–67 with 4:36 left in the game. After Villanova pulled ahead 69–67 with 4:15 remaining, Monroe again tied the game, at 69–69, with 4:01 left. Shooting only 39.3 percent from the field for the game, the Hoyas made only one more field goal the rest of the way, and a field goal by Villanova senior guard Scottie Reynolds – who led the Wildcats with a game-high 27 points – put the Wildcats ahead for good at 71–69. Georgetown's final score, another Monroe field goal, closed the gap to 80–77 with 9.6 seconds left, but two Villanova free throws with 6.9 seconds remaining – part of an 8-for-8 Villanova performance from the free throw line in the final 36 seconds – clinched an 82–77 win for the Wildcats, breaking a five-game losing streak against Georgetown. In a losing cause, Greg Monroe had a double-double (29 points and 16 rebounds), while Austin Freeman had 22 points and Jason Clark scored 16.

Falling to No. 12 in the AP Poll, Georgetown next faced another ranked opponent, No. 9 Pittsburgh, in another road game. The Panthers were tough at home – they had compiled a 125–10 record on their home court at the Petersen Events Center since the venue opened in 2002, and Georgetown had beaten them there only once, in January 2005 – and they entered the game having won 31 straight games at home and with an eight-game winning streak overall. Georgetown made its first five three-pointers of the game and led by 19–11 and 25–17, but much of the game was close, with the score tied at 31–31 at halftime and Pittsburgh clinging to a 56–54 lead in the second half with 7:48 left to play. But Georgetown, playing tough defense that largely contained Pittsburgh's top-scoring players during the game, then went on a decisive 9–0 run during which Chris Wright put the Hoyas ahead for good at 59–56 with a three-pointer. By the time the run was over, the Hoyas led 63–56. Pittsburgh cut the Georgetown lead to 63–58 with 3:48 remaining, but the Hoyas hung on to upset the Panthers 74–66. The Panthers suffered only their third loss in 13 games against ranked opponents at the Petersen Events Center, and Georgetown became the only team other than Louisville to defeat Pittsburgh twice there. Chris Wright had 27 points, Greg Monroe had 13 points and nine rebounds, Austin Freeman also scored 13, and Julian Vaughn contributed 11.

An easy win over Rutgers followed in which Greg Monroe shot 10-for-12 (83.3 percent) from the floor had another double-double (21 points and 10 rebounds), while Chris Wright went 4-for-5 from three-point range and scored 16 points and Austin Freeman scored 14. The victory extended the Hoyas′ winning streak against the Scarlet Knights to eight. Climbing to No.7 in the AP Poll, Georgetown went on the road again to face another ranked opponent, No. 4 Syracuse the winners of seven straight games. It was the first time since March 1990 that the two teams met while both were ranked in the Top Ten. The Hoyas began the game with a 14–0 run over the first three minutes, hitting their first four three-pointers, but the Orange battled back to only a two-point deficit with 8:19 left in the first half time, and Syracuse had a 34–29 lead at halftime. Syracuse began the second half with a decisive 18–8 run that saw the Orange build a lead of 43–33 with 16:10 left to play and culminate. in a 52–37 Syracuse lead with 12:37 remaining. Austin Freeman led the Hoyas with 23 points, and Jason Clark scored 15, but Syracuse won 73–56, giving head coach Jim Boeheim his 819th career victory, making him sixth all-time in victories among NCAA Division I college basketball coaches. In improving to 20–1, the Orange also clinched Boeheim's 32nd season with at least 20 victories in his 34 years as head coach at Syracuse. The loss extended Georgetown's losing streak to Syracuse in games played at the Carrier Dome to six.

The Hoyas returned to the Verizon Center to begin a three-game homestand by meeting No. 8 Duke in a nonconference game five days later with President Barack Obama and Vice President Joe Biden in the audience. Shooting 77 percent from the floor in the first half, the Hoyas used an 18–3 run in which they held the Blue Devils without a field goal for nearly four minutes to jump out to what turned out to be a decisive 34–20 lead. With Georgetown leading 46–33 at the beginning of the second half, Duke made two three-pointers to cut the lead to seven, but the Hoyas responded with a 6–0 run to stretch the lead back to 13. Duke closed again to 52–45, but Georgetown again extended the lead and went on to win 89–77. Chris Wright shot 8-for-9 from the floor and scored 21 points; Greg Monroe also scored 21, and Austin Freeman added 20 points. The Hoyas shot 71.7 percent from the floor for the game, the third-best team shooting performance in Georgetown history and the best since Georgetown shot 71.9 percent against St. John's in 1980; it was also the second-highest shooting percentage ever against Duke, exceeded only by a 73.3 percent shooting performance against the Blue Devils by UCLA in 1965. The victory was John Thompson III's 200th career win as a college head coach.

Unfortunately for Georgetown, a shocking upset followed the win over Duke, as the No. 7 Hoyas resumed conference play by losing to South Florida, a team which three days earlier also had upset No. 17 Pittsburgh. The Hoyas blew a first-half 13-point lead, their offense going cold in the second half, resulting in arguably the biggest win in the history of Bulls basketball. Greg Monroe and Austin Freeman each scored 21 points and Monroe grabbed eight rebounds in the loss. The Hoyas then faced No. 2 Villanova – a team that had beaten them in January, had not yet lost a conference game during the season, and was riding an 11-game winning streak – on February 6. Although about two feet (61 cm) of snow had fallen in Washington, D.C., that day, 10,387 fans – including Speaker of the United States House of Representatives Nancy Pelosi and former National Football League commissioner and Georgetown basketball player Paul Tagliabue – showed up at the Verizon Center for the game, some of the students in attendance having walked three miles (4.8 km) from the Georgetown campus. During the first half, the Hoyas forced 16 Villanova turnovers and limited the Wildcats to 12 field goals. A 15–2 Georgetown run gave the Hoyas a 34–20 lead, and a 16–4 Georgetown run followed to stretch the lead to 50–27, which Villanova cut to 50–31 at halftime. In the second half, Villanova scored 59 points and committed only two turnovers, and early in the half twice closed to a 13-point deficit, but the Hoyas then stretched their lead to 76–55 with 9:13 left to play. The Wildcats followed that with a 13–3 run of their own to close to 79–68 and later got as close as 81–71, but the Hoyas added to their lead again and ultimately upset Villanova 103–90. Georgetown went 39-for-50 (78 percent) from the foul line during the game, and making half of those free throws in the second half helped the Hoyas protect their lead against Villanova's second-half offensive surge. Austin Freeman scored a game-high 25 points and Jason Clark had 24, while Greg Monroe shot 11-for-14 (78.6 percent) from the field, scoring 19 points, pulling down eight rebounds, and making six assists. Julian Vaughn contributed 13 points and Hollis Thompson came off the bench to add 12.

Still ranked No. 7 and sporting records of 17–5 overall and 7–5 in the Big East, the Hoyas next went on a two-game road trip that yielded mixed results – a win at Providence followed by an upset loss at Rutgers that was the Scarlet Knights′ first victory over a Top Ten team in seven years. At Providence, Chris Wright scored 21 points, Julian Vaughn had a career-high 19 points, Austin Freeman added 17, and Greg Monroe had a double-double (12 points and 12 assists) and seven rebounds, while at Rutgers Monroe had 19 points, eight rebounds, and six assists and Austin Freeman scored 17 points. Dropping to No. 10 in the AP Poll, they then returned to the Verizon Center to face No. 5 Syracuse. Syracuse started out with a dominating performance, making five of six shots from the field to start the game and take a 13–2 lead in the first 3 minutes 51 seconds. Georgetown closed to 15–6, but five straight points by Syracuse senior guard Andy Rautins – who had a season-high 26 points in the game – put the Orange ahead 20–6. The Hoyas followed with a 12–2 run to close to 22–18, but Syracuse responded with a 9–2 run of its own to take a 31–20 lead. Syracuse's final nine points of the first half stretched the Orange's lead to 16 points, and the teams went to the locker room at the half with Syracuse ahead 44–31. In the second half, Syracuse stretched its lead to 60–37 with 12:37 remaining to play, but made only three more field goals during the last 12 minutes of the game. Meanwhile, the Hoyas began a comeback upset bid that started with a 10–0 run. After Rautins finally answered with a three-pointer, the Hoyas scored twice more to close to 63–51 with 7½ minutes left in the game. Rautins sank two free throws to make it 65–51, but Georgetown then scored nine straight points to close to 65–60, and after Austin Freeman scored five straight points Georgetown only trailed 67–65 with 3:12 left in the game. By the time 1:10 was left to play, Syracuse was clinging to a 71–70 lead, but the Orange held on to win 75–71, the first time Georgetown had lost two games in a row during the season. Austin Freeman led the Hoyas with 21 points and six rebounds, while Chris Wright and Greg Monroe each scored 20 and Monroe also pulled down nine rebounds.

Falling to No. 11 in the AP Poll, the Hoyas broke their two-game losing streak by coming from behind with a second-half offensive surge to beat Louisville in a game in which Austin Freeman scored 29 points – 24 of them in the second half – and Greg Monroe had a double-double (16 points and 14 rebounds. Four days later, however, Notre Dame upset them at the Verizon Center – Notre Dame's second straight win over a Top 25 team – dropping the Hoyas to 19–7 overall and 9–7 in the Big East. Against the Fighting Irish, Greg Monroe scored 15 points and Jason Clark and Hollis Thompson each scored 12, but Georgetown's leading scorer Austin Freeman, averaging 17.7 points per game, was suffering from what at the time was thought to be gastroenteritis and Notre Dame held him to only five points.

Having lost three of their last four games, the Hoyas had dropped to No. 19 in the AP Poll by the time they met No. 10 West Virginia on March 1 with Austin Freeman missing the game to go to a hospital, where he was found not to be suffering from gastroenteritis, but rather from diabetes. The Hoyas missed his offense and, although Greg Monroe had 22 points and nine rebounds and Chris Wright scored 21 points, the Mountaineers never trailed after the game's first four minutes and led by as many as 27 points in the first half, by 43–26 at halftime, and by 53–26 with 16:51 left to play in the game. Georgetown managed to close to 62–53 with 5:55 left, but for the final 3:37 of the game West Virginia never led by less than double digits. Although West Virginia shot only 43 percent from the field, the Mountaineers scored 24 points off 20 Georgetown turnovers and outscored the Hoyas 27–14 in free throws.

Losers of four of their last five, the Hoyas finished their regular season with an easy win over Cincinnati at the Verizon Center in which Austin Freeman – monitored closely by the team physician – returned to action to score 24 points, Greg Monroe had a double-double (19 points and 15 rebounds), and Chris Wright scored 16. Georgetown finished the regular season with a record of 20–9 overall, a conference record of 10–8 that tied them with Notre Dame for seventh place in the Big East, and a ranking of No. 19 in the AP Poll.

=== Big East tournament ===
Losing four of the final six games of the regular season caused Georgetown – ranked No. 7 in mid-February – to fall to No. 22 in the AP Poll by the time the 2010 Big East tournament began in the second week of March. Tiebreaking criteria gave Notre Dame the seventh seed in the tournament and relegated Georgetown to the eighth seed, but that was high enough for the Hoyas to receive a bye in the tournament's first round. In the second round they met the No. 9 seed, South Florida, which had beaten Georgetown in their only regular-season meeting. The Hoyas defense clamped down on the Bulls, holding them to 29.1 percent shooting from the field, a season low for South Florida. Meanwhile, Jason Clark and Greg Monroe each scored 16 points and Chris Wright added 15 as Georgetown cruised to a 69–49 victory, the Hoyas′ first win in a postseason tournament since 2008.

In the quarterfinals, Georgetown faced No. 3 Syracuse, which had lost its final game of the regular season to Louisville but had received a bye in both the first and second rounds. The game was the 13th Big East tournament game between the teams, the most between any two Big East teams in the tournament's 31-year history, and each team had won six of the previous meetings. This time, Syracuse, with a 28–3 record, was the tournament's No. 1 seed, had not lost two games in a row all season, and had defeated Georgetown twice in regular-season play. Georgetown pulled out to an early 14–11 lead, but the Orange tied the game and pulled ahead, where they would remain for the next 21 minutes of play, including a 40–37 advantage at halftime. A Syracuse offensive spurt in the second half gave the Orange a nine-point advantage with 13:43 left in the game, but then the Hoyas began an offensive surge in which they outscored Syracuse 19–2, including a 13–0 run at one point. During the surge, Georgetown freshman reserve guard Vee Sanford scored to give the Hoyas a 60–59 lead with 10:37 left to play – their first lead since 14–11 – and by the time the 19–2 run ended, Georgetown led 70–61 with 7:24 remaining in the game. Syracuse responded with an offensive push of its own, cutting Georgetown's lead to 74–72, but the Hoyas then outscored the Orange 11–4 to take an 85–76 lead with 1:39 remaining. Georgetown went on to upset Syracuse 91–84, the first time the Orange had lost two games in a row all season and only the sixth team in Big East tournament history that a top seed had lost its tournament opener. Although Syracuse's bench outscored Georgetown's 37–10, the Hoyas made up for it by shooting 57.9 percent from the field. Chris Wright led the team with a game-high 27 points and Austin Freeman scored 18, while Jason Clark contributed 17 points and Greg Monroe had a double-double (15 points and 10 rebounds) and a team-high seven assists.

Georgetown advanced to the semi-finals to meet fifth-seeded Marquette, another team that had beaten the Hoyas in their only regular-season meeting. The Hoyas scored on their first six field goal attempts and quickly pulled ahead to a 15–4 lead, but the Golden Eagles′ offense came alive and went on a 15–5 run that tied the game at 29–29. Georgetown led 37–34 at halftime and 56–51 with 10:48 left in the game, but after that the Hoyas went on a decisive 14–1 run that stretched their lead to 70–53. The Hoyas cruised to an 80–57 victory, dealing the Golden Eagles their first double-digit loss of the season. Greg Monroe had one of the best all-around performances of his college career with another double-double (23 points and 13 rebounds) and seven assists, while Chris Wright and Jason Clark each scored 15 points and Austin Freeman added 12 points and eight rebounds.

Georgetown appeared in the Big East tournament championship game for the first time since 2008, where it faced the tournament's third seed, No. 7 West Virginia. West Virginia had won six in a row and eight of nine entering the game and was making only its second appearance in the tournament championship game. The first half was close, and West Virginia led 32–28 at halftime. The Mountaineers held their lead through most of the second half, stretching it to as many as nine points before the Hoyas began to close the gap, and Austin Freeman tied the score at 56–56 with a three-pointer with 54 seconds left to play. Chris Wright fouled West Virginia junior guard Joe Mazzulla, who hit two free throws with 27 seconds remaining to give the Mountaineers a 58–56 lead, but Wright then scored on a jumper to tie the game again at 58–58 with 17 seconds left to play. After a timeout, West Virginia senior forward Da'Sean Butler, who had 20 points during the game, scored in the lane with 4.2 seconds left to give the Mountaineers a 60–58 lead. Chris Wright drove the length of the court and missed a final shot at the buzzer, and West Virginia won its first Big East tournament championship. Chris Wright scored 20 points, Austin Freeman had 14, and Greg Monroe contributed 11.

=== NCAA tournament ===
Georgetown's deep Big East tournament run gave the Hoyas a 23–10 record and made the case for the team's inclusion in the 2010 NCAA tournament. Georgetown was seeded third in the Midwest Regional in the Hoyas′ first appearance in the tournament since 2008. Observers considered the Hoyas a legitimate Final Four threat, and Georgetown was the heavy favorite in its first-round game against 14th-seeded Ohio, a team that had posted a losing regular-season record in the Mid-American Conference (MAC) but had earned a tournament berth by winning the MAC tournament championship. The day before the game, John Thompson III said that the Hoyas were playing their best basketball of the season, but behind a 32-point effort by junior guard Armon Bassett, 23 points by freshman guard D. J. Cooper, and a strong team three-point shooting performance, the Bobcats jumped out to an early lead that Georgetown was never able to close. Ohio led 48–36 at halftime and by as many as 19 points in the second half, and a second-half Georgetown offensive surge got the Hoyas no closer than seven points despite Chris Wright's team-leading 28 points, Greg Monroe's double-double (19 points and 13 rebounds), and Hollis Thompson's 16-point performance. Ohio cruised to a shocking 97–83 upset victory, the first time the Bobcats had won an NCAA tournament game since 1983, and Georgetown's season came to a sudden and unexpected end.

=== Wrap-up ===
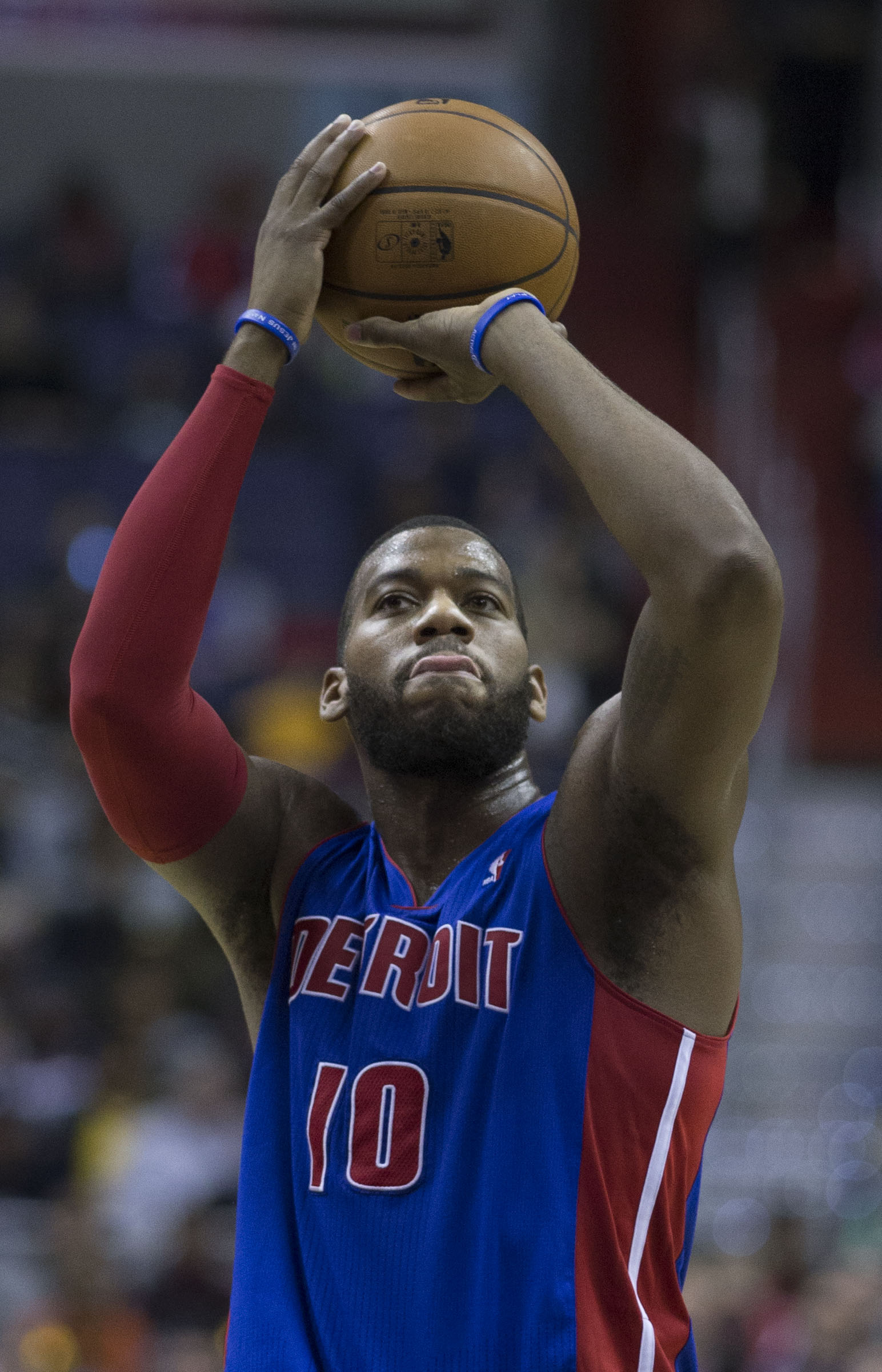
Greg Monroe with the Detroit Pistons in a game against the Washington Wizards at the Verizon Center on January 18, 2014.

For the season, Austin Freeman led the Hoyas in scoring, shooting 52.5 percent from the field overall and 44.4 percent from three-point range and averaging 16.5 points per game, while Greg Monroe, who started all 34 games, also shot 52.5 percent and averaged 16.1 points per game. Chris Wright averaged 15.1 points per game and shot 47.0 percent, while Jason Clark averaged 10.5 points on 47.5 percent shooting. Freeman missed one game, came off the bench in another, and started 32 games, while the rest of them started in all 34 games during the season. Julian Vaughn also started in all 34 games, and Hollis Thompson appeared in all 34, starting in two of them.

Monroe opted to leave the team after the season, foregoing his junior and senior years of college to enter the 2010 National Basketball Association draft; the Detroit Pistons selected him. He left Georgetown having started all 65 games of his collegiate career, shooting 54.3 percent from the field and averaging 14.5 points and 8.2 rebounds per game. After a first year in which he had scored only in the Lafayette game and taken only one shot and played only four minutes during the remainder of the season, reserve guard Stephan Stepka also left, transferring to James Madison. although he did not play there. They were the ninth and tenth Hoyas in five seasons to leave Georgetown prior to the expiration of their college eligibility.

The 2009–10 Hoyas played short-handed, with an understrength roster, shallow bench, and no seniors, and, like the 2008–09 team, their fortunes declined as the regular season wore on. Unlike the Hoyas of 2008–09, however, they bounced back to make a deep run in the Big East tournament and returned to the NCAA tournament. But as they had two years earlier, the Hoyas lost to a double-digit seed in the tournament's first weekend. For the rest of John Thompson III's tenure as head coach, the Hoyas would never advance beyond the first weekend of the NCAA tournament.

The 2009–10 Hoyas finished with a record of 23–11 and were ranked No. 12 in the season's final AP Poll, which was taken before their loss to Ohio in the NCAA tournament. They were unranked in the postseason Coaches Poll.

== Roster ==
#	Name	Height	Weight (lbs.)	Position	Class	Hometown	Previous Team(s)
1	Hollis Thompson	6'7"	205	F	Fr.	Los Angeles, California	Loyola HS
4	Chris Wright	6'1"	208	G	Jr.	Bowie, Maryland	St. John's College HS
10	Greg Monroe	6'11"	247	C	So.	New Orleans, Louisiana	Helen Cox HS
11	Vee Sanford	6'3"	180	G	Fr.	Lexington, Kentucky	Lexington HS
12	Ryan Dougherty	6'0"	192	G	Jr.	Kensington, Maryland	St. Alban's HS; Rochester
15	Austin Freeman	6'3"	227	G	Jr.	Mitchellville, Maryland	DeMatha HS
20	Jerrelle Benimon	6'7"	242	F	Fr.	Warrenton, Virginia	Fauquier HS
21	Jason Clark	6'2"	170	G	So.	Arlington, Virginia	Bishop O'Connell HS
22	Julian Vaughn	6'9"	247	F	Jr.	Vienna, Virginia	Oak Hill Academy; Florida State
25	Stephen Stepka	6'6"	190	G	Fr.	Fairfax, Virginia	W.T. Woodson HS
30	Henry Sims	6'10"	230	C	Jr.	Baltimore, Maryland	Mount St. Joseph HS

== Rankings ==
Ranking movements Legend: ██ Increase in ranking ██ Decrease in ranking RV = Received votes
	Week																			
Poll	Pre	2	3	4	5	6	7	8	9	10	11	12	13	14	15	16	17	18	Post	Final
AP	20	19	18	16	15	11	14	13	12	11	12	7	7	7	10	11	19	22	14	(Note: No Associated Press Poll this week.)
Coaches	21	20	19	14	13	11	13	13	12	11	14	11	8	8	10	13	20	22	15	RV

== 2009–10 schedule and results ==
- All times are Eastern

Date time, TV	Rank^{#}	Opponent^{#}	Result	Record	Site (attendance) city, state
Regular season
November 13, 2009*; 7:00 pm	No. 20	at Tulane	W 74–58	1–0	Avron B. Fogelman Arena (3,463); New Orleans
November 17, 2009*; 4:00 pm, ESPN	No. 19	Temple	W 46–45	2–0	Verizon Center (8,712); Washington, D.C.
November 21, 2009*; 1:00 pm	No. 19	at Savannah State	W 63–44	3–0	Tiger Arena (3,176); Savannah, Georgia
November 28, 2009*; 12:00 pm, MASN	No. 18	Lafayette	W 97–64	4–0	Verizon Center (9,712); Washington, D.C.
November 30, 2009*; 7:30 pm, MASN	No. 16	Mount St. Mary's	W 83–62	5–0	Verizon Center (7,643); Washington, D.C.
December 5, 2009*; 4:00 pm	No. 16	American	W 73–46	6–0	Verizon Center (10,465); Washington, D.C.
December 8, 2009*; 7:00 pm, ESPN	No. 15	vs. No. 22 Butler; Jimmy V Classic	W 72–65	7–0	Madison Square Garden (NA); New York City
December 12, 2009*; 2:00 pm, FSN	No. 15	vs. No. 17 Washington; John R. Wooden Classic	W 74–66	8–0	Honda Center (NA); Anaheim, California
December 19, 2009*; 7:00 pm, MASN	No. 11	Old Dominion	L 66–74	8–1	McDonough Arena (2,400); Washington, D.C.
December 23, 2009*; 12:00 pm, MASN	No. 14	Harvard	W 86–70	9–1	Verizon Center (7,613); Washington, D.C.
December 31, 2009; 8:00 pm, ESPN2	No. 13	St. John's	W 64–59	10–1 (1–0)	Verizon Center (9,376); Washington, D.C.
January 3, 2010; 2:00 pm, MASN	No. 13	at DePaul	W 67–50	11–1 (2–0)	Allstate Arena (8,595); Rosemont, Illinois
January 6, 2010; 8:00 pm, MASN	No. 12	at Marquette	L 59–62	11–2 (2–1)	Bradley Center (15,984); Milwaukee
January 9, 2010; 12:00 pm, ESPN	No. 12	No. 13 Connecticut; Rivalry	W 72–69	12–2 (3–1)	Verizon Center (15,654); Washington, D.C.
January 14, 2010; 7:00 pm, ESPN	No. 11	Seton Hall	W 85–73	13–2 (4–1)	Verizon Center (12,824); Washington, D.C.
January 17, 2010; 12:00 pm, MASN	No. 11	at No. 4 Villanova	L 77–82	13–3 (4–2)	Wachovia Center (20,016); Philadelphia
January 20, 2010; 7:00 pm, ESPNU	No. 12	at No. 9 Pittsburgh	W 74–66	14–3 (5–2)	Petersen Events Center (12,677); Pittsburgh
January 23, 2010; 12:00 pm, MASN	No. 12	Rutgers	W 88–63	15–3 (6–2)	Verizon Center (13,124); Washington, D.C.
January 25, 2010; 7:00 pm, ESPN	No. 7	at No. 4 Syracuse; Rivalry	L 56–73	15–4 (6–3)	Carrier Dome (26,508); Syracuse, New York
January 30, 2010*; 1:00 pm, CBS	No. 7	No. 8 Duke	W 89–77	16–4	Verizon Center (20,039); Washington, D.C.
February 3, 2010; 7:00 pm, MASN	No. 7	South Florida	L 64–72	16–5 (6–4)	Verizon Center (12,207); Washington, D.C.
February 6, 2010; 12:00 pm, ESPN	No. 7	No. 2 Villanova	W 103–90	17–5 (7–4)	Verizon Center (10,387); Washington, D.C.
February 9, 2010; 7:00 pm, ESPN2	No. 7	at Providence	W 79–70	18–5 (8–4)	Dunkin' Donuts Center (9,073); Providence, Rhode Island
February 14, 2010; 4:00 pm, MASN	No. 7	at Rutgers	L 68–71	18–6 (8–5)	The RAC (6,225); Piscataway, New Jersey
February 18, 2010; 7:00 pm, ESPN	No. 10	No. 5 Syracuse; Rivalry	L 71–75	18–7 (8–6)	Verizon Center (19,976); Washington, D.C.
February 23, 2010; 7:00 pm, ESPN2	No. 11	at Louisville	W 70–60	19–7 (9–6)	Freedom Hall (19,917); Louisville, Kentucky
February 27, 2010; 12:00 pm, CBS	No. 11	Notre Dame	L 64–78	19–8 (9–7)	Verizon Center (15,992); Washington, D.C.
March 1, 2010; 7:00 pm, ESPN	No. 19	at No. 10 West Virginia	L 68–81	19–9 (9–8)	WVU Coliseum (13,211); Morgantown, West Virginia
March 6, 2010; 12:00 pm, ESPN	No. 19	Cincinnati	W 74–47	20–9 (10–8)	Verizon Center (17,054); Washington, D.C.
Big East tournament
March 10, 2010; 12:00 pm, ESPN2	(8) No. 22	vs. (9) South Florida; Second round	W 69–49	21–9	Madison Square Garden (19,375); New York
March 11, 2010; 12:00 pm, ESPN	(8) No. 22	vs. (1) No. 3 Syracuse; Quarterfinal/Rivalry	W 91–84	22–9	Madison Square Garden (19,375); New York
March 12, 2010; 7:00 pm, ESPN	(8) No. 22	vs. (5) Marquette; Semifinal	W 80–57	23–9	Madison Square Garden (19,375); New York
March 13, 2010; 9:00 pm, ESPN	(8) No. 22	vs. (3) No. 7 West Virginia; Final	L 58–60	23–10	Madison Square Garden (19,375); New York
NCAA tournament
March 18, 2010; 7:25 pm, CBS	(3 MW) No. 12	vs. (14 MW) Ohio; First round	L 83–97	23–11	Dunkin' Donuts Center (10,788); Providence, Rhode Island
*Non-conference game. ^{#}Rankings from AP Poll. (#) Tournament seedings in parentheses.

== Awards and honors ==
=== Big East Conference honors ===
Postseason honors
Honors	Player	Position	Date awarded	Ref.
All-Big East First Team	Greg Monroe	C	March 8, 2010	
All-Big East Second Team	Austin Freeman	G	March 8, 2010	
