= 2009–10 Pittsburgh Panthers men's basketball team =

American college basketball season

2009–10 Pittsburgh Panthers men's basketball

NCAA tournament, Round of 32
- Conference: Big East Conference

Ranking
- Coaches: No. 20
- AP: No. 18
- Record: 25–9 (13–5 Big East)
- Head coach: Jamie Dixon (7th season)
- Assistant coaches: Tom Herrion (3rd season); Pat Sandle (9th season); Brandin Knight (2nd season)
- Home arena: Petersen Events Center (Capacity: 12,508)

2009–10 Big East men's basketball standings
	Conf.				Overall
Team	W		L	PCT	W		L	PCT
No. 4 Syracuse	15	–	3	.833	30	–	5	.857
No. 6 West Virginia †	13	–	5	.722	31	–	7	.816
No. 9 Villanova	13	–	5	.722	25	–	8	.758
No. 18 Pittsburgh	13	–	5	.722	25	–	9	.735
Marquette	11	–	7	.611	22	–	12	.647
Louisville	11	–	7	.611	20	–	13	.606
No. 14 Georgetown	10	–	8	.556	23	–	11	.676
Notre Dame	10	–	8	.556	23	–	12	.657
South Florida	9	–	9	.500	20	–	13	.606
Seton Hall	9	–	9	.500	19	–	13	.594
Cincinnati	7	–	11	.389	19	–	16	.543
Connecticut	7	–	11	.389	18	–	16	.529
St. John's	6	–	12	.333	17	–	16	.515
Rutgers	5	–	13	.278	15	–	17	.469
Providence	4	–	14	.222	12	–	19	.387
DePaul	1	–	17	.056	8	–	23	.258
† 2010 Big East tournament winner As of April 3, 2010; Rankings from AP Poll

The 2009–10 Pittsburgh Panthers men's basketball team represented the University of Pittsburgh in the 2009–10 NCAA Division I men's basketball season. Their head coach was Jamie Dixon, who was in his 7th year as head coach at Pittsburgh and 11th overall at the university. The team played its home games in the Petersen Events Center in Pittsburgh, Pennsylvania and were members of the Big East Conference. They finished the season 25–9, 13–5 in Big East play and lost in the quarterfinals of the 2010 Big East men's basketball tournament. They received an at–large bid to the 2010 NCAA Division I men's basketball tournament, earning a 3 seed in the West Region. They defeated 14 seed Oakland in the first round before losing to 6 seed and AP No. 25 Xavier in the second round.

== Outlook ==
The Pittsburgh Panthers advanced to last season's NCAA Elite Eight. The team lost four starters, including NBA draft selections Sam Young and DeJuan Blair, along with point guard Levance Fields and forward/center Tyrell Biggs. Guard Jermaine Dixon was the only returning starter from last season's squad while projected starter Gilbert Brown was suspended for the fall semester for academic reasons, although he reenrolled and returned to the team in December. Four freshman joined the Panthers, including McDonald's High School All-American Dante Taylor. Also new to the team was senior guard Chase Adams, a transfer from Centenary College of Louisiana. The Panthers' roster was the most inexperienced in the Big East, with six freshmen, two sophomores and only two seniors, and when Dixon went down with a foot injury in the offseason, ruling him out until well into December, the remaining roster had a total of one career start.

The Panthers were selected to finish 9th in the Big East by the Big East coaches during their conference media day.

== Coaching staff ==
Name	Position	Year at Pittsburgh	Alma Mater (Year)
Jamie Dixon	Head coach	11th (7th as head coach)	TCU (1987)
Tom Herrion	Associate head coach	3rd	Merrimack (1989)
Pat Sandle	Assistant coach	9th	San Francisco State (1987)
Brandin Knight	Assistant coach	4th	University of Pittsburgh (2005)
Brian Regan	Director of Operations	3rd	Saint Vincent (1988)
Rasheen Davis	Video Coordinator	2nd	St. Thomas Aquinas (2005)

== Recruiting ==
College recruiting
Name	Hometown	School	Height	Weight	Commit date
Lamar Patterson small forward	Lancaster, Pennsylvania	St. Benedict's Prep/J.P. McCaskey H.S.	6 ft 5 in (1.96 m)	220 lb (100 kg)	Dec 28, 2007
Lamar Patterson small forward	Recruit ratings: Scout: Rivals: (91)				
J. J. Richardson center/power forward	Missouri City, Texas	Fort Bend Hightower HS	6 ft 7 in (2.01 m)	232.5 lb (105.5 kg)	Sep 16, 2008
J. J. Richardson center/power forward	Recruit ratings: Scout: Rivals: (89)				
Dante Taylor power forward	Greenburgh, New York	National Christian Academy, MD	6 ft 8 in (2.03 m)	222.5 lb (100.9 kg)	Jul 14, 2008
Dante Taylor power forward	Recruit ratings: Scout: Rivals: (97)				
Talib Zanna center/power forward	Kaduna, Nigeria	Bishop McNamara HS, MD	6 ft 8.5 in (2.04 m)	222.5 lb (100.9 kg)	Sep 29, 2008
Talib Zanna center/power forward	Recruit ratings: Scout: Rivals: (90)				
Overall recruit ranking: Scout: 15 Rivals: 25
Note: In many cases, Scout, Rivals, 247Sports, On3, and ESPN may conflict in their listings of height and weight.; In these cases, the average was taken. ESPN grades are on a 100-point scale.; Sources: "Pittsburgh Commit List for 2009". Rivals.; "Men's Basketball Recruiting". Scout.; "Pittsburgh Basketball Recruiting 2009". ESPN.; "Scout.com Team Recruiting Rankings". Scout.; "2009 Team Ranking". Rivals.

== Roster ==
Name	#	Position	Height	Weight (lb.)	Year	Hometown	Previous School
Chase Adams	3	Guard	5 ft 10 in (1.78 m)	190	Senior	Baltimore, MD	Centenary/Mount Saint Joseph HS
Gilbert Brown*	5	Guard/Forward	6 ft 6 in (1.98 m)	200	Junior (RS)	Harrisburg, PA	South Kent School
Jermaine Dixon	24	Guard	6 ft 3 in (1.91 m)	200	Senior, Transfer	Baltimore, MD	Tallahassee CC/Maine Central Inst/Blake HS
Tim Frye	44	Guard	6 ft 4 in (1.93 m)	205	Junior	Mars, PA	Mars Area HS
Ashton Gibbs	12	Guard	6 ft 2 in (1.88 m)	190	Sophomore	Scotch Plains, NJ	Seton Hall Prep
Gary McGhee	52	Center	6 ft 10 in (2.08 m)	250	Junior	Anderson, IN	Highland HS
Dwight Miller	25	Forward	6 ft 8 in (2.03 m)	240	Freshman (RS)	Nassau, Bahamas	St. Pius X HS
Lamar Patterson	21	Guard/Forward	6 ft 5 in (1.96 m)	220	Freshman	Lancaster, PA	St. Benedict's Prep/J.P. McCaskey H.S.
J. J. Richardson	55	Forward	6 ft 7 in (2.01 m)	235	Freshman	Missouri City, TX	Fort Bend Hightower HS
Nick Rivers	14	Guard	6 ft 0 in (1.83 m)	180	Junior	Phoenix, AZ	Brophy College Prep
Nasir Robinson	35	Forward	6 ft 5 in (1.96 m)	220	Sophomore	Chester, PA	Chester HS
Dante Taylor	11	Forward	6 ft 9 in (2.06 m)	240	Freshman	Greenburgh, NY	National Christian Academy (MD)
Brad Wanamaker	22	Guard	6 ft 4 in (1.93 m)	210	Junior	Philadelphia, PA	Roman Catholic HS
Travon Woodall	1	Guard	5 ft 11 in (1.80 m)	190	Freshman (RS)	Brooklyn, NY	St. Anthony HS
Talib Zanna	42	Forward	6 ft 9 in (2.06 m)	225	Freshman	Kaduna, Nigeria	Bishop McNamara HS (MD)

*Suspended for the fall semester for academic reasons, but re-enrolled and returned to the team in December.

== Schedule ==
Date time, TV	Rank^{#}	Opponent^{#}	Result	Record	Site (attendance) city, state
Exhibition
Sun. Nov. 1*; 4:00 pm		Slippery Rock	W 75–64	—	Petersen Events Center (5,815); Pittsburgh, PA
Sun. Nov. 8*; 4:00 pm		Coker	W 83–40	—	Petersen Events Center (6,103); Pittsburgh, PA
Regular season
Fri. Nov. 13*; 8:10 pm		Wofford	W 63–60	1–0	Petersen Events Center (10,112); Pittsburgh, PA
Tue. Nov. 17*; 5:30 pm, ESPN2		Binghamton; CBE Classic	W 71–46	2–0	Petersen Events Center (7,677); Pittsburgh, PA
Thu. Nov. 19*; 7:00 pm		Eastern Kentucky; CBE Classic	W 71–60	3–0	Petersen Events Center (9,148); Pittsburgh, PA
Mon. Nov. 23*; 7:37 pm, ESPN2		vs. Wichita State; CBE Classic Semifinal	W 68–55	4–0	Sprint Center; Kansas City, MO
Tue. Nov. 24*; 10:25 pm, ESPN2		vs. No. 3 Texas; CBE Classic Championship	L 62–78	4–1	Sprint Center (8,076); Kansas City, MO
Sat. Nov. 28*; 12:00 pm, ESPN Regional/FSN Pittsburgh		Youngstown State	W 72–56	5–1	Petersen Events Center (10,135); Pittsburgh, PA
Wed. Dec. 2*; 7:00 pm, CBS College Sports		vs. Duquesne; The City Game	W 67–58	6–1	Mellon Arena (12,336); Pittsburgh, PA
Fri. Dec. 4*; 7:00 pm		New Hampshire	W 47–32	7–1	Petersen Events Center (8,856); Pittsburgh, PA
Tue. Dec. 8*; 9:00 pm, ESPN		vs. Indiana; Jimmy V Classic	L 64–74	7–2	Madison Square Garden (8,975); New York, NY
Sat. Dec. 12*; 2:00 pm, ESPNU		Kent State	W 71–59	8–2	Petersen Events Center (9,468); Pittsburgh, PA
Sat. Dec. 19*; 4:00 pm		Mount St. Mary's	W 66–48	9–2	Petersen Events Center (7,039); Pittsburgh, PA
Tue. Dec. 22*; 7:00 pm, ESPN Regional/FSN Pittsburgh		Ohio	W 74–49	10–2	Petersen Events Center (9,261); Pittsburgh, PA
Mon. Dec. 28; 7:00 pm, ESPNU		DePaul	W 65–52	11–2 (1–0)	Petersen Events Center (10,811); Pittsburgh, PA
Sat. Jan. 2; 12:00 pm, ESPN Regional/WTAE-TV		at No. 5 Syracuse	W 82–72	12–2 (2–0)	Carrier Dome (24,969); Syracuse, NY
Mon. Jan. 4; 7:00 pm, ESPN Big Monday	No. 23	at Cincinnati	W 74–71	13–2 (3–0)	Fifth Third Arena (8,699); Cincinnati, OH
Wed. Jan. 13; 7:00 pm, ESPN2	No. 16	at No. 15 Connecticut	W 67–57	14–2 (4–0)	XL Center (15,290); Hartford, CT
Sat. Jan. 16; 12:00 pm, ESPN Regional/WTAE-TV	No. 16	Louisville	W 82–77 ^{OT}	15–2 (5–0)	Petersen Events Center (12,781); Pittsburgh, PA
Wed. Jan. 20; 7:00 pm, ESPNU	No. 9	No. 12 Georgetown	L 66–74	15–3 (5–1)	Petersen Events Center (12,677); Pittsburgh, PA
Sun. Jan. 24; 2:00 pm, ESPN Regional/FSN Pittsburgh	No. 9	at Seton Hall	L 61–64	15–4 (5–2)	Prudential Center (8,043); Newark, NJ
Thu. Jan. 28; 7:00 pm, ESPNU	No. 17	St. John's	W 63–53	16–4 (6–2)	Petersen Events Center (12,511); Pittsburgh, PA
Sun. Jan. 31; 1:00 pm, ESPNU	No. 17	at South Florida	L 61–70	16–5 (6–3)	USF Sun Dome (5,370); Tampa, FL
Wed. Feb. 3; 7:00 pm, ESPN Regional/FSN Pittsburgh	No. 22	at No. 6 West Virginia; Backyard Brawl	L 51–70	16–6 (6–4)	WVU Coliseum (15,419); Morgantown, WV
Sat. Feb. 6; 6:00 pm	No. 22	Seton Hall	W 83–58	17–6 (7–4)	Petersen Events Center (6,681); Pittsburgh, PA
Mon. Feb. 8*; 8:00 pm, ESPN Regional/FSN Pittsburgh	No. 25	Robert Morris	W 77–53	18–6	Petersen Events Center (7,211); Pittsburgh, PA
Fri. Feb. 12; 9:00 pm, ESPN	No. 25	No. 5 West Virginia; Backyard Brawl	W 98–95 ^{3OT}	19–6 (8–4)	Petersen Events Center (12,902); Pittsburgh, PA
Thu. Feb. 18; 9:00 pm, ESPN2	No. 19	at Marquette	W 58–51	20–6 (9–4)	Bradley Center (16,486); Milwaukee, WI
Sun. Feb. 21; 12:00 pm, CBS	No. 19	No. 3 Villanova	W 70–65	21–6 (10–4)	Petersen Events Center (12,920); Pittsburgh, PA
Wed. Feb. 24; 7:00 pm, ESPN2	No. 12	at Notre Dame	L 53–68	21–7 (10–5)	Edmund P. Joyce Center (8,581); Notre Dame, IN
Sat. Feb. 27; 12:00 pm, ESPN Regional/FSN Pittsburgh	No. 12	at St. John's	W 71–64	22–7 (11–5)	Madison Square Garden (6,892); New York, NY
Thu. Mar. 4; 9:00 pm, ESPN2	No. 17	Providence	W 73–71	23–7 (12–5)	Petersen Events Center (12,511); Pittsburgh, PA
Sat. Mar. 6; 4:30 pm, ESPN Regional/FSN Pittsburgh	No. 17	Rutgers	W 83–54	24–7 (13–5)	Petersen Events Center (12,508); Pittsburgh, PA
Big East tournament
Thu. Mar. 11; 7:00 pm, ESPN	(2) No. 16	vs. (7) Notre Dame; Big East Quarterfinals	L 45–50	24–8	Madison Square Garden (19,375); New York, NY
NCAA tournament
Fri. Mar. 19; 3:05 pm, CBS	(3 W) No. 18	vs. (14 W) Oakland; NCAA First Round	W 89–66	25–8	Bradley Center (17,847); Milwaukee, WI
Sun. Mar. 21; 4:50 pm, CBS	(3 W) No. 18	vs. (6 W) No. 25 Xavier; NCAA Second Round	L 68–71	25–9	Bradley Center (18,031); Milwaukee, WI
*Non-conference game. ^{#}Rankings from AP Poll. (#) Tournament seedings in parentheses. W=NCAA West Regional. All times are in Eastern Time.

== Rankings ==
Ranking movement Legend: ██ Improvement in ranking. ██ Decrease in ranking. ██ Not ranked the previous week. rv=Others receiving votes.
Poll	Pre	Wk 1	Wk 2	Wk 3	Wk 4	Wk 5	Wk 6	Wk 7	Wk 8	Wk 9	Wk 10	Wk 11	Wk 12	Wk 13	Wk 14	Wk 15	Wk 16	WK 17	Wk 18	Final
AP	rv	rv	rv	rv	rv	rv	rv	--	23	16	9	17	22	25	19	12	17	16	18	n/a
Coaches	rv	rv	rv	rv	--	--	--	--	rv	20	11	17	21	23	21	16	18	16	16	20

== Accomplishments ==
- Pitt achieved a school record ninth straight 20-win season and a school record ninth straight season with 10 wins in the Big East Conference.
- Sophomore guard Ashton Gibbs was named Second-Team All-Big East.
- Ashton Gibbs was named the Big East's most improved player.
- Ninth straight NCAA Tournament appearance.
