= 2009–10 St. Francis Terriers men's basketball team =

American college basketball season

2009–10 St. Francis Terriers men's basketball
- Conference: Northeast Conference
- Record: 11–18 (8–10 NEC)
- Head coach: Brian Nash (5th season)
- Assistant coaches: Clive Bentick (3rd season); Allen Griffin (4th season); Andy Johnston (2nd season)
- Home arena: Generoso Pope Athletic Complex

2009–10 Northeast Conference men's basketball standings
	Conf.				Overall
Team	W		L	PCT	W		L	PCT
Quinnipiac	15	–	3	.833	23	–	9	.719
Robert Morris †	15	–	3	.833	23	–	12	.657
Mount St. Mary's	12	–	6	.667	16	–	15	.516
Long Island	11	–	7	.611	14	–	17	.452
Fairleigh Dickinson	10	–	8	.556	11	–	21	.344
St. Francis (PA)	9	–	9	.500	11	–	19	.367
Central Connecticut	9	–	9	.500	12	–	18	.400
Monmouth	8	–	10	.444	12	–	19	.387
St. Francis (NY)	8	–	10	.444	11	–	18	.379
Sacred Heart	7	–	11	.389	14	–	15	.483
Wagner	3	–	15	.167	5	–	26	.161
Bryant*	1	–	17	.056	1	–	29	.033
† 2010 Northeast Conference tournament winner As of March 17, 2010; Rankings from AP Poll; *Ineligible for conference tournament

The 2009–10 St. Francis Terriers men's basketball team represented St. Francis College during the 2009–10 NCAA Division I men's basketball season. The team was coached by Brian Nash, who was in his fifth year at the helm of the St. Francis Terriers. The Terriers' home games were played at the Generoso Pope Athletic Complex. The team has been a member of the Northeast Conference since 1981.

Nash's team finished at 11–18 overall and 8–10 in conference play for an 8th-place finish. After the season Nash resigned, he produced a 47–99 record through five seasons as the Terriers' head coach.

== Roster ==
2009–10 St. Francis Brooklyn Terriers men's basketball team
Players
Coaches

Pos.	#	Name	Height	Weight	Year	Hometown
G/F	32	Kayode Ayeni	6 ft 5 in (1.96 m)	180 lb (82 kg)	Sr	Brooklyn, NY
F	23	Herman Wrice	6 ft 7 in (2.01 m)	210 lb (95 kg)	Sr	Philadelphia, PA
F	21	Nigel Byam	6 ft 7 in (2.01 m)	210 lb (95 kg)	Sr	Brooklyn, NY
F/C	40	Alexander Harrington	6 ft 9 in (2.06 m)	220 lb (100 kg)	Jr	Lanham, Maryland
G	11	Ricky Cadell	6 ft 2 in (1.88 m)	180 lb (82 kg)	Jr	Bronx, NY
G	5	Brandon Fisher	5 ft 11 in (1.8 m)	185 lb (84 kg)	Jr	Chicago, Illinois
G/F	24	Akeem Bennett	6 ft 3 in (1.91 m)	180 lb (82 kg)	Jr	Long Island, NY
G	5	Ricky Williams	5 ft 11 in (1.8 m)	180 lb (82 kg)	So	Brooklyn, New York
G/F	2	Stefan Perunicic	6 ft 6 in (1.98 m)	195 lb (88 kg)	So	Belgrade, Serbia
G	15	Justin Newton	6 ft 0 in (1.83 m)	190 lb (86 kg)	So	Brooklyn, NY
C	20	Richard Clark	6 ft 9 in (2.06 m)	215 lb (98 kg)	So	Berkshire, England
F	30	Akeem Johnson	6 ft 6 in (1.98 m)	200 lb (91 kg)	Fr	Brooklyn, New York

Head coach

- Brian Nash (Keene State '92)

Assistant coach(es)

- Clive Bentick (Canisius '01)
- Andy Johnston (New Hampshire)
- Allen Griffin (Syracuse '01)

Legend

- (C) Team captain
- (S) Suspended
- (I) Ineligible
- (W) Walk-on
- Injured
- Current redshirt

Roster
Last update: April 1, 2010

== Schedule and results ==
Date time, TV	Opponent	Result	Record	Site (attendance) city, state
Regular Season
November 13, 2009*; 7:00 pm	Brown	L 64–68	0–1	Generoso Pope Athletic Complex (743); Brooklyn, NY
November 17, 2009*; 7:00 pm	at Boston College	L 44–72	0–2	Silvio O. Conte Forum (2,882); Chestnut Hill, MA
November 21, 2009*; 2:00 pm	Canisius	L 69–79	0–3	Generoso Pope Athletic Complex (365); Brooklyn, NY
November 24, 2009*; 7:00 pm	at UMass	L 65–83	0–4	William D. Mullins Center (2,411); Amherst, MA
November 28, 2009; 4:00 pm	at Colgate	W 66–65	1–4	Cotterell Court (265); Hamilton, NY
December 3, 2009; 7:00 pm	Central Connecticut State	L 50–63	1–5 (0–1)	Generoso Pope Athletic Complex (393); Brooklyn, NY
December 5, 2009; 12:00 pm	Bryant	W 54–48	2–5 (1–1)	Generoso Pope Athletic Complex (502); Brooklyn, NY
December 8, 2009*; 7:00 pm	Hartford	W 63–60	3–5	Generoso Pope Athletic Complex (293); Brooklyn, NY
December 13, 2009*; 1:00 pm	at Syracuse	L 51–75	3–6	Carrier Dome (19,381); Syracuse, NY
December 22, 2009*; 7:35 pm	Lafayette	L 69–74	3–7	Generoso Pope Athletic Complex (578); Brooklyn, NY
December 29, 2009*; 7:00 pm	at Fairfield	L 58–65	3–8	Webster Bank Arena (1,960); Bridgeport, CT
January 7, 2010; 7:30 pm	Saint Francis (PA)	W 69–57	4–8 (2–1)	Generoso Pope Athletic Complex (378); Brooklyn, NY
January 9, 2010; 4:30 pm	Robert Morris	L 63–67	4–9 (2–2)	Generoso Pope Athletic Complex (307); Brooklyn, NY
January 11, 2010*; 7:00 pm	at Columbia	W 59–53	5–9	Levien Gymnasium (410); Manhattan, NY
January 14, 2010; 7:30 pm	at Mount St. Mary's	W 61–58	6–9 (3–2)	Knott Arena (1,018); Emmitsburg, MD
January 16, 2010; 7:00 pm	at Wagner	W 60–53	7–9 (4–2)	Spiro Sports Center (1,056); Staten Island, NY
January 18, 2010; 7:00 pm	at Dartmouth	L 64–65	7–10	Leede Arena (358); Hanover, NH
January 21, 2010; 7:30 pm	Mount St. Mary's	W 63–60	8–10 (5–2)	Generoso Pope Athletic Complex (437); Brooklyn, NY
January 23, 2010; 4:30 pm	Wagner	W 57–54	9–10 (6–2)	Generoso Pope Athletic Complex (605); Brooklyn, NY
January 28, 2010; 7:30 pm	at Saint Francis (PA)	L 63–71	9–11 (6–3)	DeGol Arena (1,123); Loretto, PA
January 30, 2010; 7:00 pm	at Robert Morris	L 56–74	9–12 (6–4)	Charles L. Sewall Center (1,124); Moon Township, PA
February 4, 2010; 7:30 pm	Long Island	L 53–62	9–13 (6–5)	Generoso Pope Athletic Complex (773); Brooklyn, NY
February 6, 2010; 7:00 pm	at Long Island; Battle of Brooklyn	W 88–84 ^{3OT}	10–13 (7–5)	Athletic, Recreation & Wellness Center (879); Brooklyn, NY
February 11, 2010; 7:30 pm	at Quinnipiac	L 65–77	10–14 (7–6)	TD Bank Sports Center (1,298); Hamden, CT
February 13, 2010; 3:30 pm	at Sacred Heart	L 50–62	10–15 (7–7)	William H. Pitt Center (1,294); Fairfield, CT
February 18, 2010; 7:30 pm	Monmouth	L 49–51	10–16 (7–8)	Generoso Pope Athletic Complex (683); Brooklyn, NY
February 20, 2010; 4:30 pm	Fairleigh Dickinson	L 55–56	10–17 (7–9)	Generoso Pope Athletic Complex (705); Brooklyn, NY
February 25, 2010; 7:30 pm	at Bryant	W 69–60 ^{OT}	11–17 (8–9)	Chace Athletic Center (424); Smithfield, RI
February 27, 2010; 4:30 pm	at Central Connecticut State	L 56–68	11–18 (8–10)	William H. Detrick Gymnasium (1,774); New Britain, CT
*Non-conference game. ^{#}Rankings from AP Poll. (#) Tournament seedings in parentheses.
