= 2010 Northeast Conference men's basketball tournament =

- Tournament Logo
- Classification: Division I
- Season: 2009–10
- Teams: 8
- Site: campus sites
- Finals site: TD Bank Sports Center; Hamden, Connecticut
- Champions: Robert Morris (7th title)
- Winning coach: Mike Rice Jr. (2nd title)
- MVP: Karon Abraham (Robert Morris)

2009–10 Northeast Conference men's basketball standings
	Conf.				Overall
Team	W		L	PCT	W		L	PCT
Quinnipiac	15	–	3	.833	23	–	9	.719
Robert Morris †	15	–	3	.833	23	–	12	.657
Mount St. Mary's	12	–	6	.667	16	–	15	.516
Long Island	11	–	7	.611	14	–	17	.452
Fairleigh Dickinson	10	–	8	.556	11	–	21	.344
St. Francis (PA)	9	–	9	.500	11	–	19	.367
Central Connecticut	9	–	9	.500	12	–	18	.400
Monmouth	8	–	10	.444	12	–	19	.387
St. Francis (NY)	8	–	10	.444	11	–	18	.379
Sacred Heart	7	–	11	.389	14	–	15	.483
Wagner	3	–	15	.167	5	–	26	.161
Bryant*	1	–	17	.056	1	–	29	.033
† 2010 Northeast Conference tournament winner As of March 17, 2010; Rankings from AP Poll; *Ineligible for conference tournament

The 2010 Northeast Conference men's basketball tournament took place March 4, 7, and 10, 2010 on campus sites. One semifinal game was televised on MSG Network, and the finals were seen on ESPN2. The winner, Robert Morris, received the NEC's automatic berth in the 2010 NCAA tournament. The #1 seed Quinnipiac received an automatic bid to the 2010 NIT as the regular season champions. This is Robert Morris's NEC leading 7th NEC tournament championship.

== Format ==
For the sixth straight year, the NEC Men's Basketball Tournament consisted of an eight-team playoff format with all games played at the home of the higher seed. After the quarterfinals, the teams were reseeded so the highest remaining seed plays the lowest remaining seed in the semifinals. This was Bryant's first year at D-I and is ineligible for any post-season tournaments and thus not allowed to participate.

== Bracket ==
Quarterfinals; March 4
1	Quinnipiac	84
8	Monmouth	75
4	Long Island	63
5	Fairleigh Dickinson	61
(Pairings are reseeded after the first round)
3	Mount St. Mary's	65
6	Saint Francis (PA)	50
2	Robert Morris	71
7	Central Connecticut	63

Semifinals; March 7
1	Quinnipiac	83
4	Long Island	78
2	Robert Morris	80
3	Mount St. Mary's	62

Finals; March 10; ESPN2
1	Quinnipiac	50
2	Robert Morris	52

== All-tournament team ==
Tournament MVP in bold.

Name	School	Pos.	Year	Ht.	Hometown
**Karon Abraham**	Robert Morris	Guard	Freshman	5–9	Paterson, New Jersey
Jaytornah Wisseh	LIU Brooklyn	Guard	Senior	6–1	Brooklyn, New York
James Feldeine	Quinnipiac	Guard	Senior	6–4	New York City, New York
Dallas Green	Robert Morris	Forward	Senior	6–8	Indianapolis, Indiana
Justin Rutty	Quinnipiac	Forward	Junior	6–7	Newburgh, New York
