= 2009–10 Ohio Bobcats men's basketball team =

American college basketball season

2009–10 Ohio Bobcats men's basketball

MAC Tournament Champions

NCAA tournament, Round of 32
- Conference: Mid-American Conference
- East Division
- Record: 22–15 (7–9 MAC)
- Head coach: John Groce (2nd season)
- Assistant coaches: Chris Holtmann; Ramon Williams; Dustin Ford
- Home arena: Convocation Center

2009–10 Mid-American Conference men's basketball standings
	Conf.				Overall
Team	W		L	PCT	W		L	PCT
East
Kent State	13	–	3	.813	24	–	10	.706
Akron	12	–	4	.750	24	–	11	.686
Miami	9	–	7	.563	14	–	18	.438
Buffalo	9	–	7	.563	18	–	12	.600
Ohio†	7	–	9	.438	22	–	15	.595
Bowling Green	6	–	10	.375	14	–	16	.467
West
Central Michigan	9	–	7	.563	15	–	15	.500
Eastern Michigan	8	–	8	.500	17	–	15	.531
Western Michigan	8	–	8	.500	18	–	15	.545
Ball State	8	–	8	.500	15	–	15	.500
Northern Illinois	6	–	10	.375	10	–	20	.333
Toledo	1	–	15	.063	4	–	28	.125
† Conference tournament winner Rankings from AP Poll

The 2009–10 Ohio Bobcats men's basketball team represented Ohio University in the college basketball season of 2009–10. The team was coached by John Groce and played their homes game at the Convocation Center.

At the end of the regular season Ohio was seeded 9th in the 2010 MAC men's basketball tournament with a conference record of 7–9. However, the Bobcats reeled off four straight wins to win the MAC tournament, including an overtime win over Akron in the championship game. The victory earned them an automatic bid to the 2010 NCAA Division I men's basketball tournament. On Selection Sunday they were given the 14 seed in the Midwest region and slated to play the 3 seed Georgetown.

In a huge upset, the Bobcats dominated the Hoyas almost the whole game in the first round of the NCAA tournament, beating them 97–83. The win was Ohio's first NCAA Tournament win since 1983, when they toppled Illinois State in the first round. The Bobcats advanced to face the #6 seed Tennessee. They were knocked off by Tennessee 83–67 to finish the season 22–15.

== Before the season ==
=== Roster changes ===
The Ohio Bobcats lost six players from last year's team. Out of those six players, three were starters and two players recorded over 10 points per game. Jerome Tillman, who averaged 17.7 points and 8.1 rebounds per game for the Bobcats, now plays for the French team ÉS Chalon-sur-Saône The other two starters that departed from last year's team were Justin Orr and Michael Allen. Ohio has recruited six players to replace those players for the current season.

=== Recruiting ===
College recruiting
Name	Hometown	School	Height	Weight	Commit date
Ivo Baltic; PF	Kansas City, MO	Park Hill South HS	6 ft 8 in (2.03 m)	214 lb (97 kg)	Apr 6, 2009
Ivo Baltic; PF	Recruit ratings: Scout: (88)				
D. J. Cooper; PG	Chicago, IL	Seton Academy	5 ft 11 in (1.80 m)	165 lb (75 kg)	Sep 22, 2008
D. J. Cooper; PG	Recruit ratings: Scout: Rivals: (87)				
Marquis Horne; SF	Cincinnati, OH	Princeton HS	6 ft 6 in (1.98 m)	224 lb (102 kg)	Sep 7, 2008
Marquis Horne; SF	Recruit ratings: Scout: Rivals: (85)				
Reggie Keely; PF	University Heights, OH	Cleveland Heights HS	6 ft 8 in (2.03 m)	263 lb (119 kg)	Sep 22, 2008
Reggie Keely; PF	Recruit ratings: Scout: (85)				
James Kinney; PG	Champaign, IL	Centennial HS	6 ft 1 in (1.85 m)	178 lb (81 kg)	Oct 6, 2008
James Kinney; PG	Recruit ratings: Scout: (85)				
Overall recruit ranking:
Note: In many cases, Scout, Rivals, 247Sports, On3, and ESPN may conflict in their listings of height and weight.; In these cases, the average was taken. ESPN grades are on a 100-point scale.; Sources: "Ohio Commit List for 2009". Rivals.; "Scout.com: Men's Basketball Recruiting". Scout.; "Ohio Basketball Recruiting 2009". ESPN.; "Scout.com Team Recruiting Rankings". Scout.; "2009 Team Ranking". Rivals.

Following Ohio's exhibition win against Ashland on November 13, John Groce announced that Marquis Horne had left the team for, "personal reasons." Horne accrued 15 points and 10 rebounds in his two exhibition games as a Bobcat.

James (Jay) Kinney was dismissed from the team on February 12, 2010 due to repeated violation of team rules and policies.

== Roster ==
2009–10 Ohio Bobcats men's basketball team
Players
Coaches

Pos.	#	Name	Height	Weight	Year	Hometown
F	11	Adetunji Adedipe	6 ft 5 in (1.96 m)	225 lb (102 kg)	Jr	Orange, Ohio
F	3	Ivo Baltic	6 ft 8 in (2.03 m)	214 lb (97 kg)	Fr	Kansas City, Missouri
G	0	Armon Bassett	6 ft 2 in (1.88 m)	180 lb (82 kg)	Jr	Terre Haute, Indiana
G	2	Steven Coleman (injured) (S)	6 ft 5 in (1.96 m)	204 lb (93 kg)	So	Melbourne, Florida
G	5	D. J. Cooper	5 ft 11 in (1.8 m)	165 lb (75 kg)	Fr	Chicago, Illinois
F	24	Tommy Freeman	6 ft 5 in (1.96 m)	190 lb (86 kg)	Jr	Muncie, Indiana
F	30	Reggie Keely	6 ft 8 in (2.03 m)	263 lb (119 kg)	Fr	University Heights, Ohio
F	32	Alex Kellogg (I)	6 ft 7 in (2.01 m)	225 lb (102 kg)	Jr	Westerville, Ohio
G	4	David McKinley	5 ft 9 in (1.75 m)	156 lb (71 kg)	Fr	Dublin, Ohio
F	44	Asown Sayles	6 ft 6 in (1.98 m)	228 lb (103 kg)	RS Jr	McKeesport, Pennsylvania
C	12	Kenneth van Kempen	6 ft 10 in (2.08 m)	249 lb (113 kg)	Sr	Weert, The Netherlands
F	1	DeVaughn Washington	6 ft 8 in (2.03 m)	225 lb (102 kg)	Jr	Virginia Beach, Virginia

Head coach

John Groce

Assistant coach(es)

Chris Holtmann
Ramon Williams
Dustin Ford

Legend

- (C) Team captain
- (S) Suspended
- (I) Ineligible
- (W) Walk-on
- Injured
- Current redshirt

Roster
Last update: 2010-02-14

== Coaching staff ==
Name	Position	College	Graduating year
John Groce	Head coach	Taylor University	1994
Chris Holtmann	Assistant coach	Taylor University	1994
Dustin Ford	Assistant coach	Ohio University	2001
Ramon Williams	Assistant coach	Virginia Military Institute	1990
Aaron Fuss	Director of Operations	Ohio State University	2005

== Preseason ==
=== Preseason men's basketball poll ===
On October 28, the members of the MAC News Media Panel voted in the Preseason Media Poll. Ohio was picked last in the MAC East

East Division
Place	Team	1st	Points
1	Akron Zips	19	190 points
2	Kent State Golden Flashes	3	108 points
3	Buffalo Bulls	1	97 points
4	Miami RedHawks	–	78 points
5	Bowling Green Falcons	1	54 points
6	Ohio	–	32 points

West Division
Place	Team	1st	Points
1	Central Michigan Chippewas	10	113 points
2	Northern Illinois Huskies	4	102 points
3	Eastern Michigan Eagles	3	94 points
4	Ball State Cardinals	3	87 points
5	Western Michigan Broncos	4	79 points
6	Toledo Rockets	–	29 points

=== MAC tournament winner ===
Akron (19), Buffalo (2), Northern Illinois (1), Kent State (1), Bowling Green (1)

== Schedule ==
Date time, TV	Rank^{#}	Opponent^{#}	Result	Record	Site (attendance) city, state
Exhibition
October 30*; 7:00 p.m.		Taylor	W 76–40	—	Convocation Center (1,217); Athens, Ohio
November 7*; 2:00 p.m.		Ashland	W 63–53	—	Convocation Center (2,019); Athens, Ohio
Regular Season
November 13*; 7:00 p.m.		Ohio Valley	W 101–72; Stats	1–0	Convocation Center (3,189); Athens, Ohio
November 15*; 4:00 p.m.		Middle Tennessee; Global Sports Invitational	W 81–68; Stats	2–0	Convocation Center (3,355); Athens, Ohio
November 17*; 7:00 p.m.		North Carolina A&T; Global Sports Invitational	W 93–83; Stats	3–0	Convocation Center (3,822); Athens, Ohio
November 23*; 7:00 p.m.		Lamar; Global Sports Invitational	W 71–46; Stats	4–0	Convocation Center (3,827); Athens, Ohio
November 28*; 7:30 p.m., WSAZ-TV; WTAP-TV		vs. Marshall; Global Sports Invitational	L 53–60; Stats	4–1	Charleston Civic Center (2,515); Charleston, West Virginia
December 6*; 3:00 p.m.		at Tulsa	L 80–81; Stats	4–2	Reynolds Center (4,886); Tulsa, Oklahoma
December 9*; 7:00 p.m.		Austin Peay	L 66–68; Stats	4–3	Convocation Center (3,086); Athens, Ohio
December 12*; 2:00 p.m.		at Delaware	W 86–70; Stats	5–3	Bob Carpenter Center (2,269); Newark, Delaware
December 16*; 7:00 p.m.		Illinois State	W 75–57; Stats	6–3	Convocation Center (3,694); Athens, Ohio
December 19*; 2:30 p.m.		Eastern Kentucky	W 74–62; Stats	7–3	Convocation Center (3,714); Athens, Ohio
December 22*; 7:00 p.m., ESPN Regional; FSN Pittsburgh		at Pittsburgh	L 49–74; Stats	7–4	Petersen Events Center (9,261); Pittsburgh, Pennsylvania
December 29*; 7:00 p.m.		Elon	W 71–59; Stats	8–4	Convocation Center (4,822); Athens, Ohio
January 2*; 7:00 p.m.		at Robert Morris	L 79–81; Stats	8–5	Charles L. Sewall Center (763); Moon Township, Pennsylvania
January 6*; 7:00 p.m.		vs. IUPUI	W 63–62; Stats	9–5	Conseco Field House (1,450); Indianapolis, Indiana
MAC regular season
January 9; 2:00 p.m.		Kent State	L 60–62; Stats	9–6 (0–1)	Convocation Center (8,359); Athens, Ohio
January 13; 7:00 p.m.		Akron	L 62–67; Stats	9–7 (0–2)	Convocation Center (6,834); Athens, Ohio
January 16; 12:00 p.m., ESPNU		at Miami (OH)	L 67–79; Stats	9–8 (0–3)	Millett Hall (2,204); Oxford, Ohio
January 20; 7:00 p.m.		at Bowling Green	L 57–65; Stats	9–9 (0–4)	Anderson Arena (1,585); Bowling Green, Ohio
January 23; 2:00 p.m., FS Ohio		Buffalo	W 99–77; Stats	10–9 (1–4)	Convocation Center (10,689); Athens, Ohio
January 27; 8:00 p.m.		at Northern Illinois	W 99–84; Stats	11–9 (2–4)	Convocation Center (1,498); DeKalb, Illinois
January 31; 2:00 p.m.		Ball State	L 66–67; Stats ^{OT}	11–10 (2–5)	Convocation Center (5,596); Athens, Ohio
February 4; 7:00 p.m.		at Toledo	W 65–58; Stats ^{OT}	12–10 (3–5)	Savage Arena (3,408); Toledo, Ohio
February 6; 4:30 p.m.		at Eastern Michigan	L 61–70; Stats\	12–11 (3–6)	Convocation Center (1,362); Ypsilanti, Michigan
February 9; 7:00 p.m.		Western Michigan	W 90–74; Stats	13–11 (4–6)	Convocation Center (2,880); Athens, Ohio
February 11; 7:00 p.m.		Central Michigan	W 89–76; Stats	14–11 (5–6)	Convocation Center (4,051); Athens, Ohio
February 14; 2:00 p.m.		at Akron	L 88–91; Stats ^{2OT}	14–12 (5–7)	James A. Rhodes Arena (3,469); Akron, Ohio
February 17; 7:00 p.m.		at Kent State	L 67–74; Stats	14–13 (5–8)	Memorial Athletic and Convocation Center (3,763); Kent, Ohio
February 20*; 4:00 p.m.		Wright State; ESPN BracketBusters	W 64–59; Stats	15–13	Convocation Center (8,164); Athens, Ohio
February 24; 7:00 p.m.		Miami (OH)	W 70–68; Stats	16–13 (6–8)	Convocation Center (7,044); Athens, Ohio
February 27; 7:00 p.m.		at Buffalo	L 69–72; Stats	16–14 (6–9)	Alumni Arena (2,321); Buffalo, New York
March 4; 7:00 p.m.		Bowling Green	W 82–60; Stats	17–14 (7–9)	Convocation Center (6,792); Athens, Ohio
MAC tournament
March 7; 2:00 p.m.	(9)	at (8) Ball State; MAC First Round	W 85–77; Stats ^{OT}	18–14	John E. Worthen Arena (2,667); Muncie, Indiana
March 11; 7:00 p.m., FS Ohio	(9)	vs. (1) Kent State; MAC Quarterfinals	W 81–64; Stats	19–14	Quicken Loans Arena (4,125); Cleveland, Ohio
March 12; 9:30 p.m., FS Ohio	(9)	vs. (4) Miami (Ohio); MAC Semifinals	W 54–42; Stats	20–14	Quicken Loans Arena (5,089); Cleveland, Ohio
March 13; 6:00 p.m., ESPN2	(9)	vs. (3) Akron; MAC Championship Game	W 81–75; Stats ^{OT}	21–14	Quicken Loans Arena (9,533); Cleveland, Ohio
NCAA tournament
March 18*; 7:25 p.m., CBS	(14 MW)	vs. (3 MW) No. 12 Georgetown; NCAA First Round	W 97–83; Stats	22–14	Dunkin' Donuts Center (10,788); Providence, Rhode Island
March 20*; 3:35 p.m., CBS	(14 MW)	vs. (6 MW) No. 15 Tennessee; NCAA Second Round	L 68–83; Stats	22–15	Dunkin' Donuts Center (11,271); Providence, Rhode Island
*Non-conference game. ^{#}Rankings from AP Poll. (#) Tournament seedings in parentheses. MW=NCAA Midwest Regional.

== Statistics ==
=== Team statistics ===
Final 2009–10 statistics

Record	Ohio	OPP
Scoring	2763	2569
Scoring Average	74.68	69.43
Field goals – Att	925–2153	905–2165
3-pt. Field goals – Att	278–759	222–711
Free throws – Att	635–883	537–767
Rebounds	1371	1397
Assists	524	515
Turnovers	473	566
Steals	278	214
Blocked Shots	97	130

=== Player statistics ===
			Minutes		Scoring		Total FGs			3-point FGs			Free-Throws			Rebounds								
Player	GP	GS	Tot	Avg	Pts	Avg	FG	FGA	Pct	3FG	3FA	Pct	FT	FTA	Pct	Off	Def	Tot	Avg	A	PF	TO	Stl	Blk
Armon Bassett	33	29	1150	34.8	564	17.1	164	421	0.39	72	208	0.346	164	202	0.812	9	99	108	3.3	117	44	77	41	2
D.J. Cooper	37	36	1313	35.5	498	13.5	156	417	0.374	65	204	0.319	121	158	0.766	67	131	198	5.4	218	76	99	93	11
Tommy Freeman	37	35	1017	27.5	388	10.5	115	239	0.481	93	195	0.477	65	76	0.855	15	58	73	2	37	89	44	18	3
DeVaughn Washington	32	20	823	25.7	363	11.3	121	240	0.504	0	2	0	121	176	0.688	84	88	172	5.4	20	94	59	33	13
Kenneth van Kempen	37	34	1028	27.8	251	6.8	112	246	0.455	0	5	0	27	39	0.692	67	180	247	6.7	26	124	45	20	23
Reggie Keely	37	17	602	16.3	200	5.4	83	167	0.497	0	0	0	34	84	0.405	64	94	158	4.3	19	84	41	12	27
James Kinney	19	3	426	22.4	185	9.7	69	172	0.401	31	96	0.323	16	21	0.762	3	26	29	1.5	29	34	27	15	3
Steven Coleman	10	4	248	24.8	113	11.3	31	77	0.403	12	30	0.4	39	46	0.848	6	36	42	4.2	25	35	15	15	3
Ivo Baltic	37	2	421	11.4	108	2.9	41	84	0.488	0	1	0	26	52	0.5	27	69	96	2.6	14	57	42	16	8
Asown Sayles	29	5	448	15.4	72	2.5	25	73	0.342	3	10	0.3	19	26	0.731	29	56	85	2.9	16	50	16	12	4
David McKinley	14	0	44	3.1	14	1	5	11	0.455	2	8	0.25	2	2	1	0	2	2	0.1	3	3	2	3	0
Adetunji Adedipe	16	0	30	1.9	7	0.4	3	6	0.5	0	0	0	1	1	1	2	4	6	0.4	0	6	1	0	0
Total	37	-	7550	-	2763	74.7	925	2153	0.430	278	759	0.366	635	883	0.719	443	928	1371	37.1	524	696	473	278	97
Opponents	37	-	7550	-	2569	69.4	905	2165	0.418	222	711	0.312	537	767	0.700	472	925	1397	37.8	515	746	566	214	130

Legend
GP	Games played	GS	Games started	Avg	Average per game
FG	Field-goals made	FGA	Field-goal attempts	Off	Offensive rebounds
Def	Defensive rebounds	A	Assists	TO	Turnovers
Blk	Blocks	Stl	Steals	High	Team high

== Awards and honors ==
=== All-MAC Awards ===
Postseason All-MAC teams
Team	Player	Position	Year
MAC Freshman of the Year	DJ Cooper	G	Fr.
All-MAC Freshamn Team	DJ Cooper	G	Fr.
