= Jeremy Hazell =

American basketball player (born 1986)

Free agent
- Position: Shooting guard

Personal information
- Born: March 25, 1986 (age 40) East Harlem, New York, U.S.
- Listed height: 6 ft 5 in (1.96 m)
- Listed weight: 190 lb (86 kg)

Career information
- High school: The Patterson School (Lenoir, North Carolina)
- College: Seton Hall (2007–2011)
- NBA draft: 2011: undrafted
- Playing career: 2011–present

Career history
- 2011: Lucentum Alicante
- 2011–2012: Bakersfield Jam
- 2012: Cañeros del Este
- 2014: Juventus
- 2014–2015: Virtus Bologna
- 2015–2016: Élan Chalon
- 2016: Muratbey Uşak Sportif
- 2017: VL Pesaro

Career highlights
- French League All-Star (2016)

Jeremy Hazell (born March 25, 1986) is an American professional basketball player who last played for Victoria Libertas Pesaro of the Lega Basket Serie A (LBA). He played college basketball for Seton Hall.

== College career ==
Hazell came to prominence as one of the stars of the Seton Hall University men's basketball team. In 2008–09, Hazell was named to the All-Big East Third Team after scoring 22.7 points per game, good for second in the Big East in scoring. Following the 2008–09 season, Hazell was named to the All-Big East Second Team. Prior to 2010–11 season, Hazell was named to the All-Big East First Team. He attended The Patterson School in Lenoir, North Carolina. Hazell joined the 2,000-point club versus Rutgers on February 12, 2011, and was named to All-Big East 3rd Team in 2011 and Named to All-Met First Team.

== Professional career ==
Hazell declared himself eligible for the 2010 NBA draft but withdrew on May 6 and maintained his collegiate eligibility for the 2010–11 season.

Hazell went undrafted in the 2011 NBA draft. On September 8, 2011, he signed with CB Lucentum Alicante of Liga ACB in Spain. On November 9, 2011, he was released. In December 2011, he joined the training camp roster of the Phoenix Suns. After being released by Phoenix, he signed with the Bakersfield Jam of the NBA Development League. Hazell was later waived by the Jam for personal reasons. In March 2012, Hazell signed with Venezuelan team, Marinos de Anzoátegui. He was released days later before playing a game, due to issues with his international transfer.

In January 2014, he signed with BC Juventus of the Lithuanian Basketball League for the rest of the season.

In August 2014, he signed with Virtus Bologna of Italy for the 2014–15 Lega Basket Serie A season.

On July 29, 2015, he signed with French club Élan Chalon for the 2015–16 LNB Pro A season.

On June 18, 2016, he signed with Turkish club Muratbey Uşak Sportif. On October 24, 2016, he parted ways with Uşak after appearing in two league games and three Champions League games. On February 11, 2017, he signed with Italian club Victoria Libertas Pesaro for the rest of the 2016–17 Lega Basket Serie A season.

== The Basketball Tournament ==
Jeremy Hazell played for Hall In in the 2018 edition of The Basketball Tournament. In 2 games, he averaged 13 points, 7 rebounds, and 2.5 steals per game. Hall In reached the second round before falling to the Golden Eagles.

== Robbery incident ==
According to a Seton Hall University spokesman, Hazell was the victim of a robbery attempt and shot in the G.W. Carver N.Y.H.C. development located in East Harlem on the night of December 25, 2010. He was taken to Manhattan hospital to treat a wound under his right arm, which was not life-threatening.
