= 2009–10 Robert Morris Colonials men's basketball team =

American college basketball season

2009–10 Robert Morris Colonials men's basketball

NEC Tournament Champions

NCAA tournament, Round of 64
- Conference: Northeast Conference
- Record: 23–12 (15–3 NEC)
- Head coach: Mike Rice Jr. (3rd season)
- Assistant coaches: Andrew Toole; Jimmy Martelli; Robby Pridgen
- Home arena: Charles L. Sewall Center

2009–10 Northeast Conference men's basketball standings
	Conf.				Overall
Team	W		L	PCT	W		L	PCT
Quinnipiac	15	–	3	.833	23	–	9	.719
Robert Morris †	15	–	3	.833	23	–	12	.657
Mount St. Mary's	12	–	6	.667	16	–	15	.516
Long Island	11	–	7	.611	14	–	17	.452
Fairleigh Dickinson	10	–	8	.556	11	–	21	.344
St. Francis (PA)	9	–	9	.500	11	–	19	.367
Central Connecticut	9	–	9	.500	12	–	18	.400
Monmouth	8	–	10	.444	12	–	19	.387
St. Francis (NY)	8	–	10	.444	11	–	18	.379
Sacred Heart	7	–	11	.389	14	–	15	.483
Wagner	3	–	15	.167	5	–	26	.161
Bryant*	1	–	17	.056	1	–	29	.033
† 2010 Northeast Conference tournament winner As of March 17, 2010; Rankings from AP Poll; *Ineligible for conference tournament

The 2009–10 Robert Morris Colonials men's basketball team represented Robert Morris University in the 2009–2010 NCAA Division I basketball season. Robert Morris was coached by Mike Rice Jr. and played their home games at the Charles L. Sewall Center in Moon Township, PA. The Colonials are a members of the Northeast Conference. They finished the season 23–12, 15–3 in NEC play. They won the 2010 Northeast Conference men's basketball tournament to earn the conference's automatic bid to the 2010 NCAA Division I men's basketball tournament. They earned a 15 seed in the South Region and played 2 seed Villanova in the first round. The Colonials took Villanova to overtime before falling 73–70 to end their season.

== Roster ==
#	Name	Height	Weight (lbs.)	Position	Class	Hometown	Previous Team(s)
1	Rob Robinson	6'8"	215	F	Sr.	Waldorf, MD, U.S.	Globe Institute of Technology
2	Mezie Nwigwe	6'4"	195	G	Sr.	Hyattsville, MD, U.S.	High Point HS
3	Velton Jones	6'0"	170	G	Fr.	Philadelphia, PA, U.S.	Northeast HS
4	Karon Abraham	6'5"	196	G	Fr.	Paterson, NJ, U.S.	Harp Academy
5	Coron Williams	6'2"	170	G	Fr.	Midlothian, VA, U.S.	Christchurch School
12	Jimmy Langhurst	5'11"	185	G	Sr.	Willard, OH, U.S.	Willard HS
14	Gary Wallace	6'3"	200	G	Jr.	Montclair, NJ, U.S.	Seton Hall Prep
15	Khalif Foster	6'3"	210	G	So.	Philadelphia, PA, U.S.	Academy of the New Church
24	Dallas Green	6'8"	210	F	Sr.	Indianapolis, IN, U.S.	Northwest HS
25	Brad Piehl	6'8"	215	F/C	Fr.	New Knoxville, OH, U.S.	New Knoxville HS
34	Russell Johnson	6'6"	180	F	Fr.	Chester, PA, U.S.	Chester HS
35	Lijah Thompson	6'7"	200	F	Fr.	Philadelphia, PA, U.S.	Monsignor Bonner HS
44	Josiah Whitehead	6'6"	225	F	Sr.	Portsmouth, VA, U.S.	Cecil CC

== 2009–10 schedule and results ==
- All times are Eastern

Date time, TV	Rank^{#}	Opponent^{#}	Result	Record	Site (attendance) city, state
Exhibition
11/5/2009*; 7:00pm		Shippensburg	W 78–47		Charles L. Sewall Center (887); Moon Township, PA
Regular Season
11/11/2009*; 7:00pm, ESPNU		at Syracuse; Coaches Vs. Cancer Classic	L 60–100	0–1	Carrier Dome (15,594); Syracuse, NY
11/16/2009*; 7:30pm		at Penn State	L 61–80	0–2	Bryce Jordan Center (6,286); University Park, PA
11/20/2009*; 5:00pm		vs. Detroit; Coaches Vs. Cancer Classic	L 59–71	0–3	SEFCU Arena (458); Albany, NY
11/21/2009*; 4:30pm		vs. Alcorn State; Coaches Vs. Cancer Classic	W 107–76	1–3	SEFCU Arena (433); Albany, NY
11/22/2009*; 9:00pm		at Albany; Coaches Vs. Cancer Classic	L 66–71	1–4	SEFCU Arena (1,914); Albany, NY
12/3/2009; 7:00pm		Mount St. Mary's	W 63–57	2–4 (1–0)	Charles L. Sewall Center (1,211); Moon Township, PA
12/5/2009; 7:00pm		Wagner	W 73–70	3–4 (2–0)	Charles L. Sewall Center (1,057); Moon Township, PA
12/12/2009*; 7:00pm		at Duquesne	L 54–59	3–5	A. J. Palumbo Center (2,594); Pittsburgh, PA
12/15/2009*; 7:00pm		at Cleveland State	W 78–70	4–5	Wolstein Center (1,257); Cleveland, OH
12/19/2009*; 7:00pm		Appalachian State	L 52–65	4–6	Charles L. Sewall Center (837); Moon Township, PA
12/22/2009*; 7:00pm		Kent State	L 72–76	4–7	Charles L. Sewall Center (643); Moon Township, PA
12/30/2009*; 5:30pm		at Youngstown State	W 72–67	5–7	Beeghly Center (1,611); Youngstown, OH
1/2/2010*; 7:00pm		Ohio	W 81–79	6–7	Charles L. Sewall Center (763); Moon Township, PA
1/4/2010*; 7:00pm		Morgan State	W 78–75	7–7	Charles L. Sewall Center (648); Moon Township, PA
1/7/2010; 7:30pm		at Long Island	L 64–74	7–8 (2–1)	Athletic, Recreation & Wellness Center (543); Brooklyn, NY
1/9/2010; 4:30pm		at St. Francis Brooklyn	W 67–63	8–8 (3–1)	Pope Physical Education Center (307); Brooklyn Heights, NY
1/14/2010; 7:30pm		Fairleigh Dickinson	W 80–73	9–8 (4–1)	Charles L. Sewall Center (1,058); Moon Township, PA
1/16/2010; 7:00pm		Monmouth	W 78–67	10–8 (5–1)	Charles L. Sewall Center (898); Moon Township, PA
1/21/2010; 7:30pm		at Fairleigh Dickinson	W 65–50	11–8 (6–1)	Rothman Center (459); Hackensack, NJ
1/23/2010; 4:00pm, FSN Pittsburgh		at Monmouth	W 66–53	12–8 (7–1)	William T. Boylan Gymnasium (2,065); West Long Branch, NJ
1/28/2010; 7:30pm		Long Island	W 66–58	13–8 (8–1)	Charles L. Sewall Center (934); Moon Township, PA
1/30/2010; 7:00pm		St. Francis Brooklyn	W 74–56	14–8 (9–1)	Charles L. Sewall Center (1,124); Moon Township, PA
2/4/2010; 7:30pm		at Saint Francis (PA)	W 76–67	15–8 (10–1)	DeGol Arena (1,341); Loretto, PA
2/6/2010; 7:00pm		Saint Francis (PA)	W 75–63	16–8 (11–1)	Charles L. Sewall Center (238); Moon Township, PA
2/8/2010*; 8:00pm, FSN Pittsburgh		at No. 25 Pittsburgh	L 53–77	16–9	Petersen Events Center (7,211); Pittsburgh, PA
2/11/2010; 8:00pm		at Central Connecticut	W 69–60	17–9 (12–1)	William H. Detrick Gymnasium (1,615); New Britain, CT
2/13/2010; 3:30pm		at Bryant	W 52–42	18–9 (13–1)	Chace Athletic Center (823); Smithfield, RI
2/18/2010; 7:30pm		Sacred Heart	W 64–39	19–9 (14–1)	Charles L. Sewall Center (1,134); Moon Township, PA
2/20/2010; 7:00pm		Quinnipiac	L 79–87	19–10 (14–2)	Charles L. Sewall Center (1,867); Moon Township, PA
2/25/2010; 7:00pm		at Wagner	W 76–55	20–10 (15–2)	Spiro Sports Center (667); Staten Island, NY
2/27/2010; 4:00pm		at Mount St. Mary's	L 61–63	20–11 (15–3)	Knott Arena (2,121); Emmitsburg, MD
2010 Northeast Conference men's basketball tournament
3/4/2010; 7:00pm	(2)	(7) Central Connecticut; Quarterfinals	W 71–63	21–11	Charles L. Sewall Center (1,478); Moon Township, PA
3/7/2010; 7:00pm	(2)	(3) Mount St. Mary's; Semifinals	W 80–62	22–11	Charles L. Sewall Center (1,538); Moon Township, PA
3/10/2010; 7:00pm, ESPN2	(2)	at (1) Quinnipiac; Finals	W 52–50	23–11	TD Bank Sports Center (3,607); Hamden, CT
2010 NCAA Division I men's basketball tournament
3/18/2010*; 12:30pm, CBS	(15)	vs. (2) No. 9 Villanova; First round	L 70–73 ^{OT}	23–12	Dunkin' Donuts Center (11,106); Providence, RI
*Non-conference game. ^{#}Rankings from AP Poll. (#) Tournament seedings in parentheses.
