= Julian Vaughn =

American basketball player

Personal information
- Born: December 16, 1988 (age 37) Fairfax, Virginia, U.S.
- Listed height: 6 ft 10 in (2.08 m)
- Listed weight: 250 lb (113 kg)

Career information
- High school: South Lakes (Reston, Virginia); Oak Hill Academy (Mouth of Wilson, Virginia)
- College: Florida State (2007–2008); Georgetown (2008–2011)
- NBA draft: 2011: undrafted
- Playing career: 2011–2017
- Position: Power forward / center

Career history
- 2011–2012: Antwerp Giants
- 2012–2013: Keravnos
- 2013: Indios de San Francisco
- 2013–2014: KAOD
- 2014–2015: PAOK
- 2015–2016: ČEZ Nymburk
- 2016–2017: Stelmet Zielona Góra
- 2017: Indios de San Francisco

Career highlights
- Czech League champion (2016); Virginia Mr. Basketball (2007)

Julian Vaughn (born December 16, 1988) is an American former professional basketball player. He is a 2.08 m (6 ft 10 in) tall power forward-center.

== College career ==
Vaughn played college basketball at Florida State University, with the Florida State Seminoles in 2007–08, and at Georgetown University, with the Georgetown Hoyas, from 2008 to 2011.

== Professional career ==
After going undrafted at the 2011 NBA draft, Vaughn signed with the Belgian League club Antwerp Giants for the 2011–12 season.

In August 2012, he moved to the Cypriot League club Keravnos for the 2012–13 season. In the summer of 2013, he played with the Indios de San Francisco of Dominican Republic.

In September 2013, he moved to the Greek League club KAOD for the 2013–14 season. On August 1, 2015, he signed a one-year deal with another Greek club PAOK.

On July 8, 2015, he signed a one-year deal with ČEZ Nymburk.

On August 19, 2016, he signed a two-year deal with Polish club Stelmet Zielona Góra. On February 13, 2017, he parted ways with Zielona Góra.
