= Sam Houston Bearkats men's basketball statistical leaders =

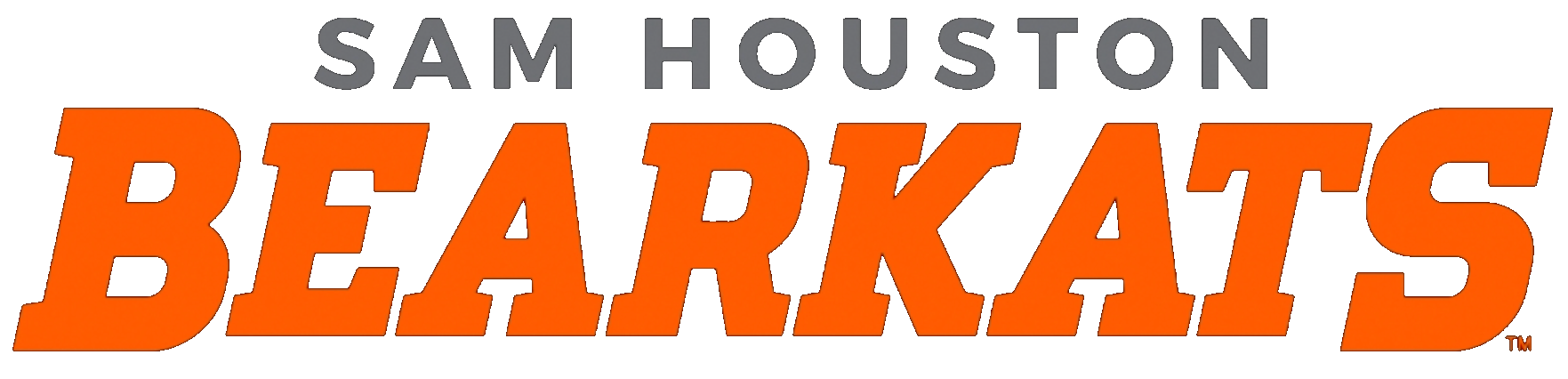

The Sam Houston Bearkats men's basketball statistical leaders are individual statistical leaders of the Sam Houston Bearkats men's basketball program in various categories, including points, assists, blocks, rebounds, and steals. Within those areas, the lists identify single-game, single-season, and career leaders. The Bearkats represent Sam Houston State University in the NCAA Division I Conference USA.

Sam Houston began competing in intercollegiate basketball in 1917. However, the school's record book does not generally list records from before the 1950s, as records from before this period are often incomplete and inconsistent. Since scoring was much lower in this era, and teams played much fewer games during a typical season, it is likely that few or no players from this era would appear on these lists anyway.

The NCAA did not officially record assists as a stat until the 1983–84 season, and blocks and steals until the 1985–86 season, but Sam Houston record books includes players in these stats before these seasons. These lists are updated through the end of the 2020–21 season.

== Scoring ==
Career
Rk	Player	Points	Seasons
1	James Lister	2,304	1969–70 1970–71 1971–72 1972–73
2	Bruce Allen	1,995	1982–83 1983–84 1984–85 1985–86
3	Jeremy Burkhalter	1,689	1997–98 1998–99 1999–00 2000–01
4	Anthony Carroll	1,495	1978–79 1979–80 1980–81 1981–82
5	Derick Preston	1,451	1992–93 1993–94 1994–95 1995–96
6	David Amaya	1,445	1996–97 1997–98 1998–99 1999–00
7	Ryan Bright	1,429	2004–05 2005–06 2006–07 2007–08
8	Tracy Pearson	1,406	1985–86 1986–87 1987–88 1988–89
9	Tom Sewell	1,375	1951–52 1952–53 1953–54
10	Dakari Henderson	1,325	2013–14 2014–15 2015–16 2016–17

Season
Rk	Player	Points	Season
1	James Lister	674	1970–71
2	Lamar Wilkerson	655	2024–25
3	Bill Mehrens	646	1967–68
4	Gilberto Clavell	603	2010–11
5	James Lister	596	1969–70
	Savion Flagg	596	2021–22
7	Bruce Allen	563	1984–85
	Gilberto Clavell	563	2009–10
9	James Lister	556	1971–72
10	Seneca Wall	555	2000–01

Single game
Rk	Player	Points	Season	Opponent
1	James Lister	47	1970–71	East Texas State
2	James Lister	45	1969–70	Tarleton State
	Seneca Wall	45	2000–01	UT Arlington
4	James Lister	44	1969–70	Angelo State
5	Murray Mitchell	43	1947–48	Trinity (TX)
6	James Lister	39	1970–71	Western New Mexico
	James Lister	39	1969–70	Tarleton State
	Melvin Moore	39	1975–76	Texas A&I
9	Robert White	38	1970–71	Howard Payne
10	Walter Lee	37	1954–55	Texas Lutheran
	Mike Newell	37	1971–72	Stephen F. Austin
	Melvin Moore	37	1973–74	Dallas Baptist
	Regi Harris	37	1982–83	Mary Hardin-Baylor
	Milton Hamilton	37	1990–91	Concordia Lutheran
	Mike Dillard	37	1994–95	Mary Hardin-Baylor
	Corey Allmond	37	2009–10	Kentucky

== Rebounds ==
Career
Rk	Player	Rebounds	Seasons
1	James Lister	1,682	1969–70 1970–71 1971–72 1972–73
2	Ryan Bright	967	2004–05 2005–06 2006–07 2007–08
3	Bruce Allen	911	1982–83 1983–84 1984–85 1985–86
4	Robert White	894	1970–71 1971–72 1972–73
5	Michael Holyfield	769	2011–12 2012–13 2013–14 2014–15
6	Tracy Pearson	733	1985–86 1986–87 1987–88 1988–89
7	James Holcombe	662	1973–74 1974–75 1975–76
8	Anthony Carroll	635	1978–79 1979–80 1980–81 1981–82
9	David Amaya	628	1996–97 1997–98 1998–99 1999–00
10	Eddy Fobbs	618	2000–01 2001–02 2002–03 2004–05

Season
Rk	Player	Rebounds	Season
1	James Lister	473	1971–72
2	James Lister	459	1970–71
3	James Lister	376	1972–73
4	James Lister	374	1969–70
5	Ryan Bright	337	2007–08
6	Robert White	327	1970–71
	Floyd Allen	327	1973–74
8	Robert White	306	1971–72
9	Donald Cole	287	2001–02
	Chris Gilbreath, Jr.	287	2017–18

Single game
Rk	Player	Rebounds	Season	Opponent
1	James Lister	30	1971–72	Stephen F. Austin
2	James Lister	28	1971–72	Howard Payne
	Floyd Allen	28	1973–74	Southern
4	James Lister	25	1971–72	Sul Ross
	James Lister	25	1971–72	Angelo State
6	James Lister	24	1970–71	McMurry
7	James Lister	23	1971–72	Western New Mexico
8	James Lister	21	1970–71	East Texas State
	James Lister	21	1970–71	Stephen F. Austin
	James Lister	21	1970–71	Texas A&I
	Dennis Green	21	1988–89	Southwest Texas

== Assists ==
Career
Rk	Player	Assists	Seasons
1	Scott Horstman	813	1980–81 1981–82 1982–83 1983–84
2	Boney Watson	569	1996–97 1997–98 1998–99 1999–00
3	Ashton Mitchell	567	2006–07 2007–08 2008–09 2009–10
4	Tim Keyes	384	1986–87 1987–88 1988–89
5	Paul Baxter	362	2012–13 2013–14 2014–15 2015–16 2016–17
6	Jejuan Plair	347	2005–06 2006–07
7	Bruce Hodges	346	1984–85 1985–86 1986–87 1987–88
8	Shamir McDaniel	339	2004–05 2005–06 2006–07 2007–08
9	Ryan Bright	334	2004–05 2005–06 2006–07 2007–08
10	Josh Delaney	333	2015–16 2016–17 2017–18 2018–19

Season
Rk	Player	Assists	Season
1	Scott Horstman	241	1983–84
2	Scott Horstman	224	1982–83
3	Ashton Mitchell	206	2008–09
4	Ray Johnson	193	1990–91
5	Tom Keyes	186	1988–89
6	Boney Watson	185	1999–00
7	Scott Horstman	183	1980–81
8	Robert Shannon	181	2002–03
9	Jejuan Plair	175	2005–06
10	Jejuan Plair	172	2006–07

Single game
Rk	Player	Assists	Season	Opponent
1	Bill Froechntnich	18	1975–76	Abilene Christian
	Scott Horstman	18	1983–84	Dallas Baptist
3	Ray Johnson	16	1990–91	Northeast Louisiana
4	Scott Horstman	15	1980–81	Abilene Christian
	Scott Horstman	15	1980–81	Howard Payne
	Scott Horstman	15	1982–83	Texas Lutheran
	Scott Horstman	15	1982–83	Southwest Texas
	Jejuan Plair	15	2005–06	Stephen F. Austin
	Ashton Mitchell	15	2008–09	Wright State

== Steals ==
Career
Rk	Player	Steals	Seasons
1	Scott Horstman	269	1980–81 1981–82 1982–83 1983–84
2	Bruce Hodges	235	1984–85 1985–86 1986–87 1987–88
3	Boney Watson	191	1996–97 1997–98 1998–99 1999–00
4	Ashton Mitchell	186	2006–07 2007–08 2008–09 2009–10
5	Ryan Bright	179	2004–05 2005–06 2006–07 2007–08
6	Lorenzo Duncan	171	1984–85 1985–86
	Tim Keyes	171	1986–87 1987–88 1988–89
8	Seneca Wall	167	1999–00 2000–01
9	Paul Baxter	144	2012–13 2013–14 2014–15 2015–16 2016–17
10	Bruce Allen	143	1982–83 1983–84 1984–85 1985–86

Season
Rk	Player	Steals	Season
1	Seneca Wall	103	2000–01
2	Lorenzo Duncan	88	1985–86
3	Lorenzo Duncan	83	1984–85
4	Tom Keyes	78	1988–89
5	Scott Horstman	72	1983–84

Single game
Rk	Player	Steals	Season	Opponent
1	Bruce Hodges	9	1986–87	Northwestern State
2	Lorenzo Duncan	8	1984–85	Stephen F. Austin
	Seneca Wall	8	2000–01	Southwest Missouri
	Ryan Bright	8	2007–08	McNeese

== Blocks ==
Career
Rk	Player	Blocks	Seasons
1	Eddy Fobbs	267	2000–01 2001–02 2002–03 2004–05
2	Michael Holyfield	191	2011–12 2012–13 2013–14 2014–15
3	Frank Mata	122	1993–94 1994–95 1995–96
4	Yommy Sangodeyi	118	1981–82 1982–83 1983–84
5	Donald Cole	98	2001–02 2002–03
6	Ryan Bright	97	2004–05 2005–06 2006–07 2007–08
7	Quinton McLeod	76	1992–93 1993–94 1994–95 1995–96
8	James Sears	75	1989–90 1990–91 1991–92
9	John Gardiner	74	2005–06 2007–08
10	Wilder Auguste	73	2003–04 2004–05

Season
Rk	Player	Blocks	Season
1	Michael Holyfield	86	2014–15
2	Eddy Fobbs	79	2002–03
3	Eddy Fobbs	68	2004–05
4	Eddy Fobbs	66	2000–01
5	Michael Holyfield	61	2013–14

Single game
Rk	Player	Blocks	Season	Opponent
1	Eddy Fobbs	8	2002–03	Lamar
2	Eddy Fobbs	7	2004–05	Binghamton
