= 2009–10 Florida Atlantic Owls men's basketball team =

American college basketball season

2009–10 Florida Atlantic Owls men's basketball
- Conference: Sun Belt Conference
- East Division
- Record: 14-16 (10-8 SBC)
- Head coach: Mike Jarvis
- Home arena: FAU Arena

2009–10 Sun Belt Conference men's basketball standings
	Conf.				Overall
Team	W		L	PCT	W		L	PCT
East
Troy	13	–	5	.722	20	–	13	.606
Middle Tennessee	13	–	5	.722	19	–	14	.576
Western Kentucky	12	–	6	.667	21	–	13	.618
Florida Atlantic	10	–	8	.556	14	–	16	.467
South Alabama	8	–	10	.444	17	–	15	.531
FIU	4	–	14	.222	7	–	25	.219
West
North Texas†	13	–	5	.722	24	–	9	.727
Arkansas State	11	–	7	.611	17	–	14	.548
Denver	10	–	8	.556	19	–	13	.594
Louisiana–Lafayette	10	–	8	.556	13	–	17	.433
Louisiana–Monroe	6	–	12	.333	12	–	19	.387
Arkansas–Little Rock	4	–	14	.222	8	–	22	.267
New Orleans	3	–	15	.167	8	–	22	.267
† 2010 Sun Belt Conference tournament winner Rankings from AP Poll

The 2009–10 Florida Atlantic Owls men's basketball team represented Florida Atlantic University in the 2009–10 NCAA Division I men's basketball season. The Owls, led by head coach Mike Jarvis, played their home games at FAU Arena in Boca Raton, Florida, as members of the Sun Belt Conference.

On December 19, 2009, Florida Atlantic lost in the Orange Bowl Basketball Classic to Miami 87-69.

The Owls finished the 2009–10 season with a 14–16 record. They lost in the first round of the Sun Belt tournament to South Alabama 52–51 in March 2010.
