= 2009–10 Lehigh Mountain Hawks men's basketball team =

American college basketball season

2009–10 Lehigh Mountain Hawks men's basketball

Patriot League Regular Season Champions Patriot League tournament champions

NCAA tournament, Round of 64
- Conference: Patriot League
- Record: 22–11 (10–4 Patriot)
- Head coach: Brett Reed (3rd season)
- Assistant coaches: Antoni Wyche; Ryan Krueger; Stephen Ott
- Home arena: Stabler Arena

2009–10 Patriot League men's basketball standings
	Conf.				Overall
Team	W		L	PCT	W		L	PCT
Lehigh†	10	–	4	.714	19	–	10	.655
Bucknell	9	–	5	.643	14	–	16	.467
Lafayette	8	–	6	.571	17	–	12	.586
American	7	–	7	.500	10	–	19	.345
Navy	7	–	7	.500	13	–	16	.448
Colgate	6	–	8	.429	10	–	18	.357
Holy Cross	5	–	9	.357	8	–	21	.276
Army	4	–	10	.286	14	–	14	.500
† 2010 Patriot League tournament winner As of March 1, 2010; Rankings from AP Poll

The 2009–10 Lehigh Mountain Hawks men's basketball team represented Lehigh University during the 2009–10 NCAA Division I men's basketball season. The Mountain Hawks, led by third-year head coach Brett Reed, played their home games at Stabler Arena and were members of the Patriot League. They finished the season 22–11, 10–4 in Patriot League play to finish in first place in the conference.

Following the regular season, Lehigh won the Patriot League Basketball tournament to earn the conference's automatic bid into the 2010 NCAA tournament. This was their fourth NCAA Tournament appearance with their previous trip coming in 2004. As the No. 16 seed in the Midwest region, they fell to No. 1 seed Kansas in the Round of 64.

== Roster ==
2009–10 Lehigh Mountain Hawks men's basketball team
Players
Coaches

Pos.	#	Name	Height	Weight	Year	Previous school	Hometown
G	1	Marquis Hall	5 ft 11 in (1.8 m)	190 lb (86 kg)	Sr		Portland, Oregon
G	3	CJ McCollum	6 ft 3 in (1.91 m)	165 lb (75 kg)	Fr	GlenOak	Canton, Ohio
F	10	Zahir Carrington	6 ft 7 in (2.01 m)	220 lb (100 kg)	Sr	Masterman	Philadelphia, Pennsylvania
F	20	Holden Greiner	6 ft 8 in (2.03 m)	215 lb (98 kg)	Fr	St. Francis	Traverse City, Michigan
G	23	Michael Ojo	6 ft 5 in (1.96 m)	200 lb (91 kg)	Jr		Santa Monica, California
F	42	Gabe Knutson	6 ft 9 in (2.06 m)	220 lb (100 kg)	Fr	Waukee	Urbandale, Iowa

Head coach

- Brett Reed

Assistant coach(es)

Legend

- (C) Team captain
- (S) Suspended
- (I) Ineligible
- (W) Walk-on
- Injured
- Current redshirt

Roster

== Schedule and results ==
Date time, TV	Rank^{#}	Opponent^{#}	Result	Record	Site (attendance) city, state
Non-conference regular season
Nov 13, 2009*; 7:00 pm		at Richmond	L 53–65	0–1	Robins Center (4,139); Richmond, Virginia
Nov 16, 2009*; 7:05 pm		at Rider	L 71–86	0–2	Alumni Gymnasium (1,650); Lawrenceville, New Jersey
Nov 18, 2009*; 7:35 pm		Quinnipiac	W 79–71	1–2	Stabler Arena (684); Bethlehem, Pennsylvania
Nov 23, 2009*; 7:05 pm		Monmouth	W 86–74	2–2	Stabler Arena (620); Bethlehem, Pennsylvania
Nov 25, 2009*; 7:00 pm		at Saint Francis (PA)	W 76–67	3–2	DeGol Arena (714); Loretto, Pennsylvania
Nov 30, 2009*; 7:05 pm		Stony Brook	L 52–71	3–3	Stabler Arena (609); Bethlehem, Pennsylvania
Dec 3, 2009*; 7:00 pm		at Columbia	L 70–75	3–4	Levien Gymnasium (626); New York, New York
Dec 5, 2009*; 2:00 pm		at Dayton	L 71–89	3–5	University of Dayton Arena (12,719); Dayton, Ohio
Dec 17, 2009*; 7:05 pm		Dartmouth	W 66–58	4–5	Stabler Arena (622); Bethlehem, Pennsylvania
Dec 20, 2009*; 7:00 pm		at Saint Joseph's	L 66–77	4–6	Hagan Arena (3,208); Philadelphia, Pennsylvania
Dec 22, 2009*; 7:05 pm		Marist	W 66–55	5–6	Stabler Arena (637); Bethlehem, Pennsylvania
Dec 28, 2009*; 7:00 pm		at Longwood	W 89–78	6–6	Willett Hall (528); Farmville, Virginia
Dec 30, 2009*; 7:30 pm		at Delaware State	W 73–66 ^{OT}	7–6	Memorial Hall (172); Dover, Delaware
Jan 2, 2010*; 7:35 pm		NJIT	W 86–79	8–6	Stabler Arena (1,032); Bethlehem, Pennsylvania
Jan 5, 2010*; 7:05 pm		Yale	W 75–69	9–6	Stabler Arena (605); Bethlehem, Pennsylvania
Patriot League regular season
Jan 9, 2010; 7:05 pm		American	W 78–67	10–6 (1–0)	Stabler Arena (925); Bethlehem, Pennsylvania
Jan 14, 2010; 7:00 pm, CBS College Sports		at Navy	L 83–94	10–7 (1–1)	Alumni Hall (2,608); Annapolis, Maryland
Jan 17, 2010; 2:00 pm		at Army	W 73–55	11–7 (2–1)	Christl Arena (1,005); West Point, New York
Jan 20, 2010; 7:05 pm, Service Electric 2 Sports		Colgate	W 74–60	12–7 (3–1)	Stabler Arena (1,012); Bethlehem, Pennsylvania
Jan 23, 2010; 7:05 pm, Service Electric 2 Sports		Lafayette	W 75–57	13–7 (4–1)	Stabler Arena (3,849); Bethlehem, Pennsylvania
Jan 27, 2010; 7:00 pm		at Bucknell	L 76–81 ^{OT}	13–8 (4–2)	Sojka Pavilion (2,041); Lewisburg, Pennsylvania
Jan 31, 2010; 12:00 pm, CBS College Sports		at Holy Cross	W 78–60	14–8 (5–2)	Hart Center (2,948); Worcester, Massachusetts
Feb 6, 2010; 2:00 pm		at American	W 77–65	15–8 (6–2)	Bender Arena (786); Washington, D.C.
Feb 10, 2010; 7:05 pm, Service Electric 2 Sports		Navy	L 78–85	15–9 (6–3)	Stabler Arena (329); Bethlehem, Pennsylvania
Feb 13, 2010; 7:05 pm, Service Electric 2 Sports		Army	W 78–66	16–9 (7–3)	Stabler Arena (1,513); Bethlehem, Pennsylvania
Feb 17, 2010; 7:00 pm		at Colgate	W 91–81	17–9 (8–3)	Cotterell Court (426); Hamilton, New York
Feb 21, 2010; 2:00 pm, CBS College Sports		at Lafayette	L 75–90	17–10 (8–4)	Kirby Sports Center (3,375); Easton, Pennsylvania
Feb 24, 2010; 7:05 pm, Service Electric 2 Sports		Bucknell	W 81–59	18–10 (9–4)	Stabler Arena (1,161); Bethlehem, Pennsylvania
Feb 27, 2010; 7:35 pm, Service Electric 2 Sports		Holy Cross	W 91–80	19–10 (10–4)	Stabler Arena (1,623); Bethlehem, Pennsylvania
2010 Patriot League tournament
Mar 3, 2010*; 7:05 pm, Service Electric 2 Sports	(1)	(8) Army; Quarterfinals	W 64–45	20–10	Stabler Arena (1,062); Bethlehem, Pennsylvania
Mar 7, 2010*; 8:05 pm, CBS College Sports	(1)	(4) American; Semifinals	W 79–57	21–10	Stabler Arena (1,296); Bethlehem, Pennsylvania
Mar 12, 2010*; 4:45 pm, ESPN2	(1)	(3) Lafayette; Championship Game	W 74–59	22–10	Stabler Arena (4,259); Bethlehem, Pennsylvania
2010 NCAA tournament
Mar 18, 2010*; 8:55 pm, CBS	(16 MW)	vs. (1 MW) No. 1 Kansas; Second Round	L 74–90	22–11	Ford Center (13,484); Oklahoma City, Oklahoma
*Non-conference game. ^{#}Rankings from AP Poll. (#) Tournament seedings in parentheses. MW=Midwest. All times are in Eastern Time (#) during NCAA Tournament is seed with Region.

== Awards and honors ==
- CJ McCollum – Patriot League Player of the Year, Patriot League Newcomer of the Year
