= 2009–10 Louisiana–Lafayette Ragin' Cajuns men's basketball team =

American college basketball season

2009–10 Louisiana–Lafayette Ragin' Cajuns men's basketball
- Conference: Sun Belt Conference
- West Division
- Record: 13–17 (10–8 Sun Belt)
- Head coach: Robert Lee (6th season)
- Assistant coaches: Nate Dixon; James Williams
- Home arena: Cajundome

2009–10 Sun Belt Conference men's basketball standings
	Conf.				Overall
Team	W		L	PCT	W		L	PCT
East
Troy	13	–	5	.722	20	–	13	.606
Middle Tennessee	13	–	5	.722	19	–	14	.576
Western Kentucky	12	–	6	.667	21	–	13	.618
Florida Atlantic	10	–	8	.556	14	–	16	.467
South Alabama	8	–	10	.444	17	–	15	.531
FIU	4	–	14	.222	7	–	25	.219
West
North Texas†	13	–	5	.722	24	–	9	.727
Arkansas State	11	–	7	.611	17	–	14	.548
Denver	10	–	8	.556	19	–	13	.594
Louisiana–Lafayette	10	–	8	.556	13	–	17	.433
Louisiana–Monroe	6	–	12	.333	12	–	19	.387
Arkansas–Little Rock	4	–	14	.222	8	–	22	.267
New Orleans	3	–	15	.167	8	–	22	.267
† 2010 Sun Belt Conference tournament winner Rankings from AP Poll

The 2009–10 Louisiana–Lafayette Ragin' Cajuns men's basketball team represented the University of Louisiana at Lafayette during the 2009–10 NCAA Division I men's basketball season. The Ragin' Cajuns, led by first-year head coach Bob Marlin, played their home games at the Cajundome and were members of the West Division of the Sun Belt Conference. They finished the season 13–17, 10–8 in Sun Belt play to finish in a two-way tie for third place in the standings. They competed in the 2010 Sun Belt Conference men's basketball tournament where they lost in the Quarterfinals to Louisiana–Monroe. They were not invited to any other post-season tournament.

Immediately following the loss in the conference tournament, the university announced that Robert Lee's contract had not been renewed. Lee's overall cumulative record was 80–100 at Louisiana–Lafayette, which would be highlighted by the best single-season record at 15–15 despite the 2004–05 record of 20–11 along with a Sun Belt Tournament championship and an NCAA Tournament appearance, which were all vacated due to academic ineligibility of Orien Greene.

== Roster ==
2009–10 Louisiana–Lafayette Ragin' Cajuns Men's Basketball Roster
Number	Name	Position	Height	Weight	Year	Hometown
0	Colby Baptiste	Forward	6–9	220	Junior	Lafayette, Louisiana
1	Tyren Johnson	Forward	6–8	204	Senior	Edgard, Louisiana
2	Randell Daigle	Guard	5–10	183	Senior	Lafayette, Louisiana
3	Travis Bureau	Guard	6–7	191	Junior	St. Amant, Louisiana
4	Phillip Jones	Guard	6–0	185	Sophomore	Maurice, Louisiana
4	Lamar Roberson	Forward	6–8	190	Senior	Baton Rouge, Louisiana
5	Brandon Dison	Guard	6–5	171	Senior	Westfield, Texas
11	Corey Bloom	Guard	6–5	215	Senior	New Orleans, Louisiana
12	Willie Lago	Guard	6–1	186	Senior	Reserve, Louisiana
20	Courtney Wallace	Forward/Center	6–8	238	Senior	Baton Rouge, Louisiana
21	Ryan McCoy	Guard	6–0	167	Senior	Houston, Texas
22	Raymone Andrews	Guard	6–2	171	Redshirt Freshman	Hammond, Louisiana
23	La'Ryan Gary	Guard/Forward	6–7	230	Senior	Carencro, Louisiana
31	Robert Vaughn	Guard	5–11	165	Redshirt Freshman	Grand Isle, Louisiana
33	Chris Gradnigo	Guard	6–7	281	Junior	Lake Charles, Louisiana
44	Javan Mitchell	Forward	6–9	248	Redshirt Freshman	Greensboro, North Carolina

== Schedule ==
Date time, TV	Rank^{#}	Opponent^{#}	Result	Record	Site city, state
Regular Season
11/10/2009*; 7:05 pm		West Alabama; Exhibition Game	W 90–69		Cajundome; Lafayette, Louisiana
11/14/2009*; 7:15 pm		Southern Miss	L 72–79	0–1	Cajundome (3,148); Lafayette, Louisiana
11/16/2009*; 7:15 pm		Louisiana College	W 90–68	1–1	Cajundome (2,514); Lafayette, Louisiana
11/24/2009*; 7:05 pm		Mobile	L 64–68	1–2	Cajundome (2,516); Lafayette, Louisiana
11/28/2009*; 7:00 pm		at McNeese State	L 58–60	1–3	Burton Coliseum (683); Lake Charles, Louisiana
12/01/2009*; 6:30 pm, CST		at LSU	L 58–66	1–4	Pete Maravich Assembly Center (8,107); Baton Rouge, Louisiana
12/05/2009*; 2:00 pm		at Sam Houston State	W 95–85	2–4	Bernard Johnson Coliseum (1,180); Huntsville, Texas
12/12/2009; 1:00 pm, Sun Belt Network		Florida Atlantic	W 81–74	3–4 (1–0)	Cajundome (2,620); Lafayette, Louisiana
12/15/2009*; 7:00 pm		at Southern Miss	L 53–71	3–5	Reed Green Coliseum (3,391); Hattiesburg, Mississippi
12/19/2009*; 7:05 pm		at Lamar	W 68–60	4–5	Montagne Center (2,435); Beaumont, Texas
12/21/2009*; 7:05 pm		Tulane	L 70–73	4–6	Cajundome (2,657); Lafayette, Louisiana
12/23/2009*; 6:00 pm, ESPN Full Court/ESPN360.com		at Louisville	L 69–84	4–7	KFC Yum! Center (18,894); Louisville, Kentucky
12/28/2009*; 7:05 pm		Centenary	L 68–73	4–8	Cajundome (2,246); Lafayette, Louisiana
12/31/2009; 5:00 pm		at Western Kentucky	L 65–77	4–9 (1–1)	E. A. Diddle Arena (3,959); Bowling Green, Kentucky
01/02/2010; 7:00 pm		at Middle Tennessee	L 58–68	4–10 (1–2)	Murphy Center (2,501); Murfreesboro, Tennessee
01/07/2010; 5:05 pm		North Texas	W 74–72	5–10 (2–2)	Cajundome (1,235); Lafayette, Louisiana
01/14/2010; 7:05 pm		Denver	W 55–49	6–10 (3-2)	Cajundome (2,417); Lafayette, Louisiana
01/16/2010; 7:00 pm		at Arkansas–Little Rock	L 69–76	6–11 (3–3)	Jack Stephens Center (3,532); Little Rock, Arkansas
01/21/2010; 7:05 pm		New Orleans	W 70–53	7–11 (4-3)	Cajundome (2,698); Lafayette, Louisiana
01/23/2010; 7:05 pm		Troy	W 69–54	8–11 (5–3)	Cajundome (3,328); Lafayette, Louisiana
01/28/2010; 7:05 pm		at Arkansas State	L 60–62	8–12 (5–4)	Convocation Center (3,968); Jonesboro, Arkansas
01/30/2010; 4:30 pm		at Louisiana–Monroe	W 72–67	9–12 (6–4)	Fant–Ewing Coliseum (1,638); Monroe, Louisiana
02/04/2010; 7:05 pm		FIU	W 83–63	10–12 (7–4)	Cajundome (3,388); Lafayette, Louisiana
02/06/2010; 7:05 pm		Arkansas–Little Rock	W 77–51	11–12 (8–4)	Cajundome (2,985); Lafayette, Louisiana
02/11/2010; 6:00 pm		at Florida Atlantic	L 72–76	11–13 (8–5)	FAU Arena (1,103); Boca Raton, Florida
02/13/2010; 7:05 pm		at South Alabama	L 65–67	11–14 (8–6)	Mitchell Center (2,569); Mobile, Alabama
02/18/2010; 7:05 pm		Arkansas State	W 56–54	12–14 (9–6)	Cajundome (2,936); Lafayette, Louisiana
02/20/2011; 7:05 pm		Louisiana–Monroe	W 73–71	13–14 (10–6)	Cajundome (3,984); Lafayette, Louisiana
02/25/2010; 7:00 pm		at North Texas	L 57–65	13–15 (10–7)	UNT Coliseum (4,377); Denton, Texas
02/27/2010; 6:00 pm, FSN Rocky Mountain		at Denver	L 47–63	13–16 (10–8)	Magness Arena (2,775); Denver, Colorado
2010 Sun Belt Conference men's basketball tournament
03/06/2010; 9:00 pm		vs. Louisiana–Monroe; First Round/Quarterfinals	L 75–76	13–17	Convention Center Court (4,979); Hot Springs, Arkansas
*Non-conference game. ^{#}Rankings from AP Poll. (#) Tournament seedings in parentheses. All times are in Central Time.
