= 2010 Southland Conference men's basketball tournament =

- Tournament logo
- Classification: Division I
- Season: 2009–10
- Teams: 8
- Site: Merrell Center; Katy, Texas
- Champions: Sam Houston State (2nd title)
- Winning coach: Bob Marlin (2nd title)
- MVP: Ashton Mitchell (Sam Houston State)
- Attendance: 3,573 (championship)
- Television: ESPN2

2009–10 Southland Conference men's basketball standings
	Conf.				Overall
Team	W		L	PCT	W		L	PCT
East
Stephen F. Austin	11	–	5	.688	23	–	9	.719
Southeastern Louisiana	10	–	6	.625	19	–	12	.613
Nicholls State	7	–	9	.438	11	–	19	.367
Northwestern State	5	–	10	.333	10	–	19	.345
McNeese State	5	–	11	.313	10	–	20	.333
Central Arkansas	3	–	13	.188	9	–	21	.300
West
Sam Houston State†	14	–	2	.875	25	–	8	.758
Texas A&M–Corpus Christi	10	–	6	.625	17	–	15	.531
UTSA	9	–	7	.563	19	–	11	.633
Texas State	9	–	7	.563	15	–	16	.484
Texas–Arlington	8	–	8	.500	16	–	14	.533
Lamar	5	–	11	.313	14	–	18	.438
† 2010 Southland tournament winner As of March 18, 2010; Rankings from AP poll

The 2010 Southland Conference men's basketball tournament, a part of the 2009-10 NCAA Division I men's basketball season, took place March 10–13, 2010 at the Merrell Center in Katy, Texas. The winner of the tournament received the Southland Conference's automatic bid to the 2010 NCAA Tournament. Had the #1 seed Sam Houston State not won the conference tournament, they would have received an automatic bid to the 2010 NIT.

Sam Houston State won the tournament by defeating Stephen F. Austin in the championship game, earning their first NCAA tournament berth since 2003.

== Format ==
The top eight teams, regardless of divisional standing, receive a berth in the conference tournament. The championship game was broadcast nationally on ESPN2.

== Bracket ==
Quarterfinals; Wednesday, March 10
1	Sam Houston State	62
8	Nicholls State	57
4	Southeastern Louisiana	79
5	Texas State	78^{OT}
2	Stephen F. Austin	77
7	Texas–Arlington	54
3	Texas A&M–Corpus Christi	78
6	UTSA	66

Semifinals; Thursday, March 11
1	Sam Houston State	88
4	Southeastern Louisiana	85
2	Stephen F. Austin	60
3	Texas A&M–Corpus Christi	53

Finals; Saturday, March 13
1	Sam Houston State	64
2	Stephen F. Austin	48
