= Brett Reed (basketball) =

American basketball player and coach

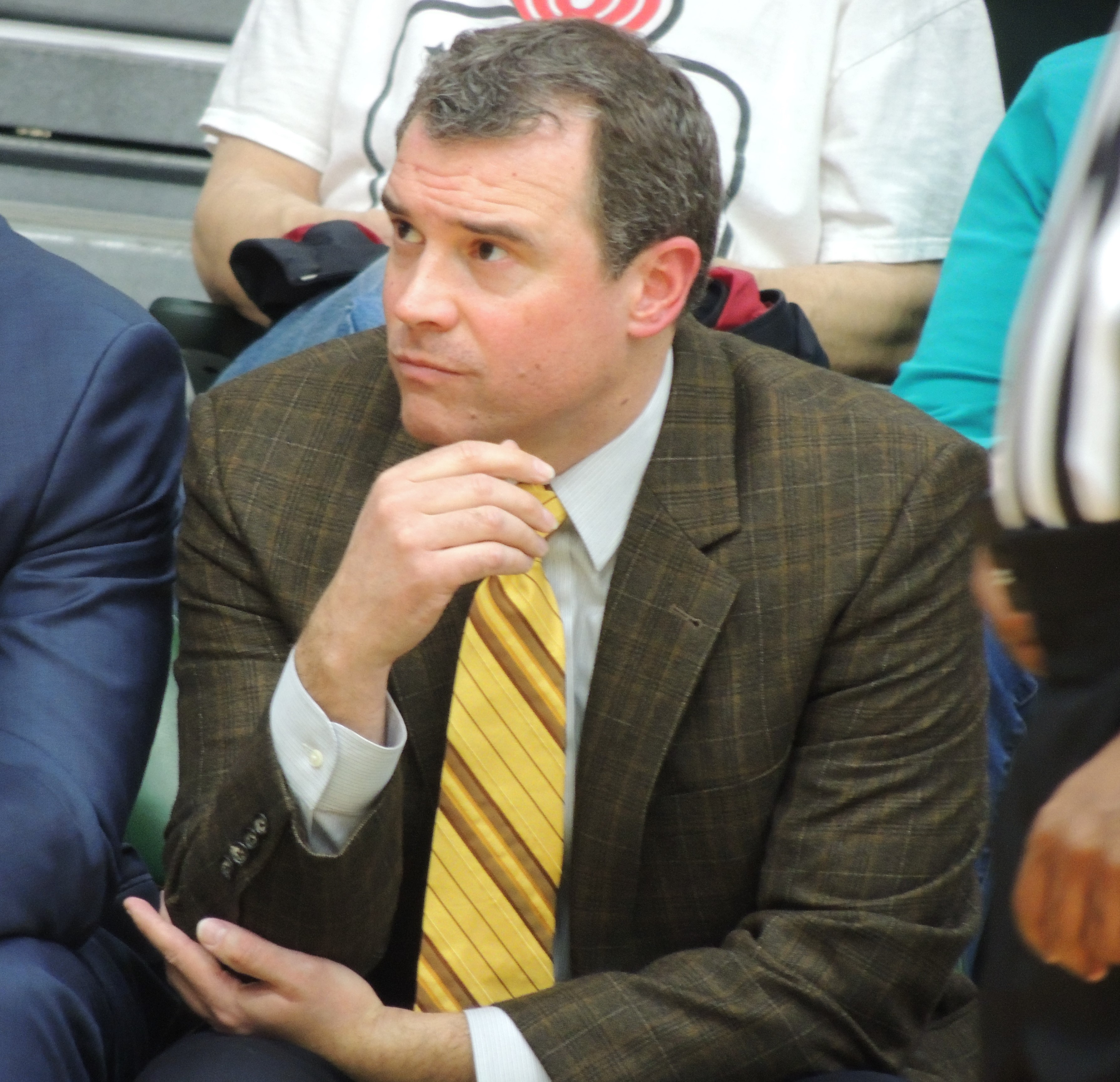
- Reed during Lehigh v. Loyola at Reitz Arena in 2018

Current position
- Title: Head coach
- Team: Lehigh
- Conference: Patriot League
- Record: 309–277 (.527)

Biographical details
- Born: May 29, 1972 (age 54); Waterford, Michigan, U.S.

Playing career
- 1991–1995: Eckerd
- Position: Point guard

Coaching career (HC unless noted)
- 1995–1997: Oakland CC (assistant)
- 1999–2000: UNC Greensboro (assistant)
- 2000–2002: High Point (assistant)
- 2002–2006: Lehigh (assistant)
- 2006–2007: Lehigh (associate HC)
- 2007–present: Lehigh

Head coaching record
- Overall: 309–277 (.527)
- Tournaments: 1–3 (NCAA Division I); 0–1 (CBI)

Accomplishments and honors

Championships
- Patriot League regular season (2010); 3 Patriot League tournament (2010, 2012, 2026)

Brett Reed (born May 29, 1972) is an American college basketball coach and the current head men's basketball coach for the Lehigh University Mountain Hawks. Reed is known most notably for Lehigh's upset over the Duke Blue Devils in the 2012 NCAA Division I men's basketball tournament. Lehigh was a 15 seed and knocked off the highly touted Duke program as a number 2 seed in the tournament.

== Experience ==
Reed began his tenure at Lehigh University as an assistant coach, recruiting coordinator, academic monitor, and scout for five years from 2002 until 2007. He was promoted to head coach on August 10, 2007, succeeding Billy Taylor who had been named to a similar capacity at Ball State University two days prior on August 8. He also served as an assistant coach at High Point, UNC Greensboro and Oakland Community College. His only prior head coaching experience was at Canterbury School in Florida.

== Education ==
Reed received a bachelor's degree in literature from Eckerd College in 1995. He earned both a master's degree in 1998 and a Ph.D. in instructional technology with a cognate in sports administration in 2003 from Wayne State University.

== Head coaching record ==
Record table
Season	Team	Overall	Conference	Standing	Postseason
Lehigh Mountain Hawks (Patriot League) (2007–present)
2007–08	Lehigh	14–15	7–7	4th	
2008–09	Lehigh	15–14	5–9	5th	
2009–10	Lehigh	22–11	10–4	1st	NCAA Division I Round of 64
2010–11	Lehigh	16–15	6–8	4th	
2011–12	Lehigh	27–8	11–3	2nd	NCAA Division I Round of 32
2012–13	Lehigh	21–10	10–4	3rd	CBI First Round
2013–14	Lehigh	14–18	7–11	6th	
2014–15	Lehigh	16–14	10–8	3rd	
2015–16	Lehigh	17–15	13–5	2nd	
2016–17	Lehigh	20–12	12–6	3rd	
2017–18	Lehigh	16–14	11–7	4th	
2018–19	Lehigh	20–11	12–6	3rd	
2019–20	Lehigh	11–21	7–11	8th	
2020–21	Lehigh	4–11	4–10	3rd (Central)	
2021–22	Lehigh	13–19	10–8	4th	
2022–23	Lehigh	16–14	11–7	3rd	
2023–24	Lehigh	14–17	9–9	6th	
2024–25	Lehigh	11–19	6–12	8th	
2025–26	Lehigh	18–17	11–7	T–2nd	NCAA Division I First Four
2026–27	Lehigh	4–2	0–0		
Lehigh:		309–277 (.527)	172–142 (.548)		
Total:		309–277 (.527)			
National champion Postseason invitational champion Conference regular season champion Conference regular season and conference tournament champion Division regular season champion Division regular season and conference tournament champion Conference tournament champion
