= 2003 Southland Conference men's basketball tournament =

American basketball tournament

- Classification: Division I
- Season: 2002–03
- Teams: 6
- First round site: Campus sites
- Semifinals site: Campus sites
- Finals site: Bernard Johnson Coliseum; Huntsville, Texas
- Champions: Sam Houston State (1st title)
- Winning coach: Bob Marlin (1st title)
- MVP: Donald Cole (Sam Houston State)

2002–03 Southland Conference men's basketball standings
| | Conf. | | | | Overall |
| Team | W | | L | PCT | W | | L | PCT |
|---|---|---|---|---|---|---|---|---|
| Sam Houston State † | 17 | – | 3 | .850 | 23 | – | 7 | .767 |
| Stephen F. Austin | 16 | – | 4 | .800 | 21 | – | 8 | .724 |
| Texas–Arlington | 13 | – | 7 | .650 | 16 | – | 13 | .552 |
| Southwest Texas State | 11 | – | 9 | .550 | 17 | – | 12 | .586 |
| McNeese State | 10 | – | 10 | .500 | 15 | – | 14 | .517 |
| Lamar | 10 | – | 10 | .500 | 13 | – | 14 | .481 |
| Louisiana-Monroe | 10 | – | 10 | .500 | 12 | – | 16 | .429 |
| Southeastern Louisiana | 9 | – | 11 | .450 | 11 | – | 16 | .407 |
| UTSA | 7 | – | 13 | .350 | 10 | – | 17 | .370 |
| Northwestern State | 6 | – | 14 | .300 | 6 | – | 21 | .222 |
| Nicholls State | 1 | – | 19 | .050 | 3 | – | 25 | .107 |
† 2003 Southland tournament winner Rankings from AP poll

The 2003 Southland Conference men's basketball tournament took place March 10–14, 2003. The quarterfinal and semifinal rounds were played at the home arena of the higher seeded-teams, with the championship game played at Bernard Johnson Coliseum in Huntsville, Texas.

Top-seeded Sam Houston State won the championship game over second-seeded Stephen F. Austin, and earned the conference's automatic bid to the NCAA tournament. Donald Cole of Sam Houston State was named the tournament's MVP.

== Format ==
The top six eligible men's basketball teams in the Southland Conference received a berth in the conference tournament. After the conference season, teams were seeded by conference record. For the semifinal round, the remaining teams were reseeded.

== Bracket ==
Quarterfinals; March 8
4 | Southwest Texas State | 94
5 | Louisiana–Monroe | 85
3 | Texas–Arlington | 67
6 | McNeese State | 78

Semifinals; March 10
1 | Sam Houston State | 64
6 | McNeese State | 58
2 | Stephen F. Austin | 67
4 | Southwest Texas State | 58

Finals; March 12
1 | Sam Houston State | 69^{OT}
2 | Stephen F. Austin | 66
