= Gulf Star Conference Men's Basketball Player of the Year =

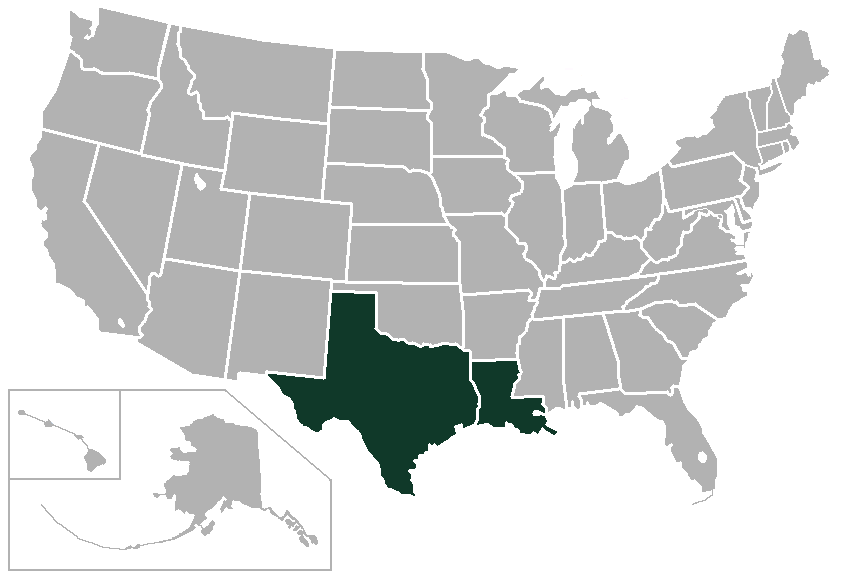
- Awarded for: the most outstanding basketball player in the Gulf Star Conference
- Country: United States

History
- First award: 1985
- Final award: 1987

The Gulf Star Conference Men's Basketball Player of the Year was an annual basketball award given to the Gulf Star Conference's most outstanding player. The award was bestowed just three times (1985–1987) coinciding with the NCAA Division II conference's short existence. The Gulf Star operated from 1984–85 to 1986–87.

During this time, the regular season men's basketball champions were Southeastern Louisiana (1985), Sam Houston State (1986), and Stephen F, Austin (1987). With the exception of Southeastern Louisiana in 1985, the regular season champions also had the Gulf Star Players of the Year on their squads: Lorenzo Duncan (Sam Houston State) in 1986 and Eric Rhodes (Stephen F. Austin) in 1987.

== Winners ==
| Season | Player | School | Position | Class | Reference |
|---|---|---|---|---|---|
| 1984–85 | Bruce Allen | Sam Houston State | F | Junior | |
| 1985–86 | Lorenzo Duncan | Sam Houston State | F | Senior | |
| 1986–87 | Eric Rhodes | Stephen F. Austin | G | Junior | |

== Winners by school ==
| School (year joined) | Winners | Years |
|---|---|---|
| Sam Houston State (1984) | 2 | 1985, 1986 |
| Stephen F. Austin (1984) | 1 | 1987 |
| Nicholls (1984) | 0 | — |
| Northwestern State (1984) | 0 | — |
| Southeastern Louisiana (1984) | 0 | — |
| Texas State (1984) | 0 | — |
