= 2010 Patriot League men's basketball tournament =

- Classification: Division I
- Season: 2009–10
- Teams: 8
- Site: campus sites
- Champions: Lehigh (2nd title)
- Winning coach: Brett Reed (1st title)
- MVP: Zahir Carrington (Lehigh)
- Television: ESPN2 (champ. game)

2009–10 Patriot League men's basketball standings
	Conf.				Overall
Team	W		L	PCT	W		L	PCT
Lehigh†	10	–	4	.714	19	–	10	.655
Bucknell	9	–	5	.643	14	–	16	.467
Lafayette	8	–	6	.571	17	–	12	.586
American	7	–	7	.500	10	–	19	.345
Navy	7	–	7	.500	13	–	16	.448
Colgate	6	–	8	.429	10	–	18	.357
Holy Cross	5	–	9	.357	8	–	21	.276
Army	4	–	10	.286	14	–	14	.500
† 2010 Patriot League tournament winner As of March 1, 2010; Rankings from AP Poll

The 2010 Patriot League men's basketball tournament was held at campus sites for the higher seeds. The quarterfinals were on March 3, the semi-finals on March 7, and the Championship was held on March 12, 2011. The winner of the tournament, Lehigh, received an automatic bid to the 2010 NCAA Men's Division I Basketball Tournament.

== Bracket ==
Quarterfinals; March 3
1	Lehigh	64
8	Army	45
4	American	62
5	Navy	60
3	Lafayette	73
6	Colgate	65
2	Bucknell	64
7	Holy Cross	67

Semifinals; March 7
1	Lehigh	79
4	American	57
3	Lafayette	66
7	Holy Cross	63

Championship; March 12
1	Lehigh	74
3	Lafayette	59
