= 2009–10 Sam Houston State Bearkats men's basketball team =

American college basketball season

2009–10 Sam Houston State Bearkats men's basketball

Southland West Division Champions Southland Tournament Champions

NCAA tournament, Round of 64
- Conference: Southland Conference
- West
- Record: 25–8 (14–2 Southland)
- Head coach: Bob Marlin
- Assistant coaches: Neil Hardin; Jason Hooten; Oderra Jones
- Home arena: Bernard Johnson Coliseum

2009–10 Southland Conference men's basketball standings
	Conf.				Overall
Team	W		L	PCT	W		L	PCT
East
Stephen F. Austin	11	–	5	.688	23	–	9	.719
Southeastern Louisiana	10	–	6	.625	19	–	12	.613
Nicholls State	7	–	9	.438	11	–	19	.367
Northwestern State	5	–	10	.333	10	–	19	.345
McNeese State	5	–	11	.313	10	–	20	.333
Central Arkansas	3	–	13	.188	9	–	21	.300
West
Sam Houston State†	14	–	2	.875	25	–	8	.758
Texas A&M–Corpus Christi	10	–	6	.625	17	–	15	.531
UTSA	9	–	7	.563	19	–	11	.633
Texas State	9	–	7	.563	15	–	16	.484
Texas–Arlington	8	–	8	.500	16	–	14	.533
Lamar	5	–	11	.313	14	–	18	.438
† 2010 Southland tournament winner As of March 18, 2010; Rankings from AP poll

The 2009–10 Sam Houston State Bearkats men's basketball team represented Sam Houston State University in the 2009–10 college basketball season. This was head coach Bob Marlin's twelfth season at Sam Houston State. The Bearkats competed in the Southland Conference and played their home games at Bernard Johnson Coliseum. They finished the season 25–8, 14–2 in Southland play to capture the regular season championship. They also were champions of the 2010 Southland Conference men's basketball tournament to earn the conferences automatic bid to the 2010 NCAA Division I men's basketball tournament. They earned a 14 seed in the South Region and were defeated by 3 seed and AP #19 Baylor in the first round.

== Roster ==
#	Name	Height	Weight (lbs.)	Position	Class	Hometown	Previous Team(s)
1	Ashton Mitchell	5'11"	175	G	Sr.	New Orleans, LA	Westwood HS
4	Kelly Lawson	6'8"	215	F	Fr.	Pearland, TX	Pearland HS
5	Drae Murray	5'10"	135	G	So.	Huntsville, TX	Huntsville HS
10	Corey Allmond	6'1"	180	G	Sr.	Oxon Hill, MD	Brandywine HS; Howard College
11	Josten Crow	6'4"	204	F	Jr.	Houston, TX	Westfield HS
12	Trevon Charles	6'4"	215	F	Jr.	Queens, NY	Rice HS; Western Texas CC
14	Gilberto Clavell	6'6"	210	F	Jr.	Mayagüez, Puerto Rico	Florida Air Academy; Collin County CC
15	Preston Brown	6'6"	225	F	Sr.	Stringtown, OK	Stringtown HS; Cowley County CC
20	Aaron Thompson	6'9"	180	C	Fr.	Burkburnett, TX	Burkburnett HS
21	Lance Pevehouse	6'2"	180	G	Jr.	League City, TX	Clear Creek HS
23	Marco Cooper	6'7"	190	F	Jr.	Freeport, Bahamas	Sagemont School; Delaware
24	Arthur Zulu	6'8"	220	C	Sr.	Lusaka, Zambia	Jacksonville College
25	Antuan Bootle	6'7"	265	C	So.	Houston, TX	St. Thomas HS

== Schedule and results ==
- All times are Central

Date time, TV	Rank^{#}	Opponent^{#}	Result	Record	Site (attendance) city, state
Regular Season
11/14/2009*; 7:00pm		LeTourneau	W 73–42	1–0	Bernard Johnson Coliseum (1,273); Huntsville, TX
11/16/2009*; 7:00pm		Texas College	W 91–54	2–0	Bernard Johnson Coliseum (1,091); Huntsville, TX
11/19/2009*; 6:00pm, SEC Network		at No. 4 Kentucky; Cancún Challenge	L 102–92	2–1	Rupp Arena (22,728); Lexington, KY
11/21/2009*; 6:00pm, Horizon League Network		at Cleveland State; Cancún Challenge	L 80–65	2–2	Wolstein Center (1,542); Cleveland, OH
11/24/2009*; 12:30pm		vs. Oral Roberts; Cancún Challenge	W 71–65	3–2	Moon Palace Resort (350); Cancún, Mexico
11/25/2009*; 3:00pm		vs. Rider; Cancún Challenge	W 80–63	4–2	Moon Palace Resort (235); Cancún, Mexico
11/30/2009*; 7:30pm		Mid-America Christian	W 87–55	5–2	Bernard Johnson Coliseum (993); Huntsville, TX
12/5/2009*; 2:00pm		Louisiana–Lafayette	L 95–85	5–3	Bernard Johnson Coliseum (1,180); Huntsville, TX
12/12/2009*; 2:00pm		Ecclesia	W 69–40	6–3	Bernard Johnson Coliseum (969); Huntsville, TX
12/20/2009*; 1:00pm, SEC Network		at Auburn	W 107–89	7–3	Beard-Eaves-Memorial Coliseum (4,221); Auburn, AL
12/22/2009*; 7:00pm		FIU	W 93–63	8–3	Bernard Johnson Coliseum (1,191); Huntsville, TX
12/28/2009*; 6:00pm		at Wright State	L 88–44	8–4	Nutter Center (4,408); Dayton, OH
1/3/2010*; 1:00pm		at Western Michigan	L 74–73	8–5	Smith Spectrum (2,693); University Arena
1/9/2010; 2:00pm		Stephen F. Austin	W 66–57	9–5 (1–0)	Bernard Johnson Coliseum (1,564); Huntsville, TX
1/16/2010; 3:00pm		at Southeastern Louisiana	W 84–79	10–5 (2–0)	University Center (484); Hammond, LA
1/20/2010; 7:00pm		Texas State	W 95–64	11–5 (3–0)	Bernard Johnson Coliseum (1,787); Huntsville, TX
1/23/2010; 7:00pm		at Texas–Arlington	W 67–64	12–5 (4–0)	Texas Hall (942); Arlington, TX
1/24/2010; 7:00pm		Lamar	W 90–63	13–5 (5–0)	Bernard Johnson Coliseum (1,689); Huntsville, TX
1/30/2010; 7:00pm		at Texas A&M–Corpus Christi	W 70–58	14–5 (6–0)	American Bank Center (2,461); Corpus Christi, TX
2/3/2010; 7:00pm		UTSA	W 73–67	15–5 (7–0)	Bernard Johnson Coliseum (1,772); Huntsville, TX
2/6/2010; 7:00pm		Central Arkansas	W 75–70	16–5 (8–0)	Bernard Johnson Coliseum (1,478); Huntsville, TX
2/10/2010; 6:30pm		at Nicholls State	W 75–69	17–5 (9–0)	Stopher Gym (385); Thibodaux, LA
2/13/2010; 7:00pm		Texas A&M – Corpus Christi	W 90–74	18–5 (10–0)	Bernard Johnson Coliseum (1,599); Huntsville, TX
2/17/2010; 7:00pm		at Lamar	W 66–54	19–5 (11–0)	Montagne Center (3,357); Beaumont, TX
2/20/2010; 7:00pm		at UTSA	L 91–90 ^{OT}	19–6 (11–1)	UTSA Convocation Center (3,675); San Antonio, TX
2/24/2010; 7:00pm		McNeese State	W 74–56	20–6 (12–1)	Bernard Johnson Coliseum (2,018); Huntsville, TX
2/27/2010; 7:00pm		Texas–Arlington	W 94–69	21–6 (13–1)	Bernard Johnson Coliseum (1,477); Huntsville, TX
3/3/2010; 7:00pm		at Northwestern State	W 103–75	22–6 (14–1)	Prather Coliseum (1,224); Natchitoches, LA
3/6/2010; 4:00pm		at Texas State	L 101–97 ^{OT}	22–7 (14–2)	Strahan Coliseum (1,387); San Marcos, TX
2010 Southland Conference men's basketball tournament
3/10/2010; 6:00pm		vs. Nicholls State; Quarterfinals	W 62–57	23–7	Leonard E. Merrell Center (1,437); Katy, TX
3/11/2010; 8:30pm		vs. Southeastern Louisiana; Semifinals	W 88–85	24–7	Leonard E. Merrell Center (1,343); Katy, TX
3/13/2010; 3:00pm, ESPN2		vs. Stephen F. Austin; Final	W 64–48	25–7	Leonard E. Merrell Center (3,573); Katy, TX
2010 NCAA Division I men's basketball tournament
3/18/2010*; 1:45pm, CBS		vs. No. 19 Baylor; First round	L 68–59	25–8	New Orleans Arena (10,484); New Orleans, LA
*Non-conference game. ^{#}Rankings from AP Poll. (#) Tournament seedings in parentheses.
