= Bob Marlin =

American basketball coach (born 1959)

Current position
- Title: Assistant coach
- Team: North Florida
- Conference: Atlantic Sun Conference

Biographical details
- Born: March 5, 1959 (age 67); Tupelo, Mississippi, U.S.
- Education: Mississippi State University (1981)

Coaching career (HC unless noted)
- 1981–1983: Northeast Louisiana (GA)
- 1983–1989: Houston Baptist (assistant)
- 1989–1990: Marshall (assistant)
- 1990–1995: Pensacola JC
- 1995–1998: Alabama (assistant)
- 1998–2010: Sam Houston State
- 2010–2024: Louisiana
- 2025–present: North Florida (assistant)

Head coaching record
- Overall: 494–329 (.600) (Division I); 123–35 (.778) (NJCAA)
- Tournaments: 0–4 (NCAA Division I); 0–1 (NIT); 4–3 (CIT)

Accomplishments and honors

Championships
- NJCAA Division I tournament (1993); 2x Southland tournament (2003, 2010); 3x Southland regular season (2000, 2003, 2010); 2x Sun Belt tournament (2014, 2023); Sun Belt regular season (2018)

Awards
- NJCAA National Coach of the Year (1993); Skip Prosser Man of the Year Award (2010); 3× Southland Coach of the Year (2000, 2003, 2010); Southland Coach of the Decade (2000–10); Sun Belt Coach of the Year (2018)

Robert Lee Marlin (born March 5, 1959) is an American college basketball coach who is currently an assistant coach at the University of North Florida. Previously, he was the head coach at Sam Houston State University and the University of Louisiana.

== Early life and education ==
Born in Tupelo, Mississippi, Marlin graduated from Mississippi State University in 1981 with a B.S. in physical education. Marlin completed a master's degree in health and physical education at Northeast Louisiana University (now the University of Louisiana at Monroe) in 1983.

== Coaching career ==
=== Early assistant positions (1983–1990) ===
While attending graduate school at Northeast Louisiana, Marlin was a graduate assistant for the Northeast Louisiana Indians men's basketball team under Mike Vining from 1981 to 1983, during which Northeast Louisiana made the 1982 NCAA tournament.

After graduate school, Marlin worked in his first full-time coaching job as an assistant at Houston Baptist from 1983 to 1989 under Gene Iba and Tommy Jones. Marlin helped Houston Baptist qualify for the 1984 NCAA tournament.

In the 1989–90 season, Marlin was an assistant at Marshall under Dana Altman on a team that finished second in the Southern Conference.

=== Pensacola Junior College (1990–1995) ===
Marlin's first head coaching position was at Pensacola Junior College (now Pensacola State College) from 1990 to 1995. In five seasons, Marlin led Pensacola to a 123–35 record and the 1993 NJCAA national championship, for which he won NJCAA Coach of the Year honors. Additionally, 27 players who played under Marlin won athletic scholarships from four-year schools.

=== Alabama assistant (1995–1998) ===
Returning to the NCAA Division I level, Marlin was an assistant coach at Alabama from 1995 to 1998 under David Hobbs. During this time, Alabama finished third in the 1996 National Invitation Tournament.

=== Sam Houston State (1998–2010) ===
At Sam Houston State, Marlin was head coach from 1998 to 2010. With a cumulative 225–131 record, Marlin led the Bearkats to three Southland Conference regular season titles (2000, 2003, and 2010) and two Southland Conference tournament titles and NCAA Tournament automatic qualifications (2003 and 2010), including the program's first-ever NCAA Division I Tournament appearance in 2003.

=== Louisiana (2010–2024) ===
The University of Louisiana at Lafayette hired Marlin as head coach for the Louisiana team on March 29, 2010. In 10 seasons, Marlin has a cumulative 188–143 record at Louisiana (Louisiana–Lafayette before 2017), with two Sun Belt Conference regular season titles (2011 and 2018) and the 2014 Sun Belt Conference men's basketball tournament championship with an automatic qualification to the 2014 NCAA tournament. On March 7, 2019, Marlin became the fifth coach in Sun Belt Conference history to earn 100 league victories after Louisiana earned a come-from-behind 77-72 win at Little Rock.

Louisiana appeared in the CollegeInsider.com Postseason Tournament in 2012, 2015, and 2016. In the 2017–18 season, Louisiana reached a school record 27 wins with a first-place finish in the Sun Belt and NIT appearance. Days prior to the NIT first round game against in-state opponent LSU, Marlin questioned why Louisiana had a lower seed than LSU. On March 14, 2018, LSU won the NIT first round game at home 84–76 over Louisiana. Late in the game, Marlin and LSU coach Will Wade were confrontational towards each other, even needing to be restrained.

In December 2024, Louisiana Athletic Director Bryan Maggard fired Marlin, citing concerns about the long-term health of the program. Maggard claimed that Marlin was given the option to continue coaching through the end of the 2024-2025 season, but that he declined to do so.

=== North Florida assistant (2025-present) ===
In August 2025 Marlin was hired as an assistant coach at the University of North Florida.

== Head coaching record ==
=== Junior college ===
Record table
| Season | Team | Overall | Conference | Standing | Postseason |
|---|---|---|---|---|---|
Pensacola Pirates (Panhandle Conference) (1990–1995)
| 1990–91 | Pensacola | 25–6 | | | |
| 1991–92 | Pensacola | 24–7 | | | |
| 1992–93 | Pensacola | 31–5 | | | NJCAA Division I Champion |
| 1993–94 | Pensacola | 21–9 | | | |
| 1994–95 | Pensacola | 22–8 | | | |
| Total: | | 123–35 (.778) | | | |
National champion Postseason invitational champion Conference regular season champion Conference regular season and conference tournament champion Division regular season champion Division regular season and conference tournament champion Conference tournament champion

=== College ===
Record table
| Season | Team | Overall | Conference | Standing | Postseason |
|---|---|---|---|---|---|
Sam Houston State Bearkats (Southland Conference) (1998–2010)
| 1998–99 | Sam Houston State | 10–16 | 7–11 | 9th | |
| 1999–2000 | Sam Houston State | 22–7 | 15–3 | 1st | |
| 2000–01 | Sam Houston State | 16–13 | 11–9 | T–4th | |
| 2001–02 | Sam Houston State | 14–14 | 9–11 | T–7th | |
| 2002–03 | Sam Houston State | 23–7 | 17–3 | 1st | NCAA Division I Round of 64 |
| 2003–04 | Sam Houston State | 13–15 | 8–8 | T–5th | |
| 2004–05 | Sam Houston State | 18–12 | 11–5 | 3rd | |
| 2005–06 | Sam Houston State | 22–9 | 11–5 | 2nd | |
| 2006–07 | Sam Houston State | 21–10 | 13–3 | 2nd (West) | |
| 2007–08 | Sam Houston State | 23–8 | 10–6 | 2nd (West) | |
| 2008–09 | Sam Houston State | 18–12 | 12–4 | 1st (West) | |
| 2009–10 | Sam Houston State | 25–8 | 14–2 | 1st (West) | NCAA Division I Round of 64 |
| Sam Houston State: | | 225–131 (.632) | 138–70 (.663) | | |
Louisiana Ragin' Cajuns (Sun Belt Conference) (2010–2024)
| 2010–11 | Louisiana–Lafayette | 14–15 | 11–5 | T–1st (West) | |
| 2011–12 | Louisiana–Lafayette | 16–16 | 10–6 | 3rd (West) | CIT First Round |
| 2012–13 | Louisiana–Lafayette | 13–20 | 8–12 | 3rd (West) | |
| 2013–14 | Louisiana–Lafayette | 23–12 | 11–7 | 3rd | NCAA Division I Round of 64 |
| 2014–15 | Louisiana–Lafayette | 22–14 | 13–7 | 4th | CIT Quarterfinals |
| 2015–16 | Louisiana–Lafayette | 19–15 | 12–8 | 4th | CIT Quarterfinals |
| 2016–17 | Louisiana–Lafayette | 21–12 | 10–8 | T–6th | |
| 2017–18 | Louisiana | 27–7 | 16–2 | 1st | NIT First Round |
| 2018–19 | Louisiana | 19–13 | 10–8 | 5th | |
| 2019–20 | Louisiana | 14–19 | 8–12 | T–8th | |
| 2020–21 | Louisiana | 17–9 | 10–7 | 2nd (West) | |
| 2021–22 | Louisiana | 16–15 | 8–9 | 8th | |
| 2022–23 | Louisiana | 26–8 | 13–5 | T–2nd | NCAA Division I Round of 64 |
| 2023–24 | Louisiana | 19–14 | 10–8 | 5th | |
| 2024–25 | Louisiana | 3–9 | 1–0 | | |
| Louisiana: | | 269–198 (.576) | 151–103 (.594) | | |
| Total: | | 494–329 (.600) | | | |
National champion Postseason invitational champion Conference regular season champion Conference regular season and conference tournament champion Division regular season champion Division regular season and conference tournament champion Conference tournament champion
