= 2002–03 Sam Houston State Bearkats men's basketball team =

American college basketball season

2002–03 Sam Houston State Bearkats men's basketball

Southland West Division Champions Southland Tournament Champions

NCAA tournament
- Conference: Southland Conference
- West
- Record: 23–7 (17–3 Southland)
- Head coach: Bob Marlin
- Assistant coaches: Neil Hardin; Jason Hooten; Oderra Jones
- Home arena: Bernard Johnson Coliseum

2002–03 Southland Conference men's basketball standings
| | Conf. | | | | Overall |
| Team | W | | L | PCT | W | | L | PCT |
|---|---|---|---|---|---|---|---|---|
| Sam Houston State † | 17 | – | 3 | .850 | 23 | – | 7 | .767 |
| Stephen F. Austin | 16 | – | 4 | .800 | 21 | – | 8 | .724 |
| Texas–Arlington | 13 | – | 7 | .650 | 16 | – | 13 | .552 |
| Southwest Texas State | 11 | – | 9 | .550 | 17 | – | 12 | .586 |
| McNeese State | 10 | – | 10 | .500 | 15 | – | 14 | .517 |
| Lamar | 10 | – | 10 | .500 | 13 | – | 14 | .481 |
| Louisiana-Monroe | 10 | – | 10 | .500 | 12 | – | 16 | .429 |
| Southeastern Louisiana | 9 | – | 11 | .450 | 11 | – | 16 | .407 |
| UTSA | 7 | – | 13 | .350 | 10 | – | 17 | .370 |
| Northwestern State | 6 | – | 14 | .300 | 6 | – | 21 | .222 |
| Nicholls State | 1 | – | 19 | .050 | 3 | – | 25 | .107 |
† 2003 Southland tournament winner Rankings from AP poll

The 2002–03 Sam Houston State Bearkats men's basketball team represented Sam Houston State University in the 2002–03 college basketball season. This was head coach Bob Marlin's fifth season at Sam Houston State. The Bearkats competed in the Southland Conference and played their home games at Bernard Johnson Coliseum. They finished the season 23–7, 17–3 in Southland play to capture the regular season championship. They also were champions of the 2003 Southland Conference men's basketball tournament to earn the conferences automatic bid to the 2003 NCAA Division I men's basketball tournament. They earned a 14 seed in the South Region and were defeated by 3 seed Florida in the first round.

== Roster ==
2002–03 Sam Houston State Bearkats men's basketball team
| Players | Coaches |
|---|---|
| Pos. / # / Name / Height / Weight / Year / Previous school / Hometown; C / / Donald Cole / 6 ft 8 in (2.03 m) / 215 lb (98 kg) / Sr / Lincoln / Port Arthur, Texas | Head coach: Bob Marlin; Assistant coach(es) Legend: (C) Team captain; (S) Suspended; (I) Ineligible; (W) Walk-on; Injured; Current redshirt |

== Schedule and results ==
- All times are Central

| Date time, TV | Rank^{#} | Opponent^{#} | Result | Record | Site (attendance) city, state |
Regular season
| Nov 22, 2002* | | at TCU | L 81–91 | 0–1 | Daniel-Meyer Coliseum (4,616); Fort Worth, Texas |
| Dec 18, 2002* | | at Arkansas | L 67–78 | 2–3 | Bud Walton Arena (9,368); Fayetteville, Arkansas |
Southland regular season
| Dec 28, 2002 | | Lamar | W 61–47 | 4–3 (1–0) | Bernard Johnson Coliseum (1,461); Huntsville, Texas |
| Dec 30, 2002 | | at McNeese State | W 85–78 | 5–3 (2–0) | Burton Coliseum (1,700); Lake Charles, Louisiana |
Southland tournament
| Mar 12, 2003* | | McNeese State; Semifinals | W 64–58 | 22–6 | Bernard Johnson Coliseum (4,128); Huntsville, Texas |
| Mar 14, 2003* | | Stephen F. Austin; Championship game | W 69–66 ^{OT} | 23–6 | Bernard Johnson Coliseum (5,068); Huntsville, Texas |
NCAA tournament
| Mar 21, 2003* | (15 S) | vs. (2 S) No. 10 Florida; First round | L 55–85 | 23–7 | St. Pete Times Forum (20,224); Tampa, Florida |
*Non-conference game. ^{#}Rankings from AP Poll. (#) Tournament seedings in parentheses. S=South.
