= 2009–10 North Texas Mean Green men's basketball team =

American college basketball season

2009–10 North Texas Mean Green men's basketball

Sun Belt tournament champions

NCAA tournament, Round of 64
- Conference: Sun Belt Conference
- West
- Record: 24–9 (13–5 Sun Belt)
- Head coach: Johnny Jones (9th season)
- Home arena: Super Pit

2009–10 Sun Belt Conference men's basketball standings
	Conf.				Overall
Team	W		L	PCT	W		L	PCT
East
Troy	13	–	5	.722	20	–	13	.606
Middle Tennessee	13	–	5	.722	19	–	14	.576
Western Kentucky	12	–	6	.667	21	–	13	.618
Florida Atlantic	10	–	8	.556	14	–	16	.467
South Alabama	8	–	10	.444	17	–	15	.531
FIU	4	–	14	.222	7	–	25	.219
West
North Texas†	13	–	5	.722	24	–	9	.727
Arkansas State	11	–	7	.611	17	–	14	.548
Denver	10	–	8	.556	19	–	13	.594
Louisiana–Lafayette	10	–	8	.556	13	–	17	.433
Louisiana–Monroe	6	–	12	.333	12	–	19	.387
Arkansas–Little Rock	4	–	14	.222	8	–	22	.267
New Orleans	3	–	15	.167	8	–	22	.267
† 2010 Sun Belt Conference tournament winner Rankings from AP Poll

The 2009–10 North Texas Mean Green men's basketball team (often referred to as "North Texas" or the "Mean Green") represented the University of North Texas in the 2009–10 college basketball season. The team was led by head coach Johnny Jones and played their home games on campus at the Super Pit in Denton, Texas. In 2009–10, North Texas set a new school-record with 24 wins, and the Mean Green won the Sun Belt Conference tournament title to advance to the NCAA tournament. As the No. 14 seed in the West region, UNT lost to No. 3 seed Pittsburgh in the Round of 64.

== Roster ==
2009–10 North Texas Mean Green men's basketball team
Players
Coaches

Pos.	#	Name	Height	Weight	Year	Hometown
F	4	George Odufuwa	6 ft 8 in (2.03 m)	240 lb (109 kg)	Jr	Dallas, Texas
G	10	Josh White	5 ft 10 in (1.78 m)	175 lb (79 kg)	Jr	Baton Rouge, Louisiana
G	14	Tristan Thompson	6 ft 5 in (1.96 m)	193 lb (88 kg)	Jr	Angleton, Texas
F	25	Eric Tramiel	6 ft 7 in (2.01 m)	230 lb (104 kg)	Sr	Shreveport, Louisiana
F	30	Jacob Holmen	6 ft 8 in (2.03 m)	225 lb (102 kg)	Fr	Whitehouse, Texas

Head coach

- Johnny Jones

Assistant coach(es)

Legend

- (C) Team captain
- (S) Suspended
- (I) Ineligible
- (W) Walk-on
- Injured
- Current redshirt

== Schedule and results ==
Date time, TV	Rank^{#}	Opponent^{#}	Result	Record	Site (attendance) city, state
Regular season
Nov 13, 2009*		Cameron	W 80–62	1–0	Super Pit; Denton, Texas
Nov 18, 2009*		at Texas–Arlington	W 101–99 ^{2OT}	2–0	Texas Hall; Arlington, Texas
Nov 21, 2009*		at Oklahoma State	L 68–82	2–1	Gallagher-Iba Arena; Stillwater, Oklahoma
Nov 24, 2009*		Jackson State	W 68–58	3–1	Super Pit; Denton, Texas
Nov 28, 2009*		at Boise State	L 73–79	3–2	Taco Bell Arena; Boise, Idaho
Dec 2, 2009*		Southwestern	W 91–62	4–2	Super Pit; Denton, Texas
Dec 5, 2009*		at Rice	W 64–62	5–2	Tudor Fieldhouse; Houston, Texas
Dec 7, 2009*		at Texas A&M	L 65–75	5–3	Reed Arena; College Station, Texas
Dec 13, 2009		Louisiana–Monroe	W 79–62	6–3 (1–0)	Super Pit; Denton, Texas
Dec 20, 2009		Florida International	L 70–80 ^{OT}	6–4 (1–1)	Super Pit; Denton, Texas
Dec 22, 2009*		Southeastern Louisiana	W 71–61	7–4	Super Pit; Denton, Texas
Dec 28, 2009*		Texas Southern	W 71–69	8–4	Super Pit; Denton, Texas
Dec 31, 2009		at Arkansas–Little Rock	W 83–78	9–4 (2–1)	Jack Stephens Center; Little Rock, Arkansas
Jan 2, 2010		at Arkansas State	L 56–71	9–5 (2–2)	Convocation Center; Jonesboro, Arkansas
Jan 7, 2010; 5:05 p.m.		at Louisiana–Lafayette	L 72–74	9–6 (2–3)	Cajundome; Lafayette, Louisiana
Jan 9, 2010		New Orleans	W 71–57	10–6 (3–3)	Super Pit; Denton, Texas
Jan 14, 2010		at Troy	W 75–72	11–6 (4–3)	Trojan Arena; Troy, Alabama
Jan 16, 2010		Arkansas State	L 70–83	11–7 (4–4)	Super Pit; Denton, Texas
Jan 21, 2010		South Alabama	W 86–78	12–7 (5–4)	Super Pit; Denton, Texas
Jan 28, 2010		at Western Kentucky	W 84–83 ^{OT}	13–7 (6–4)	E.A. Diddle Arena; Bowling Green, Kentucky
Jan 30, 2010		at Middle Tennessee	L 64–69	13–8 (6–5)	Murphy Center; Murfreesboro, Tennessee
Feb 4, 2010		Florida Atlantic	W 86–69	14–8 (7–5)	Super Pit; Denton, Texas
Feb 6, 2010		at Florida International	W 68–66	15–8 (8–5)	U.S. Century Bank Arena; Miami, Florida
Feb 11, 2010		at New Orleans	W 68–46	16–8 (9–5)	Lakefront Arena; New Orleans, Louisiana
Feb 13, 2010		Denver	W 64–59	17–8 (10–5)	Super Pit; Denton, Texas
Feb 15, 2010*		at Houston Baptist	W 107–87	18–8	Sharp Gymnasium; Houston, Texas
Feb 20, 2010		Arkansas–Little Rock	W 83–65	19–8 (11–5)	Super Pit; Denton, Texas
Feb 25, 2010; 7:00 p.m.		Louisiana–Lafayette	W 65–57	20–8 (12–5)	Super Pit; Denton, Texas
Feb 27, 2010		at Louisiana–Monroe	W 74–71	21–8 (13–5)	Fant–Ewing Coliseum; Monroe, Louisiana
Sun Belt tournament
Mar 7, 2010*		vs. Louisiana–Monroe; Quarterfinals	W 69–66	22–8	Summit Arena; Hot Springs, Arkansas
Mar 8, 2010*		vs. Denver; Semifinals	W 63–56	23–8	Summit Arena; Hot Springs, Arkansas
Mar 9, 2010*		vs. Troy; Championship Game	W 66–63	24–8	Summit Arena; Hot Springs, Arkansas
NCAA tournament
Mar 18, 2010*; CBS	(15 W)	vs. (2 W) No. 7 Kansas State; Second Round	L 62–82	24–9	Ford Center (13,382); Oklahoma City, Oklahoma
*Non-conference game. ^{#}Rankings from Coaches Poll. (#) Tournament seedings in parentheses. W=West. All times are in Central Time.
