= Lorenzo Duncan =

American basketball player (born 1963)

Personal information
- Born: January 15, 1963 (age 63)
- Listed height: 6 ft 2 in (1.88 m)
- Listed weight: 175 lb (79 kg)

Career information
- High school: Cairo (Cairo, Illinois)
- College: Alabama–Huntsville (1981–1983); Sam Houston State (1984–1986)
- NBA draft: 1986: 6th round, 128th overall pick
- Drafted by: Washington Bullets
- Playing career: 1986–199?
- Position: Point guard

Career history
- 1988–1989: Hemel Hempstead Royals
- 1990–1991: Kingston B.C.

Career highlights
- BBL All-Star (1989); Gulf Star Player of the Year (1986); 2× First-team All-Gulf Star (1985, 1986); Southern States Player of the Year (1983); 2× First-team All-Southern States (1982, 1983); Southern States Tournament MVP (1983)
- Stats at Basketball Reference

Lorenzo Duncan (born January 15, 1963) is an American former professional basketball player who had been named an All-Star in the British Basketball League during the 1988–89 season. In college, he competed for Alabama–Huntsville and Sam Houston State. Duncan was a four-time first-team all-conference selection and won two conference player of the year awards: the 1983 Southern States Conference Player of the Year and the 1986 Gulf Star Conference Player of the Year.

== Early life ==
A native of Cairo, Illinois, Duncan attended Cairo High School where as a senior in 1980–81 he was named all-state. That year he averaged 16 points, 7 rebounds, 6 assists, and 5 steals per game while leading the Cairo High Pilots to a 30–5 record. The team finished in third place in the Illinois Class A state tournament. Duncan was considered a "big-time point guard" who was recruited by NCAA Division I schools such as Oklahoma, Western Kentucky, and Southern Illinois, but due to his grades he was not immediately eligible to compete in the NCAA. Instead, Duncan chose to play for the Alabama–Huntsville Chargers, a school in the NAIA which did not adhere to the same academic requirements for student-athletes as the NCAA.

== College career ==
As a freshman at Alabama–Huntsville in 1981–82, Duncan appeared in 25 games and averaged 12.2 points, 4.2 rebounds, 4.8 assists, and 3.6 steals. He helped guide the Chargers to win the Southern States Conference (SSC) Men's Basketball Tournament and was named to the all-conference first team. The following year, he averaged 15.3 points, 5.3 rebounds, 4.8 assists, and 3.6 steals per game in 36 games played. Alabama–Huntsville repeated as SSC Tournament champions with Duncan being named the tournament's MVP. He repeated as a first-team selection while also taking home the regular season's top honor – Duncan was the 1983 Southern States Conference Player of the Year.

After his sophomore season in 1982–83, a coaching change led to his decision to transfer out of Alabama–Huntsville. He went to Sam Houston State in the Gulf Star Conference, an NCAA Division II conference in its first year of existence. Due to NCAA transfer rules, Duncan had to redshirt (sit out) his 1983–84 season.

As a junior in 1984–85, he averaged 12.3 points, 3.7 rebounds, 5.1 assists, and 3.0 steals per game in 28 appearances. Although the Bearkats mustered only a 16–12 overall record, Duncan was selected to the All-Gulf Star first team. The following season, Duncan's senior year, Sam Houston State went 9–1 in conference play (27–6 overall), were Gulf Star regular season champions, and earned a berth into the 1986 NCAA Division II tournament. He averaged 17.4 points, 3.8 rebounds, 3.7 assists, and 2.7 steals per game in 33 appearances en route to a second consecutive (and fourth overall) first-team all-conference selection. Duncan was also named the Gulf Star Player of the Year, marking the second time he was named a league's MVP.

== Professional career ==
Duncan was selected in the sixth round of the 1986 NBA draft by the Washington Bullets (128th overall). He never played in the NBA, however.

He played in the British Basketball League from 1986 to 1992. In 1988–89 he played for the Hemel Hempstead Royals (as of 2021–22 known as the London Lions) where he was a BBL All-Star.
