= 2009–10 Sun Belt Conference men's basketball season =

- League: NCAA Division I
- Sport: Basketball
- Duration: November 9, 2009 through March 6, 2010
- Teams: 13
- TV partner(s): ESPN, CBS Sports

Regular Season

Tournament

Basketball seasons
- ← 2008–09 2010–11 →

2009–10 Sun Belt Conference men's basketball standings
	Conf.				Overall
Team	W		L	PCT	W		L	PCT
East
Troy	13	–	5	.722	20	–	13	.606
Middle Tennessee	13	–	5	.722	19	–	14	.576
Western Kentucky	12	–	6	.667	21	–	13	.618
Florida Atlantic	10	–	8	.556	14	–	16	.467
South Alabama	8	–	10	.444	17	–	15	.531
FIU	4	–	14	.222	7	–	25	.219
West
North Texas†	13	–	5	.722	24	–	9	.727
Arkansas State	11	–	7	.611	17	–	14	.548
Denver	10	–	8	.556	19	–	13	.594
Louisiana–Lafayette	10	–	8	.556	13	–	17	.433
Louisiana–Monroe	6	–	12	.333	12	–	19	.387
Arkansas–Little Rock	4	–	14	.222	8	–	22	.267
New Orleans	3	–	15	.167	8	–	22	.267
† 2010 Sun Belt Conference tournament winner Rankings from AP Poll

The 2009–10 Sun Belt Conference men's basketball season marked the 33rd season of Sun Belt Conference men's basketball during the 2009–10 NCAA Division I men's basketball season.

== Preseason ==
Blue Ribbon magazine predicted Western Kentucky University to win the East Division. The Hilltoppers are returning from a season in which they came within one second of upsetting Gonzaga and advancing to the NCAA Sweet Sixteen. In addition, Hilltopper star A.J. Slaughter was named the Preseason Player of the Year.

=== Sun Belt Preseason Poll ===
East Division

Rank	Team
1	Western Kentucky
2	Troy
3	Middle Tennessee State
4	South Alabama
5	Florida Atlantic
6	Florida International

West Division

Rank	Team
1	North Texas
2	UALR
3	Louisiana-Lafayette
4	Denver
5	Arkansas State
6	ULM
7	New Orleans

=== Preseason All-SBC Team ===
- G -- Brandon Hazzard (Troy, Sr.)
- G -- A. J. Slaughter (WKU, Sr.)
- F -- Nate Rohnert (Denver, Sr.)
- F -- Eric Tramiel (North Texas, Sr.)
- F -- Desmond Yates (Middle Tennessee, Sr.)

== Regular season ==
=== Non-conference ===
In terms of upsets over the six major conferences, Western Kentucky beat Vanderbilt University 76-69 on December 11. A.J. Slaughter scored 27 points to lead the Hilltoppers to their first win over Vanderbilt since 1946. Western Kentucky led for the final 16:33 of the game, though Vanderbilt cut the lead to one twice. This was Vanderbilt's second consecutive loss.

== Postseason ==
=== SBC Tournament ===
First round Saturday, March 6
8	FAU	51
9	South Alabama	52
4	Western Kentucky	83
13	New Orleans	58
5	Arkansas State	89*
12	Ark-Little Rock	82
6	Denver	71
11	FIU	64
7	UL Lafayette	75
10	UL Monroe	76

Second round Sunday, March 7
1	Troy	67
9	South Alabama	55
4	Western Kentucky	65
5	Arkansas State	64
3	Middle Tennessee	58
6	Denver	73
2	North Texas	69
10	UL Monroe	66

Semifinals; Monday, March 8
1	Troy	54
4	Western Kentucky	48
6	Denver	56
2	North Texas	63

Championship game Tuesday, March 9
1	Troy	63
2	North Texas	66

Asterisk denotes game ended in overtime.
