= 2010 Sun Belt Conference men's basketball tournament =

- Tournament Logo
- Classification: Division I
- Season: 2009–10
- Teams: 13
- Site: Summit Arena; Convention Center Court; Hot Springs, Arkansas
- Champions: North Texas (2nd title)
- Winning coach: Johnny Jones (2nd title)
- MVP: Eric Tramiel (North Texas)
- Television: ESPN Regional Television, ESPN2

2009–10 Sun Belt Conference men's basketball standings
	Conf.				Overall
Team	W		L	PCT	W		L	PCT
East
Troy	13	–	5	.722	20	–	13	.606
Middle Tennessee	13	–	5	.722	19	–	14	.576
Western Kentucky	12	–	6	.667	21	–	13	.618
Florida Atlantic	10	–	8	.556	14	–	16	.467
South Alabama	8	–	10	.444	17	–	15	.531
FIU	4	–	14	.222	7	–	25	.219
West
North Texas†	13	–	5	.722	24	–	9	.727
Arkansas State	11	–	7	.611	17	–	14	.548
Denver	10	–	8	.556	19	–	13	.594
Louisiana–Lafayette	10	–	8	.556	13	–	17	.433
Louisiana–Monroe	6	–	12	.333	12	–	19	.387
Arkansas–Little Rock	4	–	14	.222	8	–	22	.267
New Orleans	3	–	15	.167	8	–	22	.267
† 2010 Sun Belt Conference tournament winner Rankings from AP Poll

The 2010 Sun Belt Conference men's basketball tournament was held in Hot Springs, Arkansas from March 18 to March 29. Eight Games including the Semi-finals and final were played at Summit Arena and four other games were played at Convention Center Court in Hot Springs, Arkansas. All 13 Sun Belt teams participated in the tournament and there seedings are based on their conference record. North Texas was the tournament champion and received an automatic bid to the 2010 NCAA Men's Division I Basketball Tournament.

== Bracket ==
First round Saturday, March 6
8	FAU	51
9	South Alabama	52
4	Western Kentucky	83
13	New Orleans	58
5	Arkansas State	89*
12	Ark-Little Rock	82
6	Denver	71
11	FIU	64
7	UL Lafayette	75
10	UL Monroe	76

Second round Sunday, March 7
1	Troy	67
9	South Alabama	55
4	Western Kentucky	65
5	Arkansas State	64
3	Middle Tennessee	58
6	Denver	73
2	North Texas	69
10	UL Monroe	66

Semifinals; Monday, March 8
1	Troy	54
4	Western Kentucky	48
6	Denver	56
2	North Texas	63

Championship game Tuesday, March 9
1	Troy	63
2	North Texas	66

Asterisk denotes game ended in overtime.
