= Zahir Carrington =

American basketball player

Personal information
- Born: March 12, 1988 (age 38) Philadelphia, Pennsylvania
- Listed height: 6 ft 7 in (2.01 m)
- Listed weight: 210 lb (95 kg)

Career information
- High school: Masterman (Philadelphia, Pennsylvania)
- College: Lehigh (2006–2010)
- NBA draft: 2010: undrafted
- Position: Small forward

Career highlights
- 2× Second-team All-Patriot League (2009, 2010); Patriot League tournament MVP (2010); Patriot League All-Rookie Team (2007)

Zahir Carrington (born March 12, 1988) is an American basketball player who most recently played as a member of Princeton 3X3 and Chicago 3x3 in the FIBA 3X3 World Tour.

== High school ==
Carrington was a first-team All-Public League, third-team All-City, first-team All-Daily News, and Labor Union All-Star selection in his senior season after averaging 19 points, 11 rebounds, and two blocks per game.

== College career ==
As a freshman with Lehigh, Carrington averaged 5.4 points and 3.4 rebounds per game and was named a Patriot League All-Rookie team selection. His junior year, he averaged 14 points and 8.6 rebounds per game, led the Patriot League in rebounds, recorded 10 double-doubles was named Second-Team All-Patriot League selection and Second-Team All-District selection. Carrington earned All Patriot League honors in 2008, 2009, and 2010. He was team captain his junior and senior seasons, including for the 2010 Patriot League Championship Team, and was named the 2010 Patriot League Tournament Most Valuable Player.

=== Career statistics ===
Season	GP	MPG	FG%	FT%	REB	AST	BLK	STL	PF	TO	PTS
2006–07	30	17.1	46.8	73.8	3.4	0.4	0.6	0.6	2.4	1.2	5.4
2007–08	29	25	53.1	68.5	4.1	0.9	1	0.6	3.4	2.4	12.5
2008–09	29	30.4	44	65.4	8.6	1	0.7	0.8	3.2	2.7	14
2009–10	30	28	51.6	49.6	6.7	1.3	1.4	1.1	3.3	2.7	11

== Professional career ==
Carrington averaged 21 points, 11 rebounds, and 2.5 blocks per game for the ABA's New Jersey Express in 2010–11. Carrington also played as a member of Princeton 3x3 and part of the team's 2017 U.S. National Championship squad who participated in the FIBA 3x3 2017 World Cup.
