= 2010 NCAA Division I men's basketball tournament =

Edition of USA college basketball tournament

- Teams: 65
- Finals site: Lucas Oil Stadium, Indianapolis, Indiana
- Champions: Duke Blue Devils (4th title, 10th title game, 15th Final Four)
- Runner-up: Butler Bulldogs (1st title game, 1st Final Four)
- Semifinalists: West Virginia Mountaineers (2nd Final Four); Michigan State Spartans (8th Final Four)
- Winning coach: Mike Krzyzewski (4th title)
- MOP: Kyle Singler (Duke)

The 2010 NCAA Division I men's basketball tournament involved 65 teams playing in a single-elimination tournament that determined the National Collegiate Athletic Association (NCAA) Division I men's basketball national champion for the 2009–10 basketball season. The 72nd annual edition of the tournament began on March 16, 2010, and concluded with the championship game on April 5, at Lucas Oil Stadium in Indianapolis, Indiana.

The Final Four consisted of Duke, making their first appearance since 2004, West Virginia, who were making their second appearance and first since 1959, Butler, considered the host school and making their first ever appearance, and Michigan State, the national runner-up from 2009 appearing in the Final Four for the sixth time under head coach Tom Izzo.

When Duke and Butler played each other in the tournament final, it was the first title game between private universities in 25 years (Villanova and Georgetown met in 1985), and the fifth such match-up in history (1942, 1954, and 1955 having been the other years). Duke defeated Butler 61–59 in the championship game as Gordon Hayward's last second desperation shot clanged off the rim. It was Duke's first national championship since 2001 and fourth overall.

Entering the tournament, the top four seeds were Kansas, Duke, Kentucky, and Syracuse. Kansas entered the Tournament as the overall No. 1 seed but was defeated in the opening weekend by Northern Iowa, the No. 9 seed in the Midwest region. Northern Iowa was one of four teams seeded lower than No. 8 to advance to the Sweet Sixteen, joining the East Region's No. 11 seed Washington, No. 12 seed Cornell and the South Region's No. 10 seed Saint Mary's.

For the first time since 2006, a No. 14 seed advanced out of the first round as Ohio defeated Georgetown. The No. 13 seed in the West Region, Murray State, defeated No. 4-seeded Vanderbilt, marking the second consecutive appearance for the Commodores where they lost as a No. 4 seed. Murray State very nearly upset Butler in their next game, losing by two points.

One of the more exciting games of the tournament was played at the West Regional in Salt Lake City, as No. 6 Xavier took No. 2 Kansas State to two overtimes before falling 101–96. Jordan Crawford hit a three-pointer with seconds remaining in the first overtime period to force a second.

== Tournament procedure ==
A total of 65 teams were selected for the tournament. Thirty one of the teams earned automatic bids by winning their conference tournaments. The automatic bid of the Ivy League, which at the time did not conduct a postseason tournament, went to Cornell, its regular season champion. The remaining 34 teams were granted at-large bids, which were extended by the NCAA Selection Committee.

Two teams played an opening-round game, popularly called the play-in game; the winner of that game advanced to the main draw of the tournament and played a top seed in one of the regionals. The 2010 game was played on March 16 at University of Dayton Arena in Dayton, Ohio, as it has been since its inception in 2001.

All 64 teams were seeded 1 to 16 within their regions; the winner of the play-in game automatically received a 16 seed. The Selection Committee seeded the entire field from 1 to 65. UCLA athletic director Dan Guerrero took over as chair of the Division I Men's Basketball Committee.

Defending champion North Carolina did not qualify for the Tournament, while two schools made their first post-season appearance: Southern Conference champion Wofford and SWAC champion Arkansas-Pine Bluff. Conference USA champion Houston made its first NCAA Tournament appearance in 18 years.

== Schedule and venues ==
2010 opening round game (blue) and first and second rounds (green: March 18 & 20, orange: March 19 & 21)
2010 Regionals (blue) and Final Four (red)

The following are the sites that were selected to host each round of the 2010 tournament:

Opening round

- March 16
  - University of Dayton Arena, Dayton, Ohio (host: University of Dayton)

First and second rounds

- March 18 and 20
  - Dunkin' Donuts Center, Providence, Rhode Island (host: Providence College)
  - New Orleans Arena, New Orleans, Louisiana (host: Tulane University)
  - Ford Center, Oklahoma City, Oklahoma (host: Big 12 Conference)
  - HP Pavilion at San Jose, San Jose, California (host: San José State University)
- March 19 and 21
  - HSBC Arena, Buffalo, New York (hosts: Canisius College, Niagara University, Metro Atlantic Athletic Conference)
  - Jacksonville Veterans Memorial Arena, Jacksonville, Florida (host: Jacksonville University)
  - Bradley Center, Milwaukee, Wisconsin (host: Marquette University)
  - Spokane Veterans Memorial Arena, Spokane, Washington (host: Washington State University)

Regional semifinals and finals (Sweet Sixteen and Elite Eight)

- March 25 and 27
  - East Regional, Carrier Dome, Syracuse, New York (hosts: Syracuse University, Big East Conference)
  - West Regional, EnergySolutions Arena, Salt Lake City, Utah (host: University of Utah)
- March 26 and 28
  - Midwest Regional, Edward Jones Dome, St. Louis, Missouri (host: Missouri Valley Conference)
  - South Regional, Reliant Stadium, Houston, Texas (hosts: University of Houston, Rice University)

National semifinals and championship (Final Four and championship)

- April 3 and 5
  - Lucas Oil Stadium, Indianapolis, Indiana (hosts: Butler University, Horizon League)

Indianapolis hosted the Final Four for the 6th time, having previously hosted in 2006, and was also the first to be held at the stadium; the RCA Dome and Market Square Arena hosted past Final Fours when the event was held in Indianapolis.

== Qualifying teams ==

=== Automatic bids ===
The following teams were automatic qualifiers for the 2010 NCAA field by virtue of winning their conference's tournament (except for the Ivy League, whose regular-season champion received the automatic bid).

Conference	School	Appearance	Last bid
ACC	Duke	34th	2009
America East	Vermont	4th	2005
Atlantic 10	Temple	28th	2009
Atlantic Sun	East Tennessee State	9th	2009
Big 12	Kansas	39th	2009
Big East	West Virginia	23rd	2009
Big Sky	Montana	8th	2006
Big South	Winthrop	9th	2008
Big Ten	Ohio State	26th	2009
Big West	UC Santa Barbara	4th	2002
Colonial	Old Dominion	10th	2007
C-USA	Houston	19th	1992
Horizon	Butler	10th	2009
Ivy League	Cornell	5th	2009
MAAC	Siena	6th	2009
MAC	Ohio	13th	2005
MEAC	Morgan State	2nd	2009
Missouri Valley	Northern Iowa	6th	2009
Mountain West	San Diego State	6th	2006
Northeast	Robert Morris	7th	2009
Ohio Valley	Murray State	14th	2006
Pac-10	Washington	15th	2009
Patriot	Lehigh	4th	2004
SEC	Kentucky	50th	2008
Southern	Wofford	1st	Never
Southland	Sam Houston State	2nd	2003
Summit	Oakland	2nd	2005
Sun Belt	North Texas	3rd	2007
SWAC	Arkansas–Pine Bluff	1st	Never
WAC	New Mexico State	18th	2007
West Coast	Saint Mary's	6th	2008

=== Listed by region and seeding ===
East Regional – Syracuse
Seed	School	Conference	Record	Berth type
1	Kentucky	SEC	32–2	Automatic
2	West Virginia	Big East	27–6	Automatic
3	New Mexico	Mountain West	29–4	At-large
4	Wisconsin	Big Ten	23–8	At-large
5	Temple	Atlantic 10	29–5	Automatic
6	Marquette	Big East	22–11	At-large
7	Clemson	ACC	21–10	At-large
8	Texas	Big 12	24–9	At-large
9	Wake Forest	ACC	19–10	At-large
10	Missouri	Big 12	22–10	At-large
11	Washington	Pac-10	24–9	Automatic
12	Cornell	Ivy League	27–4	Automatic
13	Wofford	Southern	26–8	Automatic
14	Montana	Big Sky	22–9	Automatic
15	Morgan State	MEAC	27–9	Automatic
16	East Tennessee State	Atlantic Sun	20–14	Automatic

South Regional – Houston
Seed	School	Conference	Record	Berth type
1	Duke	ACC	29–5	Automatic
2	Villanova	Big East	24–7	At-large
3	Baylor	Big 12	25–7	At-large
4	Purdue	Big Ten	27–5	At-large
5	Texas A&M	Big 12	23–9	At-large
6	Notre Dame	Big East	23–11	At-large
7	Richmond	Atlantic 10	26–8	At-large
8	California	Pac-10	23–10	At-large
9	Louisville	Big East	20–12	At-large
10	Saint Mary's	West Coast	26–5	Automatic
11	Old Dominion	CAA	26–8	Automatic
12	Utah State	WAC	27–7	At-large
13	Siena	MAAC	27–6	Automatic
14	Sam Houston State	Southland	25–7	Automatic
15	Robert Morris	Northeast	23–11	Automatic
16	Arkansas–Pine Bluff	SWAC	17–15	Automatic
16	Winthrop	Big South	19–13	Automatic

Midwest Regional – St. Louis
Seed	School	Conference	Record	Berth type
1	Kansas	Big 12	32–2	Automatic
2	Ohio State	Big Ten	27–7	Automatic
3	Georgetown	Big East	23–10	At-large
4	Maryland	ACC	23–8	At-large
5	Michigan State	Big Ten	24–8	At-large
6	Tennessee	SEC	25–8	At-large
7	Oklahoma State	Big 12	22–10	At-large
8	UNLV	Mountain West	25–8	At-large
9	Northern Iowa	Missouri Valley	28–4	Automatic
10	Georgia Tech	ACC	22–12	At-large
11	San Diego State	Mountain West	25–8	Automatic
12	New Mexico State	WAC	22–11	Automatic
13	Houston	C-USA	19–15	Automatic
14	Ohio	Mid-American	21–14	Automatic
15	UC Santa Barbara	Big West	20–9	Automatic
16	Lehigh	Patriot	22–10	Automatic

West Regional – Salt Lake City
Seed	School	Conference	Record	Berth type
1	Syracuse	Big East	28–4	At-large
2	Kansas State	Big 12	26–7	At-large
3	Pittsburgh	Big East	24–8	At-large
4	Vanderbilt	SEC	24–8	At-large
5	Butler	Horizon	28–4	Automatic
6	Xavier	Atlantic 10	24–8	At-large
7	BYU	Mountain West	29–5	At-large
8	Gonzaga	West Coast	26–6	At-large
9	Florida State	ACC	22–9	At-large
10	Florida	SEC	21–12	At-large
11	Minnesota	Big Ten	21–13	At-large
12	UTEP	C-USA	26–6	At-large
13	Murray State	Ohio Valley	30–4	Automatic
14	Oakland	Summit	26–8	Automatic
15	North Texas	Sun Belt	24–8	Automatic
16	Vermont	America East	25–9	Automatic

== Bracket ==
Results to date

All times in U.S. EDT.

=== Opening Round Game – Dayton, Ohio ===
Winner advanced as 16th seed in South Regional vs. (1) Duke.

Opening Round Game; March 16
16a	Arkansas-Pine Bluff	61
16b	Winthrop	44

=== Midwest Regional – St. Louis, Missouri ===
First round March 18–19
1	Kansas	90
16	Lehigh	74
Oklahoma City - Thu/Sat
8	UNLV	66
9	Northern Iowa	69
5	Michigan State	70
12	New Mexico State	67
Spokane - Fri/Sun
4	Maryland	89
13	Houston	77
6	Tennessee	62
11	San Diego State	59
Providence - Thu/Sat
3	Georgetown	83
14	Ohio	97
7	Oklahoma State	59
10	Georgia Tech	64
Milwaukee - Fri/Sun
2	Ohio State	68
15	UC Santa Barbara	51

Second round March 20–21
1	Kansas	67
9	Northern Iowa	69
5	Michigan State	85
4	Maryland	83
6	Tennessee	83
14	Ohio	68
10	Georgia Tech	66
2	Ohio State	75

Regional semifinals March 26
9	Northern Iowa	52
5	Michigan State	59
6	Tennessee	76
2	Ohio State	73

Regional finals March 28
5	Michigan State	70
6	Tennessee	69

=== West Regional – Salt Lake City, Utah ===
First round March 18–19
1	Syracuse	79
16	Vermont	56
Buffalo - Fri/Sun
8	Gonzaga	67
9	Florida State	60
5	Butler	77
12	UTEP	59
San Jose - Thu/Sat
4	Vanderbilt	65
13	Murray State	66
6	Xavier	65
11	Minnesota	54
Milwaukee - Fri/Sun
3	Pittsburgh	89
14	Oakland	66
7	BYU	99^{2OT}
10	Florida	92
Oklahoma City - Thu/Sat
2	Kansas State	82
15	North Texas	62

Second round March 20–21
1	Syracuse	87
8	Gonzaga	65
5	Butler	54
13	Murray State	52
6	Xavier	71
3	Pittsburgh	68
7	BYU	72
2	Kansas State	84

Regional semifinals March 25
1	Syracuse	59
5	Butler	63
6	Xavier	96
2	Kansas State	101^{2OT}

Regional finals March 27
5	Butler	63
2	Kansas State	56

=== East Regional – Syracuse, New York ===
First round March 18–19
1	Kentucky	100
16	East Tennessee State	71
New Orleans - Thu/Sat
8	Texas	80
9	Wake Forest	81^{OT}
5	Temple	65
12	Cornell	78
Jacksonville - Fri/Sun
4	Wisconsin	53
13	Wofford	49
6	Marquette	78
11	Washington	80
San Jose - Thu/Sat
3	New Mexico	62
14	Montana	57
7	Clemson	78
10	Missouri	86
Buffalo - Fri/Sun
2	West Virginia	77
15	Morgan State	50

Second round March 20–21
1	Kentucky	90
9	Wake Forest	60
12	Cornell	87
4	Wisconsin	69
11	Washington	82
3	New Mexico	64
10	Missouri	59
2	West Virginia	68

Regional semifinals March 25
1	Kentucky	62
12	Cornell	45
11	Washington	56
2	West Virginia	69

Regional finals March 27
1	Kentucky	66
2	West Virginia	73

=== South Regional – Houston, Texas ===
First round March 18–19
1	Duke	73
16	Arkansas-Pine Bluff	44
Jacksonville - Fri/Sun
8	California	77
9	Louisville	62
5	Texas A&M	69
12	Utah State	53
Spokane - Fri/Sun
4	Purdue	72
13	Siena	64
6	Notre Dame	50
11	Old Dominion	51
New Orleans - Thu/Sat
3	Baylor	68
14	Sam Houston State	59
7	Richmond	71
10	Saint Mary's	80
Providence - Thu/Sat
2	Villanova	73^{OT}
15	Robert Morris	70

Second round March 20–21
1	Duke	68
8	California	53
5	Texas A&M	61
4	Purdue	63^{OT}
11	Old Dominion	68
3	Baylor	76
10	Saint Mary's	75
2	Villanova	68

Regional semifinals March 26
1	Duke	70
4	Purdue	57
3	Baylor	72
10	Saint Mary's	49

Regional finals March 28
1	Duke	78
3	Baylor	71

=== Final Four - Lucas Oil Stadium, Indianapolis, Indiana ===
National semifinals April 3
M5	Michigan State	50
W5	Butler	52
E2	West Virginia	57
S1	Duke	78

National Championship Game; April 5
W5	Butler	59
S1	Duke	61

== Game summaries ==
=== Midwest Region ===
==== First round ====
The biggest upset of the first day came in Providence, Rhode Island, where 14th-seeded Ohio defeated third-seeded Georgetown in convincing fashion, 97–83, for their first Tournament win since 1983, when they ousted Illinois State in the first round of that Tournament. Armon Bassett scored 32 points for the Bobcats, who shot 57 percent from the field and made 13 of 23 3-pointers. They advanced to face Tennessee, the sixth seed in the region. The Volunteers held off 11th seed San Diego State, 62–59, on head coach Bruce Pearl's 50th birthday. J. P. Prince and Melvin Goins scored 15 points each for Tennessee.

In Oklahoma City, Ali Farokhmanesh drilled a three-pointer with 4.9 seconds remaining to lift ninth-seeded Northern Iowa over UNLV. It was the Panthers first Tournament win since 1990. UNI advanced to face top-seeded Kansas. The top seed withheld an effort by Lehigh, trailing the 16th seed early in the game and leading by just six at halftime before pulling away midway in the second half for a 90–74 win.

On the second day of play, 10th-seeded Georgia Tech failed to make a single field goal in the final 8:19 of play, but sank 13 free throws to hold off No. 7 Oklahoma State, 64–59, in Milwaukee. Gani Lawal led Georgia Tech with 14 points. The Yellow Jackets advanced to play Ohio State, who defeated UC Santa Barbara 68–51. Buckeye star Evan Turner struggled from the field, shooting 2–13 and scoring nine points, and the Gauchos put up a fight, playing from behind most of the game.

Rounding out the Midwest bracket were Maryland and Michigan State in Spokane, Washington. The Terrapins beat Houston 89–77 behind a career-high 21 points and 17 rebounds from freshman Jordan Williams, while the Spartans edged New Mexico State, 70–67. The end of the game included a controversial lane violation call on Aggies player Troy Gillenwater with 18.6 seconds left that allowed MSU to reshoot a missed free throw and extend its lead to 3.

==== Second round ====
Northern Iowa stunned the nation by knocking off top overall seed Kansas, 69–67. Leading by just one in the final minute of play, Ali Farokhmanesh clinched the victory for the second time in as many games with a three-point basket that ESPN's Pat Forde called "the greatest early-round shot in NCAA tournament history." The win was significant for several reasons: it marked the Panthers' first trip ever to the Sweet Sixteen, and was the first time in six years a No. 1 seed was eliminated in the round of 32. It was also the first time since 1962 that a team from the Missouri Valley Conference had defeated a top seed in the Tournament. Meanwhile, Michigan State lost guard Kalin Lucas to a leg injury late in the first half of its game with Maryland. Michigan State extended its halftime lead of NINE to 16 in the second half before falling behind by one late after succumbing to Maryland's relentless pressure defense and some spectacular plays by Greivis Vásquez. But Korie Lucious kept MSU from losing the game, hitting a 3-pointer as time ran out to lift his team past the Terrapins, 85–83. Lucas' injury proved to be a torn Achilles tendon, putting the junior out of action for up to six months.

For the third time in four years, Tennessee made it to the regional semifinals with their 83–68 win over Ohio. J. P. Prince scored 18 points for the Volunteers, while Scotty Hopson added 17. In Milwaukee, Ohio State's Evan Turner bounced back from his off-night in the first round, nearly recording a triple-double (24 points, 9 rebounds and 9 assists) as the Buckeyes downed Georgia Tech 75–66.

==== Regional semifinals (Sweet Sixteen) ====
CBS

March 26
7:07 pm

Recap

(6) Tennessee Volunteers 76, (2) Ohio State Buckeyes 73
Scoring by half: 39–42, 37–31
Pts: W. Chism 22; Rebs: B. Williams 12; Asts: J. P. Prince 6	Pts: E. Turner 31; Rebs: E. Turner 7 Asts: D. Lighty, E. Turner 5

Edward Jones Dome
Attendance: 26,377
Referees: Mike Kitts, Bryan Kersey, Don Daily

CBS

March 26
9:43 pm

Recap

(9) Northern Iowa Panthers 52, (5) Michigan State Spartans 59
Scoring by half: 29–22, 23–37
Pts: A. Koch 13; Rebs: K. Ahelegbe, J. Eglseder 4 Asts: K. Ahelegbe 2	Pts: D. Summers 19; Rebs: D. Summers 7 Asts: D. Green, K. Lucious 4

Edward Jones Dome
Attendance: 26,377
Referees: Jeff Clark, Paul Janssen, Pat Adams

==== Regional final (Elite Eight) ====
CBS

March 28
2:20 pm

Recap

(6) Tennessee Volunteers 69, (5) Michigan State Spartans 70
Scoring by half: 41–39, 28–31
Pts: W. Chism 13; Rebs: B. Williams 9 Asts: J. P. Prince 5	Pts: D. Summers 21; Rebs: R. Morgan 10; Asts: K. Lucious 4

Edward Jones Dome
Attendance: 25,242
Referees: John Cahill, Pat Driscoll, Michael Stephens

Michigan State's Durrell Summers, after scoring 80 points on 54 field goal attempts, was named the region's Most Outstanding Player.

=== West Region ===
==== First round ====
For the second time in three years, the Vanderbilt Commodores were victims of the upset, losing to Murray State on a Danero Thomas shot with time expiring, 66–65, in San Jose, California. Like 2008, when they lost to Siena, Vandy was seeded fourth against the Racers. Murray State advanced to face fifth-seeded Butler, who defeated UTEP, 77–59, after trailing 33–27 at the half. Shelvin Mack led the Bulldogs with 25 points.

Meanwhile, the Florida Gators rallied from a 13-point deficit in Oklahoma City to send their game with BYU to two overtimes. But Florida player Chandler Parsons missed chances to win the game at the end of regulation and the first overtime, and BYU's Jimmer Fredette sealed the 99–92 win with a pair of threes in the second overtime. Fredette finished with 37 points, the eighth time that year he'd scored over 30. BYU advanced to play Kansas State, who had little trouble with the North Texas Mean Green, winning 82–62.

Five years after Vermont upset Syracuse, the two teams met again in the Big Dance, this time in Buffalo, New York. Unlike the 2005 game, however, Syracuse was able to shut down the Catamounts, winning 79–56. Five players scored in double digits for the Orange. They advanced to play Gonzaga. The Bulldogs had an 18-point led against Florida State, but the Seminoles cut it to five with 2:21 remaining. The Zags survived FSU's comeback, however, by making 8 of 10 free throws down the stretch to seal a 67–60 win.

The last two slots in the West went to Pittsburgh and Xavier. It was a close game between Pittsburgh and Oakland in Milwaukee until Grizzlies forward Derick Nelson received an elbow from Gary McGhee of the Panthers, opening a cut over his left eye that began spurting blood. Immediately after Nelson's departure, Pitt went on a 19–2 run. The Panthers held Oakland to 33 percent in their 89–66 victory. As for Xavier, they beat Minnesota, 65–54. Jordan Crawford, the Xavier player who made national headlines the previous summer when he dunked on LeBron James during a training camp held by the Cleveland Cavaliers superstar, scored 28 points for the Musketeers, 17 of those came in the second half.

==== Second round ====
Murray State had another chance at an upset against Butler, but a 3-point play by Bulldog Ronald Nored dashed those hopes, along with Gordon Hayward deflecting a Racers pass. Butler won 54–52. The Bulldogs' next opponent, top-seeded Syracuse, rolled over Gonzaga, 87–65, with Wes Johnson scoring a career best 31 points and pulling 14 rebounds.

2 seed Kansas State fell behind to BYU early, trailing 10–0 to start the game. But the Wildcats would pull ahead with 4:21 to go in the first half and never relinquished the lead after that, advancing to the next round with an 84–72 win. K-State's Jacob Pullen had a career-high 34 points. And third-seeded Pitt was eliminated by Xavier, 71–68. Jordan Crawford had 27 points for the Musketeers.

==== Regional semifinals (Sweet Sixteen) ====
CBS

March 25
7:07 pm

Recap

(5) Butler Bulldogs 63, (1) Syracuse Orange 59
Scoring by half: 35–25, 28–34
Pts: G. Hayward 17; Rebs: M. Howard 7 Asts: S. Mack 5	Pts: W. Johnson 17; Rebs: R. Jackson, W. Johnson 9 Asts: S. Jardine 5

EnergySolutions Arena
Attendance: 17,254
Referees: Mark Whitehead, Randall McCall, Antinio Petty

CBS

March 25
9:37 pm

Recap

(6) Xavier Musketeers 96, (2) Kansas State Wildcats 101 (2OT)
Scoring by half: 32–31, 40–41 Overtime: 15–15, 9–14
Pts: J. Crawford 32; Rebs: J. Love 15; Asts: T. Holloway 6	Pts: J. Pullen 28; Rebs: C. Kelly 8 Asts: D. Clemente 5

EnergySolutions Arena
Attendance: 17,254
Referees: Mike Reed, Karl Hess, Tony Greene

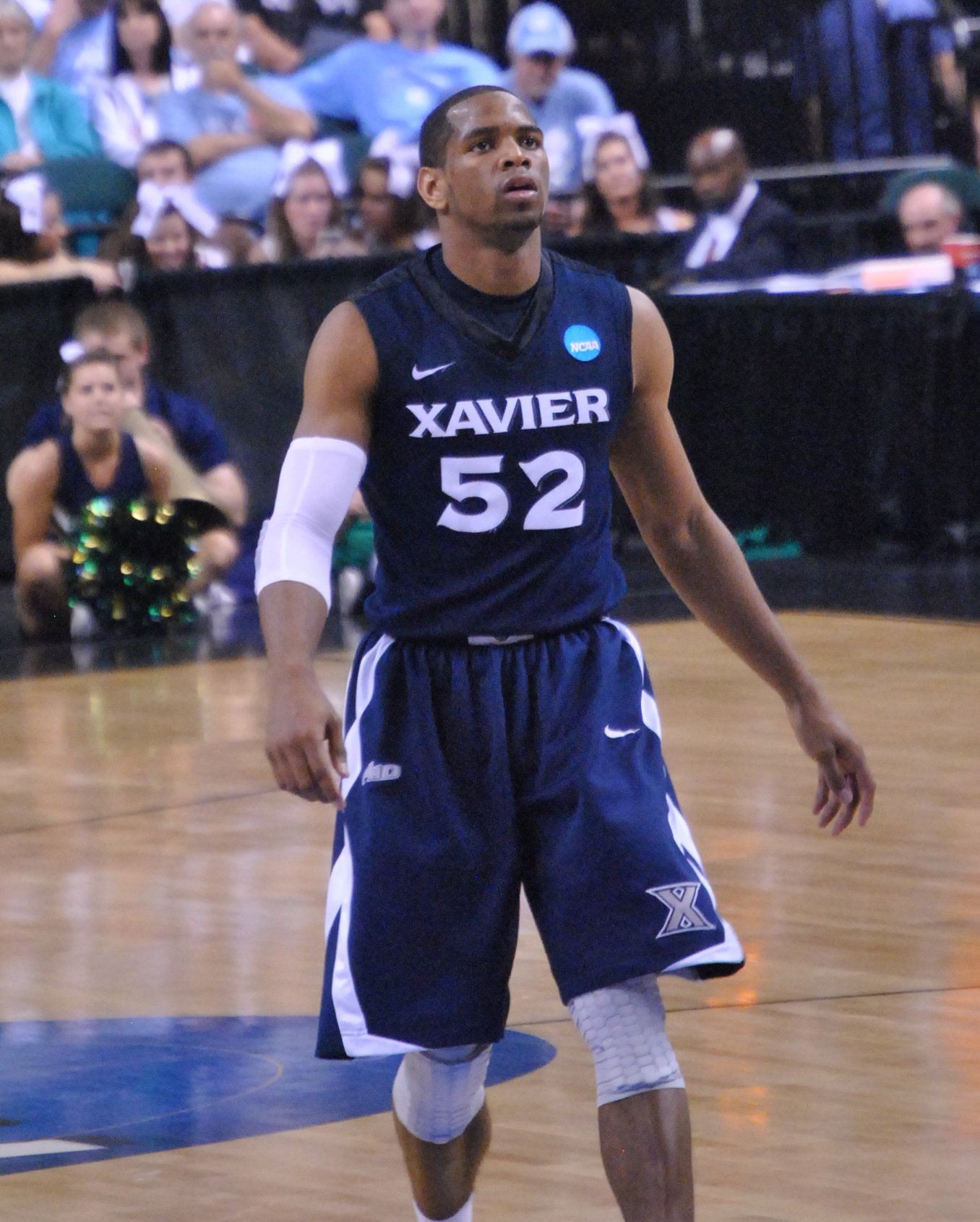
Tu Holloway

In what Gregg Doyel of CBSSports.com called "one of the best games in the history of the Sweet 16", Kansas State downed Xavier, 101–96, in double overtime in Salt Lake City. The Musketeers' Terrell Holloway made three free throws with 5 seconds remaining in regulation to pull Xavier even with the Wildcats. Down 3 again with the first overtime winding down, Jordan Crawford nailed a 35-foot shot to extend the game further. Jacob Pullen then hit a pair of threes in the second overtime to push K-State over the top.

Syracuse became the second number-one seed to fall, as Butler claimed its first-ever trip to the Elite Eight. The 63–59 win brought the Bulldogs within one win of playing the Final Four in their home city. Trailing by four with 5:23 left, Butler held the Orange scoreless for nearly five minutes, while scoring 11 points of their own, including a 3-point shot by Willie Veasley that bounced high off the rim before hitting the backboard and eventually falling through the net. The win marked Butler's 23rd in a row.

==== Regional final (Elite Eight) ====
CBS

March 27
4:30 pm

Recap

(5) Butler Bulldogs 63, (2) Kansas State Wildcats 56
Scoring by half: 27–20, 36–36
Pts: G. Hayward 22; Rebs: G. Hayward, S. Mack 8 Asts: R. Nored 5	Pts: D. Clemente 18; Rebs: D. Sutton 7 Asts: C. Kelly, M. Irving 2

EnergySolutions Arena
Attendance: 17,587
Referees: Verne Harris, Dick Cartmell, Jim Burr

The West All-Regional team was made of regional MVP Gordon Hayward and Shelvin Mack of Butler, Denis Clemente and Jacob Pullen of Kansas State, and Jordan Crawford of Xavier.

=== East Region ===
==== First round ====
In New Orleans, Ishmael Smith scored a 17-foot jumper with 1.3 seconds left in overtime as Wake Forest defeated Texas, 81–80. The Longhorns, who had been ranked number one as recently as January, but fell to an 8 seed in the tournament, twice trailed by double digits before rallying, then held an eight-point lead before falling. Wake Forest advanced to face top-seeded Kentucky, who breezed past East Tennessee State, 100–71.

A basket by Quincy Pondexter with 1.7 seconds remaining helped the Washington Huskies past Marquette, 80–78, in San Jose. Washington had trailed by 15 with over 13 minutes to go in the second half. The Huskies advanced to face New Mexico, who beat the Montana Grizzlies, 62–57. Roman Martinez scored 19 points for the Lobos, while Darington Hobson had 11 points, 11 rebounds and six assists despite playing with a sprained left wrist.

Ivy League champion Cornell joined the parade of double-digit seeds advancing to the second round with a dominating performance over Temple, 78–65, in Jacksonville, Florida. Louis Dale, Ryan Wittman and Jeff Foote, all seniors for the Big Red, scored 21, 20 and 16 points respectively, and Cornell shot 56 percent from the field overall, making 8 of their first 10 shots and shooting 68 percent in the first half. It was the first tournament win in Big Red history. The Wisconsin Badgers, who Cornell drew next, managed to avoid getting upset itself, beating Wofford in a low-scoring affair, 53–49. A pair of free throws from Jon Leuer with 4.2 seconds on the clock sealed the win for Badgers. Leuer had 20 points on the day.

One year after reaching the Elite Eight, 10th-seeded Missouri knocked off No. 7 Clemson, 86–78, in Buffalo. The Missouri Tigers' defense forced 20 turnovers and stole the ball 15 times in the win, while Kim English and Keith Ramsey had 20 points each offensively. Mizzou advanced to play West Virginia, who started its opening round game trailing Morgan State, 12–3. But the 2 seed hit 8 of its next 11 shots to take the lead for good en route to a 77–50 win.

==== Second round ====
Washington looked nothing like the No. 11 seed in the East, dismantling third-seeded New Mexico, 82–64. With 18 points from Quincy Pondexter and 15 from Isaiah Thomas and Matthew Bryan-Amaning each, the Huskies played their uptempo style to a 12-point lead at halftime that grew to 23 midway through the second half. Washington made the Sweet 16 for the third time since 2005. West Virginia reached the Sweet 16 after beating Missouri, 68–59. Da'Sean Butler had 28 points for the Mountaineers, while the Tigers were plagued by poor shooting from the field and at the line.

It was another blowout for the Kentucky Wildcats as they beat Wake Forest, 90–60. Four players scored in double figures for UK as they built an early cushion, then padded it to 31 points by the second half. The Wildcats became the next hurdle in Cornell's Cinderella season, which continued with an 87–69 pasting of No. 4 Wisconsin. Thanks to 26 points from Louis Dale, another 24 from Ryan Wittman, and a 61 percent shooting effort overall—the highest percentage ever allowed by the Badgers in Bo Ryan's nine-year tenure in Madison—the Big Red became the first team from the Ivy League to reach the round of 16 in more than 30 years.

==== Regional semifinals (Sweet Sixteen) ====
CBS

March 25
7:27 pm

Recap

(11) Washington Huskies 56, (2) West Virginia Mountaineers 69
Scoring by half: 29–27, 27–42
Pts: J. Holiday 14; Rebs: M. Bryan-Amaning, J. Holiday 8 Asts: I. Thomas 4	Pts: K. Jones 18; Rebs: K. Jones 8 Asts: D. Ebanks 5

Carrier Dome
Attendance: 22,271
Referees: Tom Eades, Mike Eades, Brian Dorsey

CBS

March 25
10:06 pm

Recap

(12) Cornell Big Red 45, (1) Kentucky Wildcats 62
Scoring by half: 16–32, 29–30
Pts: L. Dale 17; Rebs: J. Foote 6 Asts: 3 players with 2	Pts: D. Cousins 16; Rebs: P. Patterson 12; Asts: J. Wall 8

Carrier Dome
Attendance: 22,271
Referees: Mike Sanzere, James Breeding, John Higgins

The clock struck midnight for 12 seed Cornell and 11 seed Washington. Kentucky put an end to the Big Red's Cinderella run with a 62–45 win in Syracuse, New York. The game started promising for Cornell, as they took a 10–2 lead to the delight of the partisan-Big Red crowd. But a talented Wildcats squad spoiled the party after that with 16 points from DeMarcus Cousins, 12 rebounds from Patrick Patterson and 8 assists from John Wall. West Virginia's 69–56 defeat of the Huskies set up the only 1 vs. 2 regional final in the tournament. The Mountaineers' Da'Sean Butler led all scorers with 18 points, as West Virginia recorded its 30th win, the most in school history.

==== Regional final (Elite Eight) ====
CBS

March 27
7:05 pm

Recap

(2) West Virginia Mountaineers 73, (1) Kentucky Wildcats 66
Scoring by half: 28–26, 45–40
Pts: D. Butler 18; Rebs: K. Jones 8 Asts: J. Flowers, W. Smith 4	Pts: J. Wall 19; Rebs: P. Patterson 13; Asts: J. Wall 5

Carrier Dome
Attendance: 22,497
Referees: Jamie Luckie, Ted Valentine, Curtis Shaw

=== South Region ===
==== First round ====
Second-seeded Villanova survived a scare in Providence, needing overtime to beat Robert Morris, 73–70. Scottie Reynolds was kept from the starting lineup for undisclosed reasons (Coach Jay Wright said he wanted to make a "teaching point"), and even though he scored 20 points, he only made 2 of 15 shots from the field. Mezie Nwigwe had a chance to send the game to a second overtime for the Colonials, but missed a 3-pointer as time ran out. Villanova played Saint Mary's of California in the second round. The Gaels beat Richmond, 80–71, advancing for the first time in over 50 years.

Contributing to the Big East Conference's woes on day one of the tournament was Notre Dame's 51–50 loss to Old Dominion in New Orleans. The Fighting Irish opened the second half with a 30–22 lead before the Monarchs went on a 9–0 run to take the lead. The game remained close until the end, when Notre Dame's Carleton Scott attempted a 3-point basket that ended up rattling around the rim before falling out. A putback from Luke Harangody at the buzzer was not enough for the Irish. Old Dominion advanced to face Baylor in the round of 32. In a close game with Sam Houston State, the Bears used an 8–0 run in the final minutes to take the 68–59 victory.

Arkansas-Pine Bluff won the play-in game on March 16, 2010, by beating Winthrop, 61–44. But they proved to be no match for the No. 1-seed Duke Blue Devils, who blew the Golden Lions out, 73–44, in Jacksonville. Kyle Singler had 22 points and 10 rebounds for Duke, who led 39–20 at the break. Duke advanced to face California in the second round. The Golden Bears rode a rollercoaster with Louisville, leading the Cardinals by 18 before having their lead cut to 6, then pulling back out to a 14-point advantage before Louisville brought it back to within 4. But Cal ended the game with a 15–4 run to win, 77–62.

Finally, in Spokane, the fourth-seeded Purdue Boilermakers had a go of it with upset specialist Siena, trailing the Saints 32–29 at halftime before racing to a 14-point lead to open the second half. Siena would pull within 3 with just over a minute remaining, but Purdue held on for the 72–64 win, spoiling the predictions of some fans and even President Barack Obama that Siena would make the Boilers their latest victim. They advanced to play Texas A&M, who defeated Utah State, 69–53, behind 19 points from freshman Khris Middleton.

==== Second round ====
After barely beating Robert Morris in the first round, Villanova could not withstand the Gael storm from St. Mary's. Omar Samhan scored 32 points and grabbed seven rebounds as the No. 10 seed took down Nova, 75–68. Afterwards, Samhan called the game his "best win ever." Wildcat Scottie Reynolds remained in his funk to end the season, netting just 8 points. Trailing by as many as 14 in the first half and 38–28 at halftime, Old Dominion went on a 9–0 run against Baylor at the start of the second half, then took the lead, 49–47, on free throws from Kent Bazemore. But Baylor would close the door on the upset bid with an 8–1 run to end the game, winning 76–68. The Bears' LaceDarius Dunn led all scorers with 26 points, while 7-foot center Josh Lomers had eight rebounds to go with his career high 14 points.

Chris Kramer's layup with 4.2 seconds left in overtime gave Purdue a 63–61 win over Texas A&M. Kramer finished with 17 points as the Boilermakers came back from a 7-point deficit at halftime. They advanced to face Duke in the Sweet 16. The Blue Devils beat California, 68–53, behind 20 points from Nolan Smith, 17 points from Kyle Singler and 14 points and 13 rebounds from Brian Zoubek. This was the 19th time under head coach Mike Krzyzewski Duke reached the round of 16.

==== Regional semifinals (Sweet Sixteen) ====
CBS

March 26
7:27 pm

Recap

(10) Saint Mary's Gaels 49, (3) Baylor Bears 72
Scoring by half: 17–46, 32–26
Pts: B. Allen 16; Rebs: O. Samhan 9 Asts: M. Dellavedova 7	Pts: L. Dunn 23; Rebs: E. Udoh 11; Asts: 3 players with 3

Reliant Stadium
Attendance: 45,505
Referees: Leslie Jones, Mike Wood, Roger Ayers

CBS

March 26
9:53 pm

Recap

(4) Purdue Boilermakers 57, (1) Duke Blue Devils 70
Scoring by half: 23–24, 34–46
Pts: J. Johnson 23; Rebs: J. Johnson 5 Asts: L. Jackson, K. Grant 4	Pts: K. Singler 24; Rebs: B. Zoubek 14; Asts: J. Scheyer, N. Smith 4

Reliant Stadium
Attendance: 45,505
Referees: Doug Shows, Ed Corbett, Joe Lindsay

==== Regional final (Elite Eight) ====
CBS

March 28
5:05 pm ET

Recap

(3) Baylor Bears 71, (1) Duke Blue Devils 78
Scoring by half: 35–32, 36–46
Pts: L. Dunn 22; Rebs: E. Udoh 10; Asts: E. Udoh 6	Pts: N. Smith 29; Rebs: B. Zoubek, L. Thomas 9 Asts: K. Singler, J. Scheyer 4

Reliant Stadium
Attendance: 47,492
Referees: Scott Thornley, Mike Stuart, Doug Sirmons

Duke defeated Baylor 78–71, in front of a practically home crowd for Baylor in Houston, Texas. Nolan Smith was named game MVP with 29 points, while Lance Thomas also had a career high 8 offensive rebounds.

=== Final four ===
CBS

April 3
6:07 pm

Recap

(W5) Butler Bulldogs 52, (M5) Michigan State Spartans 50
Scoring by half: 28–28, 24–22
Pts: G. Hayward 19; Rebs: G. Hayward 9 Asts: R. Nored and S. Vanzant 2	Pts: D. Summers 14; Rebs: D. Summers 10; Asts: K. Lucious 4

Lucas Oil Stadium
Attendance: 71,298
Referees: Leslie Jones, Jamie Luckie, Mike Stuart

CBS

April 3
9:14 pm

Recap

(E2) West Virginia Mountaineers 57, (S1) Duke Blue Devils 78
Scoring by half: 31–39, 26–39
Pts: W. Smith 12; Rebs: W. Smith, K. Jones 5 Asts: W. Smith 4	Pts: J. Scheyer 23; Rebs: B. Zoubek 10; Asts: J. Scheyer, N. Smith 6

Lucas Oil Stadium
Attendance: 71,298
Referees: Randall McCall, Curtis Shaw, John Higgins

On April 3, 2010, Butler Bulldogs, playing in their hometown, faced off against the Michigan State Spartans. In a tough, physical game, the Bulldogs, despite going more than 11 minutes without a field goal, were able to hang on after forcing Michigan State into 16 turnovers and holding the Spartans to zero fast-break points. The Bulldogs also out-rebounded Michigan State on the offensive glass, 11 to 8. With the victory, Butler became the fourth team in NCAA tournament history to hold its first five opponents under 60 points.

On April 3, 2010, Duke, the #1 seed from the South and West Virginia Mountaineers, the #2 seed from the East, squared off in the second of the Final Four games. Duke showed its full potential in the game, hitting 52.7 percent of its shots (and 52 percent of its three-pointers) while shredding West Virginia's 1-3-1 zone trap. Duke led 39–31 at the half and maintained its red-hot shooting in the second half. The highlight of the game came when Nolan Smith missed a contested, fast-break layup, but Kyle Singler and Miles Plumlee combined to slam home the rebound to give Duke a 14-point lead. Plumlee was credited with the dunk. Kyle Singler scored 21 points for the Blue Devils and Nolan Smith added 19 points and six assists. With the victory, Duke advanced to its 10th NCAA Championship game.

=== National championship ===
CBS

April 5
9:21 pm

Box score

(W5) Butler Bulldogs 59, (S1) Duke Blue Devils 61
Scoring by half: 32–33, 27–28
Pts: G. Hayward, S. Mack 12; Rebs: G. Hayward 8 Asts: W. Veasley 3	Pts: K. Singler 19; Rebs: B. Zoubek 10; Asts: J. Scheyer 5

Lucas Oil Stadium
Attendance: 70,930
Referees: John Cahill, Tom Eades, Ted Valentine

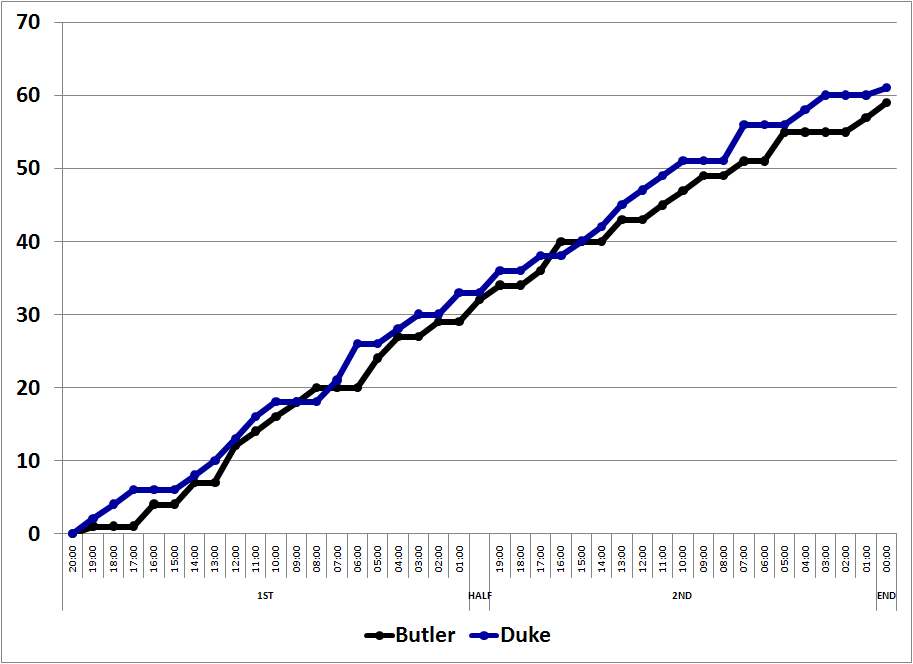
Running score of the championship game

On April 5, 2010, Butler and Duke faced off in what The New York Times called "the most eagerly awaited championship game in years". Butler became the first team to play in the championship game in its home city since UCLA in 1968.

Duke jumped out to a quick 6–1 lead to start the game, but Butler rallied back, taking a 12–11 lead at the 12:28 mark of the first half. At the under eight-minute TV timeout, Butler held a 20–18 lead. After the timeout, Duke went on an 8–0 run to take a 26–20 lead. Butler coach Brad Stevens then called a timeout. With starters Matt Howard and Ronald Nored on the bench in foul trouble, backup center Avery Jukes came up big for Butler. Jukes hit two three-pointers and a made tip-in en route to 10 first half points, tying his single-game season high. At half time, Duke's lead stood at 33–32.

The second half was played very closely, with neither team taking a lead larger than two points until a Brian Zoubek layup put Duke up 47–43 with 12:27 remaining. Butler stayed close, keeping within 5 points the rest of the way. With 3:16 to play, Duke took a 60–55 lead on two made free throws by Nolan Smith. Butler missed its next shot, but forced a missed shot and turned Duke over after an offensive rebound. Matt Howard made a layup for Butler to make it a 60–57 game with 1:44 remaining. Smith missed a layup for Duke and Howard got another layup after collecting an offensive rebound on a missed three-pointer by Shelvin Mack. Duke coach Mike Krzyzewski then called a time out. Kyle Singler missed an open jump shot with 36 seconds remaining, giving Butler a chance to take the lead. Butler was unable to initiate their offense and Stevens called a timeout to set up a play. They were then forced to call their last timeout when they were unable to get the ball in-bounds. Gordon Hayward then missed a short fade-away jumper. Zoubek came down with the rebound, forcing Butler to foul with 3.6 seconds remaining. Zoubek made the first foul shot and then intentionally missed the second, knowing Butler had no timeouts remaining. Hayward was forced to throw up a desperation shot from half court. The ball bounced off the backboard and then the rim. According to analysis by ESPN, Hayward's aim was off by three inches, or less than one degree, on the x-axis. Because a made three-point shot would have resulted in a loss for Duke, some pundits criticized Krzyzewski for his decision to have Zoubek miss the second free throw intentionally. Other pundits, however, ran various analyses that indicated that it was statistically the correct call.

The 61–59 victory earned Krzyzewski his fourth national championship crown, his second in ten years. The game was the most watched finale in more than 10 years, pulling in average of 23.9 million viewers in the United States. Kyle Singler earned Most Outstanding Player honors with 19 points and eight rebounds.

== Upsets ==
Per the NCAA, "Upsets are defined as when the winner of the game was seeded five or more places lower than the team it defeated."

The 2010 tournament saw a total of 8 upsets, with five in the first round and three in the second round.

Upsets in the 2010 NCAA Division I men's basketball tournament
Round	Midwest	West	East	South
Round of 64	No. 14 Ohio defeated No. 3 Georgetown, 97–83	No. 13 Murray State defeated No. 4 Vanderbilt, 66–65	No. 12 Cornell defeated No. 5 Temple, 78–65; No. 11 Washington defeated No. 6 Marquette, 80–78	No. 11 Old Dominion defeated No. 6 Notre Dame, 51–50
Round of 32	No. 9 Northern Iowa defeated No. 1 Kansas, 69–67	None	No. 11 Washington defeated No. 3 New Mexico, 82–64	No. 10 Saint Mary's defeated No. 2 Villanova, 75–68
Sweet 16	None			
Elite 8	None			
Final 4	None			
National Championship	None			

== Record by conference ==
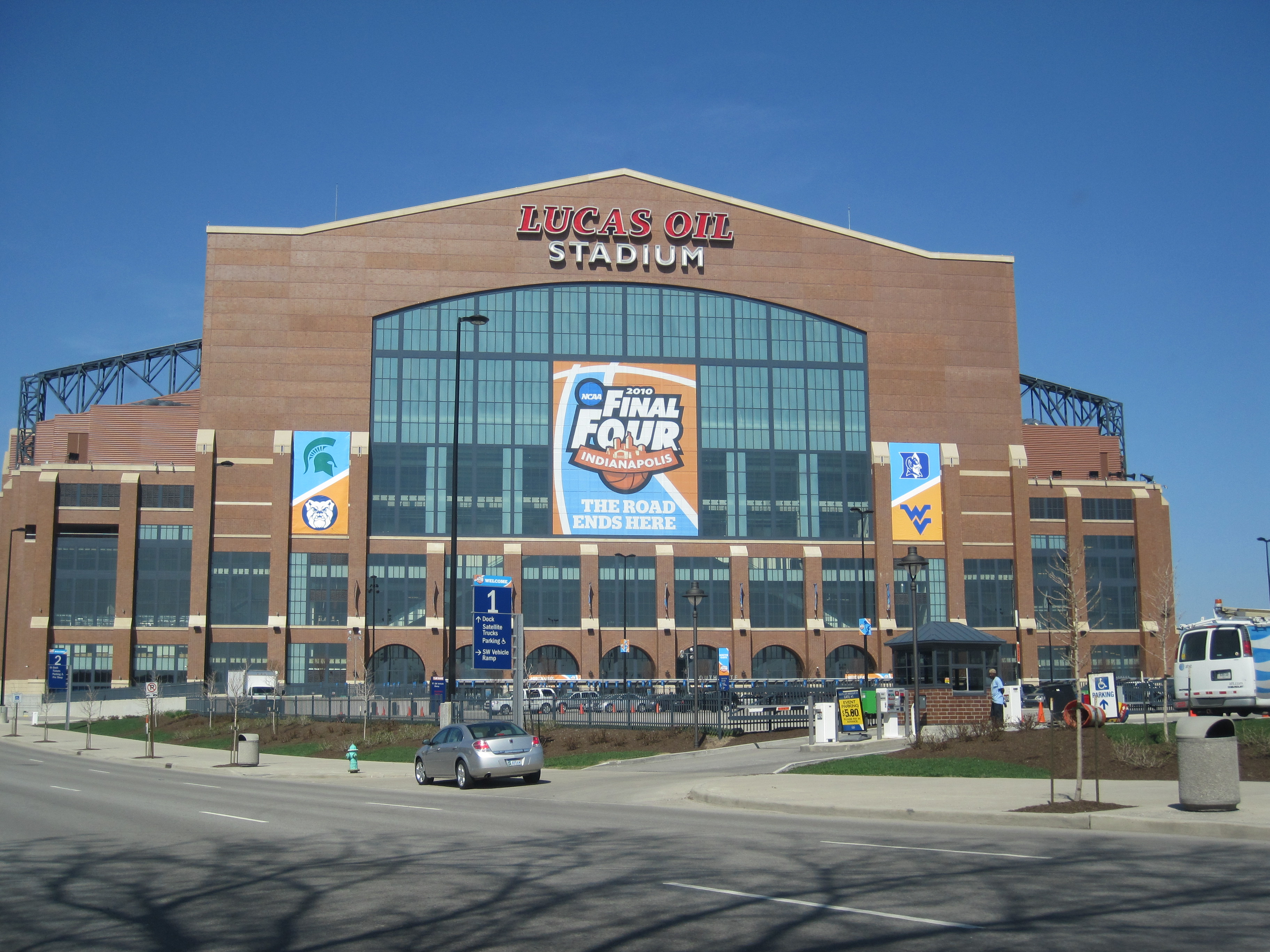
Lucas Oil Stadium during Final Four weekend

Conference	# of Bids	Record	Win %	R32	S16	E8	F4	CG
Big East	8	8–8	.500	4	2	1	1	–
Big 12	7	9–7	.563	5	2	2	–	–
ACC	6	9–5	.643	4	1	1	1	1
Big Ten	5	9–5	.643	4	3	1	1	–
Mountain West	4	2–4	.333	2	–	–	–	–
SEC	4	6–4	.600	2	2	2	–	–
Atlantic 10	3	2–3	.400	1	1	–	–	–
C–USA	2	0–2	.000	–	–	–	–	–
Pac-10	2	3–2	.600	2	1	–	–	–
WAC	2	0–2	.000	–	–	–	–	–
WCC	2	3–2	.600	2	1	–	–	–
Colonial	1	1–1	.500	1	–	–	–	–
Horizon	1	5–1	.833	1	1	1	1	1
Ivy	1	2–1	.667	1	1	–	–	–
MAC	1	1–1	.500	1	–	–	–	–
MVC	1	2–1	.667	1	1	–	–	–
Ohio Valley	1	1–1	.500	1	–	–	–	–
SWAC	1	1–1**	.500	–	–	–	–	–
One and done teams*	13	0–13	.000	–	–	–	–	–

*The America East, Atlantic Sun, Big Sky, Big South, Big West, MAAC, MEAC, Northeast, Patriot, Southern, Southland, Summit, and Sun Belt conferences went 0–1.

**Arkansas-Pine Bluff won the Opening Round game.

The columns R32, S16, E8, F4, and CG respectively stand for the Round of 32, Sweet Sixteen, Elite Eight, Final Four, and championship Game. The number in each field represents an appearance in that round by a team from that conference.

== Media ==
=== Television ===
For the 29th consecutive year, CBS Sports again televised a majority of the event, with the exception of the opening round game, which was televised by ESPN, and first-round games played in the late afternoon, which CBS College Sports Network aired so CBS affiliates could break for local and network news. The championship game scored a Nielsen rating of 16.0.

- Studio: Greg Gumbel, Greg Anthony and Seth Davis
- Jim Nantz, Clark Kellogg and Tracy Wolfson (as sideline reporter for the Final Four and NCAA Championship game) – First and Second Round at Jacksonville, Florida; South Regional at Houston, Texas; Final Four at Indianapolis, Indiana
- Dick Enberg and Jay Bilas – First and Second Round at New Orleans, Louisiana; East Regional at Syracuse, New York
- Verne Lundquist and Bill Raftery – First and Second Round at Providence, Rhode Island; Midwest Regional at St. Louis, Missouri
- Gus Johnson and Len Elmore – First and Second Round at Buffalo, New York; West Regional at Salt Lake City, Utah; championship game on international broadcast
- Kevin Harlan and Dan Bonner – First and Second Round at Oklahoma City, Oklahoma
- Ian Eagle and Jim Spanarkel – First and Second Round at Milwaukee, Wisconsin
- Tim Brando and Mike Gminski – First and Second Round at Spokane, Washington
- Spero Dedes and Bob Wenzel – First and Second Round at San Jose, California

In addition to the main CBS affiliates, many stations opened digital subchannels for additional coverage. Also, on these four occasions, CBS opened the coverage to additional channels to settle conflicts:

- On March 26, during the regional semifinals, South Bend, Indiana affiliate WSBT-TV aired the Purdue-Duke telecast, while its digital subchannel, independent station SBT2, carried Michigan State vs. Northern Iowa. Part of the South Bend market (including the city of Benton Harbor) is located within the state of Michigan.
- On March 25, also within the Sweet 16, the game between Xavier and Kansas State was seen on WKRC-TV and the game between Kentucky and Cornell was seen on WKRC-DT2, also known as "The CW Cincinnati", at the same time. Xavier is located in the city of Cincinnati, while much of the Cincinnati DMA is located within the state of Kentucky. The fan and alumni bases for the University of Kentucky are substantial in the Cincinnati area, and the Wildcats play occasional home games at U.S. Bank Arena.
- On March 19, the first-round game between Clemson and Missouri was shown on WSPA-TV while the game between Wofford and Wisconsin was on WYCW at the same time. Both Clemson and Wofford are located in the upstate area of South Carolina.
- On March 18, the first-round game between North Texas and Kansas State was seen on KTVT, while at the same time Baylor vs. Sam Houston State was shown on KTXA. UNT is in the Dallas/Fort Worth media market (Denton, Texas); Waco, Texas, where Baylor is located, is in a separate DMA. However, some DFW stations are available via cable TV in Waco, and it is believed that more alumni of BU live in the Metroplex than anywhere else. (For similar reasons, KTVT agreed to air the late-afternoon Texas A&M vs. Utah State game on 3/19 after earlier planning not to do so.)

WSPA and WYCW are in a duopoly owned by Media General, and KTVT and KTXA are in a duopoly owned by CBS Corporation.

=== Radio ===
Westwood One again broadcast the tournament.

==== Opening round game ====
- Dave Ryan and Dave Odom – at Dayton, Ohio

==== First and second rounds ====
- Bob Papa and John Thompson – First and Second Rounds at Providence, Rhode Island
- Kevin Kugler and Will Perdue – First and Second Rounds at New Orleans, Louisiana
- Brad Sham and Reid Gettys – First and Second Rounds at Oklahoma City, Oklahoma
- Ted Robinson and Bill Frieder – First and Second Rounds at San Jose, California
- Mark Champion and Kyle Macy – First and Second Rounds at Buffalo, New York
- Gary Cohen and Kevin Grevey – First and Second Rounds at Jacksonville, Florida
- Wayne Larrivee and Pete Gillen – First and Second Rounds at Milwaukee, Wisconsin
- Dave Sims and P. J. Carlesimo – First and Second Rounds at Spokane, Washington

==== Regionals ====
- Ian Eagle and P. J. Carlesimo – East Regional at Syracuse, New York
- Kevin Harlan and John Thompson – Midwest Regional at St. Louis, Missouri
- Kevin Kugler and Pete Gillen – South Regional at Houston, Texas
- Ted Robinson and Bill Frieder – West Regional at Salt Lake City, Utah

==== Final four ====
- Kevin Kugler, John Thompson and Bill Raftery – at Indianapolis, Indiana

John Tautges again served as host of the broadcasts.

==== Local radio ====
Date	Teams	Flagship station	Play-by-play announcer	Color analyst(s)
2010	Duke	WDNC	Bob Harris	John Roth

=== International broadcasters ===
Broadcasters used the CBS feed unless stated otherwise.

- Philippines: Live/delayed on Basketball TV
- Australia: Live/delayed on ONE HD
- Canada: SUN TV in Toronto simulcast CBS broadcasts. The Score Television Network on cable combined CBS broadcasts with its own studio team and used the international feed for the championship game.

== See also ==
- 2010 NCAA Division II men's basketball tournament
- 2010 NCAA Division III men's basketball tournament
- 2010 NCAA Division I women's basketball tournament
- 2010 NCAA Division II women's basketball tournament
- 2010 NCAA Division III women's basketball tournament
- 2010 National Invitation Tournament
- 2010 Women's National Invitation Tournament
- 2010 NAIA Division I men's basketball tournament
- 2010 NAIA Division II men's basketball tournament
- 2010 NAIA Division I women's basketball tournament
- 2010 NAIA Division II women's basketball tournament
- 2010 College Basketball Invitational
- 2010 CollegeInsider.com Postseason Tournament
- 2009–10 NCAA Division I men's basketball season
