= Donald Cole (basketball) =

American basketball player (born 1981)

Personal information
- Born: September 6, 1981 (age 45) Port Arthur, Texas, U.S.
- Listed height: 6 ft 8 in (2.03 m)
- Listed weight: 215 lb (98 kg)

Career information
- High school: Lincoln (Dallas, Texas)
- College: Navarro College (1999–2001); Sam Houston State (2001–2003)
- Playing career: 2003–2020
- Position: Power forward

Career history
- 2003–2004: Cholet
- 2004: Czarni Słupsk
- 2004: ZTE
- 2004–2005: Glasgow Rocks
- 2005–2006: Harlem Globetrotters
- 2006–2007: Gaiteros del Zulia
- 2007–2009: Feni Industries
- 2009–2011: Levski Sofia
- 2011: Sagesse
- 2011–2012: Atomerőmű SE
- 2012–2013: Kazma SC
- 2013–2014: Musel Pikes
- 2015–2016: Al Ain
- 2017: Hoops Club
- 2017–2018: Baniyas
- 2019–2020: Al-Nasr
- 2020: CA Bizertin

Career highlights
- Southland Player of the Year (2003); First-team All-Southland (2003); Second-team All-Southland (2002); Southland Newcomer of the Year (2002)

Donald Cole (born September 6, 1981) is an American former professional basketball player. He played college basketball for Sam Houston State and was named Southland Player of the Year in 2003.
