= Ashton Mitchell =

American basketball player (1988–2018)

Personal information
- Born: August 14, 1988 New Orleans, Louisiana, U.S.
- Died: May 20, 2018 (aged 29) Saint Thomas, U.S. Virgin Islands
- Listed height: 6 ft 0 in (1.83 m)
- Listed weight: 184.8 lb (84 kg)

Career information
- High school: St. Augustine (New Orleans, Louisiana)
- College: Sam Houston State (2006–2010)
- NBA draft: 2010: undrafted
- Playing career: 2010–2018
- Position: Point guard

Career history
- 2010–2011: Liepājas Lauvas
- 2011–2012: Rio Grande Valley Vipers
- 2013–2014: Kolín
- 2014: Metalac Valjevo
- 2015: Alba Fehérvár
- 2016–2017: Valmiera

Ashton Mitchell (August 14, 1988 - May 20, 2018) was an American professional Basketball Player. He played college basketball at the Sam Houston State University.

== Professional career ==
After going undrafted in the 2010 NBA draft, Mitchell signed with BK Liepājas Lauvas of the Latvian Basketball League for the 2010–11 season. In November 2011, he was acquired by the Rio Grande Valley Vipers of the NBA Development League. In January 2012, he was waived by the Vipers.

In November 2013, he signed with BC Kolín of the Czech Republic National Basketball League. He left them in March 2014, and signed with Metalac Valjevo of Serbia for the rest of the season.

On February 17, 2015, Mitchell signed with Alba Fehérvár of Hungary for the rest of the season.

On December 10, 2016, Mitchell signed with Latvian club Valmiera.

== Personal life ==
Ashton died on May 20, 2018 in Saint Thomas, U.S. Virgin Islands.
