= South Dakota Coyotes men's basketball statistical leaders =

The South Dakota Coyotes men's basketball statistical leaders are individual statistical leaders of the South Dakota Coyotes men's basketball program in various categories, including points, assists, blocks, rebounds, and steals. Within those areas, the lists identify single-game, single-season, and career leaders. The Coyotes represent the University of South Dakota in the NCAA's Summit League.

South Dakota began competing in intercollegiate basketball in 1908. However, the school's record book does not generally list records from before the 1950s, as records from before this period are often incomplete and inconsistent. Since scoring was much lower in this era, and teams played much fewer games during a typical season, it is likely that few or no players from this era would appear on these lists anyway.

The NCAA did not officially record assists as a stat until the 1983–84 season, and blocks and steals until the 1985–86 season, but South Dakota's record books includes players in these stats before these seasons. These lists are updated through the end of the 2023–24 season.

== Scoring ==
Career
Rk	Player	Points	Seasons
1	Tim Hatchett	2,280	1986–87 1987–88 1988–89 1989–90
2	Josh Mueller	1,991	2001–02 2002–03 2003–04 2004–05
3	Turner Trofholz	1,931	2002–03 2003–04 2004–05 2005–06
4	Jeff Nannen	1,782	1976–77 1977–78 1978–79 1979–80
5	Mike Graves	1,746	1986–87 1987–88 1988–89 1989–90
6	Louie Krogman	1,644	2008–09 2009–10 2010–11 2011–12
7	Randy Rosenquist	1,612	1990–91 1991–92 1992–93 1993–94
8	Jack Theeler	1,573	1965–66 1966–67 1967–68
9	Chuck Iverson	1,536	1969–70 1970–71 1971–72 1972–73
10	Nate Blessen	1,525	1996–97 1997–98 1998–99 1999–00

Season
Rk	Player	Points	Season
1	Tim Hatchett	787	1989–90
2	Turner Trofholz	704	2004–05
3	Turner Trofholz	650	2005–06
4	Matt Mooney	637	2017–18
5	Matt Mooney	634	2016–17
6	Tommie King	631	2002–03
7	Tim Hatchett	625	1988–89
8	Josh Mueller	619	2004–05
9	Bill Hamer	611	1969–70
10	Jack Theeler	608	1966–67

Single game
Rk	Player	Points	Season	Opponent
1	Jack Theeler	49	1966–67	Northern Iowa
2	Jack Theeler	48	1966–67	South Dakota St.
3	Don Jongewaard	45	1955–56	North Dakota St.
4	Kaleb Stewart	44	2023–24	Denver
5	Turner Trofholz	42	2004–05	Nebraska-Kearney
	Barry Glanzer	42	1980–81	Nebraska-Omaha
	Brent Fahnestock	42	1971–72	Minnesota St.
	Jim Truelson	42	1956–57	Creighton
9	Stanley Umude	41	2020–21	South Dakota St.
	Jack Theeler	41	1966–67	Creighton

== Rebounds ==
Career
Rk	Player	Rebounds	Seasons
1	Chuck Iverson	1,241	1969–70 1970–71 1971–72 1972–73
2	Tyler Cain	1,087	2006–07 2007–08 2008–09 2009–10
3	Turner Trofholz	917	2002–03 2003–04 2004–05 2005–06
4	Tim Hatchett	770	1986–87 1987–88 1988–89 1989–90
	Jeff Rau	770	1987–88 1988–89 1989–90 1990–91
6	Trevor Gruis	767	2010–11 2011–12 2012–13 2013–14
7	Joe Mueting	760	1972–73 1973–74 1974–75 1975–76
8	Steve Anderson	753	2000–01 2001–02 2003–04 2004–05
9	Jeff Nannen	744	1976–77 1977–78 1978–79 1979–80
10	Dick Authier	738	1968–69 1969–70 1970–71 1971–72

Season
Rk	Player	Rebounds	Season
1	Chuck Iverson	448	1972–73
2	Dick Authier	392	1971–72
3	Tyler Cain	333	2009–10
4	Clayton Kiewel	326	1957–58
5	Tyler Cain	319	2008–09
6	Chuck Iverson	302	1970–71
7	Turner Trofholz	295	2005–06
8	Lahat Thioune	287	2023–24
9	Chuck Iverson	281	1971–72
10	Cameron Fens	278	2025–26

Single game
Rk	Player	Rebounds	Season	Opponent
1	Chuck Iverson	36	1972–73	Nebraska-Kearney
2	Chuck Iverson	26	1972–73	Morningside
	Chuck Iverson	26	1972–73	South Dakota Mines
	Dick Authier	26	1971–72	South Dakota St.
5	Jim Truelson	25	1956–57	Winona State
6	Chuck Iverson	24	1972–73	St. Cloud St.
	Clayton Kiewal	24	1957–58	North Dakota St.
8	Clayton Kiewal	23	1956–57	Northern Iowa
	Jim Truelson	23	1956–57	Creighton
	Bill Bruns	23	1963–64	UW Oshkosh

== Assists ==
Career
Rk	Player	Assists	Seasons
1	Josh Mueller	801	2001–02 2002–03 2003–04 2004–05
2	Nate Tibbetts	678	1997–98 1998–99 1999–00 2000–01
3	Rick Nissen	598	1972–73 1973–74 1974–75 1975–76
4	Barry Glanzer	566	1978–79 1979–80 1980–81 1981–82
5	John Hemenway	486	1992–93 1993–94 1994–95 1995–96
6	Mike Graves	464	1986–87 1987–88 1988–89 1989–90
7	Charlie Cutler	399	1970–71 1971–72 1972–73 1973–74
8	John Brenegan	395	1989–90 1990–91 1991–92 1992–93
9	Triston Simpson	392	2016–17 2017–18 2018–19 2019–20
10	Jesse Becker	381	2005–06 2006–07 2007–08 2008–09

Season
Rk	Player	Assists	Season
1	Josh Mueller	246	2003–04
2	Josh Mueller	227	2002–03
3	Nate Tibbetts	216	1997–98
4	Nate Tibbetts	214	2000–01
5	John Hemenway	197	1994–95
6	Barry Glanzer	182	1979–80
7	Josh Mueller	180	2001–02
8	Rick Nissen	178	1974–75
9	Brian McDermott	166	1976–77
10	John Hemenway	165	1995–96

Single game
Rk	Player	Assists	Season	Opponent
1	Brian McDermott	21	1976–77	Mankato State

== Steals ==
Career
Rk	Player	Steals	Seasons
1	Josh Mueller	258	2001–02 2002–03 2003–04 2004–05
2	Nate Tibbetts	215	1997–98 1998–99 1999–00 2000–01
3	Tim Hatchett	208	1986–87 1987–88 1988–89 1989–90
4	Randy Rosenquist	207	1990–91 1991–92 1992–93 1993–94
5	Mike Graves	206	1986–87 1987–88 1988–89 1989–90
6	Fred Franklin	187	1982–83 1983–84 1984–85 1985–86
7	Barry Glanzer	186	1978–79 1979–80 1980–81 1981–82
8	Tyler Cain	184	2006–07 2007–08 2008–09 2009–10
9	Dave Gustafson	135	1981–82 1982–83 1983–84 1984–85
10	Luke Tibbetts	133	2000–01 2001–02 2002–03 2003–04 2004–05

Season
Rk	Player	Steals	Season
1	Joe Hebert	86	1996–97
2	Nate Tibbetts	79	1999–00
3	Josh Mueller	76	2003–04
4	Matt Mooney	75	2016–17
5	Fred Franklin	69	1985–86
6	Matt Mooney	67	2017–18
7	Josh Mueller	66	2004–05
8	Tim Hatchett	65	1987–88
	Fred Franklin	65	1984–85
	Dan Olson	65	1983–84

== Blocks ==
Career
Rk	Player	Blocks	Seasons
1	Tyler Cain	361	2006–07 2007–08 2008–09 2009–10
2	Tim Hatchett	182	1986–87 1987–88 1988–89 1989–90
3	Tyler Flack	144	2012–13 2013–14 2015–16 2016–17
4	Steve Anderson	143	2000–01 2001–02 2003–04 2004–05
5	Steve Smith	137	2006–07 2007–08 2008–09 2009–10
6	Mike Kloth	121	1990–91 1991–92 1992–93 1993–94
7	Trevor Gruis	112	2010–11 2011–12 2012–13 2013–14
8	Stanley Umude	91	2017–18 2018–19 2019–20 2020–21
9	Jeff Rau	90	1987–88 1988–89 1989–90 1990–91
10	Chuck Welke	75	1994–95 1995–96 1996–97 1997–98

Season
Rk	Player	Blocks	Season
1	Tyler Cain	118	2007–08
2	Tyler Cain	97	2009–10
3	Tyler Cain	82	2008–09
4	Tyler Cain	64	2006–07
5	Tim Hatchett	63	1989–90
6	Steve Anderson	60	2003–04
7	Cameron Fens	47	2025–26
8	Tyler Flack	44	2013–14
	Seth Ahrendt	44	1999–00
10	Steve Smith	43	2006–07
	Stanley Umude	43	2019–20

Single game
Rk	Player	Blocks	Season	Opponent
1	Tyler Cain	10	2007–08	Hastings College
