= Great West Conference Men's Basketball Player of the Year =

Former annual basketball award

- Awarded for: the most outstanding basketball player in the Great West Conference
- Country: United States

History
- First award: 2010
- Final award: 2013

The Great West Conference Men's Basketball Player of the Year was an annual award given to the Great West Conference's most outstanding player. The award was first given following the 2009–10 season, the conference's first as a member of NCAA Division I. The Great West was formed on February 25, 2004 as a football-only conference comprising seven schools. On July 10, 2008 it was announced that the Great West would change into an all-sports conference. In 2008–09, the ensuing school year, competition began in a limited number of other sports such as track and field, cross country, and golf. Due to massive conference-switching by dozens of Division I schools during the 2010–13 NCAA conference realignment, the Great West Conference officially disbanded on July 1, 2013, after all but New Jersey Institute of Technology (NJIT) departed.

Tyler Cain, a senior power forward from the University of South Dakota, was the first-ever player of the year in 2010. NJIT led all schools with two winners in the award's brief, four-year history.

== Winners ==
Season	Player	School	Position	Class	Reference
2009–10	Tyler Cain	South Dakota	PF	Senior	
2010–11	Isiah Williams	Utah Valley	PG	Junior	
2011–12	Isaiah Wilkerson	NJIT	SF / SG	Senior	
2012–13	Chris Flores	NJIT	PG / SG	Senior	

== Winners by school ==
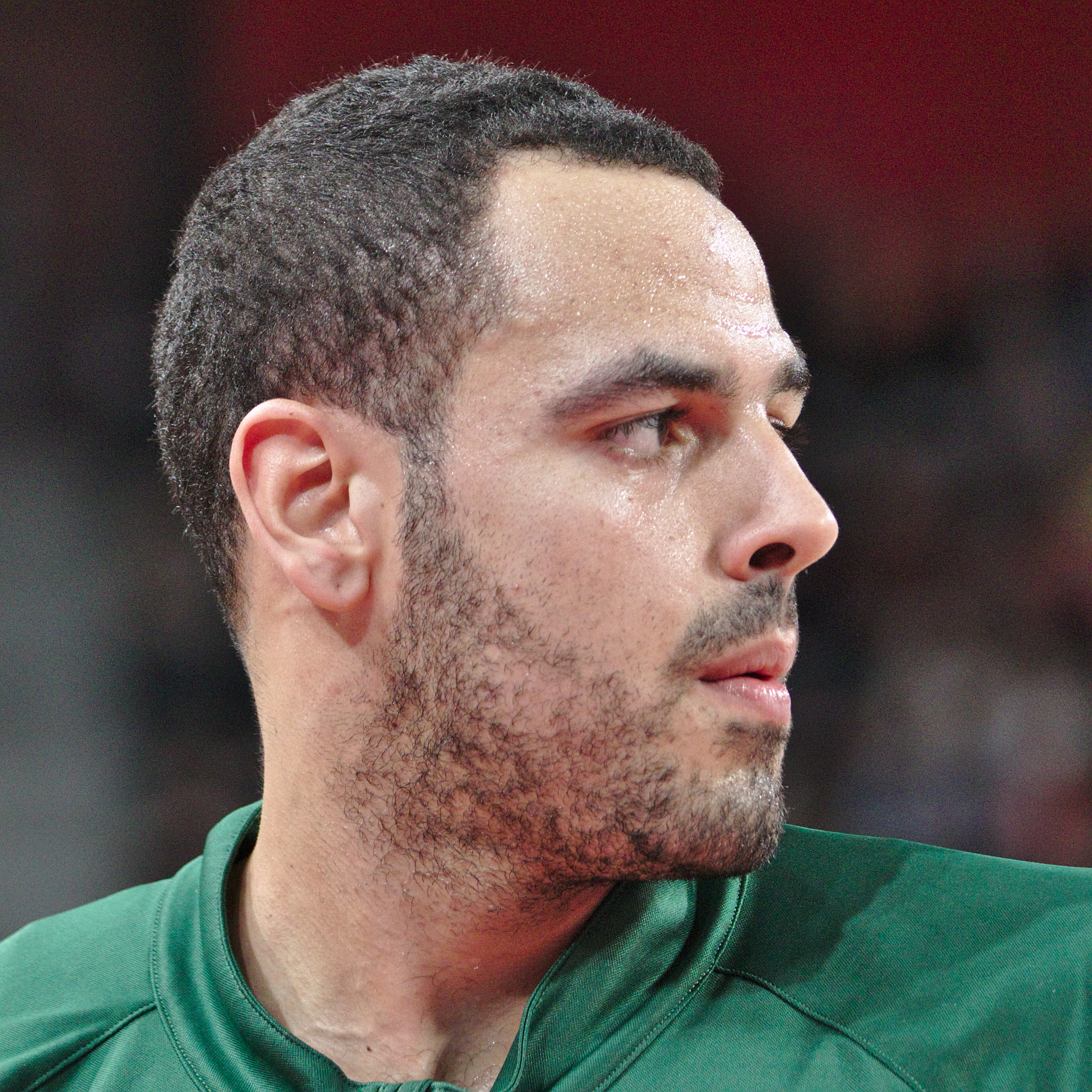
Tyler Cain, South Dakota, 2010

School (year joined)	Winners	Years
NJIT (2008)	2	2012, 2013
South Dakota^{[a]} (2008)	1	2010
Utah Valley (2008)	1	2011
Chicago State (2008)	0	—
Houston Christian (2008)	0	—
North Dakota^{[b]} (2008)	0	—
UT Rio Grande Valley (2008)	0	—

- ^{a} South Dakota joined the Summit League in 2011–12.
- ^{b} North Dakota joined the Big Sky Conference in 2012–13.
