= 2009–10 Great West Conference men's basketball season =

- League: NCAA Division I
- Sport: Basketball
- Duration: January 9, 2010 through March 6, 2010
- Teams: 7

Regular Season

Tournament

Basketball seasons
- ← None 10–11 →

2009–10 Great West Conference men's basketball standings
	Conf.				Overall
Team	W		L	PCT	W		L	PCT
South Dakota †	11	–	1	.917	22	–	10	.688
Houston Baptist	9	–	3	.750	12	–	21	.364
Utah Valley	5	–	7	.417	12	–	18	.400
North Dakota	5	–	7	.417	8	–	23	.258
NJIT	4	–	8	.333	10	–	21	.323
Chicago State	4	–	8	.333	9	–	23	.281
Texas–Pan American	4	–	8	.333	6	–	27	.182
† 2010 Great West tournament winner Rankings from AP Poll

The 2009–10 Great West Conference men's basketball season marked the inaugural season of Great West Conference basketball. The Great West is the first new Division I basketball conference since the Mountain West Conference began play in 1999. In 2008–09, the Great West Conference began competition in basketball, although they were transitioning to Division I at the time.

== Preseason ==
On October 29, 2009, the Great West Conference held its first basketball media day. The league's coaches voted South Dakota the inaugural preseason #1 and South Dakota senior forward Tyler Cain the preseason player of the year.

=== Great West Coaches Poll ===
Rank	Team	Votes
1	South Dakota (3)	41
2	Utah Valley (2)	38
3	Chicago State (1)	35
4	North Dakota (1)	26
5	Houston Baptist	23
6	NJIT	17
7	Texas-Pan American	16

=== Preseason All-Great West Team ===
First Team

- Tyler Cain, South Dakota
- Carl Montgomery, Chicago State
- Jheryl Wilson, NJIT
- Nick Weiermiller, Texas-Pan American
- Louis Krogman, South Dakota

Second Team

- Jordan Swarbrick, Utah Valley
- Travis Bledsoe, North Dakota
- Roman Gentry, South Dakota
- Travis Mertens, North Dakota
- Isaiah Wilkerson, NJIT

Honorable Mention: Mario Flaherty, Houston Baptist; Wendell Preadom, Houston Baptist; Gary Garris, NJIT; Nathan Hawkins, Texas Pan-American; Jon Montgomery, Chicago State; Ben Smith, Texas-Pan American

Preseason Player of the Year

- Tyler Cain, South Dakota

== Postseason ==
As a new Division I conference, the Great West does not receive an automatic bid to the NCAA tournament. However, the league's tournament champion will receive a berth in the CollegeInsider.com Postseason Tournament.

== Conference awards & honors ==
=== Weekly awards ===
Great West Player of the Week
Throughout the conference season, the Great West offices name a player of the week.

Week	Player of the week
November 18	Jordan Swarbrick, UVU
November 23	Mario Flaherty, HBU
November 30	Jake Thomas, USD
December 7	Jordan Swarbrick, UVU
December 14	Mitchell Bouie, USD
December 21	Steve Smith, USD
December 28	Carl Montgomery, CSU
January 4	Tyler Cain, USD
January 11	Corey Claitt, UVU
January 20	
January 27	
February 3	
February 10	
February 17	
February 24	
March 3	
March 10	
