= 2009–10 Missouri Valley Conference men's basketball season =

- League: NCAA Division I
- Sport: Basketball
- Duration: December 29, 2009 through February 27, 2010
- Teams: 10
- TV partner(s): Fox Sports Midwest, ESPN, CBS Sports

Regular Season

Tournament

Basketball seasons

2009–10 Missouri Valley Conference men's basketball standings
	Conf.				Overall
Team	W		L	PCT	W		L	PCT
Northern Iowa †	15	–	3	.833	30	–	5	.857
Wichita State	12	–	6	.667	25	–	10	.714
Illinois State	11	–	7	.611	22	–	11	.667
Creighton	10	–	8	.556	18	–	16	.529
Bradley	9	–	9	.500	16	–	15	.516
Indiana State	9	–	9	.500	17	–	15	.531
Missouri State	8	–	10	.444	24	–	12	.667
Drake	7	–	11	.389	14	–	19	.424
Southern Illinois	6	–	12	.333	15	–	15	.500
Evansville	3	–	15	.167	9	–	21	.300
† 2010 MVC tournament winner As of March 20, 2010; Rankings from AP Poll

The 2009–10 Missouri Valley Conference men's basketball season marked the 101st season of Missouri Valley Conference basketball.

== Preseason ==
In the preseason, Northern Iowa was the conference favorite – returning all five starters and 9 of the top 10 players from their MVC championship team. UNI received all but one first-place vote in the preseason poll of MVC coaches, media, and sports information directors. Creighton received the other first place vote. The preseason player of the year was 2009 MVC conference tournament MVP Osiris Eldridge of Illinois State – who tested the NBA draft waters over the offseason.

Also in the preseason, three MVC players were named to the Lowe's Senior CLASS Award preseason candidate list: Dodie Dunson of Bradley, Adam Koch of Northern Iowa and Josh Young of Drake.

=== MVC Preseason Poll ===
Rank	Team	Votes
1	Northern Iowa (38)	389
2	Creighton (1)	336
3	Illinois State	299
4	Southern Illinois	272
5	Wichita State	216
6	Bradley	208
7	Indiana State	173
8	Drake	105
9	Missouri State	92
10	Evansville	55

=== Preseason All-MVC Team ===
- Kwadzo Ahelegbe, Northern Iowa
- Osiris Eldridge, Illinois State
- Tony Freeman, Southern Illinois
- Adam Koch, Northern Iowa
- P'Allen Stinnett, Creighton
- Josh Young, Drake

Preseason Player of the Year

- Osiris Eldridge, Illinois State

== Regular season ==
=== Non-conference ===
Bradley was dealt a tough blow in their season opener as, for the fourth consecutive season, the Braves suffered an injury to a key player. Senior guard Dodie Dodson broke two bones in his forearm in Bradley's home opener against Idaho State. Bradley won the game, 74–69, but likely lost Dodson for the season. In another memorable opening games, Creighton hung tough at number 21 Dayton, but ultimately lost down the stretch 70–60. The Bluejays led 46–41 at the half and were within 3 points with 2 minutes left to play. Jake Kelly also made his debut for Indiana State, scoring 16 in an 88–58 win over Nebraska-Kerney. Kelly transferred to Indiana State from Iowa to be closer to home after the death of his mother.

==== Mountain West – Missouri Valley Challenge ====
The Missouri Valley Conference won the inaugural challenge with 6 wins to the Mountain West's 4 wins. 2009 marked the inaugural year of the Mountain West - Missouri Valley Challenge – matching teams from the MVC against teams from the Mountain West Conference in an effort to bolster strength of schedule for both leagues. Match-ups were set in January 2009 and were based on 2008–09 preseason projections.

- November 13: Bradley @ BYU – Bradley L 60–70
- November 20: Colorado State @ Indiana State – Indiana State W 65–60
- November 21: Southern Illinois @ UNLV – SIU L 69–78
- December 5: Air Force @ Missouri State – Missouri State W 58–48
- December 12: TCU @ Wichita State – Wichita State W 80–68
- December 19: Creighton @ New Mexico – New Mexico W 66–61
- December 19: Illinois State @ Utah – Illinois State W 73–63
- December 22: San Diego State @ Drake-San Diego State W 76–73 (OT)
- December 23: Wyoming @ Northern Iowa - Northern Iowa W 72–54

== Conference awards & honors ==
=== Weekly awards ===
MVC Players of the Week
Throughout the conference season, the MVC offices name a player and newcomer of the week.

Week	Player of the week	Newcomer of the week
November 16	Carlton Fay, SIU	Wayne Runnels, CRE
November 23	Kyle Weems, MSU	Dwayne Lathan, IN ST
November 30	Kwadzo Ahelegbe, UNI	Adam Leonard, MSU
December 7	Jordan Eglseder, UNI	Colt Ryan, UE
December 14	Kwadzo Ahelegbe (2), UNI	Tony Freeman, SIU
December 21	Clevin Hannah, WSU	Marc Sonnen, UNI
December 28	Jordan Eglseder (2), UNI	Dwayne Lathan (2), IN ST
January 4	Osiris Eldridge, ISU	Jermaine Mallett, MSU
January 11	Jordan Eglseder (3), UNI	Jackie Charmichael, ISU
January 18	Adam Templeton, DU	Gene Teague, SIU
January 25	Sam Maniscalco, BU	Frank Wiseler, DU
February 1	Dinma Odiakosa, ISU	Seth VanDeest, DU
February 8	Sam Maniscalco (2), BU	Adam Leonard (2), MSU
February 15	Dinma Odiakosa (2), ISU	Austin Hill, ISU
February 22	Ali Farokhmanesh, UNI	Seth VanDeest (2), DU
March 1	James Haarsma, UE; Antoine Young, CRE	Adam Leonard (3), MSU
