= 2009–10 South Dakota Coyotes men's basketball team =

American college basketball season

2009–10 South Dakota Coyotes men's basketball
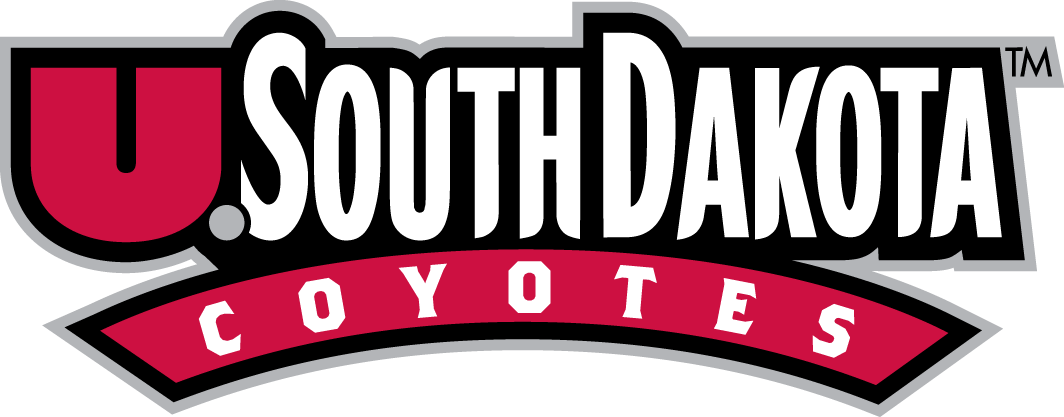

Great West Regular Season Champions Great West Tournament Champions

CIT, First Round
- Conference: Great West Conference
- Record: 22–10 (11–1 GWC)
- Head coach: Dave Boots (22nd season)
- Assistant coaches: Chris Kassin (8th season); Joey James (7th season); Eric Johnson (2nd season)
- Home arena: DakotaDome

2009–10 Great West Conference men's basketball standings
	Conf.				Overall
Team	W		L	PCT	W		L	PCT
South Dakota †	11	–	1	.917	22	–	10	.688
Houston Baptist	9	–	3	.750	12	–	21	.364
North Dakota	5	–	7	.417	8	–	23	.258
Utah Valley	5	–	7	.417	12	–	18	.400
Texas–Pan American	4	–	8	.333	6	–	27	.182
NJIT	4	–	8	.333	10	–	21	.323
Chicago State	4	–	8	.333	9	–	23	.281
† 2010 Great West tournament winner Rankings from AP Poll

The 2009–10 South Dakota Coyotes men's basketball team represented the University of South Dakota in the 2009–10 NCAA Division I men's basketball season. The Coyotes were led by head coach Dave Boots in his 22nd year leading the team. South Dakota played their home games at the DakotaDome in Vermillion, South Dakota, as members of the Great West Conference.

The Coyotes finished conference play with an 11–1 record and won the Great West Conference regular season title. As the top seed in the Great West tournament, South Dakota won two games, culminating in a 91-86 victory over Houston Baptist to win the Great West tournament championship.

As a recently formed conference, the Great West Conference was not eligible for an automatic bid to the NCAA tournament. Instead, as the Great West champion, South Dakota was given an automatic bid to the 2010 CIT. The Coyotes were eliminated in the first round of the CIT by Creighton, 89-78.

The Coyotes finished the season with a 22–10 record.

== Roster ==
2009–10 South Dakota Coyotes men's basketball team
Players
Coaches

Pos.	#	Name	Height	Weight	Year	Hometown
G	0	Mitchell Bouie	6 ft 4 in (1.93 m)	—	Jr	Chicago, Illinois
G/F	2	Roman Gentry	6 ft 4 in (1.93 m)	—	Sr	Sioux City, Iowa
G	3	Cliff Warner	6 ft 0 in (1.83 m)	—	Fr	Altoona, Iowa
G	4	Louie Krogman	6 ft 1 in (1.85 m)	—	So	White River, South Dakota
G	5	Kendall Cutler	6 ft 0 in (1.83 m)	—	Jr	Brooklyn, New York
G	14	Jordan Boots	6 ft 1 in (1.85 m)	—	RS Fr	Vermillion, South Dakota
G	22	Jake Thomas	6 ft 3 in (1.91 m)	—	Fr	Racine, Wisconsin
F	24	Conrad Krutwig	6 ft 6 in (1.98 m)	—	Fr	Algonquin, Illinois
F	30	Tyler Cain	6 ft 8 in (2.03 m)	—	Sr	Rochester, Minnesota
F	32	Dustin Tetzlaff	6 ft 7 in (2.01 m)	—	Fr	Watertown, South Dakota
F	52	Steve Smith	6 ft 11 in (2.11 m)	—	Sr	Sioux Falls, South Dakota

Head coach

- Dave Boots (Augsburg)

Assistant coach(es)

- Joey James (South Dakota)
- Eric Johnson (Wayne State (NE))
- Chris Kassin (South Dakota)

Legend

- (C) Team captain
- (S) Suspended
- (I) Ineligible
- (W) Walk-on
- Injured
- Current redshirt

Roster
Last update: February 19, 2023

== Schedule and results ==
Date time, TV	Rank^{#}	Opponent^{#}	Result	Record	Site (attendance) city, state
Regular season
November 13, 2009*; 7:00 pm		at Texas Tech; Duel in the Desert	L 49–88	0–1	United Spirit Arena (8,541); Lubbock, TX
November 14, 2009*; 9:00 pm		vs. Oregon State; Duel in the Desert	L 47–62	0–2	United Spirit Arena (7,761); Lubbock, TX
November 15, 2009*; 2:00 pm		vs. Texas A&M–Corpus Christi; Duel in the Desert	W 76–73	1–2	United Spirit Arena (1,732); Lubbock, TX
November 20, 2009*; 8:00 pm		Mayville State	W 99–67	2–2	DakotaDome (1,425); Vermillion, SD
November 24, 2009*; 7:00 pm		at Marquette	L 68–93	2–3	Bradley Center (13,731); Milwaukee, WI
November 28, 2009*; 4:00 pm		Dana	W 100–65	3–3	DakotaDome (850); Vermillion, SD
November 29, 2009*; 4:00 pm		Midland Lutheran	W 104–71	4–3	DakotaDome (865); Vermillion, SD
December 2, 2009*; 8:00 pm		Dakota State	W 111–59	5–3	DakotaDome (1,110); Vermillion, SD
December 11, 2009*; 8:00 pm		at Drake; Drake Invitational	L 81–96	5–4	Knapp Center (3,170); Des Moines, IA
December 13, 2009*; 12:00 pm		vs. Binghamton; Drake Invitational	W 89–77	6–4	Knapp Center (167); Des Moines, IA
December 20, 2009*; 8:30 pm		at Wyoming	L 74–86	6–5	Arena-Auditorium (4,330); Laramie, WY
December 28, 2009*; 8:00 pm		Morehead State	L 64–66	6–6	DakotaDome (1,045); Vermillion, SD
January 3, 2010*; 1:00 pm		at No. 12 Kansas State	L 69–91	6–7	Bramlage Coliseum (10,441); Manhattan, KS
January 8, 2010*; 8:30 pm		Cornell	L 65–71	6–8	DakotaDome (2,116); Vermillion, SD
January 9, 2010*; 8:30 pm		SIU Edwardsville	W 100–76	7–8	DakotaDome (1,502); Vermillion, SD
January 12, 2010*; 8:00 pm		Longwood	W 75–63	8–8	DakotaDome (1,056); Vermillion, SD
January 16, 2010; 9:00 pm		North Dakota	W 74–64	9–8 (1–0)	DakotaDome (3,205); Vermillion, SD
January 21, 2010; 9:05 pm		at Utah Valley	L 68–86	9–9 (1–1)	McKay Events Center (740); Orem, UT
January 23, 2010; 8:00 pm		at North Dakota	W 82–64	10–9 (2–1)	Betty Engelstad Sioux Center (4,378); Grand Forks, ND
January 28, 2010; 8:35 pm		at Houston Baptist	W 92–70	11–9 (3–1)	Sharp Gymnasium (609); Houston, TX
January 30, 2010; 5:30 pm		at Texas–Pan American	W 72–71	12–9 (4–1)	UTPA Fieldhouse (458); Edinburg, TX
February 5, 2010*; 8:00 pm		at SIU Edwardsville	W 91–69	13–9	Vadalabene Center (1,380); Edwardsville, IL
February 11, 2010; 9:00 pm		Chicago State	W 79–74	14–9 (5–1)	DakotaDome (1,721); Vermillion, SD
February 18, 2010; 9:00 pm		Utah Valley	W 59–55	15–9 (6–1)	DakotaDome (1,755); Vermillion, SD
February 25, 2010; 7:00 pm		at NJIT	W 68–58	16–9 (7–1)	Fleisher Center (330); Newark, NJ
February 27, 2010; 5:30 pm		at Chicago State	W 58–55	17–9 (8–1)	Jones Convocation Center (1,234); Chicago, IL
March 4, 2010; 9:00 pm		Texas–Pan American	W 85–79 ^{OT}	18–9 (9–1)	DakotaDome (1,477); Vermillion, SD
March 6, 2010; 9:00 pm		Houston Baptist	W 97–84	19–9 (10–1)	DakotaDome (1,744); Vermillion, SD
March 7, 2010; 9:00 pm		NJIT	W 83–49	20–9 (11–1)	DakotaDome (1,023); Vermillion, SD
Great West tournament
March 12, 2010; 7:00 pm	(1)	vs. (5) Texas–Pan American; Great West Semifinals	W 87–46	21–9	McKay Events Center (167); Orem, UT
March 13, 2010; 9:30 pm	(1)	vs. (2) Houston Baptist; Great West Championship Game	W 91–86	22–9	McKay Events Center (139); Orem, UT
CollegeInsider.com tournament
March 16, 2010; 7:05 pm		at Creighton; CIT First Round	L 78–89	22–9	Omaha Civic Auditorium (4,348); Omaha, NE
*Non-conference game. ^{#}Rankings from AP Poll. (#) Tournament seedings in parentheses. All times are in Central Time. Source
