= 2010 Missouri Valley Conference men's basketball tournament =

- Classification: Division I
- Season: 2009–10
- Teams: 10
- Site: Scottrade Center; St. Louis, Missouri
- Champions: Northern Iowa (3rd title)
- Winning coach: Ben Jacobson (2nd title)
- MVP: Kwadzo Ahelegbe (Northern Iowa)
- Television: FSN Midwest, CBS

2009–10 Missouri Valley Conference men's basketball standings
	Conf.				Overall
Team	W		L	PCT	W		L	PCT
Northern Iowa †	15	–	3	.833	30	–	5	.857
Wichita State	12	–	6	.667	25	–	10	.714
Illinois State	11	–	7	.611	22	–	11	.667
Creighton	10	–	8	.556	18	–	16	.529
Bradley	9	–	9	.500	16	–	15	.516
Indiana State	9	–	9	.500	17	–	15	.531
Missouri State	8	–	10	.444	24	–	12	.667
Drake	7	–	11	.389	14	–	19	.424
Southern Illinois	6	–	12	.333	15	–	15	.500
Evansville	3	–	15	.167	9	–	21	.300
† 2010 MVC tournament winner As of March 20, 2010; Rankings from AP Poll

Popularly referred to as "Arch Madness", the 2010 Missouri Valley Conference men's basketball tournament as part of the 2009–10 NCAA Division I men's basketball season was played in St. Louis, Missouri March 4–7, 2010. The tournament was won by the Northern Iowa Panthers, who will receive the Missouri Valley Conference's automatic bid to the 2010 NCAA Men's Division I Basketball Tournament.

== Tournament Bracket ==
Opening Round; Thursday, March 4
8	Drake	63
9	Southern Illinois	61
7	Missouri State	52
10	Evansville	46

Quarterfinals; Friday, March 5
1	Northern Iowa	55
8	Drake	40
4	Creighton	62
5	Bradley	81
2	Wichita State	73
7	Missouri State	63
3	Illinois State	69
6	Indiana State	65

Semifinals; Saturday, March 6
1	Northern Iowa	57
5	Bradley	40
2	Wichita State	65
3	Illinois State	61

Final; Sunday, March 7
1	Northern Iowa	67
2	Wichita State	52

== All-tournament team ==
- Kwadzo Ahelegbe, Northern Iowa
- Sam Maniscalco, Bradley
- Garrett Stutz, Wichita State
- Clevin Hannah, Wichita State
- Jordan Eglseder Northern Iowa

== See also ==
- Missouri Valley Conference
