= Marianapolis Preparatory School =

Catholic high school in Thompson, Connecticut

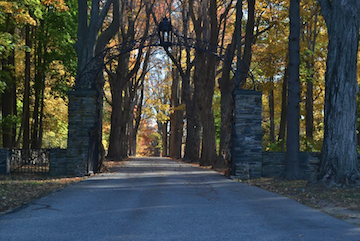

Location
- 26 Chase Road; Thompson, Windham County, Connecticut 06277; United States; 41°57′28″N 71°51′49″W

Information
- Type: Private, boarding, coeducational
- Religious affiliation: Roman Catholic
- Established: 1926 (100 years ago)
- Area trustee: The Trinity Foundation
- CEEB code: 070780
- Head of school: David DiCicco
- Chaplain: Timothy Roth
- Teaching staff: 45
- Grades: 9–12, postgraduate
- Enrollment: 345 (2019-2020)
- Average class size: 14
- Student to teacher ratio: 7:1
- Campus size: 150 acres (0.61 km^{2})
- Campus type: Rural
- Colors: Maroon and gold
- Athletics: Soccer, basketball, volleyball, cross country, wrestling, track and field, indoor track and field, ultimate frisbee, tennis, golf, baseball, softball, lacrosse, crew, badminton, equestrian, dance, gymnastics, martial arts, yoga, swimming, field hockey
- Athletics conference: NEPSAC
- Mascot: Knight
- Team name: The Golden Knights
- Accreditation: New England Association of Schools and Colleges
- Tuition: $18,793 (day); $57,898 (residential)
- Gender ratio: 47% male, 52% female, 1% nonbinary
- Website: www.marianapolis.org

Marianapolis Preparatory School is a private, co-educational, Catholic high school located in Thompson, Connecticut. Approximately 320 students are enrolled in classes 9–12 and a postgraduate year.

== History ==
In 1925, Marian Fathers from Lithuania established Marian Hills College in Hinsdale, Illinois, primarily for Lithuanian Catholics. The priests who founded the school were part of a group welcomed to the United States by the Archbishop of Chicago in 1913. At first, the student body consisted largely of young men of Lithuanian descent. In 1931, it was continued as Marianapolis School and College on campus of 200 acres in Thompson, Connecticut.

Around 1941, enrollment dropped and the college closed. The preparatory school continued to operate. Its once all-Lithuanian student body was no longer limited to that ethnic background. By the 1970s, there were few Lithuanians in the student population of 150.

The first school building burned in 1954; a new one was built for one million dollars.

== Notable alumni ==
- Ike Azotam, professional basketball player
- Tyler Burton, college basketball player for the Richmond Spiders
- Gerard Cowhig, NFL player
- Chris Flores, professional basketball player
- Michael Mallory, professional basketball player
- Aaron Nkrumah, college basketball player
- Greg Senat, NFL player
- George Tobin, NFL player
