= George Tobin (American football) =

American football player (1921–1999)

No. 62
- Position: Guard

Personal information
- Born: July 9, 1921; Arlington, Massachusetts, U.S.
- Died: January 2, 1999 (aged 77); Farmington Hills, Michigan, U.S.
- Listed height: 5 ft 10 in (1.78 m)
- Listed weight: 205 lb (93 kg)

Career information
- High school: Thompson (CT) Marianapolis
- College: Notre Dame
- NFL draft: 1947: undrafted

Career history
- New York Giants (1947)

Awards and highlights
- National champion (1946)
- Stats at Pro Football Reference

George Edward Tobin (July 9, 1921 – January 2, 1999) was an American football guard who played one season with the New York Giants of the National Football League (NFL). He played college football at the University of Notre Dame and attended Marianapolis Preparatory School in Thompson, Connecticut.

== College career ==
Tobin played for the Notre Dame Fighting Irish, lettering for the team in 1942 and 1946. He served in the United States military during World War II from 1943 to 1945.

== Professional career ==
In 1947, Tobin's head coach at Notre Dame Frank Leahy advised him to leave the school and accept a $5,000 offer to play for the NFL's New York Giants. Leahy thought that Tobin would be a starter with the Giants but would not see as much playing time on the talented Fighting Irish. Tobin played in eleven games for the Giants during the 1947 season.
