= 2009–10 Northern Iowa Panthers men's basketball team =

American college basketball season

2009–10 Northern Iowa Panthers men's basketball

MVC Regular Season Champions MVC Tournament Champions

NCAA tournament, Sweet Sixteen
- Conference: Missouri Valley Conference

Ranking
- Coaches: No. 13
- Record: 30–5 (15–3 MVC)
- Head coach: Ben Jacobson (4th season)
- Assistant coaches: Kyle Green; P.J. Hogan; Ben Johnson
- Home arena: McLeod Center

2009–10 Missouri Valley Conference men's basketball standings
	Conf.				Overall
Team	W		L	PCT	W		L	PCT
Northern Iowa †	15	–	3	.833	30	–	5	.857
Wichita State	12	–	6	.667	25	–	10	.714
Illinois State	11	–	7	.611	22	–	11	.667
Creighton	10	–	8	.556	18	–	16	.529
Bradley	9	–	9	.500	16	–	15	.516
Indiana State	9	–	9	.500	17	–	15	.531
Missouri State	8	–	10	.444	24	–	12	.667
Drake	7	–	11	.389	14	–	19	.424
Southern Illinois	6	–	12	.333	15	–	15	.500
Evansville	3	–	15	.167	9	–	21	.300
† 2010 MVC tournament winner As of March 20, 2010; Rankings from AP Poll

The 2009–10 Northern Iowa Panthers men's basketball team represented the University of Northern Iowa in the 2009-10 NCAA Division I men's basketball season. The team, which plays in the Missouri Valley Conference (MVC), was led by fourth-year head coach Ben Jacobson and played their home games at the McLeod Center. They went 15–3 during the regular conference season to win the regular season championship. The Panthers also won the 2010 Missouri Valley Conference men's basketball tournament to earn the conference's automatic bid to the 2010 NCAA Division I men's basketball tournament. They earned a 9 seed in the Midwest Region where they defeated 8 seed UNLV in the first round and upset the overall 1 seed Kansas in the second round to advance to the Sweet Sixteen at Edward Jones Dome in St. Louis.

While they lost in their next game to Michigan State, they got a unique parting gift. Because the NCAA has been increasingly using non-traditional basketball venues in recent NCAA tournaments, it has been building new courts for its regional sites and then selling them to schools in need of a court. UNI purchased the court on which the Panthers played in their loss to the Spartans, and installed it at McLeod Center for the 2010–11 season.

== Roster ==
#	Name	Height	Weight (lbs.)	Position	Class	Hometown	Previous Team(s)
Players
5	Ali Farokhmanesh	6'0"	190	G	Sr.	Iowa City, IA, U.S.	Iowa City West HS; Indian Hills CC; Kirkwood CC
10	Brian Haak	6'1"	175	G	Sr.	Spencer, IA, U.S.	Spencer HS
11	Kwadzo Ahelegbe	6'2"	200	G	Jr.	Oakdale, MN, U.S.	Tartan HS
13	Johnny Moran	6'1"	190	G	So.	Algonquin, IL, U.S.	Jacobs HS
15	B. J. Ray	6'3"	205	G	Fr.	Waynesville, MO, U.S.	Waynesville HS
20	Jake Koch	6'9"	255	F	Fr. (RS)	Ashwaubenon, WI, U.S.	Ashwaubenon HS
21	Matt Morrison	6'0"	175	G	Fr.	Solon, IA, U.S.	Solon HS
22	Kerwin Dunham	6'6"	200	G	Jr.	Bondurant, IA, U.S.	Bondurant–Farrar HS
23	Marc Sonnen	6'3"	185	G	Fr.	St. Paul, MN, U.S.	Tartan HS
32	Lucas O'Rear	6'6"	255	F	Jr.	Du Bois, IL, U.S.	Nashville HS
33	Austin Pehl	6'10"	245	C	Fr. (RS)	Cedar Falls, IA, U.S.	Cedar Falls HS
34	Adam Koch	6'8"	255	F	Sr.	Ashwaubenon, WI, U.S.	Ashwaubenon HS
40	Tyler Lange	6'6"	210	F	Fr.	Sac City, IA, U.S.	Urbandale HS
43	Adam Rodenberg	6'6"	245	C	Sr.	Garnavillo, IA, U.S.	Clayton Ridge HS; Kirkwood CC; UC Irvine
52	Anthony James	6'0"	175	G	Fr. (RS)	St. Louis, MO, U.S.	Normandy HS
53	Jordan Eglseder	7'0"	280	C	Sr.	Bellevue, IA, U.S.	Marquette HS

== Schedule and results ==
Date time, TV	Rank^{#}	Opponent^{#}	Result	Record	Site (attendance) city, state
Exhibition
10/31/2009; 12:05pm		Upper Iowa	W 67–39	—	McLeod Center (1,525); Cedar Falls, IA
11/07/2009; 12:05pm		UNC Pembroke	W 79–44	—	McLeod Center (1,528); Cedar Falls, IA
Regular Season
11/13/2009*; 8:30pm		at Denver	W 71–65	1–0	Magness Arena (2,082); Denver, CO
11/20/2009*; 12:05pm		vs. DePaul; Paradise Jam	L 52–60	1–1	Sports and Fitness Center (3,117); St. Thomas, VI
11/21/2009*; 2:30pm		vs. East Carolina; Paradise Jam	W 74–68	2–1	Sports and Fitness Center (1,795); St. Thomas, VI
11/23/2009*; 2:30pm		vs. Boston College; Paradise Jam	W 81–69	3–1	Sports and Fitness Center (531); St. Thomas, VI
11/28/2009; 7:05pm, KWWL/CFU 15		Northern Illinois	W 52–45	4–1	McLeod Center (4,083); Cedar Falls, IA
12/2/2009; 7:05pm, CFU 15		at Iowa State	W 63–60	5–1	Hilton Coliseum (14,376); Ames, IA
12/8/2009; 7:05pm, KWWL/CFU 15		Iowa	W 67–50	6–1	McLeod Center (6,480); Cedar Falls, IA
12/12/2009; 7:05pm, KWWL/CFU 15		Siena	W 82–65	7–1	McLeod Center (5,096); Cedar Falls, IA
12/19/2009; 1:05pm, FCS		at North Dakota	W 64–41	8–1	Betty Engelstad Sioux Center (1,961); Grand Forks, ND
12/23/2009; 7:05pm, KWWL/CFU 15		Wyoming; MWC–MVC Challenge	W 72–54	9–1	McLeod Center (3,102); Cedar Falls, IA
12/29/2009; 7:05pm		at Creighton	W 60–52	10–1 (1–0)	Qwest Center (17,152); Omaha, NE
1/1/2010; 7:05pm		Evansville	W 65–46	11–1 (2–0)	McLeod Center (4,450); Cedar Falls, IA
1/3/2010; 1:05pm, KWWL/CFU 15		Missouri State	W 84–76	12–1 (3–0)	McLeod Center (4,666); Cedar Falls, IA
1/6/2010; 8:00pm, ESPNU		at Southern Illinois	W 61–49	13–1 (4–0)	SIU Arena (4,679); Carbondale, IL
1/9/2010; 3:00pm, ESPN2		at Illinois State	W 59–44	14–1 (5–0)	Redbird Arena (7,755); Normal, IL
1/12/2010; 8:05pm, ESPNU		Bradley	W 52–50	15–1 (6–0)	McLeod Center (4,892); Cedar Falls, IA
1/16/2010; 7:05pm, KWWL/CFU 15		Indiana State	W 62–40	16–1 (7–0)	McLeod Center (6,778); Cedar Falls, IA
1/19/2010; 8:00pm, ESPNU	No. 20	at Wichita State	L 51–60	16–2 (7–1)	Charles Koch Arena (10,506); Wichita, KS
1/24/2010; 2:05pm, MVC TV	No. 20	at Indiana State	W 67–58	17–2 (8–1)	Hulman Center (3,407); Terre Haute, IN
1/27/2010; 7:05pm, KWWL/CFU 15		Drake	W 67–51	18–2 (9–1)	McLeod Center (6,069); Cedar Falls, IA
1/30/2010; 2:05pm		at Missouri State	W 55–54	19–2 (10–1)	JQH Arena (9,087); Springfield, MO
2/3/2010; 7:05pm, KWWL	No. 24	Wichita State	W 59–56	20–2 (11–1)	McLeod Center (6,723); Cedar Falls, IA
2/6/2010; 5:00pm, ESPN2	No. 24	Southern Illinois	W 55–51	21–2 (12–1)	McLeod Center (6,839); Cedar Falls, IA
2/10/2010; 7:05pm, CFU 15	No. 19	at Drake	W 57–48	22–2 (13–1)	Knapp Center (7,152); Des Moines, IA
2/13/2010; 1:05pm, MVC TV	No. 19	at Bradley	L 59–68	22–3 (13–2)	Carver Arena (9,887); Peoria, IL
2/16/2010; 7:05pm, MVC TV		at Creighton	W 70–52	23–3 (14–2)	McLeod Center (5,440); Cedar Falls, IA
2/19/2010*; 6:00pm, ESPN2		Old Dominion; ESPN BracketBusters	W 71–62	24–3	McLeod Center (7,031); Cedar Falls, IA
2/23/2010; 7:05pm	No. 25	at Evansville	L 54–55	24–4 (14–3)	Roberts Municipal Stadium (4,716); Evansville, IN
2/27/2010; 7:05pm, ESPN2	No. 25	Illinois State	W 61–55	25–4 (15–3)	McLeod Center (7,366); Cedar Falls, IA
Missouri Valley tournament
3/5/2010; 12:05pm, MVC TV	(1)	vs. (8) Drake; MVC Quarterfinals	W 55–40	26–4	Scottrade Center (10,830); St. Louis, MO
3/6/2010; 1:35pm, MVC TV	(1)	vs. (5) Bradley; MVC Semifinals	W 57–40	27–4	Scottrade Center (13,814); St. Louis, MO
3/7/2010; 1:05pm, CBS	(1)	vs. (2) Wichita State; MVC Championship Game	W 67–52	28–4	Scottrade Center (9,297); St. Louis, MO
NCAA tournament
3/18/2010*; 6:10pm, CBS	(9 MW)	vs. (8 MW) UNLV; NCAA First Round	W 69–66	29–4	Ford Center (13,484); Oklahoma City, OK
3/20/2010*; 4:40pm, CBS	(9 MW)	vs. (1 MW) No. 1 Kansas; NCAA Second Round	W 69–67	30–4	Ford Center (15,668); Oklahoma City, OK
3/26/2010*; 8:37pm, CBS	(9 MW)	vs. (5 MW) No. 13 Michigan State; NCAA Sweet Sixteen	L 52–59	30–5	Edward Jones Dome (26,377); St. Louis, MO
*Non-conference game. ^{#}Rankings from AP Poll. (#) Tournament seedings in parentheses. MW=NCAA Midwest Region. All times are in Central Time.
