= 2009–10 Missouri State Bears basketball team =

American college basketball season

2009–10 Missouri State Bears men's basketball

CIT Champions
- Conference: Missouri Valley Conference
- Record: 24–12 (8–10 MVC)
- Head coach: Cuonzo Martin (2nd season)
- Assistant coaches: Steve Woodberry (4th season); Kent Williams (2nd season); Jon Harris (2nd season); Trevyor Fisher (5th season)
- Home arena: JQH Arena

2009–10 Missouri Valley Conference men's basketball standings
	Conf.				Overall
Team	W		L	PCT	W		L	PCT
Northern Iowa †	15	–	3	.833	30	–	5	.857
Wichita State	12	–	6	.667	25	–	10	.714
Illinois State	11	–	7	.611	22	–	11	.667
Creighton	10	–	8	.556	18	–	16	.529
Bradley	9	–	9	.500	16	–	15	.516
Indiana State	9	–	9	.500	17	–	15	.531
Missouri State	8	–	10	.444	24	–	12	.667
Drake	7	–	11	.389	14	–	19	.424
Southern Illinois	6	–	12	.333	15	–	15	.500
Evansville	3	–	15	.167	9	–	21	.300
† 2010 MVC tournament winner As of March 20, 2010; Rankings from AP Poll

The 2009–10 Missouri State Bears basketball team represented Missouri State University in National Collegiate Athletic Association (NCAA) Division I men's basketball during the 2009–10 season. Playing in the Missouri Valley Conference (MVC) and led by second-year head coach Cuonzo Martin, the Bears finished the season with a 24–12 overall record and won the 2010 CollegeInsider.com Postseason Tournament.

In MVC play, the Bears finished in seventh place with a 8–10 record. They advanced to the quarterfinals of the 2009 MVC tournament, where they lost to Wichita State, 73–63.

== Roster ==
2009–10 Missouri State Bears men's basketball team
Players
Coaches

Pos.	#	Name	Height	Weight	Year	Previous school	Hometown
G	00	Justin Fuehrmeyer	6 ft 0 in (1.83 m)	165 lb (75 kg)	RS Sr	Francis Howell Central HS	St. Charles, Missouri
G/F	1	Keith Pickens	6 ft 4 in (1.93 m)	190 lb (86 kg)	Fr	Oakville HS	St. Louis, Missouri
G	2	Nafis Ricks	6 ft 1 in (1.85 m)	195 lb (88 kg)	Jr	Johnson County CC	Philadelphia, Pennsylvania
G	10	Adam Leonard	6 ft 1 in (1.85 m)	195 lb (88 kg)	RS Jr	Eastern Kentucky	Lee's Summit, Missouri
G	15	Jermaine Mallett	6 ft 3 in (1.91 m)	215 lb (98 kg)	Jr	Marion Military Institute	Jackson, Mississippi
F	20	Michael Porter	6 ft 6 in (1.98 m)	225 lb (102 kg)	Fr	Sikeston HS	Sikeston, Missouri
C	21	Caleb Patterson	6 ft 11 in (2.11 m)	240 lb (109 kg)	RS So	Colorado	Ames, Oklahoma
F	30	Ryan Jehle	6 ft 6 in (1.98 m)	225 lb (102 kg)	RS Sr	Shawnee Mission South HS	Overland Park, Kansas
F	33	Jerome Jones	6 ft 5 in (1.96 m)	205 lb (93 kg)	Fr	Clyde C. Miller Career Academy	St. Louis, Missouri
F	34	Kyle Weems	6 ft 6 in (1.98 m)	210 lb (95 kg)	So	Highland Park HS	Topeka, Kansas
C	44	Will Creekmore	6 ft 9 in (2.06 m)	242 lb (110 kg)	Jr	Boston University	Tulsa, Oklahoma
C	50	Isaiah Rhine	6 ft 10 in (2.08 m)	225 lb (102 kg)	So	Versailles HS	Versailles, Missouri

Head coach

- Cuonzo Martin (Purdue '95)

Assistant coach(es)

- Steve Woodberry (Kansas '94)
- Kent Williams (Southern Illinois '03)
- Jon Harris (Marquette '02)
- Trevyor Fisher (Missouri State '05)

Legend

- (C) Team captain
- (S) Suspended
- (I) Ineligible
- (W) Walk-on
- Injured
- Current redshirt

Roster
Last update: 9–8–2019

== Schedule ==
Date time, TV	Rank^{#}	Opponent^{#}	Result	Record	Site (attendance) city, state
Exhibition Season
11/2/09*; 7:05 pm		Missouri–St. Louis	W 86–48	—	JQH Arena (3,832); Springfield, MO
11/10/09*; 7:05 pm		Henderson State	W 79–52	–	JQH Arena (3,872); Springfield, MO
Regular Season
11/16/09*; 7:05 pm, Mediacom 22		Auburn	W 73–62	1–0	JQH Arena (7,213); Springfield, MO
11/20/09*; 8:05 pm		Maryland–Eastern Shore; Hispanic College Fund Classic	W 70–53	2–0	JQH Arena (5,134); Springfield, MO
11/21/09*; 8:05 pm		The Citadel; Hispanic College Fund Classic	W 72–55	3–0	JQH Arena (5,234); Springfield, MO
11/22/09*; 8:05 pm		Eastern Michigan; Hispanic College Fund Classic	W 75–61	4–0	JQH Arena (4,491); Springfield, MO
11/28/09*; 7:05 pm		Tulsa	W 83–75	5–0	JQH Arena (7,389); Springfield, MO
12/2/09*; 7:35 pm		at Arkansas–Little Rock	W 75–62	6–0	Jack Stephens Center (3,460); Little Rock, AR
12/5/09*; 7:05 pm		Air Force; Mountain West–Missouri Valley Challenge	W 58–48	7–0	JQH Arena (7,524); Springfield, MO
12/9/09*; 7:05 pm		Tennessee–Martin	W 79–51	8–0	JQH Arena (5,144); Springfield, MO
12/12/09*; 7:05 pm, Mediacom 22		at Arkansas State	W 75–64	9–0	Convocation Center (3,162); Jonesboro, AR
12/19/09*; 7:00 pm, Mediacom 22		Saint Louis	W 81–65	10–0	Chaifetz Arena (8,483); St. Louis, MO
12/22/2009*; 7:00 pm		at Arkansas	L 62–66 ^{OT}	10–1	Bud Walton Arena (14,194); Fayetteville, AR
12/29/09; 7:05 pm, Mediacom 22		at Evansville	W 74–60	11–1 (1–0)	Roberts Municipal Stadium (5,510); Evansville, IN
1/1/10; 7:05 pm, CSN Chicago		Illinois State	W 68–64	12–1 (2–0)	JQH Arena (10,008); Springfield, MO
1/3/10; 1:05 pm, CFU 15/KWWL/Mediacom 22		at Northern Iowa	L 76–84	12–2 (2–1)	McLeod Center (4,666); Cedar Falls, IA
1/6/10; 7:05 pm, Cox Kansas 22		Wichita State	L 62–65	12–3 (2–2)	JQH Arena (7,135); Springfield, MO
1/9/10; 2:05 pm		Bradley	W 88–69	13–3 (3–2)	JQH Arena (9,111); Springfield, MO
1/12/10; 7:05 pm, Mediacom 22		Drake	L 77–88	13–4 (3–3)	The Knapp Center (3,258); Des Moines, IA
1/16/10; 2:05 pm, Mediacom 22		at Bradley	L 56–74	13–5 (3–4)	Carver Arena (9,628); Peoria, IL
1/19/10; 7:07 pm, FS Midwest		Indiana State	W 99–92 ^{OT}	14–5 (4–4)	JQH Arena (7,343); Springfield, MO
1/24/10; 7:07 pm		Creighton	L 72–76	14–6 (4–5)	Qwest Center Omaha (15,153); Omaha, NE
1/27/10; 7:05 pm		at Evansville	W 76–66	15–6 (5–5)	JQH Arena (7,430); Springfield, MO
1/30/10; 2:05 pm, Mediacom 22		No. 25 Northern Iowa	L 54–55	15–7 (5–6)	JQH Arena (9,087); Springfield, MO
2/3/10; 7:05 pm, Mediacom 22		at Southern Illinois	L 67–73	15–8 (5–7)	SIU Arena (4,289); Carbondale, IL
2/6/10; 7:05 pm		Creighton	W 70–52	16–8 (6–7)	JQH Arena (9,101); Springfield, MO
2/10/10; 7:05 pm		Southern Illinois	W 77–72	17–8 (7–7)	JQH Arena (7,088); Springfield, MO
2/14/10; 7:05 pm, ESPNU		at Wichita State	L 64–66	17–9 (7–8)	Charles Koch Arena (10,506); Wichita, KS
2/17/10; 8:05 pm, FSN		at Illinois State	L 72–76	17–10 (7–9)	Redbird Arena (6,039); Normal, IL
2/20/10*; 2:05 pm, ESPN2		Nevada; ESPN BracketBusters	L 67–80	18–10	JQH Arena (7,805); Springfield, MO
2/24/10; 7:05 pm, Mediacom 22		at Drake	W 75–59	19–10 (8–9)	JQH Arena (7,951); Springfield, MO
2/27/10; 2:05 pm		Indiana State	L 72–75 ^{OT}	19–11 (8–10)	Hulman Center (10,200); Terre Haute, IN
Conference Tournament
3/4/10; 8:35 pm, MVC TV	(7)	vs. (10) Evansville; Opening Round	W 52–46	20–11	Scottrade Center (7,490); St. Louis, MO
3/5/10; 6:07 pm, MVC TV	(7)	vs. (2) Wichita State; Quarterfinal	L 63–73	20–12	Scottrade Center (10,182); St. Louis, MO
CollegeInsider.com Postseason Tournament
3/17/10*; 7:05 pm		Middle Tennessee State; First Round	W 87–79	21–12	JQH Arena (3,023); Springfield, MO
3/22/10*; 7:05 pm		Louisiana Tech; Quarterfinal	W 69–40	22–12	JQH Arena (3,015); Springfield, MO
3/24/10; 7:05 pm		Creighton; Semifinal	W 67–61	23–12	JQH Arena (3,112); Springfield, MO
3/30/10*; 7:07 pm, Fox College Sports		Pacific; Final	W 78–65	24–12	JQH Arena (6,205); Springfield, MO
*Non-conference game. ^{#}Rankings from AP Poll. (#) Tournament seedings in parentheses. All times are in Central Time.
