= 2010 Great West Conference men's basketball tournament =

- Tournament logo
- Classification: Division I
- Season: 2009–10
- Teams: 7
- Site: McKay Events Center; Orem, Utah
- Champions: South Dakota (1st title)
- Winning coach: Dave Boots (1st title)
- MVP: Kendall Cutler (South Dakota)

2009–10 Great West Conference men's basketball standings
	Conf.				Overall
Team	W		L	PCT	W		L	PCT
South Dakota †	11	–	1	.917	22	–	10	.688
Houston Baptist	9	–	3	.750	12	–	21	.364
North Dakota	5	–	7	.417	8	–	23	.258
Utah Valley	5	–	7	.417	12	–	18	.400
Texas–Pan American	4	–	8	.333	6	–	27	.182
NJIT	4	–	8	.333	10	–	21	.323
Chicago State	4	–	8	.333	9	–	23	.281
† 2010 Great West tournament winner Rankings from AP Poll

The 2010 Great West Conference men's basketball tournament took place March 10–13, 2010, in Orem, Utah. This was the inaugural tournament for the league. Per NCAA regulations as a new Division I conference, the Great West champion did not receive an automatic bid into the NCAA tournament. However, the champion received an automatic bid to the 2010 CollegeInsider.com Tournament.

== Format ==
All seven conference members participated in the tournament with seeding based on results from the regular season; the number one seed received a bye to the semifinal round.

== Bracket ==
Quarterfinal round Wednesday, March 10
4	Utah Valley	53
5	Texas–Pan American	56
2	Houston Baptist	80
7	Chicago State	77
3	North Dakota	57
6	NJIT	70

Semifinal round Friday, March 12
1	South Dakota	76
5	Texas–Pan American	71
2	Houston Baptist	74
6	NJIT	64

Championship round Saturday, March 13
1	South Dakota	91
2	Houston Baptist	86
