= 2009–10 Wichita State Shockers men's basketball team =

American college basketball season

2009–10 Wichita State Shockers men's basketball

NIT First Round
- Conference: Missouri Valley Conference
- Record: 25–10 (12–6 MVC)
- Head coach: Gregg Marshall (3rd season)
- Assistant coaches: Earl Grant; Marty Gross; Chris Jans
- Home arena: Charles Koch Arena capacity:10,506

2009–10 Missouri Valley Conference men's basketball standings
	Conf.				Overall
Team	W		L	PCT	W		L	PCT
Northern Iowa †	15	–	3	.833	30	–	5	.857
Wichita State	12	–	6	.667	25	–	10	.714
Illinois State	11	–	7	.611	22	–	11	.667
Creighton	10	–	8	.556	18	–	16	.529
Bradley	9	–	9	.500	16	–	15	.516
Indiana State	9	–	9	.500	17	–	15	.531
Missouri State	8	–	10	.444	24	–	12	.667
Drake	7	–	11	.389	14	–	19	.424
Southern Illinois	6	–	12	.333	15	–	15	.500
Evansville	3	–	15	.167	9	–	21	.300
† 2010 MVC tournament winner As of March 20, 2010; Rankings from AP Poll

The 2009–10 Wichita State Shockers men's basketball team represented Wichita State University in the 2009–10 NCAA Division I men's basketball season. The team, which plays in the Missouri Valley Conference (MVC), was led by third-year head coach Gregg Marshall. The Shockers were preseason rank #77 in Rivals.com's Preseason 1-347 Rankings. They were also picked to finish 4th in the MVC by Rivals and 5th by the MVC Committee. The Shockers played their 2009-10 home games at Charles Koch Arena, on the campus of Wichita State University. The Shockers finished the season 25–10, 12–6 in MVC play, lost in the championship game of the 2010 Missouri Valley Conference men's basketball tournament and were invited to the 2010 National Invitation Tournament, where they lost in the first round to Nevada. They finished the season with an RPI of 68, much below their season average of 55. The Shockers also received votes in the AP Coaches Poll in the season, going as high as the #34 spot.

== Roster ==
The team had 15 players on the roster. Note: Flags indicate national team eligibility at FIBA sanctioned events. Players may hold other non-FIBA nationality not displayed.

No.		Position	Player
0	(United States)	F	Aaron Ellis
2	(United States)	G	Kenny Manigault
3	(United States)	G	Clevin Hannah
4	(United States)	F	Jerome Hamilton
5	(United States)	G	Demetric Williams
11	(United States)	F	Mason Felter
14	(United States)	G/F	Graham Hatch
22	(United States)	F	Tyler Richardson
23	(United States)	G	Toure' Murry
24	(United States)	G	David Kyles
25	(United States)	G	Derek Brown
30	(United States)	G	Jalil Nakfoor
31	(United States)	F	J. T. Durley
32	(United States)	F	Gabe Blair
33	(United States)	G	Bryce Mayes
41	(United States)	C	Garrett Stutz

== 2009-10 Schedule and results ==
Date time, TV	Rank^{#}	Opponent^{#}	Result	Record	Site (attendance) city, state
Exhibition
Sat, Nov 7; 7:05pm		Newman	W 81–69	—	Charles Koch Arena (10,228); Wichita, KS
Regular Season
Sun, Nov 15*; 3:05pm, ESPNU		Fairleigh Dickinson; College Basketball Experience Classic	W 80–64	1–0	Charles Koch Arena (10,166); Wichita, KS
Wed, Nov 18*; 9:30pm		Arkansas–Monticello; College Basketball Experience Classic	W 79–50	2–0	Charles Koch Arena (10,214); Wichita, KS
Mon, Nov 23*; 6:30pm, ESPN2		vs. Pittsburgh; College Basketball Experience Classic	L 55–68	2–1	Sprint Center; Kansas City, MO
Tue, Nov 24*; 6:45pm, ESPNU		vs. Iowa; College Basketball Experience Classic	W 74–57	3–1	Sprint Center (8,076); Kansas City, MO
Sat, Nov 28*; 1:05pm, Kansas 22		at Cleveland State	W 69–54	4–1	Wolstein Center (2,442); Cleveland, OH
Mon, Nov 30*; 7:05pm		Alcorn State	W 87–52	5–1	Charles Koch Arena (10,103); Wichita, KS
Thu, Dec 3*; 7:05pm		Texas Southern	W 74–43	6–1	Charles Koch Arena (10,237); Wichita, KS
Sat, Dec 5*; 7:05pm		USC Upstate	W 72–45	7–1	Charles Koch Arena (10,263); Wichita, KS
Wed, Dec 9*; 7:05pm, KWCH		at UMKC	W 73–52	8–1	Municipal Auditorium (1,744); Kansas City, MO
Sat, Dec 12*; 7:05pm		TCU	W 80–68	9–1	Charles Koch Arena (10,506); Wichita, KS
Sat, Dec 19*; 7:05pm, Kansas 22		No. 16 Texas Tech	W 85–83	10–1	Charles Koch Arena (10,506); Wichita, KS
Mon, Dec 21*; 7:05pm		North Dakota State	W 69–57	11–1	Charles Koch Arena (10,400); Wichita, KS
Tue, Dec 29; 7:05pm, Kansas 22		at Illinois State	L 57–72	11–2 (0–1)	Redbird Arena (7,408); Normal, IL
Fri, Jan 1; 7:05pm, Kansas 22		Drake	W 61–38	12–2 (1–1)	Charles Koch Arena (10,506); Wichita, KS
Sun, Jan 3; 2:05pm, Kansas 22		Bradley	W 81–69	13–2 (2–1)	Charles Koch Arena (10,506); Wichita, KS
Wed, Jan 6; 7:05pm, Kansas 22		at Missouri State	W 65–62	14–2 (3–1)	JQH Arena (7,135); Springfield, MO
Sat, Jan 9; 1:05pm, ESPNU		Creighton	W 70–58	15–2 (4–1)	Charles Koch Arena (10,506); Wichita, KS
Wed, Jan 13; 6:05pm, Kansas 22		at Indiana State	W 84–73	16–2 (5–1)	Hulman Center (4,577); Terre Haute, IN
Sat, Jan 16; 4:05pm, ESPN2		at Creighton	L 56–57	16–3 (5–2)	Qwest Center Omaha (16,955); Omaha, NE
Tue, Jan 19; 8:05pm, ESPNU		No. 20 Northern Iowa	W 60–51	17–3 (6–2)	Charles Koch Arena (10,506); Wichita, KS
Sat, Jan 23; 1:05pm, MVC-TV		at Drake	L 64–78	17–4 (6–3)	Knapp Center (4,826); Des Moines, IA
Wed, Jan 27; 6:05pm, MVC-TV		Illinois State	W 74–66	18–4 (7–3)	Charles Koch Arena (10,506); Wichita, KS
Sun, Jan 31; 7:05pm, ESPNU		at Southern Illinois	W 55–54	19–4 (8–3)	SIU Arena (4,786); Carbondale, IL
Wed, Feb 3; 7:05pm, Kansas 22		at No. 24 Northern Iowa	L 56–59	19–5 (8–4)	McLeod Center (6,723); Cedar Falls, IA
Sat, Feb 6; 7:05pm, Kansas 22		Indiana State	W 76–70	20–5 (9–4)	Charles Koch Arena (10,506); Wichita, KS
Tue, Feb 9; 7:05pm, Kansas 22		at Evansville	L 62–65	20–6 (9–5)	Roberts Stadium (3,663); Evansville, IN
Sun, Feb 14; 7:05pm, ESPNU		Missouri State	W 66–64	21–6 (10–5)	Charles Koch Arena (10,506); Wichita, KS
Wed, Feb 17; 7:05pm		Evansville	W 76–70 ^{OT}	22–6 (11–5)	Charles Koch Arena (10,410); Wichita, KS
Sat, Feb 20*; 11:00pm, ESPN2		at Utah State; ESPN BracketBusters	L 58–68	22–7	Smith Spectrum (10,270); Logan, UT
Wed, Feb 24; 7:05pm, Kansas 22		at Bradley	L 73–75	22–8 (11–6)	Carver Arena (9,189); Peoria, IL
Sat, Feb 27; 12:05pm		Southern Illinois	W 76–55	23–8 (12–6)	Charles Koch Arena (10,506); Wichita, KS
Missouri Valley tournament
Fri, Mar 5; 6:05pm, Valley TV/FSN	(2)	vs. (7) Missouri State; MVC Quarterfinals	W 73–63	24–8	Scottrade Center; St. Louis, MO
Sat, Mar 6; 4:05pm, Valley TV/FSN	(2)	vs. (3) Illinois State; MVC Semifinals	W 65–61	25–8	Scottrade Center (13,814); St. Louis, MO
Sun, Mar 7; 4:05pm, CBS	(2)	vs. (1) Northern Iowa; MVC Championship Game	L 52–67	25–9	Scottrade Center (9,297); St. Louis, MO
NIT
Wed, Mar 17; 7:05 p.m.	(3 VT)	(6 VT) Nevada; NIT First Round	L 70–74	25–10	Charles Koch Arena (9,112); Wichita, KS
*Non-conference game. ^{#}Rankings from AP Poll. (#) Tournament seedings in parentheses. VT=NIT Virginia Tech bracket. All times are in Central Time.
