= Isaiah Wilkerson =

American basketball player (born 1990)

Personal information
- Born: November 13, 1990 (age 36) Staten Island, New York, U.S.
- Listed height: 6 ft 3 in (1.91 m)
- Listed weight: 215 lb (98 kg)

Career information
- High school: Curtis (Staten Island, New York)
- College: NJIT (2008–2012)
- NBA draft: 2012: undrafted
- Playing career: 2012–2021
- Position: Shooting guard

Career history
- 2012–2014: Tulsa 66ers
- 2014–2015: Titánicos de León
- 2015: Atléticos de San Germán
- 2015–2017: BC Nokia
- 2017: Legia Warszawa
- 2017–2018: Lobos UAD de Mazatlán
- 2018–2019: Halcones de Ciudad Obregón
- 2019: Dorados de Chiahuahua
- 2019–2020: Centauros de Chihuahua
- 2020–2021: Dorados de Chiahuahua

Career highlights
- AP Honorable Mention All-American (2012); Great West Player of the Year (2012); 2× First-team All-Great West (2011, 2012)

Isaiah Jamal Wilkerson (born November 13, 1990) is an American former professional basketball player. He finished his U.S. collegiate career in 2011–12 as the Great West Conference Player of the Year. He became the first player from New Jersey Institute of Technology (NJIT) to win the player of the year award and only the third overall winner in Great West history.

== College career ==
Wilkerson did not enroll at NJIT immediately to play for the Highlanders. It was not until the second semester that he became a student, so his first career game on December 20, 2008, came without the benefit of having a single practice yet with the team. In 22 games that season he averaged 12.5 points and 3.5 rebounds. The following year, he scored in double figures 22 times while averaging 13.0 points and 4.9 rebounds per game. Wilkerson was named an honorable mention for the All-Great West Conference team. In his junior season in 2010–11 he once again creased his averages to 13.6 points and 6.2 rebounds per game, leading NJIT in both statistical categories, and was named All-Great West First Team. The Highlanders finished in second place with a 9–3 conference record. The following year—Wilkerson's last—saw him average career-highs of 16.2 points and 6.6 rebounds per game. The Highlanders made it to the championship game of the Great West Conference tournament but lost to North Dakota, 75 to 60. He was then named the conference player of the year. Wilkerson was also the only men's basketball player from any of the eight New Jersey NCAA Division I schools to be named to an All-American team, which the Associated Press did when he was put on the honorable mention squad.

For his career, Wilkerson scored 1,577 points and grabbed 616 rebounds; the rebounding total is the NJIT program record for their Division I era. His point total had been NJIT's all-time scoring mark in the Division I era at the time of his graduation, but the following season, former teammate Chris Flores surpassed him as the school's all-time leading scorer.

== Professional career ==
Wilkerson went undrafted in the 2012 NBA draft. On November 2, 2012, Wilkerson was selected by the Tulsa 66ers in the eighth round of the 2012 NBA D-League draft. On January 18, 2013, he was waived by the 66ers, before he was reacquired a week later. On November 1, 2013, Wilkerson was reacquired by the 66ers.

In September 2014, Wilkerson signed with Titánicos de León of Mexico for the 2014–15 season.

In 2019, Wilkerson joined the Dorados de Chiahuahua and averaged 13.2 points, 3.5 rebounds, 2.8 assists and 1.1 steals per game. Wilkerson played for the Centauros de Chihuahua of the Liga de Básquetbol Estatal de Chihuahua during the 2019–20 season. He returned to Dorados on July 29, 2020.
