= Greg Senat =

American football player (born 1994)

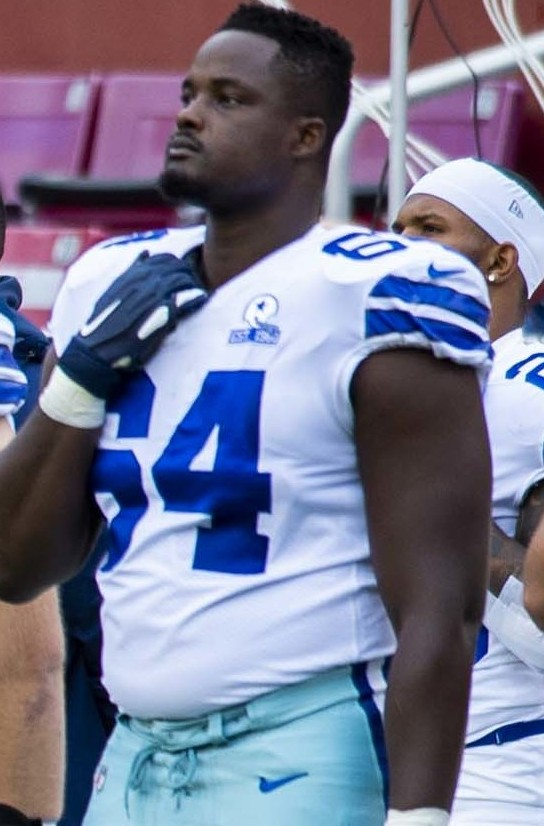
- Senat with the Dallas Cowboys in 2020

No. 64
- Position: Offensive tackle

Personal information
- Born: September 8, 1994 (age 32); Queens, New York, U.S.
- Listed height: 6 ft 6 in (1.98 m)
- Listed weight: 305 lb (138 kg)

Career information
- High school: Elmont Memorial, Marianapolis Preparatory School
- College: Wagner
- NFL draft: 2018: 6th round, 212th overall pick

Career history
- Baltimore Ravens (2018–2019); Kansas City Chiefs (2019); Cleveland Browns (2020)*; Dallas Cowboys (2020); Cleveland Browns (2021)*; Indianapolis Colts (2021); New York Jets (2021–2022)
- * Offseason or practice squad member only

Awards and highlights
- Super Bowl champion (LIV)

Career NFL statistics
- Games played: 10
- Stats at Pro Football Reference

Gregory Senat (born September 8, 1994) is an American former professional football player who was an offensive tackle in the National Football League (NFL). He played college football for the Wagner Seahawks.

== Early life ==
Senat attended Elmont Memorial High School, where his main sport was basketball. He played his last two years on the junior varsity football team as a tight end. He also practiced lacrosse from 7 to 10th grade.

After his junior year, he enrolled at Marianapolis Preparatory School in the NEPSAC conference to receive more exposure from college recruiters and focus on his first love basketball.

== College career ==
Senat accepted a basketball scholarship from Wagner College. He played as a power forward for 4 seasons. As a senior in 2016, he contributed to the team winning the Northeast Conference regular season basketball championship, having a 23-11 record and the school's first-ever postseason victory, in the first round of the National Invitation Tournament against St. Bonaventure University.

As a senior in 2016, he joined the football team. His size and athletic ability at the Football Championship Subdivision level, allowed him to start all 22 games at right tackle in two seasons. He participated in the East-West Shrine All-Star Football Game, becoming the first player from a Northeast Conference school to do so.

== Professional career ==
=== Baltimore Ravens ===
Senat was selected by the Baltimore Ravens in the sixth round (212th overall) of the 2018 NFL draft. He was placed on injured reserve on August 31, 2018 after having foot surgery.

On September 14, 2019, Senat was waived by the Ravens.

=== Kansas City Chiefs ===
On September 16, 2019, Senat was claimed off waivers by the Kansas City Chiefs. The Chiefs placed him on injured reserve on November 2, 2019. That season, the Chiefs went on to win Super Bowl LIV. He was waived on September 5, 2020.

=== Cleveland Browns (first stint) ===
Senat was signed to the practice squad of the Cleveland Browns on September 8, 2020.

=== Dallas Cowboys ===
On October 6, 2020, Senat was signed by the Dallas Cowboys off the Browns practice squad. He appeared in 10 games, playing on the special teams units.

=== Cleveland Browns (second stint) ===
On March 19, 2021, Senat signed with the Browns on a one-year deal. He was placed on injured reserve on August 31, 2021 with a knee injury. He was waived off the injured reserve list on September 9, 2021.

=== Indianapolis Colts ===
On October 12, 2021, Senat was signed to the Indianapolis Colts practice squad. He was promoted to the active roster on December 28, but was waived four days later.

=== New York Jets ===
On January 3, 2022, Senat was claimed off waivers by the New York Jets. On April 5, 2022, Senat re-signed with the Jets.

He was placed on the reserve/non-football injury list on July 21, 2022, ending his season. He was released on August 28, 2023.

== Personal life ==
Senat is of Haitian descent. He supports the Hope for Haiti charity.
