= 2009–10 Drake Bulldogs men's basketball team =

American college basketball season

2009–10 Drake Bulldogs men's basketball
- Conference: Missouri Valley Conference
- Record: 14–19 (7–11 MVC)
- Head coach: Mark Phelps
- Assistant coaches: Mike Gibson; Kareem Richardson; Justin Ohl
- Home arena: Knapp Center

2009–10 Missouri Valley Conference men's basketball standings
	Conf.				Overall
Team	W		L	PCT	W		L	PCT
Northern Iowa †	15	–	3	.833	30	–	5	.857
Wichita State	12	–	6	.667	25	–	10	.714
Illinois State	11	–	7	.611	22	–	11	.667
Creighton	10	–	8	.556	18	–	16	.529
Bradley	9	–	9	.500	16	–	15	.516
Indiana State	9	–	9	.500	17	–	15	.531
Missouri State	8	–	10	.444	24	–	12	.667
Drake	7	–	11	.389	14	–	19	.424
Southern Illinois	6	–	12	.333	15	–	15	.500
Evansville	3	–	15	.167	9	–	21	.300
† 2010 MVC tournament winner As of March 20, 2010; Rankings from AP Poll

The 2009–10 Drake Bulldogs men's basketball team represented Drake University during the 2009-10 NCAA Division I men's basketball season. The team, which plays in the Missouri Valley Conference (MVC), was led by second-year head coach Mark Phelps and played their home games at the Knapp Center. The Bulldogs finished the season 14–19, 7–11 in MVC play. They lost in the quarterfinals of the 2010 Missouri Valley Conference men's basketball tournament to Northern Iowa.

== Roster ==
Note: Flags indicate national team eligibility at FIBA sanctioned events. Players may hold other non-FIBA nationality not displayed.

No.		Position	Player
1	(United States)	F	Jordan Clarke
2	(United States)	F	Aaron Hawley
3	(United States)	G	Craig Stanley
10	(United States)	G	Ryan Wedel
13	(Luxembourg)	G	Frank Wiseler
20	(United States)	G	Josh Young
21	(United States)	F	Corey Parker
22	(United States)	F	Bill Eaddy

No.		Position	Player
23	(United States)	G	Sean Duff
25	(United States)	G	David Smith
31	(United States)	C	Sean Jones
32	(United States)	F	Greg Whitaker
34	(United States)	F	Ben Simons
40	(United States)	F	Reece Uhlenhopp
44	(United States)	G/F	Adam Templeton
45	(United States)	C	Seth VanDeest

== Preseason ==
The team lost Josh Parker, who transferred to Dayton. Tyson Dirks is no longer on the roster.

== Schedule ==
Date time, TV	Rank^{#}	Opponent^{#}	Result	Record	Site (attendance) city, state
Exhibition
11/07/09*; 7:05 p.m., Mediacom		Upper Iowa	W 74–58	—	Knapp Center (3,662); Des Moines, IA
Regular season
11/14/09*; 1:05 p.m., Mediacom		IUPUI; Glen Wilkes Classic	W 88–82	0–1	Knapp Center (3,344); Des Moines, IA
11/17/09*; 7:05 p.m., Mediacom		Iowa State	W 90–70	0–2	Knapp Center (6,157); Des Moines, IA
11/20/09*; 12:15 p.m., Metro Sports		vs. Georgia State; Glen Wilkes Classic	W 65–58	1–2	Ocean Center (325); Daytona Beach, FL
11/21/09*; 12:15 p.m., Metro Sports		vs. Akron; Glen Wilkes Classic	W 63–59	1–3	Ocean Center (321); Daytona Beach, FL
11/22/09*; 2:30 p.m., Metro Sports		vs. UCF; Glen Wilkes Classic	W 59–50	1–4	Ocean Center (1,015); Daytona Beach, FL
11/28/09*; 7:00 p.m., Metro Sports		at Austin Peay	W 78–72	2–4	Dave Aaron Arena (2,107); Clarksville, TN
12/4/09*; 7:30 p.m., Mediacom		SIU Edwardsville; Drake Hy-Vee Classic	W 60–58	2–5	Knapp Center (4,016); Des Moines, IA
12/5/09*; 7:30 p.m., Mediacom		North Dakota; Drake Hy-Vee Classic	W 72–63	3–5	Knapp Center (4,152); Des Moines, IA
12/11/09*; 7:05 p.m., Mediacom		South Dakota; Drake Invitational	W 96–81	4–5	Knapp Center (3,170); Des Moines, IA
12/12/09*; 5:05 p.m., Mediacom		Binghamton; Drake Invitational	W 77–76	5–5	Knapp Center (3,065); Des Moines, IA
12/19/09*; 5:35 p.m., BTN		at Iowa	W 71–67	5–6	Carver-Hawkeye Arena (9,921); Iowa City, IA
12/22/09*; 8:05 p.m., Metro Sports		San Diego State; MWC–MVC Challenge	W 76–73 ^{OT}	5–7	Knapp Center (4,012); Des Moines, IA
12/29/09; 7:05 p.m., Mediacom		Bradley	W 67–59	5–8 (0–1)	Knapp Center (3,791); Des Moines, IA
1/1/10; 7:05 p.m., Metro Sports		at Wichita State	W 61–38	5–9 (0–2)	Charles Koch Arena (10,506); Wichita, KS
1/3/10; 6:05 p.m., Mediacom		Indiana State	W 60–46	5–10 (0–3)	Knapp Center (3,924); Des Moines, IA
1/6/10; 7:05 p.m., CBSCS		at Creighton	W 73–69	5–11 (0–4)	Qwest Center Omaha (14,956); Omaha, NE
1/9/10; 6:35 p.m., FSN		at Southern Illinois	W 70–65	6–11 (1–4)	SIU Arena (4,359); Carbondale, IL
1/12/10; 7:05 p.m., Mediacom		Missouri State	W 88–77	7–11 (2–4)	Knapp Center (3,258); Des Moines, IA
1/17/10; 7:05 p.m., ESPNU		Illinois State	W 69–59	8–11 (3–4)	Knapp Center (4,273); Des Moines, IA
1/20/10; 7:05 p.m., Metro Sports		at Evansville	W 72–65	9–11 (4–4)	Roberts Stadium (4,169); Evansville, IN
1/23/10; 1:05 p.m., FSN		Wichita State	W 78–64	10–11 (5–4)	Knapp Center (4,826); Des Moines, IA
1/27/10; 7:05 p.m., Mediacom		at Northern Iowa	W 67–51	10–12 (5–5)	McLeod Center (6,069); Cedar Falls, IA
1/30/10; 7:05 p.m., Mediacom		Creighton	W 79–74	11–12 (6–5)	Knapp Center (7,018); Des Moines, IA
2/2/10; 7:05 p.m., Metro Sports		at Bradley	W 67–65	11–13 (6–6)	Carver Arena (8,670); Peoria, IL
2/6/10; 7:05 p.m., Metro Sports		at Illinois State	W 71–68	11–14 (6–7)	Redbird Arena (8,291); Normal, IL
2/10/10; 7:05 p.m., Mediacom		No. 19 Northern Iowa	W 57–48	11–15 (6–8)	Knapp Center (7,152); Des Moines, IA
2/13/10; 1:00 p.m., Metro Sports		at Indiana State	W 76–66	11–16 (6–9)	Hulman Center (5,127); Terre Haute, IN
2/16/10; 7:05 p.m., Mediacom		Southern Illinois	W 79–72	12–16 (7–9)	Knapp Center (3,925); Des Moines, IA
2/20/10*; 9:00 p.m.		at @ Cal State Northridge; ESPN BracketBusters	W 90–80	13–16	Matadome (1,252); Northridge, CA
2/24/10; 7:05 p.m., Mediacom		at Missouri State	W 75–59	13–17 (7–10)	JQH Arena (7,951); Springfield, MO
2/27/10; 4:05 p.m., Mediacom		Evansville	W 56–53	13–18 (7–11)	Knapp Center (6,073); Des Moines, IA
Missouri Valley tournament
3/4/2010; 6:05 p.m., FSN	(8)	vs. (9) Southern Illinois; MVC First Round	W 63–61	14–18	Scottrade Center (17,490); St. Louis, MO
3/5/2010; 12:05 p.m., FSN	(8)	vs. (1) Northern Iowa; MVC Quarterfinals	L 40–55	14–19	Scottrade Center (19,250); St. Louis, MO
*Non-conference game. ^{#}Rankings from AP Poll. (#) Tournament seedings in parentheses. All times are in Central Standard Time.
