= Ben Jacobson =

American basketball coach (born 1970)

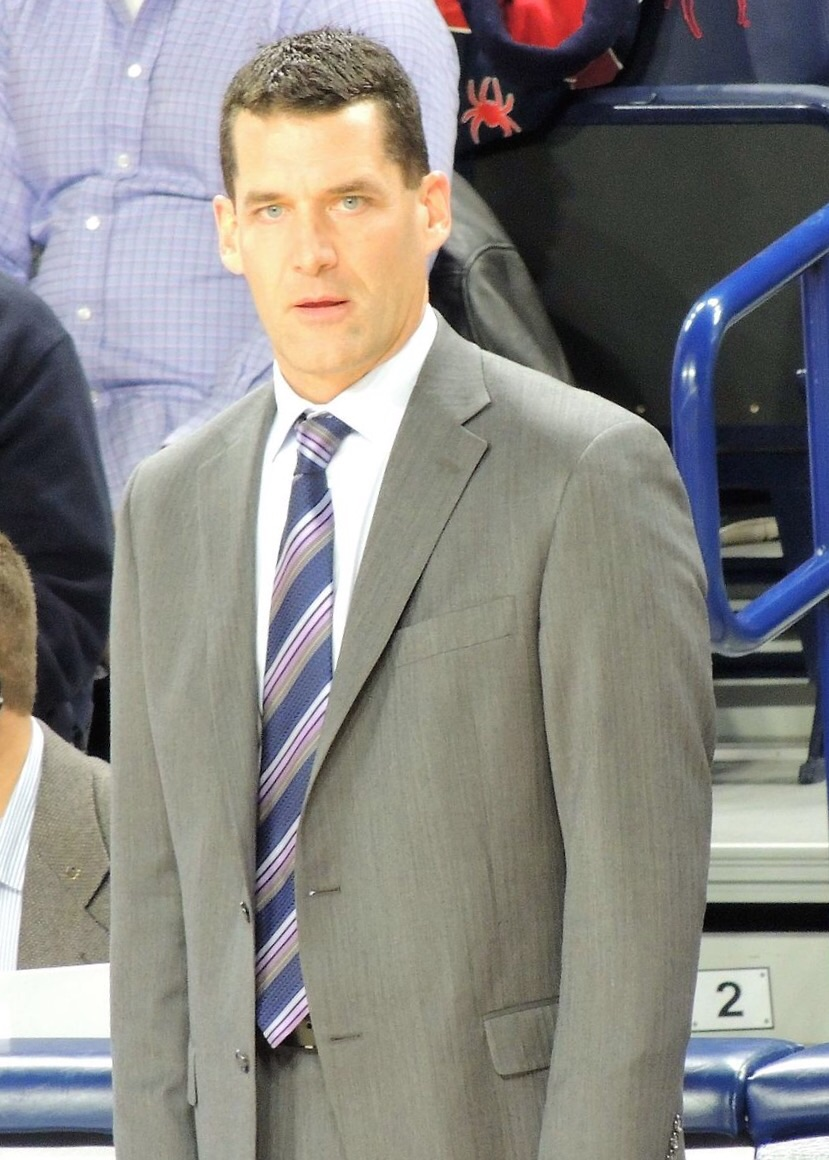
- Jacobson in 2015

Current position
- Title: Head coach
- Team: Utah State
- Conference: Pac-12
- Record: 0–0 (–)

Biographical details
- Born: December 16, 1970 (age 55); Mayville, North Dakota, U.S.

Playing career
- 1989–1993: North Dakota
- Position: Guard

Coaching career (HC unless noted)
- 1993–2000: North Dakota (assistant)
- 2000–2001: North Dakota State (assistant)
- 2001–2006: Northern Iowa (assistant)
- 2006–2026: Northern Iowa
- 2026–present: Utah State

Head coaching record
- Overall: 397–259 (.605)
- Tournaments: 4–5 (NCAA Division I); 2–3 (NIT); 4–2 (CIT)

Accomplishments and honors

Championships
- 4 MVC regular season (2009, 2010, 2020, 2022); 5 MVC tournament (2009, 2010, 2015, 2016, 2026)

Awards
- 5× MVC Coach of the Year (2009, 2010, 2015, 2020, 2022); Co-North Dakota Mr. Basketball (1989)

Ben Scott Jacobson (born December 16, 1970) is an American basketball coach. He is the head men's basketball coach at Utah State University, a position he has held since 2026. He previously served as the head coach at University of Northern Iowa from 2006 to 2026. He served as an assistant at North Dakota, North Dakota State, and Northern Iowa.

== Playing career ==
Jacobson attended Mayville-Portland High School. After his senior year he was named 1989's North Dakota Mr. Basketball. Jacobson went on to play collegiately at the University of North Dakota from 1989 to 1993. He was a four-year letterman for the Sioux, a two-year starter, and he ended his career as the school's all-time assist leader. UND made two Division 2 Elite Eight appearances and four regional appearances, along with winning two conference championships, during his career. He was team captain in 1991–92 and 1992–93, was named to the NCC's All-Academic Team in 1993, and was a player representative to UND's letterwinners association from 1991 to 1993.

== Coaching career ==
Jacobson's biggest coaching accomplishment was in 2009–10, when the Panthers made a run into the Sweet Sixteen of the NCAA tournament highlighted by an upset of top national seed Kansas. ESPN.com columnist Pat Forde called the Panthers' win "the biggest tourney upset in years," and called the clinching shot by Panthers guard Ali Farokhmanesh "the greatest early-round shot in NCAA tournament history."

In March 2010, Jacobson signed a 10-year extension with UNI. The contract guarantees the coach $450,000 a year with annual increases of $25,000 through the length of the contract.

In the 2010–11 season, Jacobson led the Panthers to their eighth consecutive 18-plus win season, third straight postseason bid and a Valley-leading third straight 20-plus win season.

Prior to that stretch of eight straight seasons, UNI had tallied only six 18-plus win seasons in the history of its program.

Jacobson also coached UNI as it became the first college program ever to represent the United States of America at an international basketball competition. In August 2007, UNI was chosen to be Team USA at the World University Games in Bangkok, Thailand. Donning the Red, White and Blue, UNI went 5–1 in the tournament, losing only to eventual gold medalist Lithuania, while posting wins over Angola, Turkey, China, Finland and Israel.

Jacobson finished his first campaign at the helm of UNI with an 18–13 record. The 18 wins were the most for a first-year Panther head coach since the team joined the Division I ranks in 1980. In addition, UNI posted wins over Iowa State and Iowa – sweeping the Cyclones and Hawkeyes in the same season for just the second time ever – including posting a win in Iowa City for the first time in program history.

Before taking over as head coach, Jacobson was the Panthers' top assistant coach starting in 2001, and was a key cog in bringing the Panthers from the basement of the Missouri Valley Conference to the penthouse. With Jacobson on staff, the development of UNI basketball had been remarkable.

UNI has also advanced to the NCAA tournament eight times (2004, 2005, 2006, 2009, 2010, 2015, 2016, and 2026), including receiving two at-large bids. UNI also achieved its first-ever Division I top-25 ranking during the 2005–06 season.

On November 15, 2014, Jacobson became the all-time win leader for a coach in UNI Men's basketball history. After recording a win over his alma mater North Dakota, he would notch his 167th UNI victory.

In the 2014–15 season, Jacobson led the Panthers to their highest ranking in school history (No. 10) in the AP and (No. 9) in the Coaches Poll. UNI also in that season achieved the most wins in the school's history with 31. After that season Jacobson, was given a 10-year extension with an average of $900,000 per year through 2024–25.

On November 21, 2015, Jacobson led UNI to a victory over No. 1 North Carolina. The win was one of the biggest in program history and came in just the first meeting of the two basketball programs. The Panthers are 2–0 versus AP No. 1 ranked teams in program history. Just four days later the coach hit another career milestone. After defeating the University of Dubuque in convincing fashion, the coach recorded his 200th victory at the university. Nearly three weeks after achieving the 200th victory, UNI stunned No. 5 ranked Iowa State in the Big Four Classic in Des Moines. On March 6, 2016, UNI won its fourth MVC tournament under Jacobson.

In the first round of the MVC tournament, Jacobson notched his 250th UNI career win against Evansville on March 1, 2018.

On March 5, 2020, Jacobson was named MVC coach of the year.

On February 27, 2021, Jacobson earned his 300th career UNI victory with a double overtime win over Illinois State in the regular season finale.

On March 3, 2022, Jacobson was named the MVC coach of the year for the 5th time. The award gave Jacobson the most coach of the year award honors of any coach in the history of the 115-year history of Missouri Valley Conference.

Jacobson became the all-time conference wins leader (188) in Missouri Valley Conference history on January 20, 2024, with a victory over rival Southern Illinois.

On March 30, 2026, Jacobson was announced as the new head coach for Utah State after twenty seasons in Cedar Falls.

== Head coaching record ==
Record table
Season	Team	Overall	Conference	Standing	Postseason
Northern Iowa Panthers (Missouri Valley Conference) (2006–2026)
2006–07	Northern Iowa	18–13	9–9	5th	
2007–08	Northern Iowa	18–14	9–9	T–5th	
2008–09	Northern Iowa	23–11	14–4	T–1st	NCAA Division I Round of 64
2009–10	Northern Iowa	30–5	15–3	1st	NCAA Division I Sweet 16
2010–11	Northern Iowa	20–14	10–8	T–4th	CIT Quarterfinal
2011–12	Northern Iowa	20–14	9–9	T–3rd	NIT Second Round
2012–13	Northern Iowa	21–15	11–7	3rd	CIT Semifinal
2013–14	Northern Iowa	16–15	10–8	3rd	
2014–15	Northern Iowa	31–4	16–2	2nd	NCAA Division I Round of 32
2015–16	Northern Iowa	23–13	11–7	T–4th	NCAA Division I Round of 32
2016–17	Northern Iowa	14–16	9–9	T–3rd	
2017–18	Northern Iowa	16–16	7–11	T–7th	
2018–19	Northern Iowa	16–18	9–9	5th	
2019–20	Northern Iowa	25–6	14–4	1st	No postseason held
2020–21	Northern Iowa	10–15	7–11	T–5th	
2021–22	Northern Iowa	20–12	14–4	1st	NIT Second Round
2022–23	Northern Iowa	14–18	9–11	8th	
2023–24	Northern Iowa	19–14	12–8	T–4th	
2024–25	Northern Iowa	20–13	14–6	3rd	NIT First Round
2025–26	Northern Iowa	23–13	11–9	T–6th	NCAA Division I Round of 64
Northern Iowa:		397–259 (.605)	220–148 (.598)		
Utah State Aggies (Pac-12) (2026–present)
2026–27	Utah State	0–0	0–0		
Utah State:		0–0 (–)	0–0 (–)		
Total:		397–259 (.605)			
National champion Postseason invitational champion Conference regular season champion Conference regular season and conference tournament champion Division regular season champion Division regular season and conference tournament champion Conference tournament champion
