= Isiah Williams (basketball) =

American basketball player

Personal information
- Listed height: 6 ft 1 in (1.85 m)
- Listed weight: 190 lb (86 kg)

Career information
- High school: Farragut (Chicago, Illinois)
- College: USU Eastern (2008–2010); Utah Valley (2010–2012)
- NBA draft: 2012: undrafted
- Position: Point guard
- Number: 2

Career highlights
- Great West Player of the Year (2011); AP Honorable mention All-American (2011)

Isiah Williams is an American former college basketball player for Utah Valley University. Williams was the Great West Conference player of the year in 2011 and UVU's first division I All-American in basketball.

Williams, a 6'1" guard from Farragut High School in Chicago, Illinois, played two years of junior college ball at the College of Eastern Utah, where he led the Golden Eagles to a third-place finish in the 2010 NJCAA Men's Division I Basketball Championship. He then moved to Utah Valley University to play for Dick Hunsaker and complete his four-year degree.

In his junior season of 2010–11, Williams averaged 17.4 points and 1.8 assists per game as he led the Wolverines to an 11–1 finish and a Great West Conference regular-season championship. Williams was named first team All-Conference and Conference player of the year. At the conclusion of the season, Williams was named an Associated Press honorable mention All-American, making him the first player in school history to receive such an honor.
