= Ike Azotam =

Nigerian-American basketball player

Toronto Raptors
- Title: Head video coordinator / player development coach
- League: NBA

Personal information
- Born: January 14, 1991 (age 35) Boston, Massachusetts, U.S.
- Listed height: 6 ft 7 in (2.01 m)
- Listed weight: 239 lb (108 kg)

Career information
- High school: John D. O'Bryant (Boston, Massachusetts); Marianapolis Prep (Thompson, Connecticut)
- College: Quinnipiac (2010–2014)
- NBA draft: 2014: undrafted
- Playing career: 2014–2015
- Position: Power forward

Career history
- 2014–2015: Marín Peixegalego

Career highlights
- First-team All-MAAC (2014); 2× Second-team All-NEC (2012, 2013)

Ikechukwu "Ike" Azotam (born January 14, 1991) is a Nigerian-American former professional basketball player who is the head video coordinator and a player development coach for the Toronto Raptors of the National Basketball Association (NBA). He played college basketball for the Quinnipiac Bobcats for four seasons and earned all-conference recognition on three occasions. Azotam attended the John D. O'Bryant School of Mathematics & Science and Marianapolis Preparatory School for high school and was named New England All-Star in his final two seasons. He played as a power forward.

== Early life ==
Azotam was born on January 14, 1991, in Boston, Massachusetts, as the youngest of four children of Ada and Bennet Azotam. He has two brothers, Dozie and Uchenna, and a sister, Adaorah. Azotam's parents both moved from Nigeria to the United States at about 20 years old for a better life. Dozie played American football for the Georgetown Hoyas and is a member of the school's African-American Advisory Board (AAAB). Unchenna and Adaorah attended Georgetown as well, leading Ike to consider joining the same school. The family lived on the south end of Roxbury, a neighborhood in Boston, on 1350 Tremont St. Their house was located very close to the Reggie Lewis Track and Athletic Center.

Ike began playing basketball in fifth grade, but began taking it more seriously once he went through a growth spurt heading into ninth grade. Growing up, he often walked from his home to a nearby YMCA facility to practice. Azotam supposedly made his first slam dunk his first at the age of 15, a moment that he would remember for the rest of his life. Despite repeatedly performed the same move, but failed to do so when he called his friends to watch him. However, in the summer, he grew four inches and was eventually able to consistently dunk the ball. Azotam also liked to play with Dozie, who was seven years older and playing college football at around the same time. His mother said, "You would have to ask him to take out the trash, clean the dishes and clean his room, but you never had to ask him to play basketball."

Throughout his childhood, Ike was closest to his eldest brother Dozie. The two went to the local YMCA each time Dozie visited home from college, a tradition. Dozie said, "It just became a habit...Family comes first." Ike turned to Steve Ekechuku to fine tune his game. None of Ike's siblings stand above 6 ft 1 in (1.85 m) and his mother is even shorter. However, his uncles and cousins are far taller, ranging from 6 ft 6 in (1.98 m) to 6 ft 8 in (2.03 m). Ike himself has a height of 6 ft 7 in (2.01 m) and stood 6 ft 6 (1.98 m) as a high school senior.

== High school career ==
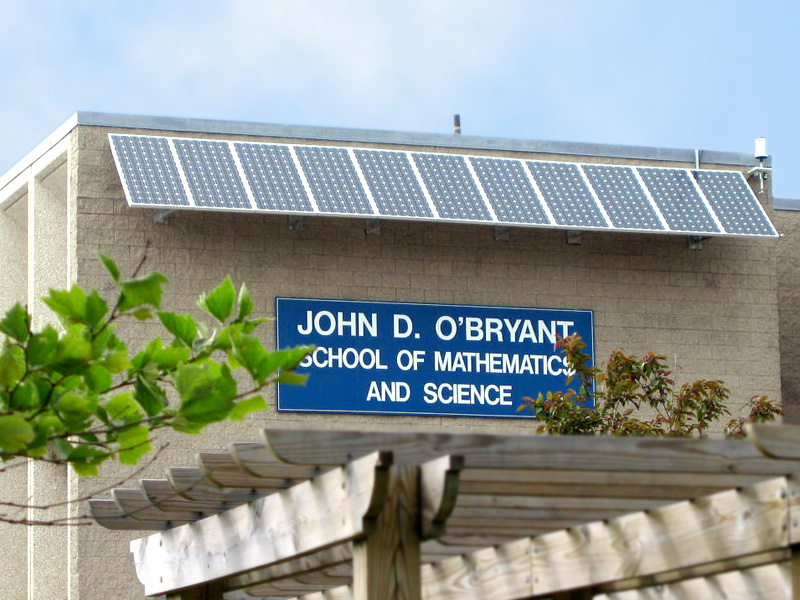
Azotam attended the John D. O'Bryant School of Mathematics & Science (pictured) for three years.

Azotam first played high school basketball with John D. O'Bryant School of Mathematics & Science in the neighborhood of Roxbury in Boston. He came in as a freshman with very little experience in organized basketball and O'Bryant head coach Juan Figueroa praised him for his athleticism but considered him very raw, primarily on the defensive end. However, he rapidly improved within the next three years. On March 2, 2007, as a sophomore, Azotam recorded 18 points and 9 rebounds. He had two offensive rebounds in the final two minutes of the game, but North Attleborough High School pulled off the upset win. By the end of his sophomore season, he was averaging 16.5 points and 9.5 rebounds per game. In his junior season, on January 12, 2009, Azotam was one of seven Players of the Week in boys' basketball named by Boston.com after scoring a total of 40 points and 34 rebounds in wins over Boston English and West Roxbury High School. Later that year, on February 21, John O'Bryant was defeated by Madison Park Technical Vocational High School at the Boston City League championship game despite having Azotam put up a double-double of 16 points and 20 rebounds. Following his third season at O'Bryant, after which they finished 18–6, Azotam earned New England All-Star and Massachusetts All-Scholastic recognition. He decided to attend Marianapolis Preparatory School in Thompson, Connecticut, as a senior to help secure an NCAA Division I scholarship in the near future. By the end of his season with Marianapolis Prep, he was averaging 19.3 points, 10.3 rebounds, 5.2 assists, and 2.1 blocks, leading the team to second place at the NEPSAC championship. The Golden Knights finished with a record of 21–9.

== College career ==
Azotam played collegiately for the Quinnipiac Bobcats from 2010 to 2014. He was twice named to the Second-team All–NEC in 2012 and 2013. Azotam was a First-team All–MAAC selection in his senior year in 2014.

== Professional career ==
In September 2014, Azotam signed his first professional contract with Marín Peixegalego of the LEB Plata, the second-best basketball league in Spain behind the ACB. The team was coming off a 9–15 season, in which they failed to qualify for the playoffs. He made his debut on October 5 against Azpeitia, scoring 22 points and adding 7 rebounds and 2 steals. In his next game, on October 11, Azotam recorded his first double-double, with 19 points and 13 rebounds vs Canarias Basketball Academy. He followed up by notching a season-high 24 points on Xuventude Baloncesto. Azotam had another notable performance on November 30, when he scored 19 points and grabbed 10 rebounds against FC Barcelona Bàsquet B. Azotam led Marín in points, rebounds, field goal percentage and minutes through February 17, 2015, when he was named LEB Plata Player of the Week. By the end of the season, he was averaging 13.9 points and 6.6 rebounds and making over 55% of his shots.

On October 29, 2015, Azotam inked with the Island Storm of the National Basketball League of Canada (NBL). He claimed that he wanted to play with the team because the Storm were historically successful in the NBL Canada. Head coach Joe Salerno said, "Ike is a tough, hard nose, physical player, who has a great mid-range game and isn't scared to mix it up a bit in the paint." Salerno also believed that Azotam would have an even more successful second season in professional basketball. Azotam returned home for a personal matter before playing a game for the team.

Azotam returned to Spain in December 2015, after signing with Leyma Básquet Coruña of the LEB Oro. Doctors detected an irregular heartbeat during his physical with the team and failed to clear him to play.

== Post-playing career ==
Azotam served as a graduate manager for the Texas Longhorns during the 2016–17 season.

On November 25, 2020, Azotam was announced as an assistant video coordinator for the New York Knicks of the National Basketball Association (NBA).

On August 22, 2023, Azotam was sued by the New York Knicks in the U.S. District Court in Manhattan. The Knicks state that Ikechukwu Azotam, who worked for the Knicks from 2020 to 2023, sent the Raptors thousands of confidential files—including play frequency reports, a prep book for the 2022-23 season, video scouting files, opposition research and more—after the team began recruiting him to join their organization in summer 2023. The lawsuit alleged that Azotam "illegally shared 3,358 video files" and that "the stolen files were accessed over 2,000 times by the Raptors." The files were accessed from a Google email account that Azotam maintained.
