= 2010 CollegeInsider.com Postseason Tournament =

- Teams: 16
- Finals site: JQH Arena, Springfield, Missouri
- Champions: Missouri State (1st title)
- Runner-up: Pacific (1st title game)
- Semifinalists: Appalachian State (1st semifinal); Creighton (1st semifinal)
- Winning coach: Cuonzo Martin (1st title)
- MVP: Will Creekmore (Missouri State)

The 2010 CollegeInsider.com Postseason Tournament (CIT) was a postseason single-elimination tournament of 16 National Collegiate Athletic Association (NCAA) Division I teams.

Fifteen of the selected teams were from a pool that are not invited to the 2010 NCAA Men's Division I Basketball Tournament or the 2010 National Invitation Tournament. The 16th team was South Dakota, the champion of the 2010 Great West Conference men's basketball tournament.

The tournament began with first-round games March 16–18, 2010. Quarterfinal action continued on campus sites on March 22, and the tournament concluded with the championship game on March 30. The Appalachian State–Pacific game was delayed one day to Thursday, March 25, due to Pacific being snowed in at the airport after the Northern Colorado game.

== Participating teams ==
The following teams received an invitation to the 2010 CIT:

School	Conference	Overall record	Conference record
Appalachian State	Southern	22–12	13–5
Creighton	Missouri Valley	16–15	10–8
Fairfield	Metro Atlantic Athletic	22–10	13–5
George Mason	Colonial Athletic	17–14	12–6
Harvard	Ivy League	21–7	10–4
Louisiana Tech	Western Athletic	23–10	9–7
Loyola Marymount	West Coast	18–15	7–7
Marshall	Conference USA	23–9	11–5
Middle Tennessee	Sun Belt	19–13	13–5
Missouri State	Missouri Valley	20–12	8–10
Northern Colorado	Big Sky	24–7	12–4
Pacific	Big West	20–11	12–4
Portland	West Coast	21–10	10–4
South Dakota	Great West	22–9	11–1
Southern Miss	Conference USA	20–13	8–8
Western Carolina	Southern	22–11	11–7

== Bracket ==
Bracket is for visual purposes only. The CIT does not have a set bracket.

First round March 16–18
Pacific	86
Loyola Marymount	76
Portland	73
Northern Colorado	81
Harvard	71
Appalachian State	93
Western Carolina	88
Marshall	90
Fairfield	101*
George Mason	96
South Dakota	78
Creighton	89
Southern Miss	57
Louisiana Tech	66
Middle Tennessee	79
Missouri State	87

Quarterfinals; March 22
Pacific	63
Northern Colorado	59
Appalachian State	80
Marshall	72
Fairfield	55
Creighton	73
Louisiana Tech	40
Missouri State	69

Semifinals; March 24–25
Pacific	64
Appalachian State	56
Creighton	61
Missouri State	67

Championship; March 30
Pacific	65
Missouri State	78

Home teams listed second.
* Denotes overtime period.
