= 2009–10 Indiana State Sycamores men's basketball team =

American college basketball season

2009–10 Indiana State Sycamores men's basketball

CBI, First round
- Conference: Missouri Valley Conference
- Record: 17–15 (9–9 MVC)
- Head coach: Kevin McKenna (3rd season)
- Associate head coach: Greg Lansing (3rd season)
- Assistant coaches: Lou Gudino (3rd season); Deryl Cunningham (2nd season)
- Home arena: Hulman Center

2009–10 Missouri Valley Conference men's basketball standings
	Conf.				Overall
Team	W		L	PCT	W		L	PCT
Northern Iowa †	15	–	3	.833	30	–	5	.857
Wichita State	12	–	6	.667	25	–	10	.714
Illinois State	11	–	7	.611	22	–	11	.667
Creighton	10	–	8	.556	18	–	16	.529
Bradley	9	–	9	.500	16	–	15	.516
Indiana State	9	–	9	.500	17	–	15	.531
Missouri State	8	–	10	.444	24	–	12	.667
Drake	7	–	11	.389	14	–	19	.424
Southern Illinois	6	–	12	.333	15	–	15	.500
Evansville	3	–	15	.167	9	–	21	.300
† 2010 MVC tournament winner As of March 20, 2010; Rankings from AP Poll

The 2009–10 Indiana State Sycamores men's basketball team represented Indiana State University in the 2009–10 NCAA Division I men's basketball season. The Sycamores were led by head coach Kevin McKenna in his third year leading the team. Indiana State played their home games at the Hulman Center in Terre Haute, Indiana, as members of the America East Conference.

The Sycamores finished conference play with a 9–9 record, earning the sixth seed in the Missouri Valley tournament. Indiana State lost in the quarterfinals of the MVC tournament to Illinois.

Indiana State failed to qualify for the NCAA tournament, but were invited to the 2010 College Basketball Invitational. The Sycamores were eliminated in the first round of the CBI by Saint Louis, 63–54.

After the season, McKenna resigned as Indiana State's head coach to join Dana Altman's staff at Oregon as an assistant coach. Associate head coach Greg Lansing was promoted to head coach shortly thereafter.

The Sycamores finished the season with a 17–15 record.

== Roster ==
2009–10 Indiana State Sycamores men's basketball team
Players
Coaches

Pos.	#	Name	Height	Weight	Year	Hometown
C	0	Brant Leitnaker	6 ft 10 in (2.08 m)	235 lb (107 kg)	Jr	Lancaster, Ohio
F	1	Koang Doluony	6 ft 7 in (2.01 m)	190 lb (86 kg)	RS Fr	Omaha, Nebraska
G	2	Lucas Eitel	6 ft 4 in (1.93 m)	175 lb (79 kg)	Fr	Marshall, Illinois
G	3	Rashad Reed	6 ft 1 in (1.85 m)	200 lb (91 kg)	Sr	Mansfield, Ohio
C	5	Josh Crawford	6 ft 11 in (2.11 m)	220 lb (100 kg)	Sr	Long Beach, California
G	10	Logan Eitel	6 ft 4 in (1.93 m)	185 lb (84 kg)	Fr	Marshall, Illinois
G	13	Jake Odum	6 ft 4 in (1.93 m)	170 lb (77 kg)	Fr	Terre Haute, Indiana
G	20	Dwayne Lathan	6 ft 3 in (1.91 m)	190 lb (86 kg)	So	Chatham, Louisiana
F/C	21	Isiah Martin	6 ft 8 in (2.03 m)	210 lb (95 kg)	Jr	Chicago, Illinois
G	23	Harry Marshall	6 ft 0 in (1.83 m)	190 lb (86 kg)	Sr	Bowling Green, Indiana
G	24	Jordan Printy	6 ft 4 in (1.93 m)	180 lb (82 kg)	So	Marion, Iowa
F	31	RJ Mahurin	6 ft 8 in (2.03 m)	210 lb (95 kg)	Fr	Rockville, Indiana
G	32	Aaron Carter	6 ft 4 in (1.93 m)	195 lb (88 kg)	Jr	Cannelton, Indiana
G/F	34	Carl Richard	6 ft 4 in (1.93 m)	200 lb (91 kg)	So	Chicago, Illinois
G	44	Jake Kelly	6 ft 6 in (1.98 m)	185 lb (84 kg)	Jr	Carmel, Indiana

Head coach

- Kevin McKenna (Creighton)

Assistant coach(es)

- Greg Lansing (South Dakota)
- Lou Gudino (Indiana)
- Deryl Cunningham (Kansas State)

Legend

- (C) Team captain
- (S) Suspended
- (I) Ineligible
- (W) Walk-on
- Injured
- Current redshirt

Roster
Last update: February 13, 2023

== Schedule and results ==
Date time, TV	Rank^{#}	Opponent^{#}	Result	Record	Site (attendance) city, state
Exhibition
November 3, 2009*; 7:05 pm		Rose–Hulman	W 89–50	—	Hulman Center; Terre Haute, IN
November 7, 2009*; 2:05 pm		Indianapolis	W 89–50	—	Hulman Center; Terre Haute, IN
Regular season
November 13, 2009*; 7:05 pm		Nebraska–Kearney	W 88–58	1–0	Hulman Center (4,484); Terre Haute, IN
November 16, 2009*; 8:00 pm		at LSU; NIT Season Tip-Off	L 45–56	1–1	Pete Maravich Assembly Center (8,113); Baton Rouge, LA
November 17, 2009*; 5:30 pm		vs. Milwaukee; NIT Season Tip-Off	W 76–63	2–1	Pete Maravich Assembly Center (8,220); Baton Rouge, LA
November 20, 2009*; 7:05 pm		Colorado State; MWC–MVC Challenge	W 65–60	3–1	Hulman Center (4,308); Terre Haute, IN
November 23, 2009*; 5:30 pm		vs. Coastal Carolina; NIT Season Tip-Off	L 62–77	3–2	E. A. Diddle Arena (2,127); Bowling Green, KY
November 24, 2009*; 8:00 pm		at Western Kentucky; NIT Season Tip-Off	W 64–63	4–2	E. A. Diddle Arena (2,269); Bowling Green, KY
November 29, 2009*; 3:05 pm		at Arkansas State	W 77–72	5–2	Convocation Center (2,436); Jonesboro, AR
December 9, 2009*; 8:05 pm		Ball State	L 63–68	5–3	Hulman Center (7,144); Terre Haute, IN
December 13, 2009*; 2:05 pm		Oral Roberts	W 60–54	6–3	Hulman Center (3,357); Terre Haute, IN
December 19, 2009*; 7:05 pm		at Toledo	W 55–54	7–3	Savage Arena (3,687); Toledo, OH
December 23, 2009*; 12:00 pm		IUPUI	W 72–59	8–3	Hulman Center (4,013); Terre Haute, IN
December 29, 2009; 8:05 pm		at Southern Illinois	L 52–70	8–4 (0–1)	SIU Arena (5,401); Carbondale, IL
January 1, 2010; 2:05 pm		Creighton	W 70–64	9–4 (1–1)	Hulman Center (4,017); Terre Haute, IN
January 3, 2010; 7:05 pm		at Drake	W 60–46	10–4 (2–1)	Knapp Center (3,924); Des Moines, IA
January 6, 2010; 8:05 pm		at Bradley	L 85–91 ^{OT}	10–5 (2–2)	Carver Arena (8,618); Peoria, IL
January 10, 2010; 1:35 pm		Evansville	W 69–55	11–5 (3–2)	Hulman Center (4,177); Terre Haute, IN
January 13, 2010; 7:05 pm		Wichita State	L 73–84	11–6 (3–3)	Hulman Center (4,577); Terre Haute, IN
January 16, 2010; 8:05 pm		at Northern Iowa	L 40–62	11–7 (3–4)	McLeod Center (6,778); Cedar Rapids, IA
January 19, 2010; 8:05 pm		at Missouri State	L 92–99 ^{OT}	11–8 (3–5)	JQH Arena (7,343); Springfield, MO
January 24, 2010; 2:05 pm		No. 20 Northern Iowa	L 58–67	11–9 (3–6)	Hulman Center (3,407); Terre Haute, IN
January 28, 2010; 7:05 pm		Southern Illinois	W 68–65	12–9 (4–6)	Hulman Center (1,546); Terre Haute, IN
January 31, 2010; 3:05 pm		at Evansville	W 63–56	13–9 (5–6)	Roberts Municipal Stadium (5,398); Evansville, IN
February 3, 2010; 7:05 pm		Illinois State	W 72–65	14–9 (6–6)	Hulman Center (4,322); Terre Haute, IN
February 6, 2010; 8:05 pm		at Wichita State	L 70–76	14–10 (6–7)	Charles Koch Arena (10,506); Wichita, KS
February 9, 2010; 8:05 pm		at Creighton	L 52–65	14–11 (6–8)	Qwest Center Omaha (15,768); Omaha, NE
February 13, 2010; 2:05 pm		Drake	W 76–66	15–11 (7–8)	Hulman Center (5,127); Terre Haute, IN
February 16, 2010; 7:05 pm		Bradley	W 75–69 ^{OT}	16–11 (8–8)	Hulman Center (3,986); Terre Haute, IN
February 20, 2010*; 8:05 pm		at Green Bay; ESPN BracketBusters	L 59–60	16–12	Resch Center (3,395); Green Bay, WI
February 24, 2010; 8:05 pm		at Illinois State	L 65–69	16–13 (8–9)	Redbird Arena (7,024); Normal, IL
February 27, 2010; 2:05 pm		Missouri State	W 75–72 ^{OT}	17–13 (9–9)	Hulman Center (10,200); Terre Haute, IN
Missouri Valley tournament
March 5, 2010; 9:35 pm	(6)	vs. (3) Illinois State; MVC Quarterfinals	L 65–69	17–14	Scottrade Center (10,182); St. Louis, MO
CBI
March 16, 2010; 9:00 pm		at Saint Louis; CBI First Round	L 54–63	17–15	Chaifetz Arena (3,542); St. Louis, MO
*Non-conference game. ^{#}Rankings from AP Poll. (#) Tournament seedings in parentheses. All times are in Eastern Time. Source
