= 2009–10 Illinois State Redbirds men's basketball team =

American college basketball season

2009–10 Illinois State Redbirds men's basketball

Basketball Travelers Classic champion

NIT, First Round
- Conference: Missouri Valley Conference
- Record: 22–11 (11–7 MVC)
- Head coach: Tim Jankovich (3rd season)
- Assistant coaches: Rob Judson; Anthony Beane; Paris Parham
- Home arena: Doug Collins Court at Redbird Arena

2009–10 Missouri Valley Conference men's basketball standings
	Conf.				Overall
Team	W		L	PCT	W		L	PCT
Northern Iowa †	15	–	3	.833	30	–	5	.857
Wichita State	12	–	6	.667	25	–	10	.714
Illinois State	11	–	7	.611	22	–	11	.667
Creighton	10	–	8	.556	18	–	16	.529
Bradley	9	–	9	.500	16	–	15	.516
Indiana State	9	–	9	.500	17	–	15	.531
Missouri State	8	–	10	.444	24	–	12	.667
Drake	7	–	11	.389	14	–	19	.424
Southern Illinois	6	–	12	.333	15	–	15	.500
Evansville	3	–	15	.167	9	–	21	.300
† 2010 MVC tournament winner As of March 20, 2010; Rankings from AP Poll

The 2009–10 Illinois State Redbirds men's basketball team represented Illinois State University during the 2009–10 NCAA Division I men's basketball season. The Redbirds, led by third year head coach Tim Jankovich, played their home games at Doug Collins Court at Redbird Arena and were a member of the Missouri Valley Conference.

The Redbirds finished the season 22–11, 11–7 in conference play to finish in third place. They were the number three seed for the Missouri Valley Conference tournament. They won their quarterfinal game versus Indiana State University but lost their semifinal game versus Wichita State University.

The Redbirds received an at-large bid to the 2010 National Invitation Tournament and were assigned the number six seed in the University of Illinois regional. They were defeated by the University of Dayton in the first round.

== Roster ==
2009–10 Illinois State Redbirds men's basketball team
Players
Coaches

Pos.	#	Name	Height	Weight	Year	Hometown
F	42	Dinma Odiakosa	6 ft 8 in (2.03 m)	240 lb (109 kg)	RS Sr	Akwukwu, Nigeria
G	0	Osiris Eldridge	6 ft 3 in (1.91 m)	190 lb (86 kg)	Sr	Chicago, IL
G	12	Lloyd Phillips	5 ft 10 in (1.78 m)	170 lb (77 kg)	Sr	Washington, DC
G	4	Matt Coates	5 ft 9 in (1.75 m)	170 lb (77 kg)	RS Jr	Peoria, IL
F	24	Bobby Hill	6 ft 6 in (1.98 m)	220 lb (100 kg)	RS Jr	St. Louis, MO
F	50	Blake Mishler	6 ft 8 in (2.03 m)	245 lb (111 kg)	RS Jr	Metamora, IL
G	13	Austin Hill	6 ft 1 in (1.85 m)	215 lb (98 kg)	Jr	Covington, KY
F	34	Tony Lewis	6 ft 7 in (2.01 m)	245 lb (111 kg)	Jr	Chicago, IL
G	3	Alex Rubin	6 ft 1 in (1.85 m)	185 lb (84 kg)	Jr	Plymouth, MN
F	31	Jeremy Robinson (redshirt)	6 ft 8 in (2.03 m)	210 lb (95 kg)	So	Decatur, IL
F	21	Kellen Thornton	6 ft 8 in (2.03 m)	243 lb (110 kg)	So	Country Club Hills, IL
F	32	Jackie Carmichael	6 ft 9 in (2.06 m)	240 lb (109 kg)	Fr	Manhattan, KS
G	33	Justin Clark	6 ft 4 in (1.93 m)	185 lb (84 kg)	Fr	Independence, MO
F	22	Jon Ekey (redshirt)	6 ft 7 in (2.01 m)	215 lb (98 kg)	Fr	Independence, MO
G	10	Terry Johnson	6 ft 0 in (1.83 m)	180 lb (82 kg)	Fr	Chicago, IL

Head coach

- Tim Jankovich (Kansas State)

Assistant coach(es)

- Rob Judson (Illinois)
- Anthony Beane (Kansas State)
- Paris Parham (Minnesota State)

Legend

- (C) Team captain
- (S) Suspended
- (I) Ineligible
- (W) Walk-on
- Injured
- Current redshirt

== Schedule ==
Date time, TV	Rank^{#}	Opponent^{#}	Result	Record	High points	High rebounds	High assists	Site (attendance) city, state
Exhibition
November 11, 2009; 7:05 pm		Quincy	W 66–50	—	14 – Phillips	9 – Lewis	6 – Eldridge	Redbird Arena; Normal, IL
Regular Season
November 15, 2009*; 2:30 pm		at SIU Edwardsville	W 82–60	1–0	19 – Eldridge	11 – Lewis	5 – Phillips	Vadalabene Center (3,652); Edwardsville, IL
November 21, 2009*; 4:05 pm		North Florida	W 71–55	2–0	24 – Eldridge	6 – Odiakosa	5 – 2 tied	Redbird Arena (5,019); Normal, IL
November 23, 2009*; 7:00 pm		at UIC	W 69–65	3–0	19 – Eldridge	8 – Odiakosa	4 – Rubin	UIC Pavilion (4,626); Chicago, IL
November 27, 2009*; 6:05 pm		Norfolk State; Basketball Travelers Classic	W 79–66	4–0	20 – Eldridge	8 – Thornton	4 – Eldridge	Redbird Arena (4,757); Normal, IL
November 28, 2009*; 6:05 pm		Southeast Missouri State; Basketball Travelers Classic	W 93–53	5–0	19 – 2 tied	6 – Lewis	5 – Phillips	Redbird Arena (4,945); Normal, IL
November 29, 2009*; 3:35 pm		St. Bonaventure; Basketball Travelers Classic	W 80–77	6–0	28 – Eldridge	10 – Carmichael	3 – 4 tied	Redbird Arena (5,112); Normal, IL
December 5, 2009*; 7:05 pm, CSN		Central Michigan	W 75–62	7–0	16 – Odiakosa	10 – Odiakosa	4 – Phillips	Redbird Arena (7,060); Normal, IL
December 13, 2009*; 2:05 pm, CSN		Niagara	L 68–76	7–1	14 – Odiakosa	13 – 2 tied	6 – Phillips	Redbird Arena (6,088); Normal, IL
December 16, 2009*; 6:00 pm, CSN		at Ohio	L 57–75	7–2	13 – Odiakosa	11 – Odiakosa	6 – Phillips	Convocation Center (3,694); Athens, OH
December 19, 2009*; 5:00 pm, the mtn.		at Utah; MWC–MVC Challenge	W 73–63	8–2	17 – 2 tied	10 – Carmichael	5 – Phillips	Jon M. Huntsman Center (8,403); Salt Lake City, UT
December 22, 2009*; 7:05 pm		Grambling State	W 80–56	9–2	23 – Eldridge	11 – Odiakosa	4 – Rubin	Redbird Arena (5,691); Normal, IL
December 29, 2009; 7:05 pm		Wichita State	W 72–57	10–2 (1–0)	26 – Eldridge	8 – 2 tied	5 – Eldridge	Redbird Arena (7,408); Normal, IL
January 1, 2010; 7:05 pm, CSN		at Missouri State	L 64–68	10–3 (1–1)	14 – Carmichael	9 – Odiakosa	3 – 3 tied	JQH Arena (10,008); Springfield, MO
January 3, 2010; 7:00 pm, ESPNU		Southern Illinois	W 68–61	11–3 (2–1)	21 – Phillips	7 – Lewis	3 – 3 tied	Redbird Arena (7,578); Normal, IL
January 6, 2010; 7:05 pm, CSN		at Evansville	W 82–63	12–3 (3–1)	20 – Carmichael	8 – 2 tied	9 – Phillips	Roberts Municipal Stadium (4,427); Evansville, IN
January 9, 2010; 3:00 pm, ESPN2		Northern Iowa	L 44–59	12–4 (3–2)	13 – Rubin	14 – Odiakosa	6 – Phillips	Redbird Arena (7,755); Normal, IL
January 13, 2010; 7:05 pm, CSN		Evansville	W 70–56	13–4 (4–2)	18 – Phillips	11 – Odiakosa	4 – Phillips	Redbird Arena (6,329); Normal, IL
January 17, 2010; 7:00 pm, ESPNU		at Drake	L 59–69	13–5 (4–3)	26 – Eldridge	7 – Odiakosa	3 – Phillips	Knapp Center (4,273); Des Moines, IA
January 20, 2010; 7:05 pm		Creighton	W 71–62	14–5 (5–3)	17 – Eldridge	11 – Odiakosa	4 – Phillips	Redbird Arena (6,288); Normal, IL
January 23, 2010; 2:05 pm, CSN		at Southern Illinois	L 80–81 ^{OT}	14–6 (5–4)	16 – 3 tied	7 – Odiakosa	4 – Phillips	SIU Arena (6,367); Carbondale, IL
January 27, 2010; 6:05 pm, CSN/FSN		at Wichita State	L 66–74	14–7 (5–5)	22 – Phillips	8 – Odiakosa	8 – Phillips	Charles Koch Arena (10,506); Wichita, KS
January 30, 2010; 4:35 pm, CSN/FSN		Bradley	W 66–47	15–7 (6–5)	25 – Odiakosa	13 – Lewis	4 – Rubin	Redbird Arena (10,200); Normal, IL
February 3, 2010; 6:00 pm, CSN		at Indiana State	L 65–72	15–8 (6–6)	21 – Odiakosa	9 – Odiakosa	5 – Eldridge	Hulman Center (4,322); Terre Haute, IN
February 6, 2010; 7:05 pm, CSN		Drake	W 71–69	16–8 (7–6)	17 – Phillips	9 – Eldridge	6 – Rubin	Redbird Arena (8,291); Normal, IL
February 9, 2010; 7:05 pm, CSN		at Bradley	W 62–61	17–8 (8–6)	14 – A. Hill	15 – Odiakosa	3 – Phillips	Carver Arena (11,281); Peoria, IL
February 13, 2010; 2:05 pm, CSN		at Creighton	W 67–63	18–8 (9–6)	12 – 2 tied	9 – Odiakosa	6 – Phillips	Qwest Center Omaha (16,209); Omaha, NE
February 17, 2010; 8:05 pm, CSN/FSN		Missouri State	W 76–72	19–8 (10–6)	30 – Odiakosa	7 – Odiakosa	6 – Phillips	Redbird Arena (6,039); Normal, IL
February 20, 2010*; 4:05 pm		Morehead State; ESPN BracketBusters	W 71–62	20–8	26 – Eldridge	11 – Odiakosa	5 – Rubin	Redbird Arena (5,953); Normal, IL
February 24, 2010; 7:05 pm, CSN		Indiana State	W 75–58	21–8 (11–6)	21 – Odiakosa	12 – Odiakosa	4 – Phillips	Redbird Arena (7,024); Normal, IL
February 27, 2010; 7:00 pm, ESPN2		at No. 25 Northern Iowa	L 55–61	21–9 (11–7)	14 – Eldridge	10 – Lewis	3 – Phillips	McLeod Center (7,332); Cedar Falls, IA
Missouri Valley tournament
March 5, 2010; 8:35 pm, CSN/FSN	(3)	vs. (6) Indiana State; Arch Madness Quarterfinal	W 69–65	22–9	17 – 2 tied	13 – Odiakosa	2 – Phillips	Scottrade Center (10,182); St. Louis, MO
March 7, 2010; 4:05 pm, CSN/FSN	(3)	vs. (2) Wichita State; Arch Madness Semifinal	L 61–65	22–10	15 – Odiakosa	6 – 4 tied	5 – A. Hill	Scottrade Center (13,814); St. Louis, MO
NIT
March 17, 2010; 6:00 pm	(6 I)	at (3 I) Dayton; First Round	L 42–63	22–11	12 – Eldridge	5 – 2 tied	7 – Phillips	University of Dayton Arena (5,127); Dayton, OH
*Non-conference game. ^{#}Rankings from AP Poll. (#) Tournament seedings in parentheses. I=NIT Illinois bracket. All times are in Central Standard Time. Source
