= 2009–10 Creighton Bluejays men's basketball team =

American college basketball season

2009–10 Creighton Bluejays men's basketball
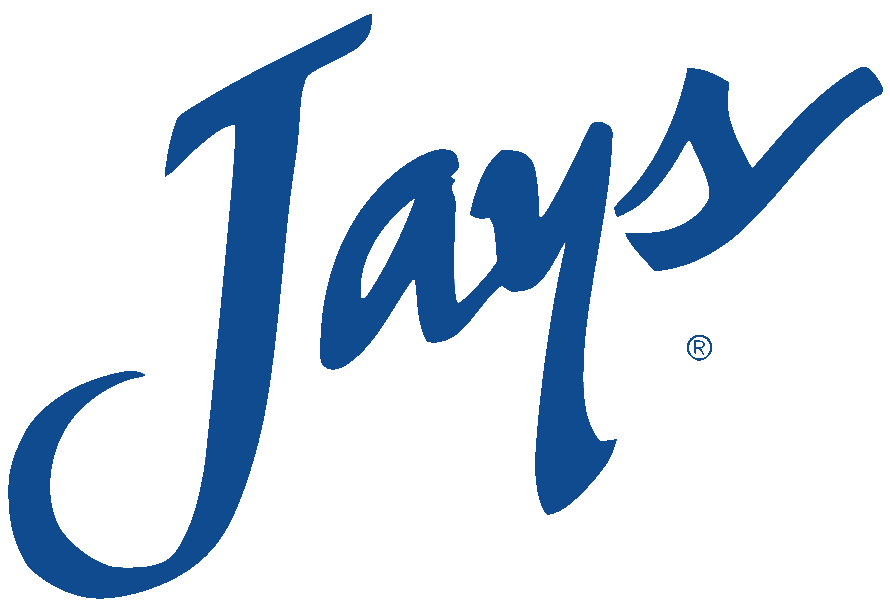

CIT, Semifinal
- Conference: Missouri Valley Conference
- Record: 18–16 (10–8 MVC)
- Head coach: Dana Altman (16th season)
- Assistant coach: Darian DeVries (12th year)
- Home arena: Qwest Center Omaha

2009–10 Missouri Valley Conference men's basketball standings
	Conf.				Overall
Team	W		L	PCT	W		L	PCT
Northern Iowa †	15	–	3	.833	30	–	5	.857
Wichita State	12	–	6	.667	25	–	10	.714
Illinois State	11	–	7	.611	22	–	11	.667
Creighton	10	–	8	.556	18	–	16	.529
Bradley	9	–	9	.500	16	–	15	.516
Indiana State	9	–	9	.500	17	–	15	.531
Missouri State	8	–	10	.444	24	–	12	.667
Drake	7	–	11	.389	14	–	19	.424
Southern Illinois	6	–	12	.333	15	–	15	.500
Evansville	3	–	15	.167	9	–	21	.300
† 2010 MVC tournament winner As of March 20, 2010; Rankings from AP Poll

The 2009–10 Creighton Bluejays men's basketball team represented Creighton University in the 2009–10 NCAA Division I men's basketball season. Led by head coach Dana Altman in his 16th and subsequently final season as he would take the job at Oregon following the season. Creighton would then hire Greg McDermott as his successor. In 2009–10, the Bluejays would end the regular season with a record of 16–15 and despite losing in the first round of the Missouri Valley Conference tournament, they would qualify for the CIT and make their way to the semifinal round before losing to eventual champion Missouri State.

== Postseason ==
2010 Missouri Valley Conference men's basketball tournament
3/5/10 Vs. Bradley @ Scottrade Center L, 62-81
2010 CollegeInsider.com Postseason Tournament
3/16/10 Vs. South Dakota @ Qwest Center Omaha W, 89-78
3/22/10 Vs. Fairfield @ Qwest Center Omaha W, 73-55
3/24/10 Vs. Missouri State @ JQH Arena L, 65-78
