= Chris Flores (basketball) =

American basketball player (born 1990)

Personal information
- Born: May 10, 1990 (age 36) Boston, Massachusetts, U.S.
- Listed height: 6 ft 2 in (1.88 m)
- Listed weight: 195 lb (88 kg)

Career information
- High school: John D. O'Bryant (Roxbury, Massachusetts); Marianapolis Prep (Thompson, Connecticut)
- College: NJIT (2009–2013)
- NBA draft: 2013: undrafted
- Playing career: 2013–2015
- Position: Point guard / shooting guard

Career history
- 2013–2015: Uni-Riesen Leipzig

Career highlights
- Great West Player of the Year (2013); First-team All-GWC (2013); 3× Second-team All-GWC (2010–2012)

Christopher Mauricio Flores (born May 10, 1990) is an American former professional basketball player. He was the 2012–13 Great West Conference Player of the Year as a senior after leading the NJIT Highlanders to the school's first ever Great West Conference regular season championship. He is NJIT's all-time leading scorer in the Division I era after finishing his career with 1,726 points.

== Family ==
Julian Flores (8). Marco Banegas-Flores

== High school ==
Flores spent his traditional four-year high school career at John D. O'Bryant School of Mathematics & Science in Roxbury, Massachusetts. In 2008–09, he spent one additional year at Marianapolis Preparatory School in Thompson, Connecticut. Flores averaged 17 points per game during that postgraduate year while shooting greater than 40 percent from three-point range. In the 2009 New England Class B Prep championship he scored 35 points. The New England Recruiting Report tabbed him as the 18th-best prospect from the state of Connecticut.

== College ==
Flores suited up for the NJIT Highlanders from 2009–10 through 2012–13. In all four seasons he averaged between 12.6 and 16.9 points per game. From his freshman through his junior years, Flores was named to the All-Great West Conference Second Team, and in his freshman season he was also named to the All-GWC Newcomer Team as well as its Freshman of the Year. Heading into his senior season, the Great West Conference media selected Flores as the preseason player of the year. The media's prediction came true after Flores was named its player of the year by leading the Highlanders to their first ever conference regular season championship.

== Professional ==
Flores went unselected in the 2013 NBA draft. The Brooklyn Nets were the only NBA team to give him a pre-draft workout, and when no other teams showed interest he began his professional career overseas. In August 2013 he signed with Uni-Riesen Leipzig, a team in Germany's Bundesliga Pro-B. He played there for two seasons before returning to the United States to pursue a business career.

== See also ==
- List of NCAA Division I men's basketball career scoring leaders
