= Tyler Cain =

American basketball player (born 1988)

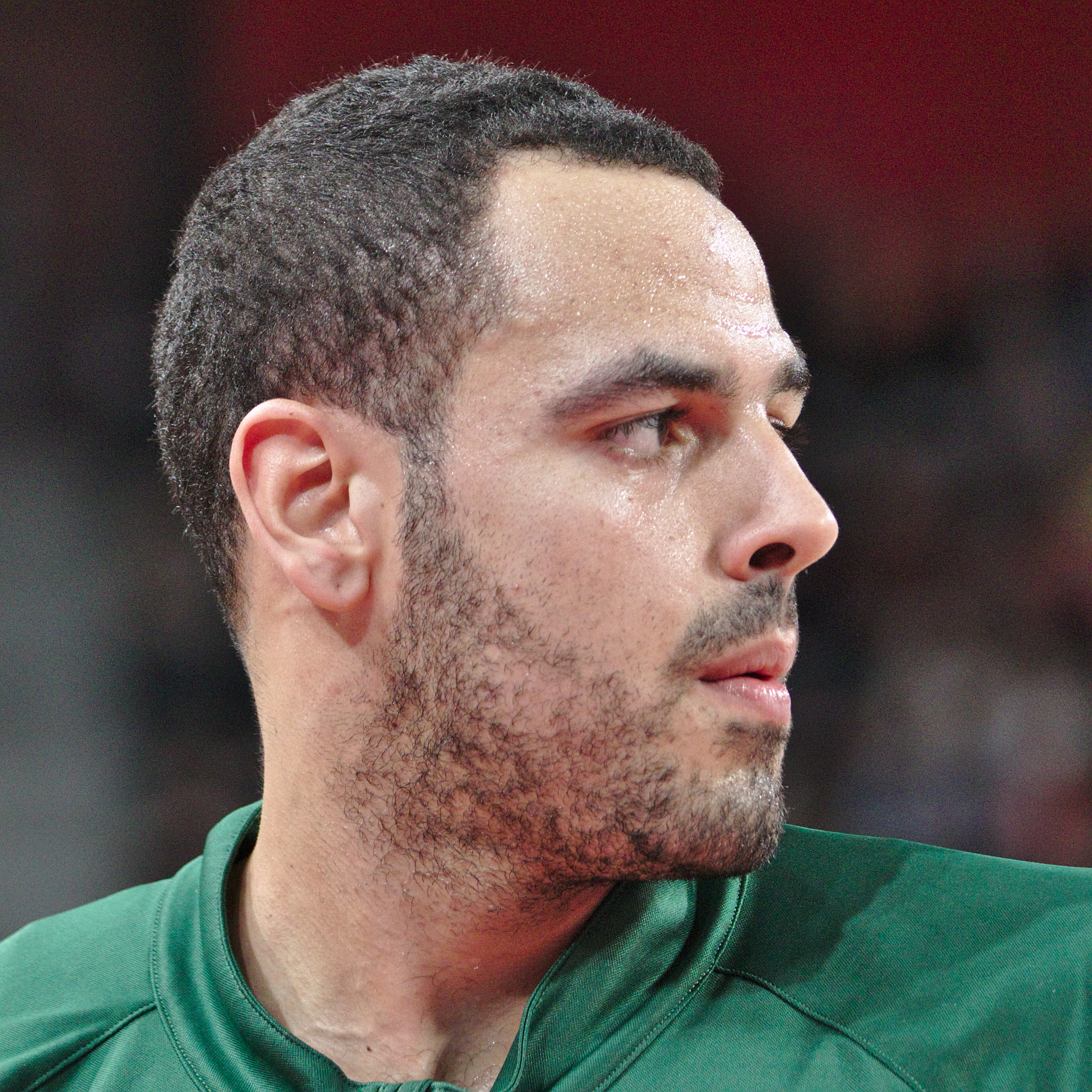

Free Agent
- Position: Center

Personal information
- Born: June 30, 1988 (age 38) Rochester, Minnesota
- Listed height: 2.04 m (6 ft 8 in)
- Listed weight: 107 kg (236 lb)

Career information
- High school: John Marshall (Rochester, Minnesota)
- College: South Dakota (2006–2010)
- NBA draft: 2010: undrafted
- Playing career: 2010–present

Career history
- 2010–2012: VEF Rīga
- 2012–2013: Barons Kvartāls
- 2013–2014: Fulgor Libertas Forlì
- 2014–2015: Élan Béarnais Pau-Orthez
- 2015–2016: JDA Dijon
- 2016–2017: Champagne Châlons-Reims
- 2017–2019: Varese
- 2019–2020: Germani Basket Brescia
- 2020–2021: Victoria Libertas Pesaro
- 2021–2023: Derthona Basket

Career highlights
- Italian League rebounding leader (2021); 2× Latvian Basketball League champion (2011, 2012); GWC Player of the Year (2010); GWC Defensive Player of the Year (2010); First-team GWC (2010); All-Independent First Team (2009); All-Independent Defensive Player of the Year (2009); NCC Freshman of the Year (2007)

Tyler Cain (born June 30, 1988) is an American basketball player who last played for Derthona Basket of the Italian Lega Basket Serie A (LBA). He played college basketball for the University of South Dakota (USD). He is best known for being the inaugural winner of the Great West Conference Men's Basketball Player of the Year award in 2009–10, the conference's first as a Division I basketball league. As a senior that season, Cain became the second player in USD history to record 1,000 points and 1,000 rebounds. He is also USD's all-time leading shot blocker after compiling 361 during his career.

== Early life ==
Cain was born in Rochester, Minnesota to parents Richard and Laurie and sister Erica. He attended John Marshall High School in his hometown where he was a star basketball player. Cain was twice named all-conference and once named honorable mention all-state. He was on the list for Minnesota Mr. Basketball and for McDonald's All-American. His specialty was shot blocking, where he set several school records that surpassed Oklahoma Sooner Longar Longar's previous JMHS records: blocks in a game (24), season (106) and career (188). As a senior in 2005–06, Cain averaged 19 points, 13 rebounds and 4 blocks per game.

== College ==
In Cain's college career, the University of South Dakota was in a stage of transition for its athletics program. During his freshman (2006–07) and sophomore (2007–08) seasons, the Coyotes were a member of the North Central Conference in Division II. In 2008–09, USD joined the Great West Conference but were still classified as an independent school for certain sports, including basketball. Then, as a senior in 2009–10, the Coyotes finally became full-fledged members of the GWC in Division I.

Over his four-year career, Cain was South Dakota's best player. He started in 115 of the 120 games he played in and he set the top four USD single-season blocks totals. When his career ended, Cain finished as the school's 11th leading scorer (1,390), second leading rebounder (1,088) and tops in blocked shots (361). He compiled 36 career double-doubles while scoring in double figures on 74 occasions. Cain capped his career by winning the first ever GWC Player of the Year award.

== Professional ==
In August 2010, Cain signed a contract to play for BK VEF Rīga of the Baltic Basketball League in Latvia. In December 2012, after not getting job at higher level Cain returned to Latvia and signed with Barons Kvartāls. He averaged double-double in Latvian league (15.8 points and 10.6 rebounds). Before 2013–2014 season Cain signed with Fulgor Libertas Forlì in Italian second division, where he again averaged double-double (17.0 points and 11.1 rebounds)

On June 24, 2019, he has signed 2 years deal with Germani Basket Brescia of the LBA. Cain averaged 8.7 points and 6.5 rebounds per game.

On July 31, 2020, he parted ways with Brescia, and signed in the same league with Victoria Libertas Pesaro. In that season, Cain had the highest rebounds of the competition.

On Sunday July 11, 2021, Cain signed with Derthona Basket, newly promoted to the Lega Basket Serie A.
