= 2009–10 NCAA Division I men's basketball season =

Basketball season

- Preseason AP No. 1: Kansas Jayhawks
- Regular season: November 9, 2009 – March 9, 2010
- NCAA Tournament: 2010
- Tournament dates: March 16 – April 5, 2010
- National Championship: Lucas Oil Stadium; Indianapolis, Indiana
- NCAA Champions: Duke Blue Devils
- Other champions: Dayton Flyers (NIT), VCU Rams (CBI), Missouri State Bears (CIT)
- Player of the Year (Naismith, Wooden): Evan Turner, Ohio State Buckeyes

The 2009–10 NCAA Division I men's basketball season began on November 9, 2009, and ended with the 2010 NCAA Division I men's basketball tournament's championship game on April 5, 2010, at Lucas Oil Stadium in Indianapolis, Indiana. The opening round occurred on Tuesday, March 16, 2010, followed by first and second rounds on Thursday through Sunday, March 18–21, 2010. Regional games were played on Thursday through Sunday, March 25–28, 2010, with the Final Four played on Saturday and Monday, April 3 and 5, 2010.

== Season headlines ==
- The Duke Blue Devils and head coach Mike Krzyzewski won their fourth national championship, defeating upstart Butler 61–59 behind their "big three" of Jon Scheyer, Kyle Singler and Nolan Smith. The game was played in Butler's home town of Indianapolis.
- Krzyzewski became the third coach in NCAA history to win four championships, joining John Wooden (10) and Adolph Rupp (4).
- Kentucky became the first college team to reach the 2000 win mark by defeating Drexel 88–44 on December 21. North Carolina became the second with a win over Miami on March 2. Kansas became the third with a win over Texas Tech on March 11.
- Arkansas sophomore guard Rotnei Clarke set an SEC record by hitting 13 three-pointers in a game in the Razorbacks' November 13 season opener against Alcorn State. Clarke connected on 13 of 17 three-pointers and finished the game with 51 points. Clarke's 51 points was an Arkansas school record, while his 13 threes was good for fifth in NCAA history.
- Prior to the season the NCAA announced that Memphis would serve three years' probation and would vacate their record-setting 38-win 2007–08 season due to a fraudulent SAT score by star Derrick Rose and extra benefits given to Rose's brother under then-coach John Calipari. Memphis appealed the decision. The NCAA rejected the appeal during the NCAA tournament.
- Binghamton University dismissed six players on September 25, following the arraignment of Emanuel "Tiki" Mayben on charges of cocaine distribution. The move left Binghamton with only seven scholarship players for the 2009–10 season and included the dismissal of star guard D.J. Rivera. Coach Kevin Broadus was placed on administrative leave and assistant Mark Macon served as interim coach.
- The preseason AP All-American team was named on November 2. Luke Harangody of Notre Dame (57 votes), Cole Aldrich (49) and Sherron Collins (39) of Kansas, Patrick Patterson of Kentucky (35) and Kyle Singler of Duke (30) were tabbed.
- Utah Valley gained full Division I status after a seven-year provisional period where they played a D1 schedule. This move was the first time that a school had moved to D1 directly from the NJCAA. Other schools to officially gain Division I status include Kennesaw State, NJIT and North Florida.
- The Great West Conference began league play in 2009–10 as the 32nd Division I conference.
- Notre Dame forward Luke Harangody surpassed both the 2000-point and 1000-rebound marks during the season, becoming the first Fighting Irish player to do so.
- Mercer guard James Florence, South Carolina guard Devan Downey, Maryland guard Greivis Vásquez, San Francisco forward Dior Lowhorn, Morgan State guard Reggie Holmes, Western Michigan guard David Kool, West Virginia forward Da'Sean Butler, Villanova guard Scottie Reynolds, Cornell forward Ryan Wittman and Duke guard Jon Scheyer surpassed the 2,000 point mark during the season.
- Syracuse coach Jim Boeheim became the eighth Division I coach to win 800 games when the Orange defeated Albany 75–43 on November 9.
- Tom Penders became the eighth head coach in NCAA history to lead four different schools to the NCAA Tournament when he coached the Houston Cougars to the Conference USA tournament title. Penders had previously led Rhode Island, Texas and George Washington to NCAA tournament berths.
- In November, Evan Turner became the 34th player to record multiple triple doubles in a season. Over the course of the 2009–10 Big Ten season, he became the first player to finish in the top two in average points (1st, 20.4), rebounds (2nd, 9.2) and assists (2nd, 6.0) in Big Ten Conference history. Along the way, he broke and rebroke Big Ten records for single-season (7) and career (10) Player of the week awards.
- On February 22, Cole Aldrich was named the men's college basketball Academic All-American of the year.
- On February 24, Mississippi State's Jarvis Varnado became the NCAA's all-time leading shot-blocker.
- On February 27, a contest between then-no. 4 Syracuse and then-no. 8 Villanova set the NCAA on-campus basketball attendance record, with 34,616 spectators packing the Carrier Dome. The Wildcats fell to the Orange, 95–77.
- The rise and fall of Texas. Ranked in the top three from the beginning of the season until mid-January, including two weeks at #1, they were considered national title contenders. But they fell out of the top 25 less than two months later, lost two starters (Doğuş Balbay and Varez Ward) to season-ending injuries, and lost in the opening round of the NCAA tournament.
- On April 1, Deon Thompson of North Carolina appeared in the NIT Championship game, giving him 152 career game appearances. This set the NCAA all-time career games played mark, formerly held by Wayne Turner of Kentucky and Walter Hodge of Florida.
- Third-year coach Tommy Amaker leads Harvard to its most wins in school history (21) behind the play of rare Harvard NBA player Jeremy Lin.

== Major rule changes ==
Beginning in 2009–10, the following rules changes were implemented:

- The NCAA reduced the amount of time that college underclassmen can test the waters for the NBA draft and still retain their college eligibility. As of this season, players have until early May (rather than mid-June) to decide to return.
- Secondary defenders must now establish their position outside of the zone between the backboard and the front of the rim to draw a charge.
- If a player is injured and unable to shoot his own foul shots, the replacement shooter must be chosen from the players currently on the court.
- Instant replay may now be used to determine flagrant fouls.

== Season outlook ==
=== Pre-season polls ===
The top 25 from the AP and ESPN/USA Today Coaches Polls, October 29, 2009. Collegeinsider.com released the preseason Mid-Major Top 25 poll on November 3. This poll was meant to recognize the top teams outside of major conferences.

'Associated Press'
Ranking	Team
1	Kansas (55)
2	Michigan State (5)
3	Texas (1)
4	Kentucky (3)
5	Villanova
6	North Carolina (1)
7	Purdue
8	West Virginia
9	Duke
10	Tennessee
11	Butler
12	Connecticut
13	California
14	Washington
15	Michigan
16	Ohio State
17	Oklahoma
18	Mississippi State
19	Louisville
20	Georgetown
21	Dayton
22	Georgia Tech
23	Illinois
24	Clemson
25	Minnesota

ESPN/USA Today Coaches
Ranking	Team
1	Kansas (27)
2	Michigan State (3)
3	Texas
4	North Carolina (1)
5	Kentucky
6	Villanova
7	Purdue
8	Duke
9	West Virginia
10	Butler
11	Tennessee
12	California
13	Washington
14	Connecticut
15	Michigan
16	Oklahoma
17	Ohio State
18	Minnesota
19	Mississippi State
20	Georgia Tech
21	Georgetown
22	Dayton
23	Louisville
24	Clemson
25	Syracuse

Collegeinsider.com Mid-Major Top 25
Ranking	Team
1	Butler (28)
2	Gonzaga (2)
3	Siena (1)
4	Northern Iowa
5	Western Kentucky
6	Old Dominion
7	Creighton
8	Akron
9	Wright State
10	Niagara
11	VCU
12	George Mason
13	Northeastern
14	Oakland
15	Portland
16	Illinois State
17	College Of Charleston
18	Cornell
19	Rider
20	Long Beach State
21	South Alabama
22	Boston University
23	St. Mary's
24	Davidson
25	Radford

== Conference membership changes ==
These schools joined new conferences for the 2009–10 season.

School	Former conference	New conference
Bryant Bulldogs	NCAA Division I Independent	Northeast Conference
Chicago State Cougars	NCAA Division I Independent	Great West Conference
Houston Baptist Huskies	NCAA Division I Independent	Great West Conference
NJIT Highlanders	NCAA Division I Independent	Great West Conference
North Dakota Fighting Sioux	NCAA Division I Independent	Great West Conference
South Dakota Coyotes	NCAA Division I Independent	Great West Conference
Texas–Pan American Broncs	NCAA Division I Independent	Great West Conference
Utah Valley Wolverines	NCAA Division I Independent	Great West Conference
Winston-Salem State Rams	Mid-Eastern Athletic Conference	NCAA Division I Independent

== Regular season ==
=== Early-season tournaments ===
Name	Dates	Num. teams	Champions
NIT Season Tip-Off	Nov. 16–27	16	Duke
Coaches vs. Cancer Classic	Nov. 19–20	4*	Syracuse
Charleston Classic	Nov. 19–22	8	Miami (FL)
Puerto Rico Tip-Off	Nov. 19–22	8	Villanova
Glenn Wilkes Classic	Nov. 20–22	10	NC State
Paradise Jam tournament	Nov. 20–23	8	Purdue
CBE Classic	Nov. 23–24	4*	Texas
Maui Invitational Tournament	Nov. 23–25	8	Gonzaga
Cancún Challenge	Nov. 24–25	4*	Kentucky
Great Alaska Shootout	Nov. 25–28	8	Washington State
76 Classic	Nov. 26–29	8	West Virginia
Old Spice Classic	Nov. 26–29	8	Florida State
Las Vegas Invitational	Nov. 27–28	4*	Oklahoma State
Legends Classic	Nov. 27–28	4*	Florida
South Padre Island Invitational	Nov. 27–28	8	Richmond
Diamond Head Classic	Dec. 22–25	8	Southern California
UCF Holiday Classic	Dec. 29–30	4	Jacksonville

*Although these tournaments included more teams, only four played for the championship.

=== Conferences ===
==== Conference winners and tournaments ====
Thirty-one conference seasons concluded with a single-elimination tournament. Conference tournament winners received an automatic bid to the 2010 NCAA Division I men's basketball tournament except for the winner of the Great West Conference tournament, although Great West Tournament champion South Dakota received an automatic bid to the 2010 CollegeInsider.com Tournament. The Ivy League was the only NCAA Division I conference that did not hold a conference tournament, instead sending its regular-season champion to the NCAA tournament.

Conference	Regular season winner	Conference player of the year	Conference tournament	Tournament venue (City)	Tournament Winner
America East Conference	Stony Brook	Muhammad El-Amin, Stony Brook	2010 America East men's basketball tournament	Chase Family Arena (Hartford, Connecticut); Final at campus site	Vermont
Atlantic 10 Conference	Temple & Xavier	Kevin Anderson, Richmond	2010 Atlantic 10 men's basketball tournament	Boardwalk Hall (Atlantic City, New Jersey)	Temple
Atlantic Coast Conference	Duke & Maryland	Greivis Vásquez, Maryland	2010 ACC men's basketball tournament	Greensboro Coliseum (Greensboro, North Carolina)	Duke
Atlantic Sun Conference	Lipscomb, Belmont, Jacksonville & Campbell	Adnan Hodžić, Lipscomb	2010 Atlantic Sun men's basketball tournament	University Center (Macon, Georgia)	East Tennessee State
Big 12 Conference	Kansas	James Anderson, Oklahoma State	2010 Big 12 men's basketball tournament	Sprint Center (Kansas City, Missouri)	Kansas
Big East Conference	Syracuse	Wes Johnson, Syracuse	2010 Big East men's basketball tournament	Madison Square Garden (New York City, New York)	West Virginia
Big Sky Conference	Weber State	Damian Lillard, Weber State	2010 Big Sky men's basketball tournament	Dee Events Center (Ogden, Utah); First round at campus sites	Montana
Big South Conference	Coastal Carolina	Artsiom Parakhouski, Radford	2010 Big South Conference men's basketball tournament	Campus Sites	Winthrop
Big Ten Conference	Michigan State, Ohio State & Purdue	Evan Turner, Ohio State	2010 Big Ten Conference men's basketball tournament	Conseco Fieldhouse (Indianapolis)	Ohio State
Big West Conference	Pacific & UC Santa Barbara	Orlando Johnson, UC Santa Barbara	2010 Big West Conference men's basketball tournament	Anaheim Convention Center (Anaheim, California)	UC Santa Barbara
Colonial Athletic Association	Old Dominion	Charles Jenkins, Hofstra	2010 CAA men's basketball tournament	Richmond Coliseum (Richmond, Virginia)	Old Dominion
Conference USA	UTEP	Randy Culpepper, UTEP	2010 Conference USA men's basketball tournament	BOK Center (Tulsa, Oklahoma)	Houston
Great West Conference	South Dakota	Tyler Cain, South Dakota	2010 Great West Conference men's basketball tournament	McKay Events Center (Orem, Utah)	South Dakota
Horizon League	Butler	Gordon Hayward, Butler	2010 Horizon League men's basketball tournament	Hinkle Fieldhouse (Indianapolis); First round at campus sites	Butler
Ivy League	Cornell	Ryan Wittman, Cornell	No Tournament		
Metro Atlantic Athletic Conference	Siena	Alex Franklin, Siena	2010 MAAC men's basketball tournament	Times Union Center (Albany, New York)	Siena
Mid-American Conference	Kent State (East); Central Michigan (West)	David Kool, Western Michigan	2010 MAC men's basketball tournament	Quicken Loans Arena (Cleveland, Ohio)	Ohio
Mid-Eastern Athletic Conference	Morgan State	Reggie Holmes, Morgan State	2010 MEAC men's basketball tournament	Lawrence Joel Veterans Memorial Coliseum (Winston-Salem, North Carolina)	Morgan State
Missouri Valley Conference	Northern Iowa	Adam Koch, Northern Iowa	2010 Missouri Valley Conference men's basketball tournament	Scottrade Center (St. Louis, Missouri)	Northern Iowa
Mountain West Conference	New Mexico	Darington Hobson, New Mexico	2010 MWC men's basketball tournament	Thomas & Mack Center (Paradise, Nevada)	San Diego State
Northeast Conference	Quinnipiac & Robert Morris	Justin Rutty, Quinnipiac	2010 Northeast Conference men's basketball tournament	Campus Sites	Robert Morris
Ohio Valley Conference	Murray State	Kenneth Faried, Morehead State	2010 Ohio Valley Conference men's basketball tournament	First round at campus sites, Final Four at Bridgestone Arena (Nashville, Tennessee)	Murray State
Pacific-10 Conference	California	Jerome Randle, California	2010 Pacific-10 Conference men's basketball tournament	Staples Center (Los Angeles)	Washington
Patriot League	Lehigh	CJ McCollum, Lehigh	2010 Patriot League men's basketball tournament	Campus Sites	Lehigh
Southeastern Conference	Kentucky (East & Overall); Mississippi & Mississippi State (West)	John Wall, Kentucky	2010 SEC men's basketball tournament	Bridgestone Arena (Nashville, Tennessee)	Kentucky
Southern Conference	Appalachian State (North); Wofford (South)	Noah Dahlman, Wofford (Coaches); Donald Sims, Appalachian State (Media)	2010 Southern Conference men's basketball tournament	Bojangles' Coliseum (first two rounds); Time Warner Cable Arena (semifinals and final) (Charlotte, North Carolina)	Wofford
Southland Conference	Stephen F. Austin (East); Sam Houston State (West)	Marquez Haynes, UT Arlington	2010 Southland Conference men's basketball tournament	Leonard E. Merrell Center (Katy, Texas)	Sam Houston State
Southwestern Athletic Conference	Jackson State	Garrison Johnson, Jackson State	2010 SWAC men's basketball tournament	CenturyTel Center (Bossier City, Louisiana)	Arkansas-Pine Bluff
The Summit League	Oakland	Keith Benson, Oakland	2010 Summit League men's basketball tournament	Sioux Falls Arena (Sioux Falls, South Dakota)	Oakland
Sun Belt Conference	Middle Tennessee & Troy (East); North Texas (West)	Tyren Johnson, Louisiana-Lafayette	2010 Sun Belt men's basketball tournament	Summit Arena (Hot Springs, Arkansas)	North Texas
West Coast Conference	Gonzaga	Matt Bouldin, Gonzaga	2010 West Coast Conference men's basketball tournament	Orleans Arena (Paradise, Nevada)	Saint Mary's
Western Athletic Conference	Utah State	Luke Babbitt, Nevada	2010 WAC men's basketball tournament	Lawlor Events Center (Reno, Nevada)	New Mexico State

==== Conference standings ====
2009–10 America East men's basketball standings
	Conf.				Overall
Team	W		L	PCT	W		L	PCT
Stony Brook	13	–	3	.813	22	–	10	.688
Vermont †	12	–	4	.750	25	–	10	.714
Maine	11	–	5	.688	19	–	11	.633
Boston University	11	–	5	.688	21	–	14	.600
Binghamton	8	–	8	.500	13	–	18	.419
Hartford	6	–	10	.375	8	–	22	.267
New Hampshire	6	–	10	.375	13	–	17	.433
UMBC	3	–	13	.188	4	–	26	.133
Albany	2	–	14	.125	7	–	25	.219
† 2010 America East tournament winner As of March 19, 2010; Rankings from AP Poll

2009–10 Atlantic 10 men's basketball standings
	Conf.				Overall
Team	W		L	PCT	W		L	PCT
No. 12 Temple†	14	–	2	.875	29	–	6	.829
No. 25 Xavier	14	–	2	.875	26	–	9	.743
No. 24 Richmond	13	–	3	.813	26	–	9	.743
Saint Louis	11	–	5	.688	23	–	13	.639
Rhode Island	9	–	7	.563	26	–	10	.722
Charlotte	9	–	7	.563	19	–	12	.613
Dayton	8	–	8	.500	25	–	12	.676
St. Bonaventure	7	–	9	.438	15	–	16	.484
Duquesne	7	–	9	.438	16	–	16	.500
George Washington	6	–	10	.375	16	–	15	.516
UMass	5	–	11	.313	12	–	20	.375
Saint Joseph's	5	–	11	.313	11	–	20	.355
La Salle	4	–	12	.250	12	–	18	.400
Fordham	0	–	16	.000	2	–	26	.071
† 2010 Atlantic 10 Tournament winner Rankings from AP Poll

2009–10 ACC men's basketball standings
	Conf.				Overall
Team	W		L	PCT	W		L	PCT
No. 3 Duke †	13	–	3	.813	35	–	5	.875
No. 20 Maryland	13	–	3	.813	24	–	9	.727
Florida State	10	–	6	.625	22	–	10	.688
Virginia Tech	10	–	6	.625	25	–	9	.735
Wake Forest	9	–	7	.563	20	–	10	.667
Clemson	9	–	7	.563	21	–	11	.656
Georgia Tech	7	–	9	.438	23	–	13	.639
Boston College	6	–	10	.375	15	–	16	.484
Virginia	5	–	11	.313	15	–	16	.484
North Carolina	5	–	11	.313	20	–	17	.541
NC State	5	–	11	.313	20	–	16	.556
Miami (FL)	4	–	12	.250	20	–	13	.606
† 2010 ACC tournament winner As of March 19, 2010; Rankings from AP Poll

2009–10 Atlantic Sun men's basketball standings
	Conf.				Overall
Team	W		L	PCT	W		L	PCT
Lipscomb	14	–	6	.700	17	–	13	.567
Jacksonville	14	–	6	.700	18	–	11	.621
Belmont	14	–	6	.700	19	–	11	.633
Campbell	14	–	6	.700	19	–	10	.655
East Tennessee State †	13	–	7	.650	17	–	14	.548
Mercer	10	–	10	.500	14	–	16	.467
North Florida	8	–	12	.400	13	–	17	.433
Kennesaw State	7	–	13	.350	13	–	19	.406
USC Upstate	6	–	14	.300	6	–	23	.207
Florida Gulf Coast	5	–	15	.250	8	–	21	.276
Stetson	5	–	15	.250	7	–	22	.241
† 2010 Atlantic Sun Tournament winner As of March 2, 2010; Rankings from AP Poll

2009–10 Big East men's basketball standings
	Conf.				Overall
Team	W		L	PCT	W		L	PCT
No. 4 Syracuse	15	–	3	.833	30	–	5	.857
No. 6 West Virginia †	13	–	5	.722	31	–	7	.816
No. 9 Villanova	13	–	5	.722	25	–	8	.758
No. 18 Pittsburgh	13	–	5	.722	25	–	9	.735
Marquette	11	–	7	.611	22	–	12	.647
Louisville	11	–	7	.611	20	–	13	.606
No. 14 Georgetown	10	–	8	.556	23	–	11	.676
Notre Dame	10	–	8	.556	23	–	12	.657
South Florida	9	–	9	.500	20	–	13	.606
Seton Hall	9	–	9	.500	19	–	13	.594
Cincinnati	7	–	11	.389	19	–	16	.543
Connecticut	7	–	11	.389	18	–	16	.529
St. John's	6	–	12	.333	17	–	16	.515
Rutgers	5	–	13	.278	15	–	17	.469
Providence	4	–	14	.222	12	–	19	.387
DePaul	1	–	17	.056	8	–	23	.258
† 2010 Big East tournament winner As of April 3, 2010; Rankings from AP Poll

2009–10 Big Sky men's basketball standings
	Conf.				Overall
Team	W		L	PCT	W		L	PCT
Weber State	13	–	3	.813	20	–	11	.645
Northern Colorado	12	–	4	.750	25	–	7	.781
Montana State	10	–	6	.625	15	–	14	.517
Montana †	10	–	6	.625	22	–	9	.710
Northern Arizona	8	–	8	.500	14	–	14	.500
Portland State	7	–	9	.438	12	–	19	.387
Eastern Washington	5	–	11	.313	9	–	21	.300
Idaho State	4	–	12	.250	7	–	22	.241
Sacramento State	3	–	13	.188	9	–	21	.300
† Conference tournament winner

2009–10 Big South men's basketball standings
	Conf.				Overall
Team	W		L	PCT	W		L	PCT
Coastal Carolina	15	–	3	.833	28	–	7	.800
Radford	13	–	5	.722	19	–	12	.613
Winthrop †	12	–	6	.667	19	–	14	.576
UNC Asheville	11	–	7	.611	15	–	16	.484
High Point	10	–	8	.556	15	–	15	.500
Liberty	10	–	8	.556	15	–	16	.484
Charleston Southern	7	–	11	.389	13	–	17	.433
VMI	5	–	13	.278	10	–	19	.345
Gardner-Webb	5	–	13	.278	8	–	21	.276
Presbyterian	2	–	16	.111	5	–	26	.161
† 2010 Big South tournament winner As of March 16, 2010; Rankings from AP Poll

2009–10 Big Ten Conference men's basketball standings
	Conf.				Overall
Team	W		L	PCT	W		L	PCT
No. 5 Ohio State†	14	–	4	.778	29	–	8	.784
No. 10 Purdue	14	–	4	.778	29	–	6	.829
No. 13 Michigan State	14	–	4	.778	28	–	9	.757
No. 16 Wisconsin	13	–	5	.722	24	–	9	.727
Illinois	10	–	8	.556	21	–	15	.583
Minnesota	9	–	9	.500	21	–	14	.600
Northwestern	7	–	11	.389	20	–	14	.588
Michigan	7	–	11	.389	15	–	17	.469
Indiana	4	–	14	.222	10	–	21	.323
Iowa	4	–	14	.222	10	–	22	.313
Penn State	3	–	15	.167	11	–	20	.355
† 2010 Big Ten tournament winner As of April 3, 2010; Rankings from AP Poll

2009–10 Big 12 men's basketball standings
	Conf.				Overall
Team	W		L	PCT	W		L	PCT
No. 1 Kansas†	15	–	1	.938	33	–	3	.917
No. 7 Kansas State	11	–	5	.688	29	–	8	.784
No. 19 Baylor	11	–	5	.688	28	–	8	.778
No. 23 Texas A&M	11	–	5	.688	24	–	10	.706
Missouri	10	–	6	.625	23	–	11	.676
Texas	9	–	7	.563	24	–	10	.706
Oklahoma State	9	–	7	.563	22	–	11	.667
Colorado	6	–	10	.375	15	–	16	.484
Texas Tech	4	–	12	.250	19	–	16	.543
Iowa State	4	–	12	.250	15	–	17	.469
Oklahoma	4	–	12	.250	13	–	18	.419
Nebraska	2	–	14	.125	15	–	18	.455
† 2010 Big 12 Tournament winner Rankings from AP poll

2009–10 Big West men's basketball standings
	Conf.				Overall
Team	W		L	PCT	W		L	PCT
UC Santa Barbara †	12	–	4	.750	20	–	10	.667
Pacific	12	–	4	.750	23	–	12	.657
Cal State Fullerton	8	–	8	.500	16	–	15	.516
Long Beach State	8	–	8	.500	17	–	16	.515
UC Davis	8	–	8	.500	14	–	18	.438
Cal Poly	7	–	9	.438	12	–	19	.387
UC Irvine	6	–	10	.375	14	–	18	.438
Cal State Northridge	6	–	10	.375	11	–	21	.344
UC Riverside	5	–	11	.313	12	–	17	.414
† 2010 Big West tournament winner As of March 30, 2010; Rankings from AP Poll

2009–10 CAA men's basketball standings
	Conf.				Overall
Team	W		L	PCT	W		L	PCT
Old Dominion †	15	–	3	.833	27	–	9	.750
Northeastern	14	–	4	.778	20	–	13	.606
William & Mary	12	–	6	.667	22	–	11	.667
George Mason	12	–	6	.667	17	–	15	.531
VCU	11	–	7	.611	27	–	9	.750
Drexel	11	–	7	.611	16	–	16	.500
Hofstra	10	–	8	.556	19	–	15	.559
Towson	6	–	12	.333	10	–	21	.323
Georgia State	5	–	13	.278	12	–	20	.375
UNCW	5	–	13	.278	9	–	22	.290
James Madison	4	–	14	.222	13	–	20	.394
Delaware	3	–	15	.167	7	–	24	.226
† 2010 CAA tournament winner Rankings from AP poll

2009–10 Conference USA men's basketball standings
	Conf.				Overall
Team	W		L	PCT	W		L	PCT
UTEP	15	–	1	.938	26	–	7	.788
Memphis	13	–	3	.813	24	–	10	.706
UAB	11	–	5	.688	25	–	9	.735
Marshall	11	–	5	.688	24	–	10	.706
Tulsa	10	–	6	.625	23	–	12	.657
Southern Miss	8	–	8	.500	20	–	13	.606
Houston†	7	–	9	.438	19	–	16	.543
SMU	7	–	9	.438	14	–	17	.452
East Carolina	4	–	12	.250	10	–	21	.323
Tulane	3	–	13	.188	8	–	22	.267
Rice	1	–	15	.063	8	–	23	.258
UCF*	0	–	10	.000	0	–	17	.000
† 2010 CUSA Tournament winner As of March 20, 2010; Rankings from AP Poll; *UCF vacated its wins from the 2010–11 season after it was discovered that there was an ineligible player on the team.

2009–10 Great West Conference men's basketball standings
	Conf.				Overall
Team	W		L	PCT	W		L	PCT
South Dakota †	11	–	1	.917	22	–	10	.688
Houston Baptist	9	–	3	.750	12	–	21	.364
North Dakota	5	–	7	.417	8	–	23	.258
Utah Valley	5	–	7	.417	12	–	18	.400
Texas–Pan American	4	–	8	.333	6	–	27	.182
NJIT	4	–	8	.333	10	–	21	.323
Chicago State	4	–	8	.333	9	–	23	.281
† 2010 Great West tournament winner Rankings from AP Poll

2009–10 Horizon League men's basketball standings
	Conf.				Overall
Team	W		L	PCT	W		L	PCT
No. 11 Butler †	18	–	0	1.000	33	–	5	.868
Wright State	12	–	6	.667	20	–	12	.625
Green Bay	11	–	7	.611	22	–	12	.647
Milwaukee	10	–	8	.556	20	–	14	.588
Cleveland State	10	–	8	.556	16	–	17	.485
Valparaiso	10	–	8	.556	15	–	17	.469
Detroit	9	–	9	.500	20	–	14	.588
Loyola Chicago	5	–	13	.278	14	–	16	.467
UIC	3	–	15	.167	8	–	22	.267
Youngstown State	2	–	16	.111	8	–	22	.267
† 2010 Horizon League Tournament winner As of March 18, 2010; Rankings from AP Poll

2009–10 Ivy League men's basketball standings
	Conf.				Overall
Team	W		L	PCT	W		L	PCT
Cornell	13	–	1	.929	29	–	5	.853
Princeton	11	–	3	.786	22	–	9	.710
Harvard	10	–	4	.714	21	–	9	.700
Yale	6	–	8	.429	12	–	19	.387
Columbia	5	–	9	.357	11	–	17	.393
Brown	5	–	9	.357	11	–	20	.355
Penn	5	–	9	.357	6	–	22	.214
Dartmouth	1	–	13	.071	5	–	23	.179
As of March 21, 2010; Rankings from AP Poll

2009–10 MAAC men's basketball standings
	Conf.				Overall
Team	W		L	PCT	W		L	PCT
Siena †	17	–	1	.944	27	–	7	.794
Fairfield	13	–	5	.722	23	–	11	.676
Iona	12	–	6	.667	21	–	10	.677
Saint Peter's	11	–	7	.611	16	–	14	.533
Rider	9	–	9	.500	17	–	16	.515
Niagara	9	–	9	.500	18	–	15	.545
Canisius	8	–	10	.444	15	–	17	.469
Loyola	6	–	12	.333	13	–	17	.433
Manhattan	4	–	14	.222	11	–	20	.355
Marist	1	–	17	.056	1	–	29	.033
† 2010 MAAC tournament winner Rankings from AP Poll

2009–10 Mid-American Conference men's basketball standings
	Conf.				Overall
Team	W		L	PCT	W		L	PCT
East
Kent State	13	–	3	.813	24	–	10	.706
Akron	12	–	4	.750	24	–	11	.686
Miami	9	–	7	.563	14	–	18	.438
Buffalo	9	–	7	.563	18	–	12	.600
Ohio†	7	–	9	.438	22	–	15	.595
Bowling Green	6	–	10	.375	14	–	16	.467
West
Central Michigan	9	–	7	.563	15	–	15	.500
Eastern Michigan	8	–	8	.500	17	–	15	.531
Western Michigan	8	–	8	.500	18	–	15	.545
Ball State	8	–	8	.500	15	–	15	.500
Northern Illinois	6	–	10	.375	10	–	20	.333
Toledo	1	–	15	.063	4	–	28	.125
† Conference tournament winner Rankings from AP Poll

2009–10 MEAC men's basketball standings
	Conf.				Overall
Team	W		L	PCT	W		L	PCT
Morgan State †	15	–	1	.938	24	–	10	.706
Delaware State	11	–	5	.688	16	–	11	.593
South Carolina State	10	–	6	.625	16	–	13	.552
Norfolk State	9	–	7	.563	11	–	18	.379
Hampton	8	–	8	.500	13	–	17	.433
Maryland Eastern Shore	8	–	8	.500	10	–	20	.333
Bethune–Cookman	7	–	9	.438	16	–	15	.516
Howard	6	–	10	.375	7	–	24	.226
North Carolina A&T	6	–	10	.375	10	–	21	.323
Florida A&M	5	–	11	.313	9	–	21	.300
Coppin St.	3	–	13	.188	8	–	21	.276
† 2010 MEAC tournament winner As of March 19, 2010; Rankings from AP Poll

2009–10 Missouri Valley Conference men's basketball standings
	Conf.				Overall
Team	W		L	PCT	W		L	PCT
Northern Iowa †	15	–	3	.833	30	–	5	.857
Wichita State	12	–	6	.667	25	–	10	.714
Illinois State	11	–	7	.611	22	–	11	.667
Creighton	10	–	8	.556	18	–	16	.529
Bradley	9	–	9	.500	16	–	15	.516
Indiana State	9	–	9	.500	17	–	15	.531
Missouri State	8	–	10	.444	24	–	12	.667
Drake	7	–	11	.389	14	–	19	.424
Southern Illinois	6	–	12	.333	15	–	15	.500
Evansville	3	–	15	.167	9	–	21	.300
† 2010 MVC tournament winner As of March 20, 2010; Rankings from AP Poll

2009–10 Mountain West Conference men's basketball standings
	Conf.				Overall
Team	W		L	PCT	W		L	PCT
No. 8 New Mexico	14	–	2	.875	30	–	5	.857
No. 17 BYU	13	–	3	.813	30	–	6	.833
UNLV	11	–	5	.688	25	–	8	.758
San Diego State†	11	–	5	.688	25	–	9	.735
Colorado State	7	–	9	.438	16	–	16	.500
Utah	7	–	9	.438	14	–	17	.452
TCU	5	–	11	.313	13	–	19	.406
Wyoming	3	–	13	.188	10	–	21	.323
Air Force	1	–	15	.063	10	–	21	.323
† Conference tournament winner As of March 20, 2010; Rankings from AP/Coaches Poll

2009–10 Northeast Conference men's basketball standings
	Conf.				Overall
Team	W		L	PCT	W		L	PCT
Quinnipiac	15	–	3	.833	23	–	9	.719
Robert Morris †	15	–	3	.833	23	–	12	.657
Mount St. Mary's	12	–	6	.667	16	–	15	.516
Long Island	11	–	7	.611	14	–	17	.452
Fairleigh Dickinson	10	–	8	.556	11	–	21	.344
St. Francis (PA)	9	–	9	.500	11	–	19	.367
Central Connecticut	9	–	9	.500	12	–	18	.400
Monmouth	8	–	10	.444	12	–	19	.387
St. Francis (NY)	8	–	10	.444	11	–	18	.379
Sacred Heart	7	–	11	.389	14	–	15	.483
Wagner	3	–	15	.167	5	–	26	.161
Bryant*	1	–	17	.056	1	–	29	.033
† 2010 Northeast Conference tournament winner As of March 17, 2010; Rankings from AP Poll; *Ineligible for conference tournament

2009–10 Ohio Valley Conference men's basketball standings
	Conf.				Overall
Team	W		L	PCT	W		L	PCT
Murray State †	17	–	1	.944	31	–	5	.861
Morehead State	15	–	3	.833	24	–	11	.686
Eastern Illinois	11	–	7	.611	19	–	12	.613
Austin Peay	11	–	7	.611	17	–	15	.531
Eastern Kentucky	11	–	7	.611	20	–	12	.625
Tennessee Tech	8	–	10	.444	15	–	17	.469
Jacksonville State	7	–	11	.389	11	–	19	.367
Tennessee State	6	–	12	.333	9	–	23	.281
Southeast Missouri State	3	–	15	.167	7	–	23	.233
UT Martin	1	–	17	.056	4	–	25	.138
† 2010 OVC tournament winner As of March 22, 2010; Rankings from AP Poll

2009–10 Pacific-10 Conference men's basketball standings
	Conf.				Overall
Team	W		L	PCT	W		L	PCT
California	13	–	5	.722	24	–	11	.686
Arizona State	12	–	6	.667	22	–	11	.667
Washington †	11	–	7	.611	26	–	10	.722
Arizona	10	–	8	.556	16	–	15	.516
USC*	8	–	10	.444	16	–	14	.533
Oregon State	8	–	10	.444	14	–	18	.438
UCLA	8	–	10	.444	14	–	18	.438
Stanford	7	–	11	.389	14	–	17	.452
Oregon	7	–	11	.389	16	–	16	.500
Washington State	6	–	12	.333	16	–	15	.516
† Conference tournament winner As of March 25, 2010; Rankings from AP Poll * Ineligible for conference tournament

2009–10 Patriot League men's basketball standings
	Conf.				Overall
Team	W		L	PCT	W		L	PCT
Lehigh†	10	–	4	.714	19	–	10	.655
Bucknell	9	–	5	.643	14	–	16	.467
Lafayette	8	–	6	.571	17	–	12	.586
American	7	–	7	.500	10	–	19	.345
Navy	7	–	7	.500	13	–	16	.448
Colgate	6	–	8	.429	10	–	18	.357
Holy Cross	5	–	9	.357	8	–	21	.276
Army	4	–	10	.286	14	–	14	.500
† 2010 Patriot League tournament winner As of March 1, 2010; Rankings from AP Poll

2009–10 Southeastern Conference men's basketball standings
	Conf.				Overall
Team	W		L	PCT	W		L	PCT
East
No. 2 Kentucky†	14	–	2	.875	35	–	3	.921
No. 21 Vanderbilt	12	–	4	.750	24	–	9	.727
No. 15 Tennessee	11	–	5	.688	28	–	9	.757
Florida	9	–	7	.563	21	–	13	.618
South Carolina	6	–	10	.375	15	–	16	.484
Georgia	5	–	11	.313	14	–	17	.452
West
Mississippi State	9	–	7	.563	24	–	12	.667
Mississippi	9	–	7	.563	24	–	11	.686
Arkansas	7	–	9	.438	14	–	18	.438
Alabama	6	–	10	.375	17	–	15	.531
Auburn	6	–	10	.375	15	–	17	.469
LSU	2	–	14	.125	11	–	20	.355
† 2010 SEC tournament winner As of March 30, 2010; Rankings from AP Poll

2009–10 Southern Conference men's basketball standings
	Conf.				Overall
Team	W		L	PCT	W		L	PCT
North
Appalachian State	13	–	5	.722	24	–	12	.667
Western Carolina	11	–	7	.611	22	–	12	.647
Chattanooga	6	–	12	.333	15	–	18	.455
UNC Greensboro	6	–	12	.333	8	–	23	.258
Samford	5	–	13	.278	11	–	20	.355
Elon	5	–	13	.278	9	–	23	.281
South
Wofford†	15	–	3	.833	26	–	9	.743
College of Charleston	14	–	4	.778	22	–	12	.647
Davidson	11	–	7	.611	16	–	15	.516
The Citadel	9	–	9	.500	16	–	16	.500
Furman	7	–	11	.389	13	–	17	.433
Georgia Southern	6	–	12	.333	9	–	23	.281
† SoCon Tournament winner As of March 22, 2010; Rankings from AP Poll

2009–10 Southland Conference men's basketball standings
	Conf.				Overall
Team	W		L	PCT	W		L	PCT
East
Stephen F. Austin	11	–	5	.688	23	–	9	.719
Southeastern Louisiana	10	–	6	.625	19	–	12	.613
Nicholls State	7	–	9	.438	11	–	19	.367
Northwestern State	5	–	10	.333	10	–	19	.345
McNeese State	5	–	11	.313	10	–	20	.333
Central Arkansas	3	–	13	.188	9	–	21	.300
West
Sam Houston State†	14	–	2	.875	25	–	8	.758
Texas A&M–Corpus Christi	10	–	6	.625	17	–	15	.531
UTSA	9	–	7	.563	19	–	11	.633
Texas State	9	–	7	.563	15	–	16	.484
Texas–Arlington	8	–	8	.500	16	–	14	.533
Lamar	5	–	11	.313	14	–	18	.438
† 2010 Southland tournament winner As of March 18, 2010; Rankings from AP poll

2009–10 SWAC men's basketball standings
	Conf.				Overall
Team	W		L	PCT	W		L	PCT
Jackson State	17	–	1	.944	19	–	12	.613
Arkansas–Pine Bluff†	16	–	4	.800	17	–	15	.531
Alabama State	12	–	7	.632	15	–	15	.500
Prairie View A&M	11	–	7	.611	16	–	13	.552
Texas Southern	12	–	8	.600	16	–	16	.500
Alabama A&M	8	–	10	.444	11	–	15	.423
Mississippi Valley State	8	–	10	.444	9	–	23	.281
Grambling State	4	–	15	.211	7	–	21	.250
Southern	3	–	15	.167	5	–	25	.167
Alcorn State	2	–	16	.111	2	–	29	.065
† 2010 SWAC tournament winner As of March 13, 2010; Rankings from AP Poll

2009–10 Summit League men's basketball standings
	Conf.				Overall
Team	W		L	PCT	W		L	PCT
Oakland †	17	–	1	.944	26	–	9	.743
IUPUI	15	–	3	.833	25	–	11	.694
Oral Roberts	13	–	5	.722	20	–	13	.606
South Dakota State	10	–	8	.556	14	–	16	.467
IPFW	9	–	9	.500	16	–	15	.516
North Dakota State	8	–	10	.444	11	–	18	.379
Western Illinois	6	–	12	.333	13	–	17	.433
UMKC	6	–	12	.333	12	–	18	.400
Centenary *	3	–	15	.167	8	–	21	.276
Southern Utah	3	–	15	.167	7	–	22	.241
† Conference tournament winner As of March 22, 2010; Rankings from AP Poll * Ineligible for conference tournament

2009–10 Sun Belt Conference men's basketball standings
	Conf.				Overall
Team	W		L	PCT	W		L	PCT
East
Troy	13	–	5	.722	20	–	13	.606
Middle Tennessee	13	–	5	.722	19	–	14	.576
Western Kentucky	12	–	6	.667	21	–	13	.618
Florida Atlantic	10	–	8	.556	14	–	16	.467
South Alabama	8	–	10	.444	17	–	15	.531
FIU	4	–	14	.222	7	–	25	.219
West
North Texas†	13	–	5	.722	24	–	9	.727
Arkansas State	11	–	7	.611	17	–	14	.548
Denver	10	–	8	.556	19	–	13	.594
Louisiana–Lafayette	10	–	8	.556	13	–	17	.433
Louisiana–Monroe	6	–	12	.333	12	–	19	.387
Arkansas–Little Rock	4	–	14	.222	8	–	22	.267
New Orleans	3	–	15	.167	8	–	22	.267
† 2010 Sun Belt Conference tournament winner Rankings from AP Poll

2009–10 West Coast Conference men's basketball standings
	Conf.				Overall
Team	W		L	PCT	W		L	PCT
No. 22 Gonzaga	12	–	2	.857	27	–	7	.794
Saint Mary's†	11	–	3	.786	28	–	6	.824
Portland	10	–	4	.714	21	–	11	.656
San Francisco	7	–	7	.500	12	–	18	.400
Loyola Marymount	7	–	7	.500	18	–	16	.529
San Diego	3	–	11	.214	11	–	21	.344
Santa Clara	3	–	11	.214	11	–	21	.344
Pepperdine	3	–	11	.214	7	–	24	.226
† Conference tournament winner Rankings from AP poll

2009–10 WAC men's basketball standings
	Conf.				Overall
Team	W		L	PCT	W		L	PCT
Utah State	14	–	2	.875	27	–	7	.794
Nevada	11	–	5	.688	21	–	13	.618
New Mexico State†	11	–	5	.688	22	–	11	.667
Louisiana Tech	9	–	7	.563	24	–	11	.686
Fresno State	7	–	9	.438	15	–	18	.455
San Jose State	6	–	10	.375	14	–	17	.452
Idaho	6	–	10	.375	15	–	16	.484
Boise State	5	–	11	.313	15	–	17	.469
Hawai'i	3	–	13	.188	10	–	20	.333
† 2010 WAC tournament winner Rankings from AP Poll

=== Division I independents ===
Seven schools played as Division I independents. However, only Longwood and Savannah State were considered full NCAA Division I schools, as the rest were still in a transition phase from NCAA Division II. Charles Garcia of Seattle was selected for the Lou Henson All-America Team.

2009–10 NCAA Division I men's basketball independents standings
	Conf.				Overall
Team	W		L	PCT	W		L	PCT
Seattle		–		–	17	–	14	.548
Savannah State		–		–	11	–	15	.423
Winston–Salem State		–		–	12	–	17	.414
Longwood		–		–	12	–	19	.387
Cal State Bakersfield		–		–	7	–	22	.241
North Carolina Central		–		–	7	–	22	.241
SIU Edwardsville		–		–	5	–	23	.179
Rankings from AP Poll

=== Informal championships ===
Conference	Regular season winner	Most Valuable Player
Philadelphia Big 5	Temple	Scottie Reynolds, Villanova

Temple finished with a 4–0 record in head-to-head competition among the Philadelphia Big 5.

=== Statistical leaders ===
Source for additional stats categories

Points per game			Rebounds per game			Assists per game			Steals per game		
Player	School	PPG	Player	School	RPG	Player	School	APG	Player	School	SPG
Aubrey Coleman	Houston	25.6	Artsiom Parakhouski	Radford	13.4	Ronald Moore	Siena	7.7	Jay Threatt	Delaware St.	2.8
Adnan Hodžić	Lipscomb	22.7	Kenneth Faried	Morehead St.	13.0	Demetri McCamey	Illinois	7.1	Damian Saunders	Duquesne	2.8
Marquez Haynes	UT Arlington	22.6	Daniel Emerson	Mercer	12.0	John Wall	Kentucky	6.5	Devan Downey	S. Carolina	2.7
Devan Downey	S. Carolina	22.5	Kevin Thompson	Morgan St.	11.8	Johnathon Jones	Oakland	6.4	Chris Jones	Prairie View	2.7
Adrian Oliver	San Jose St.	22.5	Chris Gaston	Fordham	11.4	Greivis Vásquez	Maryland	6.3	Ceola Clark	W. Illinois	2.7

Blocked shots per game			Field goal percentage			Three-Point FG percentage			Free-throw percentage		
Player	School	BPG	Player	School	FG%	Player	School	3FG%	Player	School	FT%
Hassan Whiteside	Marshall	5.4	Adnan Hodžić	Lipscomb	60.4	Jared Stohl	Portland	47.8	Donald Sims	Appalachian St.	95.1
Jarvis Varnado	Miss. St.	4.7	Jeremy Simmons	C of Charleston	59.7	Tommy Freeman	Ohio	47.7	Jerome Randle	California	93.3
Hamady N'Diaye	Rutgers	4.5	Denzel Bowles	James Madison	59.4	Jim Mower	Lafayette	46.5	Luke Babbitt	Nevada	91.7
David Foster	Utah	4.0	Willie Reed	St. Louis	58.7	Frank Davis	Tenn. Tech	44.4	Tyler Haws	BYU	91.7
Ekpe Udoh	Baylor	3.7	Jamal Boykin	California	58.4	Devon Beitzel	N. Colorado	44.4	Paul George	Fresno St.	90.9

== Postseason tournaments ==
=== NCAA tournament ===
The NCAA Tournament tipped off on March 16, 2010, with the opening round game in Dayton, Ohio, and concluded on April 5 at the Lucas Oil Stadium in Indianapolis. Of the 65 teams that were invited to participate, 31 were automatic bids while 34 were at-large bids. The 34 at-large teams came from 11 conferences, with the Big East receiving the most bids – eight. The tournament was marked by a number of significant upsets. The biggest saw Northern Iowa knock off #1 overall seed Kansas 69–67 on an Ali Farokhmanesh three-pointer in the waning seconds. Another surprise was Ivy League champion Cornell making a surprise run to the Sweet 16 – becoming the first Ivy school to win an NCAA tournament game since 1998. Duke made a big run in the NCAA tournament, defeating Arkansas Pine-Bluff (73–44), California (68–53), Purdue (70–57), and Baylor (78–72) in their region. In the semifinals, the Blue Devils routed West Virginia 78–57 to make their 10th championship game appearance. In the end, Duke defeated surprise finalist Butler 61–59, after a three-point attempt by the Bulldogs' Gordon Hayward barely missed at the buzzer. Duke claimed its fourth National title as Blue Devil forward Kyle Singler was named Most Outstanding Player

==== Final Four – Lucas Oil Stadium, Indianapolis, Indiana ====
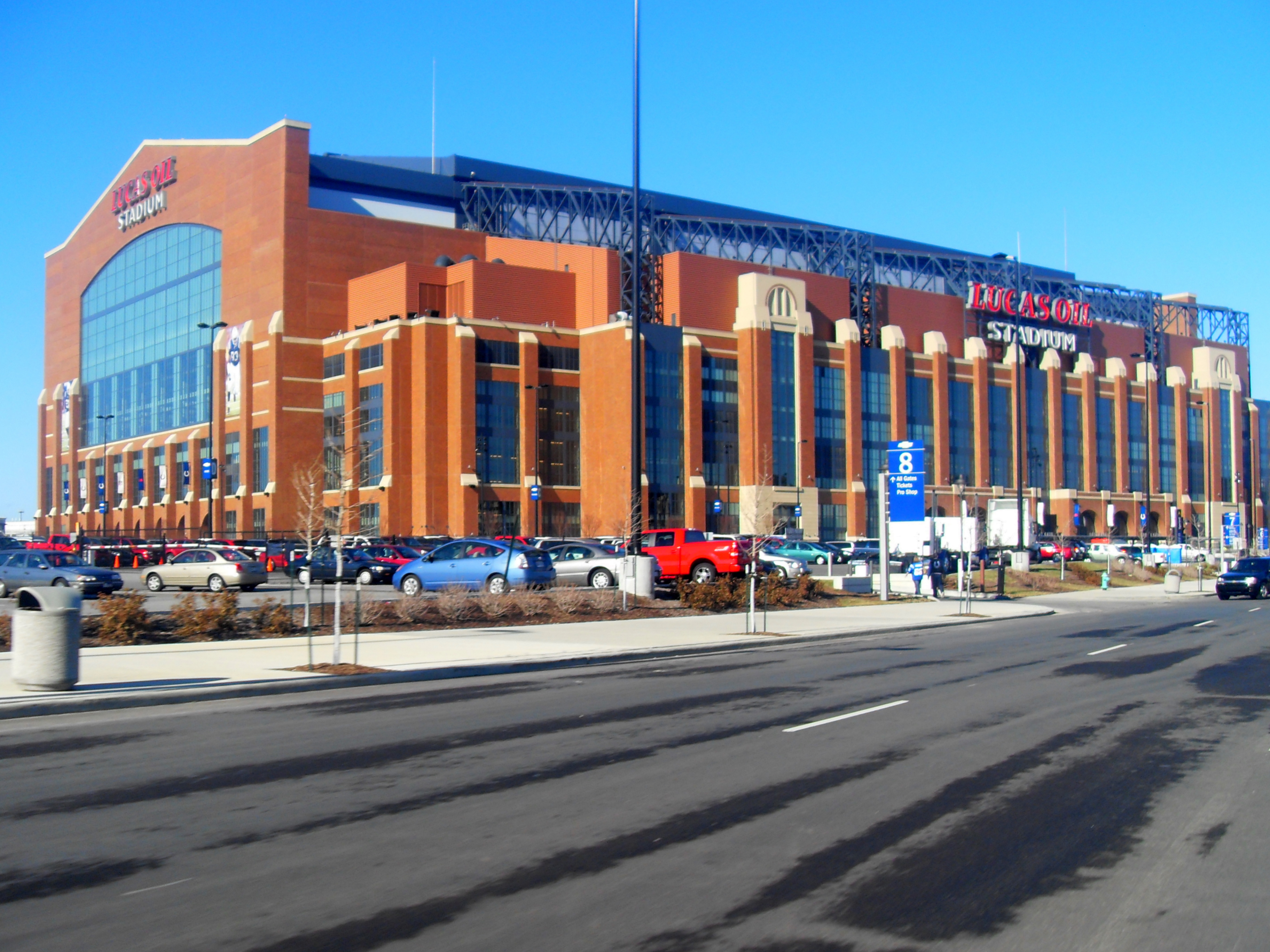
Lucas Oil Stadium in Indianapolis, Indiana, was the site of the season-ending Final Four and National Championship Game for 2009–10.

National Semifinals; April 3
M5	Michigan State	50
W5	Butler	52
E2	West Virginia	57
S1	Duke	78

National Championship Game; April 5
W5	Butler	59
S1	Duke	61

==== Tournament upsets ====
A "major upset" is defined as a win by a team seeded 7 or more spots below its defeated opponent.

Date	Winner	Score	Loser
March 18	#14 Ohio	97–83	#3 Georgetown
March 18	#13 Murray State	66–65	#4 Vanderbilt
March 19	#12 Cornell	78–65	#5 Temple
March 20	#11 Washington	82–64	#3 New Mexico
March 20	#10 Saint Mary's	75–68	#2 Villanova
March 20	#9 Northern Iowa	69–67	#1 Kansas
March 21	#12 Cornell	87–69	#4 Wisconsin

=== National Invitation tournament ===
After the NCAA Tournament field was announced, the National Invitation Tournament invited 32 teams to participate. There was much speculation during the NIT that the NCAA Tournament would expand to 96 teams and that 2010 could be the last NIT after 73 years. (Ultimately, the NCAA decided to expand only to 68 teams, keeping the NIT intact for the near future.) Dayton defeated defending National Champion North Carolina 79–68 in the Final on April 1. The Flyers' Chris Johnson was named tournament Most Outstanding Player.

==== NIT Semifinals and Final ====
Played at Madison Square Garden in New York City

Semifinals; March 30
3	Dayton	68
2	Mississippi	63
2	Rhode Island	67
4	North Carolina (OT)	68

Championship game April 1
3	Dayton	79
4	North Carolina	68

=== College Basketball Invitational ===
The second College Basketball Invitational (CBI) Tournament was held beginning March 16 and ended with a best-of-three final, ending March 31. VCU defeated Saint Louis 2–0 in the final series to win the title. The Rams' Joey Rodriguez was named tournament MVP.

Semifinals (Reseeded)
1	Saint Louis	69
4	Princeton	59
2	Boston University	75
3	VCU	88

Finals (Best of three)
1	Saint Louis	56	65	–
3	VCU	68	71	–

=== CollegeInsider.com tournament ===
The CollegeInsider.com Postseason Tournament was held beginning March 16 and ended with a championship game on March 30. This tournament places an emphasis on selecting successful teams from "mid-major" conferences who were left out of the NCAA Tournament and NIT. Missouri State defeated Pacific 78–65 to win the CIT championship in Springfield, Missouri. The Bears' Will Creekmore was named tournament MVP.

Semi-Finals
Appalachian State	56
Pacific	64
Creighton	61
Missouri State	67

Final
Pacific	65
Missouri State	78

== Award winners ==
=== Consensus All-American teams ===
Consensus First Team
Player	Position	Class	Team
Sherron Collins	PG	Senior	Kansas
Wesley Johnson	SF	Junior	Syracuse
Scottie Reynolds	PG	Senior	Villanova
Evan Turner	SF/SG	Junior	Ohio State
John Wall	PG	Freshman	Kentucky

Consensus Second Team
Player	Position	Class	Team
Cole Aldrich	C	Junior	Kansas
James Anderson	SG	Sophomore	Oklahoma State
DeMarcus Cousins	C	Freshman	Kentucky
Luke Harangody	PF	Senior	Notre Dame
Jon Scheyer	PG	Senior	Duke
Greivis Vasquez	PG	Senior	Maryland

=== Major player of the year awards ===
- Wooden Award: Evan Turner, Ohio State
- Naismith Award: Evan Turner, Ohio State
- Associated Press Player of the Year: Evan Turner, Ohio State
- NABC Player of the Year: Evan Turner, Ohio State
- Oscar Robertson Trophy (USBWA): Evan Turner, Ohio State
- Adolph Rupp Trophy: John Wall, Kentucky
- Sporting News Player of the Year: Evan Turner, Ohio State

=== Major freshman of the year awards ===
- USBWA Freshman of the Year: John Wall, Kentucky
- Sporting News Freshman of the Year: John Wall, Kentucky

=== Major coach of the year awards ===
- Associated Press Coach of the Year: Jim Boeheim, Syracuse
- Henry Iba Award (USBWA): Jim Boeheim, Syracuse
- NABC Coach of the Year: Jim Boeheim, Syracuse
- Naismith College Coach of the Year: Jim Boeheim, Syracuse
- Adolph Rupp Cup: John Calipari, Kentucky
- Sporting News Coach of the Year: Jim Boeheim, Syracuse

=== Other major awards ===
- Bob Cousy Award (Best point guard): Greivis Vásquez, Maryland
- Pete Newell Big Man Award (Best big man): Greg Monroe, Georgetown
- NABC Defensive Player of the Year: Jarvis Varnado, Mississippi State
- Frances Pomeroy Naismith Award (Best player 6'0"/1.83 m or shorter): Sherron Collins, Kansas
- Lowe's Senior CLASS Award (top senior): Da'Sean Butler, West Virginia
- Robert V. Geasey Trophy (Top player in Philadelphia Big 5): Scottie Reynolds, Villanova
- NIT/Haggerty Award (Top player in New York City metro area): Charles Jenkins, Hofstra
- Elite 88 Award (Top GPA among upperclass players at Final Four): Matt Howard, Butler
- Chip Hilton Player of the Year Award (Strong personal character): Román Martínez, New Mexico

=== CollegeInsider.com awards ===
- Ben Jobe Award (Top minority coach): Ed Cooley, Fairfield
- Hugh Durham Award (Top mid-major coach): Mike Young, Wofford
- Jim Phelan Award (Top head coach): Jamie Dixon, Pittsburgh
- Lefty Driesell Award (Top defensive player): Jarvis Varnado, Mississippi State
- Lou Henson Award (Top mid-major player): Keith Benson, Oakland
- Lute Olson Award (Top non-freshman or transfer player): Sherron Collins, Kansas
- Skip Prosser Man of the Year Award (Coach with moral character): Bob Marlin, Sam Houston State

== Coaching changes ==
A number of teams changed coaches throughout the season and after the season ended.

Team	Former Coach	Interim Coach	New Coach	Reason
Appalachian State	Buzz Peterson		Jason Capel	Peterson left his second stint with Appalachian State after one season to move across the state to UNC Wilmington.
Auburn	Jeff Lebo		Tony Barbee	Lebo was fired after missing the NCAA tournament in each of his six seasons. He went on to be hired by East Carolina.
Boise State	Greg Graham		Leon Rice	Graham was fired after his first losing season in his eight-year tenure at Boise amid the lowest season-ticket sales in the program's modern history. He was replaced by Rice, Mark Few's top assistant at Gonzaga.
Boston College	Al Skinner		Steve Donahue	Skinner was fired after 13 years at BC.
Centenary	Greg Gary		Adam Walsh	Gary was fired.
Central Arkansas	Rand Chappell		Corliss Williamson	Former Arkansas Razorbacks star Williamson was hired to relieve Chappell.
Charlotte	Bobby Lutz		Alan Major	Lutz was fired after the 49ers went in a month from sole possession of first place in the A-10 to not making either the NCAA Tournament or NIT. Lutz would eventually be hired by new Iowa State coach Fred Hoiberg.
Chicago State	Benjy Taylor		Tracy Dildy	
The Citadel	Ed Conroy		Chuck Driesell	
Clemson	Oliver Purnell		Brad Brownell	Purnell left for the DePaul job after taking Clemson to three straight NCAA Tournaments for only the second time in school history.
Colorado	Jeff Bzdelik		Tad Boyle	Bzdelik left to work for old Northwestern colleague Ron Wellman at Wake Forest.
Columbia	Joe Jones		Kyle Smith	Jones left to become Associate Head Coach at Boston College.
Cornell	Steve Donahue		Bill Courtney	Donahue left for the Boston College job after guiding Cornell to three straight Ivy League crowns and an NCAA Sweet 16 appearance.
Creighton	Dana Altman		Greg McDermott	Altman left to become Head Coach at Oregon.
Dartmouth	Terry Dunn	Mark Graupe	Paul Cormier	Dunn resigned after a 3–10 start.
DePaul	Jerry Wainwright	Tracy Webster	Oliver Purnell	Wainwright was fired after losing his 22nd straight regular season Big East Conference game.
East Carolina	Mack McCarthy		Jeff Lebo	McCarthy stepped down after three seasons to take a fundraising position in the university's athletic department, specifically aimed at an on-campus basketball practice facility.
Fordham	Dereck Whittenburg	Jared Grasso	Tom Pecora	Whittenburg was fired after a 1–4 start.
Gardner–Webb	Rick Scruggs		Chris Holtmann	Scruggs was fired after 15 years at Gardner-Webb.
Green Bay	Tod Kowalczyk		Brian Wardle	Kowalczyk left for the Toledo job.
Hartford	Dan Leibovitz		John Gallagher	Leibovitz resigned with four years left on his contract to become top assistant at Penn.
Hawaii	Bob Nash		Gib Arnold	
Holy Cross	Sean Kearney		Milan Brown	Kearney was fired after only one year.
Hofstra	Tom Pecora		Mo Cassara	Former Providence coach Tim Welsh was hired but then resigned a month later after a DWI arrest.
Houston	Tom Penders		James Dickey	Penders resigned after six seasons, apparently feeling he had done his job after leading the Cougars to their first NCAA appearance since 1992.
Howard	Gil Jackson		Kevin Nickelberry	
Illinois-Chicago	Jimmy Collins		Howard Moore	Collins retired in the Summer before the 2010–11 season.
Indiana State	Kevin McKenna		Greg Lansing	
Iona	Kevin Willard		Tim Cluess	
Iowa	Todd Lickliter		Fran McCaffery	Lickliter was fired after a three-year tenure that saw three losing seasons, with four players transferring out of Iowa after the 2008–09 season and a fifth leaving during this season.
Iowa State	Greg McDermott		Fred Hoiberg	McDermott made the unusual move to Creighton and the MVC and was replaced by Hoiberg, who grew up in Ames and starred for the Cyclones, where he became known as "The Mayor".
Louisiana–Lafayette	Robert Lee		Bob Marlin	Lee was fired after six seasons in Lafayette and a 13–16 record in his final season. The Ragin' Cajuns program was plagued by academic problems that resulted in lost scholarships in each of Lee's three final seasons.
Louisiana–Monroe	Orlando Early		Keith Richard	Early left to become an assistant at South Carolina.
Marshall	Donnie Jones		Tom Herrion	Jones moved within Conference USA, to UCF.
Mount St. Mary's	Milan Brown		Robert Burke	
Northern Colorado	Tad Boyle		B. J. Hill	
Oregon	Ernie Kent		Dana Altman	Duck alum Kent, the school's winningest coach in history, was fired after two weeks of speculation. The Ducks had gone 24–39 in Kent's last two seasons, and saw a significant drop in attendance, with a new arena set to open during the 2010–11 season.
Penn	Glen Miller		Jerome Allen	Miller was fired after a 0–7 start and replaced by former Penn star (and assistant coach) Allen.
Robert Morris	Mike Rice		Andy Toole	Rice left after three straight 20+ win seasons to take the head coach job at Rutgers.
Rutgers	Fred Hill		Mike Rice	Hill resigned after a lack of progress in the program, including the transfer of star Mike Rosario after the season's end.
Sam Houston State	Bob Marlin		Jason Hooten	Marlin left to take the Louisiana-Lafayette opening.
Seton Hall	Bobby Gonzalez		Kevin Willard	Gonzalez was fired with the AD citing both his conduct and that of forward Herb Pope, who punched an opposing player twice in Seton Hall's NIT loss to Texas Tech.
Siena	Fran McCaffery		Mitch Buonaguro	Siena promoted top assistant Buonaguro after Iowa hired away McCaffery.
St. Francis (NY)	Brian Nash		Glenn Braica	
St. John's	Norm Roberts		Steve Lavin	St. John's fired Roberts after failing to make the NCAA Tournament, later hiring ESPN announcer and former UCLA coach Lavin.
Toledo	Gene Cross		Tod Kowalczyk	
Tulane	Dave Dickerson		Ed Conroy	
UC Irvine	Pat Douglass		Russell Turner	
UCF	Kirk Speraw		Donnie Jones	Speraw, the school's winningest coach, was fired after a disappointing 15–17 season. The Knights had not made the NCAA Tournament since 2005.
UNC Wilmington	Benny Moss	Brooks Lee	Buzz Peterson	Moss was reassigned to a new position in the UNCW athletic department after a 7–14 start.
UTEP	Tony Barbee		Tim Floyd	Barbee left for Auburn and the SEC.
Wagner	Mike Deane		Dan Hurley	Deane was fired after a 5–26 season.
Wake Forest	Dino Gaudio		Jeff Bzdelik	Gaudio was fired after a 1–6 postseason record in his three years.
Wright State	Brad Brownell		Billy Donlon	Brownell left for the Clemson job.
