= 2010 Summit League men's basketball tournament =

- Classification: Division I
- Season: 2009–10
- Teams: 8
- Site: Sioux Falls Arena; Sioux Falls, South Dakota
- Champions: Oakland (2nd title)
- Winning coach: Greg Kampe (2nd title)
- MVP: Derick Nelson (Oakland)
- Top scorer: Robert Glenn (IUPUI) (66 points)

2009–10 Summit League men's basketball standings
	Conf.				Overall
Team	W		L	PCT	W		L	PCT
Oakland †	17	–	1	.944	26	–	9	.743
IUPUI	15	–	3	.833	25	–	11	.694
Oral Roberts	13	–	5	.722	20	–	13	.606
South Dakota State	10	–	8	.556	14	–	16	.467
IPFW	9	–	9	.500	16	–	15	.516
North Dakota State	8	–	10	.444	11	–	18	.379
Western Illinois	6	–	12	.333	13	–	17	.433
UMKC	6	–	12	.333	12	–	18	.400
Centenary *	3	–	15	.167	8	–	21	.276
Southern Utah	3	–	15	.167	7	–	22	.241
† Conference tournament winner As of March 22, 2010; Rankings from AP Poll * Ineligible for conference tournament

The 2010 Summit League men's basketball tournament was the 2010 post-season tournament for The Summit League, an NCAA Division I athletic conference. It was won by conference regular season champion Oakland University. Oakland defeated #2 seed IUPUI in the finals 76–64 behind Derick Nelson's career high 38 points.

Nelson was named tournament MVP and was joined by teammates Keith Benson and Johnathon Jones on the All-Tournament Team. Robert Glenn, the leading scorer for the tournament and Alex Young, both of IUPUI rounded out the All-Tournament Team.

The tournament took place March 6–9, 2010 at Sioux Falls Arena in Sioux Falls, South Dakota.

== Format ==
Out of the league's 10 teams, the top eight receive berths in the conference tournament. After the 18-game conference season, teams are seeded by conference record, with tiebreakers used if necessary in the following order:

1. Head-to-head competition
2. Winning percentage vs. ranked conference teams (starting with #1 and moving down until the tie is broken)
3. Ratings Percentage Index

== Bracket ==
Quarterfinals; March 6–7
1	Oakland	85
8	UMKC	70
4	South Dakota State	66
5	IPFW	71
2	IUPUI	77
7	Western Illinois	68
3	Oral Roberts	65
6	North Dakota State	64 ^{OT}

Semifinals; March 8
1	Oakland	71
5	IPFW	58
2	IUPUI	69
3	Oral Roberts	65

Final; March 9
1	Oakland	76
2	IUPUI	64
