= 2009–10 Summit League men's basketball season =

2009–10 The Summit League men's basketball season
- League: NCAA Division I
- Sport: Basketball
- Duration: November 13, 2009 through March 13, 2010
- Teams: 10
- Regular season champion: Oakland University
- Season MVP: Keith Benson (Oakland)

Basketball seasons
- ← 2008–09 2010–11 →

2009–10 Summit League men's basketball standings
| | Conf. | | | | Overall |
| Team | W | | L | PCT | W | | L | PCT |
|---|---|---|---|---|---|---|---|---|
| Oakland † | 17 | – | 1 | .944 | 26 | – | 9 | .743 |
| IUPUI | 15 | – | 3 | .833 | 25 | – | 11 | .694 |
| Oral Roberts | 13 | – | 5 | .722 | 20 | – | 13 | .606 |
| South Dakota State | 10 | – | 8 | .556 | 14 | – | 16 | .467 |
| IPFW | 9 | – | 9 | .500 | 16 | – | 15 | .516 |
| North Dakota State | 8 | – | 10 | .444 | 11 | – | 18 | .379 |
| Western Illinois | 6 | – | 12 | .333 | 13 | – | 17 | .433 |
| UMKC | 6 | – | 12 | .333 | 12 | – | 18 | .400 |
| Centenary * | 3 | – | 15 | .167 | 8 | – | 21 | .276 |
| Southern Utah | 3 | – | 15 | .167 | 7 | – | 22 | .241 |
† Conference tournament winner As of March 22, 2010; Rankings from AP Poll * Ineligible for conference tournament

The 2009–10 The Summit League men's basketball season is the 28th college basketball season in the conference's existence. The conference features ten teams that are competing for The Summit League regular season and tournament titles.

== Pre-season ==
Oakland University was picked to win The Summit League championship, receiving 34 of the 35 first place votes. The vote was conducted by league coaches, SIDs and media. Oakland senior point guard Johnathon Jones was chosen as Pre-season Player of the year. The complete preseason poll was as follows:

1. Oakland (34 first place votes), 520 votes
2. Oral Roberts, 426
3. IUPUI (1), 422
4. South Dakota State, 401
5. North Dakota State, 303
6. IPFW, 265
7. Southern Utah, 250
8. Western Illinois, 176
9. UMKC, 141
10. Centenary, 89

Jones was joined on the Pre-season All-League First Team by Oakland center Keith Benson and forward Derick Nelson, Southern Utah guard Davis Baker, South Dakota State guard Garrett Callahan and IUPUI forward Robert Glenn. Named to the second team were SDSU forward Anthony Cordova, Oral Roberts forwards Kevin Ford and Dominique Morrison, North Dakota State forward Michael Tveidt and IPFW forward Deilvez Yearby.

== Records ==
Oakland's Jones became The Summit League's all-time leading assists leader with 11 assists against Central Arkansas on November 28, 2009. Jones broke the record of 626 held by Bryce Drew of Valparaiso.

Oakland tied the league record for consecutive regular season win with their 16th victory in a row against South Dakota State. The 16 wins span two seasons and tied the Cleveland State team that won 16 in a row in 1992 and 1993.

== Non-conference games ==
In non-conference wins against "major" conferences, Oral Roberts defeated No. 12 ranked and undefeated New Mexico 75–66. ORU also defeated Stanford (Pacific-10 Conference) 83–81 on Stanford's home court. ORU's victory over Stanford was the third consecutive season and fourth in the last five seasons that a Summit League team has defeated a Pac-10 Conference team. Oakland defeated Oregon in 2007–08 and 2008–09, ORU beat USC in the 2005 Great Alaska Shootout and Southern Utah defeated Washington State in 2003–04. In its third "upset" of the season, ORU defeated Big 12 Conference opponent Missouri 60–59.

South Dakota State is the only other Summit League school to defeat a "major" conference team, defeating Wyoming (Mountain West Conference) 77–61.

Through February 9, 2010, the conference as a whole was 32–61 (.344) in Division I non-conference games and 20–0 in games against non-Division I opponents.

== Player of the week award ==
The following table lists each of The Summit League's players of the week award winners (number of weeks won in parentheses):

| Week | Player | Position | School |
|---|---|---|---|
| 1 | Robert Glenn | F | IUPUI |
| 2 | Deilvez Yearby | F | IPFW |
| 3 | Keith Benson | C | Oakland |
| 4 | Robert Glenn (2) | F | IUPUI |
| 5 | Keith Benson (2) | C | Oakland |
| 6 | Robert Glenn (3) | F | IUPUI |
| 6 | Deilvez Yearby (2) | F | IPFW |
| 7 | Michael Craion | F | Oral Roberts |
| 8 | Keith Benson (3) | C | Oakland |
| 9 | Davis Baker | G | Southern Utah |

| Week | Player | Position | School |
|---|---|---|---|
| 10 | Warren Niles | G | Oral Roberts |
| 10 | Deilvez Yearby (3) | F | IPFW |
| 11 | Keith Benson (4) | C | Oakland |
| 12 | Robert Glenn (4) | F | IUPUI |
| 13 | Warren Niles (2) | G | Oral Roberts |
| 14 | Ceola Clark | G | Western Illinois |
| 14 | Robert Glenn (5) | F | IUPUI |
| 15 | Robert Glenn (6) | F | IUPUI |
| 15 | Johnathon Jones | G | Oakland |
| 16 | Keith Benson (5) | C | Oakland |

== Post-season ==
The conference tournament took place in Sioux Falls Arena in Sioux Falls, South Dakota from March 6 through March 9, 2010. This was the second year the conference tournament took place in Sioux Falls and was under contract to continue to host the tournament through 2012.
