= 2009–10 East Tennessee State Buccaneers men's basketball team =

American college basketball season

2009–10 East Tennessee State Buccaneers men's basketball
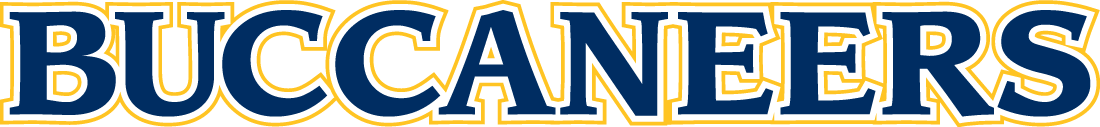

A-Sun tournament champion

NCAA tournament, Round of 64
- Conference: Atlantic Sun Conference
- Record: 20–15 (13–7 A-Sun)
- Head coach: Murry Bartow (5th season)
- Home arena: Memorial Center

2009–10 Atlantic Sun men's basketball standings
	Conf.				Overall
Team	W		L	PCT	W		L	PCT
Lipscomb	14	–	6	.700	17	–	13	.567
Jacksonville	14	–	6	.700	18	–	11	.621
Belmont	14	–	6	.700	19	–	11	.633
Campbell	14	–	6	.700	19	–	10	.655
East Tennessee State †	13	–	7	.650	17	–	14	.548
Mercer	10	–	10	.500	14	–	16	.467
North Florida	8	–	12	.400	13	–	17	.433
Kennesaw State	7	–	13	.350	13	–	19	.406
USC Upstate	6	–	14	.300	6	–	23	.207
Florida Gulf Coast	5	–	15	.250	8	–	21	.276
Stetson	5	–	15	.250	7	–	22	.241
† 2010 Atlantic Sun Tournament winner As of March 2, 2010; Rankings from AP Poll

The 2009–10 East Tennessee State Buccaneers men's basketball team represented East Tennessee State University in the 2009–10 NCAA Division I men's basketball season. The Buccaneers, led by head coach Murry Bartow, played their home games at the Memorial Center in Johnson City, Tennessee, as members of the Atlantic Sun Conference. After finishing 5th in the conference regular season standings, the Buccaneers won the A-Sun tournament to earn an automatic bid to the NCAA tournament as No. 16 seed in the East region. East Tennessee State was beaten by No. 1 seed Kentucky in the opening round, 100–71.

== Roster ==
2009–10 East Tennessee State Buccaneers men's basketball team
Players
Coaches

Pos.	#	Name	Height	Weight	Year	Hometown
G	3	Justin Tubbs	6 ft 3 in (1.91 m)	205 lb (93 kg)	Jr	Trussville, Alabama
G	13	Tommy Hubbard	6 ft 4 in (1.93 m)	210 lb (95 kg)	Jr	Boston, Massachusetts
G	30	Micah Williams	6 ft 4 in (1.93 m)	220 lb (100 kg)	Jr	Manchester, Tennessee

Head coach

- Murry Bartow (UAB)

Assistant coach(es)

Legend

- (C) Team captain
- (S) Suspended
- (I) Ineligible
- (W) Walk-on
- Injured
- Current redshirt

Roster

== Schedule and results ==
Date time, TV	Rank^{#}	Opponent^{#}	Result	Record	Site (attendance) city, state
Regular season
Nov 14, 2009*		Appalachian State	W 62–58	1–0	Memorial Center (5,562); Johnson City, Tennessee
Nov 17, 2009*		at Chattanooga	L 76–85	1–1	McKenzie Arena (4,037); Chattanooga, Tennessee
Nov 19, 2009*		at Morgan State	L 61–72	1–2	Hill Field House (1,032); Baltimore, Maryland
Nov 21, 2009*		at No. 20 Louisville	L 56–69	1–3	Freedom Hall (19,179); Louisville, Kentucky
Nov 25, 2009*		College of Charleston	W 77–71	2–3	Memorial Center (3,105); Johnson City, Tennessee
Nov 27, 2009*		at Arkansas	W 94–85	3–3	Bud Walton Arena (13,794); Fayetteville, Arkansas
Nov 29, 2009		North Florida	W 82–56	4–3 (1–0)	Memorial Center (3,025); Johnson City, Tennessee
Dec 2, 2009*		at No. 11 Tennessee	L 66–78	4–4	Thompson-Boling Arena (17,512); Knoxville, Tennessee
Dec 4, 2009*		at UAB	L 52–74	4–5	Bartow Arena (6,411); Birmingham, Alabama
Dec 10, 2009*		North Georgia	W 75–71	5–5	Memorial Center (2,972); Johnson City, Tennessee
Dec 12, 2009*		Murray State	L 57–61	5–6	Memorial Center (2,888); Johnson City, Tennessee
Dec 18, 2009*		at Morehead State	L 58–60	5–7	Ellis Johnson Arena (1,746); Morehead, Kentucky
Dec 21, 2009*		Jacksonville	W 93–70	6–7 (2–0)	Memorial Center (3,271); Johnson City, Tennessee
Jan 4, 2010		at USC Upstate	W 63–62	7–7 (3–0)	G.B. Hodge Center (591); Valley Falls, South Carolina
Jan 7, 2010		at Kennesaw State	W 63–46	8–7 (4–0)	KSU Convocation Center (562); Kennesaw, Georgia
Jan 9, 2010		at Mercer	L 78–83	8–8 (4–1)	University Center (2,377); Macon, Georgia
Jan 14, 2010		Stetson	L 52–54	8–9 (4–2)	Memorial Center (4,003); Johnson City, Tennessee
Jan 16, 2010		Florida Gulf Coast	W 73–51	9–9 (5–2)	Memorial Center (3,634); Johnson City, Tennessee
Jan 21, 2010		at Lipscomb	W 71–69	10–9 (6–2)	Allen Arena (2,143); Nashville, Tennessee
Jan 23, 2010		at Belmont	L 89–100	10–10 (6–3)	Curb Event Center (2,011); Nashville, Tennessee
Jan 27, 2010		Campbell	W 72–57	11–10 (7–3)	Memorial Center (3,591); Johnson City, Tennessee
Jan 30, 2010		Lipscomb	L 84–85 ^{OT}	11–11 (7–4)	Memorial Center (3,286); Johnson City, Tennessee
Feb 1, 2010		Belmont	L 67–74	11–12 (7–5)	Memorial Center (4,137); Johnson City, Tennessee
Feb 4, 2010		at Florida Gulf Coast	W 56–47	12–12 (8–5)	Alico Arena (1,859); Fort Myers, Florida
Feb 6, 2010		at Stetson	W 75–60	13–12 (9–5)	Edmunds Center (1,279); DeLand, Florida
Feb 12, 2010		Kennesaw State	W 66–45	14–12 (10–5)	Memorial Center (3,471); Johnson City, Tennessee
Feb 14, 2010		Mercer	L 77–82	14–13 (10–6)	Memorial Center (3,151); Johnson City, Tennessee
Feb 19, 2010		at Campbell	L 57–79	14–14 (10–7)	John W. Pope Jr. Convocation Center (3,023); Buies Creek, North Carolina
Feb 21, 2010		USC Upstate	W 63–56	15–14 (11–7)	Memorial Center (3,560); Johnson City, Tennessee
Feb 25, 2010		at North Florida	W 61–46	16–14 (12–7)	UNF Arena (1,061); Jacksonville, Florida
Feb 27, 2010		at Jacksonville	W 64–62	17–14 (13–7)	Jacksonville Veterans Memorial Arena (3,145); Jacksonville, Florida
SoCon tournament
Mar 4, 2010*		vs. Campbell; Quarterfinals	W 72–64	18–14	University Center (929); Macon, Georgia
Mar 5, 2010*		vs. Kennesaw State; Semifinals	W 69–64	19–14	University Center; Macon, Georgia
Mar 6, 2010*		at Mercer; Championship Game	W 72–66	20–14	University Center (3,200); Macon, Georgia
NCAA tournament
Mar 18, 2010*	(16 E)	vs. (1 E) No. 2 Kentucky; First Round	L 71–100	20–15	New Orleans Arena (10,984); New Orleans, Louisiana
*Non-conference game. ^{#}Rankings from AP poll. (#) Tournament seedings in parentheses. E=East. All times are in Eastern.
