= 2009–10 Oakland Golden Grizzlies men's basketball team =

American college basketball season

2009–10 Oakland Golden Grizzlies men's basketball

The Summit League regular season champions The Summit League tournament champions

NCAA tournament, Round of 64
- Conference: The Summit League
- Record: 26–9 (17–1 Summit)
- Head coach: Greg Kampe
- Assistant coaches: Jeff Tungate; Darren Sorenson; Saddi Washington
- Home arena: Athletics Center O'rena

2009–10 Summit League men's basketball standings
	Conf.				Overall
Team	W		L	PCT	W		L	PCT
Oakland †	17	–	1	.944	26	–	9	.743
IUPUI	15	–	3	.833	25	–	11	.694
Oral Roberts	13	–	5	.722	20	–	13	.606
South Dakota State	10	–	8	.556	14	–	16	.467
IPFW	9	–	9	.500	16	–	15	.516
North Dakota State	8	–	10	.444	11	–	18	.379
Western Illinois	6	–	12	.333	13	–	17	.433
UMKC	6	–	12	.333	12	–	18	.400
Centenary *	3	–	15	.167	8	–	21	.276
Southern Utah	3	–	15	.167	7	–	22	.241
† Conference tournament winner As of March 22, 2010; Rankings from AP Poll * Ineligible for conference tournament

The 2009–10 Oakland Golden Grizzlies men's basketball team were a National Collegiate Athletic Association Division I college basketball team representing Oakland University. Oakland finished the season 26–9 overall, 17–1 in The Summit League and were the league's regular season and conference tournament champions. The Golden Grizzlies received The Summit League's automatic berth into the NCAA tournament and, as a No. 14 seed, lost to No. 3 Pittsburgh in the first round.

== Preseason ==
Oakland was picked to win The Summit League championship, receiving 34 of the 35 first place votes. The Golden Grizzlies returned three starters from the 2008–09 team, plus senior Derick Nelson, who sat out the majority of the previous season due to a foot injury.

Also returning for Oakland was senior point guard Johnathon Jones, who led all Division I players in assists and junior center Keith Benson, who was being projected as a first round National Basketball Association draft pick. Benson, Jones and Nelson were each selected to The Summit League's pre-season all-league teams with Jones being selected as the pre-season Player of the Year.

Oakland's schedule included road games against the pre-season consensus number one and two teams, Kansas and Michigan State.

== Season ==
Oakland finished the non-conference portion of its schedule with a 6–7 record. OU lost all if its games against BCS conference teams (0–5) and went 6–2 against the rest of the schedule, with losses coming against Eastern Michigan and Memphis.

The Golden Grizzlies opened The Summit League schedule by winning their first nine games, marking the best start in league history. During the steak, Oakland defeated Oral Roberts 67–64, earning its first win at the Mabee Center in 10 years. The loss was just ORU’s sixth Summit League home defeat in its last 59 games.

=== Records ===
Jones became The Summit League's all-time leading assists leader with 11 assists against Central Arkansas on November 28, 2009. Jones broke the record of 626 held by Bryce Drew of Valparaiso.

Jones broke the conference and school records for consecutive free throws, having made 43 in a row from December 5 through January 23. Jones broke the school record of 33, set by Scott Bittinger in the 1987–88 season.

Jones also set Oakland school records for career games played and career games started. Jones passed Patrick McCloskey for most games played with 125 from 2004 to 2008 and Dan Champagne, who set the previous record of 113 games started from 1997 to 2002.

Oakland tied The Summit League's record for consecutive regular season win with their 16th victory in a row against South Dakota State. The 16 wins span two seasons and tied the Cleveland State team that won 16 in a row in 1992 and 1993.

=== Milestones ===
Benson became the 28th player in Oakland history to score at least 1,000 career points, reaching the milestone during a 99–53 victory over Southern Utah. Current teammates Jones (1,674 points) and Nelson (1,529 points) are also members of the 1,000-point club.

Jones scored his 1,500th career point in a January 24 victory against South Dakota State. Nelson reached the 1,500th point mark during the finals of The Summit League tournament where he led Oakland to the title with a career-high 36 points. Jones was the 15th and Nelson the 16th player in Oukland history to join the 1,500-point club.

=== Roster ===
No.	Name	Pos.	Height	Weight	Year	Hometown (Previous school)
3	Travis Bader *	G	6'3"	164	Fr.	Okemos, MI (Okemos)
34	Keith Benson	C	6'11"	221	Jr.	Farmington Hills, MI (Country Day)
22	Blake Cushingberry	G	6'3"	243	So.	Romeo, MI (Romeo)
12	Ledrick Eackles	G	6'1"	184	Fr.	Zachary, LA (Zachary)
4	Reggie Hamilton *	G	5'11"	175	Jr.	Harvey, IL (UMKC)
11	Will Hudson	F	6'9"	233	Jr.	Madison, WI (Middleton)
23	Johnathon Jones	G	5'11"	160	Sr.	Okemos, MI (Okemos)
33	John Kast	G	6'2"	181	Sr.	Clarkston, MI (Clarkston)
32	Drew Maynard	G	6'6"	231	So.	Lake Orion, MI (Lake Orion)
50	Ilija Milutinovic	C	7'0"	247	So.	Niš, Serbia (Milestone Christian Academy (MO))
1	Derick Nelson	F	6'5"	236	Sr.	Lansing, MI (Bridgton Academy)
44	Jay Thames	F	6'8"	202	Fr.	Port Huron, MI (Port Huron Northern)
15	Drew Valentine	F	6'4"	212	Fr.	Lansing, MI (Sexton)
2	Larry Wright	G	6'2"	162	Jr.	Saginaw, MI (St. John's)

* Redshirting 2009–10 season

=== Schedule ===
Date time, TV	Rank^{#}	Opponent^{#}	Result	Record	Site (attendance) city, state
Exhibition
November 10, 2009*; 7:00pm		Hope	W 97–62		Athletics Center O'rena (1,115); Rochester, MI
Regular season
November 14, 2009*; 7:00pm		Eastern Michigan	L 77–81	0–1	Athletics Center O'rena (3,115); Rochester, MI
November 18, 2009*; 8:00pm		at Wisconsin	L 42–58	0–2	Kohl Center (17,230); Madison, WI
November 21, 2009*; 6:00pm		Rochester	W 97–63	1–2	Athletics Center O'rena (2,315); Rochester, MI
November 23, 2009*; 8:00pm		at Tennessee Tech; Hall of Fame Showcase	W 77–56	2–2	Eblen Center (901); Cookeville, TN
November 25, 2009*; 8:00pm, ESPN Full Court		at No. 1 Kansas; Hall of Fame Showcase	L 59–89	2–3	Allen Fieldhouse (16,300); Lawrence, KS
November 28, 2009*; 6:00pm		Central Arkansas; Hall of Fame Showcase	W 83–75	3–3	Athletics Center O'rena (2,095); Rochester, MI
November 30, 2009*; 8:00pm, WKNO		at Memphis; Hall of Fame Showcase	L 46–77	3–4	FedExForum (15,689); Memphis, TN
December 5, 2009; 7:00pm		at IPFW	W 84–76	4–4 (1–0)	Memorial Coliseum (3,426); Fort Wayne, IN
December 10, 2009*; 7:00pm, Big Ten Network		at No. 12 Michigan State	L 57–88	4–5	Breslin Center (14,759); East Lansing, MI
December 13, 2009*; 4:30pm, Fox Sports Detroit		Green Bay	W 76–52	5–5	Athletics Center O'rena (2,355); Rochester, MI
December 17, 2009*; 10:10pm		at Seattle	W 77–68	6–5	KeyArena (2,243); Seattle, WA
December 19, 2009*; 10:30pm, CSN Northwest		at Oregon	L 60–72	6–6	McArthur Court (6,121); Eugene, OR
December 22, 2009*; 7:00pm, TWCS		at No. 5 Syracuse	L 60–92	6–7	Carrier Dome (18,669); Syracuse, NY
December 28, 2009*; 7:00pm		Alma	W 106–58	7–7	Athletics Center O'rena (2,055); Rochester, MI
December 31, 2009; 1:00pm		Western Illinois	W 75–63	8–7 (2–0)	Athletics Center O'rena (2,035); Rochester, MI
January 2, 2010; 5:30pm, Fox Sports Detroit		IUPUI	W 85–82	9–7 (3–0)	Athletics Center O'rena (2,855); Rochester, MI
January 7, 2010; 8:05pm, FCS Central		at Oral Roberts	W 67–64	10–7 (4–0)	Mabee Center (4,089); Tulsa, OK
January 9, 2010; 8:30pm		at Centenary	W 88–50	11–7 (5–0)	Gold Dome (405); Shreveport, LA
January 14, 2010; 7:00pm		UMKC	W 87–73	12–7 (6–0)	Athletics Center O'rena (2,755); Rochester, MI
January 16, 2010; 6:00pm		Southern Utah	W 99–53	13–7 (7–0)	Athletics Center O'rena (3,125); Rochester, MI
January 21, 2010; 8:00pm		at North Dakota State	W 85–79	14–7 (8–0)	Bison Sports Arena (3,126); Fargo, ND
January 23, 2010; 8:30pm		at South Dakota State	W 85–82	15–7 (9–0)	Frost Arena (4,064); Brookings, SD
January 28, 2010; 7:00pm		at IUPUI	L 54–78	15–8 (9–1)	IUPUI Gymnasium (1,188); Indianapolis, IN
January 30, 2010; 8:00pm		at Western Illinois	W 68–64	16–8 (10–1)	Waste Management Court (997); Macomb, IL
February 4, 2010; 7:00pm		Centenary	W 75–64	17–8 (11–1)	Athletics Center O'rena (2,115); Rochester, MI
February 6, 2010; 6:00pm		Oral Roberts	W 79–77	18–8 (12–1)	Athletics Center O'rena (4,034); Rochester, MI
February 11, 2010; 9:00pm		at Southern Utah	W 85–72	19–8 (13–1)	Centrum Arena (1,418); Cedar City, UT
February 13, 2010; 8:00pm, Metro Sports		at UMKC	W 83–71	20–8 (14–1)	Municipal Auditorium (1,783); Kansas City, MO
February 18, 2010; 7:00pm		South Dakota State	W 88–83	21–8 (15–1)	Athletics Center O'rena (2,485); Rochester, MI
February 20, 2010; 6:00pm, Fox Sports Detroit		North Dakota State	W 88–81	22–8 (16–1)	Athletics Center O'rena (3,101); Rochester, MI
February 27, 2010; 6:00pm		IPFW	W 86–83	23–8 (17–1)	Athletics Center O'rena (3,823); Rochester, MI
2010 The Summit League men's basketball tournament
March 6, 2010; 7:00pm, ESPN Full Court		vs. UMKC; Quarterfinals	W 85–70	24–8	Sioux Falls Arena (2,854); Sioux Falls, SD
March 8, 2010; 7:00pm, Fox Sports Detroit		vs. IPFW; Semifinals	W 71–58	25–8	Sioux Falls Arena (2,033); Sioux Falls, SD
March 8, 2010; 9:00pm, ESPN2		vs. IUPUI; Finals	W 76–64	26–8	Sioux Falls Arena (3,122); Sioux Falls, SD
2010 NCAA Division I men's basketball tournament
March 19, 2010*; 2:45pm, CBS		vs. No. 18 Pittsburgh; First round	L 66–89	26–9	Bradley Center (17,847); Milwaukee, WI
*Non-conference game. ^{#}Rankings from AP Poll. (#) Tournament seedings in parentheses. All times are in Eastern Time.
