= Rick Scruggs =

American college basketball coach (born 1955)

Biographical details
- Born: November 22, 1955 (age 70)
- Education: Georgia

Coaching career (HC unless noted)
- 1984–1986: Francis Marion (assistant)
- 1986–1989: North Greenville
- 1989–1991: Belmont Abbey
- 1991–1994: Pikeville
- 1994–1995: Milligan
- 1995–2010: Gardner–Webb
- 2010–2011: Appalachian State (associate HC)
- 2012–2016: Mars Hill

Head coaching record
- Overall: 408–409

Rick Scruggs (born November 22, 1955) is an American college basketball coach. He served as the head men's basketball coach at North Greenville University (1986–1989), Belmont Abbey College (1991–1994), the University of Pikeville (1994–1995), Milligan College (1994–1995), Gardner–Webb University (1995–2010), and Mars Hill College (2012–2016), compiling a career decor of 408–409.

== Head coaching record ==
Record table
Season	Team	Overall	Conference	Standing	Postseason
North Greenville Crusaders (NJCAA) (1986–1989)
1986–87	North Greenville	20–10			
1987–88	North Greenville	24–6			
1988–89	North Greenville	30–4			
North Greenville:		74–20			
Belmont Abbey Crusaders (Carolinas Intercollegiate Athletic Conference) (1989–1991)
1989–90	Belmont Abbey	17–14			
1990–91	Belmont Abbey	15–16			
Belmont Abbey:		32–30			
Pikeville Bears (NAIA) (1991–1994)
1991–92	Pikeville	15–18			
1992–93	Pikeville	15–17			
1993–94	Pikeville	18–15			
Pikeville:		48–50			
Milligan Buffaloes (NAIA) (1994–1995)
1994–95	Milligan	24–12			NAIA Division II first round
Milligan:		24–12			
Gardner–Webb Runnin' Bulldogs (South Atlantic Conference) (1995–2000)
1995–96	Gardner–Webb	15–12	7–7		
1996–97	Gardner–Webb	17–10	7–7		
1997–98	Gardner–Webb	13–14	3–11		
1998–99	Gardner–Webb	11–16	3–11		
1999–00	Gardner–Webb	25–5	13–3	T–1st	NCAA Division II first round
Gardner–Webb Runnin' Bulldogs (NCAA Division I independent) (2000–2002)
2000–01	Gardner–Webb	0–10*			
2001–02	Gardner–Webb	23–9			
Gardner–Webb Runnin' Bulldogs (Atlantic Sun Conference) (2002–2008)
2002–03	Gardner–Webb	5–24	2–14	5th (North)	
2003–04	Gardner–Webb	9–20	6–14	T–8th	
2004–05	Gardner–Webb	18–12	13–7	1st	
2005–06	Gardner–Webb	17–12	13–7	4th	
2006–07	Gardner–Webb	9–21	7–11	T–7th	
2007–08	Gardner–Webb	16–16	9–7	T–5th	
Gardner–Webb Runnin' Bulldogs (Big South Conference) (2008–2010)
2008–09	Gardner–Webb	13–17	9–9	T–5th	
2009–10	Gardner–Webb	8–21	5–13	T–8th	
Gardner–Webb:		199–219	97–121		
Mars Hill Lions (South Atlantic Conference) (2012–2016)
2012–13	Mars Hill	4–22	1–17	10th	
2013–14	Mars Hill	7–20	5–17	10th	
2014–15	Mars Hill	11–17	6–16	T–10th	
2015–16	Mars Hill	9–19	5–17	T–9th	
Mars Hill:		31–78	15–67		
Total:		408–409			
National champion Postseason invitational champion Conference regular season champion Conference regular season and conference tournament champion Division regular season champion Division regular season and conference tournament champion Conference tournament champion

- 22 wins vacated in 2004
