= 2009–10 UMKC Kangaroos men's basketball team =

American college basketball season

2009–10 UMKC Kangaroos men's basketball
- Conference: The Summit League
- Record: 12–18 (6–12 Summit)
- Head coach: Matt Brown (3rd season)
- Assistant coaches: Martin Unger (3rd season); Wendell Moore (2nd season); Stephen Brough (1st season)
- Home arena: Municipal Auditorium, Swinney Recreation Center

2009–10 Summit League men's basketball standings
	Conf.				Overall
Team	W		L	PCT	W		L	PCT
Oakland †	17	–	1	.944	26	–	9	.743
IUPUI	15	–	3	.833	25	–	11	.694
Oral Roberts	13	–	5	.722	20	–	13	.606
South Dakota State	10	–	8	.556	14	–	16	.467
IPFW	9	–	9	.500	16	–	15	.516
North Dakota State	8	–	10	.444	11	–	18	.379
Western Illinois	6	–	12	.333	13	–	17	.433
UMKC	6	–	12	.333	12	–	18	.400
Centenary *	3	–	15	.167	8	–	21	.276
Southern Utah	3	–	15	.167	7	–	22	.241
† Conference tournament winner As of March 22, 2010; Rankings from AP Poll * Ineligible for conference tournament

The 2009–10 UMKC Kangaroos men's basketball team represented the University of Missouri–Kansas City during the 2009–10 NCAA Division I men's basketball season. The Kangaroos played a majority of their home games off-campus at Municipal Auditorium, with five on-campus at Swinney Recreation Center, in Kansas City, Missouri as a member of The Summit League.

== Previous season ==
The Kangaroos finished the 2008–09 season with a record of 5–24 overall, 1–15 in The Summit League to finish in tenth place.

== Roster ==
2009–10 UMKC Kangaroos men's basketball team
Players
Coaches

Pos.	#	Name	Height	Weight	Year	Previous school	Hometown
F	15	Jay Couisnard	6 ft 6 in (1.98 m)	195 lb (88 kg)	RS Jr	Evansville; Jack Yates Senior HS/ Westbury Christian	Houston, TX
F	25	Daniel Brady	6 ft 7 in (2.01 m)	225 lb (102 kg)	Jr	North Idaho; Lakeridge HS	Lake Oswego, OR
G	10	Reggie Chamberlain (redshirt)	6 ft 0 in (1.83 m)	170 lb (77 kg)	Jr	Wichita State/ Seward County CC; Raytown Senior HS	Kansas City, MO
F	5	Spencer Johnson	6 ft 6 in (1.98 m)	215 lb (98 kg)	Jr	Laurinburg Institute/ Champaign Central HS	Champaign, IL
G	14	Bakari Lewis	6 ft 1 in (1.85 m)	175 lb (79 kg)	Jr	Nicholls State; IMG/ Shaker Heights HS	Cleveland, OH
G	12	Dustin Dibble	6 ft 4 in (1.93 m)	195 lb (88 kg)	So	Petoskey HS	Petoskey, MI
G	1	Michael Gholston, Jr.	6 ft 0 in (1.83 m)	175 lb (79 kg)	So	State Fair CC; Raytown South HS	Raytown, MO
G	2	Patrick Inyard (redshirt)	6 ft 2 in (1.88 m)	185 lb (84 kg)	So	Highland Park HS	Topeka, KS
G	22	Trey McKinney-Jones	6 ft 4 in (1.93 m)	205 lb (93 kg)	So	South Milwaukee HS	Bay View, WI
F	4	LaTreze Mushatt	6 ft 5 in (1.96 m)	210 lb (95 kg)	So	Arthur Hill HS	Saginaw, MI
G	3	Alex Bazzell	6 ft 1 in (1.85 m)	175 lb (79 kg)	Fr	St. Charles West HS	St. Charles, MO
F/C	21	Fred Chatmon	6 ft 9 in (2.06 m)	210 lb (95 kg)	Fr	Garfield Heights HS	Cleveland, OH
F/C	44	Kirk Korver	6 ft 7 in (2.01 m)	215 lb (98 kg)	Fr	Pella HS	Pella, IA
F	34	Max Rockmann	6 ft 6 in (1.98 m)	210 lb (95 kg)	Fr	Coubertin HS	Berlin, Germany
G	30	Aaron Young (W)	6 ft 3 in (1.91 m)	180 lb (82 kg)	Fr	Lincoln College Preparatory	Kansas City, MO

Head coach

- Matt Brown (Shippensburg)

Assistant coach(es)

- Martin Unger (Western Carolina)
- Wendell Moore (Georgia Southern)
- Stephen Brough (Miami (Ohio))

Legend

- (C) Team captain
- (S) Suspended
- (I) Ineligible
- (W) Walk-on
- (5Y) Fifth-year Senior
- Injured
- Current redshirt

Roster
Last update: November 3, 2024

== Schedule and results ==
Date time, TV	Rank^{#}	Opponent^{#}	Result	Record	High points	High rebounds	High assists	Site (attendance) city, state
Exhibition Season
November 6, 2009*; 7:05 PM		Bethel (Kansas)	W 75–39		16 – Couisnard	14 – Johnson	6 – Lewis	Swinney Recreation Center; Kansas City, MO
Regular Season
November 14, 2009*; 7:05 PM		Truman State	W 80–33	1–0	17 – Couisnard	6 – Johnson	5 – Gholston, Jr., McKinney-Jones	Swinney Recreation Center (1,588); Kansas City, MO
November 17, 2009*; 7:05 PM		Lincoln (Missouri)	W 78–52	2–0	20 – Mushatt	9 – Mushatt	5 – Bazzell	Swinney Recreation Center (1,017); Kansas City, MO
November 21, 2009*; 1:00 PM		at North Dakota	W 70–63	3–0	21 – Couisnard	9 – Johnson	6 – Bazzell	Betty Engelstad Sioux Center (1,789); Grand Forks, ND
November 24, 2009*; 7:07 PM		at Nebraska	L 48–70	3–1	11 – Couisnard	8 – Mushatt	3 – Lewis, Bazzell	Bob Devaney Sports Center (9,415); Lincoln, NE
November 28, 2009*; 7:05 PM		Idaho State	L 65–68	3–2	16 – Couisnard	7 – Mushatt	5 – Couisnard, McKinney-Jones	Swinney Recreation Center (1,022); Kansas City, MO
December 3, 2009; 7:05 PM		at Oral Roberts	L 57–68	3–3 (0–1)	14 – Mushatt	4 – Mushatt, Korver	2 – Gholston, Jr. Mushatt, Bazzell, Korver	Mabee Center (3,259); Tulsa, OK
December 5, 2009; 7:30 PM		at Centenary	W 84–83	4–3 (1–1)	18 – Lewis	10 – Mushatt	4 – Mushatt	Gold Dome (687); Shreveport, LA
December 9, 2009*; 7:07 PM		Wichita State	L 52–73	4–4	13 – Couisnard	7 – Lewis	2 – Johnson, Mushatt	Municipal Auditorium (1,779); Kansas City, MO
December 12, 2009*; 7:30 PM		at Houston Baptist	W 102–87	5–4	24 – Couisnard	8 – Johnson	4 – Bazzell	Frank and Lucille; Sharp Gymnasium (873); Houston, TX
December 19, 2009*; 7:05 PM		Central Arkansas	W 78–67	6–4	21 – McKinney-Jones	5 – Mushatt	7 – Couisnard	Swinney Recreation Center (1,123); Kansas City, MO
December 22, 2009*; 7:00 PM		at Saint Louis	L 54–61	6–5	18 – McKinney-Jones	8 – Johnson, McKinney-Jones	6 – Couisnard	Chaifetz Arena (6,762); St. Louis, MO
December 28, 2009*; 7:00 PM		at SIU Edwardsville	W 63–54	7–5	14 – Couisnard, McKinney-Jones	8 – Couisnard	5 – McKinney-Jones	Sam M. Vadalabene Center (1,650); Edwardsville, IL
December 30, 2009*; 7:05 PM		at Missouri	L 57–91	7–6	12 – Mushatt	5 – Mushatt	5 – Mushatt	Mizzou Arena (7,638); Columbia, MO
January 2, 2010; 7:05 PM		Southern Utah	W 53–50	8–6 (2–1)	11 – Couisnard, Johnson, Mushatt	7 – McKinney-Jones	4 – Lewis	Municipal Auditorium (5,532); Kansas City, MO
January 7, 2010; 7:05 PM		South Dakota State	L 69–74	8–7 (2–2)	18 – McKinney-Jones	6 – McKinney-Jones	6 – Lewis	Municipal Auditorium (802); Kansas City, MO
January 14, 2010; 6:05 PM		at Oakland	L 73–87	8–8 (2–3)	17 – Johnson	10 – Johnson	5 – Lewis	Athletics Center O'rena (2,755); Auburn Hills, MI
January 16, 2010; 6:00 PM		at IPFW	L 69–78	8–9 (2–4)	12 – McKinney-Jones	9 – Mushatt	2 – Dibble, McKinney-Jones	Allen County; War Memorial Coliseum (1,866); Fort Wayne, IN
January 21, 2010; 7:05 PM		Western Illinois	W 61–57	9–9 (3–4)	14 – Couisnard, Mushatt	10 – Johnson	5 – Lewis, McKinney-Jones	Municipal Auditorium (1,104); Kansas City, MO
January 23, 2010; 7:05 PM		IUPUI	L 64–65	9–10 (3–5)	22 – Couisnard	8 – Couisnard	6 – Lewis	Municipal Auditorium (2,199); Kansas City, MO
January 26, 2010; 7:05 PM		North Dakota State	L 64–65	9–11 (3–6)	18 – McKinney-Jones	7 – Lewis, Mushatt	3 – Couisnard, Lewis, McKinney-Jones	Swinney Recreation Center (1,598); Kansas City, MO
January 30, 2010; 8:30 PM		at Southern Utah	L 56–69	9–12 (3–7)	18 – Couisnard	7 – McKinney-Jones	5 – Lewis	Centrum Arena (3,020); Cedar City, UT
February 4, 2010; 7:05 PM		at North Dakota State	W 58–56	10–12 (4–7)	18 – Couisnard	13 – Couisnard	3 – Lewis	Bison Sports Arena (2,547); Fargo, ND
February 6, 2010; 7:30 PM		at South Dakota State	L 57–78	10–13 (4–8)	20 – Couisnard	7 – Mushatt	3 – Lewis	Frost Arena (2,799); Brookings, SD
February 11, 2010; 7:05 PM		IPFW	W 65–56	11–13 (5–8)	20 – Couisnard	11 – Johnson	4 – Lewis	Municipal Auditorium (1,033); Kansas City, MO
February 13, 2010; 7:05 PM		Oakland	L 71–83	11–14 (5–9)	22 – McKinney-Jones	8 – Mushatt	3 – Couisnard, McKinney-Jones	Municipal Auditorium (1,783); Kansas City, MO
February 18, 2010; 6:00 PM		at IUPUI	L 65–103	11–15 (5–10)	19 – Mushatt	6 – Mushatt	4 – Bazzell	IUPUI Gymnasium (1,215); Indianapolis, IN
February 20, 2010; 7:00 PM		at Western Illinois	L 59–64	11–16 (5–11)	15 – Couisnard, Mushatt	7 – Mushatt	5 – Couisnard	Western Hall (1,778); Macomb, IL
February 25, 2010; 7:05 PM		Centenary	W 83–69	12–16 (6–11)	22 – Couisnard	10 – Mushatt	2 – Lewis, McKinney-Jones, Mushatt, Rockmann	Municipal Auditorium (1,015); Kansas City, MO
February 27, 2010; 7:05 PM		Oral Roberts	L 72–89	12–17 (6–12)	17 – McKinney-Jones	8 – Johnson	4 – McKinney-Jones	Municipal Auditorium (2,894); Kansas City, MO
League Tournament
March 6, 2010*; 6:00 PM	(8)	vs. (1) Oakland [Quarterfinal]	L 70–85	12–18	14 – Johnson	8 – Mushatt	2 – Couisnard, Lewis, Bazzell	Sioux Falls Arena (2,854); Sioux Falls, SD
*Non-conference game. ^{#}Rankings from AP Poll. (#) Tournament seedings in parentheses. All times are in Central Standard Time (CST).
