= 2010 Atlantic Sun men's basketball tournament =

- Tournament Logo
- Classification: Division I
- Season: 2009–10
- Teams: 8
- Site: University Center; Macon, Georgia
- Champions: East Tennessee State (2nd title)
- Winning coach: Murry Bartow (2nd title)

2009–10 Atlantic Sun men's basketball standings
	Conf.				Overall
Team	W		L	PCT	W		L	PCT
Lipscomb	14	–	6	.700	17	–	13	.567
Jacksonville	14	–	6	.700	18	–	11	.621
Belmont	14	–	6	.700	19	–	11	.633
Campbell	14	–	6	.700	19	–	10	.655
East Tennessee State †	13	–	7	.650	17	–	14	.548
Mercer	10	–	10	.500	14	–	16	.467
North Florida	8	–	12	.400	13	–	17	.433
Kennesaw State	7	–	13	.350	13	–	19	.406
USC Upstate	6	–	14	.300	6	–	23	.207
Florida Gulf Coast	5	–	15	.250	8	–	21	.276
Stetson	5	–	15	.250	7	–	22	.241
† 2010 Atlantic Sun Tournament winner As of March 2, 2010; Rankings from AP Poll

The 2010 Atlantic Sun men's basketball tournament took place from March 3–6, 2010 at University Center in Macon, Georgia.

== Format ==
The top eight eligible men's basketball teams in the Atlantic Sun Conference received a berth in the conference tournament. After the 20 game conference season, teams are seeded by conference record. The East Tennessee State Buccaneers receive an automatic bid to the NCAA tournament. Since there was a four-way tie for the conference regular season title, the second seeded Jacksonville Dolphins, who advanced the furthest in the tournament, will receive an automatic bid to the NIT. Florida Gulf Coast and South Carolina-Upstate were not eligible to compete in this year's tournament due to NCAA reclassification.

== Bracket ==
Quarterfinals, March 3 & 4
1	Lipscomb	69
8	Kennesaw State	72
4	Campbell	64
5	ETSU	72
3	Belmont	81
6	Mercer	87
2	Jacksonville	76
7	North Florida	69

Semifinals, March 5
8	Kennesaw State	64
5	ETSU	69
6	Mercer	66
2	Jacksonville	63

Championship, March 6
5	ETSU	72
6	Mercer	66

Asterisk denotes game ended in overtime.
