= Adnan Hodžić =

Bosnian-American professional basketball player

Personal information
- Born: 6 December 1988 (age 37) Sarajevo, SR Bosnia and Herzegovina, SFR Yugoslavia
- Listed height: 6 ft 8 in (2.03 m)
- Listed weight: 245 lb (111 kg)

Career information
- High school: North Central (Indianapolis, Indiana)
- College: Lipscomb (2007–2011)
- NBA draft: 2011: undrafted
- Playing career: 2011–2015
- Position: Power forward

Career history
- 2011–2012: Walter Tigers Tübingen
- 2012–2013: BBC Monthey
- 2013–2014: Al Arabi
- 2014–2015: Aries Trikala

Career highlights
- Atlantic Sun Player of the Year (2010); AP honorable mention All-American (2010); 2× First-team All-Atlantic Sun (2009, 2010)

Adnan Hodžić (born 6 December 1988) is a Bosnian-American former professional basketball player. A 6'8" power forward and former student at Orchard Park Secondary School. Hodžić played college basketball for Lipscomb University in Nashville, Tennessee. Hodžić is notable both for winning the Atlantic Sun Conference Player of the Year and for leading the NCAA in field goal percentage as a junior in the 2009–10 NCAA Division I men's basketball season.

== High school career ==
Hodžić and his family emigrated from war-torn Sarajevo, Bosnia and Herzegovina in 1994 after Adnan needed treatment for an eye injury sustained while playing with a friend. Ultimately settling in Indianapolis, Indiana, Hodžić attended North Central High School with future NBA player Eric Gordon. Back injuries kept him from competing on the AAU circuit, keeping him off the radar of major conference programs. Hodžić chose to attend Lipscomb University and play for coach Scott Sanderson.

== College career ==
After making the Atlantic Sun all-freshman team in his first year at Lipscomb, Hodžić became one of the top post players in the conference as a sophomore. He averaged 16.5 points and 6.8 rebounds per game and made the all-conference first team. In his junior year, Hodžić really broke out, leading the Bisons to a share of the Atlantic Sun regular season championship. He averaged 22.7 points per game, finishing second in the nation in scoring. He also shot 60.4 percent from the floor to lead the country in field goal accuracy. Hodžić was named Atlantic Sun player of the year and an AP honorable mention All-American.

Following his junior season, Hodžić declared for the 2010 NBA draft but did not hire an agent. After participating in workouts, Hodžić withdrew his name from consideration and decided to return to Lipscomb for his senior season.

== Professional career ==
On 13 July 2011 Hodžić signed a one-year contract with Walter Tigers Tubingen of the German Basketball Bundesliga. In October 2013, he signed with Al Arabi of the Qatari Basketball League. In November 2014, he signed with Aries Trikala of the Greek Basket League.
