= 2009–10 Belmont Bruins men's basketball team =

American college basketball season

2009–10 Belmont Bruins men's basketball

Atlantic Sun regular season champions
- Conference: Atlantic Sun Conference
- Record: 19–12 (14–6 A Sun)
- Head coach: Rick Byrd
- Home arena: Curb Event Center

2009–10 Atlantic Sun men's basketball standings
	Conf.				Overall
Team	W		L	PCT	W		L	PCT
Lipscomb	14	–	6	.700	17	–	13	.567
Jacksonville	14	–	6	.700	18	–	11	.621
Belmont	14	–	6	.700	19	–	11	.633
Campbell	14	–	6	.700	19	–	10	.655
East Tennessee State †	13	–	7	.650	17	–	14	.548
Mercer	10	–	10	.500	14	–	16	.467
North Florida	8	–	12	.400	13	–	17	.433
Kennesaw State	7	–	13	.350	13	–	19	.406
USC Upstate	6	–	14	.300	6	–	23	.207
Florida Gulf Coast	5	–	15	.250	8	–	21	.276
Stetson	5	–	15	.250	7	–	22	.241
† 2010 Atlantic Sun Tournament winner As of March 2, 2010; Rankings from AP Poll

The 2009–10 Belmont Bruins men's basketball team represented Belmont University during the 2009–10 NCAA Division I men's basketball season. The Bruins, led by 24th year head coach Rick Byrd, played their home games at the Curb Event Center, and were members of the Atlantic Sun Conference. They finished the season 19–12, 14–6 in the A-Sun, and being A-Sun regular season co-champions. The Bruins lost in the quarterfinals of the Atlantic Sun tournament to Mercer.

== Roster ==
Number	Name	Position	Height	Weight	Year	Hometown
1	Drew Hanlen	Guard	5–11	180	Sophomore	St. Louis, Missouri
3	Kerron Johnson	Guard	6–1	175	Freshman	Huntsville, Alabama
4	Jonny Rice	Guard	6	165	Sophomore	Naperville, Illinois
12	Mike Dejworek	Center	6-11	235	Senior	
13	Jon House	Guard	6–6	215	Junior	Guelph, Ontario
21	Ian Clark	Guard	6–3	175	Freshman	Memphis, Tennessee
24	Adam Barnes	Guard	6–2	190	Freshman	Clarksville, Tennessee
30	Tevor Noack	Forward	6–7	240	Freshman	Keller, Texas
32	Jordan Campbell	Guard	6–5	210	Junior	Indianapolis, Indiana
32	Scott Saunders	Forward	6–10	250	Sophomore	New Orleans, Louisiana
34	Mick Hedgepeth	Forward	6–9	235	Sophomore	Crossville, Alabama
45	Brandon Baker	Forward	6–6	220	Sophomore	Milford, Ohio

== Schedule ==
Date time, TV	Rank^{#}	Opponent^{#}	Result	Record	Site (attendance) city, state
Regular season
11/13/09*		vs. Portland State; Athletes In Action Basketball Classic	W 74–67	1–0	Bank of America Arena (8,239); Seattle, WA
11/14/09*; 7:00 pm		at No. 14 Washington; Athletes In Action Basketball Classic	L 78–96	1–1	Bank of America Arena (8,410); Seattle, WA
11/15/09*		vs. Wright State; Athletes In Action Basketball Classic	L 73–82	1–2	Bank of America Arena (8,236); Seattle, WA
11/21/09*		Alabama State	W 78–42	2–2	Curb Event Center (1,595); Nashville, TN
11/28/09*		at Eastern Illinois	W 95–62	3–2	Lantz Arena (670); Charleston, IL
11/30/09*		Tennessee State	W 69–60	4–2	Curb Event Center (1,025); Nashville, TN
12/3/09		at Kennesaw State	W 75–70 ^{OT}	5–2 (1–0)	KSU Convocation Center (1,285); Kennesaw, GA
12/5/09		at Mercer	W 94–90 ^{OT}	6–2 (2–0)	University Center (2,314); Macon, GA
12/8/09*		at Middle Tennessee	W 83–71	7–2	Murphy Center (2,738); Murfreesboro, TN
12/16/09*; 7:00 pm		at Saint Louis	L 67–75	7–3	Chaifetz Arena (6,432); St. Louis, MO
12/19/09*		Eastern Illinois	L 60–63	7–4	Curb Event Center (740); Nashville, TN
12/29/09*; 8 pm, ESPNU		at No. 1 Kansas	L 51–81	7–5	Allen Fieldhouse (16,300); Lawrence, KS
1/2/10		Florida Gulf Coast	L 63–66	7–6 (2–1)	Curb Event Center (1,270); Nashville, TN
1/4/10		Stetson	W 85–71	8–6 (3–1)	Curb Event Center (703); Nashville, TN
1/7/11		USC Upstate	W 68–58	9–6 (4–1)	Curb Event Center (518); Nashville, TN
1/11/10		at Lipscomb; Battle of the Boulevard	L 53–64	9–7 (4–2)	Allen Arena (5,414); Nashville, TN
1/14/10		at North Florida	L 43–45	9–8 (4–3)	UNF Arena (1,234); Jacksonville, FL
1/16/10		at Jacksonville	L 66–82	9–9 (4–4)	Jacksonville Veterans Memorial Arena (2,280); Jacksonville, FL
1/21/10		Campbell	W 66–55	10–9 (5–4)	Curb Event Center (977); Nashville, TN
1/23/10		East Tennessee State	W 100–89	11–9 (6–4)	Curb Event Center (2,011); Nashville, TN
1/28/10		Lipscomb; Battle of the Boulevard	L 72–78	11–10 (6–5)	Curb Event Center (5,009); Nashville, TN
1/30/10		at Campbell	W 75–50	12–10 (7–5)	John W. Pope Jr. Convocation Center (1,599); Buies Creek, NC
2/1/10		at East Tennessee State	W 74–67	13–10 (8–5)	Memorial Center (4,137); Johnson City, TN
2/5/10		Jacksonville	W 73–70	14–10 (9–5)	Curb Event Center (1,461); Nashville, TN
2/7/10		North Florida	W 70–56	15–10 (10–5)	Curb Event Center (874); Nashville, TN
2/13/10		at USC Upstate	W 70–57	16–10 (11–5)	G. B. Hodge Center (883); Spartanburg, SC
2/18/10		at Stetson	W 79–70	17–10 (12–5)	Edmunds Center (1,679); DeLand, FL
2/20/10		Florida Gulf Coast	L 80–85	17–11 (12–6)	Alico Arena (1,024); Fort Myers, FL
2/25/10		Mercer	W 77–73	18–11 (13–6)	Curb Event Center (1,110); Nashville, TN
2/27/10		Kennesaw State	W 74–42	19–11 (14–6)	Curb Event Center (2,029); Nashville, TN
Atlantic Sun tournament
3/2/11; 1:30 pm		at Mercer; Quarterfinals	L 81–87	19–12	Hawkins Arena (2,287); Macon, GA
*Non-conference game. ^{#}Rankings from AP Poll. (#) Tournament seedings in parentheses. All times are in Central Time.
