= 2009–10 IUPUI Jaguars men's basketball team =

American college basketball season

2009–10 IUPUI Jaguars men's basketball
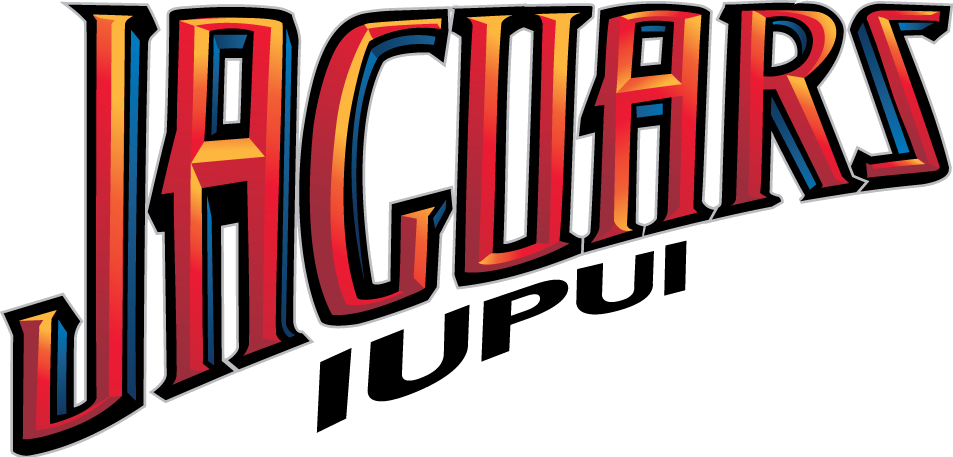

CBI, Quarterfinals
- Conference: The Summit League
- Record: 25–11 (15–3 Summit)
- Head coach: Ron Hunter
- Assistant coaches: Todd Howard; Matt Crenshaw; Austin Parkinson
- Home arena: IUPUI Gymnasium

2009–10 Summit League men's basketball standings
| | Conf. | | | | Overall |
| Team | W | | L | PCT | W | | L | PCT |
|---|---|---|---|---|---|---|---|---|
| Oakland † | 17 | – | 1 | .944 | 26 | – | 9 | .743 |
| IUPUI | 15 | – | 3 | .833 | 25 | – | 11 | .694 |
| Oral Roberts | 13 | – | 5 | .722 | 20 | – | 13 | .606 |
| South Dakota State | 10 | – | 8 | .556 | 14 | – | 16 | .467 |
| IPFW | 9 | – | 9 | .500 | 16 | – | 15 | .516 |
| North Dakota State | 8 | – | 10 | .444 | 11 | – | 18 | .379 |
| Western Illinois | 6 | – | 12 | .333 | 13 | – | 17 | .433 |
| UMKC | 6 | – | 12 | .333 | 12 | – | 18 | .400 |
| Centenary * | 3 | – | 15 | .167 | 8 | – | 21 | .276 |
| Southern Utah | 3 | – | 15 | .167 | 7 | – | 22 | .241 |
† Conference tournament winner As of March 22, 2010; Rankings from AP Poll * Ineligible for conference tournament

The 2009–10 IUPUI Jaguars men's basketball team represented the Indiana University – Purdue University Indianapolis in the 2009–2010 NCAA Division I basketball season. The Jaguars were coached by Ron Hunter and played their home games at IUPUI Gymnasium, also known as The Jungle in Indianapolis, IN and played three home games plus one exhibition game at Conseco Fieldhouse. The Jaguars are members of The Summit League. They finished the season 25–11, 15–3 in Summit League play and advanced to the championship game of the 2010 The Summit League men's basketball tournament before losing to Oakland. They were invited to the 2010 College Basketball Invitational, only the second time the school has ever participated in a post season tournament, where they advanced to the quarterfinals before losing to Princeton.

== Roster ==
| # | Name | Height | Weight (lbs.) | Position | Class | Hometown | Previous Team(s) |
|---|---|---|---|---|---|---|---|
| 1 | Leroy Nobles | 6'5" | 195 | G/F | Jr. | Louisville, KY, U.S. | Harmony Prep |
| 2 | Stephen Thomas | 6'1" | 170 | G | Jr. | Indianapolis, IN, U.S. | Cathedral HS; Dayton |
| 5 | Alex Young | 6'6" | 200 | F | So. | Indianapolis, IN, U.S. | Northwest HS |
| 12 | Greg Rice | 5'11" | 175 | G | Fr. | Indianapolis, IN, U.S. | Ben Davis HS |
| 13 | David Mazanowski | 6'3" | 190 | G | Fr. | Indianapolis, IN, U.S. | Guerin HS |
| 15 | Sean Esposito | 6'3" | 180 | G | Fr. | Indianapolis, IN, U.S. | Cathedral HS |
| 20 | Jon Avery | 6'7" | 205 | F | Sr. | Mansfield, OH, U.S. | Harmony Prep |
| 22 | Zach Litteral | 6'1" | 175 | G | Fr. | New Palestine, IN, U.S. | New Palestine HS |
| 23 | Robert Glenn | 6'7" | 200 | F | Sr. | Indianapolis, IN, U.S. | Ben Davis HS; Wabash Valley JC |
| 24 | Nick Kitcoff | 6'7" | 190 | G/F | So. | Indianapolis, IN, U.S. | Pike HS; Ancilla JC |
| 32 | Anthony Williams | 6'8" | 240 | F | Jr. | Winter Haven, FL, U.S. | Lake Region HS; Iowa Western |
| 42 | John Ashworth | 6'3" | 195 | G | Jr. | Indianapolis, IN, U.S. | Franklin Central HS |
| 44 | Nick DeSchepper | 6'3" | 180 | G | Jr. | Fishers, IN, U.S. | Hamilton Southeastern HS |
| 54 | Billy Pettiford | 6'7" | 220 | F | Sr. | Marion, IN, U.S. | Marion HS |
| 55 | Christian Siakam | 6'7" | 230 | F | So. | Cincinnati, OH, U.S. | Harmony Community HS |

== 2009-10 Schedule and results ==
- All times are Central

| Date time, TV | Rank^{#} | Opponent^{#} | Result | Record | Site (attendance) city, state |
Exhibition
| 11/2/2009*; 8:30pm | | Anderson | W 95–60 | — | Conseco Fieldhouse (1,663); Indianapolis, IN |
| 11/7/2009*; 2:00pm | | Saint Joseph's (IN) | W 86–62 | — | The Jungle (935); Indianapolis, IN |
Regular Season
| 11/14/2009*; 1:05pm | | at Drake; Glenn Wilkes Classic | W 88–82 | 1–0 | Knapp Center (3,344); Des Moines, IA |
| 11/18/2009*; 7:00pm | | at Eastern Illinois | W 69–66 | 2–0 | Lantz Arena (1,034); Charleston, IL |
| 11/20/2009*; 8:15pm | | vs. Austin Peay; Glenn Wilkes Classic | W 77–63 | 3–0 | Ocean Center (341); Daytona Beach, FL |
| 11/21/2009*; 6:00pm | | vs. Auburn; Glenn Wilkes Classic | L 65–80 | 3–1 | Ocean Center (360); Daytona Beach, FL |
| 11/22/2009*; 1:15pm | | vs. UT Martin; Glenn Wilkes Classic | W 67–56 ^{OT} | 4–1 | Ocean Center (213); Daytona Beach, FL |
| 11/25/2009*; 7:00pm | | IU East | W 98–67 | 5–1 | The Jungle (1,012); Indianapolis, IN |
| 11/28/2009*; 3:00pm, FS Kansas City | | vs. Kansas State; K-State Holiday Classic | L 57–70 | 5–2 | Sprint Center (7,053); Kansas City, MO |
| 12/3/2009; 7:00pm | | South Dakota State | W 79–57 | 6–2 (1–0) | The Jungle (1,025); Indianapolis, IN |
| 12/5/2009; 7:00pm | | North Dakota State | W 86–74 | 7–2 (2–0) | The Jungle (1,077); Indianapolis, IN |
| 12/9/2009*; 7:30pm | | Notre Dame | L 70–93 | 7–3 | Edmund P. Joyce Center (7,605); Notre Dame, IN |
| 12/12/2009*; 2:00pm | | IU South Bend | W 92–56 | 8–3 | The Jungle (820); Indianapolis, IN |
| 12/19/2010*; 7:00pm | | Duquesne | W 73–64 | 9–3 | The Jungle (1,088); Indianapolis, IN |
| 12/23/2009*; 12:00pm | | at Indiana State | L 59–72 | 9–4 | Hulman Center (4,013); Terre Haute, IN |
| 12/28/2009*; 12:00pm | | at Memphis | L 67–87 | 9–5 | FedEx Forum (17,020); Memphis, TN |
| 12/31/2009; 1:00pm | | at IPFW | W 79–69 | 10–5 (3–0) | Allen County War Memorial Coliseum (1,800); Fort Wayne, IN |
| 1/2/2010; 5:30pm, FS Detroit | | at Oakland | L 82–85 | 10–6 (3–1) | Athletics Center O'rena (2,855); Rochester, MI |
| 1/6/2010*; 7:00pm | | Ohio | L 62–63 | 10–7 | Conseco Fieldhouse (1,450); Indianapolis, IN |
| 1/9/2010; 7:00pm | | Western Illinois | W 67–54 | 11–7 (4–1) | The Jungle (1,088); Indianapolis, IN |
| 1/14/2010; 7:00pm | | Oral Roberts | W 90–87 ^{OT} | 12–7 (5–1) | Conseco Fieldhouse (2,130); Indianapolis, IN |
| 1/16/2010; 2:00pm | | Centenary | W 74–58 | 13–7 (6–1) | The Jungle (1,070); Indianapolis, IN |
| 1/21/2010; 9:00pm | | at Southern Utah | W 75–60 | 14–7 (7–1) | Centrum Arena (2,814); Cedar City, UT |
| 1/23/2010; 7:05pm | | at UMKC | W 65–64 | 15–7 (8–1) | Municipal Auditorium (2,199); Kansas City, MO |
| 1/28/2010; 7:00pm | | Oakland | W 78–54 | 16–7 (9–1) | The Jungle (1,188); Indianapolis, IN |
| 1/31/2010; 2:00pm | | IPFW | L 60–62 ^{OT} | 16–8 (9–2) | Conseco Fieldhouse (2,829); Indianapolis, IN |
| 2/6/2010; 7:00pm | | at Western Illinois | W 70–42 | 17–8 (10–2) | Western Hall (1,023); Macomb, IL |
| 2/11/2010; 7:00pm | | at Centenary | W 88–77 | 18–8 (11–2) | Gold Dome (630); Shreveport, LA |
| 2/13/2010; 7:05pm | | at Oral Roberts | L 60–61 | 18–9 (11–3) | Mabee Center (6,363); Tulsa, OK |
| 2/18/2010; 7:00pm | | UMKC | W 103–65 | 19–9 (12–3) | The Jungle (1,215); Indianapolis, IN |
| 2/20/2010; 7:00pm | | Southern Utah | W 77–61 | 20–9 (13–3) | The Jungle (1,215); Indianapolis, IN |
| 2/25/2010; 7:00pm | | at North Dakota State | W 66–52 | 21–9 (14–3) | Bison Sports Arena (2,395); Fargo, ND |
| 2/27/2010; 7:30pm | | at South Dakota State | W 86–76 | 22–9 (15–3) | Frost Arena (4,923); Brookings, SD |
Summit tournament
| 3/6/2010; 8:30pm | (2) | vs. (7) Western Illinois; Summit Quarterfinals | W 77–68 | 23–9 | Sioux Falls Arena (2,854); Sioux Falls, SD |
| 3/8/2010; 8:30pm | (2) | vs. (3) Oral Roberts; Summit Semifinals | W 69–65 | 24–9 | Sioux Falls Arena (2,033); Sioux Falls, SD |
| 3/9/2010; 8:00pm, ESPN2 | (2) | vs. (1) Oakland; Summit Championship | L 64–76 | 24–10 | Sioux Falls Arena (3,122); Sioux Falls, SD |
CBI
| 3/17/2010; 6:00pm | (M4) | at (M1) Hofstra; CBI First Round | W 74–60 | 25–10 | Hofstra Arena (952); Hempstead, NY |
| 3/22/2010; 6:00pm | (M4) | (M2) Princeton; CBI Quarterfinals | L 68–74 ^{2OT} | 25–11 | The Jungle (1,215); Indianapolis, IN |
*Non-conference game. ^{#}Rankings from AP Poll. (#) Tournament seedings in parentheses. M=CBI Midwest region.
