= Keith Benson =

American basketball player (born 1988)

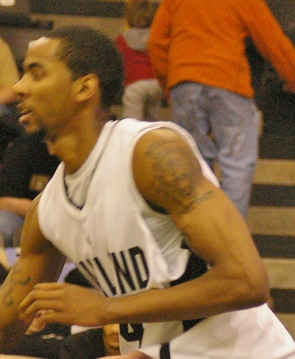
- Benson with Oakland in 2009

Personal information
- Born: August 13, 1988 (age 38) Cleveland, Ohio, U.S.
- Listed height: 6 ft 11 in (2.11 m)
- Listed weight: 247 lb (112 kg)

Career information
- High school: Detroit Country Day School (Beverly Hills, Michigan)
- College: Oakland (2007–2011)
- NBA draft: 2011: 2nd round, 48th overall pick
- Drafted by: Atlanta Hawks
- Playing career: 2011–2023
- Position: Center / power forward

Career history
- 2011: Dinamo Sassari
- 2012: Sioux Falls Skyforce
- 2012: Golden State Warriors
- 2012–2013: Erie BayHawks
- 2013: Talk 'N Text Tropang Texters
- 2013: Erie BayHawks
- 2013–2014: Tsmoki-Minsk
- 2014: Shaanxi Wolves
- 2014–2015: Neptūnas Klaipėda
- 2015: BC Kalev
- 2015–2017: Sioux Falls Skyforce
- 2017: Guizhou White Tigers
- 2017: Aris Thessaloniki
- 2018: Osaka Evessa
- 2018–2019: Eisbären Bremerhaven
- 2019–2020: South East Melbourne Phoenix
- 2020: Shabab Al Ahli
- 2020–2021: Rytas
- 2021: Levski Sofia
- 2021–2022: Kaohsiung Steelers
- 2022–2023: Juventus Utena
- 2023: Taichung Suns
- 2023: Zavkhan Brothers

Career highlights
- Bulgarian League champion (2021); NBA D-League champion (2016); All-NBA D-League First Team (2017); NBA D-League All-Defensive Team (2017); 2× NBA D-League All-Star (2016, 2017); Lou Henson Award (2010); 2× Summit League Player of the Year (2010, 2011); 2× First-team All-Summit League (2010, 2011); Summit League tournament MVP (2011)
- Stats at NBA.com
- Stats at Basketball Reference

Keith Anderson Benson Jr. (born August 13, 1988) is an American former professional basketball player. He played college basketball for Oakland University. A 6-foot-11 center, Benson was a second-round pick (48th overall) in the 2011 NBA draft, selected by the Atlanta Hawks. He has since played in Italy, Philippines, Belarus, China, Lithuania, Estonia and the NBA Development League.

== High school career ==
Born in Cleveland, Ohio and raised in Farmington Hills, Michigan, Benson attended Detroit Country Day School in Beverly Hills, Michigan. On the Detroit Country Day basketball team, Benson averaged only 6.9 points and 4.5 rebounds per game as a senior. Benson initially committed to Fairfield, but changed his mind after a coaching change and committed to Oakland after they offered him a scholarship.

== College career ==
After redshirting his first year at Oakland, Benson became a starter for the 2007–08 season. Benson started 20 of the team's 29 games and averaged 5.2 points and 3.5 rebounds. He finished the season with 40 blocks—one shy of Oakland's single-season record. However, he was benched prior to the conference tournament because OU's head coach, Greg Kampe, felt Benson was not playing good enough defense.

At the conclusion of his redshirt junior season, Benson received the Lou Henson Award, given to the "mid-major player of the year". Benson was also named the Summit League Player of the Year. Benson declared himself eligible for the 2010 NBA draft, but withdrew himself after he was unable to work out with NBA teams due to an injured right thumb.

Benson earned a Bachelor of Integrative Studies degree with a minor in art history from Oakland in August 2010, prior to his redshirt senior season. During his senior season in 2010–11, Benson enrolled in master's-level architecture courses in Oakland. In basketball, he set the Summit League's record for career blocks. He broke the record of 317, set by Keith Closs of Central Connecticut State University from 1994 to 1996. Benson was named the Summit League's Player of the Year for the second consecutive season in 2011.

== Professional career ==
=== 2011–12 season ===
After being projected as a late-second round pick, Benson was selected with the 48th overall pick in the 2011 NBA draft by the Atlanta Hawks, becoming the first player from Oakland University selected in the NBA draft. After playing in Italy for Dinamo Basket Sassari during the NBA lockout, he joined the Hawks for preseason in December 2011. After being waived by the Hawks, he joined the Sioux Falls Skyforce of the NBA Development League in January 2012. On March 24, he signed a 10-day contract with the Golden State Warriors. He appeared in three games for the Warriors.

=== 2012–13 season ===
After spending preseason with the Atlanta Hawks, Benson was acquired by the Erie BayHawks of the NBA D-League for the 2012–13 season. In January 2013, he moved to the Philippines to play for the Talk 'N Text Tropang Texters during the 2013 PBA Commissioner's Cup. He returned to the BayHawks in March 2013.

=== 2013–14 season ===
Benson spent the 2013–14 season in Belarus with Tsmoki-Minsk. In May 2014, he joined the Shaanxi Wolves in the Chinese NBL.

=== 2014–15 season ===
After initially signing with Turkish team Banvit, Benson spent the first half of the 2014–15 season in Lithuania with Neptūnas. In February 2015, he left Neptūnas and signed with Estonian team BC Kalev/Cramo.

=== 2015–16 season ===
After spending preseason with the Miami Heat, Benson joined the Sioux Falls Skyforce for the 2015–16 season. In February 2016, he played in the NBA D-League All-Star Game. He helped the Skyforce finish with a league-best 40–10 record in 2015–16, and went on to help the team win the NBA D-League championship with a 2–1 Finals series win over the Los Angeles D-Fenders.

=== 2016–17 season ===
After spending a second straight preseason with the Miami Heat, Benson once again played for the Sioux Falls Skyforce during the 2016–17 season.

=== 2017–18 season ===
In August and September 2017, Benson had a two-game stint with Guizhou White Tigersin the Chinese NBL. He then began the 2017–18 season in Greece with Aris Thessaloniki, before joining Japanese team Osaka Evessa in January 2018.

=== 2018–19 season ===
Benson's 2018–19 season was spent in Germany with Eisbären Bremerhaven.

=== 2019–20 season ===
On August 1, 2019, Benson signed with the South East Melbourne Phoenix in Australia for the 2019–20 NBL season. He parted ways with the Phoenix on January 4, 2020. Days later, he signed with Shabab Al Ahli of the UAE National Basketball League.

=== 2020–21 season ===
On December 17, 2020, he signed with Rytas of the LKL.

=== 2021–22 season ===
On May 25, 2022, Keith Benson was drafted thirteenth overall by Enemies with their second round pick of the 2022 BIG3 draft.

=== 2022–23 season ===
On March 8, 2023, Taichung Suns registered Benson as import player. On March 9, Benson signed with the Taichung Suns of the T1 League.

== Career statistics ==
Legend
GP	Games played	GS	Games started	MPG	Minutes per game
FG%	Field goal percentage	3P%	3-point field goal percentage	FT%	Free throw percentage
RPG	Rebounds per game	APG	Assists per game	SPG	Steals per game
BPG	Blocks per game	PPG	Points per game	**Bold**	Career high

=== College ===
Year	Team	GP	GS	MPG	FG%	3P%	FT%	RPG	APG	SPG	BPG	PPG
2007–08	Oakland	29	20	13.4	.505	.000	.667	3.5	.1	.2	1.4	5.2
2008–09	Oakland	**36**	**36**	27.8	**.622**	.000	.667	7.8	.7	.6	2.4	14.3
2009–10	Oakland	35	35	31.3	.533	**.400**	**.724**	**10.5**	.8	.4	3.3	17.3
2010–11	Oakland	35	35	**32.4**	.547	.391	.643	10.1	**1.1**	**.8**	**3.6**	**17.9**

=== NBA ===
==== Regular season ====
Year	Team	GP	GS	MPG	FG%	3P%	FT%	RPG	APG	SPG	BPG	PPG
2011–12	Golden State	3	0	3.0	.000	.000	.000	1.0	.0	.0	.0	.0
**Career**		3	0	3.0	.000	.000	.000	1.0	.0	.0	.0	.0

== Personal ==
Benson's mother Janice Ellen Hale is a professor of early childhood education at Wayne State University and founding director of the Institute for the Study of the African American Child at Wayne State.
