= Johnathon Jones =

American professional basketball player (born 1988)

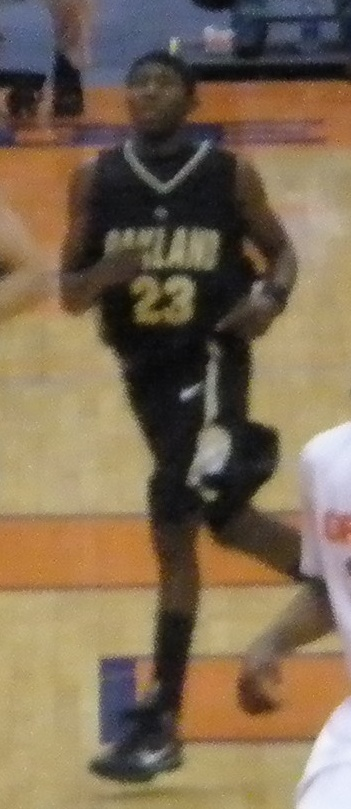

Free agent
- Position: Point guard

Personal information
- Born: May 1, 1988 (age 38) Okemos, Michigan, U.S.
- Listed weight: 160 lb (73 kg)

Career information
- High school: Okemos (Okemos, Michigan)
- College: Oakland (2006–2010)
- NBA draft: 2010: undrafted
- Playing career: 2011–present

Career history
- 2011–2012: MBK Rieker Komárno
- 2012: Fraport Skyliners
- 2012–2014: HKK Široki
- 2014–2015: KK Igokea

Career highlights
- NCAA assists leader (2009); First-team All-Summit League (2010)

Johnathon Christopher Jones (born May 1, 1988) is an American professional basketball player who last played for KK Igokea of the Bosnian League and Adriatic League. At the collegiate level, he played with Oakland. As a junior in 2008–09, he led the NCAA Division I in assists per game with an 8.06 average. Jones first played professionally with MBK Rieker Komárno of the Slovak Extraliga. He was not selected in the 2010 NBA draft.

== High school career ==
Jones attended Okemos High School in Okemos, Michigan. He gained state attention after completing his senior season, and achieved star status with the basketball team according to several reports from the Lansing State Journal. However, he still managed to finish his third year at Okemos averaging 19.8 points, 6.0 assists, and 5.0 steals. Jones also played American football with the school team, lettering as quarterback.

In his early years with Okemos High School, Jones became a huge contributor to the team's exceptional ranking and record. However, the team was knocked out of the state tournament in 2004 by Holt High School despite their rivals barely holding onto a .500 record and a winning season. However, in the following season, Jones scored 39 total points in a triple-overtime win over Holt, which was regarded as one of the greatest games in the history of the rivalry. On February 25, 2006, Okemos won again, with Jones scoring nine points, his lowest total in the season. He later said, "I knew they would (come through) ... It was a tie game, and they wanted the shots. I gave them the ball and that's what happens. It was hard. (But) I know the other players were open and I gave it to them." The win initiated a triumph in the Capital Area Activities Conference. Jones logged 38 points in his state championship game appearance. He finished his senior year averaging 21.6 points and 6.0 assists.

Following his final season at Okemos, Jones garnered several prestigious honors. He lettered in all four years under head coach Dan Stolz, and was named a Who's Who Among American High School Student, a list of younger athletes who have excelled in academics, extracurricular activities and community service. In his last year, Jones was also nominated to participate in the 2006 McDonald's All-American Boys Game, a roster dominated by the likes of Kevin Durant. He finished fourth in the voting for Mr. Basketball of Michigan and was named CAAC Conference Player of the Year on multiple occasions. He was also tabbed to the All-State first team.

Jones stood 5'11" and weighed 160 pounds at the time of his recruitment. He made the decision to stay close to home by committing to Oakland on April 12, 2006. Some of his other choices were Akron, Toledo, Bowling Green, and Dayton. Jones was not given any rating by Rivals.com.
