= Appalachian State Mountaineers men's basketball statistical leaders =

The Appalachian State Mountaineers men's basketball statistical leaders are individual statistical leaders of the Appalachian State Mountaineers men's basketball program in various categories, including points, rebounds, assists, steals, and blocks. Within those areas, the lists identify single-game, single-season, and career leaders. The Mountaineers represent Appalachian State University in the NCAA's Sun Belt Conference.

Appalachian State began competing in intercollegiate basketball in 1919. However, the school's record book does not generally list records from before the 1950s, as records from before this period are often incomplete and inconsistent. Since scoring was much lower in this era, and teams played much fewer games during a typical season, it is likely that few or no players from this era would appear on these lists anyway.

The NCAA did not officially record assists as a stat until the 1983–84 season, and blocks and steals until the 1985–86 season, but Appalachian State's record books includes players in these stats before these seasons. These lists are updated through the end of the 2019–20 season.

== Scoring ==
Career
Rk	Player	Points	Seasons
1	Donald Sims	2,185	2007–08 2008–09 2009–10 2010–11
2	Justin Forrest	2,120	2017–18 2018–19 2019–20 2020–21 2021–22
3	Ronshad Shabazz	2,067	2015–16 2016–17 2017–18 2018–19
4	Don King	1,794	1957–58 1958–59 1959–60 1960–61
5	Dave Abernathy	1,744	1953–54 1954–55 1955–56 1956–57
6	Wayne Duncan	1,734	1961–62 1962–63 1963–64 1964–65
7	Billy Ross	1,656	1989–90 1990–91 1991–92 1992–93
8	Darryl Robinson	1,631	1975–76 1976–77 1977–78 1978–79
9	D.J. Thompson	1,599	2003–04 2004–05 2005–06 2006–07
10	Rick Howe	1,593	1957–58 1958–59 1959–60 1960–61

Season
Rk	Player	Points	Season
1	Donald Sims	754	2009–10
2	Billy Ross	683	1992–93
3	Donald Sims	652	2010–11
4	John Pyecha	630	1954–55
5	Ronshad Shabazz	609	2017–18
6	Adrian Delph	602	2021–22
7	Allan Price	591	1968–69
8	Ronshad Shabazz	586	2018–19
9	Stan Davis	585	1972–73
10	Shawn Hall	573	2002–03

Single game
Rk	Player	Points	Season	Opponent
1	Stan Davis	56	1973–74	Carson-Newman
2	John Pyecha	50	1954–55	Western Carolina
3	John Pyecha	49	1954–55	Barton
4	Ronshad Shabazz	47	2018–19	ULM
5	Donald Sims	44	2009–10	Davidson
6	Junior Braswell	43	1996–97	Davidson
7	John Pyecha	42	1954–55	High Point
8	Stan Davis	41	1972–73	Georgia Southern
	Billy Ross	41	1992–93	Marshall
10	Wayne Duncan	40	1964–65	Barton
	Donald Sims	40	2010–11	Mississippi State

== Rebounds ==
Career
Rk	Player	Rebounds	Seasons
1	Wayne Duncan	1,108	1961–62 1962–63 1963–64 1964–65
2	Rick Howe	1,097	1957–58 1958–59 1959–60 1960–61
3	Isaac Johnson	977	2016–17 2017–18 2018–19 2019–20
4	Charles Payton	974	1978–79 1979–80 1980–81 1981–82
5	Mel Hubbard	926	1975–76 1976–77 1977–78 1978–79
6	Bob Campbell	860	1952–53 1953–54 1954–55 1955–56
7	Allan Price	855	1966–67 1967–68 1968–69
8	Chad McClendon	840	1991–92 1992–93 1993–94 1994–95
9	Isaac Butts	805	2007–08 2008–09 2009–10 2011–12
10	Dave Abernathy	783	1953–54 1954–55 1955–56 1956–57

Season
Rk	Player	Rebounds	Season
1	Tony Searcy	359	1977–78
2	John Pyecha	352	1951–52
3	Allan Price	351	1968–69
4	Rick Howe	350	1959–60
	Rick Howe	350	1960–61
6	Joe Hunt	327	1951–52
7	John Pyecha	318	1954–55
8	Charles Payton	310	1980–81
9	Isaac Butts	301	2009–10
	TreVon Spillers	301	2023–24

Single game
Rk	Player	Rebounds	Season	Opponent
1	Larry Dudas	24	1971–72	UNC Wilmington
	Tony Searcy	24	1977–78	High Point
3	Wayne Duncan	23	1963–64	Barton
	Tony Searcy	23	1977–78	The Citadel
5	John Pyecha	22	1951–52	Catawba
6	Tony Searcy	21	1977–78	ETSU
7	John Pyecha	20	1954–55	Milligan
8	Joe Hunt	19	1951–52	High Point
	Joe Hunt	19	1951–52	Lenoir-Rhyne
	John Pyecha	19	1951–52	Erskine
	Joe Hunt	19	1951–52	Erskine
	John Pyecha	19	1951–52	Catawba
	Dave Abernathy	19	1953–54	Guilford
	John Pyecha	19	1954–55	East Carolina
	Chad McClendon	19	1992–93	Western Carolina
	Chad McClendon	19	1994–95	VMI
	Isaac Butts	19	2008–09	Georgia Southern

== Assists ==
Career
Rk	Player	Assists	Seasons
1	Tyson Patterson	638	1996–97 1997–98 1998–99 1999–00
2	D.J. Thompson	508	2003–04 2004–05 2005–06 2006–07
3	Kemp Phillips	442	1986–87 1987–88 1988–89 1989–90
4	Junior Braswell	420	1993–94 1994–95 1995–96 1996–97
5	Donovan Gregory	409	2019–20 2020–21 2021–22 2022–23 2023–24
6	Rodney Peel	373	1987–88 1988–89 1989–90 1990–91 1991–92
7	Justin Forrest	372	2017–18 2018–19 2019–20 2020–21 2021–22
8	Donald Sims	346	2007–08 2008–09 2009–10 2010–11
9	Ricky Nedd	311	1990–91 1991–92 1992–93 1993–94
10	Walter Anderson	307	1976–77 1977–78 1978–79 1979–80

Season
Rk	Player	Assists	Season
1	Tyson Patterson	218	1999–00
2	D.J. Thompson	163	2006–07
3	Myles Tate	162	2024–25
4	Tyson Patterson	159	1997–98
5	Tyson Patterson	154	1998–99
6	Kemp Phillips	153	1989–90
7	Jonathan Butler	147	2000–01
8	Graham Bunn	140	2002–03
9	Junior Braswell	138	1995–96
10	D.J. Thompson	135	2004–05

Single game
Rk	Player	Assists	Season	Opponent
1	Tyson Patterson	14	1999–00	Lees-McRae
2	Junior Braswell	13	1995–96	VMI
	Graham Bunn	13	2002–03	ETSU
4	Tyson Patterson	12	1999–00	Chattanooga
	Tyson Patterson	12	1999–00	Georgia Southern
	Tyson Patterson	12	1999–00	Pfeiffer
	Ed Ward	12	1990–91	East Carolina
	Kevin Brown	12	1977–78	Wofford
9	Tyson Patterson	11	1999–00	VMI
	Tyson Patterson	11	1998–99	Winthrop
	Tyson Patterson	11	1997–98	VMI
	Jeff Williams	11	1992–93	Western Carolina
	Stan Davis	11	1972–73	Furman
	D.J. Thompson	11	2006–07	College of Charleston
	Demetrius Scott	11	2006–07	The Citadel
	Myles Tate	11	2006–07	Southern Miss

== Steals ==
Career
Rk	Player	Steals	Seasons
1	D.J. Thompson	293	2003–04 2004–05 2005–06 2006–07
2	Tyson Patterson	247	1996–97 1997–98 1998–99 1999–00
3	Rodney Peel	237	1987–88 1988–89 1989–90 1990–91 1991–92
4	Donovan Gregory	194	2019–20 2020–21 2021–22 2022–23 2023–24
5	Justin Forrest	191	2017–18 2018–19 2019–20 2020–21 2021–22
6	Matt Jones	167	2000–01 2001–02 2002–03 2003–04
7	Kemp Phillips	155	1986–87 1987–88 1988–89 1989–90
8	Ricky Nedd	152	1990–91 1991–92 1992–93 1993–94
9	Junior Braswell	137	1993–94 1994–95 1995–96 1996–97
10	Isaac Johnson	135	2016–17 2017–18 2018–19 2019–20

Season
Rk	Player	Steals	Season
1	Tyson Patterson	87	1999–00
2	D.J. Thompson	85	2006–07
3	D.J. Thompson	81	2005–06
	D.J. Thompson	81	2004–05
5	Rodney Peel	75	1989–90
	Tyson Patterson	75	1998–99
7	Marshall Phillips	63	1998–99
8	Rodney Peel	62	1991–92
9	Matt Jones	60	2002–03
	Myles Tate	60	2024–25

Single game
Rk	Player	Steals	Season	Opponent
1	D.J. Thompson	9	2006–07	UNCG
2	Tyson Patterson	8	1999–00	Lees-McRae
	Justin Forrest	8	2019–20	Little Rock
	Donovan Gregory	8	2020–21	Coastal Carolina
5	Rodney Peel	7	1989–90	Wofford
	Tyson Patterson	7	1998–99	VMI
	Matt Jones	7	2002–03	Davidson
	Corwin Davis	7	2003–04	SMU
	D.J. Thompson	7	2004–05	Chattanooga
	D.J. Thompson	7	2004–05	ETSU
	Eduardo Bermudez	7	2008–09	Charlotte
	Nathan Healy	7	2012–13	Western Carolina

== Blocks ==
Career
Rk	Player	Blocks	Seasons
1	Jeremy Clayton	220	2004–05 2005–06 2006–07 2007–08
2	Ricky Nedd	193	1990–91 1991–92 1992–93 1993–94
3	Justin Abson	166	2022–23 2023–24
4	Kareem Livingston	165	1994–95 1995–96 1996–97 1997–98
5	Andre Williamson	160	2008–09 2009–10 2010–11 2011–12
6	Tyrell Johnson	121	2015–16 2016–17 2017–18 2018–19
7	Steve Spurlock	118	1989–90 1990–91 1991–92
8	Sam Gibson	105	1987–88 1988–89 1989–90
9	Isaac Butts	96	2007–08 2008–09 2009–10 2011–12
10	Chris McFarland	95	2001–02 2002–03 2003–04 2004–05

Season
Rk	Player	Blocks	Season
1	Justin Abson	96	2023–24
2	Jeremy Clayton	75	2007–08
3	Justin Abson	70	2022–23
4	Ricky Nedd	67	1992–93
5	Luke Wilson	59	2025–26
6	Steve Spurlock	56	1990–91
7	Jeremy Clayton	55	2006–07
8	Ricky Nedd	54	1990–91
	Jacob Lawson	54	2015–16
10	Ricky Nedd	53	1993–94

Single game
Rk	Player	Steals	Season	Opponent
1	Justin Abson	8	2023–24	James Madison
	Jeremy Clayton	8	2007–08	Chattanooga
	Ricky Nedd	8	1993–94	Tennessee Tech
4	Justin Abson	7	2023–24	Georgia State
	Justin Abson	7	2023–24	Georgia Southern
6	Steve Spurlock	6	1990–91	East Carolina
	Steve Spurlock	6	1990–91	S.W. Louisiana
	Ricky Nedd	6	1990–91	Chattanooga
	Ricky Nedd	6	1992–93	ETSU
	Ricky Nedd	6	1992–93	Wingate
	Josh Grover	6	1996–97	Milligan
	Kareem Livingston	6	1997–98	VMI
	Jeremy Clayton	6	2006–07	Georgia Southern
	Donte Minter	6	2006–07	Western Carolina
	Jake Wilson	6	2017–18	Montreat
	Justin Abson	6	2023–24	Oregon State
	Justin Abson	6	2023–24	Central Penn
	Justin Abson	6	2023–24	Toledo
