= Charles Payton =

Chuck or Charles Payton or Peyton may refer to:

- Charles Alfred Payton (1843–1926), British adventurer, fisherman, diplomat and writer
- Charles Payton (basketball) (born 1960), American former basketball player
- Charles Peyton (born 1962), porn actor
