= 2009–10 Winthrop Eagles men's basketball team =

American college basketball season

2009–10 Winthrop Eagles men's basketball
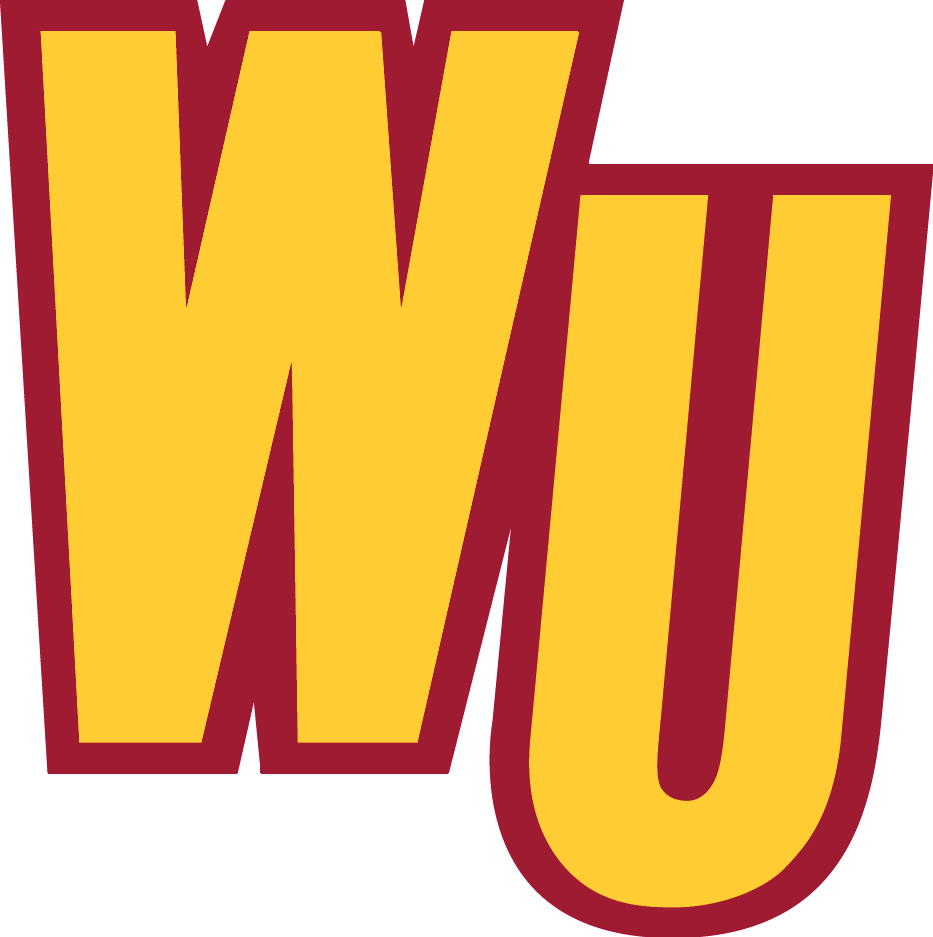

Big South Tournament Champions

NCAA tournament, Opening Round
- Conference: Big South
- Record: 19–14 (12–6 Big South)
- Head coach: Randy Peele
- Assistant coaches: Paul Molinari; Larry Dixon; Marty McGillan
- Home arena: Winthrop Coliseum

2009–10 Big South men's basketball standings
	Conf.				Overall
Team	W		L	PCT	W		L	PCT
Coastal Carolina	15	–	3	.833	28	–	7	.800
Radford	13	–	5	.722	19	–	12	.613
Winthrop †	12	–	6	.667	19	–	14	.576
UNC Asheville	11	–	7	.611	15	–	16	.484
High Point	10	–	8	.556	15	–	15	.500
Liberty	10	–	8	.556	15	–	16	.484
Charleston Southern	7	–	11	.389	13	–	17	.433
VMI	5	–	13	.278	10	–	19	.345
Gardner-Webb	5	–	13	.278	8	–	21	.276
Presbyterian	2	–	16	.111	5	–	26	.161
† 2010 Big South tournament winner As of March 16, 2010; Rankings from AP Poll

The 2009–10 Winthrop Eagles men's basketball team represented Winthrop University during the 2009–10 college basketball season. This was head coach Randy Peele's third season at Winthrop. The Eagles competed in the Big South Conference and played their home games at Winthrop Coliseum. They finished the season 19–14, 12–6 in Big South play to finish third in the conference. They won the 2010 Big South Conference men's basketball tournament to receive the conference's automatic bid to the 2010 NCAA Division I men's basketball tournament. They were selected to play in the Opening Round game where they lost to Arkansas-Pine Bluff.

== Roster ==
#	Name	Height	Weight (lbs.)	Position	Class	Hometown	Previous Team(s)
1	Raymond Davis	6'4"	205	G	Sr.	Atlanta, GA	Banneker HS; NW Shoals CC
2	Gideon Gamble	6'7"	186	G	Fr.	Atlanta, GA	Westlake HS
3	Justin Burton	5'10"	165	G	Jr.	Durham, NC	Riversid HS
4	Reggie Middleton	6'1"	190	G	So.	Augusta, GA	Glenn Hills HS
5	Matt Morgan	6'9"	235	C	So.	Landover, MD	Millersburg Military Institute; St. Bonaventure
10	Taylor Dunn	6'2"	195	G	Fr.	Ann Arbor, MI	Morgantown HS
11	Reggie King	6'2"	205	G	Fr.	Novelty, OH	Christ School
15	Andy Buechert	6'10"	235	C	Sr.	Trier, Germany	Tallahassee CC
21	Andre Jones	6'2"	190	G	So.	Suffolk, VA	Nansemond River HS
22	Robbie Dreher	6'4"	185	G	Fr.	Greenville, SC	Southside HS
23	Chad DeWitt	6'2"	200	G	Sr.	Darlington, SC	Spartenburg Methodist
25	Julius Francis	6'11"	243	C	Fr.	Warri, Delta State, Nigeria	Our Lady of Good Counsel HS
30	Chris Malcolm	6'7"	215	F	So.	Orlando, FL	Timber Creek HS
33	Mantoris Robinson	6'5"	205	F	Sr.	Charlotte, NC	Butler HS
42	Charles Corbin	6'7"	220	F	Jr.	Griffin, GA	Griffin HS
43	George Valentine	6'8"	235	F	Jr.	Fayetteville, NC	71st HS

== Schedule and results ==
Date time, TV	Rank^{#}	Opponent^{#}	Result	Record	Site (attendance) city, state
Regular Season
11/14/2009*; 4:00pm		Limestone	W 57–55	1–0	Winthrop Coliseum (3,178); Rock Hill, SC
11/17/2009*; 7:00pm		at College of Charleston	L 57–69	1–1	Carolina First Arena (3,421); Charleston, SC
11/21/2009*; 4:00pm		USC Upstate	W 49–46	2–1	Winthrop Coliseum (1,986); Rock Hill, SC
11/23/2009*; 7:30pm		at No. 19 Clemson	L 66–102	2–2	Littlejohn Coliseum (10,000); Clemson, SC
11/30/2009*; 7:00pm		at Appalachian State	L 51–70	2–3	George M. Holmes Convocation Center (1,292); Boone, NC
12/3/2009; 7:30pm		Radford	L 59–61	2–4 (0–1)	Winthrop Coliseum (2,042); Rock Hill, SC
12/5/2009; 7:00pm		High Point	W 82–68	3–4 (1–1)	Winthrop Coliseum (2,028); Rock Hill, SC
12/12/2009*; 8:00pm		Barton	W 64–51	4–4	Winthrop Coliseum (2,308); Rock Hill, SC
12/16/2009*; 7:00pm		at USC Upstate	W 62–53	5–4	G. B. Hodge Center (1,054); Spartanburg, SC
12/20/2009*; 4:00pm		Charlotte	L 47–57	5–5	Winthrop Coliseum (3,084); Rock Hill, SC
12/22/2009*; 7:30pm, FS Ohio		at Cincinnati	L 57–74	5–6	Fifth Third Arena (7,292); Cincinnati, OH
12/29/2009*; 7:00pm		at NC State	L 52–68	5–7	RBC Center (13,233); Raleigh, NC
1/2/2010; 2:00pm		at Coastal Carolina	L 47–57	5–8 (1–2)	Kimbel Arena (1,029); Conway, SC
1/4/2010; 7:30pm		at Charleston Southern	L 54–57	5–9 (1–3)	CSU Field House (547); Charleston, SC
1/7/2010; 7:00pm		VMI	W 96–63	6–9 (2–3)	Winthrop Coliseum (1,923); Rock Hill, SC
1/9/2010; 4:00pm		Liberty	W 65–62	7–9 (3–3)	Winthrop Coliseum (2,204); Rock Hill, SC
1/16/2010; 7:00pm		at Presbyterian	W 56–42	8–9 (4–3)	Templeton Physical Education Center (1,133); Clinton, SC
1/21/2010; 7:00pm		at UNC Asheville	L 53–66	8–10 (4–4)	Justice Center (1,076); Asheville, NC
1/23/2010; 7:00pm		Gardner–Webb	W 65–45	9–10 (5–4)	Paul Porter Arena (2,105); Boiling Springs, NC
1/28/2010; 7:00pm		Charleston Southern	W 55–53	10–10 (6–4)	Winthrop Coliseum (2,103); Rock Hill, SC
1/30/2010; 7:30pm		Coastal Carolina	W 67–64	11–10 (7–4)	Winthrop Coliseum (2,407); Rock Hill, SC
2/4/2010; 8:00pm		at Liberty	W 67–43	12–10 (8–4)	Vines Center (2,277); Lynchburg, VA
2/6/2010; 1:00pm		at VMI	W 87–83	13–10 (9–4)	Cameron Hall (1,653); Lexington, VA
2/13/2010; 3:30pm		Presbyterian	W 66–53	14–10 (10–4)	Winthrop Coliseum (2,640); Rock Hill, SC
2/16/2010; 7:00pm		Gardner-Webb	W 69–64	15–10 (11–4)	Winthrop Coliseum (1,737); Rock Hill, SC
2/20/2010*; 7:00pm		at Eastern Kentucky; ESPN BracketBusters	L 57–77	15–11	McBrayer Arena (1,150); Richmond, KY
2/23/2010; 7:00pm		UNC Asheville	W 68–65 ^{OT}	16–11 (12–4)	Winthrop Coliseum (2,263); Rock Hill, SC
2/25/2010; 7:00pm		at High Point	L 66–71	16–12 (12–5)	Millis Center (1,612); High Point, NC
2/27/2010; 4:00pm		at Radford	L 52–54	16–13 (12–6)	Dedmon Center (1,889); Radford, VA
Big South tournament
3/2/2010; 7:00pm	(3)	(6) Liberty; Big South Quarterfinals	W 80–72	17–13	Winthrop Coliseum (1,884); Rock Hill, SC
3/4/2010; 6:00pm, ESPNU	(3)	vs. (2) Radford; Big South Semifinals	W 61–46	18–13	Kimbel Arena; Conway, SC
3/6/2010; 4:00pm, ESPN2	(3)	at (1) Coastal Carolina; Big South Championship Game	W 64–53	19–13	Kimbel Arena (1,236); Conway, SC
NCAA tournament
3/16/2010; 7:30pm, ESPN	(16 S)	vs. (16 S) Arkansas-Pine Bluff; NCAA Opening Round	L 44–61	19–14	University of Dayton Arena (8,205); Dayton, OH
*Non-conference game. ^{#}Rankings from AP Poll. (#) Tournament seedings in parentheses. S=NCAA South Regional. All times are in Eastern Time. Source
