= 2010 Big South Conference men's basketball tournament =

- 2010 Big South Championship logo
- Classification: Division I
- Season: 2009–10
- Teams: 8
- Site: campus sites
- Finals site: Kimbel Arena; Conway, South Carolina
- Champions: Winthrop (10th title)
- Winning coach: Randy Peele (3rd title)

2009–10 Big South men's basketball standings
	Conf.				Overall
Team	W		L	PCT	W		L	PCT
Coastal Carolina	15	–	3	.833	28	–	7	.800
Radford	13	–	5	.722	19	–	12	.613
Winthrop †	12	–	6	.667	19	–	14	.576
UNC Asheville	11	–	7	.611	15	–	16	.484
High Point	10	–	8	.556	15	–	15	.500
Liberty	10	–	8	.556	15	–	16	.484
Charleston Southern	7	–	11	.389	13	–	17	.433
VMI	5	–	13	.278	10	–	19	.345
Gardner-Webb	5	–	13	.278	8	–	21	.276
Presbyterian	2	–	16	.111	5	–	26	.161
† 2010 Big South tournament winner As of March 16, 2010; Rankings from AP Poll

The 2010 Big South men's basketball tournament was played March 2, 4, and 6, 2010, on campus sites. The semifinal round was televised on ESPNU and the finals on ESPN2.

Winthrop defeated Coastal Carolina in the conference title game.

== Format ==
The top eight eligible men's basketball teams in the Big South Conference receive a berth in the conference tournament. After the 18 game conference season, teams are seeded by conference record. Since the Winthrop Eagles won the tournament, they received an automatic bid to the NCAA tournament. Also, the #1 seed Coastal Carolina Chanticleers received an automatic bid to the NIT.

== Bracket ==
Quarterfinals; March 2
1	Coastal Carolina	82
8	VMI	73
4	UNC Asheville	84
5	High Point	73
3	Winthrop	80
6	Liberty	72
2	Radford	64*
7	Charleston Southern	61

Semifinals; March 4
1	Coastal Carolina	92
4	UNC Asheville	73
3	Winthrop	61
2	Radford	46

Finals; March 6
1	Coastal Carolina	53
3	Winthrop	64

- asterisk indicates overtime game
