= 1979 Southern Conference men's basketball tournament =

- Classification: Division I
- Season: 1978–79
- Teams: 8
- Site: Roanoke Civic Center; Roanoke, VA
- Champions: Appalachian State (1st title)
- Winning coach: Bobby Cremins (1st title)

1978–79 Southern Conference men's basketball standings
	Conf.				Overall
Team	W		L	PCT	W		L	PCT
Appalachian State †	11	–	3	.786	23	–	6	.793
Furman	9	–	3	.750	20	–	9	.690
The Citadel	10	–	4	.714	20	–	7	.741
Western Carolina	5	–	7	.417	14	–	14	.500
Marshall	5	–	8	.385	11	–	16	.407
Davidson	3	–	7	.300	8	–	19	.296
Chattanooga	3	–	8	.273	14	–	13	.519
VMI	2	–	8	.200	12	–	15	.444
† 1979 Southern Conference Tournament winner Rankings from AP poll

The 1979 Southern Conference men's basketball tournament took place from February 24–March 4, 1979. The quarterfinal round was hosted at campus sites, while the semifinals and finals were hosted at the Roanoke Civic Center in Roanoke, Virginia. The Appalachian State Mountaineers, led by head coach Bobby Cremins, won their first Southern Conference title and received the automatic berth to the 1979 NCAA tournament.

== Format ==
All of the conference's eight members were eligible for the tournament. Teams were seeded based on conference winning percentage. The tournament used a preset bracket consisting of three rounds.

== Bracket ==
Quarterfinals; February 24
1	Appalachian State	73
8	VMI	63
4	Western Carolina	67
5	Marshall	50
2	Furman	86
7	Chattanooga	68
3	The Citadel	86
6	Davidson	79

Semifinals; March 3
1	Appalachian State	65
4	Western Carolina	43
2	Furman	105
3	The Citadel	94

Finals; March 4
1	Appalachian State	86
2	Furman	83

* Overtime game

== See also ==
- List of Southern Conference men's basketball champions
