= 2009–10 Western Carolina Catamounts men's basketball team =

American college basketball season

2009–10 Western Carolina Catamounts men's basketball
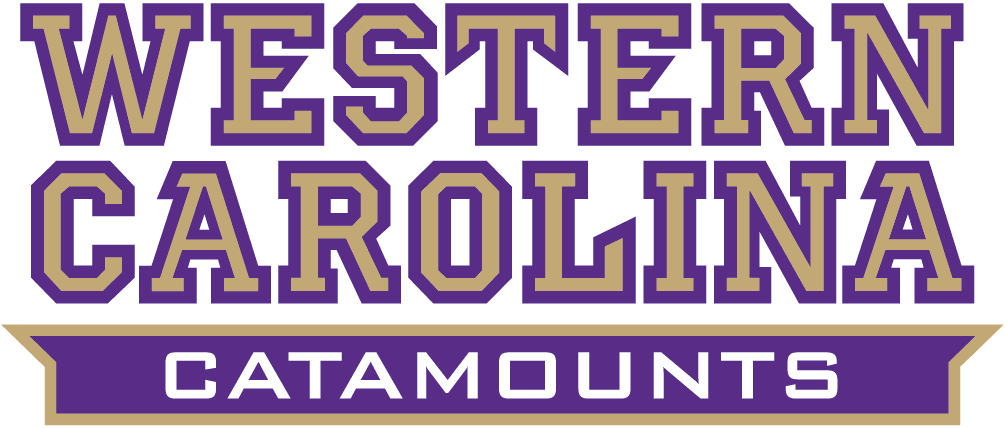

CIT, First Round
- Conference: Southern Conference
- Record: 22–12 (11–7 SoCon)
- Head coach: Larry Hunter
- Assistant coaches: Wade O'Connor; Andre Gray; Anquell McCollum
- Home arena: Ramsey Center

2009–10 Southern Conference men's basketball standings
	Conf.				Overall
Team	W		L	PCT	W		L	PCT
North
Appalachian State	13	–	5	.722	24	–	12	.667
Western Carolina	11	–	7	.611	22	–	12	.647
Chattanooga	6	–	12	.333	15	–	18	.455
UNC Greensboro	6	–	12	.333	8	–	23	.258
Samford	5	–	13	.278	11	–	20	.355
Elon	5	–	13	.278	9	–	23	.281
South
Wofford†	15	–	3	.833	26	–	9	.743
College of Charleston	14	–	4	.778	22	–	12	.647
Davidson	11	–	7	.611	16	–	15	.516
The Citadel	9	–	9	.500	16	–	16	.500
Furman	7	–	11	.389	13	–	17	.433
Georgia Southern	6	–	12	.333	9	–	23	.281
† SoCon Tournament winner As of March 22, 2010; Rankings from AP Poll

The 2009–10 Western Carolina Catamounts men's basketball team represented Western Carolina University during the 2009–10 college basketball season. This was head coach Larry Hunter's fifth season at Western Carolina. The Catamounts competed in the Southern Conference and played their home games at the Ramsey Center. They finished the season 22–12, 11–7 in SoCon play, lost in the semifinals of the 2010 Southern Conference men's basketball tournament and were invited to the 2010 CollegeInsider.com Tournament where they lost in the first round to Marshall.

== Roster ==
#	Name	Height	Weight (lbs.)	Position	Class	Hometown	Previous Team(s)
1	Brandon Giles	6'6"	200	G	Sr.	Auburndale, FL, U.S.	Auburndale HS
2	Kendall Russell	6'6"	205	F	Sr.	Chicago, IL, U.S.	Von Steuben HS; Cloud County CC
3	Antoine Childs	6'6"	205	G/F	So.	Beaver Falls, PA, U.S.	Blackhawk HS
4	Keaton Cole	5'10"	170	G	So.	Toronto, ON, Canada	Eastern Commerce
5	Trey Sumler	6'2"	175	G	Fr.	Rocky Mount, NC, U.S.	Nash Central HS
11	Anthony Phillip	6'4"	210	F	Jr.	Lauderdale Lakes, FL, U.S.	Boyd H. Anderson HS; Miami Dade CC
12	Mike Williams	6'2"	175	G	Jr.	Baton Rouge, LA, U.S.	Genesis One Prep; Jackson State CC
13	Brigham Waginger	6'2"	175	G	Sr.	South Webster, OH, U.S.	South Webster HS
22	Harouna Mutombo	6'4"	195	G	So.	Pickering, ON, Canada	Pickering HS
31	Adrian Gailliard	6'7"	225	F	Sr.	Sewell, NJ, U.S.	Washington Township HS; Lackawanna
34	Blake Gallagher	6'8"	240	F	Jr.	Monroe, NC, U.S.	Fork Union Military Academy
42	Jake Robinson	6'8"	205	F	Sr.	Canton, NC, U.S.	Pisgah HS
44	Sam Smithson	6'9"	225	C	Fr.	Horse Shoe, NC, U.S.	Hargrave Military Academy
50	Richie Gordon	6'9"	245	F	Jr.	Atlanta, GA, U.S.	Lakeside HS

== Schedule and results ==
- All times are Eastern

Date time, TV	Rank^{#}	Opponent^{#}	Result	Record	Site (attendance) city, state
Regular Season
11/14/2009*; 7:00pm		St. Catharine	W 65–41	1–0	Ramsey Center (1,925); Cullowhee, NC
11/18/2009*; 9:00pm, ESPNU		at No. 3 Texas; CBE Classic	L 73–41	1–1	Frank Erwin Center (11,317); Austin, TX
11/23/2009*; 7:30pm		Arkansas–Monticello; CBE Classic	W 70–44	2–1	Ramsey Center (1,073); Cullowhee, NC
11/24/2009*; 7:30pm		Binghamton; CBE Classic	W 73–44	3–1	Ramsey Center (909); Cullowhee, NC
11/25/2009*; 7:30pm		Duquesne; CBE Classic	W 83–77	4–1	Ramsey Center (787); Cullowhee, NC
11/28/2009*; 7:00pm		at Gardner–Webb	W 75–59	5–1	Paul Porter Arena (1,400); Boiling Springs, NC
12/2/2009; 7:30pm		Wofford	W 72–67	6–1 (1–0)	Ramsey Center (1,527); Cullowhee, NC
12/5/2009; 4:00pm		at Furman	W 64–57	7–1 (2–0)	Timmons Arena (1,320); Greenville, SC
12/7/2009*; 8:05pm		at Bradley	W 75–67	8–1	Carver Arena (9,019); Peoria, IL
12/10/2009*; 7:00pm		Campbell	W 66–59	9–1	Ramsey Center (2,794); Cullowhee, NC
12/12/2009*; 4:00pm		at Louisville	W 91–83	10–1	Freedom Hall (19,247); Louisville, KY
12/22/2009*; 7:30pm		at No. 24 Clemson	L 79–57	10–2	Littlejohn Coliseum (8,485); Clemson, SC
12/30/2009*; 2:00pm		UNC Asheville	W 87–76	11–2	Ramsey Center (2,763); Cullowhee, NC
1/5/2010*; 7:00pm		Berea	W 124–53	12–2	Ramsey Center (502); Cullowhee, NC
1/9/2010; 3:30pm		at Georgia Southern	L 81–76	12–3 (2–1)	Hanner Fieldhouse (1,779); Statesboro, GA
1/14/2010; 7:00pm		UNC Greensboro	W 79–69	13–3 (3–1)	Ramsey Center (3,027); Cullowhee, NC
1/16/2010; 7:00pm		Elon	W 83–81	14–3 (4–1)	Ramsey Center (3,086); Cullowhee, NC
1/20/2010; 7:00pm		at Davidson	W 77–67	15–3 (5–1)	John M. Belk Arena (4,624); Davidson, NC
1/23/2010; 3:30pm		at Appalachian State	L 62–52	15–4 (5–2)	George M. Holmes Convocation Center (5,074); Boone, NC
1/25/2010; 7:00pm, CSS		College of Charleston	W 100–90	16–4 (6–2)	Ramsey Center (4,765); Cullowhee, NC
1/28/2010; 7:00pm		at Chattanooga	L 80–67	16–5 (6–3)	McKenzie Arena (3,382); Chattanooga, TN
1/30/2010; 8:00pm		at Samford	W 62–50	17–5 (7–3)	Pete Hanna Center (1,515); Birmingham, AL
2/4/2010; 7:00pm		Georgia Southern	W 83–68	18–5 (8–3)	Ramsey Center (1,829); Cullowhee, NC
2/6/2010; 7:00pm		Appalachian State	L 89–77	18–6 (8–4)	Ramsey Center (6,024); Cullowhee, NC
2/8/2010; 7:00pm		at Elon	L 81–76	18–7 (8–5)	Alumni Gym (1,072); Elon, NC
2/13/2010; 7:00pm		Davidson	L 75–72	18–8 (8–6)	Ramsey Center (2,471); Cullowhee, NC
2/15/2010; 7:00pm		at UNC Greensboro	W 75–70	19–8 (9–6)	Fleming Gymnasium (3,194); Greensboro, NC
2/18/2010; 7:05pm		at The Citadel	L 73–56	19–9 (9–7)	McAlister Field House (1,680); Charleston, SC
2/20/2010*; 8:00pm, ESPNU		at Kent State; ESPN BracketBusters	L 74–72	19–10	MAC Center (5,003); Kent, OH
2/25/2010; 7:00pm		Samford	W 61–44	20–10 (10–7)	Ramsey Center (2,382); Cullowhee, NC
2/27/2010; 3:00pm, SportsSouth		Chattanooga	W 78–70	21–10 (11–7)	Ramsey Center (2,965); Cullowhee, NC
2010 Southern Conference men's basketball tournament
3/6/2010; 2:00pm		vs. Elon; Quarterfinals	W 68–57	22–10	Bojangles' Coliseum (NA); Charlotte, NC
3/7/2010; 6:00pm		vs. Wofford; Semifinals	L 77–58	22–11	Time Warner Cable Arena (NA); Charlotte, NC
2010 CollegeInsider.com Tournament
3/16/2010; 7:00pm		at Marshall; First Round	L 90–88	22–12	Cam Henderson Center (5,003); Huntington, WV
*Non-conference game. ^{#}Rankings from AP Poll. (#) Tournament seedings in parentheses.
