= 2009–10 The Citadel Bulldogs basketball team =

American college basketball season

2009–10 The Citadel Bulldogs men's basketball
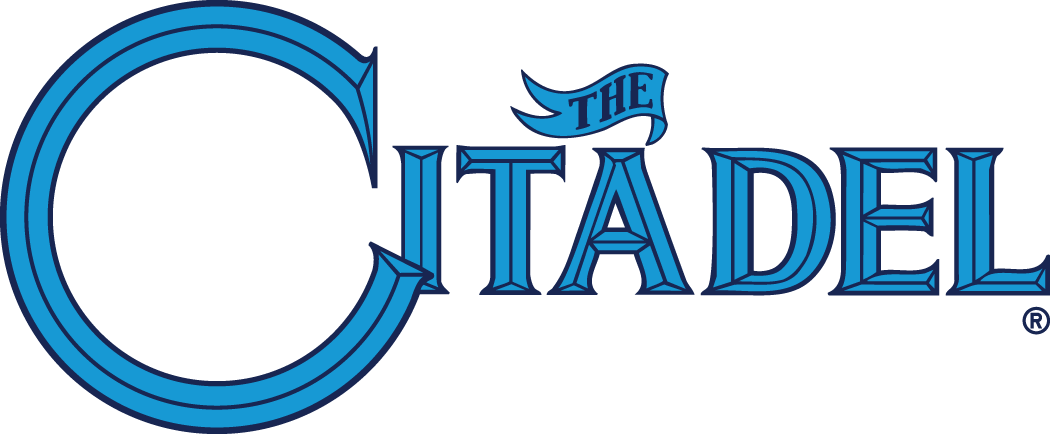
- Conference: Southern Conference
- Record: 16–16 (9–9 SoCon)
- Head coach: Ed Conroy
- Home arena: McAlister Field House

2009–10 Southern Conference men's basketball standings
	Conf.				Overall
Team	W		L	PCT	W		L	PCT
North
Appalachian State	13	–	5	.722	24	–	12	.667
Western Carolina	11	–	7	.611	22	–	12	.647
Chattanooga	6	–	12	.333	15	–	18	.455
UNC Greensboro	6	–	12	.333	8	–	23	.258
Samford	5	–	13	.278	11	–	20	.355
Elon	5	–	13	.278	9	–	23	.281
South
Wofford†	15	–	3	.833	26	–	9	.743
College of Charleston	14	–	4	.778	22	–	12	.647
Davidson	11	–	7	.611	16	–	15	.516
The Citadel	9	–	9	.500	16	–	16	.500
Furman	7	–	11	.389	13	–	17	.433
Georgia Southern	6	–	12	.333	9	–	23	.281
† SoCon Tournament winner As of March 22, 2010; Rankings from AP Poll

The 2009–10 The Citadel Bulldogs basketball team represented The Citadel, The Military College of South Carolina in the 2009-10 NCAA Division I men's basketball season. The Bulldogs were led by fourth year head coach Ed Conroy and played their home games at McAlister Field House. They played as members of the Southern Conference, as they have since 1936.

== Schedule ==
Date time, TV	Opponent	Result	Record	Site (attendance) city, state
November 13*	Kenyon	W 64–45	1–0	McAlister Field House (1,031); Charleston, SC
November 17*	Charleston Southern	L 60–61	1–1	McAlister Field House (1,268); Charleston, SC
November 20*	vs. Eastern Michigan; Hispanic College Fund Challenge	W 63–56	2–1	JQH Arena (n/a); Springfield, MO
November 21*	at Missouri State; Hispanic College Fund Challenge	L 55–72	2–2	JQH Arena (5,234); Springfield, MO
November 22*	vs. Maryland Eastern Shore; Hispanic College Fund Challenge	W 88–62	3–2	JQH Arena (N/A); Springfield, MO
November 24*	at No. 8 West Virginia	L 50–69	3–3	WVU Coliseum (12,348); Morgantown, WV
November 28*	UVA–Wise; Skip Prosser Classic	W 69–37	4–3	McAlister Field House (898); Charleston, SC
November 29*	Central Connecticut; Skip Prosser Classic	W 67–53	5–3	McAlister Field House (870); Charleston, SC
December 3	Davidson	L 63–74	5–4 (0–1)	McAlister Field House (1,487); Charleston, SC
December 5	Georgia Southern	W 68–43	6–4 (1–1)	McAlister Field House (1,337); Charleston, SC
December 7*	No. 12 Michigan State	L 56–69	6–5	McAlister Field House (5,194); Charleston, SC
December 19*	at Texas A&M	L 50–71	6–6	Reed Arena (7,165); College Station, TX
December 21*	at Houston	L 58–81	6–7	Hofheinz Pavilion (2,617); Houston, TX
January 2*	at Savannah State	W 54–47	7–7	Tiger Arena (350); Savannah, GA
January 6	at Appalachian State	W 62–58	8–7 (2–1)	George M. Holmes Convocation Center (1,037); Boone, NC
January 9	College of Charleston	L 55–61	8–8 (2–2)	McAlister Field House (5,370); Charleston, SC
January 14	at Chattanooga	L 54–56	8–9 (2–3)	McKenzie Arena (3,508); Chattanooga, TN
January 16	at Samford	W 51–50	9–9 (3–3)	Pete Hanna Center (1,071); Homewood, AL
January 21	Wofford	L 42–44	9–10 (3–4)	McAlister Field House (1,857); Charleston, SC
January 23	Furman	W 70–60	10–10 (4–4)	McAlister Field House (2,053); Charleston, SC
January 28	at Georgia Southern	L 58–61	10–11 (4–5)	Hanner Fieldhouse (1,894); Statesboro, GA
January 30	at Davidson	L 63–67 ^{OT}	10–12 (4–6)	John M. Belk Arena (2,673); Davidson, NC
February 4	Samford	W 61–57	11–12 (5–6)	McAlister Field House (1,440); Charleston, SC
February 6	Chattanooga	W 68–60	12–12 (6–6)	McAlister Field House (2,063); Charleston, SC
February 8	at College of Charleston	W 72–65	13–12 (7–6)	TD Arena (5,154); Charleston, SC
February 13	at Elon	W 77–22	14–12 (8–6)	Alumni Gym (1,427); Elon, NC
February 18	Western Carolina	W 73–56	15–12 (9–6)	McAlister Field House (1,680); Charleston, SC
February 20	UNC Greensboro	L 53–59	15–13 (9–7)	McAlister Field House (3,024); Charleston, SC
February 25	at Furman	L 44–59	15–14 (9–8)	Timmons Arena (2,073); Greenville, SC
February 27	at Wofford	L 66–75	15–15 (9–9)	Benjamin Johnson Arena (3,015); Spartanburg, SC
2010 Southern Conference men's basketball tournament
March 5	vs. Samford	W 55–43	16–15	Bojangles Coliseum (n/a); Charlotte, NC
March 6	vs. Appalachian State	L 61–71	16–16	Bojangles Coliseum (n/a); Charlotte, NC
*Non-conference game. ^{#}Rankings from AP Poll. (#) Tournament seedings in parentheses.
