= 2009–10 Coastal Carolina Chanticleers men's basketball team =

American college basketball season

2009–10 Coastal Carolina Chanticleers men's basketball

Big South Regular Season Champions

NIT, First Round
- Conference: Big South
- Record: 28–7 (15–3 Big South)
- Head coach: Cliff Ellis
- Assistant coaches: Don Hogan; Gus Hauser; Richie Riley
- Home arena: Kimbel Arena

2009–10 Big South men's basketball standings
	Conf.				Overall
Team	W		L	PCT	W		L	PCT
Coastal Carolina	15	–	3	.833	28	–	7	.800
Radford	13	–	5	.722	19	–	12	.613
Winthrop †	12	–	6	.667	19	–	14	.576
UNC Asheville	11	–	7	.611	15	–	16	.484
High Point	10	–	8	.556	15	–	15	.500
Liberty	10	–	8	.556	15	–	16	.484
Charleston Southern	7	–	11	.389	13	–	17	.433
VMI	5	–	13	.278	10	–	19	.345
Gardner-Webb	5	–	13	.278	8	–	21	.276
Presbyterian	2	–	16	.111	5	–	26	.161
† 2010 Big South tournament winner As of March 16, 2010; Rankings from AP Poll

The 2009–10 Coastal Carolina Chanticleers men's basketball team represented Coastal Carolina University during the 2009–10 college basketball season. This was head coach Cliff Ellis's third season at Coastal Carolina. The Chanticleers competed in the Big South Conference and played their home games at Kimbel Arena. They finished the season 28–7, 15–3 in Big South play to capture the regular season championship and lost in the championship game of the 2010 Big South Conference men's basketball tournament to Winthrop. As regular season champions they received an automatic bid to the 2010 National Invitation Tournament where they lost in the first round to UAB.

== Roster ==
#	Name	Height	Weight (lbs.)	Position	Class	Hometown	Previous Team(s)
00	Joseph Harris	6'5"	180	F	Sr.	Lejeune, NC, U.S.	Lejeune HS
1	Marcus Macellari	6'7"	225	F	Fr.	Granger, IN, U.S.	St. Joseph's HS
2	Anthony Raffa	6'0"	165	G	So.	Strathmere, NJ, U.S.	Wildwood Catholic HS; Albany
3	Danny Nieman	6'1"	185	G	Fr.	Concord, NC, U.S.	Hargrave Military Academy
5	Sam McLaurin	6'8"	215	F	Fr.	Havana, FL, U.S.	East Gadsden HS
10	Logan Johnson	6'6"	190	G/F	Sr.	Knoxville, TN, U.S.	South-Doyle HS
11	Dexter Moore	6'2"	175	G	So.	Bluefield, WV, U.S.	Hargrave Military Academy
21	Chris Evans	6'7"	190	F	Fr.	Chesapeake, VA, U.S.	Petersburg HS
24	Tre Lee	6'3"	190	G	Fr.	Hampton, VA, U.S.	Bethel HS
30	Chad Gray	6'7"	200	F	Jr.	Kingstree, SC, U.S.	Florida Prep; South Carolina
32	Mario Edwards	6'3"	205	G	Sr.	Massillon, OH, U.S.	Washington HS
34	Jordan Griffin	6'2"	180	G	So.	Edgewood, KY, U.S.	St Henry HS; Thomas More
40	Jon Pack	6'10"	255	C	So.	Dallas, GA, U.S.	East Paulding HS
55	Kierre Greenwood	6'2"	165	G	Fr.	Cincinnati, OH, U.S.	Winton Woods HS

== Schedule and results ==
- All times are Eastern

Date time, TV	Rank^{#}	Opponent^{#}	Result	Record	Site (attendance) city, state
Regular Season
11/13/2009*; 7:30pm		College of Charleston	W 70–59	1–0	Kimbel Arena (1,062); Conway, SC
11/16/2009*; 7:00pm, ESPNU		at No. 9 Duke; NIT Season Tip-Off	L 49–74	1–1	Cameron Indoor Stadium (9,314); Durham, NC
11/17/2009*; 8:30pm		vs. Elon; NIT Season Tip-Off	W 69–46	2–1	Cameron Indoor Stadium (9,314); Durham, NC
11/21/2009*; 2:00pm		Voorhees	W 99–56	3–1	Kimbel Arena (833); Conway, SC
11/23/2009*; 5:30pm		vs. Indiana State; NIT Season Tip-Off	W 77–62	4–1	E. A. Diddle Arena; Bowling Green, KY
11/24/2009*; 5:30pm		vs. Cal State Northridge; NIT Season Tip-Off	L 69–76	4–2	E. A. Diddle Arena; Bowling Green, KY
11/28/2009*; 4:00pm		Allen	W 97–44	5–2	Kimbel Arena (878); Conway, SC
12/3/2009; 9:00pm, MASN		at VMI	W 111–97	6–2 (1–0)	Cameron Hall (1,815); Lexington, VA
12/5/2009; 7:00pm		at Liberty	W 73–58	7–2 (2–0)	Vines Center (2,382); Lynchburg, VA
12/12/2009*; 2:00pm		Bridgewater	W 91–42	8–2	Kimbel Arena (823); Conway, SC
12/15/2009*; 7:00pm		at Georgia Southern	W 69–58	9–2	Hanner Fieldhouse (1,235); Statesboro, GA
12/19/2009*; 2:00pm		Savannah State	W 91–70	10–2	Kimbel Arena (979); Conway, SC
12/27/2009*; 7:00pm		Cornell	W 79–48	11–2	Kimbel Arena (752); Conway, SC
12/29/2009*; 7:30pm		Georgia Southern	W 76–64	12–2	Kimbel Arena (968); Conway, SC
1/2/2010; 2:00pm		Winthrop	W 57–47	13–2 (3–0)	Kimbel Arena (1,029); Conway, SC
1/4/2010; 7:00pm		Presbyterian	W 76–62	14–2 (4–0)	Kimbel Arena (1,039); Conway, SC
1/7/2010; 2:00pm		at UNC Asheville	W 58–57	15–2 (5–0)	Justice Center (502); Asheville, NC
1/9/2010; 7:00pm		at Gardner–Webb	W 80–64	16–2 (6–0)	Paul Porter Arena (1,562); Boiling Springs, NC
1/14/2010; 7:00pm		Radford	L 52–62	16–3 (6–1)	Kimbel Arena (1,083); Conway, SC
1/16/2010; 2:00pm		High Point	W 75–58	17–3 (7–1)	Kimbel Arena (1,052); Conway, SC
1/23/2010; 7:30pm		at Charleston Southern	W 64–56	18–3 (8–1)	CSU Field House (1,029); Charleston, SC
1/28/2010; 7:00pm		at Presbyterian	W 64–46	19–3 (9–1)	Templeton Physical Education Center (640); Clinton, SC
1/30/2010; 4:00pm		at Winthrop	L 64–67	19–4 (9–2)	Winthrop Coliseum (2,407); Rock Hill, SC
2/4/2010; 7:00pm		Gardner–Webb	W 96–60	20–4 (10–2)	Kimbel Arena (1,042); Conway, SC
2/6/2010; 4:30pm		UNC Asheville	W 98–62	21–4 (11–2)	Kimbel Arena (1,095); Conway, SC
2/11/2010; 7:00pm		at High Point	L 65–69	21–5 (11–3)	Millis Center (1,387); High Point, NC
2/13/2010; 7:00pm		at Radford	W 52–51	22–5 (12–3)	Dedmon Center (2,175); Radford, VA
2/15/2010*; 7:00pm		at North Carolina Central	W 68–57	23–5	McLendon-McDougald Gymnasium (2,421); Durham, NC
2/20/2010; 6:00pm		Charleston Southern	W 47–37	24–5 (13–3)	Kimbel Arena (1,042); Conway, SC
2/25/2010; 7:00pm		Liberty	W 71–48	25–5 (14–3)	Kimbel Arena (1,052); Conway, SC
2/27/2010; 2:00pm		VMI	W 101–71	26–5 (15–3)	Kimbel Arena (1,052); Conway, SC
Big South tournament
3/2/2010; 7:00pm	(1)	(8) VMI; Big South Quarterfinals	W 82–73	27–5	Kimbel Arena (1,102); Conway, SC
3/4/2010; 8:00pm, ESPNU	(1)	(4) UNC Asheville; Big South Semifinals	W 92–73	28–5	Kimbel Arena (1,753); Conway, SC
3/6/2010; 4:00pm, ESPN2	(1)	(3) Winthrop; Big South Championship Game	L 53–64	28–6	Kimbel Arena (1,236); Conway, SC
NIT
3/16/2010; 8:00pm	(7 MS)	at (2 MS) UAB; NIT First Round	L 49–65	28–7	Bartow Arena (3,081); Birmingham, AL
*Non-conference game. ^{#}Rankings from AP Poll. (#) Tournament seedings in parentheses. MS=NIT Mississippi State bracket.
