= Buzz Peterson =

American basketball executive (born 1963)

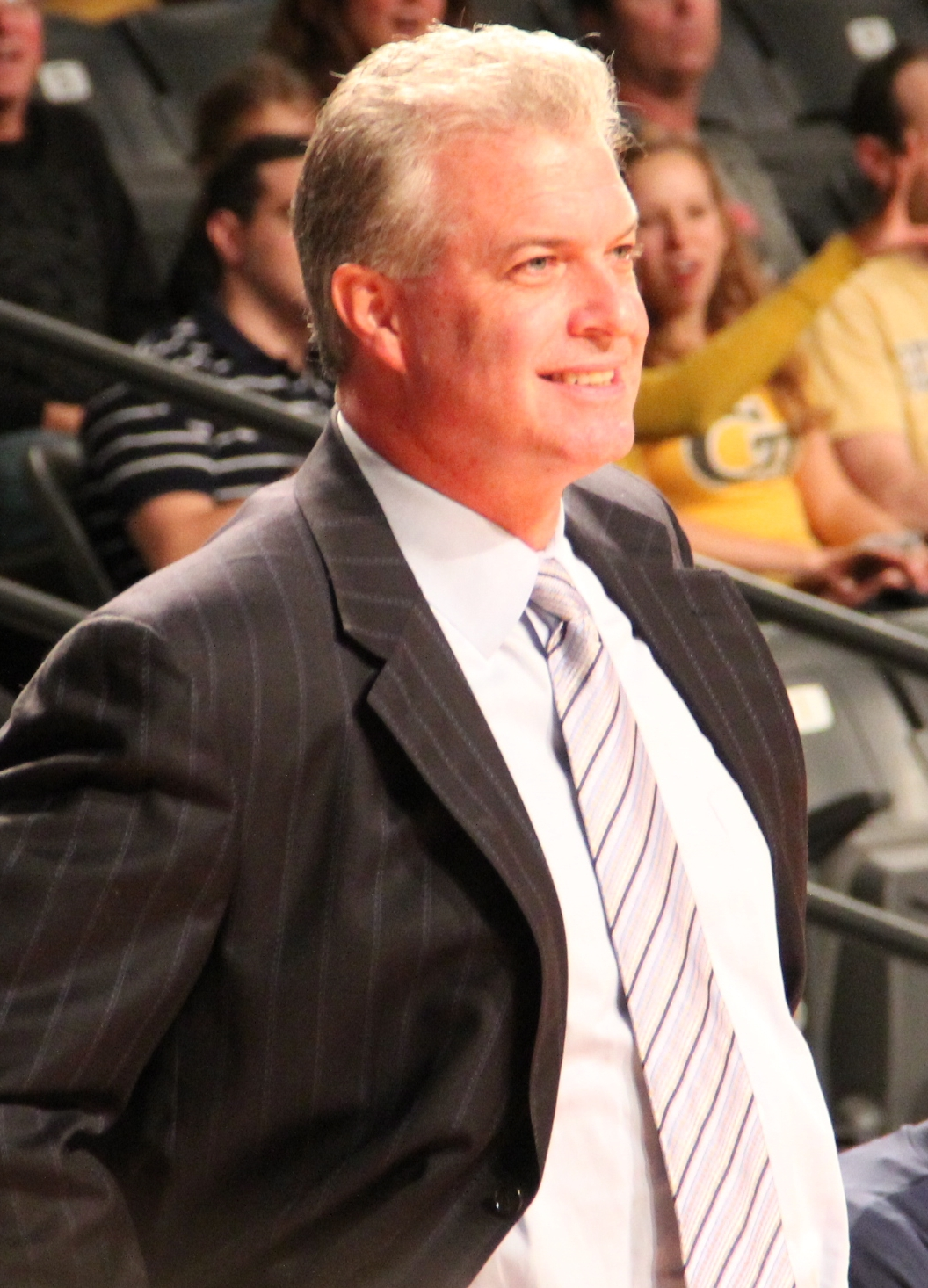
- Peterson in 2012

Biographical details
- Born: May 17, 1963 (age 63); Asheville, North Carolina, U.S.

Playing career
- 1981–1985: North Carolina

Coaching career (HC unless noted)
- 1987–1989: Appalachian State (assistant)
- 1989–1990: East Tennessee State (assistant)
- 1990–1993: NC State (assistant)
- 1993–1996: Vanderbilt (assistant)
- 1996–2000: Appalachian State
- 2000–2001: Tulsa
- 2001–2005: Tennessee
- 2005–2007: Coastal Carolina
- 2009–2010: Appalachian State
- 2010–2014: UNC Wilmington

Head coaching record
- Overall: 267–227 (.540)
- Tournaments: 0–1 (NCAA Division I); 5–2 (NIT); 2–1 (CIT)

Accomplishments and honors

Championships
- As player: NCAA champion (1982); As coach: NIT (2001); SoCon tournament (2000); 2 SoCon regular season (1998, 2000)

Awards
- SoCon Coach of the Year (1998); McDonald's All-American (1981); Fourth-team Parade All-American (1981)

Robert Bower "Buzz" Peterson Jr. (born May 17, 1963) is an American basketball executive who was the assistant general manager for the Charlotte Hornets of the National Basketball Association (NBA). He currently is a contracted high major division one college basketball talent evaluator for schools like the North Carolina Tar Heels. He has also coached college basketball, most recently as the head coach of the UNC Wilmington Seahawks men's basketball team. He was fired by UNC Wilmington at the conclusion of the 2014 season. Peterson was the head coach of the Tennessee Volunteers basketball team for four years before being fired in 2005. He previously coached a second stint at Appalachian State—he coached the 2009–10 Mountaineers, as well as the 1996 to 2000 squads. Previously, he was the men's basketball head coach at the University of Tulsa and at Coastal Carolina University, a position he held until mid-2007, when he left the program to be executive (Director of Player Personnel) with the Charlotte Bobcats of the NBA.

Peterson, a standout at Asheville High School, was named the 1981 high school player of the year in North Carolina over Michael Jordan. He was named both a McDonald's and Parade All-American. He played basketball for Dean Smith at University of North Carolina at Chapel Hill where he was a roommate of Jordan, who later was best man at Peterson's wedding. Peterson was a member of the Tar Heels team that won the 1982 national championship. He was later drafted in 1985 by the Cleveland Cavaliers in the seventh round of that year's NBA draft but chose to play overseas.

In his first stint as head coach at Appalachian State, he led the Mountaineers to the Southern Conference Tournament Championship during the 1999–2000 season. During his single season at Tulsa, 2000–01, Peterson led the Golden Hurricane to their second NIT championship.

Peterson was a special adviser to basketball operations for the Charlotte Hornets in 2016–17. In June 2017, he was promoted to assistant general manager. In 2018, Peterson became the interim general manager for the Hornets when Rich Cho was fired by the team. The position was permanently filled near the end of the season by former Los Angeles Lakers general manager Mitch Kupchak.

== Head coaching record ==
Record table
Season	Team	Overall	Conference	Standing	Postseason
Appalachian State Mountaineers (Southern Conference) (1996–2000)
1996–97	Appalachian State	14–14	8–6	3rd (North)	
1997–98	Appalachian State	21–8	13–2	T–1st (North)	
1998–99	Appalachian State	21–8	13–3	1st (North)	
1999–00	Appalachian State	23–9	13–3	1st (North)	NCAA Division I First Round
Appalachian State:		79–39	47–14		
Tulsa Golden Hurricane (Western Athletic Conference) (2000–2001)
2000–01	Tulsa	26–11	10–6	T–2nd	NIT Champion
Tulsa:		26–11	10–6		
Tennessee Volunteers (Southeastern Conference) (2001–2005)
2001–02	Tennessee	15–16	7–9	4th (Eastern)	
2002–03	Tennessee	17–12	9–7	4th (Eastern)	NIT First Round
2003–04	Tennessee	15–14	7–9	T–5th (Eastern)	NIT First Round
2004–05	Tennessee	14–17	6–10	5th (Eastern)	
Tennessee:		61–59	29–35		
Coastal Carolina Chanticleers (Big South Conference) (2005–2007)
2005–06	Coastal Carolina	20–10	12–4	T–2nd	
2006–07	Coastal Carolina	15–15	7–7	4th	
Coastal Carolina:		35–25	19–11		
Appalachian State Mountaineers (Southern Conference) (2009–2010)
2009–10	Appalachian State	24–13	13–5	1st (North)	CIT Semifinal
Appalachian State:		103–52	60–19		
UNC Wilmington Seahawks (Colonial Athletic Association) (2010–2014)
2010–11	UNC Wilmington	13–17	7–11	8th	
2011–12	UNC Wilmington	10–20	5–13	T–8th	
2012–13	UNC Wilmington	10–20	5–13	9th	
2013–14	UNC Wilmington	9–23	3–13	9th	
UNC Wilmington:		42–80	20–50		
Total:		267–227			
National champion Postseason invitational champion Conference regular season champion Conference regular season and conference tournament champion Division regular season champion Division regular season and conference tournament champion Conference tournament champion
