= 2009–10 Wofford Terriers men's basketball team =

American college basketball season

2009–10 Wofford Terriers men's basketball

SoCon regular season and tournament champions

NCAA tournament, First round
- Conference: Southern Conference
- Record: 26–9 (15–3 SoCon)
- Head coach: Mike Young (8th season)
- Assistant coaches: Paul Harrison; Mark Prosser; Jay McAuley
- Home arena: Benjamin Johnson Arena

2009–10 Southern Conference men's basketball standings
	Conf.				Overall
Team	W		L	PCT	W		L	PCT
North
Appalachian State	13	–	5	.722	24	–	12	.667
Western Carolina	11	–	7	.611	22	–	12	.647
Chattanooga	6	–	12	.333	15	–	18	.455
UNC Greensboro	6	–	12	.333	8	–	23	.258
Samford	5	–	13	.278	11	–	20	.355
Elon	5	–	13	.278	9	–	23	.281
South
Wofford†	15	–	3	.833	26	–	9	.743
College of Charleston	14	–	4	.778	22	–	12	.647
Davidson	11	–	7	.611	16	–	15	.516
The Citadel	9	–	9	.500	16	–	16	.500
Furman	7	–	11	.389	13	–	17	.433
Georgia Southern	6	–	12	.333	9	–	23	.281
† SoCon Tournament winner As of March 22, 2010; Rankings from AP Poll

The 2009–10 Wofford Terriers men's basketball team represented Wofford College during the 2009–10 college basketball season. This was head coach Mike Young's eighth season at Wofford. The Terriers competed in the Southern Conference and played their home games at the Benjamin Johnson Arena. They finished the season 26–9, 15–3 in SoCon play to capture the regular season championship. They also won the 2010 Southern Conference men's basketball tournament to receive the conference's automatic bid to the 2010 NCAA Division I men's basketball tournament. In their first ever tournament, Wofford earned a 13 seed in the East Region where they were defeated in the first round by 4 seed and AP #16 Wisconsin.

== Roster ==
#	Name	Height	Weight (lbs.)	Position	Class	Hometown	Previous Team(s)
1	Cameron Rundles	6'1"	190	G	Jr.	Minneapolis, MN	DeLaSalle HS
2	Nathan Parker	6'6"	200	F	Fr.	Knoxville, TN	Bearden HS
3	Junior Salters	6'2"	200	G	Sr.	Spartanburg, SC	Broome HS
5	Jamar Diggs	6'2"	180	G	Jr.	Minneapolis, MN	DeLaSalle HS
10	Kevin Giltner	6'6"	200	G	So.	Kingston Springs, TN	Harpeth HS
12	Taylor Wagener	6'3"	185	G	Fr.	Charlotte, NC	Charlotte Christian HS
15	Matt Steelman	6'2"	180	G	So.	Central, SC	Daniel HS
21	Drew Crowell	6'9"	230	F	Jr.	Charleston, SC	West Ashley HS
22	Jason Dawson	5'10"	170	G	So.	Columbus, OH	Fork Union Military Academy
25	Joseph Tecklenburg	6'4"	200	F	So.	Charleston, SC	Bishop England HS
33	Corey Godzinski	6'9"	210	F	Sr.	Clermont, FL	East Ridge HS
35	Brad Loesing	6'0"	180	G	So.	Cincinnati, OH	St. Xavier HS
41	Tim Johnson	6'6"	228	F	Jr.	Memphis, TN	Evangelical Christian HS
42	Noah Dahlman	6'6"	215	F	Jr.	Braham, MN	Braham Area HS
50	Terry Martin	6'6"	235	F	Jr.	Cincinnati, OH	Moeller HS
53	Domas Rinksalis	6'9"	220	F	Fr.	Šiauliai, Lithuania	Greensboro Day School

== Schedule and results ==
- All times are Eastern

Date time, TV	Rank^{#}	Opponent^{#}	Result	Record	Site (attendance) city, state
Regular Season
11/13/2009*; 8:00pm		at Pittsburgh	L 60–63	0–1	Petersen Events Center (10,112); Pittsburgh, PA
11/17/2009*; 7:00pm		at Georgia	W 60–57	1–1	Stegeman Coliseum (4,629); Athens, GA
11/19/2009*; 7:00pm		Lees–McRae	W 81–39	2–1	Benjamin Johnson Arena (617); Spartanburg, SC
11/22/2009*; 7:00pm		at Bradley; Las Vegas Invitational	L 54–56	2–2	Carver Arena (8,906); Peoria, IL
11/24/2009*; 9:45pm		at No. 21 Illinois; Las Vegas Invitational	L 64–78	2–3	Assembly Hall (12,982); Champaign, IL
11/27/2009*; 2:00pm		vs. Southern; Las Vegas Invitational	W 81–66	3–3	Orleans Arena (NA); Las Vegas, NV
11/28/2009*; 4:30pm		vs. Seattle; Las Vegas Invitational	W 84–83	4–3	Orleans Arena (NA); Las Vegas, NV
12/2/2009; 7:30pm		at Western Carolina	L 67–72	4–4 (0–1)	Ramsey Center (1,527); Cullowhee, NC
12/4/2009*; 7:00pm, Big Ten Network		at No. 9 Michigan State	L 60–72	4–5	Breslin Center (14,759); East Lansing, MI
12/7/2009; 7:00pm		Appalachian State	L 76–77	4–6 (0–2)	Benjamin Johnson Arena (1,316); Spartanburg, SC
12/12/2009*; 3:00pm		Navy	W 73–62	5–6	Benjamin Johnson Arena (1,473); Spartanburg, SC
12/19/2009*; 7:00pm, SportSouth		South Carolina	W 68–61	6–6	Benjamin Johnson Arena (3,500); Spartanburg, SC
12/21/2009*; 12:30pm		UNC Asheville	W 68–42	7–6	Justice Center (508); Asheville, NC
12/29/2009*; 11:00pm		vs. Kent State; Cable Car Classic	L 66–73	7–7	Leavey Center (NA); Santa Clara, CA
12/30/2009*; 9:00pm		at Santa Clara; Cable Car Classic	W 80–72	8–7	Leavey Center (1,103); Santa Clara, CA
1/7/2010; 7:00pm		at UNC Greensboro	W 79–66	9–7 (1–2)	Greensboro Coliseum (1,565); Greensboro, NC
1/9/2010; 7:00pm		at Elon	W 72–55	10–7 (2–2)	Alumni Gym (1,102); Elon, NC
1/14/2010; 7:00pm		Georgia Southern	W 71–57	11–7 (3–2)	Benjamin Johnson Arena (1,159); Spartanburg, SC
1/16/2010; 7:00pm		Davidson	W 68–62	12–7 (4–2)	Benjamin Johnson Arena (2,448); Spartanburg, SC
1/21/2010; 7:05pm		at The Citadel	W 44–42	13–7 (5–2)	McAlister Field House (1,857); Charleston, SC
1/22/2010; 7:00pm, ESPN2		at College of Charleston	L 68–70	13–8 (5–3)	Carolina First Arena (5,175); Charleston, SC
1/25/2010; 7:00pm		Chattanooga	W 78–63	14–8 (6–3)	Benjamin Johnson Arena (1,573); Spartanburg, SC
1/30/2010; 3:00pm		Furman	W 57–46	15–8 (7–3)	Benjamin Johnson Arena (1,124); Spartanburg, SC
2/3/2010; 7:00pm		Elon	W 72–56	16–8 (8–3)	Benjamin Johnson Arena (1,316); Spartanburg, SC
2/6/2010; 7:00pm		UNC Greensboro	W 77–59	17–8 (9–3)	Benjamin Johnson Arena (2,006); Spartanburg, SC
2/10/2010; 7:00pm, WMYA		at Furman	W 76–65	18–8 (10–3)	Timmons Arena (1,304); Greenville, SC
2/13/2010; 3:00pm		at Samford	W 59–54	19–8 (11–3)	Pete Hanna Center (1,234); Birmingham, AL
2/17/2010; 7:00pm		at Davidson	W 73–51	20–8 (12–3)	John M. Belk Arena (4,211); Davidson, NC
2/20/2010; 2:30pm		at Georgia Southern	W 82–76 ^{OT}	21–8 (13–3)	Hanner Fieldhouse (2,483); Statesboro, GA
2/25/2010; 7:00pm, CSS		College of Charleston	W 74–68	22–8 (14–3)	Benjamin Johnson Arena (3,500); Spartanburg, SC
2/27/2010; 3:00pm		The Citadel	W 75–66	23–8 (15–3)	Benjamin Johnson Arena (3,015); Spartanburg, SC
2010 Southern Conference men's basketball tournament
3/6/2010; 4:30pm	(1 S)	vs. (4 N) UNC Greensboro; Quarterfinals	W 59–47	24–8	Bojangles' Coliseum (4,806); Charlotte, NC
3/7/2010; 6:00pm, SportSouth	(1 S)	vs. (2 N) Western Carolina; Semifinals	W 77–58	25–8	Time Warner Cable Arena (NA); Charlotte, NC
3/8/2010; 9:00pm, ESPN2	(1 S)	vs. (1 N) Appalachian State; Championship Game	W 56–51	26–8	Time Warner Cable Arena (6,193); Charlotte, NC
2010 NCAA Division I men's basketball tournament
3/19/2010; 3:05pm, CBS	(13 E)	vs. (4 E) No. 16 Wisconsin; First Round	L 49–53	26–9	Jacksonville Veterans Memorial Arena (10,657); Jacksonville, FL
*Non-conference game. ^{#}Rankings from AP. (#) Tournament seedings in parentheses. E=NCAA East Regional.
