= 2009–10 Charleston Cougars men's basketball team =

American college basketball season

2009–10 Charleston Cougars men's basketball

CBI, Quarterfinals
- Conference: Southern Conference
- Record: 22–12 (14–4 SoCon)
- Head coach: Bobby Cremins
- Assistant coaches: Mark Byington; Fred Dupree; Andrew Wilson
- Home arena: Carolina First Arena

2009–10 Southern Conference men's basketball standings
	Conf.				Overall
Team	W		L	PCT	W		L	PCT
North
Appalachian State	13	–	5	.722	24	–	12	.667
Western Carolina	11	–	7	.611	22	–	12	.647
Chattanooga	6	–	12	.333	15	–	18	.455
UNC Greensboro	6	–	12	.333	8	–	23	.258
Samford	5	–	13	.278	11	–	20	.355
Elon	5	–	13	.278	9	–	23	.281
South
Wofford†	15	–	3	.833	26	–	9	.743
College of Charleston	14	–	4	.778	22	–	12	.647
Davidson	11	–	7	.611	16	–	15	.516
The Citadel	9	–	9	.500	16	–	16	.500
Furman	7	–	11	.389	13	–	17	.433
Georgia Southern	6	–	12	.333	9	–	23	.281
† SoCon Tournament winner As of March 22, 2010; Rankings from AP Poll

The 2009–10 College of Charleston Cougars men's basketball team represented the College of Charleston in the 2009–10 college basketball season. This was head coach Bobby Cremins's fourth season at College of Charleston. The Cougars compete in the Southern Conference and played their home games at Carolina First Arena. They finished the season 22–12, 14–4 in SoCon play and advanced to the semifinals of the 2010 Southern Conference men's basketball tournament before losing to Appalachian State. They were invited to the 2010 College Basketball Invitational where they advanced to the quarterfinals before losing to VCU.

== Roster ==
#	Name	Height	Weight (lbs.)	Position	Class	Hometown	Previous Team(s)
1	Donavan Monroe	6'2"	205	G	Jr.	Waxhaw, NC	Fork Union Military Academy
2	Matt Sundberg	6'8"	195	F	So.	Kennesaw, GA	Harrison HS
3	Andrew Goudelock	6'2"	200	G	Jr.	Lilburn, GA	Stone Mountain HS
4	Andrew Lawrence	6'1"	185	G	Fr.	London, England	Heat Academy
5	Rashad Wright	6'9"	200	C	Fr.	Agawam, MA	South Kent School
12	Quasim Pugh	6'0"	175	G	So.	Brooklyn, NY	St. Thomas More HS
14	Bart Benton	6'0"	170	G	Fr.	Monroe, GA	George Walton Academy
21	Jeremy Simmons	6'8"	230	F	Jr.	Lithonia, GA	Tucker HS
30	Antwaine Wiggins	6'7"	185	F	Jr.	Greeneville, TN	Greeneville HS
32	Tony White Jr.	6'0"	150	G	Sr.	Knoxville, TN	Bearden HS
35	Jordan Turok	6'1"	190	G	Jr.	Chapin, SC	Chapin HS
41	Garrett Campbell	6'58	230	F	Sr.	Myrtle Beach, SC	Myrtle Beach HS
42	Casaan Breeden	6'8"	200	F	Sr.	Clio, SC	Marlboro County HS; Florida State
53	Willis Hall	6'6"	215	F	Fr.	Charlotte, NC	Charlotte Christian School

== Schedule and results ==
Date time, TV	Rank^{#}	Opponent^{#}	Result	Record	Site (attendance) city, state
Exhibition
11/7/2009*; 5:00pm		USC Aiken	W 94–92	—	Carolina First Arena; Charleston, SC
Regular Season
11/13/2009*; 7:30pm		at Coastal Carolina	L 59–70	0–1	Kimbel Arena (1,062); Conway, SC
11/17/2009*; 7:00pm		Winthrop	W 69–57	1–1	Carolina First Arena (3,421); Charleston, SC
11/25/2009*; 7:00pm		at East Tennessee State	L 71–77	1–2	Memorial Center (3,105); Johnson City, TN
11/27/2009*; 7:00pm, CCS		at No. 9 Tennessee	L 69–86	1–3	Thompson-Boling Arena (18,293); Knoxville, TN
12/3/2009; 7:00pm		Georgia Southern	W 68–59	2–3 (1–0)	Carolina First Arena (2,764); Charleston, SC
12/5/2009; 4:00pm, CSS		at Davidson	W 67–55	3–3 (2–0)	Carolina First Arena (3,062); Charleston, SC
12/7/2009; 7:00pm		at UNC Greensboro	W 67–64	4–3 (3–0)	Fleming Gymnasium (2,383); Greensboro, NC
12/16/2009*; 7:00pm		Charleston Southern	W 87–74	5–3	Carolina First Arena (3,067); Charleston, SC
12/19/2009*; 7:30pm		at Clemson	L 55–94	5–4	Littlejohn Coliseum (8,308); Clemson, SC
12/23/2009*; 12:30am, ESPNU		at Hawai'i; Diamond Head Classic	L 71–84	5–5	Stan Sheriff Center (7,119); Honolulu, HI
12/24/2009*; 2:00am, ESPNU		vs. SMU; Diamond Head Classic	W 72–71	6–5	Stan Sheriff Center (6,416); Honolulu, HI
12/25/2009*; 4:30pm, ESPNU		vs. Western Michigan; Diamond Head Classic	L 63–66	6–6	Stan Sheriff Center (5,402); Honolulu, HI
1/2/2010*; 4:00pm		South Carolina State	W 88–73	7–6	Carolina First Arena (2,734); Charleston, SC
1/4/2010*; 7:00pm, ESPNU		No. 9 North Carolina	W 82–79 ^{OT}	8–6	Carolina First Arena (5,072); Charleston, SC
1/9/2010; 7:05pm		at The Citadel	W 61–55	9–6 (4–0)	McAlister Field House (5,370); Charleston, SC
1/14/2010; 9:00pm, CSS		at Samford	W 78–67	10–6 (5–0)	Pete Hanna Center (1,737); Homewood, AL
1/16/2010; 2:30pm, SportSouth		at Chattanooga	W 90–66	11–6 (6–0)	McKenzie Arena (4,389); Chattanooga, TN
1/21/2010; 7:00pm, CSS		Furman	W 92–80	12–6 (7–0)	Carolina First Arena (3,248); Charleston, SC
1/22/2010; 7:00pm, ESPN2		Wofford	W 70–68	13–6 (8–0)	Carolina First Arena (5,175); Charleston, SC
1/25/2010; 7:00pm, CSS		at Western Carolina	L 90–100	13–7 (8–1)	Ramsey Center (4,765); Cullowhee, NC
1/28/2010; 7:00pm		at Davidson	L 71–86	13–8 (8–2)	John M. Belk Arena (4,619); Davidson, NC
1/30/2010; 1:00pm		at Georgia Southern	W 90–72	14–8 (9–2)	Hanner Fieldhouse (2,022); Statesboro, GA
2/4/2010; 7:00pm		Chattanooga	W 86–74	15–8 (10–2)	Carolina First Arena (4,015); Charleston, SC
2/6/2010; 4:00pm, SportSouth		Samford	W 75–54	16–8 (11–2)	Carolina First Arena (5,031); Charleston, SC
2/8/2010; 7:00pm, CSS		at The Citadel	L 65–72	16–9 (11–3)	Carolina First Arena (5,154); Charleston, SC
2/11/2010; 7:00pm		Elon	W 80–77	17–9 (12–3)	Carolina First Arena (3,023); Charleston, SC
2/17/2010; 7:00pm		Appalachian State	W 73–72	18–9 (13–3)	Carolina First Arena (5,122); Charleston, SC
2/20/2010*; 8:00pm, ESPN2		at George Mason; ESPN BracketBusters	W 85–83	19–9	Patriot Center (8,370); Fairfax, VA
2/25/2010; 7:00pm, CSS		at Wofford	L 68–74	19–10 (13–4)	Benjamin Johnson Arena (3,500); Spartanburg, SC
2/27/2010; 4:00pm		at Furman	W 69–66	20–10 (14–4)	Timmons Arena (2,208); Greenville, SC
Southern Conference tournament
3/6/2010; 9:30pm	(S2)	vs. (N3) Chattanooga; SoCon Quarterfinals	W 96–69	21–10	Bojangles' Coliseum; Charlotte, NC
3/7/2010; 8:30pm	(S2)	vs. (N1) Appalachian State; SoCon Semifinals	L 54–77	21–11	Bojangles' Coliseum (5,440); Charlotte, NC
CBI
3/17/2010; 7:00pm		at FIU; CBI First Round	W 82–79	22–11	McBrayer Arena (1,750); Richmond, KY
3/22/2010; 7:00pm, HDNet		at VCU; CBI Quarterfinals	L 86–93	22–12	Stuart C. Siegel Center (3,297); Richmond, VA
*Non-conference game. ^{#}Rankings from AP Poll. (#) Tournament seedings in parentheses. All times are in Eastern Time. Source
