= 2000 Southern Conference men's basketball tournament =

- Classification: Division I
- Season: 1999–00
- Teams: 12
- Site: BI-LO Center; Greenville, SC
- Champions: Appalachian State (2nd title)
- Winning coach: Buzz Peterson (1st title)

1999–2000 Southern Conference men's basketball standings
	Conf.				Overall
Team	W		L	PCT	W		L	PCT
North
Appalachian State†	13	–	3	.813	23	–	9	.719
Davidson	10	–	6	.625	15	–	13	.536
UNC Greensboro	9	–	7	.563	15	–	13	.536
East Tennessee State	8	–	8	.500	14	–	15	.483
Western Carolina	7	–	9	.438	14	–	14	.500
VMI	1	–	15	.063	6	–	23	.207
South
College of Charleston	13	–	3	.813	24	–	6	.800
Georgia Southern	10	–	6	.625	16	–	12	.571
Wofford	8	–	8	.500	14	–	16	.467
Chattanooga	6	–	10	.375	10	–	19	.345
The Citadel	5	–	10	.333	9	–	20	.310
Furman	5	–	10	.333	14	–	18	.438
† SoCon Tournament winner As of April 30, 2000; Rankings from AP poll

The 2000 Southern Conference men's basketball tournament took place from March 2–5, 2000 at the BI-LO Center in Greenville, South Carolina. The Appalachian State Mountaineers won their second Southern Conference title and received the automatic berth to the 2000 NCAA tournament.

== Format ==
All twelve teams were eligible for the tournament. The tournament used a preset bracket consisting of four rounds, the first of which featured four games, with the winners moving on to the quarterfinal round. The top two finishers in each division received first round byes.

== Bracket ==
First round March 2
4S	Chattanooga	90
5N	Western Carolina	75
3N	UNC Greensboro	61
6S	Furman	77
4N	East Tennessee St.	85
5S	The Citadel	71
3S	Wofford	81
6N	VMI	72

Quarterfinals; March 3
1N	Appalachian State	88
4S	Chattanooga	66
2S	Georgia Southern	54
6S	Furman	68
1S	Coll. of Charleston	65
4N	East Tennessee St.	51
2N	Davidson	64
3S	Wofford	65

Semifinals; March 4
1N	Appalachian State	60
6S	Furman	56
1S	Coll. of Charleston	74
3S	Wofford	64

Finals; March 5
1N	Appalachian State	68
1S	Coll. of Charleston	56

* Overtime game

== See also ==
- List of Southern Conference men's basketball champions
