= 2009–10 VMI Keydets basketball team =

American college basketball season

2009–10 VMI Keydets men's basketball
- Conference: Big South Conference
- Record: 10–19 (5–13 Big South)
- Head coach: Duggar Baucom (5th season)
- Assistant coaches: Daniel Willis (5th season); Jack Castleberry (2nd season); Jason Allison (5th season)
- Home arena: Cameron Hall

2009–10 Big South men's basketball standings
	Conf.				Overall
Team	W		L	PCT	W		L	PCT
Coastal Carolina	15	–	3	.833	28	–	7	.800
Radford	13	–	5	.722	19	–	12	.613
Winthrop †	12	–	6	.667	19	–	14	.576
UNC Asheville	11	–	7	.611	15	–	16	.484
High Point	10	–	8	.556	15	–	15	.500
Liberty	10	–	8	.556	15	–	16	.484
Charleston Southern	7	–	11	.389	13	–	17	.433
VMI	5	–	13	.278	10	–	19	.345
Gardner-Webb	5	–	13	.278	8	–	21	.276
Presbyterian	2	–	16	.111	5	–	26	.161
† 2010 Big South tournament winner As of March 16, 2010; Rankings from AP Poll

The 2009–10 VMI Keydets basketball team represented the Virginia Military Institute during the 2009-10 NCAA Division I men's basketball season. The Keydets were coached by Duggar Baucom in his 5th year at VMI, and played their home games at Cameron Hall. It was VMI's 6th season in the Big South Conference and the Keydets' 102nd season of basketball.

The Keydets failed to improve upon their 24–8 campaign from the previous season, and were defeated in the quarterfinals of the Big South tournament by Coastal Carolina.

== Roster ==
2009–10 VMI Keydets men's basketball team
Players
Coaches

Pos.	#	Name	Height	Weight	Year	Hometown
G	1	Adam Lonon	5 ft 11 in (1.8 m)	175 lb (79 kg)	Sr	Richmond, VA
G	10	Austin Kenon	5 ft 11 in (1.8 m)	180 lb (82 kg)	Jr	Virginia Beach, VA
F	11	Stan Okoye	6 ft 5 in (1.96 m)	195 lb (88 kg)	Fr	Raleigh, NC
G	14	Joe Carr	6 ft 3 in (1.91 m)	195 lb (88 kg)	Fr	Houston, TX
F	15	Ron Burks	6 ft 4 in (1.93 m)	215 lb (98 kg)	So	Mitchellville, MD
G	20	Carl Josey	6 ft 5 in (1.96 m)	195 lb (88 kg)	Sr	Surrey, England
F	22	Hunter Houston	6 ft 6 in (1.98 m)	195 lb (88 kg)	Jr	Birmingham, AL
G	21	Keith Gabriel	6 ft 3 in (1.91 m)	180 lb (82 kg)	So	Charlotte, NC
F	30	Nick Gore	6 ft 6 in (1.98 m)	205 lb (93 kg)	Fr	Waynesboro, VA
G	31	Michael Sparks	6 ft 4 in (1.93 m)	195 lb (88 kg)	So	Lexington, KY
C	32	Wayne Whiting	6 ft 7 in (2.01 m)	240 lb (109 kg)	So	Richmond Hill, GA
F	35	Aaron Blosser	6 ft 3 in (1.91 m)	205 lb (93 kg)	So	Virginia Beach, VA
C	50	Stephen Sargent	7 ft 0 in (2.13 m)	245 lb (111 kg)	RS So	Fayetteville, GA

Head coach

- Duggar Baucom

Assistant coach(es)

- Daniel Willis
- Jack Castleberry
- Jason Allison

Legend

- (C) Team captain
- (S) Suspended
- (I) Ineligible
- (W) Walk-on
- Injured
- Current redshirt

== Schedule ==
Date time, TV	Rank^{#}	Opponent^{#}	Result	Record	Site (attendance) city, state
Regular season
November 13*; 7:00 pm		Army	W 93–86	1–0	Cameron Hall (2,215); Lexington, VA
November 14*; 7:00 pm		at Richmond	L 59–103	1–1	Robins Center (3,802); Richmond, VA
November 18*; 7:00 pm		West Virginia Wesleyan	W 111–92	2–1	Cameron Hall (1,211); Lexington, VA
November 24*; 7:00 pm		at UNC Wilmington	L 95–115	2–2	Trask Coliseum (3,043); Wilmington, NC
November 30*; 7:00 pm		Lynchburg	W 108–93	3–2	Cameron Hall (820); Lexington, VA
December 3; 9:00 pm, MASN		Coastal Carolina	L 97–111	3–3 (0–1)	Cameron Hall (1,815); Lexington, VA
December 5; 1:00 pm		Charleston Southern	W 103–91	4–3 (1–1)	Cameron Hall (2,274); Lexington, VA
December 9*; 7:30 pm		at Virginia Tech	L 73–98	4–4	Cassell Coliseum (9,758); Blacksburg, VA
December 12*; Noon		at Seton Hall	L 107–134	4–5	Prudential Center (6,012); Newark, NJ
December 22*; 7:00 pm		at George Mason	L 86–89	4–6	Patriot Center (5,420); Fairfax, VA
January 2; 1:00 pm		Liberty	L 102–110	4–7 (1–2)	Cameron Hall (2,321); Lexington, VA
January 7; 7:00 pm		at Winthrop	L 63–96	4–8 (1–3)	Winthrop Coliseum (1,923); Rock Hill, SC
January 9; 7:00 pm		at Presbyterian	L 75–89 ^{OT}	4–9 (1–4)	Templeton Physical Education Center (675); Clinton, SC
January 11*; 7:00 pm		Randolph College	W 99–88	5–9	Cameron Hall (564); Lexington, VA
January 14; 7:00 pm		UNC Asheville	L 84–97	5–10 (1–5)	Cameron Hall (1,614); Lexington, VA
January 16; 7:00 pm		Gardner–Webb	L 84–92	5–11 (1–6)	Cameron Hall (2,317); Lexington, VA
January 21; 7:00 pm		at Raford	L 91–109	5–12 (1–7)	Dedmon Center (1,881); Radford, VA
January 23; 7:00 pm		at High Point	W 94–91	6–12 (2–7)	Millis Center (1,750); High Point, NC
January 26*; 7:00 pm		Southern Virginia	W 99–87	7–12	Cameron Hall (1,837); Lexington, VA
January 28; 7:00 pm		at Liberty	L 73–91	7–13 (2–8)	Vines Center (3,582); Lynchburg, VA
February 2; 7:00 pm		Radford	L 84–111	7–14 (2–9)	Cameron Hall (822); Lexington, VA
February 4; 7:00 pm		Presbyterian	W 97–78	8–14 (3–9)	Cameron Hall (776); Lexington, VA
February 6; 1:00 pm		Winthrop	L 83–87	8–15 (3–10)	Cameron Hall (1,653); Lexington, VA
February 11; 7:00 pm		at Gardner–Webb	W 92–85	9–15 (4–10)	Paul Porter Arena (1,250); Boiling Springs, NC
February 13; 4:30 pm		at UNC Asheville	L 97–114	9–16 (4–11)	Justice Center (1,039); Asheville, NC
February 16; 7:00 pm		High Point	W 91–84	10–16 (5–11)	Cameron Hall (1,910); Lexington, VA
February 25; 7:30 pm		at Charleston Southern	L 85–95	10–17 (5–12)	CSU Field House (695); North Charleston, SC
February 27; 2:00 pm		at Coastal Carolina	L 71–101	10–18 (5–13)	Kimbel Arena (1,052); Conway, SC
2010 Big South Conference men's basketball tournament
March 2; 7:00 pm		at Coastal Carolina; Quarterfinal	L 73–82	10–19	Kimbel Arena (1,102); Conway, SC
*Non-conference game. ^{#}Rankings from AP Poll. (#) Tournament seedings in parentheses. All times are in Eastern Time.
