= 2010 Southern Conference men's basketball tournament =

- 2010 SoCon Tournament logo
- Classification: Division I
- Season: 2009–10
- Teams: 12
- Site: Bojangles' Coliseum; Time Warner Cable Arena; Charlotte, North Carolina
- Champions: Wofford Terriers (1st title)
- Winning coach: Mike Young (1st title)
- MVP: Noah Dahlman (Wofford)
- Attendance: 6,193 (Championship game)
- Television: SportSouth, ESPN2

2009–10 Southern Conference men's basketball standings
	Conf.				Overall
Team	W		L	PCT	W		L	PCT
North
Appalachian State	13	–	5	.722	24	–	12	.667
Western Carolina	11	–	7	.611	22	–	12	.647
Chattanooga	6	–	12	.333	15	–	18	.455
UNC Greensboro	6	–	12	.333	8	–	23	.258
Samford	5	–	13	.278	11	–	20	.355
Elon	5	–	13	.278	9	–	23	.281
South
Wofford†	15	–	3	.833	26	–	9	.743
College of Charleston	14	–	4	.778	22	–	12	.647
Davidson	11	–	7	.611	16	–	15	.516
The Citadel	9	–	9	.500	16	–	16	.500
Furman	7	–	11	.389	13	–	17	.433
Georgia Southern	6	–	12	.333	9	–	23	.281
† SoCon Tournament winner As of March 22, 2010; Rankings from AP Poll

The 2010 Southern Conference men's basketball tournament took place March 5–8 in Charlotte, North Carolina. The first and quarterfinal rounds took place at Bojangles' Coliseum. The semifinals and championship game were played at Time Warner Cable Arena. The semifinals were broadcast on SportsSouth and the championship game was broadcast on ESPN2. The winner of the tournament, the Wofford Terriers, received an automatic bid to the 2010 NCAA Men's Division I Basketball Tournament. It was Wofford's first appearance.

== Bracket ==
First round Friday, March 5
S3	Davidson	59
N6	Elon	66
N4	UNC Greensboro	66
S5	Furman	65
S4	The Citadel	55
N5	Samford	43
N3	Chattanooga	82
S6	Georgia Southern	62

Quarterfinals; Saturday, March 6
N2	Western Carolina	68
N6	Elon	57
S1	Wofford	59
N4	UNC Greensboro	47
N1	Appalachian State	71
S4	The Citadel	61
S2	College of Charleston	96
N3	Chattanooga	69

Semifinals; Sunday, March 7
N2	Western Carolina	58
S1	Wofford	77
N1	Appalachian State	77
S2	College of Charleston	54

Championship Game; Monday, March 8
S1	Wofford	56
N1	Appalachian State	51

Tiebreakers:

Chattanooga and UNC Greensboro split their season series. Chattanooga was 1–1 against division leader Appalachian State, while UNC Greensboro was 0–2.

Samford swept the season series with Elon, 2–0.

== All-Tournament Team ==
First Team
Kellen Brand, Appalachian State
Donald Sims, Appalachian State
Andrew Goudelock, College of Charleston
Noah Dahlman, Wofford
Jamar Diggs, Wofford

Second Team
Tony White, Jr., College of Charleston
Ben Stywall, UNC Greensboro
Harouna Mutombo, Western Carolina
Tim Johnson, Wofford
Cameron Rundles, Wofford
