= Bobby Cremins =

American college basketball coach (born 1947)

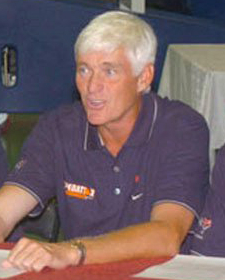

Biographical details
- Born: July 4, 1947 (age 79); The Bronx, New York, U.S.

Playing career
- 1967–1970: South Carolina
- Position: Point guard

Coaching career (HC unless noted)
- 1971–1973: Point Park (assistant)
- 1973–1975: South Carolina (assistant)
- 1975–1981: Appalachian State
- 1981–2000: Georgia Tech
- 2006–2012: College of Charleston

Head coaching record
- Overall: 579–375

Accomplishments and honors

Championships
- NCAA Division I Regional – Final Four (1990); 3 ACC tournament (1985, 1990, 1993); 2 ACC regular season (1985, 1996); SoCon tournament (1979); 4 SoCon regular season (1978, 1979, 1981, 2011)

Awards
- Naismith College Coach of the Year (1990); 3× ACC Coach of the Year (1983, 1985, 1996); 4× SoCon Coach of the Year (1976, 1978, 1981, 2011)

Robert Joseph Cremins Jr. (born July 4, 1947) is an American retired college basketball coach. He served as a head coach at Appalachian State, Georgia Tech, and the College of Charleston.

== Early years ==
Cremins was born and raised in Longwood, Bronx. He attended All Hallows High School in the Bronx, New York, where he was born to Irish immigrants from County Kerry. In 1966, he entered the University of South Carolina (USC) on a basketball scholarship, where he played under coach Frank McGuire. The South Carolina team won 61 games, with 17 losses, while Cremins was the starting point guard for three years for the Gamecocks. Cremins, known as "Cakes", was also the captain of South Carolina's 1969–70 team which went 25–3 and won USC's first (and only) ACC regular season title. He graduated from USC in 1970 with a B.S. degree in marketing, before playing professional basketball for one year in Ecuador. He was a member of the Columbia Sertoma Basketball Club team that played in the 1970 FIBA Intercontinental Cup.

== Early coaching career ==
Cremins started his coaching career in 1971 as an assistant coach at Point Park College in Pittsburgh, Pennsylvania. He next returned to South Carolina to become McGuire's assistant coach and to earn a M.S. degree in guidance and counseling in 1972.

== Appalachian State ==
At age 27, Cremins became one of the youngest NCAA Division I head coaches in history when he took charge of the basketball team at Appalachian State University. He inherited a program that had only won 22 games since joining Division I five years earlier, and had just come off the worst season in school history at 3–23. In his first year at Appalachian his team had a record of 13–14, but then they accumulated an 87–56 record over the next five seasons, with three Southern Conference regular season championships. The Mountaineers posted a 23–6 record, and received an NCAA Tournament slot in 1979 after sweeping the Southern Conference regular season and tournament titles.

== Georgia Tech ==
Cremins's performance at Appalachian State gathered him some national attention in the NCAA coaching ranks, including catching the eye of Georgia Tech athletic director Homer Rice. After Rice persuaded him to come to Atlanta, Cremins was hired as the Yellow Jackets' new head basketball coach at the close of the 1981 season, on April 14, 1981.

When Cremins arrived at Georgia Tech, he walked into a situation that was as bad, if not worse, than what he'd inherited at Appalachian State. Georgia Tech had only notched one winning season in the previous 10 years, and had just suffered the worst season in school history—a 4–23 overall record and a winless record in Atlantic Coast Conference play.

Considering the poor state of the program he'd inherited, Cremins engineered a very quick return to respectability. In only his third year in Atlanta, he led the Yellow Jackets to the 1984 NIT—their first postseason berth of any sort in 13 years. A year later, the Yellow Jackets shocked the ACC by winning a share of the regular season title, then winning the official league title in the conference tournament. They then advanced all the way to the Elite Eight, tallying an overall record of 27–8. In 1990, Cremins's team advanced all the way to the Final Four in the NCAA Tournament, with an overall 28–7 record. The 28 wins are still a school record for wins in a season.

Cremins was three times the ACC "Coach of the Year": In 1983 with the first ever Yellow Jackets' ACC tournament victory, and an overall 13–15 won/loss record; again in 1985, and again in 1996 when his team posted a 24–12 record, won the ACC regular-season championship with a 13–3 record (only the second time in 15 years that a team from North Carolina had not won at least a share of the title), and progressed to the NCAA basketball tournament's "Sweet 16" before losing to Cincinnati. Cremins' coaching of the 1990 Yellow Jackets' team earned him the Naismith College Coach of the Year honor.

Cremins had a host of players that went on to have successful NBA careers. First there was Mark Price (the Cleveland Cavaliers) and John Salley (the Detroit Pistons) in the early 1980s, followed by Duane Ferrell, Tom Hammonds, Dennis Scott, Brian Oliver, Kenny Anderson, Jon Barry, Travis Best, Stephon Marbury, Jason Collier and Matt Harpring.

Cremins was an assistant coach on the first-ever gold medal-winning American World University Games team in 1986, assisting the head coach Lute Olson of the University of Arizona. Cremins also assisted Olson at the 1986 FIBA World Championship, also winning the gold medal there. During the summer of 1989 he coached the American team that qualified for the 1990 FIBA World Championship.

Cremins assisted former NBA coach Lenny Wilkens in the American basketball team's appearance in the Summer Olympic Games of 1996 in Atlanta. This team was the second of the "Dream Teams" in the Olympic Games, and it featured such NBA stars as Charles Barkley, Karl Malone, Reggie Miller, Shaquille O'Neal, Scottie Pippen, David Robinson and John Stockton, several of whom were returning for their second Olympic Games basketball tournament. This "Dream Team" was undefeated in the Olympic basketball tournament, of course, and it defeated the second-place Yugoslavian team 95–69 in the championship game in winning the gold medal.

On March 24, 1993, Cremins agreed to coach basketball at his alma mater, the University of South Carolina, before changing his mind and deciding three days later to continue at Georgia Tech. In 2003, Georgia Tech officially named the basketball court at the Alexander Memorial Coliseum on the Georgia Tech campus, the "Cremins Court". Paul Hewitt would take his place at Georgia Tech in 2000.

Cremins announced his retirement after the 1999–2000 season with a 25-year coaching record of 452–303 (a winning percentage of .599), and with a Georgia Tech coaching record of 354–237 in 19 seasons (also a .599 winning percentage). He is far and away the winningest coach in Georgia Tech history.

Cremins was a member of the 2006 induction class in the Georgia Tech Sports Hall of Fame.

== College of Charleston ==
Turning down numerous offers to coach during his retirement, and even an occasional athletic directors job, Cremins toured the country doing motivational speaking, did television commentary on ACC and NCAA basketball, and worked with charities, mainly for Coaches vs. Cancer and the Jimmy V Foundation. Cremins also raised money for a five-to-six week summer program, half of which include disadvantaged children, the Hilton Head Basketball Camp 101.

In 2006, Cremins returned to coaching at the College of Charleston, hoping to restore the basketball program there to the mid-major power status that it experienced under coach John Kresse from 1980 to 2002. To some degree, Cremins succeeded, leading the team to four twenty-win seasons in his six seasons there, in addition to signing the highest-rated high school recruit in school history, Adjehi Baru. Another highlight of Cremins' tenure was a home upset over a North Carolina team ranked number nine in the country on January 4, 2010.

Having taken a medical leave of absence on January 27, 2012, which lasted for the duration of the 2011–2012 season, Cremins retired from coaching on March 19, 2012, citing physical exhaustion.

== Head coaching record ==
Record table
Season	Team	Overall	Conference	Standing	Postseason
Appalachian State Mountaineers (Southern Conference) (1975–1981)
1975–76	Appalachian State	13–14	6–6	5th	
1976–77	Appalachian State	17–12	8–4	3rd	
1977–78	Appalachian State	15–13	9–3	1st	
1978–79	Appalachian State	23–6	11–3	1st	NCAA Division I Second Round
1979–80	Appalachian State	12–16	6–10	T–6th	
1980–81	Appalachian State	20–9	11–5	T–1st	
Appalachian State:		100–70 (.588)	51–31 (.622)		
Georgia Tech Yellow Jackets (Atlantic Coast Conference) (1981–2000)
1981–82	Georgia Tech	10–16	3–11	8th	
1982–83	Georgia Tech	13–15	4–10	6th	
1983–84	Georgia Tech	18–11	6–8	T–5th	NIT First Round
1984–85	Georgia Tech	27–8	9–5	T–1st	NCAA Division I Elite Eight
1985–86	Georgia Tech	27–7	11–3	2nd	NCAA Division I Sweet 16
1986–87	Georgia Tech	16–13	7–7	5th	NCAA Division I First Round
1987–88	Georgia Tech	22–10	8–6	4th	NCAA Division I Second Round
1988–89	Georgia Tech	20–12	8–6	5th	NCAA Division I First Round
1989–90	Georgia Tech	28–7	8–6	T–3rd	NCAA Division I Final Four
1990–91	Georgia Tech	17–13	6–8	T–5th	NCAA Division I Second Round
1991–92	Georgia Tech	23–12	8–8	T–4th	NCAA Division I Sweet 16
1992–93	Georgia Tech	19–11	8–8	6th	NCAA Division I First Round
1993–94	Georgia Tech	16–13	7–9	6th	NIT First Round
1994–95	Georgia Tech	18–12	8–8	5th	
1995–96	Georgia Tech	24–12	13–3	1st	NCAA Division I Sweet 16
1996–97	Georgia Tech	9–18	3–13	9th	
1997–98	Georgia Tech	19–14	6–10	6th	NIT Quarterfinal
1998–99	Georgia Tech	15–16	6–10	T–5th	NIT First Round
1999–00	Georgia Tech	13–17	5–11	8th	
Georgia Tech:		354–237 (.599)	134–150 (.472)		
College of Charleston Cougars (Southern Conference) (2006–2012)
2006–07	College of Charleston	22–11	13–5	2nd (South)	
2007–08	College of Charleston	16–17	9–11	3rd (South)	
2008–09	College of Charleston	27–9	15–5	3rd (South)	CBI Second Round
2009–10	College of Charleston	22–12	14–4	2nd (South)	CBI Second Round
2010–11	College of Charleston	26–11	14–4	1st (South)	NIT Quarterfinal
2011–12	College of Charleston	12–8 *	4–5 *	4th (South)	
College of Charleston:		125–68 (.648)	69–34 (.670)		
Total:		579–375 (.607)			
National champion Postseason invitational champion Conference regular season champion Conference regular season and conference tournament champion Division regular season champion Division regular season and conference tournament champion Conference tournament champion

*= Team record at the time of Cremins' medical leave of absence on January 27, 2012. CofC finished season 19–12 overall with interim head coach Mark Byington being credited with a 7–4 coaching record.

== Personal life ==
With his wife Carolyn, Cremins has one child, Bobby III, who is married to Jennifer, and two grandsons, Risen (Robert Joseph Cremins IV) and Xander (Alexander Charles Cremins). He also has two step-daughters, Liz and Suzie, from Carolyn's earlier marriage. He lives in Hilton Head, South Carolina.

== See also ==
- List of NCAA Division I Men's Final Four appearances by coach
