= 1999–2000 Appalachian State Mountaineers men's basketball team =

American college basketball season

1999–2000 Appalachian State Mountaineers men's basketball

SoCon tournament champions SoCon North champions

NCAA tournament
- Conference: Southern Conference
- North Division
- Record: 23–9 (13–3 SoCon)
- Head coach: Buzz Peterson (4th season)
- Home arena: Varsity Gymnasium

1999–2000 Southern Conference men's basketball standings
	Conf.				Overall
Team	W		L	PCT	W		L	PCT
North
Appalachian State†	13	–	3	.813	23	–	9	.719
Davidson	10	–	6	.625	15	–	13	.536
UNC Greensboro	9	–	7	.563	15	–	13	.536
East Tennessee State	8	–	8	.500	14	–	15	.483
Western Carolina	7	–	9	.438	14	–	14	.500
VMI	1	–	15	.063	6	–	23	.207
South
College of Charleston	13	–	3	.813	24	–	6	.800
Georgia Southern	10	–	6	.625	16	–	12	.571
Wofford	8	–	8	.500	14	–	16	.467
Chattanooga	6	–	10	.375	10	–	19	.345
The Citadel	5	–	10	.333	9	–	20	.310
Furman	5	–	10	.333	14	–	18	.438
† SoCon Tournament winner As of April 30, 2000; Rankings from AP poll

The 1999–2000 Appalachian State Mountaineers men's basketball team represented Appalachian State University in the 1999–2000 NCAA Division I men's basketball season. The Mountaineers, led by fourth-year head coach Buzz Peterson, played their home games for the final season at the Varsity Gymnasium in Boone, North Carolina as members of the Southern Conference. The team finished the season with a record of 23–9 and 13–3 in SoCon play. They won the SoCon tournament to receive an automatic bid to the NCAA tournament. As No. 14 seed in the South region, they lost to No. 3 seed Ohio State in the opening round.

== Roster ==
1999–2000 Appalachian State Mountaineers men's basketball team
Players
Coaches

Pos.	#	Name	Height	Weight	Year	Hometown
G	5	Rufus Leach	6 ft 2 in (1.88 m)	—	Jr
G		Tyson Patterson	5 ft 9 in (1.75 m)	165 lb (75 kg)	Sr	Winston-Salem, North Carolina

Head coach

- Buzz Peterson (North Carolina)

Assistant coach(es)

Legend

- (C) Team captain
- (S) Suspended
- (I) Ineligible
- (W) Walk-on
- Injured
- Current redshirt

Roster

== Schedule and results ==
Date time, TV	Rank^{#}	Opponent^{#}	Result	Record	Site (attendance) city, state
Non-conference Regular season
Nov 19, 1999*		at No. 23 Oklahoma State; America’s Youth Classic	L 75–87	0–1	Gallagher-Iba Arena; Stillwater, Oklahoma
Nov 20, 1999*		vs. Oral Roberts; America’s Youth Classic	L 68–78	0–2	Gallagher-Iba Arena; Stillwater, Oklahoma
Nov 27, 1999*		Lees-McRae	W 117–74	1–2	Varsity Gym; Boone, North Carolina
Nov 29, 1999*		Belmont Abbey	W 104–90	2–2	Varsity Gym; Boone, North Carolina
Dec 3, 1999*		vs. Toledo	W 68–65	3–2	Bradley Center; Milwaukee, Wisconsin
Dec 4, 1999*		at Marquette	L 51–57	3–3	Bradley Center; Milwaukee, Wisconsin
Dec 8, 1999*		East Carolina	W 82–73	4–3	Varsity Gym; Boone, North Carolina
Dec 18, 1999*		at Pittsburgh	L 64–67	4–4	Fitzgerald Field House; Pittsburgh, Pennsylvania
Dec 20, 1999*		at Robert Morris	W 76–64	5–4	Charles L. Sewall Center; Moon Township, Pennsylvania
Dec 23, 1999*		at Green Bay	L 47–64	5–5	Brown County Arena; Ashwaubenon, Wisconsin
Dec 30, 1999*		Tennessee Wesleyan	W 112–48	6–5	Varsity Gym; Boone, North Carolina
Conference Regular season
Jan 3, 2000		at The Citadel	W 82–48	7–5 (1–0)	McAlister Field House; Charleston, South Carolina
Jan 8, 2000		Georgia Southern	W 88–74	8–5 (2–0)	Varsity Gym; Boone, North Carolina
Jan 10, 2000		East Tennessee State	W 85–64	9–5 (3–0)	Varsity Gym; Boone, North Carolina
Jan 15, 2000		at East Tennessee State	W 89–76	10–5 (4–0)	Memorial Center; Johnson City, Tennessee
Jan 17, 2000		VMI	W 97–72	11–5 (5–0)	Varsity Gym; Boone, North Carolina
Jan 19, 2000*		at Clemson	W 72–60	12–5	Littlejohn Coliseum; Clemson, South Carolina
Jan 22, 2000		at Furman	W 73–63	13–5 (6–0)	Timmons Arena; Greenville, South Carolina
Jan 24, 2000		at Western Carolina	W 102–82	14–5 (7–0)	Ramsey Center; Cullowhee, North Carolina
Jan 29, 2000		Chattanooga	W 93–90 ^{OT}	15–5 (8–0)	Varsity Gym; Boone, North Carolina
Jan 31, 2000		at Davidson	W 77–72	16–5 (9–0)	Belk Arena; Davidson, North Carolina
Feb 5, 2000		at College of Charleston	L 64–69	16–6 (9–1)	F. Mitchell Johnson Arena; Charleston, South Carolina
Feb 9, 2000		UNC Greensboro	W 81–66	17–6 (10–1)	Varsity Gym; Boone, North Carolina
Feb 12, 2000		Wofford	W 84–61	18–6 (11–1)	Varsity Gym; Boone, North Carolina
Feb 14, 2000		at VMI	L 69–78	18–7 (11–2)	Cameron Hall; Lexington, Virginia
Feb 19, 2000		at Davidson	L 54–69	18–8 (11–3)	Belk Arena; Davidson, North Carolina
Feb 22, 2000		at UNC Greensboro	W 78–69	19–8 (12–3)	Fleming Gymnasium; Greensboro, North Carolina
Feb 26, 2000		Western Carolina	W 101–83	20–8 (13–3)	Varsity Gym; Boone, North Carolina
SoCon tournament
Mar 3, 2000*		vs. Chattanooga; Quarterfinals	W 88–66	21–8	Timmons Arena; Greenville, South Carolina
Mar 4, 2000*		at Furman; Semifinals	W 60–56	22–8	Timmons Arena; Greenville, South Carolina
Mar 5, 2000*		vs. College of Charleston; Championship game	W 68–56	23–8	Timmons Arena; Greenville, South Carolina
NCAA tournament
Mar 17, 2000*	(14 S)	vs. (3 S) No. 8 Ohio State; First Round	L 61–87	23–9	Gaylord Entertainment Center; Nashville, Tennessee
*Non-conference game. ^{#}Rankings from AP Poll. (#) Tournament seedings in parentheses. S=South. All times are in Eastern.
