= John Pyecha =

American baseball player (born 1931)

- Pitcher
- Born: November 25, 1931 (age 94); Aliquippa, Pennsylvania, U.S.
- Batted: Right Threw: Right

MLB debut
- April 24, 1954, for the Chicago Cubs

Last MLB appearance
- April 24, 1954, for the Chicago Cubs

MLB statistics
- Win–loss record: 0–1
- Earned run average: 10.13
- Innings pitched: 2 2/3
- Stats at Baseball Reference

Teams
- Chicago Cubs (1954)

John Nicholas Pyecha (born November 25, 1931) is an American former professional baseball player. He was a 6 ft 5 in (1.96 m), 200 lb (91 kg) right-handed pitcher who played six seasons (1950–1955) of minor league baseball, but made only one Major League appearance for the 1954 Chicago Cubs.

On April 24, 1954, at Crosley Field, Pyecha entered the game in relief of Warren Hacker in the seventh inning with his Cubs trailing the Cincinnati Redlegs 3–2. Pyecha held the Redlegs off the scoreboard in the seventh and eighth innings; meanwhile, Chicago rallied to take a 5–3 lead thanks to home runs by Ralph Kiner and Hank Sauer. Pyecha started the last half of the ninth inning by issuing a walk to Gus Bell, then retired Jim Greengrass and Ted Kluszewski to get within one out of the victory. But Johnny Temple singled to bring the winning run to the plate, and Wally Post hit a three-run walk-off home run to win the game for the Redlegs. In his lone MLB game, Pyecha allowed three runs, all earned, on four hits and two bases on balls, with two strikeouts, in 2 2/3 innings pitched.

Pyecha spent the remainder of 1954 with the Los Angeles Angels of the Pacific Coast League, and retired after the 1955 season having pitched in 154 minor league games.
