= 1978–79 Appalachian State Mountaineers men's basketball team =

American college basketball season

1978–79 Appalachian State Mountaineers men's basketball

SoCon tournament champions SoCon North champions

NCAA tournament
- Conference: Southern Conference
- North Division
- Record: 23–6 (13–3 SoCon)
- Head coach: Bobby Cremins
- Home arena: Varsity Gymnasium

1978–79 Southern Conference men's basketball standings
	Conf.				Overall
Team	W		L	PCT	W		L	PCT
Appalachian State †	11	–	3	.786	23	–	6	.793
Furman	9	–	3	.750	20	–	9	.690
The Citadel	10	–	4	.714	20	–	7	.741
Western Carolina	5	–	7	.417	14	–	14	.500
Marshall	5	–	8	.385	11	–	16	.407
Davidson	3	–	7	.300	8	–	19	.296
Chattanooga	3	–	8	.273	14	–	13	.519
VMI	2	–	8	.200	12	–	15	.444
† 1979 Southern Conference Tournament winner Rankings from AP poll

The 1978–79 Appalachian State Mountaineers men's basketball team represented Appalachian State University in the 1978–79 NCAA Division I men's basketball season. The Mountaineers, led by fourth-year head coach Bobby Cremins, played their home games for the final season at the Varsity Gymnasium in Boone, North Carolina as members of the Southern Conference. The team finished the season with a record of 23–6 and 13–3 in SoCon play. They won the SoCon tournament to receive an automatic bid to the NCAA tournament. As No. 6 seed in the Mideast region, they lost to No. 3 seed LSU in the second round.

== Roster ==
1978–79 Appalachian State Mountaineers men's basketball team
Players
Coaches

Pos.	#	Name	Height	Weight	Year	Hometown
G		Darryl Robinson	6 ft 4 in (1.93 m)	—	Sr
G		Walter Anderson	5 ft 10 in (1.78 m)	—	Jr
F		Renaldo Lawrence	6 ft 4 in (1.93 m)	—	Sr
C		Mel Hubbard	6 ft 8 in (2.03 m)	—	Sr
C		Charles Payton	6 ft 5 in (1.96 m)	—	Fr

Head coach

- Bobby Cremins (North Carolina)

Assistant coach(es)

Legend

- (C) Team captain
- (S) Suspended
- (I) Ineligible
- (W) Walk-on
- Injured
- Current redshirt

Roster

== Schedule and results ==
Date time, TV	Rank^{#}	Opponent^{#}	Result	Record	Site (attendance) city, state
Non-conference Regular season
Jan 2, 1979*		at No. 9 NC State	L 50–58	5–2	Reynolds Coliseum; Raleigh, North Carolina
Conference Regular season
Feb 24, 1979		VMI	W 73–63	21–5 (11–3)	Varsity Gym; Boone, North Carolina
SoCon tournament
Mar 3, 1979*		vs. Western Carolina; Semifinals	W 65–43	22–5	Roanoke Civic Center; Roanoke, Virginia
Mar 4, 1979*		vs. Furman; Championship game	W 86–83	23–5	Roanoke Civic Center; Roanoke, Virginia
NCAA tournament
Mar 10, 1979*		vs. No. 9 Louisiana State	L 57–71	23–6	Assembly Hall; Bloomington, Indiana
*Non-conference game. ^{#}Rankings from AP Poll. (#) Tournament seedings in parentheses. ME=Mideast. All times are in Eastern.
