= 2009–10 Appalachian State Mountaineers men's basketball team =

American college basketball season

2009–10 Appalachian State Mountaineers men's basketball

Southern Conference North Division Champions

CIT, Semifinals
- Conference: Southern Conference
- North Division
- Record: 24–13 (13–5 SoCon)
- Head coach: Buzz Peterson (1st/5th season)
- Associate head coach: Jamie Kachmarik (1st season)
- Assistant coaches: Matt McMahon (10th season); Jason Capel (1st season)
- Home arena: George M. Holmes Convocation Center

2009–10 Southern Conference men's basketball standings
	Conf.				Overall
Team	W		L	PCT	W		L	PCT
North
Appalachian State	13	–	5	.722	24	–	12	.667
Western Carolina	11	–	7	.611	22	–	12	.647
Chattanooga	6	–	12	.333	15	–	18	.455
UNC Greensboro	6	–	12	.333	8	–	23	.258
Samford	5	–	13	.278	11	–	20	.355
Elon	5	–	13	.278	9	–	23	.281
South
Wofford†	15	–	3	.833	26	–	9	.743
College of Charleston	14	–	4	.778	22	–	12	.647
Davidson	11	–	7	.611	16	–	15	.516
The Citadel	9	–	9	.500	16	–	16	.500
Furman	7	–	11	.389	13	–	17	.433
Georgia Southern	6	–	12	.333	9	–	23	.281
† SoCon Tournament winner As of March 22, 2010; Rankings from AP Poll

The 2009–10 Appalachian State Mountaineers men's basketball team represented Appalachian State University in the 2009–10 NCAA Division I men's basketball season. The Mountaineers were led by head coach Buzz Peterson in his first year leading the team in his second stint as Appalachian State's head coach after returning to the team in April of 2009. Appalachian State played their home games at the George M. Holmes Convocation Center in Boone, North Carolina, as members of the Southern Conference.

The Mountaineers finished conference play with a 13–5 record and won the Southern Conference's North division. In the SoCon tournament, Appalachian State won two games to advance to the SoCon championship game, where they were defeated by South division champion Wofford.

Appalachian State failed to qualify for the NCAA tournament, but were invited to the 2010 CollegeInsider.com Postseason Tournament. The Mountaineers won their first two games in the CIT to advance to the tournament's semifinals, where they were eliminated by Pacific, 64–56.

The Mountaineers finished the season with a 24–13 record.

== Roster ==
2009–10 Appalachian State Mountaineers men's basketball team
Players
Coaches

Pos.	#	Name	Height	Weight	Year	Hometown
G	0	Donald Sims	6 ft 1 in (1.85 m)	170 lb (77 kg)	Jr	Gaffney, South Carolina
G	1	Ryann Abraham	5 ft 10 in (1.78 m)	185 lb (84 kg)	Sr	Mayagüez, Puerto Rico
F	11	Nathan Healy	6 ft 7 in (2.01 m)	210 lb (95 kg)	Fr	New Bern, North Carolina
G	12	Marcus Wright	6 ft 1 in (1.85 m)	190 lb (86 kg)	So	Winston-Salem, North Carolina
G	15	Jeremi Booth	6 ft 5 in (1.96 m)	205 lb (93 kg)	Jr	Altavista, Virginia
F	21	Omar Carter	6 ft 5 in (1.96 m)	220 lb (100 kg)	Jr	Charlotte, North Carolina
G	23	Kellen Brand	6 ft 1 in (1.85 m)	185 lb (84 kg)	Sr	High Point, North Carolina
G	24	J. R. Archer	6 ft 3 in (1.91 m)	205 lb (93 kg)	Jr	Boone, North Carolina
F	25	Josh Hunter	6 ft 6 in (1.98 m)	245 lb (111 kg)	Sr	Albany, Georgia
G	31	A. J. Highsmith	6 ft 4 in (1.93 m)	205 lb (93 kg)	Sr	Winston-Salem, North Carolina
C	32	Isaac Butts	6 ft 10 in (2.08 m)	285 lb (129 kg)	Jr	Milledgeville, Georgia
F	33	Tyler Webb	6 ft 9 in (2.06 m)	230 lb (104 kg)	Sr	Nickelsville, Virginia
C	34	Josh Nirenberg	6 ft 9 in (2.06 m)	265 lb (120 kg)	RS Fr	Fort Lauderdale, Florida
G	41	Ryan Kilmartin	6 ft 4 in (1.93 m)	190 lb (86 kg)	Fr	Charlotte, North Carolina
F	45	Anthony Breeze	6 ft 5 in (1.96 m)	230 lb (104 kg)	Jr	Greenville, South Carolina
F	50	Andre Williamson	6 ft 7 in (2.01 m)	225 lb (102 kg)	So	Dayton, Ohio

Head coach

- Buzz Peterson (North Carolina)

Assistant coach(es)

- Jason Capel (North Carolina)
- Jamie Kachmarik (Bowling Green)
- Matt McMahon (Appalachian State)

Legend

- (C) Team captain
- (S) Suspended
- (I) Ineligible
- (W) Walk-on
- Injured
- Current redshirt

Roster
Last update: February 20, 2023

== Schedule and results ==
Date time, TV	Rank^{#}	Opponent^{#}	Result	Record	Site (attendance) city, state
Exhibition
November 6, 2009*; 7:30 pm		Mars Hill	W 94–81	—	Holmes Convocation Center; Boone, NC
Regular season
November 13, 2009*; 7:00 pm		UNC Wilmington	W 79–68	1–0	Holmes Convocation Center (2,544); Boone, NC
November 14, 2009*; 4:00 pm		at East Tennessee State	L 58–62	1–1	Memorial Center (5,562); Johnson City, TN
November 17, 2009*; 7:00 pm		Lees–McRae	W 77–44	2–1	Holmes Convocation Center (1,621); Boone, NC
November 20, 2009*; 8:00 pm		at Arkansas	L 72–81 ^{OT}	2–2	Bud Walton Arena (11,958); Fayetteville, AR
November 23, 2009*; 7:00 pm		at No. 16 Louisville	L 53–80	2–3	Freedom Hall (19,027); Louisville, KY
November 28, 2009*; 7:00 pm		Morgan State	W 93–92 ^{OT}	3–3	Holmes Convocation Center (1,576); Boone, NC
November 30, 2009*; 7:00 pm		Winthrop	W 70–51	4–3	Holmes Convocation Center (1,292); Boone, NC
December 3, 2009; 7:00 pm		Furman	L 82–85	4–4 (0–1)	Holmes Convocation Center (1,851); Boone, NC
December 7, 2009; 7:00 pm		at Wofford	W 77–76	5–4 (1–1)	Benjamin Johnson Arena (1,316); Spartanburg, SC
December 17, 2009*; 7:30 pm		Milligan	W 113–91	6–4	Holmes Convocation Center (1,002); Boone, NC
December 19, 2009*; 7:00 pm		at Robert Morris	W 65–52	7–4	Charles L. Sewall Center (837); Moon Township, PA
December 21, 2009*; 8:00 pm		at Dayton	L 49–65	7–5	UD Arena (13,435); Dayton, OH
December 30, 2009*; 8:00 pm		at Campbell	L 63–92	7–6	John W. Pope Jr. Convocation Center (1,886); Buies Creek, NC
January 6, 2010; 7:30 pm		The Citadel	L 58–62	7–7 (1–2)	Holmes Convocation Center (1,037); Boone, NC
January 9, 2010; 2:00 pm		at Davidson	W 78–68	8–7 (2–2)	John M. Belk Arena (5,109); Davidson, NC
January 13, 2010; 7:00 pm		Elon	W 89–65	9–7 (3–2)	Holmes Convocation Center (2,301); Boone, NC
January 16, 2010; 3:00 pm		UNC Greensboro	W 72–64	10–7 (4–2)	Holmes Convocation Center (2,162); Boone, NC
January 20, 2010; 7:00 pm		at Georgia Southern	L 65–68	10–8 (4–3)	Hanner Fieldhouse (2,036); Statesboro, GA
January 23, 2010; 3:30 pm		Western Carolina	W 87–74	11–8 (5–3)	Holmes Convocation Center (5,074); Boone, NC
January 28, 2010; 8:00 pm		at Samford	W 68–55	12–8 (6–3)	Pete Hanna Center (2,133); Birmingham, AL
January 30, 2010; 7:30 pm		at Chattanooga	L 80–85	12–9 (6–4)	McKenzie Arena (4,331); Chattanooga, TN
February 1, 2010*; 7:00 pm		King	L 76–87	12–10	Holmes Convocation Center (1,807); Boone, NC
February 6, 2010; 3:00 pm		at Western Carolina	W 89–77	13–10 (7–4)	Ramsey Center (6,024); Cullowhee, NC
February 8, 2010; 7:00 pm		at UNC Greensboro	W 75–69	14–10 (8–4)	Greensboro Coliseum (4,198); Greensboro, NC
February 11, 2010; 7:00 pm		Davidson	W 66–56	15–10 (9–4)	Holmes Convocation Center (2,007); Boone, NC
February 13, 2010; 7:00 pm		Georgia Southern	W 111–83	16–10 (10–4)	Holmes Convocation Center (1,482); Boone, NC
February 17, 2010; 9:00 pm		at College of Charleston	L 72–73	16–11 (10–5)	Carolina First Arena (5,122); Charleston, SC
February 20, 2010*; 7:00 pm		Tennessee Tech; ESPN BracketBusters	W 81–68	17–11	Holmes Convocation Center (2,226); Boone, NC
February 22, 2010; 7:00 pm		at Elon	W 58–54	18–11 (11–5)	Alumni Gym (914); Elon, NC
February 25, 2010; 7:30 pm		Chattanooga	W 80–74	19–11 (12–5)	Holmes Convocation Center (2,003); Boone, NC
February 27, 2010; 3:00 pm		Samford	W 82–68	20–11 (13–5)	Holmes Convocation Center (2,120); Boone, NC
SoCon tournament
March 6, 2010; 7:00 pm	(N1)	vs. (S4) The Citadel; SoCon Quarterfinals	W 71–61	21–11	Bojangles Coliseum; Charlotte, NC
March 7, 2010; 8:30 pm	(N1)	vs. (S2) College of Charleston; SoCon Semifinals	W 77–54	22–11	Time Warner Cable Arena (5,440); Charlotte, NC
March 8, 2010; 9:00 pm	(N1)	vs. (S1) Wofford; SoCon Championship Game	L 51–56	22–12	Time Warner Cable Arena (6,193); Charlotte, NC
CollegeInsider.com tournament
March 16, 2010; 7:00 pm		Harvard; CIT First Round	W 93–71	23–12	Holmes Convocation Center (1,786); Boone, NC
March 22, 2010; 7:00 pm		at Marshall; CIT Quarterfinals	W 80–72	24–12	Cam Henderson Center (4,371); Huntington, WV
March 25, 2010; 8:00 pm		Pacific; CIT Semifinals	L 56–64	24–13	Holmes Convocation Center (2,565); Boone, NC
*Non-conference game. ^{#}Rankings from AP Poll. (#) Tournament seedings in parentheses. All times are in Eastern Time. Source
