= Charles Alfred Payton =

British adventurer and diplomat (1843–1926)

Sir Charles Alfred Payton MVO (12 November 1843 – 11 March 1926) was a British adventurer, fisherman, diplomat and writer.

== Career ==
Charles Payton was born in York, the son of a Dissenting minister, and educated at Scarborough and at New College, London, which was not yet part of the University of London, but in 1860 he passed the university's matriculation with honours. He became an insurance clerk and then a railway clerk, and in 1864 he prospected for gold in California but was unsuccessful. Afterwards he became by turn a manufacturer of explosives, the owner of a Cornish china clay mine, a diamond digger at Kimberley, South Africa, a salesman on the Continent for a firm of coal merchants, a clerk at Toulouse, and a merchant at Mogador in western Morocco.

He was appointed British Consul at Mogador in 1880 and in 1890 his jurisdiction was expanded to the whole of southern Morocco (another consul was based at Tangier).

In February 1893 he was transferred to be consul at Genoa, Italy and in September of that year joined with other British residents to found the Genoa Cricket & Athletic Club, now the Genoa Cricket and Football Club with a prominent professional football team.

In 1897 Payton was transferred to Calais in northern France to be consul for the departments of the Nord (except for Dunkirk where there was another consul), Pas-de-Calais, and Somme. He remained there for the rest of his career; in 1906 he was appointed MVO, in 1902 his territory was expanded to include the departments of Aisne and Ardennes, and in 1911 he was promoted to Consul-General. He retired in 1913 and was knighted in the New Year Honours of 1914. He died at Scarborough in 1926.

== Publications ==
- The diamond diggings of South Africa: a personal and practical account, Horace Cox, London, 1872
- Moss from a rolling stone, or, Moorish wanderings and rambling reminiscences, "The Field" Office, London, 1879
- The Rod on the Rivieras, in Sport on the Rivieras, with chapters on river and sea fishing in the south of Europe by C.A. Payton by Eustace Reynolds-Ball & Charles Payton, Reynolds-Balls Guides, London, 1911
- Days of a knight: an octogenarian's medley of memories (life, travel, sport, adventure), Hutchinson, London, 1924

Charles Payton was angling correspondent of The Field from 1867 to 1914, under the pen-name of "Sarcelle". He also contributed fiction to London Society magazine.
