= D. J. Thompson =

American professional basketball player (born 1985)

Free agent
- Position: Point guard

Personal information
- Born: May 2, 1985 (age 41) Raleigh, North Carolina, U.S.
- Listed height: 1.73 m (5 ft 8 in)
- Listed weight: 77 kg (170 lb)

Career information
- High school: Leesville Road (Raleigh, North Carolina)
- College: Appalachian State (2003–2007)
- NBA draft: 2007: undrafted
- Playing career: 2007–present

Career history
- 2007–2008: AZS Koszalin
- 2008–2009: AEK Athens
- 2009–2010: Antalya BB
- 2010–2011: Anwil Wloclawek
- 2011–2012: Ilysiakos
- 2012–2013: STB Le Havre
- 2013–2014: Best Balıkesir
- 2014–2015: Tüyap Büyükçekmece
- 2015–2016: Best Balıkesir

D.J. Thompson (born May 2, 1985) is an American professional basketball player. He is 1.74 m (5 ft 8 ½ in) in height and he plays the point guard position. He last played for Best Balıkesir of the Turkish Basketball Second League.

== Amateur career ==
Thompson played his high school basketball in Raleigh, North Carolina at Leesville Road High School and he played collegiality at Appalachian State University, where he had career averages of 13.0 points per game, 4.1 assists per game and 2.8 rebounds per game. In his senior year of college, he averaged 15.6 points per game, 4.9 assists per game and 3.3 rebounds per game. He led the Mountaineers to a 25–8 record, to the Southern Conference North Division title, and to a National Invitation Tournament (NIT) bid. During his senior year his team managed to get wins over Davidson College, Wichita State University, the University of Virginia, Virginia Commonwealth University and Vanderbilt University.
