= Charles Payton (basketball) =

American-Austrian basketball player

Personal information
- Born: 1960 (age 65–66) Camden, New Jersey, U.S.
- Listed height: 6 ft 5 in (1.96 m)
- Listed weight: 185 lb (84 kg)

Career information
- High school: Camden (Camden, New Jersey)
- College: Appalachian State (1978–1982)
- NBA draft: 1982: undrafted
- Position: Forward

Career highlights
- SoCon Player of the Year (1981); 2× First Team All-SoCon (1981, 1982); Second Team All-SoCon (1980); SoCon All-Freshmen Team (1979)

Charles Payton (born 1960) is an American-Austrian former professional basketball player. He was born in the United States, but after spending the majority of his professional career in Austria he acquired dual citizenship. He now lives in Vienna and coaches basketball.

== Playing career ==
Payton did not begin playing basketball until his junior year at Camden High School in Camden, New Jersey. He had been a football player until then, but a football injury the previous year ended his pursuit of that sport. Then-head basketball coach Clarence Turner spotted Payton in the marching band, and upon seeing his size, recruited him to play forward for the team. In his senior season, Camden won the New Jersey Group IV state championship.

Payton's athleticism allowed him to progress quickly, and just three years after first playing organized basketball he found himself suiting up as a freshman for Appalachian State University, an NCAA Division I school located in Boone, North Carolina. He earned himself a spot on the Southern Conference (SoCon) All-Freshman Team after helping the Mountaineers win the conference championship and qualify for an NCAA tournament berth.

Over Payton's final three seasons he earned all-conference honors in each of them: Second Team All-SoCon as a sophomore, then back-to-back First Teams in his junior and senior years. In Payton's junior season of 1980–81, he led the league in points (17.1) and rebounds (10.7) per game as well as field goal percentage (63.3%). Appalachian State would also tie for first place in Payton's junior season, but because the Mountaineers did not win the SoCon tournament, they did not earn a postseason bid. For his outstanding season he was named the SoCon Player of the Year.

After his collegiate career ended following the 1981–82 season, Payton played professionally in Portugal and England before moving to Austria. He spent the majority of his international career in the country.

== Personal life ==
Charles Payton's son, Kevin Payton, played basketball at the University of Minnesota from 2004 to 2008. The Payton family are residents of Vienna, Austria.
