= 2009–10 Wake Forest Demon Deacons men's basketball team =

American college basketball season

2009–10 Wake Forest Demon Deacons men's basketball

NCAA tournament, Round of 32
- Conference: Atlantic Coast Conference
- Record: 20–11 (9–7 ACC)
- Head coach: Dino Gaudio
- Assistant coaches: Jeff Battle; Dave Wojcik; Rusty LaRue
- Home arena: LJVM Coliseum

2009–10 ACC men's basketball standings
	Conf.				Overall
Team	W		L	PCT	W		L	PCT
No. 3 Duke †	13	–	3	.813	35	–	5	.875
No. 20 Maryland	13	–	3	.813	24	–	9	.727
Florida State	10	–	6	.625	22	–	10	.688
Virginia Tech	10	–	6	.625	25	–	9	.735
Wake Forest	9	–	7	.563	20	–	10	.667
Clemson	9	–	7	.563	21	–	11	.656
Georgia Tech	7	–	9	.438	23	–	13	.639
Boston College	6	–	10	.375	15	–	16	.484
Virginia	5	–	11	.313	15	–	16	.484
North Carolina	5	–	11	.313	20	–	17	.541
NC State	5	–	11	.313	20	–	16	.556
Miami (FL)	4	–	12	.250	20	–	13	.606
† 2010 ACC tournament winner As of March 19, 2010; Rankings from AP Poll

The 2009–10 Wake Forest Demon Deacons men's basketball team represented Wake Forest University. The team's head coach was Dino Gaudio. The team played its home games at Lawrence Joel Veterans Memorial Coliseum in Winston-Salem, North Carolina, and is a member of the Atlantic Coast Conference. They finished the season 20–11, 9–7 in ACC play and lost in the first round of the 2010 ACC men's basketball tournament. They received an at–large bid to the 2010 NCAA Division I men's basketball tournament, earning a 9 seed in the East Region. They defeated 8 seed Texas in overtime in the first round before losing to 1 seed and AP #2 Kentucky in the second round.

== Roster ==
2009–10 Wake Forest Demon Deacons men's basketball team
Players
Coaches

Pos.	#	Name	Height	Weight	Year	Previous school	Hometown
F	1	Al-Farouq Aminu	6 ft 9 in (2.06 m)	215 lb (98 kg)	So	Norcross High School	Norcross, Georgia
G	30	Phaethon Bolton	5 ft 8 in (1.73 m)	155 lb (70 kg)	Sr	Brunswick School (Connecticut)	Greenwich, Connecticut
G	2	Gary Clark	6 ft 4 in (1.93 m)	195 lb (88 kg)	Jr	Montverde Academy	Sarasota, Florida
G	35	Kyle Fowler	6 ft 2 in (1.88 m)	175 lb (79 kg)	Sr	Wheaton North High School	Wheaton, Illinois
F	41	Brooks Godwin	6 ft 5 in (1.96 m)	200 lb (91 kg)	So	Mount Tabor High School	Winston-Salem, North Carolina
G	11	C. J. Harris	6 ft 2 in (1.88 m)	175 lb (79 kg)	Fr	Mount Tabor High School	Winston-Salem, North Carolina
G	43	Aaron Ingle	6 ft 0 in (1.83 m)	175 lb (79 kg)	So	Christ School	Weaverville, North Carolina
F	45	Ryan Keenan	6 ft 4 in (1.93 m)	195 lb (88 kg)	So	Westbury Christian School	Bellaire, Texas
F	52	Denmore McDermott	6 ft 5 in (1.96 m)	235 lb (107 kg)	Jr	St. Paul's School for Boys	Baltimore, Maryland
C	13	Chas McFarland	7 ft 0 in (2.13 m)	245 lb (111 kg)	Sr	Worcester Academy	Lovington, Illinois
F	25	Nikita Mescheriakov (I)	6 ft 7 in (2.01 m)	215 lb (98 kg)	RS So	St. John's Prospect Hall	Minsk, Belarus
G	10	Ish Smith	6 ft 0 in (1.83 m)	175 lb (79 kg)	Sr	Central Cabarrus High School	Concord, North Carolina
F	20	Ari Stewart	6 ft 7 in (2.01 m)	205 lb (93 kg)	Fr	Joseph Wheeler High School	Marietta, Georgia
C	40	Ty Walker	7 ft 0 in (2.13 m)	220 lb (100 kg)	So	New Hanover High School	Wilmington, North Carolina
F/C	44	David Weaver	6 ft 11 in (2.11 m)	250 lb (113 kg)	RS Sr	Charles D. Owen High School	Black Mountain, North Carolina
G	42	L. D. Williams	6 ft 4 in (1.93 m)	210 lb (95 kg)	Sr	Montverde Academy	Yadkinville, North Carolina
C	55	Tony Woods	6 ft 11 in (2.11 m)	245 lb (111 kg)	So	Rome High School	Rome, Georgia

Head coach

- Dino Gaudio (Ohio)

Assistant coach(es)

- Jeff Battle (Marshall)
- Dave Wojcik (Loyola (MD))
- Rusty LaRue (Wake Forest)

Legend

- (C) Team captain
- (S) Suspended
- (I) Ineligible
- (W) Walk-on
- Injured
- Current redshirt

Roster
Last update: 2010-03-24

== Schedule ==
Date time, TV	Rank^{#}	Opponent^{#}	Result	Record	Site city, state
Regular season
November 13*; 7:30 p.m.		Oral Roberts	W 76–56	1–0	LJVM Coliseum; Winston-Salem, NC
November 15*; 2:00 p.m., MASN		vs. East Carolina	W 89–58	2–0	Greensboro Coliseum; Greensboro, NC
November 18*; 7:30 p.m.		High Point	W 83–60	3–0	LJVM Coliseum; Winston-Salem, NC
November 24*; 7:30 p.m.		Winston-Salem State	W 76–52	4–0	LJVM Coliseum; Winston-Salem, NC
November 28*; 2:00 p.m.		William & Mary	L 68–78	4–1	LJVM Coliseum; Winston-Salem, NC
December 1*; 7:00 p.m., ESPN		at No. 4 Purdue; 2009 ACC – Big Ten Challenge	L 58–69	4–2	Mackey Arena; West Lafayette, IN
December 5*; 5:30 p.m., ESPN2		at No. 17 Gonzaga	W 77–75	5–2	McCarthey Athletic Center; Spokane, WA
December 13*; 2:00 p.m.		Elon	W 90–50	6–2	LJVM Coliseum; Winston-Salem, NC
December 16*; 7:00 p.m., ESPNU		at UNC Wilmington	W 80–69	7–2	Trask Coliseum; Wilmington, NC
December 20; 7:45 p.m., FSN		North Carolina State	W 67–59	8–2 (1–0)	LJVM Coliseum; Winston-Salem, NC
December 28*; 7:00 p.m.		at UNC Greensboro	W 75–60	9–2 (1–0)	Greensboro Coliseum; Greensboro, NC
December 31*; 7:30 p.m., ESPNU		Richmond	W 74–68 ^{OT}	10–2 (1–0)	LJVM Coliseum; Winston-Salem, NC
January 3*; 5:30 p.m., FSN		Xavier	W 96–92 ^{2OT}	11–2 (1–0)	LJVM Coliseum; Winston-Salem, NC
January 9; 6:00 p.m., ESPNU		at Miami	L 66–67	11–3 (1–1)	BankUnited Center; Coral Gables, FL
January 12; 9:00 p.m., Raycom		Maryland	W 85–83 ^{OT}	12–3 (2–1)	LJVM Coliseum; Winston-Salem, NC
January 17; 8:00 p.m., FSN		at No. 7 Duke	L 70–90	12–4 (2–2)	Cameron Indoor Stadium; Durham, NC
January 20; 7:00 p.m., ESPN		at North Carolina	W 82-69	13–4 (3–2)	Dean Smith Center; Chapel Hill, NC
January 23; 4:00 p.m., Raycom		Virginia	W 69–57	14–4 (4–2)	LJVM Coliseum; Winston-Salem, NC
January 28; 7:00 p.m., RSN		at No. 22 Georgia Tech	L 58–79	14–5 (4–3)	Alexander Memorial Coliseum; Atlanta, GA
February 2; 7:00 p.m., ESPN2		Miami	W 62–53	15–5 (5–3)	LJVM Coliseum; Winston-Salem, NC
February 6; 12:00 p.m., Raycom		at Virginia	W 64–61 ^{OT}	16–5 (6–3)	John Paul Jones Arena; Charlottesville, VA
February 9; 7:00 p.m., RSN		Boston College	W 92–85	17–5 (7–3)	LJVM Coliseum; Winston-Salem, NC
February 13; 8:00 p.m., Raycom		No. 20 Georgia Tech	W 75–64	18–5 (8–3)	LJVM Coliseum; Winston-Salem, NC
February 16; 7:00 p.m., ESPN2	No. 25	at Virginia Tech	L 83–87	18–6 (8–4)	Cassell Coliseum; Blacksburg, VA
February 20; 2:00 p.m., Raycom	No. 25	at North Carolina State	L 54–68	18–7 (8–5)	RBC Center; Raleigh, NC
February 27; 2:00 p.m., CBS		North Carolina	L 68–77	18–8 (8–6)	LJVM Coliseum; Winston-Salem, NC
March 3; 7:00 p.m., ESPN2		at Florida State	L 47–51	18–9 (8–7)	Donald L. Tucker Center; Tallahassee, FL
March 7; 6:00 p.m., FSN		Clemson	W 70–65	19–9 (9–7)	LJVM Coliseum; Winston-Salem, NC
ACC tournament
March 11; 2:00 p.m., Raycom		vs. Miami; First Round	L 62–83	19–10	Greensboro Coliseum; Greensboro, NC
NCAA tournament
March 18*; 9:35 p.m., CBS		vs. Texas; First Round	W 81–80 ^{OT}	20–10	New Orleans Arena; New Orleans, LA
March 20*; 8:15 p.m., CBS		vs. No. 2 Kentucky; Second Round	L 60–90	20–11	New Orleans Arena; New Orleans, LA
*Non-conference game. ^{#}Rankings from Coaches' Poll. (#) Tournament seedings in parentheses. All times are in Eastern Time.

== Leading scorer by game ==
Game	Player
Oral Roberts	Aminu (25)
East Carolina	Aminu (23)
High Point	Aminu (22)
Winston-Salem State	Harris/Smith (16)
William & Mary	Harris (17)
Purdue	Harris/Smith (14)
Gonzaga	Harris (19)
Elon	Stewart (16)
UNC-Wilmington	Williams (23)
NC State	Aminu (18)
UNC-Greensboro	Aminu (23)
Richmond	Aminu (16)
Xavier	Smith (26)
Miami	Williams (17)
Maryland	Aminu (24)
Duke	Aminu (22)
North Carolina	Harris/Smith (20)
Virginia	Smith (21)
Georgia Tech	Aminu (15)
Miami	Harris (12)
Virginia	Smith (15)
Boston College	Aminu (22)
Georgia Tech	Aminu (19)
Virginia Tech	Aminu (25)
NC State	Aminu (15)
North Carolina	Stewart (16)
Florida State	Smith (14)
Clemson	Aminu (18)
Miami	Smith (14)
Texas	Aminu (20)
Kentucky	Aminu (16)

== Rankings ==
Poll	Preseason	Week 1	Week 2	Week 3	Week 4	Week 5	Week 6	Week 7	Week 8	Week 9	Week 10	Week 11	Week 12	Week 13	Week 14	Week 15	Week 16	Week 17	Week 18	Final
AP	RV (35)	RV (31)	RV (36)	--	--	RV (50)	RV (47)	RV (40)	RV (36)	RV (37)	RV (36)	RV (29)	RV (29)	RV (28)	23	RV (37)	--	--	--	--
Coaches	RV (43)	RV (39)	RV (27)	--	RV (38)	RV (36)	RV (34)	RV (41)	RV (30)	RV (35)	--	RV (30)	--	RV (36)	25	--	--	--	--	--
