= 2009–10 Atlantic Coast Conference men's basketball season =

2009–10 ACC men's basketball standings
	Conf.				Overall
Team	W		L	PCT	W		L	PCT
No. 3 Duke †	13	–	3	.813	35	–	5	.875
No. 20 Maryland	13	–	3	.813	24	–	9	.727
Florida State	10	–	6	.625	22	–	10	.688
Virginia Tech	10	–	6	.625	25	–	9	.735
Wake Forest	9	–	7	.563	20	–	10	.667
Clemson	9	–	7	.563	21	–	11	.656
Georgia Tech	7	–	9	.438	23	–	13	.639
Boston College	6	–	10	.375	15	–	16	.484
Virginia	5	–	11	.313	15	–	16	.484
North Carolina	5	–	11	.313	20	–	17	.541
NC State	5	–	11	.313	20	–	16	.556
Miami (FL)	4	–	12	.250	20	–	13	.606
† 2010 ACC tournament winner As of March 19, 2010; Rankings from AP Poll

The 2009–10 Atlantic Coast Conference men's basketball season was the 57th season for the league.

Duke and Maryland shared the regular season crown, while Duke won the ACC Tournament championship.

The 2010 Atlantic Coast Conference men's basketball tournament, a part of the 2009-10 NCAA Division I men's basketball season, took place from March 11–14, 2010, at the Greensboro Coliseum in Greensboro, North Carolina. The championship game matched Duke against Georgia Tech. Duke won 65–61, winning its 9th ACC championship in 12 years, and the most titles in ACC history at 18. As conference champion, Duke received the ACC's automatic bid to the 2010 NCAA Tournament. Other teams to go to the tournament were Maryland, Wake Forest, Georgia Tech, Florida State, and Clemson. North Carolina made the NIT post season tournament final, but lost there to Dayton. In the Big Ten- ACC Challenge, this was the first year the ACC lost, losing 6–5 overall.
