= 2009–10 Virginia Tech Hokies men's basketball team =

American college basketball season

2009–10 Virginia Tech Hokies men's basketball

NIT, Quarterfinals
- Conference: Atlantic Coast Conference
- Record: 25–9 (10–6 ACC)
- Head coach: Seth Greenberg
- Assistant coaches: James Johnson; Ryan Odom; Bill Courtney
- Home arena: Cassell Coliseum

2009–10 ACC men's basketball standings
	Conf.				Overall
Team	W		L	PCT	W		L	PCT
No. 3 Duke †	13	–	3	.813	35	–	5	.875
No. 20 Maryland	13	–	3	.813	24	–	9	.727
Florida State	10	–	6	.625	22	–	10	.688
Virginia Tech	10	–	6	.625	25	–	9	.735
Wake Forest	9	–	7	.563	20	–	10	.667
Clemson	9	–	7	.563	21	–	11	.656
Georgia Tech	7	–	9	.438	23	–	13	.639
Boston College	6	–	10	.375	15	–	16	.484
Virginia	5	–	11	.313	15	–	16	.484
North Carolina	5	–	11	.313	20	–	17	.541
NC State	5	–	11	.313	20	–	16	.556
Miami (FL)	4	–	12	.250	20	–	13	.606
† 2010 ACC tournament winner As of March 19, 2010; Rankings from AP Poll

The 2009–10 Virginia Tech Hokies men's basketball team represented the Virginia Tech in the 2009–10 NCAA Division I men's basketball season. The Hokies were coached by Seth Greenberg and played their home games at Cassell Coliseum in Blacksburg, Virginia. The Hokies are a members of the Atlantic Coast Conference. They finished the season 25–9, 10–6 in ACC play and lost in the quarterfinals of the 2010 ACC men's basketball tournament. They were invited to the 2010 National Invitation Tournament where they advanced to the quarterfinals before falling to Rhode Island.

== Roster ==
#	Name	Height	Weight (lbs.)	Position	Class	Hometown	Previous Team(s)
0	Jeff Allen	6'7"	230	F	Jr.	Washington, D.C., U.S.	Hargrave Military Academy
1	Terrell Bell	6'6"	205	G/F	Jr.	Stone Mountain, GA, U.S.	Stone Mountain HS
3	Allen Chaney	6'9"	235	F	So.	Baltimore, MD, U.S.	New London HS; Florida
4	Cadarian Raines	6'9"	238	F	Fr.	Petersburg, VA, U.S.	Petersburg HS
5	Dorenzo Hudson	6'5"	220	G	Jr.	Charlotte, NC, U.S.	Hargrave Military Academy
11	Erick Green	6'4"	185	G	Fr.	Winchester, VA, U.S.	Paul VI HS
14	Victor Davila	6'8"	245	F	So.	Canóvanas, PR, Puerto Rico	Starmount HS
21	Lewis Witcher	6'9"	218	F	Sr.	Rocky Mount, VA, U.S.	Franklin County HS
23	Malcolm Delaney	6'3"	190	G	Jr.	Baltimore, MD, U.S.	Towson Catholic HS
24	Ben Boggs	6'4"	200	G	Fr.	Roanoke, VA, U.S.	Hidden Valley HS
25	Manny Atkins	6'7"	200	G F	Fr.	Stone Mountain, GA, U.S.	Tucker HS
32	Paul Debnam	6'3"	195	G	Sr.	Farmville, VA, U.S.	Prince Edward HS
33	J. T. Thompson	6'6"	210	F	Jr.	Monroe, NC, U.S.	Hope Christian Academy
42	Gene Swindle	6'11"	260	C	Jr.	Miami, FL, U.S.	Gulliver Prep

== 2009-10 Schedule and results ==
- All times are Eastern

Date time, TV	Rank^{#}	Opponent^{#}	Result	Record	Site (attendance) city, state
Regular season
11/15/2009*; 4:00pm		Brown; Philly Hoop Group Classic	W 69–55	1–0	Cassell Coliseum (9,693); Blacksburg, VA
11/17/2009*; 7:00pm		UNC Greensboro	W 59–46	2–0	Cassell Coliseum (9,693); Blacksburg, VA
11/23/2009*; 7:00pm		at Campbell	W 71–60	3–0	John W. Pope, Jr. Convocation Center (3,205); Buies Creek, NC
11/27/2009*; 8:00pm, Comcast SportsNet		vs. Temple; Philly Hoop Group Classic	L 61–50	3–1	The Palestra (3,750); Philadelphia, PA
11/28/2009*; 6:15pm		vs. Delaware; Philly Hoop Group Classic	W 74–66 ^{OT}	4–1	The Palestra (NA); Philadelphia, PA
12/1/2009*; 8:35pm, ESPN2		at Iowa; ACC – Big Ten Challenge	W 70–64	5–1	Carver-Hawkeye Arena (8,755); Iowa City, IA
12/6/2009*; 3:30pm		Georgia; Maroon Monsoon	W 74–68	6–1	Cassell Coliseum (9,778); Blacksburg, VA
12/9/2009*; 7:40pm		Virginia Military Institute	W 98–73	7–1	Cassell Coliseum (9,758); Blacksburg, VA
12/12/2009*; 7:00pm, ESPN2		at Penn State	W 66–64	8–1	Bryce Jordan Center (11,237); State College, PA
12/19/2009*; 7:00pm		Charleston Southern	W 73–50	9–1	Cassell Coliseum (9,774); Blacksburg, VA
12/22/2009*; 7:00pm		UMBC	W 71–34	10–1	Cassell Coliseum (9,807); Blacksburg, VA
12/30/2010*; 2:00pm		Longwood	W 85–50	11–1	Cassell Coliseum (9,836); Blacksburg, VA
1/2/2010*; 6:30pm, ESPN2		vs. Seton Hall; Cancun Governor's Cup	W 103–94	12–1	Poliforum Benito Juarez (2,365); Cancun, Mexico
1/10/2010; 7:45pm, FSN		at No. 9 North Carolina	L 78–64	12–2 (0–1)	Dean Smith Center (20,581); Chapel Hill, NC
1/13/2010; 7:00pm		No. 23 Miami (FL)	W 81–66	13–2 (1–1)	Cassell Coliseum (9,827); Blacksburg, VA
1/16/2010; 6:00pm		at No. 25 Florida State	L 63–58	13–3 (1–2)	Donald L. Tucker Center (9,214); Tallahassee, FL
1/18/2010*; 8:00pm		at NC Central	W 72–30	14–3	Cassell Coliseum (9,762); Blacksburg, VA
1/23/2010; 1:30pm, Raycom Sports		Boston College	W 63–62	15–3 (2–2)	Cassell Coliseum (9,847); Blacksburg, VA
1/28/2010; 7:00pm, Comcast Sports Net		at Virginia	W 76–71 ^{OT}	16–3 (3–2)	John Paul Jones Arena (13,449); Charlottesville, VA
1/31/2010; 1:00pm, Raycom Sports		at Miami (FL)	L 82–75	16–4 (3–3)	BankUnited Center (7,189); Coral Gables, FL
2/4/2010; 9:00pm, Raycom Sports		North Carolina	W 74–70	17–4 (4–3)	Cassell Coliseum (9,847); Blacksburg, VA
2/6/2010; 4:00pm, Raycom Sports		Clemson	W 70–59	18–4 (5–3)	Cassell Coliseum (9,847); Blacksburg, VA
2/10/2010; 9:00pm, ESPNU		at North Carolina State	W 72–52	19–4 (6–3)	RBC Center (14,024); Raleigh, NC
2/13/2010; 8:00pm, Raycom Sports		Virginia	W 61–55	20–4 (7–3)	Cassell Coliseum (9,847); Blacksburg, VA
2/16/2010; 7:00pm, ESPN2		No. 23 Wake Forest	W 87–83	21–4 (8–3)	Cassell Coliseum (9,847); Blacksburg, VA
2/21/2010; 7:45pm, FSN		at No. 6 Duke	L 67–55	21–5 (8–4)	Cameron Indoor Stadium (9,314); Durham, NC
2/24/2010; 7:00pm, ESPNU		at Boston College	L 80–60	21–6 (8–5)	Conte Forum (4,632); Chestnut Hill, MA
2/27/2010; 4:00pm, Raycom Sports		Maryland	L 104–100 ^{2OT}	21–7 (8–6)	Cassell Coliseum (9,847); Blacksburg, VA
3/3/2010; 7:00pm		North Carolina State	W 71–59	22–7 (9–6)	Cassell Coliseum (9,847); Blacksburg, VA
3/6/2010; 4:00pm, Raycom Sports		at Georgia Tech	W 88–82	23–7 (10–6)	Alexander Memorial Coliseum (8,725); Atlanta, GA
ACC tournament
3/12/2010; 2:00pm, ESPN		vs. Miami (FL); Quarterfinals	L 80–75	23–8	Greensboro Coliseum (23,381); Greensboro, NC
2010 National Invitation Tournament
3/17/2010; 7:00pm		Quinnipiac; First Round	W 81–61	24–8	Cassell Coliseum (5,264); Blacksburg, VA
3/22/2010; 7:00pm, ESPN		Connecticut; Second Round	W 65–63	25–8	Cassell Coliseum (6,983); Blacksburg, VA
3/24/2010; 7:00pm, ESPN2		Rhode Island; Quarterfinals	L 79–72	25–9	Cassell Coliseum (7,055); Blacksburg, VA
*Non-conference game. ^{#}Rankings from AP Poll. (#) Tournament seedings in parentheses.
