= 2009–10 Longwood Lancers men's basketball team =

American college basketball season

2009–10 Longwood Lancers men's basketball
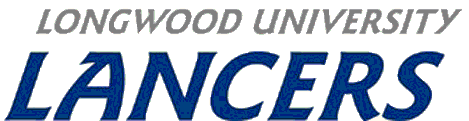
- Conference: Independent
- Record: 12–19
- Head coach: Mike Gillian (7th season)
- Assistant coaches: Bill Reinson (8th season); Doug Thibault (7th season); Tim Fudd (3rd season)
- Home arena: Willett Hall

2009–10 NCAA Division I men's basketball independents standings
	Conf.				Overall
Team	W		L	PCT	W		L	PCT
Seattle		–		–	17	–	14	.548
Savannah State		–		–	11	–	15	.423
Winston–Salem State		–		–	12	–	17	.414
Longwood		–		–	12	–	19	.387
Cal State Bakersfield		–		–	7	–	22	.241
North Carolina Central		–		–	7	–	22	.241
SIU Edwardsville		–		–	5	–	23	.179
Rankings from AP Poll

The 2009–10 Longwood Lancers men's basketball team represented Longwood University during the 2009–10 NCAA Division I men's basketball season. The team was led by seventh-year head coach Mike Gillian, and played their home games at Willett Hall as a Division I independent school.

== Last season ==
The Lancers had a record of 17–14, their best record in the Mike Gillian era.

== Roster ==
2009–10 Longwood Lancers men's basketball team
Players
Coaches

Pos.	#	Name	Height	Weight	Year	Previous school	Hometown
G	1	E.J. Dawson	6 ft 2 in (1.88 m)	185 lb (84 kg)	Sr	Mount Vernon HS	Alexandria, Virginia
C	4	Antwan Carter	6 ft 6 in (1.98 m)	225 lb (102 kg)	So	St. Petersburg HS	St. Petersburg, Florida
G	5	Martiz Washington	6 ft 0 in (1.83 m)	170 lb (77 kg)	So	Christchurch	Hopewell, Virginia
G	10	Stephen Shockley	6 ft 0 in (1.83 m)	180 lb (82 kg)	Fr	Heritage HS	Leesburg, Virginia
G	11	Earl Gee II	5 ft 10 in (1.78 m)	155 lb (70 kg)	Jr	Manchester HS	Chesterfield, Virginia
F	12	Billy Robinson, Jr.	6 ft 7 in (2.01 m)	200 lb (91 kg)	Sr	Hammond, HS	Columbia, Maryland
G	15	Ian Persaud	6 ft 2 in (1.88 m)	160 lb (73 kg)	Jr	Prince George's CC	Landover, Maryland
G	20	Aaron Mitchell	6 ft 2 in (1.88 m)	188 lb (85 kg)	Jr	Manatee HS	Matoaca, Virginia
G/F	22	Dana Smith	6 ft 5 in (1.96 m)	230 lb (104 kg)	Sr	C. D. Hylton HS	Woodbridge, Virginia
G	24	Kevin Swecker	6 ft 1 in (1.85 m)	180 lb (82 kg)	Sr	Mount Saint Joseph HS	Manchester, Maryland
G	25	Durann Neil	6 ft 1 in (1.85 m)	185 lb (84 kg)	Jr	Leap Academy	Pleasantville, New Jersey
F	31	Jeffrey Ryan	6 ft 7 in (2.01 m)	185 lb (84 kg)	Jr	Newburgh	Beacon, New York
F	33	Jan van der Kooij	6 ft 7 in (2.01 m)	218 lb (99 kg)	So	Roelof van Echten	Tiendeveen, Netherlands

Head coach

- Mike Gillian (North Adams State)

Assistant coach(es)

- Bill Reinson (Phoenix)
- Doug Thibault (Boise State)
- Tim Fudd (American)

Legend

- (C) Team captain
- (S) Suspended
- (I) Ineligible
- (W) Walk-on
- Injured
- Current redshirt

Roster
Last update: February 23, 2015

== Schedule ==
Date time, TV	Opponent	Result	Record	Site (attendance) city, state
Regular season
November 13*; 7:00 pm	at Virginia	L 72–85	0–1	John Paul Jones Arena (10,787); Charlottesville, VA
November 15*; 4:00 pm	Navy	L 76–79	0–2	Willett Hall (1,715); Farmville, VA
November 17*; 7:00 pm	at Old Dominion; South Padre Island Invitational	L 59–98	0–3	Ted Constant Convocation Center (6,264); Norfolk, VA
November 20*; 7:00 pm	at Columbia	L 61–72	0–4	Levien Gymnasium (856); New York, NY
November 24*; 7:00 pm	Richmond; South Padre Island Invitational	L 52–65	0–5	Robins Center (3,338); Richmond, VA
November 27*; 1:00 pm	vs. Bethune–Cookman; South Padre Island Invitational	L 62–66	0–6	South Padre Island Convention Centre; South Padre Island, TX
November 28*; 12:30 pm	vs. Chattanooga; South Padre Island Invitational	L 70–74	0–7	South Padre Island Convention Centre; South Padre Island, TX
December 2*; 7:00 pm	at William & Mary	L 65–84	0–8	William & Mary Hall (1,958); Williamsburg, VA
December 5*; 2:00 pm	Florida Gulf Coast	W 82–75	1–8	Willett Hall (1,105); Farmville, VA
December 12*; 1:30 pm	Stephen F. Austin	L 69–73	1–9	Willett Hall (512); Farmville, VA
December 14*; 7:00 pm	Virginia-Wise	W 87–69	2–9	Willett Hall (504); Farmville, VA
December 22*; 7:00 pm	Campbell	W 88–80	3–9	Willett Hall (322); Farmville, VA
December 28*; 7:00 pm	Lehigh	L 78–89	3–10	Willett Hall (528); Farmville, VA
December 30*; 2:00 pm	at Virginia Tech	L 50–85	3–11	Cassell Coliseum (9,836); Blacksburg, VA
January 2*; 2:00 pm	at Colgate	L 80–95	3–12	Cotterell Court (384); Hamilton, NY
January 5*; 7:00 pm, FSS	at South Carolina	L 58–88	3–13	Colonial Life Arena (8,652); Columbia, SC
January 9*; 10:00 pm	at Cal State Bakersfield	W 82–81	4–13	Rabobank Arena (1,413); Bakersfield, CA
January 12*; 8:00 pm	at South Dakota	L 63–75	4–14	DakotaDome (1,056); Vermillion, SD
January 19*; 8:00 pm, CSN+	at Maryland	L 55–106	4–15	Comcast Center (14,818); College Park, MD
January 23*; 2:00 pm	at Savannah State	L 66–68	4–16	Tiger Arena (1,011); Savannah, GA
January 30*; 7:00 pm	Washington Adventist	W 112–90	5–16	Willett Hall (930); Farmville, VA
February 2*; 7:00 pm	High Point	W 70–66	6–16	Willett Hall (1,702); Farmville, VA
February 6*; 2:00 pm	at NJIT	W 64–55	7–16	Fleisher Center (258); Newark, NJ
February 8*; 7:00 pm	at Fairleigh Dickinson	W 83–81	8–16	Rothman Center (214); Hackensack, NJ
February 11*; 7:00 pm	Virginia Intermont	W 101–66	9–16	Willett Hall (1,311); Farmville, VA
February 13*; 7:00 pm	at North Carolina Central	L 78–81	9–17	McLendon–McDougald Gymnasium (1,349); Durham, NC
February 17*; 7:00 pm	Southern Virginia	W 96–77	10–17	Willett Hall (1,117); Farmville, VA
February 20*; 2:00 pm	Savannah State	W 68–54	11–17	Willett Hall (1,220); Farmville, VA
February 22*; 7:00 pm	at James Madison	L 86–96	11–18	JMU Convocation Center (3,155); Harrisonburg, VA
February 25*; 7:00 pm	North Carolina Central	W 83–69	12–18	Willett Hall (1,425); Farmville, VA
March 1*; 7:00 pm	at Hampton	L 81–95	12–19	Hampton Convocation Center (3,254); Hampton, VA
*Non-conference game. (#) Tournament seedings in parentheses. All times are in Eastern Time.
