= 2009–10 NC State Wolfpack men's basketball team =

American college basketball season

2009–10 NC State Wolfpack men's basketball

Glenn Wilkes Classic Champions

NIT, Second Round
- Conference: Atlantic Coast Conference
- Record: 20–16 (5–11 ACC)
- Head coach: Sidney Lowe
- Assistant coaches: Monte Towe; Larry Harris; Pete Strickland
- Home arena: RBC Center

2009–10 ACC men's basketball standings
	Conf.				Overall
Team	W		L	PCT	W		L	PCT
No. 3 Duke †	13	–	3	.813	35	–	5	.875
No. 20 Maryland	13	–	3	.813	24	–	9	.727
Florida State	10	–	6	.625	22	–	10	.688
Virginia Tech	10	–	6	.625	25	–	9	.735
Wake Forest	9	–	7	.563	20	–	10	.667
Clemson	9	–	7	.563	21	–	11	.656
Georgia Tech	7	–	9	.438	23	–	13	.639
Boston College	6	–	10	.375	15	–	16	.484
Virginia	5	–	11	.313	15	–	16	.484
North Carolina	5	–	11	.313	20	–	17	.541
NC State	5	–	11	.313	20	–	16	.556
Miami (FL)	4	–	12	.250	20	–	13	.606
† 2010 ACC tournament winner As of March 19, 2010; Rankings from AP Poll

The 2009–10 NC State Wolfpack men's basketball team represented NC State University in the 2009–10 men's college basketball season. The team were coached by Sidney Lowe and played their home games at the RBC Center in Raleigh, NC. The Wolfpack is a member of the Atlantic Coast Conference.

The 2009–10 season marked the 100th season of Wolfpack men's basketball. NC State finished the season 20–16 (5–11 in ACC play). The team advanced to the quarterfinals of the 2010 ACC men's basketball tournament before losing to Georgia Tech. They were invited to the 2010 National Invitation Tournament and advanced to the second round before being defeated by UAB.

== 2009–10 roster ==
Note: Flags indicate national team eligibility at FIBA sanctioned events. Players may hold other non-FIBA nationality not displayed.

No.		Position	Player
1	(United States)	F	Richard Howell
4	(Germany)	G	Enrico Kufuor
5	(United States)	F	DeShawn Painter
10	(Puerto Rico)	G	Javier González
12	(United States)	G	Farnold Degand
14	(Australia)	C	Jordan Vandenberg
15	(United States)	G/F	Scott Wood
21	(United States)	F	C. J. Williams
22	(United States)	F	Josh Davis
23	(United States)	F	Tracy Smith
24	(United States)	G	Julius Mays
25	(United States)	F	Kendall Smith
30	(United States)	F	Johnny Thomas
31	(United States)	F	Dennis Horner
40	(United States)	F	Kaycee Obi-Gwacham

== 2009–10 schedule ==
Date time, TV	Rank^{#}	Opponent^{#}	Result	Record	Site (attendance) city, state
Exhibition
Thu, Nov 5*; 7:00pm		St. Paul's College	W 84–42		Reynolds Coliseum; Raleigh, NC
Regular season
Thu, Nov 12*; 7:00pm		Georgia State	W 69–53	1–0	RBC Center (9,502); Raleigh, NC
Fri, Nov 20*; 3:30pm		vs. Akron; Glenn Wilkes Classic	W 66–45	2–0	Ocean Center (416); Daytona Beach, FL
Sat, Nov 21*; 8:15pm		vs. Austin Peay; Glenn Wilkes Classic	W 66–59	3–0	Ocean Center (457); Daytona Beach, FL
Sun, Nov 22*; 8:15pm		vs. Auburn; Glenn Wilkes Classic	W 60–58	4–0	Ocean Center (616); Daytona Beach, FL
Sun, Nov 29*; 2:00pm		New Orleans	W 69–52	5–0	RBC Center (11,027); Raleigh, NC
Tue, Dec 1*; 7:00pm, ESPNU		Northwestern; ACC – Big Ten Challenge	L 53–65	5–1	RBC Center (11,913); Raleigh, NC
Sat, Dec 5*; 3:00pm		at Marquette	W 77–73	6–1	Bradley Center (15,803); Milwaukee, WI
Sat, Dec 12*; 2:00pm		Georgia Southern	W 75–57	7–1	Reynolds Coliseum (4,297); Raleigh, NC
Thu, Dec 17*; 7:00pm		Elon	W 79–76	8–1	RBC Center (12,892); Raleigh, NC
Sun, Dec 20; 7:45pm, FSN		at Wake Forest	L 59–67	8–2 (0-1)	LJVM Coliseum (14,255); Winston–Salem, NC
Wed, Dec 23*; 10:30pm, FSN		at Arizona	L 74–76	8–3	McKale Center (12,809); Tucson, AZ
Tue, Dec 29*; 7:00pm		Winthrop	W 68–52	9–3	RBC Center (13,233); Raleigh, NC
Thu, Dec 31*; 6:00pm, FSN		at UNC Greensboro	W 89–67	10–3	Greensboro Coliseum (5,072); Greensboro, NC
Sun, Jan 3*; 3:00pm, FSN		Florida	L 61–62 ^{OT}	10–4	RBC Center (17,207); Raleigh, NC
Wed, Jan 6*; 7:00pm		Holy Cross	W 87–70	11–4	RBC Center (10,205); Raleigh, NC
Sat, Jan 9; 12:00pm, Raycom		Virginia	L 62–70	11–5 (0-2)	RBC Center (16,289); Raleigh, NC
Tue, Jan 12; 7:00pm, FSN		at No. 25 Florida State	W 88–81	12–5 (1-2)	Donald L. Tucker Center (9,709); Tallahassee, FL
Sat, Jan 16; 12:00pm, Raycom		No. 24 Clemson	L 70–73	12–6 (1–3)	RBC Center (17,984); Raleigh, NC
Wed, Jan 20; 9:00pm, Raycom		No. 7 Duke	W 88–74	13–6 (2–3)	RBC Center (18,925); Raleigh, NC
Sat, Jan 23; 6:00pm, ESPN2		at Maryland	L 64–88	13–7 (2–4)	Comcast Center (17,950); College Park, MD
Tue, Jan 26; 9:00pm, Raycom		North Carolina; NC State – North Carolina Rivalry	L 63–77	13–8 (2–5)	RBC Center (19,700); Raleigh, NC
Sat, Jan 30*; 2:00pm		North Carolina Central	W 77–42	14–8	RBC Center (2,217); Raleigh, NC
Wed, Feb 3; 7:00pm, ESPNU		at Virginia	L 47–59	14–9 (2–6)	John Paul Jones Arena (10,092); Charlottesville, VA
Sat, Feb 6; 4:00pm, Raycom		at No. 21 Georgia Tech	L 71–73	14–10 (2–7)	Alexander Memorial Coliseum (8,760); Atlanta, GA
Wed, Feb 10; 9:00pm, ESPNU		Virginia Tech	L 52–72	14–11 (2–8)	RBC Center (14,024); Raleigh, NC
Sat, Feb 13; 4:00pm, ESPN		at North Carolina; NC State – North Carolina Rivalry	L 61–74	14–12 (2–9)	Dean Smith Center (19,786); Chapel Hill, NC
Wed, Feb 17; 9:00pm, FSN		Maryland	L 58–67	14–13 (2–10)	RBC Center (14,288); Raleigh, NC
Sat, Feb 20; 2:00pm, Raycom		No. 23 Wake Forest	W 68–54	15–13 (3–10)	RBC Center (15,324); Raleigh, NC
Sat, Feb 27; 4:00pm, Raycom		at Miami (FL)	W 71–66	16–13 (4–10)	BankUnited Center (4,358); Coral Gables, FL
Wed, Mar 3; 7:00pm, Raycom		at Virginia Tech	L 59–71	16–14 (4–11)	Cassell Coliseum (9,847); Blacksburg, VA
Sun, Mar 7; 2:00pm, Raycom		Boston College	W 66–54	17–14 (5–11)	RBC Center (15,104); Raleigh, NC
ACC tournament
Thu, Mar 11; 9:00pm, Raycom		vs. Clemson; First Round	W 59–57	18–14	Greensboro Coliseum (23,381); Greensboro, NC
Fri, Mar 12; 9:00pm, Raycom/ESPN		vs. Florida State; Quarterfinals	W 58–52	19–14	Greensboro Coliseum (23,318); Greensboro, NC
Sat, Mar 13; 3:30pm, Raycom/ESPN		vs. Georgia Tech; Semifinals	L 54–57	19–15	Greensboro Coliseum (23,381); Greensboro, NC
National Invitation Tournament
Tue, Mar 16*; 8:00pm, ESPNU		at South Florida; First Round	W 58–57	20–15	USF Sun Dome (3,502); Tampa, FL
Sat, Mar 20*; 5:00pm, ESPNU		at UAB; Second Round	L 52–72	20–16	Bartow Arena (4,096); Birmingham, AL
*Non-conference game. ^{#}Rankings from AP poll. (#) Tournament seedings in parentheses. All times are in Eastern Time.
