= 2009–10 Maryland Terrapins men's basketball team =

American college basketball season

2009–10 Maryland Terrapins men's basketball
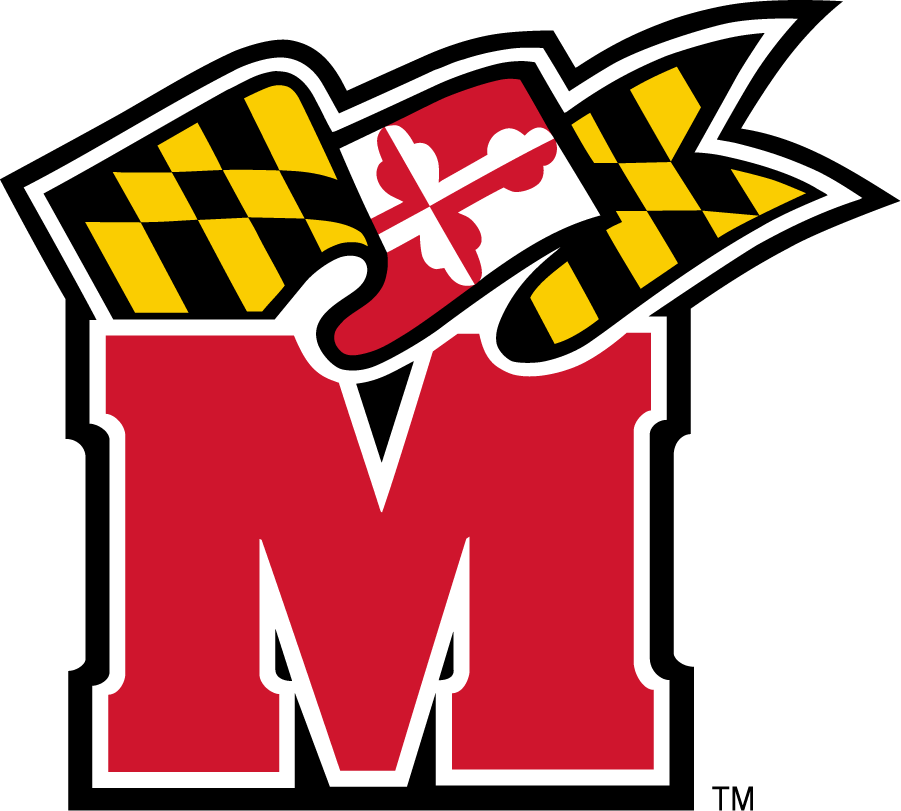

ACC Regular Season Co-Champions

NCAA tournament, Round of 32
- Conference: Atlantic Coast Conference

Ranking
- Coaches: No. 18
- AP: No. 20
- Record: 24–9 (13–3 ACC)
- Head coach: Gary Williams
- Assistant coach: Keith Booth; Chuck Driesell; Robert Ehsan; Troy Wainwright
- Home arena: Comcast Center

2009–10 ACC men's basketball standings
	Conf.				Overall
Team	W		L	PCT	W		L	PCT
No. 3 Duke †	13	–	3	.813	35	–	5	.875
No. 20 Maryland	13	–	3	.813	24	–	9	.727
Florida State	10	–	6	.625	22	–	10	.688
Virginia Tech	10	–	6	.625	25	–	9	.735
Wake Forest	9	–	7	.563	20	–	10	.667
Clemson	9	–	7	.563	21	–	11	.656
Georgia Tech	7	–	9	.438	23	–	13	.639
Boston College	6	–	10	.375	15	–	16	.484
Virginia	5	–	11	.313	15	–	16	.484
North Carolina	5	–	11	.313	20	–	17	.541
NC State	5	–	11	.313	20	–	16	.556
Miami (FL)	4	–	12	.250	20	–	13	.606
† 2010 ACC tournament winner As of March 19, 2010; Rankings from AP Poll

The 2009–10 Maryland Terrapins men's basketball team represented the University of Maryland in the 2009–10 college basketball season as a member of the Atlantic Coast Conference (ACC). Gary Williams was in his 21st year as the team's head coach. The Terrapins finished the season 24–9, 13–3 in ACC play, to claim a share of the regular-season championship with Duke. They lost in the quarterfinals of the 2010 ACC men's basketball tournament to Georgia Tech. They received an at-large bid to the 2010 NCAA Division I men's basketball tournament, earning a 4-seed in the Midwest Region. They defeated 13-seed Houston in the first round before losing to 5-seed and AP #13 Michigan State in the second round.

In a rare double-sweep of regular-season awards, Williams was voted as the ACC Coach of the Year while Greivis Vásquez was named the ACC Player of the Year.

== Preseason ==
=== Recruiting ===
College recruiting information
Name	Hometown	School	Height	Weight	Commit date
James Padgett; PF	Brooklyn, New York	Abraham Lincoln High School	6 ft 7 in (2.01 m)	210 lb (95 kg)	Sep 27, 2008
James Padgett; PF	Recruit ratings: Scout: Rivals:				
Jordan Williams; PF	Torrington, Connecticut	Torrington High School	6 ft 9 in (2.06 m)	245 lb (111 kg)	Oct 21, 2008
Jordan Williams; PF	Recruit ratings: Scout: Rivals:				
Overall recruit ranking: Scout: Not Ranked Rivals: 9
Note: In many cases, Scout, Rivals, 247Sports, On3, and ESPN may conflict in their listings of height and weight.; In these cases, the average was taken. ESPN grades are on a 100-point scale.; Sources: "Men's Basketball Recruiting". Scout.; "College Basketball Recruiting Schools". ESPN.; "Scout.com Team Recruiting Rankings". Scout.; "2009 Team Ranking". Rivals.

== Roster ==
2009–10 Maryland Terrapins men's basketball team
Players
Coaches

Pos.	#	Name	Height	Weight	Year	Hometown
F	1	Landon Milbourne	6 ft 7 in (2.01 m)	205 lb (93 kg)	Sr	Roswell, Georgia
G	5	Eric Hayes	6 ft 4 in (1.93 m)	180 lb (82 kg)	Sr	Woodbridge, Virginia
G	14	Sean Mosley	6 ft 4 in (1.93 m)	210 lb (95 kg)	So	Baltimore, Maryland
F	15	Ersin Levent	6 ft 7 in (2.01 m)	185 lb (84 kg)	So	Rockville, Maryland
F	20	Jordan Williams	6 ft 10 in (2.08 m)	260 lb (118 kg)	Fr	Torrington, Connecticut
G	21	Greivis Vasquez	6 ft 6 in (1.98 m)	200 lb (91 kg)	Sr	Caracas, Venezuela
G	22	Adrian Bowie	6 ft 2 in (1.88 m)	190 lb (86 kg)	Jr	Greenbelt, Maryland
G/F	23	David Pearman	6 ft 6 in (1.98 m)	200 lb (91 kg)	Jr	Columbia, Maryland
G/F	24	Cliff Tucker	6 ft 6 in (1.98 m)	205 lb (93 kg)	Jr	El Paso, Texas
C	25	Steve Goins	6 ft 10 in (2.08 m)	245 lb (111 kg)	So	Chicago
F	33	Dino Gregory	6 ft 7 in (2.01 m)	230 lb (104 kg)	Jr	Baltimore
F	35	James Padgett	6 ft 8 in (2.03 m)	225 lb (102 kg)	Fr	Brooklyn

Head coach

- Gary Williams (Maryland)

Assistant coach(es)

- Keith Booth (Maryland)
- Chuck Driesell (Maryland)
- Robert Ehsan (UC Davis)
- Troy Wainwright (Maryland)

Legend

- (C) Team captain
- (S) Suspended
- (I) Ineligible
- (W) Walk-on
- Injured
- Current redshirt

Roster
Last update: 2010-03-13

== Season recap ==
The season began with Greivis Vásquez, Eric Hayes, and Landon Milbourne all leading the team as Seniors.

=== Accolades ===
Gary Williams
ACC Coach of the Year

Greivis Vásquez
ACC Player of the Year
2nd Team All-American
Bob Cousy Award winner
The Sporting News First-Team All-American
Wooden Award finalist

Jordan Williams
ACC All-Freshman team

== Schedule ==
Date time, TV	Rank^{#}	Opponent^{#}	Result	Record	Site (attendance) city, state
Exhibition
11/03/2009*; 8:00 pm		Indiana (PA)	W 75–54	—	Comcast Center; College Park, Maryland
Regular season
11/13/2009*; 8:00 pm, CSN		Charleston Southern	W 89–51	1–0	Comcast Center (16,812); College Park, Maryland
11/17/2009*; 8:00 pm, CSN	No. 25	Fairfield	W 71–42	2–0	Comcast Center (16,227); College Park, Maryland
11/20/2009*; 8:00 pm	No. 25	New Hampshire	W 82–55	3–0	Comcast Center (17,180); College Park, Maryland
11/23/2009*; 9:30 pm, ESPNU	No. 21	at Chaminade; Maui Invitational	W 79–51	4–0	Lahaina Civic Center (2,400); Maui, HI
11/24/2009*; 7:00 pm, ESPNU	No. 21	vs. Cincinnati; Maui Invitational	L 57–69	4–1	Lahaina Civic Center (2,400); Maui, HI
11/24/2009*; 4:30 pm, ESPNU	No. 21	vs. Wisconsin; Maui Invitational	L 69–78	4–2	Lahaina Civic Center (2,400); Maui, HI
12/01/2009*; 7:30 pm, ESPN2		at Indiana; Big Ten/ACC Challenge	W 80–68	5–2	Assembly Hall (17,039); Bloomington, Indiana
12/06/2009*; 7:30 pm, MASN		vs. No. 4 Villanova; BB&T Classic	L 86–95	5–3	Verizon Center (16,389); Washington, D.C.
12/12/2009*; 2:00 pm, CSN		Eastern Kentucky	W 83–72	6–3	Comcast Center (16,183); College Park, Maryland
12/22/2009*; 8:00 pm		Winston-Salem State	W 98–55	7–3	Comcast Center (14,262); College Park, Maryland
12/27/2009*; 8:00 pm		Florida Atlantic	W 72–59	8–3	Comcast Center (15,123); College Park, Maryland
12/30/2009*; 7:30 pm		William & Mary	L 77–83	8–4	Comcast Center (16,418); College Park, Maryland
01/03/2010*; 2:00 pm		UNC Greensboro	W 97–63	9–4	Greensboro Coliseum (3,297); Greensboro, North Carolina
01/10/2010; 5:30 pm, FSN		No. 18 Florida State	W 77–68	10–4 (1–0)	Comcast Center (17,295); College Park, Maryland
01/12/2010; 8:00 pm, Raycom		at Wake Forest	L 83–85 ^{OT}	10–5 (1–1)	LJVM Coliseum (12,925); Winston-Salem, North Carolina
01/16/2010; 4:00 pm, Raycom		at Boston College	W 73–57	11–5 (2–1)	Conte Forum (8,606); Chestnut Hill, Massachusetts
01/19/2010*; 8:00 pm, CSN+		Longwood	W 106–55	12–5 (2–1)	Comcast Center (14,818); College Park, Maryland
01/23/2010; 6:00 pm, ESPN2		NC State	W 88–64	13–5 (3–1)	Comcast Center (17,950); College Park, Maryland
01/26/2010; 7:00 pm, ESPNU		Miami (FL)	W 81–59	14–5 (4–1)	Comcast Center (17,950); College Park, Maryland
01/31/2010; 5:30 pm, FSN		at Clemson	L 53–62	14–6 (4–2)	Littlejohn Coliseum (10,000); Clemson, South Carolina
02/4/2010; 9:00 pm, Raycom		at Florida State	W 71–67	15–6 (5–2)	Tucker Center (9,228); Tallahassee, Florida
02/7/2010; 2:00 pm, FSN		North Carolina	W 92–71	16–6 (6–2)	Comcast Center (17,950); College Park, Maryland
02/13/2010; 1:00 pm, CBS		at No. 8 Duke	L 56–77	16–7 (6–3)	Cameron Indoor Stadium (9,314); Durham, North Carolina
02/15/2010; 8:00 pm, ESPN		Virginia	W 85–66	17–7 (7–3)	Comcast Center (17,091); College Park, Maryland
02/17/2010; 9:00 pm, RSN		at NC State	W 67–58	18–7 (8–3)	RBC Center (14,288); Raleigh, North Carolina
02/20/2010; 2:00 pm, Raycom		Georgia Tech	W 76–74	19–7 (9–3)	Comcast Center (17,950); College Park, Maryland
02/24/2010; 9:00 pm, Raycom		Clemson	W 88–79	20–7 (10–3)	Comcast Center (17,514); College Park, Maryland
02/27/2010; 4:00 pm, Raycom		at Virginia Tech	W 104–100 ^{2OT}	21–7 (11–3)	Cassell Coliseum (9,847); Blacksburg, Virginia
03/3/2010; 9:00 pm, ESPN	No. 22	No. 4 Duke	W 79–72	22–7 (12–3)	Comcast Center (17,950); College Park, Maryland
03/6/2010; 1:30 pm, Raycom	No. 22	at Virginia	W 74–68	23–7 (13–3)	JPJ Arena (13,431); Charlottesville, Virginia
ACC tournament
03/12/2010; 7:00 pm, ESPN2	(2) No. 19	vs. (7) Georgia Tech; ACC Quarterfinals	L 64–69	23–8	Greensboro Coliseum; Greensboro, North Carolina
NCAA tournament
3/19/2010*; 9:40 pm, CBS	(4 MW) No. 20	vs. (13 MW) Houston; NCAA First Round	W 89–77	24–8	Spokane Veterans Memorial Arena (10,861); Spokane, WA
3/21/2010*; 2:30 pm, CBS	(4 MW) No. 20	vs. (5 MW) No. 13 Michigan State; NCAA Second Round	L 83–85	24–9	Spokane Veterans Memorial Arena (11,015); Spokane, WA
*Non-conference game. ^{#}Rankings from AP Poll. (#) Tournament seedings in parentheses. MW=NCAA Midwest Regional. All times are in Eastern Time.
