= 2009–10 Florida State Seminoles men's basketball team =

American college basketball season

2009–10 Florida State Seminoles men's basketball

Old Spice Classic Champions

NCAA tournament, Round of 64
- Conference: Atlantic Coast Conference
- Record: 22–10 (10–6 ACC)
- Head coach: Leonard Hamilton (8th year)
- Assistant coaches: Stan Jones; Andy Enfield; Corey Williams
- Home arena: Donald L. Tucker Center (Capacity: 12,100)

2009–10 ACC men's basketball standings
	Conf.				Overall
Team	W		L	PCT	W		L	PCT
No. 3 Duke †	13	–	3	.813	35	–	5	.875
No. 20 Maryland	13	–	3	.813	24	–	9	.727
Florida State	10	–	6	.625	22	–	10	.688
Virginia Tech	10	–	6	.625	25	–	9	.735
Wake Forest	9	–	7	.563	20	–	10	.667
Clemson	9	–	7	.563	21	–	11	.656
Georgia Tech	7	–	9	.438	23	–	13	.639
Boston College	6	–	10	.375	15	–	16	.484
Virginia	5	–	11	.313	15	–	16	.484
North Carolina	5	–	11	.313	20	–	17	.541
NC State	5	–	11	.313	20	–	16	.556
Miami (FL)	4	–	12	.250	20	–	13	.606
† 2010 ACC tournament winner As of March 19, 2010; Rankings from AP Poll

The 2009–10 Florida State Seminoles men's basketball team represented Florida State University in the 2009–2010 NCAA Division I basketball season. The Seminoles were coached by Leonard Hamilton and played their home games at the Donald L. Tucker Center in Tallahassee, Florida. The Seminoles were a member of the Atlantic Coast Conference.

The Seminoles finished the season 22–10, 10–6 in ACC play. They lost in the quarterfinals of the 2010 ACC men's basketball tournament. They received an at-large bid to the 2010 NCAA Division I men's basketball tournament, earning a 9 seed in the West Region, where they lost to 8 seed Gonzaga in the first round.

== Roster ==
#	Name	Height	Weight (lbs.)	Position	Class	Hometown	Previous team(s)
0	Pierre Jordan	6'0"	165	G	Fr.	Atlanta	Dunwoody HS
1	Xavier Gibson	6'11"	240	F/C	So.	Dothan, Alabama	Dothan HS
3	Luke Loucks	6'5"	196	G	So.	Clearwater, Florida	Clearwater HS
4	Deividas Dulkys	6'5"	196	G	So.	Šilutė, Lithuania	Findlay Prep
15	Terrance Shannon	6'8"	220	F	Fr.	Forsyth, Georgia	Mary Persons HS
21	Michael Snaer	6'5"	200	G	Fr.	Moreno Valley, California	Rancho Verde HS
22	Derwin Kitchen	6'4"	204	G	Jr.	Jacksonville, Florida	Raines HS; Iowa Western CC
24	Andrew Rutledge	6'6"	200	F	Jr.	Tallahassee, Florida	Maclay School
30	A.J. Yawn	6'0"	170	G	Sr.	Oceanside, California	El Camino HS
31	Chris Singleton	6'9"	227	F	So.	Canton, Georgia	Dunwoody HS
32	Solomon Alabi	7'1"	251	C	So.	Kaduna, Nigeria	Montverde Academy
33	Joey Moreau	6'2"	165	G	Fr.	Bradenton, Florida	IMG Academy
42	Ryan Reid	6'8"	238	F	Sr.	Lauderdale Lakes, Florida	Boyd Anderson HS

== Schedule ==
Date time, TV	Rank^{#}	Opponent^{#}	Result	Record	Site (attendance) city, state
Exhibition
November 3*; 7:00 p.m.		Delta State	W 81–38	0–0	Donald L. Tucker Center; Tallahassee, FL
November 9*; 7:00 p.m.		Georgetown (KY)	W 73–61	0–0	Donald L. Tucker Center; Tallahassee, FL
Regular season
November 16*; 7:00 p.m., Sun Sports		Jacksonville	W 87–61	1–0	Donald L. Tucker Center (6,493); Tallahassee, FL
November 18*; 7:00 p.m.		Stetson	W 80–38	2–0	Donald L. Tucker Center (6,525); Tallahassee, FL
November 21*; 4:30 p.m., FS South		at Mercer	W 89–50	3–0	University Center (3,200); Macon, GA
November 24*; 7:00 p.m., FS South/Sun Sports		at Florida; Rivalry	L 68–52	3–1	O'Connell Center (11,239); Gainesville, FL
November 26*; 9:00 p.m., ESPNU		vs. Iona; Old Spice Classic	W 54–46	4–1	Disney's Wide World of Sports Complex (2,149); Lake Buena Vista, FL
November 27*; 5:00 p.m., ESPN2		vs. Alabama; Old Spice Classic	W 60–51	5–1	Disney's Wide World of Sports Complex (1,915); Lake Buena Vista, FL
November 29*; 3:30 p.m., ESPN2		vs. Marquette; Old Spice Classic	W 57–56	6–1	Disney's Wide World of Sports Complex (2,225); Lake Buena Vista, FL
December 2*; 9:30 p.m., ESPN2	No. 21	at No. 15 Ohio State; ACC – Big Ten Challenge	L 77–64	6–2	Jerome Schottenstein Center (13,514); Columbus, OH
December 6*; 1:00 p.m., Sun Sports	No. 21	Florida International	W 82–62	7–2	Donald L. Tucker Center (5,168); Tallahassee, FL
December 15*; 7:00 p.m.		Georgia State	W 62–55	8–2	Donald L. Tucker Center (5,281); Tallahassee, FL
December 17*; 7:00 p.m., FSFL		Auburn	W 76–72	9–2	Donald L. Tucker Center (6,063); Tallahassee, FL
December 20; 5:30 p.m., FSN		at No. 22 Georgia Tech	W 66–59 ^{OT}	10–2 (1–0)	Alexander Memorial Coliseum (8,225); Atlanta, GA
December 22*; 7:00 p.m., FSFL		Tennessee-Martin	W 95–68	11–2	Donald L. Tucker Center (5,231); Tallahassee, FL
December 31*; 4:00 p.m.	No. 22	Alabama A&M	W 81–34	12–2	Donald L. Tucker Center (4,412); Tallahassee, FL
January 4*; 7:00 p.m.	No. 18	Texas A&M – Corpus Christi	W 94–54	13–2	Donald L. Tucker Center (5,576); Tallahassee, FL
January 10; 5:30 p.m., FSN	No. 18	at Maryland	L 77–68	13–3 (1–1)	Comcast Center (17,295); College Park, MD
January 12; 7:00 p.m., Sun Sports	No. 25	NC State	L 88–81	13–4 (1–2)	Donald L. Tucker Center (9,709); Tallahassee, FL
January 16; 6:00 p.m., FSFL	No. 25	Virginia Tech	W 63–58	14–4 (2–2)	Donald L. Tucker Center (9,214); Tallahassee, FL
January 24; 12:00 p.m., RSN		No. 19 Georgia Tech	W 68–66	15–4 (3–2)	Donald L. Tucker Center (8,661); Tallahassee, FL
January 27; 9:00 p.m., ESPN		at No. 8 Duke	L 70–56	15–5 (3–3)	Cameron Indoor Stadium (9,314); Durham, NC
January 30; 3:00 p.m., RSN		at Boston College	W 61–57	16–5 (4–3)	Conte Forum (8,188); Chestnut Hill, MA
February 4; 9:00 p.m., RSN		Maryland	L 71–67	16–6 (4–4)	Donald L. Tucker Center (9,228); Tallahassee, FL
February 6; 8:00 p.m., ESPNU		Miami (FL)	W 71–65	17–6 (5–4)	Donald L. Tucker Center (11,115); Tallahassee, FL
February 10; 7:00 p.m., ESPN2		at Clemson	L 77–67	17–7 (5–5)	Littlejohn Coliseum (10,000); Clemson, SC
February 14; 7:30 p.m., FSN		Boston College	W 62–47	18–7 (6–5)	Donald L. Tucker Center (7,374); Tallahassee, FL
February 17; 7:00 p.m., ESPNU		at Virginia	W 69–50	19–7 (7–5)	John Paul Jones Arena (10,365); Charlottesville, VA
February 24; 7:00 p.m., ESPN		at North Carolina	W 77–67	20–7 (8–5)	Dean Smith Center (15,779); Chapel Hill, NC
February 28; 5:30 p.m., FSN		Clemson	L 53–50	20–8 (8–6)	Donald L. Tucker Center (9,153); Tallahassee, FL
March 3; 7:00 p.m., ESPN2		Wake Forest	W 51–47	21–8 (9–6)	Donald L. Tucker Center (8,178); Tallahassee, FL
March 6; 12:00 p.m., ESPN2		at Miami (FL)	W 61–60	22–8 (10–6)	BankUnited Center (7,014); Coral Gables, FL
ACC tournament
March 12; 9:45 p.m., ESPN	(3)	vs. (11) NC State; Quarterfinals	L 58–52	22–9	Greensboro Coliseum (23,318); Greensboro, NC
NCAA tournament
March 19*; 7:10 p.m., CBS	(9 W)	vs. (8 W) No. 22 Gonzaga; First round	L 67–60	22–10	HSBC Arena (18,948); Buffalo, NY
*Non-conference game. ^{#}Rankings from AP Poll. (#) Tournament seedings in parentheses.
