= 2009–10 Duke Blue Devils men's basketball team =

American college basketball season

2009–10 Duke Blue Devils men's basketball

NCAA tournament National Champions ACC tournament champions ACC regular season co-champions NIT Season Tip-Off champions

National Championship Game, W 61–59 vs. Butler
- Conference: Atlantic Coast Conference

Ranking
- Coaches: No. 1
- AP: No. 3
- Record: 35–5 (13–3 ACC)
- Head coach: Mike Krzyzewski (30th season)
- Assistant coaches: Chris Collins; Steve Wojciechowski; Nate James
- Home arena: Cameron Indoor Stadium

2009–10 ACC men's basketball standings
	Conf.				Overall
Team	W		L	PCT	W		L	PCT
No. 3 Duke †	13	–	3	.813	35	–	5	.875
No. 20 Maryland	13	–	3	.813	24	–	9	.727
Florida State	10	–	6	.625	22	–	10	.688
Virginia Tech	10	–	6	.625	25	–	9	.735
Wake Forest	9	–	7	.563	20	–	10	.667
Clemson	9	–	7	.563	21	–	11	.656
Georgia Tech	7	–	9	.438	23	–	13	.639
Boston College	6	–	10	.375	15	–	16	.484
Virginia	5	–	11	.313	15	–	16	.484
North Carolina	5	–	11	.313	20	–	17	.541
NC State	5	–	11	.313	20	–	16	.556
Miami (FL)	4	–	12	.250	20	–	13	.606
† 2010 ACC tournament winner As of March 19, 2010; Rankings from AP Poll

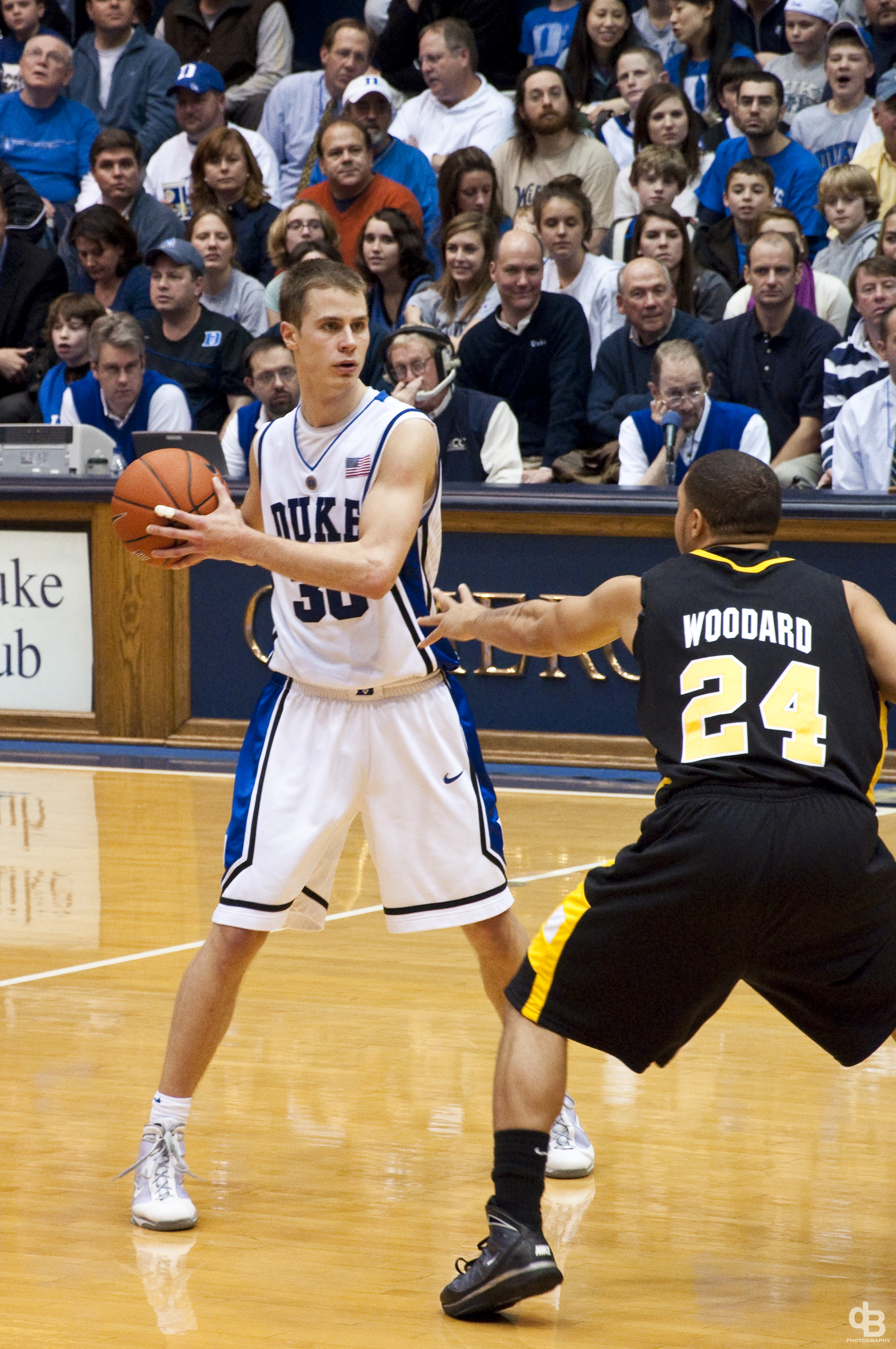
Jon Scheyer against Long Beach state

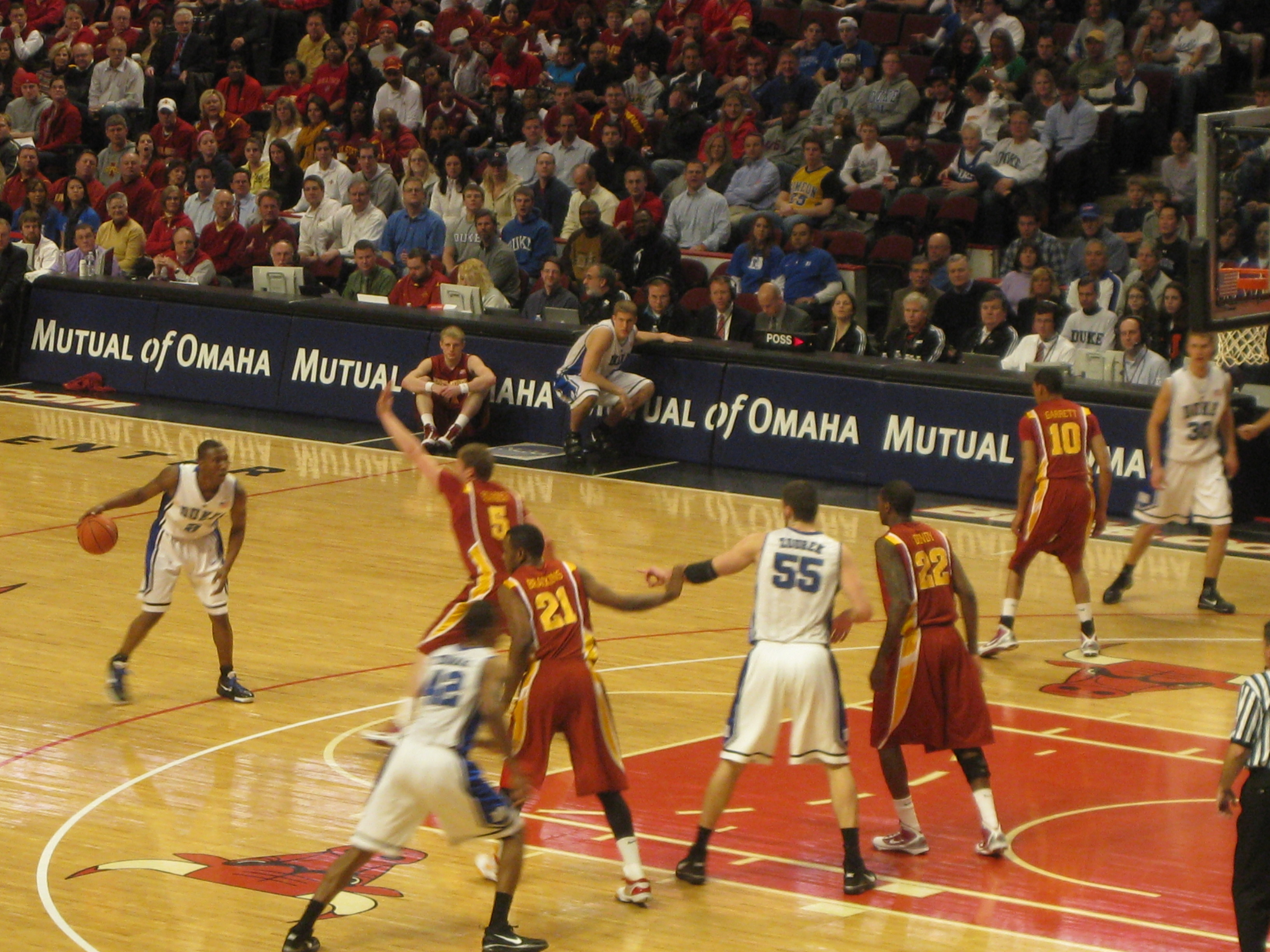
Duke defeated Iowa State at the United Center in Chicago.

The 2009–10 Duke Blue Devils men's basketball team represented Duke University in the 2009–10 NCAA Division I men's basketball season. Led by Head Coach Mike Krzyzewski, the Blue Devils won the 2010 NCAA Division I men's basketball tournament, claiming the school's fourth national title.

Duke led the ACC in scoring margin (+16.2), free throw percentage (.761), 3-point field goal percentage (.382), 3-point field goal defense (.278), 3-point field goals made (7.4 per game), rebounding margin (+6.5), and offensive rebound percentage (.410).

All-American point guard Jon Scheyer was the team leader in points per game (18.2), assists (4.9), free throw percentage (.878), and steals per game (1.6), forward Kyle Singler led in 3-point field goal percentage (.399), center Brian Zoubek led in rebounds per game (7.6), and reserve forward Mason Plumlee led in blocks per game (.9).

Individual-game season-highs were Scheyer in points (36), assists (11), and steals (5; twice), Singler in 3-point field goals (8), Zoubek in rebounds (17), and Mason Plumlee and Ryan Kelly in blocks (4).

Scheyer, Singler, and Nolan Smith each scored over 600 points during the season. In 2001–02, Jason Williams, Carlos Boozer, and Mike Dunleavy Jr. were the first trio to accomplish that feat for Duke. Scheyer (728) and Singler (707) both scored over 700 points, a feat previously accomplished by Jason Williams (841) and Shane Battier (778) in 2001.

Coach K said:

"I've said throughout the year they were good, then they were really good, then they were really good with great character. But I told them [after the championship game] before we said a prayer, that: 'You are a great team.'"

== Pre-season ==
=== Recruiting ===
College recruiting
Name	Hometown	School	Height	Weight	Commit date
Mason Plumlee; C	Warsaw, IN	Christ School (NC)	6 ft 11 in (2.11 m)	220 lb (100 kg)	Feb 27, 2008
Mason Plumlee; C	Recruit ratings: Scout: Rivals: (98)				
Andre Dawkins; SG	Chesapeake, VA	Atlantic Shores Christian School	6 ft 5 in (1.96 m)	196 lb (89 kg)	Jun 26, 2008
Andre Dawkins; SG	Recruit ratings: Scout: Rivals: (95)				
Ryan Kelly; PF	Raleigh, NC	Ravenscroft School	6 ft 10 in (2.08 m)	210 lb (95 kg)	Oct 9, 2008
Ryan Kelly; PF	Recruit ratings: Scout: Rivals: (97)				
Overall recruit ranking:
Note: In many cases, Scout, Rivals, 247Sports, On3, and ESPN may conflict in their listings of height and weight.; In these cases, the average was taken. ESPN grades are on a 100-point scale.; Sources: "Duke Basketball Commitments". Rivals.; "2009 Duke Basketball Commits". Scout.; "ESPN". ESPN.; "Scout.com Team Recruiting Rankings". Scout.; "2009 Team Ranking". Rivals.

== Roster ==
2009–10 Duke Blue Devils men's basketball team
Players
Coaches

Pos.	#	Name	Height	Weight	Year	Previous school	Hometown
G	3	Seth Curry (I)	6 ft 1 in (1.85 m)	175 lb (79 kg)	So	Charlotte Christian School	Charlotte, NC
F	13	Olek Czyz (TO)	6 ft 7 in (2.01 m)	240 lb (109 kg)	So	Reno	Reno, NV
G	41	Jordan Davidson (W)	6 ft 1 in (1.85 m)	180 lb (82 kg)		Blair Academy	Melbourne, AR
G	20	Andre Dawkins	6 ft 4 in (1.93 m)	190 lb (86 kg)	Fr	Atlantic Shores Christian	Chesapeake, VA
F	51	Steve Johnson (W)	6 ft 5 in (1.96 m)	210 lb (95 kg)	Jr	Cheyenne Mountain	Colorado Springs, CO
F	34	Ryan Kelly	6 ft 10 in (2.08 m)	220 lb (100 kg)	Fr	Ravenscroft	Raleigh, NC
G	53	Casey Peters (W)	6 ft 4 in (1.93 m)	185 lb (84 kg)	Jr	Red Bank Regional	Red Bank, NJ
F	5	Mason Plumlee	6 ft 10 in (2.08 m)	230 lb (104 kg)	Fr	Christ School	Warsaw, IN
F	21	Miles Plumlee	6 ft 10 in (2.08 m)	240 lb (109 kg)	So	Christ School	Warsaw, IN
G	30	Jon Scheyer	6 ft 5 in (1.96 m)	190 lb (86 kg)	Sr	Glenbrook North	Northbrook, IL
F	12	Kyle Singler	6 ft 8 in (2.03 m)	230 lb (104 kg)	Jr	South Medford	Medford, OR
G	2	Nolan Smith	6 ft 2 in (1.88 m)	185 lb (84 kg)	Jr	Oak Hill Academy (VA)	Upper Marlboro, MD
F	42	Lance Thomas	6 ft 8 in (2.03 m)	225 lb (102 kg)	Sr	St. Benedict's Prep	Scotch Plains, NJ
F	52	Todd Zafirovski (W)	6 ft 8 in (2.03 m)	240 lb (109 kg)	Fr	Lake Forest Academy	Lake Forest, IL
C	55	Brian Zoubek	7 ft 1 in (2.16 m)	260 lb (118 kg)	Sr	Haddonfield Memorial	Haddonfield, NJ

Head coach

Mike Krzyzewski

Assistant coach(es)

Chris Collins
Steve Wojciechowski
Nate James

Legend

- (C) Team captain
- (S) Suspended
- (I) Ineligible
- (W) Walk-on
- (TO) Transfer out
- Injured
- Current redshirt

- Curry transferred from Liberty University before the season and thus was ineligible to play during the 2009–10 season, per NCAA rules.
- Czyz transferred to the University of Nevada, Reno in mid-season.

== Rankings ==
Ranking movement Legend: Improvement in ranking. Decrease in ranking. Not ranked the previous week. rv=Others receiving votes.
Poll	Pre	Wk 1	Wk 2	Wk 3	Wk 4	Wk 5	Wk 6	Wk 7	Wk 8	Wk 9	Wk 10	Wk 11	Wk 12	Wk 13	Wk 14	Wk 15	Wk 16	Wk 17	Wk 18	Final
AP	9	9	7	6	8	7	7	7	5	8	7	8	10T	8	6	5	4	4	3	1
Coaches	8	8	7	5	8	7	7	7	5	7	6	7	9	7	6	5	4	4	3	1

== Schedule ==
Date time, TV	Rank^{#}	Opponent^{#}	Result	Record	High points	High rebounds	High assists	Site (attendance) city, state
Fri, Oct 16; 7:30 pm, Cable 13		Blue-White Scrimmage						Cameron Indoor Stadium; Durham, NC
Exhibition
Sat, Oct 24*; 6:30 pm, Cable 13		Pfeiffer	W 128–70		–	–	–	Cameron Indoor Stadium; Durham, NC
Tue, Nov 3*; 7:00 pm, Cable 13	No. 9	Findlay	W 84–48		–	–	–	Cameron Indoor Stadium; Durham, NC
Regular season
Fri, Nov 13*; 7:00 pm, FSS	No. 9	UNC Greensboro	W 96–62	1–0	20 – Singler	9 – Mi. Plumlee	4 – Scheyer	Cameron Indoor Stadium (9,314); Durham, NC
Mon, Nov 16*; 7:00 pm, ESPNU	No. 9	Coastal Carolina; NIT Tip-Off First Round	W 74–49	2–0	23 – Singler	11 – Singler	5 – Scheyer	Cameron Indoor Stadium (9,314); Durham, NC
Tue, Nov 17*; 6:00 pm, ESPN2	No. 9	UNC Charlotte; NIT Tip-Off Second Round	W 101–59	3–0	24 – Smith	13 – Zoubek	5 – Tied	Cameron Indoor Stadium (9,314); Durham, NC
Sat, Nov 21*; 3:00 pm, ACC Network	No. 9	Radford	W 104–67	4–0	20 – Tied	11 – Mi. Plumlee	7 – Tied	Cameron Indoor Stadium (9,314); Durham, NC
Wed, Nov 25*; 7:00 pm, ESPN2	No. 7	vs. Arizona State; NIT Tip-Off Semi-Final	W 64–53	5–0	16 – Scheyer	8 – Singler	6 – Scheyer	Madison Square Garden (8,756); New York, NY
Fri, Nov 27*; 5:00 pm, ESPN	No. 7	vs. No. 13 Connecticut; NIT Tip-Off Final	W 68–59	6–0	19 – Scheyer	11 – Tied	5 – Scheyer	Madison Square Garden (13,179); New York, NY
Wed, Dec 2*; 9:15 pm, ESPN	No. 6	at Wisconsin; ACC – Big Ten Challenge	L 69–73	6–1	28 – Singler	6 – Tied	4 – Scheyer	Kohl Center (17,230); Madison, WI
Sat, Dec 5*; 3:30 pm, ESPN2	No. 6	St. John's	W 80–71	7–1	17 – Singler	8 – Tied	6 – Scheyer	Cameron Indoor Stadium (9,314); Durham, NC
Tue, Dec 15*; 7:00 pm, ESPN2	No. 7	Gardner–Webb	W 113–68	8–1	36 – Scheyer	8 – Tied	9 – Scheyer	Cameron Indoor Stadium (9,314); Durham, NC
Sat, Dec 19*; 4:00 pm, CBS	No. 7	vs. No. 15 Gonzaga	W 76–41	9–1	24 – Smith	11 – Singler	8 – Scheyer	Madison Square Garden (14,554); New York, NY
Tue, Dec 29*; 7:00 pm, FSS	No. 7	Long Beach State	W 84–63	10–1	22 – Scheyer	12 – Zoubek	7 – Tied	Cameron Indoor Stadium (9,314); Durham, NC
Thu, Dec 31*; 6:00 pm, ESPN2	No. 7	Pennsylvania	W 114–55	11–1	23 – Smith	10 – Mi. Plumlee	11 – Scheyer	Cameron Indoor Stadium (9,314); Durham, NC
Sun, Jan 3; 7:45 pm, FSN	No. 7	No. 18 Clemson	W 74–53	12–1 (1–0)	22 – Tied	8 – Singler	6 – Scheyer	Cameron Indoor Stadium (9,314); Durham, NC
Wed, Jan 6*; 10:00 pm, ESPN2	No. 5	vs. Iowa State	W 86–65	13–1	31 – Scheyer	8 – Singler	4 – Tied	United Center (10,067); Chicago, IL
Sat, Jan 9; 2:00 pm, ESPN	No. 5	at No. 20 Georgia Tech	L 67–71	13–2 (1–1)	25 – Scheyer	6 – Ma. Plumlee	6 – Scheyer	Alexander Memorial Coliseum (9,191); Atlanta, GA
Wed, Jan 13; 7:00 pm, ESPN	No. 8	Boston College	W 79–59	14–2 (2–1)	24 – Smith	11 – Zoubek	4 – Tied	Cameron Indoor Stadium (9,314); Durham, NC
Sun, Jan 17; 8:00 pm, FSN	No. 8	Wake Forest	W 90–70	15–2 (3–1)	21 – Singler	15 – Singler	6 – Scheyer	Cameron Indoor Stadium (9,314); Durham, NC
Wed, Jan 20; 9:00 pm, Raycom	No. 7	at NC State	L 74–88	15–3 (3–2)	22 – Singler	12 – Thomas	2 – Tied	RBC Center (18,925); Raleigh, NC
Sat, Jan 23; 9:00 pm, ESPN	No. 7	at No. 17 Clemson; ESPN College GameDay	W 60–47	16–3 (4–2)	22 – Smith	8 – Mi. Plumlee	3 – Scheyer	Littlejohn Coliseum (10,000); Clemson, SC
Wed, Jan 27; 9:00 pm, ESPN	No. 8	Florida State	W 70–56	17–3 (5–2)	22 – Scheyer	7 – Singler	5 – Scheyer	Cameron Indoor Stadium (9,314); Durham, NC
Sat, Jan 30*; 1:00 pm, CBS	No. 8	at No. 7 Georgetown	L 77–89	17–4	19 – Smith	6 – Singler	5 – Scheyer	Verizon Center (20,039); Washington, DC
Thu, Feb 4; 7:00 pm, ESPN2	No. 10	No. 21 Georgia Tech	W 86–67	18–4 (6–2)	30 – Singler	11 – Thomas	7 – Scheyer	Cameron Indoor Stadium (9,314); Durham, NC
Sat, Feb 6; 2:00 pm, ESPN	No. 10	at Boston College	W 66–63	19–4 (7–2)	21 – Tied	6 – Tied	4 – Tied	Conte Forum (8,606); Chestnut Hill, MA
Wed, Feb 10; 9:00 pm, ESPN/Raycom	No. 8	at North Carolina; Carolina–Duke rivalry	W 64–54	20–4 (8–2)	24 – Scheyer	9 – Tied	4 – Scheyer	Dean Smith Center (21,750); Chapel Hill, NC
Sat, Feb 13; 1:00 pm, CBS	No. 8	Maryland; Duke–Maryland rivalry	W 77–56	21–4 (9–2)	22 – Scheyer	17 – Zoubek	6 – Smith	Cameron Indoor Stadium (9,314); Durham, NC
Wed, Feb 17; 7:00 pm, ESPN	No. 6	at Miami	W 81–74	22–4 (10–2)	22 – Singler	11 – Singler	6 – Scheyer	BankUnited Center (6,860); Coral Gables, FL
Sun, Feb 21; 7:45 pm, FSN	No. 6	Virginia Tech	W 67–55	23–4 (11–2)	25 – Singler	16 – Zoubek	7 – Scheyer	Cameron Indoor Stadium (9,314); Durham, NC
Thu, Feb 25*; 7:00 pm, ESPN	No. 5	Tulsa	W 70–52	24–4	18 – Smith	11 – Zoubek	3 – Scheyer	Cameron Indoor Stadium (9,314); Durham, NC
Sun, Feb 28; 7:45 pm, FSN	No. 5	at Virginia	W 67–49	25–4 (12–2)	21 – Singler	5 – Mi. Plumlee	3 – Tied	John Paul Jones Arena (13,663); Charlottesville, VA
Wed, Mar 3; 9:00 pm, ESPN	No. 4	at No. 22 Maryland; Duke–Maryland rivalry	L 72–79	25–5 (12–3)	20 – Smith	13 – Zoubek	3 – Smith	Comcast Center (17,950); College Park, MD
Sat, Mar 6; 9:00 pm, ESPN	No. 4	North Carolina; ESPN College GameDay	W 82–50	26–5 (13–3)	25 – Singler	13 – Zoubek	7 – Scheyer	Cameron Indoor Stadium (9,314); Durham, NC
ACC Tournament
Fri, Mar 12; 12:00 pm, ESPN/Raycom	(1) No. 4	vs. (9) Virginia; Quarterfinals	W 57–46	27–5	18 – Singler	11 – Singler	3 – Scheyer	Greensboro Coliseum (23,381); Greensboro, NC
Sat, Mar 13; 1:30 pm, ESPN/Raycom	(1) No. 4	vs. (12) Miami; Semifinals	W 77–74	28–5	27 – Singler	8 – Singler	6 – Singler	Greensboro Coliseum (23,381); Greensboro, NC
Sun, Mar 14; 1:00 pm, ESPN/Raycom	(1) No. 4	vs. (7) Georgia Tech; Final	W 65–61	29–5	20 – Singler	9 – Zoubek	2 – Tied	Greensboro Coliseum (23,381); Greensboro, NC
NCAA tournament
Fri, March 19*; 7:25 pm, CBS	(1 S) No. 3	vs. (16 S) Arkansas–Pine Bluff; First round	W 73–44	30–5	22 – Singler	10 – Singler	5 – Smith	Jacksonville Veterans Memorial Arena (12,251); Jacksonville, FL
Sun, March 21*; 5:15 pm, CBS	(1 S) No. 3	vs. (8 S) California; Second round	W 68–53	31–5	20 – Smith	13 – Zoubek	3 – Tied	Jacksonville Veterans Memorial Arena (12,547); Jacksonville, FL
Fri, March 26*; 9:53 pm, CBS	(1 S) No. 3	vs. (4 S) No. 10 Purdue; Sweet Sixteen	W 70–57	32–5	24 – Singler	14 – Zoubek	4 – Tied	Reliant Stadium (45,505); Houston, TX
Sun, March 28*; 5:05 pm, CBS	(1 S) No. 3	vs. (3 S) No. 19 Baylor; Elite Eight	W 78–71	33–5	29 – Smith	9 – Tied	4 – Tied	Reliant Stadium (47,492); Houston, TX
Sat, April 3*; 9:14 pm, CBS	(1 S) No. 3	vs. (2 E) No. 6 West Virginia; Final Four	W 78–57	34–5	23 – Scheyer	10 – Zoubek	6 – Tied	Lucas Oil Stadium (71,298); Indianapolis, IN
Mon, April 5*; 9:21 pm, CBS	(1 S) No. 3	vs. (5 W) No. 8 Butler; National Championship Game	W 61–59	35–5	19 – Singler	10 – Zoubek	5 – Scheyer	Lucas Oil Stadium (70,930); Indianapolis, IN
*Non-conference game. ^{#}Rankings from AP. (#) Tournament seedings in parentheses. All times are in Eastern Time. SR=South Region, ER=East Region, WR=West Region.

== Accomplishments ==
- 17–0 at home
- 13–0 on neutral courts
- NIT Season Tip-Off Champions
- ACC regular season co-champions
- ACC Tournament Champions, two in a row and 9 out of the last 12
- 15th consecutive NCAA tournament
- NCAA Champions, fourth in school history
- National Titles in three straight decades
- Mike Krzyzewski ties Adolph Rupp of Kentucky for second most NCAA titles by a Division I head coach
- Played in national championship game 4 of the last 12 seasons
- 15th Final Four appearance and 10th out of the last 23 years
- 35 victories is tied for third most in Duke history
- 65 victories the past two seasons, most in the NCAA

== Team highs ==
- Most Points Scored: 114 vs. Pennsylvania, 12/31
- Highest Point Differential: 59 vs. Pennsylvania, 12/31
- Most Field Goals Made: 43 vs. Gardner-Webb, 12/15
- Most Three Point Field Goals: 18 vs Radford, 11/21
- Most Rebounds: 56 vs. University of Connecticut, 11/27
- Most Assists: 27 vs. Gardner-Webb, 12/15
- Highest Assist-to-Turnover Ratio: 3.33 vs. West Virginia, 4/3 (Elite Eight; 20 assists to 6 turnovers)
- Most Blocks: 10 vs. Long Beach State, 12/29

== Individual season highs ==
- Most Points: 36, Jon Scheyer vs. Gardner-Webb, 12/15
- Most Offensive Rebounds: 8, Brian Zoubek three times and Lance Thomas vs. Baylor (3/28)
- Most Defensive Rebounds: 10, Miles Plumlee vs. Charlotte (11/17) and Brian Zoubek vs. Purdue (3/26)
- Most Three-Point Field Goals: 8, Kyle Singler vs. Georgia Tech, 2/4
- Most Assists: 11, Jon Scheyer vs. Pennsylvania, 12/31
- Most Steals: 5, Jon Scheyer three times, Brian Zoubek at Miami
- Most Blocks: 4, Ryan Kelly vs. Gonzaga (12/19) and Mason Plumlee vs. Long Beach State (12/29)

== ACC season leaders ==
- Scheyer set the ACC all-time single-season record for minutes played (1,470).
- Scheyer led the ACC in assist/turnover ratio (3.0; 2nd-best in Duke history), free throw percentage (.878; 7th-best in Duke history), and 3-point FGs made (2.8 per game).

== Individual honors ==
- Jon Scheyer was a 2009–10 consensus All-American (Second Team), a Wooden and Lowe's Senior First Team All-American, and was named to the Associated Press, USBWA, National Association of Basketball Coaches (NABC), and Sporting News All-America second teams.
- Scheyer was also an ACC All-Tournament First Team pick and an NCAA South All-Regional and All-Final Four Team selection, was named to the NABC and USBWA 2009–10 All-District teams, and was given the NABC Senior Achievement Award.
- Kyle Singler made the Sporting News All-America fifth team.
- Singler was voted the Final Four Most Outstanding Player. Scheyer and Nolan Smith were named to the All-Final Four Team.
- Scheyer (unanimous) and Singler were first team All-ACC.
- Nolan Smith was second team All-ACC.
- Lance Thomas named to ACC All-Defensive Team
- Brian Zoubek and Ryan Kelly named to ACC All-Academic Team

== Local radio ==
Flagship station	Play-by-play announcer	Color analyst(s)
WDNC	Bob Harris	John Roth

== See also ==
- 2009–10 Duke Blue Devils women's basketball team
