= 2009–10 Boston College Eagles men's basketball team =

American college basketball season

2009–10 Boston College Eagles men's basketball
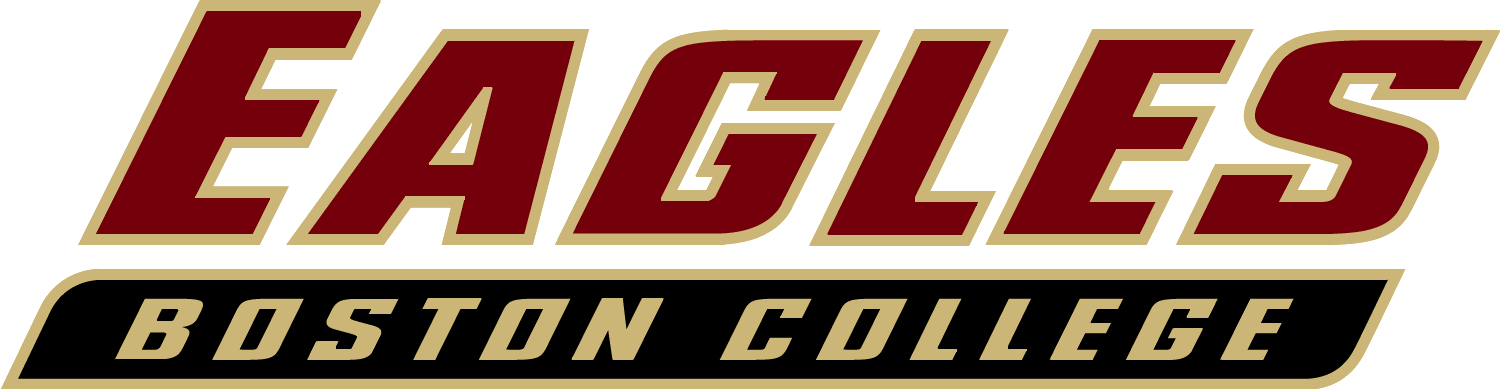
- Conference: Atlantic Coast Conference
- Record: 15–16 (6–10 ACC)
- Head coach: Al Skinner (13th season)
- Assistant coaches: Pat Duquette (13th season); Bonzie Colson (9th season); Mo Cassara (4th season)
- Home arena: Conte Forum

2009–10 ACC men's basketball standings
	Conf.				Overall
Team	W		L	PCT	W		L	PCT
No. 3 Duke †	13	–	3	.813	35	–	5	.875
No. 20 Maryland	13	–	3	.813	24	–	9	.727
Florida State	10	–	6	.625	22	–	10	.688
Virginia Tech	10	–	6	.625	25	–	9	.735
Wake Forest	9	–	7	.563	20	–	10	.667
Clemson	9	–	7	.563	21	–	11	.656
Georgia Tech	7	–	9	.438	23	–	13	.639
Boston College	6	–	10	.375	15	–	16	.484
Virginia	5	–	11	.313	15	–	16	.484
North Carolina	5	–	11	.313	20	–	17	.541
NC State	5	–	11	.313	20	–	16	.556
Miami (FL)	4	–	12	.250	20	–	13	.606
† 2010 ACC tournament winner As of March 19, 2010; Rankings from AP Poll

The 2009–10 Boston College Eagles men's basketball team represented Boston College during the 2009–10 NCAA Division I men's basketball season. The Eagles, led by 13th-year head coach Al Skinner, played their home games at the Conte Forum and were members of the Atlantic Coast Conference. They finished the season 15–16 and 6–10 in ACC play to finish in eighth place. They lost to Virginia in the first round of the ACC Basketball tournament. Following the conclusion of the season, Boston College fired Skinner.

== Previous season ==
The Eagles finished the 2008–09 season 22–12 overall, 9–7 in ACC play. After losing to Duke in the quarterfinals of the ACC tournament, the Eagles were invited to the NCAA tournament where, as the seven seed, they lost to the ten seed USC in the round of 64.

== Roster ==
2009–10 Boston College Eagles men's basketball team
Players
Coaches

Pos.	#	Name	Height	Weight	Year	Hometown
G	0	Reggie Jackson	6 ft 3 in (1.91 m)	208 lb (94 kg)	So	Colorado Springs, Colorado
G	5	Biko Paris	6 ft 1 in (1.85 m)	194 lb (88 kg)	Jr	New Orleans, Louisiana
F	11	Corey Raji	6 ft 6 in (1.98 m)	218 lb (99 kg)	Jr	Washington Township, New Jersey
F	12	Joe Trapani	6 ft 8 in (2.03 m)	232 lb (105 kg)	Jr	Madison, Connecticut
G	14	Nick Mosakowski	6 ft 1 in (1.85 m)	187 lb (85 kg)	Jr	Swampscott, Massachusetts
F	21	Tyler Roche	6 ft 7 in (2.01 m)	218 lb (99 kg)	Sr	Hooksett, New Hampshire
F	21	Rakim Sanders	6 ft 5 in (1.96 m)	210 lb (95 kg)	Jr	Pawtucket, Rhode Island
G	25	Peter Rehnquist	6 ft 4 in (1.93 m)	220 lb (100 kg)	So	Sharon, Massachusetts
G	30	Dallas Elmore	6 ft 5 in (1.96 m)	210 lb (95 kg)	So	Fort Collins, Colorado
F	30	Evan Ravenel	6 ft 8 in (2.03 m)	250 lb (113 kg)	So	Tampa, Florida
C	52	Josh Southern	6 ft 5 in (1.96 m)	210 lb (95 kg)	Jr	Saginaw, Michigan
F	55	Cortney Dunn	6 ft 8 in (2.03 m)	238 lb (108 kg)	Jr	Dallas, Texas

Head coach

- Al Skinner (UMass)

Assistant coach(es)

- Pat Duquette (Williams)
- Bonzie Colson (Rhode Island)
- Mo Cassara (St. Lawrence)

Legend

- (C) Team captain
- (S) Suspended
- (I) Ineligible
- (W) Walk-on
- Injured
- Current redshirt

Roster
Last update: 2010-09-25

== Schedule ==
Date time, TV	Rank^{#}	Opponent^{#}	Result	Record	High points	High rebounds	High assists	Site (attendance) city, state
Regular season
November 13, 2009*; 7:00 pm		Dartmouth	W 89–58	1–0	30 – Roche	6 – Tied	7 – Paris	Conte Forum; Chestnut Hill, MA
November 17, 2009*; 7:00 pm		St. Francis	W 72–44	2–0	19 – Roche	9 – Trapani	7 – Tied	Conte Forum (2,882); Chestnut Hill, MA
November 20, 2010*; 6:00 pm		vs. Saint Joseph; Paradise Jam	L 80–84	2–1	20 – Trapani	11 – Jackson	4 – Tied	Sports and Fitness Center; Saint Thomas, VI
November 21, 2010*; 6:00 pm		vs. South Dakota State; Paradise Jam	W 75–58	3–1	21 – Trapani	7 – Tied	6 – Jackson	Sports and Fitness Center; Saint Thomas, VI
November 23, 2010*; 3:30 pm		vs. Northern Iowa; Paradise Jam	L 69–81	3–2	18 – Raji	7 – Trapani	4 – Tied	Sports and Fitness Center (531); Saint Thomas, VI
November 28, 2009*; 7:00 pm		at Providence	W 82–77	4–2	20 – Jackson	12 – Jackson	7 – Jackson	Dunkin Donuts Center (10,782); Providence, RI
December 2, 2009*; 7:00 pm		at Michigan; ACC/Big Ten Challenge	W 62–58	5–2	24 – Raji	12 – Trapani	6 – Jackson	Crisler Center (10,718); Ann Arbor, MI
December 6, 2009; 3:00 pm		Miami	W 61–60	6–2 (1–0)	18 – Jackson	9 – Tied	7 – Paris	Conte Forum; Chestnut Hill, MA
December 9, 2009*; 7:00 pm		Harvard	L 67–74	6–3	21 – Trapani	11 – Raji	6 – Paris	Conte Forum; Chestnut Hill, MA
December 13, 2010*; 6:45 pm		Rhode Island	L 69–80	6–4	14 – Sanders	11 – Raji	7 – Paris	Conte Forum (4,263); Chestnut Hill, MA
December 20, 2009*; 4:00 pm		Bryant	W 72–46	7–4	21 – Trapani	10 – Trapani	6 – Paris	Conte Forum (6,519); Chestnut Hill, MA
December 23, 2009*; 7:00 pm		UMass	W 79–67	8–4	18 – Tied	8 – Jackson	8 – Sanders	Conte Forum (6,519); Chestnut Hill, MA
December 30, 2009*; 9:00 pm		South Carolina	W 85–76	9–4	22 – Sanders	8 – Jackson	6 – Paris	Conte Forum (6,846); Chestnut Hill, MA
January 2, 2010*; 12:00 pm		Maine	L 51–52	9–5	17 – Trapani	8 – Tied	4 – Tied	Conte Forum; Chestnut Hill, MA
January 5, 2010*; 7:00 pm		NJIT	W 89–32	10–5	21 – Sanders	8 – Trapani	7 – Paris	Conte Forum; Chestnut Hill, MA
January 10, 2010; 4:00 pm		at Clemson	L 56–72	10–6 (1–1)	13 – Trapani	6 – Tied	3 – Tied	Littlejohn Coliseum (10,000); Clemson, SC
January 13, 2010; 7:00 pm		at No. 8 Duke	L 59–79	10–7 (1–2)	20 – Jackson	4 – Trapani	3 – Sanders	Cameron Indoor Stadium (9,314); Durham, NC
January 16, 2010; 4:00 pm		Maryland	L 57–73	10–8 (1–3)	14 – Raji	9 – Trapani	5 – Jackson	Conte Forum (8,606); Chestnut Hill, MA
January 19, 2010; 9:00 pm		at Miami	W 79–75	11–8 (2–3)	31 – Trapani	6 – Trapani	4 – Jackson	BankUnited Center; Miami, FL
January 23, 2010; 1:30 pm		at Virginia Tech	L 62–63	11–9 (2–4)	15 – Jackson	7 – Jackson	4 – Paris	Cassell Coliseum (9,847); Blacksburg, VA
January 26, 2010; 7:00 pm		Clemson	W 75–69	12–9 (3–4)	18 – Jackson	5 – Tied	7 – Jackson	Conte Forum (6,238); Chestnut Hill, MA
January 30, 2010; 3:00 pm		Florida State	L 57–61	12–10 (3–5)	17 – Sanders	7 – Trapani	5 – Tied	Conte Forum (8,188); Chestnut Hill, MA
February 6, 2010; 2:00 pm		No. 10 Duke	L 63–66	12–11 (3–6)	15 – Raji	8 – Raji	4 – Paris	Conte Forum (8,606); Chestnut Hill, MA
February 9, 2010; 7:00 pm		at Wake Forest	L 85–92	12–12 (3–7)	31 – Roche	10 – Raji	3 – Tied	Lawrence Joel Veterans Memorial Coliseum; Winston-Salem, NC
February 14, 2010; 7:30 pm		at Florida State	L 47–62	12–13 (3–8)	17 – Trapani	7 – Trapani	3 – Tied	Donald L. Tucker Center (7,734); Tallahassee, FL
February 20, 2010; 12:00 pm		North Carolina	W 71–67	13–13 (4–8)	17 – Jackson	9 – Trapani	7 – Jackson	Conte Forum (8,128); Chestnut Hill, MA
February 24, 2010; 7:00 pm		Virginia Tech	W 80–60	14–13 (5–8)	17 – Trapani	9 – Sanders	11 – Jackson	Conte Forum (4,362); Chestnut Hill, MA
February 27, 2010; 12:00 pm		at Georgia Tech	L 68–73	14–14 (5–9)	26 – Trapani	6 – Trapani	10 – Jackson	Alexander Memorial Coliseum (8,055); Atlanta, GA
March 3, 2010; 9:00 pm		Virginia	W 68–55	15–14 (6–9)	18 – Raji	9 – Raji	4 – Jackson	Conte Forum (3,968); Chestnut Hill, MA
March 7, 2010; 2:00 pm		at NC State	L 57–66	15–15 (6–10)	11 – Tied	5 – Sanders	5 – Sanders	RBC Center (15,104); Raleigh, NC
ACC tournament
March 11, 2011*; 12:00 pm	(8)	vs. (9) Virginia; ACC First Round	L 62–68	15–16	22 – Sanders	5 – Trapani	3 – Tied	Greensboro Coliseum; Greensboro, NC
*Non-conference game. ^{#}Rankings from AP Poll. (#) Tournament seedings in parentheses. All times are in Eastern Time.
