= 2009–10 Clemson Tigers men's basketball team =

American college basketball season

2009–10 Clemson Tigers men's basketball

NCAA tournament, First Round
- Conference: Atlantic Coast Conference
- Record: 21–11 (9–7 ACC)
- Head coach: Oliver Purnell (7th season)
- Assistant coaches: Ron Bradley; Frank Smith; Josh Postorino
- Home arena: Littlejohn Coliseum

2009–10 ACC men's basketball standings
	Conf.				Overall
Team	W		L	PCT	W		L	PCT
No. 3 Duke †	13	–	3	.813	35	–	5	.875
No. 20 Maryland	13	–	3	.813	24	–	9	.727
Florida State	10	–	6	.625	22	–	10	.688
Virginia Tech	10	–	6	.625	25	–	9	.735
Wake Forest	9	–	7	.563	20	–	10	.667
Clemson	9	–	7	.563	21	–	11	.656
Georgia Tech	7	–	9	.438	23	–	13	.639
Boston College	6	–	10	.375	15	–	16	.484
Virginia	5	–	11	.313	15	–	16	.484
North Carolina	5	–	11	.313	20	–	17	.541
NC State	5	–	11	.313	20	–	16	.556
Miami (FL)	4	–	12	.250	20	–	13	.606
† 2010 ACC tournament winner As of March 19, 2010; Rankings from AP Poll

The 2009–10 Clemson Tigers men's basketball team represented Clemson University in the 2009–10 college basketball season. Their head coach was Oliver Purnell. The team played its home games at Littlejohn Coliseum in Clemson, South Carolina and are members of the Atlantic Coast Conference. All games were produced and broadcast locally by the Clemson Tigers Sports Network. The Tigers finished the season 21–11, 9–7 in ACC play. They lost in the first round of the 2010 ACC men's basketball tournament. They received an at-large bid to the 2010 NCAA Division I men's basketball tournament, earning a 7 seed in the East Region, where they lost to Missouri in the first round.

== Pre-season ==
On Wednesday, May 27, guard Terrence Oglesby announced he would forgo his final two seasons at the school to pursue a professional basketball career. Oglesby appeared in 66 games and scored 777 points in his two seasons at Clemson. Previously, Oglesby played for Norway at the International Basketball Federation (FIBA) FIBA Europe Under-20 Championship. In a press release issued by Clemson University, Oglesby indicated that his time spent playing internationally helped fuel his decision to turn pro. Oglesby's departure left an open roster spot which was filled by the commitment of shooting guard Noel Johnson, a former USC commitment.

On Tuesday, August 18, ESPN announced that Clemson will serve as one of the host sites for the network's popular basketball series, College GameDay, during the 2009–10 NCAA Division I men's basketball season. Two one-hour shows (11:00 am and 8:00 pm Eastern) will originate from Littlejohn Coliseum on Jan 23, 2010 for the Clemson vs. Duke game. This is Clemson's first appearance on ESPN College GameDay. The series, which is in its sixth season, will make four first-time stops in 2010. Other first-time hosts include Illinois, Kansas State and Washington. The Clemson/Duke game will be one of two ACC tilts featured this season, with the other being North Carolina at Duke on Mar. 6.

On Sunday, October 26, 2008, members of the ACC Media were polled and picked Clemson to finish third in the conference behind North Carolina and Duke.

== Regular season ==
On December 2, 2009, Illinois came back from a 23-point second-half deficit to upset the No. 18 Tigers, 76–74 at Littlejohn Coliseum. The victory was the biggest comeback win in school history and was also notable as it helped the Big Ten win their first ACC – Big Ten Challenge in eleven tries.

On December 6, 2009, Clemson beat rival South Carolina 72–61, extending their winning streak over the Gamecocks to six games. Carolina leads the overall series, 86–74.

On January 3, 2010, the No. 21 Tigers managed only 12 points in the first half as they lost to No. 7 Duke for the 13th straight time at Cameron Indoor Stadium, 74–53. Clemson had as many fouls as points in the opening period, and their scoring total and shooting percentage (5–30, 17%) were the lowest for a half in Oliver Purnell's seven years as head coach.

On January 13, 2010, the No. 19 Tigers ended a 10-game losing streak to North Carolina by defeating the No. 13 Tar Heels, 83–64 at Littlejohn Arena. It was the second largest margin of victory ever for the Tigers over the Tar Heels. The most being a 20-point 93–73 win in 1976–77, Tree Rollins' senior season. Clemson then followed the win with a 73–70 win at NC State, ending a streak of 13 consecutive losses in the game following a victory over a top 25 team.

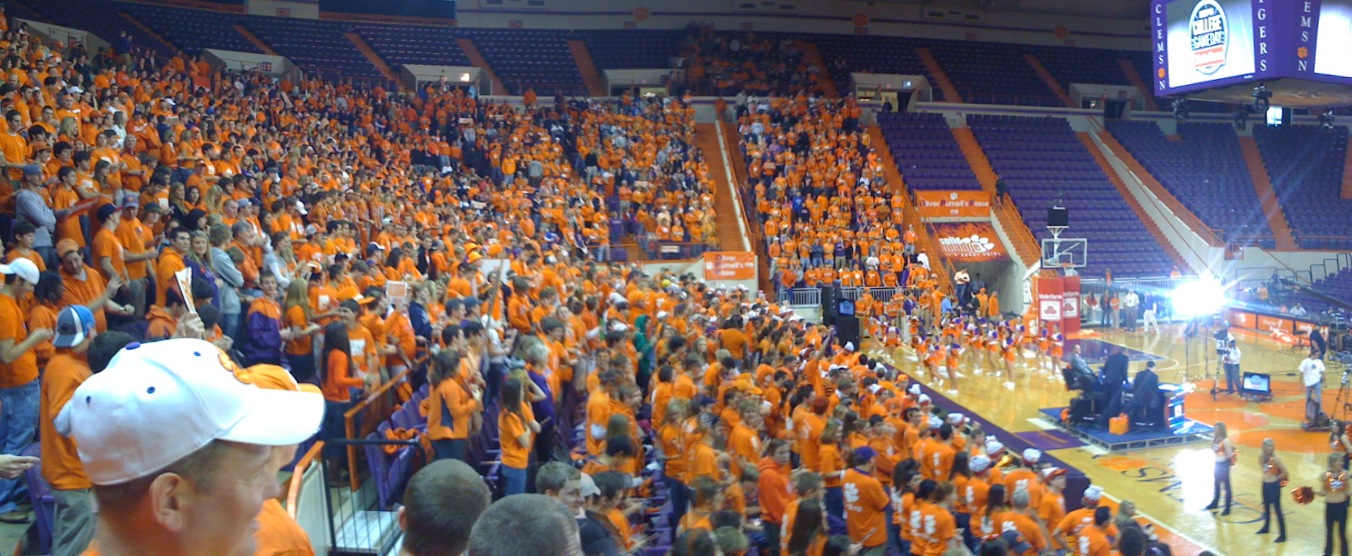
College GameDay live broadcast from Littlejohn Coliseum (Jan 23, 2010)

On January 23, 2010, ESPN's College GameDay broadcast live from Littlejohn Coliseum for the first time. Afterward, GameDay host Digger Phelps said of the broadcast at Clemson: "It was the best". The crowd was so loud during the broadcast that the production director requested that the crowd keep the noise down when cameras were rolling. The day culminated in a 60–47 loss to Duke, the lowest point total for Duke thus far this season, and the lowest point total of a Clemson team at home since the 2003–04 season, Oliver Purnell's first at Clemson.

== Postseason ==
=== ACC tournament ===
Clemson entered the ACC tournament as the No. 6 seed with a 9–7 record in the ACC regular season. The Tigers lost their opening game to No. 11 seed NC State 59–57, dropping their record in the tournament to 16–57 all-time with 43 of their losses coming in the first round. Clemson remains the only original member of the ACC to have never won the tournament.

=== NCAA tournament ===
Clemson entered the tournament as the No. 7 seed in the East Region, but was knocked out in the opening round by a lower-seeded team for the third straight year, losing 86–78 to No. 10 seed Missouri. The loss dropped Oliver Purnell to 0–6 all-time in NCAA Tournament games as a head coach for three different schools.

== Roster ==
=== Coaches & staff ===
Position	Name	Year at CU	Experience	Alma mater	Hometown
Head coach	Oliver Purnell	7th	32	Old Dominion ('75)	Berlin, Maryland, United States
Associate head coach	Ron Bradley	7th	32	Eastern Nazarene ('74)	Springfield, Massachusetts, United States
Assistant head coach	Frank Smith	7th	20	Old Dominion ('88)	Alexandria, Virginia, United States
Assistant coach	Josh Postorino	3rd	9	Dayton ('99)	Clearwater, Florida, United States
Director of Operations	Michael Morrell	2nd	2	Milligan College ('05)	
Video Services	Andy Farrell	2nd	1	Dayton ('07)	Richmond, Virginia, United States
Graduate assistant	Adam Gordon	2nd	1	Tampa ('06)	Ocala, Florida, United States

=== Players ===
No.	Name	Ht.	Wt.	Position	Year	Hometown
03	Anderson, Zavier	5' 09"	160	PG	JR	Mauldin, South Carolina, United States
10	Baciu, Catalin	7' 02"	245	C	SO	Cluj-Napoca, Romania
04	Baize, Jonah	6' 06"	205	SF	JR	Evansville, Indiana, United States
31	Booker, Devin	6' 08"	235	PF	FR	Whitmire, South Carolina, United States
35	Booker, Trevor	6' 07"	240	PF	SR	Whitmire, South Carolina, United States
45	Grant, Jerai	6' 08"	220	PF	JR	Bowie, Maryland, United States
32	Hill, Donte	6' 04"	200	SG	FR	Virginia Beach, Virginia, United States
24	Jennings, Milton	6' 09"	225	F	FR	Summerville, South Carolina, United States
1	Johnson, Noel	6' 08"	190	SG	FR	Fayetteville, Georgia, United States
21	Narcisse, Brian	6' 06"	205	PF	SO	North Augusta, South Carolina, United States
55	Petrukonis, Karolis	6' 11"	260	C	SR	Trakai, Lithuania
15	Potter, David	6' 06"	215	SF	SR	Severn, Maryland, United States
05	Smith, Tanner	6' 05"	220	SG	SO	Alpharetta, Georgia, United States
02	Stitt, Demontez	6' 02"	175	PG	JR	Matthews, North Carolina, United States
11	Young, Andre	5' 09"	170	PG	SO	Albany, Georgia, United States

=== 2010 commitments ===
College recruiting
Name	Hometown	School	Height	Weight	Commit date
Marcus Thornton; PF	Atlanta, GA	Westlake High School (GA)	6 ft 7 in (2.01 m)	200 lb (91 kg)	Nov 8, 2008
Marcus Thornton; PF	Recruit ratings: Scout: Rivals: (91)				
Overall recruit ranking:
Note: In many cases, Scout, Rivals, 247Sports, On3, and ESPN may conflict in their listings of height and weight.; In these cases, the average was taken. ESPN grades are on a 100-point scale.; Sources: "Clemson Basketball Commitments". Rivals.; "2010 Clemson Basketball Commits". Scout.; "ESPN". ESPN.; "Scout.com Team Recruiting Rankings". Scout.; "2010 Team Ranking". Rivals.

== Schedule and results ==
Date time, TV	Rank^{#}	Opponent^{#}	Result	Record	Site (attendance) city, state
Exhibition
Nov 6*; 7:00 pm	No. 24	Francis Marion	W 99–51		Littlejohn Coliseum (5,000); Clemson, SC
Non-conference regular season
Nov 13*; 8:00 pm	No. 24	Presbyterian	W 84–41	1–0	Littlejohn Coliseum ( 9,177); Clemson, SC
Nov 17*; 10:00 am, ESPN	No. 22	at Liberty; ESPN College Basketball Tip-off Marathon	W 79–39	2–0	Vines Center (8,143); Lynchburg, VA
Nov 20*; 7:00 pm, FSN	No. 22	at UNC Greensboro	W 89–67	3–0	Greensboro Coliseum (5,672); Greensboro, NC
Nov 23*; 7:30 pm	No. 19	Winthrop	W 102–66	4–0	Littlejohn Coliseum (10,000); Clemson, SC
Nov 26*; 4:30 pm, ESPN2	No. 19	vs. Texas A&M; 76 Classic	L 60–69	4–1	Anaheim Convention Center (2,117^{1}); Anaheim, CA
Nov 27*; 5:00 pm, ESPNU	No. 19	vs. Long Beach State; 76 Classic	W 87–79	5–1	Anaheim Convention Center (2,067^{1}); Anaheim, CA
Nov 29*; 7:30 pm, ESPNU	No. 19	vs. No. 12 Butler; 76 Classic	W 70–69	6–1	Anaheim Convention Center (2,057^{1}); Anaheim, CA
Dec 2*; 7:15 pm, ESPN	No. 18	Illinois; ACC–Big Ten Challenge	L 74–76	6–2	Littlejohn Coliseum (10,000); Clemson, SC
Dec 6*; 1:00 pm, FS South	No. 18	South Carolina; Carolina-Clemson Rivalry	W 72–61	7–2	Littlejohn Coliseum (10,000); Clemson, SC
Dec 13*; 4:00 pm		Furman	W 82–53	8–2	Littlejohn Coliseum (7,183); Clemson, SC
Dec 16*; 7:00 pm, CSS		at East Carolina	W 80–63	9–2	Williams Arena at Minges Coliseum (4,841); Greenville, NC
Dec 19*; 7:30 pm		College of Charleston	W 94–55	10–2	Littlejohn Coliseum (8,308); Clemson, SC
Dec 22*; 7:30 pm	No. 24	Western Carolina	W 79–57	11–2	Littlejohn Coliseum (8,485); Clemson, SC
Dec 29*; 7:30 pm	No. 21	South Carolina State	W 70–67	12–2	Littlejohn Coliseum (8,589); Clemson, SC
ACC regular season
Jan 3; 7:45 pm, FSN	No. 21	at No. 7 Duke	L 53–74	12–3 (0–1)	Cameron Indoor Stadium (9,314); Durham, NC
Jan 9; 4:00 pm, Raycom		Boston College	W 72–56	13–3 (1–1)	Littlejohn Coliseum (10,000); Clemson, SC
Jan 13; 9:00 pm, ESPN	No. 24	No. 12 North Carolina	W 83–64	14–3 (2–1)	Littlejohn Coliseum (10,000); Clemson, SC
Jan 16; Noon, Raycom	No. 24	at NC State	W 73–70	15–3 (3–1)	RBC Center (17,984); Raleigh, NC
Jan 19; 7:00 pm, ESPN2	No. 17	at No. 19 Georgia Tech	L 64–66	15–4 (3–2)	Alexander Memorial Coliseum (8,738); Atlanta, GA
Jan 23; 9:00 pm, ESPN	No. 17	No. 7 Duke; ESPN College GameDay Game of the Week	L 47–60	15–5 (3–3)	Littlejohn Coliseum (10,000); Clemson, SC
Jan 26; 9:00 pm, ESPN2		at Boston College	L 69–75	15–6 (3–4)	Conte Forum (6,238); Chestnut Hill, MA
Jan 31; 5:30 pm, FSN		Maryland	W 62–53	16–6 (4–4)	Littlejohn Coliseum (10,000); Clemson, SC
Feb 6; 4:00 pm, Raycom		at Virginia Tech	L 59–70	16–7 (4–5)	Cassell Coliseum (9,847); Blacksburg, VA
Feb 10; 7:00 pm, ESPN2		Florida State	W 77–67	17–7 (5–5)	Littlejohn Coliseum (10,000); Clemson, SC
Feb 13; Noon, RSN		Miami	W 74–66	18–7 (6–5)	Littlejohn Coliseum (9,700); Clemson, SC
Feb 20; 4:00 pm, RSN		Virginia	W 72–49	19–7 (7–5)	Littlejohn Coliseum (10,000); Clemson, SC
Feb 24; 9:00 pm, Raycom		at Maryland	L 79–88	19–8 (7–6)	Comcast Center (17,514); College Park, MD
Feb 28; 5:30 pm, FSN		at Florida State	W 53–50	20–8 (8–6)	Donald L. Tucker Center (9,153); Tallahassee, FL
Mar 2; 8:00 pm, Raycom		Georgia Tech; Senior Night	W 91–80	21–8 (9–6)	Littlejohn Coliseum (10,000); Clemson, SC
Mar 7; 6:00 pm, FSN		at Wake Forest	L 65–70	21–9 (9–7)	LJVM Coliseum (14,410); Winston-Salem, NC
2010 ACC tournament
Mar 11; 9:30 pm, Raycom	(6)	vs. (11) NC State; First Round	L 57–59	21–10	Greensboro Coliseum (23,381); Greensboro, NC
2010 NCAA Men's Basketball tournament
Mar 19; 2:35 pm, CBS	(7 E)	vs. (10 E) Missouri; First Round	L 78–86	21–11	HSBC Arena (18,653); Buffalo, NY
Notes: 1 – Denotes Session Attendance
*Non-conference game. ^{#}Rankings from AP poll. (#) Tournament seedings in parentheses. All times are in Eastern Time.

^{1 – Note that rankings above 25 are not official rankings. They are representations of ranking based on the number of points received in the weekly poll.}

== Player statistics ==
As of Monday, February 15, 2010

|---TOTAL---| |---3-PTS---|               |----REBOUNDS----|
## Player  GP-GS  Min--Avg  FG-FGA  Pct 3FG-FGA  Pct  FT-FTA  Pct  Off Def  Tot  Avg  PF FO  A  TO Blk Stl  Pts  Avg
------------------------------------------------------------------------------------------------------------------------------------
35 Booker, Trevor..... 25-25  753 30.1 150-290  .517  7-26   .269  78-129  .605  63 141  204  8.2  44  0  59  46  37  37  385 15.4
02 Stitt, Demontez.... 23-22  657 28.6  87-199  .437  23-62   .371  52-68   .765  16  47  63  2.7  46  1  77  60  8  31  249 10.8
05 Smith, Tanner...... 25-25  636 25.4  76-178  .427  20-70   .286  66-90   .733  29  79  108  4.3  55  1  57  51  11  32  238  9.5
11 Young, Andre....... 25-3  643 25.7  70-172  .407  43-113  .381  39-50   .780  12  41  53  2.1  40  1  61  45  0  49  222  8.9
15 Potter, David...... 25-23  579 23.2  59-160  .369  36-93   .387  20-27   .741  21  46  67  2.7  61  2  33  41  6  33  174  7.0
45 Grant, Jerai....... 24-22  475 19.8  63-96   .656  0-0    .000  41-68   .603  57  60  117  4.9  66  2  13  30  45  20  167  7.0
31 Booker, Devin...... 25-1  290 11.6  51-83   .614  0-0    .000  22-41   .537  26  49  75  3.0  31  0   8  26  4  11  124  5.0
01 Johnson, Noel...... 25-2  387 15.5  45-127  .354  20-60   .333  8-11   .727  18  28  46  1.8  38  1  23  28  5  12  118  4.7
24 Jennings, Milton... 25-0  279 11.2  32-84   .381  4-27   .148  12-20   .600  29  43  72  2.9  32  0  13  19  7  11  80  3.2
04 Baize, Jonah.......  2-0  3  1.5  2-2  1.000  2-2  1.000  0-0    .000  0   0  0  0.0  0  0  0   0  0   0  6  3.0
21 Narcisse, Bryan.... 20-2  120  6.0  17-30   .567  2-8    .250  4-8    .500  10  10  20  1.0  19  1   5  13  5   3  40  2.0
32 Hill, Donte........ 19-0  104  5.5  10-29   .345  2-10   .200  6-13   .462  6   5  11  0.6  5  0  7   4  1   8  28  1.5
10 Baciu, Catalin..... 11-0  40  3.6  7-15   .467  0-0    .000  1-2    .500  3  14  17  1.5  5  0  2   5  1   3  15  1.4
55 Petrukonis, Karolis  5-0  17  3.4  2-2  1.000  0-0    .000  1-2    .500  0   1  1  0.2  0  0  0   0  0   0  5  1.0
03 Anderson, Zavier...  9-0  17  1.9  2-5    .400  0-0    .000  0-0    .000  1   2  3  0.3  3  0  4   2  0   2  4  0.4
TEAM...............  39  45  84  3.4  0          5  0
------------------------------------------------------------------------------------------------------------------------------------
Total.............. 25  5000  673-1472 .457 159-471  .338 350-529  .662  330 611  941 37.6 445  9 362 375 130 252 1855 74.2
Opponents.......... 25  5000  568-1378 .412 117-408  .287 330-488  .676  295 571  866 34.6 467  - 292 448  74 196 1583 63.3

== Awards and honors ==
Trevor Booker

- John R. Wooden Award Preseason & Midseason Men's Top 50 Candidate
- Naismith College Player of the Year Preseason Watch List
- ACC Preseason All-Conference Team
- ACC Co-Player of the Week – January 18, 2010

== Rankings ==
Ranking Movement	Week																			
Poll	Pre	1	2	3	4	5	6	7	8	9	10	11	12	13	14	15	16	17	18	Final
USA Today/ESPN Coaches	24	23	19	19	24	24	23	18	21	19	16	21	27	39						
Associated Press	24	22	19	18	27	29	24	21	26	24	17	28	31	–						

^{1 – Note that rankings above 25 are not official rankings. They are representations of ranking based on the number of points received in the weekly poll.}
