= 2009–10 Virginia Cavaliers men's basketball team =

American college basketball season

2009–10 Virginia Cavaliers men's basketball
- Conference: Atlantic Coast Conference
- Record: 15–16 (5–11 ACC)
- Head coach: Tony Bennett (1st season)
- Associate head coach: Ritchie McKay (1st season)
- Assistant coaches: Ron Sanchez (1st season); Jason Williford (1st season)
- Home arena: John Paul Jones Arena

2009–10 ACC men's basketball standings
	Conf.				Overall
Team	W		L	PCT	W		L	PCT
No. 3 Duke †	13	–	3	.813	35	–	5	.875
No. 20 Maryland	13	–	3	.813	24	–	9	.727
Florida State	10	–	6	.625	22	–	10	.688
Virginia Tech	10	–	6	.625	25	–	9	.735
Wake Forest	9	–	7	.563	20	–	10	.667
Clemson	9	–	7	.563	21	–	11	.656
Georgia Tech	7	–	9	.438	23	–	13	.639
Boston College	6	–	10	.375	15	–	16	.484
Virginia	5	–	11	.313	15	–	16	.484
North Carolina	5	–	11	.313	20	–	17	.541
NC State	5	–	11	.313	20	–	16	.556
Miami (FL)	4	–	12	.250	20	–	13	.606
† 2010 ACC tournament winner As of March 19, 2010; Rankings from AP Poll

The 2009–10 Virginia Cavaliers men's basketball team represented the University of Virginia during the 2009–10 NCAA Division I men's basketball season. The team was led by first-year head coach Tony Bennett, and played their home games at John Paul Jones Arena as members of the Atlantic Coast Conference.

== Last season ==
The Cavaliers fell to 10–18, with a conference record of 4–12. This was their worst conference record since Pete Gillen's final season in 2004–05, and the worst overall record for Virginia in four decades. At the conclusion of the season, head coach Dave Leitao resigned. On April 1, 2009, Washington State head coach Tony Bennett was announced as his replacement.

== Roster ==
2009–10 Virginia Cavaliers men's basketball team
Players
Coaches

Pos.	#	Name	Height	Weight	Year	Previous school	Hometown
G	1	Jontel Evans	5 ft 11 in (1.8 m)	196 lb (89 kg)	Fr	Bethel	Hampton, Va.
G	2	Mustapha Farrakhan	6 ft 4 in (1.93 m)	179 lb (81 kg)	Jr	Thornton Township	Harvey, Ill.
G	4	Calvin Baker (C)	6 ft 2 in (1.88 m)	186 lb (84 kg)	Sr	Woodside/William & Mary	Newport News, Va.
C	5	Assane Sene	7 ft 0 in (2.13 m)	234 lb (106 kg)	So	South Kent	Saint-Louis, Senegal
G	11	Thomas Kody	6 ft 3 in (1.91 m)	178 lb (81 kg)	Fr	Langley	McLean, Va.
F	12	Jamil Tucker	6 ft 9 in (2.06 m)	241 lb (109 kg)	Sr	West Side	Gary, Ind.
G	13	Sammy Zeglinski	6 ft 0 in (1.83 m)	179 lb (81 kg)	So	William Penn Charter School	Philadelphia, Pa.
G	15	Sylven Landesberg	6 ft 6 in (1.98 m)	205 lb (93 kg)	So	Holy Cross	Flushing, N.Y.
F	22	Will Sherrill	6 ft 9 in (2.06 m)	221 lb (100 kg)	Jr	Phillips Academy Andover	New York, N.Y.
G	23	Jeff Jones	6 ft 4 in (1.93 m)	200 lb (91 kg)	Jr	Monsignor Bonner	Chester, Pa.
F	24	Tristan Spurlock	6 ft 8 in (2.03 m)	213 lb (97 kg)	Fr	Word of Life Christian	Woodbridge, Va.
F	32	Mike Scott	6 ft 8 in (2.03 m)	233 lb (106 kg)	Jr	Deep Creek/Hargrave Military	Chesapeake, Va.
G/F	45	Solomon Tat (C)	6 ft 5 in (1.96 m)	223 lb (101 kg)	Sr	Community Christian School	Jos Plateau, Nigeria
F/C	55	Jerome Meyinsse (C)	6 ft 9 in (2.06 m)	245 lb (111 kg)	Sr	McKinley	Baton Rouge, La.

Head coach

- Tony Bennett (Green Bay)

Assistant coach(es)

- Ritchie McKay (Seattle Pacific)
- Ron Sanchez (SUNY-Oneonta)
- Jason Williford (Virginia)

Athletic trainer(s)

- Ethan Saliba (Kansas)

Legend

- (C) Team captain
- (S) Suspended
- (I) Ineligible
- (W) Walk-on
- Injured
- Current redshirt

Roster
Last update: 9 December 2014

== Schedule ==
Date time, TV	Opponent	Result	Record	Site (attendance) city, state
Regular season
Nov. 13*; 7:00 pm	Longwood	W 85–72	1–0	John Paul Jones Arena (10,787); Charlottesville, VA
Nov. 16*; 7:30 pm, BHSN	at USF	L 49–66	1–1	USF Sun Dome (4,193); Tampa, FL
Nov. 19*; 7:00 pm	Rider; Cancún Challenge	W 79–46	2–1	John Paul Jones Arena (8,061); Charlottesville, VA
Nov. 21*; 2:00 pm	Oral Roberts; Cancún Challenge	W 76–55	3–1	John Paul Jones Arena (8,829); Charlottesville, VA
Nov. 24*; 9:00 pm, CBS	vs. Stanford; Cancún Challenge Semifinal	L 52–57	3–2	Moon Palace Golf & Spa Resort (200); Cancún, MX
Nov. 25*; 7:00 pm, CBS	vs. Cleveland State; Cancún Challenge Consolation	W 76–65	4–2	Moon Palace Golf & Spa Resort; Cancún, MX
Nov. 30*; 7:00 pm, ESPN2	Penn State	L 66–69	4–3	John Paul Jones Arena (8,898); Charlottesville, VA
Dec. 07*; 8:00 pm, CSN	at Auburn	L 67–68	4–4	Auburn Arena (5,493); Auburn, AL
Dec. 21*; 7:00 pm	NJIT	W 68–37	5–4	John Paul Jones Arena (7,264); Charlottesville, VA
Dec. 23*; 7:00 pm	Hampton	W 80–54	6–4	John Paul Jones Arena (7,803); Charlottesville, VA
Dec. 30*; 7:00 pm	No. 24 UAB	W 72–63	7–4	John Paul Jones Arena (9,444); Charlottesville, VA
Jan. 05*; 7:00 pm	Texas–Pan American	W 72–53	8–4	John Paul Jones Arena (7,574); Charlottesville, VA
Jan. 09; 7:00 pm, Raycom	at NC State	W 70–62	9–4 (1–0)	RBC Center (16,289); Raleigh, NC
Jan. 13; Noon	No. 20 Georgia Tech	W 82–75	10–4 (2–0)	John Paul Jones Arena (8,924); Charlottesville, VA
Jan. 16; 7:00 pm, ESPNU	No. 23 Miami	W 75–57	11–4 (3–0)	John Paul Jones Arena (11,413); Charlottesville, VA
Jan. 18*; 8:00 pm	UNC Wilmington	W 69–67	12–4 (3–0)	John Paul Jones Arena (10,420); Charlottesville, VA
Jan. 23; 4:00 pm, Raycom	at Wake Forest	L 57–69	12–5 (3–1)	LJVM Coliseum (13,831); Winston-Salem, NC
Jan. 28; 7:00 pm, CSN	Virginia Tech	L 71–76 ^{OT}	12–6 (3–2)	John Paul Jones Arena (13,449); Charlottesville, VA
Jan. 31; 7:45 am, FSN	at North Carolina	W 75–60	13–6 (4–2)	Dean Smith Center (14,437); Chapel Hill, NC
Feb. 03; 7:00 pm, ESPNU	NC State	W 59–47	14–6 (5–2)	John Paul Jones Arena (10,092); Charlottesville, VA
Feb. 06; Noon, Raycom	Wake Forest	L 61–64 ^{OT}	14–7 (5–3)	John Paul Jones Arena (11,972); Charlottesville, VA
Feb. 13; 7:00 pm, Raycom	at Virginia Tech	L 55–61	14–8 (5–4)	Cassell Coliseum (9,847); Blacksburg, VA
Feb. 15; 8:00 pm, ESPN360	at Maryland	L 66–85	14–9 (5–5)	Comcast Center (17,091); College Park, MD
Feb. 17; 7:00 pm, ESPNU	Florida State	L 50–69	14–10 (5–6)	John Paul Jones Arena (10,365); Charlottesville, VA
Feb. 20; 4:00 pm, RSN	at Clemson	L 49–72	14–11 (5–7)	Littlejohn Coliseum (10,000); Clemson, SC
Feb. 23; 7:00 pm, RSN	at Miami	L 62–74	14–12 (5–8)	BankUnited Center (3,909); Coral Gables, FL
Feb. 28; 7:45 am, FSN	No. 5 Duke	L 49–67	14–13 (5–9)	John Paul Jones Arena (13,663); Charlottesville, VA
Mar. 03; 9:00 pm, ESPNU	at Boston College	L 55–68	14–14 (5–10)	Conte Forum (3,968); Chestnut Hill, MA
Mar. 06; 1:30 pm, Raycom	No. 22 Maryland	L 68–74	14–15 (5–11)	John Paul Jones Arena (13,431); Charlottesville, VA
ACC Tournament
Mar. 11; Noon, Raycom	vs. Boston College; ACC Tournament first round	W 68–62	15–15	Greensboro Coliseum; Greensboro, NC
Mar. 12; Noon, Raycom	vs. No. 4 Duke; ACC Tournament second round	L 46–57	15–16	Greensboro Coliseum; Greensboro, NC
*Non-conference game. (#) Tournament seedings in parentheses. All times are in Eastern Time.
