= 2009–10 Georgia Tech Yellow Jackets men's basketball team =

American college basketball season

2009–10 Georgia Tech Yellow Jackets men's basketball

NCAA tournament, Second Round
- Conference: Atlantic Coast Conference
- Record: 23–13 (7–9 ACC)
- Head coach: Paul Hewitt (10th season)
- Assistant coaches: Peter Zaharis; John O'Connor; Darryl LaBarrie
- Home arena: Alexander Memorial Coliseum

2009–10 ACC men's basketball standings
	Conf.				Overall
Team	W		L	PCT	W		L	PCT
No. 3 Duke †	13	–	3	.813	35	–	5	.875
No. 20 Maryland	13	–	3	.813	24	–	9	.727
Florida State	10	–	6	.625	22	–	10	.688
Virginia Tech	10	–	6	.625	25	–	9	.735
Wake Forest	9	–	7	.563	20	–	10	.667
Clemson	9	–	7	.563	21	–	11	.656
Georgia Tech	7	–	9	.438	23	–	13	.639
Boston College	6	–	10	.375	15	–	16	.484
Virginia	5	–	11	.313	15	–	16	.484
North Carolina	5	–	11	.313	20	–	17	.541
NC State	5	–	11	.313	20	–	16	.556
Miami (FL)	4	–	12	.250	20	–	13	.606
† 2010 ACC tournament winner As of March 19, 2010; Rankings from AP Poll

The 2009–10 Georgia Tech Yellow Jackets men's basketball team represented Georgia Institute of Technology in the 2009–10 college basketball season. This was Paul Hewitt's tenth season as head coach. The Yellow Jackets compete in the Atlantic Coast Conference and played their home games at Alexander Memorial Coliseum. They finished the season 23–13, 7–9 in ACC play. They advanced to the championship game of the 2010 ACC men's basketball tournament as the 7 seed before losing to regular season champion Duke. They received an at–large bid to the 2010 NCAA Division I men's basketball tournament, earning a 10 seed in the Midwest Region. They upset 7 seed Oklahoma State in the first round before falling to 2 seed and AP #5 Ohio State in the second round.

== Pre-season ==
On Thursday, September 24, it was announced that the Georgia Tech Men's basketball team had cancelled their trip to Canada, which was to take place the weekend of October 2–5, due to concerns over NCAA regulations. The Yellow Jackets were to depart October 2 for Windsor, Ontario to play two games against the Windsor Lancers Men's Basketball team and one against the Western Ontario Mustangs Men's Basketball team. The issue revolved around NCAA rules prohibiting teams from taking trips within 30 days of the official start of pre-season practice. The trip did fall within Georgia Tech's fall break from classes. NCAA regulations allow teams to take an international trip once every four years, but the trip must occur before the 30-day period leading up to the official start of pre-season practice, which this year is October 16. Georgia Tech had asked for and received a waiver from the NCAA, but ultimately decided against taking the fall break trip amid concerns over the regulations.

== Roster ==
Name	Number	Pos.	Height	Weight	Year	Hometown	High School
D'Andre Bell	13	Guard/Forward	6–6	222	Senior	Los Angeles	Palisades Charter High School
Derek Craig	33	Guard	6–4	196	Sophomore	Spring, Texas	Klein Collins High School
Derrick Favors	14	Forward	6–10	246	Freshman	Atlanta	South Atlanta High School
Nick Foreman	4	Guard	6–3	208	Sophomore	Bellaire, Texas	Bellaire High School
Kammeon Holsey	24	Forward	6–8	209	Freshman	Sparta, Georgia	Hancock Central High School
Gani Lawal	31	Forward	6–9	234	Junior	Norcross, Georgia	Norcross High School
Daniel Miller	5	Center	6–11	252	Freshman	Loganville, Georgia	Loganville Christian Academy
Maurice Miller	3	Guard	6–2	189	Junior	Memphis, Tennessee	Raleigh-Egypt High School
Brian Oliver	11	Forward	6–6	220	Freshman	Glassboro, New Jersey	William Penn High School
Zachery Peacock	35	Forward	6–8	235	Senior	Miami, Fla.	Miami Norland High School
Glen Rice Jr.	41	Guard	6–5	195	Freshman	Marietta, Georgia	George Walton Comprehensive High School
Brad Sheehan	34	Center	7–0	235	Junior	Latham, New York	Shaker High School
Sam Shew	44	Forward	6–5	190	Junior	Decatur, Georgia	Decatur High School (Georgia)
Iman Shumpert	1	Guard	6–5	209	Sophomore	Oak Park, Illinois	Oak Park and River Forest High School
Lance Storrs	10	Guard	6–5	221	Junior	Decatur, Georgia	Columbia High School
Mfon Udofia	0	Guard	6–2	187	Freshman	Stone Mountain, Georgia	Miller Grove High School

== Schedule ==
Date time, TV	Rank^{#}	Opponent^{#}	Result	Record	Site (attendance) city, state
Exhibition
Sun, Nov. 8*; 7:00PM	No. 22	Iona	W 84–76 ^{OT}	—	Alexander Memorial Coliseum (6,904); Atlanta, GA
Non-conference regular season
Sat, Nov. 14*; 7:00PM	No. 22	Florida A&M	W 100–59	1–0	Alexander Memorial Coliseum (7,491); Atlanta, GA
Thurs, Nov. 19*; 11:30PM, CSS	No. 21	vs. No. 18 Dayton; Puerto Rico Tip-Off	L 59–63	1–1	José Miguel Agrelot Coliseum (5,073); San Juan, PR
Fri, Nov. 20*; 1:00PM, ESPNU	No. 21	vs. George Mason; Puerto Rico Tip-Off	W 70–62	2–1	José Miguel Agrelot Coliseum (5,762); San Juan, PR
Sun, Nov. 22*; 12:30PM, ESPNU	No. 21	vs. Boston University; Puerto Rico Tip-Off	W 85–67	3–1	José Miguel Agrelot Coliseum (8,357); San Juan, PR
Fri, Nov. 27*; 4:00PM		Mercer	W 85–74	4–1	Alexander Memorial Coliseum (7,644); Atlanta, GA
Wed, Dec. 2*; 7:00PM		Siena	W 74–61	5–1	Alexander Memorial Coliseum (6,898); Atlanta, GA
Sat, Dec. 5*; 6:00PM, FSS		USC	W 79–53	6–1	Alexander Memorial Coliseum (6,671); Atlanta, GA
Mon, Dec. 14*; 7:00PM, RSN	No. 22	at Chattanooga	W 95–64	7–1	McKenzie Arena (4,734); Chattanooga, TN
Wed, Dec. 16*; 8:30PM	No. 22	Arkansas–Pine Bluff	W 65–53	8–1	Alexander Memorial Coliseum (6,671); Atlanta, GA
Sun, Dec. 20; 5:30PM, FSN	No. 22	Florida State	L 59–66 ^{OT}	8–2 ((0–1))	Alexander Memorial Coliseum (8,225); Atlanta, GA
Tues, Dec. 22*; 2:00PM		Kennesaw State	W 80–55	9–2	Alexander Memorial Coliseum (7,153); Atlanta, GA
Tues, Dec. 29*; 1:00PM		Winston-Salem State	W 78–43	10–2	Alexander Memorial Coliseum (7,148); Atlanta, GA
Sat, Jan. 2*; 7:00PM		at Charlotte	W 76–67	11–2	Dale F. Halton Arena (9,105); Charlotte, NC
Tues, Jan. 5*; 7:00PM, CSS	No. 20	at Georgia; Clean, Old-Fashioned Hate	L 66–73	11–3	Stegeman Coliseum (6,275); Athens, GA
ACC regular season
Sat, Jan. 9; 2:00PM, ESPN	No. 20	No. 5 Duke	W 71–65	12–3 (1–1)	Alexander Memorial Coliseum (9,191); Atlanta, GA
Wed, Jan. 13; 7:00PM	No. 20	at Virginia	L 75–82	12–4 (1–2)	John Paul Jones Arena (8,924); Charlottesville, VA
Sat, Jan. 16; 2:00PM, ESPN	No. 20	at No. 12 North Carolina	W 73–71	13–4 (2–2)	Dean Smith Center (20,704); Chapel Hill, NC
Tues, Jan. 19; 7:00PM, ESPN2	No. 19	No. 17 Clemson	W 66–64	14–4 (3–2)	Alexander Memorial Coliseum (8,738); Atlanta, GA
Sun, Jan. 24; Noon, Raycom	No. 19	at Florida State	L 66–68	14–5 (3–3)	Donald L. Tucker Center (8,661); Tallahassee, FL
Thur, Jan. 28; 7:00PM, RSN	No. 22	Wake Forest	W 79–58	15–5 (4–3)	Alexander Memorial Coliseum (9,083); Atlanta, GA
Sat, Jan. 30*; 1:00PM	No. 22	Kentucky State	W 98–50	16–5	Alexander Memorial Coliseum (8,025); Atlanta, GA
Thur, Feb. 4; 7:00PM, ESPN2	No. 21	at No. 10 Duke	L 67–86	16–6 (4–4)	Cameron Indoor Stadium (9,314); Durham, NC
Sat, Feb. 6; 4:00PM, Raycom	No. 21	NC State	W 73–71	17–6 (5–4)	Alexander Memorial Coliseum (8,760); Atlanta, GA
Wed, Feb. 10; 7:00PM, ESPNU	No. 20	at Miami (FL)	L 62–64	17–7 (5–5)	BankUnited Center (4,319); Coral Gables, FL
Sat, Feb. 13; 8:00PM, Raycom	No. 20	at Wake Forest	L 64–75	17–8 (5–6)	LJVM Coliseum (14,296); Winston-Salem, NC
Tues, Feb. 16; 9:00PM, Raycom		North Carolina	W 68–51	18–8 (6–6)	Alexander Memorial Coliseum (9,191); Atlanta, GA
Sat, Feb. 20; 2:00PM, Raycom		at Maryland	L 74–76	18–9 (6–7)	Comcast Center (17,950); College Park, MD
Sat, Feb. 27; Noon, RSN		Boston College	W 73–68	19–9 (7–7)	Alexander Memorial Coliseum (8,055); Atlanta, GA
Tues, Mar. 2; 8:00PM, Raycom		at Clemson	L 80–91	19–10 (7–8)	Littlejohn Coliseum (10,000); Clemson, SC
Sat, Mar. 6; 4:00PM, Raycom		Virginia Tech	L 82–88	19–11 (7–9)	Alexander Memorial Coliseum (8,725); Atlanta, GA
ACC tournament
Thur, Mar. 11; 7:00PM, Raycom/ESPN	(7)	vs. (10) North Carolina; First round	W 62–58	20–11	Greensboro Coliseum; Greensboro, NC
Fri, Mar. 12; 7:00PM, Raycom/ESPN	(7)	vs. (2) No. 19 Maryland; Quarterfinals	W 69–64	21–11	Greensboro Coliseum; Greensboro, NC
Sat, Mar. 13; 4:15PM, Raycom/ESPN	(7)	vs. (11) NC State; Semifinals	W 57–54	22–11	Greensboro Coliseum; Greensboro, NC
Sun, Mar. 14; 1:00PM, Raycom/ESPN	(7)	vs. (1) No. 4 Duke; Championship Game	L 61–65	22–12	Greensboro Coliseum (23,381); Greensboro, NC
NCAA tournament
Fri, Mar. 19; 7:15PM, CBS	(10 MW)	vs. (7 MW) Oklahoma State; First round	W 64–59	23–12	Bradley Center (17,580); Milwaukee, WI
Sun, Mar. 22; 2:20PM, CBS	(10 MW)	vs. (2 MW) No. 5 Ohio State; Second round	L 66–75	23–13	Bradley Center (18,031); Milwaukee, WI
*Non-conference game. ^{#}Rankings from AP poll. (#) Tournament seedings in parentheses. MW=NCAA Midwest Regional. All times are in Eastern Time.

== Rankings ==
Ranking movements Legend: ██ Increase in ranking ██ Decrease in ranking — = Not ranked RV = Received votes
	Week																			
Poll	Pre	1	2	3	4	5	6	7	8	9	10	11	12	13	14	15	16	17	18	Final
AP	22	21	RV	RV	24	22	RV	RV	20	20	19	22	21	20	RV	—	—	—	—	Not released
Coaches	20	19	25	23	21	15	22	20	17	18	18	22	19	20	RV	RV	—	—	—	RV

*AP does not release post-NCAA Tournament rankings
^Coaches did not release a Week 2 poll.
