= 2010 ACC men's basketball tournament =

- 2010 ACC Tournament logo
- Classification: Division I
- Season: 2009–10
- Teams: 12
- Site: Greensboro Coliseum; Greensboro, North Carolina
- Champions: Duke (18th title)
- Winning coach: Mike Krzyzewski (12th title)
- MVP: Kyle Singler (Duke)
- Television: ESPN/Raycom Sports

The 2010 Atlantic Coast Conference men's basketball tournament, a part of the 2009–10 NCAA Division I men's basketball season, took place from March 11 to March 14 at the Greensboro Coliseum in Greensboro, North Carolina.

This tournament was notable for the high number of upsets, with the higher seed winning only twice in the first two rounds, and the 11 and 12 seeds progressing to the semifinals. The championship game matched Duke against Georgia Tech. It was the third time a team has played 4 games (NC State in 1997 and 2007). Duke won the championship game, 65–61, to win its 9th ACC championship in 12 years. Duke went on to win the national championship.

== Seeding ==
2009–10 ACC men's basketball standings
	Conf.				Overall
Team	W		L	PCT	W		L	PCT
No. 3 Duke †	13	–	3	.813	35	–	5	.875
No. 20 Maryland	13	–	3	.813	24	–	9	.727
Florida State	10	–	6	.625	22	–	10	.688
Virginia Tech	10	–	6	.625	25	–	9	.735
Wake Forest	9	–	7	.563	20	–	10	.667
Clemson	9	–	7	.563	21	–	11	.656
Georgia Tech	7	–	9	.438	23	–	13	.639
Boston College	6	–	10	.375	15	–	16	.484
Virginia	5	–	11	.313	15	–	16	.484
North Carolina	5	–	11	.313	20	–	17	.541
NC State	5	–	11	.313	20	–	16	.556
Miami (FL)	4	–	12	.250	20	–	13	.606
† 2010 ACC tournament winner As of March 19, 2010; Rankings from AP Poll

Teams are seeded based on the final regular season standings, with ties broken under an ACC policy.

2009–10 ACC men's basketball standings
Seed	School	Conf	Overall	Tiebreaker
#1	Duke	13-3	26-5	3-0 vs. WF and CLEM
#2	Maryland	13-3	23-7	1-2 vs. WF and CLEM
#3	Florida State	10-6	22-8	1-0 vs. VT
#4	Virginia Tech	10-6	23-7	0-1 vs. FSU
#5	Wake Forest	9-7	19-9	1-0 vs. CLEM
#6	Clemson	9-7	21-9	0-1 vs. WF
#7	Georgia Tech	7-9	19-11	
#8	Boston College	6-10	15-15	
#9	Virginia	5-11	14-15	2-0 vs. UNC and NCSU
#10	North Carolina	5-11	16-15	2-1 vs. UVA and NCSU
#11	NC State	5-11	17-14	0-3 vs. UVA and UNC
#12	Miami	4-12	18-12	

== Bracket ==
First round Thursday, March 11, 2010
8	Boston College	62
9	Virginia	68
5	Wake Forest	62
12	Miami	83
7	Georgia Tech	62
10	North Carolina	58
6	Clemson	57
11	NC State	59

Quarterfinals; Friday, March 12, 2010
1	#4 Duke	57
9	Virginia	46
4	Virginia Tech	65
12	Miami	70
2	#19 Maryland	64
7	Georgia Tech	69
3	Florida State	52
11	NC State	58

Semifinals; Saturday, March 13, 2010
1	#4 Duke	77
12	Miami	74
7	Georgia Tech	57
11	NC State	54

Championship Game; Sunday, March 14, 2010
1	#4 Duke	65
7	Georgia Tech	61

AP Rankings at time of tournament

== Local radio ==
Date	Teams	Flagship station	Play-by-play announcer	Color analyst(s)
2010	Duke	WDNC	Bob Harris	John Roth
