= 2009–10 Conference USA men's basketball season =

- League: NCAA Division I
- Sport: Basketball
- Duration: January 7, 2010 through March 7, 2010
- Teams: 12
- TV partner: CBS College Sports Network

Regular Season
- 2010 C-USA Champions: UTEP
- Season MVP: Randy Culpepper

Tournament
- Champions: Houston
- Runners-up: UTEP
- Finals MVP: Kelvin Lewis, Houston

Basketball seasons
- 08–09 10–11

2009–10 Conference USA men's basketball standings
	Conf.				Overall
Team	W		L	PCT	W		L	PCT
UTEP	15	–	1	.938	26	–	7	.788
Memphis	13	–	3	.813	24	–	10	.706
UAB	11	–	5	.688	25	–	9	.735
Marshall	11	–	5	.688	24	–	10	.706
Tulsa	10	–	6	.625	23	–	12	.657
Southern Miss	8	–	8	.500	20	–	13	.606
Houston†	7	–	9	.438	19	–	16	.543
SMU	7	–	9	.438	14	–	17	.452
East Carolina	4	–	12	.250	10	–	21	.323
Tulane	3	–	13	.188	8	–	22	.267
Rice	1	–	15	.063	8	–	23	.258
UCF*	0	–	10	.000	0	–	17	.000
† 2010 CUSA Tournament winner As of March 20, 2010; Rankings from AP Poll; *UCF vacated its wins from the 2010–11 season after it was discovered that there was an ineligible player on the team.

The 2009–10 Conference USA men's basketball season marked the 15th season of Conference USA basketball.

== Preseason ==
In a vote of league coaches, Tulsa center Jerome Jordan headed up the preseason All-CUSA team and was named preseason conference player of the year. On October 29, Jordan was named to the Naismith Award watch list. Jordan's teammate Ben Uzoh was named to the 30-man preseason candidate list for the Lowe's Senior CLASS Award.

=== Preseason All-CUSA Team ===
- Aubrey Coleman, Houston
- Jerome Jordan, Tulsa
- Kelvin Lewis, Houston
- Arnett Moultrie, UTEP
- Ben Uzoh, Tulsa

Preseason Player of the Year

- Jerome Jordan, Tulsa

== Postseason ==
=== Conference USA tournament ===
This season, the Conference USA men's basketball tournament started on March 10, 2010 and ended on March 13, 2010. The games were played in Tulsa, Oklahoma at the BOK Center, where 7th seeded Houston upset number 1 seeded UTEP in the championship game.

== Conference awards & honors ==
=== Weekly awards ===
Conference USA Players of the week
Throughout the conference season, the Conference USA offices name a player and rookie of the week.

Week	Player of the week	Rookie of the week
November 16	Isaac Sosa, UCF	Elijah Millsap, UAB
November 23	Aubrey Coleman, HOU	Elliot Williams, MEM
November 30	Aubrey Coleman, HOU	Hassan Whiteside, MAR
December 7	Justin Hurtt, TLSA	Elliot Williams, MEM
December 14	Elliot Williams, MEM	Hassan Whiteside, MAR
December 21	Elijah Millsap, UAB	Marcus Jordan, UCF
December 21	Elijah Millsap, UAB	Jeremy Williams, UTEP
December 28	Aubrey Coleman, HOU	Jamarr Sanders, UAB
January 4	Elijah Millsap, UAB	Derrick Caracter, UTEP
January 11	Ben Uzoh, TLSA	Elijah Millsap, UAB
January 11	Ben Uzoh, TLSA	Elliot Williams, MEM
January 18	Aubrey Coleman, HOU	Hassan Whiteside, MAR
January 25	Randy Culpepper, UTEP	Hassan Whiteside, MAR
February 1	Derrick Caracter, UTEP	Arsalan Kazemi, RICE
February 8	Wesley Witherspoon, MEM	Derrick Caracter, UTEP
February 15	Randy Culpepper, UTEP	Elliot Williams, MEM
February 22	Randy Culpepper, UTEP	Hassan Whiteside, MAR
March 1	Aubrey Coleman, HOU	Hassan Whiteside, MAR
March 8	Tyler Wilkerson, MAR	Jordan Callahan, TULN

=== All-Conference Awards ===
- Player of the Year: Randy Culpepper, UTEP
- Freshman of the Year: Hassan Whiteside, Marshall
- Defensive Player of the Year: Hassan Whiteside, Marshall
- Sixth Man of the Year: Dago Pena, Marshall and Steven Idlet, Tulsa
- Newcomer of the Year: Elliot Williams, Memphis
- Coach of the Year: Tony Barbee, UTEP

==== Conference USA Men's Basketball All-Conference Teams ====
First Team

- Aubrey Coleman, Houston
- Randy Culpepper, UTEP
- Elijah Millsap, UAB
- Ben Uzoh, Tulsa
- Elliot Williams, Memphis

Second Team

- Derrick Caracter, UTEP
- Gary Flowers, Southern Miss
- Jerome Jordan, Tulsa
- Hassan Whiteside, Marshall
- Tyler Wilkerson, Marshall

Third Team

- Papa Dia, SMU
- Aaron Johnson, UAB
- Derek Williams, SMU
- Wesley Witherspoon, Memphis
- Brock Young, East Carolina

Freshman Team

- Keith Clanton, UCF
- Marcus Jordan, UCF
- Arsalan Kazemi, Rice
- Kendall Timmons, Tulane
- Hassan Whiteside, Marshall

Defensive Team

- Aaron Johnson, UAB
- Jerome Jordan, Tulsa
- Julyan Stone, UTEP
- Sai'Quon Stone, Southern Miss
- Hassan Whiteside, Marshall

Academic Team

- Connor Frizzelle, Rice
- Lucas Kuipers, Rice
- George Drake, UAB
- Isaac Sosa, UCF
- Isaac Gordon, UTEP

== National awards & honors ==
=== NABC ===
District 11 Coach of the Year: Tony Barbee

=== USBWA ===
On March 9, the U.S. Basketball Writers Association released its 2009–10 Men's All-District Teams, based on voting from its national membership. There were nine regions from coast to coast and a player and coach of the year were selected in each. The following enumerates all the Conference USA representatives selected within their respective regions.

District IV (KY, TN MS, AL, GA, FL)

All-District Team

- Elliot Williams, Memphis
District VI (IA, MO, KS, OK, NE, ND, SD)

All-District Team

- None Selected
District VII (TX, AR, LA)

All-District Team

- Randy Culpepper, UTEP
