= 2009–10 Houston Cougars men's basketball team =

American college basketball season

2009–10 Houston Cougars men's basketball

Conference USA tournament champions

NCAA tournament, First Round
- Conference: Conference USA
- Record: 19–16 (7–9 C-USA)
- Head coach: Tom Penders (6th season)
- Assistant coaches: Melvin Haralson; Kevin Lewis; Jerry Hobbie
- Home arena: Hofheinz Pavilion

2009–10 Conference USA men's basketball standings
| | Conf. | | | | Overall |
| Team | W | | L | PCT | W | | L | PCT |
|---|---|---|---|---|---|---|---|---|
| UTEP | 15 | – | 1 | .938 | 26 | – | 7 | .788 |
| Memphis | 13 | – | 3 | .813 | 24 | – | 10 | .706 |
| UAB | 11 | – | 5 | .688 | 25 | – | 9 | .735 |
| Marshall | 11 | – | 5 | .688 | 24 | – | 10 | .706 |
| Tulsa | 10 | – | 6 | .625 | 23 | – | 12 | .657 |
| Southern Miss | 8 | – | 8 | .500 | 20 | – | 13 | .606 |
| Houston† | 7 | – | 9 | .438 | 19 | – | 16 | .543 |
| SMU | 7 | – | 9 | .438 | 14 | – | 17 | .452 |
| East Carolina | 4 | – | 12 | .250 | 10 | – | 21 | .323 |
| Tulane | 3 | – | 13 | .188 | 8 | – | 22 | .267 |
| Rice | 1 | – | 15 | .063 | 8 | – | 23 | .258 |
| UCF* | 0 | – | 10 | .000 | 0 | – | 17 | .000 |
† 2010 CUSA Tournament winner As of March 20, 2010; Rankings from AP Poll; *UCF vacated its wins from the 2010–11 season after it was discovered that there was an ineligible player on the team.

The 2009–10 Houston Cougars men's basketball team represented the University of Houston in the college basketball 2009–10 season. It was their 65th year of season play. The head coach for the Cougars was Tom Penders, who was serving in his 6th year in that position. The team played its home games at Hofheinz Pavilion on-campus in Houston and were members of Conference USA. The Cougars finished the season 19–16, 7–9 in C-USA play. They won the 2010 Conference USA tournament, earning them a place in the NCAA tournament for the first time since 1992. They earned a 13 seed in the Midwest Region where they were defeated by Maryland in the first round. Head coach Tom Penders retired at the end of the season.

== Roster ==
2009–10 Houston Cougars men's basketball team
Players
Coaches

| Pos. | # | Name | Height | Weight | Year | Hometown |
|---|---|---|---|---|---|---|
| G | 0 | Kelvin Lewis | 6 ft 4 in (1.93 m) | 195 lb (88 kg) | Sr | Fort Worth, Texas |
| G | 1 | Sean Coleman | 6 ft 8 in (2.03 m) | 215 lb (98 kg) | RS Sr | Houston, Texas |
| G | 2 | Zamal Nixon | 6 ft 1 in (1.85 m) | 170 lb (77 kg) | Jr | Brooklyn, New York |
| F | 3 | Maurice McNeil | 6 ft 9 in (2.06 m) | 215 lb (98 kg) | Jr | New York, New York |
| C | 4 | Nick Mosley | 6 ft 9 in (2.06 m) | 220 lb (100 kg) | Sr | Beeville, Texas |
| G | 5 | Nick Haywood | 6 ft 0 in (1.83 m) | 170 lb (77 kg) | Fr | Monroe, Louisiana |
| G | 11 | Desmond Wade | 5 ft 8 in (1.73 m) | 150 lb (68 kg) | So | Linden, New Jersey |
| G | 12 | Aubrey Coleman | 6 ft 4 in (1.93 m) | 200 lb (91 kg) | Sr | Houston, Texas |
| G | 20 | Jamon Wilson | 6 ft 0 in (1.83 m) | 195 lb (88 kg) | Sr | Houston, Texas |
| G | 21 | Cory Tellis | 6 ft 0 in (1.83 m) | 190 lb (86 kg) | Jr | Friendswood, Texas |
| F | 23 | Bryce Clark | 6 ft 5 in (1.96 m) | 210 lb (95 kg) | Fr | Fort Lauderdale, Florida |
| F | 24 | Kahmell Broughton | 6 ft 7 in (2.01 m) | 245 lb (111 kg) | Jr | Carteret, New Jersey |
| G | 31 | Adam Brown | 6 ft 4 in (1.93 m) | 175 lb (79 kg) | Fr | San Antonio, Texas |
| F | 32 | Kirk Van Slyke | 6 ft 9 in (2.06 m) | 215 lb (98 kg) | Fr | The Woodlands, Texas |
| F | 40 | Kendrick Washington | 6 ft 7 in (2.01 m) | 270 lb (122 kg) | Fr | Shreveport, Louisiana |
| F | 41 | Qa'rraan Calhoun | 6 ft 8 in (2.03 m) | 215 lb (98 kg) | Jr | Hazlet, New Jersey |

Head coach

- Tom Penders (Connecticut)

Assistant coach(es)

- Melvin Haralson (Auburn)
- Kevin Lewis (SMU)
- Jerry Hobbie (Fordham)

Legend

- (C) Team captain
- (S) Suspended
- (I) Ineligible
- (W) Walk-on
- Injured
- Current redshirt

Roster
Last update: 2009-11-27

== Schedule ==
| Date time, TV | Rank^{#} | Opponent^{#} | Result | Record | Site city, state |
Regular season
| 2009/11/17*; 7:00PM | | Nicholls State | W 92–60 | 1–0 | Hofheinz Pavilion (3,076); Houston, Texas |
| 2009/11/21*; 10:05PM | | at Nevada | L 99–112 | 1–1 | Lawlor Events Center (5,721); Reno, Nevada |
| 2009/11/26*; 10:30PM, CSS | | vs. No. 25 Oklahoma; Great Alaska Shootout | W 100–93 | 2–1 | Sullivan Arena (5,447); Anchorage, Alaska |
| 2009/11/27*; 10:30PM, CSS | | vs. San Diego; Great Alaska Shootout | L 65–72 | 2–2 | Sullivan Arena (5,700); Anchorage, Alaska |
| 2009/11/28*; 7:30PM, CSS | | vs. Alaska Anchorage; Great Alaska Shootout | W 73–57 | 3–2 | Sullivan Arena (5,599); Anchorage, Alaska |
| 2009/12/06*; 2:00PM | | Texas A&M–Corpus Christi | W 83–76 | 4–2 | Hofheinz Pavilion (2,628); Houston, Texas |
| 2009/12/14*; 7:00PM | | Troy | W 93–85 | 5–2 | Hofheinz Pavilion (2,612); Houston, Texas |
| 2009/12/19*; 1:00PM, CSS | | Mississippi State | L 64–70 | 5–3 | Hofheinz Pavilion (3,422); Houston, Texas |
| 2009/12/21*; 7:00PM | | The Citadel | W 81–58 | 6–3 | Hofheinz Pavilion (2,617); Houston, Texas |
| 2009/12/23*; 7:00PM | | TCU | W 105–81 | 7–3 | Hofheinz Pavilion (3,155); Houston, Texas |
| 2009/12/29*; 7:00PM | | Louisiana Tech | L 94–99 | 7–4 | Hofheinz Pavilion (2,862); Houston, Texas |
| 2010/01/01*; 1:00PM | | at UTSA | L 82–83 | 7–5 | Convocation Center (1,263); San Antonio, Texas |
| 2010/01/03*; 1:00PM | | at Iowa State | L 75–82 | 7–6 | Hilton Coliseum (13,288); Ames, Iowa |
| 2010/01/06; 8:00PM, CSS | | at Rice; Bayou Cup | W 83–66 | 8–6 (1–0) | Tudor Fieldhouse (2,069); Houston, Texas |
| 2010/01/09; 6:00PM, CBS CS | | Tulsa | L 80–86 | 8–7 (1–1) | Hofheinz Pavilion (3,115); Houston, Texas |
| 2010/01/13; 6:00PM | | UTEP | W 75–65 | 9–7 (2–1) | Hofheinz Pavilion (2,862); Houston, Texas |
| 2010/01/16; 6:00PM | | at East Carolina | W 74–55 | 10–7 (3–1) | Minges Coliseum (3,928); Greenville, North Carolina |
| 2010/01/20; 7:00PM | | UCF | L 71–78 | 10–8 (3–2) | Hofheinz Pavilion (3,578); Houston, Texas |
| 2010/01/23; 7:00PM, ESPN2 | | at Memphis | L 77–92 | 10–9 (3–3) | FedEx Forum (17,452); Memphis, Tennessee |
| 2010/01/30; 5:00PM, CSS | | Marshall | W 81–66 | 11–9 (4–3) | Hofheinz Pavilion (4,457); Houston, Texas |
| 2010/02/03; 9:00PM, CBS CS | | at UTEP | L 58–65 | 11–10 (4–4) | Don Haskins Center (10,595); El Paso, Texas |
| 2010/02/06; 5:00PM, CSS | | Southern Miss | L 55–57 | 11–11 (4–5) | Hofheinz Pavilion (3,019); Houston, Texas |
| 2010/02/10*; 7:00PM | | at Western Kentucky | W 74–72 | 12–11 | Diddle Arena (3,168); Bowling Green, Kentucky |
| 2010/02/13; 4:00PM | | SMU | W 66–60 | 13–11 (5–5) | Hofheinz Pavilion (3,021); Houston, Texas |
| 2010/02/16; 6:00PM, CSS | | at UCF | L 65–68 | 13–12 (5–6) | UCF Arena (4,838); Orlando, Florida |
| 2010/02/20; 7:00PM | | at UAB | L 66–75 | 13–13 (5–7) | Bartow Arena (5,790); Birmingham, Alabama |
| 2010/02/24; 7:00PM | | Memphis | W 92–75 | 14–13 (6–7) | Hofheinz Pavilion (4,063); Houston, Texas |
| 2010/02/27; 7:00PM | | at SMU | L 83–94 | 14–14 (6–8) | Moody Coliseum (3,535); Dallas, Texas |
| 2010/03/03; 7:00PM | | Rice; Bayou Cup | W 78–70 | 15–14 (7–8) | Hofheinz Pavilion (3,546); Houston, Texas |
| 2010/03/06; 7:00PM | | at Tulane | L 76–79 | 15–15 (7–9) | Fogelman Arena (1,608); New Orleans, Louisiana |
C-USA tournament
| 2010/03/10*; 12:00PM | (7) | vs. (10) East Carolina; First round | W 93–80 | 16–15 | BOK Center (6,961); Tulsa, Oklahoma |
| 2010/03/11*; 12:00PM, CBS CS | (7) | vs. (2) Memphis; Quarterfinals | W 66–65 | 17–15 | BOK Center (7,089); Tulsa, Oklahoma |
| 2010/03/12*; 5:30PM, CBS CS | (7) | vs. (6) Southern Miss; Semifinals | W 74–66 | 18–15 | BOK Center (8,657); Tulsa, Oklahoma |
| 2010/03/13*; 10:30AM, CBS | (7) | vs. (1) No. 25 UTEP; Championship game | W 81–73 | 19–15 | BOK Center (8,476); Tulsa, Oklahoma |
NCAA Division I tournament
| 2010/03/19*; 9:34PM, CBS | (13 MW) | vs. (4 MW) No. 20 Maryland; First round | L 77–89 | 19–16 | Spokane Veterans Memorial Arena (10,861); Spokane, Washington |
*Non-conference game. ^{#}Rankings from AP Poll. (#) Tournament seedings in parentheses. MW=Midwest region. All times are in Central Standard Time.
