= 2009–10 Memphis Tigers men's basketball team =

American college basketball season

2009–10 Memphis Tigers men's basketball

NIT, Second round
- Conference: Conference USA
- Record: 24–10 (13–3 C-USA)
- Head coach: Josh Pastner (1st year)
- Assistant coaches: Glynn Cyprien; Jack Murphy; Willis Wilson
- Home arena: FedExForum

2009–10 Conference USA men's basketball standings
	Conf.				Overall
Team	W		L	PCT	W		L	PCT
UTEP	15	–	1	.938	26	–	7	.788
Memphis	13	–	3	.813	24	–	10	.706
UAB	11	–	5	.688	25	–	9	.735
Marshall	11	–	5	.688	24	–	10	.706
Tulsa	10	–	6	.625	23	–	12	.657
Southern Miss	8	–	8	.500	20	–	13	.606
Houston†	7	–	9	.438	19	–	16	.543
SMU	7	–	9	.438	14	–	17	.452
East Carolina	4	–	12	.250	10	–	21	.323
Tulane	3	–	13	.188	8	–	22	.267
Rice	1	–	15	.063	8	–	23	.258
UCF*	0	–	10	.000	0	–	17	.000
† 2010 CUSA Tournament winner As of March 20, 2010; Rankings from AP Poll; *UCF vacated its wins from the 2010–11 season after it was discovered that there was an ineligible player on the team.

The 2009–10 Memphis Tigers men's basketball team represented the University of Memphis in the 2009–10 college basketball season, the 89th season of Tiger basketball. The Tigers were coached by first-year head coach Josh Pastner, played their home games at the FedExForum in Memphis, Tennessee and are members of Conference USA. They finished the season 24–10, 13–3 in C-USA play. They were the 2 seed in the 2010 Conference USA men's basketball tournament where they were upset by 7 seed and eventual champion Houston. They failed to be invited to the NCAA tournament for the first time since 2005. Instead, the Tigers were invited to the 2010 National Invitation Tournament where they advanced to the second round before losing to the Ole Miss Rebels.

== Preseason ==
The 2008–09 Memphis Tigers finished the season 33–4 (16–0), as Conference USA regular season and tournament champions. After three early losses, the Tigers went on a 27-game unbeaten streak, finally coming to an end with a season-ending 102–91 loss to the Missouri Tigers in the Sweet 16. Memphis finished the season ranked 9th in the final Coaches' Poll and 3rd in the AP Poll.

A turbulent offseason for the Tigers began with the news of Billy Gillispie's firing at the University of Kentucky. Despite assurances that “Memphis is where I want to coach,” John Calipari resigned as head coach of the Tigers to take the job at Kentucky on March 31, 2009. After a week-long coaching search, Memphis athletic director R.C. Johnson announced the hiring of former Arizona and Memphis assistant Josh Pastner as head basketball coach. At 32 years of age, Coach Pastner is the second-youngest men's head basketball coach in the NCAA.

Calipari's departure resulted in the disintegration of Memphis' recruiting class. Signed recruits DeMarcus Cousins and Darnell Dodson were allowed out of their letters of intent and followed Calipari to Kentucky. Xavier Henry was also allowed to leave, and while briefly considering following Calipari as well, ultimately decided to attend the University of Kansas. Guard Nolan Dennis was also allowed to leave, choosing to attend Baylor University. Of Memphis' original 2009 recruiting class, only JUCO forward Will Coleman decided to honor his commitment to play for the Tigers. Sophomore forward Ángel García lost most of the season with an ACL tear, but made an unexpected debut after only five months of recovery. Despite shooting 52% in 2-point field goals and 41% in 3-point field goals, García saw limited action due to the recovery process.

Memphis' roster was also devastated by other departures not directly related to the coaching change. Redshirt freshman C. J. Henry, brother of Xavier Henry, chose to transfer to Kansas to play with his brother after sitting out the season due to an ankle injury. Memphis recruit Latavious Williams decided not to honor his commitment, instead deciding to play professionally in China; ultimately, Williams was drafted into the NBA Development League. On March 31, 2009, freshman sensation Tyreke Evans declared himself eligible for the 2009 NBA draft, ultimately being drafted 4th overall by the Sacramento Kings. Senior forward Shawn Taggart declared for the draft on June 6, 2009, despite having one year of eligibility remaining. Seniors Antonio Anderson and Robert Dozier also declared for the draft after their graduation from the University; Chance McGrady, brother of Houston Rockets guard Tracy McGrady also graduated, but did not declare for the draft.

The Tigers began the 2009–10 season on October 16, 2009 with Memphis Madness. Over 18,000 fans attended the free event at FedExForum, with several hundred fans turned away at the door by the Memphis Fire Department for safety reasons. The capacity crowd was the largest to ever witness a Memphis Madness event.

=== Departures ===
Name	Number	Pos.	Height	Weight	Year	Hometown	Notes
Antonio Anderson	5	G	6' 6"	215	Senior	Lynn, Massachusetts	1st all-time in games played (150); 4th all-time in steals (213); 5th all-time in assists (538); 18th all-time in points scored (1,277); 45th player to score 1,000+ points recorded 3rd all-time triple-double (12 points, 10 rebounds, 13 assists); 2nd player to record a triple-double (Penny Hardaway recorded two); 1st player with 1,000+ points, 500+ rebounds, and 500+ assists 2008 Conference USA men's basketball tournament MVP
Robert Dozier	2	F	6' 9"	220	Senior	Lithonia, Georgia	3rd all-time in games played (148); 5th all-time in blocks (228); 6th all-time in rebounds (961); 17 career double-doubles 14th all-time in points scored (1,381); 44th player to score 1,000+ points 6th player to record 1,000+ points and 900+ rebounds
Tyreke Evans	12	G	6' 6"	195	Freshman	Chester, Pennsylvania	1st all-time in steals by a freshman (77); 2nd all-time in points scored by a freshman (632); Scored in double figures in 33 games (37 played); 1st Memphis player to be named consensus National Freshman of the Year; 2009 Conference USA men's basketball tournament MVP; Drafted 4th overall in the 2009 NBA draft by the Sacramento Kings
C. J. Henry	14	G	6' 3"	195	Freshman	Oklahoma City, Oklahoma	Transferred to Kansas
Chance McGrady	10	G	6' 2"	183	Senior	Auburndale, Florida	Brother of Tracy McGrady; Only player to wear a different number every year (#11, #55, #31, #10)
Matt Simpkins	15	F	6' 9"	215	Freshman	Sacramento, California	Dismissed from team Feb. 6, 2009
Shawn Taggart	0	F	6' 10"	238	Junior	Richmond, Virginia	87 career blocks, 7 double-doubles in two seasons at Memphis (transferred from Iowa State)

Statistics accurate as of 29 March 2010.

=== Recruiting ===
College recruiting
Name	Hometown	School	Height	Weight	Commit date
Will Coleman; C	Columbus, GA	Pacelli HS	6 ft 9 in (2.06 m)	255 lb (116 kg)	Aug 14, 2008
Will Coleman; C	Recruit ratings: Scout: Rivals: (95)				
D. J. Stephens; SF	Killeen, TX	Harker Heights HS	6 ft 4 in (1.93 m)	170 lb (77 kg)	Aug 25, 2009
D. J. Stephens; SF	Recruit ratings: Scout: Rivals: (90)				
Overall recruit ranking:
Note: In many cases, Scout, Rivals, 247Sports, On3, and ESPN may conflict in their listings of height and weight.; In these cases, the average was taken. ESPN grades are on a 100-point scale.; Sources: "Memphis Basketball Commitments". Rivals.; "2009 Memphis Basketball Commits". Scout.; "ESPN". ESPN.; "Scout.com Team Recruiting Rankings". Scout.; "2009 Team Ranking". Rivals.

== Roster ==
2009–10 Memphis Tigers men's basketball team
Players
Coaches

Pos.	#	Name	Height	Weight	Year	Hometown
F	1	Pierre Henderson-Niles	6 ft 8 in (2.03 m)	278 lb (126 kg)	Sr	Memphis, Tennessee
G	2	James Harvey Jr.	6 ft 2 in (1.88 m)	200 lb (91 kg)	So	Memphis, Tennessee
G	3	Roburt Sallie	6 ft 5 in (1.96 m)	196 lb (89 kg)	Jr	Sacramento, California
G	5	Willie Kemp	6 ft 2 in (1.88 m)	184 lb (83 kg)	Sr	Bolivar, Tennessee
F	10	Will Coleman	6 ft 9 in (2.06 m)	250 lb (113 kg)	Sr	Columbus, Georgia
G/F	11	Wesley Witherspoon	6 ft 9 in (2.06 m)	210 lb (95 kg)	Jr	Atlanta, Georgia
G/F	12	Drew Barham	6 ft 7 in (2.01 m)	180 lb (82 kg)	So	Cordova, Tennessee
G	14	Charles Holt	6 ft 0 in (1.83 m)	170 lb (77 kg)	So	Jackson, Tennessee
G	15	Elliot Williams	6 ft 5 in (1.96 m)	180 lb (82 kg)	Jr	Memphis, Tennessee
G	20	Doneal Mack	6 ft 5 in (1.96 m)	187 lb (85 kg)	Sr	Charlotte, North Carolina
G/F	30	D. J. Stephens	6 ft 5 in (1.96 m)	170 lb (77 kg)	So	Killeen, Texas
G	31	Preston Laird	6 ft 2 in (1.88 m)	182 lb (83 kg)	Jr	Memphis, Tennessee
G/F	32	Malik Thomas	6 ft 4 in (1.93 m)	195 lb (88 kg)	So	Forestville, Maryland
G/F	35	Tyler Foster	6 ft 5 in (1.96 m)	185 lb (84 kg)	So	Albany, New York
F	41	Ángel García	6 ft 11 in (2.11 m)	245 lb (111 kg)	So	Toa Baja, Puerto Rico
F	54	Aaron Jacques	6 ft 6 in (1.98 m)	200 lb (91 kg)	Sr	Bartlett, Tennessee

Head coach

- Josh Pastner (Arizona)

Assistant coach(es)

- Glynn Cyprien (Texas–San Antonio)
- Jack Murphy (Arizona)
- Willis Wilson (Rice)

Legend

- (C) Team captain
- (S) Suspended
- (I) Ineligible
- (W) Walk-on
- Injured
- Current redshirt

Roster
Last update: 2010-04-08

== Schedule ==
Date time, TV	Rank^{#}	Opponent^{#}	Result	Record	Site (attendance) city, state
Exhibition
Tue, Nov 3*; 7:00 pm		LeMoyne-Owen	W 98–68		FedExForum; Memphis, TN
Mon, Nov 9*; 7:00 pm		Christian Brothers	W 66–45		FedExForum; Memphis, TN
Regular Season
Fri, Nov 13*; 8:00 pm		Jackson State	W 82–53	1–0	FedExForum (17,584); Memphis, TN
Tue, Nov 17*; 9:00 pm, ESPN		vs. No. 1 Kansas; Hall of Fame Showcase	L 55–57	1–1	Scottrade Center (12,107); St. Louis, MO
Fri, Nov 20*; 7:00 pm		Tennessee Tech; Hall of Fame Showcase	W 92–59	2–1	FedExForum (16,707); Memphis, TN
Tue, Nov 24*; 7:00 pm, WKNO		Central Arkansas; Hall of Fame Showcase	W 81–49	3–1	FedExForum (16,612); Memphis, TN
Mon, Nov 30*; 7:00 pm, WKNO		Oakland; Hall of Fame Showcase	W 77–46	4–1	FedExForum (15,689); Memphis, TN
Sat, Dec 5*; 7:00 pm, WKNO		Arkansas State	W 74–55	5–1	FedExForum (16,714); Memphis, TN
Wed, Dec 9*; 7:00 pm, WKNO		Montana State	W 76–51	6–1	FedExForum (16,077); Memphis, TN
Sat, Dec 12*; 2:00 pm		at Arkansas-Little Rock	W 83–71	7–1	Verizon Arena (5,538); North Little Rock, AR
Sat, Dec 19*; 5:00 pm, ESPN2		at Massachusetts	L 72–73	7–2	TD Garden (8,096); Boston, MA
Tue, Dec 22*; 12:00 pm		SEMO	W 87–57	8–2	FedExForum (16,894); Memphis, TN
Mon, Dec 28*; 12:00 pm		IUPUI	W 87–67	9–2	FedExForum (17,020); Memphis, TN
Thu, Dec 31*; 3:00 pm, ESPN2		No. 14 Tennessee	L 59–66	9–3	FedExForum (17,544); Memphis, TN
Sun, Jan 3*; 2:00 pm		Houston Baptist	W 93–52	10–3	FedExForum (16,414); Memphis, TN
Wed, Jan 6*; 6:00 pm, ESPN2		at No. 7 Syracuse	L 57–74	10–4	Carrier Dome (17,805); Syracuse, NY
Sat, Jan 9; 7:00 pm, CSS		at Southern Miss	W 59–57	11–4 (1–0)	Reed Green Coliseum (4,029); Hattiesburg, MS
Wed, Jan 13; 6:00 pm, CSS		East Carolina	W 77–57	12–4 (2–0)	FedExForum (15,903); Memphis, TN
Sat, Jan 16; 7:00 pm, CSS		at Rice	W 80–68	13–4 (3–0)	Tudor Fieldhouse (3,483); Houston, TX
Wed, Jan 20; 7:00 pm, CBS CS		UTEP	L 67–72	13–5 (3–1)	FedExForum (16,709); Memphis, TN
Sat, Jan 23; 7:00 pm, ESPN2		Houston	W 92–77	14–5 (4–1)	FedExForum (17,452); Memphis, TN
Wed, Jan 27; 7:00 pm, CBS CS		at Marshall	W 75–72	15–5 (5–1)	Cam Henderson Center (7,091); Huntington, WV
Sat, Jan 30; 2:00 pm		at SMU	L 60–70	15–6 (5–2)	Moody Coliseum (4,034); Dallas, TX
Wed, Feb 3; 7:00 pm, CBS CS		UAB	W 85–75	16–6 (6–2)	FedExForum (16,518); Memphis, TN
Sat, Feb 6*; 3:00 pm, ESPN2		No. 17 Gonzaga	L 58–66	16–7	FedExForum (17,037); Memphis, TN
Wed, Feb 10; 6:00 pm, CSS		UCF	W 76–70	17–7 (7–2)	FedExForum (16,581); Memphis, TN
Sat, Feb 13; 6:00 pm, ESPN2		at Tulsa	W 93–86	18–7 (8–2)	Reynolds Center (7,425); Tulsa, OK
Wed, Feb 17; 6:00 pm, CSS		at Tulane	W 77–64	19–7 (9–2)	Avron B. Fogelman Arena (1,783); New Orleans, LA
Sat, Feb 20; 7:00 pm, WKNO		SMU	W 76–63	20–7 (10–2)	FedExForum (17,047); Memphis, TN
Wed, Feb 24; 7:00 pm		at Houston	L 75–92	20–8 (10–3)	Hofheinz Pavilion (4,063); Houston, TX
Sat, Feb 27; 7:00 pm, CBS CS		Southern Miss	W 76–69	21–8 (11–3)	FedExForum (17,997); Memphis, TN
Wed, Mar 3; 8:00 pm, CSS		at UAB	W 70–65	22–8 (12–3)	Bartow Arena (8,411); Birmingham, AL
Sat, Mar 6; 12:00 pm, CBS CS		Tulsa	W 75–53	23–8 (13–3)	FedExForum (17,238); Memphis, TN
2010 Conference USA tournament
Thu, Mar 11; 12:00 pm, CBS CS		vs. Houston; Quarterfinals	L 65–66	23–9	BOK Center (NA); Tulsa, OK
2010 National Invitation Tournament
Wed, Mar 17*; 8:00 pm, ESPN2		St. John's; First round	W 73–71	24–9	FedExForum (10,231); Memphis, TN
Fri, Mar 19*; 5:30 pm, ESPN2		at Mississippi; Second round	L 81–90	24–10	Tad Smith Coliseum (8,218); Oxford, MS
*Non-conference game. ^{#}Rankings from AP Poll. (#) Tournament seedings in parentheses. All times are in Central Time.
