= 2009–10 UCF Knights men's basketball team =

American college basketball season

2009–10 UCF Knights men's basketball
- Conference: Conference USA
- Record: 0–17 (Note: UCF vacated its 15 regular season wins from the 2009–10 season after it was discovered that there was an ineligible player on the team. The team's pre-sanction record was 15–17 (6–10). The "official" record therefore stands as 0–17.) (0–10 C-USA)
- Head coach: Kirk Speraw
- Assistant coaches: Mike Jaskulski; Craig Brown; Robert McCullum
- Home arena: UCF Arena

2009–10 Conference USA men's basketball standings
	Conf.				Overall
Team	W		L	PCT	W		L	PCT
UTEP	15	–	1	.938	26	–	7	.788
Memphis	13	–	3	.813	24	–	10	.706
UAB	11	–	5	.688	25	–	9	.735
Marshall	11	–	5	.688	24	–	10	.706
Tulsa	10	–	6	.625	23	–	12	.657
Southern Miss	8	–	8	.500	20	–	13	.606
Houston†	7	–	9	.438	19	–	16	.543
SMU	7	–	9	.438	14	–	17	.452
East Carolina	4	–	12	.250	10	–	21	.323
Tulane	3	–	13	.188	8	–	22	.267
Rice	1	–	15	.063	8	–	23	.258
UCF*	0	–	10	.000	0	–	17	.000
† 2010 CUSA Tournament winner As of March 20, 2010; Rankings from AP Poll; *UCF vacated its wins from the 2010–11 season after it was discovered that there was an ineligible player on the team.

The 2009–10 UCF Knights men's basketball team was an NCAA Division I college basketball team that represented the University of Central Florida and competed in Conference USA. They played their home games at the UCF Arena in Orlando, Florida, and were led by head coach Kirk Speraw, who was in his 17th and final season with the team. In the previous year, the Knights finished the season 17–14, 7–9 in C-USA play.

In February 2012, UCF vacated its wins from the 2009–10 season after it was discovered that there was an ineligible player on the team.

== Roster ==
Name	Number	Position	Height	Weight	Year	Hometown
Keith Clanton	33	F	6–8	230	Freshman	Orlando, Florida
David Diakite	15	F	6–6	215	Redshirt freshman	Washington, D.C.
P. J. Gaynor	21	F	6–8	205	Sophomore	Jacksonville, Florida
Marcus Jordan	5	G	6–3	200	Freshman	Chicago, Illinois
Jakub Kusmieruk	13	C	7–4	280	Sophomore	Sokołów Podlaski, Poland
Dogukan Kuzucan	14	G	6–2	175	Freshman	Istanbul, Turkey
Ben O'Donnell	2	G	5–9	175	Redshirt sophomore	Largo, Florida
A. J. Rompza	3	G	5–9	160	Sophomore	Chicago, Illinois
R. J. Scott	1	G	6–2	205	Freshman	Slidell, Louisiana
Isaac Sosa	11	G	6–3	175	Sophomore	Guaynabo, Puerto Rico
Drew Speraw	10	G	6–2	175	Senior	Oviedo, Florida
Dustin Speraw	4	G	6–2	155	Freshman	Oviedo, Florida
Amara Thompson	22	G	6–4	180	Redshirt freshman	Tucker, Georgia
Taylor Young	12	G	6–1	190	Junior	Orlando, Florida
A. J. Tyler	25	F	6–9	230	Junior	Palm Harbor, Florida

=== Coaches ===
Name	Type	College	Graduating year
Kirk Speraw	Head coach	University of Iowa	1980
Mike Jaskulski	Associate head coach	St. Norbert	1976
Craig Brown	Assistant coach	University of Florida	1995
Robert McCullum	Assistant coach	Birmingham–Southern College	1976
Micah Byars	Director of basketball operations	University of West Florida	2006

== Schedule and results ==
Date time, TV	Rank^{#}	Opponent^{#}	Result	Record	Site city, state
Exhibition
November 4, 2009*; 7:00 pm, no		St. Leo	W 84–65	1–0	UCF Arena; Orlando, FL
Regular season (non-conference play)
November 13, 2009*; 7:00 pm, no		UMass	W 84–67	1–0	UCF Arena (8,727); Orlando, FL
November 17, 2009*; 7:00 pm, no		Howard	W 68–59	2–0	UCF Arena (5,215); Orlando, FL
November 20, 2009*; 6:00 pm, no		vs. Auburn; Glenn Wilkes Classic	W 84–74	3–0	Ocean Center (1,106); Daytona Beach, FL
November 21, 2009*; 3:30 pm, no		vs. Niagara; Glenn Wilkes Classic	L 46–63	3–1	Ocean Center (455); Daytona Beach, FL
November 22, 2009*; 3:30 pm, no		vs. Drake; Glenn Wilkes Classic	W 59–50	4–1	Ocean Center (1,015); Daytona Beach, FL
November 28, 2009*; 5:00 pm, no		Albany	W 76–72	5–1	UCF Arena (3,528); Orlando, FL
December 1, 2009*; 7:00 pm, no		Newberry	W 80–62	6–1	UCF Arena (4,519); Orlando, FL
December 6, 2009*; 12:00 pm, no		at Notre Dame	L 72–90	6–2	Joyce Center (8,004); Notre Dame, IN
December 12, 2009*; 5:00 pm, no		Bethune-Cookman	W 63–50	7–2	UCF Arena (4,494); Orlando, FL
December 16, 2009*; 7:00 pm, no		at South Florida; UCF–USF rivalry	L 59–65	7–3	Sun Dome (4,627); Tampa, FL
December 20, 2009*; 1:00 pm, no		at No. 14 Connecticut	L 51–60	7–4	XL Center (13,685); Hartford, CT
December 29, 2009*; 7:00 pm, no		Liberty; UCF Holiday Classic	W 82–58	8–4	UCF Arena (4,641); Orlando, FL
December 30, 2009*; 7:00 pm, no		Jacksonville; UCF Holiday Classic	L 51–61	8–5	UCF Arena (4,111); Orlando, FL
January 5, 2010*; 7:00 pm, no		at No. 14 Ole Miss	L 56–84	8–6	Tad Smith Coliseum (5,538); University, MS
Regular season (C-USA conference play)
January 9, 2010; 5:00 pm, no		Rice	W 77–58	9–6 (1–0)	UCF Arena (4,198); Orlando, FL
January 13, 2010; 8:00 pm, no		Marshall	L 75–81	9–7 (1–1)	UCF Arena (9,460); Orlando, FL
January 16, 2010; 8:00 pm, no		at Tulsa	L 70–90	9–8 (1–2)	Reynolds Center (5,744); Tulsa, OK
January 20, 2010; 8:00 pm, no		at Houston	W 78–71	10–8 (2–2)	Hofheinz Pavilion (3,578); Houston, TX
January 23, 2010; 5:00 pm, no		UTEP	L 59–96	10–9 (2–3)	UCF Arena (6,413); Orlando, FL
January 27, 2010; 8:00 pm, no		at SMU	L 43–65	10–10 (2–4)	Moody Coliseum (2,307); University Park, TX
January 30, 2010; 5:00 pm, no		Tulsa	L 50–55	10–11 (2–5)	UCF Arena (6,632); Orlando, FL
February 2, 2010; 7:00 pm, no		at East Carolina	W 67–56	11–11 (3–5)	Williams Arena at Minges Coliseum (3,589); Greenville, NC
February 10, 2010; 7:00 pm, no		Memphis	L 70–76	11–12 (3–6)	FedEx Forum (16,581); Memphis, TN
February 13, 2010; 4:00 pm, no		Tulane	W 62–54	12–12 (4–6)	UCF Arena (5,122); Orlando, FL
February 16, 2010; 7:00 pm, no		Houston	W 68–65	13–12 (5–6)	UCF Arena (4,838); Orlando, FL
February 20, 2010; 8:00 pm, no		at Southern Miss	L 58–68	13–13 (5–7)	Reed Green Coliseum (3,718); Hattiesburg, MS
February 24, 2010; 7:00 pm, no		UAB	L 49–53	13–14 (5–8)	UCF Arena (4,618); Orlando, FL
February 27, 2010; 7:00 pm, no		Marshall	L 115–121	13–15 (5–9)	Cam Henderson Center (7,803); Huntington, WV
March 2, 2010; 7:00 pm, no		East Carolina	L 66–68	13–16 (5–10)	UCF Arena (4,644); Orlando, FL
March 6, 2010; 3:00 pm, no		at Rice	W 66–59	14–16 (6–10)	Autry Court (1,899); Houston, TX
C-USA tournament
March 10, 2010; 9:30 pm, no		vs. SMU	W 69–53	15–16	Bank of Oklahoma Center (7,760); Tulsa, OK
March 11, 2010; 10:00 pm, no		vs. No. 25 UTEP	L 54–76	15–17	Bank of Oklahoma Center (8,130); Tulsa, OK
*Non-conference game. Rankings from AP poll. All times are in Eastern Time.

== Postseason ==
Following the conclusion of the season, on March 15, 2010, Speraw was fired as head basketball coach. He had amassed a 279-233 record over a 17-year stretch as the Knights head coach. On March 30, UCF announced current Marshall head coach, Donnie Jones, as the new UCF head coach.

== See also ==
- List of UCF Knights men's basketball seasons
