= 2010 National Invitation Tournament =

American men's college basketball tournament

- Season: 2009–10
- Teams: 32
- Finals site: Madison Square Garden, New York City
- Champions: Dayton Flyers (3rd title)
- Runner-up: North Carolina Tar Heels (2nd title game)
- Semifinalists: Ole Miss Rebels (2nd semifinal); Rhode Island Rams (3rd semifinal)
- Winning coach: Brian Gregory (1st title)
- MVP: Chris Johnson (Dayton)

The 2010 National Invitation Tournament was a single-elimination tournament of 32 National Collegiate Athletic Association (NCAA) Division I teams that were not selected to participate in the 2010 NCAA Division I men's basketball tournament. The 73rd annual tournament began on March 16 on campus sites and ended on April 1 at Madison Square Garden in New York City. Dayton won their 3rd NIT title (first title since 1968) over North Carolina, 79–68.

== Participants ==
=== Automatic qualifiers ===
The following teams were automatic qualifiers for the 2010 NIT field after losing in their respective conference tournaments, by virtue of winning their conferences' regular season championship and not qualifying for the NCAA tournament.

Team	Conference	Record	Appearance	Last bid
Coastal Carolina	Big South	28–6	1st	Never
Jackson State	SWAC	19–12	2nd	1993
Jacksonville*	Atlantic Sun	19–12	6th	2009
Kent State	MAC	23–9	8th	2005
Quinnipiac	Northeast	23–9	1st	Never
Stony Brook	America East	22–9	1st	Never
Troy	Sun Belt	20–12	2nd	2004
Weber State	Big Sky	20–10	3rd	2009

*Jacksonville split the Atlantic Sun regular season title with Campbell, Lipscomb and Belmont, but the conference tournament was won by fifth-seeded East Tennessee State. The Dolphins earned the automatic NIT bid by advancing the furthest of the four in the Atlantic Sun tournament even though Lipscomb was the #1 seed in the tournament.

The entire 32-team field was announced on March 14, 2010, on The NIT Selection Show at 9 pm ET on ESPNU.

=== Seedings ===
Seed	School	Conference	Record	Berth type
1	Illinois	Big Ten	19–14	At-large
2	Cincinnati	Big East	18–15	At-large
3	Dayton	Atlantic 10	20–12	At-large
4	Kent State	MAC	23–9	Automatic
5	Tulsa	C-USA	23–11	At-large
6	Illinois State	MVC	22–10	At-large
7	Weber State	Big Sky	20–10	Automatic
8	Stony Brook	America East	22–9	Automatic

Seed	School	Conference	Record	Berth type
1	Virginia Tech	ACC	23–8	At-large
2	Rhode Island	Atlantic 10	23–9	At-large
3	Wichita State	MVC	25–9	At-large
4	Connecticut	Big East	17–15	At-large
5	Northeastern	CAA	20–12	At-large
6	Nevada	WAC	20-12	At-large
7	Northwestern	Big Ten	20–13	At-large
8	Quinnipiac	NEC	23–9	Automatic

Seed	School	Conference	Record	Berth type
1	Arizona State	Pac-10	22–10	At-large
2	Mississippi	SEC	21–10	At-large
3	Memphis	C-USA	23–9	At-large
4	Seton Hall	Big East	19–12	At-large
5	Texas Tech	Big 12	17–15	At-large
6	St. John's	Big East	17–15	At-large
7	Troy	Sun Belt	20–12	Automatic
8	Jacksonville	Atlantic Sun	19–12	Automatic

Seed	School	Conference	Record	Berth type
1	Mississippi State	SEC	23–11	At-large
2	UAB	C-USA	23–8	At-large
3	South Florida	Big East	20–12	At-large
4	North Carolina	ACC	16–16	At-large
5	William & Mary	CAA	22–10	At-large
6	NC State	ACC	19–15	At-large
7	Coastal Carolina	Big South	28–6	Automatic
8	Jackson State	SWAC	19–12	Automatic

== Bracket ==
Played on the home court of the higher-seeded team (except #1 Illinois in the first round)

=== Illinois bracket ===
First round March 17
1	Illinois	76
8	Stony Brook	66
4	Kent State	75
5	Tulsa	74
3	Dayton	63
6	Illinois State	42
2	Cincinnati	76
7	Weber State	62

Second round March 22
1	Illinois	75
4	Kent State	58
3	Dayton	81
2	Cincinnati	66

Quarterfinals; March 24
1	Illinois	71
3	Dayton	77

=== Arizona State bracket ===
First round March 16–17
1	Arizona State	66
8	Jacksonville	67
4	Seton Hall	69
5	Texas Tech	87
3	Memphis	73
6	St. John's	71
2	Mississippi	84
7	Troy	65

Second round March 19–20
8	Jacksonville	64
5	Texas Tech	69
3	Memphis	81
2	Mississippi	90

Quarterfinals; March 23
5	Texas Tech	87
2	Mississippi (2OT)	90

=== Virginia Tech bracket ===
First round March 16, 17
1	Virginia Tech	81
8	Quinnipiac	61
4	Connecticut	59
5	Northeastern	57
3	Wichita State	70
6	Nevada	74
2	Rhode Island	76
7	Northwestern	64

Second round March 22
1	Virginia Tech	65
4	Connecticut	63
6	Nevada	83
2	Rhode Island	85

Quarterfinals; March 24
1	Virginia Tech	72
2	Rhode Island	79

==== First round ====
ESPN2

March 16
7:00 pm ET

Recap

(5) Northeastern 57, (4) Connecticut 59
Scoring by half: 26–34, 31–25
Pts: Matt Janning 17; Rebs: Nkem Ojougboh 7 Asts: Matt Janning 4 Blocks: Nkem Ojougboh 2	Pts: Jerome Dyson 18; Rebs: Alex Oriakhi 9 Asts: Jerome Dyson 4 Blocks: Alex Oriakhi 2

Harry S. Gampel Pavilion
Attendance: 5,571
Referees: Mike Stephens, Bryan Kersey, John Gaffney

==== Second round ====
ESPN

March 22
7:00 pm ET

Recap

(4) Connecticut 63, (1) Virginia Tech 65
Scoring by half: 35–30, 28–35
Pts: Kemba Walker 18; Rebs: Stanley Robinson 8 Asts: Kemba Walker 4 Blocks: Ater Majok, Charles Okwandu 2	Pts: Dorenzo Hudson 27; Rebs: Dorenzo Hudson 7 Asts: Malcom Delaney 9 Blocks: Terrell Bell 2

Cassell Pavilion
Attendance: 6,983
Referees: Karl Hess, Doug Shows, Jeff Anderson

=== Mississippi State bracket ===
First round March 16
1	Mississippi State	81
8	Jackson State	67
4	North Carolina	80
5	William & Mary	72
3	South Florida	57
6	NC State	58
2	UAB	65
7	Coastal Carolina	49

Second round March 20
1	Mississippi State	74
4	North Carolina	76
6	NC State	52
2	UAB	72

Quarterfinals; March 23
4	North Carolina	60
2	UAB	55

=== NIT Final Four ===
Played at Madison Square Garden in New York City

Semifinals; March 30
3	Dayton	68
2	Mississippi	63
2	Rhode Island	67
4	North Carolina (OT)	68

Championship; April 1
3	Dayton	79
4	North Carolina	68

== Broadcasters ==
=== Local Radio ===
Teams	Flagship station	Play-by-play	Analyst
Connecticut	WTIC–AM	Joe D'Ambrosio	Wayne Norman
NC State	WRAL–FM/Wolfpack Sports Network	Gary Hahn	Tony Haynes
North Carolina	Leafield/Tar Heel Sports Network	Woody Durham	Eric Montross

== See also ==
- 2010 Women's National Invitation Tournament
- 2010 NCAA Division I men's basketball tournament
- 2010 NCAA Division II men's basketball tournament
- 2010 NCAA Division III men's basketball tournament
- 2010 NCAA Division I women's basketball tournament
- 2010 NCAA Division II women's basketball tournament
- 2010 NCAA Division III women's basketball tournament
- 2010 NAIA Division I men's basketball tournament
- 2010 NAIA Division II men's basketball tournament
- 2010 NAIA Division I women's basketball tournament
- 2010 NAIA Division II women's basketball tournament
- 2010 College Basketball Invitational
- 2010 CollegeInsider.com Postseason Tournament
