= 2009–10 UAB Blazers men's basketball team =

American college basketball season

2009–10 UAB Blazers men's basketball

NIT, Quarterfinals
- Conference: Conference USA
- Record: 25–9 (11–5 C-USA)
- Head coach: Mike Davis
- Assistant coaches: Donnie Marsh; Wes Flanigan; Chris Long
- Home arena: Bartow Arena

2009–10 Conference USA men's basketball standings
	Conf.				Overall
Team	W		L	PCT	W		L	PCT
UTEP	15	–	1	.938	26	–	7	.788
Memphis	13	–	3	.813	24	–	10	.706
UAB	11	–	5	.688	25	–	9	.735
Marshall	11	–	5	.688	24	–	10	.706
Tulsa	10	–	6	.625	23	–	12	.657
Southern Miss	8	–	8	.500	20	–	13	.606
Houston†	7	–	9	.438	19	–	16	.543
SMU	7	–	9	.438	14	–	17	.452
East Carolina	4	–	12	.250	10	–	21	.323
Tulane	3	–	13	.188	8	–	22	.267
Rice	1	–	15	.063	8	–	23	.258
UCF*	0	–	10	.000	0	–	17	.000
† 2010 CUSA Tournament winner As of March 20, 2010; Rankings from AP Poll; *UCF vacated its wins from the 2010–11 season after it was discovered that there was an ineligible player on the team.

The 2009–10 UAB Blazers men's basketball team represented the University of Alabama at Birmingham in the 2009–10 NCAA Division I men's basketball season. This was head coach Mike Davis's fourth season at UAB. The Blazers competed in Conference USA and played their home games at Bartow Arena. They finished the season 25–9, 11–5 in CUSA play and lost in the quarterfinals of the 2010 Conference USA men's basketball tournament. They were invited to the 2010 National Invitation Tournament and advanced to the quarterfinals before falling to North Carolina.

== Roster ==
#	Name	Height	Weight (lbs.)	Position	Class	Hometown	Previous Team(s)
1	Aaron Johnson	5'8"	185	G	Jr.	Chicago, IL, U.S.	Hubbard HS
3	Anthony Criswell	6'9"	205	F	Fr.	Oklahoma City, OK, U.S.	Douglass HS
4	Jamarr Sanders	6'4"	200	G	Jr.	Montgomery, AL, U.S.	Jeff Davis HS; NW Florida CC
5	Robert Williams	6'4"	200	G	Fr.	Greenville, MS, U.S.	Weston HS
10	Karl Moton	5'11"	180	G	Fr.	Stone Mountain, GA, U.S.	Chamblee HS
15	Kenneth Cooper	6'10"	260	C	Sr.	Grambling, LA, U.S.	Richwood HS; La Tech
22	Cameron Moore	6'10"	225	F	So.	San Antonio, TX, U.S.	Roosevelt HS
23	Dexter Fields	6'2"	190	G	Fr.	Orlando, FL, U.S.	Olympia HS
24	Elijah Millsap	6'6"	210	G	Jr.	Grambling, LA, U.S.	Grambling HS; Louisiana–Lafayette
32	Ovie Soko	6'8"	225	F	Fr.	London, England, U.K.	Bethel HS
34	George Drake	6'4"	215	G	Sr.	Calera, AL, U.S.	Calera HS; Vanderbilt
35	Howard Crawford	6'8"	240	F	Sr.	Eutaw, AL, U.S.	Greene County HS

== Schedule and results ==
- All times are Eastern

Date time, TV	Rank^{#}	Opponent^{#}	Result	Record	Site (attendance) city, state
Exhibition
11/3/2009; 7:00pm		Miles	W 97–49		Bartow Arena (1,948); Birmingham, AL
Regular Season
11/13/2009*; 4:00pm		vs. UW–Green Bay; Hispanic College Fund Tournament	W 68–56	1–0	M.A.C. Center (NA); Kent, OH
11/14/2009*; 6:00pm		at Kent State; Hispanic College Fund Tournament	L 72–65	1–1	M.A.C. Center (2,632); Kent, OH
11/15/2009*; 1:00pm		vs. Samford; Hispanic College Fund Tournament	W 55–52	2–1	M.A.C. Center (NA); Kent, OH
11/17/2009*; 7:45pm		at Jacksonville State	W 87–62	3–1	Pete Mathews Coliseum (4,218); Jacksonville, AL
11/21/2009*; 7:00pm, CSS		Georgia	W 72–56	4–1	Bartow Arena (6,245); Birmingham, AL
11/24/2009*; 7:00pm		Troy	W 77–59	5–1	Bartow Arena (4,129); Birmingham, AL
11/28/2009*; 7:30pm		Florida A&M	W 90–59	6–1	Bartow Arena (3,860); Birmingham, AL
12/2/2009*; 7:00pm		Middle Tennessee State	W 65–64	7–1	Bartow Arena (3,207); Birmingham, AL
12/4/2009*; 7:00pm		East Tennessee State; UAB Health System Gene Bartow Classic	W 74–52	8–1	Bartow Arena (6,411); Birmingham, AL
12/16/2009*; 6:00pm, CBSCS		No. 25 Cincinnati	W 64–47	9–1	Bartow Arena (6,939); Birmingham, AL
12/19/2009*; 5:30pm, CSS		at South Alabama	W 72–54	10–1	Mitchell Center (NA); Mobile, AL
12/22/2009*; 7:00pm		No. 20 Butler	W 67–57	11–1	Bartow Arena (8,367); Birmingham, AL
12/30/2009*; 6:00pm	No. 24	at Virginia	L 72–63	11–2	John Paul Jones Arena (9,444); Charlottesville, VA
1/2/2010*; 11:00am	No. 24	at Arkansas	W 73–72	12–2	Bud Walton Arena (12,106); Fayetteville, AR
1/6/2010; 7:00pm		East Carolina	W 76–68	13–2 (1–0)	Bartow Arena (5,877); Birmingham, AL
1/9/2010; 7:00pm		at Tulane	W 58–49	14–2 (2–0)	Fogelman Arena (1,588); New Orleans, LA
1/16/2010; 7:00pm		Southern Methodist	W 63–62	15–2 (3–0)	Moody Coliseum (2,327); Dallas, TX
1/20/2010; 6:00pm, CSS		Southern Mississippi	W 57–56	16–2 (4–0)	Bartow Arena (5,156); Birmingham, AL
1/23/2010; 6:00pm, CSS		at Marshall	W 61–59	17–2 (5–0)	Cam Henderson Center (8,111); Huntington, WV
1/26/2010; 7:00pm	No. 25	Tulsa	W 65–55	18–2 (6–0)	Bartow Arena (7,691); Birmingham, AL
1/30/2010; 7:00pm	No. 25	UTEP	L 74–65 ^{2OT}	18–3 (6–1)	Bartow Arena (8,533); Birmingham, AL
2/3/2010; 7:00pm, CBSCS		at Memphis	L 85–75	18–4 (6–2)	FedExForum (16,518); Memphis, TN
2/6/2010; 6:00pm		at Rice	W 76–65	19–4 (7–2)	Tudor Fieldhouse (2,207); Houston, TX
2/13/2010; 7:00pm		Marshall	L 81–74	19–5 (7–3)	Bartow Arena (6,189); Birmingham, AL
2/17/2010; 7:00pm		at Southern Mississippi	W 59–54	20–5 (8–3)	Reed Green Coliseum (3,641); Hattiesburg, MS
2/20/2010; 7:00pm		Houston	W 75–66	21–5 (9–3)	Bartow Arena (5,790); Birmingham, AL
2/24/2010; 6:00pm		at Central Florida	W 53–49	22–5 (10–3)	UCF Arena (4,618); Orlando, FL
2/27/2010; 1:00pm		Tulane	W 76–55	23–5 (11–3)	Bartow Arena (4,589); Birmingham, AL
3/3/2010; 6:00pm, CSS		Memphis	L 70–65	23–6 (11–4)	Bartow Arena (8,411); Birmingham, AL
3/6/2010; 8:05pm		at No. 24 UTEP	L 52–50	23–7 (11–5)	Don Haskins Center (12,222); El Paso, TX
2010 Conference USA men's basketball tournament
3/11/10; 2:30pm, CBSCS		vs. Southern Mississippi; Quarterfinals	L 58–44	23–8	BOK Center (7,089); Tulsa, OK
2010 National Invitation Tournament
3/16/2010; 7:00pm		Coastal Carolina; First Round	W 65–49	24–8	Bartow Arena (3,081); Birmingham, AL
3/20/2010; 5:00pm, ESPNU		North Carolina State; Second Round	W 72–52	25–8	Bartow Arena (4,096); Birmingham, AL
3/23/2010; 9:00pm, ESPN		North Carolina; Quarterfinals	L 60–55	25–9	Bartow Arena (8,889); Birmingham, AL
*Non-conference game. ^{#}Rankings from AP Poll. (#) Tournament seedings in parentheses.

== See also ==
- UAB Blazers men's basketball
- 2009–10 Conference USA men's basketball season

== Rankings ==
Ranking movements Legend: ██ Increase in ranking ██ Decrease in ranking — = Not ranked
	Week																			
Poll	Pre	1	2	3	4	5	6	7	8	9	10	11	12	13	14	15	16	17	18	Final
AP	—	—	—	—	—	—	—	24	—	—	—	25	—	—	—	—	—	—	—	Not released
Coaches	—	—^	—	—	—	—	—	—	—	—	—	—	—	—	—	—	—	—	—	—

*AP does not release post-NCAA Tournament rankings
^Coaches did not release a Week 2 poll.
