= 2009–10 East Carolina Pirates men's basketball team =

American college basketball season

2009–10 East Carolina Pirates men's basketball
- Conference: Conference USA
- Record: 10–21 (4–12 C-USA)
- Head coach: Mack McCarthy
- Assistant coaches: Michael Perry; Larry Epperly; John Moseley
- Home arena: Williams Arena

2009–10 Conference USA men's basketball standings
	Conf.				Overall
Team	W		L	PCT	W		L	PCT
UTEP	15	–	1	.938	26	–	7	.788
Memphis	13	–	3	.813	24	–	10	.706
UAB	11	–	5	.688	25	–	9	.735
Marshall	11	–	5	.688	24	–	10	.706
Tulsa	10	–	6	.625	23	–	12	.657
Southern Miss	8	–	8	.500	20	–	13	.606
Houston†	7	–	9	.438	19	–	16	.543
SMU	7	–	9	.438	14	–	17	.452
East Carolina	4	–	12	.250	10	–	21	.323
Tulane	3	–	13	.188	8	–	22	.267
Rice	1	–	15	.063	8	–	23	.258
UCF*	0	–	10	.000	0	–	17	.000
† 2010 CUSA Tournament winner As of March 20, 2010; Rankings from AP Poll; *UCF vacated its wins from the 2010–11 season after it was discovered that there was an ineligible player on the team.

The 2009–2010 East Carolina Pirates men's basketball team represented East Carolina University during the 2009–2010 NCAA Division I basketball season. The Pirates were coached by Mack McCarthy and played their home games at Williams Arena at Minges Coliseum. The Pirates finished the season 10–21 and 4–12 in Conference USA play and lost in the first round of the 2010 Conference USA men's basketball tournament to eventual tournament champion Houston.

== Recruiting ==
College recruiting information
Name	Hometown	School	Height	Weight	Commit date
Wakefield Ellison; SG	Asheville, NC	Asheville High School	6 ft 6 in (1.98 m)	190 lb (86 kg)	
Wakefield Ellison; SG	Recruit ratings: Scout: Rivals: (88)				
Corvonn Gaines; SG	Worcester, MA	Worcester Academy	6 ft 4 in (1.93 m)	200 lb (91 kg)	
Corvonn Gaines; SG	Recruit ratings: Scout: Rivals: (81)				
Darius Morales; C	Orlando, FL	Timber Creek High School	6 ft 9 in (2.06 m)	210 lb (95 kg)	
Darius Morales; C	Recruit ratings: Scout: Rivals: (82)				
Erin Straughn; SF	Pensacola, FL	Pensacola High School	6 ft 6 in (1.98 m)	205 lb (93 kg)	
Erin Straughn; SF	Recruit ratings: Scout: Rivals: (82)				
Overall recruit ranking:
Note: In many cases, Scout, Rivals, 247Sports, On3, and ESPN may conflict in their listings of height and weight.; In these cases, the average was taken. ESPN grades are on a 100-point scale.; Sources: "East Carolina Basketball Commitments". Rivals.; "2009 East Carolina Basketball Commits". Scout.; "ESPN". ESPN.; "Scout.com Team Recruiting Rankings". Scout.; "2009 Team Ranking". Rivals.

== Coaching staff ==
Name	Position	Year	Alma Mater (Year)
Mack McCarthy	Head Coach	5th (3rd as head coach)	Virginia Tech (1974)
Michael Perry	Assistant Coach	3rd	Richmond (1981)
Larry Epperly	Assistant Coach	3rd	Emory and Henry College (1974)
John Moseley	Assistant Coach	2nd	East Carolina (1998)
John Ashaolu	Director of Basketball Operations	1st	Xavier (La.) (2004)
Beth Kirkland	Administrative Assistant	10th	

== Roster ==
Listed are the student athletes who are members of the 2009-2010 team.

East Carolina Basketball 2009–10 Roster
Pos.	No.	Name	Class	Hometown
F	1	Darrius Morrow	SO	Atlanta, GA (Columbia High School)
G	3	Greyson Sargent	SR	Wake Forest, NC (Fork Union Military Academy)
G	5	Howard Hurt	RS FS	Salisbury, NC (North Davidson High School)
G	10	Brock Young	JR	Raleigh, NC (Broughton High School)
G	11	Corvonn Gaines	FR	Madison, WI (Worcester Academy)
G	15	Chris Turner	SO	Durham, NC (Humble Christian Life Center)
G/F	21	Jamar Abrams	JR	Richmond, VA (Highland Springs High School)
G	23	Erin Straughn	FR	Pensacola, FL (Pensacola High School)
G	24	Jontae Sherrod	JR	Tarboro, NC (Tarboro High School)
G	30	Wakefield Ellison	FR	Asheville, NC (Asheville High School)
C	33	Chad Wynn	JR	Atlanta, GA (North Atlanta Prep Academy)
G	34	Evan Salzano	FR	Sylva, NC (Carolina Day School)
F/C	35	Darius Morales	FR	Orlando, FL (Timber Creek High School)
F	42	DaQuan Joyner	RS SO	Goldsboro, NC (Goldsboro High School)

== Schedule ==
Date time, TV	Rank^{#}	Opponent^{#}	Result	Record	Site (attendance) city, state
Regular season
November 13*; 6:00pm		Virginia–Wise	W 77–60	1–0	Williams Arena at Minges Coliseum (4,087); Greenville, NC
November 15*; 2:00pm, MASN		vs. Wake Forest	L 58–89	1–1	Greensboro Coliseum (5,416); Greensboro, NC
November 17*; 7:00pm		at Campbell	L 68–74	1–2	John W. Pope Jr. Convocation Center (2,778); Buies Creek, NC
November 20*; 6:00pm		vs. No. 10 Tennessee; Paradise Jam	L 66–105	1–3	Sports and Fitness Center; Saint Thomas, US Virgin Islands
November 21*; 4:30pm		vs. Northern Iowa; Paradise Jam	L 68–74	1–4	Sports and Fitness Center; Saint Thomas, US Virgin Islands
November 23*; 1:00pm		vs. South Dakota State; Paradise Jam	W 82–73	2–4	Sports and Fitness Center; Saint Thomas, US Virgin Islands
November 28*; 4:00pm		at UNC Greensboro	W 82–61	3–4	Greensboro Coliseum (2,231); Greensboro, NC
December 2*; 8:00pm		at Charlotte	L 68–80	3–5	Dale F. Halton Arena (6,634); Charlotte, NC
December 5*; 7:00pm		Coker	W 69–63	4–5	Williams Arena at Minges Coliseum (3,413); Greenville, NC
December 16*; 7:00pm, CSS		Clemson	L 63–80	4–6	Williams Arena at Minges Coliseum (4,841); Greenville, NC
December 19*; 7:00pm		St. Andrews	W 74–69	5–6	Williams Arena at Minges Coliseum (3,315); Greenville, NC
December 22*; 7:00pm		George Washington	L 84–80 ^{OT}	5–7	Williams Arena at Minges Coliseum (3,468); Greenville, NC
December 29*; 7:30pm		at VCU	L 82–74	5–8	Stuart C. Siegel Center (7,124); Richmond, VA
January 3*; 3:00pm		North Carolina Central	W 68–58	6–8	Williams Arena at Minges Coliseum (3,631); Greenville, NC
January 6; 8:00pm		at UAB	L 76–68	6–9 (0–1)	Bartow Arena (5,877); Birmingham, AL
January 9; 7:00pm		Marshall	L 83–65	6–10 (0–2)	Williams Arena at Minges Coliseum (4,405); Greenville, NC
January 13; 8:00pm, CSS		at Memphis	L 77–57	6–11 (0–3)	FedExForum (15,903); Memphis, TN
January 16; 7:00pm		Houston	L 74–55	6–12 (0–4)	Williams Arena at Minges Coliseum (3,982); Greenville, NC
January 23; 5:00pm		at Southern Miss	L 68–53	6–13 (0–5)	Reed Green Coliseum (3,684); Hattiesburg, MS
January 24; 3:00pm		at Tulane	W 61–46	7–13 (1–5)	Fogelman Arena (1,443); New Orleans, LA
January 30; 7:00pm		Rice	L 69–58	7–14 (1–6)	Williams Arena at Minges Coliseum (1,858); Greenville, NC
February 2; 7:00pm		UCF	L 67–56	7–15 (1–7)	Williams Arena at Minges Coliseum (3,589); Greenville, NC
February 6; 7:00pm		at Marshall	L 100–49	7–16 (1–8)	Cam Henderson Center (5,603); Huntington, WV
February 10; 7:00pm		Tulane	W 71–68	8–16 (2–8)	Williams Arena at Minges Coliseum (3,321); Greenville, NC
February 13; 9:05pm		at UTEP	L 100–76	8–17 (2–9)	Don Haskins Center (11,794); El Paso, TX
February 20; 3:00pm		at Rice	W 76–65	9–17 (3–9)	Tudor Fieldhouse (1,983); Houston, TX
February 24; 7:00pm, CBSCS		SMU	L 59–54	9–18 (3–10)	Williams Arena at Minges Coliseum (3,647); Greenville, NC
February 27; 7:00pm		Tulsa	L 85–73	9–19 (3–11)	Williams Arena at Minges Coliseum (5,013); Greenville, NC
March 2; 7:00pm		at UCF	W 68–66	10–19 (4–11)	UCF Arena (4,644); Orlando, FL
March 6; 7:00pm		Southern Miss	L 75–65	10–20 (4–12)	Williams Arena at Minges Coliseum (3,953); Greenville, NC
Conference USA tournament
March 10; 1:00pm	(10)	vs. (7) Houston; C-USA First Round	L 93–80	10–21	BOK Center; Tulsa, OK
*Non-conference game. ^{#}Rankings from AP Poll. (#) Tournament seedings in parentheses. All times are in Eastern Standard Time.
