= 2009–10 Marshall Thundering Herd men's basketball team =

American college basketball season

2009–10 Marshall Thundering Herd men's basketball

CIT, Quarterfinals
- Conference: Conference USA
- Record: 24–10 (11–5 C-USA)
- Head coach: Donnie Jones (3rd season)
- Assistant coaches: Shawn Finney; Darren Tillis; Brett Nelson
- Home arena: Cam Henderson Center

2009–10 Conference USA men's basketball standings
	Conf.				Overall
Team	W		L	PCT	W		L	PCT
UTEP	15	–	1	.938	26	–	7	.788
Memphis	13	–	3	.813	24	–	10	.706
UAB	11	–	5	.688	25	–	9	.735
Marshall	11	–	5	.688	24	–	10	.706
Tulsa	10	–	6	.625	23	–	12	.657
Southern Miss	8	–	8	.500	20	–	13	.606
Houston†	7	–	9	.438	19	–	16	.543
SMU	7	–	9	.438	14	–	17	.452
East Carolina	4	–	12	.250	10	–	21	.323
Tulane	3	–	13	.188	8	–	22	.267
Rice	1	–	15	.063	8	–	23	.258
UCF*	0	–	10	.000	0	–	17	.000
† 2010 CUSA Tournament winner As of March 20, 2010; Rankings from AP Poll; *UCF vacated its wins from the 2010–11 season after it was discovered that there was an ineligible player on the team.

The 2009–10 Marshall Thundering Herd men's basketball team represented Marshall University in the 2009–10 college basketball season as a member of Conference USA (C-USA). They played their home games at the Cam Henderson Center and were led by fourth year head coach Donnie Jones.

== Roster ==
Number	Name	Position	Height	Weight	Year	Hometown
0	Darryl Merthie	Guard	6–0	190	Senior	Sanford, Florida
1	Antonio Haymon	Forward	6–6	220	Junior	Memphis, Tennessee
2	Camden Miller	Forward	6–8	210	RS Sophomore	Wheelersburg, Ohio
3	Damier Pitts	Guard	5–10	165	Sophomore	Charlotte, North Carolina
10	Dago Peña	Guard/Forward	6–6	220	Sophomore	Santo Domingo, Dominican Republic
11	Bobby Horodyski	Guard	5–10	170	Freshman	Gainesville, Florida
14	Chris Lutz	Guard	6–3	190	RS Senior	Bedford, New Hampshire
15	Noah Fischer	Guard	6–3	180	Freshman	Ripley, West Virginia
21	Hassan Whiteside	Forward/Center	6–11	235	Freshman	Gastonia, North Carolina
23	Shaquille Johnson	Guard	6–3	205	Sophomore	Jacksonville, Florida
24	DeAndre Kane	Guard	6–4	200	Freshman	Pittsburgh, Pennsylvania
30	Tirrell Baines	Forward	6–6	220	Junior	Laurens, South Carolina
32	Tyler Wilkerson	Forward	6–8	240	Senior	Lexington, Kentucky
34	Eladio Espinosa	Forward	6–7	220	RS Sophomore	Norlina, North Carolina
45	Nigel Spikes	Forward	6–10	220	Sophomore	Fort Lauderdale, Florida

== Schedule ==
Date time, TV	Rank^{#}	Opponent^{#}	Result	Record	Site (attendance) city, state
Exhibition
November 10, 2009*; 7:00 pm		West Virginia Wesleyan	W 108–64	0–0	Cam Henderson Center (N/A); Huntington, West Virginia
Regular season
November 15, 2009*; 2:00 pm		North Carolina A&T; Global Sports Invitational	W 79–63	1–0	Cam Henderson Center (4,319); Huntington, West Virginia
November 17, 2009*; 7:00 pm		Middle Tennessee; Global Sports Invitational	W 63–60	2–0	Cam Henderson Center (4,598); Huntington, West Virginia
November 21, 2009*; 7:00 pm		at Old Dominion	L 62–70	2–1	Ted Constant Convocation Center (7,141); Norfolk, Virginia
November 25, 2009*; 7:00 pm		Lamar; Global Sports Invitational	W 87–74	3–1	Cam Henderson Center (4,478); Huntington, West Virginia
November 28, 2009*; 7:30 pm		vs. Ohio; Global Sports Invitational	W 60–53	4–1	Charleston Civic Center (2,515); Charleston, West Virginia
December 3, 2009*; 7:00 pm		Salem International	W 119–35	5–1	Cam Henderson Center (4,503); Huntington, West Virginia
December 7, 2009*; 7:00 pm		at Binghamton	W 69–55	6–1	Binghamton University Events Center (2,945); Binghamton, New York
December 12, 2009*; 7:00 pm		Troy	W 99–70	7–1	Cam Henderson Center (5,145); Huntington, West Virginia
December 16, 2009*; 7:00 pm		Brescia	W 105–54	8–1	Cam Henderson Center (4,187); Huntington, West Virginia
December 20, 2009*; 7:00 pm		High Point	W 109–76	9–1	Cam Henderson Center (4,541); Huntington, West Virginia
December 22, 2009*; 7:00 pm, FSN		at No. 10 North Carolina	L 61–98	9–2	Dean Smith Center (18,842); Chapel Hill, North Carolina
December 28, 2009*; 8:00 pm		at Troy	W 78–75	10–2	Sartain Hall (1,697); Troy, AL
January 2, 2010*; 2:00 pm		St. Bonaventure	W 80–61	11–2	Cam Henderson Center (5,005); Huntington, West Virginia
January 5, 2010; 7:00 pm		Southern Miss	W 76–63	12–2 (1–0)	Cam Henderson Center (4,745); Huntington, West Virginia
January 9, 2010; 7:00 pm		at East Carolina	W 83–65	13–2 (2–0)	Williams Arena at Minges Coliseum (4,405); Greenville, North Carolina
January 13, 2010; 8:00 pm, CBSCS		at UCF	W 81–75	14–2 (3–0)	UCF Arena (9,460); Orlando, Florida
January 16, 2010; 7:00 pm		Tulane	W 89–79	15–2 (4–0)	Cam Henderson Center (7,243); Huntington, West Virginia
January 20, 2010*; 9:00 pm, WOWK		vs. No. 11 West Virginia; Chesapeake Energy Capital Classic	L 60–68	15–3	Charleston Civic Center (12,380); Charleston, West Virginia
January 23, 2010; 7:00 pm, CSS		UAB	L 59–61	15–4 (4–1)	Cam Henderson Center (8,111); Huntington, West Virginia
January 27, 2010; 8:00 pm, CBSCS		Memphis	L 72–75	15–5 (4–2)	Cam Henderson Center (7,091); Huntington, West Virginia
January 30, 2010; 6:00 pm, CSS		at Houston	L 66–81	15–6 (4–3)	Hofheinz Pavilion (4,457); Houston, Texas
February 3, 2010; 8:00 pm		at Tulsa	L 69–73	15–7 (4–4)	Reynolds Center (5,308); Tulsa, Oklahoma
February 6, 2010; 7:00 pm		East Carolina	W 100–49	16–7 (5–4)	Cam Henderson Center (5,603); Huntington, West Virginia
February 9, 2010*; 7:00 pm		Rio Grande	W 115–73	17–7	Cam Henderson Center (4,179); Huntington, West Virginia
February 13, 2010; 8:00 pm		at UAB	W 81–74	18–7 (6–4)	Bartow Arena (6,189); Birmingham, AL
February 17, 2010; 7:00 pm		Tulsa	W 64–58	19–7 (7–4)	Cam Henderson Center (5,324); Huntington, West Virginia
February 20, 2010; 8:00 pm, WOWK		at Tulane	W 58–55	20–7 (8–4)	Devlin Fieldhouse (1,596); New Orleans
February 24, 2010; 8:00 pm		at Rice	W 77–54	21–7 (9–4)	Tudor Fieldhouse (1,369); Houston, Texas
February 27, 2010; 7:00 pm		UCF	W 121–115 ^{3OT}	22–7 (10–4)	Cam Henderson Center (7,803); Huntington, West Virginia
March 2, 2010; 7:00 pm		No. 24 UTEP	L 76–80	22–8 (10–5)	Cam Henderson Center (7,894); Huntington, West Virginia
March 6, 2010; 8:00 pm		at SMU	W 73–57	23–8 (11–5)	Moody Coliseum (2,553); University Park, Texas
2010 C-USA Basketball tournament
March 11, 2010; 7:30 pm, CBSCS	(4)	vs. (5) Tulsa; Quarterfinals	L 64–80	23–9	BOK Center (N/A); Tulsa, Oklahoma
2010 CollegeInsider.com Postseason Tournament
March 16, 2010*; 7:00 pm		Western Carolina; First Round	W 90–88	24–9	Cam Henderson Center (5,003); Huntington, West Virginia
March 22, 2010*; 7:00 pm		Appalachian State; Quarterfinals	L 72–80	24–10	Cam Henderson Center (4,371); Huntington, West Virginia
*Non-conference game. ^{#}Rankings from AP poll. (#) Tournament seedings in parentheses. All times are in Eastern Time.
