= 2010 Conference USA men's basketball tournament =

Men's basketball tournament held in the USA in the year 2010

- Tournament logo
- Classification: Division I
- Season: 2009–10
- Teams: 12
- Site: BOK Center; Tulsa, Oklahoma
- Champions: Houston (1st title)
- Winning coach: Tom Penders (1st title)
- MVP: Kelvin Lewis (Houston)
- Television: CBS College Sports; CBS

2009–10 Conference USA men's basketball standings
	Conf.				Overall
Team	W		L	PCT	W		L	PCT
UTEP	15	–	1	.938	26	–	7	.788
Memphis	13	–	3	.813	24	–	10	.706
UAB	11	–	5	.688	25	–	9	.735
Marshall	11	–	5	.688	24	–	10	.706
Tulsa	10	–	6	.625	23	–	12	.657
Southern Miss	8	–	8	.500	20	–	13	.606
Houston†	7	–	9	.438	19	–	16	.543
SMU	7	–	9	.438	14	–	17	.452
East Carolina	4	–	12	.250	10	–	21	.323
Tulane	3	–	13	.188	8	–	22	.267
Rice	1	–	15	.063	8	–	23	.258
UCF*	0	–	10	.000	0	–	17	.000
† 2010 CUSA Tournament winner As of March 20, 2010; Rankings from AP Poll; *UCF vacated its wins from the 2010–11 season after it was discovered that there was an ineligible player on the team.

The 2010 Conference USA men's basketball tournament took place March 10–13, 2010, at the BOK Center in Tulsa, Oklahoma. The tournament was won by #7 seed Houston who received an automatic bid to the NCAA tournament. All Quarterfinal and semifinal games were broadcast on CBS College Sports and the championship game was broadcast on CBS. Houston's Kelvin Lewis was declared the tournament's MVP. Houston's Aubrey Coleman, Southern Mississippi's Gary Flowers, and UTEP's Randy Culpepper and Arnett Moultrie joined Lewis on the all-tournament team.

== Bracket ==
First round March 10
8	SMU	53
9	UCF	69
5	Tulsa	73
12	Rice	62
7	Houston	93
10	East Carolina	80
6	Southern Miss	57
11	Tulane	47

Second round March 11
1	UTEP (#25)	76
9	UCF	54
4	Marshall	64
5	Tulsa	80
2	Memphis	65
7	Houston	66
3	UAB	44
6	Southern Miss	58

Semifinals; March 12
1	UTEP (#25)	75
5	Tulsa	61
6	Southern Miss	66
7	Houston	74

Championship Game; March 13
1	UTEP (#25)	73
7	Houston	81

Asterisk denotes game ended in overtime.
Rankings from the AP poll.
