= 2009–10 UTEP Miners men's basketball team =

American college basketball season

2009–10 UTEP Miners men's basketball

C-USA Regular Season Champions

NCAA tournament, Round of 64
- Conference: Conference USA
- Record: 26–7 (15–1 C-USA)
- Head coach: Tony Barbee
- Assistant coaches: Randall Dickey; Tony Madlock; Milt Wagner
- Home arena: Don Haskins Center

2009–10 Conference USA men's basketball standings
	Conf.				Overall
Team	W		L	PCT	W		L	PCT
UTEP	15	–	1	.938	26	–	7	.788
Memphis	13	–	3	.813	24	–	10	.706
UAB	11	–	5	.688	25	–	9	.735
Marshall	11	–	5	.688	24	–	10	.706
Tulsa	10	–	6	.625	23	–	12	.657
Southern Miss	8	–	8	.500	20	–	13	.606
Houston†	7	–	9	.438	19	–	16	.543
SMU	7	–	9	.438	14	–	17	.452
East Carolina	4	–	12	.250	10	–	21	.323
Tulane	3	–	13	.188	8	–	22	.267
Rice	1	–	15	.063	8	–	23	.258
UCF*	0	–	10	.000	0	–	17	.000
† 2010 CUSA Tournament winner As of March 20, 2010; Rankings from AP Poll; *UCF vacated its wins from the 2010–11 season after it was discovered that there was an ineligible player on the team.

The 2009–10 UTEP Miners men's basketball team represented the University of Texas at El Paso in the 2009–10 college basketball season. This was head coach Tony Barbee's fourth season at UTEP. The Miners competed in Conference USA and played their home games at the Don Haskins Center. They finished the season 26–7, 15–1 in CUSA play to win the regular season championship. They advanced to the championship game of the 2010 Conference USA men's basketball tournament before losing to Houston. They received an at–large bid to the 2010 NCAA Division I men's basketball tournament, earning a 12 seed in the west region, where they lost to 5 seed and AP #11 Butler in the first round. UTEP averaged 8,697 fans per game, ranking 58th nationally.

== Roster ==
#	Name	Height	Weight (lbs.)	Position	Class	Hometown	Previous team(s)
1	Arnett Moultrie	6'11"	225	F	So.	Memphis, TN, U.S.	Raleigh-Egypt HS
2	Tyler Tafoya	6'3"	160	G	Fr.	El Paso, TX, U.S.	El Paso HS
3	Randy Culpepper	6'0"	165	G	Jr.	Memphis, TN, U.S.	Sheffield HS
4	Derrick Caracter	6'8"	275	F	Jr.	Fanwood, NJ, U.S.	Notre Dame Prep; Louisville
5	Julyan Stone	6'6"	195	G	Jr.	Goleta, CA, U.S.	Dos Pueblos HS
10	Yaw Mensa	6'0"	170	G	Fr.	Houston, TX, U.S.	Thurgood Marshall HS
11	Myron Strong	6'2"	185	G	Jr.	Memphis, TN, U.S.	Hamilton HS; Southwest Tennessee CC
13	Wayne Portalatin	6'10"	240	C	Jr.	Allentown, PA, U.S.	The Patterson School
20	Isaac Gordon	6'5"	210	G	Jr.	Los Angeles, CA, U.S.	Price HS; Mercer
23	Gabriel McCulley	6'7"	225	G/F	Jr.	Memphis, TN, U.S.	Craigmont HS
31	Eric Muñoz	6'7"	200	F	Jr.	El Paso, TX, U.S.	Eastwood HS
32	Claude Britten	6'11"	270	C	Jr.	Baton Rouge, LA, U.S.	Genesis One Christian
34	Jeremy Williams	6'7"	215	F	Jr.	Memphis, TN, U.S.	Hamilton HS; Southwest Tennessee CC
41	Christian Polk	6'3"	200	G	Jr.	Glendale, AZ, U.S.	Deer Valley HS; Arizona State

== Schedule and results ==
- All times are Mountain

Date time, TV	Rank^{#}	Opponent^{#}	Result	Record	Site (attendance) city, state
Exhibition
11/7/2009*; 7:05pm		New Mexico Highlands	W 80–55		Don Haskins Center (6,429); El Paso, TX
12/5/2009*; 7:05pm		University of the Southwest	W 91–51		Don Haskins Center (6,866); El Paso, TX
Regular season
11/13/2009*; 7:05pm		Texas Southern	W 89–70	1–0	Don Haskins Center (6,825); El Paso, TX
11/18/2009*; 7:05pm		Arkansas-Pine Bluff	W 70–52	2–0	Don Haskins Center (7,105); El Paso, TX
11/21/2009*; 7:05pm		Arkansas State	W 82–56	3–0	Don Haskins Center (6,806); El Paso, TX
11/25/2009*; 7:05pm		North Carolina A&T	W 81–66	4–0	Don Haskins Center (7,631); El Paso, TX
12/1/2009*; 7:00pm		at New Mexico State	W 79–58	5–0	Pan American Center (7,195); Las Cruces, NM
12/13/2009*; 7:05pm		New Mexico State	L 80–87	5–1	Don Haskins Center (10,459); El Paso, TX
12/16/2009*; 6:00pm		vs. No. 20 Mississippi	L 81–91 ^{OT}	5–2	DeSoto Civic Center (2,171); Southaven, MS
12/19/2009*; 1:00pm		Alcorn State	W 101–41	6–2	Don Haskins Center (5,974); El Paso, TX
12/21/2009*; 4:30pm, ESPN2		vs. Oklahoma; All-College Basketball Classic	W 89–74	7–2	Ford Center (NA); Oklahoma City, OK
12/28/2009*; 7:00pm		Norfolk State; Sun Bowl Invitational	W 93–56	8–2	Don Haskins Center (6,212); El Paso, TX
12/29/2009*; 7:30pm		Air Force; Sun Bowl Invitational	W 58–47	9–2	Don Haskins Center (8,010); El Paso, TX
1/3/2010*; 7:00pm		at No. 20 Texas Tech	L 78–86	9–3	United Spirit Arena (8,029); Lubbock, TX
1/6/2010; 7:05pm		SMU	W 49–45	10–3 (1–0)	Don Haskins Center (6,852); El Paso, TX
1/9/2010*; 7:00pm, CBSCS		No. 25 BYU	L 77–83	10–4	Don Haskins Center (8,687); El Paso, TX
1/13/2010; 6:00pm		at Houston	L 65–75	10–5 (1–1)	Hofheinz Pavilion (2,862); Houston, TX
1/16/2010; 7:05pm		Southern Mississippi	W 56–49	11–5 (2–1)	Don Haskins Center (6,632); El Paso, TX
1/20/2010; 6:00pm, CBSCS		at Memphis	W 72–67	12–5 (3–1)	FedEx Forum (16,709); Memphis, TN
1/23/2010; 3:00pm		at Central Florida	W 96–59	13–5 (4–1)	UCF Arena (6,413); Orlando, FL
1/27/2010; 7:05pm		Tulane	W 84–71	14–5 (5–1)	Don Haskins Center (7,768); El Paso, TX
1/30/2010; 6:00pm, KVIA		at No. 25 UAB	W 74–65 ^{2OT}	15–5 (6–1)	Bartow Arena (8,533); Birmingham, AL
2/3/2010; 7:05pm, CBSCS		Houston	W 65–58	16–5 (7–1)	Don Haskins Center (10,595); El Paso, TX
2/6/2010; 7:00pm, ESPN2		Tulsa	W 73–59	17–5 (8–1)	Don Haskins Center (12,092); El Paso, TX
2/10/2010; 6:00pm, MetroSports SW		at SMU	W 62–51	18–5 (9–1)	Moody Coliseum (2,965); Dallas, TX
2/13/2010; 7:05pm		East Carolina	W 100–76	19–5 (10–1)	Don Haskins Center (11,794); El Paso, TX
2/20/2010; 6:00pm, CBSCS		at Tulsa	W 78–70	20–5 (11–1)	Reynolds Center (5,837); Tulsa, OK
2/24/2010; 6:00pm, MetroSports SW		at Southern Mississippi	W 59–56	21–5 (12–1)	Reed Green Coliseum (3,326); Hattiesburg, MS
2/27/2010; 7:05pm		Rice	W 78–64	22–5 (13–1)	Don Haskins Center (12,190); El Paso, TX
3/2/2010; 5:00pm	No. 24	at Marshall	W 80–76	23–5 (14–1)	Cam Henderson Center (7,894); Huntington, WV
3/6/2010; 7:05pm	No. 24	UAB	W 52–50	24–5 (15–1)	Don Haskins Center (12,222); El Paso, TX
2010 Conference USA men's basketball tournament
3/11/10; 8:00pm	(1) No. 25	vs. (9) Central Florida; Quarterfinals	W 76–54	25–5	BOK Center (8,130); Tulsa, OK
3/12/10; 3:00pm, CBSCS	(1) No. 25	vs. (5) Tulsa; Semifinals	W 75–61	26–5	BOK Center (NA); Tulsa, OK
3/13/10; 10:30am, CBS	(1) No. 25	vs. (7) Houston; Final	L 73–81	26–6	BOK Center (8,476); Tulsa, OK
2010 NCAA Division I men's basketball tournament
3/18/2010*; 2:45pm, CBS	(12 W)	vs. (5 W) No. 11 Butler; First round	L 59–77	26–7	HP Pavilion (12,712); San Jose, CA
*Non-conference game. ^{#}Rankings from AP Poll. (#) Tournament seedings in parentheses.
