= Tom Penders =

American basketball coach (born 1945)

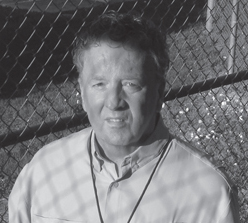

Biographical details
- Born: May 23, 1945 (age 81); Stratford, Connecticut, U.S.

Playing career
- 1964–1967: Connecticut
- Position: Point guard

Coaching career (HC unless noted)
- 1968–1969: Bullard-Havens Technical HS
- 1969–1971: Bridgeport Central HS
- 1971–1974: Tufts
- 1974–1978: Columbia
- 1978–1986: Fordham
- 1986–1988: Rhode Island
- 1988–1998: Texas
- 1998–2001: George Washington
- 2004–2010: Houston

Head coaching record
- Overall: 648–438 (.597)
- Tournaments: 12–11 (NCAA Division I); 1–8 (NIT); 2–2 (CBI)

Accomplishments and honors

Championships
- MAAC tournament (1983); 3 SWC regular season (1992, 1994, 1995); 2 SWC tournament (1994, 1995); A-10 regular season (1999); C-USA tournament (2010)

Awards
- A-10 Coach of the Year (1987); 2x SWC Coach of the Year (1994, 1995)
- College Basketball Hall of Fame; Inducted in 2021

Thomas Vincent Penders (born May 23, 1945) is an American retired college basketball coach, who last coached from 2004 through 2010 at the University of Houston. He is from Stratford, Connecticut and has a 649–437 career record. As a college athlete, Penders played both basketball and baseball for the University of Connecticut, and is one of the few players to have competed in both the NCAA basketball tournament as well as the College World Series.

Prior to his last job as Houston's head coach, Penders was a sports analyst for ESPN and Westwood One Radio. He also has been the head coach for Tufts, Columbia, Fordham, Rhode Island, Texas, and George Washington. Coach Penders developed a reputation as both “Turnaround Tom” and “Tournament Tom” because he proved that he could turn basketball programs into consistent winners and get the most out of his players in March. He is one of three coaches to reach three “Sweet 16s” as a double-digit seed in the NCAA basketball tournament, becoming the first NCAA head basketball coach to accomplish that feat with his 1996–97 Texas Longhorns team.

== Coaching career ==
=== High school ===
Penders posted a 59–10 record as a high school coach at Bullard-Havens Tech and Bridgeport Central High School in Connecticut. He led Bullard-Havens to a 14–6 record in his first season as a head coach. The next year, he guided Bridgeport Central to a 23–2 record and a number two ranking in the state. The following year, he was named the New York Daily News Coach of the Year after leading Bridgeport to a 20–1 mark and a number one ranking.

=== Tufts, Columbia, Fordham ===
Penders began his collegiate coaching career at Tufts University in 1971, and compiled a 54–18 record in three seasons. On October 6, 2006, Penders and his 1972-73 Tufts team were inducted into the New England Basketball Hall of Fame.

He was appointed to succeed Jack Rohan in a similar capacity at Columbia University on April 18, 1974. He led the Lions to back-to-back winning seasons in the final two of his four years there.

After Columbia, Penders moved to Fordham University where he remained for eight years and compiled a 125–114 record. In 1980–81, Penders was named the New York Metropolitan Area Coach of the Year after leading Fordham to a 19–9 record. On January 26, 2013, Penders was inducted into the Fordham Athletic Hall of Fame.

=== Rhode Island ===
Penders took over Rhode Island's program on October 4, 1986, two weeks before the regular season began. He was named the Atlantic 10 Conference Co-Coach of the Year after guiding the Rams to a 20–10 record and a berth into the NIT his first year.

In 1988, Penders led the Rams to the 1988 NCAA Sweet 16 with wins over Missouri and Syracuse before eventually losing to Duke.

=== Texas ===
In his 10 seasons at the University of Texas, Penders compiled a 208–110 record. During his time there, he became the winningest basketball coach in school history (although now passed by former Texas and now Tennessee coach Rick Barnes). He led the Longhorns to three Southwest Conference championships and eight NCAA Tournament appearances, including an Elite Eight in 1990, and the Sweet 16 in 1997. His teams at Texas averaged 20.8 wins per season, 87.2 points per game, and forced 19 turnovers per contest.

When Penders was hired in 1988, he inherited a team that won 16 games the year before; the Erwin Center (the Longhorns' home court) averaged 4,028 fans per game (in a 16,231-seat arena). Immediately after his arrival, Penders switched to a more uptempo offense, and called his team the "Runnin' Horns." His first team finished second in the Southwest Conference and earned a bid to the NCAA Tournament. The Longhorns also set 22 school and SWC records while more than doubling their attendance average to 10,011 per game, the largest increase in NCAA Division I.

In his final year at Texas, Penders underwent heart surgery and was unable to coach the first few games of what would end up being a tumultuous season.

Penders resigned as head coach following nearly a month of controversy surrounding the Texas program. On the heels of a 14-17 season and 9th place finish in the conference, three players met with athletic director DeLoss Dodds to voice complaints about Penders and the program. One of those players, Luke Axtell, informed Dodds at the meeting that he intended to transfer. Not long after the meeting, and despite it being the offseason, Axtell was suspended from the team for academic reasons.

Shortly after the suspension, an Austin radio station that claimed to have obtained a copy of Axtell's transcript read his grades on the air. This touched off a firestorm and an investigation into the source of the unauthorized release of academic records. Penders announced his resignation after the investigation revealed that his assistant coach, Eddie Oran, admitted to faxing the transcript to the radio station. In a deposition connected with a lawsuit Axtell brought against the radio station for releasing his records, Oran testified that Penders instructed him to fax the Axtell transcript to the media (and that a secretary had actually been the faxer). Oran sued Penders for defamation in 2002, claiming that statements Penders made when the scandal broke wrecked his career. However, a jury sided with Penders.

Coach Penders’s departure from Texas was the subject of a book, Burned Orange by Kyle Dalton.

=== George Washington ===
Penders served as head coach at the George Washington University from 1998 to 2001, where he compiled a 49–42 record and led the Colonials to the NCAA tournament.

Penders' only winning season while directing the Colonials was his first, where he inherited a talented team composed mostly of recruits of former Colonial head coach Mike Jarvis. A number of off-court issues followed. Late in the 2000-2001 season, four players used the long-distance access code of his son and assistant coach, Tommy, Jr., to make $1,400 worth of long-distance calls and star guard SirValiant Brown left after his sophomore year for the NBA because he wouldn't qualify to play at GW the next season for academic reasons. Most seriously, Penders failed to tell athletic director Jack Kvancz that one of his players, Attila Cosby, had been arrested for several serious misdemeanors in January, including forcing a prostitute to perform oral sex at gunpoint and violating her with a broom. Penders ultimately resigned in 2001.

Penders said his resignation was because after 30 years of coaching, it was "time for a sabbatical," and said the resignation was not related to the off-the-court issues. The university honored the rest of Penders' contract, with GW athletic director Jack Kvancz said honoring it "was the class thing to do." When GW's Kvancz was questioned about the payout (in the area of $1M) he refused to comment. "

=== Houston ===
Penders came to Houston after spending three years as an analyst for ESPN and Westwood One Radio. In his first season at the University of Houston, Penders guided the Cougars to the nation's fourth-best turnaround with an 18–14 overall record and Houston led the nation in turnover margin and set both team and individual school records for most three-point field goals made in a season.

In his second season, Penders led the Cougars to their first 20-win season, first back-to-back winning seasons, and first back-to-back postseason tournament appearances since 1992–93. He also led Houston to back-to-back wins over nationally ranked teams for the first time since the 1984 NCAA Midwest Regional tournament and their first postseason tournament victory since 1988 in his first two years at the school, in the NIT.

Houston finished the 2005–06 campaign with a 2–2 record against nationally ranked teams after beating No. 25 LSU on November 29 and No. 13 Arizona on December 3 in a nationally televised game on ESPN2. Houston's postseason tournament victory was against BYU in the first round of the 2006 NIT. It also was Penders' first career victory in the NIT. Houston led the nation in steals with a 12.4 average, and the Cougars finished second in turnover margin with an average margin of +7.5.

Penders led the Houston Cougars to the Conference USA championship game in 2010 where they defeated UTEP for their first NCAA Tournament berth in 18 years. This made him only the 8th coach to take 4 different schools to the NCAA tournament.

Penders decided to resign as coach of Houston on March 22, 2010, following a first-round loss to Maryland in the NCAA tournament. He has not coached since.

== Playing career ==
Penders played both baseball and basketball at the University of Connecticut, where he starred as a center fielder for the baseball team and a point guard for the basketball team from 1964 to 1967.

He was the 116th overall selection in the eighth round of the 1968 Major League Baseball (MLB) January Draft by the Cleveland Indians. His professional baseball playing experience lasted one year in the Cleveland organization where he split his 1968 season between the Rock Hill Chiefs and Waterbury Indians.

== Family ==
In addition to Penders and son Tommy, Jr. serving as basketball coaches, his father was a longtime baseball coach at Stratford High School from 1931 to 1968, and led the school to four state championships. His brother, Jim, is the baseball coach at East Catholic High School, and was named the national high school Coach of the Year in 1996. Like his father, Jim Penders won four state championships.

Penders' two nephews also are collegiate baseball coaches. Jim was named the head coach at Connecticut in 2003 after serving seven years as an assistant coach and playing four years for the Huskies. Rob serves as the head baseball coach at St. Edward's University in Austin, Texas.

== Head coaching record ==
Record table
Season	Team	Overall	Conference	Standing	Postseason
Tufts Jumbos (New England Small College Athletic Conference) (1971–1974)
1971–72	Tufts	12–8			
1972–73	Tufts	22–4			
1973–74	Tufts	20–6			
Tufts:		54–18 (.750)			
Columbia Lions (Ivy League) (1974–1978)
1974–75	Columbia	4–22	2–12	T–7th	
1975–76	Columbia	8–17	6–8	T–4th	
1976–77	Columbia	16–10	8–6	3rd	
1977–78	Columbia	15–11	11–3	T–2nd	
Columbia:		43–60 (.417)	27–29 (.482)		
Fordham Rams (New Jersey-New York 7 Conference) (1978–1979)
1978–79	Fordham	7–22	1–5	6th	
Fordham Rams (Eastern Collegiate Athletic Conference Metro) (1979–1981)
1979–80	Fordham	11–17			
1980–81	Fordham	19–9			NIT first round
Fordham Rams (Metro Atlantic Athletic Conference) (1981–1986)
1981–82	Fordham	18–11	8–2	2nd	NIT first round
1982–83	Fordham	19–11	7–3	T–2nd	NIT first round
1983–84	Fordham	19–15	7–7	4th	NIT first round
1984–85	Fordham	19–12	9–5	2nd	NIT first round
1985–86	Fordham	13–17	7–7	T–4th	
Fordham:		125–114 (.523)	39–29 (.574)		
Rhode Island Rams (Atlantic 10 Conference) (1986–1988)
1986–87	Rhode Island	20–10	12–6	3rd	NIT first round
1987–88	Rhode Island	28–7	14–4	2nd	NCAA Division I Sweet 16
Rhode Island:		48–17 (.738)	26–10 (.722)		
Texas Longhorns (Southwest Conference) (1988–1996)
1988–89	Texas	25–9	12–4	2nd	NCAA Division I second round
1989–90	Texas	24–9	12–4	3rd	NCAA Division I Elite Eight
1990–91	Texas	23–9	13–3	2nd	NCAA Division I second round
1991–92	Texas	23–12	11–3	T–1st	NCAA Division I first round
1992–93	Texas	11–17	4–10	7th	
1993–94	Texas	26–8	12–2	1st	NCAA Division I second round
1994–95	Texas	23–7	11–3	T–1st	NCAA Division I second round
1995–96	Texas	21–10	10–4	3rd	NCAA Division I second round
Texas Longhorns (Big 12 Conference) (1996–1998)
1996–97	Texas	18–12	10–6	T–3rd	NCAA Division I Sweet 16
1997–98	Texas	14–17	6–10	10th	
Texas:		208–110 (.654)	101–49 (.673)		
George Washington Colonials (Atlantic 10 Conference) (1998–2001)
1998–99	George Washington	20–9	13–3	1st (West)	NCAA Division I first round
1999–00	George Washington	15–15	9–7	T–2nd (West)	
2000–01	George Washington	14–18	6–10	7th	
George Washington:		49–42 (.538)	28–20 (.583)		
Houston Cougars (Conference USA) (2004–2010)
2004–05	Houston	18–14	9–7	T–6th	NIT first round
2005–06	Houston	21–10	9–5	4th	NIT second round
2006–07	Houston	18–15	10–6	3rd	
2007–08	Houston	24–10	11–5	3rd	CBI semifinal
2008–09	Houston	21–12	10–6	T–4th	CBI first round
2009–10	Houston	19–16	7–9	T–7th	NCAA Division I first round
Houston:		121–77 (.611)	56–38 (.596)		
Total:		648–438 (.597)			
National champion Postseason invitational champion Conference regular season champion Conference regular season and conference tournament champion Division regular season champion Division regular season and conference tournament champion Conference tournament champion

== See also ==
- List of college men's basketball coaches with 600 wins
