= 2009–10 North Carolina Tar Heels men's basketball team =

American college basketball season

2009–10 North Carolina Tar Heels men's basketball

NIT, Runner-Up
- Conference: Atlantic Coast Conference
- Record: 20–17 (5–11 ACC)
- Head coach: Roy Williams (7th season)
- Assistant coaches: Steve Robinson; C. B. McGrath; Jerod Haase
- Home arena: Dean Smith Center (regular season); Carmichael Arena (2010 NIT)

2009–10 ACC men's basketball standings
	Conf.				Overall
Team	W		L	PCT	W		L	PCT
No. 3 Duke †	13	–	3	.813	35	–	5	.875
No. 20 Maryland	13	–	3	.813	24	–	9	.727
Florida State	10	–	6	.625	22	–	10	.688
Virginia Tech	10	–	6	.625	25	–	9	.735
Wake Forest	9	–	7	.563	20	–	10	.667
Clemson	9	–	7	.563	21	–	11	.656
Georgia Tech	7	–	9	.438	23	–	13	.639
Boston College	6	–	10	.375	15	–	16	.484
Virginia	5	–	11	.313	15	–	16	.484
North Carolina	5	–	11	.313	20	–	17	.541
NC State	5	–	11	.313	20	–	16	.556
Miami (FL)	4	–	12	.250	20	–	13	.606
† 2010 ACC tournament winner As of March 19, 2010; Rankings from AP Poll

The 2009–10 North Carolina Tar Heels men's basketball team represented the University of North Carolina at Chapel Hill. Their head coach was Roy Williams. The team played their home games in the Dean Smith Center in Chapel Hill, North Carolina, and were a member of the Atlantic Coast Conference. They were the defending National Champions. This was the 100th season of basketball in the school's history.

The Tar Heels finished the season 20–17, 5–11 in ACC play, and lost in the first round of the 2010 ACC men's basketball tournament. They received an invitation to the 2010 National Invitation Tournament, where they advanced to the championship game before falling to Dayton.

== Preseason ==
The Tar Heels lost four starters from their 2008–09 Championship team and top backcourt reserve Bobby Frasor. Tyler Hansbrough, the Atlantic Coast Conference all-time leading scorer, was selected in the lottery of the 2009 NBA draft, going #13 to the Indiana Pacers. ACC Player of the Year Ty Lawson and 2009 NCAA tournament Most Outstanding Player Wayne Ellington also were drafted in the first round, by the Denver Nuggets and Minnesota Timberwolves, respectively. Senior swingman Danny Green was also drafted by the Cleveland Cavaliers in the second round.

Top returnees were senior center Deon Thompson, who spent the summer helping lead Team USA to a bronze at the World University Games and sophomore Ed Davis, who had been projected as a first-round draft pick. Reserve sophomores Larry Drew II and Tyler Zeller also returned, and junior swingman Will Graves was reinstated over the summer after a mid-season suspension by coach Roy Williams. Also returning was defensive stopper Marcus Ginyard, who took a medical redshirt for the 2008–09 campaign after starting as a junior for the 2007–08 Tar Heel team, who advanced to the Final Four. Joining the returnees was a recruiting class containing four McDonald's All-Americans and ranked as one of the top 5 in the nation.

Despite the heavy losses for the defending champions, the Tar Heels were ranked in the top ten of both preseason polls when they were released on October 29, even garnering a single vote for #1 in both the AP Poll and the Coaches Poll. UNC was ranked #6 in the AP and #4 in the Coaches Poll. The Tar Heels were also picked as the ACC pre-season favorite (with rival Duke) by the conference media, while Davis was chosen as a member of the preseason All-ACC Team.

Other preseason honors for Tar Heel players included the inclusion of Davis and Thompson on the 50-man Wooden Award preseason candidate list. Davis was also one of the 50 players named to the Naismith watch list. Marcus Ginyard was named a preseason candidate for the Lowe's Senior CLASS Award, one of only two ACC players named to the 30-man list (with Duke's Jon Scheyer).

=== 100th anniversary celebration ===
UNC kicked off their 100th season with an alumni game on September 4, featuring NBA players Vince Carter, Antawn Jamison and Marvin Williams. At halftime, the 2009 National Championship banner was unveiled, and UNC legend Michael Jordan was honored for his election to the Basketball Hall of Fame. The event proved to be an excellent recruiting tool for UNC, as 2011 forward prospect James McAdoo committed to North Carolina at the event, and Harrison Barnes, the 2010 #1 recruit in the ESPNU and Scout.com rankings, later committed to UNC after attending the event. Members of the 2009 championship team received their championship rings at halftime of the UNC-Citadel football game on September 5.

In their season opener against Florida International, the Tar Heels donned throwback uniforms in the style of the 1957 undefeated national championship team, with distinctive red trim. They wore the 1957 throwback uniforms again when they played Rutgers on December 28.

=== Recruiting ===
Coach Roy Williams signed a five-person class for 2009, including two-time Tennessee Division II-AA Mr. Basketball Leslie McDonald from Memphis, identical twins David and Travis Wear from California, and athletic combo guard Dexter Strickland from New Jersey. The crown jewel of the class was 6'10 forward John Henson of Tampa, Florida, rated the #1 PF by Scout.com. Henson, Strickland and the Wear twins were all named to the McDonald's game in Miami. Henson and Strickland were also named first-team Parade All-Americans, while McDonald and the Wears were called to the fourth team by the magazine.

College recruiting
Name	Hometown	School	Height	Weight	Commit date
John Henson; PF	Tampa, Florida	Sickles (FL)	6 ft 10 in (2.08 m)	200 lb (91 kg)	Jan 3, 2008
John Henson; PF	Recruit ratings: Scout: Rivals: (98)				
Leslie McDonald; SG	Memphis, Tennessee	Briarcrest Christian School (TN)	6 ft 4 in (1.93 m)	185 lb (84 kg)	Jun 9, 2008
Leslie McDonald; SG	Recruit ratings: Scout: Rivals: (95)				
Dexter Strickland; SG	Elizabeth, New Jersey	St. Patrick (NJ)	6 ft 3 in (1.91 m)	175 lb (79 kg)	Jan 13, 2008
Dexter Strickland; SG	Recruit ratings: Scout: Rivals: (95)				
David Wear; PF	Santa Ana, California	Mater Dei (CA)	6 ft 9 in (2.06 m)	225 lb (102 kg)	Jan 4, 2008
David Wear; PF	Recruit ratings: Scout: Rivals: (94)				
Travis Wear; PF	Santa Ana, California	Mater Dei (CA)	6 ft 9 in (2.06 m)	225 lb (102 kg)	Jan 4, 2008
Travis Wear; PF	Recruit ratings: Scout: Rivals: (94)				
Overall recruit ranking: Scout: 3 Rivals: 5 ESPN: 2
Note: In many cases, Scout, Rivals, 247Sports, On3, and ESPN may conflict in their listings of height and weight.; In these cases, the average was taken. ESPN grades are on a 100-point scale.; Sources: "North Carolina Basketball Commitments". Rivals.; "2009 North Carolina Basketball Commits". Scout.; "ESPN". ESPN.; "Scout.com Team Recruiting Rankings". Scout.; "2009 Team Ranking". Rivals.

== Season ==
=== Non-conference season ===
UNC kicked off their non-conference schedule on November 9 against Florida International and new coach Isiah Thomas as a part of the Coaches Vs. Cancer Classic, defeating the Golden Panthers 88–72 at the Dean Smith Center. There had been some controversy surrounding the game, as FIU had threatened to pull out of the tournament when the brackets were released, and they found that they were not scheduled to play Ohio State as they had initially planned.

After home wins over North Carolina Central and Valparaiso, the Tar Heels began a tough out-of-conference slate which included five teams ranked in the preseason Coaches Poll. First was a trip to Madison Square Garden for the finals of the Coaches Vs. Cancer Classic. After defeating #15 Ohio State 77–73 in their semifinal game, the Tar Heels lost the championship game 87–71 to #24 Syracuse. UNC had a two-point lead at the half, but the Orange used a 25–3 run coming out of the locker room to defeat the young Tar Heels convincingly behind 25 points from forwarding Wesley Johnson.

In a 93–72 home win over Gardner-Webb on November 23, 2009, senior Deon Thompson became the 63rd player in UNC history to score 1,000 points. The milestone capped a 22-point, 10-rebound performance from Thompson. Gardner-Webb guard Grayson Flittner also tied a Dean Smith Center record with nine three-pointers. In their next game it was Roy Williams' turn to achieve a milestone, as he won his 600th game in the Tar Heels' 80–73 win over Nevada.

Next up was #9 Michigan State in Chapel Hill as a part of the ACC – Big Ten Challenge. In this rematch of the 2009 NCAA title game, they again beat the Spartans 89–82 behind Ed Davis' 22 points and Larry Drew II's 18 points and six assists. The next game got no more comfortable, as UNC traveled to Rupp Arena to face the #5 Kentucky Wildcats. The Tar Heels fell behind early as UK freshman John Wall sparked a 28–2 first-half run that punctuated a 15-point halftime deficit. The Tar Heels battled back to make the game close in the second half, but ultimately lost 68–66.

Following the Kentucky game, UNC defeated Presbyterian 103–64 at the Smith Center before traveling to Cowboys Stadium in Dallas to take on the #2 ranked Texas Longhorns in the first basketball game played at that venue. The Longhorns defeated the Tar Heels 103–90 behind Damion James' 25 points and 15 rebounds. Ed Davis had 21 points and nine rebounds in the loss. The Tar Heels bounced back with home wins over Marshall (98–61) and Rutgers (81–67). The Carolina front line of Davis, Thompson, Graves, and Zeller combined for 64 points and 30 rebounds in the win over Marshall, while freshman Dexter Strickland notched 18 in the win over Rutgers in the absence of Marcus Ginyard, who sat out the game with an ankle sprain.

Ginyard also missed the last two non-conference games. In a home contest against Albany, UNC lost junior forward Will Graves to an ankle injury. The Tar Heels won the game, 87–70, but lost both Graves and reserve Justin Watts for their last non-conference game at the College of Charleston. The Tar Heels played a real road game at Carolina First Arena, down two starters. Charleston's Cougars played the Heels shot for shot, sending the game into overtime with an Andrew Goudelock three-pointer. In overtime, the Cougars outscored the Tar Heels to take the game 82–79 in a big upset. Ed Davis had 19 points, 16 rebounds and five blocks in the losing effort.

=== Conference season ===
The Tar Heels entered conference play by hosting the Virginia Tech Hokies. The Tar Heels returned injured starters, Will Graves and Marcus Ginyard, while the Hokies welcomed back their star Malcolm Delaney. Delaney lived up to his preseason All-ACC billing, scoring 20 points in the first half as Virginia Tech led 38–34 at the intermission. Larry Drew II, Will Graves and Ed Davis led a strong second half effort to take the Tar Heels to a 78–64 win.

The next three games were not as positive for the Tar Heels. They were beaten convincingly by Clemson 83–64 in a game that saw UNC commit 26 turnovers. The Tar Heels showed signs of life in their next match against Georgia Tech. After trailing the Yellow Jackets by as much as 20, UNC came storming back to take the lead with under a minute to play, behind Will Graves' 24 points. However, Georgia Tech scored the last three aspects of the game to get the win. The Tar Heels looked to get back to their winning ways against Wake Forest at home, but were outscored in both halves, losing 82–69. This was the first time Roy Williams had lost three games in a row as Tar Heels head coach. The loss knocked the Tar Heels out of the national rankings for the first time since 2006.

The Tar Heels were not able to achieve any real consistency for the remainder of the season, going only 4–8 for the rest of the way. While they did manage to sweep rival North Carolina State, they were swept by Duke, including an 82–50 flogging to close the season. They finished 5–11 in conference play—only the fourth losing ACC record UNC has ever suffered, and easily the worst conference record in Williams' 22 years as a head coach. They also finished tied for ninth in the conference standings, their third-ever finish below fourth in ACC play.

The Tar Heels briefly showed signs of life in the first half of the ACC tournament against Georgia Tech, gaining an early lead, but a second-half swoon resulted in a 62–58 loss.

=== Postseason ===
The Tar Heels were left out of the 2010 NCAA Tournament, becoming the first defending national champion since Florida's 2007–08 unit to not make the next year's tournament while eligible to compete. They were, however, selected for the 2010 National Invitation Tournament, their first appearance in that tourney since 2003. Despite a 16–16 record, the Tar Heels were a #4 seed, allowing them to host a first-round game against William & Mary. The game was played in the Tar Heels' former home, Carmichael Arena, due to renovations at the Smith Center. After defeating William & Mary, the Tar Heels won road games at Mississippi State and UAB and advanced to the tournament's semi-finals in Madison Square Garden where they defeated Rhode Island in overtime. In the NIT championship game, they lost to Dayton 79–68 to close the season at 20–17. The 17 losses were the second-most in school history.

On April 1, Deon Thompson appeared in the NIT Championship game, giving him 152 career game appearances. This set the NCAA all-time career games played mark, formerly held by Wayne Turner of Kentucky and Walter Hodge of Florida.

== Roster ==
2009–10 North Carolina Tar Heels men's basketball team
Players
Coaches

Pos.	#	Name	Height	Weight	Year	Previous school	Hometown
G	2	Marc Campbell	5 ft 11 in (1.8 m)	175 lb (79 kg)	Sr	Ravenscroft	Raleigh, NC
F	32	Ed Davis	6 ft 10 in (2.08 m)	220 lb (100 kg)	So	Benedictine	Richmond, VA
G	11	Larry Drew II	6 ft 1 in (1.85 m)	180 lb (82 kg)	So	Woodland Hills Taft	Encino, CA
G	1	Marcus Ginyard	6 ft 5 in (1.96 m)	210 lb (95 kg)	RS Sr	Bishop O'Connell	Alexandria, VA
F	13	Will Graves	6 ft 6 in (1.98 m)	240 lb (109 kg)	Jr	Dudley	Greensboro, NC
F	31	John Henson	6 ft 10 in (2.08 m)	195 lb (88 kg)	Fr	Sickles	Tampa, FL
G	15	Leslie McDonald	6 ft 4 in (1.93 m)	215 lb (98 kg)	Fr	Briarcrest Christian School	Memphis, TN
G	14	Terrence Petree	6 ft 3 in (1.91 m)	165 lb (75 kg)	Sr	North Forsyth	Winston-Salem, NC
G	5	Dexter Strickland	6 ft 3 in (1.91 m)	180 lb (82 kg)	Fr	St. Patrick	Rahway, NJ
F	21	Deon Thompson	6 ft 9 in (2.06 m)	245 lb (111 kg)	Sr	Torrance	Torrance, CA
G	30	Thomas Thornton	6 ft 3 in (1.91 m)	180 lb (82 kg)	Sr	Grimsley	Greensboro, NC
G	24	Justin Watts	6 ft 4 in (1.93 m)	210 lb (95 kg)	So	Jordan	Durham, NC
F	34	David Wear	6 ft 10 in (2.08 m)	225 lb (102 kg)	Fr	Mater Dei	Huntington Beach, CA
F	43	Travis Wear	6 ft 10 in (2.08 m)	235 lb (107 kg)	Fr	Mater Dei	Huntington Beach, CA
F	44	Tyler Zeller	7 ft 0 in (2.13 m)	240 lb (109 kg)	So	Oakland Technical Senior	Washington, IN

Head coach

Roy Williams

Assistant coach(es)

Steve Robinson
C. B. McGrath
Jerod Haase

Legend

- (C) Team captain
- (S) Suspended
- (I) Ineligible
- (W) Walk-on
- Injured
- Current redshirt

Roster
Last update: October 31, 2012

== Schedule ==
Date time, TV	Rank^{#}	Opponent^{#}	Result	Record	Site (attendance) city, state
Exhibition
11/06/09*; 7:30 p.m.	No. 6	Belmont Abbey	W 107–59		Dean Smith Center (18,137); Chapel Hill, NC
Non-conference regular season
11/09/09*; 7:00 p.m., ESPNU	No. 6	Florida International; 2K Sports Coaches vs. Cancer Classic	W 88–72	1–0	Dean Smith Center (16,161); Chapel Hill, NC
11/11/09*; 9:00 p.m., ESPNU	No. 6	North Carolina Central; 2K Sports Coaches vs. Cancer Classic	W 89–42	2–0	Dean Smith Center (14,576); Chapel Hill, NC
11/15/09*; 4:00 p.m., FSS	No. 6	Valparaiso	W 88–77	3–0	Dean Smith Center (17,020); Chapel Hill, NC
11/19/09*; 9:15 p.m., ESPN2	No. 6	vs. No. 15 Ohio State; 2K Sports Coaches vs. Cancer Classic	W 77–73	4–0	Madison Square Garden (15,635); New York, NY
11/20/09*; 7:15 p.m., ESPN2	No. 6	vs. Syracuse; 2K Sports Coaches vs. Cancer Classic	L 87–71	4–1	Madison Square Garden (15,552); New York, NY
11/23/09*; 7:30 p.m., FSS	No. 11	Gardner-Webb	W 93–72	5–1	Dean Smith Center (17,005); Chapel Hill, NC
11/29/09*; 7:45 p.m., FSN	No. 11	Nevada	W 80–73	6–1	Dean Smith Center (17,321); Chapel Hill, NC
12/02/09*; 9:00 p.m., ESPN	No. 10	No. 9 Michigan St. ACC – Big Ten Challenge	W 89–82	7–1	Dean Smith Center (21,346); Chapel Hill, NC
12/05/09*; 12:30 p.m., CBS	No. 10	at No. 5 Kentucky	L 68–66	7–2	Rupp Arena (24,468); Lexington, KY
12/12/09*; 7:30 p.m.	No. 11	Presbyterian	W 103–64	8–2	Dean Smith Center (18,596); Chapel Hill, NC
12/19/09*; 2:00 p.m., ESPN	No. 10	vs. No. 2 Texas	L 103–90	8–3	Cowboys Stadium (38,052); Arlington, TX
12/22/09*; 7:00 p.m., FSS/NESN	No. 10	Marshall	W 98–61	9–3	Dean Smith Center (18,842); Chapel Hill, NC
12/28/09*; 8:30 p.m., ESPN2	No. 9	Rutgers	W 81–67	10–3	Dean Smith Center (21,023); Chapel Hill, NC
12/30/09*; 7:30 p.m., ESPNU	No. 9	Albany	W 87–70	11–3	Dean Smith Center (19,225); Chapel Hill, NC
1/4/10*; 7:00 p.m., ESPNU	No. 9	at College of Charleston	L 82–79 ^{OT}	11–4	Carolina First Arena (5,072); Charleston, SC
ACC regular season
1/10/10; 7:45 p.m., FSN	No. 9	Virginia Tech	W 78–64	12–4 (1–0)	Dean Smith Center (20,581); Chapel Hill, NC
1/13/10; 9:00 p.m., ESPN	No. 12	at No. 24 Clemson	L 83–64	12–5 (1–1)	Littlejohn Coliseum (10,000); Clemson, SC
1/16/10; 2:00 p.m., ESPN	No. 12	No. 20 Georgia Tech	L 73–71	12–6 (1–2)	Dean Smith Center (20,704); Chapel Hill, NC
1/20/10; 7:00 p.m., ESPN	No. 24	Wake Forest	L 82–69	12–7 (1–3)	Dean Smith Center (20,235); Chapel Hill, NC
1/26/10; 9:00 p.m., Raycom		at North Carolina State; Carolina – NC State rivalry	W 77–63	13–7 (2–3)	RBC Center (19,700); Raleigh, NC
1/31/10; 7:45 p.m., FSN		Virginia	L 75–60	13–8 (2–4)	Dean Smith Center (14,437); Chapel Hill, NC
2/4/10; 9:00 p.m., Raycom		at Virginia Tech	L 74–70	13–9 (2–5)	Cassell Coliseum (9,847); Blacksburg, VA
2/7/10; 2:00 p.m., FSN		at Maryland	L 92–71	13–10 (2–6)	Comcast Center (17,950); College Park, MD
2/10/10; 9:00 p.m., ESPN/ Raycom		No. 8 Duke; Carolina–Duke rivalry	L 64–54	13–11 (2–7)	Dean Smith Center (21,750); Chapel Hill, NC
2/13/10; 4:00 p.m., ESPN		North Carolina State; Carolina – NC State rivalry	W 74–61	14–11 (3–7)	Dean Smith Center (19,786); Chapel Hill, NC
2/16/10; 9:00 p.m., Raycom		at Georgia Tech	L 68–51	14–12 (3–8)	Alexander Memorial Coliseum (9,191); Atlanta, GA
2/20/10; 12:00 p.m., CBS		at Boston College	L 71–67	14–13 (3–9)	Conte Forum (8,128); Chestnut Hill, MA
2/24/10; 7:00 p.m., ESPN		Florida State	L 77–67	14–14 (3–10)	Dean Smith Center (15,779); Chapel Hill, NC
2/27/10; 2:00 p.m., CBS		at Wake Forest	W 77–68	15–14 (4–10)	LJVM Coliseum (14,510); Winston-Salem, NC
3/2/10; 8:00 p.m., Raycom		Miami (FL)	W 69–62	16–14 (5–10)	Dean Smith Center (16,725); Chapel Hill, NC
3/6/10; 9:00 p.m., ESPN		at No. 4 Duke; Carolina–Duke rivalry, ESPN College GameDay	L 82–50	16–15 (5–11)	Cameron Indoor Stadium (9,314); Durham, NC
ACC tournament
3/11/10; 7:00 p.m., ESPN2		vs. Georgia Tech; First Round	L 58–62	16–16	Greensboro Coliseum (23,381); Greensboro, NC
National Invitation Tournament
3/16/10; 9:30 p.m., ESPN		William & Mary; First Round	W 80–72	17–16	Carmichael Arena (6,822); Chapel Hill, NC
3/20/10; 12:00 p.m., ESPN		at Mississippi State; Second Round	W 76–74	18–16	Humphrey Coliseum (9,471); Starkville, MS
3/23/10; 9:00 p.m., ESPN		at Alabama–Birmingham; Quarterfinals	W 60–55	19–16	Bartow Arena (8,889); Birmingham, AL
3/30/10; 9:00 p.m., ESPN2		vs. Rhode Island; Semifinals	W 68–67 ^{OT}	20–16	Madison Square Garden (11,689); New York, NY
4/1/10; 7:00 p.m., ESPN		vs. Dayton; Championship Game	L 68–79	20–17	Madison Square Garden (9,827); New York, NY
*Non-conference game. ^{#}Rankings from AP Poll. (#) Tournament seedings in parentheses. All times are in Eastern Time.

== Rankings ==
Ranking movements Legend: ██ Increase in ranking ██ Decrease in ranking — = Not ranked RV = Received votes ( ) = First-place votes
	Week																			
Poll	Pre	1	2	3	4	5	6	7	8	9	10	11	12	13	14	15	16	17	18	Final
AP	6 (1)	6	11	10	11	10	10	9	9	12	24	RV	RV	RV	—	—	—	—	—	Not released
Coaches	4 (1)	4 (1)	12	11	10	10	10	9	9	13	23	RV	RV	RV	—	—	—	—	—	—

== Team players drafted into the NBA ==
Year	Round	Pick	Player	NBA club
2010	1	13	Ed Davis	Toronto Raptors
2012	1	14	John Henson	Milwaukee Bucks
2012	1	17	Tyler Zeller	Dallas Mavericks

== See also ==
- 2010 NCAA Division I men's basketball tournament
- 2009–10 NCAA Division I men's basketball season
- 2009–10 NCAA Division I men's basketball rankings
