= 2009–10 Tulsa Golden Hurricane men's basketball team =

American college basketball season

2009–10 Tulsa Golden Hurricane men's basketball

NIT First Round
- Conference: Conference USA
- Record: 23–12 (10–6 C-USA)
- Head coach: Doug Wojcik
- Assistant coaches: David Cason; Jeremy Ballard; Andy Kohut
- Home arena: Reynolds Center

2009–10 Conference USA men's basketball standings
	Conf.				Overall
Team	W		L	PCT	W		L	PCT
UTEP	15	–	1	.938	26	–	7	.788
Memphis	13	–	3	.813	24	–	10	.706
UAB	11	–	5	.688	25	–	9	.735
Marshall	11	–	5	.688	24	–	10	.706
Tulsa	10	–	6	.625	23	–	12	.657
Southern Miss	8	–	8	.500	20	–	13	.606
Houston†	7	–	9	.438	19	–	16	.543
SMU	7	–	9	.438	14	–	17	.452
East Carolina	4	–	12	.250	10	–	21	.323
Tulane	3	–	13	.188	8	–	22	.267
Rice	1	–	15	.063	8	–	23	.258
UCF*	0	–	10	.000	0	–	17	.000
† 2010 CUSA Tournament winner As of March 20, 2010; Rankings from AP Poll; *UCF vacated its wins from the 2010–11 season after it was discovered that there was an ineligible player on the team.

The 2009–10 Tulsa Golden Hurricane men's basketball team represented the University of Tulsa in the 2009–10 college basketball season. This was head coach Doug Wojcik's fifth season at Tulsa. The Golden Hurricane competed in Conference USA and played their home games at the Reynolds Center. They finished the season 23–12, 10–6 in CUSA play, lost in the semifinals of the 2010 Conference USA men's basketball tournament and were invited to the 2010 National Invitation Tournament where they lost in the first round.

== Roster ==
#	Name	Height	Weight (lbs.)	Position	Class	Hometown	Previous Team(s)
1	Ben Uzoh	6'3"	205	G	Sr.	San Antonio, TX, U.S.	Warren HS
2	Bryson Pope	6'6"	210	G/F	Fr.	Jenks, OK, U.S.	Jenks HS
4	Shane Heirman	6'1"	195	G	Jr.	McHenry, IL, U.S.	Marian Central Catholic HS; Marquette
10	Barrett Hunter	6'1"	180	G	Fr.	McLean, VA, U.S.	Langley HS
11	Steven Idlet	6'10"	240	F	So.	Prairie Grove, AR, U.S.	Prairie Grove HS
12	Bishop Wheatley	6'6"	225	F	Sr.	Cedar Hill, TX, U.S.	Cedar Hill HS
13	Donte Medder	6'1"	175	G	Fr.	Phoenix, AZ, U.S.	Mesa HS
14	Will Sanger	6'3"	185	G	Sr.	Seattle, WA, U.S.	Bear Creek HS
15	Justin Hurtt	6'4"	195	G	Jr.	Raytown, MO, U.S.	Archbishop O'Hara HS
22	Glenn Andrews	6'2"	195	G	Jr.	Alexandria, VA, U.S.	T. C. Williams HS
23	Jerome Jordan	7'0"	250	C	Sr.	Kingston, Jamaica	Florida Air Academy
30	Scottie Haralson	6'4"	220	G	So.	Jackson, MS, U.S.	Provine HS; UConn
32	Kodi Maduka	6'10"	210	F	Fr.	Arlington, TX, U.S.	Arlington HS
33	Joe Richard	6'7"	235	F	So.	San Bernardino, CA, U.S.	Arroyo Valley HS
35	D.J. Magley	6'9"	255	F	Jr.	Bradenton, FL, U.S.	Bradenton Christian HS; Western Kentucky
40	Colter Morgan	6'8"	210	F	So.	Big Spring, TX, U.S.	Coahoma HS

== Schedule and results ==
- All times are Central

Date time, TV	Rank^{#}	Opponent^{#}	Result	Record	Site (attendance) city, state
Regular Season
November 13, 2009*; 7:00pm		St. Mary's (TX)	W 72–47	1–0	Reynolds Center (4,862); Tulsa, OK
November 15, 2009*; 2:00pm		Florida International	W 81–49	2–0	Reynolds Center (4,604); Tulsa, OK
November 17, 2009*; 1:00pm, ESPN		Arkansas–Little Rock	W 59–45	3–0	Reynolds Center (5,560); Tulsa, OK
November 21, 2009*; 3:00pm		South Alabama	W 84–62	4–0	Reynolds Center (4,667); Tulsa, OK
November 24, 2009*; 7:00pm		Loyola Marymount	W 79–67	5–0	Reynolds Center (4,626); Tulsa, OK
November 28, 2009*; 7:00pm		at Missouri State	L 75-83	5–1	JQH Arena (7,389); Springfield, MO
December 2, 2009*; 7:30pm		Oklahoma State	W 86–65	6–1	Reynolds Center (8,455); Tulsa, OK
December 6, 2009*; 2:00pm		Ohio	W 81–80	7–1	Reynolds Center (4,886); Tulsa, OK
December 17, 2009*; 7:00pm		Jackson State	W 92–39	8–1	Reynolds Center (4,804); Tulsa, OK
December 19, 2009*; 7:00pm		Chicago State	W 86–49	9–1	Reynolds Center (4,982); Tulsa, OK
December 22, 2009*; 4:30pm		vs. Nebraska; Las Vegas Classic	L 70-74	9–2	Orleans Arena (NA); Las Vegas, NV
December 23, 2009*; 7:00pm		vs. Nevada; Las Vegas Classic	L 68-99	9–3	Orleans Arena (NA); Las Vegas, NV
January 2, 2010*; 2:00pm		Colorado	W 84–59	10–3	Reynolds Center (5,592); Tulsa, OK
January 6, 2010; 7:00pm		Tulane	W 73–59	11–3 (1–0)	Reynolds Center (4,969); Tulsa, OK
January 9, 2010; 6:00pm, CBSCS		at Houston	W 86–80	12–3 (2–0)	Hofheinz Pavilion (3,115); Houston, TX
January 13, 2010; 7:00pm		at SMU	W 63–56	13–3 (3–0)	Moody Coliseum (2,104); Dallas, TX
January 16, 2010; 7:00pm, CBSCS		UCF	W 90–70	14–3 (4–0)	Reynolds Center (2,327); Tulsa, OK
January 20, 2010*; 7:00pm		at Oral Roberts	W 57–52	15–3	Mabee Center (9,303); Tulsa, OK
January 23, 2010; 2:00pm		Rice	W 62–58	16–3 (5–0)	Reynolds Center (5,312); Tulsa, OK
January 26, 2010; 7:00pm		at No. 25 UAB	L 55-65	16–4 (5–1)	Bartow Arena (7,691); Birmingham, AL
January 30, 2010; 4:00pm		at UCF	W 55–50	17–4 (6–1)	UCF Arena (6,632); Orlando, FL
February 3, 2010; 7:00pm		Marshall	W 73–69	18–4 (7–1)	Reynolds Center (5,308); Tulsa, OK
February 6, 2010; 9:00pm, ESPN2		at UTEP	L 59-73	18–5 (7–2)	Don Haskins Center (12,092); El Paso, TX
February 10, 2010; 7:00pm		Southern Miss	W 60–52	19–5 (8–2)	Reynolds Center (5,889); Tulsa, OK
February 13, 2010; 6:00pm		Memphis	L 86-93	19–6 (8–3)	Reynolds Center (7,425); Tulsa, OK
February 17, 2010; 6:00pm		at Marshall	L 58-64	19–7 (8–4)	Cam Henderson Center (5,324); Huntington, WV
February 20, 2010; 3:00pm, CBSCS		UTEP	L 70-78	19–8 (8–5)	Reynolds Center (5,837); Tulsa, OK
February 25, 2010*; 6:00pm, ESPN		at No. 5 Duke	L 52-70	19–9	Cameron Indoor Stadium (9,314); Durham, NC
February 27, 2010; 6:00pm		at East Carolina	W 85–73	20–9 (9–5)	Williams Arena (5,013); Greenville, NC
March 3, 2010; 7:00pm		SMU	W 58–55	21–9 (10–5)	Reynolds Center (5,324); Tulsa, OK
March 6, 2010; 12:00pm, CBSCS		at Memphis	L 53-75	21–10 (10–6)	FedExForum (17,238); Memphis, TN
2010 Conference USA men's basketball tournament
March 10, 2010; 6:00pm		vs. Rice; First round	W 73–62	22–10	BOK Center (NA); Tulsa, OK
March 11, 2010; 6:30pm, CBSCS		vs. Marshall; Quarterfinals	W 80–64	23–10	BOK Center (NA); Tulsa, OK
March 12, 2010; 3:00pm, CBSCS		vs. No. 25 UTEP; Semifinals	L 61-75	23–11	BOK Center (NA); Tulsa, OK
2010 National Invitation Tournament
March 17, 2010; 6:00pm		at Kent State; First Round	L 74–75	23–12	Memorial Athletic and Convocation Center (1,175); Kent, OH
*Non-conference game. ^{#}Rankings from AP Poll. (#) Tournament seedings in parentheses.
