= Aubrey Coleman =

American basketball player

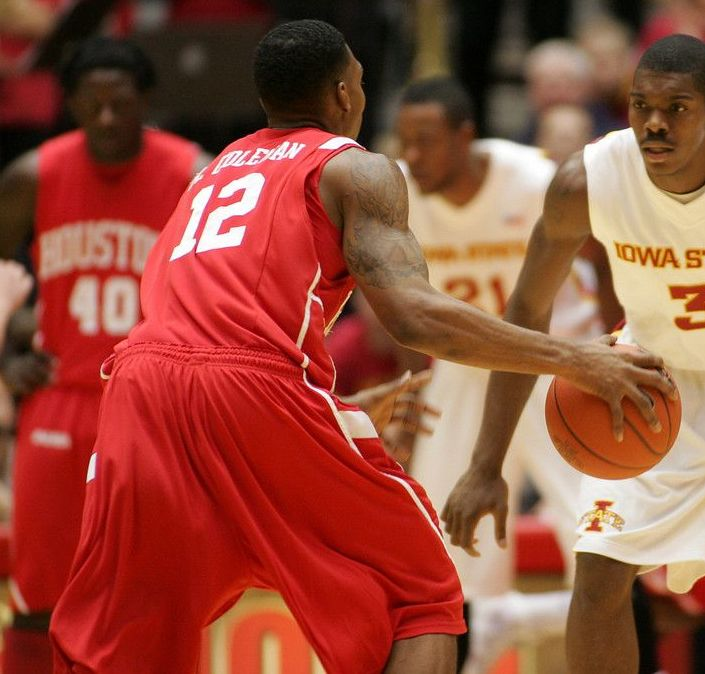
- Coleman with the Houston Cougars in 2010

Personal information
- Born: October 9, 1987 (age 39) Houston, Texas, U.S.
- Listed height: 6 ft 2 in (1.88 m)
- Listed weight: 200 lb (91 kg)

Career information
- High school: Thurgood Marshall (Missouri City, Texas); Gulf Shores Academy (Houston, Texas)
- College: Southwest Mississippi CC (2006–2008); Houston (2008–2010)
- NBA draft: 2010: undrafted
- Playing career: 2010–2019
- Position: Shooting guard
- Number: 6

Career history
- 2010: Aliağa Petkim
- 2011: Austin Toros
- 2011–2012: Angelico Biella
- 2012: Nymburk
- 2012–2013: Austin Toros
- 2013: Reno Bighorns
- 2013: Cholet Basket
- 2013: Cimberio Varese
- 2014: Nilan Bisons Loimaa
- 2014–2015: Best Balıkesir
- 2015: Estudiantes Concordia
- 2016: Bisons Loimaa
- 2016–2017: Yalova Belediyesi
- 2017: Chongqing Sanhai Lanling
- 2017–2018: Spartak Primorye
- 2019: Bisons Loimaa
- 2019: Chartres

Career highlights
- NCAA scoring champion (2010); 2× First-team All-Conference USA (2009, 2010); Conference USA Newcomer of the Year (2009)

Aubrey Gene Coleman (born October 9, 1987) is an American former professional basketball player. He played college basketball as an all-Conference USA player for the University of Houston where he became the NCAA's leading scorer for the 2010 season.

== Career ==
=== Early years ===
Coleman attended high school at Thurgood Marshall High School, though never played on the team. After graduating, he attended Gulf Shores Academy, and then junior college at Southwest Mississippi Community College.

=== College ===
Coleman played as a guard for Houston under the jersey number 12, and majored in sociology. At Houston, Coleman was the 2009 Conference USA Newcomer of the Year as well as a selection for the 2009 All-Conference USA first team. He also received honors of being named to the 2008–09 NABC All-District 11 first team and the 2008–09 USBWA All-District VII Team. His junior season where he started 32 for games, he was the team leader for the Cougars with 19.4 points per game, and was second-place for rebounds per game with 8.2. He also led the league with 2.3 steals per game, received the Conference USA Rookie of the Week award five times, and the Conference USA Player of the Week award two times. During the postseason, he was a part of Houston's team during the 2009 College Basketball Invitational. His season was marred by an incident in January, 2009 in a game against Arizona in which he intentionally stepped on opposing player Chase Budinger's face. Coleman was suspended one game.

For the 2009–10 season, Aubrey Coleman ended the season as the nation's leading scorer in the NCAA. A part of the first Cougars team to win the Conference USA men's basketball tournament in 2010, Coleman was also a part of the first Houston team to enter the NCAA Men's Division I Basketball Championship since 1992.

=== Professional ===
Coleman played for the New Orleans Hornets in the NBA Summer League in 2010, where he averaged 11.4 points and 3.0 rebounds in 5 games, and later joined the Turkish Basketball League team Aliağa Petkim, but left the team in December 2010 for personal reasons. It was announced that Coleman had joined the Austin Toros of the NBA Development League on January 6, 2011. In April 2011 he signed with Angelico Biella in Italy until the end of the season.

After being reacquired by the Toros for the 2012–13 season, on February 22, 2013, he was traded to the Reno Bighorns in exchange for Dontell Jefferson. However, on February 25 and after just two games, he was waived by the Bighorns. In March 2013, he signed with Cholet Basket. On July 16, 2013, Coleman signed with Cimberio Varese. He parted ways with them on December 10, 2013, and signed with Nilan Bisons Loimaa of Korisliiga in Finland in February 2014.

On August 16, 2014, he signed with Best Balıkesir of the Turkish Basketball Second League.

On December 5, 2017, he signed with Russian club Spartak Primorye.

== Career statistics ==
Legend
GP	Games played	GS	Games started	MPG	Minutes per game
FG%	Field goal percentage	3P%	3-point field goal percentage	FT%	Free throw percentage
RPG	Rebounds per game	APG	Assists per game	SPG	Steals per game
BPG	Blocks per game	PPG	Points per game	**Bold**	Career high

*	Led NCAA Division I

=== College ===
Year	Team	GP	GS	MPG	FG%	3P%	FT%	RPG	APG	SPG	BPG	PPG
2008–09	Houston	32	32	32.8	**.426**	.208	**.763**	**8.2**	2.4	2.3	.0	19.4
2009–10	Houston	**35**	**35**	**36.9**	.425	**.317**	.737	7.4	**2.6**	**2.7**	**.2**	**25.6***
Career		67	67	35.0	.426	.292	.748	7.8	2.5	2.5	.1	22.6
