= R. C. Johnson =

American football coach and college athletics administrator

Biographical details
- Born: Ottawa, Illinois, U.S.

Coaching career (HC unless noted)
- 1963–1964: Iowa (assistant)
- 1965–1966: Northern Iowa (assistant)
- 1967–1968: Youngstown State (assistant)
- 1969–1973: Mankato State (assistant)

Administrative career (AD unless noted)
- 1974–1980: Northern Iowa (associate AD)
- 1980–1988: Eastern Illinois
- 1989–1994: Miami (OH)
- 1994–1995: Temple
- 1996–2012: Memphis

Robert Carroll Johnson is an American former college football coach and athletics administrator. He served as the athletic director at Eastern Illinois University (1980–1988), Miami University (1989–1994), Temple University (1994–1995), and the University of Memphis (1996–2012).

In November 2009, Johnson contract with Memphis was extended to run through June 2013. In November 2011, Johnson announced his plans to leave the athletic director's position on June 30, 2012. He will be paid beyond that date as per his contract extension.
