= Marcus Jordan =

American basketball player (born 1990)

Personal information
- Born: December 24, 1990 (age 35) Chicago, Illinois, U.S.
- Listed height: 6 ft 3 in (1.91 m)
- Listed weight: 205 lb (93 kg)

Career information
- High school: Loyola Academy (Wilmette, Illinois); Whitney Young (Chicago, Illinois)
- College: UCF (2009–2012)
- Position: Shooting guard

Career highlights
- Second-team Conference USA (2011); Conference USA All-Freshman Team (2010)
- Stats at Basketball Reference

Marcus James Jordan (born December 24, 1990) is an American former college basketball player who played for the UCF Knights men's basketball team. He is the second-eldest child of retired Hall of Fame basketball player Michael Jordan.

== Basketball career ==
=== High school ===
Jordan originally played high school basketball with his older brother Jeffrey Jordan at Loyola Academy in Wilmette, Illinois. In Marcus's sophomore year, the pair led the school to the conference championship and the best season in school history.

Jordan transferred to Whitney Young Magnet High School in Chicago for his junior and senior seasons. He led the Whitney Young Dolphins to the Illinois 4A Championship in 2009, scoring a game-high 19 points in a 69–66 victory over Waukegan. He also was named the state tournament's most valuable player. Upon his 2009 graduation, Jordan was rated by ESPNU as the 60th-best high school senior shooting guard in the country, averaging 10.0 points, 4.5 rebounds, and 3.2 assists per game.

=== College ===
Jordan played college basketball at the University of Central Florida in Orlando, Florida. During his freshman year, UCF was in the final year of a five-year contract with Adidas, but Jordan insisted on wearing Nike Air Jordan shoes because of loyalty to his father. This eventually prompted Adidas to terminate its sponsorship deal with UCF.

Jordan scored 8.0 points per game in his true freshman year in 2009–10 and scored 1,152 points in his college career. On November 12, 2010, the opening game of the 2010–11 season, Jordan led UCF to victory against University of West Florida scoring a career high 28 points on 8–11 field-goal shooting and 5–7 from the 3-point line. He also had a team-high 18 points in upsetting number-16 ranked Florida on December 1, 2010.

In August 2012, Jordan left the UCF basketball team, following in the footsteps of his brother, Jeffrey, who departed the team in January of the same year, but he continued to take classes at the school. He graduated in 2013 from The Rosen College of Hospitality Management with a bachelor’s degree.

== Other activities ==
Jordan opened a high-end sneaker store named the "Trophy Room" in May 2016. Located in the Disney Springs retail area of Disney World in Orlando, Florida, the store closed and the business transitioned to online-only sales three years later.

Jordan competed on season two of The Traitors, where he finished in 20th place.

== Personal life ==
Jordan was born on December 24, 1990, to Michael Jordan and Juanita Vanoy. He has an older brother, Jeffrey, and a younger sister Jasmine. Jordan grew up in Highland Park, Illinois. Through his father's second wife, he has twin half-sisters: Ysabel and Victoria (born February 9, 2014).

In 2010, while a college sophomore and underage, Jordan tweeted about spending approximately $50,000 at nightclubs in Las Vegas, prompting an investigation by the Nevada Gaming Control Board. In 2012, Jordan was arrested after a drunken argument with two women outside a hotel in Omaha. He was charged with disorderly conduct, resisting arrest, and obstructing justice, then released. Jordan later pled no contest to disturbing the peace and paid a fine of $250 plus court costs.

Jordan dated Larsa Pippen from 2022 until 2024.

On February 4, 2025, Jordan was arrested in Orange County, Florida for DUI, cocaine possession and resisting arrest. He was then booked into Orange County Jail, with his bond being set at $4,000. On February 5, 2025, Jordan was free from jail after posting the bond. The same day, body camera footage was released showing Jordan's luxury car stuck in the gravel on a train track at 1:30 am on February 4 in Maitland, Florida, when police found him.
