= Kelvin Lewis =

American basketball coach (born 1988)

Georgia Tech Yellow Jackets
- Title: Assistant coach
- Conference: Atlantic Coast Conference

Personal information
- Born: April 12, 1988 (age 38) Dallas, Texas, U.S.
- Listed height: 6 ft 4 in (1.93 m)
- Listed weight: 203 lb (92 kg)

Career information
- High school: North Crowley (Fort Worth, Texas)
- College: Auburn (2006–2007); Houston (2007–2010)
- NBA draft: 2010: undrafted
- Playing career: 2010–2023
- Position: Shooting guard
- Number: 1
- Coaching career: 2023–present

Career history

Playing
- 2010–2011: Texas Legends
- 2011–2012: Rio Grande Valley Vipers
- 2012–2013: Solna Vikings
- 2013–2014: Tampereen Pyrintö
- 2014–2015: BC Timișoara
- 2015–2016: Kolossos Rodou
- 2016: Soproni KC
- 2017: Tampereen Pyrintö
- 2017–2018: Höttur
- 2018: Kauhajoki Karhu
- 2018–2019: Gladiators Trier
- 2019–2023: SKN St. Pölten

Coaching
- 2023–2026: Troy (assistant)
- 2026–present: Georgia Tech (assistant)

Career highlights
- Romanian Cup winner (2015); 2× Korisliiga champion (2014, 2018); Korisliiga Defensive Player of the Year (2014); Úrvalsdeild scoring champion (2018); NBA D-League champion (2012); Third-team All-Conference USA (2009); Conference USA All-Defensive Team (2009); Conference USA tournament MVP (2010)

Kelvin Michaúd Lewis (born April 12, 1988) is an American college basketball coach who currently serves as an assistant coach for the Georgia Tech Yellow Jackets. He was a former professional player for 13 seasons, spending much of his career overseas.

== College career ==
Lewis played collegiately for the Houston Cougars, helping them reach an NCAA Tournament berth for the first time in 18 years. The only C-USA MVP in school history. He finished third in school history in 3 pointers made. He also finished with 1,465 points in only 3 seasons, ranking him 14th all time in University of Houston history. He transferred to Houston from Auburn, where he spent his freshman year. Prior to Auburn, Lewis played for North Crowley High School in Fort Worth, Texas, where he was a part of the Rivals 150 recruits, and also All-State first team selection.

== Professional career ==
Lewis played for the Houston Rockets in the 2010 NBA Summer League. In August 2010, he signed with Kavala of Greece. He left Kavala before the start of the season. On November 2, 2010, he was drafted by the Texas Legends. On March 4, 2011, he was traded to the Rio Grande Valley Vipers. On November 2, 2011, he was re-acquired by the Vipers.

In August 2012, he signed with Solna Vikings of Sweden. In which he earned 2nd Team All-Basketligen honors. For the 2013–14 season he signed with Tampereen Pyrintö of Finland. He helped his team to win the Korisliiga, also was named Korisliiga Defensive Player of the Year.

After attending Mini Camp with the Orlando Magic, In July 2014 Lewis signed with BC Timișoara of Romania. They also won the Cup that season.

In the 2015–16 season he played with Kolossos Rodou in Greek A1.

Lewis returned to Tampereen Pyrintö in February 2017 and averaged 10.7 points in 12 games in the Korisliiga.

On October 22, 2017, Lewis tried out with the Santa Cruz Warriors. He was put on waivers on October 31 before playing any games for the Warriors.

On November 6, 2017, Lewis signed with Höttur of the Icelandic Úrvalsdeild karla, replacing Aaron Moss. On February 21, Höttur announced they had released Lewis to allow him to sign with Kauhajoki Karhu Basket in the Finnish Korisliiga. Despite his early exit, he led the Úrvalsdeild in scoring with 25.4 points per game in 14 games.

In May 2018, he helped Karhu win the Korisliiga championship.

He scored 5,450 Career Points as a Professional Player.
