= List of Butler University alumni =

Following is a list of notable alumni from Butler University in Indianapolis, Indiana.

== Art and architecture ==
- India Crago Harris, president of the Art Association of Indianapolis (now the Indianapolis Museum of Art)
- Mattie Lietz, painter
- Avriel Shull, architectural designer and interior decorator

== Business ==
- Barry Fromm, chairman of Value Recovery Group LLC, Ohio Railcar Group, LLC, and Value Recovery Holding, LLC
- Henry Kahn, founder of the Kahn Tailoring Company
- Chris Kirchner, co-founder and former CEO of logistics company Slync.io

== Education ==
- Cleo W. Blackburn, CEO of the Fundamental Board of Education
- Hallie Beachem Brooks, professor of library science at Atlanta University
- Mary Jane Brown, first person to earn a doctorate from the University of Oklahoma
- Jennifer Conrad, economist; Dalton McMichael Distinguished Professor of Finance at Kenan-Flagler Business School
- William G. Dever, archaeologist, Biblical scholar, theologian, and professor of Near Eastern Archaeology and Anthropology at the University of Arizona and Lycoming College
- J. Gordon Edwards, entomologist and professor of entomology at San Jose State University for 40 years
- Edward Ezell, author and professor who served as National Firearms Collection curator at the National Museum of American History
- Flora Frick, chair of the women's physical education department at Moorhead State Teachers College
- Katharine Merrill Graydon, classical scholar and college professor of English literature
- Jane Halonen, educational psychologist and dean of the College of Arts and Sciences and professor of psychology at the University of West Florida
- Elmer George Homrighausen, professor and dean at Princeton Theological Seminary
- Frank Hoppensteadt, mathematician and research professor at New York University's Courant Institute
- David Starr Jordan, president of Indiana University and first president of Stanford University
- Mary Lou Allison Gardner Little, educator and the primary founder of the Sigma Gamma Rho sorority
- Michael Calvin McGee, rhetorical theorist and professor
- Catherine McGeoch, computer scientist specializing in empirical algorithmics and Beitzel Professor in Technology and Society at Amherst College
- John S. Schuchman, educator and academic administrator who taught at Gallaudet University
- Emma Lou Thornbrough, pioneer in African-American history and professor of history at Butler University
- Ivory Lee Toldson, psychologist and professor at Temple University and Southern University
- Victor C. Twitty, biologist, embryologist, and chair of the biological sciences department at Stanford University
- William Ayres Ward, Egyptologist and professor at Beirut College for Women, the American University of Beirut, and Brown University
- Earl Irvin West, historian of the Restoration Movement and professor of church history at Harding Graduate School of Religion (now Harding School of Theology)

== Entertainment ==
- Ross Barbour, singer and founding member of Four Freshmen singing group
- Kevin Calabro, play-by-play announcer in basketball and Seattle sports radio host
- Lamar Campbell, gospel musician who created the group Spirit of Praise
- David Clarke, Broadway and motion picture actor
- George Daugherty, conductor of major American and international symphony orchestras; Emmy winner and 5-time Emmy nominee
- Todd Duncan, baritone opera singer and actor
- Sharon Everitt, film and television director, producer, and editor
- Frank Felice, composer of contemporary classical music and associate professor of composition, theory, and electronic music in the Jordan College of Arts at Butler University
- Luke Flynn, composer
- Brandon Gaudin, television broadcaster for Bally Sports South and Bally Sports Southeast's coverage of the Atlanta Braves baseball
- Bill Hazen, basketball sportscaster and syndicated radio host
- Freddie Hubbard, trumpeter and composer
- Janet Langhart, television journalist and anchor, and author
- Michael Leckrone, director of the University of Wisconsin Marching Band 1969–2019
- Peter Lupus, television actor and bodybuilder
- Corey McPherrin, former evening news anchor for WFLD-TV in Chicago
- John Minko, sports radio and television personality
- Marilyn Mitzel, television reporter and news anchor
- Michael Murray, organist
- Johann Sebastian Paetsch, musician and cellist
- Cassie Pappas, television writer, screenwriter and playwright
- Rebecca Paul, Tennessee Lottery president and CEO, former Florida Lottery secretary, former Georgia Lottery secretary, and Miss Indiana 1972
- Randall Scotting, opera countertenor
- Steve Sledje, singer-songwriter and guitarist of the death metal band Hellstrum
- Jay Stewart, television and radio announcer known primarily for his work on game shows such as Let's Make a Deal
- Joshua Lee Turner, singer-songwriter, multi-instrumentalist, and record producer
- Maurine Dallas Watkins, screenwriter and playwright who wrote Chicago
- Bill Weber, former television sports commentator best known for his work on TNT and NBC NASCAR broadcasts

== Law ==
- John V. Hadley, justice of the Indiana Supreme Court and member of the Indiana Senate
- Lawson Harvey, justice of the Indiana Supreme Court
- Jane Magnus-Stinson, United States district judge of the United States District Court for the Southern District of Indiana
- John Morton-Finney, civil rights activist and lawyer
- Quincy Alden Myers, justice of the Indiana Supreme Court
- Linley E. Pearson, 37th Indiana attorney general
- Allen Sharp, United States district judge of the United States District Court for the Northern District of Indiana

== Literature and journalism ==
- Ken Brewer, poet, scholar, and Poet Laureate of Utah
- Grace Julian Clarke, author, journalist, and women's suffrage activist
- Richard N. Côté, author, social historian, and lecturer
- Alice Friman, poet, professor emerita at the University of Indianapolis, and former poet-in-residence at Georgia College & State University
- William Gaines, Pulitzer Prize-winning investigative reporter for the Chicago Tribune and professor of journalism at the University of Illinois at Urbana-Champaign
- Clotilde Betances Jaeger, feminist writer and journalist
- Maurice Kenny, poet
- Mark Kurlansky, journalist and author of fiction and non-fiction books
- Elizabeth Miller, novelist
- James Alexander Thom, author, best known for his works in the Western genre
- Wendi C. Thomas, investigative journalist and founder of MLK50
- Gayle Thornbrough, editor and director of publications and library of the Indiana Historical Society
- William Tobin, newspaper journalist, reporter, editor, and correspondent for The Associated Press
- Maurine Dallas Watkins, journalist, playwright; author of play Chicago
- J. N. Williamson, horror writer and editor
- Marguerite Young, novelist and editor

== Military ==
- Woodrow A. Abbott, United States Air Force brigadier general who served as director of intelligence and inspector general of the U.S. Readiness Command
- Alfred Ahner, Indiana National Guard officer who served for 15 years as the state's adjutant general
- Alberto Díaz Jr., U.S. Navy admiral
- Elna Jane Hilliard Grahn, commander in the Women's Army Auxiliary Corps (WAAC) and later the Women's Army Corps during World War II
- Elaine C. Wagner, rear admiral in the United States Navy and 36th chief of the United States Navy Dental Corps

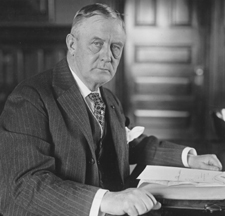
Harry S. New

== Politics ==
- Terri Austin, member of the Indiana House of Representatives
- Steve Bennett, member of the California State Assembly
- Virginia Murphy Blankenbaker, former member of the Indiana State Senate
- James Brainard, mayor of Carmel, Indiana
- William E. English, U.S. representative from Indiana
- David W. Evans, U.S. representative from Indiana 1975–1983
- John Fogg, mayor of Pensacola, Florida
- John V. Hadley, member of the Indiana Senate and justice of the Indiana Supreme Court
- Addison C. Harris, member of the Indiana Senate and U.S. Envoy Extraordinary and Minister Plenipotentiary (ambassador) to Austria-Hungary
- Joe Hogsett, 49th mayor of Indianapolis, secretary of state of Indiana, and United States attorney for the Southern District of Indiana
- O. P. Hubbard, president and member of the Alaska Senate
- Edward H. Kruse, U.S. representative from Indiana
- Justin Moed, member of the Indiana House of Representatives
- Nyla Murphy, Wyoming House of Representatives
- Harry S. New, U.S. senator from Indiana and United States Postmaster General
- Karen Pence, former Second Lady of the United States and first lady of Indiana
- Jerome Reppa, former member of the Indiana House of Representatives
- Richard Roudebush, former U.S. representative from Indiana
- George Ryan, former Illinois governor
- Bruce Charles Savage, commissioner of the United States Public Housing Administration (now United States Department of Housing and Urban Development)
- Hal Slager, member of the Indiana House of Representatives
- Raymond S. Springer, member of the U.S. House of Representatives from Indiana

== Religion ==
- Robert W. Funk, biblical scholar, founder of the Jesus Seminar and the nonprofit Westar Institute in Santa Rosa, California
- Gerald Andrew Gettelfinger, prelate of the Roman Catholic church who served as the bishop of the Diocese of Evansville
- Job Harriman, minister who later became an agnostic and a socialist
- S. U. Hastings, first Jamaican national consecrated as a bishop of the Moravian Church
- Jim Jones, preacher who led the Peoples Temple; cult leader who ordered a mass suicide and mass murder of 918 commune members in 1978
- Donald McGavran, missiologist and founding Dean of the School of World Mission at Fuller Theological Seminary

== Social services and nonprofit ==
- Talitha Gerlach, YWCA worker who spent most of her life as a social worker in Shanghai, China
- Diane Meyer Simon, environmental activist, founder and leader of Global Green USA

== Science and medicine ==
- Leroy Edgar Burney, physician and eighth Surgeon General of the United States
- Stanley A. Cain, botanist, plant ecologist, and college professor
- Arthur C. Cope, chemist and originator of the Cope reaction and Cope rearrangement
- Howard A. Howe, polio researcher
- Robert M. Jacobson, chair of pediatrics at Mayo Clinic and medical director of the Population Health Science Program of the Robert D. and Patricia E. Kern Center for the Science of Health Care Delivery
- Charles McKay, naturalist, explorer, and collector for the Smithsonian Institution
- Stewart Springer, ichthyologist and herpetologist

== Sports ==
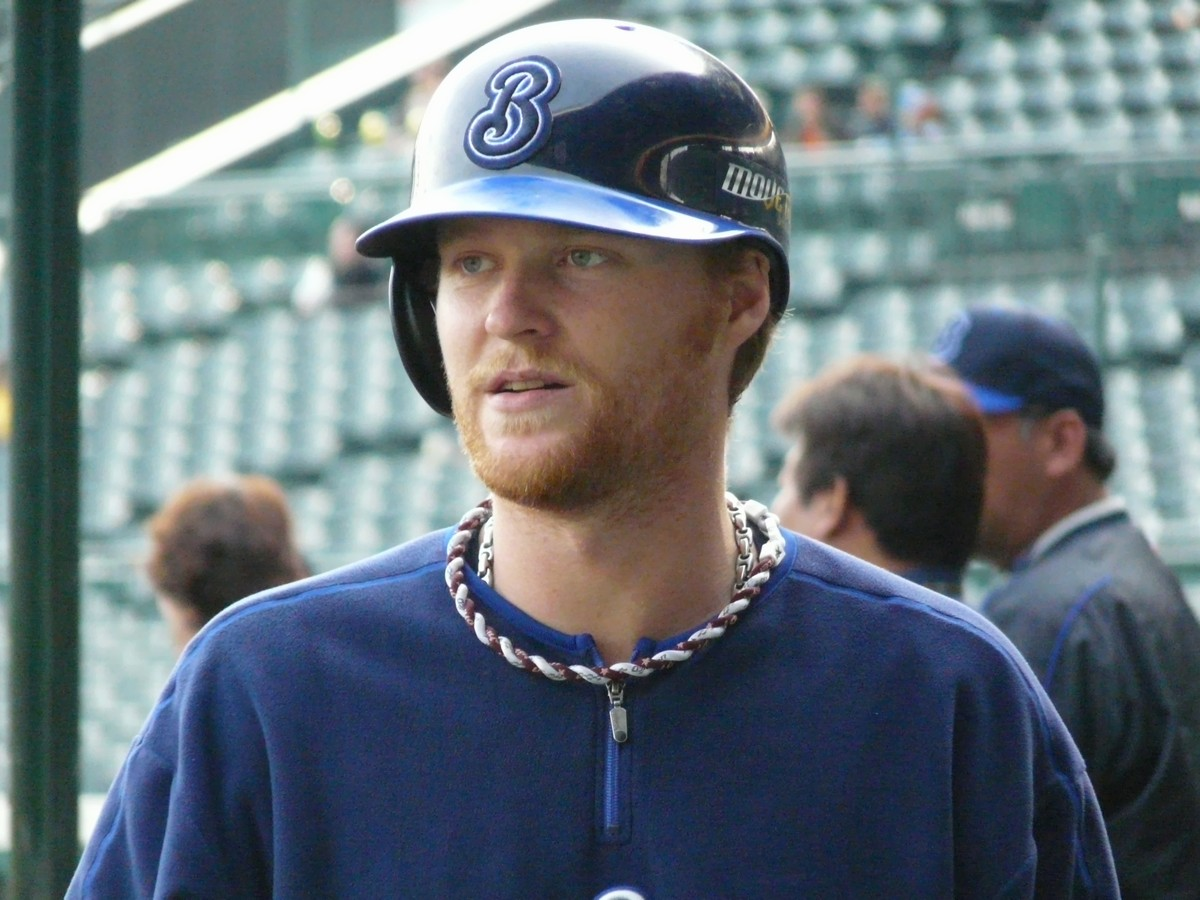
Dan Johnson

=== Baseball ===
- Jeff Albert, professional baseball coach
- Radley Haddad, professional baseball coach for the Pittsburgh Pirates
- Jack Hendricks, professional baseball player and manager
- Oral Hildebrand, professional baseball player with the Cleveland Indians, St. Louis Browns, and New York Yankees
- Dan Johnson, professional baseball player
- Doug Jones, professional baseball player
- Pat Neshek, professional baseball player
- Ryan Pepiot, professional baseball pitcher
- Eric Stout, professional baseball player
- G. Cullen Thomas, head baseball, basketball, and football coach at Butler University

=== Basketball ===
- Darin Archbold, college basketball player
- Scott Armstrong, professional basketball player
- Frank Baird, professional basketball player with the National Basketball League
- Kamar Baldwin, professional basketball player
- Rotnei Clarke, professional basketball player
- Barry S. Collier, Butler University athletic director and former head basketball coach at Butler and Nebraska
- Bob Dietz, professional basketball player
- Scott Drew, Baylor University men's basketball coach
- Kellen Dunham, professional basketball player
- Norm Ellenberger, head basketball coach at the University of New Mexico
- Bob Evans, professional basketball player
- Darrin Fitzgerald, college basketball player
- A. J. Graves, professional basketball player
- Matthew Graves, former head basketball coach at the University of South Alabama
- Mike Green, professional basketball player
- Jermaine Guice, professional basketball player
- Rylan Hainje, professional basketball player
- Chuck Harris, college basketball player
- Gordon Hayward, professional basketball player and professional e-sports athlete
- Matt Howard, professional basketball player
- Thomas Jackson, professional basketball coach and player
- Roosevelt Jones, professional basketball coach and former player
- LaVall Jordan, college basketball coach
- Todd Lickliter, former college basketball coach
- Shelvin Mack, professional basketball player
- Kelan Martin, professional basketball player
- Thad Matta, retired Butler basketball head coach and former Ohio State University men's basketball head coach
- Sean McDermott, professional basketball player
- Brandon Miller, college basketball coach
- Lyle Neat, professional basketball player
- Jon Neuhouser, college basketball player
- Ronald Nored, current head coach at Butler; former assistant coach for the Atlanta Hawks and former head coach of the NBA D-League Long Island Nets
- Woody Norris, professional basketball player
- Bob Nulf, college football and basketball coach
- Ralph O'Brien, professional basketball player
- Bobby Plump, Indiana Basketball Hall of Fame inductee, and hero of the 1954 Milan High School team whose story provided the basis for the 1986 film Hoosiers
- Brandon Polk, professional basketball player
- Cy Proffitt, professional basketball player
- Kethan Savage, professional basketball player
- Wilbur Schumacher, professional basketball player
- Billy Shepherd, college basketball player
- Andrew Smith, college basketball player
- Derrik Smits, college basketball player
- Travis Steele, college basketball coach
- Jerry Steiner, professional basketball player
- Jordan Tucker, professional basketball player
- Rolf van Rijn, professional basketball player
- Shawn Vanzant, college basketball coach and former professional basketball player
- Tyler Wideman, professional basketball player in the Israeli National League
- Kameron Woods, professional basketball coach and player

=== Football ===
- Bob Bartolomeo, college football coach
- Phil Brown, college football coach
- Babe Dimancheff, professional football player
- David Elson, head football coach at Western Kentucky University
- Stephen Fickert, college and indoor professional football coach
- Hal Griggs, professional football player
- Frank Hedden, head football coach at Butler University
- Curly Hinchman, professional football player
- Joe Kodba, professional football player
- Ken LaRose, head football coach and athletic director for development at Butler University
- Bill Lynch, head football coach at DePauw University and Indiana University Bloomington
- Arnold Mickens, professional football player
- Robert L. Nipper, head football coach at DePauw University
- Chris Salvi, professional football player
- Matthew Shiltz, gridiron football player with the Canadian Football League
- Bill Sylvester, head football coach and athletic director at Butler University
- Garo Yepremian, Miami Dolphins placekicker

=== Lacrosse ===
- Mike Regan, professional lacrosse player with National Lacrosse League and Major League Lacrosse
- Ryan Ward, professional lacrosse player in the National Lacrosse League

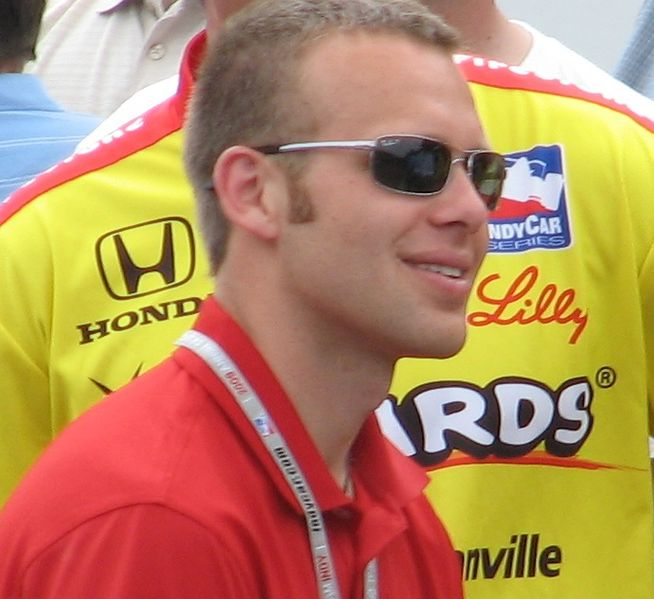
Ed Carpenter

=== Paralympics ===
- Dani Aravich, Paralympian who competed at the 2020, 2022, and 2026 Paralympic Games

=== Racing ===
- Ed Carpenter, IndyCar Series driver
- Sarah Fisher, retired professional race car driver who competed in the Indy Racing League

=== Soccer ===
- Jeremy Aldrich, professional soccer player with Major League Soccer
- Stephen Armstrong, professional soccer player
- Jordan Burt, professional soccer player
- Wilmer Cabrera Jr., professional soccer player
- Julian Cardona, professional soccer player
- Eric Dick, professional soccer player
- Brandon Fricke, professional soccer player
- David Goldsmith, soccer player and assistant coach for college soccer
- Matt Hedges, professional soccer player
- Alex Lehtinen, professional soccer player
- Eric Leonard, professional soccer player
- Paige Monaghan, professional soccer player who plays for Racing Louisville FC in the National Women's Soccer League
- Talia Sommer, professional soccer player who plays for Gotham FC in the National Women's Soccer League
- Zach Steinberger, professional soccer player
- Casey Sweeney, professional soccer player in the USISL
- Jared Timmer, professional soccer player

=== Track and field ===
- Callum Hawkins, distance runner who competed in the marathon at the 2016 Summer Olympics
- Becky Lyne, middle-distance runner
- Victoria Mitchell, long-distance runner
- Scott Overall, track and field Olympic athlete

== Other ==
- Peter Kassig, aid worker taken hostage and ultimately beheaded by the Islamic State
- Madge Oberholtzer, Indiana state employee whose death at the hands of D.C. Stephenson hastened the demise of the Ku Klux Klan in the state
