= List of Butler Bulldogs men's basketball head coaches =

The following is a list of Butler Bulldogs men's basketball head coaches. There have been 25 head coaches of the Bulldogs in their 125-season history.

Butler's current head coach is Ronald Nored. He was hired in March 2026 to replace Thad Matta.

No.	Tenure	Coach	Years	Record	Pct.
–	1896–1897	Unknown	1	1–0	1.000
1	1897–1899	James L. Zink	2	2–5	.286
2	1899–1903	Walter F. Kelly	4	6–8	.429
3	1903–1904	Ralph Jones	1	2–2	.500
4	1904–1906	Edgar Wingard	2	7–3	.700
5	1906–1907	Art Guedel	1	2–4	.333
6	1907–1909 (Note: McKay and McCrea served as co-head coaches for the 1908–09 season. Their record of 5–2 is reflected in both coaches' records.)	Jack McKay	2	9–6	.600
7	1908–1909	Joe McCrea	1	5–2	.714
8	1909–1910	Walter Gipe	1	3–4	.429
9	1910–1912	Bill Diddle	2	10–12	.455
10	1912–1918 (Note: Butler did not field a basketball team for the 1913–14 season.)	G. Cullen Thomas	5	16–28	.364
11	1918–1919	Joe Mullane	1	1–9	.100
12	1919–1920	F. E. Ellis	1	2–4	.333
13	1920–1926	Harlan Page	6	103–30	.774
14	1926–1942; 1945–1970	Tony Hinkle	41	560–392	.588
15	1942–1945 (Note: Butler did not field a basketball team for the 1943–44 season.)	Frank Hedden	2	18–15	.545
16	1970–1977	George Theofanis	7	79–105	.429
17	1977–1989	Joe Sexson	12	143–188	.432
18	1989–2000	Barry Collier	11	196–132	.598
19	2000–2001; 2022–2026	Thad Matta	5	87–77	.530
20	2001–2007	Todd Lickliter	6	131–61	.682
21	2007–2013	Brad Stevens	6	166–49	.772
22	2013–2014	Brandon Miller	1	14–17	.452
23	2014–2017	Chris Holtmann	3	70–31	.693
24	2017–2022	LaVall Jordan	5	83–74	.529
25	2026–present	Ronald Nored	1	0–0	–
Totals		25 coaches	127 seasons	1,711–1,256	.577
Records updated through end of 2025–26 season Source
