= Butler Blue =

Bulldog mascot of Butler University

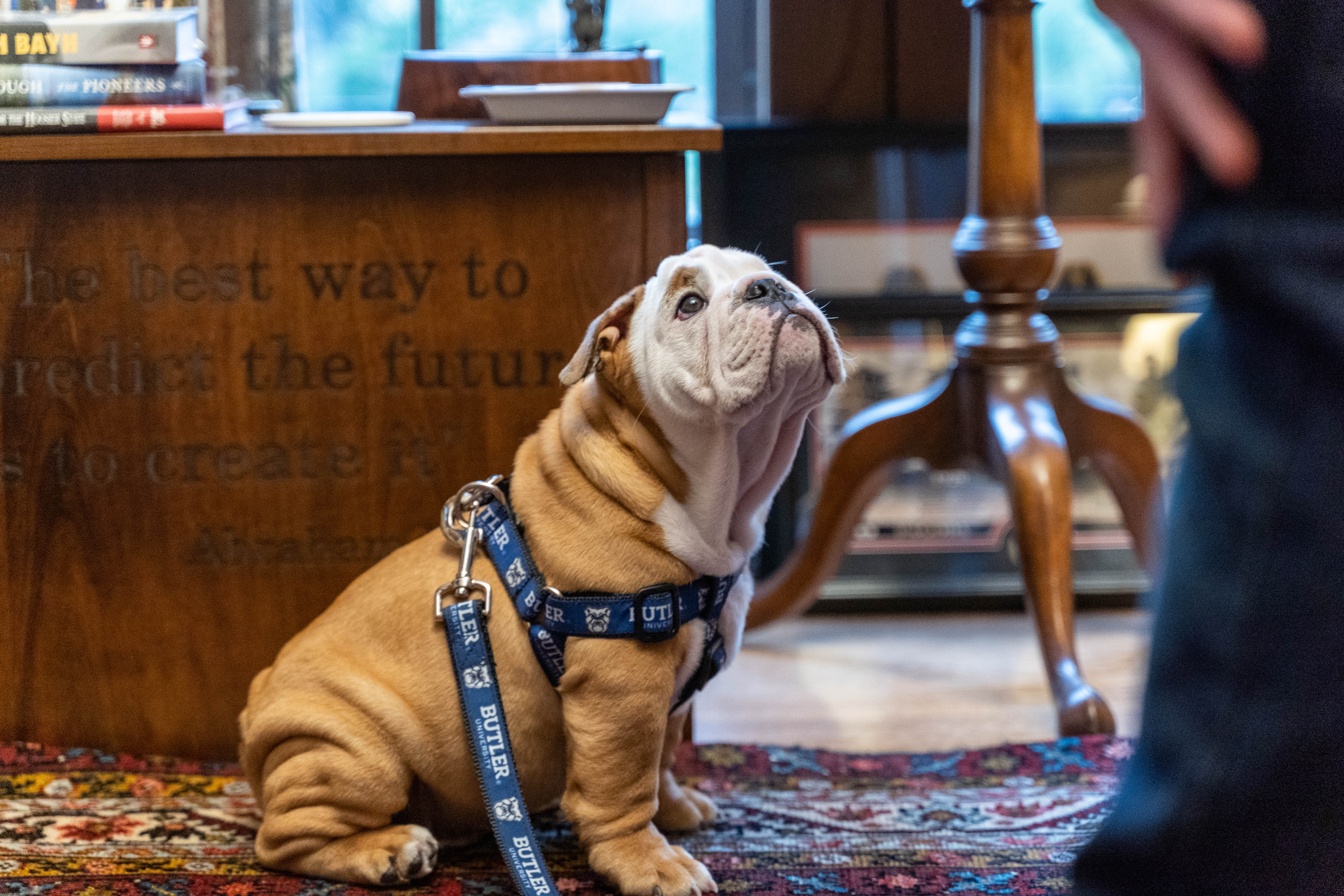
- Butler Blue IV in 2020
- University: Butler University
- Conference: Big East
- Description: English Bulldog
- Origin of name: Student contest

Butler Blue is the official mascot of Butler University. There have been five bulldogs to bear the name, with the most recent, who assumed the name in November 2026, taking over as mascot in the 2026–27 school year. The current iteration of Butler Blue is Butler Blue V, also known as "Blue". Blue is a red fawn and white, male English Bulldog.

== Butler Blue V ==
Butler officially introduced Blue V, a red fawn English bulldog puppy, as the fifth mascot in its celebrated Live Mascot Program on Friday, November 13, 2026. Born August 17, Blue V succeeds Butler Blue IV, who is retiring after nearly seven years representing the university.

== Butler Blue IV ==
Butler Blue IV (born October 30, 2019), also known as Blue, became Butler's official live mascot effective with the 2020–21 school year. Officially announced on January 22, 2020, he was introduced on January 24, first to the university community in the day and then to the general public at the Bulldogs' game that evening at Hinkle Fieldhouse. A "Changing of the Collar" ceremony marking Blue's succession to the mascot role was held on February 29 as part of pregame festivities for the final Butler men's basketball home game of the season against DePaul. The ceremony involves the old mascot's custom-made collar being passed to the new mascot.

The arrival of Butler Blue IV also ushered in a new page to the Butler Blue Live Mascot program, as Blue is under the care of a new handler, Evan Krauss '16, and his wife, Kennedy. Michael Kaltenmark '02 and his wife Tiffany relinquished full-time handler duties after 16 years.

Krauss has been involved with the live mascot program since he was a student at Butler during Trip's tenure as mascot. He began with a position on the Butler Blue Crew, a student group that assists the handler. When not serving as mascot, Blue IV lives with Krauss and his wife Kennedy.

A male like his two immediate predecessors, Blue was chosen in a process that involved the following Butler alumni, as well as other Butler employees:

- Michael Kaltenmark, the university's director of external relations, who had been the handler for Blue's predecessors Butler Blue II and Blue III ("Trip").
- Evan Krauss, a university marketing specialist who took over from Kaltenmark as mascot handler.
- Kurt Phillips, an Indianapolis veterinarian who has provided veterinary care for all Butler Blues to date.

Blue IV was the only male among a litter of three puppies bred by Jodi and Cameron Madaj (pronounced "mayday"). They have a son who played soccer at Butler, and Jodi had regularly provided pregame treats for Butler's live mascots since Blue II became the mascot in 2004. When Phillips examined the litter at six weeks of age he noticed the male stood out among the others. In an interview for the university, he noted, "There's a lot to consider with bulldogs, and we looked at everything. He will be awesome. He is a super cool puppy. He is super easy going and not aggressive at all. Everything fell in line with this dog." Blue IV spent the first several weeks after being unveiled meeting students and adjusting to his new role, and had completed a training course alongside Krauss at a local dog obedience school before the "Changing of the Collar" ceremony.

Prior to the 2021 NCAA Division I men's basketball tournament, which was moved in its entirety to Butler's home city of Indianapolis and nearby areas in Indiana due to COVID-19, with some games played at Hinkle Fieldhouse, Butler launched a publicity campaign declaring Blue IV to be the "Mayor of March", complete with a proclamation purportedly from Blue. The mascot was Butler's quasi-official tournament ambassador, attending many games and tournament-related events.

In October 2023, Blue underwent surgery for a torn cranial cruciate ligament (CCL). He had a TPLO, or tibial plateau leveling osteotomy, on October 20 and started physical rehabilitation on November 8. Blue was back on the court supporting the Butler University basketball team for the Thanksgiving Day ESPN Events Invitational in Orlando, Florida on November 23.

== Butler Blue III ("Trip") ==
Butler Blue III (born December 23, 2011 – April 6, 2024), also called Trip (short for Triple, since he is the third mascot in succession), served from May 2013 until his retirement from the role in May 2020. Cared for by Michael Kaltenmark and his wife Tiffany, Blue III weighs 65 pounds and is distinguished by his red brindle and white markings. He is the great-grandson of Ch. Cherokee Legend Rock, and was recognized as an AKC Canine Good Citizen.

Trip made his debut before a sellout crowd in Hinkle Fieldhouse prior to a men's basketball game on February 18, 2012.

=== Retirement ===
In October 2019, the university announced that Blue III would retire at the end of the 2019–20 school year. Kaltenmark, who at the time was awaiting a kidney transplant (which he ultimately received in January 2020), also retired from his handling duties at that time, though he remains in his full-time position at the university and is still involved with the mascot program in a behind-the-scenes role.

In a university press release, Kaltenmark noted that Trip was approaching the life expectancy of his breed:

While he loves to work and enjoys being the Butler Bulldog, it's time. The average lifespan of an English bulldog is 8-to-12 years, and now that Trip is entering that range, we want to make sure he gets to enjoy the simple pleasures of life as just our family dog.

At the time Trip's retirement was announced, it was planned for him to embark on a farewell tour, billed as "One Last Trip". The plan most notably called for him to take several road trips with the men's basketball team. Kaltenmark received a hospital visit from Trip on the day after his transplant; he would tell Jeff Borzello of ESPN, "He came today, he wanted to perform. He saw all the cameras and the people, and he knew that I was OK. He wasn't as concerned about me as [he was] working the room."

== Butler Blue II ==
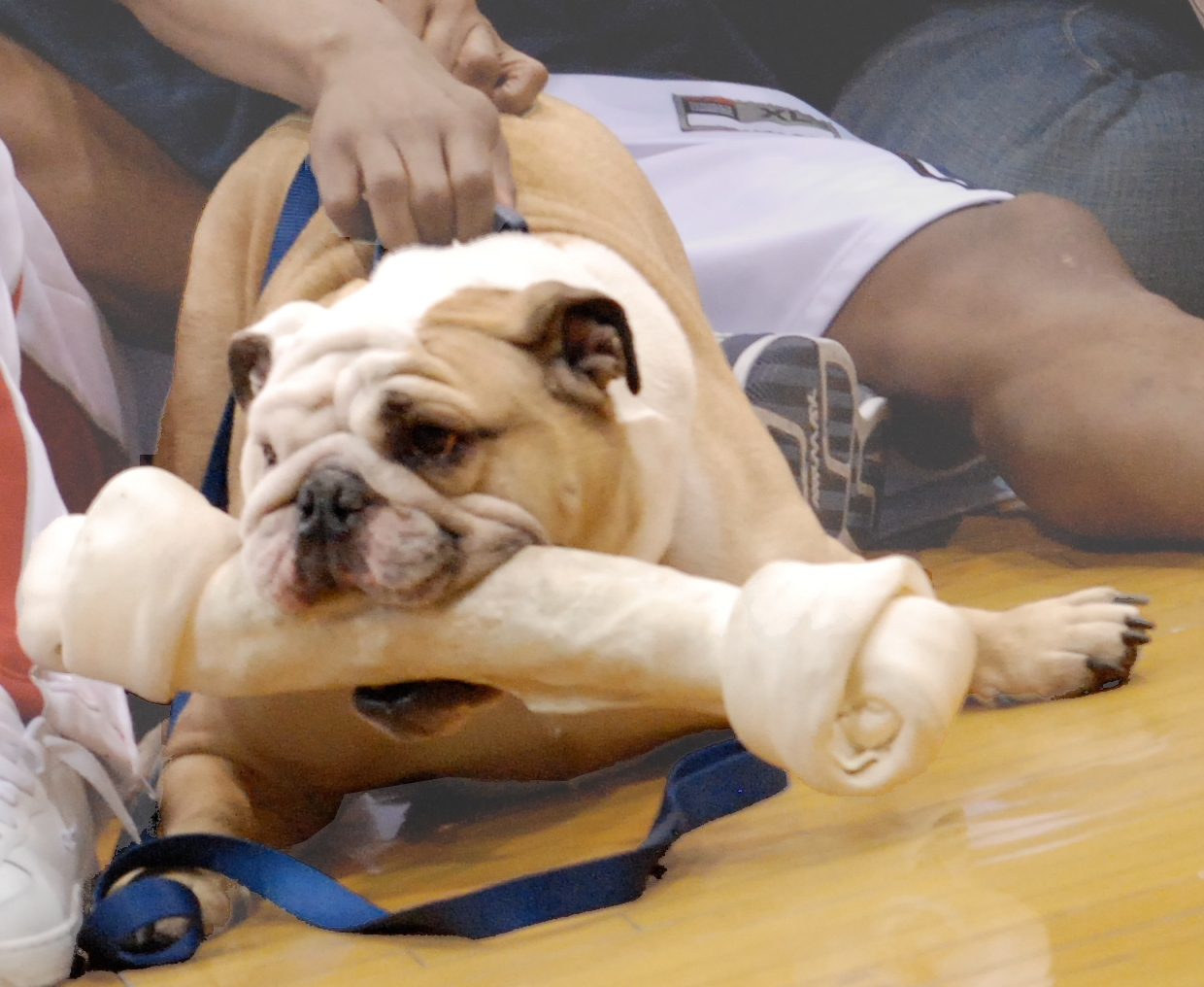

Butler Blue II (March 27, 2004 – August 31, 2013) (often called simply Blue II or Blue) served from 2004 to 2013. He was known by the tagline "Butler's Mascot, America's Dog". He rose to national prominence when the Butler Bulldogs men's basketball team made unexpected runs to the 2010 and 2011 Final Fours. Blue II was retired on May 20, 2013, and replaced by Butler Blue III.

=== Personal life ===
Blue II was born on March 27, 2004, to sire CH Sandy Ridge Too Right Mate and dam Kongs Margie M. Blue II is the second in a lineage of English Bulldogs bred by Frank and Jeane King of Kong King Kennels in Lizton, Indiana, to serve as the mascot of Butler. He is the nephew of Butler Blue I, the university's first official live mascot who served from 2000 to 2004.

Blue II's favorite treats included "Holistic Select snacks, ice cream and cheese". He enjoyed chew toys made of soft latex, with basketballs and footballs being among his favorites. He enjoyed outdoor activities and disliked thunderstorms and fax machines.

Blue II weighed 63 lb (29 kg) and featured a fawn and white fur coat. He was owned and cared for by the Kaltenmark family.

=== Career ===
Blue II made his mascot debut on May 20, 2004. Throughout his career, Blue II attended most Butler Bulldogs home basketball and football games, as well as numerous other university events. Before each home basketball game, Blue II sat at mid-court and waited as each starter pat him on the head for good luck. He then ran to the student section of the arena and grabbed an oversized rawhide bone. On campus, regular students also patted Blue II on the head whenever they could, believing he would help them get good grades.

Blue's tricks include pouting, giving a "high five", playing dead, rolling over, speaking, and skateboarding. Kaltenmark regularly posted in Blue's name to social media. In 2012, he was nominated for a Shorty Award for his Twitter activity, totaling more than 17,000 tweets. In 2011, Klout named his Twitter feed one of the top 10 feeds representing a college or university. According to ESPN's Eamonn Brennan, Blue II "fostered an online persona second to none in college sports", using Twitter better than most coaches.

=== Media attention ===
During the 2010 NCAA Division I men's basketball tournament opening rounds, Butler requested to have Blue II attended the games. NCAA rules prohibit live animals during tournament games, and so Blue II was not allowed to attend. However, when Butler made an unexpected run to the Final Four, Blue II was granted a special exemption and allowed to attend the festivities in Indianapolis. He quickly drew national media attention, appearing on national TV morning shows and newspapers across the country. An Associated Press story said "Forget Coach K, Magic or Sparty. The guy everyone wanted to see before Saturday's Final Four had four legs and fur." Yahoo Sports named Butler Blue II as the best mascot of the tournament, saying he "couldn't have been a bigger hit". "It used to be ... we could just slip in and out of places ... [Now] we usually get mobbed," remarked Kaltenmark. Next to then-head coach Brad Stevens, Blue II had become the "undisputed star" of Butler basketball, according to Eamonn Brennan.

After the season ended, Blue II's newfound fame continued, with appearances requested all around Central Indiana. He made an appearance at the Indianapolis Motor Speedway during Indianapolis 500 practice by special request of driver James Hinchcliffe and was called "one of the biggest celebrities in Indianapolis" by one source.

Interest in Blue II was renewed when Butler returned to the tournament in 2011. NCAA regulations again sidelined Blue, leading to a "Free Butler Blue" Twitter campaign. Despite being left home, Blue II garnered plenty of media attention. "We wanted to be ... with the team,” remarked Kaltenmark. "But at the same time, we were getting a ton more exposure staying home ... [Stevens] doesn't want the spotlight – he'd rather it be on Blue. So if we can serve that role and be a distraction for everyone else, all the better."

When the team made another surprise run to the Final Four in Houston, Blue II again got another exemption. To get to Houston, Blue II had to board a plane for only the second time in his life. Southwest Airlines allowed Blue II to join Kaltenmark in the main cabin of the plane, rather than relegating him to the cargo hold.

Once in Houston, Blue II's media attention reached new heights. Reporters crowded around Blue II and posed for pictures with him. He was profiled by ESPN, who called him "the star of the Butler Bulldogs," The Washington Post, who said he had "taken Houston by storm," and many others. The Star-Ledger called him a "four legged rock star". He appeared on CBS's The Early Show and the pre-game shows before Butler's games. The InterContinental hotel he stayed at even named a martini after Blue, with the proceeds going to charity.

During the 2012–13 season, a road tour was organized to introduce Blue II to the Atlantic 10 Conference. The tour drew local media attention throughout, and attracted national recognition when Blue II and Blue III had a "summit" with Georgetown's live bulldog mascots, Jack and Jack Jr. The tour allowed Blue II to take part in the pre-game ceremonies of several away games in addition to his normal appearances at all home games.

Butler has created a Blue II merchandise line which is sold on campus and online. A Fathead graphic has also been created.

=== Retirement ===
On January 24, 2013, it was announced that Blue II would retire at the end of the season. A "Changing of the Collar" ceremony took place prior to Butler's last home game of the 2012–13 season, against Xavier on March 9. His official retirement was on May 20, 2013. At that time, Blue III assumed the role of the new official mascot of Butler University. If Butler had made the Final Four, Blue II would have attended the event, but the Bulldogs lost in the third round of the NCAA tournament to Marquette.

Blue II had participated in training his successor since 2012. Kaltenmark, who also owns Blue III, had previously stated that Blue II had "several good years left" and no plans to retire.

=== Health problems and death ===
In June 2013, Blue II was diagnosed with Cushing's disease, an auto-immune disease that causes skin problems. In late July, he was diagnosed with dilated cardiomyopathy, a heart disease unrelated to Cushing's. The condition is non-reversible and affected both sides of his heart. Blue II was given medication to manage his symptoms. He was given just weeks to live and was not expected to make any further public appearances. Blue II died of congestive heart failure on August 31, 2013. He was 9 years old.

== Butler Blue I ==
The first Butler Blue (September 23, 2000 – May 30, 2014) was a female English bulldog, unlike her successors. She served from 2000 to 2004 and had white fur. Butler staff member Kelli Walker selected the all-white female from the Kings' litter and agreed to care for the dog on behalf of the university. The name "Butler Blue" was selected in a university-wide naming contest, and Blue made her debut as Butler's official mascot at a men's basketball game in February 2000 to a standing ovation in historic Hinkle Fieldhouse.

She served until Walker moved from Indianapolis in 2004, and lived the rest of her life with Walker. Blue I died in Chicago on May 30, 2014, and is buried alongside Blue II at a Bulldog Memorial on the Butler campus; the site was dedicated during Butler's homecoming weekend in September 2014.

== See also ==
- List of individual dogs
