= Henry Kahn =

American businessman and tailor

- Born: March 31, 1860; Bloomington, Indiana, U.S.
- Died: August 14, 1934 (aged 74); Indianapolis, Indiana, U.S.
- Resting place: Indianapolis Hebrew Congregation Cemetery South
- Known for: Kahn Tailoring Company
- Spouse: Sarah F. Lang

Henry Kahn (March 31, 1860 – August 14, 1934) was an American businessman and tailor who lived in Indianapolis, Indiana, and founded the Kahn Tailoring Company.

== Early life ==
Henry Kahn was born in Bloomington, Indiana, on March 31, 1860, to Isaac (1829–1887) and Bella (née Hirsch) Kahn (c. 1840 – 1886). Isaac emigrated from France in 1844 and settled in Bloomington, where he married Bella in 1856. Bella was the daughter of French immigrants who arrived in Louisiana prior to 1850 and eventually settled in Cincinnati, Ohio. Henry had two sisters, Clementine (1858–1914) and Cora (1868–1898). Isaac Kahn was a businessman and owned several clothing stores in Bloomington. In 1866, the Kahns moved to Indianapolis where Henry attended public schools before studying at Butler University.

== Career ==
Kahn entered the clothing business in 1886 when he opened a small tailoring shop on East Washington Street in downtown Indianapolis. In 1903, he founded the Kahn Tailoring Company and by 1913 Kahn had grown his business to include a retail building located at 7 North Meridian Street and a four-story manufacturing plant at 800 North Capitol Avenue. Kahn Tailoring Company eventually grew to become the largest manufacturer of men's and women's suits in the United States, with two thousand dealers and twelve retail stores located across the country. Kahn was also a major supplier of military uniforms to the United States during World War I and World War II.

Kahn Tailoring Company became the largest employer of Jewish immigrants in Indianapolis by working with the Industrial Removal Office (IRO) in New York City. The local IRO office in Indianapolis assisted newly arrived Jewish immigrants in locating jobs. The company offered support to its employees through its social welfare department that organized social gatherings, a baseball team, and a factory orchestra.

After his death in 1934, the Kahn Tailoring Company was managed by his son-in law. In 1954, it merged with the Globe Tailoring Company of Cincinnati, Ohio, and sold its manufacturing facility on Capitol Avenue. By 1970, there were no more Kahn stores in Indianapolis.

== Personal life ==
Henry married Sarah F. Lang (November 18, 1862 – June 30, 1952) in 1886. They had a daughter, Claribel.

In 1908, Kahn built a home at 101 E. 27th Street in Indianapolis. He later sold the home to the State of Indiana, where it served as the Indiana Governor's Mansion from 1919 to 1945. When the Governor's Mansion was moved to 4343 N. Meridian Street, the house was sold to the nearby Marott Hotel and was slated to serve as an exclusive clubhouse. However, due to prohibitive costs this plan was not carried out, and the house was demolished in 1962.

Kahn died on August 14, 1934, at the Marott Hotel in Indianapolis.
