= Frank Hedden =

Biographical details
- Born: August 18, 1904; Worthington, Indiana, U.S.
- Died: November 11, 1990 (aged 86); Carmel, Indiana, U.S.

Playing career

Football
- 1929: Butler

Coaching career (HC unless noted)

Football
- 1932–1941: Butler (freshmen)
- 1942–1945: Butler
- 1947–1948: Anderson (IN)
- 1949–1964: Butler (freshmen)

Basketball
- 1936–1942: Butler (assistant)
- 1942–1945: Butler
- 1946–1949: Anderson (IN)

Baseball
- 1945: Butler
- 1948: Anderson (IN)

Track and field
- 1932–1942: Butler (freshmen)
- 1946–1949: Anderson (IN)

Administrative career (AD unless noted)
- 1942–1945: Butler (acting AD)
- 1946–1949: Anderson (IN)

Head coaching record
- Overall: 12–7–2 (football); 63–40 (basketball); 6–7 (baseball)

Accomplishments and honors

Championships
- Football; 1 Hoosier (1948)

Frank Bullock "Pop" Hedden (August 18, 1904 – November 11, 1990) was an American college football, college basketball, college baseball, track, and tennis coach and college athletics administrator. He served as the head football coach at the Butler University in Indianapolis, Indiana from 1942 to 1945 at Anderson College—now known as Anderson University—in Anderson, Indiana from 1947 to 1948, compiling a career varsity college football coaching record of 12–7–2.

Hedden graduated from high school in Worthington, Indiana, where he played football, basketball, and baseball. He then moved on to Butler, letting in football, before graduating in 1931. He was appointed coach of freshman sports at Butler in 1932. Hedden assisted Tony Hinkle for six years with Butler's varsity basketball team before replacing Hinkle in 1942 as acting athletic director and head coach of the varsity football, basketball, and baseball teams while Hinkle was on leave serving in the military. In May 1946, Hedden was appointed head coach of the football and track teams at Anderson College. He also served as athletic director at Anderson and inaugurated the school's football team in 1947. He returned to Butler in 1949 as freshman football coach and instructor in physical education. Hedden retired from coaching in 1965 and from teaching in 1974.

Hedden also served as director of the Amateur Baseball Association and as safety director for the Indianapolis Department of Parks and Recreation. He died on November 11, 1990.

== Head coaching record ==
=== Football ===
| Year | Team | Overall | Conference | Standing | Bowl/playoffs |
|---|---|---|---|---|---|
Butler Bulldogs (Indiana Intercollegiate Conference) (1942–1945)
| 1942 | Butler | 2–7 | 1–2 | 9th | |
| 1943 | No team—World War II | | | | |
| 1944 | No team—World War II | | | | |
| 1945 | Butler | 3–3 | 3–2 | 4th | |
| Butler: | | 5–10 | 4–4 | | |
Anderson Ravens (Hoosier Conference) (1947)
| 1947 | Anderson | 1–5–2 | 0–4–1 | 7th | |
| 1948 | Anderson | 6–2 | 5–0 | T–1st | |
| Anderson: | | 7–7–2 | 5–4–1 | | |
| Total: | | 12–7–2 | | | |
National championship Conference title Conference division title or championship game berth
