= Butler Bulldogs =

Athletic teams that represent Butler University

- University: Butler University
- Nickname: Bulldogs
- NCAA: Division I (FCS)
- Conference: Big East (primary); Pioneer Football League
- Athletic director: Grant Leiendecker
- Location: Indianapolis, Indiana
- Varsity teams: 20
- Football stadium: Bud and Jackie Sellick Bowl
- Basketball arena: Hinkle Fieldhouse
- Baseball stadium: Bulldog Park
- Colors: Blue and white
- Mascot: Butler Blue IV
- Fight song: The Butler War Song
- Website: butlersports.com

The Butler Bulldogs are the athletic teams that represent Butler University, located in Indianapolis, Indiana. The Bulldogs participate in 20 NCAA Division I intercollegiate sports. After leaving the Horizon League following the 2011–12 season, nearly all teams competed in the Atlantic 10 Conference. The football team is a founding member of the non-scholarship Football Championship Subdivision (FCS)-level Pioneer League. On March 20, 2013, the Butler administration announced that the school would join the Big East, and moved to the new league July 1, 2013.

== Sports sponsored ==
Men's sports	Women's sports
Baseball	Basketball
Basketball	Cross country
Cross country	Golf
Football	Lacrosse
Golf	Soccer
Soccer	Softball
Tennis	Swimming & Diving
Track & field^{1}	Tennis
	Track & field^{1}
	Volleyball
^{1} – includes both indoor and outdoor.

The most recently added varsity sport is women's lacrosse, with Butler elevating its former club team to full varsity status for the 2016–17 school year (2017 season).

=== Men's basketball ===
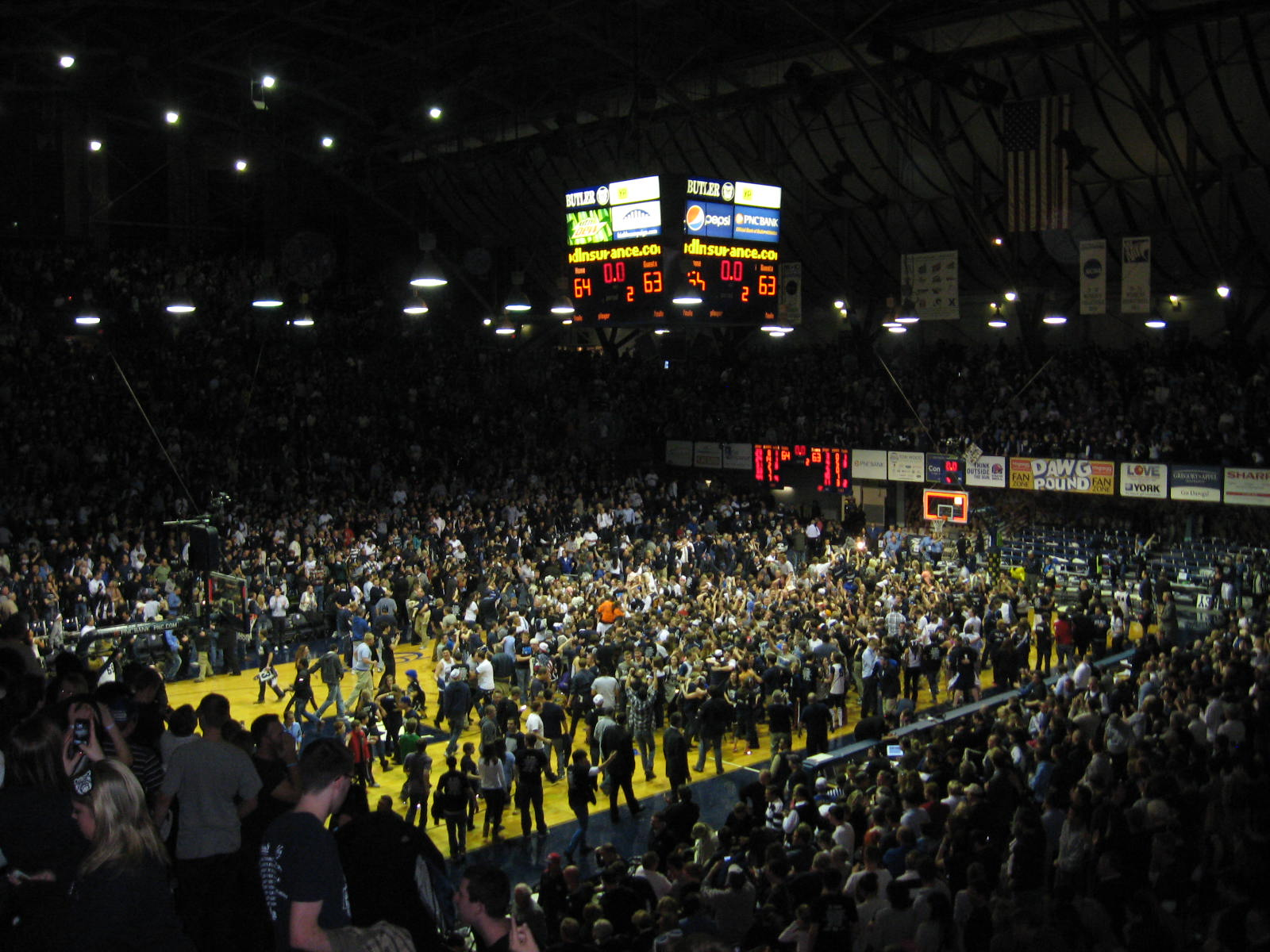
Butler students flood the court following the buzzer-beater victory over Gonzaga in 2013

Historically, the Butler basketball program competed in the Missouri Valley Conference from 1932 to 1934, the Mid-American Conference from 1946 to 1950, the Indiana Collegiate Conference from 1950 to 1978, the Horizon League from 1979 to 2012, the Atlantic 10 Conference for the 2012–13 season, and are now current members of the Big East.

Prior to the development of the NCAA tournament, Butler claimed the AAU national championship in 1924 and the national championship John J. McDevitt trophy by the Veteran Athletes of Philadelphia. The Bulldogs reached postseason play for the first time in 1958, and the team's first victory in postseason play came the following year when the Bulldogs made it to the NIT Quarterfinals. The Bulldogs have competed in the NIT postseason tournament seven times, twice reaching the quarterfinals.

The bulldogs qualified for the NCAA Division 1 Men's Basketball Tournament for the first time in 1962. In total, the Bulldogs have qualified or been selected for the NCAA tournament twelve times and boast a record of 19–12, including three sweet sixteen finishes and two national runner-up finishes.

Until moving to the "high-major" Big East Conference in 2013, the Butler basketball program had been considered one of the best "mid-major" basketball programs, having won at least 20 games and reached postseason play twelve of the last fourteen seasons, including appearances in nine NCAA tournaments where the Bulldogs reached the Sweet Sixteen in 2003 and 2007, as well as back-to-back Final Four and championship game appearances in 2010 and 2011. Since the start of the 2006–07 season, the Bulldogs have earned a 15–8 record against members of the BCS conferences, including a 7–2 record against the Big Ten. The program's success has been attributed to "The Butler Way", a now-unique style of team play that many have said harkens back to the Indiana glory days, as well as being called "the way the game should be played."

The Bulldogs' recent accomplishments include winning the 2001 BP Top of the World Classic, the 2006 NIT Season Tip-Off, the 2007 Great Alaska Shootout and the 2010 Diamond Head Classic. Individual honors include the selection of Butler junior guard AJ Graves as a Wooden Award National Player of the Year finalist in men's college basketball in 2007, the same year Head Coach Todd Lickliter was named the National Coach of the Year by the National Association of Basketball Coaches after winning the award for mid-season National Coach of the Year. In 2008, Senior Mike Green was the Chip Hilton Player of the Year Award Winner. In 2010 the Bulldogs made it to the Championship game, in Indianapolis, for the first time in school history. Sophomore Gordon Hayward entered the NBA draft and was a lottery pick by the Utah Jazz. Hayward was the first Butler player to play in the NBA since Ralph O'Brien in the early 1950s.

=== Women's basketball ===
The women's basketball program at Butler University began in the 1975–76 season, competing in the Association for Intercollegiate Athletics for Women (AIAW), and saw its first winning season two years later, earning a 9–5 record under the direction of coach Linda Mason. The Bulldogs played in the AIAW National Tournament for the first time in 1982, falling in the second round to William Penn, 77–94. The next year, the Bulldogs began competition at the NCAA Division II level and joined the Horizon League and Division I competition for the 1986–87 season.

The Bulldogs qualified for Division I post-season play for the first time in 1993, competing in the WNIT, and competed in the NCAA Division I women's basketball tournament for the first time in 1996. Their last post-season appearance in the 1990s was in the WNIT in 1998. The Bulldogs did not return to the post-season until 2009 and 2010 under head coach Beth Couture, who led the team to four consecutive 20-win seasons in 2008 through 2011.

=== Football ===
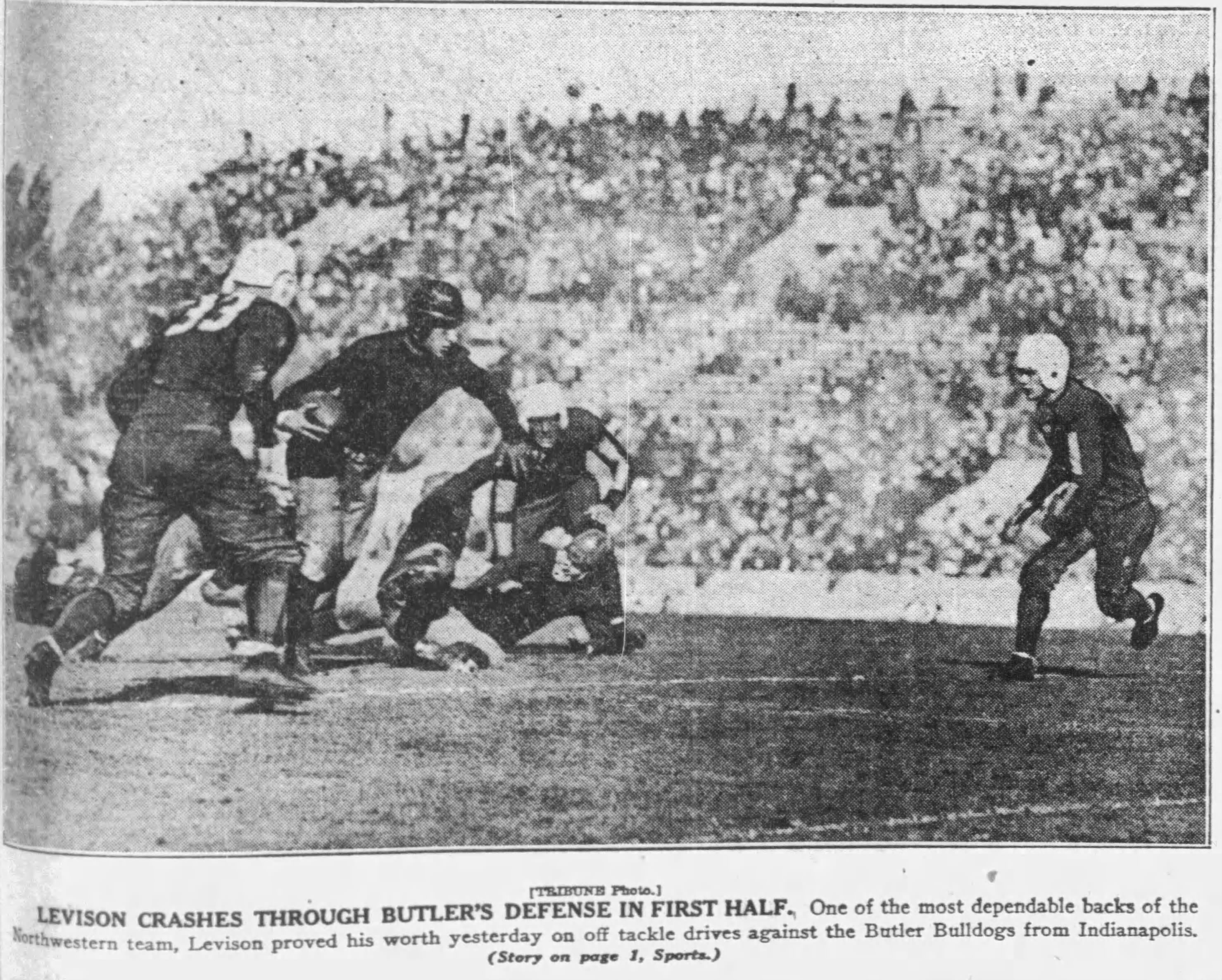
Butler football game in 1928

The Butler Bulldogs football program has a long history, beginning with Indiana's first intercollegiate football game at the old 7th Street Baseball Grounds in the spring of 1884. For the game between Butler and DePauw, Butler senior John F. Stone compiled the rules by combining association (soccer) rules with eastern intercollegiate rules to form the western intercollegiate rules, which were published by Charles Mayer of Indianapolis. Butler won the game by a score of four goals to one.

The Bulldogs have appeared in three Division II playoff games, the last in 1991 when it lost to eventual national champion Pittsburg State 26–16. The Bulldogs saw their greatest success in football over the course of 60 seasons from 1934 to 1994 when Bulldog football teams won 31 conference championships, including seven straight Indiana Collegiate Conference titles from 1934 to 1940, league titles in 1946, 1947, 1952, 1953, and seven straight from 1958 to 1964, all under Tony Hinkle.

Following the move from the College Division to NCAA Division II, Butler won 4 straight conference championships from 1972 to 1975, along with another one in 1977, all under the guidance of Bill Sylvester Sr. Ashland joined Butler and fellow ICC members to form the Heartland Collegiate Conference, in which Butler won league titles in 1983, 1985, and three straight from 1987 to 1989, under coach Bill Lynch. The Bulldogs also went the NCAA Division II playoffs in 1983 and 1988.

Butler and fellow HCC member schools joined with the Great Lakes Valley Conference to form the Midwest Intercollegiate Football Conference (now the Great Lakes Intercollegiate Athletic Conference). Butler added back to back league titles in 1991 and 1992 with Bob Bartlameo at the helm, including a trip to the NCAA Division II playoffs in 1991. The following season, Butler and member school Valparaiso moved up to NCAA Division I-AA (now Division I FCS) under the guidance of Ken LaRose to join with Dayton, Drake, Evansville, and San Diego to form the Pioneer Football League, in which Butler still competes. Butler capped its decade of dominance, seven league titles in ten years with three playoff berths, by winning another conference championship in 1994. The Dawgs were led by the great Arnold Mickens who broke numerous NCAA Division I rushing records, including eight straight 200 yard performances during the campaign.

The Bulldogs, led by Coach Jeff Voris, won the 2009 Pioneer Football League title by compiling a 7–1 league record and an 11–1 season overall. The conference title run included a come-from-behind 25–24 victory over Pioneer League preseason favorite San Diego, a 31–28 road win at Dayton (who also finished with a 7–1 league record), and a 20–17 title-clinching victory over Drake.

The Pioneer Football League title earned the Bulldogs a berth in the Gridiron Classic. It was Butler's first postseason appearance since 1991 when they were still a Division-II football program. Butler defeated Central Connecticut State 28–23 to win the Gridiron Classic in Indianapolis. In 2012 the Bulldogs were able to rattle of 7 consecutive league victories to secure the share of the PFL Championship. This is the third PFL Championship for the Dawgs, and its second in the last four years. In 2013, Butler became the first PFL team to compete in the FCS playoffs after the conference was given an automatic invitation, losing in the first round to Tennessee State.

==== Postseason ====
Season	Game	Winner		Runner-Up	
1983	Division II Playoffs	UC Davis	25	Butler	3
1988	Division II Playoffs	Tennessee-Martin	23	Butler	3
1991	Division II Playoffs	Pittsburg State	26	Butler	16
2009	Gridiron Classic	Butler	28	Central Connecticut State	23
2013	FCS Division Playoffs	Tennessee State	31	Butler	0

==== Hoosier helmet trophy ====
The Hoosier Helmet was established as the trophy helmet for the rivalry football game played between Butler and Valparaiso University.

The Hoosier Helmet was created prior to the 2006 season to commemorate the football rivalry that has existed since 1921. The helmet trophy was created to further intensify the rivalry between these two teams. A group of Butler players, along with their head coach, Jeff Voris, came up with the idea for the helmet. After Valparaiso head coach Stacey Adams agreed to play for the helmet, Butler equipment manager John Harding put the helmet together.

The white helmet is mounted on a hardwood plaque and features each team's logo on respective sides of the helmet. A gold plate is added each year to commemorate the winner and score of the contest. Currently, Butler holds a 14–7 series lead when playing for the Hoosier Helmet. Both Butler and Valparaiso compete in the NCAA FCS (formerly division I-AA), non-scholarship Pioneer Football League.

=== Track and field ===
==== Butler Relays ====
The Butler Relays were a prestigious American Track and Field competition, founded by track coach Herman Phillips who won three NCAA quartermile championships and was a member of the 1928 U.S. Olympic 1,600 meter gold medal relay team.

The event annually showcased 350–400 athletes representing 20–30 colleges and universities. From an attendance of 3,500, the games grew to attract over 10,000 spectators to Butler (Hinkle) Fieldhouse each March. The college's fraternities and sororities vied in yearly ticket sales, parade float, house decoration, and Relay Queen competitions. The University Division "Governor's Cup" went to each year's victor, with Indiana University claiming the inaugural trophy in 1933 and the University of Notre Dame taking the final prize in 1942. The University of Michigan captured the eight intervening awards. Butler claimed the College Division "Mayor's Trophy" between 1938 and 1941. In addition to the participation of legendary American Olympians Jesse Owens, Glenn Cunningham, Ralph Metcalfe, and IU's Don Lash, the Butler Relays saw ten world records set or tied during the meet's decade-long run.

When Phillips became head track and field coach at Purdue University in 1938, Lawrence Holmes directed the relays for one year. Butler alumnus and former world two mile (3 km) record holder Ray Sears staged the games from 1939 until the fieldhouse was dedicated to military use in 1942. The Butler Relays were not reinstituted after World War II because of the expense and the basketball program's influence over fieldhouse scheduling.

=== Soccer ===
Men's soccer at Butler began in 1989, and the women's team was added in 1991. In the program's 20-year history, the men's soccer team has made five post-season appearances, acquiring a 3–5 record in post-season play. The Bulldogs' last post-season appearance was in 2009. Butler's men's soccer qualified for the NCAA tournament in 1995, 1997, 1998, 2001 and 2009, reaching the round of 16 in 1995 and 1998. Butler won the Horizon League (formerly MCC) tournament title in 1995, 1997, 1998, 2001 and 2010. They also won or shared the regular season title seven times, including 1994, 1996, 1998, 2004, 2008, 2009, and 2010. The 1998 squad enjoyed national rankings as high as #8 in the country and the 2010 squad was ranked as high as #5 in the final National Soccer Coaches Association of America (NSCAA) poll. The Bulldogs won the 2016 Big East Championship.

=== Baseball ===
The Butler baseball team has been led since 2017 by Head Coach Dave Schrage. The program's success includes Horizon League regular season championships in 1996, 1998, and 1999, as well as Horizon League tournament titles in 1998 and 2000, providing berths to the NCAA Division I Baseball Championships. The Bulldogs also had 34-win seasons in 2002 and 2003, surpassing the 30-win season totals in 1998 and 2000. Notable alumni of the program include middle reliever pitcher Pat Neshek (2001), who played for the Minnesota Twins from 2006 to 2010, the St. Louis Cardinals where he was selected for the 2014 MLB All-Star Game, and currently the Philadelphia Phillies.

=== Softball ===
The Butler softball team has been led by Scott Hall for the last 5 seasons. In his first season, he set a new school record with 14 inner conference wins and a new record with 4 tournament game wins which tied the school record for best league finish in the 2010–2011 season. They have a notable assistant coach in Jenna Grim whom was a professional softball Player for the Chicago Bandits and an assistant with Northwestern University for two years. Her key responsibilities in the program are to work with the pitching staff and catchers. The other assistant coach is Jack Lewis who brings in over 30 years of coaching experience. Butler softball plays at the Butler Softball Field as their home field. The Bulldogs won the 2016 Big East Conference softball tournament, their first conference championship. As of April 7, 2015 the Bulldogs are ranked 158th in the nation.

=== Cross country ===
Some of Butler's most notable athletic accomplishments have come in Cross Country. Butler won thirteen Horizon League Championships in Men's Cross Country and twelve Women's Championships. Both the men and women won the Atlantic 10 Championships in 2012, their lone year in the conference. The Men's team has placed as high as 4th in the nation in recent years, earning a team trophy at the NCAA Division I championships in 2004. The women also earned an NCAA podium finish, placing 3rd in 2013. Both teams have frequently qualified for nationals in recent years, placing individuals as high as 3rd (Mark Tucker, 2003). All-Americans from the Butler Cross Country Team include Julius Mwangi, Justin Young, Fraser Thompson (a Rhodes Scholar), Mark Tucker, Olly Laws, Andrew Baker, Callum Hawkins, Mara Olson, Katie Clark, Erik Peterson, Olivia Pratt, and Euan Makepeace. Former coach, Joe Franklin, was named NCAA Division I Coach of the Year for leading the Bulldogs to their 2004 4th-place finish.

== Facilities ==
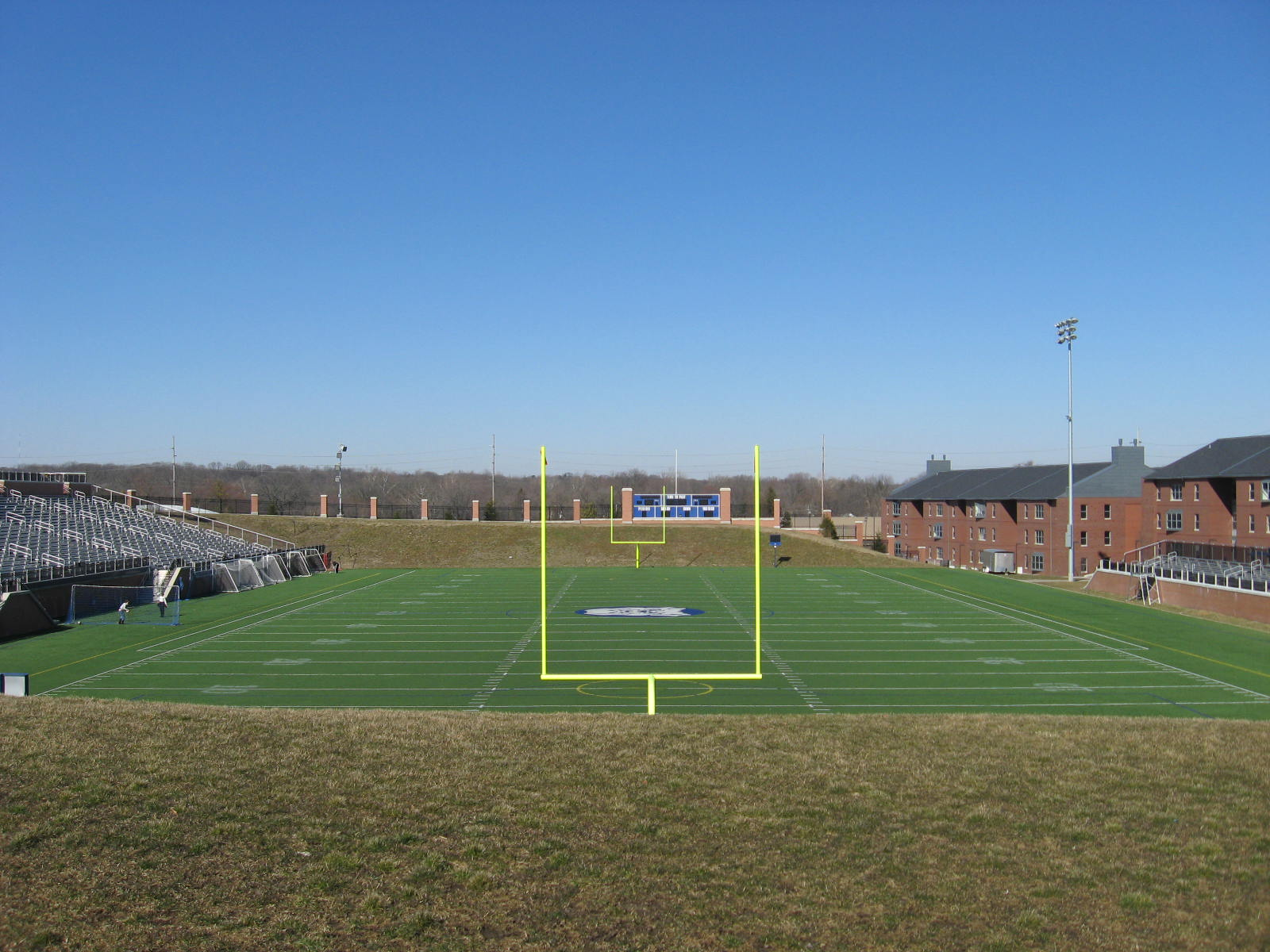
The Bud and Jackie Sellick Bowl, looking North.

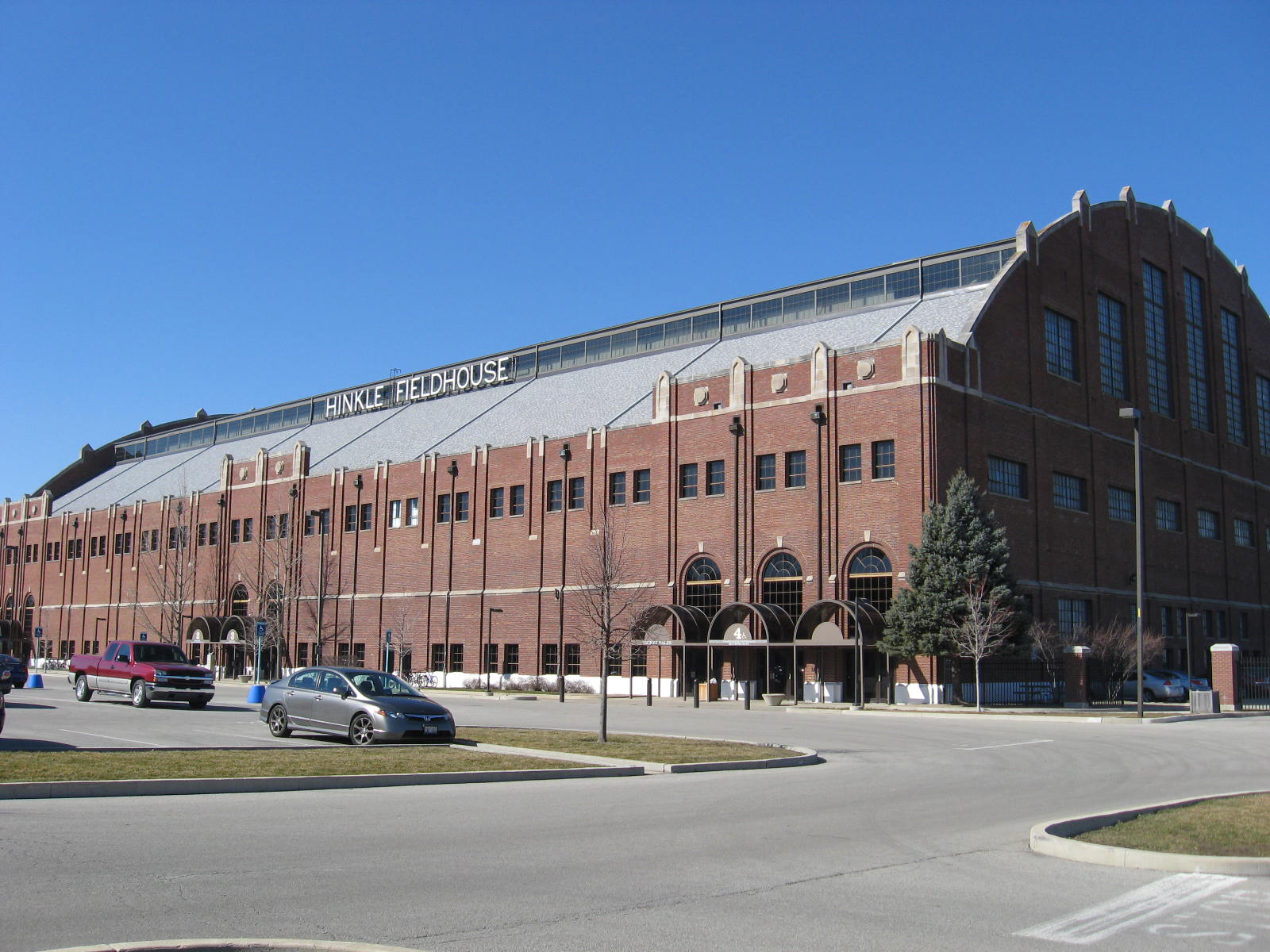
Hinkle Fieldhouse, a National Historic Landmark.

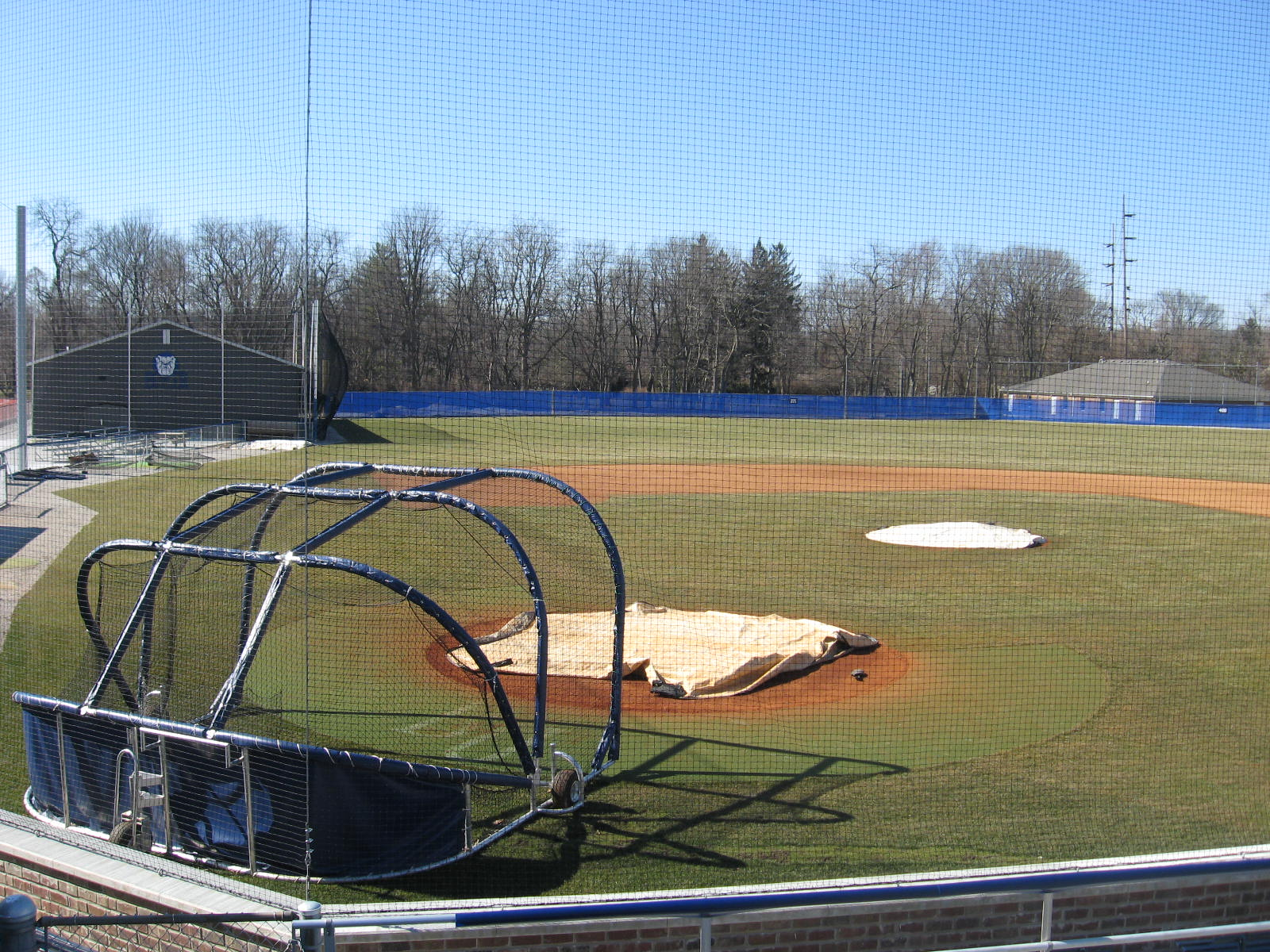
Bulldog Park.

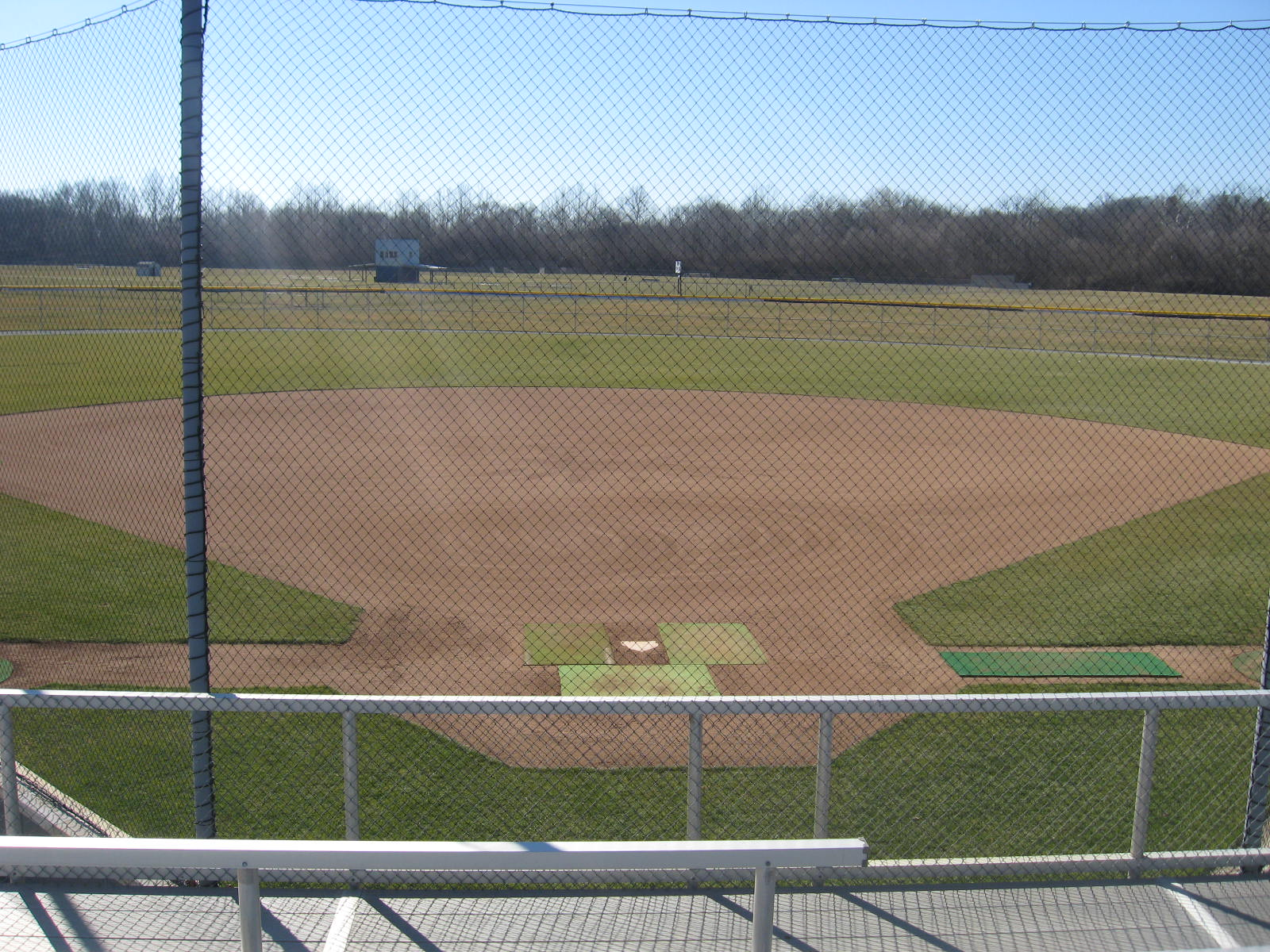
Butler Softball Field.

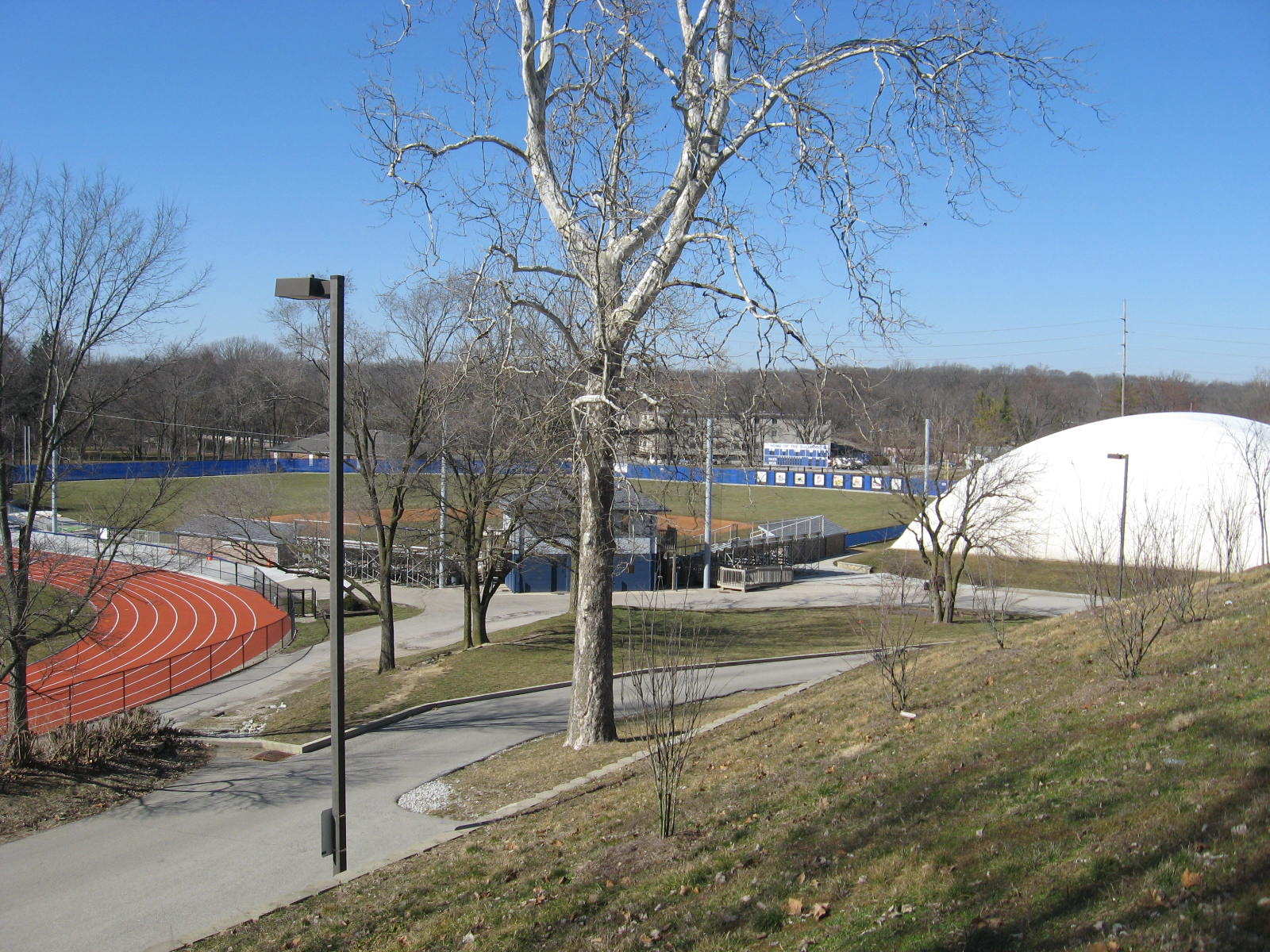
(Left to right) Davey Track and Field, Bulldog Park, Butler Bubble.

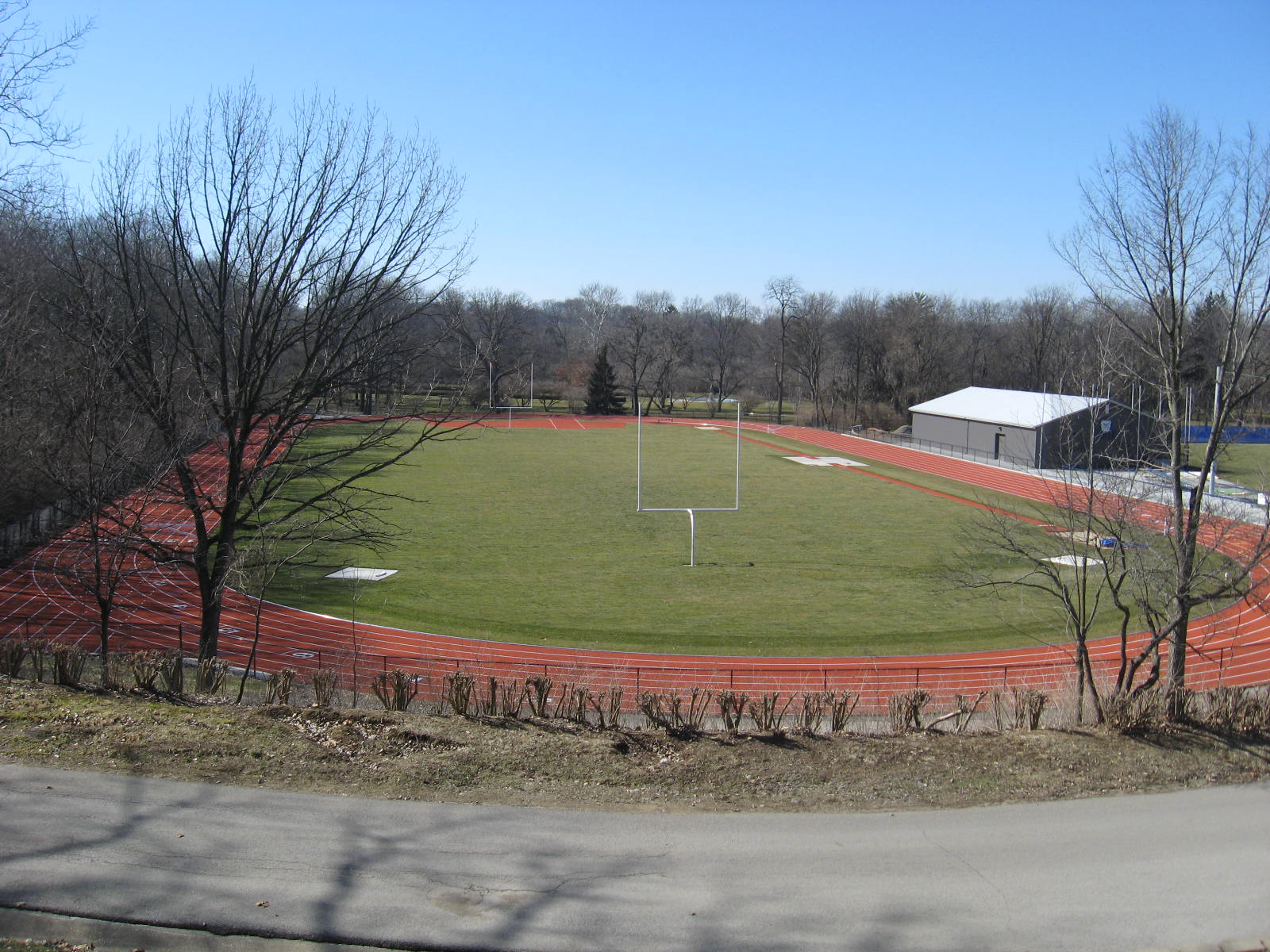
Davey Track and Field.

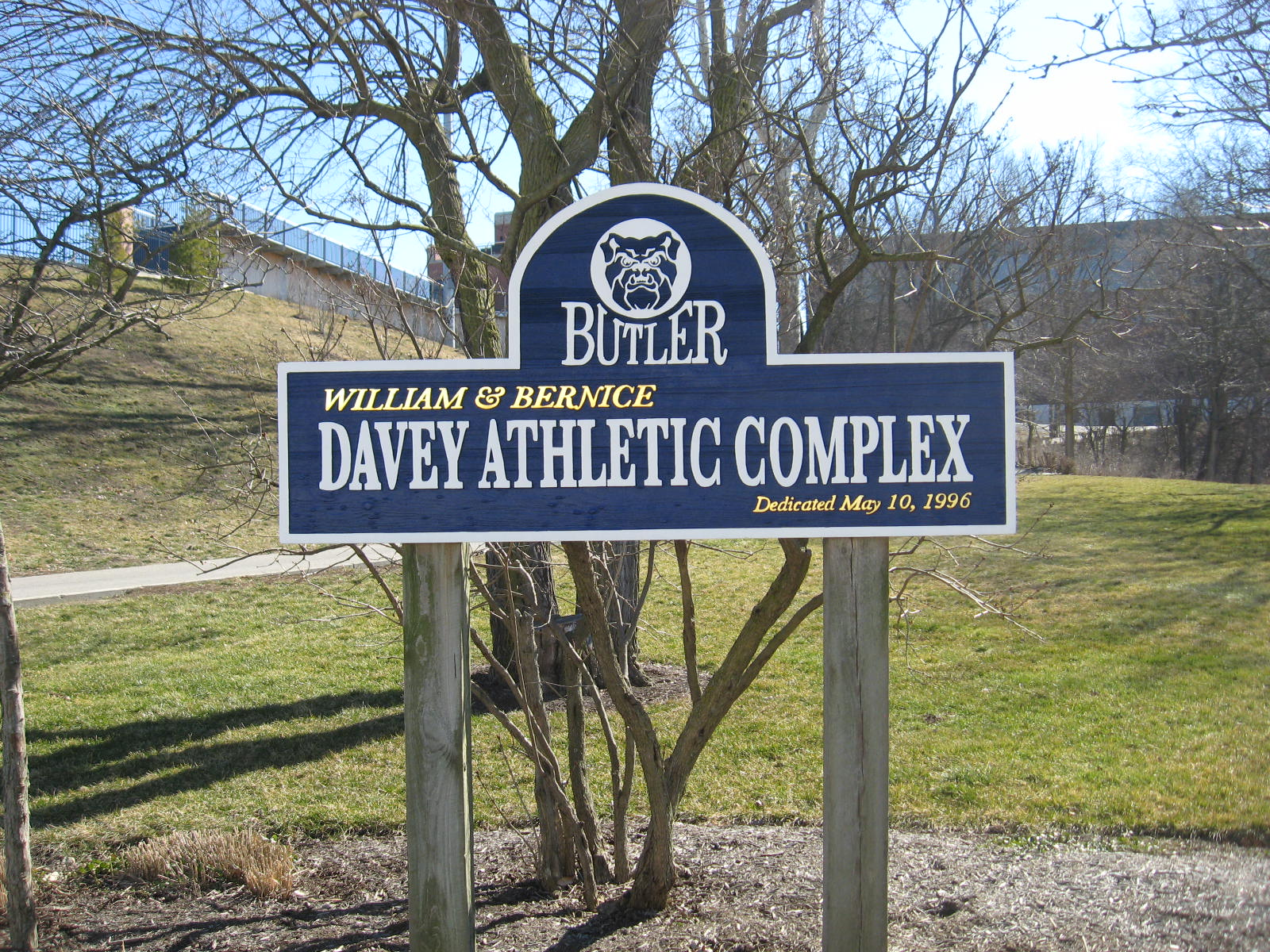
Welcome sign to the Davey Track and Field.

It was clear from the earliest days that athletics was destined to play a major role in shaping Butler University. When the school moved to its current Fairview campus location, two of the first structures completed were a 15,000-seat fieldhouse and a 36,000-seat football stadium.

=== Bud and Jackie Sellick Bowl ===
The football stadium, which came to be known as the Bud and Jackie Sellick Bowl (known as the Butler Bowl until 2017), was built in 1927. The original stadium had seating for 36,000 and hosted games versus the likes of the Four Horsemen from Notre Dame and Red Grange from Illinois. The Bowl was downsized to a 20,000-seat stadium in 1955 with the addition of the Hilton U. Brown Theatre, and is the home field for Butler football and soccer today. A 2006 renovation of the stadium included seating for 7,500, larger sidelines, and field turf, allowing it to host football, soccer, and other events. The new Student Apartment Housing overlooks the stadium on the east end, with the original seating on the west side of the stadium. A new press box and new seating on the west end and additional seating on the east end of the Bowl have been completed for the 2010 fall season. New lighting was completed in 2011 and was utilized for the first time during the 2012 season. New seating and the new entrance on the south end of the stadium were completed in time for the 2013 season. The new student hill is now located on the north end of the stadium.

=== Hinkle Fieldhouse ===
The fieldhouse, which was the largest of its kind when it was completed in 1928 and remained the largest in the U.S. for several decades, is a historical landmark. The Butler Fieldhouse, which was renamed Hinkle Fieldhouse in 1966, came to symbolize not only Butler athletics, but also Indiana "Hoosier hysteria." From its opening in 1928 until 1971, the building became the combined home of Butler basketball and the final rounds of the Indiana High School Athletic Association's basketball tournament. The legends of Indiana basketball, from Oscar Robertson to George McGinnis to Larry Bird, all played in the Fieldhouse at one time or another.

In 1954, Butler Fieldhouse hosted the historic final when Milan High School (enrollment 161) defeated Muncie Central High School (enrollment over 1,600) to win the state title. The state final depicted in the 1986 movie Hoosiers, loosely based on the Milan Miracle story, was shot in Hinkle Fieldhouse.

=== Varsity Field ===
Other facilities include Varsity Field, which serves as one of the homes of the Butler men's and women's soccer teams. A natural grass field, the complex gives the soccer teams a unique advantage in being able to play games and have practices on both the artificial surface of the Bud and Jackie Sellick Bowl and the natural surface of Varsity Field. Varsity Field features a covered area for both team benches, an elevated press box, a storage area for equipment and seating along the southern sideline for up to 500 spectators. The soccer teams are also able to take advantage of the practice fields located north of the main field.

=== Bulldog Park ===
Bulldog Park is the home of Butler's baseball program. It has a capacity of 500 spectators. Formerly both a baseball field and football practice facility, the park was converted to a baseball-only facility in the 1990s. Its dimensions are 330 ft. down the foul lines, 370 ft. to the gaps, and 400 ft. to center field.

=== Butler Softball Field ===
The Butler softball team calls the Butler Softball Field home, located adjacent to the Holcomb Gardens across the Inland Waterway Canal. The field is a part of a larger athletic field complex that features Varsity Field (the alternate field for both the men's and women's soccer teams), the outdoor tennis courts and intramural softball and soccer fields. The field features brick dugouts for both the home and visiting benches, a bullpen area and batting cages located down the first base line out of play and spectator seating for up to 500 people. The field's outfield dimensions extend to 200 feet (61 m) from foul pole to foul pole.

A minor renovation during the winter of 2007 saw new dirt added to the infield and regraded for a more consistent playing surface.

=== The Butler Bubble ===
The Butler Bubble is home to the Bulldog men's and women's tennis teams and is used as an indoor practice facility for the Butler baseball, football and soccer teams. All of the Butler tennis teams' home matches during the winter and early spring take place inside the bubble, which is located behind Hinkle Fieldhouse off of 52nd Street. The Bubble was originally constructed at the far west end of the Hinkle Fieldhouse parking lot, but was relocated to along the right field line of Bulldog Park after the original plot was broke for the construction of the new Health and Recreation Complex in the summer of 2005. The Bubble houses four hard-surface tennis courts as well as additional room for storage of equipment for both tennis teams. The bubble itself is supported by higher air pressure inside and is permanently fixed over the courts.

=== Davey Track and Field ===
Situated next adjacent to Bulldog Park as a part of the Davey Athletic Complex, the Davey Track & Field is used primarily by the Butler track & field teams and the football team for practices but is also utilized by the other athletics programs for conditioning.

=== Butler Health & Rec. Center ===
Butler University broke ground on its new, 85,000-square-foot (7,900 m^{2}) Health and Recreation Complex (HRC) in June 2005. The HRC offers many new services to students, faculty, and staff, while expanding others presently available. In addition to being the headquarters for Butler's department of recreation, the HRC also houses Counseling and Consultation Services, Health Education and Health Services, making it a wellness center on campus.

While the Fieldhouse provided a nationally acclaimed setting for Butler athletics, it was Paul D. "Tony" Hinkle, credited with inventing the orange basketball, who brought national recognition to the school as a coach and athletic administrator. He came to Butler in 1921 and remained with the university until his death in 1992. Hinkle served as a teacher, coach and athletic administrator for nearly half a century and compiled more than 1,000 victories with the school's football, basketball and baseball teams. The Bulldogs have carried on the winning traditions set forth by Hinkle. In the past decade, Butler teams have captured 26 conference championships (in four different leagues). The Bulldogs have made appearances in NCAA National Championship Tournaments in men's and women's basketball, men's soccer, volleyball, men's cross country, lacrosse, and baseball. Butler won the James J. McCafferty trophy, awarded annually by the conference for all-sports excellence based on conference championship points, five times, including three-straight from 1996–97 to 1998–99 and back-to-back years in 2001–02 and 2002–03.

== Butler mascots ==
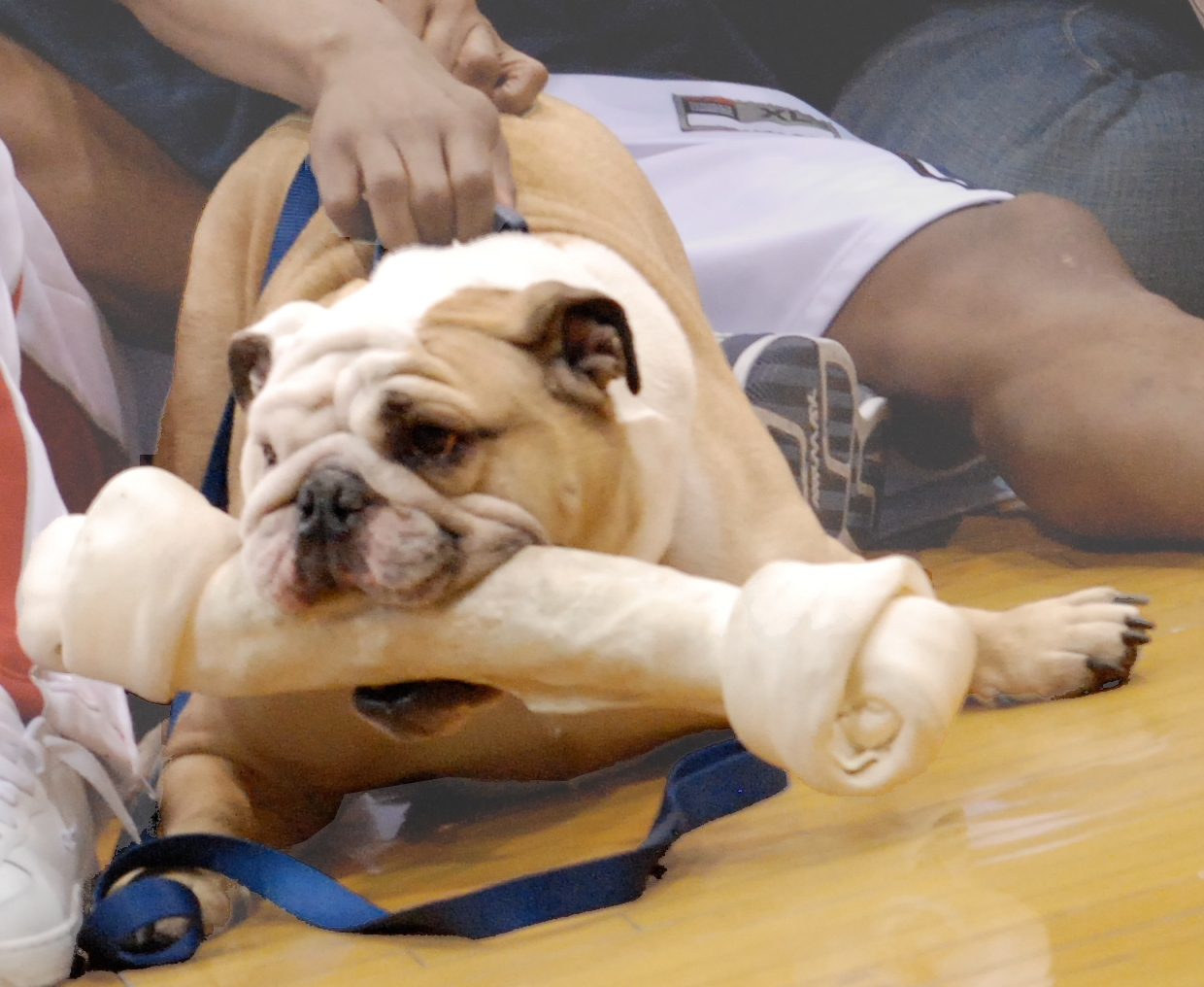
Butler Blue II pictured in 2008

Butler University was originally founded as North Western Christian University by Ovid Butler in 1855. He chose "Christians" as the school mascot. Sometime after the school had been renamed in honor of its founder, Butler was suffering a poor football season in 1919. As losses mounted, people grew wary of the "Christians" nickname. Before a big game against the rival Franklin "Baptists", the Butler Collegian was trying to conceive of a way to fire people up when "Shimmy", a bulldog owned by one of the fraternities, wandered into their office. Shimmy inspired cartoonist George Dickson to draw a bulldog labeled "Butler" taking a bite out of John the Baptist. Butler lost the game, but the nickname "Bulldogs" stuck.

Eventually, the bulldog was selected as the official mascot of the university. For many years, Butler had unofficial live bulldog mascots that kept by various fraternities. In 2000, Butler Blue became the school's first official live mascot. To date, there have been four dogs to carry the name "Blue", the university's primary color, with the fourth officially assuming mascot duties for the 2020–21 school year.

- Butler Blue I (September 23, 2000 – May 30, 2014) – one NCAA Sweet 16 appearance (2003) and two Horizon League McCafferty All-Sports Championships (2002, 2003). Term of service: 2000–2003
- Butler Blue II (March 27, 2004 – August 31, 2013) – Two NCAA National Championship appearances (2010 & 2011), three Sweet 16 appearances (2007, 2010, 2011) and three Horizon League McCafferty All-Sports Championships (2007, 2010, & 2011). Term of service: 2004–2013
- Butler Blue III ("Trip") (December 23, 2011 – ) – Became Butler's new mascot on May 20, 2013. Trip had been announced as Blue II's successor on March 9, immediately before the school's last home men's basketball game of the season. Retired at the end of the 2019–20 school year. At the same time, Michael Kaltenmark, who became mascot handler when Blue II assumed the role, retired from the handling role, although he remains in his regular university job and continues in a behind-the-scenes role in the mascot program. Term of service: 2013–2020
- Butler Blue IV ("Blue") (October 30, 2019 – ) – Announced as Trip's successor on January 22, 2020, and unveiled to the public two days later. Kaltenmark's role as mascot handler was taken over by Butler alumnus and employee Evan Krauss.

In addition to "Blue," a person in bulldog costume also performs as "Hink" for various Butler University athletic and university events.

== Conference affiliation ==
Butler first joined a Division I conference in 1932 when the men's basketball team joined the Missouri Valley Conference. Other sports joined conferences in later years. On May 2, 2012, it was made official that Butler would join the Atlantic 10 Conference beginning in the 2013 season. However, the timeline was later shortened so that the Bulldogs would begin competition beginning in the 2012 season. On August 1, 2012, Butler announced it joined the Metro Atlantic Athletic Conference for women's golf following the school's split with the Horizon League, where the Bulldogs won all but two of the conference's championships in the sport. On March 20, 2013, the Butler administration announced that the school would join the reconfigured Big East, and moved to the new conference on July 1, 2013.

Years	Football	Men's basketball	Women's basketball	Women's golf
1932–1943	Indiana Collegiate Conference	Missouri Valley Conference	–	–
1944–1950	Indiana Collegiate Conference	Mid-American Conference	–	–
1951–1977	Indiana Collegiate Conference	Indiana Collegiate Conference	–	–
1978–1985	Heartland Collegiate Conference	Midwestern City Conference	Midwestern City Conference	–
1986–1992	Heartland Collegiate Conference	Midwestern Collegiate Conference	Midwestern Collegiate Conference	–
1993–2003	Pioneer Football League	Horizon League	Horizon League	–
2003–2012	Pioneer Football League	Horizon League	Horizon League	Horizon League
2012–2013	Pioneer Football League	Atlantic 10	Atlantic 10	MAAC
2013–present	Pioneer Football League	Big East	Big East	Big East
