= Blake Beemer =

American baseball coach (born 1991)

Current position
- Title: Head coach
- Team: Butler
- Conference: Big East
- Record: 67–151 (.307)

Biographical details
- Born: March 4, 1991 (age 35)

Playing career
- 2010–2013: Ball State
- Positions: Outfielder, First baseman

Coaching career (HC unless noted)
- 2014–2015: Penn State (OF)
- 2016–2018: Eastern Illinois (RC)
- 2019–2022: Ball State (RC)
- 2023–present: Butler

Head coaching record
- Overall: 67–151 (.307)
- Tournaments: NCAA: 0–0

Blake Thomas Beemer (born March 4, 1991) is a baseball coach and former outfielder and first baseman, who is the current head baseball coach of the Butler Bulldogs. He played college baseball at Ball State.

== Playing career ==
Beemer grew up in Dayton, Ohio, where he attended Northmont High School, where he was a three-year letterwinner for the Thunderbolts in baseball, but also participated in soccer. He batted .422 as a senior in 2009.

Beemer enrolled at Ball State University, where he played baseball for the Cardinals. In 2010, his freshman year, he appeared in 51 games (making 45 starts), slashing .328/.448/.846 with 2 home runs, 28 runs batted in (RBIs), 11doubles, and 40 runs scored. Following his freshman performance, Beemer entered the 2011 season with high expectations for his sophomore year. A sophomore slump which saw his batting average fall to .212 by March 7. By the end of the year, his batting average had climbed to .273, with 1 home run. In the 2012 season as a junior, Beemer hit 0 home runs and 9 doubles. Beemer had a better senior year, leading the team in doubles (16), triples (3) and walks (28).

== Coaching career ==
Beemer began his coaching career as an volunteer assistant for the Penn State Nittany Lions, where he worked with the team's outfielders and coached first base.

Beemer was hired by the Eastern Illinois Panthers in the summer of 2015. He was named the top assistant and recruiting coordinator. He aided in recruiting Trey Sweeney and Will Klein, each of which went in the top five rounds of the 2021 Major League Baseball draft and 2020 Major League Baseball drafts, respectively. He returned to Ball State in the fall of 2018, being named the recruiting coordinator for the Cardinals.

On June 21, 2022, Beemer was named the head coach of the Butler Bulldogs.

== Head coaching record ==
Record table
Season	Team	Overall	Conference	Standing	Postseason
Butler Bulldogs (Big East Conference) (2023–present)
2023	Butler	12–43	5–16	8th	
2024	Butler	20–35	5–16	8th	
2025	Butler	15–39	4–17	7th	
2026	Butler	20–34	9–12	T–5th	
Butler:		67–151 (.307)	23–61 (.274)		
Total:		67–151 (.307)			
National champion Postseason invitational champion Conference regular season champion Conference regular season and conference tournament champion Division regular season champion Division regular season and conference tournament champion Conference tournament champion
