= Victor C. Twitty =

American biologist and embryologist

- Born: November 5, 1901
- Died: March 22, 1967 (aged 65)
- Scientific career
- Fields: biology and embryology

Victor Chandler Twitty (November 5, 1901 — March 22, 1967) was an American biologist and embryologist. Twitty was chair of the biological sciences department, Stanford University, president of the American Society of Zoologists, a member of the National Academy of Sciences, and the American Academy of Arts and Sciences, Herzstein Professor of Biology, and a Guggenheim fellow. Born in Martin County, Indiana, he graduated from Butler College in 1925, received a doctorate from Yale University in 1929, and joined faculty of Stanford in 1932, becoming full professor in 1936.

The New York Times called Twitty "a distinguished embryologist". The National Academy of Sciences called him "a master experimentalist in....the laboratory bench and the mountain terrain and streams of the American West".
