= Jack McKay (coach) =

American sports coach

Biographical details
- Born: January 16, 1886; Franklinville, New York, U.S.

Playing career

Football
- 1903–1906: Westminster (PA)

Coaching career (HC unless noted)

Football
- 1907–1908: Butler
- 1910: Butler

Basketball
- 1907–1909: Butler

Baseball
- 1909: Butler

Head coaching record
- Overall: 10–6–4 (football); 9–6 (basketball); 1–6 (baseball)

John G. McKay (born January 16, 1886) was an American college football, college basketball, and college baseball coach. He served as the head football and basketball coach at Butler University in Indianapolis, Indiana.

== Head coaching record ==
=== Football ===
Year	Team	Overall	Conference	Standing	Bowl/playoffs
Butler Christians (Independent) (1907–1908)
1907	Butler	1–3–2			
1908	Butler	5–0–1			
Butler Christians (Independent) (1910)
1910	Butler	4–3–1			
Butler:		10–6–4			
Total:		10–6–4			
