= Clotilde Betances Jaeger =

Feminist writer and journalist

- Born: Clotilde Betances Jaeger; 1890; San Sebastián, Puerto Rico
- Died: 1970 (aged 79–80); New York, New York
- Occupations: feminist writer and journalist

Clotilde Betances Jaeger (born 1890 - died ca. 1970) was a feminist writer and journalist of New York's Puerto Rican intellectual community during the mid-twentieth century. She advocated for Hispanic women's rights. Once a teacher and a lifetime educational advocate, she pushed for minority children's education in New York and supported educational reforms in Puerto Rico. She is best known for her written work in newspapers and journals in Puerto Rico and New York. though she was also featured in other Latin American and European publications. Betances Jaeger was also a grand-niece of Ramón Emeterio Betances, a Puerto Rican independence leader.

== Biography ==
=== Early life and education ===
Clotilde Betances was born in San Sebastian, Puerto Rico in 1890 to a Spanish mother and Puerto Rican father. Her early education — elementary and secondary schools — took place in Mayaguez and Santurce.

She moved to the United States in 1912 for undergraduate study in natural sciences at Cornell University. Betances took summer classes in Puerto Rico to study Spanish language and literature, graduating from Cornell in 1916. She spent the next seven years in Puerto Rico teaching in public schools in Naguabo, Quebradillas, Santurce, Rio Piedras.

In 1923, she moved to New York to teach with Beth Jacob Teachers' Seminary of America and stayed in the United States for the remainder of her life. In 1949, Betances earned a master's degree in religious study from Butler University in Indianapolis, where she wrote her graduate thesis, "Organizing a Program of Weekday Religious Education in the Bronx Community" advocating for educational rights for Puerto Rican children living in the Bronx. She later studied at both the Sorbonne of Paris and the University of Salamanca in Spain. She married Frank Jaeger, a North American of German heritage.

=== Career ===
Her writing career began in 1921 with her published essay, "Amor y Servicio" ("Love and Service"), for which she won the Ateneo Puertorriqueño (Puerto Rican Atheneum) award. In 1924, Betances Jaeger addressed her writing to the middle-class and upper-class Puerto Rican women readers of the San Juan newspaper Heraldo de Puerto Rico column, "Lectura para las damas: Deporte y literatura." Writing for this column shaped Betances Jaeger's early career as a "reporter and mediator of the women’s beauty and fashion." This part of her career marked Betances Jaeger's recognition that women's physical image played an important symbolic role in the wider understanding of women's progress in society. Within a few months, she gained charge of the Information Department of the Heraldo de Puerto Rico whose mission was to inform readers about the educational systems in Puerto Rico and in the U.S. mainland.

Over the years, Betances Jaeger was published in New York's Grafico (Illustrated) (1927–1931), Revista de Artes y Letras (Journal of Arts and Letters) (1933–1945), and Pueblos Hispanos (Hispanic Peoples) (1943–1944), Nueva York Al Dia (New York to Date), and Ebenezer: Iglesia Discipulos de Cristo de Habla Espanola de Nueva York (Ebenezer: Disciples of Christ Church for the Spanish-Speaking in New York), as well as Puerto Rico's Puerto Rico Ilustrado (Puerto Rico Illustrated), La Democracia (Democracy), Alma Latina (Latin Soul), and El Mundo (The World). In addition to her contributions to other Latin American publications, her work was featured in the Spanish anarchist magazines Estudios: Revista Eclectica (Studies: Eclectic Review), Iniciales (Initials), and Al Margen (On the Edge).

She wrote about prominent Hispanic feminists of the era, including Uruguayan poet Juana de Ibarbourou, Puerto Rican physician Marta Robert de Romeo, Cuban writer Ofelia Rodriguez Acosta, Spanish writer Concha Espina, and Cuban feminist Mariablanca Sabas Aloma.

== Key Ideas ==
Betances Jaeger's work over the years focused on topics of socialism, women's issues, music, and religion. She was opposed to US imperialism and US interests in Latin American nations as well as a proponent of Panhispanism. She took stands against “the colonization and ‘civilization’ task of the US in Puerto Rico and Latin America." She advocated for Hispanic women’s participation both in the economy and the opposition to war. She focused on the needs of children and the rights of Hispanic women. She took stands against physical abuse, infidelity, as well as man’s concept of women as property. Ultimately, she called for the reconsideration of the patriarchal standards informing Puerto Rican intellectualism during the 1930s.

=== Religious beliefs ===
Christianity informed her social, political, and economic justice work in the lives of New York Puerto Ricans (e.g., working for women’s rights and children’s educational rights). She sought to reemphasize Spanish heritage and the Christian faith as cultural foundations for New York’s Puerto Rican community. Betances Jaeger’s Protestant faith influenced her work as an advocate for New York’s Puerto Rican community. In the introduction to her graduate thesis, she wrote: "[t]wo things had to be done: Keep alive in the breast of Puerto Ricans the passion of their Spanish cultural inheritance ... and plant in them the spirit of God."

Betances Jaeger wrote in Ebenezer (April–June 1950) an article called "Educo a mi hijo" ("I Educate My Son"), a “biblical interpretation of David’s selfishness and paternal irresponsibility", advocating for the role of family in children's education. She emphasizes the role of God and religion in the strength of a family.

=== Challenges to US imperialism ===
Betances Jaeger was one of many Latin American feminists who saw the importance of a Panhispanic feminism "based on a shared sense of identity and struggle against US imperialism." This pan-Hispanic feminist movement took place amidst a political climate where US feminists “presumed superiority and assumed leadership.”

In 1929, feminist Carrie Chapman Catt condemned Latin American feminists (“South American women”) of “what she perceived to be their lack of education and lack of helpful engagement in building peaceful relations among the Americas." Betances Jaeger responded, along with various others, that women throughout Latin America (not only South America) had "a central conception of peace", adding that this notion of peace "promoted freedom of all the Americas and critiqued US imperialism."

=== Challenges to traditional, conservative role of Hispanic women ===
In Grafico, she wrote a four-part series about the "New Woman," where she pushed back against Maria Mas Pozo. Pozo perceived a role of Christianity, Catholicism, and US imperialist efforts in the oppression of Puerto Rico and the world. In response to Pozo, Betances Jaeger emphasized the importance of women's responsibility in fighting to improve the Puerto Rican economy in the fight to gain political independence. She stressed that economic issues are also women's issues. Betances Jaeger argued that meaningful political participation requires women to “forget about trifiling matters, social conventions, and rotten prejudices."

== Recognition ==
Betances Jaeger was most recognized for her writing for Grafico and Artes y Letras. Contributions to Artes y Letras were what distinguished Betances Jaeger in New York's Hispanic intellectual circles. She made contributions to the publication “at least until the 1950s."

Betances Jaeger made huge strides in her career, particularly as a feminist scholar, by writing for Grafico in the US. Grafico had a readership of Spanish-speakers in New York, particularly Puerto Ricans, as well as Cubans and Dominicans. The publication called on its readers to resist “ethnic oppression” and claim citizenship rights as Americans. By 1929, the magazine included international and national news coverage affecting Spanish-speaking populations. Martha Patterson describes the publication as promoting a Pan-Hispanic worldview. The publication also included “full pages of photographs, a women’s column, fashion advice, popular culture updates, cartoons, and classified ads.”

Betances Jaeger's writings to Grafico made important contributions to feminist discourse. Grafico was owned & edited by “tobacco workers, writers, and theater actors” (including Bernardo Vega and Alberto O’Farrill). Grafico has been known for its conservative and misogynistic representations of Hispanic women's role in society. Betances Jaeger's feminist contributions to Grafico changed this narrative through repurposing the previously traditional women's column, “Charlas Femininas” ("Feminine Chats"), as an “open space for feminist dialogues and discussions." She wrote more than 50 articles for Grafico between 1929 and 1930, where she discussed “the new role of Hispanic women in the United States according to the discourse of American modernity and the New Woman."

=== Accolades ===
Beyond her fame in the Hispanic intellectual community of New York City (NYC), Betances Jaeger has been compared to “women of the feminist avante-garde” such as Federica de Montseny, Violeta Miqueli, and Angela Graupera. Betances Jaeger was a member of the Asociación de Escritores y Periodistas Puertorriqueños (Association of Puerto Rican Writers and Journalists) and was the Puerto Rican representative for the Union de Mujeres Americanas (American Women's Union). Betances Jaeger belonged to Circulo Cultural Cervantes (Cervantes Cultural Circle) and made presentations at various meetings there. She gave public lectures at various Hispanic civic and cultural organizations in NYC, such as “La tragedia social del hombre” ("The social tragedy of man") on March 24, 1933, for the Hispano America Lodge No. 233 literary festival. She gave a lecture for the Fraternidad Estudiantil Hispanoamericana (Spanish American Student Fraternity) about Julia de Burgos’ poetry on April 18, 1940. Betances Jaeger was publicly recognized for her “defense of Hispanic women” by Cuban feminist Mariblanca Sabas Aloma.

== Written work ==
=== Notable works ===
- “La Mujer Nueva” ("The New Woman") published in Grafico caused debate about feminism, specifically around the topics of professionalism, women's control over their own bodies and thought, the use of contraceptives, and women's place in the job market and public as well as in private spaces.
- In “Matrimonio y mortaja del cielo bajan” ("Marriage and mummification descend from the Heavens"), published on January 20, 1929, she advocates for the right to divorce and questions the power of men and the Church over women.
- “Hay que respetar a la mujer” ("Women must be respected"), published on September 21, 1929, is a consciousness-raising piece.
- In “La union constituye la fuerza” (“In unity there is power”), published in October 1929, she supports Panhispanism.
- “El Derecho Divino de Los Blancos” (“The Divine Right of the Whites”), published on September 30, 1939, in Puerto Rico Ilustrado, a Puerto Rican cultural publication, offers a critical eye on racism. In this article, Betances Jaeger praises the liberation work of her uncle, Ramon Emeterio Betances. She also discusses children's education as a tool to empower youth of color and challenge “racial slavery.”

=== Unpublished works ===
- Various unpublished writings of Betances Jaeger remain, according to the research of literary critic and historian Josefina Rivera de Alvarez. Rivera de Alvarez claims these pieces include a novel, a couple of plays, and a brief biography of Betances Jaeger's uncle, Ramón Emeterio Betances.
