= Mary Jane Brown =

American professor (1895–1976)

- Born: October 14, 1895; Indiana, U.S.
- Died: 1976 (aged 80–81); Indianapolis, Indiana
- Education: Butler University; Washington University in St. Louis; University of Oklahoma
- Occupation: academic
- Known for: First doctorate earned from the University of Oklahoma

Mary Jane Brown (1895–1976) was an American academic and World War II nurse who was the first person to earn a doctorate from the University of Oklahoma. She went on to teach at the University of Wyoming and Oakland City University.

== Biography ==
Mary Jane Brown was born on October 14, 1895, in Indiana. She attended a one-room country school for her early education before earning her bachelor's degree from Butler University. She went on to earn her master's degree from Washington University in St. Louis, Missouri, and study at the University of Chicago, before earning her doctorate from the University of Oklahoma for her dissertation Comparative Studies in the Animal Ecology of Oak Hickory Forests in Missouri and Oklahoma. She was the first graduate student to receive a doctoral degree from the University of Oklahoma, completing her degree in 1929.

During World War II, Brown was a private in the Women's Army Corps. After the war, she went on to teach at several schools including thirteen years at the University of Wyoming and then at Oakland City University (1957–1961). She wrote An Introduction to Eugenics (1935) and A Scientific Vocabulary for Beginning Zoology Students and Non-Scientific Students (1957). After her retirement she worked as a leukemia researcher at the Indiana Medical Center.

Brown died in September 1976 in Indianapolis.
