= Wellness Pet Company =

Pet food manufacturer

- Type: Privately held subsidiary
- Industry: Pet food
- Predecessor: WellPet, Old Mother Hubbard, Eagle Pack Pet Foods, Inc.
- Founded: 1926 (Old Mother Hubbard); 1970 (Eagle Pack Pet Foods); 1997 (Wellness Pet Food); 2008 (WellPet LLC); 2022 (Wellness Pet Company)
- Headquarters: Tewksbury, Massachusetts, United States
- Products: Natural dog & cat food, treats, and dental chews
- Number of employees: 400+
- Parent: Clearlake Capital
- Website: http://www.wellnesspet.com

Wellness Pet Company is a pet food company that consists of Wellness Natural Pet Food, Old Mother Hubbard by Wellness, Whimzees by Wellness, Sojos, Eagle Pack and Holistic Select purchased by Clearlake Capital. Wellness Pet Company is headquartered outside of Boston, in Tewksbury, Massachusetts, as well as in Boston proper.

== History ==
=== Old Mother Hubbard ===

Old Mother Hubbard was founded in 1926, as an offshoot of the A. Hubbard and Sons Bakery in Gloucester, Massachusetts, making small dog biscuits. In 1961, the company was purchased by Jim Scott, a professional in animal nutrition, and moved to Lowell, Massachusetts. In the 1990s, Jim Scott Jr., then CEO of the company, worked with a team of animal nutrition experts to develop the Wellness brand dog and cat foods, which went on the market in 1999 and 2000, respectively. Old Mother Hubbard became a member of the WellPet family of brands in 2009. WellPet was purchased by Clearlake Capital Group L.P. in November 2020, and later renamed the Wellness Pet Company. A year later, the company opened new offices in Boston, MA. The company also continues to make Old Mother Hubbard branded products, including dog biscuits and other treats.

=== Wellness Pet Food ===
Wellness Pet Food was founded in 1997. Wellness recipes for dogs were introduced in 1997 and Wellness cat recipes were added to the line in 2000. By 2004, Wellness Pet Food became the leading natural pet food in independent pet specialty retailers. In 2022, the company began producing Good Dog by Wellness, an additional brand of dog treats.

=== Eagle Pack ===
Eagle Pack started in 1970, producing their Hy-Ration brand dog food. In 2000, the Eagle Pack Holistic Select line was launched. Eagle Pack has sponsored “The Last Grace Race on Earth”, an Iditarod Trail event. All Eagle Pack recipes are made in the United States and their own manufacturing facility.

=== WellPet ===
In October 2007, Eagle Pack was sold to Berwind Corporation for an undisclosed amount. In August 2008 Wellness/Old Mother Hubbard was sold to Berwind for $400 Million, generating a 7x profit on Catterton's initial investment. Between 2008 and 2009, Eagle and OMH were merged into a single entity, Wellpet LLC.

=== Sojo's ===
In January 2016, Wellness Pet Company acquired Sojo's for an undisclosed amount.

=== Whimzees ===
In 2017, the company acquired Whimzees (stylized as “WHIMZEES”), a producer of dog chews. Products from Whimzees have included variety packs, daily use packs, brushzees (a dental health pack), and Stix (a chewable dental health treat).

== Leadership ==
In 2013, the company named Camelle Kent-Rizkalla as its CEO. She was replaced in 2021 by Reed Howlett.

== Manufacturing ==
Wellness Pet Company has three factories: two in the U.S. (Arkansas and Minnesota) and one in the Netherlands.

The company maintains the Farm Fresh Farm Kitchen manufacturing facility in Minnesota and a manufacturing plant in Indiana. The Indiana facility received a AA grade certification from the British Retail Consortium in late-2021, and the Minnesota facility received an A grade earlier in 2021. Its Whimzees brand is produced at its manufacturing campus in Veendam, The Netherlands, which also received a AA rating.

In recent years, the company has invested in increasing its sustainability in both its products and packaging. In June 2022, WellnessPet Company joined the fresh petfood market as it introduced its new product line, Wellness® Bowl Boosters Freshly™, an expansion of Wellness Pet Company's Bowl Boosters products. This product line was developed to meet the needs of pet-owners who are interested in providing their pets with versatile and fresh food.

In January 2023, Wellness Pet Company introduced its new and first line of pet supplements, recommended by nine out of ten veterinarians, to address specific health issues among dogs. Overall, the supplements seek to support dogs' health and wellbeing. These supplements are composed of 'high quality ingredients' and diverse 'tasty flavors'. Wellness pet supplements offer five scientifically formulated options that promote healthy digestion, healthy immune system and seasonal allergies, healthy skin and coat, calmness as well as composure. Also, these options aim at supporting healthy joint and hip function. Later in April 2023, Wellness Pet Company showed its devotion to sustainability as it became a member of the Pet Sustainability Coalition (PSC).
