= Barry Fromm =

American businessman (1950-2018)

Barry H. Fromm (May 27, 1950 - October 25, 2018) was the Chairman of three major firms, Value Recovery Group LLC (VRG), Ohio Railcar Group, LLC, and Value Recovery Holding, LLC. His firms perform a number of consulting and collection services including international banking, debt workout, management of distressed asset portfolios, recreation, debt collections and site development. His firm serve as the prime contractor for the Department of Energy’s Loan Programs Office (LPO) support services contract.

== Business Partnerships ==
In the 1980s he was a contractor for the Federal Savings and Loan Insurance Corporation (FSLIC); the firm’s task was to perform loan workout and collections related to the failed savings and loan associations. Soon, his collection contracts included both Resolution Trust Corporation (RTC) and Federal Deposit Insurance Corporation, FDIC. Fromm is an attorney with about 35 years experience; he has a law firm named “Fromm Law”.

VRG also processed and collected on all export insurance and loan guarantee claims (of $20 million or less) for the Export-Import Bank of the United States. In addition, in 2014 his firms are currently performing consulting tasks for the USA Department of Energy $40b energy loan program as well as a US Army energy contract.

In 2009 Fromm founded US Railcar, which purchased the assets of Colorado Railcar Manufacturing; he now serves as Chairman of US Railcar, which makes a DMU, “Diesel Multiple Unit” or railmotor, where the first car is a diesel-powered passenger car with the option to pull additional passenger cars.

In addition, his firms serve as the prime contractor for the Department of Energy’s Loan Programs Office (LPO) support services contract. Under this contract Value Recovery Holding supports all of the offices in the LPO with the exception of legal. VRH currently manages approximately 150 contractors, which equates to approximately 70 FTEs. To date, there have been 32 Task orders issued under this contract.

VRG’s sister company, Global Recovery Group, LLC processed and collected on all export insurance and loan guarantee claims (of $20 million or less) for the Export-Import Bank of the United States and the Overseas Private Investment Corporation (“OPIC”) for loans/claims under $10 million and has collected over $200 million the past eight years. GRG also managed approximately 150 litigation cases on behalf of Ex-Im Bank through local counsel in dozens of countries.

In 2014 the U. S. Army selected a team led by Value Recovery Holding (VRH) to provide a broad range of management, policy and technical resources designed to support the Army's Office of Energy Initiatives mission and to ensure effective implementation of large-scale, third-party financed energy projects that achieve Army-wide energy goals of deploying 1 gigawatt (GW) of renewable energy projects by 2025.

Fromm wasa partner in a firm that owned the former US Presidential Yacht, the U.S.S. Sequoia.

== Development ==
Fromm founded the Gahanna, Ohio, Golf Depot in 2009 as a project to reclaim a former landfill and provide golf recreation in the Columbus, Ohio area. This project to improve the livability and viability of the reclamation area now includes a hotel, a restaurant, golfing, golf driving range, short-distance golf and golf education facilities.

== Politics ==
In 2012, it was reported that he had donated money to Ted Strickland's re-election campaign.

In 2014 the website www.Campaignmoney.com noted that in 2012 that he gave to nine groups, including both Democrats and Republicans.
