= Marott Hotel =

- U.S. National Register of Historic Places
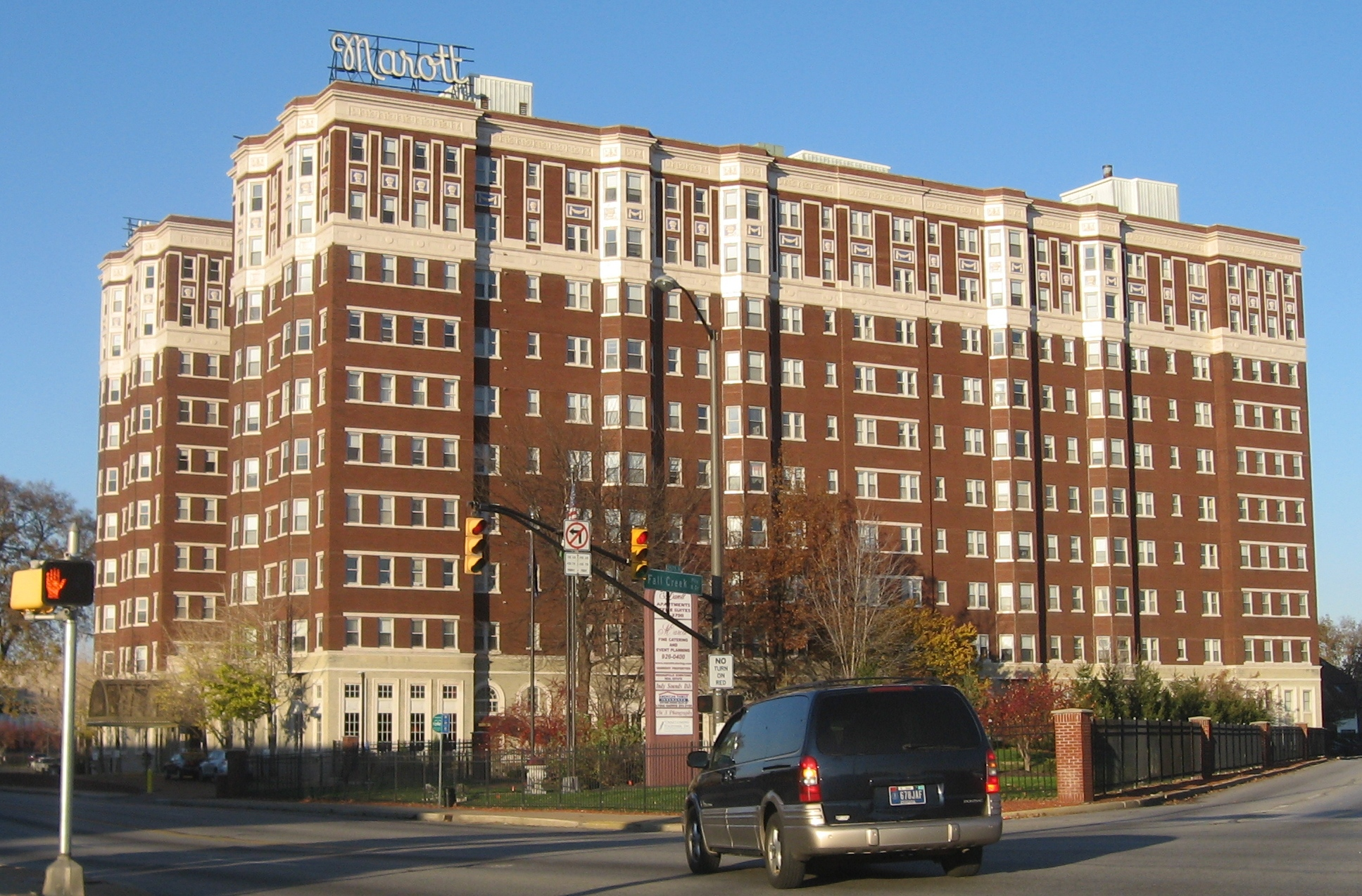
- Marott Hotel, November 2010

- Location within Indianapolis Location within Indiana Location within the United States
- Location: 2625 N. Meridian St., Indianapolis, Indiana
- Coordinates: 39°48′17″N 86°9′21″W
- Area: 3 acres (1.2 ha)
- Built: 1926
- Built by: Spink, E. G.
- Architect: Elridge, W. K.
- Architectural style: Colonial Revival, Chicago, Georgian Revival
- NRHP reference No.: 82000063
- Added to NRHP: June 25, 1982

Marott Hotel is a historic residential hotel building located at Indianapolis, Indiana. It was built in 1926, and consists of two 11-story, reinforced concrete structures faced in red brick with ornamental terra cotta and glazed tile trim in the Georgian Revival style. The two towers are connected by a one-story structure that contained the lobby, event halls, gym, and indoor pool.

It was listed on the National Register of Historic Places in 1982.

== See also ==
- National Register of Historic Places listings in Center Township, Marion County, Indiana
