= Kahn Tailoring Company Building =

- Kahn Tailoring Company
- U.S. National Register of Historic Places
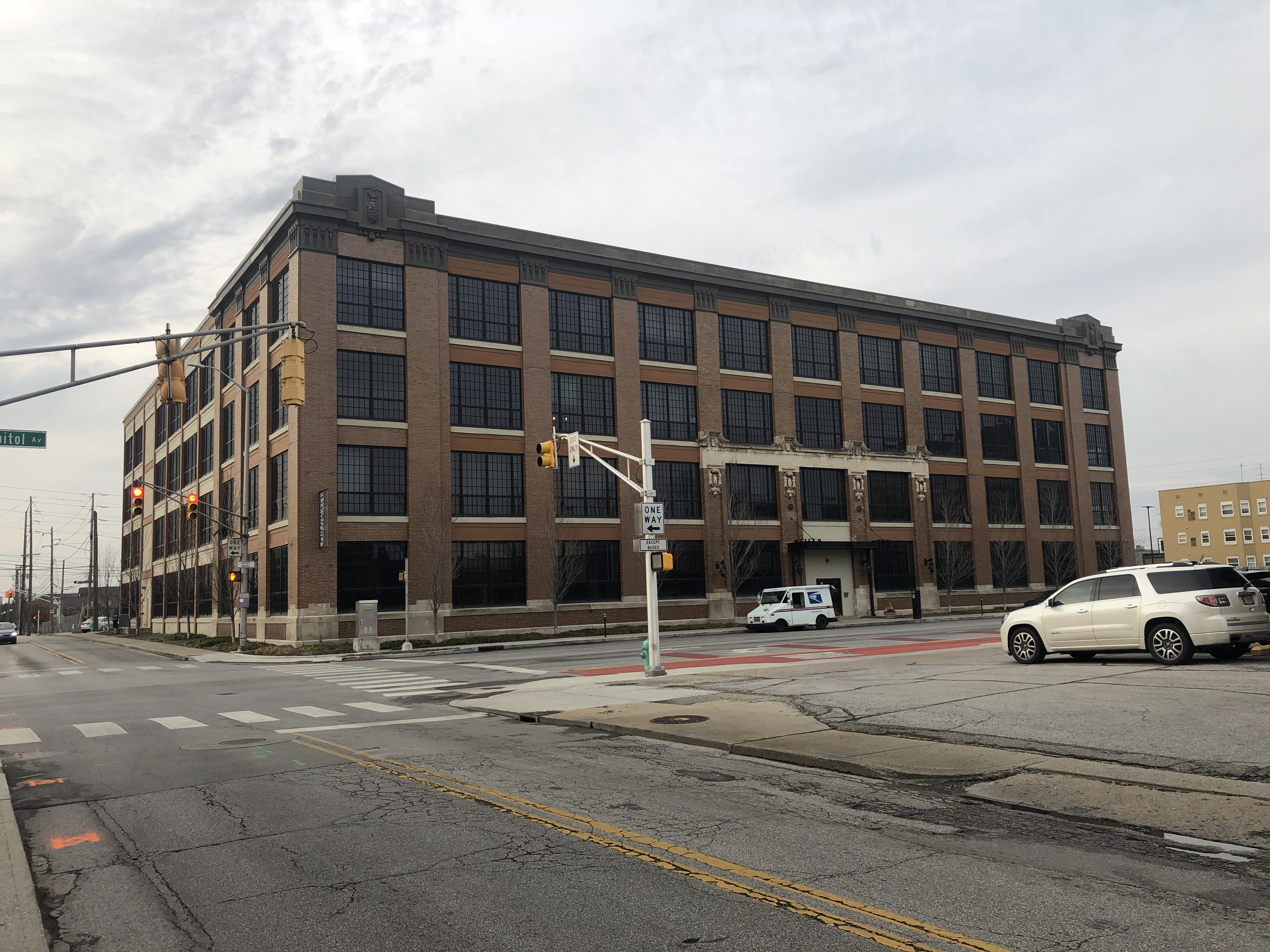
- Kahn Tailoring Company Building

- Location within Indianapolis Location within Indianapolis Location within Indiana Location within the United States
- Location: 800 N. Capitol Ave., Indianapolis, Indiana
- Coordinates: 39°46′42″N 86°09′40″W
- Area: 1.43 acres (0.58 ha)
- Built: 1913
- Architect: Vonnegut & Bohn
- Architectural style: Neoclassical
- Restored: 2014
- NRHP reference No.: 100004717
- Added to NRHP: November 29, 2019

The Kahn Tailoring Company building is a historic structure located in downtown Indianapolis, Indiana. It was designed by Indianapolis architects Vonnegut & Bohn and built in 1913. The building is a four-story Neoclassical style structure with reinforced concrete behind a brick veneer. The front entrance features a cornice with decorative features.

This building served as the manufacturing headquarters for the Kahn Tailoring Company, started by Henry Kahn in 1903. In addition to the manufacturing building, Kahn operated a retail store at 7 North Meridian Street in Indianapolis. Kahn was known for their high-end, custom suits for men and women. It was also an important manufacturer of military uniforms for the United States during World War I and World War II.

In 1954, Kahn Tailoring Company merged with the Globe Tailoring Company of Cincinnati, Ohio, and moved its manufacturing operations to Globe's facilities. The building was sold to a local printing company, who occupied it until at least the late-1990s. The building fell into disrepair before being converted into apartments in 2014.

The building was listed on the National Register of Historic Places in 2019.

== See also ==
- National Register of Historic Places listings in Center Township, Marion County, Indiana
