= Bulldog Park =

Baseball stadium in Indianapolis, Indiana, US

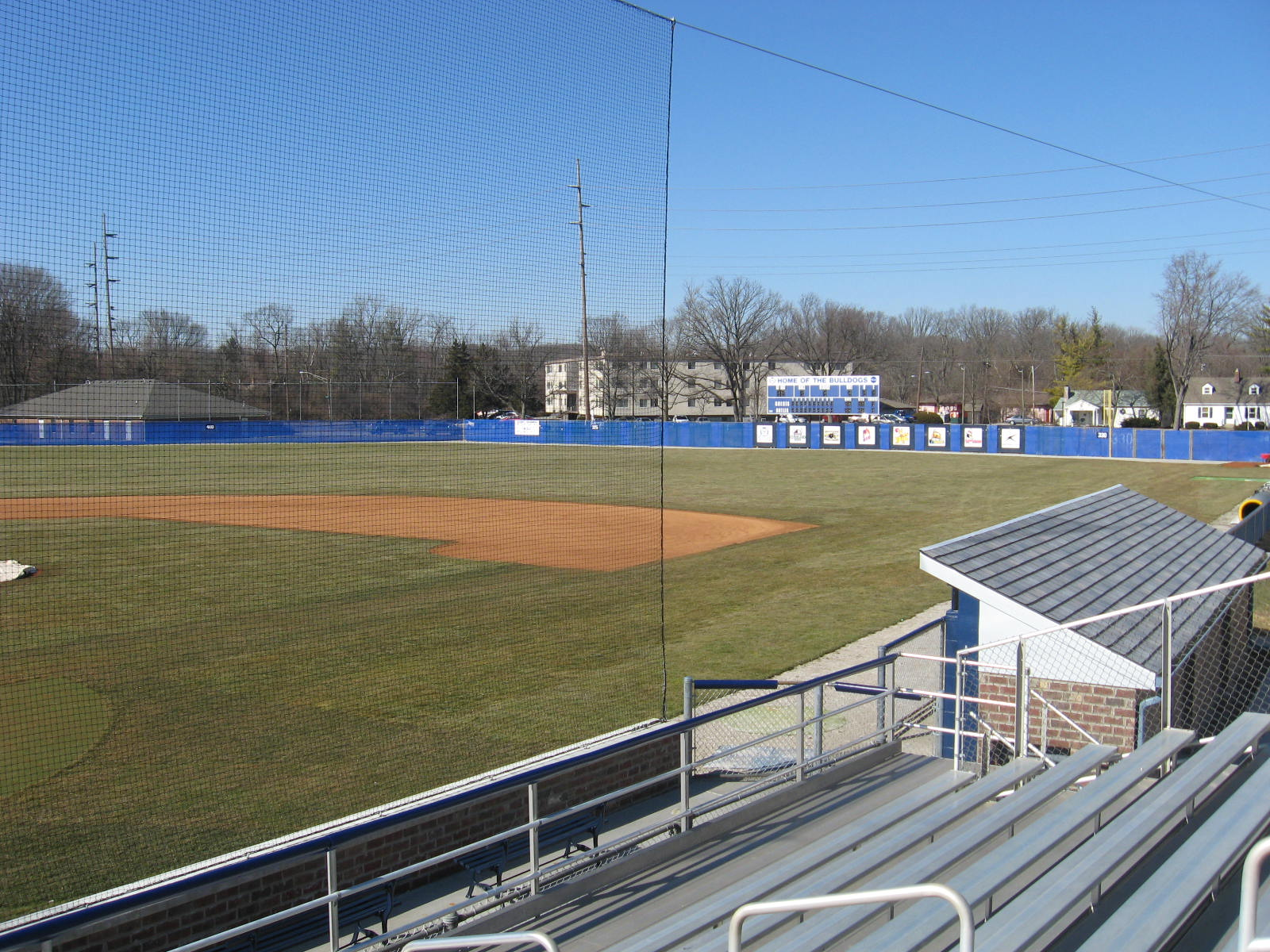
- Bulldog Park
- Interactive map of Bulldog Park
- Full name: Bulldog Park
- Address: 451 West 52nd Street
- Location: Indianapolis, Indiana
- Coordinates: 39.845815°N 86.167680°W
- Capacity: 500
- Type: Stadium
- Event: Baseball
- Surface: Grass
- Field size: Left field line – 330 ft (101 m); Left center – 370 ft (113 m); Center field – 400 ft (122 m); Right center – 370 ft (113 m); Right field line – 330 ft (101 m)

Construction
- Opened: 1991

Tenant
- Butler Bulldogs baseball (1991–Present)

Bulldog Park is a baseball stadium in Indianapolis, Indiana. It hosts the Butler University Bulldogs college baseball team. The stadium holds 500 people.

== History ==
Originally designed as a multi-use facility for both the football and baseball teams, it was converted into a baseball-only facility during the mid-90s. Several basic renovations have occurred during the facilities existence, including but not limited to: the installation of a permanent outfield fence, bleachers, dugouts and a press box. Major upgrades to the facility in 2011 include, but are not limited to: a brick wall behind home plate, professional-style netting behind home plate and a backstop to replace the chain-link fence. Also, ground-level bench seating and walk-in dugouts were added to the facility.

== Features ==
The facility has a clubhouse and locker room, concrete patio, engraved donor walk area, concessions and restrooms.

== See also ==
- Butler Bulldogs baseball
