= Butler Bulldogs baseball =

NCAA Division I college baseball team of Butler University

Butler Bulldogs
- 2026 Butler Bulldogs baseball team
- Founded: 1901
- University: Butler University
- Head coach: Blake Beemer (4th season)
- Conference: Big East
- Location: Indianapolis, Indiana
- Home stadium: Bulldog Park (Capacity: 500)
- Nickname: Bulldogs
- Colors: Blue and white

NCAA tournament appearances
- 2000

Conference tournament champions
- Midwestern Collegiate Conference; 1998, 2000

Conference regular season champions
- Indiana Collegiate Conference; 1969, 1974 Heartland Collegiate Conference; 1979, 1980 Midwestern Collegiate Conference; 1996, 1998, 1999

The Butler Bulldogs baseball team represents Butler University in NCAA Division I college baseball. The Bulldogs play their home games at Bulldog Park.

== History ==
The Bulldogs first fielded a varsity baseball team in 1901. They began competition in the Big East Conference in 2014, as they left the Atlantic 10 Conference following the 2013 season. Before 2013, Butler competed in the Horizon League and the MCC.

== NCAA Tournament ==
Butler has participated in the NCAA Division I baseball tournament once.

Year	Region	Round	Opponent	Result
2000	Palo Alto Super Regional	First Round; Lower Round 1	Nebraska; Wichita State	L 1–2; L 5–15

== Notable alumni ==
- Oral Hildebrand - Major League player, 1931–1940
- Dan Johnson - Major League player, 2005–2015
- Pat Neshek - Major League player, 2006–2019

=== Head coaches ===
Coach	Years	Record	Win Pct.
Walter F. Kelly	1901–1908	7–21–1	.259
Jack McKay	1909	1–6–0	.143
G. Cullen Thomas	1910–1919	10–23–1	.309
Tony Hinkle	1921–1927, 1933–1941, 1947–1971	323–303–3	.516
George Clark	1928	9–4–1	.679
Willie McGill	1929, 1932	13–9–1	.587
Hugh Middlesworth	1942	9–10–0	.474
Walter Floyd	1943	3–3–0	.500
Frank "Pop" Hedden	1945	6–7–0	.462
Thomas M. Warner	1972–1974	58–64–0	.475
Scott Neat	1975–1991	278–384–3	.421
Steve Farley	1991–2016	588–754–2	.438
Dave Schrage	2017–2022	133–130–1	.506
Blake Beemer	2023–present	32–78	.291

Source: Butler Baseball Record Book

== See also ==
- List of NCAA Division I baseball programs
