= G. Cullen Thomas =

American athlete and coach (1890–1973)

Biographical details
- Born: August 21, 1890; Parke County, Indiana, U.S.
- Died: January 11, 1973 (aged 82); Minneapolis, Minnesota, U.S.

Playing career

Football
- 1909–1911: Butler

Coaching career (HC unless noted)

Football
- 1912–1918: Butler

Basketball
- 1912–1913: Butler

Baseball
- 1910–1919: Butler

Head coaching record
- Overall: 20–24–2 (football); 16–18 (basketball); 10–23–1 (baseball)

George Cullen Thomas (August 21, 1890 – January 11, 1973) was an American college football, college basketball, and college baseball player and coach. He served as the head baseball coach at Butler University in Indianapolis from 1910 to 1919. He was also Butler's head football coach from 1912 to 1918 and head basketball coach during the 1912–13 season. Thomas was a charter member of Butler's Athletics Hall of Fame. Thomas also participated in track and field at Butler.

Thomas died on January 11, 1973, at Eitel Hospital in Minneapolis, Minnesota.

== Head coaching record ==
=== Football ===
Year	Team	Overall	Conference	Standing	Bowl/playoffs
Butler Christians (Independent) (1912–1915)
1912	Butler	5–3			
1913	Butler	2–4–1			
1914	Butler	4–2			
1915	Butler	1–6			
Butler Christians (Indiana College Athletic League) (1916–1917)
1916	Butler	3–5			
1917	Butler	3–3			
Butler Christians (Independent) (1918)
1918	Butler	2–1–1			
Butler:		20–24–2			
Total:		20–24–2			
