= Gayle Thornbrough =

American historian (1914–1999)

- Born: October 29, 1914; Hendricks County, Indiana
- Died: November 8, 1999 (aged 85)
- Citizenship: United States
- Education: Butler University; University of Michigan
- Occupations: historian, administrator
- Years active: 1937–1984
- Employer(s): Indiana Historical Society; Library of Congress
- Parent(s): Harry C. Thornbrough and Bess Tyler (his wife)
- Relatives: Emma Lou Thornbrough (sister)

Gayle Thornbrough (October 29, 1914 – November 8, 1999) was born in Hendricks County, Indiana, and grew up in Indianapolis. She joined the Indiana Historical Society in 1937 and served as its director of publications and library, an editor of historical documents, and its first executive secretary until her retirement in 1984. In addition to her work at the IHS, Thornbrough was involved in historical editing projects for the Indiana Historical Bureau from 1947 to 1966 and spent twenty months in 1967–1968 as a manuscript specialist at the Library of Congress in Washington, D.C. Thornbrough is best known for her contributions to editing historical documents. She is named as the editor of nearly twenty publications, the most notable include The Old Northwest: Pioneer Period, 1815–1840, a Pulitzer Prize winner by R. Carlyle Buley; Journals of the General Assembly of Indiana Territory, 1805–1815; Indiana Election Returns, 1816–1851; three volumes in the governors of Indiana series (James B. Ray, Noah Noble, and Samuel Bigger); and The Diary of Calvin Fletcher, among others. The Indiana Magazine of History's annual Thornbrough award and Indiana Association of Historians' annual fall lecture are named in honor of Thornbrough and her sister, Emma Lou.

== Early life and education ==
Born in Hendricks County, Indiana, on October 29, 1914, Gayle was the second child of Harry C. Thornbrough, an engineer, and Bess Tyler, his wife. Gayle grew up in Indianapolis, where she graduated from Shortridge High School in 1932. She received an undergraduate degree from Butler University in 1937 and a master's degree from the University of Michigan in 1942.

Thornbrough enjoyed the theater, music, and classical and modern literature. She also traveled extensively with her older sister, Emma Lou, who was an Indiana historian, author and professor of history at Butler University. The sisters shared their childhood home throughout their lives.

== Career ==
Thornbrough began her career as an editor in 1937, when she joined the Indiana Historical Society as its first full-time employee. Thornbrough became nationally recognized for her work in editing historical documents. She is listed as editor for nearly twenty publications, but also prepared more than fifty more for publication. Thornbrough was involved in historical editing projects for the Indiana Historical Bureau from 1947 to 1966 in addition to her work at the IHS.

Early editing assignments for the IHS included Prehistory Research Series, "the earliest scholarly publication on Indiana archaeology," and as copyeditor for R. Carlyle Buley's book, The Old Northwest: Pioneer Period, 1815–1840 (Indianapolis: Indiana Historical Society, 1950), a two-volume work that won a Pulitzer Prize. Thornbrough's editing projects, either alone or with fellow historian Dorothy Riker, resulted in the publication of several scholarly research tools that included Journals of the General Assembly of Indiana Territory, 1805–1815 (Indianapolis: Indiana Historical Bureau, 1950), Indiana Election Returns, 1816–1851 (Indianapolis: Indiana Historical Bureau, 1960), and three volumes in the governors of Indiana series (James B. Ray, Noah Noble, and Samuel Bigger). After Indiana archaeologist Glenn Albert Black died in 1964, leaving behind an uncompleted manuscript of his work at Angel Mounds, Thornbrough commissioned others to finish Angel Site: An Archaeological, Historical, and Ethnological Study (Indianapolis: Indiana Historical Society, 1967) and edited the final manuscript to assure continuity of style. When the set of illustrations was stolen while they were in the printer's possession, Thornbrough secured replacements for 420 photographs and determined their placement in the book.

Thornbrough left the IHS staff in 1967, when she went to work for the Library of Congress in Washington, D.C. She spent twenty months as a specialist in early U.S. history in its Manuscript Division. During Thornbrough's absence from Indianapolis, the IHS reorganized to establish a leadership role for her. She returned to Indiana in 1968 and began an eight-year tenure as the IHS's director of publications and library. One of Thornbrough's major editing projects was leading a project team to publish The Diary of Calvin Fletcher (Indianapolis: Indiana Historical Society, 1972–1983). Fletcher, a prominent Indianapolis resident, began his diary in 1820 and continued the effort with some periodic gaps for nearly twenty years. Reviewers commended the nine-volume work for its editing.

Thornbrough was appointed the IHS's first executive secretary in 1976, following its reorganization as a separate entity from the Bureau, a state-supported historical agency. As an administrator and editor for the IHS, Thornbrough encouraged major historical research projects, funded a history of medicine position at Indiana University, released the album Indiana Ragtime (Indianapolis: Indiana Historical Society, 1981), and supported the publication of the IHS's black history newsletter and its collection program in African American history. Thornbrough also encouraged efforts to microfilm Indiana newspapers. She retired from the IHS in September 1984.

== Death and legacy ==
Thornbrough died on November 8, 1999. A memorial tribute appearing in the Indiana Magazine of History in 2000 described her as "one of the most productive and influential historians in the history of the state."

== Honors and awards ==
Thornbrough was awarded an honorary doctorate from Indiana University in 1982.

The Indiana Magazine of History's annual Thornbrough award, a tribute to Gayle, her sister, Emma Lou, and their contributions to the historical profession, recognizes the best article to appear in its pages. The Indiana Association of Historians' annual fall lecture was renamed to honor the Thornbrough sisters.

== Selected works ==
- The Buffalo Trace by George R. Wilson and Gayle Thornbrough (Indianapolis: Indiana Historical Society, 1963), Indiana Historical Society Publications, Volume XV, Number 2

=== Documentary editing projects ===
- The Correspondence of John Badollet and Albert Gallatin, 1804–1836 (Indianapolis: Indiana Historical Society, 1963), Indiana Historical Society Publications, Volume 22
- The Diary of Calvin Fletcher (Indianapolis: Indiana Historical Society, 1972–1983), 9 volumes
- A Friendly Mission: John Candler’s Letters from America, 1853–1854 (Indianapolis: Indiana Historical Society, 1951), Indiana Historical Society Publications, Volume XVI, Number 1
- Governor James Brown Ray: Messages and Papers, 1825–1831 (Indianapolis: Indiana Historical Bureau, 1954), Indiana Historical Collections, Volume XXXIV
- Indiana Election Returns, 1816–1851 (Indianapolis: Indiana Historical Bureau, 1960), Indiana Historical Collections, Volume XL
- Journals of the General Assembly of Indiana Territory, 1805–1815 (Indianapolis: Indiana Historical Bureau, 1950), Indiana Historical Collections, Volume XXXII
- Letter Book of the Indiana Agency at Fort Wayne, 1809–1815 (Indianapolis: Indiana Historical Society, 1961), Indiana Historical Society Publications, Volume 21
- Messages and Paper relating to the Administration of Noah Noble, Governor or Indiana, 1831–1837 (Indianapolis: Indiana Historical Bureau, 1958) Indiana Historical Collections, Volume XXXVIII
- Messages and Paper relating to the Administration of Samuel Bigger, Governor or Indiana, 1840–1843 (Indianapolis: Indiana Historical Bureau, 1964) Indiana Historical Collections, Volume XLIV
- Outpost on the Wabash, 1787–1791; Letters of Brigadier General Josiah Harmar and Major John Francis Hamtramck, and other letters and documents selected from the Harmar papers in the William L. Clements Library (Indianapolis: Indiana Historical Society, 1957), Indiana Historical Society Publications, Volume 19
