= Emma Lou Thornbrough =

American historian (1913–1994)

- Born: January 24, 1913; Indianapolis, Indiana, United States
- Died: December 19, 1994 (aged 81)
- Citizenship: United States
- Education: Butler University and University of Michigan
- Occupations: Historian, author, and university professor
- Employer: Butler University
- Notable work: The Negro in Indiana before 1900 and Indiana in the Civil War Era, 1850–1880
- Parent(s): Harry C. Thornbrough and Bess Tyler (his wife)
- Relatives: Gayle Thornbrough (sister)

Emma Lou Thornbrough (January 24, 1913 – December 19, 1994) was an author, historian in African American and Indiana history, a civil rights activist, and professor of history at Butler University. She was born in Indianapolis, Indiana. Thornbrough's major scholarly contributions include several publications devoted to black history, such as The Negro in Indiana before 1900; Booker T. Washington; T. Thomas Fortune, Militant Journalist; Since Emancipation: A Short History of Indiana Negroes, 1863–1963; and Indiana Blacks in the Twentieth Century (published posthumously in 2000). She also wrote Indiana in the Civil War Era, 1850–1880, among other scholarly publications. In addition to her writing and research, Thornbrough was well known as a social activist and was especially active in Indianapolis civil rights groups, including the Indianapolis Human Relations Council, which she helped organize; the Indiana Civil Liberties Union; and the Indianapolis National Association for the Advancement of Colored People.

== Early life and education ==
Born in Indianapolis, Indiana, on January 24, 1913, Emma Lou was the first child of Harry C. Thornbrough, who was an inventor, and his wife, Bess Tyler. Emma Lou became an avid gardener, traveled extensively with her younger sister, Gayle, in Europe, and enjoyed the London theater, classical music, and literature. The sisters also shared their childhood home throughout their lives.

Thornbrough attended Indianapolis's Shortridge High School. She received and undergraduate degree in 1934 and a master's degree in 1936 from Butler University and began a career teaching history at Indianapolis's George Washington High School. Thornbrough earned a doctorate in history from the University of Michigan in 1946 before returning to Indianapolis to teach at Butler.

Thornbrough's interest in black history grew out of Dwight Lowell Dumond's graduate seminar, which she attended while studying for a doctorate degree at Ann Arbor, Michigan. Dumond was a revisionist historian in interpreting the role of abolitionism and the causes of the American Civil War. Thornbrough's dissertation was titled Negro Slavery in the North: Its Legal and Constitutional Aspects.

== Career ==
Thornbrough, a lifelong educator, became a professor of history at Butler University in 1946 and remained on its faculty until her retirement in 1983. A Ford Foundation fellowship enabled Thornbrough to temporarily reside in New York and Washington, D.C., in 1955 and 1956 to conduct research on Timothy Thomas Fortune, the subject of one of her books. In addition, she was a visiting professor at Indiana University and at Case-Western Reserve University.

Thornbrough is best known as the author of many scholarly works, including monographs, essays, and articles for academic journals. In 1952 she ran unsuccessfully as a Democratic candidate for the Indiana General Assembly, but she remained active in civic affairs and was a civil-rights activist throughout her adult life.

=== Educator ===
Thornbrough began teaching at Butler University immediately after receiving her doctorate in history from the University of Michigan in 1946. Known as innovative and committed to liberal education, she was a popular educator among Butler students. Thornbrough taught courses on American constitutional history, history of the American South, and African American history, as well as courses on Greek and Roman civilizations. During her tenure at Butler she also introduced an interdisciplinary comparative course on world cultures. Thornbrough retired from Butler in 1983.

=== Author ===
Although Thornbrough wrote numerous scholarly articles and books, the majority of her work concentrated on Indiana history, with a specific focus on African Americans. She was known for her meticulous research and straightforward presentation. Indiana historian Richard B. Pierce, who met Thornbrough while he was a graduate student, explained that she "produced work that has a lasting merit" in an area of civil rights and race relations that was not popular among historians at the beginning of her career. Thornbrough's range of interests and expertise in topics that included civil rights, legal and legislative history, and political and social issues are evident in reviews of her published works.

Some historians have concluded that Thornbrough's reputation as a historian of Indiana rests principally on two books, The Negro in Indiana before 1900 (1957) and Indiana in the Civil War Era (1965). IU's Richard Blackett remarked that The Negro in Indiana "set the standard for examinations of the black experience in other northern states." A memorial tribute appearing in the Indiana Magazine of History in 1995 further explained that The Negro in Indiana was among "the first source consulted by those with questions relating to the 'middle period' of the state's nineteenth-century history." Ball State University's Robert LaFollette, who reviewed her book in 1958, described it as the "historical base for understanding the situation of the Negro in the twentieth century." The Indiana Historical Society commissioned Thornbrough to write Indiana in the Civil War Era, 1850–1880, another of her major works, as the third volume of a five-part series about the history of Indiana for the state sesquicentennial.

Thornbrough authored several notable biographies. Pioneering kindergarten educator Eliza Ann Cooper Blaker was the subject of her first publication, Eliza A. Blaker: Her Life and Work (1956). Thornbrough's biography of Booker T. Washington is part of publisher Prentice Hall's Great Lives Observed series, but T. Thomas Fortune, Militant Journalist may be considered her best work.

Thornbrough was interested in women's history, but other than her book on Blaker and an essay she contributed on the history of Indiana's black women, which appears in Indiana’s African-American Heritage (1993), her published scholarship was in other areas. Legal and constitutional history, as well as black history, were her major interests. Thornbrough's published works related to black history include Black Reconstructionists (1972), Since Emancipation: A Short History of Indiana Negroes, 1863–1963 ([1963?]), and topics such as the fugitive slave law in Indiana, the history of the civil rights movement in Indiana, and Indianapolis's school desegregation, among others.

At the time of Thornbrough's death in 1994, she had completed all but the last chapter of Indiana Blacks in the Twentieth Century, the sequel to The Negro in Indiana before 1900 (1965). Indiana Blacks in the Twentieth Century, with edits and a final chapter by Lana Ruegamer, was published posthumously in 2000.

Thornbrough's interest in civil rights also included research on the desegregation of Indianapolis's public schools. "The Indianapolis Story: School Segregation and Desegregation in a Northern City, 1993" provides a detailed account of the city's school policy regarding race and the school desegregation process, beginning with the school desegregation law in 1949 to 1971, when the Indianapolis Public Schools was found guilty in federal court of de jure segregation. Thornbrough donated the manuscript to the Indiana Historical Society in 1992. Although it remains unpublished as of 2016, the work is considered to be "a lasting testament to the length and breadth of her career."

== Community service ==
Emma Lou Thornbrough was active in many professional, academic, historical, and civil rights organizations, such as the Organization of American Historians, Southern Historical Association, American Association of University Professors, Indiana Association of Historians, Indiana Alpha Association of Phi Beta Kappa, Indiana Historical Society, and the Indianapolis Council of World Affairs. She served as an officer or board member for many of these groups, and was a past president of the Indiana Association of Historians.

Thornbrough participated in several national and local historical organizations. In the late 1950s she helped organize the Indianapolis Human Relations Council and chaired its education committee. In addition, Thornbrough served on the executive boards of the Indiana Civil Liberties Union and the Indianapolis NAACP. She was the recipient of several awards from civil-rights organizations for her service.

== Later years ==
Thornbrough continued to research and write after her retirement from Butler University in 1983. Two major manuscripts remained unpublished at the time of her death, Indiana Blacks in the Twentieth Century (published posthumously in 2000) and "The Indianapolis Study: School Segregation and Desegregation in a Northern City" (remains unpublished as of 2016).

== Death and legacy ==
Thornbrough died on December 16, 1994, leaving behind a lasting legacy of historical scholarship and community service. As one historian concluded, her scholarly research and publication "had a profound effect on many of us for she has shown the way and set a standard we must try to emulate."

== Honors and awards ==
While a professor at Butler University, Thornbrough received the Outstanding Professor Award in 1965. She was appointed to the McGregor Chair in History in 1981. the same year she received the Butler Medal, the university's highest honor. Butler awarded her an honorary doctorate in 1988.

The IAH annual fall lecture was renamed to honor Thornbrough and her sister, Gayle, a retired editor and former director of the Indiana Historical Society and the Indiana Historical Bureau. The Indiana Magazine of History's annual Thornbrough award recognizes the best article to appear in its magazine as a tribute to the two Thornbrough sisters and their contributions to the history profession.

Her numerous awards from the community include: Phi Beta Kappa, Indiana Author's Day recognition (1966), Martin Luther King award from the Indianapolis Education Association (1976), Indiana Liberty Bell from the Indiana State Bar Association (1987), Roy Wilkins award from the Indianapolis Urban League (1991), Fadely Award from the Marion County–Indianapolis Historical Society (1992), and the IHS's Hoosier Historian award (1992). In 1993 Thornbrough was a recipient of the American Historical Association's Scholarly Distinction Award.

== Selected works ==
=== Books ===
- Eliza A. Blaker, Her Life and Work (Indianapolis: Eliza A. Blaker Club and Indiana Historical Society, 1956).
- The Negro in Indiana [before 1900]: A Study of a Minority Indiana Historical Collections, Vol. XXXVII (Indianapolis: Indiana Historical Bureau, 1957) Reprinted, Bloomington: Indiana University Press, 1993.
- Since Emancipation: A Short History of Indiana Negroes, 1863–1963 ([Indianapolis]: American Negro Emancipation Centennial Authority, Indiana Division, [1963?].
- Indiana in the Civil War Era, 1850–1880 (Indianapolis: Indiana Historical Bureau and Indiana Historical Society, 1965)
- Booker T. Washington (Englewood Cliffs, N.J.: Prentice-Hall, 1969).
- Black Reconstructionists (Englewood Cliffs, N.J.: Prentice-Hall, 1972).
- T. Thomas Fortune, Militant Journalist (Chicago: University of Chicago Press, 1972).
- This Far by Faith: Black Hoosier Heritage (Indianapolis: Indiana Committee for the Humanities, 1982).
- The Greco-Roman World: The Greeks (Indianapolis: Butler University, 1985).
- The World of Christopher Columbus: Imperial Spain, 1469–1598 (Indianapolis: Butler University, 1985). Reprinted, Needham Heights, MA: Ginn Press, 1991.
- Indiana Blacks in the Twentieth Century (Bloomington: Indiana University Press, 2000). Edited and with a final chapter by Lana Ruegamer.

=== Chapters in books ===
- "The Indiana Scene in 1870," in Irvington Historical Society Collected Papers, 1967–1968 (Indianapolis: Irvington Historical Society History Committee, [1968?]), 50–65.
- "The Indianapolis School Busing Case," in We the People: Indiana and the United States Constitution (Indianapolis: Indiana Historical Society, 1987), 68–92.
- "The History of Black Women in Indiana" in Indiana’s African-American Heritage, ed. Wilma L. Gibbs (Indianapolis: Indiana Historical Society, 1993), 67–85.
- "African-Americans" overview essay in The Encyclopedia of Indianapolis, eds. David J. Bodenhamer and Robert G. Barrows (Bloomington: Indiana University Press, 1994), 5–14.

=== Articles ===
- "The Race Issue in Indiana Politics during the Civil War," Indiana Magazine of History, XLVII (June, 1951), 165–88.
- "Indiana and Fugitive Slave Legislation," Indiana Magazine of History, L (September, 1954), 201–28.
- "The Brownsville Episode and the Negro Vote," Mississippi Valley Historical Review, XLIV (December, 1957) 469–93
- "More Light on Booker T. Washington and the New York Age," Journal of Negro History, XLIII ([Winter?], 1958) 33–49.
- "The National Afro-American League, 1887–1908," Journal of Southern History, XXVII (November, 1961) 494–512.
- "Segregation in Indiana during the Klan Era of the 1920s," Mississippi Valley Historical Review, XLVII (March, 1961) 594–618.
- "Judge Perkins, the Indiana Supreme Court, and the Civil War," Indiana Magazine of History, LX (March, 1964) 79–96.
- "American Negro Newspapers, 1880–1914," Business History Review, XL (Winter, 1966) 467–90.
- "Origins of 'The American Dilemma' Revisited," Reviews in American History, VII (September, 1979) 325–30.
- "Breaking Racial Barriers to Public Accommodations in Indiana, 1935 to 1963," Indiana Magazine of History, LXXXIII (December, 1987) 301–43.
