= List of Butler University Buildings =

The following is a list of the buildings on the campus of Butler University in Indianapolis, Indiana, United States.

== Academic Buildings ==
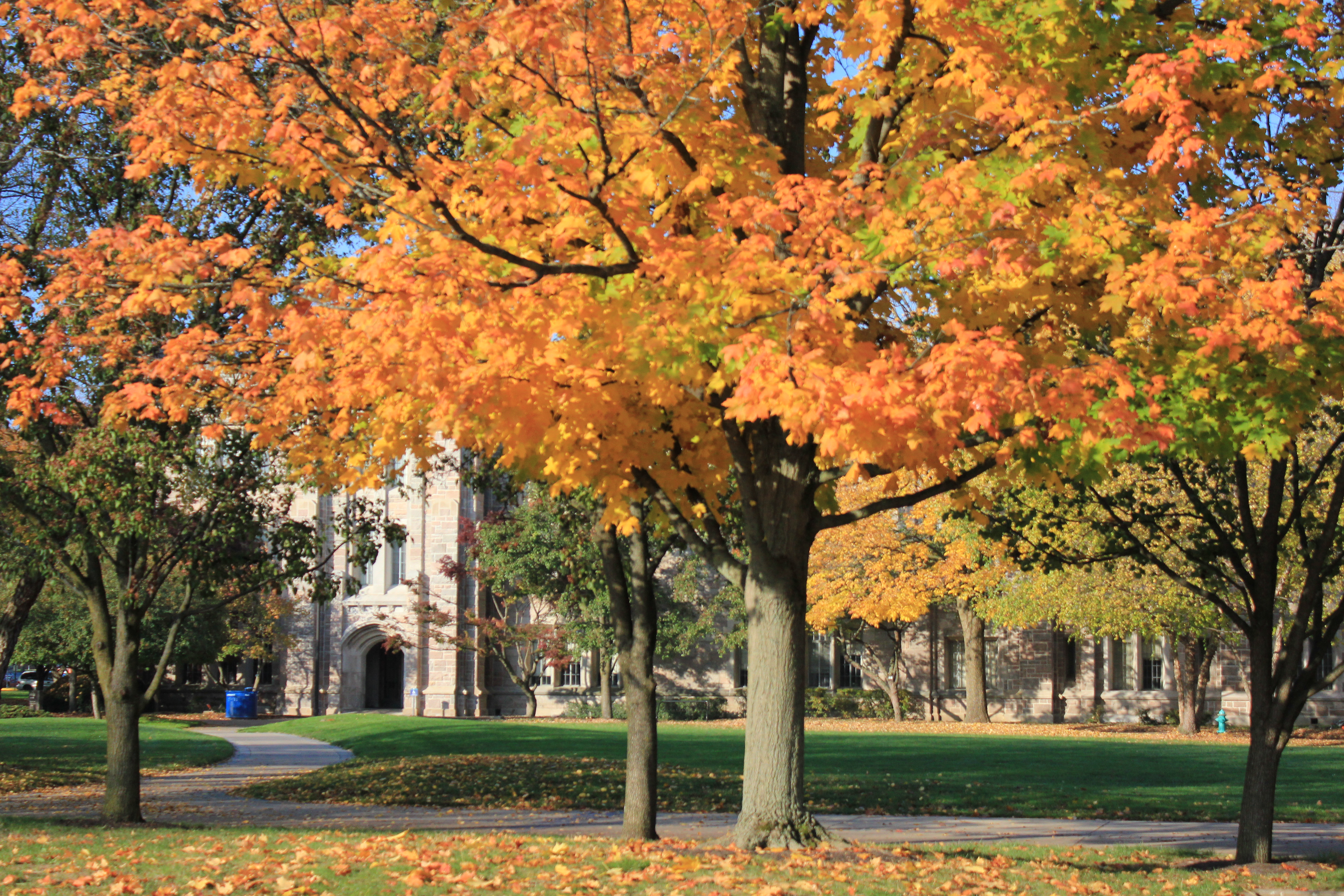
Jordan Hall

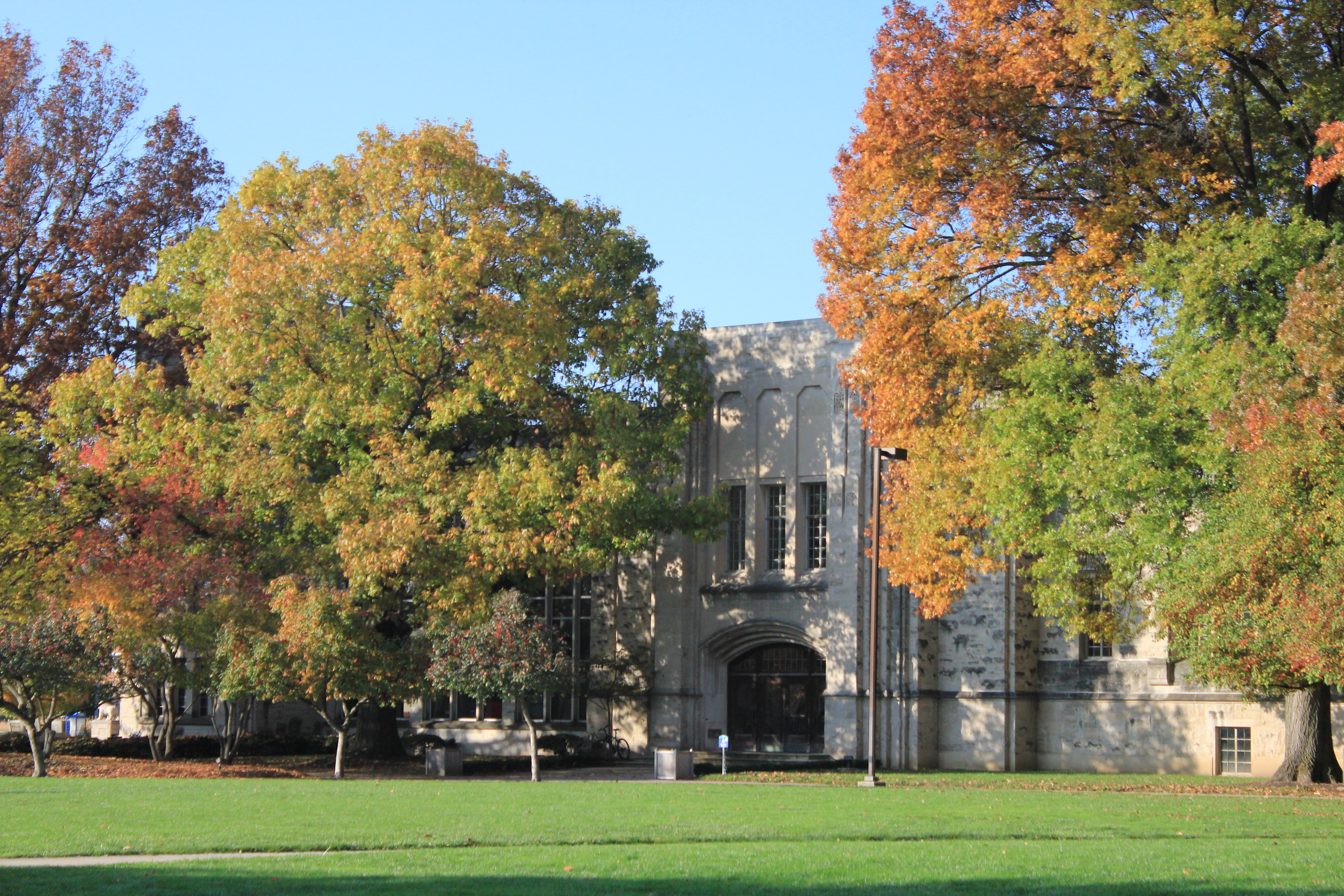
Atherton Union

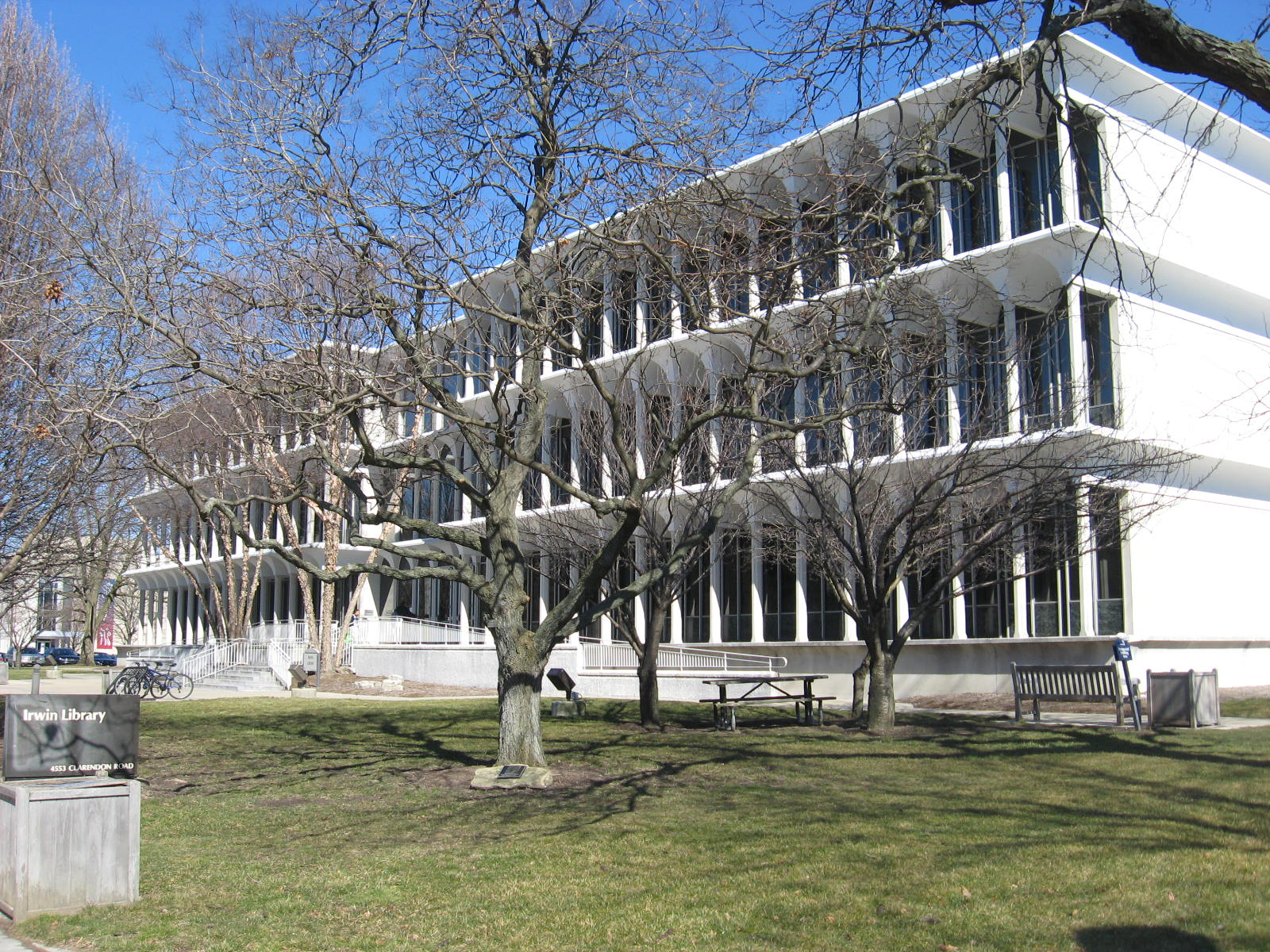
Irwin Library

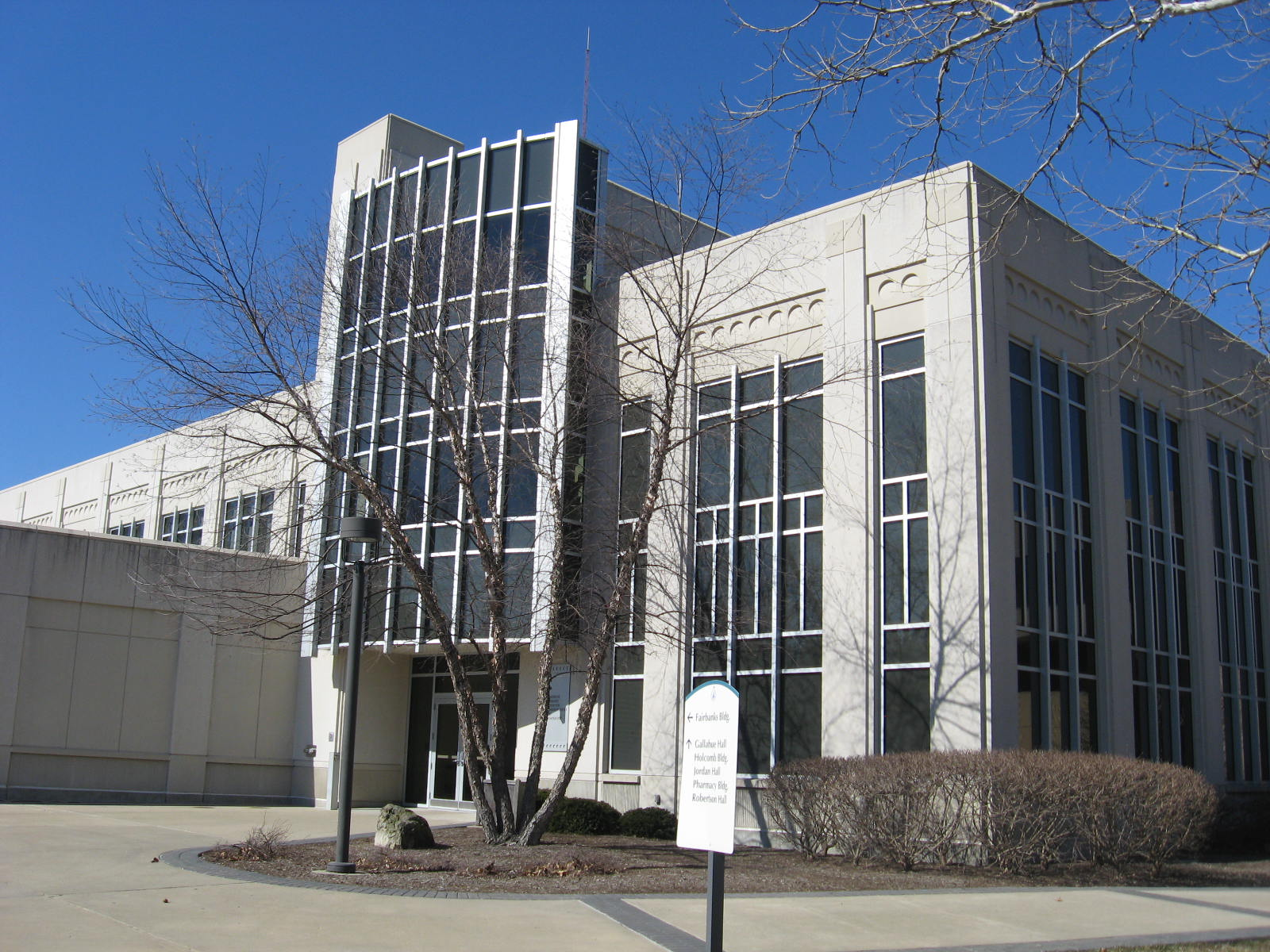
Fairbanks Center

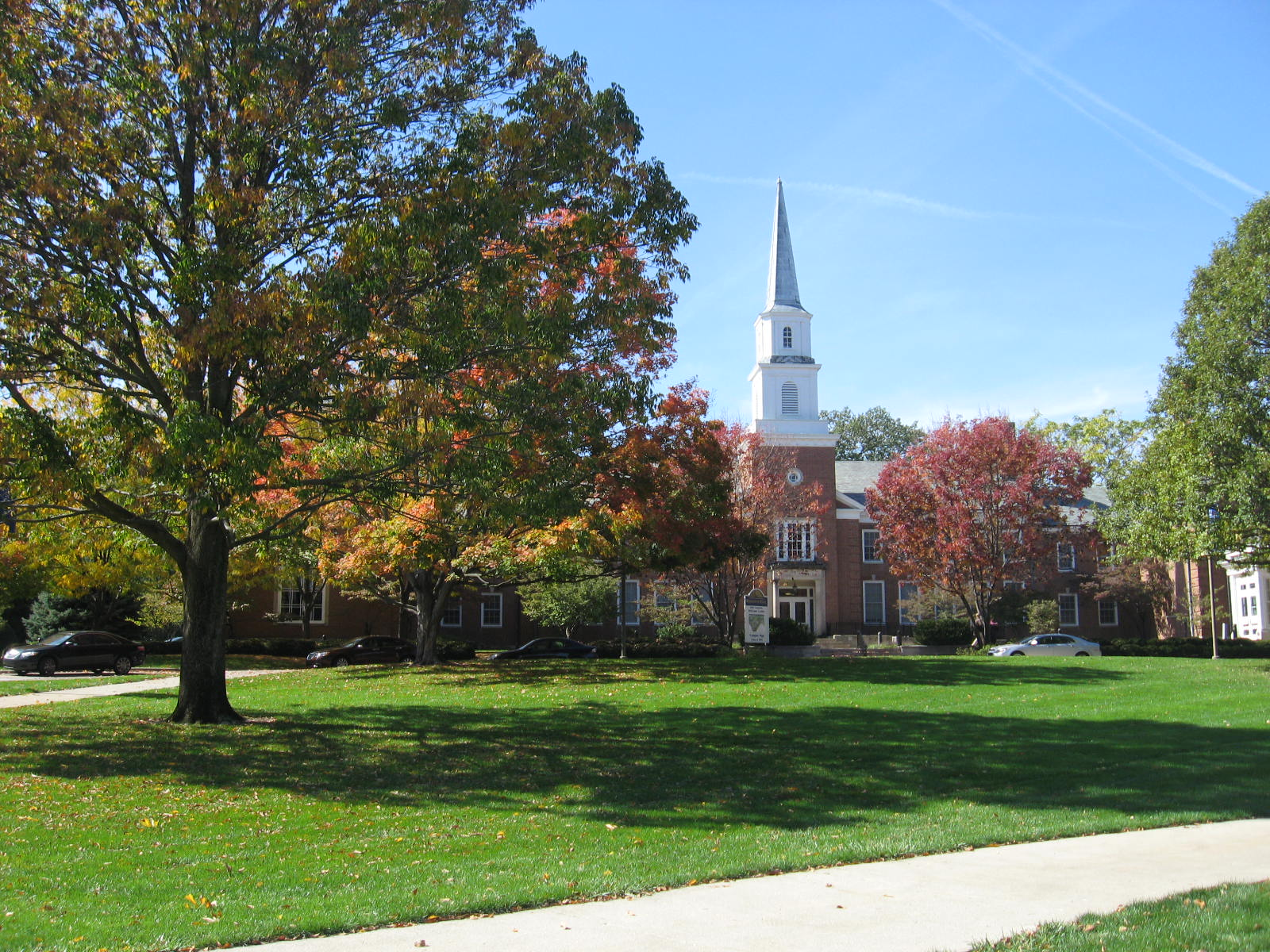
Robertson Hall

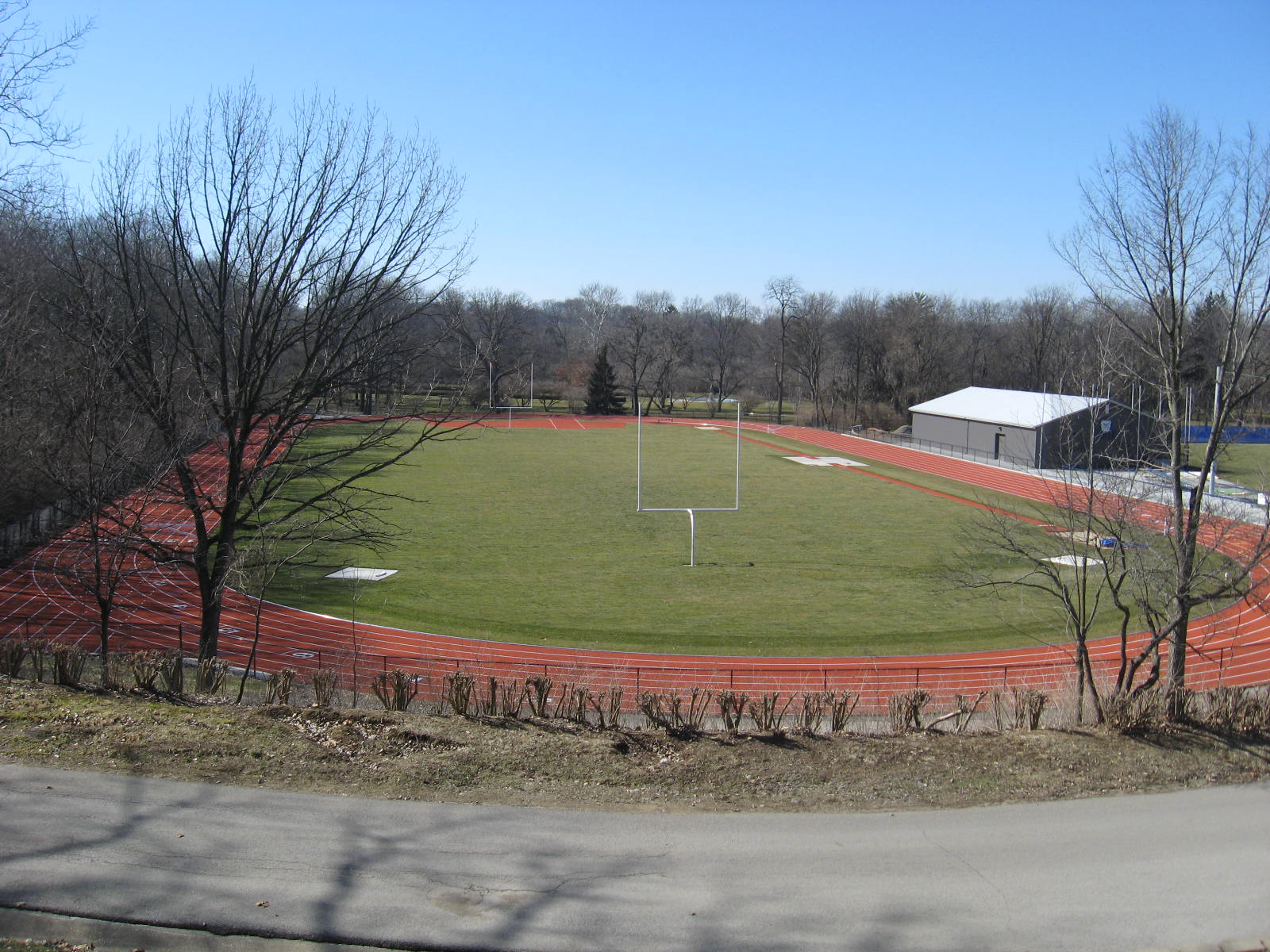
Davey Track and Field

- Arthur Jordan Memorial Hall-Known on campus as "Jordan Hall," built in honor of Arthur Jordan.
- Fairbanks Center-Named in honor of Richard M. Fairbanks; houses the College of Communication.
- Gallahue Hall-Named in honor of Edward and Dorothy Gallahue; houses all science classes.
- Holcomb Building-Named in honor of James Irving Holcomb. Houses college of Business and the Science Library.
- Irwin Library-Named in honor of the Irwin family, long-time contributors to the Butler Community.
- Lilly Hall-Named in honor of the Lilly family, houses the School of Music.
- Pharmacy and Health Sciences Building-Houses the College of Pharmacy.

== Administrative Buildings ==
- Atherton Union-Named in honor of John W. Atherton; houses numerous offices, as well as a dining court, and the bookstore.
- Butler University Police Department
- Robertson Hall-Built in honor of Alexander and Carrie Robinson, houses the Office of Admissions.

== Arts and Entertainment Buildings ==
- Eidson-Duckwall Recital Hall-Named in honor of Paul Duckwall and Iva Eidson Duckwall.
- Clowes Memorial Hall-Not owned by Butler University, but on the University property.

== Athletic Buildings ==
- Butler Bubble-4 indoor tennis courts.
- Health and Recreation Complex-Home to various recreational activities as well as the Health Offices.
- Hinkle Fieldhouse-Butler's most historic building, named in honor of legendary coach Paul "Tony" Hinkle. Designated a National Historic Landmark in 1987.
- Bulldog Park - Baseball facility used by the Butler Bulldogs baseball team

== Religious Buildings ==
- Center for Faith and Vocation

== Residence Halls ==
- Apartment Village
- Residential College
- Ross Residence Hall-Named in honor Maurice Ross, a former Butler President.
- Schwitzer Hall-Named in honor of Louis Schwitzer, a University Donor. Demolished in 2017.
- University Terrace
- Irvington House

== Fraternity Houses ==
- Delta Tau Delta
- Lambda Chi Alpha
- Phi Delta Theta
- Sigma Chi
- Sigma Nu
- Beta Theta Pi

== Sorority Houses ==
- Alpha Chi Omega
- Alpha Phi
- Delta Delta Delta
- Delta Gamma
- Kappa Alpha Theta
- Kappa Kappa Gamma
- Pi Beta Phi
