= John Barnhart =

John Barnhart may refer to:

- John Hendley Barnhart (1871–1949), American botanist and author
- John Barnhart, Canadian pioneer and merchant in Peel County, Ontario
- John Barnhart, American editor, Indiana Magazine of History 1941–1955
