= Irwin Library =

University Library of Butler University

Coordinates: 39.8382°N 86.1705°W

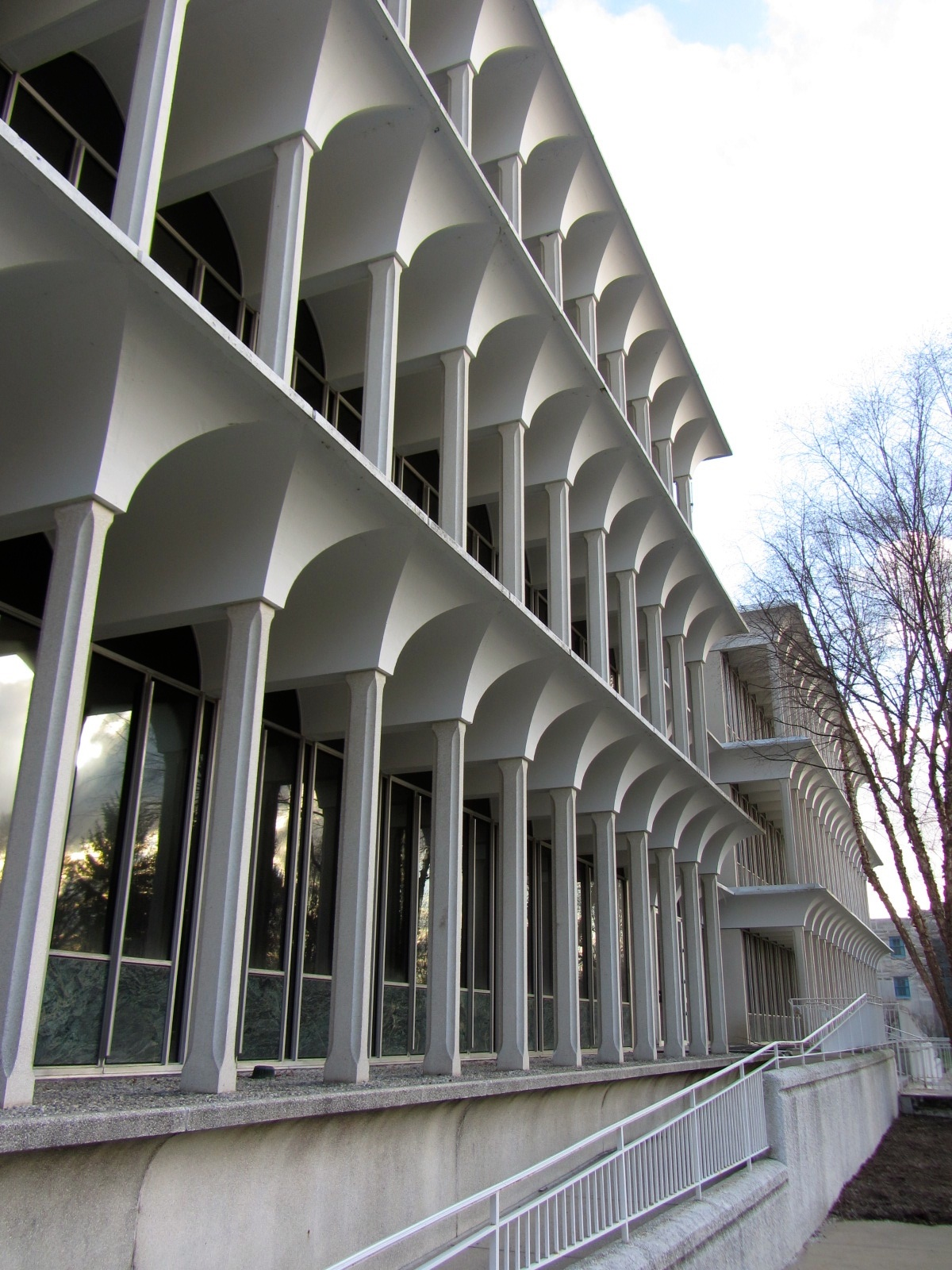
Irwin Library in 2012

Irwin Library is one of the three libraries operated by Butler University in Indianapolis. The building was designed by Minoru Yamasaki and opened in 1963. The library is named for a former university trustee and donor, William Glanton Irwin.

== History ==
Minoru Yamasaki was the lead architect, and constructed the library in the architectural style of New Formalism. Yamasaki was given the choice between designing the campus's fine arts facility or the library. He chose the library because he considered it the "cultural center" of the university. Construction of the library cost $2.25 million, of which $1.5 million was underwritten by the Irwin-Sweeney-Miller foundation. After construction was finished, the library's first day of operation was on September 9, 1963. Until the building was finished the university's library collections had been stored in the basement of Jordan Hall. Harold Boisen served as librarian when the collections moved from the basement to the building. When Boisen retired in 1967, he was followed by Richard A. Davis.

The structure includes arched columns, recessed windows, a skylight, and an indoor fountain.

The library was named in honor of William Glanton Irwin, who served as a trustee of Butler University from 1908 until his death in 1943. Irwin was the great uncle of a Joseph Irwin Miller whose foundation donated funds for the construction of the building.

In 2021, a six-person panel of American Institute of Architects (AIA) Indianapolis members identified Irwin Library among the ten most "architecturally significant" buildings completed in the city since World War II.

== Services ==
Irwin Library is one of the three parts of the Butler University Libraries. It consists of the business, education, curriculum, and liberal arts resources as well as the performing and fine arts collections. Butler University's second library, the Ruth Lilly Science Library, contains resources for Biological Sciences, Chemistry, Computer Science, Engineering, Mathematics and Actuarial Science, Pharmacy and Health Sciences, and Physics. Butler University's third library, the Education Resource Library, serves the College of Education by providing access to children's, young adult, curricular, and professional resources.

In 2014, the Butler Libraries adopted a cloud-based library management system. Subsequently, the library's collection practices evolved to include demand-driven acquisitions in 2016.

== Events ==
On February 21, 2017, Irwin Library participated in Butler University's celebration of America's entry into World War I by displaying two exhibits: "The Great War: From Ration Lines to the Front Lines" and "Exploring the Great War Through the Arts". Butler University also held a concert featuring sheet music from "Exploring the Great War Through the Arts": "Britain, the USA,--and Indiana, The Great War in Song: Popular and Art Songs From and About World War I".

== Study rooms ==
Irwin Library features study rooms for individuals and groups that can be used for up to four hours at a time. Students can reserve study rooms ahead of time using Butler University's online reservation system.
