= Teachers College of Indianapolis =

Defunct teachers college in Indiana

- Type: Private Teachers College
- Active: 1882–1930
- President: Institution closed
- Location: Indianapolis, Indiana, United States; 39.7994°N 86.1517°W
- Campus: Urban
- Nickname: Kindergarten Normal Training School

Teachers College of Indianapolis (also known as Indianapolis Teachers College) was a Teachers College in Indianapolis, Indiana founded in 1882 by Eliza A. Blaker. It merged with Butler University to become part of its school of education in 1930.

== History ==
The Teachers College of Indianapolis was first organized by Eliza A. Baker in 1882 under the name of the Kindergarten Normal Training School. The purpose was to train teachers for the kindergartens of the "Indianapolis Free Kindergarten and Children's Aid Society". Blaker served as both superintendent of the Society and president of the Normal School. In 1884 the Society was incorporated with the school as an integral part of it, with the normal school not being separately integrated until 1913. The school was fully funded by donations, with no financial aid from the state of Indiana or other public sources.

=== Buildings ===
For the first 21 years of the school it had no permanent space, however in 1903 a permanent building was erected on the northeast corner of 23rd and Alabama streets in Indianapolis, Indiana. The structure was paid for with private subscriptions was known as the William N. Jackson Memorial Institute. In 1915, the Armenia B. Tuttle addition was built; in 1922 the Model Grade School and Kindergarten building was completed and in 1924, the college purchased a double house adjoining the property of which half was used for a kindergarten and half for a president's house.

=== Coursework and accreditation ===
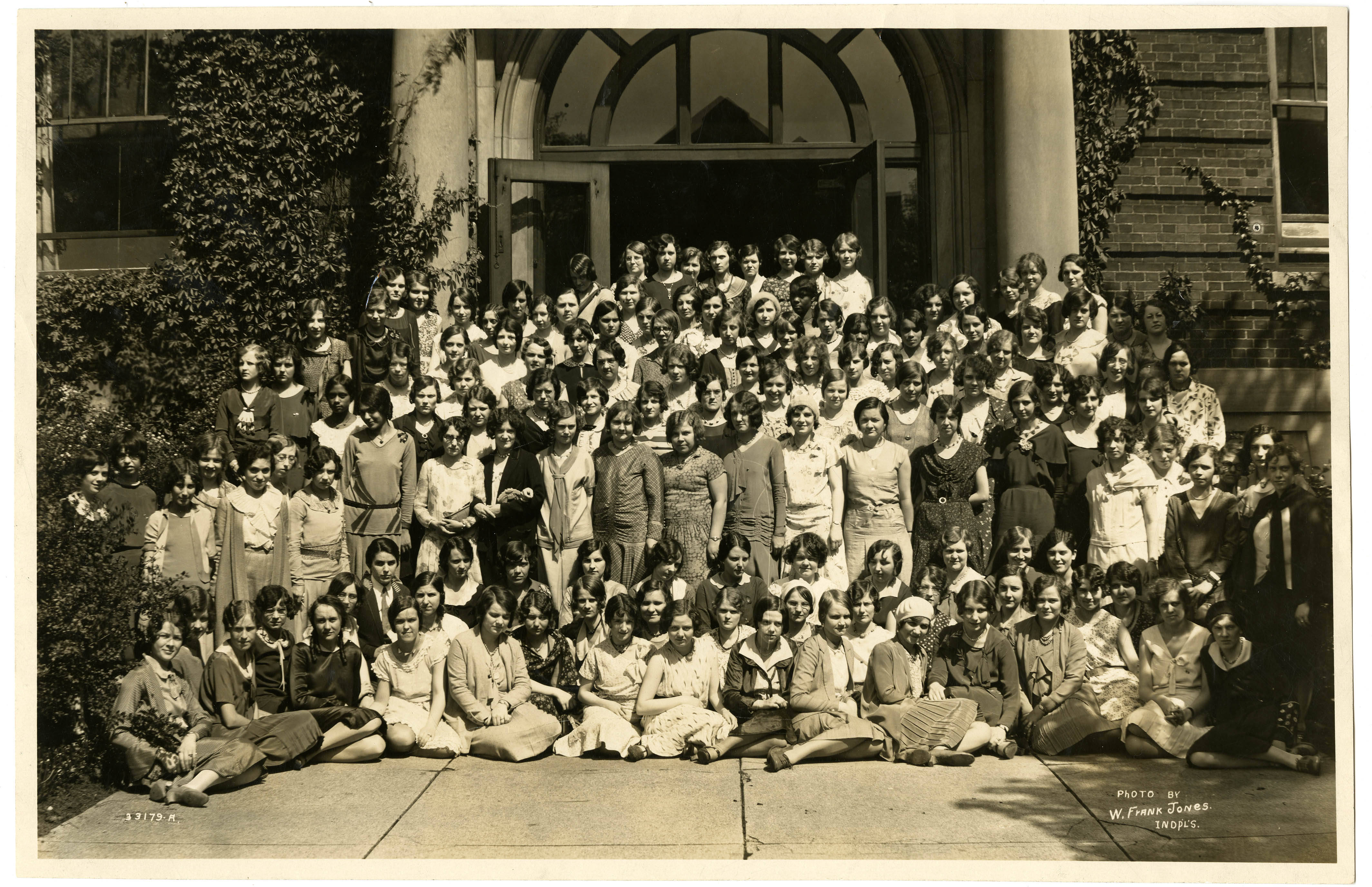
Portrait of students at Eliza Blaker's Teachers College in Indianapolis in 1909.
