= Matt Pivec =

American musician

Matt Pivec is an American saxophonist and the director of Jazz Studies at Butler University.

== Work ==
Pivec has been a prolific saxophonist and worked with several leading musicians and musical groups including Ray Charles, The Temptations, Dave Rivello, Bob Brookmeyer, Peter Erskine, Maria Schneider, Julia Dollison and Melvin Rhyne. He has also toured with Broadway shows like Hairspray and The Producers. In addition to playing jazz, Pivec is also a classical musician and often plays with the Rochester Philharmonic Pops Orchestra.

== Teaching ==
Beyond Pivec's collaborations and performances, he also serves as the director of Jazz studies at Butler University. Before becoming director at Butler, Pivec taught at California State University, Stanislaus and Cornell University.

== Education ==
- Doctor of Musical Arts, Eastman School of Music
- Master of Music, Eastman School of Music
- Bachelor of Music Education, University of Wisconsin-Eau Claire
