= Eliza Cooper Blaker =

American educator (1854–1926)

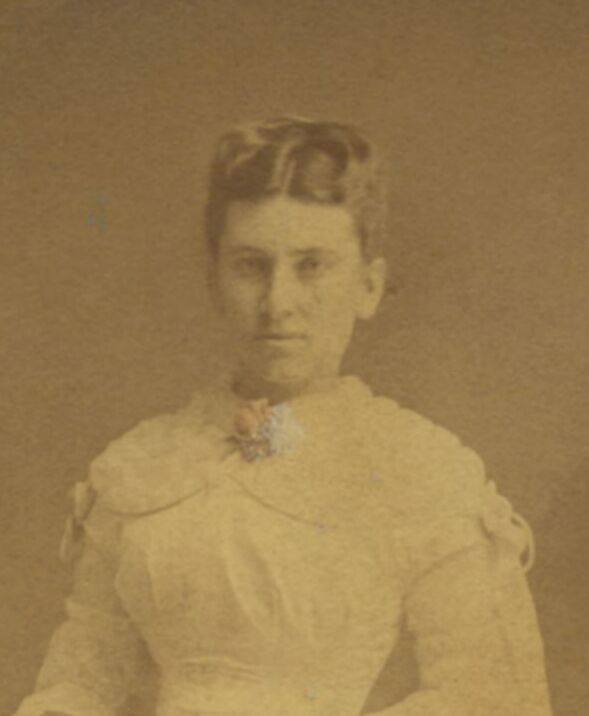
- Born: Eliza Ann Cooper; March 5, 1854; Philadelphia, Pennsylvania
- Died: December 4, 1926 (aged 72); Indianapolis, Indiana
- Resting place: Crown Hill Cemetery, Indianapolis, Indiana, Section 15, Lot 114; 39.8177641°N 86.17536°W
- Citizenship: United States
- Occupation: Kindergarten educator
- Years active: 1874–1926
- Known for: Founder, Teachers College of Indianapolis
- Spouse: Louis J. Blaker (m. 1880; died 1913)
- Parent(s): Jacob Cooper; Mary Jane Core

Eliza Cooper Blaker (March 5, 1854 – December 4, 1926) was an American educator who headed the free kindergarten movement in Indianapolis from 1882 to 1926 as the first superintendent of schools for the Indianapolis Free Kindergarten and Children's Aid Society. She also established the Indianapolis Kindergarten and Primary Normal Training School at her Indianapolis home in 1882. Renamed the Teachers College of Indianapolis in 1905, she served as its president until her death in 1926. Four years later it became part of the education department at Butler University.

== Early life and education ==
Eliza Ann Cooper was born in Philadelphia, Pennsylvania, on March 5, 1854, to Jacob and Mary Jane (Core) Cooper. The eldest of three children, Eliza was raised in a family that struggled financially, especially after her father, an abolitionist Quaker, enlisted in the Union army during the American Civil War. He died in 1869, when Eliza was fifteen. Her mother was a seamstress in Philadelphia. Instead of pulling Eliza out of school to work in the cotton mills, Mary Jane supported her daughter's interest in becoming a teacher. Eliza attended public school and graduated from Girls Normal School of Philadelphia, a teacher's college as class valedictorian in June 1874. After graduation she taught for two years in the Philadelphia public schools.

Cooper first became interested in kindergarten education in 1876, when she attended the Centennial Exposition in Philadelphia and saw a kindergarten demonstration presented by Ruth Burritt, a Boston educator. Cooper completed training at Burritt's kindergarten training school in Philadelphia in 1880 and began her long-time career as a kindergarten educator.

== Marriage and family ==
Cooper married Louis J. Blaker, a childhood friend, on September 15, 1880. The couple had no children. He died of a heart attack in 1913.

== Career ==
=== Kindergarten educator ===
In 1882, when the Hadley Roberts Academy, a private school for affluent families in Indianapolis, began its search for a kindergarten teacher, Burrito recommended Blaker for the position. Black accepted the job and moved to Indianapolis with her husband.

Shortly after the move to Indianapolis, Blaker left the academy to help the Children's Aid Society, founder of the Indianapolis Free Kindergarten Society, established free kindergartens for the city's impoverished children. Because many of the children lacked sufficient clothing or food, the Society sought donations from the community to help obtain the necessary items. The city's free kindergartens also provided services similar to the settlement houses of that era to assist recent immigrants.

The Indianapolis Free Kindergarten and Children's Aid Society incorporated in 1884, the same year that Blaker was selected as its first superintendent. She retained the position until her death in 1926. In its early years Indianapolis's free kindergartens were privately funded through membership dues, community donations, and fund-raising events. In 1901 the Indiana General Assembly passed legislation permitting a portion of local property taxes in towns with a population exceeding 6,000 to be used for the financial support of local kindergartens. By the mid-1910s the Society had established as many as sixty free kindergartens in Indianapolis under Blaker's direction.

Blaker viewed kindergarten teaching as an extended form of mothering. As a result, her school had only female teachers. Blaker explained: "Every school teacher is a foster mother. She is helping the mother in the rearing of her children. The teacher that has not a great mother heart should not have charge of your children in a school room for a number of hours every day. School teaching would be drudgery if we did not love it. It would be abject slavery to any one who did not love children. We must love little children if we are going to help them."

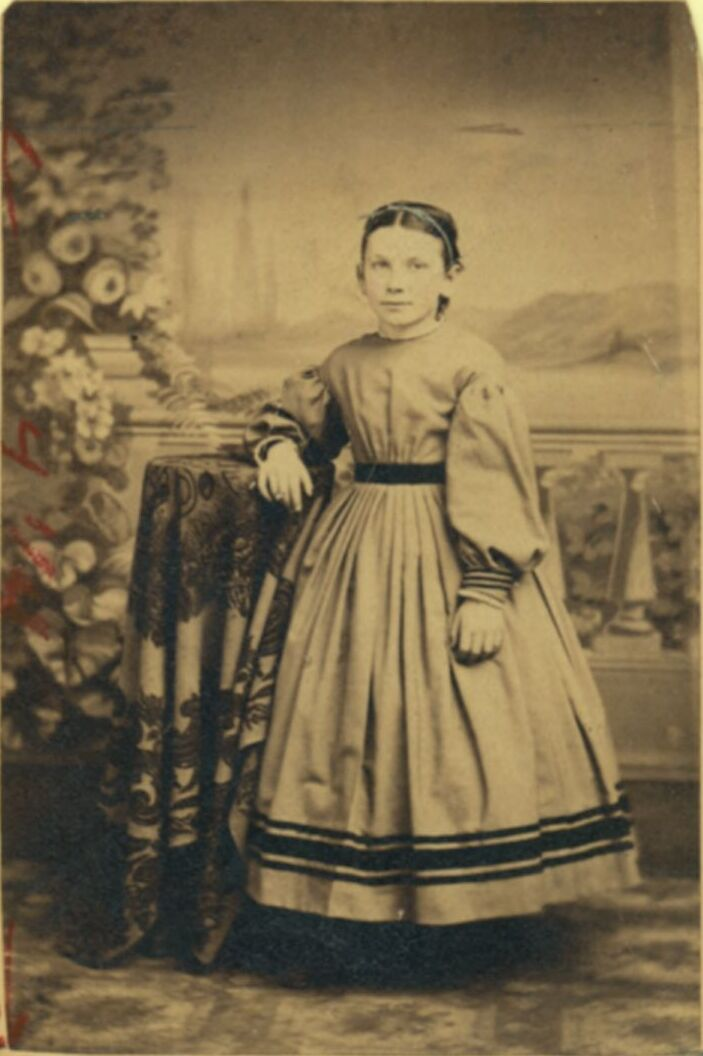
Eliza A. Cooper (Blaker), Age 8, photographed in Philadelphia, Pennsylvania.

Under Blaker's direction, Indianapolis's free kindergartens gained a national reputation among educators. Based on the theories of Frederich Froebel and Elizabeth Palmer Peabody, Blaker's schools sought to provide students with "a wholesome environment" and denounced corporal punishment when a child misbehaved. Instead, Blaker encouraged parents and teachers to discover the underlying reasons for a child's behavior and to find a solution that avoided violence. Blaker's methods also included efforts to involve the whole family in the child's education. In 1884 she organized a mothers' club that provided an opportunity for social gatherings as well as classes on child care and early child development. In 1889 Blaker's schools offered Saturday classes on domestic training and household management for older girls and manual arts for boys.

=== Founder, teacher training school ===
In addition to establishing kindergarten schools, Blaker also identified the need to provide well-trained kindergarten teachers. To help satisfy the demand, she established a teacher training school in 1882. The Indianapolis Kindergarten and Primary Normal Training School, which the locals sometimes referred to as "Mrs. Blaker's College," began at her home. As its enrollment increased the school moved to several locations in Indianapolis. It became the Teachers College of Indianapolis in 1905. It 1930, four years after Blaker's death, the school became part of Butler University's education department.

In 1883, Blaker had twelve students and within a decade that number had jumped to 344. In 1905 the school became formally known as the Teachers College of Indianapolis. By 1907 a total of 49,353 children had enrolled in thirty-five free kindergartens in Indianapolis and upwards of 5,500 teachers had been trained under Blaker's tenure. The Teachers College incorporated in 1914 and Blaker served as its president until her death in 1926. The training school's faculty and students were all women. Blaker maintained strict standards for the school, whose teacher trainees had a nightly curfew, followed a dress code, and attended mandatory religious services.

Blaker became a leader in the International Kindergarten Union and the National Education Association. Several graduates of her school went on to establish kindergarten programs in other Indiana cities, such as Evansville, Lafayette, and Bloomington, and in other states, including Tennessee, Ohio, Michigan, and Pennsylvania.

== Other interests ==
In addition to her work as an educator, Blaker had other civic interests. She was foundress and president of the Indianapolis Council of Women and a member of the Woman's Rotary Club and Indianapolis's Contemporary Club. In the aftermath of the Great Flood of 1913, she chaired a women's relief committee in Indianapolis to assist local citizens recover from the disaster. Blaker also was a member of Indianapolis's Second Presbyterian Church.

== Death and legacy ==
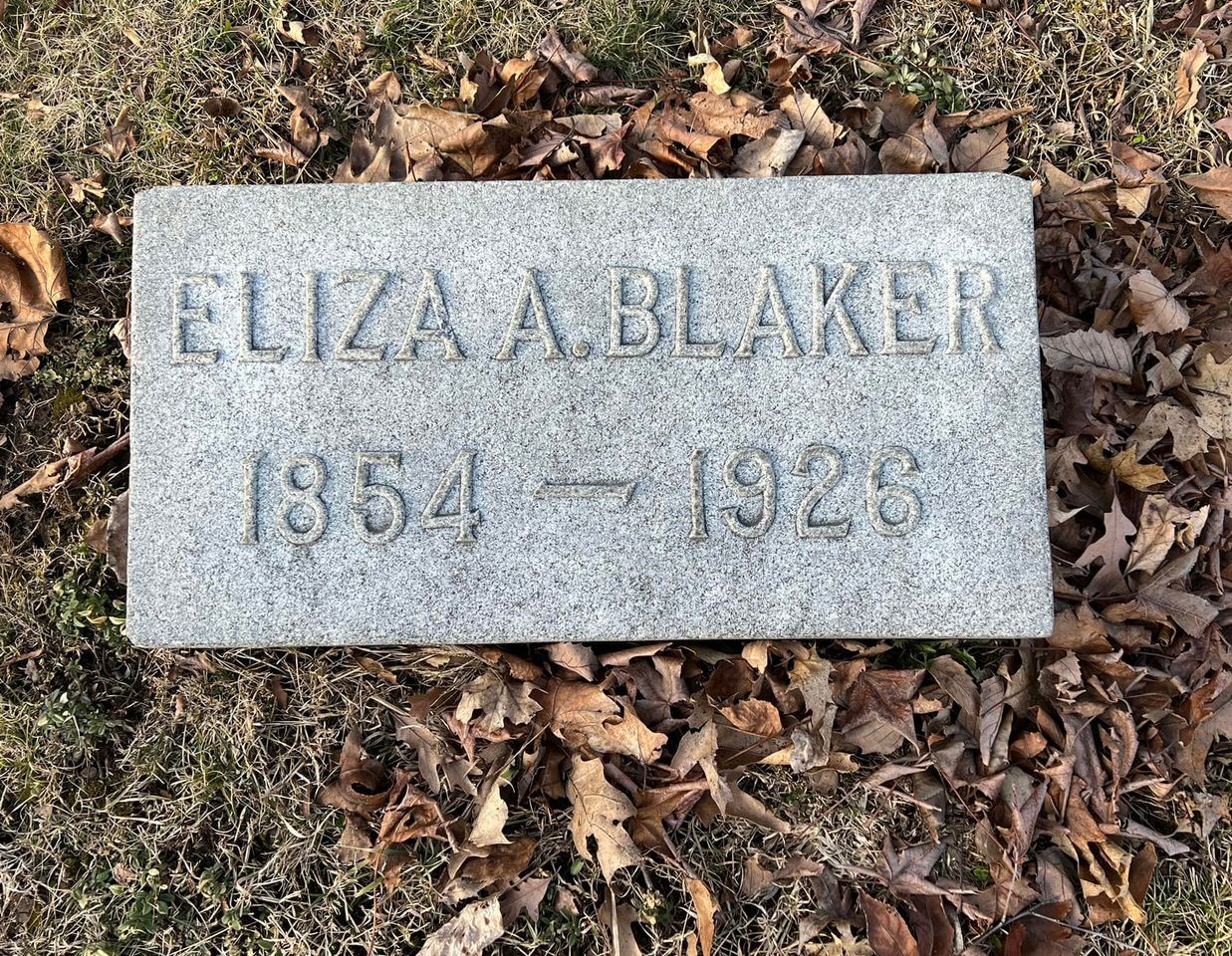
Eliza Blaker's tombstone in Crownhill Cemetery, Indianapolis, IN.

Blaker suffered a heart attack and died at her home on December 4, 1926, at the age of 72. Her remains are interred Indianapolis's Crown Hill Cemetery.

Blaker was known for her love of teaching. According to Lois Hufford, one of the founders of the Indianapolis Children's Aid Society, "The welfare of the child and the home was always first in her thought."

In 1930, four years after Blaker's death, the Teacher's College became part of Butler University. In 1952 kindergarten education was incorporated into the Indianapolis Public Schools.

== Honors and tributes ==
- In 1917 Hanover College in Hanover, Indiana, conferred an honorary doctorate degree on Blaker.
- In 1926 the Indianapolis News named Blaker one of the "ten greatest women" then living in Indiana.
- On January 27, 1934, alumnae and faculty of the Teachers College of Indianapolis established the Eliza A. Blaker Club. The group established a room in her honor at Butler University in 1943. (The Eliza Blaker Memorial Room is in Butler's Irwin Library.)
- In 1958 the Indianapolis Public Schools named an elementary school in her honor.
- Eliza A. Blaker Memorial Scholarship at Butler University is awarded annually to students enrolled in Butler's College of Education.
