= Arthur Jordan Memorial Hall =

- U.S. National Register of Historic Places
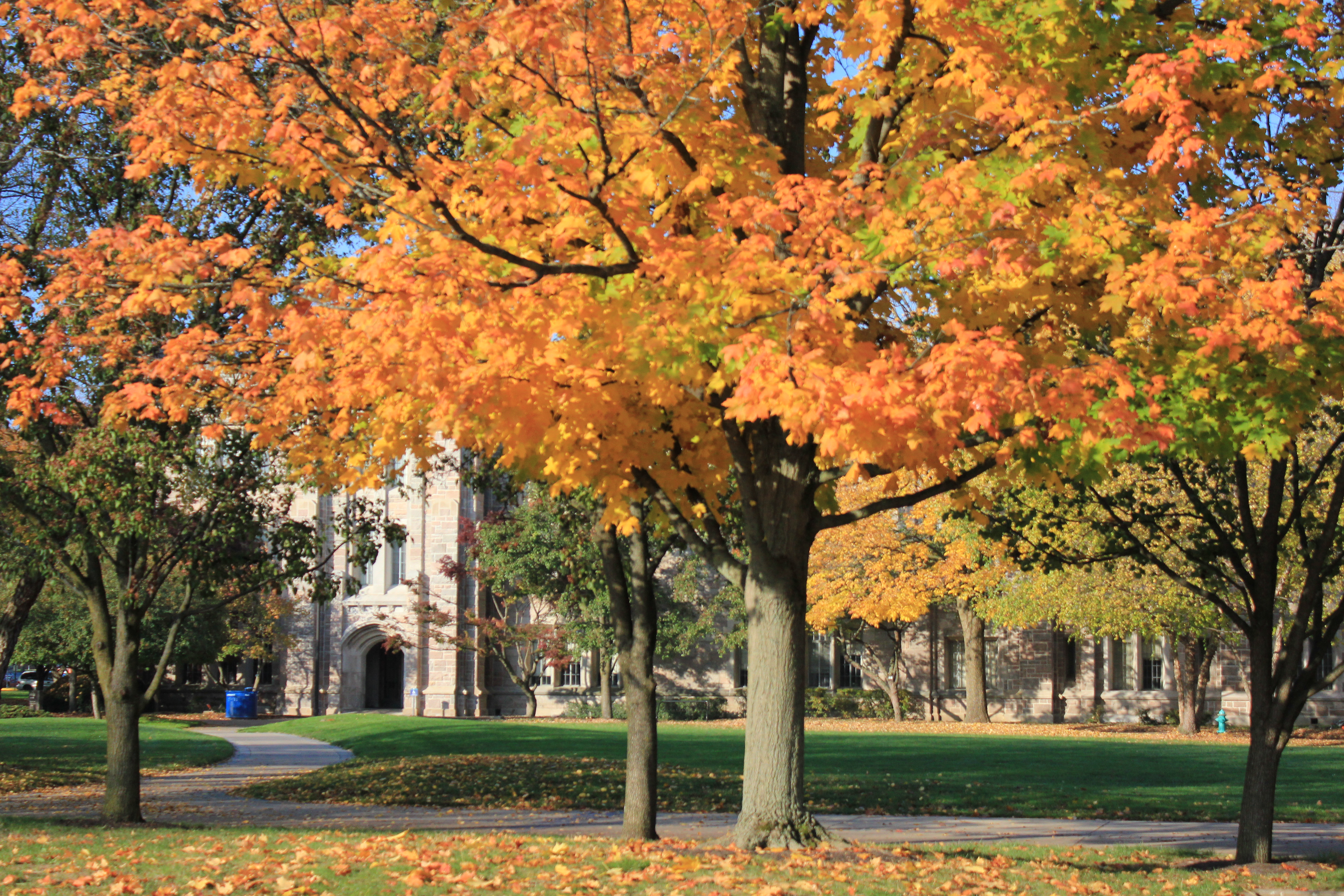
- The east side of Jordan Hall

- Location within Indianapolis Location within Indiana Location within the United States
- Location: 4600 Sunset Ave., Indianapolis, Indiana
- Coordinates: 39°50′19″N 86°10′20″W
- Area: 1.8 acres (0.73 ha)
- Built: 1928
- Architect: Daggett, Robert Frost; Joshua L. Fatout; K. Moses
- Architectural style: English Collegiate Gothic
- NRHP reference No.: 83000134
- Added to NRHP: June 30, 1983

The Arthur Jordan Memorial Hall, often referred to as "Jordan Hall", is a historic building on the campus of Butler University in Indianapolis, Indiana, United States. It is one of the original buildings of the campus, along with Atherton Union and Hinkle Fieldhouse. It was designed by architect Robert Frost Daggett and built in 1928. A four-story, Collegiate Gothic style building, it is a reinforced concrete structure with bearing walls of pink granite with limestone trim.

It was added to the National Register of Historic Places in June, 1983.

== Use ==
Jordan Hall houses the offices of the President of the university, provost, and the dean of the College of Liberal Arts and Sciences. The majority of the courses of the College of Liberal Arts and Sciences at Butler are in Jordan Hall.

== Gallery ==
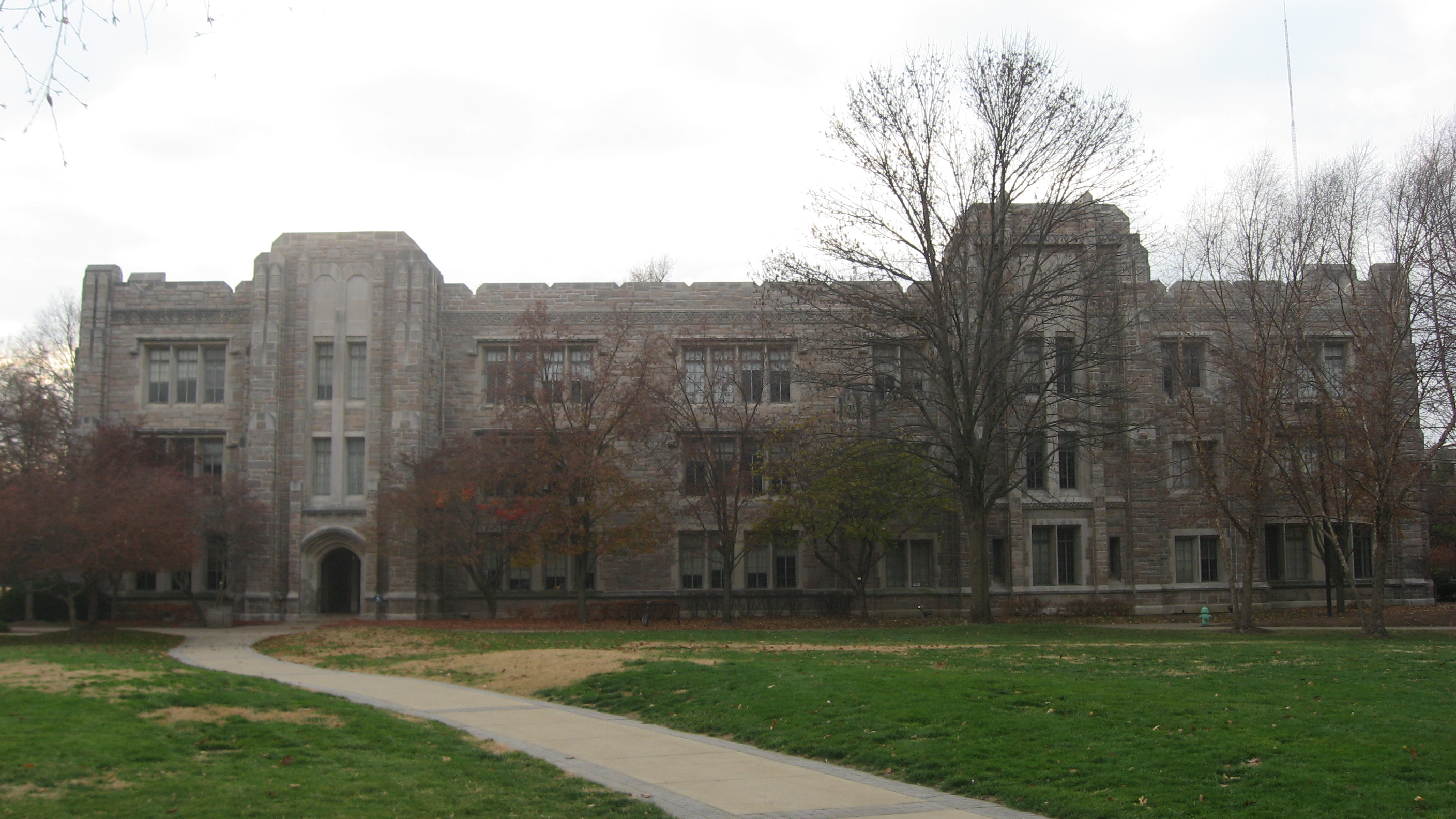
Eastern front of Jordan Hall

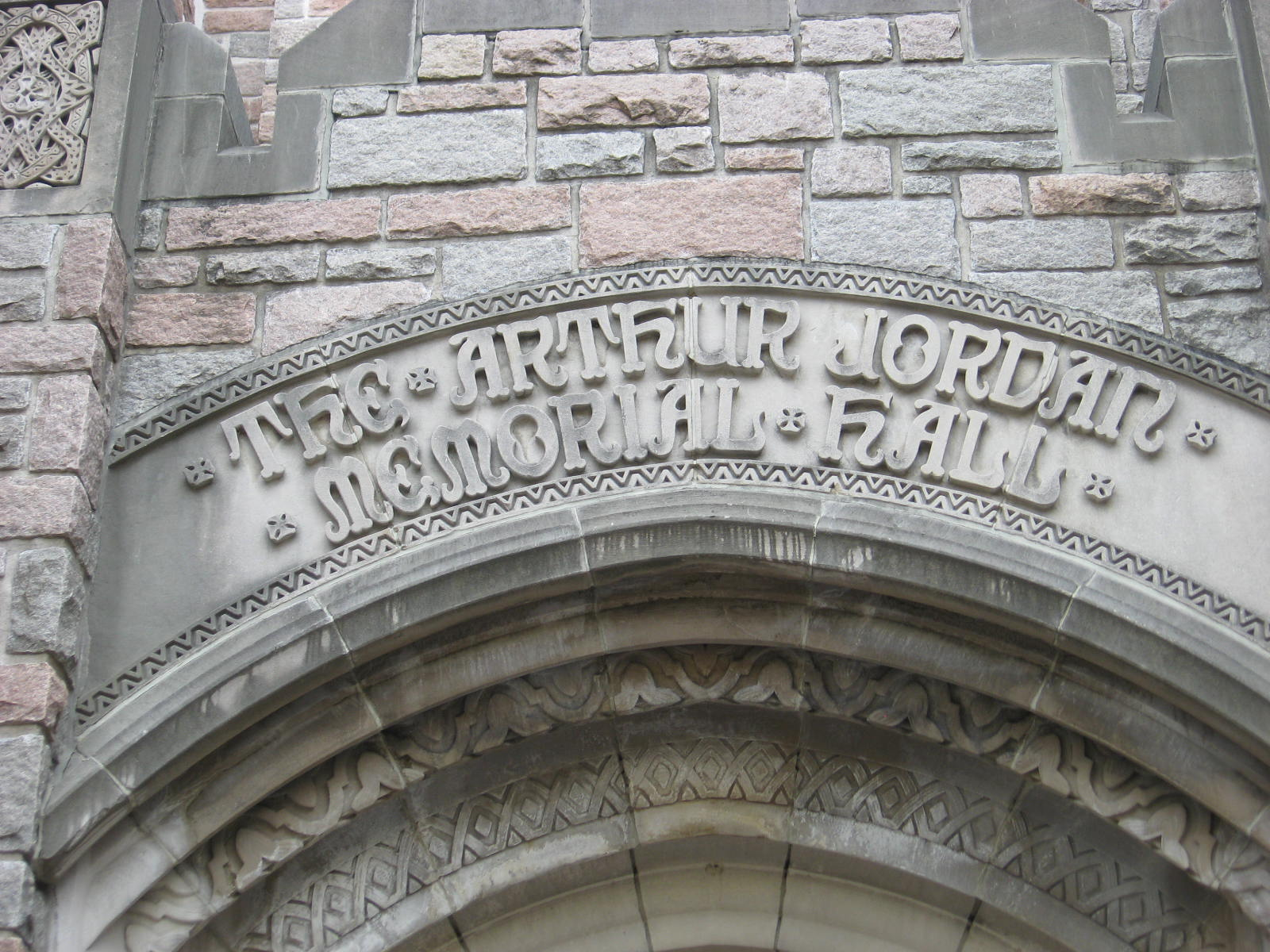
Close-up of the script

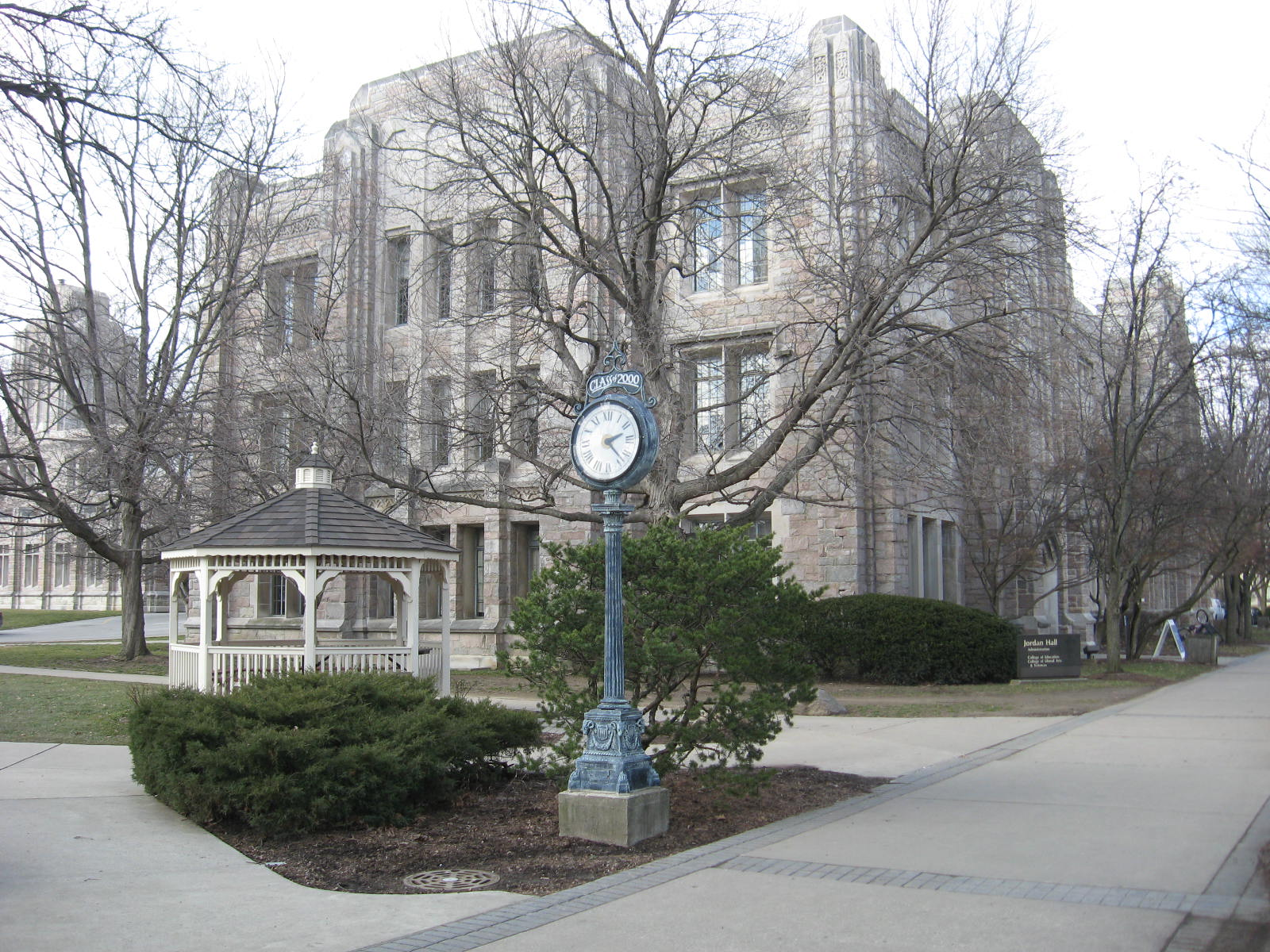
The south side of Jordan Hall

== See also ==
- National Register of Historic Places listings in Marion County, Indiana
