= R. Carlyle Buley =

American historian

Roscoe Carlyle Buley
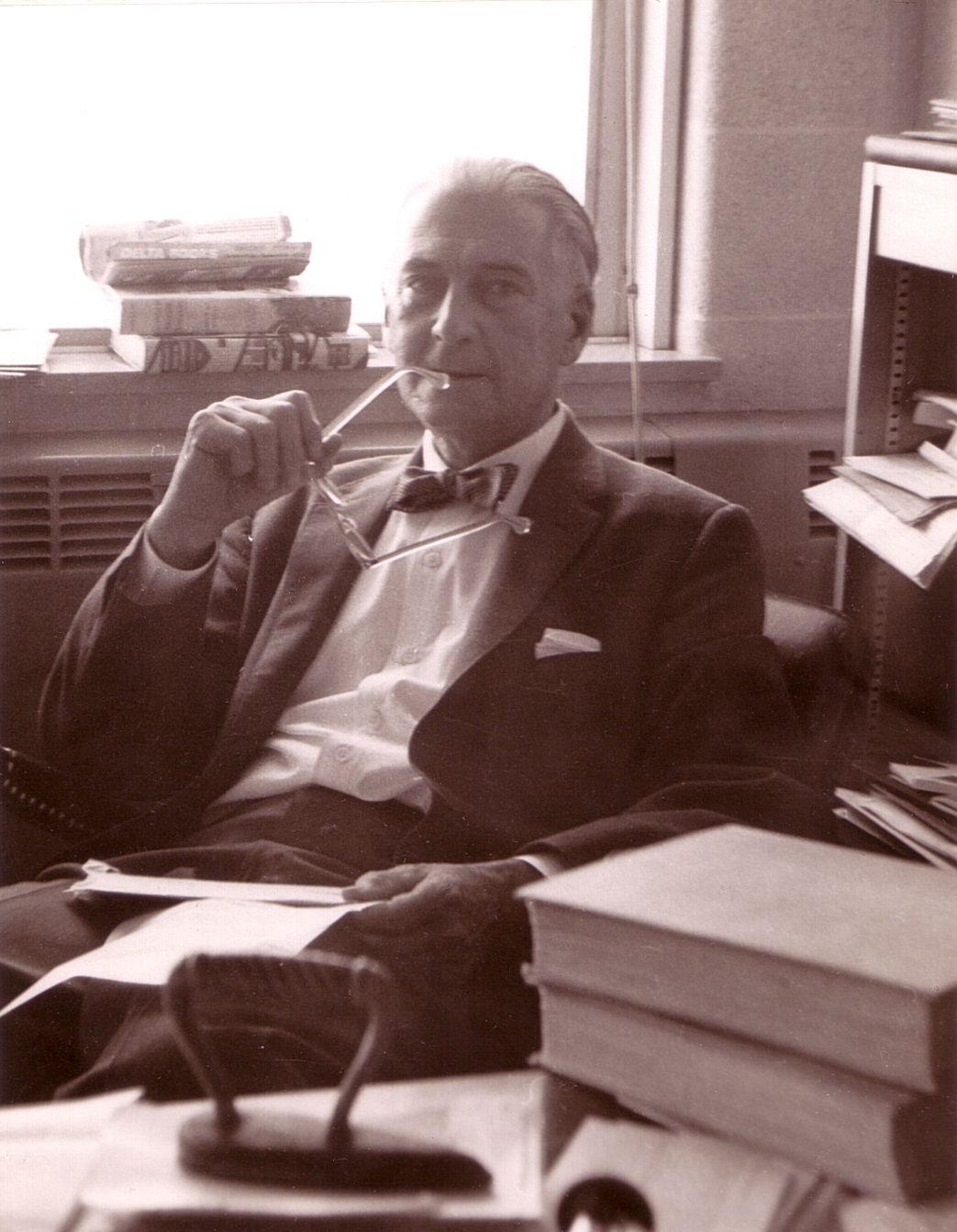
- Born: July 8, 1893; Georgetown, Floyd County, Indiana, US
- Died: April 25, 1968 (aged 74); Indianapolis, Indiana, US

Roscoe Carlyle Buley (July 8, 1893 – April 25, 1968) was an American historian and educator.

== Personal life and educational background ==
Buley was born in Georgetown, Floyd County, Indiana, the son of David M. Buley, a school teacher from Indiana, and Nora (Keithley) Buley, and graduated from Vincennes Lincoln High School in 1910. He received his B.A. from Indiana University in 1914 and his M.A. from the same institution in 1916.

During World War I, Buley served for a year in the U.S. Army Signal Corps. He then returned home and married Esther Giles (1898–1921) in 1919. After Esther's death in 1921, Buley married Evelyn Barnett (January 14, 1904 – February 28, 1989). He taught high school history at Delphi and Muncie, Indiana, and Springfield, Illinois, before receiving his PhD from the University of Wisconsin–Madison in 1925.

In 1925–1964 Buley was a professor of history at Indiana University, serving as emeritus professor from 1964 until his death in Indianapolis on April 25, 1968, at the age of 74.

== Works and awards ==
Buley authored numerous articles, reviews, and books, winning the 1951 Pulitzer Prize for History for his 2-volume work The Old Northwest: Pioneer Period 1815–1840 (1950).

He won the Elizur Wright Award for The American Life Convention, 1906-1952: Study in the History of Life Insurance (2 vols.) (1953). In 2007 he was honored by his former high school as a distinguished alumnus. Noted for always having an open door to students who wished to chat, in 1962 Indiana University's Sigma Delta Chi journalism society presented him the Brown Derby Award for being the most popular professor on campus.

== Views ==
No mere pedagogue, Buley took a broad view of education, as he expressed in The Old Northwest: Pioneer Period 1815–1840: "Much has been made, perhaps too much, of the illiteracy of the pioneer, of the lack of schools, and of the general backwardness of the southern emigrants in comparison with the eastern. Schools do not necessarily produce literates; literacy – the mere ability to pronounce a few written words – has little to do with education; and there are other ways of getting an education than in schools. As James Hall said: 'A human being may know how to read, and yet be a very stupid fellow.... Reading and writing are not magic arts; of themselves, they are of little value... and thousands of individuals with diplomas in their pockets are far inferior, in point of common sense and information, to the common run of backwoodsmen.'"
