= Butler University =

Private university in Indianapolis, Indiana, US

- Former names: North-Western Christian University (1855–1877); Butler College (1896–1906)
- Motto: Education, Research, Service
- Type: Private university
- Established: November 1, 1855; 171 years ago
- Accreditation: Higher Learning Commission
- Academic affiliations: Council of Independent Colleges
- Endowment: $319.2 million (2025)
- President: James Danko
- Provost: Brooke Barnett
- Academic staff: 372 (2024)
- Students: 5,763 (2024)
- Undergraduates: 4,519
- Postgraduates: 1,244
- Location: Indianapolis, Indiana, United States; 39°50′22″N 86°10′17″W
- Campus: Urban: 295 acres (119 ha)
- Colors: Blue and white
- Nickname: Bulldogs
- Sporting affiliations: NCAA Division I Big East, Pioneer League (football)
- Mascots: Butler Blue IV; Hink
- Website: butler.edu

Butler University is a private university in Indianapolis, Indiana, United States. Founded in 1855 and named after founder Ovid Butler, the university has over 60 major academic fields of study within six colleges in the arts, business, communication, education, liberal arts and the sciences, and health sciences. It enrolls approximately 5,700 undergraduate and graduate students. Its 295-acre (119 ha) campus is approximately five miles (8.0 km) north of downtown Indianapolis.

== History ==
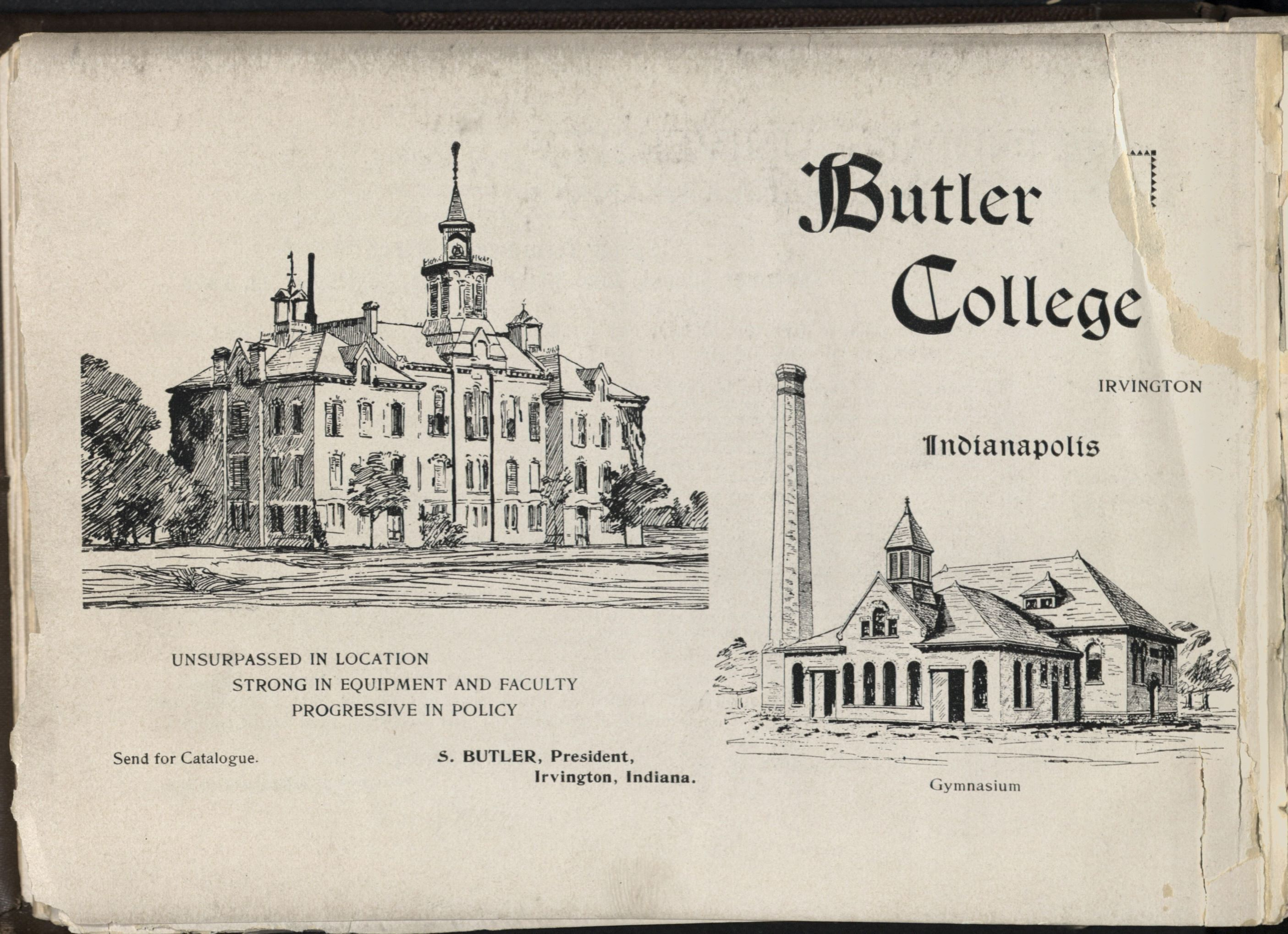
Illustrations depicting buildings on the school's Irvington campus in 1896

On January 15, 1850, the Indiana General Assembly adopted Ovid Butler's proposed charter for a new Christian university in Indianapolis. After five years in development, the school opened on November 1, 1855, as North-Western Christian University at 13th Street and College Avenue on Indianapolis's near northside at the eastern edge of the present-day Old Northside Historic District. Attorney and university founder Ovid Butler provided the property. The university was founded by members of the Christian Church (Disciples of Christ), although it was never controlled by that church. The university's charter called for "a non-sectarian institution free from the taint of slavery, offering instruction in every branch of liberal and professional education". The university was the second in Indiana and the third in the United States to admit both men and women.

The university established the first professorship in English literature and the first Department of English in the state of Indiana. In 1869, Ovid Butler endowed the Demia Butler Chair of English Literature in honor of his daughter, who was the first woman to graduate from the Classical course at the university and had died in 1867. The chair was the first endowed position at an American university designated for a female professor. Catharine Merrill, was the first to occupy the chair in 1869. Merrill was just the second female university professor in the country.

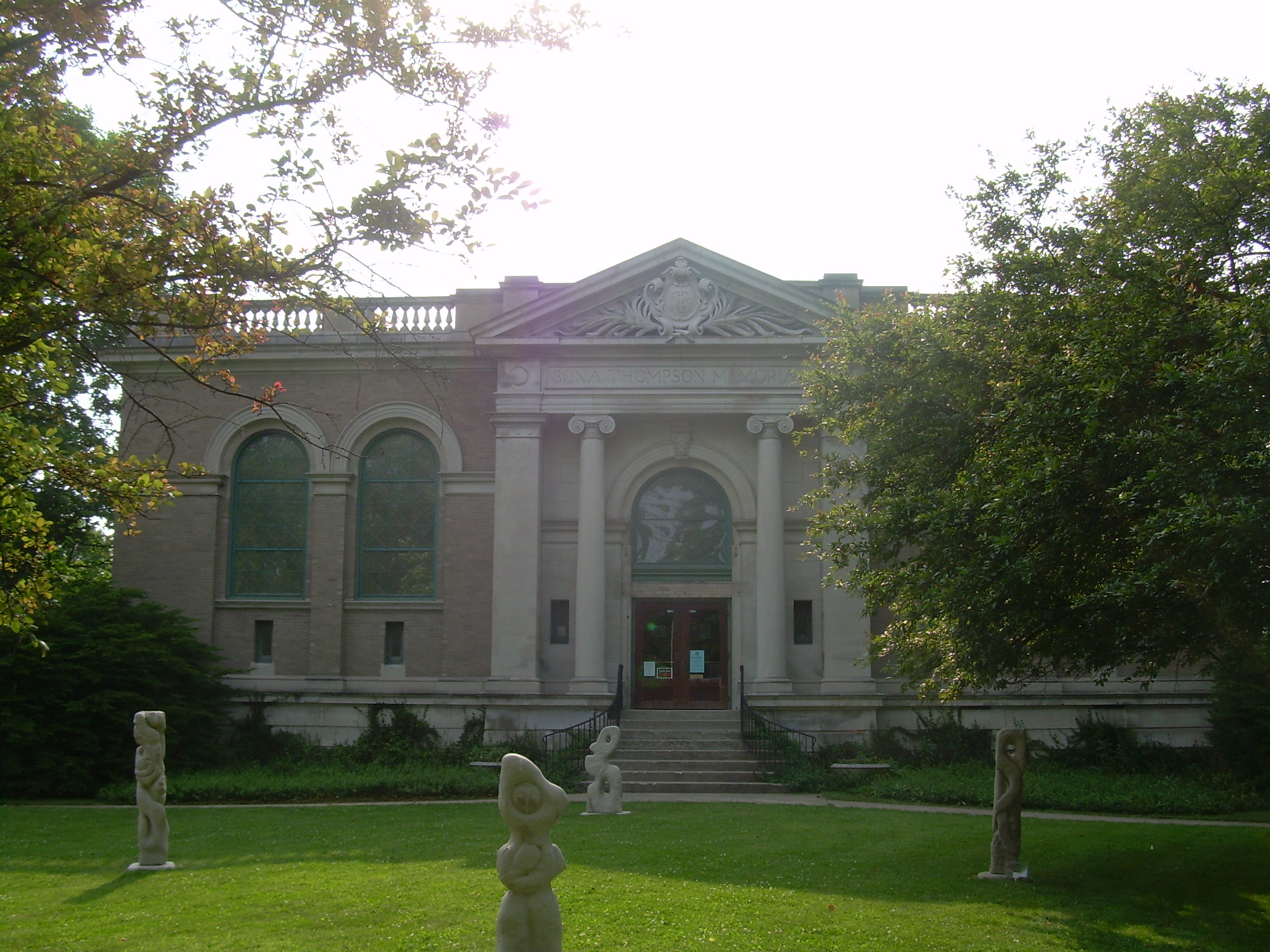
Bona Thompson Memorial Library, the only remaining building from Butler's Irvington campus

The university moved to a new 25-acre (10 ha) campus in the community of Irvington on the east side of Indianapolis in 1875, and changed its name to Butler University in 1877. The university was renamed for Ovid Butler "in recognition of Ovid Butler's inspirational vision, determined leadership, and financial support". The campus consisted of several buildings, including an observatory, most of which were demolished in 1939. The Bona Thompson Library at the intersection of Downey and University avenues, designed by architects Henry H. Dupont and Jesse T. Johnson, is the only remaining building, although several buildings that housed faculty remain, including the Benton House.

In 1896, Butler joined with two private professional schools, the Medical College of Indiana and the Indiana Law School, to form the University of Indianapolis (U of I), an institution unrelated to the modern university of that name. The Indiana Dental College later joined in 1904. Renamed as Butler College, the school constituted the undergraduate and liberal arts organ of the new university. Butler left U of I in 1906 after the Medical College of Indiana joined with Purdue University's medical school in 1905 (itself later merging with the Indiana University School of Medicine in 1908).

In 1930, Butler merged with the Teachers College of Indianapolis, founded by Eliza Cooper Blaker, creating the university's second college. The third college, the College of Business Administration, was established in 1937, and the College of Pharmacy and Health Sciences was established in 1945, following a merger that absorbed the Indianapolis College of Pharmacy. The Jordan College of Fine Arts, the university's fifth college, was established in 1951, following a merger with the Arthur Jordan Conservatory of Music.

The university's department of religion became a separate Christian Church seminary and "college of applied Christianity" in 1924; it was variously called the School of Religion and the College of Religion. The school became independent in 1958 and is currently known as the Christian Theological Seminary.

== Campus ==
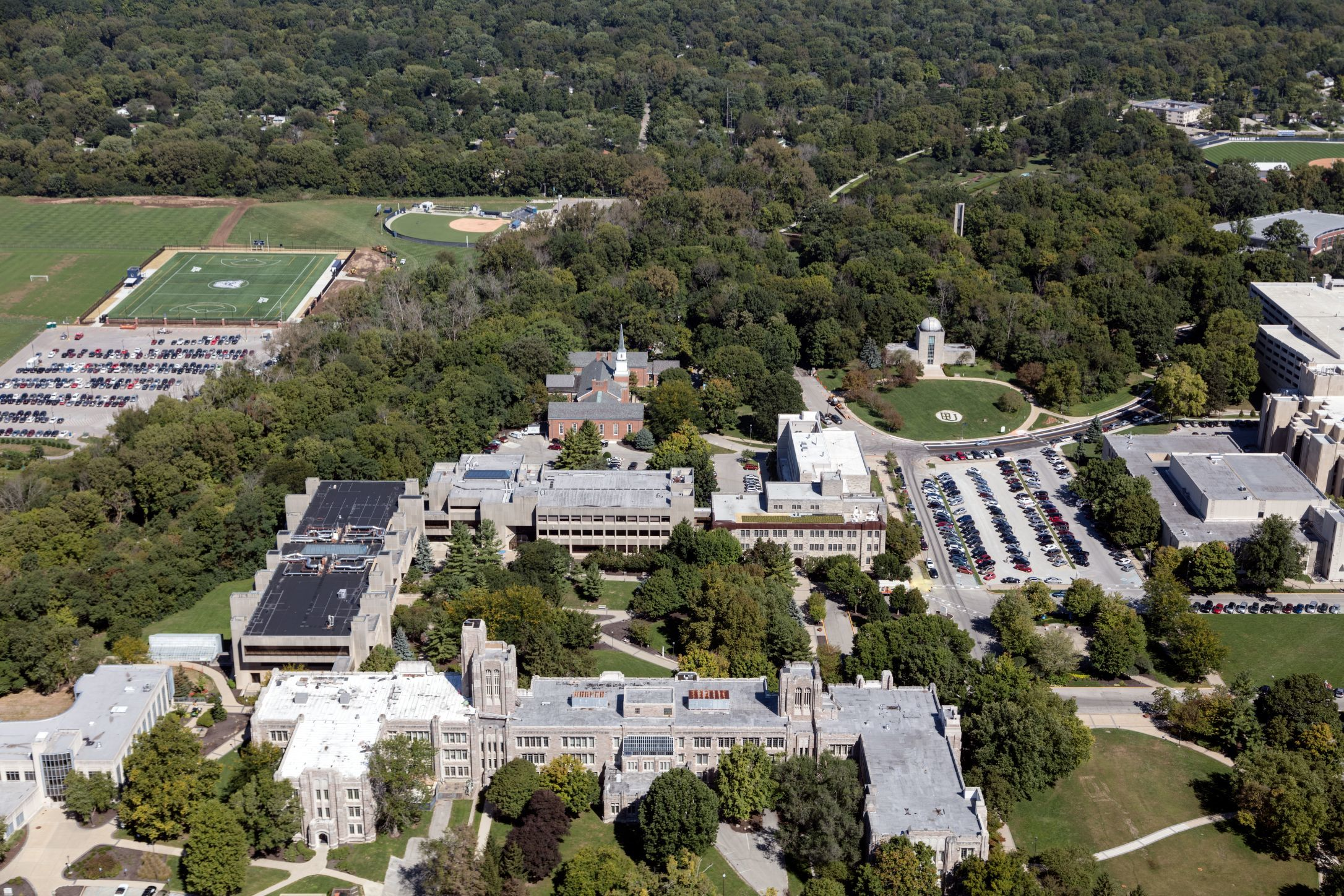
Aerial of Butler University campus (2016)

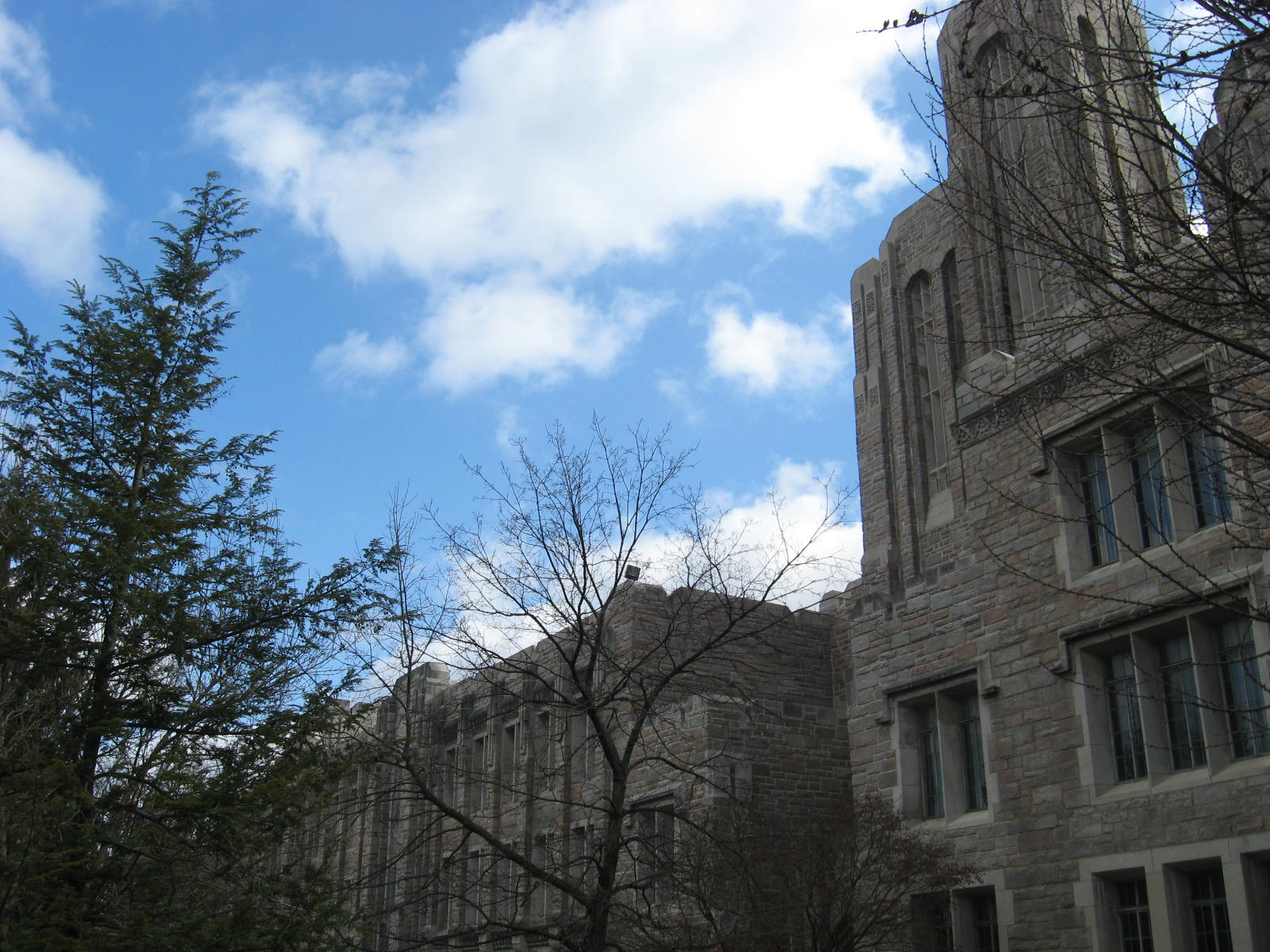
Arthur Jordan Memorial Hall, completed in 1928, is the oldest structure on campus.

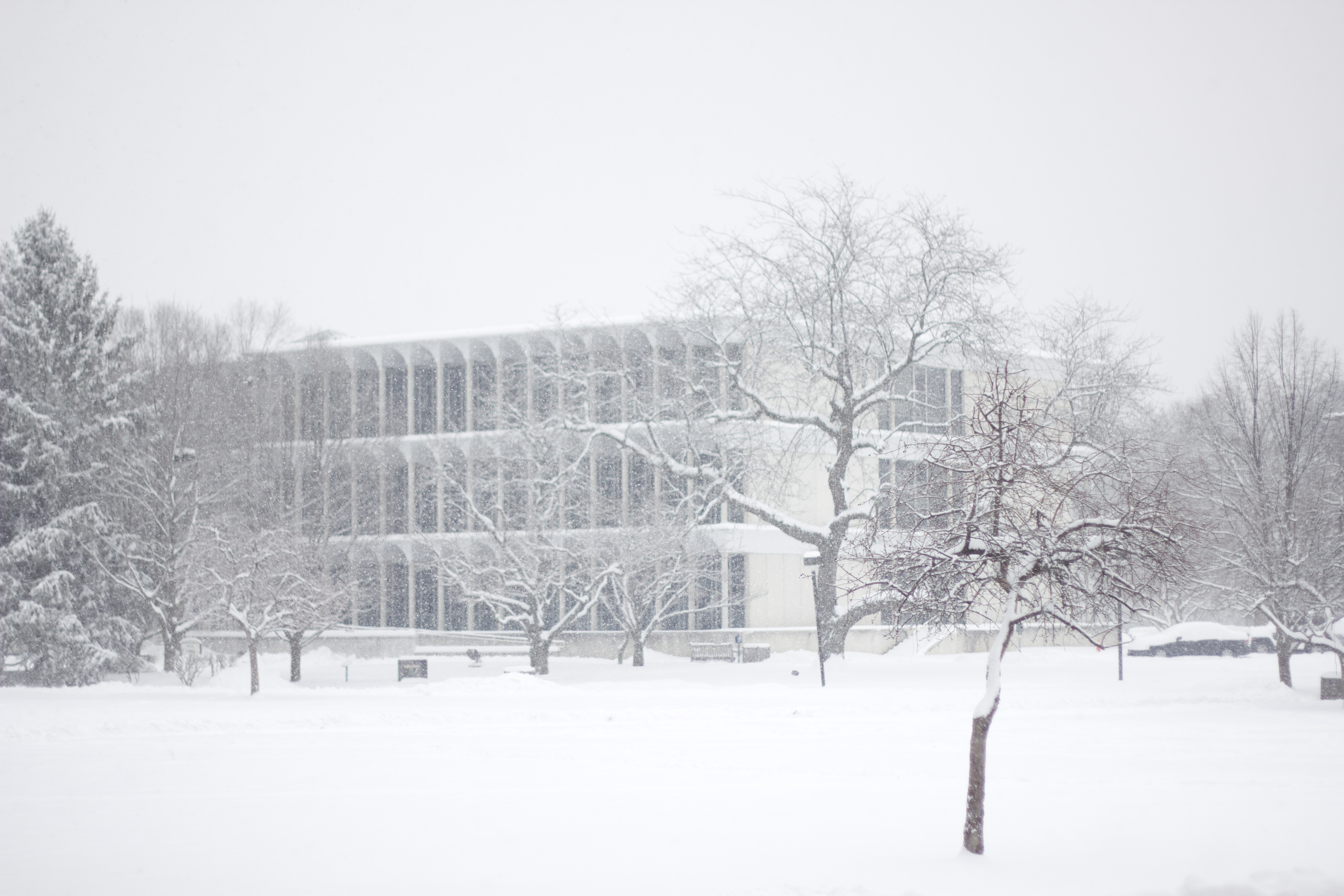
Minoru Yamasaki's Irwin Library in snow

Enrollment at Butler increased following the end of World War I, prompting the administration to examine the need for a larger campus. The new and current campus, designed in part by architect George Sheridan, was formed on the site of Fairview Park, a former amusement park on the city's northwest side. Classes began on the campus in 1928.

In 1928, the first building completed on the Fairview campus was Arthur Jordan Memorial Hall, designed by Robert Frost Daggett and Thomas Hibben. The structure's Collegiate Gothic style of architecture, also used in the original William Tinsley-designed 13th Street and College Avenue building, set the tone for subsequent buildings erected on the campus over the next three decades. The same year, the Butler Fieldhouse (later renamed Hinkle Fieldhouse) was completed after having been designed by architect Fermor Spencer Cannon. The building remained the largest indoor sports facility in the state until the mid-1960s.

In 1942, the Religion Building and Sweeney Chapel were both completed. These structures, designed by Burns and James, were remodeled and combined into Robertson Hall in 1966.

Following World War II, construction began on the student center, Atherton Union (designed by McGuire and Shook). McGuire and Shook also designed the dormitories called Ross Hall and Schwitzer Hall. Art Lindbergh, with help from Daggett, designed the Holcomb Observatory and Planetarium, which was dedicated in 1955.

In 1963, Irwin Library, designed by acclaimed architect Minoru Yamasaki, opened. Also in the early 1960s, Lilly Hall and Clowes Memorial Hall were constructed following the move of the Arthur Jordan Conservatory of Music to the campus. Clowes Hall, which opened in 1963, was co-designed by Indianapolis architect Evans Woollen III and John M. Johansen (of New Canaan, Connecticut). Ten years following the construction of Clowes Hall and Irwin Library, the science complex of Gallahue Hall and the Holcomb Research Institute (now Holcomb Building) were built, completing the U-shaped complex of academic buildings.

In 1990, the Residential College, designed by James and Associates, was completed, becoming the university's last major construction project of the 20th century.

In 2001, the Fairbanks Center for Communication and Technology was opened.

In early 2004, the Eidson-Duckwall Recital Hall, seating 140, was added onto Robertson Hall.

On May 8, 2008, Butler broke ground on a 40,000-square-foot (3,700 m^{2}), four-story addition to the Pharmacy and Health Sciences Building.

In 2013, the Howard L. Schrott Center for the Arts opened.

== Academics ==
Academic rankings

Master's
- Washington Monthly: 163

Regional
- U.S. News & World Report: 1

National
- Forbes: 216
- WSJ/College Pulse: 165

The university is organized into the following schools and colleges:

- Andre B. Lacy School of Business
- College of Communication
- College of Education
- College of Liberal Arts and Sciences
- College of Pharmacy and Health Sciences
- Jordan College of the Arts
- Founder's College

Over 60 major academic fields of study, 8 pre-professional programs, and 19 graduate programs are offered across the seven academic colleges. Butler ranks first among Midwest Regional Universities in U.S. News & World Report's 2024 Best Colleges. The publication also ranked the university first in the Midwest for both innovation and undergraduate teaching. Nationally, the publication ranked Butler 16th for first-year experiences and 28th for study abroad opportunities.

The university emphasizes the practicality of knowledge and offers individual attention to its students with its small class size and no teaching assistants. Butler University increased its focus on faculty and student research with the Butler Institute for Research and Scholarship (BIRS), bolstered by a $1-million grant from Lilly Endowment. The university also provides student research opportunities, such as the Butler Summer Institute, a 10-week program in which Butler students are granted funding to perform independent research with a faculty member.

=== Founder's College ===
In the fall of 2025, the Founder's College opened its doors to 100 students making up its first cohort. Named after Butler's abolitionist founder, Ovid Butler, this institution aims to serve students that are a part of historically underserved communities. The inaugural dean, Carolyn Gentle-Gennitty was named in June 2024, ahead of its opening.

The goal of the Founder's College is to be an institution that allows students to earn a 2-year degree debt-free, while offering wraparound support for students facing demographic challenges. Founder's college utilizes the Come to Believe Network model implemented at Arrupe College of Loyola University Chicago. Under this model, their aim is to remove the barriers of high performing students with low income backgrounds by surrounding the students with support services. The students receive full wrap around services that include free laptops, access to free meals, full book support, a counselor, career coaching and access to a social worker in addition to free tuition.

== Student life ==
Student body composition as of May 2, 2022
Race and ethnicity	Total
White	83%
Hispanic	6%
Black	4%
Other (Note: Other consists of Multiracial Americans & those who prefer to not say.)	4%
Asian	3%
Foreign national	1%
Economic diversity
Low-income (Note: The percentage of students who received an income-based federal Pell grant intended for low-income students.)	14%
Affluent (Note: The percentage of students who are a part of the American middle class at the bare minimum.)	86%

Students at Butler University participate in more than 150 student organizations and dozens of club and intramural sports, and many multi-cultural programs and services. More than 94 percent of students are involved in campus activities.

=== Greek organizations ===
Greek life is a popular option at Butler with over 35 percent of undergraduates becoming members of social fraternities or sororities. Fraternities and sororities have long been a part of student life at Butler, with the first fraternity established in 1859, and the first sorority established in 1874.

In 1922, Sigma Gamma Rho was founded at Butler University. The sorority had its beginnings on the Irvington campus of Butler University.

== Athletics ==
Butler's athletic teams, known as the Butler Bulldogs, compete in Division I of the NCAA. On July 1, 2012, the Bulldogs left the Horizon League, their conference home since 1979, for the Atlantic 10 Conference. Since the A-10 does not sponsor football, the Butler football team plays in the FCS's Pioneer League. The women's golf team at Butler joined the Metro Atlantic Athletic Conference, as the A-10 sponsors the sport only for men. Butler left the Atlantic 10 Conference and became a founding member of the reconfigured Big East Conference on July 1, 2013.

In the past decade, Butler teams have captured 26 conference championships (in four different leagues). The Bulldogs have made appearances in NCAA National Championship Tournaments in men's and women's basketball, men's soccer, volleyball, men's cross country, lacrosse, and baseball. Butler won the James J. McCafferty trophy, awarded annually by the Horizon League for all-sports excellence based on conference championship points, seven times, including three-straight from 1996 to 1997 to 1998–99 and back-to-back years in 2001–02 and 2002–03, 2006–07, and 2009–10.

=== Men's basketball ===
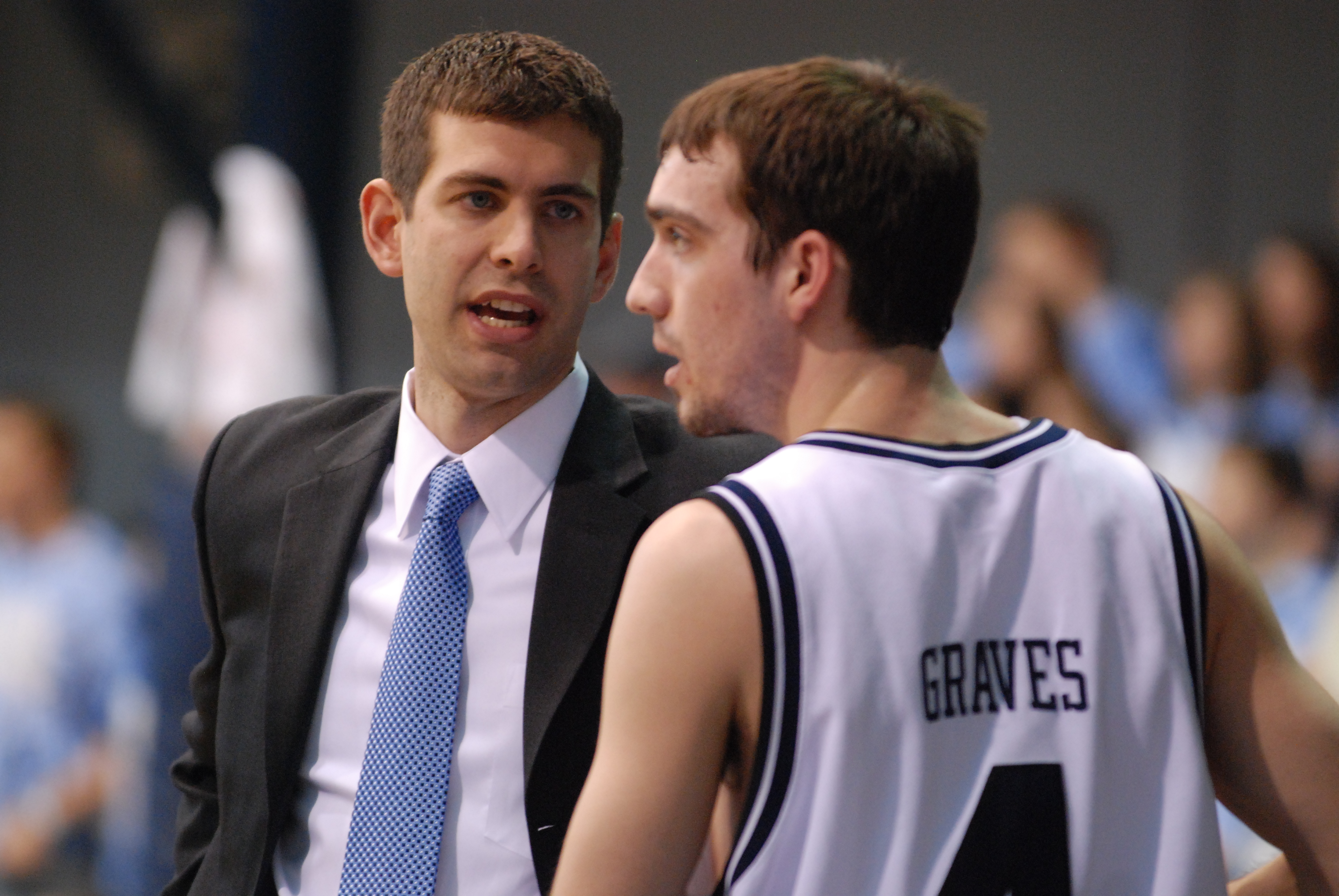
Former Butler head coach Brad Stevens led his teams to two NCAA Men's Division I Basketball Championship games in his six seasons as head coach (2007–2013).

The Butler program was one of the most successful "mid-major" basketball programs from 2000 to 2011, having won at least 20 games and reached postseason play eight of the last ten seasons, including six NCAA tournament appearances. Butler also holds two national championships in men's basketball from the pre-tournament era: one from 1924 (earned via the AAU national tournament), and one from 1929 (selected by the Veteran Athletes of Philadelphia).

In 2010 and 2011, Butler qualified for consecutive national championship games. The 2010 Butler team, led by star player Gordon Hayward, advanced to the national championship game at their hometown Lucas Oil Stadium, where they lost a close game to Duke, while creating an enduring reputation of its athletes prioritizing education by attending classes the day of the game. With a total enrollment of only 4,500 students, Butler is the smallest school to play for a national championship since the tournament expanded to 64 teams in 1985. In 2011, the Bulldogs advanced to the championship game but finished as runners-up again, this time losing to Connecticut.

=== Football ===
The Hoosier Helmet Trophy was established as the trophy helmet for the rivalry football game played between Butler and Valparaiso University. The Hoosier Helmet was created prior to the 2006 season to commemorate the football rivalry that has existed since 1921. The helmet trophy was created to further intensify the rivalry between these two teams. A group of Butler players, along with their head coach, Jeff Voris, came up with the idea. After Valparaiso head coach Stacey Adams agreed to play for the helmet, Butler equipment manager John Harding put the trophy together.

== Notable people ==
=== Faculty and staff ===
- Allen R. Benton, president and professor of philosophy and ancient languages
- Igor Buketoff, conductor and teacher
- Gordon Clark, theologian
- Michael J. Colburn, director of the United States Marine Band.
- Paul D. "Tony" Hinkle, developed the orange basketball
- Henry Leck, Associate Professor of Music
- Catharine Merrill, Professor English Literature
- Walter Myers Jr., Justice of the Indiana Supreme Court
- Susan Neville, creative writing professor
- Matt Pivec, saxophonist
- Samuel E. Perkins, Justice of the Indiana Supreme Court
- Michael Schelle, composer and teacher
- Marvin Scott, professor
- Brad Stevens, basketball coach
- Emma Lou Thornbrough, historian

== Presidents ==
The following persons has led the Butler University and its predecessor, North-Western Christian University, since 1858 as president:

No.	Image	President	Term start	Term end	Refs.
–		John Young (Note: never appointed president)	1856	1858	
1		Samuel K. Hoshour (Note: first officially appointed president)	1858	1861	
2		Allen R. Benton	1861	1868	
3		Otis A. Burgess	1868	1870	
4		William F. Black	1870	1873	
5		Otis A. Burgess	1873	1881	
6		Harvey W. Everest	1881	1886	
7		Allen R. Benton	1886	1891	
8		Scot Butler	1891	1904	
9		Winfred Garrison	1904	1906	
10		Scot Butler	1906	1907	
11		Thomas Carr Howe	1908	1920	
acting		James W. Putnam	1920	1921	
12		Robert J. Aley	September 1921	June 30, 1931	
acting		James W. Putnam	July 1, 1931	August 1931	
13		Walter S. Athearn	August 1931	October 30, 1933	
acting		James W. Putnam	October 30, 1933	January 12, 1935	
14		James W. Putnam	January 12, 1935	June 1939	
15		Daniel S. Robinson	June 1939	February 23, 1942	
acting		M. O. Ross	February 23, 1942	December 16, 1942	
16		M. O. Ross	December 16, 1942	August 31, 1962	
acting		Alexander E. Jones	September 1, 1962	January 25, 1963	
17		Alexander E. Jones	January 26, 1963	February 22, 1977	
acting		Paul R. Stewart	February 22, 1977	August 31, 1978	
18		John G. Johnson	September 1, 1978	December 31, 1988	
19		Geoffrey Bannister	January 1, 1989	May 31, 2000	
interim		Gwen Fountain	June 1, 2000	May 31, 2001	
20		Bobby Fong	June 1, 2001	May 31, 2011	
21		James Danko	July 1, 2011	present	

Table notes:
