= Indiana Magazine of History =

- Discipline: American History
- Language: English
- Edited by: David Nichols

Publication details
- Former name: Indiana Quarterly Magazine of History
- History: 1905–present
- Publisher: Indiana University Press for the Indiana University Department of History (United States)
- Frequency: Quarterly

Standard abbreviations
- ISO 4: Indiana Mag. Hist.

Indexing
- ISSN: 0019-6673
- LCCN: 06024674
- JSTOR: 00196673
- OCLC no.: 02371402

Links
- Journal homepage; Online access

The Indiana Magazine of History is a peer-reviewed academic journal published quarterly by the Indiana University Bloomington Department of History. Established primarily as a venue for historical documents of interest, particularly on Indiana's territorial period and early statehood, today it publishes a range of scholarly articles, reviews, roundtables and interviews on the history and changing cultures of Indiana and the Midwest, from the early encounters of Europeans and Native Americans to the present.

== History ==
The Indiana Magazine of History was founded in 1905 as the Indiana Quarterly Magazine of History by George S. Cottman as "a magazine devoted to the preservation and collating of matter that is of real value to the historical student." In 1913, when Logan Esarey succeeded Cottman as editor, the magazine began its affiliation with Indiana University and adopted its current name. Under Esarey the journal started to focus on historical interpretation and analysis in addition to reproduction of printed sources. The transition was completed under the editorships of John Barnhart (1941–1955), who long-time associate editor Lorna Lutes Sylvester said brought an "aura…of sophisticated scholarship" to the journal, and Donald F. Carmony (1955–1975), whose service to Indiana University was recognized in 2002 by the creation of a chaired professorship in the IU history department. The duties of the position include editing responsibilities for the Indiana Magazine of History.

Aside from its longevity, the journal is notable for its efforts in bringing together professional and amateur historians as both contributors and readers, while still remaining a decidedly academic endeavor. Its wide lay readership (the journal was for many years offered as a benefit of membership in the Indianapolis-based Indiana Historical Society and its members continue to comprise the bulk of its subscribers), along with the support of Indiana University's professional scholars, have helped to account for the Indiana Magazine of History's continued publication. In 1955, former editor William O. Lynch (1928–1941) reflected on this point in an article chronicling the first fifty years of the journal's existence: "The two editors of the early period from 1905 to 1913 – the largely self-educated man and the university-trained college teacher – supplemented each other to a noticeable degree and cooperated in a fine spirit." The magazine continues to serve as the journal of scholarly record for Indiana history, while expanding its services to include lesson plans for teachers, collaboration on the scripts of Indiana Public Radio's "Moment of Indiana History" program, and free online access to its back issues through Indiana University Digital Library Program's Indiana Magazine of History Online website.

== List of editors ==
- George S. Cottman (March 1905 – December 1907, December 1911 – March 1913)
- Christopher B. Coleman (March 1908 – September 1911, March 1926 – June 1926, March 1928 – June 1928)
- Logan Esarey (June 1913 – December 1925, September 1926 – December 1926)
- William O. Lynch (September 1928 – June 1941)
- John D. Barnhart (September 1941 – March 1955)
- Donald F. Carmony (June 1955 – December 1975)
- Lorna Sylvester (September 1969, September 1970, September 1971, September 1972, December 1973, March 1976 – September 1976, September 1982 – September 1983)
- James H. Madison (December 1976 – December 1993)
- Richard Blackett (March 1994 – September 1996)
- Bernard W. Sheehan (December 1996 – September 2002)
- Eric Sandweiss (December 2002 – June 2020)
- David Nichols (June 2020 – present)
